= 2015 European Athletics U23 Championships – Women's 100 metres hurdles =

The women's 100 metres hurdles event at the 2015 European Athletics U23 Championships was held in Tallinn, Estonia, at Kadriorg Stadium on 10 and 11 July.

== Medalists ==
Gold	Noemi Zbären; Switzerland
Silver	Karolina Kołeczek; Poland
Bronze	Nadine Visser; Netherlands

== Results ==
=== Final ===
11 July
Wind: -0.2 m/s

Rank	Name	Nationality	Reaction Time	Time	Notes
1st place, gold medalist(s)	Noemi Zbären	Switzerland	0.156	12.71	PB
2nd place, silver medalist(s)	Karolina Kołeczek	Poland	0.173	12.92	
3rd place, bronze medalist(s)	Nadine Visser	Netherlands	0.157	13.01	
4	Franziska Hofmann	Germany	0.150	13.17	SB
5	Anastasiya Nikolayeva	Russia	0.130	13.33	
6	Eefje Boons	Netherlands	0.182	13.35	
7	Ricarda Lobe	Germany	0.148	13.52	
8	Lilla Juhász	Hungary	0.175	13.56	

=== Semifinals ===
10 July

==== Semifinal 1 ====
Wind: 0.1 m/s

Rank	Name	Nationality	Reaction Time	Time	Notes
1	Noemi Zbären	Switzerland	0.161	12.88	Q
2	Eefje Boons	Netherlands	0.160	13.09	PB Q
3	Lilla Juhász	Hungary	0.135	13.20	NUR PB Q
4	Franziska Hofmann	Germany	0.169	13.24	Q
5	Lucie Koudelová	Czech Republic	0.142	13.26	SB
6	Yuliya Dolzhkova	Ukraine	0.189	13.55	SB
7	Joni Tomičić Prezelj	Slovenia	0.159	13.66	
8	Reetta Hurske	Finland	0.127	13.66	

==== Semifinal 2 ====
Wind: -0.8 m/s

Rank	Name	Nationality	Reaction Time	Time	Notes
1	Nadine Visser	Netherlands	0.161	13.09	Q
2	Karolina Kołeczek	Poland	0.156	13.12	Q
3	Ricarda Lobe	Germany	0.155	13.36	Q
4	Anastasiya Nikolayeva	Russia	0.127	13.36	Q
5	Monika Zapalska	Germany	0.133	13.71	
6	Eva Wimberger	Austria	0.184	13.78	
7	Giada Carmassi	Italy	0.156	13.78	
8	Awa Sene	France	0.223	13.82	

=== Heats ===
10 July

==== Heat 1 ====
Wind: -1.4 m/s

Rank	Name	Nationality	Reaction Time	Time	Notes
1	Nadine Visser	Netherlands	0.179	13.39	Q
2	Anastasiya Nikolayeva	Russia	0.161	13.56	Q
3	Reetta Hurske	Finland	0.140	13.64	Q
4	Ida Bakke Hansen	Norway	0.164	13.87	
5	Yasmin Miller	United Kingdom	0.153	13.93	
6	Tina Slejko	Slovenia	0.147	14.13	
7	Karolína Hlavatá	Czech Republic	0.183	14.25	
8	Majella Hauri	Switzerland	0.148	14.32	SB

==== Heat 2 ====
Wind: -1.1 m/s

Rank	Name	Nationality	Reaction Time	Time	Notes
1	Noemi Zbären	Switzerland	0.159	13.00	Q
2	Lilla Juhász	Hungary	0.172	13.72	Q
3	Eva Wimberger	Austria	0.171	13.75	Q
4	Giada Carmassi	Italy	0.162	13.82	q
5	Anamaria Nesteriuc	Romania	0.152	13.89	
6	Laura Strajnar	Slovenia	0.165	14.29	
7	Özge Soylu	Turkey	0.185	14.45	

==== Heat 3 ====
Wind: -1.9 m/s

Rank	Name	Nationality	Reaction Time	Time	Notes
1	Karolina Kołeczek	Poland	0.126	13.18	Q
2	Lucie Koudelová	Czech Republic	0.158	13.52	Q
3	Yuliya Dolzhkova	Ukraine	0.180	13.82	Q
4	Monika Zapalska	Germany	0.143	13.86	q
5	Sarah Lavin	Ireland	0.147	13.87	
6	Olimpia Barbosa	Portugal	0.176	14.24	
7	Eveline Rebsamen	Switzerland	0.143	14.28	

==== Heat 4 ====
Wind: -0.8 m/s

Rank	Name	Nationality	Reaction Time	Time	Notes
1	Franziska Hofmann	Germany	0.160	13.48	Q
2	Awa Sene	France	0.192	13.61	Q
3	Ricarda Lobe	Germany	0.159	13.64	Q
4	Joni Tomičić Prezelj	Slovenia	0.166	13.65	PB q
5	Eefje Boons	Netherlands	0.153	13.66	q
6	Vera Fernandes	Portugal	0.178	13.91	
7	Agathe Holtan Wathne	Norway	0.144	14.15	
8	Laura-Maria Oja	Estonia	0.167	14.83	

== Participation ==
According to an unofficial count, 30 athletes from 20 countries participated in the event.

- Austria (1)
- Czech Republic (2)
- Estonia (1)
- Finland (1)
- France (1)
- Germany (3)
- Hungary (1)
- Ireland (1)
- Italy (1)
- Netherlands (2)
- Norway (2)
- Poland (1)
- Portugal (2)
- Romania (1)
- Russia (1)
- Slovenia (3)
- Switzerland (3)
- Turkey (1)
- Ukraine (1)
- United Kingdom (1)
