= 2019 European Athletics Indoor Championships – Women's 60 metres hurdles =

The women's 60 metres hurdles event at the 2019 European Athletics Indoor Championships was held on 2 March 2019 at 12:35 (heats), and on 3 March 2019 at 11:25 (semifinals) and 18:25 (final) local time.

== Medalists ==
Gold	Silver	Bronze
Nadine Visser; Netherlands	Cindy Roleder; Germany	Elvira Herman; Belarus

== Records ==
Standing records prior to the 2019 European Athletics Indoor Championships
World record	Susanna Kallur (SWE)	7.68	Karlsruhe, Germany	10 February 2008
European record	Susanna Kallur (SWE)	7.68	Karlsruhe, Germany	10 February 2008
Championship record	Lyudmila Narozhilenko (URS)	7.74	Glasgow, United Kingdom	4 March 1990
World Leading	Sharika Nelvis (USA)	7.85	New York City, United States	24 February 2019
European Leading	Pamela Dutkiewicz (GER)	7.89	Berlin, Germany	1 February 2019

== Results ==
=== Heats ===
Qualification: First 3 in each heat (Q) and the next 4 fastest (q) advance to the Semi-Finals.

Rank	Heat	Athlete	Nationality	Time	Note
1	4	Nadine Visser	Netherlands	7.99	Q
2	3	Solene Ndama	France	8.04	Q
3	2	Cindy Roleder	Germany	8.06	Q
4	4	Reetta Hurske	Finland	8.06	Q
5	3	Nooralotta Neziri	Finland	8.07	Q
5	3	Luca Kozák	Hungary	8.08	Q
7	2	Gréta Kerekes	Hungary	8.09	Q
8	2	Andrea Ivančević	Croatia	8.10	Q
9	4	Mariya Aglitskaya	Authorised Neutral Athletes	8.11	Q
10	1	Elvira Herman	Belarus	8.11	Q
11	3	Alina Talay	Belarus	8.12	q
12	1	Klaudia Siciarz	Poland	8.13	Q
13	2	Hanna Plotitsyna	Ukraine	8.15	q
14	1	Luminosa Bogliolo	Italy	8.15	Q
15	1	Matilda Bogdanoff	Finland	8.20	q
16	3	Ivana Lončarek	Croatia	8.21	q
17	4	Hanna Chubkovtsova	Ukraine	8.22	
18	3	Stanislava Lajčáková	Slovakia	8.28	
19	1	Sacha Alessandrini	France	8.28	
20	2	Awa Sene	France	8.30	
21	3	Tilde Johansson	Sweden	8.31	
22	4	Ruslana Rashkovan	Belarus	8.35	
23	4	Karolina Kołeczek	Poland	8.37	
24	1	Nataliya Ruchkivska	Ukraine	8.38	
25	4	Caridad Jerez	Spain	8.38	
26	1	Olimpia Barbosa	Portugal	8.40	
27	2	Stephanie Bendrat	Austria	8.42	
28	2	Sevval Ayaz	Turkey	8.46	

=== Semifinals ===
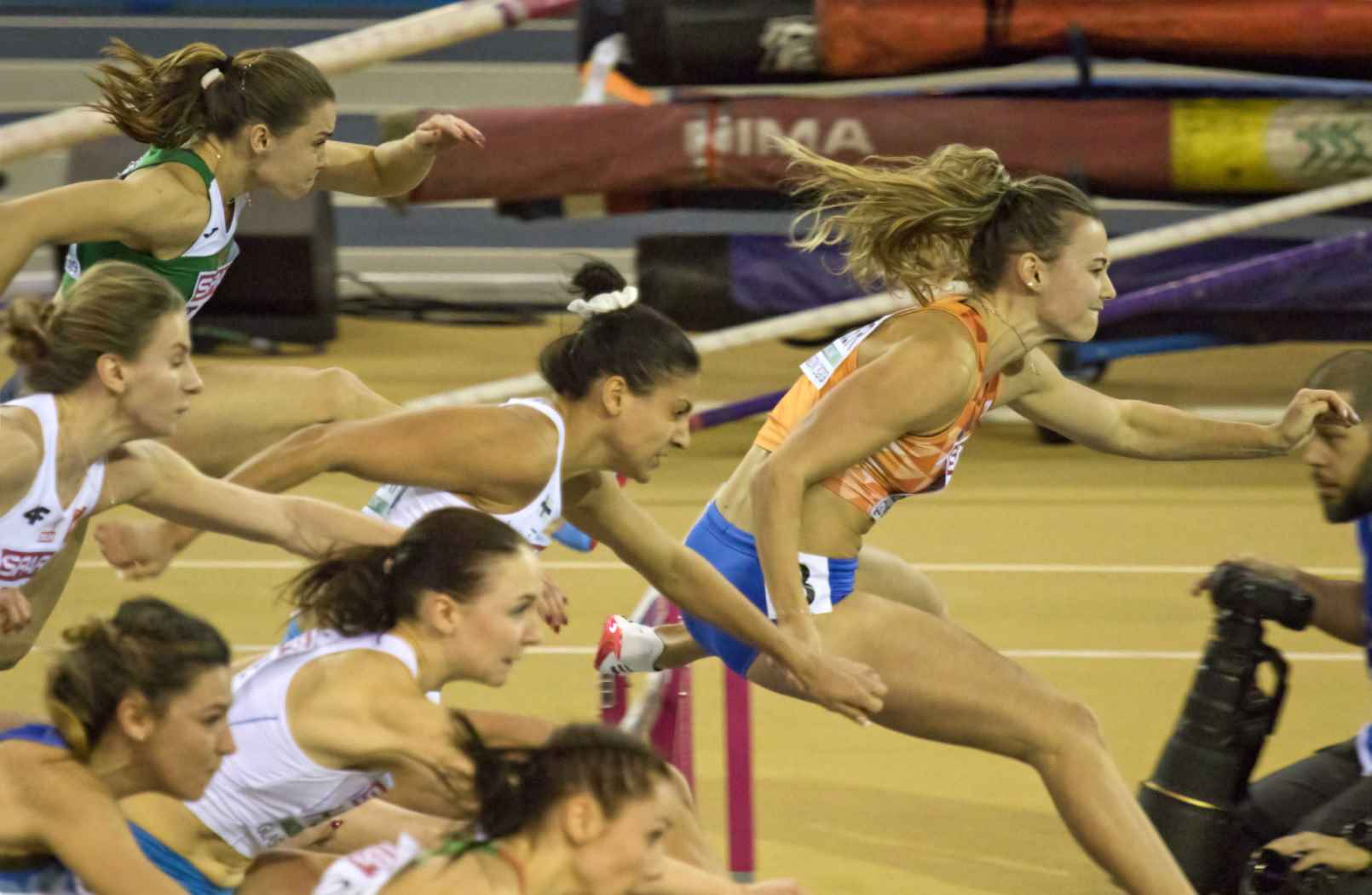
Semifinal 1

Qualification: First 3 in each heat (Q) and the next 2 fastest (q) advance to the Final.

Rank	Heat	Athlete	Nationality	Time	Note
1	1	Luca Kozák	Hungary	7.97	Q, NR
2	1	Nadine Visser	Netherlands	7.99	Q
3	2	Cindy Roleder	Germany	8.02	Q
4	2	Elvira Herman	Belarus	8.03	Q
5	1	Nooralotta Neziri	Finland	8.04	Q
6	2	Gréta Kerekes	Hungary	8.05	Q
7	1	Reetta Hurske	Finland	8.07	q
8	2	Andrea Ivančević	Croatia	8.07	q
9	2	Solene Ndama	France	8.09	
10	1	Luminosa Bogliolo	Italy	8.11	
11	2	Hanna Plotitsyna	Ukraine	8.11	
12	2	Matilda Bogdanoff	Finland	8.12	
13	1	Klaudia Siciarz	Poland	8.14	
14	2	Mariya Aglitskaya	Authorised Neutral Athletes	8.14	
15	1	Alina Talay	Belarus	8.15	
16	1	Ivana Lončarek	Croatia	8.27	

=== Final ===
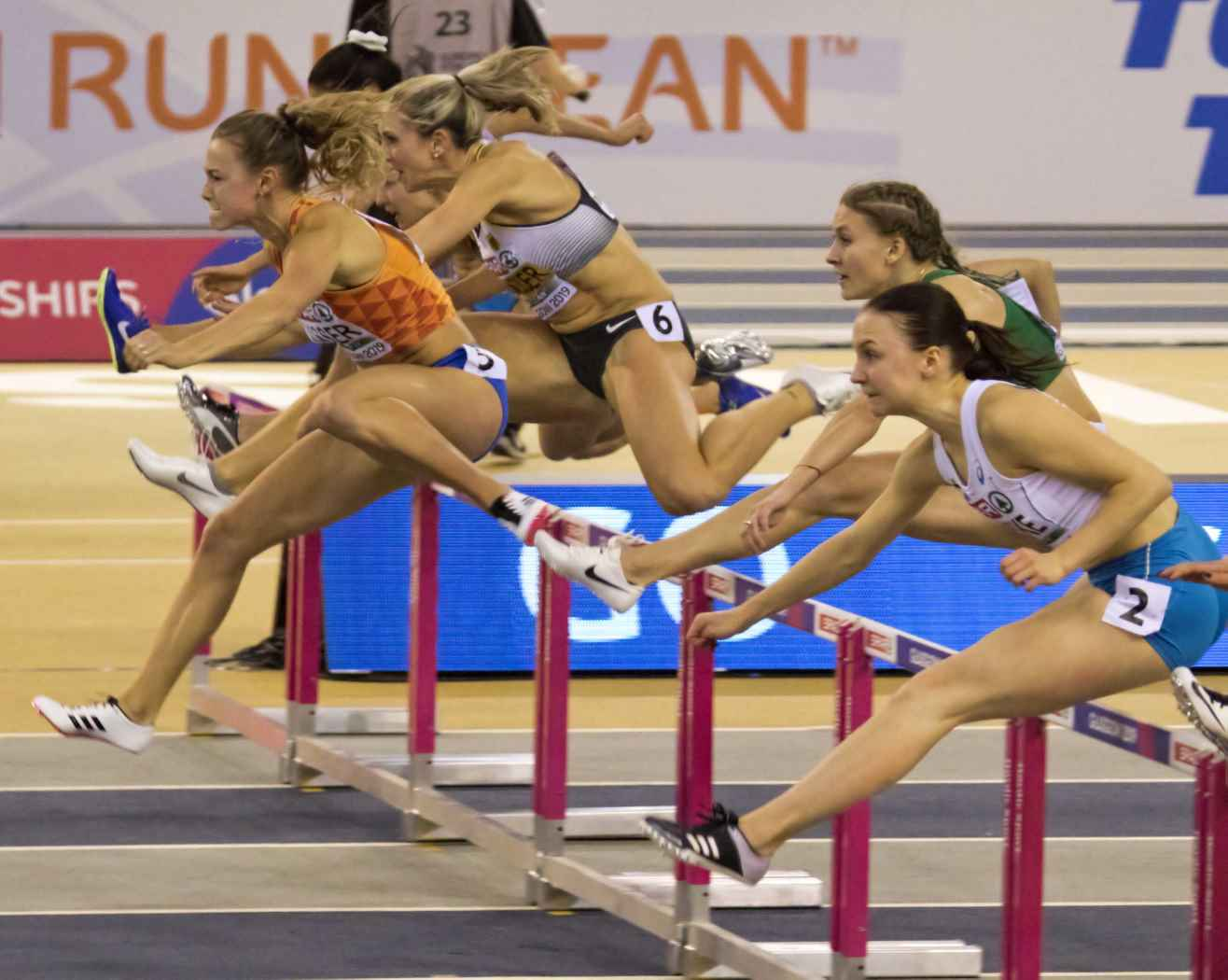
The final

Rank	Lane	Athlete	Nationality	Time	Note
1st place, gold medalist(s)	5	Nadine Visser	Netherlands	7.87	EL
2nd place, silver medalist(s)	6	Cindy Roleder	Germany	7.97	
3rd place, bronze medalist(s)	4	Elvira Herman	Belarus	8.00	
4	2	Reetta Hurske	Finland	8.02	
5	7	Gréta Kerekes	Hungary	8.03	
6	8	Nooralotta Neziri	Finland	8.09	
7	1	Andrea Ivančević	Croatia	8.14	
	3	Luca Kozák	Hungary	DNS	
