= 2016 Austrian Athletics Championships =

- Dates: 30–31 July 2016
- Host city: Hallein, Austria
- Venue: Universitäts- und Landessportzentrum Salzburg Rif

The 2016 Austrian Athletics Championships (German: Österreichische Staatsmeisterschaften in der Leichtathletik 2016) was the year's national championship in outdoor track and field for Austria. It was held on 30 and 31 July at the Universitäts- und Landessportzentrum Salzburg Rif in Rif, Hallein. It served as the selection meeting for Austria at the 2016 Summer Olympics.

== Results ==
=== Men ===
Event	Gold		Silver		Bronze	
100 metres	Markus Fuchs	10.47	Maximilian Münzker	10.70	Christoph Haslauer	10.86
200 metres	Markus Fuchs	22.17	Maximilian Drössler	22.31	Nico Garea	22.31
400 metres	Mario Gebhardt	47.47	Dominik Hufnagl	48.01	Günther Matzinger	48.28
800 metres	Günther Matzinger	1:55.00	Maximilian Fridrich	1:55.30	Maximilian Trummer	1:55.96
1500 metres	Andreas Vojta	3:48.46	Brenton Rowe	3:48.52	Maximilian Fridrich	3:56.86
5000 metres	Brenton Rowe	14:50.34	Manuel Innerhofer	15:06.51	Hans Peter Innerhofer	15:19.05
110 m hurdles	Florian Domenig	14.85	Martin Kainrath	14.98	Julian Bergmüller	15.59
400 m hurdles	Dominik Hufnagl	51.38	Thomas Kain	51.71	Mario Gebhardt	52.12
4 × 100 m relay	ULC - Riverside Mödling; Chukwuma Nnamdi; Markus Fuchs; Andreas Meyer; Levin Gottl	41.78	SVS-Leichtathletik; Andreas Steinmetz; Michael Szalay; Dominik Hufnagl; Felix Einramhof	42.23	ATSV Linz LA; Christoph Rosenthaler; Thomas Rosenthaler; Gregor Erler; Simon Riegler	42.30
High jump	Josip Kopic	2.06	Andreas Steinmetz	2.00	Alexander Dengg	1.97
Pole vault	Dominik Distelberger	4.95	Sebastian Ender	4.85	Florian Matzi	4.75
Long jump	Dominik Distelberger	7.61	Maximilian Drössler	7.24	Roman Schmied	7.15
Triple jump	Philipp Kronsteiner	15.93	Roman Schmied	15.58	Felix Schultschik	14.19
Shot put	Georg Stamminger	15.60	Gerhard Zillner	15.08	Heimo Kaspar	14.04
Discus throw	Lukas Weißhaidinger	64.42	Lukas Jost	51.36	Gerhard Zillner	44.00
Hammer throw	Matthias Hayek	57.20	Marco Cozzoli	56.48	Michael Hofer	52.13
Javelin throw	Matthias Kaserer	67.35	Gregor Högler	67.19	Martin Strasser	65.45
3 × 1000 m relay	KSV alutechnik Christoph Teubl; Daniel Karner; Patrick-Tim Mund	8:08.93	ULC Linz Oberbank; Hannes Hinterreiter; Paul Steinbrecher; Thomas Schnallinger	8:28.15	LAC Klagenfurt; Nicolas Wohlfahrt; Morgan Schusser; Janik Schusser	8:43.46

=== Women ===
Event	Gold		Silver		Bronze	
100 metres	Alexandra Toth	11.73	Stephanie Bendrat	11.75	Carina Pölzl	11.77
200 metres	Carina Pölzl	24.79	Savannah Mapalagama	25.30	Alexandra Toth	25.35
400 metres	Carina Schrempf	55.86	Julia Schwarzinger	56.00	Sigrid Portenschlager	57.89
800 metres	Cornelia Wohlfahrt	2:12.83	Carina Schrempf	2:13.46	Julia Millonig	2:14.36
1500 metres	Cornelia Wohlfahrt	4:35.66	Sandrina Illes	4:35.96	Laura Ripfel	4:58.30
5000 metres	Jennifer Wenth	16:39.38	Sandrina Illes	16:47.79	Cornelia Moser	16:51.86
100 m hurdles	Stephanie Bendrat	13.65	Eva Wimberger	13.85	Beate Schrott	13.87
400 m hurdles	Verena Preiner	60.31	Katharina Taitl	63.29	Christine Weber	63.78
4 × 100 m relay	UNION St. Pölten; Michaela Burda; Viola Kleiser; Eva Wimberger; Valerie Kleiser	46.68	DSG Volksbank Wien; Hanna Gschlenk; Savannah Mapalagama; Sigrid Portenschlager; Katharina Mahlfleisch	47.39	Union Salzburg Leichtathletik; Ingeborg Grünwald; Carolina Petran; Anna Möstl; Stephanie Bendrat	47.65
High jump	Ekaterina Krasovskiy	1.77	Sarah Lagger	1.77	Idia Ohenhen	1.74
Pole vault	Brigitta Hesch	4.00	Agnes Hodi	3.90	Sarah Zimmer	3.90
Long jump	Michaela Egger	5.89	Verena Preiner	5.88	Ingeborg Grünwald	5.75
Triple jump	Michaela Egger	12.96	Magdalena Macht	12.61	Patricia Daxbacher	11.96
Shot put	Christina Scheffauer	13.88	Stefanie Waldkircher	13.39	Verena Preiner	13.07
Discus throw	Veronika Watzek	56.18	Djeneba Touré	50.85	Stefanie Waldkircher	44.31
Hammer throw	Tatjana Meklau	54.42	Jacqueline Röbl	52.45	Julia Siart	52.01
Javelin throw	Victoria Hudson	51.49	Andrea Lindenthaler	50.76	Magdalena Dielacher	48.24
3 × 800 m relay	SU IGLA long life Sarah Winkler; Petra Gumpinger; Anna Baumgaitner	7:15.76	LT Bgld Eisenstadt; Julia Edler; Anna Leser; Caroline Bredlinger	7:32.46	ULC Weinland; Anika Gindl; Lena Spazirer; Laura Ripfel	7:45.78
