= 2017 European Athletics U23 Championships – Women's 100 metres hurdles =

The women's 100 metres hurdles event at the 2017 European Athletics U23 Championships was held in Bydgoszcz, Poland, at Zdzisław Krzyszkowiak Stadium on 14 and 15 July.

== Medalists ==
Gold	Nadine Visser; Netherlands
Silver	Elvira Herman; Belarus
Bronze	Luca Kozák; Hungary

== Results ==
=== Heats ===
14 July

Qualification rule: First 3 (Q) and the next 4 fastest (q) qualified for the semifinals.

Wind:
Heat 1: +0.2 m/s, Heat 2: +0.7 m/s, Heat 3: +1.1 m/s, Heat 4: +0.5 m/s

Rank	Heat	Name	Nationality	Time	Notes
1	3	Laura Valette	France	13.26	Q
2	1	Nadine Visser	Netherlands	13.26	Q
3	2	Elvira Herman	Belarus	13.28	Q
4	4	Luca Kozák	Hungary	13.39	Q
5	2	Helena Jiranová	Czech Republic	13.47	Q, PB
5	3	Reetta Hurske	Finland	13.47	Q, =SB
7	4	Yasmin Miller	Great Britain	13.48	Q
8	1	Olimpia Barbosa	Portugal	13.52	Q, PB
9	4	Luminosa Bogliolo	Italy	13.52	Q
10	3	Petra Répási	Hungary	13.53	Q
11	4	Ruslana Rashkovan	Belarus	13.56	q, SB
12	2	María Mújika	Spain	13.56	Q, PB
13	1	Natalia Christofi	Cyprus	13.56	Q
14	1	Marlena Morton	Poland	13.61	q
14	2	Mette Graversgaard	Denmark	13.61	q, SB
16	3	Ewa Ochocka	Poland	13.64	q
17	2	Stanislava Lajčáková	Slovakia	13.66	
18	1	Kreete Verlin	Estonia	13.73	PB
19	2	Nicla Mosetti	Italy	13.73	
20	3	Viktoria Ihnatsiuk	Belarus	13.85	
21	1	Paulina Huber	Germany	13.86	
22	3	Abigail Gyedu	Italy	13.91	
23	4	Cecilia Sandell	Finland	13.96	
24	2	Victoria Rausch	Luxembourg	14.06	
25	3	Elena Stefania Viscun	Romania	14.11	
26	4	Selina von Jackowski	Switzerland	14.12	
27	1	Özge Soylu	Turkey	14.41	

=== Semifinals ===
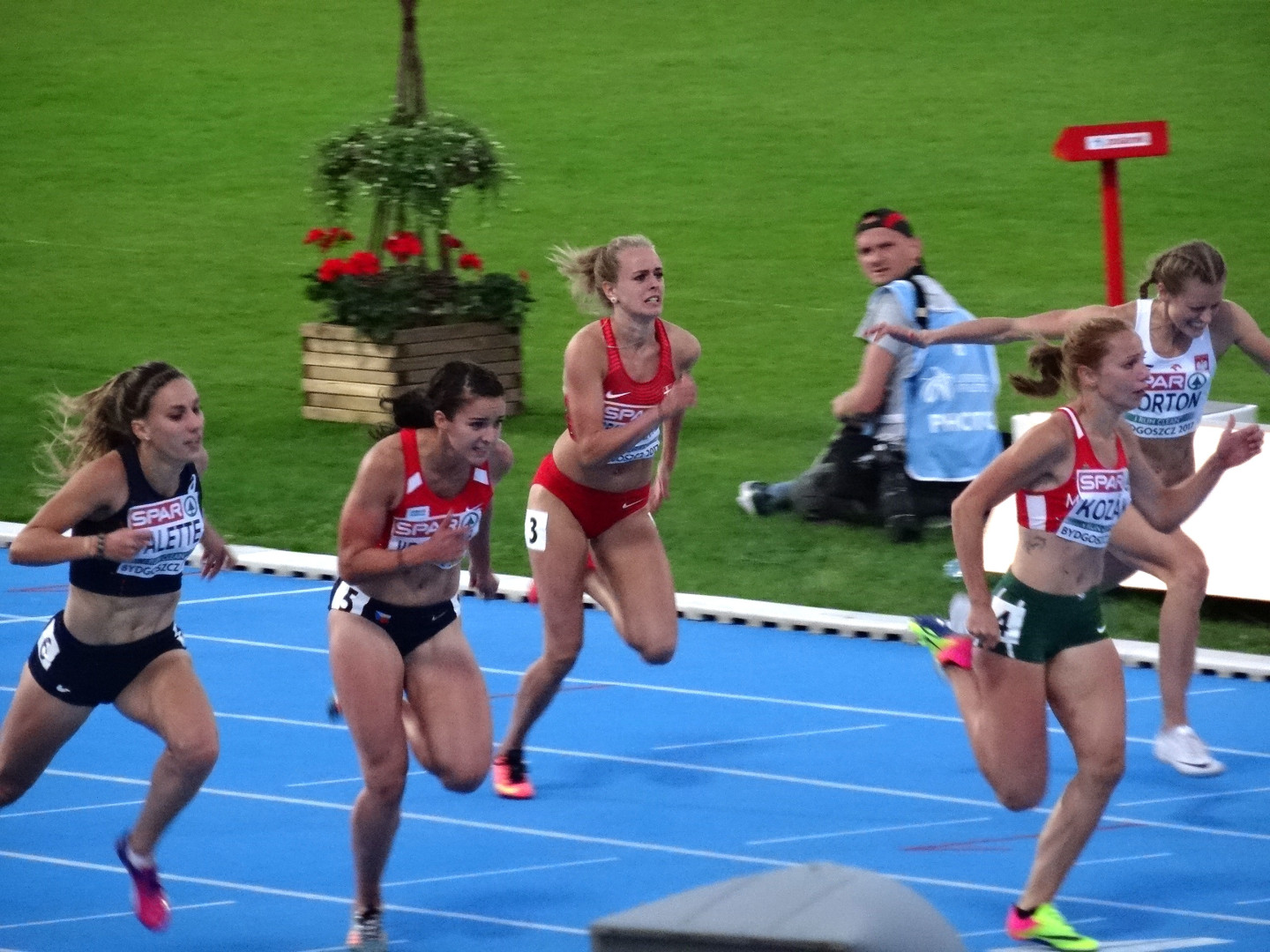
Semifinal 1

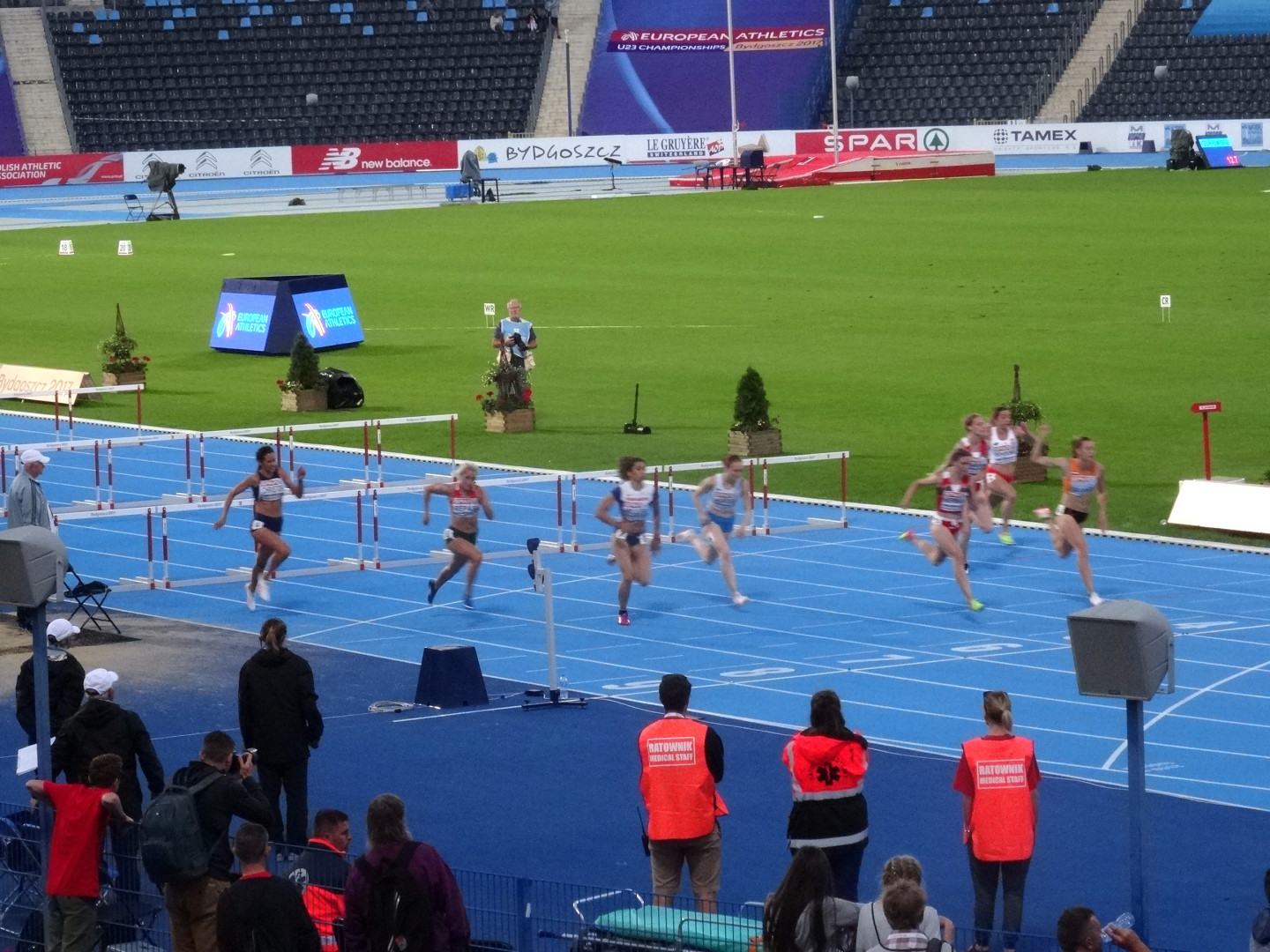
Semifinal 2

15 July

Qualification rule: First 3 (Q) and the next 2 fastest (q) qualified for the final.

Wind:
Heat 1: +0.8 m/s, Heat 2: +0.3 m/s

Rank	Heat	Name	Nationality	Time	Notes
1	2	Nadine Visser	Netherlands	13.15	Q
2	2	Elvira Herman	Belarus	13.17	Q
3	1	Luca Kozák	Hungary	13.31	Q
4	1	Laura Valette	France	13.38	Q
5	2	Yasmin Miller	Great Britain	13.40	Q
6	1	Helena Jiranová	Czech Republic	13.44	Q, PB
7	2	Reetta Hurske	Finland	13.44	q, SB
8	1	Olimpia Barbosa	Portugal	13.46	q, PB
9	1	Luminosa Bogliolo	Italy	13.50	
10	2	Petra Répási	Hungary	13.53	
11	2	Ruslana Rashkovan	Belarus	13.54	SB
12	1	María Mújika	Spain	13.55	PB
13	1	Marlena Morton	Poland	13.58	PB
14	2	Ewa Ochocka	Poland	13.73	
15	1	Mette Graversgaard	Denmark	13.76	
16	2	Natalia Christofi	Cyprus	13.81	

=== Final ===
15 July

Wind: +2.3 m/s

Rank	Lane	Name	Nationality	Time	Notes
1st place, gold medalist(s)	7	Nadine Visser	Netherlands	12.92	
2nd place, silver medalist(s)	5	Elvira Herman	Belarus	12.95	
3rd place, bronze medalist(s)	54	Luca Kozák	Hungary	13.06	
4	9	Yasmin Miller	Great Britain	13.32	
5	2	Reetta Hurske	Finland	13.32	
6	3	Olimpia Barbosa	Portugal	13.45	
7	8	Helena Jiranová	Czech Republic	13.47	
8	6	Laura Valette	France	13.85	
