= 2013 European Athletics U23 Championships – Women's 100 metres hurdles =

The Women's 100 metres hurdles event at the 2013 European Athletics U23 Championships was held in Tampere, Finland, at Ratina Stadium on 13 July.

== Medalists ==
Gold	Isabelle Pedersen; Norway
Silver	Karolina Kołeczek; Poland
Bronze	Nooralotta Neziri; Finland

== Results ==
=== Final ===
13 July 2013 / 20:50
Wind: -0.1 m/s

Rank	Name	Nationality	Lane	Reaction Time	Time	Notes
1st place, gold medalist(s)	Isabelle Pedersen	Norway	5	0.184	13.12	
2nd place, silver medalist(s)	Karolina Kołeczek	Poland	4	0.140	13.30	
3rd place, bronze medalist(s)	Nooralotta Neziri	Finland	3	0.117	13.39	
4	Urszula Bhebhe	Poland	6	0.139	13.42	
5	Jenna Pletsch	Germany	7	0.138	13.44	SB
6	Ekaterina Bleskina	Russia	1	0.153	13.48	SB
7	Ivana Lončarek	Croatia	8	0.154	13.66	
8	Lotta Harala	Finland	2	0.153	13.76	

=== Heats ===
Qualified: First 3 in each heat (Q) and 2 best performers (q) advance to the Final

==== Summary ====
Rank	Name	Nationality	Time	Notes
1	Isabelle Pedersen	Norway	13.08	Q
2	Nooralotta Neziri	Finland	13.27	Q
3	Urszula Bhebhe	Poland	13.31	Q PB
4	Karolina Kołeczek	Poland	13.43	Q
5	Jenna Pletsch	Germany	13.46	Q SB
6	Ivana Lončarek	Croatia	13.50	Q
7	Lotta Harala	Finland	13.52	q PB
8	Ekaterina Bleskina	Russia	13.52	q
9	Suzanne Williams	Netherlands	13.54	PB
10	Eva Vital	Portugal	13.55	
11	Elisávet Pesirídou	Greece	13.59	PB
12	Anamaria Nesteriuc	Romania	13.61	PB
13	Jana Sotáková	Czech Republic	13.66	
14	Kine Aaltvedt	Norway	13.72	
15	Elodie Jakob	Switzerland	13.79	
16	Silvia Zuin	Italy	13.98	

==== Details ====
===== Heat 1 =====
13 July 2013 / 19:10 Wind: +0.3 m/s

Rank	Name	Nationality	Lane	Reaction Time	Time	Notes
1	Nooralotta Neziri	Finland	3	0.150	13.27	Q
2	Karolina Kołeczek	Poland	5	0.165	13.43	Q
3	Jenna Pletsch	Germany	7	0.161	13.46	Q SB
4	Suzanne Williams	Netherlands	1	0.171	13.54	PB
5	Elisávet Pesirídou	Greece	6	0.122	13.59	PB
6	Jana Sotáková	Czech Republic	2	0.165	13.66	
7	Kine Aaltvedt	Norway	8	0.166	13.72	
8	Silvia Zuin	Italy	4	0.138	13.98	

===== Heat 2 =====
13 July 2013 / 19:18 Wind: +0.1 m/s

Rank	Name	Nationality	Lane	Reaction Time	Time	Notes
1	Isabelle Pedersen	Norway	4	0.164	13.08	Q
2	Urszula Bhebhe	Poland	5	0.137	13.31	Q PB
3	Ivana Lončarek	Croatia	6	0.159	13.50	Q
4	Lotta Harala	Finland	8	0.184	13.52	q PB
5	Ekaterina Bleskina	Russia	3	0.168	13.52	q
6	Eva Vital	Portugal	7	0.167	13.55	
7	Anamaria Nesteriuc	Romania	2	0.155	13.61	PB
8	Elodie Jakob	Switzerland	1	0.179	13.79	

== Participation ==
According to an unofficial count, 16 athletes from 13 countries participated in the event.

- Croatia (1)
- Czech Republic (1)
- Finland (2)
- Germany (1)
- Greece (1)
- Italy (1)
- Netherlands (1)
- Norway (2)
- Poland (2)
- Portugal (1)
- Romania (1)
- Russia (1)
- Switzerland (1)
