= 2018 IAAF World Indoor Championships – Women's 60 metres hurdles =

Women's 60 metres hurdles at the 2018 IAAF World Indoor Championships
- Venue: Arena Birmingham
- Dates: 2–3 March
- Competitors: 37 from 24 nations
- Winning time: 7.70 CR

Medalists
gold medal	Kendra Harrison	United States
silver medal	Christina Manning	United States
bronze medal	Nadine Visser	Netherlands

Video on YouTube Official Video

The women's 60 metres hurdles at the 2018 IAAF World Indoor Championships took place on 2 and 3 March 2018.

== Summary ==
Kendra Harrison came into these championships as the favorite based on her outdoor world record, but so far world championship medals have evaded her. She dominated her way through the rounds.

In the final, Christina Manning got the best start along with Devynne Charlton, but Harrison quickly made up ground. By the second hurdle, she had a foot (30 cm) lead, over the two, with Charlton fading from contention after that, while Sharika Nelvis and Isabelle Pedersen were the next back by the third hurdle. Nadine Visser pulled even with Pedersen still 2 feet behind Nelvis. Out front, Harrison had a metre lead over Manning. On the run in, Harrison and Manning retained their positions, while Visser closed quickly to take bronze from Nelvis. Seventh over the last barrier, Cindy Roleder also closed quickly to almost catch Nelvis for fourth. Harrison's winning time of 7.70 was a new Championship record.

== Results ==
=== Heats ===
The heats were started on 2 March at 18:05.

Rank	Heat	Lane	Name	Nationality	Time	Notes
1	4	4	Kendra Harrison	United States	7.77	Q
2	2	8	Isabelle Pedersen	Norway	7.93	Q, PB
3	3	8	Devynne Charlton	Bahamas	7.95	Q, SB
4	5	6	Oluwatobiloba Amusan	Nigeria	7.95	Q
5	5	5	Sally Pearson	Australia	7.96	Q, SB
6	2	4	Christina Manning	United States	7.96	Q
7	1	8	Sharika Nelvis	United States	7.97	Q
8	3	3	Cindy Roleder	Germany	7.97	Q
9	3	5	Nadine Visser	Netherlands	8.01	Q
10	1	5	Stephanie Bendrat	Austria	8.06	Q
11	3	7	Elvira Herman	Belarus	8.07	Q
12	5	4	Alina Talay	Belarus	8.11	Q
13	4	6	Hanna Plotitsyna	Ukraine	8.11	Q
14	1	7	Nooralotta Neziri	Finland	8.13	Q
15	2	7	Andrea Ivančević	Croatia	8.15	Q
16	4	3	Luca Kozák	Hungary	8.16	Q
17	5	3	Karolina Kołeczek	Poland	8.16	Q, SB
18	1	2	Eefje Boons	Netherlands	8.16	Q
19	5	8	Ivana Lončarek	Croatia	8.16	q
20	4	7	Lindsay Lindley	Nigeria	8.17	Q
21	3	4	Michelle Jenneke	Australia	8.20	q, SB
22	4	2	Reetta Hurske	Finland	8.20	q
23	2	2	Eline Berings	Belgium	8.20	Q
24	5	7	Gréta Kerekes	Hungary	8.20	q
25	4	8	Angela Whyte	Canada	8.21	SB
26	3	1	Marilyn Nwawulor	Great Britain	8.22	
27	2	5	Beate Schrott	Austria	8.27	
28	1	6	Veronica Borsi	Italy	8.27	
29	2	6	Megan Marrs	Great Britain	8.28	
30	3	2	Anamaria Nesteriuc	Romania	8.32	
31	5	2	Ricarda Lobe	Germany	8.33	
32	1	3	Andrea Vargas	Costa Rica	8.34	
33	2	3	Elisa Di Lazzaro	Italy	8.35	
34	3	6	Elin Westerlund	Sweden	8.36	
35	4	5	Karel Elodie Ziketh	Ivory Coast	8.43	
36	5	1	Mulern Jean	Haiti	8.51	SB
	1	4	Elisavet Pesiridou	Greece	DNF	

=== Semifinals ===
The semifinals started on 3 March at 18:05.

Rank	Heat	Lane	Name	Nationality	Time	Notes
1	2	4	Kendra Harrison	United States	7.79	Q
2	1	6	Christina Manning	United States	7.83	Q
3	3	6	Nadine Visser	Netherlands	7.83	Q, NR
4	2	6	Cindy Roleder	Germany	7.86	Q
5	3	3	Sharika Nelvis	United States	7.86	Q
6	3	4	Isabelle Pedersen	Norway	7.86	q, PB
7	1	4	Devynne Charlton	Bahamas	7.89	Q, NR
8	1	5	Oluwatobiloba Amusan	Nigeria	7.91	q
9	2	5	Sally Pearson	Australia	7.92	SB
10	1	7	Elvira Herman	Belarus	8.06	
11	2	3	Alina Talay	Belarus	8.07	
12	3	8	Andrea Ivančević	Croatia	8.07	SB
13	2	1	Lindsay Lindley	Nigeria	8.08	
14	1	3	Hanna Plotitsyna	Ukraine	8.09	
15	3	5	Stephanie Bendrat	Austria	8.10	
16	3	1	Eline Berings	Belgium	8.14	
17	2	2	Gréta Kerekes	Hungary	8.17	
18	2	8	Nooralotta Neziri	Finland	8.20	
19	3	2	Reetta Hurske	Finland	8.20	
20	1	1	Ivana Lončarek	Croatia	8.21	
21	3	7	Karolina Kołeczek	Poland	8.21	
22	1	2	Michelle Jenneke	Australia	8.22	
23	1	8	Luca Kozák	Hungary	8.24	
24	2	7	Eefje Boons	Netherlands	8.24	

=== Final ===
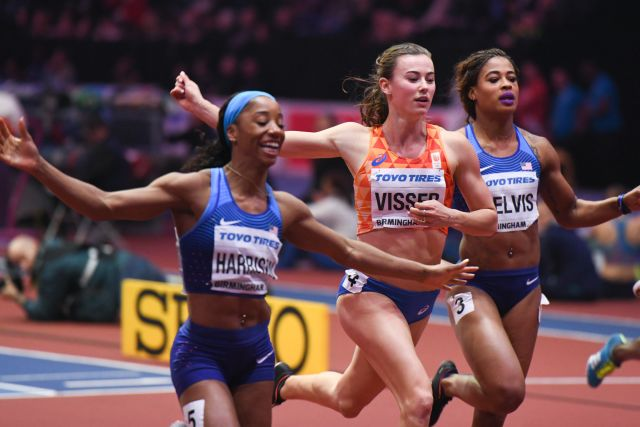
The finish of the race

The final was started on 3 March at 20:55.

Rank	Lane	Name	Nationality	Time	Notes
1st place, gold medalist(s)	5	Kendra Harrison	United States	7.70	CR
2nd place, silver medalist(s)	6	Christina Manning	United States	7.79	
3rd place, bronze medalist(s)	4	Nadine Visser	Netherlands	7.84	
4	3	Sharika Nelvis	United States	7.86	
5	7	Cindy Roleder	Germany	7.87	
6	2	Isabelle Pedersen	Norway	7.94	
7	1	Oluwatobiloba Amusan	Nigeria	8.05	
8	8	Devynne Charlton	Bahamas	8.18	
