= 2018 European Athletics Championships – Women's 100 metres hurdles =

Women's 100 metres at the 2018 European Athletics Championships
- Venue: Olympic Stadium
- Location: Berlin
- Dates: August 8 (round 1); August 9 (semifinals & final)
- Competitors: 32 from 18 nations
- Winning time: 12.67

Medalists
gold medal	Elvira Herman	Belarus
silver medal	Pamela Dutkiewicz	Germany
bronze medal	Cindy Roleder	Germany

The women's 100 metres hurdles at the 2018 European Athletics Championships took place at the Olympic Stadium on 8 and 9 August.

== Records ==
Standing records prior to the 2018 European Athletics Championships
World record	Kendra Harrison (USA)	12.20	London, Great Britain	22 July 2016
European record	Yordanka Donkova (BUL)	12.21	Stara Zagora, Bulgaria	20 August 1988
Championship record	Yordanka Donkova (BUL)	12.38	Stuttgart, West Germany	29 August 1986
World Leading	Kendra Harrison (USA)	12.36	London, Great Britain	22 July 2018
European Leading	Alina Talay (BLR)	12.41	Sankt Pölten, Austria	31 May 2018

== Schedule ==
Date	Time	Round
8 August 2018	10:10	Round 1
9 August 2018	19:25	Semifinals
9 August 2018	21:50	Final

All times are local times (UTC+2)

== Results ==
=== Round 1 ===
First 3 in each heat (Q) and the next fastest 2 (q) advance to the Semifinals. 13 fastest entrants awarded bye to Semifinals.

Rank	Heat	Lane	Name	Nationality	Time	Note
1	2	7	Solène Ndama	France	12.88	Q, PB
2	3	3	Karolina Kołeczek	Poland	12.96	Q, SB
3	1	5	Ricarda Lobe	Germany	13.03	Q
4	3	5	Beate Schrott	Austria	13.06	Q, SB
5	2	4	Elisavet Pesiridou	Greece	13.10	Q
6	3	6	Laura Valette	France	13.16	Q
7	3	7	Anamaria Nesteriuc	Romania	13.16	q
8	1	3	Caridad Jerez	Spain	13.19	Q, SB
9	1	6	Reetta Hurske	Finland	13.21	Q
10	1	7	Luminosa Bogliolo	Italy	13.21	q
11	3	8	Franziska Hofmann	Germany	13.23	
12	2	6	Gréta Kerekes	Hungary	13.23	Q
13	1	8	Ivana Lončarek	Croatia	13.23	
14	1	4	Hanna Plotitsyna	Ukraine	13.23	
15	2	2	Annimari Korte	Finland	13.31	
16	2	5	Elisa Di Lazzaro	Italy	13.42	
17	2	8	Elin Westerlund	Sweden	13.42	
18	2	3	Natalia Christofi	Cyprus	13.53	
19	3	4	Klaudia Sorok	Hungary	13.93	

=== Semifinals ===
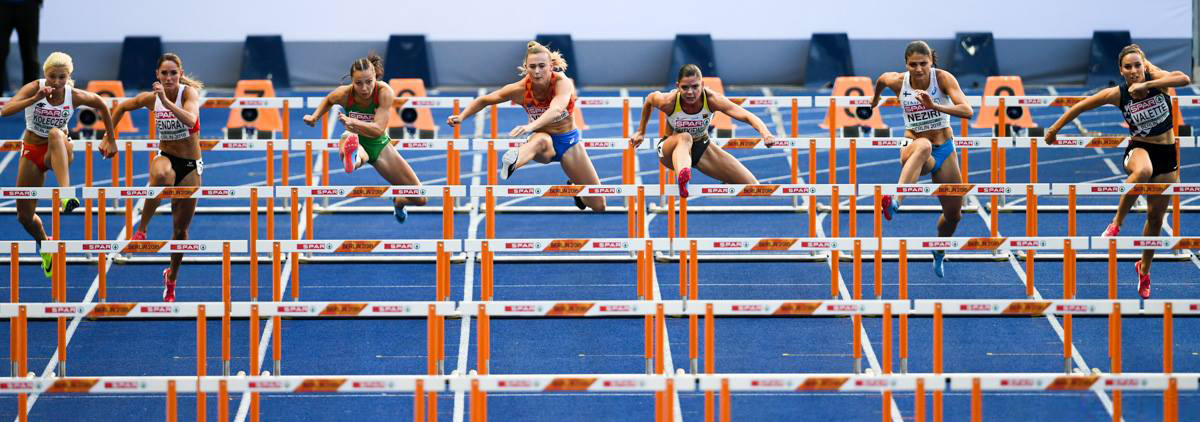
Semifinal 3

First 2 (Q) and next 2 fastest (q) qualify for the final.

Rank	Heat	Lane	Name	Nationality	Time	Note
1	3	4	Pamela Dutkiewicz*	Germany	12.71	Q
2	2	4	Elvira Herman*	Belarus	12.76	Q
3	2	6	Solène Ndama	France	12.77	Q, PB
4	1	3	Cindy Roleder*	Germany	12.83	Q
5	3	5	Nadine Visser*	Netherlands	12.84	Q
6	2	7	Ricarda Lobe	Germany	12.90	q, PB
7	3	8	Karolina Kołeczek	Poland	12.94	q, SB
8	3	3	Nooralotta Neziri*	Finland	12.94	
9	2	5	Eline Berings*	Belgium	12.94	
10	2	3	Eefje Boons*	Netherlands	12.94	
11	1	4	Alina Talay*	Belarus	12.96	Q
12	3	6	Luca Kozák*	Hungary	12.96	
13	1	2	Elisavet Pesiridou	Greece	13.00	SB
14	1	5	Isabelle Pedersen*	Norway	13.04	
15	1	8	Luminosa Bogliolo	Italy	13.09	
16	2	8	Klaudia Siciarz*	Poland	13.12	
17	1	6	Andrea Ivančević*	Croatia	13.13	
18	2	1	Reetta Hurske	Finland	13.20	
19	3	2	Laura Valette	France	13.22	
20	1	7	Gréta Kerekes	Hungary	13.23	
21	2	2	Beate Schrott	Austria	13.23	
22	3	1	Anamaria Nesteriuc	Romania	13.26	
23	3	7	Stephanie Bendrat*	Austria	13.43	
24	1	1	Caridad Jerez	Spain	15.34	

*Athletes who received a bye to the semifinals

=== Final ===
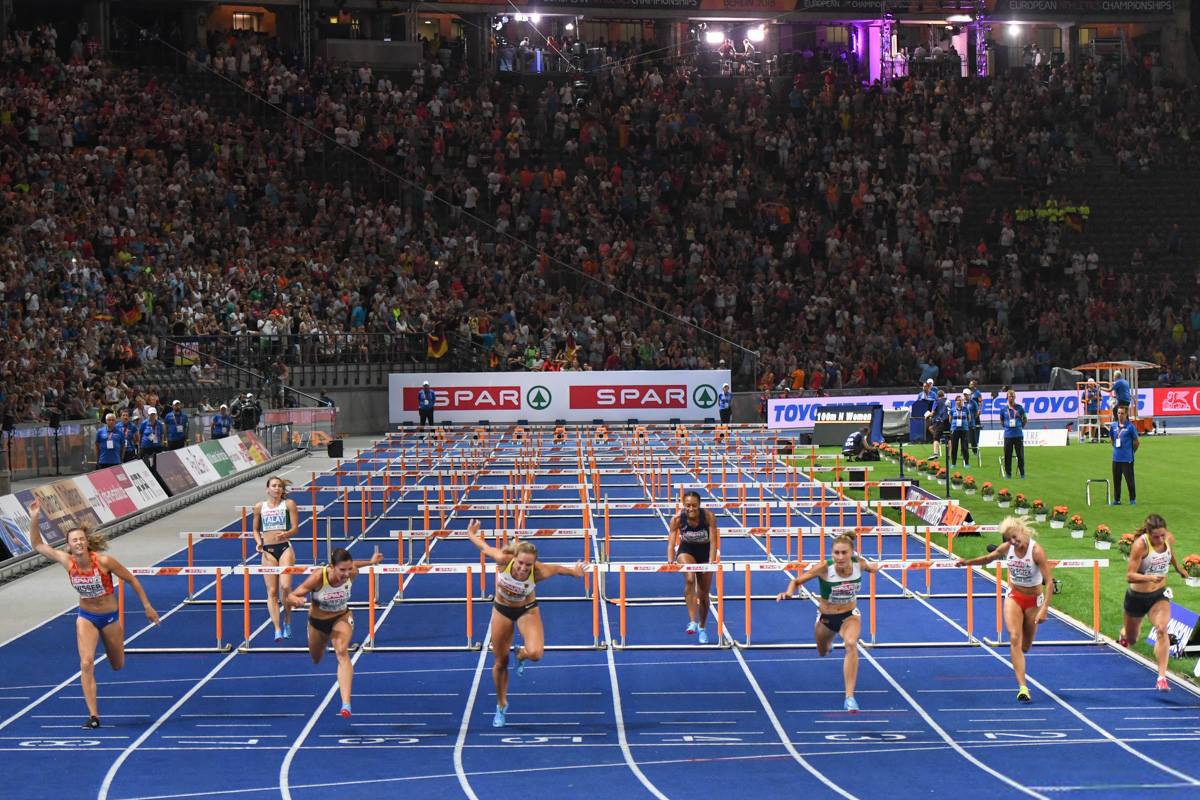
The final

Wind: -0.5 m/s

Rank	Lane	Name	Nationality	Time	Note
1st place, gold medalist(s)	3	Elvira Herman	Belarus	12.67	
2nd place, silver medalist(s)	6	Pamela Dutkiewicz	Germany	12.72	
3rd place, bronze medalist(s)	5	Cindy Roleder	Germany	12.77	SB
4	8	Nadine Visser	Netherlands	12.88	
5	1	Ricarda Lobe	Germany	13.00	
6	2	Karolina Kołeczek	Poland	13.11	
	4	Solène Ndama	France	DQ	168.7 (b)
	7	Alina Talay	Belarus	DQ	168.7 (b)
