= Athletics at the 2017 Summer Universiade – Women's 100 metres hurdles =

The women's 100 metres hurdles event at the 2017 Summer Universiade was held on 26 and 27 August at the Taipei Municipal Stadium in Taipei, Taiwan.

== Medalists ==
| Gold | Silver | Bronze |
|---|---|---|
| Nadine Visser; Netherlands | Elvira Herman; Belarus | Luca Kozák; Hungary |

== Results ==
=== Heats ===
Qualification: First 4 in each heat (Q) and next 4 fastest (q) qualified for the semifinals.

Wind:
Heat 1: -1.8 m/s, Heat 2: -0.9 m/s, Heat 3: +0.8 m/s, Heat 4: +1.3 m/s, Heat 5: +0.6 m/s

| Rank | Heat | Name | Nationality | Time | Notes |
|---|---|---|---|---|---|
| 1 | 4 | Nadine Visser | Netherlands | 13.15 | Q |
| 2 | 5 | Elvira Herman | Belarus | 13.22 | Q |
| 3 | 3 | Karolina Kołeczek | Poland | 13.42 | Q |
| 4 | 1 | Michelle Jenneke | Australia | 13.44 | Q |
| 5 | 2 | Gréta Kerekes | Hungary | 13.50 | Q |
| 5 | 5 | Stephanie Bendrat | Austria | 13.50 | Q |
| 7 | 3 | Reetta Hurske | Finland | 13.53 | Q |
| 8 | 5 | Sarah Lavin | Ireland | 13.54 | Q |
| 9 | 4 | Anamaria Nesteriuc | Romania | 13.58 | Q |
| 10 | 1 | Lotta Harala | Finland | 13.61 | Q |
| 11 | 4 | Ivana Lončarek | Croatia | 13.62 | Q |
| 12 | 2 | Laura Valette | France | 13.68 | Q |
| 13 | 1 | Luca Kozák | Hungary | 13.73 | Q |
| 14 | 3 | Alicia Barrett | Great Britain | 13.75 | Q |
| 15 | 5 | Hsieh Hsi-en | Chinese Taipei | 13.77 | Q |
| 16 | 3 | Mette Graversgaard | Denmark | 13.82 | Q |
| 17 | 5 | Karelle Edwards | Canada | 13.86 | q |
| 18 | 2 | Lui Lai Yiu | Hong Kong | 13.88 | Q |
| 19 | 2 | Aigerim Shynazbekova | Kazakhstan | 13.95 | Q |
| 20 | 3 | Ivana Petković | Serbia | 13.97 | q |
| 21 | 2 | Tijuana Thevenin | Canada | 13.98 | q |
| 22 | 1 | Luminosa Bogliolo | Italy | 13.99 | Q |
| 23 | 1 | Diana Suumann | Estonia | 14.06 | q |
| 24 | 4 | Joni Tomičić Prezelj | Slovenia | 14.11 | Q |
| 25 | 2 | Lin Shih-ting | Chinese Taipei | 14.30 | |
| 26 | 4 | Wang Yuke | China | 14.35 | |
| 27 | 5 | Karel Ziketh | Ivory Coast | 14.40 | |
| 28 | 4 | Maryke Brits | South Africa | 14.43 | |
| 29 | 5 | Oryngul Zkriyenova | Kazakhstan | 14.48 | |
| 30 | 1 | Oneida Valerio | Dominican Republic | 14.68 | |
| 31 | 1 | Selina von Jackowski | Switzerland | 14.69 | |
| 32 | 3 | Elizabeth Clay | Australia | 14.92 | |
| 33 | 4 | Christel El Saneh | Lebanon | 15.44 | |
| 34 | 3 | Iris Santamaría | El Salvador | 17.32 | |

=== Semifinals ===
Qualification: First 2 in each heat (Q) and the next 2 fastest (q) qualified for the final.

Wind:
Heat 1: -2.5 m/s, Heat 2: -1.8 m/s, Heat 3: -3.0 m/s

| Rank | Heat | Name | Nationality | Time | Notes |
|---|---|---|---|---|---|
| 1 | 1 | Nadine Visser | Netherlands | 13.17 | Q |
| 2 | 2 | Elvira Herman | Belarus | 13.31 | Q |
| 3 | 1 | Luca Kozák | Hungary | 13.38 | Q |
| 4 | 2 | Anamaria Nesteriuc | Romania | 13.41 | Q |
| 5 | 3 | Karolina Kołeczek | Poland | 13.48 | Q |
| 6 | 3 | Michelle Jenneke | Australia | 13.55 | Q |
| 7 | 2 | Gréta Kerekes | Hungary | 13.63 | q |
| 8 | 1 | Stephanie Bendrat | Austria | 13.64 | q |
| 9 | 2 | Sarah Lavin | Ireland | 13.64 | |
| 10 | 3 | Laura Valette | France | 13.64 | |
| 11 | 1 | Reetta Hurske | Finland | 13.67 | |
| 12 | 3 | Lotta Harala | Finland | 13.71 | |
| 13 | 2 | Alicia Barrett | Great Britain | 13.75 | |
| 14 | 1 | Ivana Lončarek | Croatia | 13.92 | |
| 15 | 1 | Aigerim Shynazbekova | Kazakhstan | 13.93 | |
| 16 | 2 | Tijuana Thevenin | Canada | 13.96 | |
| 17 | 1 | Luminosa Bogliolo | Italy | 13.99 | |
| 18 | 3 | Ivana Petković | Serbia | 14.05 | |
| 19 | 3 | Lui Lai Yiu | Hong Kong | 14.07 | |
| 20 | 2 | Mette Graversgaard | Denmark | 14.12 | |
| 21 | 1 | Diana Suumann | Estonia | 14.17 | |
| 22 | 3 | Hsieh Hsi-en | Chinese Taipei | 14.19 | |
| 23 | 2 | Joni Tomičić Prezelj | Slovenia | 14.41 | |
| | 3 | Karelle Edwards | Canada | DNF | |

=== Final ===
Wind: -1.3 m/s

Official Video

| Rank | Lane | Name | Nationality | Time | Notes |
|---|---|---|---|---|---|
| 1st place, gold medalist(s) | 5 | Nadine Visser | Netherlands | 12.98 | |
| 2nd place, silver medalist(s) | 6 | Elvira Herman | Belarus | 13.17 | |
| 3rd place, bronze medalist(s) | 7 | Luca Kozák | Hungary | 13.19 | |
| 4 | 4 | Karolina Kołeczek | Poland | 13.31 | |
| 5 | 8 | Anamaria Nesteriuc | Romania | 13.35 | |
| 6 | 2 | Gréta Kerekes | Hungary | 13.38 | |
| 7 | 3 | Stephanie Bendrat | Austria | 13.74 | |
| 8 | 9 | Michelle Jenneke | Australia | 14.82 | |
