= Karolina Kołeczek =

Polish hurdler (born 1993)

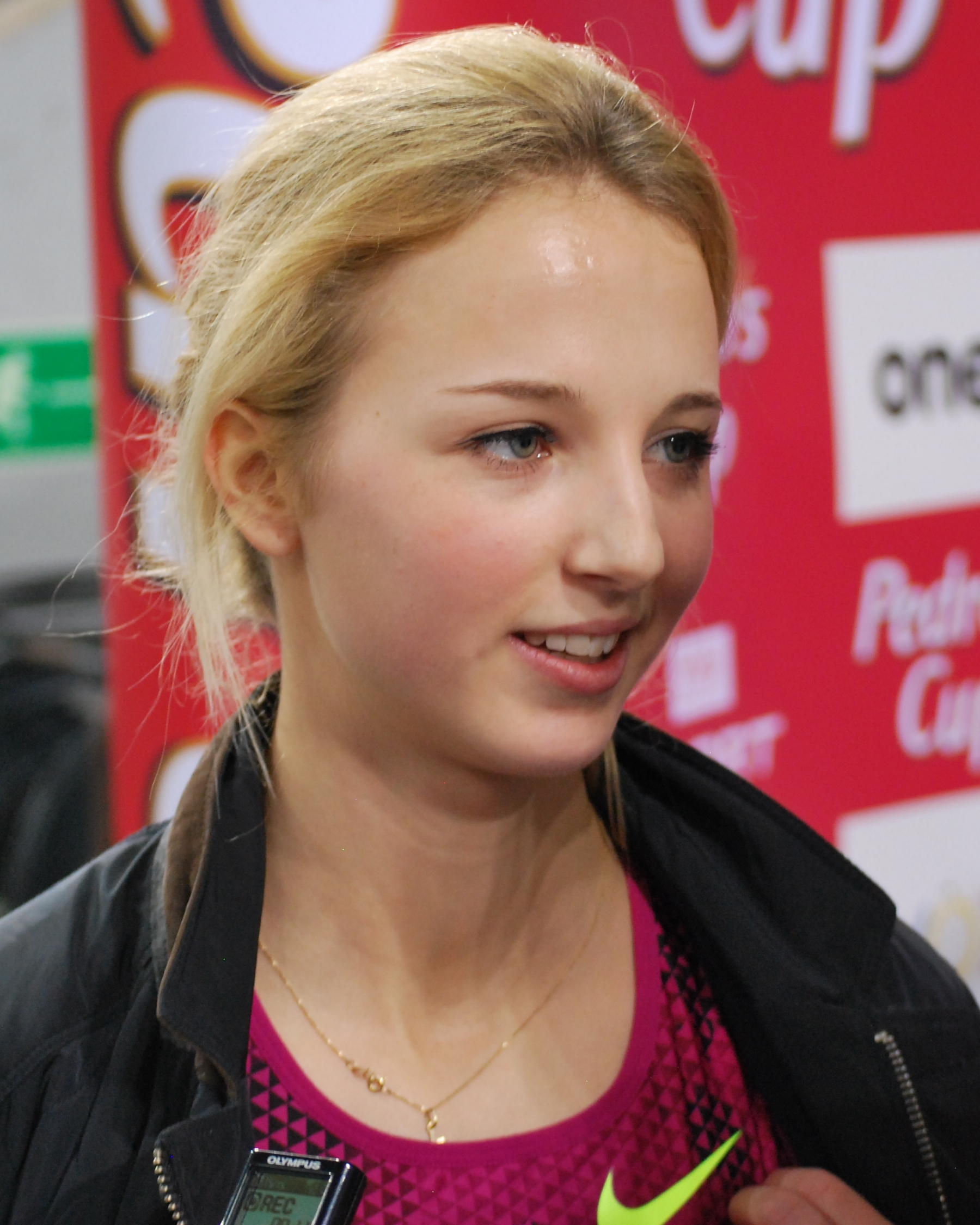
- Karolina Kołeczek in 2015

Personal information
- Nationality: Polish
- Born: 15 January 1993 (age 33) Sandomierz, Poland
- Height: 1.69 m (5 ft 7 in)
- Weight: 54 kg (119 lb)

Sport
- Sport: Track and field
- Event: 100 metres hurdles
- Club: AZS UMCS LUBLIN
- Coached by: Piotr Maruszewski
Medal record
Athletics
Representing Poland
European Team Championships
Bronze medal – third place	2019 Bydgoszcz	100 m hurdles
European U23 Championships
Silver medal – second place	2013 Tampere	100 m hurdles
Silver medal – second place	2015 Tallinn	100 m hurdles

Karolina Kołeczek (born 15 January 1993 in Sandomierz) is a retired Polish athlete who specialised in the 100 metres hurdles. She won silver medals at two consecutive European U23 Championships. She last competed in 2024 and officially retired a year later.

She has personal bests of 12.75 seconds in the 100 metres hurdles (+0.3 m/s, Chorzów 2019) and 8.03 seconds in the 60 metres hurdles (Toruń 2019).

== Competition record ==
Year	Competition	Venue	Position	Event	Notes
Representing Poland
2010	Youth Olympic Games	Singapore	–	100 m hurdles (76.2 cm)	DNF
2011	European Junior Championships	Tallinn, Estonia	10th (sf)	100 m hurdles	14.03
2012	World Junior Championships	Barcelona, Spain	9th (sf)	100 m hurdles	13.66
2013	European U23 Championships	Tampere, Finland	2nd	100 m hurdles	13.30
2014	European Championships	Zürich, Switzerland	15th (sf)	100 m hurdles	13.10
2015	European Indoor Championships	Prague, Czech Republic	12th (sf)	60 m hurdles	8.05
2015	European U23 Championships	Tallinn, Estonia	2nd	100 m hurdles	12.92
2015	World Championships	Beijing, China	15th (sf)	100 m hurdles	12.97
2016	European Championships	Amsterdam, Netherlands	15th (sf)	100 m hurdles	13.09
2016	Olympic Games	Rio de Janeiro, Brazil	26th (h)	100 m hurdles	13.04
2017	European Indoor Championships	Belgrade, Serbia	19th (h)	60 m hurdles	8.28
2017	Universiade	Taipei, Taiwan	4th	100 m hurdles	13.31
2017	DécaNation	Angers, France	2nd	100 m hurdles	13.13
2018	World Indoor Championships	Birmingham, United Kingdom	21st (sf)	60 m hurdles	8.21
2018	European Championships	Berlin, Germany	6th	100 m hurdles	13.11
2019	European Indoor Championships	Glasgow, United Kingdom	23rd (h)	60 m hurdles	8.37
2019	World Championships	Doha, Qatar	12th (sf)	100 m hurdles	12.86
2021	European Indoor Championships	Toruń, Poland	14th (sf)	60 m hurdles	8.12
