= 2012 World Junior Championships in Athletics – Women's 100 metres hurdles =

The women's 100 metres hurdles at the 2012 World Junior Championships in Athletics was held at the Estadi Olímpic Lluís Companys on 13, 14, and 15 July.

== Medalists ==
Gold	Silver	Bronze
Morgan Snow; United States	Noemi Zbären; Switzerland	Ekaterina Bleskina; Russia

== Records ==
Prior to the competition, the existing world junior and championship records were as follows.

World Junior Record	Aliuska López (CUB)	12.84	Zagreb, Yugoslavia	16 July 1987
Championship Record	Aliuska López (CUB)	12.96	Sudbury, Canada	29 July 1988
World Junior Leading	Ekaterina Bleskina (RUS)	13.11	Cheboksary, Russia	19 June 2012

== Results ==
=== Heats ===
Qualification: The first 3 of each heat (Q) and the 6 fastest times (q) qualified

Rank	Heat	Lane	Name	Nationality	Time	Note
1	4	7	Noemi Zbären	Switzerland	13.34	Q
2	3	4	Ekaterina Bleskina	Russia	13.42	Q
2	1	4	Franziska Hofmann	Germany	13.42	Q
4	6	3	Morgan Snow	United States	13.44	Q
5	1	8	Dior Hall	United States	13.45	Q, SB
6	3	8	Katarina Johnson-Thompson	Great Britain	13.48	Q, PB
7	4	2	Alexandra Burghardt	Germany	13.49	Q, PB
8	2	7	Michelle Jenneke	Australia	13.52	Q
9	1	3	Samantha Scarlett	Jamaica	13.62	Q, PB
10	5	5	Sade Mariah Greenidge	Barbados	13.63	Q
11	6	4	Chrisdale McCarthy	Jamaica	13.68	Q
12	2	8	Dou Wang	China	13.71	Q
13	1	6	Lilla Juhász	Hungary	13.73	q, PB
14	3	7	Jonna Berghem	Finland	13.78	Q
15	1	9	Shakera Hall	Barbados	13.80	q
16	5	6	Deshaunda Morrison	Canada	13.83	Q
17	5	4	Karolina Koleczek	Poland	13.88	Q
18	2	6	Sarah Lavin	Ireland	13.90	Q
19	6	9	Mizuki Kugai	Japan	13.92	Q
20	6	8	Suzanne Williams	Netherlands	13.94	q
21	4	3	Mako Fukube	Japan	13.96	Q
22	4	8	Manca Šepetavc	Slovenia	13.97	q
23	6	5	Anastasia Nikolaeva	Russia	13.97	q
24	2	2	Nicole Setterington	Canada	13.98	q
25	1	7	Ching-Ju Hsieh	Chinese Taipei	14.02	
26	6	6	Anamaria Nesteriuc	Romania	14.03	PB
27	5	2	Sophie Jancsurák	Hungary	14.04	
28	3	6	Abbie Taddeo	Australia	14.05	
29	3	5	Giada Carmassi	Italy	14.09	
29	5	3	Jana Sotáková	Czech Republic	14.09	
31	2	3	Eva Wimberger	Austria	14.11	PB
31	4	4	Mathilde Heltbech	Denmark	14.11	
33	5	8	Vera Fernandes	Portugal	14.14	PB
34	2	5	Jatta-Juulia Hanski	Finland	14.15	
34	1	5	Marthe Koala	Burkina Faso	14.15	SB
36	2	9	Devynne Charlton	Bahamas	14.20	
37	4	5	Devinn Cartwright	Bahamas	14.21	PB
38	3	9	Kayla Gilbert	South Africa	14.23	
39	6	7	Laura Strajnar	Slovenia	14.29	
40	5	7	Natshalie Isaac	Puerto Rico	14.35	
41	1	2	Maria Paniz	Italy	14.36	
42	2	4	Génesis Romero	Venezuela	14.42	
43	4	9	Beyza Tilki	Turkey	14.76	
	3	3	Ida Bakke Hansen	Norway	DQ	
	4	6	Yuliya Dolzhkova	Ukraine	DNF	
	5	9	Teresa Errandonea	Spain	DNS	

=== Semi-final ===
Qualification: The first 2 of each heat (Q) and the 2 fastest times (q) qualified

Rank	Heat	Lane	Name	Nationality	Time	Note
1	1	5	Ekaterina Bleskina	Russia	13.24	Q
2	1	6	Morgan Snow	United States	13.31	Q
3	2	6	Dou Wang	China	13.40	Q, PB
4	2	7	Michelle Jenneke	Australia	13.41	Q
5	3	5	Noemi Zbären	Switzerland	13.46	Q
6	2	5	Franziska Hofmann	Germany	13.53	q
7	2	9	Jonna Berghem	Finland	13.64	q
8	1	4	Chrisdale McCarthy	Jamaica	13.65	
9	1	9	Karolina Kołeczek	Poland	13.66	
10	3	7	Dior Hall	United States	13.78	Q
11	1	3	Suzanne Williams	Netherlands	13.79	
12	3	9	Samantha Scarlett	Jamaica	13.88	
13	3	8	Mako Fukube	Japan	13.92	
14	2	4	Katarina Johnson-Thompson	United Kingdom	13.94	
15	2	2	Nicole Setterington	Canada	13.99	
16	2	8	Mizuki Kugai	Japan	14.00	
17	3	4	Deshaunda Morrison	Canada	14.03	
18	3	2	Anastasia Nikolaeva	Russia	14.04	
19	1	7	Alexandra Burghardt	Germany	14.07	
20	2	3	Shakera Hall	Barbados	14.10	
21	3	3	Lilla Juhász	Hungary	14.14	
22	1	2	Manca Šepetavc	Slovenia	14.24	
	1	8	Sarah Lavin	Ireland	DNF	
	3	6	Sade Mariah Greenidge	Barbados	DQ	

=== Final ===
Rank	Lane	Name	Nationality	Time	Note
1st place, gold medalist(s)	7	Morgan Snow	United States	13.38	
2nd place, silver medalist(s)	5	Noemi Zbären	Switzerland	13.43	
3rd place, bronze medalist(s)	4	Ekaterina Bleskina	Russia	13.51	
4	2	Franziska Hofmann	Germany	13.54	
5	9	Michelle Jenneke	Australia	13.54	
6	3	Jonna Berghem	Finland	13.56	PB
7	6	Dou Wang	China	13.58	
	8	Dior Hall	United States	DQ	

== Participation ==
According to an unofficial count, 45 athletes from 32 countries participated in the event.

- Australia (2)
- Austria (1)
- Bahamas (2)
- Barbados (2)
- Burkina Faso (1)
- Canada (2)
- China (1)
- Chinese Taipei (1)
- Czech Republic (1)
- Denmark (1)
- Finland (2)
- Germany (2)
- Hungary (2)
- Ireland (1)
- Italy (2)
- Jamaica (2)
- Japan (2)
- Netherlands (1)
- Norway (1)
- Poland (1)
- Portugal (1)
- Puerto Rico (1)
- Romania (1)
- Russia (2)
- Slovenia (2)
- South Africa (1)
- Switzerland (1)
- Turkey (1)
- Ukraine (1)
- United Kingdom (1)
- United States (2)
- Venezuela (1)
