= Luca Kozák =

Hungarian hurdler (born 1996)

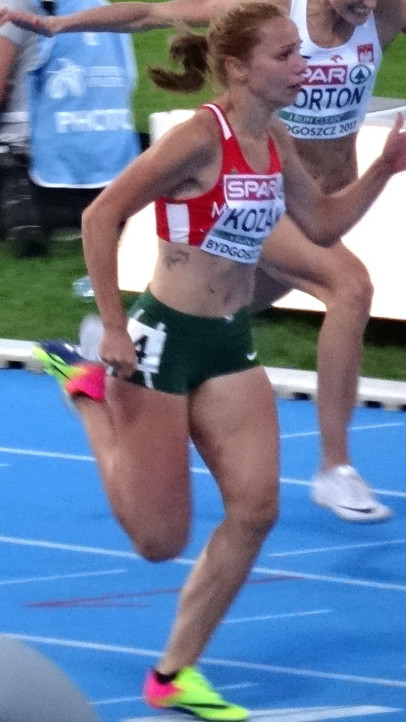
- Luca Kozák in 2017

Personal information
- Born: 1 June 1996 (age 30) Debrecen, Hungary
- Education: University of Debrecen

Sport
- Sport: Athletics
- Event: 100 m hurdles
- Club: Debreceni SC
Medal record
Women's athletics
Representing Hungary
European Championships
Silver medal – second place	2022 Munich	100 m hurdles

Luca Kozák (born 1 June 1996) is a Hungarian athlete specialising in the sprint hurdles. She represented her country at the 2016 World Indoor Championships without qualifying for the final. In addition she won the silver medal at the 2015 European Junior Championships.

Her personal bests are 12.71 seconds in the 100 metres hurdles (-0.2 m/s, Székesfehérvár) and 7.97 seconds in the 60 metres hurdles (Glasgow 2019, Torun and Budapest 2020). Both times are Hungarian Records.

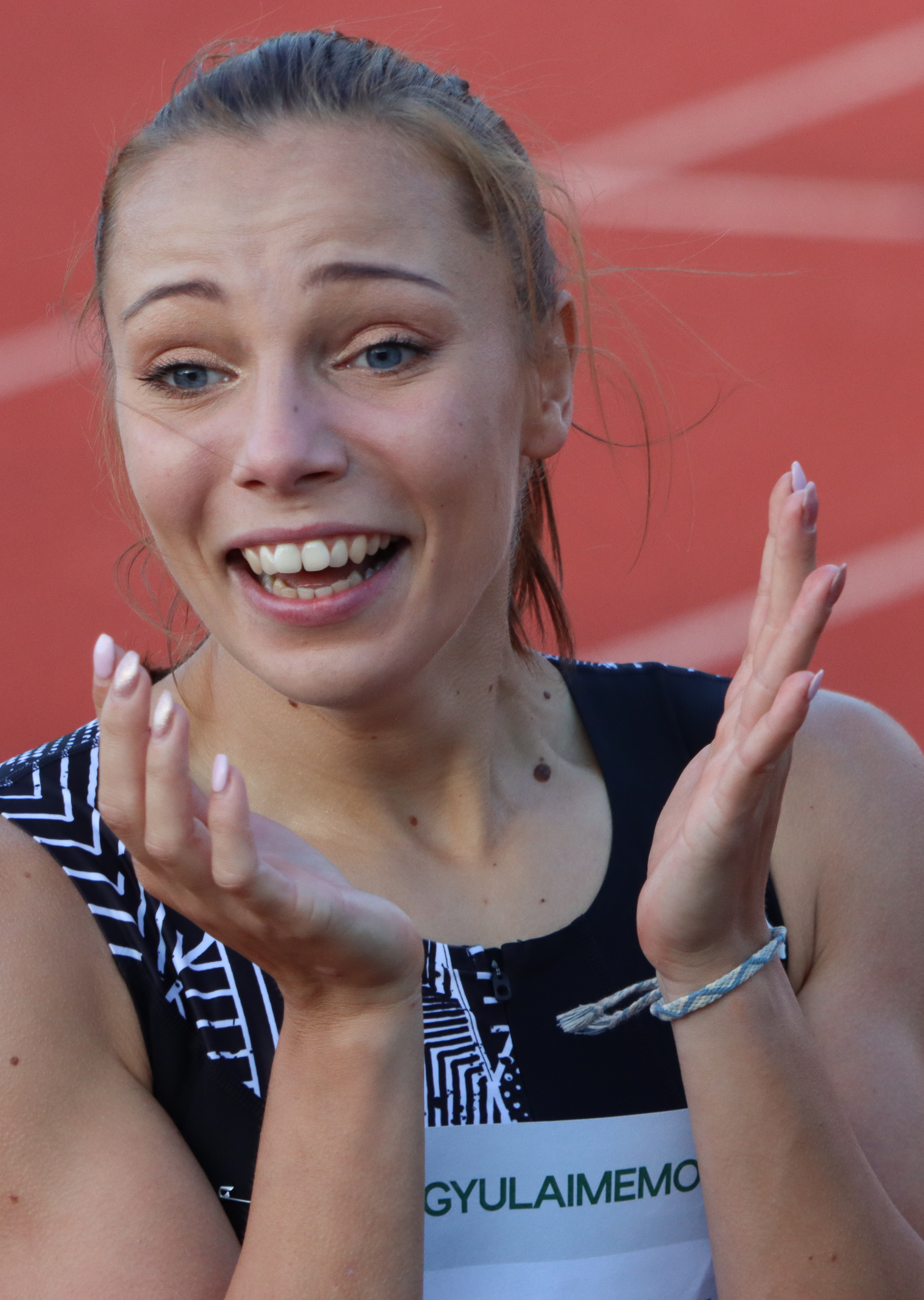
Luca Kozak after breaking the Hungarian 100m hurdles record at the 2020 Gyulai István Memorial in Székesfehérvár, Hungary

== Competition record ==
Year	Competition	Venue	Position	Event	Notes
Representing Hungary
2013	World Youth Championships	Donetsk, Ukraine	7th	100 m hurdles (76.2 cm)	13.62
2014	World Junior Championships	Eugene, United States	15th (sf)	100 m hurdles	13.58 (w)
2015	European Junior Championships	Eskilstuna, Sweden	2nd	100 m hurdles	13.20
2016	World Indoor Championships	Portland, United States	18th (h)	60 m hurdles	8.46
2016	European Championships	Amsterdam, Netherlands	16th (h)	100 m hurdles	13.30
2017	European Indoor Championships	Belgrade, Serbia	13th (sf)	60 m hurdles	8.27
2017	European U23 Championships	Bydgoszcz, Poland	3rd	100 m hurdles	13.06 (w)
2017	European U23 Championships	Bydgoszcz, Poland	6th	4 × 100 m relay	45.03
2017	World Championships	London, United Kingdom	28th (h)	100 m hurdles	13.17
2017	Universiade	Taipei, Taiwan	3rd	100 m hurdles	13.19
2018	World Indoor Championships	Birmingham, United Kingdom	23rd (sf)	60 m hurdles	8.24
2018	European Championships	Berlin, Germany	12th (sf)	100 m hurdles	12.96
2018	European Championships	Berlin, Germany	13th (h)	4 × 100 m relay	44.15
2019	European Indoor Championships	Glasgow, United Kingdom	1st (sf)	60 m hurdles	7.97^{1}
2019	World Championships	Doha, Qatar	13th (sf)	100 m hurdles	12.87
2021	European Indoor Championships	Toruń, Poland	8th	60 m hurdles	8.01
2021	Olympic Games	Tokyo, Japan	19th (h)	100 m hurdles	12.97^{2}
2022	European Championships	Munich, Germany	2nd	100 m hurdles	12.69
2023	World Championships	Budapest, Hungary	13th (sf)	100 m hurdles	12.73
2024	World Indoor Championships	Glasgow, United Kingdom	8th	60 m hurdles	8.01
2024	European Championships	Rome, Italy	16th (sf)	100 m hurdles	13.01
2024	Olympic Games	Paris, France	10th (rep)	100 m hurdles	12.96
2025	European Indoor Championships	Apeldoorn, Netherlands	6th (sf)	60 m hurdles	7.96^{3}
2025	World Championships	Tokyo, Japan	17th (sf)	100 m hurdles	13.01
2026	World Indoor Championships	Toruń, Poland	18th (sf)	60 m hurdles	8.01
2026	European Championships	Birmingham, Great Britain	5th	100 m hurdles	12.84
2026	European Championships	Birmingham, Great Britain	6th	4 × 100 m relay	43.33
2026	World Ultimate Championship	Budapest, Hungary	10th (h)	100 m hurdles	12.68

^{1}Did not start in the final
^{2}Did not finish in the semifinal
^{3}Did not finish in the final
