= Eefje Boons =

Dutch hurdler

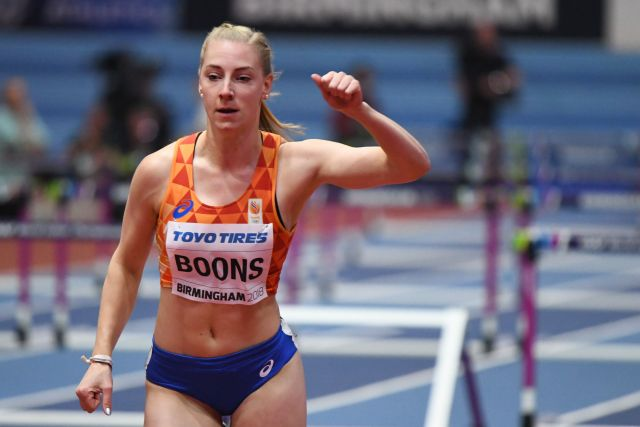
- Eefje Boons in 2018

Personal information
- Born: 18 July 1994 (age 31) Deventer, Netherlands
- Height: 1.76 m (5 ft 9 in)
- Weight: 68 kg (150 lb)

Sport
- Sport: Athletics
- Event: 100 m hurdles
- Club: AV Daventria 1906
- Coached by: Michel Knobbe

Eefje Boons (Dutch: [ˈeːfjə ˈboːns]; born 18 July 1994) is a Dutch hurdler. She competed in the women's 100 metres hurdles at the 2017 World Championships in Athletics.

Her personal bests are 12.86 seconds in the 100 metres hurdles (+1.7 m/s, Guadalajara 2018) and 8.10 seconds in the 60 metres hurdles (Athlone 2018).

== International competitions ==
Year	Competition	Venue	Position	Event	Notes
Representing the Netherlands
2013	European Junior Championships	Rieti, Italy	3rd	4 × 100 m relay	44.22
2015	European U23 Championships	Tallinn, Estonia	6th	100 m hurdles	13.35
2015	European U23 Championships	Tallinn, Estonia	4th	4 × 100 m relay	44.46
2016	European Championships	Amsterdam, Netherlands	19th (sf)	100 m hurdles	13.26
2017	World Championships	London, United Kingdom	32nd (h)	100 m hurdles	13.34
2018	World Indoor Championships	Birmingham, United Kingdom	24th (sf)	60 m hurdles	8.24
2018	European Championships	Berlin, Germany	10th (sf)	100 m hurdles	12.94
