= Elvira Herman =

Belarusian hurdler (born 1997)

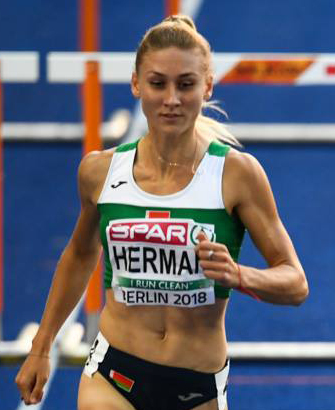
- Herman at the 2018 European Athletics Championships

Personal information
- Full name: Elvira Hrabarenka
- Born: January 9, 1997 (age 29) Pinsk, Belarus
- Education: Belarusian State University of Physical Education
- Height: 1.68 m (5 ft 6 in)
- Weight: 56 kg (123 lb)

Sport
- Sport: Athletics
- Event: 100 m hurdles
- Club: SK FPB
- Coached by: Victor Myasnkikov
Medal record
European Championships
Gold medal – first place	2018 Berlin	100 m hurdles
European Indoor Championships
Bronze medal – third place	2019 Glasgow	60 m hurdles

Elvira Uladzimirauna Herman (Belarusian: Эльвіра Уладзіміраўна Герман; born 9 January 1997) is a Belarusian athlete specialising in the sprint hurdles. She won the gold medal at the 2018 European Championships At the 2018 European Athletics Golden Tracks awards in Lausanne Elvira received the award as Europe's female rising star in 2018.

In 2019, she won the silver medal in the team event at the 2019 European Games held in Minsk, Belarus.

She has personal bests of 12.64 seconds in the 100 metres hurdles (Šamorín 2018) and 8.05 seconds in the 60 metres hurdles (Mogilyov 2018).

== International competitions ==
Year	Competition	Venue	Position	Event	Notes
Representing Belarus
2013	European Youth Olympic Festival	Utrecht, Netherlands	3rd	100 m hurdles (76.2 cm)	13.92 (w)
2013	European Youth Olympic Festival	Utrecht, Netherlands	6th	4 × 100 m relay	48.45
2014	Youth Olympic Games	Nanjing, China	2nd	100 m hurdles (76.2 cm)	13.38
2015	European Junior Championships	Eskilstuna, Sweden	1st	100 m hurdles	13.15
2016	European Championships	Amsterdam, Netherlands	16th (sf)	100 m hurdles	13.18
2016	World U20 Championship	Bydgoszcz, Poland	1st	100 m hurdles	12.85 CR
2017	European Indoor Championships	Belgrade, Serbia	16th (sf)	60 m hurdles	8.57
2017	European U23 Championships	Bydgoszcz, Poland	2nd	100 m hurdles	12.95 (w)
2017	World Championships	London, United Kingdom	19th (sf)	100 m hurdles	13.16
2017	Universiade	Taipei, Taiwan	2nd	100 m hurdles	13.17
2018	World Indoor Championships	Birmingham, United Kingdom	10th (sf)	60 m hurdles	8.06
2018	European Championships	Berlin, Germany	1st	100 m hurdles	12.67
2019	European Indoor Championships	Glasgow, United Kingdom	3rd	60 m hurdles	8.00
2019	European U23 Championships	Gävle, Sweden	1st	100 m hurdles	12.70
2019	World Championships	Doha, Qatar	9th (sf)	100 m hurdles	12.78
2021	European Indoor Championships	Toruń, Poland	10th (sf)	60 m hurdles	8.07
2021	Olympic Games	Tokyo, Japan	10th (sf)	100 m hurdles	12.71
2021	Olympic Games	Tokyo, Japan	15th (h)	4 × 400 m relay	3:33.00
