= Franziska Hofmann =

German hurdler (born 1994)

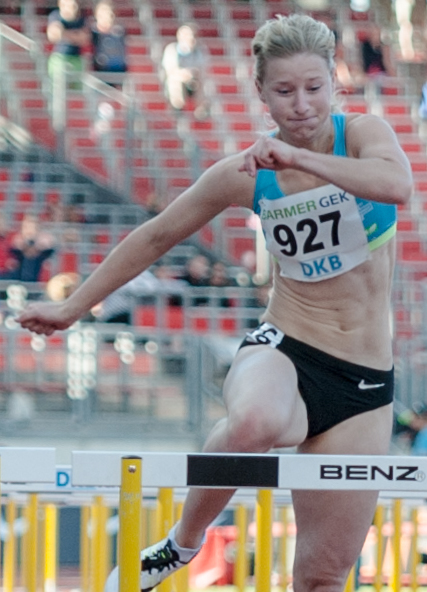
- Hofmann in 2015

Personal information
- Born: 27 March 1994 (age 31) Frankenberg, Saxony, Germany
- Height: 1.79 m (5 ft 10 in)
- Weight: 66 kg (146 lb)

Sport
- Sport: Athletics
- Event(s): 100 m hurdles, 60 m hurdles
- Club: LAC Erdgas Chemnitz
- Coached by: Michael Sperling; Jörg Bretschneider

Franziska Hofmann (born 27 March 1994) is a German athlete specialising in the sprint hurdles. She finished fourth at the 2015 European U23 Championships.

Her personal bests in the event are 12.87 seconds in the 100 metres hurdles (+2.0 m/s, Ulm 2014) and 8.12 seconds in the 60 metres hurdles (Chemnitz 2016).

== International competitions ==
| Year | Competition | Venue | Position | Event | Notes |
Representing Germany
| 2010 | Youth Olympic Games | Singapore | 7th | 100 m hurdles (76.2 cm) | 13.77 |
| 2011 | European Junior Championships | Tallinn, Estonia | 5th | 100 m hurdles | 13.80 |
| 2012 | World Junior Championships | Barcelona, Spain | 4th | 100 m hurdles | 13.54 |
| 2013 | European Junior Championships | Rieti, Italy | 2nd (sf) | 100 m hurdles | 13.38^{1} |
| 2014 | European Championships | Zürich, Switzerland | 14th (sf) | 100 m hurdles | 13.04 |
| 2015 | European U23 Championships | Tallinn, Estonia | 4th | 100 m hurdles | 13.17 |
| 2018 | European Championships | Berlin, Germany | 11th (h) | 100 m hurdles | 13.23 |

^{1}Disqualified in the final
