= Nadine Visser =

Dutch track and field athlete (born 1995)

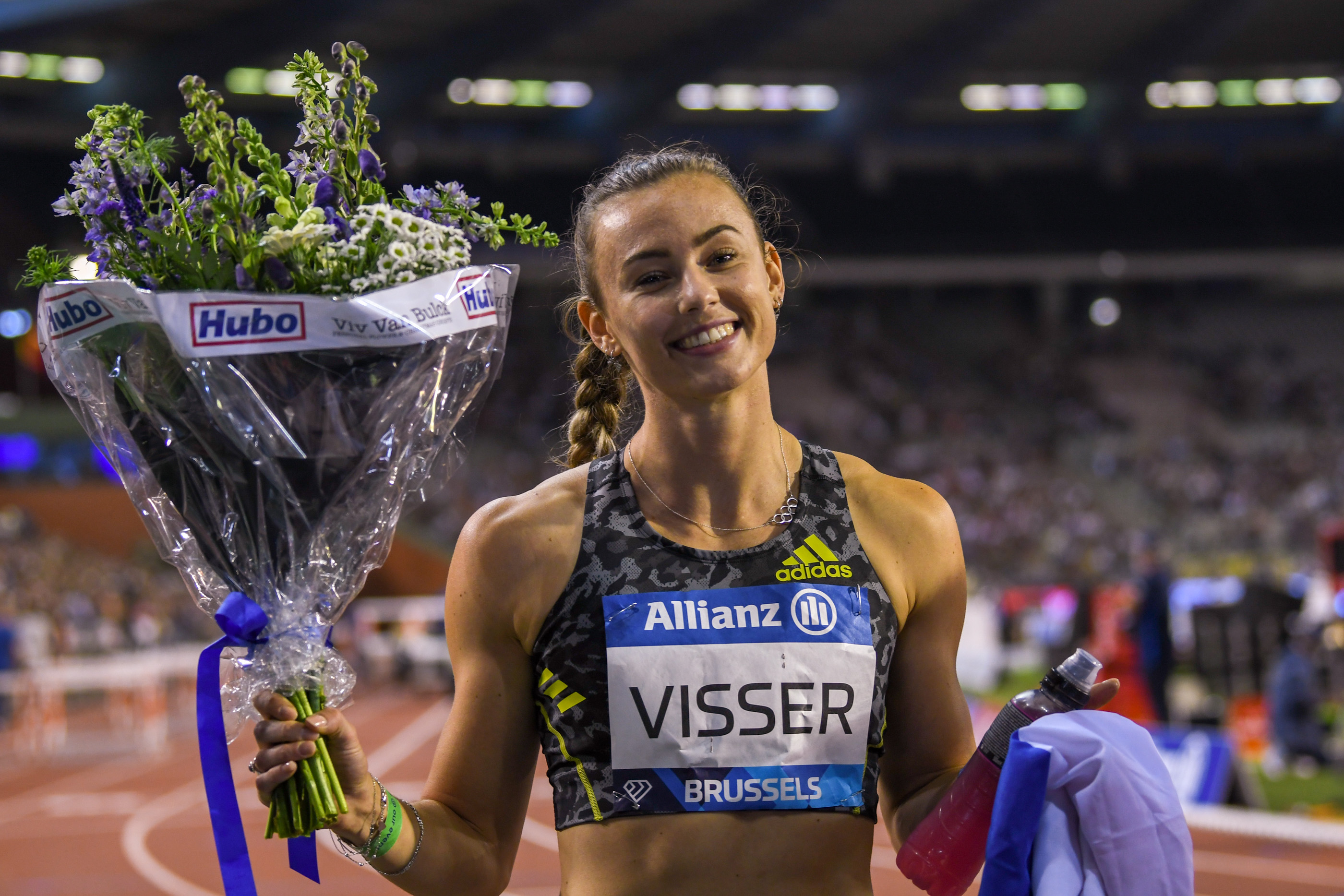
- Visser at the 2021 Memorial Van Damme in Brussels

Personal information
- Born: 9 February 1995 (age 31) Hoorn, Netherlands
- Height: 1.75 m (5 ft 9 in)
- Weight: 60 kg (132 lb)

Sport
- Country: Netherlands
- Sport: Athletics
- Events: 100 metres hurdles 60 metres hurdles
- Coached by: Bart Bennema

Achievements and titles
- Highest world ranking: No. 3 (100 m hurdles); No. 45 (overall)
- Personal bests: 60 mH: 7.72 i (2025, NR); 100 mH: 12.28 (2025, NR)
Medal record
Women's athletics
Representing the Netherlands
World Ultimate Championship
Third place	2026 Budapest	100 m hurdles
World Relays
Bronze medal – third place	2021 Chorzów	4 × 100 m relay
World Indoor Championships
Silver medal – second place	2026 Toruń	60 m hurdles
Bronze medal – third place	2018 Birmingham	60 m hurdles
European Championships
Gold medal – first place	2026 Birmingham	100 m hurdles
Bronze medal – third place	2024 Rome	4 × 100 m relay
European Indoor Championships
Gold medal – first place	2019 Glasgow	60 m hurdles
Gold medal – first place	2021 Torun	60 m hurdles
Silver medal – second place	2023 Istanbul	60 m hurdles
Silver medal – second place	2025 Apeldoorn	60 m hurdles
European Games
Silver medal – second place	2023 Kraków-Małopolska	100 m hurdles
European U23 Championships
Gold medal – first place	2017 Bydgoszcz	100 m hurdles
Bronze medal – third place	2015 Tallinn	100 m hurdles
World Junior Championships
Bronze medal – third place	2014 Eugene	100 m hurdles
Bronze medal – third place	2014 Eugene	Heptathlon
European Youth Olympic Festival
Gold medal – first place	2011 Trabzon	100 m hurdles
Gold medal – first place	2011 Trabzon	4 × 100 m relay
Universiade
Gold medal – first place	2017 Taipei	100 m hurdles

Nadine Visser (Dutch: [naːˈdinə ˈvɪsər]; born 9 February 1995) is a Dutch track and field athlete who competed in the combined events until 2017 and has specialized in short hurdling since 2018.

Visser won the bronze medal in the 60 metres hurdles at the 2018 World Indoor Championships. She claimed gold medals in the event at the 2019 and 2021 European Indoor Championships, and silver at the 2023 edition. She earned bronze and gold in the 100 metres hurdles at the 2015 and 2017 European Under-23 Championships respectively.

Visser was the 2014 World Junior Championships bronze medallist for the heptathlon and 100 m hurdles. She also won gold in the 100 m hurdles at the 2017 Universiade. She represented Netherlands at the 2016 Rio, 2020 Tokyo and 2024 Paris Olympics. Visser is the Dutch record holder for the 100 m hurdles and Dutch indoor record holder for the 60 m hurdles. She is a multiple national champion. She is coached by Bart Bennema, who was also the coach of Dafne Schippers.

== Career ==
=== Early career ===
Visser's first sports were gymnastics and football; she took up athletics at age 13. She represented the Netherlands at the 2011 European Youth Olympic Festival in Trabzon, winning gold medal in both the 100 m hurdles and 4 × 100 metres relay.

Visser competed as a heptathlete at the 2012 World Junior Championships in Barcelona, placing eleventh with 5447 points. In 2013, she placed fourth in the heptathlon at the European Junior Championships in Rieti, scoring 5774 points. In the heptathlon's opening event, the 100 m hurdles, she ran 13.21 s (+1.5 m/s) to break Dafne Schippers' Dutch junior record from 2011.

=== 2014 ===
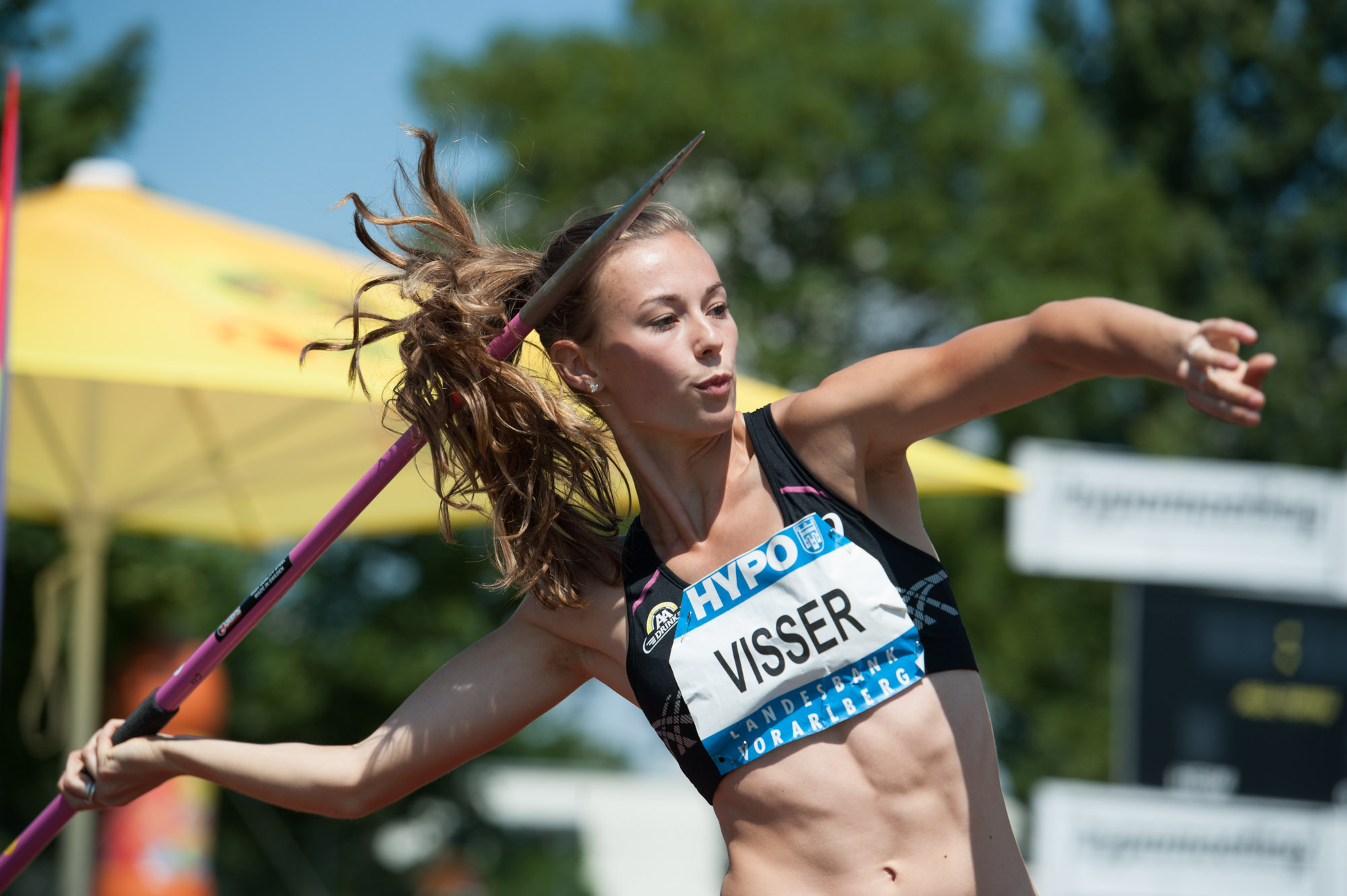
Visser with javelin at the 2014 Hypo-Meeting in Götzis (AT).

During the 2014 indoor season Visser set Dutch indoor junior records in both the 60 m hurdles and the pentathlon; as of 2015, her pentathlon score of 4268 points ranked her ninth on the world all-time junior list. Outdoors, Visser competed in the Götzis Hypo-Meeting for the first time, scoring a personal best 6110 points and placing 14th. At the World Junior Championships in Eugene, Oregon, she took part in both the heptathlon and the 100 m hurdles, winning bronze medals in both events. In the hurdles she broke 13 seconds for the first time, her time of 12.99 s (+1.9) setting a new Dutch junior and under-23 record. Visser qualified for her first senior European Championships that summer, representing the Netherlands in the 100 m hurdles; she ran 13.12 s (-2.0) in the heats and was narrowly eliminated from the semi-finals.

=== 2015 ===
In 2015, Visser became Dutch senior champion for the first time, winning the 60 m hurdles in 8.12 s at the national indoor championships in Apeldoorn; she was selected for the European Indoor Championships in Prague, despite not quite meeting the national federation's qualification standard. In Prague she qualified from the heats on time, but fell in her semi-final and was eliminated. Outdoors, Visser improved her national under-23 hurdles record to 12.97 s (+1.4) at the FBK Games in Hengelo on 24 May; the following week, she placed fifth in the heptathlon at the Hypo-Meeting with a personal best 6467 points. Before the European U23 Championships in Tallinn Visser had reached the qualifying standard in five events (100 m, 200 m, 100 m hurdles, long jump and heptathlon); she chose to compete in the hurdles and the long jump, winning a bronze in the hurdles with a time of 13.01 s (-0.2).

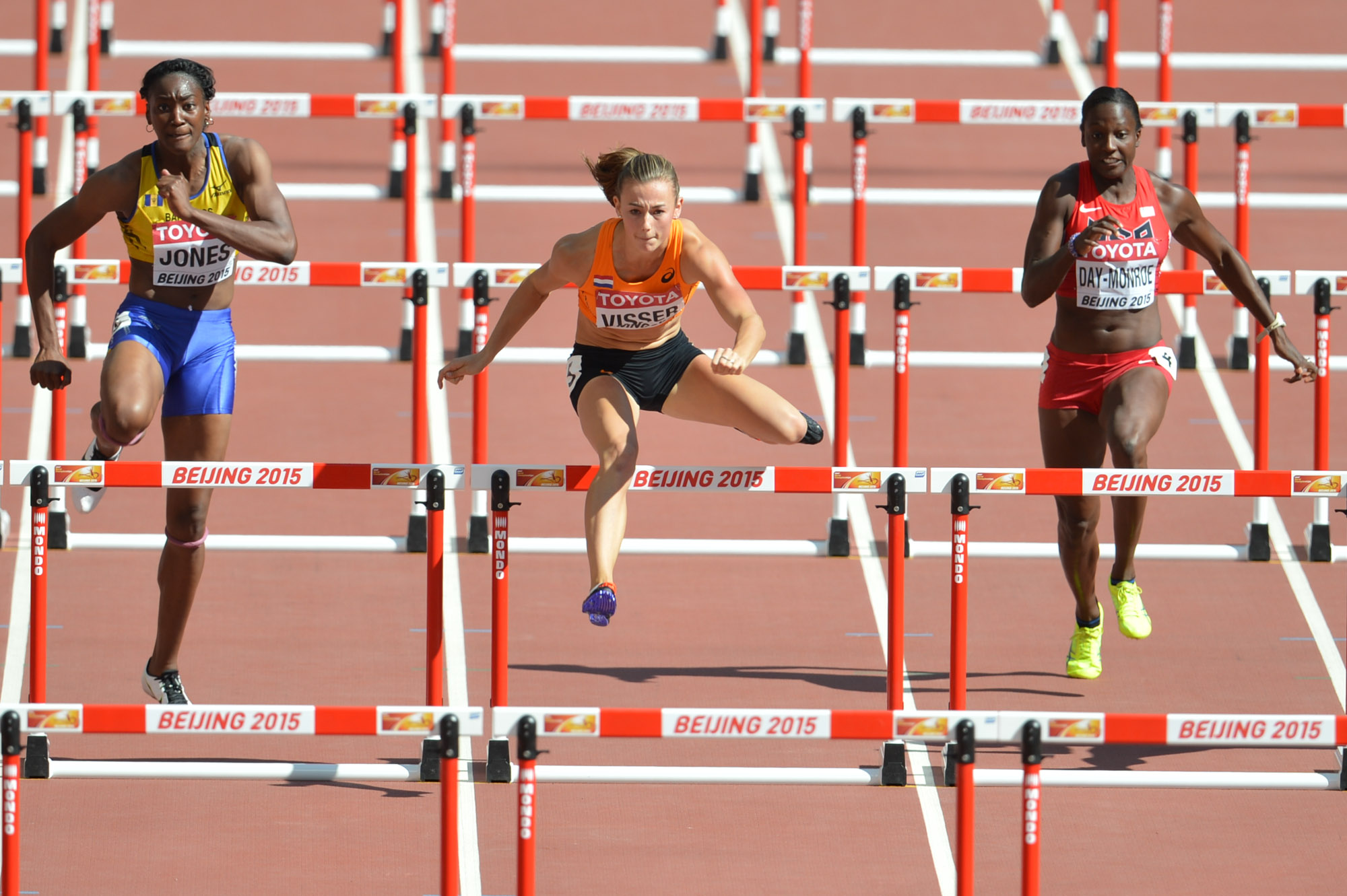
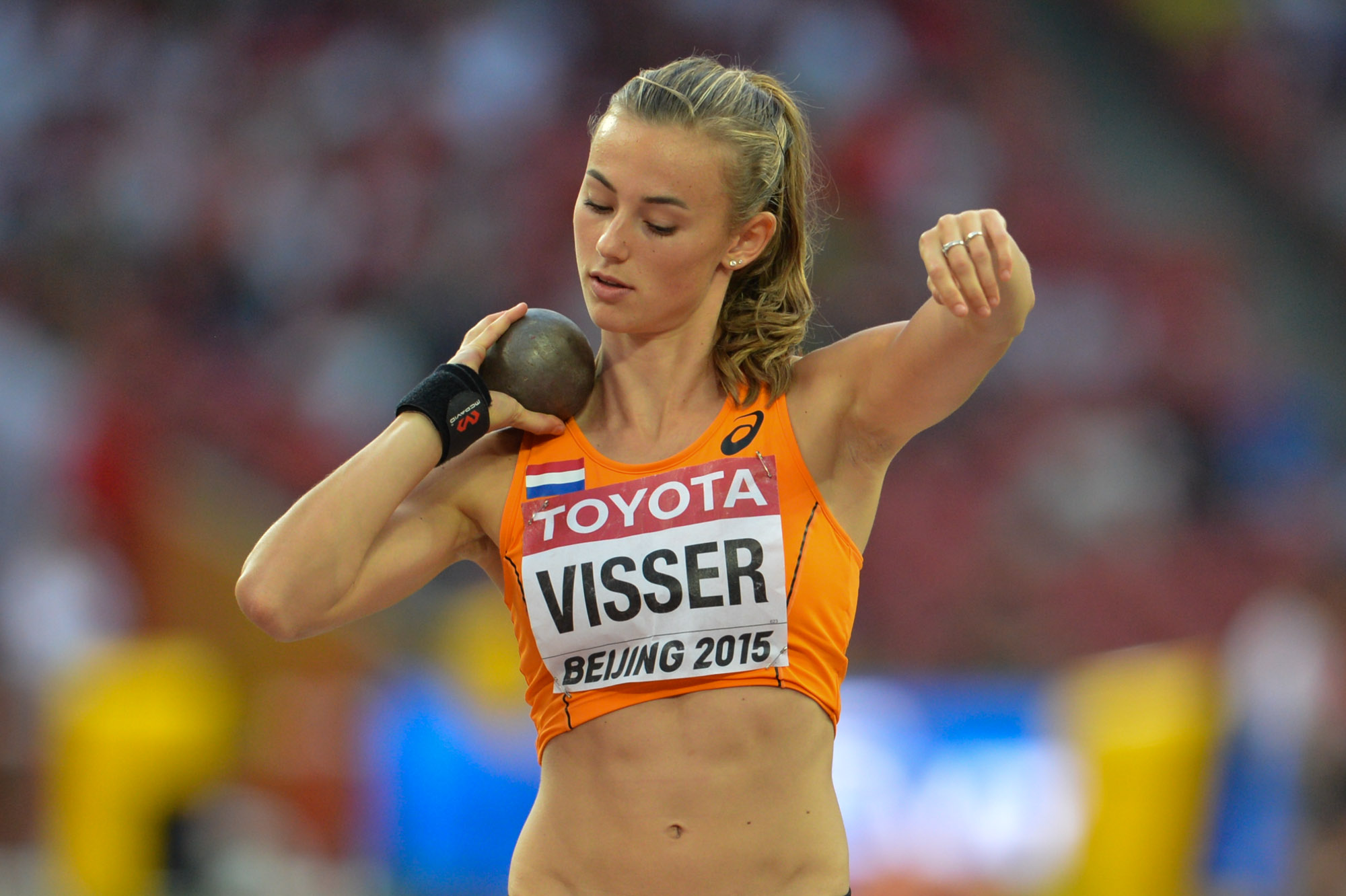
Nadine during the 100 m hurdles and shot put events at the 2015 World Championships in Athletics in Beijing.

At the 2015 European U23 Championships Visser won a bronze in the 100 m hurdles. She went on to compete at the 2015 World Championships in Athletics in Beijing, China, finishing eighth in the heptathlon. She was also the start runner of the Dutch 4 × 100 m relay team with Dafne Schippers, Naomi Sedney and Jamile Samuel that finished fifth in 42.32 s in the final, but was disqualified for a changeover infringement. In the heats the team had run 42.32 s, a new national record. At the end of the summer season she finished third at the Décastar heptathlon in Talence, France.

=== 2016 ===
At the 2016 European Athletics Championships 100 m hurdles in Amsterdam, Visser was eliminated in the semifinals. At the 2016 Summer Olympics heptathlon in Rio de Janeiro, she finished at a disappointing 19th place.

=== 2017 ===
At the 2017 European U23 Championships, she won a gold in the 100 m hurdles. "It was going well until the eighth hurdle and then it became kind of messy. But I am happy to finish first." said Visser. She took a second place in the heptathlon at the Mehrkampf-Meeting in Ratingen (Germany), behind Carolin Schäfer. In August, Visser finished seventh in the event with 6370 points at the World Championships in London. The same month, she won a gold in the 100 m hurdles at the Summer Universiade for university athletes.

=== 2018: Heptathlon or hurdles ===
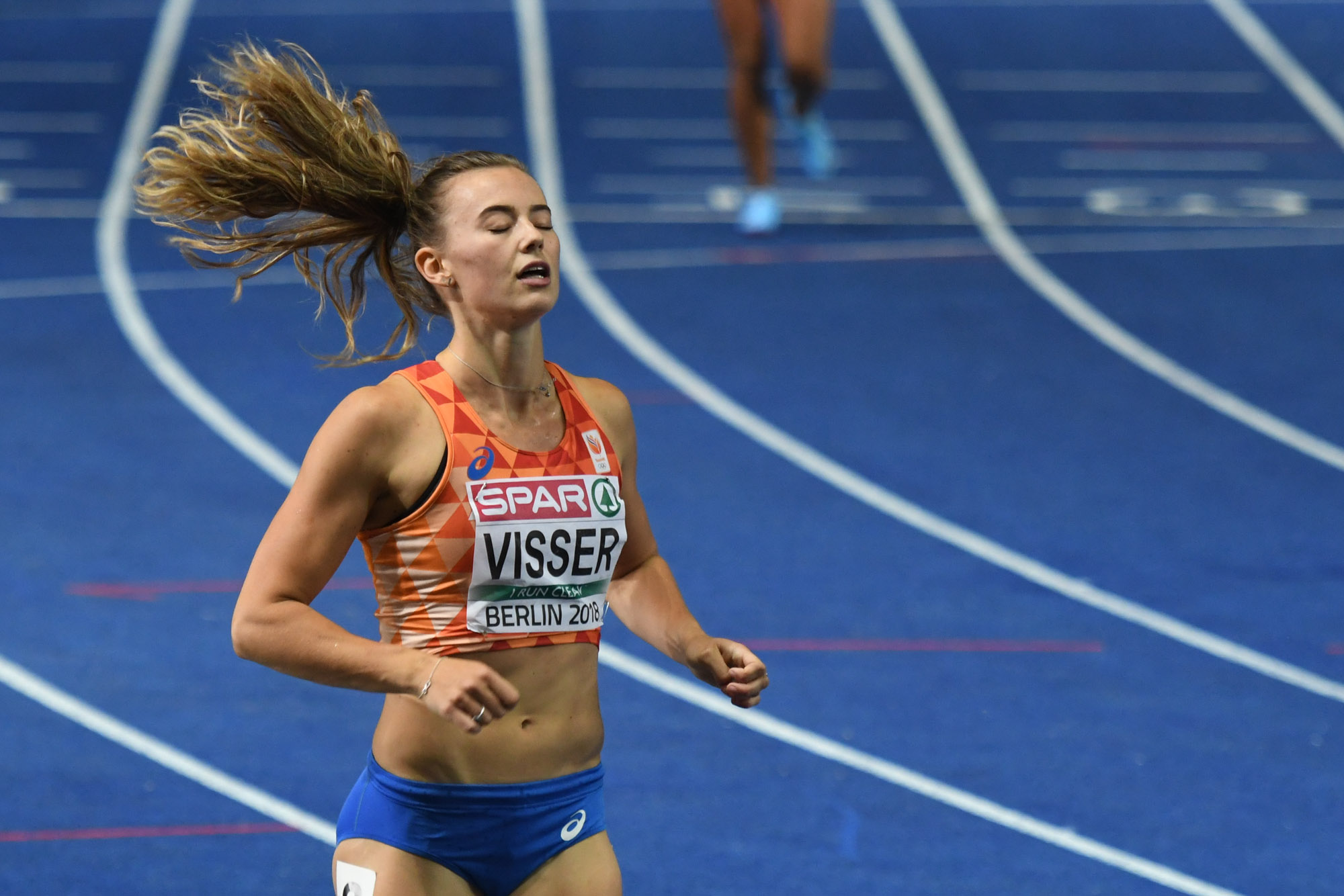
Visser at the 2018 European Championships in Berlin.

The 2018 season started with a bronze at the World Indoor Championship 60 m hurdles. She had clocked 7.83 s to win her semi-final, obliterating Marjan Olyslager’s Dutch record of 7.89 s which had stood since 1989. In consultation with her coach Bart Bennema, Visser had to make a decision about her future: the heptathlon or hurdles. With the 2018 European Championships in Berlin on the doorstep and given her chances of victory on the hurdles at that event, she decided to concentrate on hurdling. In June, at the Diamond League in Stockholm, she ran a new national record in the 100 m hurdles with a time of 12.71 seconds, breaking almost 30-year old record of Olyslager from 1989. She finished fourth at the European Championships in a time of 12.88 s.

=== 2019 ===
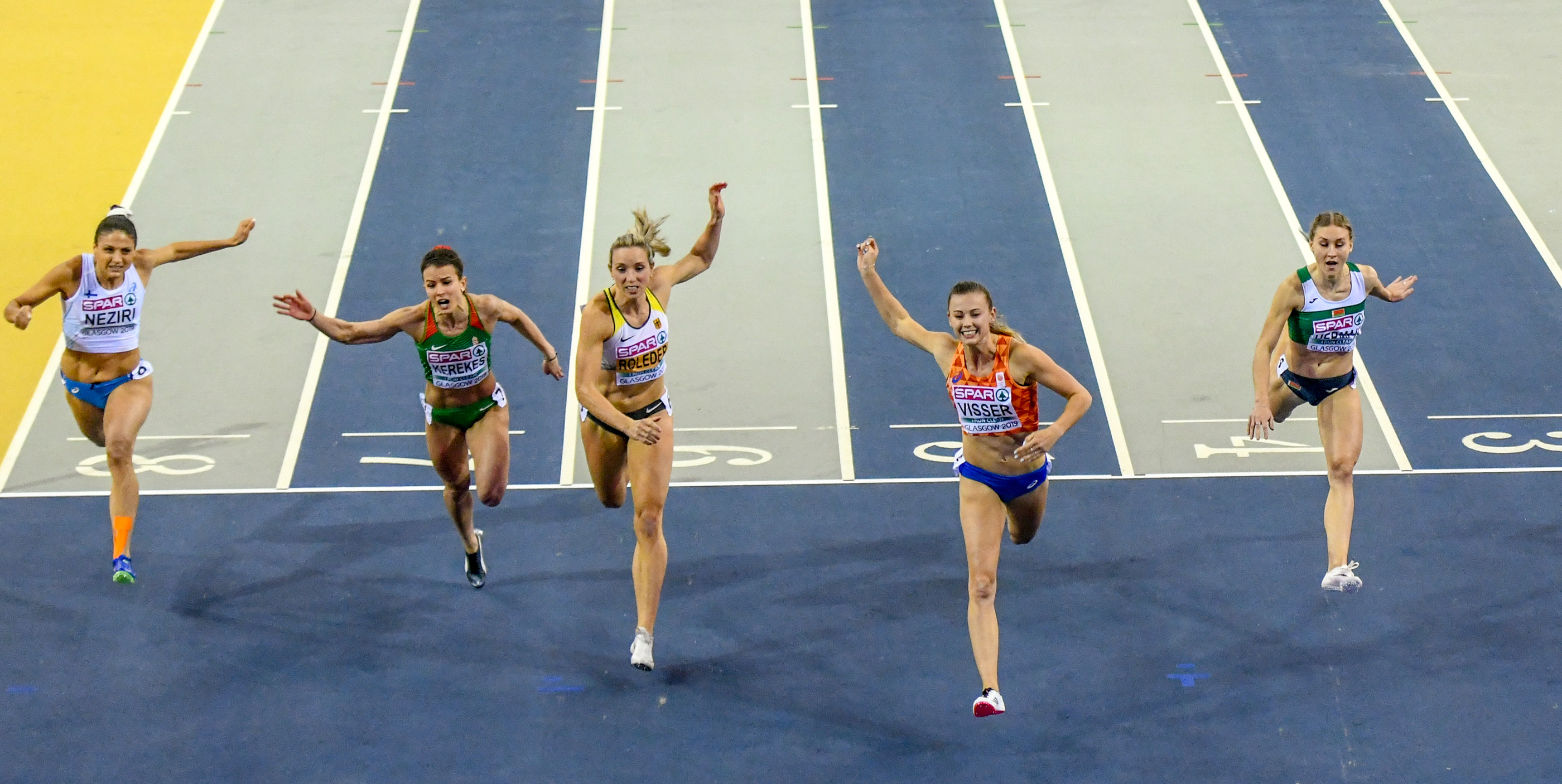
Visser (2nd from the right) won her first European title with the 60 m hurdles victory at indoor Glasgow 2019.

In 2019, she started with winning the 60 m hurdles title at the 2019 European Indoor Championships in Glasgow. At the 2019 World Athletics Championships held in Doha, she finished sixth in the 100 m hurdles final. She had broken her own national record in the semi-finals, clocking 12.62 s (+1.0).

=== 2021 ===
Visser successfully defended her European 60 m hurdles title at Toruń 2021 in Poland, improving her own Dutch record to 7.77 seconds. She finished fifth in the 100 m hurdles at the postponed 2020 Tokyo Olympics with a time of 12.73 s.

=== 2026 ===
On 12 August 2026, Visser won the gold medal in the 100 metres hurdles at the European Championships in Birmingham, England.

== Personal bests ==
Information from her World Athletics profile unless otherwise noted.

=== Individual events ===
Personal best results for individual events
Event	Result	Venue	Date	Record	Notes
60 metres	7.19 s i	Apeldoorn, Netherlands	17 February 2024		
100 metres	11.17 s	Hengelo, Netherlands	2 August 2025		(Wind: +1.0 m/s)
150 metres	16.94 s	Ostrava, Czech Republic	8 September 2020		(Wind: +0.6 m/s)
200 metres	23.38 s	Arnhem, Netherlands	18 July 2020		(Wind: +0.4 m/s)
300 metres	40.36 s	Goes, Netherlands	28 April 2017		
800 metres	2:13.08 min	Talence, France	20 September 2015		
800 metres short track	2:21.90 min i	Apeldoorn, Netherlands	5 February 2017		
50 metres hurdles	6.77+ s	Liévin, France	13 February 2025	NR	
60 metres hurdles	7.72 s i	Apeldoorn, Netherlands	7 March 2025	NR	
100 metres hurdles	12.28 s	Chorzów, Poland	16 August 2025	NR	(Wind: +1.1 m/s)
High jump	1.80 m	Beijing, China	22 August 2015		
Long jump	6.48 m	Götzis, Austria	31 May 2015		(Wind: +1.1 m/s)
Shot put	13.89 m i	Apeldoorn, Netherlands	28 January 2017		
Javelin throw	44.01 m	Götzis, Austria	31 May 2015		
Heptathlon	6467 pts	Götzis, Austria	30–31 May 2015		
Heptathlon	100m H (wind) / High jump / Shot put / 200m (wind) / Long jump (wind) / Javelin / 800m; 13.04 s (-0.2 m/s) / 1.77 m / 13.15 m / 23.62 s (+1.4 m/s) / 6.48 m (+1.1 m/s) / 44.01 m / 2:13.88 min				
Pentathlon short track	4428 pts i	Apeldoorn, Netherlands	5 February 2017		
Pentathlon short track	60m H / High jump / Shot put / Long jump / 800m; 8.01 s i / 1.68 m i / 13.61 m i / 6.18 m i / 2:21.90 min i				

=== Team events ===
Personal best results for team events
Event	Result	Venue	Date	Record	Notes
4 × 100 metres relay	42.02 s	Madrid, Spain	28 June 2025	NR	Teamed with Minke Bisschops, Lieke Klaver, and Marije van Hunenstijn. Visser ran the first leg.

== Competition results ==
=== International competitions ===
Representing the Netherlands
Year	Competition	Venue	Position	Event	Result
2011	European Youth Olympic Festival	Trabzon, Turkey	1st	100 m hurdles	13.28
2011	European Youth Olympic Festival	Trabzon, Turkey	1st	4 × 100 m relay	45.93
2012	World Junior Championships	Barcelona, Spain	11th	Heptathlon	5447 pts
2013	European Junior Championships	Rieti, Italy	4th	Heptathlon	5774 pts
2014	World Junior Championships	Eugene, OR, United States	3rd	100 m hurdles	12.99
2014	World Junior Championships	Eugene, OR, United States	3rd	Heptathlon	5948 pts
2015	European U23 Championships	Tallinn, Estonia	3rd	100 m hurdles	13.01
2015	World Championships	Beijing, China	8th	Heptathlon	6344 pts
2016	Olympic Games	Rio de Janeiro, Brazil	19th	Heptathlon	6190 pts
2017	European U23 Championships	Bydgoszcz, Poland	1st	100 m hurdles	12.92
2017	World Championships	London, United Kingdom	7th	Heptathlon	6370 pts
2017	World Championships	London, United Kingdom	7th	100 m hurdles	12.83
2017	Universiade	Taipei, Taiwan	1st	100 m hurdles	12.98
2018	World Indoor Championships	Birmingham, United Kingdom	3rd	60 m hurdles	7.84
2018	European Championships	Berlin, Germany	4th	100 m hurdles	12.88
2019	European Indoor Championships	Glasgow, Scotland	1st	60 m hurdles	7.87
2019	World Championships	Doha, Qatar	6th	100 m hurdles	12.64
2021	European Indoor Championships	Toruń, Poland	1st	60 m hurdles	7.77
2021	World Relays	Chorzów, Poland	3rd	4 × 100 m relay	44.10
2021	Olympic Games	Tokyo, Japan	5th	100 m hurdles	12.73
2021	Olympic Games	Tokyo, Japan	7th (h)	4 × 100 m relay	42.81^{1}
2022	World Championships	Eugene, OR, United States	12th (sf)	100 m hurdles	12.66
2022	European Championships	Munich, Germany	4th	100 m hurdles	12.75
2023	European Indoor Championships	Istanbul, Turkey	2nd	60 m hurdles	7.84
2023	World Championships	Budapest, Hungary	10th (sf)	100 m hurdles	12.62
2023	World Championships	Budapest, Hungary	–	4 × 100 m relay	DNF
2024	World Indoor Championships	Glasgow, United Kingdom	24th (sf)	60 m hurdles	8.42
2024	European Championships	Rome, Italy	5th	100 m hurdles	12.72
2024	European Championships	Rome, Italy	3rd	4 × 100 m relay	42.46
2024	Olympic Games	Paris, France	4th	100 m hurdles	12.43
2025	European Indoor Championships	Apeldoorn, Netherlands	2nd	60 m hurdles	7.72
2025	World Indoor Championships	Nanjing, China	6th	60 m hurdles	7.76
2025	World Championships	Tokyo, Japan	8th	100 m hurdles	12.56
2026	World Indoor Championships	Toruń, Poland	2nd	60 m hurdles	7.73
2026	European Championships	Birmingham, United Kingdom	1st	100 m hurdles	12.67
2026	World Ultimate Championship	Budapest, Hungary	3rd (Note: At this championship, the top three athletes don't receive medals, only the winner receives a trophy.)	100 m hurdles	12.39

=== National titles ===
- Dutch Athletics Championships
  - 100 metres: 2020
  - 100 m hurdles: 2015, 2020, 2022, 2023, 2026
- Dutch Indoor Athletics Championships
  - 60 metres: 2024
  - 60 m hurdles: 2015, 2016, 2017, 2018, 2019, 2020, 2021, 2025, 2026
  - Pentathlon: 2017

== Notes ==
Achievements
Preceded by Danielle Williams	Women's season's best performance, 100 m hurdles 2020	Succeeded by Jasmine Camacho-Quinn
Preceded by Kendra Harrison	Women's season's best performance, 60 m hurdles 2021	Succeeded by Danielle Williams
