= Morgan Snow =

American hurdler (born 1993)

Morgan Snow-Goodwin
Personal information
- Nationality: American
- Born: July 26, 1993 (age 32) Atlanta, Georgia

Sport
- Sport: Running
- Event(s): 100 metre hurdles, 60 metres hurdles
- College team: Texas Longhorns

Achievements and titles
- Personal best: 100m h: 12.78 (Eugene 2016) 60m h: 8.07 (Fayetteville 2015)
Medal record
Women's athletics
Representing the United States
World Junior Championships
Gold medal – first place	2012 Barcelona	100 m hurdles
Gold medal – first place	2012 Barcelona	4×100 m relay

Morgan Sannette Snow-Goodwin (born July 26, 1993) is an American hurdler who specializes in the 100 metre hurdles. She was a 9-time All-American at the University of Texas at Austin.

A native of Atlanta, Georgia, Snow attended Southwest DeKalb High School. She was the 2011 USA Junior Olympic Champion in the 100m Hurdles and the 2011 AAU Junior Olympic Champion in the same event. She won two gold medals at the 2012 World Junior Championships in Athletics. She won the 2013 Big 12 Outdoor championships in the 100m Hurdles and the 2015 Big 12 Indoor championship in the 60m Hurdles.

After college, she tried out for the 2016 United States Olympic team in the 100 meter hurdles, but finished 14th.

She is married to American football wide receiver and Olympian Marquise Goodwin. On November 12, 2017, her first baby died due to premature childbirth. Her husband honored both of them after scoring an 83-yard touchdown reception that same day. The couple went on to have a daughter, Marae, and a son, Marquise Jr.
