= Anamaria Nesteriuc =

Romanian hurdler (born 1993)

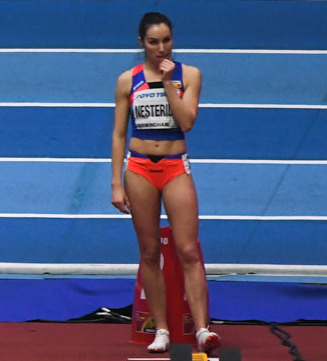
- Anamaria Nesteriuc at the 2018 IAAF World Indoor Championships

Personal information
- Born: 29 November 1993 (age 32) Cluj-Napoca, Romania
- Education: Iuliu Hațieganu University of Medicine and Pharmacy

Sport
- Sport: Athletics
- Event: 100 metres hurdles

Anamaria Nesteriuc (born 29 November 1993) is a Romanian athlete specialising in the sprint hurdles.

Born in Cluj-Napoca, she represented her country at the 2018 World Indoor Championships without reaching the semifinals.

Her personal bests are 13.19 seconds in the 100 metres hurdles (+1.5 m/s, Novi Pazar 2017) and 8.17 seconds in the 60 metres hurdles (Istanbul 2018).

== International competitions ==
Year	Competition	Venue	Position	Event	Notes
Representing Romania
2012	World Junior Championships	Barcelona, Spain	26th (h)	100 m hurdles	14.03
2013	European U23 Championships	Tampere, Finland	12th (h)	100 m hurdles	13.61
2015	European U23 Championships	Tallinn, Estonia	19th (h)	100 m hurdles	13.89
2016	European Championships	Amsterdam, Netherlands	20th (h)	100 m hurdles	13.41
2017	European Indoor Championships	Belgrade, Serbia	17th (h)	60 m hurdles	8.24
2017	Universiade	Taipei, Taiwan	5th	100 m hurdles	13.35
2017	Universiade	Taipei, Taiwan	3rd	4 × 400 m relay	3:34.16
2018	Balkan Indoor Championships	Istanbul, Turkey	1st	60 m hurdles	8.17
2018	World Indoor Championships	Birmingham, United Kingdom	30th (h)	60 m hurdles	8.32
2018	European Championships	Berlin, Germany	22nd (sf)	100 m hurdles	13.26
2021	European Indoor Championships	Toruń, Poland	–	60 m hurdles	DQ
2022	World Indoor Championships	Belgrade, Serbia	18th (sf)	60 m hurdles	8.13
2023	Jeux de la Francophonie	Kinshasa, DR Congo	2nd	100 m hurdles	13.20
2024	European Championships	Rome, Italy	21st (h)	100 m hurdles	14.09
