= Stephanie Bendrat =

Austrian hurdler

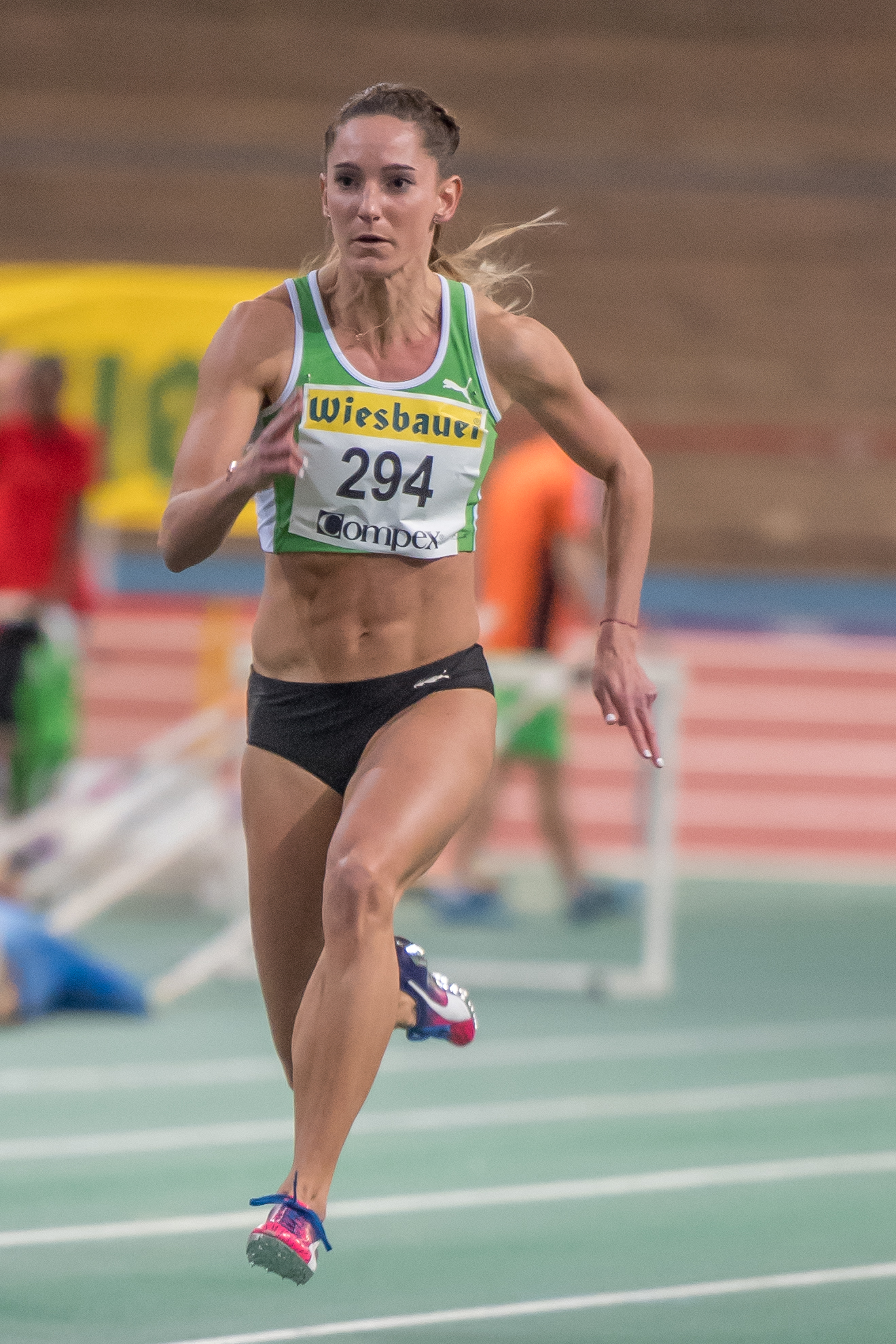

Personal information
- Born: 5 March 1991 (age 34)
- Education: University of Salzburg
- Height: 1.64 m (5 ft 5 in)
- Weight: 52 kg (115 lb)

Sport
- Sport: Athletics
- Event: 100 m hurdles
- Club: Union Salzburg Leichtathletik
- Coached by: Philipp Unfried

Stephanie Bendrat (born 5 March 1991) is an Austrian athlete competing in the sprint hurdles. She represented her country at the 2016 World Indoor Championships without advancing from the first round.

== International competitions ==
Year	Competition	Venue	Position	Event	Notes
Representing Austria
2016	World Indoor Championships	Portland, United States	13th (h)	60 m hurdles	8.25
2016	European Championships	Amsterdam, Netherlands	23rd (sf)	100 m hurdles	14.00
2017	European Indoor Championships	Belgrade, Serbia	34th (h)	60 m	7.55
2017	European Indoor Championships	Belgrade, Serbia	–	60 m hurdles	DQ
2017	Universiade	Taipei, Taiwan	7th	100 m hurdles	13.74
2018	World Indoor Championships	Birmingham, United Kingdom	15th (sf)	60 m hurdles	8.10
2018	European Championships	Berlin, Germany	23rd (sf)	100 m hurdles	13.43
2019	European Indoor Championships	Glasgow, United Kingdom	27th (h)	60 m hurdles	8.42

== Personal bests ==
Outdoor

- 100 metres – 11.69 (+0.9 m/s, Südstadt 2015)
- 200 metres – 24.61 (-0.2 m/s, Amstetten 2016)
- 100 metres hurdles – 13.11 (0.0 m/s, St. Pölten 2016)

Indoor

- 60 metres – 7.41 (Linz 2016)
- 60 metres hurdles – 8.13 (Linz 2015)
