= Lotta Harala =

Finnish hurdler (born 1992)

Lotta Harala OLY
Personal information
- Born: 26 March 1992 (age 34)

Sport
- Country: Finland
- Sport: Athletics
- Events: 100 m hurdles, 60 m hurdles

Achievements and titles
- Personal bests: 60m hurdles: 8.00 (Tampere, 2023); 100m hurdles: 12.65 (La Chaux-de-Fonds, 2024)NR

Lotta Harala OLY (born 26 March 1992) is a Finnish hurdler. In 2017, she became Finnish national champion in the 100m hurdles. She has represented Finland at multiple major championships, including the 2024 Olympic Games.

== Biography ==
She finished fourth in the 100 metres hurdles at the 2009 World Youth Championships in Athletics in Bressanone at the age of 17 years-old.

She competed in the 60m hurdles at the 2017 European Athletics Indoor Championships in Belgrade. She won the Finnish national 100m hurdles title in July 2017.

Harala lowered her personal best to 13.07 seconds for the 100m hurdles in August 2020 in Espoo.

She competed at the 2023 European Athletics Indoor Championships in Istanbul. She lowered her personal best to 12.85 seconds in Switzerland in July 2023. She competed at the 2023 World Athletics Championships in Budapest.

She competed at the 2024 European Athletics Championships in Rome where she reached the semi-finals. She competed in the 100m hurdles at the 2024 Paris Olympics, reaching the semi-finals.

She qualified for the final of the 60 metres hurdles at the 2025 European Athletics Indoor Championships in Apeldoorn, but suffered a bad fall on the first hurdle in the final and did not complete the race. She was a semi-finalist at the 2025 World Athletics Championships in Tokyo, Japan, but was disqualified for a false start.

On 1 March 2026, she won the 60 metres hurdles in 8.00 seconds ahead of Saara Keskitalo at the Finish Indoor Championships in Espoo. In August 2026, she competed at the 2026 European Athletics Championships in Birmingham, England, in the women's 100 metres hurdles, reaching the semi-finals.

== Doping violation ==
In January 2021, Harala was suspended for three months for a doping violation. A sample given on August 5, 2020, in Espoo contained 5-methylhexan-2-amine (1,4-dimethylpentylamine), classified as a stimulant. She claimed the violation was unintentional and that she had ingested a prohibited substance from a creatine dietary supplement whose product description did not mention the substance and may have had a contaminated production line and had temporarily used her boyfriend's creatine when her stocks ran out during the COVID-19 pandemic. Her suspension started in October 2020 and the three-month sentence had been served by January 12, 2021. Her coach Matti Liimatainen departed from her support team after the finding.

== Personal life ==
She is from Tampere. She has spoken about suffering from disordered eating after her teenage breakthrough in athletics. She has discussed receiving personal and abusive messages on social media.

Her relationship with Matias Myttynen, an ice hockey player, has been followed by TV5's reality television series Lätkä Love. Her Fitness Diary 2021 was included in a television program on the Discovery+ streaming service.
