= Awa Sene =

French hurdler and pentathlete (born 1994)

Personal information
- Born: 24 July 1994 (age 31) Sébikhotane, Senegal
- Height: 1.69 m (5 ft 7 in)
- Weight: 57 kg (126 lb)

Sport
- Country: France
- Sport: Track and field
- Event(s): 60 metre hurdles 100 metre hurdles Pentathlon
- Club: Doubs Sud Athletics, Besançon

Awa Sene (born 24 July 1994) is a French hurdler and pentathlete who competes in international elite events. She is a 2018 French champion in the 100 metre hurdles and her highest achievement is reaching fourth at the event in the 2013 European U20 Athletics Championships in Rieti.
