= Olímpia Barbosa =

Portuguese athlete (born 1995)

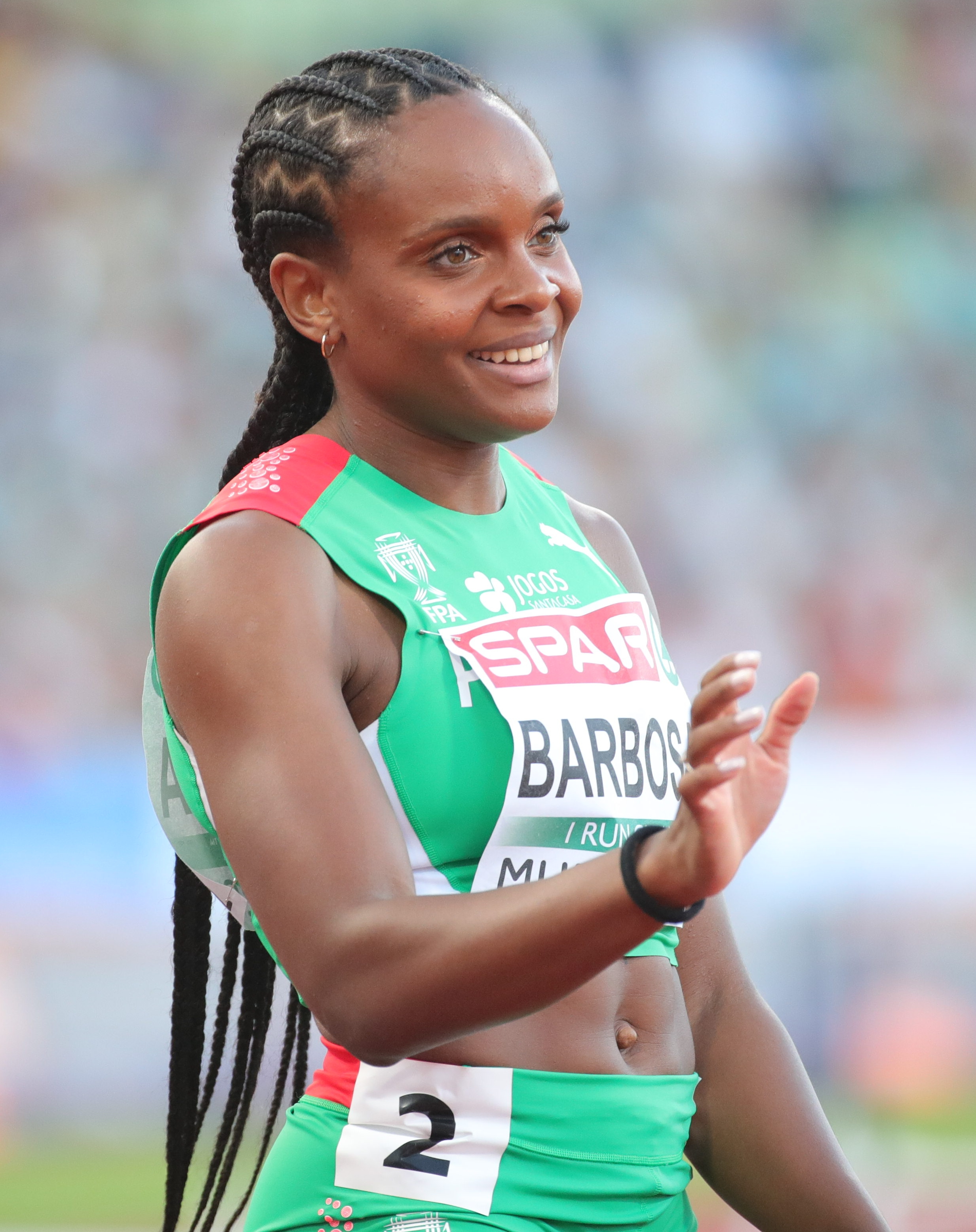
- Barbosa at the 2022 European Athletics Championships in Munich, Germany

Personal information
- Nationality: São Toméan (1995–2014); Portuguese (since 2014)
- Born: 28 February 1995 (age 31) São Tomé, São Tomé and Príncipe

Sport
- Sport: Athletics (100 metres hurdles)
- Club: Sporting CP (since 2012)

Achievements and titles
- Personal bests: 60 mH: 8.16 i (2023); 100 mH: 13.27 (2022)
Medal record
Women's athletics
Representing Portugal
Ibero-American Championships
Silver medal – second place	2022 La Nucia	4 × 100 meters relay

Olímpia Barbosa (born 28 February 1995) is a Portuguese athlete who specialises in 100 metres hurdles. She is an Ibero-American silver medalist, national champion, and national indoor champion. She is a firefighter by profession.

== Early life ==
Olímpia Barbosa was born on 28 February 1995 in São Tomé, the capital of São Tomé and Príncipe. She moved to Portugal with her family when she was two years old.

== Career ==
Barbosa acquired Portuguese nationality in November 2014. At the club level, she was a member of União Atlético Povoense (2010–2011) and Grupo Recreativo Quinta da Lomba (early 2012) before joining Sporting CP in late 2012. As of 2024, she is a nine-time national champion and six-time national indoor champion.

Representing Portugal at the 2022 Ibero-American Championships in Athletics, Barbosa won silver in the 4 × 100 meters relay event, with teammates Lorène Bazolo, Patrícia Rodrigues, and Rosalina Santos.

Outside of sports, Barbosa is a firefighter for the Lisbon Fire Brigade Regiment.

== Personal bests ==
=== Individual events ===
Personal best times for individual events
Event	Time	Location	Date	Notes
60 metres	7.44 i	Lisbon, Portugal	16 January 2021	
100 metres	11.75	Pompal, Portugal	27 June 2015	(Wind: +1.5 m/s)
200 metres	25.28	Fátima, Portugal	7 July 2013	(Wind: +0.9 m/s)
200 metres short track	25.82 i	Pompal, Portugal	22 January 2012	
60 metres hurdles	8.16 i	Pombal, Portugal	19 February 2023	
100 metres hurdles	13.27	Montgeron, France	15 May 2022	(Wind: −1.1 m/s)

=== Team events ===
Personal best times for team events
Event	Time	Location	Date	Notes
4 × 100 metres relay	44.82	La Nucia, Spain	21 May 2022	Teamed with Patrícia Rodrigues, Rosalina Santos, and Lorène Bazolo. Barbosa ran the third leg.
