= Ricarda Lobe =

German athletics competitor

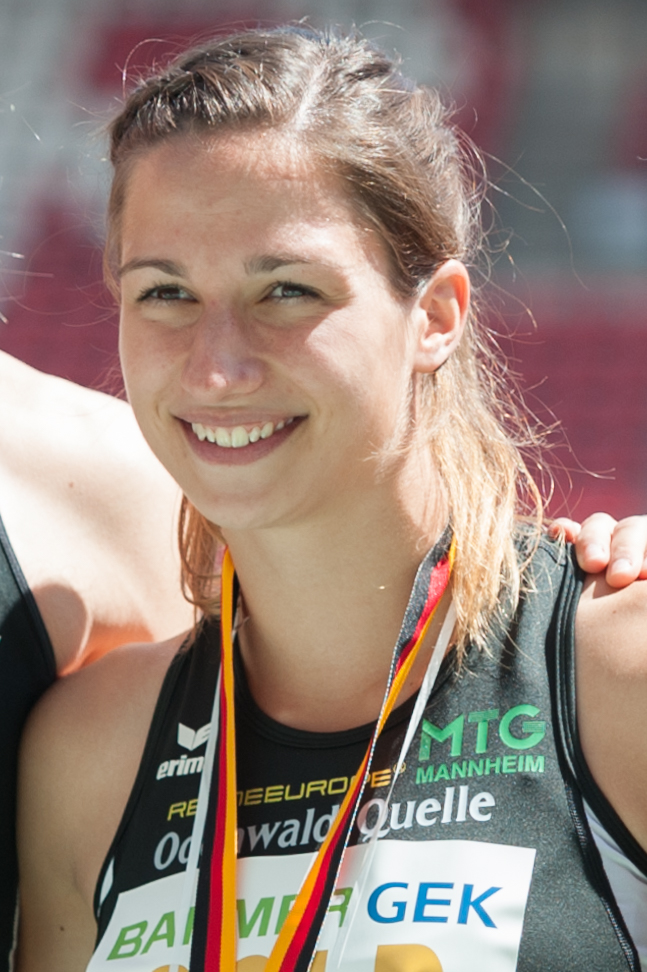
Ricarda Lobe

Ricarda Lobe (born 1994 in Landau in der Pfalz, Germany) is a German 100 m and 60 m hurdler. She also competes in 60 m (indoor), 100 and 200 m and also 4 × 100 m relay. Ricarda Lobe is in the MTG Manneheim team. She competed in 2017 European Athletics Indoor Championships in Belgrade and she was 6th place in finals of 60 m hurdles with 8.03".

Lobe competed in 2017 IAAF World Championships and advanced to the semifinals of the 100 m hurdles. She was also 3rd in German championships in the same year in the same event.

Ricarda Lobe trains with training partners Lisa Mayer and Nadine Gongska.

Her personal best time is 12.91 and 7.99 for 100 m hurdles and 60 m hurdles, respectively.
