= 2016 European Athletics Championships – Women's 100 metres hurdles =

Women's 100 metres hurdles at the European Athletics Championships
- Venue: Olympic Stadium
- Location: Amsterdam
- Dates: 6 July (round 1); 7 July (semifinals & final)
- Competitors: 39 from 21 nations
- Winning time: 12.62 EL

Medalists
gold medal	Cindy Roleder	Germany
silver medal	Alina Talay	Belarus
bronze medal	Tiffany Porter	Great Britain

The women's 100 metres hurdles at the 2016 European Athletics Championships took place at the Olympic Stadium on 6 and 7 July.

== Records ==
Standing records prior to the 2016 European Athletics Championships
World record	Yordanka Donkova (BUL)	12.21	Stara Zagora, Bulgaria	20 August 1988
European record	Yordanka Donkova (BUL)	12.21	Stara Zagora, Bulgaria	20 August 1988
Championship record	Yordanka Donkova (BUL)	12.38	Stuttgart, West Germany	29 August 1986
World Leading	Kendra Harrison (USA)	12.24	Eugene, United States	28 May 2016
European Leading	Alina Talay (BLR)	12.63	Regensburg, Germany	5 June 2016

== Schedule ==
Date	Time	Round
6 July 2016	11:40	Round 1
7 July 2016	17:10	Semifinal
7 July 2016	19:40	Final

All times are local times (UTC+2)

== Results ==
=== Round 1 ===
First 2 in each heat (Q) and the next 5 fastest (q) advance to the Semifinals.

Wind:
Heat 1: +1.3 m/s, Heat 2: +1.8 m/s, Heat 3: +0.1 m/s, Heat 4: +0.6 m/s

Rank	Heat	Lane	Name	Nationality	Time	Note
1	2	2	Elisavet Pesiridou	Greece	12.98	Q
2	4	6	Susanna Kallur	Sweden	13.01	Q
3	4	7	Elvira Herman	Belarus	13.03	Q, PB
4	1	7	Giulia Pennella	Italy	13.04	Q, SB
5	2	6	Karolina Kołeczek	Poland	13.06	Q
6	1	4	Isabelle Pedersen	Norway	13.07	Q, SB
6	3	5	Eefje Boons	Netherlands	13.07	Q, PB
8	3	3	Anne Zagré	Belgium	13.12	Q
9	1	3	Reetta Hurske	Finland	13.16	q, PB
10	1	6	Stephanie Bendrat	Austria	13.17	q
11	4	2	Marina Tomič	Slovenia	13.18	q
12	1	2	Caridad Jerez	Spain	13.21	q
13	1	5	Olena Yanovska	Ukraine	13.23	
13	3	7	Hanna Plotitsyna	Ukraine	13.23	q
15	3	8	Ivana Lončarek	Croatia	13.27	
16	2	8	Luca Kozák	Hungary	13.30	
17	2	5	Micol Cattaneo	Italy	13.34	
18	3	2	Lucy Hatton	Great Britain	13.37	
19	4	4	Serita Solomon	Great Britain	13.39	
20	2	4	Lucie Koudelová	Czech Republic	13.41	
20	3	4	Anamaria Nesteriuc	Romania	13.41	
22	2	3	Eva Wimberger	Austria	13.43	
23	3	6	Lilla Juhász	Hungary	13.51	
23	4	3	Laura Ikauniece-Admidiņa	Latvia	13.51	
25	4	5	Gréta Kerekes	Hungary	13.54	
	2	7	Elin Westerlund	Sweden	DNF	
	4	8	Beate Schrott	Austria	DNS	

=== Semifinals ===
First 2 (Q) and next 2 fastest (q) qualify for the final.

Wind:
Heat 1: +0.1 m/s, Heat 2: -1.1 m/s, Heat 3: -0.5 m/s

Rank	Heat	Lane	Name	Nationality	Time	Note
1	1	4	Alina Talay*	Belarus	12.76	Q
1	1	6	Cindy Roleder*	Germany	12.76	Q, SB
3	1	7	Anne Zagré	Belgium	12.89	q, SB
4	2	6	Clélia Rard-Reuse*	Switzerland	12.90	Q
5	1	3	Cindy Billaud*	France	12.91	q
6	2	8	Elisavet Pesiridou	Greece	12.95	Q
7	2	3	Nadine Hildebrand*	Germany	12.95	
8	1	5	Susanna Kallur	Sweden	12.96	
9	2	4	Sandra Gomis*	France	12.97	
9	3	4	Tiffany Porter*	Great Britain	12.97	Q
11	1	8	Hanna Plotitsyna	Ukraine	13.02	SB
11	3	5	Pamela Dutkiewicz*	Germany	13.02	Q
13	2	5	Katsiaryna Paplauskaya*	Belarus	13.04	
14	3	3	Nooralotta Neziri*	Finland	13.05	
15	3	8	Karolina Kołeczek	Poland	13.09	
16	3	7	Elvira Herman	Belarus	13.18	
17	2	2	Isabelle Pedersen	Norway	13.20	
18	3	6	Nadine Visser*	Netherlands	13.25	
19	1	2	Eefje Boons	Netherlands	13.26	
20	3	2	Marina Tomič	Slovenia	13.32	
21	1	1	Reetta Hurske	Finland	13.40	
22	3	1	Giulia Pennella	Italy	13.55	
23	2	1	Stephanie Bendrat	Austria	14.00	
	2	7	Caridad Jerez	Spain	DQ	R162.7

*Athletes who received a bye to the semifinals

=== Final ===
Wind: -0.7 m/s

Rank	Lane	Name	Nationality	Time	Note
1st place, gold medalist(s)	7	Cindy Roleder	Germany	12.62	EL
2nd place, silver medalist(s)	5	Alina Talay	Belarus	12.68	
3rd place, bronze medalist(s)	4	Tiffany Porter	Great Britain	12.76	
4	6	Clélia Rard-Reuse	Switzerland	12.96	
5	2	Anne Zagré	Belgium	12.97	
6	8	Elisavet Pesiridou	Greece	13.05	
7	3	Cindy Billaud	France	13.29	
	9	Pamela Dutkiewicz	Germany	DNF	
