= 2012 European Athletics Championships – Women's 100 metres hurdles =

Women's 100 metres hurdles at the European Athletics Championships

The women's 100 metres hurdles at the 2012 European Athletics Championships was held at the Helsinki Olympic Stadium on 29 and 30 June.

== Medalists ==
Gold	Alina Talay; Belarus
Silver	Katsiaryna Paplauskaya; Belarus
Bronze	Beate Schrott; Austria

== Records ==
Standing records prior to the 2012 European Athletics Championships
World record	Yordanka Donkova (BUL)	12.21	Stara Zagora, Bulgaria	20 August 1988
European record	Yordanka Donkova (BUL)	12.21	Stara Zagora, Bulgaria	20 August 1988
Championship record	Yordanka Donkova (BUL)	12.38	Stuttgart, West Germany	29 August 1986
World Leading	Sally Pearson (AUS)	12.49	Melbourne, Australia	3 March 2012
World Leading	Sally Pearson (AUS)	12.49	Oslo, Norway	7 June 2012
European Leading	Tiffany Porter (GBR)	12.65	Kingston, Jamaica	5 May 2012

== Schedule ==
Date	Time	Round
29 June 2012	9:30	Round 1
30 June 2012	19:35	Semifinals
30 June 2012	22:35	Final

== Results ==
=== Round 1 ===
First 3 in each heat (Q) and 4 best performers (q) advance to the Semifinals.

Wind:
Heat 1: +0.3 m/s, Heat 2: −0.1 m/s, Heat 3: −0.8 m/s, Heat 4: −0.4 m/s

Rank	Heat	Lane	Name	Nationality	Time	Note
DQ	1	7	Nevin Yanıt	Turkey	~~12.78~~	Q, ~~SB~~, Doping
1	4	5	Alina Talay	Belarus	12.93	Q
2	1	6	Katsiaryna Paplauskaya	Belarus	12.97	Q
3	2	3	Beate Schrott	Austria	12.98	Q, SB
4	3	2	Marzia Caravelli	Italy	13.03	Q
5	1	1	Micol Cattaneo	Italy	13.07	Q, =SB
6	3	5	Eline Berings	Belgium	13.09	Q
7	3	3	Aisseta Diawara	France	13.10	Q
8	2	6	Yuliya Kondakova	Russia	13.11	Q
8	1	2	Olga Samylova	Russia	13.11	q
10	4	7	Cindy Roleder	Germany	13.12	Q
11	2	7	Alice Decaux	France	13.13	Q
12	2	4	Anne Zagré	Belgium	13.14	q
13	1	5	Nadine Hildebrand	Germany	13.15	q
14	4	4	Lucie Škrobáková	Czech Republic	13.17	Q
14	2	2	Christina Vukicevic	Norway	13.17	q, SB
16	2	5	Nooralotta Neziri	Finland	13.23	NUR
17	4	3	Clélia Reuse	Switzerland	13.25	SB
18	1	4	Elisa Leinonen	Finland	13.29	PB
19	3	6	Marina Tomić	Slovenia	13.36	
20	4	6	Isabelle Pedersen	Norway	13.38	SB
21	3	1	Victoria Schreibeis	Austria	13.39	
22	4	2	Giulia Pennella	Italy	13.43	
23	2	1	Viorica Țigău	Romania	13.59	
23	3	7	Sharona Bakker	Netherlands	13.59	
25	4	1	Sandra Gomis	France	13.63	
26	1	3	Mónica Lopes	Portugal	13.83	
27	3	4	Gorana Cvijetić	Bosnia and Herzegovina	14.41	

=== Semifinals ===
First 3 in each heat (Q) and 2 best performers (q) advance to the Final.

Wind:
Heat 1: -2.3 m/s, Heat 2: +0.6 m/s

Rank	Heat	Lane	Name	Nationality	Time	Note
DQ	2	3	Nevin Yanıt	Turkey	~~12.92~~	Q, Doping
1	1	3	Alina Talay	Belarus	13.03	Q
1	2	6	Katsiaryna Paplauskaya	Belarus	13.03	Q
3	1	4	Beate Schrott	Austria	13.08	Q
3	2	1	Anne Zagré	Belgium	13.08	Q
5	1	7	Micol Cattaneo	Italy	13.10	Q
6	2	4	Cindy Roleder	Germany	13.13	q
7	2	5	Marzia Caravelli	Italy	13.15	q
8	1	6	Eline Berings	Belgium	13.17	
8	2	7	Lucie Škrobáková	Czech Republic	13.17	
10	1	1	Christina Vukicevic	Norway	13.23	
11	2	2	Olga Samylova	Russia	13.24	
12	1	5	Yuliya Kondakova	Russia	13.32	
13	2	8	Alice Decaux	France	13.35	
14	1	2	Nadine Hildebrand	Germany	13.52	
—N/a	1	8	Aisseta Diawara	France	DSQ	

=== Final ===
Wind: -1.4 m/s

Rank	Lane	Name	Nationality	Time	Note
DQ	5	Nevin Yanıt	Turkey	~~12.81~~	Doping
1st place, gold medalist(s)	3	Alina Talay	Belarus	12.91	
2nd place, silver medalist(s)	6	Katsiaryna Paplauskaya	Belarus	12.97	
3rd place, bronze medalist(s)	4	Beate Schrott	Austria	12.98	=SB
4	8	Anne Zagré	Belgium	13.02	
5	1	Marzia Caravelli	Italy	13.11	
6	2	Cindy Roleder	Germany	13.11	
7	7	Micol Cattaneo	Italy	13.16	
