= 2013 European Athletics Indoor Championships – Women's 60 metres hurdles =

Women's athletic competition

The women's 60 metres hurdles event at the 2013 European Athletics Indoor Championships was held on 1 March 2013 at 11:30 (round 1), 18:20 (semi-final) and 19:55 (final) local time.

== Records ==
Standing records prior to the 2013 European Athletics Indoor Championships
World record	Susanna Kallur (SWE)	7.68	Karlsruhe, Germany	10 February 2008
European record	Susanna Kallur (SWE)	7.68	Karlsruhe, Germany	10 February 2008
Championship record	Lyudmila Narozhilenko (URS)	7.74	Glasgow, United Kingdom	4 March 1990
World Leading	Brianna Rollins (USA)	7.78	Clemson, South Carolina, United States	11 January 2013
European Leading	Yuliya Kondakova (RUS)	7.93	Moscow, Russia	3 February 2013

== Results ==
=== Round 1 ===
Qualification: First 4 (Q) or and the 4 fastest athletes (q) advanced to the final.

Rank	Heat	Athlete	Nationality	Time	Note
1	1	Nevin Yanıt	Turkey	8.01	Q
2	3	Alina Talay	Belarus	8.02	Q
3	1	Derval O'Rourke	Ireland	8.05	Q, SB
3	3	Veronica Borsi	Italy	8.05	Q
5	2	Yuliya Kondakova	Russia	8.07	Q
6	2	Lucie Škrobáková	Czech Republic	8.07	Q
7	2	Sara Aerts	Belgium	8.07	Q
8	1	Eline Berings	Belgium	8.08	Q
9	1	Marzia Caravelli	Italy	8.09	Q
9	2	Micol Cattaneo	Italy	8.09	Q, =SB
11	3	Svetlana Topilina	Russia	8.10	Q
12	3	Sharona Bakker	Netherlands	8.11	Q
13	2	Nadine Hildebrand	Germany	8.12	q
14	2	Nooralotta Neziri	Finland	8.13	q
15	3	Isabelle Pedersen	Norway	8.18	q, PB
16	2	Hanna Platitsyna	Ukraine	8.20	q
16	1	Eva Vital	Portugal	8.20	PB
18	3	Noemi Zbären	Switzerland	8.21	PB
19	2	Ivana Lončarek	Croatia	8.22	PB
19	3	Reïna-Flor Okori	France	8.22	
21	1	Elisa Leinonen	Finland	8.23	
21	4	Lotta Harala	Finland	8.23	
23	1	Marina Tomić	Slovenia	8.34	
	1	Alice Decaux	France	DQ	

=== Semi-final ===
Qualification: First 4 (Q) advanced to the final.

Rank	Heat	Athlete	Nationality	Time	Note
1	2	Nevin Yanıt	Turkey	7.94	Q, NR
2	2	Veronica Borsi	Italy	7.96	Q, NR
3	2	Eline Berings	Belgium	7.98	Q
4	1	Yuliya Kondakova	Russia	8.00	Q
4	2	Derval O'Rourke	Ireland	8.00	Q, SB
6	1	Alina Talay	Belarus	8.02	Q
7	2	Sharona Bakker	Netherlands	8.05	SB
8	1	Micol Cattaneo	Italy	8.08	Q, SB
9	1	Nooralotta Neziri	Finland	8.09	Q
10	1	Lucie Škrobáková	Czech Republic	8.09	
11	2	Nadine Hildebrand	Germany	8.11	
12	2	Svetlana Topilina	Russia	8.11	
13	1	Marzia Caravelli	Italy	8.12	
14	1	Sara Aerts	Belgium	8.14	
15	2	Hanna Platitsyna	Ukraine	8.16	PB
16	1	Isabelle Pedersen	Norway	8.22	

=== Final ===
The final was held at 19:55.

Rank	Lane	Athlete	Nationality	Time	Note
	3	Nevin Yanit	Turkey	7.89	DQ
1st place, gold medalist(s)	5	Alina Talay	Belarus	7.94	=PB
2nd place, silver medalist(s)	4	Veronica Borsi	Italy	7.94	NR
3rd place, bronze medalist(s)	2	Derval O'Rourke	Ireland	7.95	SB
4	6	Yuliya Kondakova	Russia	7.99	
5	8	Eline Berings	Belgium	8.08	
6	7	Micol Cattaneo	Italy	8.11	
7	1	Nooralotta Neziri	Finland	8.19	
