= 2014 European Athletics Championships – Women's 100 metres hurdles =

Women's 100 metres hurdles at the European Athletics Championships

The women's 100 metres hurdles at the 2014 European Athletics Championships have taken place at the Letzigrund on 12 and 13 August.

== Medalists ==
Gold	Tiffany Porter; Great Britain
Silver	Cindy Billaud; France
Bronze	Cindy Roleder; Germany

== Records ==
Standing records prior to the 2014 European Athletics Championships
World record	Yordanka Donkova (BUL)	12.21	Stara Zagora, Bulgaria	20 August 1988
European record	Yordanka Donkova (BUL)	12.21	Stara Zagora, Bulgaria	20 August 1988
Championship record	Yordanka Donkova (BUL)	12.38	Stuttgart, West Germany	29 August 1986
World Leading	Dawn Harper Nelson (USA)	12.44	Paris, France	5 July 2014
European Leading	Cindy Billaud (FRA)	12.56	Reims, France	12 July 2014

== Schedule ==
Date	Time	Round
12 August 2014	13:30	Round 1
12 August 2014	20:56	Semifinal
13 August 2014	21:34	Final

All times are local times (UTC+2)

== Results ==
=== Round 1 ===
First 3 in each heat (Q) and 4 best performers (q) advance to the Semifinals.

Wind:
Heat 1: −1.5 m/s, Heat 2: −1.1 m/s, Heat 3: 0.0 m/s, Heat 4: −2.0 m/s

Rank	Heat	Lane	Name	Nationality	Time	Note
1	4	8	Tiffany Porter	Great Britain	12.69	Q, SB
2	1	5	Cindy Billaud	France	12.75	Q
3	3	6	Nadine Hildebrand	Germany	12.78	Q, PB
4	3	5	Sharona Bakker	Netherlands	12.85	Q, PB
5	2	7	Anne Zagré	Belgium	12.86	Q
6	2	1	Cindy Roleder	Germany	12.91	Q
7	4	3	Noemi Zbären	Switzerland	12.95	Q
8	3	1	Yuliya Kondakova	Russia	12.97	Q
9	2	6	Marzia Caravelli	Italy	12.98	Q, SB
10	2	5	Rosina Hodde	Netherlands	12.99	q
11	4	6	Eline Berings	Belgium	13.00	Q
12	3	3	Lisa Urech	Switzerland	13.05	q
13	2	2	Svetlana Topylina	Russia	13.06	q
14	2	3	Karolina Kołeczek	Poland	13.12	q
14	3	4	Marina Tomič	Slovenia	13.12	q
14	4	5	Nadine Visser	Netherlands	13.12	
17	4	7	Nooralotta Neziri	Finland	13.17	
17	4	1	Isabelle Pedersen	Norway	13.17	
17	1	8	Alina Talay	Belarus	13.17	Q
20	1	7	Franziska Hofmann	Germany	13.21	Q
21	1	6	Caridad Jerez	Spain	13.23	
22	1	3	Yekaterina Galitskaya	Russia	13.24	
23	2	4	Ivana Loncarek	Croatia	13.25	
24	3	7	Ida Aidanpää	Finland	13.26	
25	4	4	Elisávet Pesirídou	Greece	13.27	PB
26	1	4	Lucie Škrobáková	Czech Republic	13.29	
27	4	2	Beate Schrott	Austria	13.31	
28	3	8	Sonata Tamošaityte	Lithuania	13.34	
29	2	8	Sarah Lavin	Ireland	13.35	
30	1	2	Matilda Bogdanoff	Finland	13.39	
	3	2	Lucie Koudelová	Czech Republic	DNF	

=== Semifinals ===
First 3 in each heat (Q) and 2 best performers (q) advance to the Final.

Wind:
Heat 1: −0.8 m/s, Heat 2: −0.1 m/s

Rank	Heat	Lane	Name	Nationality	Time	Note
1	2	4	Tiffany Porter	Great Britain	12.73	Q
2	1	7	Cindy Billaud	France	12.79	Q
3	2	5	Anne Zagré	Belgium	12.83	Q, =SB
4	1	4	Cindy Roleder	Germany	12.84	Q
5	1	3	Rosina Hodde	Netherlands	12.91	Q, PB
6	1	6	Nadine Hildebrand	Germany	12.92	q
7	2	7	Alina Talay	Belarus	12.94	Q, SB
8	1	8	Eline Berings	Belgium	12.95	q
9	1	5	Noemi Zbären	Switzerland	13.01	
10	2	6	Sharona Bakker	Netherlands	13.02	
11	1	9	Marzia Caravelli	Italy	13.06	
12	2	3	Lisa Urech	Switzerland	13.10	
13	2	9	Yuliya Kondakova	Russia	13.11	
14	2	8	Franziska Hofmann	Germany	13.14	
15	2	2	Karolina Kołeczek	Poland	13.20	
16	1	2	Svetlana Topylina	Russia	13.27	
17	1	1	Marina Tomič	Slovenia	13.32	

=== Final ===
Wind: −0.7 m/s

Rank	Lane	Name	Nationality	Time	Note
1st place, gold medalist(s)	5	Tiffany Porter	Great Britain	12.76	
2nd place, silver medalist(s)	4	Cindy Billaud	France	12.79	
3rd place, bronze medalist(s)	6	Cindy Roleder	Germany	12.82	
4	3	Anne Zagré	Belgium	12.89	
5	8	Alina Talay	Belarus	12.97	
6	2	Nadine Hildebrand	Germany	13.01	
7	7	Rosina Hodde	Netherlands	13.08	
8	1	Eline Berings	Belgium	13.24	
