= 2012 IAAF World Indoor Championships – Women's 60 metres hurdles =

The women's 60 metres hurdles event at the 2012 IAAF World Indoor Championships was held at the Ataköy Athletics Arena on 9 and 10 March 2012.

The winning margin was 0.21 seconds which as of July 2024 remains the only time the women's 60 metres hurdles was won by more than 0.2 seconds at these championships.

== Medalists ==
| Gold | Silver | Bronze |
|---|---|---|
| Sally Pearson; Australia | Tiffany Porter; United Kingdom | Alina Talay; Belarus |

== Records ==
Standing records prior to the 2012 IAAF World Indoor Championships
| World record | Susanna Kallur (SWE) | 7.68 | Karlsruhe, Germany | 10 February 2008 |
| Championship record | Lolo Jones (USA) | 7.72 | Doha, Qatar | 13 March 2010 |
| World Leading | Kristi Castlin (USA) | 7.83 | Albuquerque, United States | 26 February 2012 |
| African record | Glory Alozie (NGR) | 7.82 | Madrid, Spain | 16 February 1999 |
| Asian record | Olga Shishigina (KAZ) | 7.82 | Liévin, France | 21 February 1999 |
| European record | Susanna Kallur (SWE) | 7.68 | Karlsruhe, Germany | 10 February 2008 |
| North and Central American and Caribbean record | Lolo Jones (USA) | 7.72 | Doha, Qatar | 13 March 2010 |
| Oceanian Record | Sally McLellan (AUS) | 7.96 | New York City, United States | 30 January 2009 |
| South American record | Maíla Machado (BRA) | 8.08 | Moscow, Russia | 11 March 2006 |

== Qualification standards ==
| Indoor | Outdoor |
|---|---|
| 8.18 | 12.95 (100 mH) |

== Schedule ==
| Date | Time | Round |
|---|---|---|
| March 9, 2012 | 17:00 | Heats |
| March 10, 2012 | 17:10 | Semifinals |
| March 10, 2012 | 19:45 | Final |

== Results ==
=== Heats ===
Qualification: First 3 of each heat (Q) and 4 fastest times qualified (q)

| Rank | Heat | Name | Nationality | Time | Notes |
|---|---|---|---|---|---|
| 1 | 1 | Sally Pearson | Australia | 7.85 | Q, AR |
| 2 | 3 | Tiffany Porter | Great Britain | 8.00 | Q |
| 3 | 1 | Eline Berings | Belgium | 8.08 | Q |
| 4 | 2 | Alina Talay | Belarus | 8.11 | Q |
| 5 | 4 | Marzia Caravelli | Italy | 8.13 | Q |
| 6 | 1 | Nikkita Holder | Canada | 8.15 | Q |
| 7 | 4 | Beate Schrott | Austria | 8.16 | Q |
| 8 | 3 | Sharona Bakker | Netherlands | 8.19 | Q |
| 8 | 1 | Derval O'Rourke | Ireland | 8.19 | q |
| 10 | 3 | Veronica Borsi | Italy | 8.20 | Q |
| 11 | 3 | Svetlana Topilina | Russia | 8.20 | q |
| 12 | 3 | Lucie Škrobáková | Czech Republic | 8.20 | q |
| 13 | 3 | Seun Adigun | Nigeria | 8.21 | q |
| 14 | 4 | Sonata Tamošaitytė | Lithuania | 8.27 | Q |
| 15 | 4 | Vanneisha Ivy | United States | 8.28 | |
| 16 | 1 | Aleesha Barber | Trinidad and Tobago | 8.35 | |
| 17 | 1 | Cindy Roleder | Germany | 8.35 | |
| 18 | 2 | Angela Moroșanu | Romania | 8.37 | Q |
| 19 | 2 | Ekaterina Galitskaya | Russia | 8.40 | Q |
| 20 | 4 | Lee Yeon-Kyung | South Korea | 8.41 | NR |
| 21 | 4 | Sun Yawei | China | 8.46 | |
| DQ | 2 | Demetra Arachovití | Cyprus | ~~8.49~~ | Doping |
| 22 | 2 | Natalya Ivoninskaya | Kazakhstan | 8.49 | |
| 23 | 4 | Marina Tomić | Slovenia | 8.67 | |
| 24 | 1 | Rosa Rakotozafy | Madagascar | 8.74 | |
| 25 | 3 | Gorana Cvijetić | Bosnia and Herzegovina | 8.89 | |
| 26 | 4 | Dipna Lim Prasad | Singapore | 9.00 | NR |
| 27 | 3 | Ghfran Almouhamad | Syria | 9.15 | PB |
| —N/a | 2 | Kristi Castlin | United States | DNF | |
| —N/a | 2 | Vonette Dixon | Jamaica | DNF | |
| —N/a | 1 | Natasha Ruddock | Jamaica | DNS | |

=== Semifinals ===
Qualification: First 4 of each heat (Q) qualified

| Rank | Heat | Name | Nationality | Time | Notes |
|---|---|---|---|---|---|
| 1 | 1 | Sally Pearson | Australia | 7.93 | Q |
| 2 | 2 | Alina Talay | Belarus | 7.99 | Q, SB |
| 3 | 1 | Eline Berings | Belgium | 8.03 | Q, SB |
| 3 | 2 | Tiffany Porter | Great Britain | 8.03 | Q |
| 3 | 2 | Sonata Tamošaitytė | Lithuania | 8.03 | Q, NR |
| 6 | 1 | Nikkita Holder | Canada | 8.07 | Q |
| 7 | 1 | Seun Adigun | Nigeria | 8.07 | Q, PB |
| 8 | 2 | Beate Schrott | Austria | 8.11 | Q |
| 9 | 1 | Marzia Caravelli | Italy | 8.12 | |
| 10 | 1 | Derval O'Rourke | Ireland | 8.13 | SB |
| 11 | 2 | Lucie Škrobáková | Czech Republic | 8.18 | |
| 12 | 2 | Sharona Bakker | Netherlands | 8.18 | |
| 13 | 2 | Veronica Borsi | Italy | 8.18 | PB |
| 14 | 1 | Angela Moroșanu | Romania | 8.24 | |
| 15 | 1 | Ekaterina Galitskaya | Russia | 8.26 | |
| 16 | 2 | Svetlana Topilina | Russia | 8.32 | |

=== Final ===
The final began at 19:45.

| Rank | Name | Nationality | Time | Notes |
|---|---|---|---|---|
| 1st place, gold medalist(s) | Sally Pearson | Australia | 7.73 | WL, AR |
| 2nd place, silver medalist(s) | Tiffany Porter | Great Britain | 7.94 | |
| 3rd place, bronze medalist(s) | Alina Talay | Belarus | 7.97 | SB |
| 4 | Sonata Tamošaitytė | Lithuania | 8.03 | NR |
| 5 | Eline Berings | Belgium | 8.08 | |
| 6 | Nikkita Holder | Canada | 8.09 | |
| 7 | Beate Schrott | Austria | 8.12 | |
| 8 | Seun Adigun | Nigeria | 8.33 | |
