= 2011 European Athletics U23 Championships – Women's 100 metres hurdles =

The Women's 100 metres hurdles event at the 2011 European Athletics U23 Championships was held in Ostrava, Czech Republic, at Městský stadion on 16 July.

== Medalists ==
Gold	Alina Talay; Belarus
Silver	Lisa Urech; Switzerland
Bronze	Cindy Roleder; Germany

== Results ==
=== Final ===
16 July 2011 / 18:35
Wind: -1.0 m/s

Rank	Name	Nationality	Lane	Reaction Time	Time	Notes
1st place, gold medalist(s)	Alina Talay	Belarus	4	0.190	12.91	SB
2nd place, silver medalist(s)	Lisa Urech	Switzerland	5	0.154	13.00	
3rd place, bronze medalist(s)	Cindy Roleder	Germany	3	0.153	13.10	
4	Aïsseta Diawara	France	7	0.149	13.26	
5	Nina Argunova	Russia	6	0.170	13.26	
6	Olena Yanovska	Ukraine	1	0.177	13.49	
7	Yariatou Touré	France	2	0.179	13.62	
	Anne Zagré	Belgium	8	0.178	DNF	

=== Heats ===
Qualified: First 2 in each heat (Q) and 2 best performers (q) advance to the Final

==== Summary ====
Rank	Name	Nationality	Time	Notes
1	Lisa Urech	Switzerland	13.01	Q
2	Cindy Roleder	Germany	13.05	Q
2	Alina Talay	Belarus	13.05	Q
4	Nina Argunova	Russia	13.16	Q
5	Aïsseta Diawara	France	13.22	Q SB
6	Anne Zagré	Belgium	13.26	Q
7	Yariatou Touré	France	13.38	q
8	Olena Yanovska	Ukraine	13.46	q
9	Giulia Pennella	Italy	13.54	
10	Laura Ahola	Finland	13.72	PB
11	Mairead Murphy	Ireland	13.79	
12	Caridad Jerez	Spain	13.81	
13	Ivana Lončarek	Croatia	13.81	
14	Sharona Bakker	Netherlands	13.88	
15	Tale Ørving	Norway	13.89	
16	Emma Tuvesson	Sweden	13.90	
17	Eleni Nicolaou	Cyprus	14.55	

==== Details ====
===== Heat 1 =====
16 July 2011 / 17:05 Wind: -0.8 m/s

Rank	Name	Nationality	Lane	Reaction Time	Time	Notes
1	Cindy Roleder	Germany	3	0.160	13.05	Q
2	Nina Argunova	Russia	4	0.177	13.16	Q
3	Olena Yanovska	Ukraine	5	0.199	13.46	q
4	Laura Ahola	Finland	2	0.177	13.72	PB
5	Sharona Bakker	Netherlands	6	0.158	13.88	
6	Tale Ørving	Norway	7	0.197	13.89	

===== Heat 2 =====
16 July 2011 / 17:11 Wind: -0.2 m/s

Rank	Name	Nationality	Lane	Reaction Time	Time	Notes
1	Lisa Urech	Switzerland	3	0.168	13.01	Q
2	Aïsseta Diawara	France	4	0.173	13.22	Q SB
3	Giulia Pennella	Italy	5	0.177	13.54	
4	Caridad Jerez	Spain	2	0.166	13.81	
5	Ivana Lončarek	Croatia	6	0.132	13.81	

===== Heat 3 =====
16 July 2011 / 17:17 Wind: -0.6 m/s

Rank	Name	Nationality	Lane	Reaction Time	Time	Notes
1	Alina Talay	Belarus	3	0.214	13.05	Q
2	Anne Zagré	Belgium	4	0.176	13.26	Q
3	Yariatou Touré	France	5	0.164	13.38	q
4	Mairead Murphy	Ireland	2	0.210	13.79	
5	Emma Tuvesson	Sweden	6	0.188	13.90	
6	Eleni Nicolaou	Cyprus	7	0.201	14.55	

== Participation ==
According to an unofficial count, 17 athletes from 16 countries participated in the event.

- Belgium (1)
- Belarus (1)
- Croatia (1)
- Cyprus (1)
- Finland (1)
- France (2)
- Germany (1)
- Ireland (1)
- Italy (1)
- Netherlands (1)
- Norway (1)
- Russia (1)
- Spain (1)
- Sweden (1)
- Switzerland (1)
- Ukraine (1)
