= 2013 World Championships in Athletics – Women's 100 metres hurdles =

Women's 100 metres hurdles at the 2013 World Championships
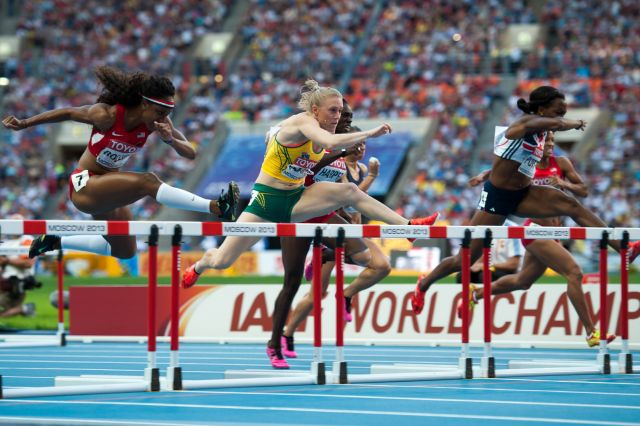
- The final underway.
- Venue: Luzhniki Stadium
- Dates: 16 August (heats); 17 August (semifinals &final)
- Competitors: 36 from 26 nations
- Winning time: 12.44

Medalists
gold medal	Brianna Rollins; United States
silver medal	Sally Pearson; Australia
bronze medal	Tiffany Porter; Great Britain & N.I.

The women's 100 metres hurdles at the 2013 World Championships in Athletics was held at the Luzhniki Stadium on 12–15 August.

In the heats and semis it was the same two names, now lined up next to each other. Brianna Rollins has set the event on fire all season long, winning the NCAA Championships in the fastest time in the last 20 years and Sally Pearson the defending champion and Olympic champion, who had that same honor before Rollins. In the final it was Pearson out first, but Rollins did what she has done all year, run faster than everybody else. Pearson equalled her season best from the semis in second, Tiffany Porter put in a personal best 12.55 to push Dawn Harper off the medal stand only the second time at a major since the 2008 Olympics.

== Records ==
Prior to the competition, the records were as follows:

World record	Yordanka Donkova (BUL)	12.21	Stara Zagora, Bulgaria	20 August 1988
Championship record	Sally Pearson (AUS)	12.28	Daegu, South Korea	3 September 2011
World Leading	Brianna Rollins (USA)	12.26	Des Moines, US	22 June 2013
African Record	Glory Alozie (NGR)	12.44	Monaco	8 August 1998
African Record	Glory Alozie (NGR)	12.44	Brussels, Belgium	28 August 1998
African Record	Glory Alozie (NGR)	12.44	Seville, Spain	28 August 1999
Asian Record	Olga Shishigina (KAZ)	12.44	Luzern, Switzerland	27 June 1995
North, Central American and Caribbean record	Brianna Rollins (USA)	12.26	Des Moines, USA	22 June 2013
South American record	Maurren Higa Maggi (BRA)	12.71	Manaus, Brazil	19 May 2001
European Record	Yordanka Donkova (BUL)	12.21	Stara Zagora, Bulgaria	20 August 1988
Oceanian record	Sally Pearson (AUS)	12.28	Daegu, South Korea	3 September 2011

== Qualification standards ==
A time	B time
12.94	13.10

== Schedule ==
Date	Time	Round
16 August 2013	9:45	Heats
17 August 2013	18:20	Semifinals
17 August 2013	19:50	Final

All times are local times (UTC+4)

== Results ==
KEY:	Q	Qualified	q	Fastest non-qualifiers	NR	National record	PB	Personal best	SB	Seasonal best

=== Heats ===
Qualification: First 4 in each heat (Q) and the next 4 fastest (q) advanced to the semifinals.

Wind: Heat 1: −0.5 m/s, Heat 2: −0.5 m/s, Heat 3: −0.5 m/s, Heat 4: −0.4 m/s, Heat 5: −0.8 m/s.

Rank	Heat	Lane	Name	Nationality	Time	Notes
1	5	5	Brianna Rollins	United States	12.55	Q
2	2	7	Sally Pearson	Australia	12.62	Q, SB
3	2	6	Cindy Billaud	France	12.71	Q
4	4	2	Tiffany Porter	Great Britain & N.I.	12.72	Q
5	4	7	Yuliya Kondakova	Russia	12.76	Q, PB
6	4	4	Dawn Harper	United States	12.84	Q
7	1	6	Angela Whyte	Canada	12.93	Q
8	2	3	Anne Zagré	Belgium	12.94	Q
9	3	4	Queen Harrison	United States	12.95	Q
10	3	8	Alina Talay	Belarus	12.99	Q
11	4	8	Reïna-Flor Okori	France	13.01	Q
12	2	5	Tatyana Dektyareva	Russia	13.04	Q
13	5	4	LaVonne Idlette	Dominican Republic	13.06	Q
14	1	7	Marzia Caravelli	Italy	13.07	Q
15	5	7	Shermaine Williams	Jamaica	13.09	Q
16	3	3	Danielle Williams	Jamaica	13.11	Q
17	3	6	Jessica Zelinka	Canada	13.15	Q
18	1	3	Nadine Hildebrand	Germany	13.16	Q
19	4	9	Lina Flórez	Colombia	13.16	q
20	1	5	Nia Ali	United States	13.19	Q
21	2	8	Brigitte Merlano	Colombia	13.20	q
22	2	9	Andrea Bliss	Jamaica	13.20	q
23	2	2	Nooralotta Neziri	Finland	13.23	q
24	1	2	Lucie Škrobáková	Czech Republic	13.24	
25	3	2	Marina Tomić	Slovenia	13.26	
26	1	4	Wu Shuijiao	China	13.29	
27	3	7	Anna Plotitsyna	Ukraine	13.30	
28	5	2	Aleesha Barber	Trinidad and Tobago	13.33	Q
29	5	3	Veronica Borsi	Italy	13.35	
30	5	8	Isabelle Pedersen	Norway	13.43	
31	4	6	Kierre Beckles	Barbados	13.47	
32	3	5	Noemi Zbären	Switzerland	13.59	
33	2	4	Gnima Faye	Senegal	13.66	
34	1	8	Hitomi Shimura	Japan	13.72	
35	4	5	Anastassiya Soprunova	Kazakhstan	13.85	
36	4	3	Salma Emam Abou El-Hassan	Egypt	14.38	SB
	5	6	Sara Aerts	Belgium	DNS	

=== Semifinals ===
Qualification: First 2 in each heat (Q) and the next 2 fastest (q) advanced to the final.

Wind: Heat 1: −0.6 m/s, Heat 2: +0.2 m/s, Heat 3: -0.7 m/s.

Rank	Heat	Lane	Name	Nationality	Time	Notes
1	3	5	Sally Pearson	Australia	12.50	Q
2	2	4	Brianna Rollins	United States	12.54	Q
3	3	4	Dawn Harper	United States	12.61	Q
4	1	4	Tiffany Porter	Great Britain & N.I.	12.63	Q
5	3	6	Queen Harrison	United States	12.71	q
6	2	5	Yuliya Kondakova	Russia	12.73	Q, PB
7	1	6	Angela Whyte	Canada	12.76	Q
8	2	7	Cindy Billaud	France	12.78	q
9	3	7	Alina Talay	Belarus	12.82	
10	1	2	Nia Ali	United States	12.83	
11	1	7	LaVonne Idlette	Dominican Republic	12.91	
12	3	8	Tatyana Dektyareva	Russia	12.91	SB
13	1	3	Andrea Bliss	Jamaica	12.92	
14	2	8	Shermaine Williams	Jamaica	12.93	SB
15	2	2	Lina Flórez	Colombia	13.01	
16	1	8	Nadine Hildebrand	Germany	13.04	
17	2	3	Nooralotta Neziri	Finland	13.04	NR
18	1	5	Marzia Caravelli	Italy	13.06	
19	2	9	Jessica Zelinka	Canada	13.12	
20	3	9	Danielle Williams	Jamaica	13.13	
21	1	9	Reïna-Flor Okori	France	13.15	
22	3	2	Brigitte Merlano	Colombia	13.22	
23	3	3	Aleesha Barber	Trinidad and Tobago	13.52	
	2	6	Anne Zagré	Belgium	DQ	168.7(b)

=== Final ===
The final was started at 19:50.

Wind: −0.6 m/s.

Rank	Lane	Name	Nationality	Time	Notes
1st place, gold medalist(s)	7	Brianna Rollins	United States	12.44	
2nd place, silver medalist(s)	6	Sally Pearson	Australia	12.50	SB
3rd place, bronze medalist(s)	4	Tiffany Porter	Great Britain & N.I.	12.55	PB
4	5	Dawn Harper	United States	12.59	
5	2	Queen Harrison	United States	12.73	
6	9	Angela Whyte	Canada	12.78	
7	3	Cindy Billaud	France	12.84	
8	8	Yuliya Kondakova	Russia	~~12.86~~	DSQ (doping)
