= 2017 World Championships in Athletics – Women's 100 metres hurdles =

Women's 100 metres hurdles at the 2017 World Championships
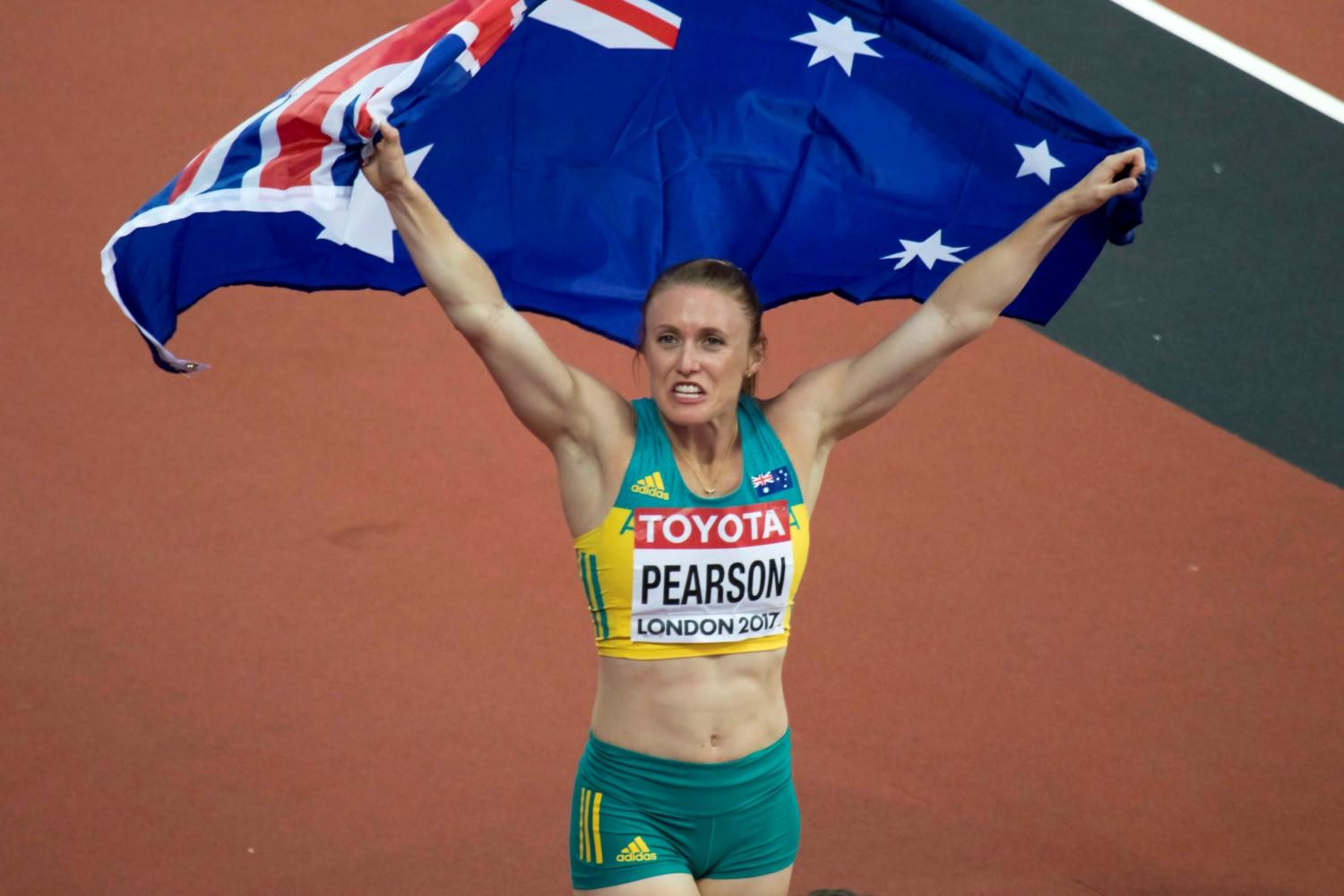
- Sally Pearson shortly after the final.
- Venue: Olympic Stadium
- Dates: 11 August (heats & semifinal); 12 August (final)
- Competitors: 40 from 22 nations
- Winning time: 12.59

Medalists
gold medal	Sally Pearson	Australia
silver medal	Dawn Harper-Nelson	United States
bronze medal	Pamela Dutkiewicz	Germany

The women's 100 metres hurdles at the 2017 World Championships in Athletics was held at the London Olympic Stadium on 11−12 August.

== Summary ==
World record holder Kendra Harrison (USA) was the slowest time qualifier to the final, while 2011 champion Sally Pearson (AUS), Dawn Harper-Nelson (USA) and Pamela Dutkiewicz (GER) were the top three fastest. It was Harper-Nelson's fifth straight championship and fourth final.

In the final, Harrison was out slightly faster than Pearson, Christina Manning (USA) and heptathlete Nadine Visser over the first hurdle. Harrison held the lead until she rattled the third hurdle, where Pearson and Manning advanced, about even over the fourth hurdle, with a wall of Harrison, Dutkiewicz, Visser, Harper-Nelson and Alina Talay (BLR) mere inches behind. But Pearson was gaining a little ground at every hurdle as Harper-Nelson edged forward ahead of Manning. By the tenth barrier, Pearson had almost a metre lead, Harper Nelson another half metre on Manning, with Dutkiewicz and Harrison still just inches behind. On the run in to the finish, Harper-Nelson gained on Pearson, but not enough to grab gold, while Dutkiewicz got past Harrison and Manning, all leaning for a photo finish.

== Records ==
Before the competition records were as follows:

Record	Perf.	Athlete	Nat.	Date	Location
World	12.20	Kendra Harrison	USA	22 Jul 2016	London, Great Britain
Championship	12.28	Sally Pearson	AUS	3 Sep 2011	Daegu, South Korea
World leading	12.28	Kendra Harrison	USA	4 Jul 2017	Székesfehérvár, Hungary
African	12.44	Glory Alozie	NGR	8 Aug 1998	Fontvieille, Monaco
African	12.44	Glory Alozie	NGR	28 Aug 1998	Brussels, Belgium
African	12.44	Glory Alozie	NGR	28 Aug 1999	Seville, Spain
Asian	12.44	Olga Shishigina	KAZ	27 Jun 1995	Luzern, Switzerland
NACAC	12.20	Kendra Harrison	USA	22 Jul 2016	London, Great Britain
South American	12.71	Maurren Maggi	BRA	19 May 2001	Manaus, Brazil
European	12.21	Yordanka Donkova	BUL	20 Aug 1988	Stara Zagora, Bulgaria
Oceanian	12.28	Sally Pearson	AUS	3 Sep 2011	Daegu, South Korea

No records were set at the competition.

== Qualification standard ==
The standard to qualify automatically for entry was 12.98.

== Schedule ==
The event schedule, in local time (UTC+1), was as follows:

Date	Time	Round
11 August	10:45	Heats
11 August	19:05	Semifinals
12 August	20:05	Final

== Results ==
=== Heats ===
The first round took place on 11 August in five heats as follows:

Heat	1	2	3	4	5
Start time	10:44	10:52	11:00	11:08	11:16
Wind (m/s)	−1.4	−0.9	−0.6	−0.6	−0.6
Photo finish	link	link	link	link	link

The first four in each heat ( Q ) and the next four fastest ( q ) qualified for the semifinals. The overall results were as follows:

Rank	Heat	Lane	Name	Nationality	Time	Notes
1	3	2	Kendra Harrison	United States	12.60	Q
2	1	5	Danielle Williams	Jamaica	12.66	Q
3	4	6	Sally Pearson	Australia	12.72	Q
4	1	6	Pamela Dutkiewicz	Germany	12.74	Q
5	2	6	Megan Simmonds	Jamaica	12.78	Q
6	5	9	Christina Manning	United States	12.87	Q
7	4	3	Dawn Harper-Nelson	United States	12.88	Q
8	3	8	Alina Talay	Belarus	12.88	Q, SB
9	3	3	Yanique Thompson	Jamaica	12.88	Q
10	2	7	Nia Ali	United States	12.93	Q
11	1	2	Isabelle Pedersen	Norway	12.94	Q
12	4	2	Rushelle Burton	Jamaica	12.94	Q
13	5	6	Nadine Visser	Netherlands	12.96	Q
14	5	8	Oluwatobiloba Amusan	Nigeria	12.97	Q
15	1	3	Anne Zagré	Belgium	12.97	Q
16	2	8	Phylicia George	Canada	13.01	Q
17	5	3	Elvira Herman	Belarus	13.01	Q
18	4	9	Hanna Plotitsyna	Ukraine	13.01	Q
19	3	9	Devynne Charlton	Bahamas	13.02	Q
20	3	5	Lindsay Lindley	Nigeria	13.07	q
21	4	4	Ricarda Lobe	Germany	13.08	q
22	3	4	Michelle Jenneke	Australia	13.11	q
23	1	7	Sharona Bakker	Netherlands	13.12	q
24	5	5	Nadine Hildebrand	Germany	13.14	
25	3	6	Elisavet Pesiridou	Greece	13.14	
26	1	9	Gréta Kerekes	Hungary	13.15	
27	2	5	Ayako Kimura	Japan	13.15	Q
28	2	9	Luca Kozák	Hungary	13.17	
29	2	4	Tiffany Porter	Great Britain & N.I.	13.18	
30	5	2	Angela Whyte	Canada	13.23	
31	4	5	Hitomi Shimura	Japan	13.29	
32	2	3	Eefje Boons	Netherlands	13.34	
33	4	8	Eline Berings	Belgium	13.35	
34	5	7	Jung Hye-lim	South Korea	13.37	
35	4	7	Marthe Koala	Burkina Faso	13.38	
36	1	8	Fabiana Moraes	Brazil	13.40	
37	1	4	Alicia Barrett	Great Britain & N.I.	13.42	
38	2	2	Mulern Jean	Haiti	13.63	
39	3	7	Lina Ahmed	Egypt	13.78	SB
	5	4	Deborah John	Trinidad and Tobago	DNF	

=== Semifinals ===
The semifinals took place on 11 August in three heats as follows:

Heat	1	2	3
Start time	19:05	19:14	19:23
Wind (m/s)	+0.5	+0.5	+0.2
Photo finish	link	link	link

The first two in each heat ( Q ) and the next two fastest ( q ) qualified for the final. The overall results were as follows:

Rank	Heat	Lane	Name	Nationality	Time	Notes
1	1	6	Sally Pearson	Australia	12.53	Q
2	3	7	Dawn Harper-Nelson	United States	12.63	Q, SB
3	3	4	Pamela Dutkiewicz	Germany	12.71	Q
4	2	5	Christina Manning	United States	12.71	Q
5	1	4	Nia Ali	United States	12.79	Q
6	1	7	Nadine Visser	Netherlands	12.83	q
7	2	6	Alina Talay	Belarus	12.85	Q, SB
8	3	6	Kendra Harrison	United States	12.86	q
9	3	5	Isabelle Pedersen	Norway	12.87	
10	2	7	Yanique Thompson	Jamaica	12.88	
11	1	5	Megan Simmonds	Jamaica	12.93	
12	3	9	Rushelle Burton	Jamaica	12.94	
13	3	2	Devynne Charlton	Bahamas	12.95	
14	2	9	Oluwatobiloba Amusan	Nigeria	13.04	
15	1	8	Phylicia George	Canada	13.04	
16	3	8	Hanna Plotitsyna	Ukraine	13.08	
17	1	3	Ricarda Lobe	Germany	13.11	
18	2	4	Danielle Williams	Jamaica	13.14	
19	2	8	Elvira Herman	Belarus	13.16	
20	1	2	Lindsay Lindley	Nigeria	13.18	
21	2	3	Michelle Jenneke	Australia	13.25	
22	3	3	Sharona Bakker	Netherlands	13.29	
23	2	2	Ayako Kimura	Japan	13.29	
24	1	9	Anne Zagré	Belgium	13.34	

=== Final ===
The final took place on 12 August at 20:05. The wind was +0.1 metres per second and the results were as follows (photo finish):

Rank	Lane	Name	Nationality	Time	Notes
1st place, gold medalist(s)	4	Sally Pearson	Australia	12.59	
2nd place, silver medalist(s)	6	Dawn Harper-Nelson	United States	12.63	SB
3rd place, bronze medalist(s)	5	Pamela Dutkiewicz	Germany	12.72	
4	3	Kendra Harrison	United States	12.74	
5	7	Christina Manning	United States	12.74	
6	8	Alina Talay	Belarus	12.81	SB
7	2	Nadine Visser	Netherlands	12.83	
8	9	Nia Ali	United States	13.04	
