= 2017 European Athletics Indoor Championships – Women's 60 metres hurdles =

The women's 60 metres hurdles event at the 2017 European Athletics Indoor Championships was held on 3 March 2017 at 12:45 (heats), at 16:30 (semifinals) and 19:55 (final) local time.

== Medalists ==
Gold	Silver	Bronze
Cindy Roleder; Germany	Alina Talay; Belarus	Pamela Dutkiewicz; Germany

== Records ==
Standing records prior to the 2017 European Athletics Indoor Championships
World record	Susanna Kallur (SWE)	7.68	Karlsruhe, Germany	10 February 2008
European record	Susanna Kallur (SWE)	7.68	Karlsruhe, Germany	10 February 2008
Championship record	Lyudmila Narozhilenko (URS)	7.74	Glasgow, United Kingdom	4 March 1990
World Leading	Kendra Harrison (USA)	7.75	Lexington, United States	12 January 2017
European Leading	Pamela Dutkiewicz (GER)	7.79	Leipzig, Germany	18 February 2017

== Results ==
=== Heats ===
Qualification: First 3 in each heat (Q) and the next 4 fastest (q) advance to the Semifinal.

Rank	Heat	Athlete	Nationality	Time	Note
1	2	Pamela Dutkiewicz	Germany	7.86	Q
2	2	Nadine Visser	Netherlands	7.92	Q, PB
3	4	Alina Talay	Belarus	7.94	Q
4	3	Cindy Roleder	Germany	7.98	Q
5	1	Isabelle Pedersen	Norway	8.00	Q
5	4	Hanna Plotitsyna	Ukraine	8.00	Q
7	1	Ricarda Lobe	Germany	8.07	Q
8	4	Elisávet Pesirídou	Greece	8.08	Q
9	4	Ivana Lončarek	Croatia	8.12	q
10	3	Sharona Bakker	Netherlands	8.13	Q
11	1	Luca Kozák	Hungary	8.14	Q, PB
12	3	Susanna Kallur	Sweden	8.15	Q
13	1	Maja Rogemyr	Sweden	8.18	q, PB
14	4	Lotta Harala	Finland	8.20	q
15	2	Elvira Herman	Belarus	8.24	Q
16	3	Gréta Kerekes	Hungary	8.24	q, SB
17	4	Anamaria Nesteriuc	Romania	8.24	
18	3	Caridad Jerez	Spain	8.26	
19	1	Karolina Kołeczek	Poland	8.28	
20	3	Olena Yanovska	Ukraine	8.33	
21	3	Stanislava Lajčáková	Slovakia	8.36	
22	4	Milica Emini	Serbia	8.62	
	2	Stephanie Bendrat	Austria	DQ	R162.7
	2	Anne Zagré	Belgium	DQ	R162.7
	2	Reetta Hurske	Finland	DQ	R162.7
	2	Elin Westerlund	Sweden	DQ	R162.7
	1	Andrea Ivančević	Croatia	DNS	

=== Semifinals ===
Qualification: First 4 in each heat (Q) advance to the Final.

Rank	Heat	Athlete	Nationality	Time	Note
1	1	Alina Talay	Belarus	7.86	Q, SB
2	2	Cindy Roleder	Germany	7.89	Q
3	1	Hanna Plotitsyna	Ukraine	7.92	Q, PB
3	2	Pamela Dutkiewicz	Germany	7.92	Q
5	2	Nadine Visser	Netherlands	7.96	Q
6	1	Ricarda Lobe	Germany	8.00	Q
7	2	Isabelle Pedersen	Norway	8.02	Q
8	2	Elisávet Pesirídou	Greece	8.10	
9	1	Susanna Kallur	Sweden	8.12	Q
10	1	Sharona Bakker	Netherlands	8.20	
10	1	Ivana Lončarek	Croatia	8.20	
12	2	Gréta Kerekes	Hungary	8.23	SB
13	1	Luca Kozák	Hungary	8.27	
14	1	Lotta Harala	Finland	8.30	
15	2	Maja Rogemyr	Sweden	8.34	
16	2	Elvira Herman	Belarus	8.57	

=== Final ===
Rank	Lane	Athlete	Nationality	Time	Note
1st place, gold medalist(s)	6	Cindy Roleder	Germany	7.88	
2nd place, silver medalist(s)	5	Alina Talay	Belarus	7.92	
3rd place, bronze medalist(s)	3	Pamela Dutkiewicz	Germany	7.95	
4	4	Hanna Plotitsyna	Ukraine	7.96	
5	1	Isabelle Pedersen	Norway	8.01	
6	8	Ricarda Lobe	Germany	8.03	
7	7	Nadine Visser	Netherlands	8.04	
8	2	Susanna Kallur	Sweden	8.14	
