= Sharona Bakker =

Dutch hurdler

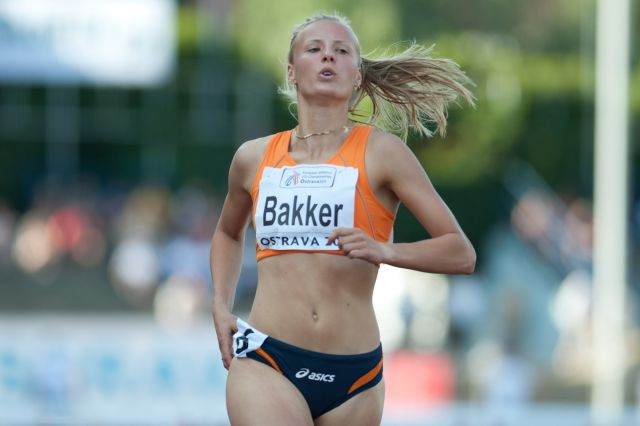
- Sharona Bakker in 2011

Personal information
- Born: 12 April 1990 (age 35) IJmuiden, Netherlands
- Height: 1.70 m (5 ft 7 in)
- Weight: 62 kg (137 lb)

Sport
- Sport: Athletics
- Event(s): 100 m hurdles, 60 m hurdles
- Club: AV Lycurgus
- Coached by: Piet Bogaard; Purcy Marte; Robin Korving; Rana Reider

Sharona Bakker (Dutch: [ɕaːˈroːnaː ˈbɑkər]; born 12 April 1990) is a Dutch athlete specialising in the sprint hurdles. She represented her country at the 2012 World Indoor Championships reaching the semifinals.

Her personal bests are 12.85 seconds in the 100 metres hurdles (0.0 m/s, Zürich 2014) and 8.03 seconds in the 60 metres hurdles (Karlsruhe 2012).

== International competitions ==
Year	Competition	Venue	Position	Event	Notes
Representing the Netherlands
2007	European Youth Summer Olympic Festival	Belgrade, Serbia	8th	100 m hurdles (76.2 cm)	14.12
2009	European Junior Championships	Novi Sad, Serbia	–	100 m hurdles	DNF
2011	European U23 Championships	Ostrava, Czech Republic	14th (h)	100 m hurdles	13.88
2012	World Indoor Championships	Istanbul, Turkey	12th (sf)	60 m hurdles	8.18
2012	European Championships	Helsinki, Finland	24th (h)	100 m hurdles	13.59
2013	European Indoor Championships	Gothenburg, Sweden	7th (sf)	60 m hurdles	8.05
2014	European Championships	Zürich, Switzerland	10th (sf)	100 m hurdles	12.92
2017	European Indoor Championships	Belgrade, Serbia	10th (sf)	60 m hurdles	8.20
2017	World Championships	London, United Kingdom	22nd (sf)	100 m hurdles	13.29
