= Olena Yanovska =

Ukrainian hurdler

Personal information
- Born: 15 February 1990 (age 36)
- Height: 1.71 m (5 ft 7 in)
- Weight: 62 kg (137 lb)

Sport
- Sport: Athletics
- Events: 100 m hurdles, 60 m hurdles

Olena Yanovska (Ukrainian: Олена Яновська; born 15 February 1990) is a Ukrainian athlete competing in the sprint hurdles. She represented her country at the 2016 Summer Olympics without advancing from the first round.

Her personal bests are 13.00 seconds in the 100 metres hurdles (+1.3 m/s, Almaty 2016) and 8.16 seconds in the 60 metres hurdles (Łódź 2015).

== International competitions ==
Year	Competition	Venue	Position	Event	Notes
Representing Ukraine
2011	European U23 Championships	Ostrava, Czech Republic	6th	100 m hurdles	13.49
2011	European U23 Championships	Ostrava, Czech Republic	–	4 × 100 m relay	DQ
2015	European Indoor Championships	Prague, Czech Republic	23rd (h)	60 m hurdles	8.27
2016	European Championships	Amsterdam, Netherlands	13th (h)	100 m hurdles	13.23
2016	Olympic Games	Rio de Janeiro, Brazil	41st (h)	100 m hurdles	13.32
2017	European Indoor Championships	Belgrade, Serbia	20th (h)	60 m hurdles	8.33
