= Caridad Jerez =

Spanish hurdler

Personal information
- Born: 23 January 1991 (age 35) Palma de Mallorca, Spain
- Height: 1.70 m (5 ft 7 in)
- Weight: 58 kg (128 lb)

Sport
- Sport: Track and field
- Event: 100 metres hurdles
- Club: FC Barcelona; Puerto Alicante
- Coached by: Joaquín Reyes

Caridad Jerez Castellanos (born 23 January 1991 in Palma de Mallorca) is a Spanish athlete specialising in the sprint hurdles.

Her personal bests are 12.94 seconds in the 100 metres hurdles (+1.4 m/s, Salamanca 2015) and 8.09 seconds in the 60 metres hurdles (Orense 2020).

== Competition record ==
Year	Competition	Venue	Position	Event	Notes
Representing Spain
2009	European Junior Championships	Novi Sad, Serbia	17th (h)	100 m hurdles	14.25
2010	World Junior Championships	Moncton, Canada	23rd (h)	100 m hurdles	13.98
2010	World Junior Championships	Moncton, Canada	14th (h)	4 × 100 m relay	46.36
2011	European U23 Championships	Ostrava, Czech Republic	12th (h)	100 m hurdles	13.81
2014	European Championships	Zurich, Switzerland	21st (h)	100 m hurdles	13.13
2015	European Indoor Championships	Prague, Czech Republic	21st (h)	60 m hurdles	8.20
2015	World Championships	Beijing, China	29th (h)	100 m hurdles	13.27
2016	European Championships	Amsterdam, Netherlands	12th (h)	100 m hurdles	13.21^{1}
2016	Olympic Games	Rio de Janeiro, Brazil	37th (h)	100 m hurdles	13.26
2017	European Indoor Championships	Belgrade, Serbia	18th (h)	60 m hurdles	8.26
2018	Mediterranean Games	Tarragona, Spain	5th	100 m hurdles	13.40
2018	European Championships	Berlin, Germany	24th (sf)	100 m hurdles	15.34
2019	European Indoor Championships	Glasgow, United Kingdom	25th (h)	60 m hurdles	8.38
2021	European Indoor Championships	Toruń, Poland	35th (h)	60 m hurdles	8.29

^{1}Disqualified in the semifinals
