= Lucie Škrobáková =

Czech athlete (born 1982)

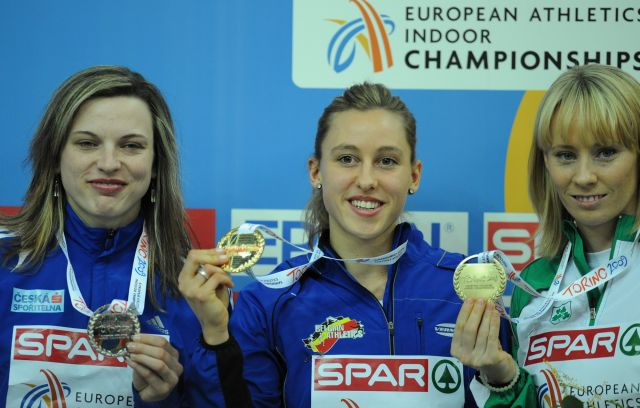
- Lucie Škrobáková (left)

Medal record

Representing Czech Republic

Women's athletics

European Indoor Championships
Silver medal – second place	2009 Turin	60 m hurdles

Lucie Škrobáková (Czech pronunciation: [ˈlutsɪjɛ ˈʃkrobaːkovaː]; born 4 January 1982) is a Czech athlete who competes in the 60 metres hurdles and 100 metres hurdles. She is the 2001 European junior bronze medallist, and took the silver medal at the 2009 European Indoor Championships. Her personal best times are 12.73 seconds and 7.95 s in the 100 and 60 metres hurdles respectively.

== Junior career ==
Škrobáková was born in Hodonín. As a junior athlete, she competed in the 400 metre hurdles at the 1999 World Youth Championships and the 100 metre hurdles at the 2000 World Junior Championships, but failed to reach the final round in either event. She then won the bronze medal at the 2001 European Junior Championships in a wind-assisted 13.30 s. Her personal best time in 2001, her last year as a junior, was 13.52 s, achieved in July 2001 in Jablonec nad Nisou.

== Senior career ==
In 2002 Škrobáková recorded 8.28 s in the 60 metre hurdles, in February, and 13.46 s in the 100 metre hurdles, in June. She competed at the European Indoor Championships and the European Championships, without reaching the final. In 2003, she lowered her personal best time to 13.15 s at a meet in Bydgoszcz. Further improvements came in 2004, when she improved to 8.07 s and 13.08 s in the 60 and 100 metre hurdles. She competed at the World Indoor Championships as well as the Olympic Games, but again she failed to progress past the first round. She did reach the semi-final at the 2005 European Indoor Championships, and during the summer of 2005 she improved her personal best slightly, recording 13.07 s in June in Prague.

Over the next three seasons, she was consistent in the 60 metre hurdles, but struggled in the 100 metre distance. She recorded 13.27 s in 2006 and 13.46 s in 2007, competing without success at the 2006 European Championships. However, in 2008 she managed to set a new national record, with 12.93 s in July in Tábor. She also competed at the 2008 Olympic Games. In 2009, she competed at the 2009 European Indoor Championships. After 8.07 in the heats and 8.05 s in the semi-final, she took the silver medal, behind Eline Berings but ahead of reigning champion Derval O'Rourke and Christina Vukicevic. Her time of 7.95 s was a new national indoor record. Škrobáková improved her national record in the 100 metre hurdles with 12.73 s in July 2009 in Kladno (at that moment her time ranked 4th among world hurdlers for 2009 season).

== Personal life ==
Born with the name Škrobáková, she married and for some years bore the last name Martincová. After divorcing, she reverted to her birth name.

== Competition record ==
Year	Competition	Venue	Position	Event	Notes
Representing the Czech Republic
1999	World Youth Championships	Bydgoszcz, Poland	20th (h)	400 m hurdles	62.70
2000	World Junior Championships	Santiago, Chile	20th (h)	100 m hurdles	13.86 (wind: +0.6 m/s)
2001	European Junior Championships	Grosseto, Italy	3rd	100 m hurdles	13.30 (w)
2002	European Indoor Championships	Vienna, Austria	18th (h)	60 m hurdles	8.35
2002	European Championships	Munich, Germany	29th (h)	100 m hurdles	13.66
2003	European U23 Championships	Bydgoszcz, Poland	6th (sf)	100 m hurdles	13.15 (wind: 1.2 m/s)
2004	World Indoor Championships	Budapest, Hungary	25th (h)	60 m hurdles	8.29
2004	Olympic Games	Athens, Greece	30th (h)	100 m hurdles	13.51
2005	European Indoor Championships	Madrid, Spain	14th (sf)	60 m hurdles	8.20
2006	European Championships	Gothenburg, Sweden	24th (h)	100 m hurdles	13.45
2006	European Championships	Gothenburg, Sweden	–	4 × 100 m relay	DQ
2008	Olympic Games	Beijing, China	25th (h)	100 m hurdles	13.18
2009	European Indoor Championships	Turin, Italy	2nd	60 m hurdles	7.95
2009	World Championships	Berlin, Germany	12th (sf)	100 m hurdles	12.92
2010	World Indoor Championships	Doha, Qatar	13th (sf)	60 m hurdles	8.13
2010	European Championships	Barcelona, Spain	11th (sf)	100 m hurdles	13.10
2011	European Indoor Championships	Paris, France	7th	60 m hurdles	8.10
2011	World Championships	Daegu, South Korea	16th (sf)	100 m hurdles	12.98
2012	World Indoor Championships	Istanbul, Turkey	11th (sf)	60 m hurdles	8.18
2012	European Championships	Helsinki, Finland	9th (sf)	100 m hurdles	13.17
2012	Olympic Games	London, United Kingdom	10th (sf)	100 m hurdles	12.81
2013	European Indoor Championships	Gothenburg, Sweden	10th (sf)	60 m hurdles	8.09
2013	World Championships	Moscow, Russia	24th (h)	100 m hurdles	13.24
2014	European Championships	Zürich, Switzerland	26th (h)	100 m hurdles	13.29
2015	European Indoor Championships	Prague, Czech Republic	18th (h)	60 m hurdles	8.17
