= Ivana Lončarek =

Croatian hurdler (born 1991)

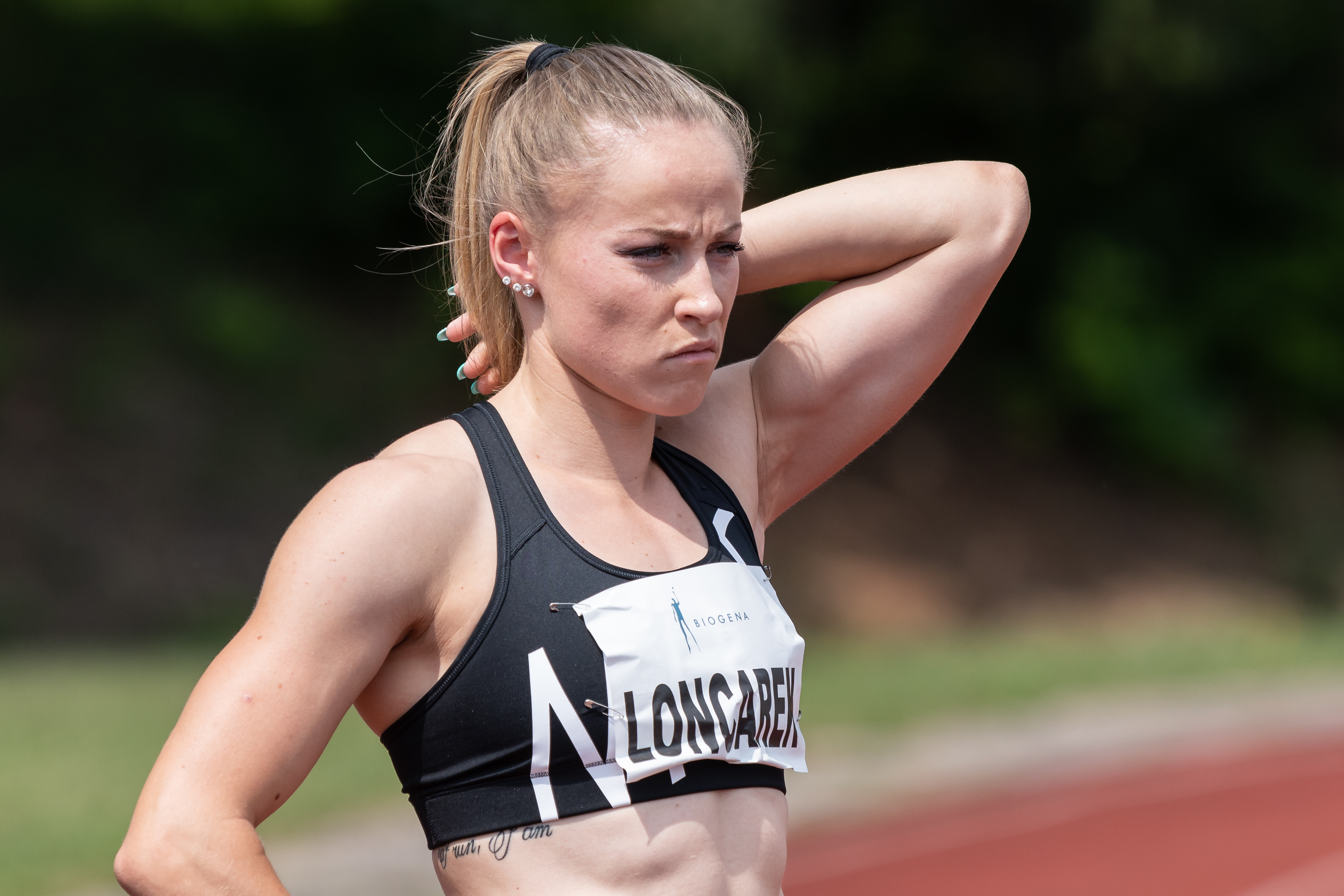

Personal information
- Born: April 8, 1991 (age 34)
- Education: University of Zagreb

Sport
- Sport: Athletics
- Event: 100 m hurdles

Ivana Lončarek (born 8 April 1991) is a Croatian athlete specialising in the sprint hurdles.

She has personal bests of 13.09 seconds in the 100 metres hurdles (-0.3 m/s, Pitesti 2016) and 8.22 seconds in the 60 metres hurdles (Gothenburg 2013).

== International competitions ==
Year	Competition	Venue	Position	Event	Notes
Representing Croatia
2007	World Youth Championships	Ostrava, Czech Republic	5th	100 m hurdles (76.2 cm)	13.76
2007	World Youth Championships	Ostrava, Czech Republic	12th (h)	400 m hurdles	61.38
2007	European Youth Olympic Festival	Belgrade, Serbia	3rd	100 m hurdles (76.2 cm)	13.80
2007	European Youth Olympic Festival	Belgrade, Serbia	12th (h)	400 m hurdles	64.81
2009	European Junior Championships	Novi Sad, Serbia	10th (h)	100 m hurdles	13.94
2010	World Junior Championships	Moncton, Canada	11th (sf)	100 m hurdles	13.83
2011	European U23 Championships	Ostrava, Czech Republic	13th (h)	100 m hurdles	13.81
2013	European Indoor Championships	Gothenburg, Sweden	19th (h)	60 m hurdles	8.22
2013	European U23 Championships	Tampere, Finland	7th	100 m hurdles	13.66
2014	European Championships	Zürich, Switzerland	23rd (h)	100 m hurdles	13.15
2014	European Championships	Zürich, Switzerland	15th (h)	4 × 100 m relay	45.47
2015	Universiade	Gwangju, South Korea	7th	100 m hurdles	13.37
2016	European Championships	Amsterdam, Netherlands	15th (h)	100 m hurdles	13.27
2017	European Indoor Championships	Belgrade, Serbia	10th (sf)	60 m hurdles	8.20
2017	Universiade	Taipei, Taiwan	14th (sf)	100 m hurdles	13.92
2018	World Indoor Championships	Birmingham, United Kingdom	20th (sf)	60 m hurdles	8.21
2018	Mediterranean Games	Tarragona, Spain	4th	100 m hurdles	13.40
2018	European Championships	Berlin, Germany	13th (h)	100 m hurdles	13.23
2019	European Indoor Championships	Glasgow, United Kingdom	16th (sf)	60 m hurdles	8.27
2021	European Indoor Championships	Toruń, Poland	31st (h)	60 m hurdles	8.26
2022	World Indoor Championships	Belgrade, Serbia	28th (h)	60 m hurdles	8.19
2022	Mediterranean Games	Oran, Algeria	12th (h)	110 m hurdles	13.69
2022	European Championships	Munich, Germany	16th (h)	100 m hurdles	13.50
