= Noemi Zbären =

Swiss hurdler (born 1994)

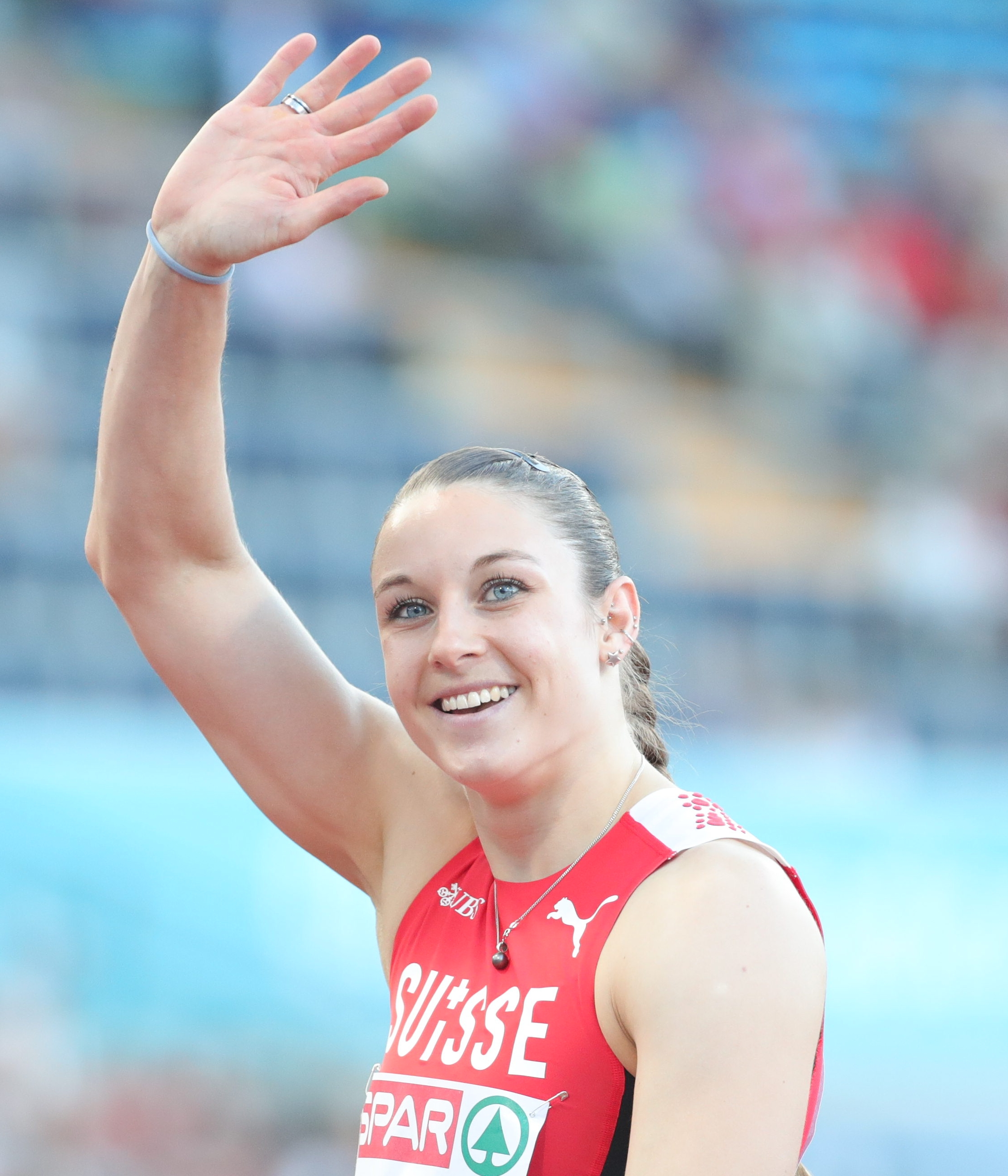
- Zbären in 2022

Personal information
- Born: March 12, 1994 (age 32) Langnau im Emmental

Noemi Zbären (born 12 March 1994 in Langnau im Emmental) is a Swiss hurdler. At the 2012 Summer Olympics, she competed in the Women's 100 metres hurdles, coming 6th in her heat with a time of 13.33 seconds.

== Achievements ==
Year	Competition	Venue	Position	Event	Notes
Representing Switzerland
2010	Youth Olympic Games	Singapore	3rd	100 m hurdles (76.2 cm)	13.50
2011	World Youth Championships	Lille, France	2nd	100 m hurdles (76.2 cm)	13.17
2012	World Junior Championships	Barcelona, Spain	2nd	100 m hurdles	13.43
2012	Olympic Games	London, United Kingdom	27th (h)	100 m hurdles	13.33
2013	European Indoor Championships	Gothenburg, Sweden	18th (h)	60 m hurdles	8.21
2013	European Junior Championships	Rieti, Italy	1st	100 m hurdles	13.17
2013	World Championships	Moscow, Russia	32nd (h)	100 m hurdles	13.59
2014	European Championships	Zürich, Switzerland	9th (sf)	100 m hurdles	13.01
2015	European Indoor Championships	Prague, Czech Republic	15th (sf)	60 m hurdles	8.19
2015	European U23 Championships	Tallinn, Estonia	1st	100 m hurdles	12.71
2015	World Championships	Beijing, China	6th	100 m hurdles	12.95
2021	European Indoor Championships	Toruń, Poland	19th (sf)	60 m hurdles	8.15
2022	World Indoor Championships	Belgrade, Serbia	9th (sf)	60 m hurdles	8.01
2022	World Championships	Eugene, United States	20th (sf)	100 m hurdles	12.94
2022	European Championships	Munich, Germany	14th (sf)	100 m hurdles	13.15

Awards and achievements
Preceded by (Russia) Mariya Kuchina	Women's European Athletics Rising Star of the Year; 2015	Succeeded by (Belgium) Nafissatou Thiam
