= Cindy Billaud =

French hurdler

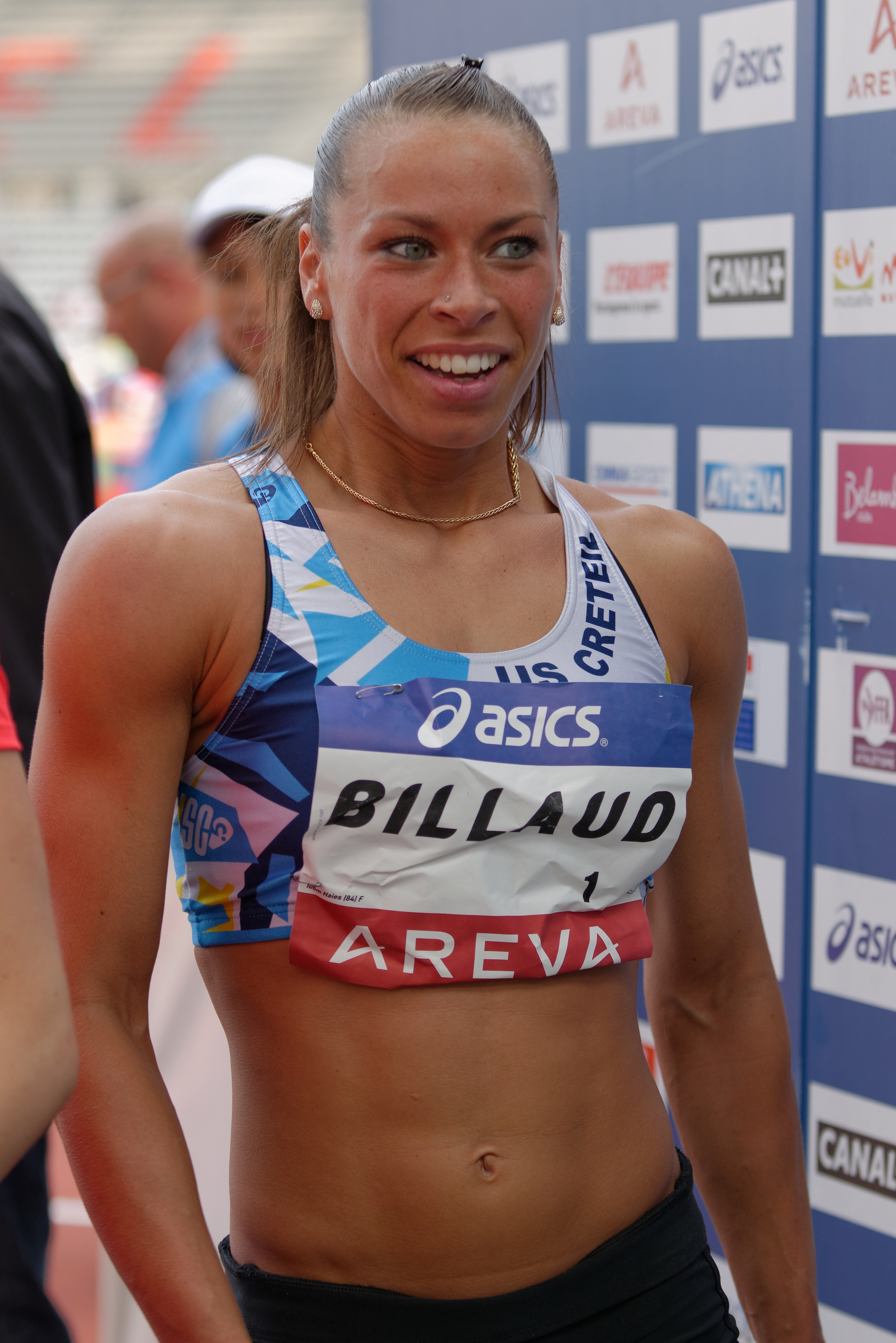
- Billaud in 2013

Personal information
- Born: 11 March 1986 (age 40) Nogent-sur-Marne, France
- Height: 167 cm (5 ft 6 in)
- Weight: 59 kg (130 lb)
Medal record
Women's athletics
Representing France
European Championships
Silver medal – second place	2014 Zürich	100 m hurdles

Cindy Billaud (born 11 March 1986 in Nogent-sur-Marne) is a French athlete specialising in the 100 metres hurdles. Her biggest success to date is the seventh place at the 2013 World Championships in Moscow.

Billaud competed for France at the 2016 Summer Olympics.

She has personal bests of 12.56 seconds in the 100 metres hurdles (2014) and 7.87 seconds in the 60 metres hurdles (2014).

== Competition record ==
Year	Competition	Venue	Position	Event	Notes
Representing France
2003	World Youth Championships	Sherbrooke, Canada	14th (sf)	100 m hurdles (76.2 cm)	13.95
2004	World Junior Championships	Grosseto, Italy	11th (sf)	100 m hurdles	13.83 (wind: -0.9 m/s)
2005	European Junior Championships	Kaunas, Lithuania	3rd	100 m hurdles	13.65
2007	European U23 Championships	Debrecen, Hungary	11th (sf)	100 m hurdles	13.60 (wind: -1.9 m/s)
2008	World Indoor Championships	Valencia, Spain	14th (sf)	60 m hurdles	8.19
2009	European Indoor Championships	Turin, Italy	7th	60 m hurdles	8.19
2009	World Championships	Berlin, Germany	20th (h)	100 m hurdles	13.20
2011	World Championships	Daegu, South Korea	33rd (h)	100 m hurdles	13.50
2013	World Championships	Moscow, Russia	7th	100 m hurdles	12.84
2014	World Indoor Championships	Sopot, Poland	4th	60 m hurdles	7.89
2014	European Championships	Zürich, Switzerland	2nd	100 m hurdles	12.79
2015	World Championships	Beijing, China	28th (h)	100 m hurdles	13.23
2016	European Championships	Amsterdam, Netherlands	7th	100 m hurdles	13.29
2016	Olympic Games	Rio de Janeiro, Brazil	17th (sf)	100 m hurdles	13.03

=== National ===
Year	Competition	Location	Event	Place	Time
2011	French Championships	Albi	100 m hurdles	2nd	13 s 05
2013	French Championships	Paris	100 m hurdles	1st	12 s 59
2014	French Championships	Reims	100 m hurdles	1st	12 s 58
2015	French Championships	Villeneuve-d'Ascq	100 m hurdles	1st	12 s 89

== Personal Bests ==
Records personnels
Event	Performance	Location	Date
100 m hurdles	12 s 56 =NR	France Reims	12 July 2014
60 m hurdles	7 s 87	Poland Sopot	7 March 2014
