= Nadine Hildebrand =

German hurdler

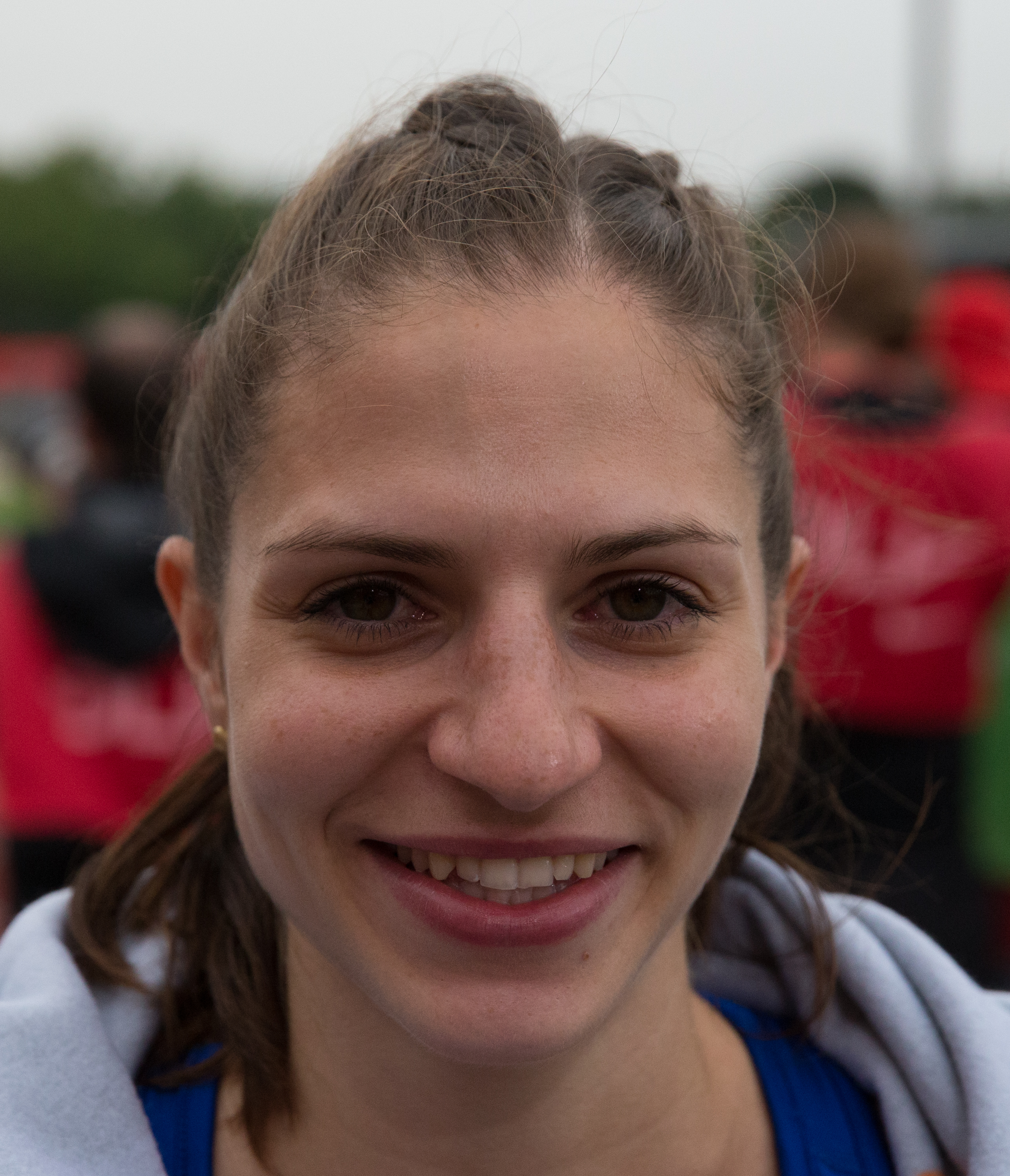
- Hildebrand in 2014

Personal information
- Born: 20 September 1987 (age 38) Stuttgart, West Germany
- Occupation: lawyer
- Height: 1.58 m (5 ft 2 in)
- Weight: 53 kg (117 lb)
- Website: Nadine-Hildebrand.de

Sport
- Country: Germany
- Sport: Athletics
- Event: 100 metres hurdles
- Club: VfL Sindelfingen
- Coached by: Werner Späth

Achievements and titles
- Personal bests: 100 m hurdles: 12.64s, Mannheim 2016

Nadine Hildebrand (born 20 September 1987) is a German track and field athlete who specialises in the 100 metres hurdles.

== Personal life ==
Hildebrand was born in Stuttgart and became interested in track and field at the age of 8, through her older sister Nicole.

Until 2002, she was running for Sportvereinigung Feuerbach. Shortly after, she trained at the Olympic Training Center Stuttgart under coach Sven Rees and started for LAZ Salamander Kornwestheim-Ludwigsburg.

Three years later, she qualified for an international competition for the first time and finished in sixth place at the European Athletics Junior Championships. During the same year, she started studying Jurisprudence at the University of Tübingen. In 2006, she again qualified for an international Highlight and reached the semifinals at the World Junior Championships in Beijing. She managed the same in 2007 during the European U23 Championships in Debrecen. She earned her first national title in 2007 during the junior championships and defended it in 2008. In the women's group, she became German vice champion the same year.

One year later, she qualified for her first international adult championship, by winning a title at the 2009 German Athletics Championships. At the European Indoor Championships in Turin, she reached the finals and finished in sixth place. However, she had to miss the Berlin World Championships at home because of a muscle inflammation in the upper thigh.

At the 2010 IAAF World Indoor Championships in Doha, she dropped out in the semifinals. During the semifinals of her first outdoor European Championships in Barcelona (2010), she reached a new personal best under 13s for the first time. She reached 8th place during the finals.

At the 2011 European Athletics Indoor Championships in Paris, she did not make it past the semifinals. In September 2011, she switched to her new coach Werner Späth.

In 2012, she set a new Württemberg record as well as a new personal best when she ran 12.94s at the qualifications for the Olympic Games in Mannheim. She reached the semifinals the same year at the European Championships in Helsinki. She was 0.02s away from qualifying for the Olympic Games. In November, she chose to switch to the VfL Sindelfingen club, which is where she had been training since late 2011.

In 2013, Hildebrand became the German Indoor Champion for the second time. One week later, at the European Indoor Championships in Gothenburg, she reached the semifinals. She reached her first Outdoor Championship win in Ulm, with a time of 12.90s. Shortly thereafter, 13.04s earned her 16th place at the World Championships in Moscow. In April of the same year, she completed her university degree with the 2nd Staatsexamen. As of September, she has been working at a Stuttgart law firm.

During the following year, she broke the elusive 8s threshold and won the Indoor Meeting in Karlsruhe with a new personal best of 7.91s, which was also the world record of the season thus far. Shortly after, she defended her title of German Indoor Champion in Leipzig. At the Indoor World Championships in Sopot two weeks later, she reached 7th place in the finals with 8.02s. At the 2014 European Team Championships in Braunschweig two weeks later, she contributed 11 points to the German team's win. She defended her German Outdoor Championship title in Ulm with a new record for this championship and a new personal best of 12.17s. At the European Championships in Zurich, she reached 6th place in the finals.

Hildebrand is 1.58 m (5 ft 2 in) tall and weighs 53 kg (117 lb).

== Achievements ==
Year	Competition	Venue	Position	Event	Notes
Representing Germany
2005	European Junior Championships	Kaunas, Lithuania	6th	100 m hurdles	13.88
2006	World Junior Championships	Beijing, China	13th (sf)	100m hurdles	13.95 (-1.7 m/s)
2007	European U23 Championships	Debrecen, Hungary	14th (sf)	100 m hurdles	13.71 (-1.4 m/s)
2009	European Indoor Championships	Turin, Italy	6th	60 m hurdles	8.16
2010	World Indoor Championships	Doha, Qatar	14th (sf)	60 m hurdles	8.17
2010	European Championships	Barcelona, Spain	8th	100 m hurdles	13.08
2011	European Indoor Championships	Paris, France	15th (sf)	60 m hurdles	8.23
2012	European Championships	Helsinki, Finland	15th (sf)	100 m hurdles	13.52
2013	European Indoor Championships	Gothenburg, Sweden	11th (sf)	60 m hurdles	8.11
2013	World Championships	Moscow, Russia	16th (sf)	100 m hurdles	13.04
2014	World Indoor Championships	Sopot, Poland	7th	60 m hurdles	8.02
2014	European Championships	Zürich, Switzerland	6th	100 m hurdles	13.01
2016	European Championships	Amsterdam, Netherlands	7th (sf)	100 m hurdles	12.95
2016	Olympic Games	Rio de Janeiro, Brazil	14th (sf)	100 m hurdles	12.95
2017	World Championships	London, United Kingdom	24th (h)	100 m hurdles	13.14
