= Hanna Plotitsyna =

Ukrainian hurdler

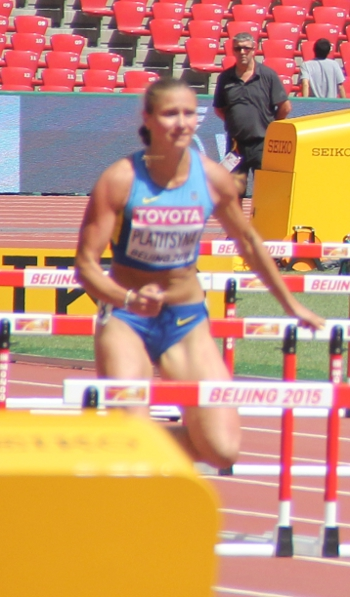
Hanna Plotitsyna in 2015

Hanna Oleksandrivna Plotitsyna (Ukrainian: Ганна Олександрівна Плотіцина; born 1 January 1987 in Sumy) is a Ukrainian athlete specialising in the sprint hurdles. She represented her country at the 2013 World Championships and 2014 World Indoor Championships without qualifying to the semifinals.

She has personal bests of 12.89 seconds in the 100 metres hurdles (+0.9 m/s; Kropyvnytskiy 2017) and 7.92 seconds indoors (Beograd 2017).

== Competition record ==
Year	Competition	Venue	Position	Event	Notes
Representing the Ukraine
2006	World Junior Championships	Beijing, China	11th (sf)	100 m	13.91 (-1.6 m/s)
2006	World Junior Championships	Beijing, China	7th	4 × 400 m relay	3:36.97
2007	European U23 Championships	Debrecen, Hungary	29th (h)	100 m	12.14
2007	European U23 Championships	Debrecen, Hungary	3rd	4 × 400 m relay	3:33.90
2013	European Indoor Championships	Gothenburg, Sweden	15th (sf)	60 m hurdles	8.16
2013	Universiade	Kazan, Russia	4th	100 m hurdles	13.04
2013	World Championships	Moscow, Russia	27th (h)	100 m hurdles	13.30
2014	World Indoor Championships	Sopot, Poland	19th (h)	60 m hurdles	8.15
2015	European Indoor Championships	Prague, Czech Republic	8th	60 m hurdles	8.10
2015	World Championships	Beijing, China	26th (h)	100 m hurdles	13.15
2016	World Indoor Championships	Portland, United States	9th (h)	60 m hurdles	8.09
2016	European Championships	Amsterdam, Netherlands	11th (sf)	100 m hurdles	13.02
2016	Olympic Games	Rio de Janeiro, Brazil	34th (h)	100 m hurdles	13.12
2017	European Indoor Championships	Belgrade, Serbia	4th	60 m hurdles	7.96
2017	World Championships	London, United Kingdom	16th (sf)	100 m hurdles	13.08
2017	World Championships	London, United Kingdom	11th (h)	4 × 100 m relay	43.77
2018	World Indoor Championships	Birmingham, United Kingdom	14th (sf)	60 m hurdles	8.09
2018	European Championships	Berlin, Germany	14th (h)	100 m hurdles	13.23
2018	European Championships	Berlin, Germany	10th (h)	4 × 100 m relay	43.90
2019	European Indoor Championships	Glasgow, United Kingdom	11th (sf)	60 m hurdles	8.11
2019	World Relays	Yokohama, Japan	14th (h)	4 × 100 m relay	44.55
2019	World Championships	Doha, Qatar	30th (h)	100 m hurdles	13.30
2021	European Indoor Championships	Toruń, Poland	26th (h)	60 m hurdles	8.22
2022	World Indoor Championships	Belgrade, Serbia	23rd (sf)	60 m hurdles	8.22
2022	European Championships	Munich, Germany	20th (h)	100 m hurdles	13.66
2023	European Indoor Championships	Istanbul, Turkey	27th (h)	60 m hurdles	8.26
2024	World Indoor Championships	Glasgow, United Kingdom	32nd (h)	60 m hurdles	8.22
2024	European Championships	Rome, Italy	16th (h)	100 m hurdles	13.35
2025	European Indoor Championships	Apeldoorn, Netherlands	30th (h)	60 m hurdles	8.24
2025	World Indoor Championships	Nanjing, China	32nd (h)	60 m hurdles	8.26
