= Isabelle Pedersen =

Norwegian hurdler (born 1992)

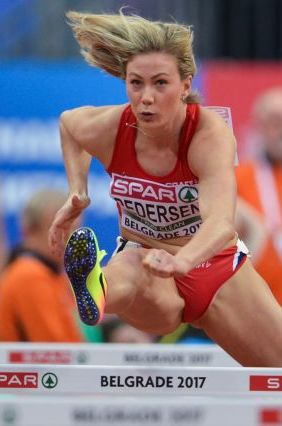
- Isabelle Pedersen in 2017

Personal information
- Full name: Isabelle Sandstedt Pedersen
- Nationality: Norway
- Born: January 27, 1992 (age 34) Bergen, Norway
- Height: 1.70 m (5 ft 7 in)
- Weight: 61 kg (134 lb; 9.6 st)

Sport
- Sport: Running
- Events: 60 metres hurdles 100 metres hurdles

Achievements and titles
- Personal bests: 60 m hurdles indoors: 7.86 s (Birmingham, 2018); 100 m hurdles: 12.72 s NR (London, 2018)
Medal record
Women's athletics
Representing Norway
European U23 Championships
Gold medal – first place	2013 Tampere	100 m hurdles
World Junior Championships
Gold medal – first place	2010 Moncton	100 m hurdles
European Junior Championships
Silver medal – second place	2009 Novi Sad	100 m hurdles
Silver medal – second place	2011 Tallinn	100 m hurdles
World Youth Championships
Gold medal – first place	2009 Brixen	100 m hurdles

Isabelle Pedersen (born January 27, 1992) is a Norwegian former track and field athlete who competed in hurdling. She is a European U23 Championships, World Junior Championships and World Youth Championships gold medallist, and two-time European Junior Championships silver medallist in 100 metres hurdles. She is also a twelve-time Norwegian national champion, with seven titles in 100 m hurdles, one in long jump and 4 × 100 m relay each, and three in 60 m hurdles indoors.

Pedersen competed at the 2016 Summer Olympics in the women's 100 m hurdles event. She holds the Norwegian record in women's 100 m hurdles with a time of 12.72 seconds, set in 2018. Pedersen retired from competing in 2022.

== Career ==
At the 2009 World Youth Championships, Pedersen became the world champion in the 100 metres hurdles (76.2 cm) with a time of 13.23. In the semifinals, she ran a 13.20 which was a European record for U18 class until 2011. At the 2010 World Junior Championships, Pedersen won the 100 meters hurdles with a time of 13.30 and in the process set a new Norwegian junior record. She was awarded the Karoline Price the same year.

The following year, Pedersen won silver in the 100 meters hurdles at the 2011 European Junior Championships. She finished in 13.37 and was beaten by Finn Nooralotta Neziri by three hundredths of a second. In 2011, Pedersen improved her Norwegian junior record with a time of 13.21.

At the 2012 European Championships in Helsinki, she was eliminated in the preliminary round of the 100 metres hurdles with a time of 13.38. During the 2012/13 indoor season, she managed to improve her personal record at the 2013 European Indoor Championships to 8.18 in the 60 metres hurdles and took the semifinals. In the outdoor season, she opened the season promising with a time of 13.06 in a strong tailwind. During the Bislett Games, she improved her personal best time of 13.16 seconds in the approved wind. During friidrettsgalaen in Mannheim, Germany, she further improved her personal record to 13.04. Thus, she qualified at the 2013 World Championships in Moscow (B standard). At the World Championships, she finished 30th overall with a time of 13.43 and did not advance past the heats. In July 2013, Pedersen competed at the 2013 European U23 Championships and won gold in the final with a time of 13.12, ahead of Pole Karolina Kołeczek (13.30).

At the 2014 European Team Championships, Pedersen won the 100 metres hurdles with a time of 13.18. She finished 5th in the 60 metres hurdles at the 2015 European Indoor Championships with a time of 7.96. In 2017, Pedersen competed in 60 m hurdles in Meeting de Paris Indoor (9 Feb. 2017) where she got second place with a time of 8.02". She also competed in Karlsruhe indoor meeting where she raced in 60 m hurdles and got the time of 7.98" (4 Feb. 2017). In February 2017, Pedersen competed in Müller Indoor Grand Prix in Birmingham and she raced for 60m hurdles with a time of 8.22" in heats, but did not reach finals. She participated in 2017 European Athletics Indoor Championships in Belgrade and competed on 3 March 2017 and reached the finals for 60m hurdles and was placed 5th with a time of 8.01".

In April 2017, Pedersen competed in 100 m hurdles event in Columbia, USA and finished second with a season best of 12.89 seconds (wind +1.2 m/s), which qualified her for the 2017 World Championships in Athletics. In July 2018, she set a new Norwegian record in 100 m hurdles with a time of 12.72 seconds at the London Athletics Meet.

== Competition record ==
Representing Norway
Year	Competition	Venue	Position	Event	Notes
2008	World Junior Championships	Bydgoszcz, Poland	12th (sf)	100 m hurdles	13.82 (-0.3 m/s)
2009	World Youth Championships	Brixen, Italy	1st	100 m hurdles (76.2 cm)	13.23
2009	European Junior Championships	Novi Sad, Serbia	2nd	100 m hurdles	13.49
2010	World Junior Championships	Moncton, Canada	1st	100 m hurdles	13.30 (+0.9 m/s)
2011	European Junior Championships	Tallinn, Estonia	2nd	100 m hurdles	13.37
2012	European Championships	Helsinki, Finland	21st (h)	100 m hurdles	13.38
2013	European Indoor Championships	Gothenburg, Sweden	16th (sf)	60 m hurdles	8.22
2013	European U23 Championships	Tampere, Finland	1st	100 m hurdles	13.12 (-0.1 m/s)
2013	World Championships	Moscow, Russia	30th (h)	100 m hurdles	13.43
2014	European Team Championships	Braunschweig, Germany	1st	100 m hurdles	13.18
2015	European Indoor Championships	Prague, Czech Republic	5th	60 m hurdles	7.96
2015	World Championships	Beijing, China	8th (sf)	100 m hurdles	12.86
2016	European Championships	Amsterdam, Netherlands	17th (sf)	100 m hurdles	13.20
2016	Olympic Games	Rio de Janeiro, Brazil	10th (sf)	100 m hurdles	12.88
2017	European Indoor Championships	Belgrade, Serbia	5th	60 m hurdles	8.01
2017	World Championships	London, United Kingdom	9th (sf)	100 m hurdles	12.87
2018	World Indoor Championships	Birmingham, United Kingdom	6th	60 m hurdles	7.94
2018	European Championships	Berlin, Germany	14h (sf)	100 m hurdles	13.04
