= Veronica Borsi =

Italian hurdler (born 1987)

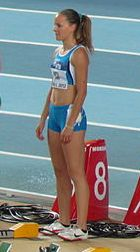
- Veronica Borsi at Istanbul 2012 (World Indoor Championships)

Personal information
- Nationality: Italian
- Born: 13 June 1987 (age 39) Bracciano, Italy
- Height: 1.68 m (5 ft 6 in)
- Weight: 51 kg (112 lb)

Sport
- Country: Italy
- Sport: Athletics
- Event: 100 metres hurdles
- Club: G.S. Fiamme Gialle; Acsi Italia Atletica (2018-)

Achievements and titles
- Personal bests: 100 m hs: 12.76 (2013); 60 m hs: 7.94 (2013)
Medal record
European Indoor Championships
Silver medal – second place	2013 Goteborg	60 m hs
Mediterranean Games
Silver medal – second place	2013 Mersin	100 metres hs
Military World Games
Silver medal – second place	2011 Rio de Janeiro	100 m hs

Veronica Borsi (born 13 June 1987 in Bracciano) is an Italian hurdler.

== Biography ==
In 2012 with her personal best in the 100 metres hurdles, 13.05 has obtained the pass for her first Olympic appearance in London 2012 and also the standard for 2012 European Athletics Championships in Helsinki.

In 2013, she sets her personal best in the 60 metres hurdles on Mondeville, France, with the crono of 8.06, sixth world best of the year at that day. Than, in 2013, she set also national record in 60 m hs (7.94 at European Indoor Championships) and 100 m hs (12.76).

After a few unlucky seasons, 2018 had started in the best way for Borsi, who had managed to get the qualification for the Indoor World Championships. But the season started on 5 May, at the Italian Athletics Clubs Championships in Ostia, with an injury to the Achilles tendon that forced her to quit the 2018 season.

== National records ==
- 60 metres hurdles: 7.94 ( (Sweden) Gothenburg, 1 March 2013) - Current holder
- 100 metres hurdles: 12.76 ( (Italy) Orvieto, 2 June 2013) - Current holder

== Progression ==
100 metres hurdles

Year	Performance	Venue	Date	World Ranking	Europe Ranking
2017	13.20	(Italy) Orvieto	28/05/2017		
2014	13.17	(Italy) Orvieto	01/06/2014		
2013	12.76	(Italy) Orvieto	02/06/2013	17th	4th
2012	13.05	(France) Montgeron	13/05/2012	80th	
2011	13.08	(Brazil) Rio de Janeiro	22/07/2011		
2010	13.37	(Italy) Osimo	10/07/2010		
2009	13.92	(Italy) Rovereto	01/09/2009		
2005	13.49	(France) Marseille	07/08/2005		
2004	13.75	(Italy) Brixen	19/05/2004		

== Personal bests ==
- 100 m hs: 12.76 - 2 June 2013 (Italy) Orvieto
- 60 m hs: 7.94 - 1 March 2013 (Sweden) Gothenburg

== Achievements ==
Year	Competition	Venue	Position	Event	Time	Notes
2004	World Junior Championships	(Italy) Grosseto	Heats (23rd)	100 m hs	14.09	(wind: +0.4 m/s)
2007	European U23 Championships	(Hungary) Debrecen	Heats (26th)	100 m hs	14.10	(wind: 0.2 m/s)
2009	European U23 Championships	(Lithuania) Kaunas	SF (13th)	100 m hs	13.54	(wind: 0.3 m/s)
2011	Summer Universiade	(China) Shenzhen	SF	100 m hs	13.56	
2012	World Indoor Championships	(Turkey) Istanbul	SF	60 m hs	8.18	PB
2013	European Indoor Championships	(Sweden) Gothenburg	2nd	60 m hs	7.94	NR
2013	Mediterranean Games	(Turkey) Mersin	2nd	100 m hs	13.05	
2018	World Indoor Championships	(United Kingdom) Birmingham	Heats	60 m hs	8.27	

== National titles ==
- Italian Athletics Indoor Championships
  - 60 metres hurdles: 2012, 2013, 2018

== See also ==
- Italian records in athletics
- Italian all-time lists - 100 metres hurdles
