= Yuliya Kondakova =

Russian hurdler

Yuliya Andreyevna Kondakova (Russian: Ю́лия Андре́евна Кондако́ва; born 4 December 1981 in Leningrad, Soviet Union) is a Russian hurdler. At the 2008 and 2012 Summer Olympics, she competed in the Women's 100 metres hurdles. Her personal bests are 12.73 in the 100 meters hurdles (set at the 2013 World Championships in Moscow) and 7.93 in the indoor 60 meters hurdles (2013).

In February 2019, the Court of Arbitration for Sport handed her a four-year ban for doping, starting from 1 February 2019. On appeal, her four-year ban was reduced to two years and nine months with all of her results from 17 July 2012 to 31 December 2014 disqualified.

== International competitions ==
Representing Russia
Year	Competition	Venue	Position	Event	Notes
2008	World Indoor Championships	Valencia, Spain	7th	60 m hurdles	10.19
2008	Olympic Games	Beijing, China	22nd (h)	100 m hurdles	13.07
2009	European Indoor Championships	Turin, Italy	10th (sf)	60 m hurdles	8.08
2009	World Championships	Berlin, Germany]	13th (sf)	100 m hurdles	13.00
2012	European Championships	Helsinki, Finland	13th (sf)	100 m hurdles	13.32
2012	Olympic Games	London, United Kingdom	DSQ	100 m hurdles	~~13.13~~
2013	World Championships	Moscow, Russia	DSQ	100 m hurdles	~~12.86~~
2014	World Indoor Championships	Sopot, Poland	DSQ	60 m hurdles	~~8.08~~
2014	European Championships	Zürich, Switzerland	DSQ	100 m hurdles	~~13.11~~

== See also ==
- List of doping cases in athletics
- Doping at the Olympic Games
