= Nooralotta Neziri =

Finnish hurdler (born 1992)

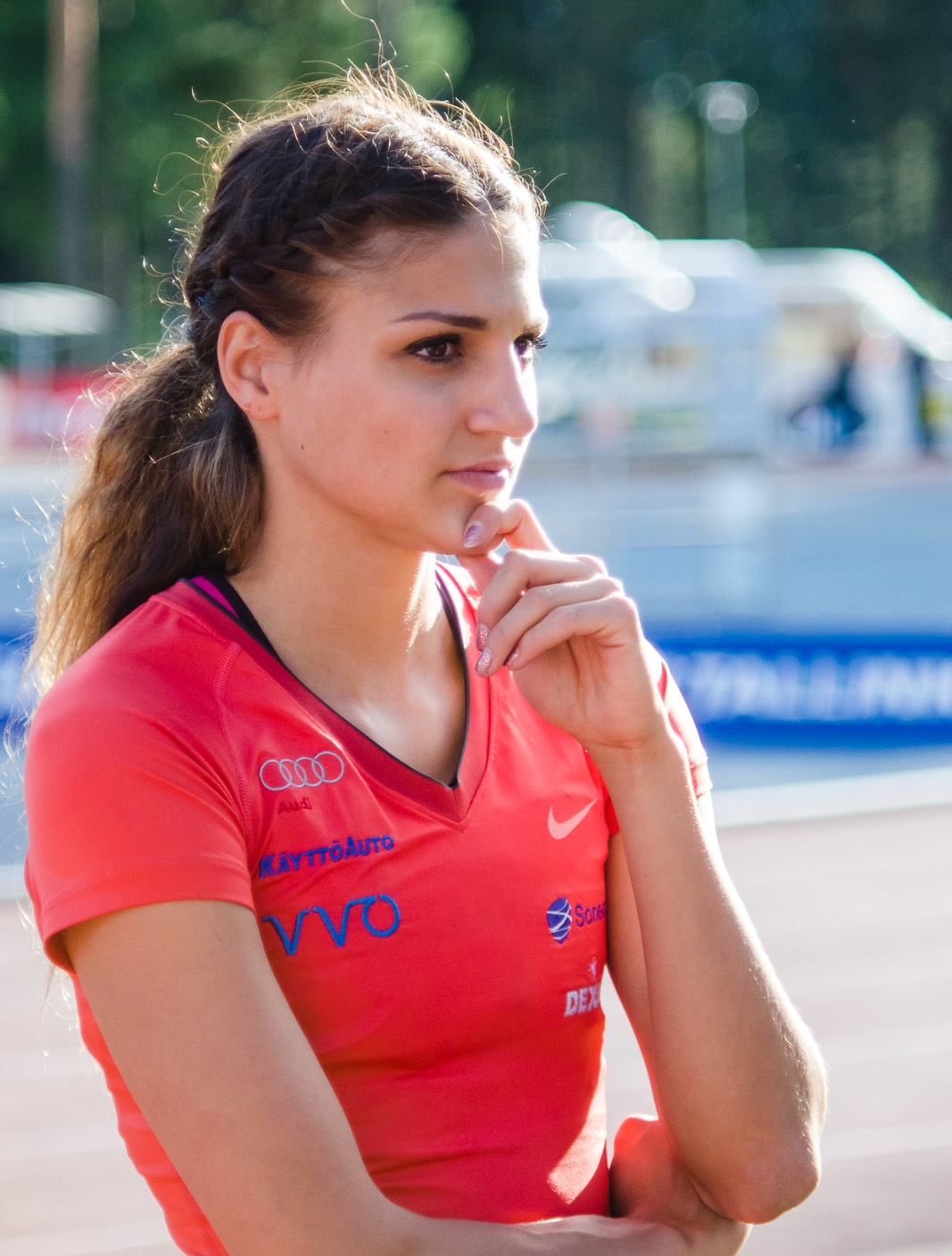
- Nooralotta Neziri in 2013

Personal information
- Full name: Nooralotta Maria Neziri
- Nickname: NoLo
- Nationality: Finnish
- Born: 9 November 1992 (age 33) Turku, Finland
- Height: 1.74 m (5 ft 9 in)
- Weight: 63 kg (139 lb)
- Website: http://www.nooralotta.fi

Sport
- Country: Finland
- Sport: Athletics
- Event: 100m hurdles
- Club: Jyväskylän Kenttäurheilijat
- Coached by: Petteri Jouste

Achievements and titles
- Personal best: 100m hurdles: 12.73 s (Espoo 2025)
Medal record
Representing Finland
Women's athletics
European Junior Championships
Gold medal – first place	2011 Tallinn	100 m hurdles
European U23 Championships
Bronze medal – third place	2013 Tampere	100 m hurdles
- Updated on June 4, 2015

Nooralotta Maria Neziri (born 9 November 1992 in Turku, Finland) is a Finnish 100 meter hurdler.

She was born to a Finnish mother and a Macedonian Albanian father in Turku, and lived in Pori from her early childhood until June 2017 when she moved to Jyväskylä, but moved back to Pori in October 2022. Neziri's record in 100m hurdles is 12.73. Together with Reetta Hurske, Neziri is also a Finnish record holder in women's indoor 60 metres hurdles with a time of 7.92. Her 100m personal best is 11.48, which makes her the 8th fastest Finnish woman of all time.

== Competition record ==
Year	Competition	Venue	Position	Event	Notes
Representing Finland
2009	World Youth Championships	Brixen, Italy	5th	100 m hurdles (76.2 cm)	13.44
2010	World Junior Championships	Moncton, Canada	5th	100 m hurdles	13.49 (+0.9 m/s)
2011	European Junior Championships	Tallinn, Estonia	1st	100 m hurdles	13.34
2012	European Championships	Helsinki, Finland	17th (h)	100 m hurdles	13.23
2013	European Indoor Championships	Gothenburg, Sweden	8th	60 m hurdles	8.19
2013	European U23 Championships	Tampere, Finland	3rd	100 m hurdles	13.39 (-0.1 m/s)
2013	World Championships	Moscow, Russia	17th (sf)	100 m hurdles	13.04 (NR)
2014	World Indoor Championships	Sopot, Poland	25th (h)	60 m hurdles	8.21
2014	European Championships	Zürich, Switzerland	17th (h)	100 m hurdles	13.17
2014	European Championships	Zürich, Switzerland	11th (h)	4 × 100 m relay	44.22
2015	European Indoor Championships	Prague, Czech Republic	6th	60 m hurdles	7.97 (NR)
2015	World Championships	Beijing, China	24th (h)	100 m hurdles	13.13
2016	European Championships	Amsterdam, Netherlands	14th (sf)	100 m hurdles	13.05
2016	Olympic Games	Rio de Janeiro, Brazil	18th (sf)	100 m hurdles	13.04
2018	World Indoor Championships	Birmingham, United Kingdom	18th (sf)	60 m hurdles	8.20
2018	European Championships	Berlin, Germany	8th (sf)	100 m hurdles	12.94
2019	European Indoor Championships	Glasgow, United Kingdom	6th	60 m hurdles	8.09
2019	World Championships	Doha, Qatar	14th (sf)	100 m hurdles	12.89
2021	European Indoor Championships	Toruń, Poland	4th	60 m hurdles	7.93
2026	European Championships	Birmingham, United Kingdom	11th (h)	4 × 100 m relay	43.78
