= Pamela Dutkiewicz =

German hurdler (born 1991)

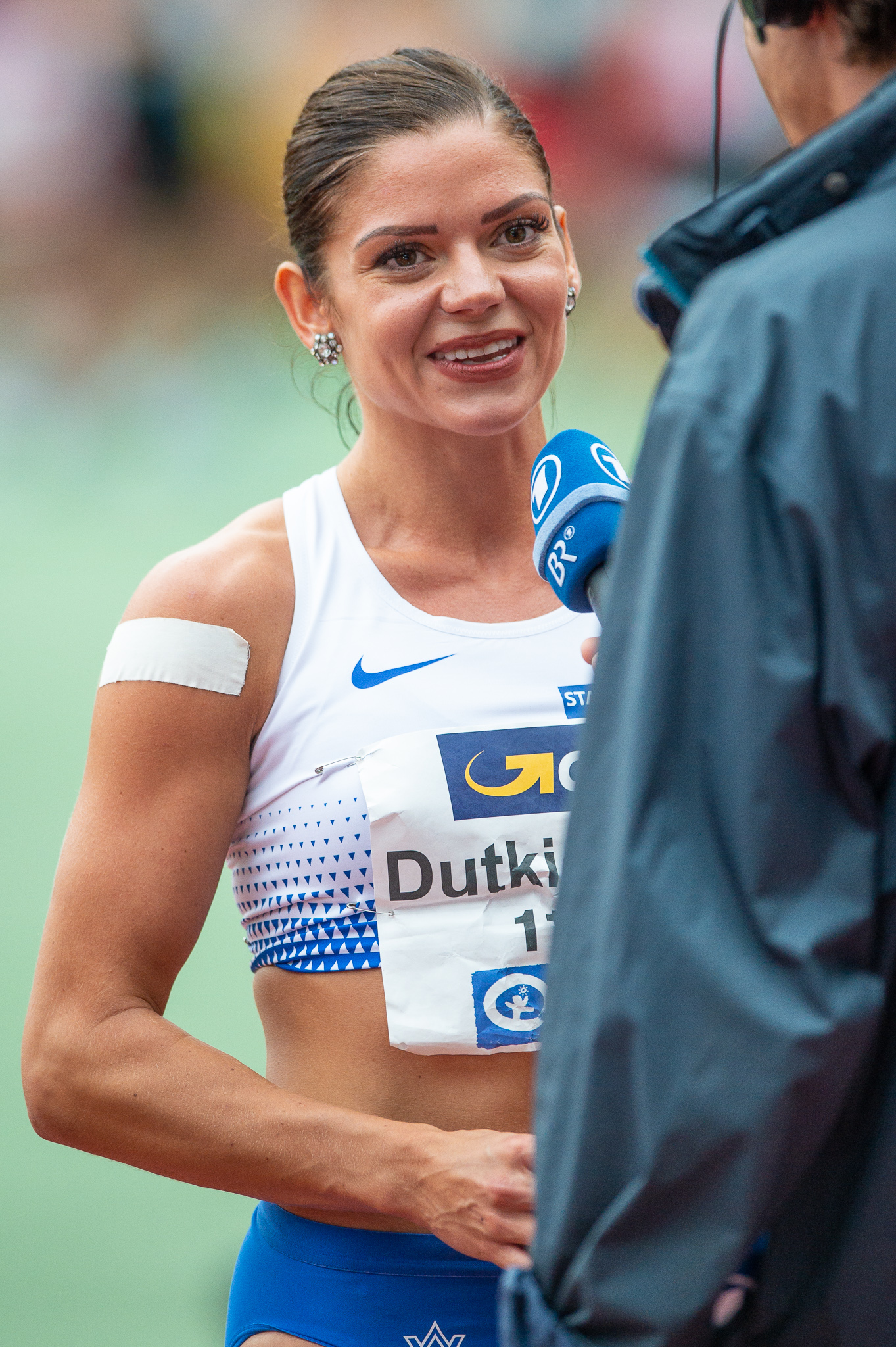
- Dutkiewicz at the 2018 German Athletics Championships

Personal information
- Nationality: German
- Born: 28 September 1991 (age 35) Kassel, Germany
- Height: 170 cm (5 ft 7 in)
- Weight: 60 kg (132 lb)

Sport
- Country: Germany
- Sport: Track and field
- Event: Hurdling
Medal record
World Championships
Bronze medal – third place	2017 London	100 m hurdles
European Championships
Silver medal – second place	2018 Berlin	100 m hurdles
European Indoor Championships
Bronze medal – third place	2017 Belgrade	60 m hurdles
Representing Europe
Continental Cup
Bronze medal – third place	2018 Ostrava	100 m hurdles

Pamela Dutkiewicz (born 28 September 1991) is a German athlete who specialises in hurdling. She qualified for the 2016 Summer Olympics where she finished 4th in her semifinal for the women's 100 m hurdles and did not advance to the final. She won the silver medal at the 2018 European Championships.

She hails from a Polish sports family. Her mother Brygida Brzęczek was an athlete who won 5 medals at the Polish athletics championships in 800 m. Her father Marian Dutkiewicz was a footballer for Olimpia Poznań and a Poland national under-21 football team.

== Personal bests ==
=== Outdoor ===
Event	Record	Wind	Venue	Date
100 metres hurdles	12.61	1.9	Weinheim	27 May 2017
100 metres hurdles (76.2 cm)	13.72	+0.2	Berlin	18 July 2008

=== Indoor ===
Event	Record	Venue	Date
60 metres hurdles	7.79	Leipzig	18 February 2017
