= Sandra Gomis =

French hurdler (born 1983)

Personal information
- Born: 21 November 1983 (age 42) Saint Nazaire, France
- Height: 165 cm (5 ft 5 in)
- Weight: 53 kg (117 lb)

Sport
- Country: France
- Sport: Athletics
- Event: 100 m hurdles
- Coached by: Ladji Doucouré
Medal record
Mediterranean Games
Silver medal – second place	2009 Pescara	100 m hurdles

Sandra Gomis (born 21 November 1983 in Saint Nazaire) is a French track and field athlete who specialises in the 100 metres hurdles.

== International competitions ==
Year	Competition	Venue	Position	Event	Notes
Representing France
2002	World Junior Championships	Kingston, Jamaica	19th (sf)	100m	12.00 (+0.3 m/s)
2002	World Junior Championships	Kingston, Jamaica	4th (h) (Note: Disqualified in the final.)	4 × 100 m relay	45.24
2009	Mediterranean Games	Pescara, Italy	2nd	100 m hurdles	13.24
2009	World Championships	Berlin, Germany	25th (h)	100 m hurdles	13.23
2011	European Indoor Championships	Paris, France	8th	60 m hurdles	8.11
2011	World Championships	Daegu, South Korea	23rd (sf)	100 m hurdles	13.55
2012	European Championships	Helsinki, Finland	26th (h)	100 m hurdles	13.63
2016	European Championships	Helsinki, Finland	9th (sf)	100 m hurdles	12.97
2016	Olympic Games	Rio de Janeiro, Brazil	20th (sf)	100 m hurdles	13.23

=== National Championships ===
- French Athletic Championships of 100m hurdles
  - 2009 (13.15s)
  - 2011 (12.93s) (+1,0 m/s)
- French Indoor Athletic Championships of 60m hurdles
  - Vice-champion of France of 60m hurdles in 2011: 8.00s
  - Vice-champion of France of 60m hurdles in 2012 with 8.10s
