= Beate Schrott =

Austrian hurdler (born 1988)

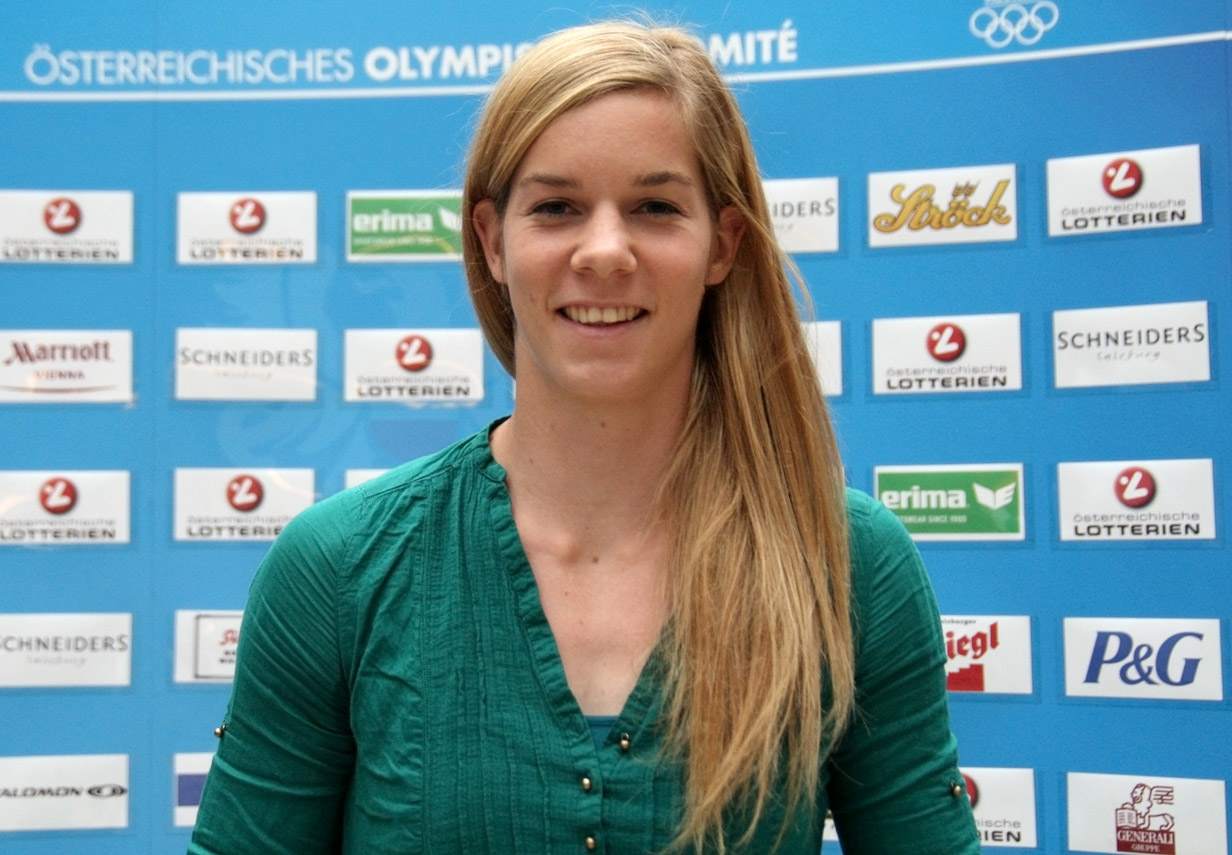
- Schrott before the 2012 Summer Olympics

Personal information
- Full name: Beate Schrott
- Born: 15 April 1988 (age 38) St. Pölten, Austria
- Height: 1.77 m (5 ft 10 in)

Sport
- Country: Austria
- Sport: Athletics
- Event: 100 m hurdles

Achievements and titles
- Personal bests: 60 m hurdles: 7.96 (Vienna, February 2013); 100 m hurdles: 12.82 (Lucerne, July 2012)
Medal record
Women's athletics
Representing Austria
European Games
Gold medal – first place	2015 Baku	Mixed team

Beate Schrott (born 15 April 1988) is an Austrian athlete who specialises in the 100 metres hurdles. She finished eighth in the 100 m hurdles at the 2012 Summer Olympics. In April 2019, Schrott became engaged to American triple jumper Christian Taylor. In November 2019 she completed a doctoral degree at the Medical University of Vienna, in autumn 2021 she married Taylor.

== Achievements ==
Year	Competition	Venue	Position	Event	Notes
Representing Austria
2006	World Junior Championships	Beijing, China	23rd (q)	Long jump	5.74 m (-0.8 m/s)
2007	European Junior Championships	Hengelo, Netherlands	16th (h)	100 m hurdles	14.16
2009	European U23 Championships	Kaunas, Lithuania	11th (sf)	100 m hurdles	13.48 (+0.3 m/s)
2010	European Championships	Barcelona, Spain	—	100 m hurdles	DSQ
2011	European Indoor Championships	Paris, France	18th (h)	60 m hurdles	8.25
2011	World Championships	Daegu, South Korea	18th (sf)	100 m hurdles	13.02
2011	Universiade	Shenzhen, China	7th	100 m hurdles	13.34
2012	World Indoor Championships	Istanbul, Turkey	7th	60 m hurdles	8.12
2012	European Championships	Helsinki, Finland	3rd	100 m hurdles	12.98
2012	Olympic Games	London, United Kingdom	8th	100 m hurdles	13.07
2014	World Indoor Championships	Sopot, Poland	26th (h)	60 m hurdles	8.24
2014	European Championships	Zürich, Switzerland	27th (h)	100 m hurdles	13.31
2015	World Championships	Beijing, China	19th (h)	100 m hurdles	13.04^{1}
2016	Olympic Games	Rio de Janeiro, Brazil	45th (h)	100 m hurdles	13.47
2018	World Indoor Championships	Birmingham, United Kingdom	27th (h)	60 m hurdles	8.27
2018	European Championships	Berlin, Germany	21st (sf)	100 m hurdles	13.23
2019	World Championships	Doha, Qatar	22nd (sf)	100 m hurdles	13.25
2021	European Indoor Championships	Toruń, Poland	20th (sf)	60 m hurdles	8.17

^{1}Did not finish in the semifinals
