= Giulia Pennella =

Italian hurdler (born 1989)

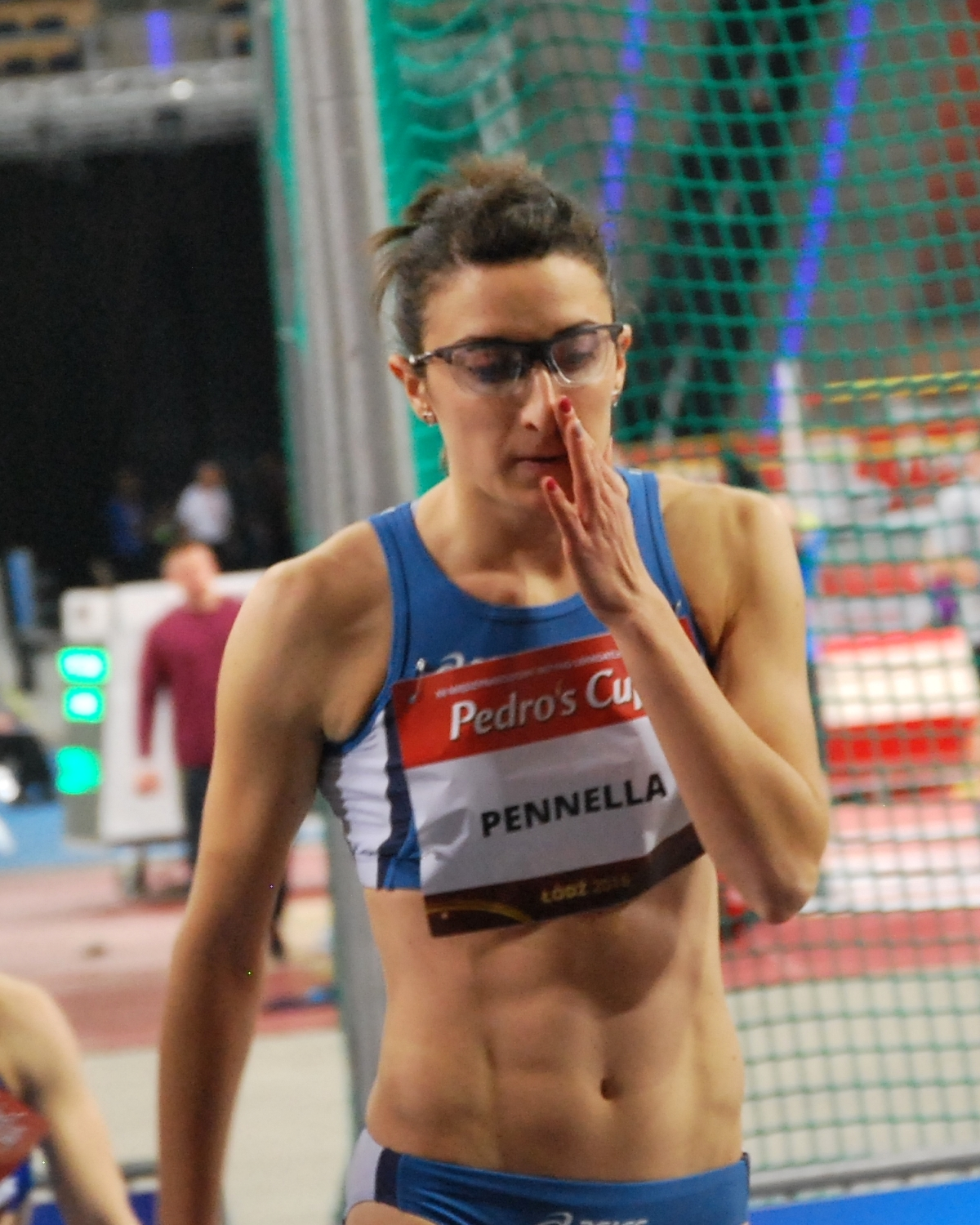

Personal information
- Nationality: Italian
- Born: 27 October 1989 (age 36) San Miniato, Italy
- Height: 1.69 m (5 ft 6 1/2 in)
- Weight: 53 kg (117 lb)

Sport
- Country: Italy
- Sport: Athletics
- Event: 100 metres hurdles
- Club: C.S. Esercito

Achievements and titles
- Personal bests: 100 m hs: 13,03 (2014); 60 m hs: 8,04 (2014)

Giulia Pennella (born 27 October 1989, in San Miniato) is an Italian hurdler.

== Biography ==
She has won four times the individual national championship. Her personal best in the 100 metres hurdles is 13.03, held on 2 July 2014 in Savona.

== Achievements ==
Year	Competition	Venue	Position	Event	Notes
Representing Italy
2008	World Junior Championships	(Poland) Bydgoszcz	23rd (h)	100m hurdles	14.14 (wind: -2.0 m/s)
2009	European U23 Championships	(Lithuania) Kaunas	23rd (h)	100m hurdles	13.85 (wind: -0.9 m/s)
2011	European Indoor Championships	(France) Paris	hest	60 m hurdles	8.25
2011	European U23 Championships	(Czech Republic) Ostrava	9th (h)	100m hurdles	13.54 (wind: -0.2 m/s)
2014	World Indoor Championships	(Poland) Sopot	hest	60 m hurdles	8.16

== National titles ==
- Italian Athletics Championships
  - 100 m hurdles: 2016
- Italian Athletics Indoor Championships
  - 60 m hurdles: 2011, 2014, 2015, 2016
