= Aïsseta Diawara =

French athlete

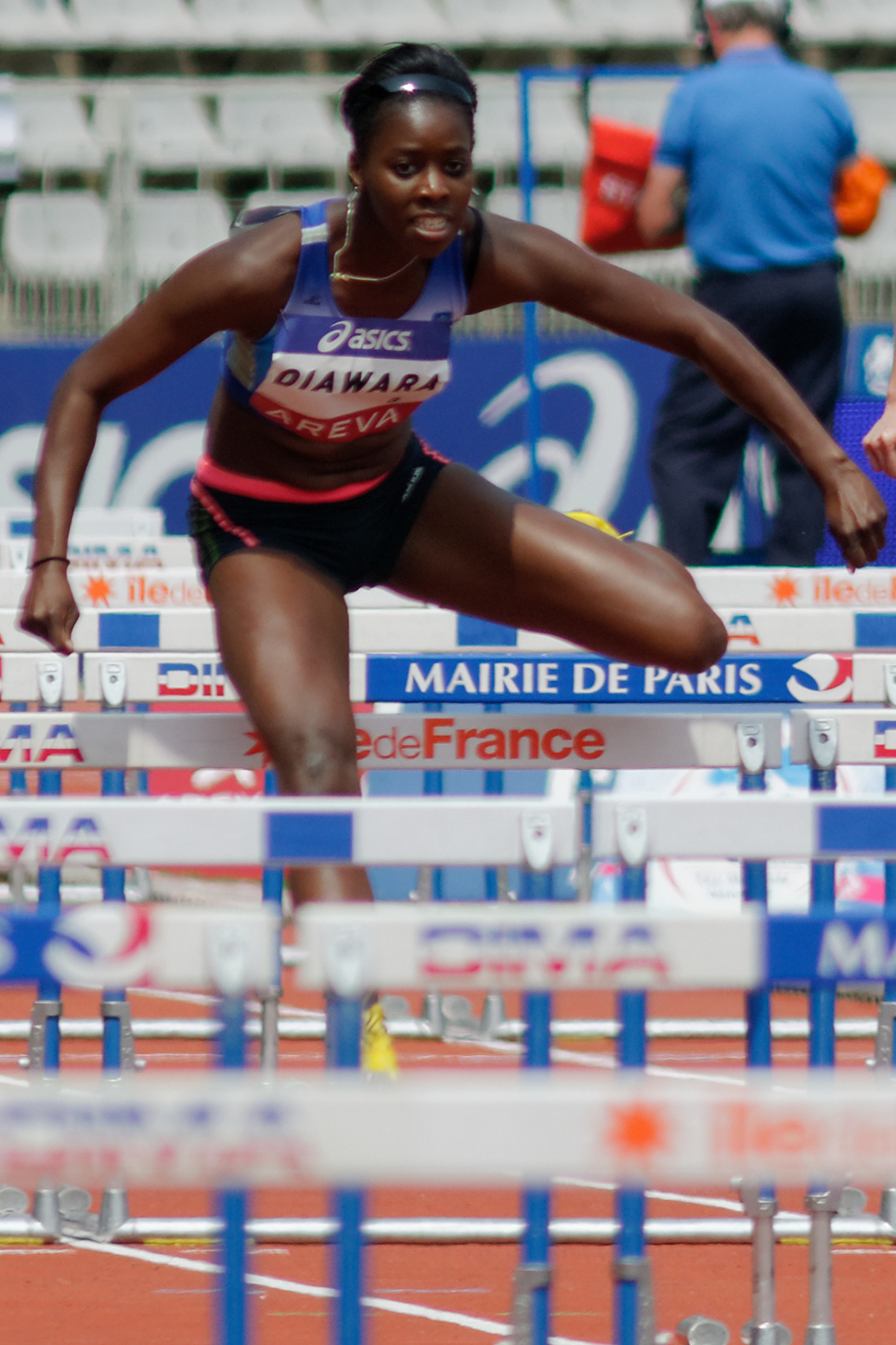
- Diawara at the 2013 French Championships

Personal information
- Born: 29 June 1989 (age 36) Paris, France
- Years active: 2010s
- Height: 169 cm (5 ft 7 in)
- Weight: 54 kg (119 lb)

Sport
- Country: France
- Sport: Athletics
- Event: 100 m hurdles
- Club: EA Saint-Quentin-en-Yvelines

Aisseta Diawara (born 29 June 1989 in Paris) is a French athlete, who specializes in the 100m hurdles.

== Biography ==
She won the 100 hurdles during the 2010 French Athletic Championships, in a time of 13.21s.

Her personal best, set in 2012 at Angers, is 12.88s.

=== Prize list ===
- French Championships in Athletics:
  - winner 100 hurdles in 2010; 2nd in 2012; 3rd in 2009 and 2014
- French Indoor Championships in Athletics:
  - 60m hurdles: 2nd in 2014

=== Records ===
Personal Bests
Event	Performance	Location	Date
100 m hurdles	12 s 88	Angers	16 June 2012
