= Elin Westerlund =

Swedish hurdler (born 1990)

Personal information
- Nationality: Swedish
- Born: 4 February 1990 (age 36) Karlskrona, Sweden

Sport
- Country: Sweden
- Sport: Track and field

Elin Anna Sofie Westerlund (born 4 February 1990) is a Swedish athlete who specialises in the 100 metres hurdles. She competed at the 2016 European Championships in Amsterdam, Netherlands. She is also in a relationship with Dutch athlete Eelco Sintnicolaas, who specialises in the multi-events (decathlon).

== Personal bests ==
=== Outdoor ===
Event	Record	Wind	Venue	Date
100 metres hurdles	13.11	+1.0	Sollentuna	28 June 2016
Long jump	5.94	-0.1	Karlskrona	18 June 2007

=== Indoor ===
Event	Record	Venue	Date
60 metres hurdles	8.27	Malmö	28 February 2016
