= Marzia Caravelli =

Italian hurdler (born 1981)

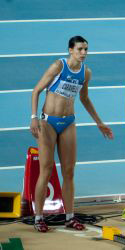
- Caravelli at the 2012 World Indoor Championships.

Personal information
- Nationality: Italian
- Born: 23 October 1981 (age 44) Pordenone, Italy
- Height: 1.76 m (5 ft 9 1/2 in)
- Weight: 64 kg (141 lb)

Sport
- Country: Italy
- Sport: Athletics
- Event: 100 metres hurdles
- Club: CUS Cagliari
- Coached by: Marcello Ambrogi

Achievements and titles
- Personal bests: 60 m hs: 7.97 (2014); 100 m hs: 12.85 (2012); 400 m hs: 55.69 (2016)
Medal record
Mediterranean Games
Gold medal – first place	2013 Mersin	100 metres hs
European Team Championships
Bronze medal – third place	Stockholm 2011	100 metres hs

Marzia Caravelli (born 23 October 1981 in Pordenone) is an Italian hurdler.

== Biography ==
She was 3rd at the 2011 European Team Championships in Stockholm. Her 100 metres hurdles personal best is 12"85 set in Montgeron on 13 May 2012.

In 2005 Marzia Caravelli made her debut for the Italian national team, but she was a late developer in sporting terms and begun to get good results at international level in 2010 at the age of 29. Despite reaching the semi-finals at the 2012 Summer Olympics in London, she has not succeeded in convincing the national federation to allow her to become a member of the Italian military sports bodies.

== Progression ==
100 metres hurdles

Year	Performance	Venue	Date	World Ranking
2013	12.95	(Switzerland) Bellinzona	11 June	21st
2012	12.85	(France) Montgeron	13 May	41st
2011	13.01	(Italy) Arzana	30 July	53rd
2011	13.01	(Italy) Pergine Valsugana	23 July	53rd
2010	13.10	(Norway) Bergen	20 June	56th
2009	13.42	(Italy) Milan	1 August	
2008	13.41	(Italy) Rieti	10 August	
2007	13.57	(United Kingdom) Loughborough	12 August	

== Achievements ==
Year	Competition	Venue	Position	Event	Time	Notes
2012	Olympic Games	(United Kingdom) London	SF	100 metres hs	DNF	
2013	Mediterranean Games	(Turkey) Mersin	1st	100 metres hs	12.98	
2013	World Championships	(Russia) Moscow	SF	100 metres hs	13.06	

== National titles ==
She has won 7 times the individual national championship.

- 1 win in the 60 metres hurdles indoor (2010)
- 4 wins in the 100 metres hurdles (2010, 2011, 2012, 2013)
- 2 wins in the 200 metres (2011, 2013)

== See also ==
- Italian all-time lists - 100 metres hurdles
- Italian all-time lists - 4×100 metres relay
