= Eline Berings =

Belgian hurdler

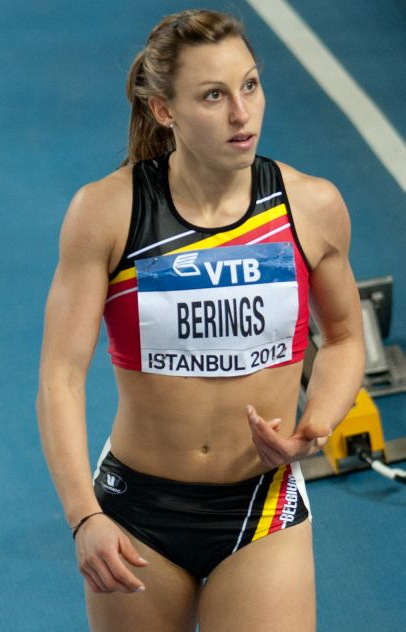
- Berings at the 2012 World Indoor Championships .

Personal information
- Full name: Eline Berings
- Born: 28 May 1986 (age 40) Ghent, Belgium
- Years active: 2000-present
- Height: 1.62 m (5 ft 4 in)
- Weight: 53 kg (117 lb)

Achievements and titles
- Personal best(s): 100m - 11.77 (2007); 100m hurdles - 12.72 (2018); 60m - 7.39 (2010); 60m hurdles - 7.92 (2009)
Medal record
Representing Belgium
Women's athletics
European Indoor Championships
| Gold medal – first place | 2009 Turin | 60 m hurdles |
European Junior Championships
| Gold medal – first place | 2005 Kaunas | 100 m hurdles |
- Updated on 28 April 2010

Eline Berings (born 28 May 1986) is a Belgian retired athlete, who competed in the 100 m hurdles. She is the 2005 European junior champion, and took her first medal as a senior by winning the 2009 European Indoor Championships. Her personal best times are 12.72 and 7.92 in the 100 and 60 m hurdles respectively.

As of the 2023 World Athletics Championships she works as athletics commentator for the TV broadcasts of Belgian sports program Sporza.

== Biography ==
=== Junior career ===
Berings was born in Ghent. As a junior athlete she finished seventh at the 2003 World Youth Championships, failed to reach the final at the 2004 World Junior Championships, and won the gold medal at the 2005 European Junior Championships. Her personal best time in 2005, her last year as a junior, was 13.39 seconds, achieved in July 2005 in Oordegem.

=== Senior career ===
In the 2005–06 indoor season, she lowered her personal best time in the 60 m hurdles from 8.48 to 8.17 seconds, in a meet in February in Ghent. In the summer she competed in the 2006 European Championships, but with a time of 13.42 seconds in the heat, she did not progress from the first round. In Oordegem during May, she had lowered her personal best time to 13.27 seconds. In the 2006–07 indoor season, she ran the 60 m hurdles in 8.07 seconds in February. Three weeks later, she competed at the 2007 European Indoor Championships, where she achieved the same time in the initial rounds. She reached the final for the first time in a senior championships, and finished eighth. In the summer she competed at the 2007 World Championships in Athletics. She did not progress from the first round, but the time of 12.97 seconds was a new personal best.

Her next major event was the 2008 World Indoor Championships. Here, she achieved another personal best time of 8.05 seconds in the heats, but with 8.10 in the semi-final, she was knocked out. She performed slightly worse during the summer, with 13.09 seconds in July in Heusden-Zolder as the season's best. In the 2008–09 indoor season, she returned to form as she competed at the 2009 European Indoor Championships. After 8.00 in the heats and 8.01 in the semi-final, she took the gold medal ahead of Lucie Škrobáková, 2006 World Indoor Champion Derval O'Rourke and Christina Vukicevic. Her time of 7.92 seconds was a new national indoor record.

She was a semi-finalist in the 60 m hurdles at the 2010 IAAF World Indoor Championships, but failed to progress beyond the heats stage at the 2010 European Athletics Championships later that year. A knee injury and a serious muscle tear in her thigh brought a premature end to her 2011 season, as she missed out on defending her European indoor title.

She competed at the 2012 Summer Olympics in the 100 m hurdles, reaching the semi-finals.

At the 2014 European Championships, she reached the final, finishing in 8th place.

== Personal life ==
Berings studied psychology. Following the end of her competitive athletic career, she began working as a sports psychologist, advising athletes such as Belgian figure skating champion Loena Hendrickx.
