= Athletics at the 2019 Summer Universiade – Women's 100 metres hurdles =

The women's 100 metres hurdles event at the 2019 Summer Universiade was held on 10 and 11 July at the Stadio San Paolo in Naples.

== Medalists ==
| Gold | Silver | Bronze |
|---|---|---|
| Luminosa Bogliolo; Italy | Reetta Hurske; Finland | Coralie Comte; France |

== Results ==
=== Heats ===
Qualification: First 3 in each heat (Q) and next 4 fastest (q) qualified for the semifinals.

Wind:
Heat 1: +2.8 m/s, Heat 2: -1.4 m/s, Heat 3: -0.5 m/s, Heat 4: +1.8 m/s

| Rank | Heat | Name | Nationality | Time | Notes |
|---|---|---|---|---|---|
| 1 | 4 | Reetta Hurske | Finland | 13.11 | Q |
| 2 | 4 | Sarah Lavin | Ireland | 13.32 | Q, SB |
| 3 | 4 | Joy Spearchief-Morris | Canada | 13.36 | Q |
| 4 | 3 | Luminosa Bogliolo | Italy | 13.36 | Q |
| 5 | 4 | Nataliia Yurchuk | Ukraine | 13.40 | q, PB |
| 6 | 1 | Coralie Comte | France | 13.41 | Q |
| 7 | 4 | Abbie Taddeo | Australia | 13.49 | q |
| 8 | 3 | Hanna Chubkovtsova | Ukraine | 13.50 | Q |
| 9 | 1 | Jessica Hunter | Great Britain | 13.51 | Q |
| 10 | 1 | Keira Christie-Galloway | Canada | 13.53 | Q |
| 11 | 3 | Mette Graversgaard | Denmark | 13.61 | Q |
| 12 | 1 | Lucie Koudelová | Czech Republic | 13.63 | q |
| 13 | 2 | Lui Lai Yiu | Hong Kong | 13.70 | Q |
| 14 | 4 | Sarah Missinne | Belgium | 13.70 | q |
| 15 | 1 | Mathilde Heltbeck | Denmark | 13.72 | |
| 16 | 3 | Hsieh Hsi-en | Chinese Taipei | 13.73 | |
| 17 | 2 | Silvia Taini | Italy | 13.81 | Q |
| 18 | 3 | Helena Jiranová | Czech Republic | 13.83 | |
| 19 | 2 | Stanislava Lajčáková | Slovakia | 13.92 | Q |
| 20 | 2 | Celeste Mucci | Australia | 14.03 | |
| 21 | 1 | Emilia Nova | Indonesia | 14.19 | |
| 22 | 2 | S. Pushpanjali | India | 14.34 | |
| 23 | 2 | Cheng Tang-hsiu | Chinese Taipei | 14.68 | |
| 24 | 4 | Ken Ayuthaya Purnama | Indonesia | 14.70 | |
| 25 | 3 | Oryngul Zkriyenova | Kazakhstan | 15.26 | |
| | 3 | Rama Cisse | Senegal | DQ | R162.7 |

=== Semifinals ===
Qualification: First 3 in each heat (Q) and next 2 fastest (q) qualified for the final.

Wind:
Heat 1: -0.2 m/s, Heat 2: -0.6 m/s

| Rank | Heat | Name | Nationality | Time | Notes |
|---|---|---|---|---|---|
| 1 | 1 | Luminosa Bogliolo | Italy | 12.86 | Q, PB |
| 2 | 2 | Reetta Hurske | Finland | 13.17 | Q |
| 3 | 2 | Joy Spearchief-Morris | Canada | 13.24 | Q |
| 4 | 1 | Coralie Comte | France | 13.24 | Q |
| 5 | 2 | Sarah Lavin | Ireland | 13.26 | Q, SB |
| 6 | 1 | Hanna Chubkovtsova | Ukraine | 13.41 | Q |
| 7 | 1 | Abbie Taddeo | Australia | 13.42 | q |
| 8 | 2 | Stanislava Lajčáková | Slovakia | 13.46 | q |
| 9 | 1 | Keira Christie-Galloway | Canada | 13.46 | |
| 10 | 2 | Lui Lai Yiu | Hong Kong | 13.52 | |
| 11 | 1 | Jessica Hunter | Great Britain | 13.53 | |
| 12 | 2 | Nataliia Yurchuk | Ukraine | 13.55 | |
| 13 | 1 | Lucie Koudelová | Czech Republic | 13.64 | |
| 14 | 2 | Silvia Taini | Italy | 13.69 | |
| 15 | 2 | Sarah Missinne | Belgium | 13.69 | |
| 16 | 1 | Mette Graversgaard | Denmark | 13.76 | |

=== Final ===
Official Video

Wind: +0.6 m/s

| Rank | Lane | Name | Nationality | Time | Notes |
|---|---|---|---|---|---|
| 1st place, gold medalist(s) | 4 | Luminosa Bogliolo | Italy | 12.79 | PB |
| 2nd place, silver medalist(s) | 3 | Reetta Hurske | Finland | 13.02 | |
| 3rd place, bronze medalist(s) | 6 | Coralie Comte | France | 13.09 | PB |
| 4 | 8 | Sarah Lavin | Ireland | 13.28 | SB |
| 5 | 5 | Joy Spearchief-Morris | Canada | 13.34 | |
| 6 | 7 | Hanna Chubkovtsova | Ukraine | 13.47 | |
| 7 | 2 | Stanislava Lajčáková | Slovakia | 13.54 | |
| 8 | 1 | Abbie Taddeo | Australia | 13.68 | |
