= 2023 European Athletics Indoor Championships – Women's 60 metres hurdles =

Women's 60 metres hurdles at the 2023 European Athletics Indoor Championships
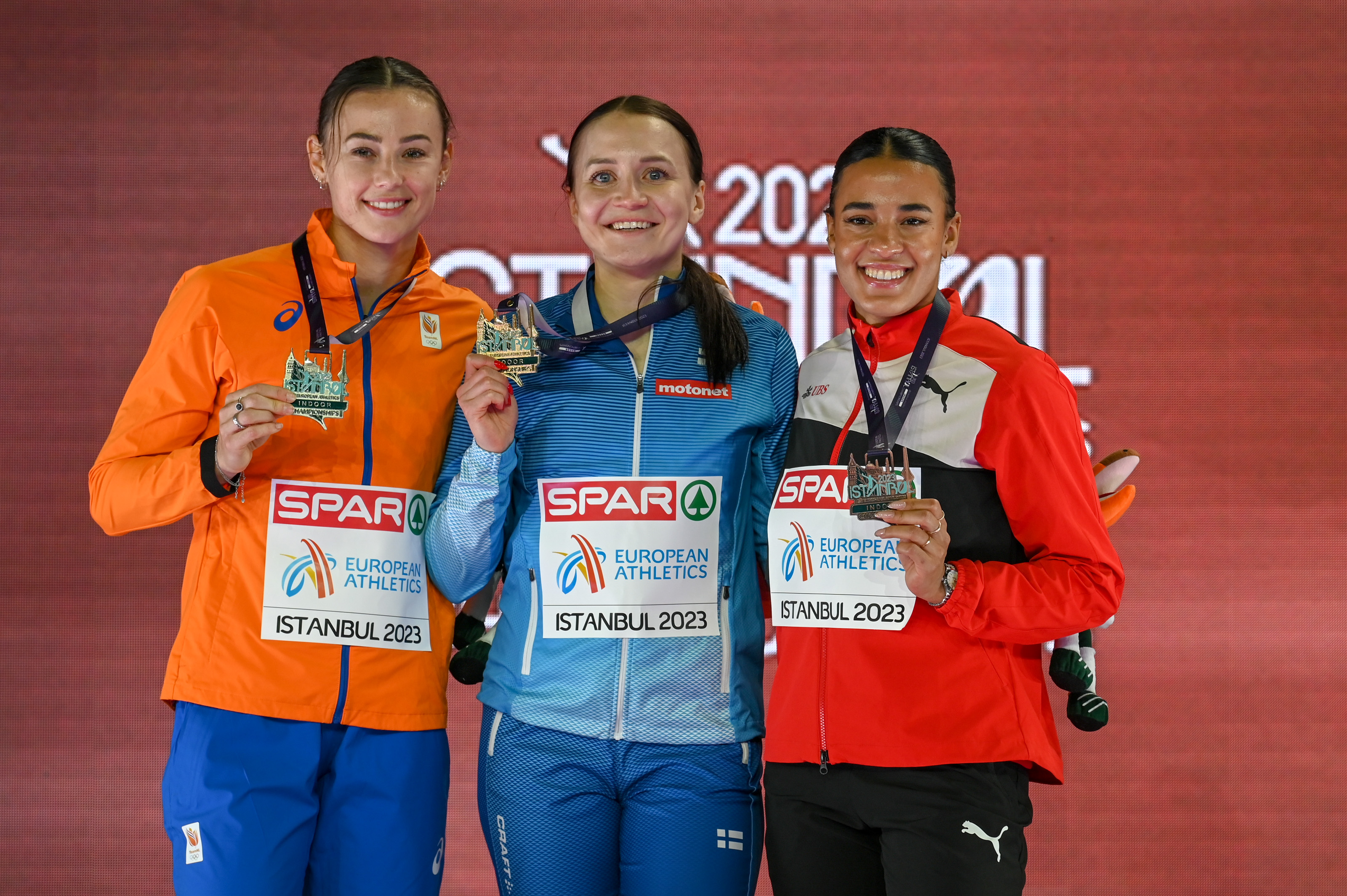
- The medalists.
- Venue: Ataköy Athletics Arena
- Location: Istanbul, Turkey
- Dates: 4 March 2023 (round 1); 5 March 2023 (semi-finals and final)
- Competitors: 31 from 21 nations
- Winning time: 7.79 =NR

Medalists
gold medal	Reetta Hurske	Finland
silver medal	Nadine Visser	Netherlands
bronze medal	Ditaji Kambundji	Switzerland

The women's 60 metres hurdles event at the 2023 European Athletics Indoor Championships was held on 4 March 2023 at 10:35 (heats) and on 5 March 2023 10:55 (semi-finals), at 20:55 (final) local time.

== Records ==
Standing records prior to the 2023 European Athletics Indoor Championships
World record	Susanna Kallur (SWE)	7.68	Karlsruhe, Germany	10 February 2008
European record	Susanna Kallur (SWE)	7.68	Karlsruhe, Germany	10 February 2008
Championship record	Lyudmila Narozhilenko (URS)	7.74	Glasgow, United Kingdom	4 March 1990
World Leading	Masai Russell (USA)	7.77	Fayetteville, United States	25 February 2023
European Leading	Pia Skrzyszowska (POL)	7.78	Łódź, Poland	4 February 2023

== Results ==
=== Heats ===
Qualification: First 3 in each heat (Q) and the next fastest 4 (q) advance to the Semifinals.

Rank	Heat	Athlete	Nationality	Time	Note
1	1	Nadine Visser	Netherlands	7.88	Q
2	3	Reetta Hurske	Finland	7.93	Q
3	3	Mette Graversgaard	Denmark	7.96	Q, NR
4	1	Laëticia Bapté	France	7.97	Q
5	2	Cyréna Samba-Mayela	France	7.99	Q
6	4	Ditaji Kambundji	Switzerland	8.02	Q
6	4	Sarah Lavin	Ireland	8.03	Q
8	3	Judy Chalcou	France	8.03	Q
9	2	Maayke Tjin-A-Lim	Netherlands	8.03	Q
10	1	Gréta Kerekes	Hungary	8.04	Q
11	2	Natalia Christofi	Cyprus	8.08	Q
12	4	Zoë Sedney	Netherlands	8.08	Q
13	2	Weronika Nagięć	Poland	8.09	q
14	4	Elisa Di Lazzaro	Italy	8.10	q
15	1	Anne Zagré	Belgium	8.13	q
16	2	Annimari Korte	Finland	8.14	q
17	2	Mathilde Heltbech	Denmark	8.15	SB
18	4	Lotta Harala	Finland	8.17	
19	1	Xènia Benach	Spain	8.17	
20	1	Monika Zapalska	Germany	8.19	
21	2	Anna Tóth	Hungary	8.20	
22	4	Olimpia Barbosa	Portugal	8.21	
23	3	Andrea Rooth	Norway	8.21	
24	4	Anja Lukić	Serbia	8.23	
25	1	Victoria Rausch	Luxembourg	8.23	
26	3	Viktória Forster	Slovakia	8.24	
27	3	Anna Plotitsyna	Ukraine	8.26	
28	3	Nicla Mosetti	Italy	8.30	
29	2	Anais Karagianni	Greece	8.34	
30	1	Joni Tomičić Prezelj	Slovenia	9.22	
	4	Elisavet Pesiridou	Greece	DNS	

=== Semifinals ===
Qualification: First 4 in each heat (Q) advance to the Final.

Rank	Heat	Athlete	Nationality	Time	Note
1	2	Reetta Hurske	Finland	7.85	Q
2	2	Laëticia Bapté	France	7.91	Q
3	1	Nadine Visser	Netherlands	7.93	Q
4	1	Mette Graversgaard	Denmark	7.94	Q, NR
5	1	Ditaji Kambundji	Switzerland	7.97	Q
6	2	Sarah Lavin	Ireland	7.99	Q
7	2	Gréta Kerekes	Hungary	8.00	Q, PB
8	2	Cyréna Samba-Mayela	France	8.00	
9	1	Maayke Tjin-A-Lim	Netherlands	8.02	Q
10	2	Zoë Sedney	Netherlands	8.06	
11	2	Elisa Di Lazzaro	Italy	8.06	
12	2	Anne Zagré	Belgium	8.08	SB
13	1	Annimari Korte	Finland	8.13	
14	1	Weronika Nagięć	Poland	8.15	
	1	Judy Chalcou	France	DNS	
	1	Natalia Christofi	Cyprus	DNS	

=== Final ===
Rank	Heat	Athlete	Nationality	Time	Note
1st place, gold medalist(s)	5	Reetta Hurske	Finland	7.79	=NR
2nd place, silver medalist(s)	4	Nadine Visser	Netherlands	7.84	SB
3rd place, bronze medalist(s)	7	Ditaji Kambundji	Switzerland	7.91	
4	6	Mette Graversgaard	Denmark	7.92	NR
5	3	Laëticia Bapté	France	7.97	
6	8	Sarah Lavin	Ireland	8.03	
7	1	Gréta Kerekes	Hungary	8.03	
8	2	Maayke Tjin-A-Lim	Netherlands	8.09	
