= 2022 European Athletics Championships – Women's 100 metres hurdles =

Women's 100 metres hurdles at the 2022 European Athletics Championships
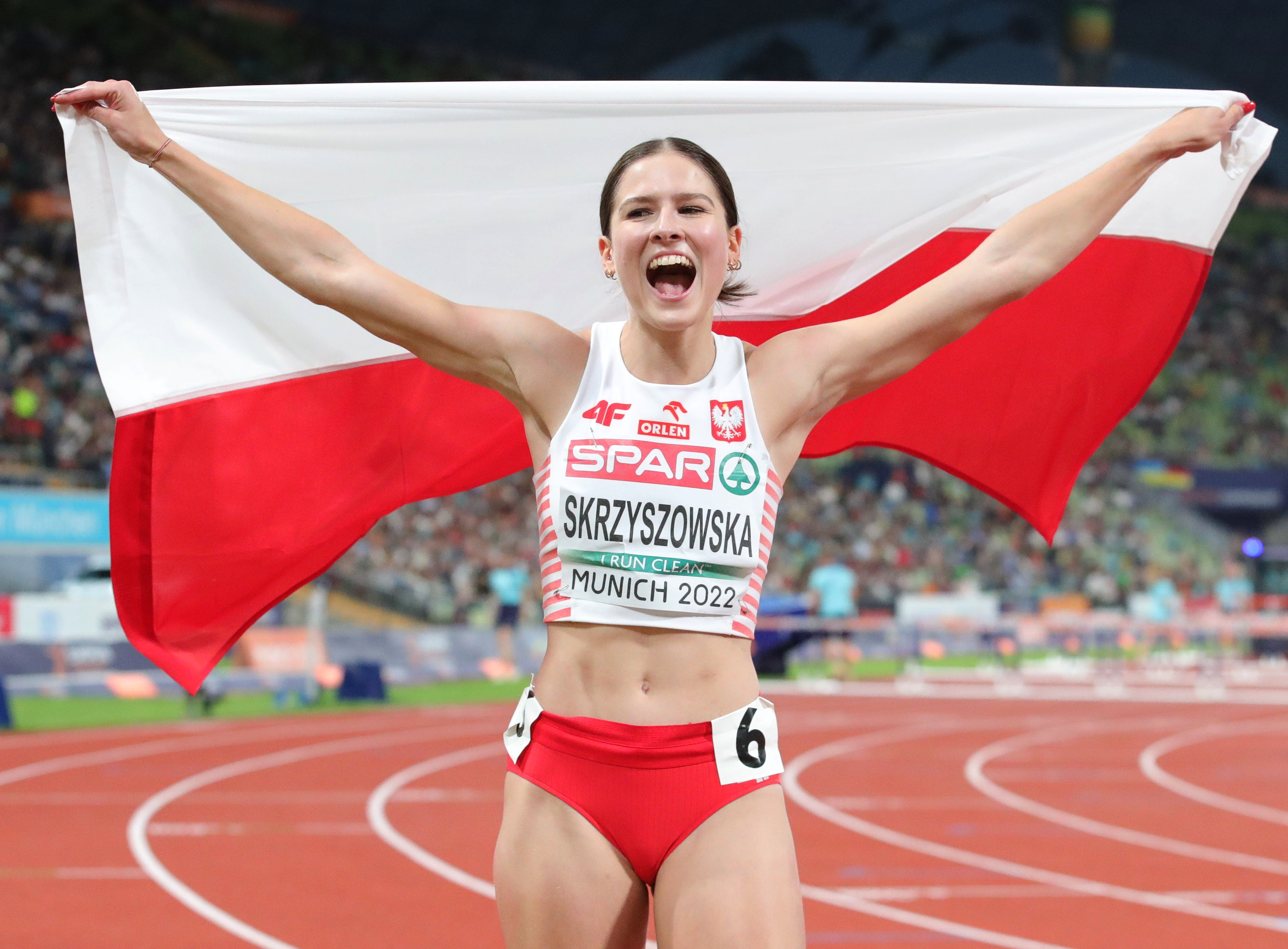
- Venue: Olympiastadion
- Location: Munich
- Dates: 20 August (round 1); 21 August (semifinals and final)
- Competitors: 34 from 24 nations
- Winning time: 12.53

Medalists
gold medal	Pia Skrzyszowska	Poland
silver medal	Luca Kozák	Hungary
bronze medal	Ditaji Kambundji	Switzerland

The women's 100 metres hurdles at the 2022 European Athletics Championships took place at the Olympiastadion on 20 and 21 August.

== Records ==
Standing records prior to the 2022 European Athletics Championships
World record	Tobi Amusan (NGR)	12.12	Eugene, Oregon, United States	24 July 2022
European record	Yordanka Donkova (BUL)	12.21	Stara Zagora, Bulgaria	20 August 1988
Championship record	Yordanka Donkova (BUL)	12.38	Stuttgart, West Germany	29 August 1986
World Leading	Tobi Amusan (NGR)	12.12	Eugene, Oregon, United States	24 July 2022
Europe Leading	Cindy Sember (GBR)	12.50	Eugene, Oregon, United States	24 July 2022

== Schedule ==
Date	Time	Round
20 August 2022	20:43	Round 1
21 August 2022	19:10	Semifinals
21 August 2022	20:45	Final

All times are local times (UTC+2)

== Results ==
=== Round 1 ===
First 3 in each heat (Q) and the next 3 fastest (q) advanced to the semifinals.The 12 highest ranked athletes received a bye into the semifinals.

Rank	Heat	Lane	Name	Nationality	Time	Note
1	3	2	Elisa Maria Di Lazzaro	Italy	13.11	Q
2	2	4	Anne Zagré	Belgium	13.12	Q
3	3	4	Viktória Forster	Slovakia	13.19	Q
4	2	7	Maayke Tjin-A-Lim	Netherlands	13.26	Q
4	3	3	Xènia Benach	Spain	13.26	Q
6	1	5	Jessica Hunter	Great Britain	13.27	Q
7	3	8	Olimpia Barbosa	Portugal	13.29	q
8	1	2	Laura Valette	France	13.30	Q
9	2	6	Elisavet Pesiridou	Greece	13.33	Q
10	3	5	Noemi Zbären	Switzerland	13.34	q
11	3	1	Victoria Rausch	Luxembourg	13.37	q
12	2	2	Monika Zapalska	Germany	13.39	
13	1	8	Klaudia Wojtunik	Poland	13.40	Q
14	2	5	Mathilde Heltbech	Denmark	13.41	
15	2	3	Nicla Mosetti	Italy	13.49	
16	3	6	Ivana Lončarek	Croatia	13.50	
17	1	7	Helena Jiranová	Czech Republic	13.50	
18	1	3	Natalia Christofi	Cyprus	13.53	
19	2	8	Anja Lukić	Serbia	13.63	
20	1	4	Anna Plotitsyna	Ukraine	13.66	
21	1	1	Joni Tomičič Prezelj	Slovenia	13.68	
	3	7	Andrea Rooth	Norway	DQ	TR16.8
	1	6	Luminosa Bogliolo	Italy	DNS	

=== Semifinals ===
First 2 in each semifinal (Q) and the next 2 fastest (q) advanced to the Final.

Rank	Heat	Lane	Name	Nationality	Time	Note
1	3	5	Cindy Sember	Great Britain	12.62	Q
2	2	5	Pia Skrzyszowska	Poland	12.66	Q
3	2	4	Luca Kozák	Hungary	12.69	Q, NR
4	1	5	Nadine Visser	Netherlands	12.74	Q
5	1	4	Ditaji Kambundji	Switzerland	12.78	Q
6	2	3	Sarah Lavin	Ireland	12.79	q, PB
7	3	4	Cyréna Samba-Mayela	France	12.82	Q
8	1	6	Mette Graversgaard	Denmark	12.87	q
9	3	3	Reetta Hurske	Finland	12.95	
10	1	3	Klaudia Siciarz	Poland	13.00	
11	3	1	Klaudia Wojtunik	Poland	13.03	SB
12	1	8	Elisa Maria Di Lazzaro	Italy	13.11	
13	3	6	Anne Zagré	Belgium	13.12	
14	2	8	Noemi Zbären	Switzerland	13.15	
15	2	6	Laëticia Bapté	France	13.16	
16	3	7	Xènia Benach	Spain	13.18	
17	1	2	Elisavet Pesiridou	Greece	13.19	
18	1	7	Laura Valette	France	13.20	
19	2	7	Maayke Tjin-A-Lim	Netherlands	13.21	
20	2	1	Victoria Rausch	Luxembourg	13.33	
21	3	8	Zoë Sedney	Netherlands	13.42	
22	2	2	Jessica Hunter	Great Britain	13.43	
23	1	1	Viktória Forster	Slovakia	13.50	
24	3	2	Olimpia Barbosa	Portugal	13.57	

=== Final ===
Rank	Lane	Name	Nationality	Time	Note
1st place, gold medalist(s)	6	Pia Skrzyszowska	Poland	12.53	
2nd place, silver medalist(s)	5	Luca Kozák	Hungary	12.69	=NR
3rd place, bronze medalist(s)	8	Ditaji Kambundji	Switzerland	12.74	
4	4	Nadine Visser	Netherlands	12.75	
5	1	Sarah Lavin	Ireland	12.86	
6	2	Mette Graversgaard	Denmark	12.99	
7	7	Cyréna Samba-Mayela	France	13.05	
8	3	Cindy Sember	Great Britain	13.16	
