= 2021 European Athletics Indoor Championships – Women's 60 metres hurdles =

The women's 60 metres hurdles event at the 2021 European Athletics Indoor Championships was held on 6 March 2021 at 12:10 (heats) and on 7 March 2021 13:30 (semi-finals), at 17:15 (final) local time.

== Medalists ==
Gold	Silver	Bronze
Nadine Visser; Netherlands	Cindy Sember; Great Britain	Tiffany Porter; Great Britain

== Records ==
Standing records prior to the 2021 European Athletics Indoor Championships
World record	Susanna Kallur (SWE)	7.68	Karlsruhe, Germany	10 February 2008
European record	Susanna Kallur (SWE)	7.68	Karlsruhe, Germany	10 February 2008
Championship record	Lyudmila Narozhilenko (URS)	7.74	Glasgow, United Kingdom	4 March 1990
World Leading	Christina Clemons (USA)	7.81	Toruń, Poland	17 February 2021
World Leading	Nadine Visser (NED)	7.81	Madrid, Spain	24 February 2021
European Leading	Nadine Visser (NED)	7.81	Madrid, Spain	24 February 2021

== Results ==
=== Heats ===
Qualification: First 3 in each heat (Q) and the next fastest 6 (q) advance to the Semifinals.

Rank	Heat	Athlete	Nationality	Time	Note
1	5	Nadine Visser	Netherlands	7.92	Q
2	3	Pia Skrzyszowska	Poland	7.96	Q, PB
3	6	Karolina Kołeczek	Poland	7.98	Q
4	1	Elvira Herman	Belarus	7.99	Q
5	5	Cindy Sember	Great Britain	7.99	Q, SB
6	4	Luminosa Bogliolo	Italy	8.01	Q
6	1	Zoë Sedney	Netherlands	8.01	Q
8	4	Nooralotta Neziri	Finland	8.03	Q
9	2	Luca Kozák	Hungary	8.04	Q
10	2	Tiffany Porter	Great Britain	8.04	Q
11	3	Ditaji Kambundji	Switzerland	8.05	Q, EU20L
12	2	Anne Zagré	Belgium	8.06	Q
13	5	Sarah Lavin	Ireland	8.06	Q, PB
14	1	Teresa Errandonea	Spain	8.09	Q
15	5	Sviatlana Parakhonka	Belarus	8.10	q
16	3	Laeticia Bapte	France	8.11	Q
17	1	Elisa Di Lazzaro	Italy	8.13	q, PB
18	4	Markéta Štolová	Czech Republic	8.14	Q
19	3	Karin Strametz	Austria	8.17	q, PB
20	2	Beate Schrott	Austria	8.19	q
21	3	Eline Berings	Belgium	8.19	q
22	6	Noemi Zbären	Switzerland	8.20	Q
23	2	Helena Jiranová	Czech Republic	8.21	q, =SB
24	6	Stanislava Škvarková	Slovakia	8.21	Q
25	1	Gréta Kerekes	Hungary	8.21	
26	2	Hanna Plotitsyna	Ukraine	8.22	
27	6	Xenia Benach	Spain	8.22	
28	6	Cyréna Samba-Mayela	France	8.22	
29	4	Kreete Verlin	Estonia	8.24	
30	4	Emma Nwofor	Great Britain	8.24	
31	1	Ivana Lončarek	Croatia	8.26	
32	6	Julia Wennersten	Sweden	8.27	
33	6	Diana Suumann	Estonia	8.27	
34	6	Klara Koščak	Croatia	8.27	
35	4	Caridad Jerez	Spain	8.29	
36	5	Anja Lukić	Serbia	8.29	
37	3	Hanna Chubkovtsova	Ukraine	8.30	
38	3	Elisavet Pesiridou	Greece	8.31	SB
39	5	Anastasiya Mokhnyuk	Ukraine	8.34	
40	1	Selina von Jackowski	Switzerland	8.36	
	2	Mette Graversgaard	Denmark	DNF	
	4	Ruslana Rashkovan	Belarus	DNF	
	5	Anamaria Nesteriuc	Romania	DSQ	R16.7.1
	3	Anni Siirtola	Finland	DSQ	R16.7.1

=== Semifinals ===
Qualification: First 2 in each heat (Q) and the next 2 fastest (q) advance to the Final.

Rank	Heat	Athlete	Nationality	Time	Note
1	2	Nadine Visser	Netherlands	7.86	Q
2	3	Pia Skrzyszowska	Poland	7.88	Q, PB
3	2	Cindy Sember	Great Britain	7.89	Q, =PB
4	1	Nooralotta Neziri	Finland	7.97	Q
5	1	Tiffany Porter	Great Britain	7.98	Q
6	2	Luca Kozák	Hungary	7.98	q, SB
7	3	Luminosa Bogliolo	Italy	7.99	Q, PB
7	3	Zoë Sedney	Netherlands	7.99	q
9	3	Sarah Lavin	Ireland	8.07	
10	1	Elvira Herman	Belarus	8.07	
11	3	Ditaji Kambundji	Switzerland	8.07	
12	2	Anne Zagré	Belgium	8.08	
13	1	Teresa Errandonea	Spain	8.10	
14	1	Karolina Kołeczek	Poland	8.12	
15	1	Elisa Di Lazzaro	Italy	8.12	PB
16	1	Laeticia Bapte	France	8.13	
17	1	Karin Strametz	Austria	8.13	PB
18	2	Sviatlana Parakhonka	Belarus	8.15	
19	2	Noemi Zbären	Switzerland	8.15	
20	3	Beate Schrott	Austria	8.17	=SB
21	3	Markéta Štolová	Czech Republic	8.20	
22	2	Stanislava Škvarková	Slovakia	8.23	
23	2	Helena Jiranová	Czech Republic	8.25	
	3	Eline Berings	Belgium	DNS	

=== Final ===
Rank	Lane	Athlete	Nationality	Time	Note
1st place, gold medalist(s)	5	Nadine Visser	Netherlands	7.77	WL, NR
2nd place, silver medalist(s)	6	Cindy Sember	Great Britain	7.89	
3rd place, bronze medalist(s)	8	Tiffany Porter	Great Britain	7.92	
4	3	Nooralotta Neziri	Finland	7.93	
5	4	Pia Skrzyszowska	Poland	7.95	
6	7	Luminosa Bogliolo	Italy	7.99	=PB
7	2	Zoë Sedney	Netherlands	8.00	
8	1	Luca Kozák	Hungary	8.01	
