= Anne Zagré =

Belgian sprinter

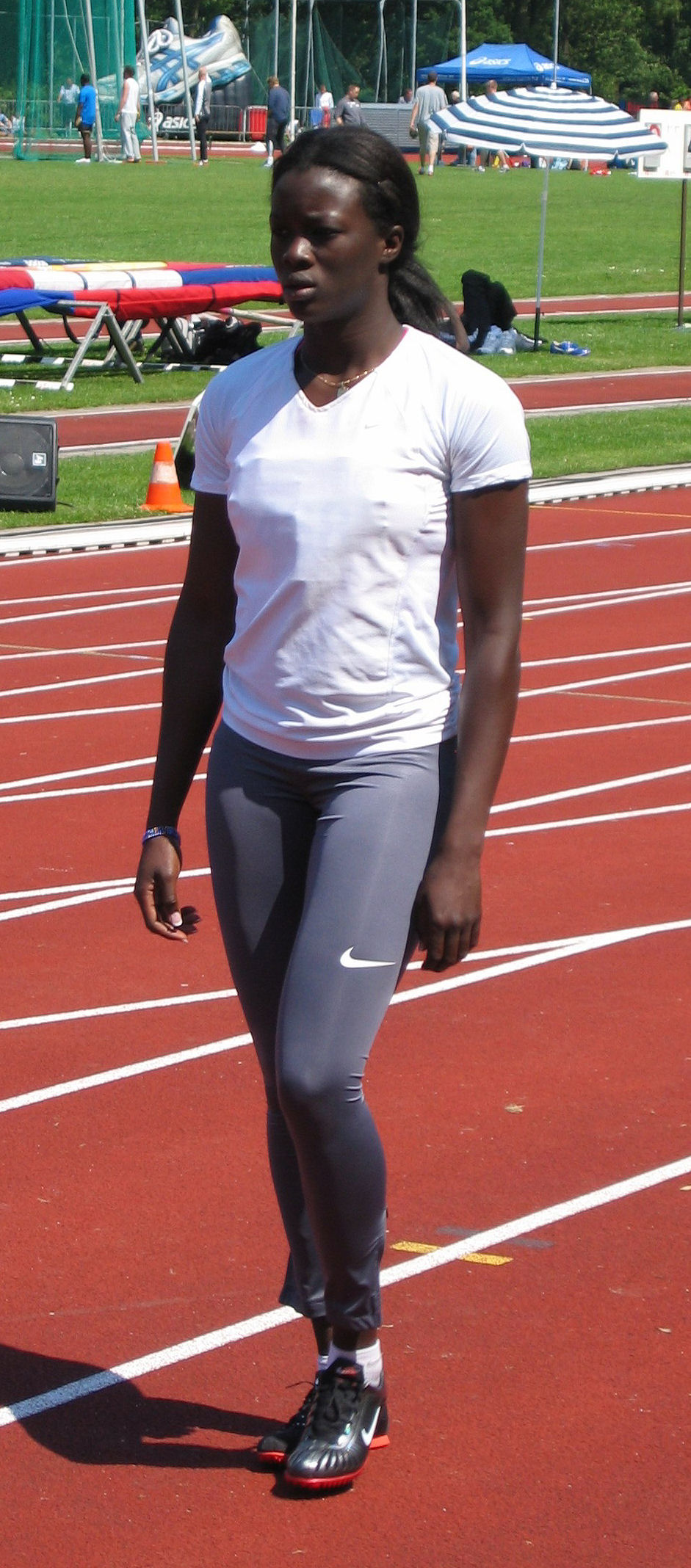
- Zagré at Gouden Spike Meeting in Leiden (2009)

Personal information
- Born: 13 March 1990 (age 36) Bree, Belgium
- Height: 1.76 m (5 ft 9 in)
- Weight: 63 kg (139 lb)

Sport
- Country: Belgium
- Club: Racing Brussel
- Now coaching: Jean Pêcher

Achievements and titles
- Personal bests: Outdoor; 100m - 11.42 (2012); 200m - 23.56 (2017); 100m hurdles - 12.71 (2015); Long jump - 5.86 m (2008); Triple jump - 12.08 m (2006); Indoor; 60m - 7.43 (2011); 60m hurdles - 7.98 (2017)
Medal record
Jeux de la Francophonie
Bronze medal – third place	2009 Beirut	100 m hurdles
European Junior Championships
Gold medal – first place	2009 Novi Sad	100 m hurdles
World Youth Championships
Bronze medal – third place	2007 Ostrava	100 m hurdles

Anne Zagré (born 13 March 1990) is a Belgian sprint athlete. In 2009 she became European youth champion in the 100m hurdles.

She competed at the 2020 Summer Olympics.

== Biography ==
Just like Élodie Ouédraogo, Zagré has her roots in Burkina Faso.

She won 3 junior titles during her youth career. She achieved her last title during the 2009 European Athletics Junior Championships in Novi Sad, at the 100m hurdles.

Since 2006, Zagré has also achieved two silver medals at national indoor championships: long jump (2007) and 60m hurdles (2009).

Zagré competed for the Florida State Seminoles track and field team in the NCAA.

== Competition record ==
Year	Competition	Venue	Position	Event	Notes
Representing Belgium
2007	World Youth Championships	Ostrava, Czech Republic	14th (qf)	100 m	12.01
2007	World Youth Championships	Ostrava, Czech Republic	3rd	100 m hurdles	13.58
2008	World Junior Championships	Bydgoszcz, Poland	26th (h)	100 m	11.98 (-1.9 m/s)
2008	World Junior Championships	Bydgoszcz, Poland	5th	100 m hurdles	13.55 (-2.4 m/s)
2009	European Junior Championships	Novi Sad, Serbia	1st	100 m hurdles	13.21
2009	World Championships	Berlin, Germany	12th (h)	4 × 100 m relay	43.99
2009	Jeux de la Francophonie	Beirut, Lebanon	3rd	100 m hurdles	13.37
2010	European Championships	Barcelona, Spain	19th (h)	100 m hurdles	13.31
2011	European U23 Championships	Ostrava, Czech Republic	6th (h)	100 m hurdles	13.26 (Note: Did not finish in the final)
2011	World Championships	Daegu, South Korea	32nd (h)	100 m hurdles	13.47
2012	European Championships	Helsinki, Finland	5th	100 m hurdles	13.02
2012	European Championships	Helsinki, Finland	9th (h)	4 × 100 m relay	43.81
2012	Olympic Games	London, United Kingdom	17th (sf)	100 m hurdles	12.94
2013	World Championships	Moscow, Russia	8th (h)	100 m hurdles	12.94 (Note: Disqualified in the semifinals)
2013	Jeux de la Francophonie	Nice, France	1st	100 m hurdles	13.41
2013	Jeux de la Francophonie	Nice, France	1st	4 × 100 m relay	44.70
2014	European Championships	Zürich, Switzerland	4th	100 m hurdles	12.89
2015	European Indoor Championships	Prague, Czech Republic	17th (h)	60 m hurdles	8.15
2015	World Championships	Beijing, China	11th (sf)	100 m hurdles	12.88
2016	European Championships	Amsterdam, Netherlands	5th	100 m hurdles	12.97
2016	Olympic Games	Rio de Janeiro, Brazil	10th (h)	100 m hurdles	12.85^{1}
2017	European Indoor Championships	Belgrade, Serbia	–	60 m hurdles	DQ
2017	World Championships	London, United Kingdom	24th (sf)	100 m hurdles	13.34
2019	World Championships	Doha, Qatar	14th (h)	100 m hurdles	12.91^{1}
2021	European Indoor Championships	Toruń, Poland	12th (sf)	60 m hurdles	8.08
2021	Olympic Games	Tokyo, Japan	16th (sf)	100 m hurdles	12.78
2022	World Indoor Championships	Belgrade, Serbia	14th (sf)	60 m hurdles	8.08
2022	World Championships	Eugene, United States	28th (h)	100 m hurdles	14.05
2022	European Championships	Munich, Germany	13th (sf)	100 m hurdles	13.12
2023	European Indoor Championships	Istanbul, Turkey	12th (sf)	60 m hurdles	8.08
2024	European Championships	Rome, Italy	20th (h)	100 m hurdles	13.70

^{1}Disqualified in the semifinals
