= Liz Clay =

Australian hurdler (born 1995)

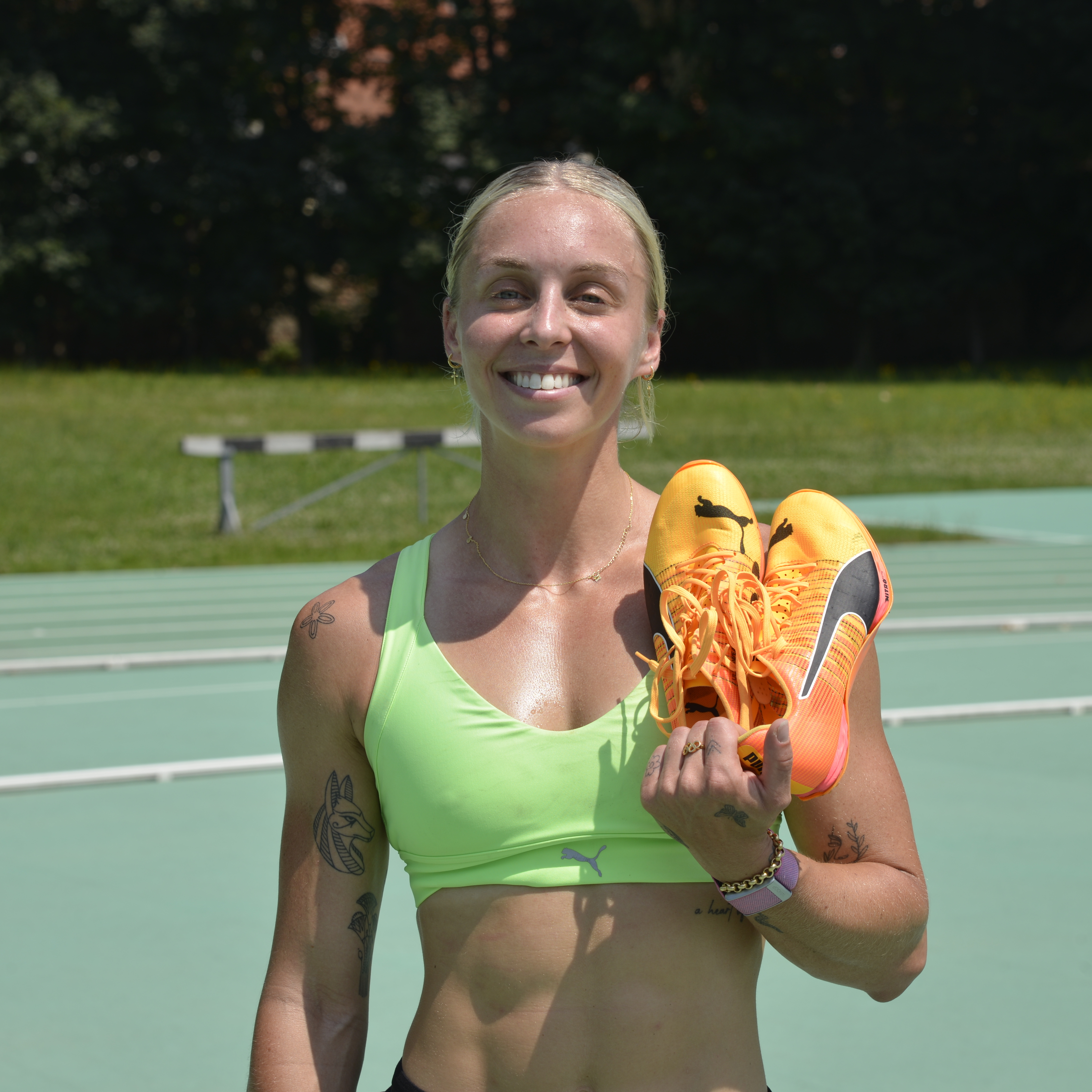
- Clay at the "Piero Ferrazzi" athletics track in Olgiate Olona in 2024

Personal information
- Born: Elizabeth Clay; 9 May 1995 (age 31) Wahroonga, New South Wales, Australia
- Height: 172 cm (5 ft 8 in)
- Weight: 64 kg (141 lb)

Sport
- Sport: Athletics
- Event: 100m hurdles
Medal record
Women's athletics
Representing Australia
Oceania Championships
Gold medal – first place	2024 Suva	100m hurdles

Elizabeth Clay (born 9 May 1995) is an Australian 100m hurdler. Her personal best of 12.71 at the Tokyo Olympics makes her the third fastest in Australian history.

== Career ==
=== Early years ===
Clay was born in Wahroonga, New South Wales, Australia. She became interested in athletics after watching her younger brother Harry compete, and joined Hornsby Little Athletics as an under-10.

She made her junior international debut at the 2014 World Juniors in the 100m hurdles, but had to withdraw from the team when she broke her navicular bone weeks before the team departed. Clay then completed an exercise and sports science degree in Sydney and relocated to the Gold Coast to work with Australian hurdles coach, Sharon Hannan, who had guided Sally Pearson to Olympic gold in 2012.

=== Later career ===
Clay ran 12.94 to win at the 2020 Melbourne Track Classic. The following year, she opened her season with 12.84 in Brisbane and followed this with a 12.72 in Canberra, both meeting the automatic qualifying standard for the 2020 Tokyo Olympics.

At the Tokyo Olympics Clay ran 12.87 seconds to finish second in her heat and reach the semi-finals, where she ran a personal best of 12.71 for third, which was not fast enough to progress to the final.

She competed in the 100m hurdles at the 2024 Paris Olympics. She won the 2025 Australian Athletics Championships 100m hurdles race in Perth on 13 April 2025. She placed eighth at the 2025 Shanghai Diamond League event in China on 3 May 2025. In September, she competed at the 2025 World Athletics Championships in Tokyo, Japan.
