= Ditaji Kambundji =

Swiss hurdler (born 2002)

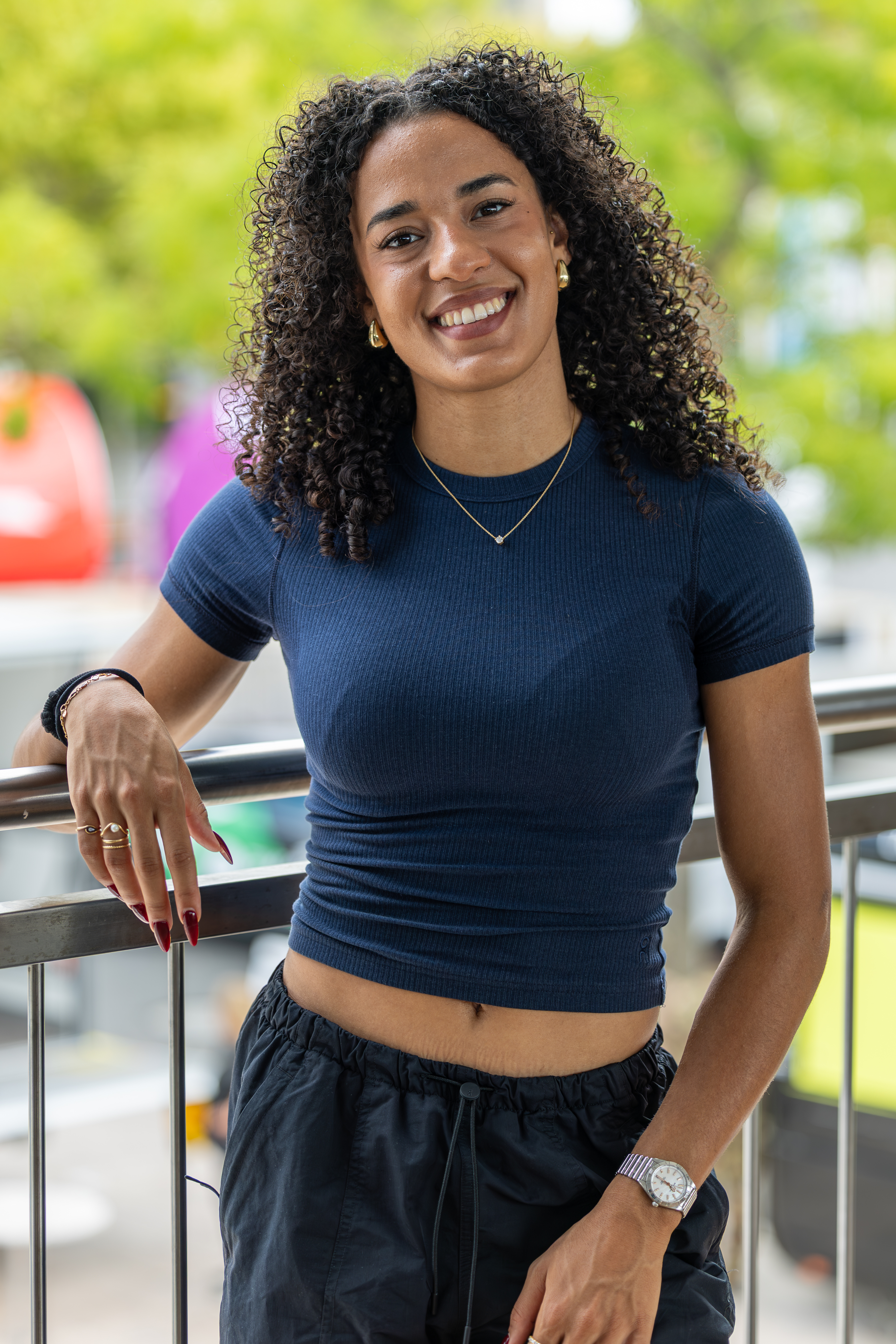
- Kambundji in 2026

Personal information
- Born: 20 May 2002 (age 24) Bern, Switzerland
- Height: 1.65 m (5 ft 5 in)
- Weight: 57 kg (126 lb)

Sport
- Country: Switzerland
- Sport: Athletics
- Event: 100 metres hurdles
- Club: STB Leichtathletik
- Coached by: Florian Clivaz (2022— ) Adrian Rothenbühler (2017—2022)

Achievements and titles
- Personal bests: 60 m hurdles: 7.67 (Apeldoorn, 2025) AR; 100 m hurdles: 12.24 (Tokyo, 2025) NR
Medal record
Women's athletics
Representing Switzerland
World Championships
Gold medal – first place	2025 Tokyo	100 m hurdles
World Indoor Championships
Silver medal – second place	2025 Nanjing	60 m hurdles
European Championships
Silver medal – second place	2024 Rome	100 m hurdles
Bronze medal – third place	2022 Munich	100 m hurdles
European Indoor Championships
Gold medal – first place	2025 Apeldoorn	60 m hurdles
Bronze medal – third place	2023 Istanbul	60 m hurdles
European U23 Championships
Gold medal – first place	2023 Espoo	100 m hurdles
European U20 Championships
Gold medal – first place	2021 Tallinn	100 m hurdles
Youth Olympic Festival
Bronze medal – third place	2019 Baku	100 m hurdles

Ditaji Kambundji (born 20 May 2002) is a Swiss athlete specialising in the sprint hurdles. She is the reigning World Champion in the 100 metres hurdles. She also won a bronze medal at the 2022 European Championships and bronze over the 60 metres hurdles at the 2023 European Indoor Championships.

Kambundji was the 100 m hurdles 2021 European under-20 champion and 2023 European U23 champion. She competed in the event at both the delayed 2020 Tokyo and 2024 Paris Olympics. She is the Swiss record holder for the 60 m hurdles and 100 m hurdles. She is also a six-time national champion. Her personal best of 12.24 s puts her seventh on the all-time top list.

== Early life and family ==
Ditaji Kambundji was born on 20 May 2002 in Bern to a Congolese father, Safuka, and a Swiss mother, Ruth. She is the last of four children. Her older sister is Swiss sprinter Mujinga Kambundji, and her sister Muswama competes in bobsleigh.

Ditaji grew up watching her siblings excel in athletics. She spent a majority of her time going to her sisters' competitions and cheering them on, which naturally influenced her to follow in their footsteps. She gives credit to her sisters for laying the path for her and making it easier when she finally joined their track club. She tried different disciplines at first before gravitating toward the hurdles. Both Ditaji and Mujinga enjoy gardening, as well as taking care of plants, when they are not competing.

== Career ==
=== 2020-2022: Initial breakthrough ===
Kambundji won her first senior national title on 12 September 2020, winning the 100 m hurdles in 13.07 s.

The following year, she broke the sub-13 s barrier for the first time by winning the Meeting Meilen in 12.99 s on 29 May. She retained her Swiss title in June, running 13.03 s. The next month, she won gold at the European U20 Championships in Tallinn, also running 13.03 s. She competed at the delayed 2020 Summer Olympics later that month, finishing eighth in her heat in 13.17 s.

In 2022, Kambundji recorded her first sub-8 s clocking in the 60 m hurdles, running 7.98 s to win at the Nationales Hallenmeeting in Magglingen. She further improved her personal best to 7.97 s to win the Swiss Indoor Championships on 27 February. At the World Indoor Championships in Belgrade, she made the final of the 60 m hurdles, where she did not finish. She had previously ran a national record of 7.89 s in the semi-final.

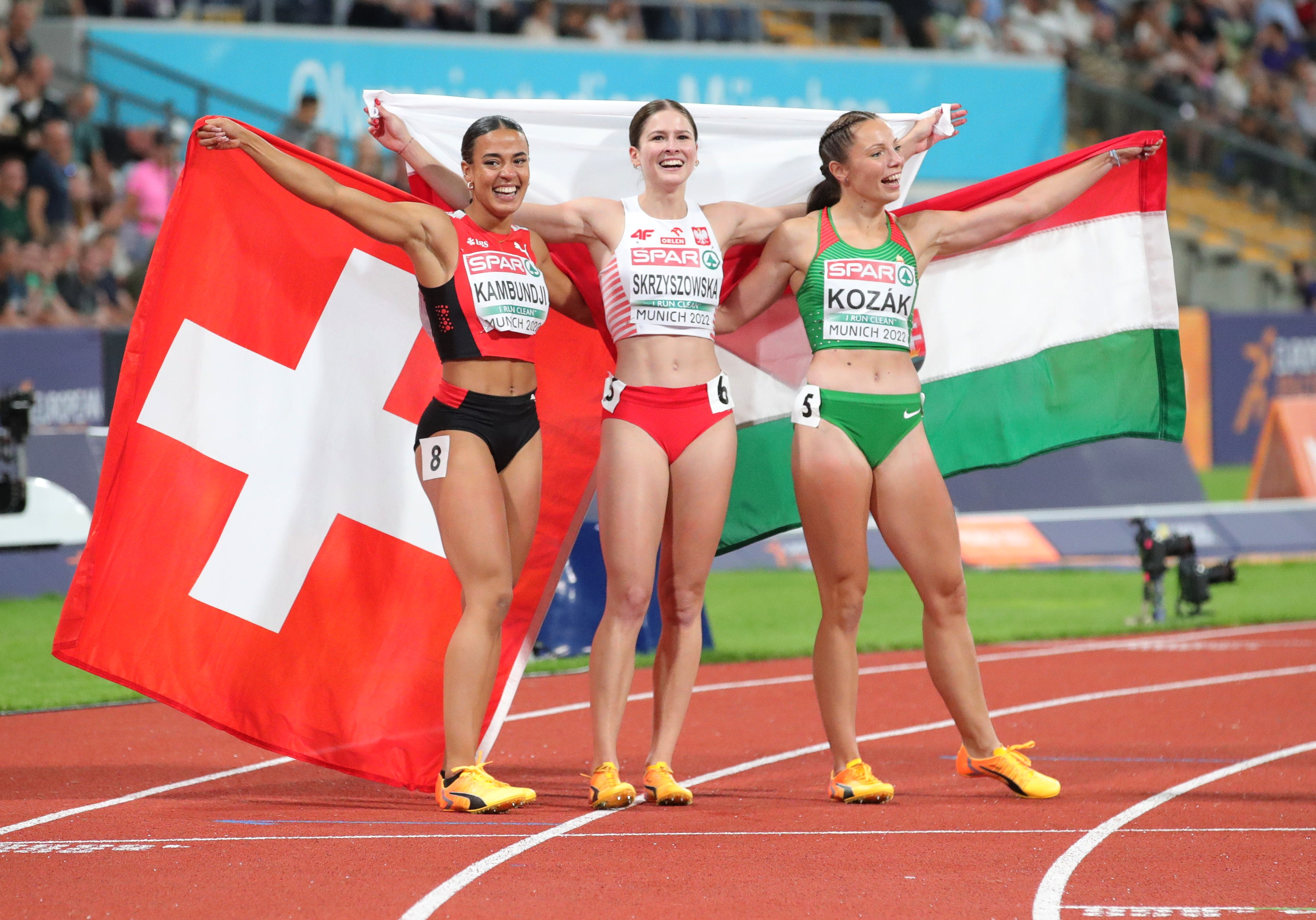
Kambundji (left) after the 100 m hurdles at the 2022 European Championships.

Kambundji set a new personal best of 12.77 s in winning the CITIUS Meeting in Bern on 14 June 2022. At the World Championships in Eugene held the following month, she made the semi-finals of the 100 m hurdles, improving her personal best to 12.70 s. She also competed at the European Championships, winning a bronze medal in 12.74 s.

=== 2023-2024: European U23 champion ===
In 2023, Kambundji improved her national record in the 60 m hurdles to 7.81 s in winning gold at the Swiss Indoor Championships. At the European Indoor Championships in Istanbul, she won a bronze medal in the 60 m hurdles, running a time of 7.91 s.

At the 2023 European U23 Championships in Espoo, Kambundji won gold over the 100 m hurdles in a new personal best and championship record of 12.68 s. In August, she ran a new European U23 record and national record of 12.47 s in winning the final of the 100 m hurdles at the CITIUS Meeting, beating the mark of 12.51 s she had set in the heats. Later that month, she competed at the World Championships in Budapest, placing seventh in the final.

The following year, Kambundji won her first Diamond League in Doha on 10 May, narrowly beating Tonea Marshall to the win in 12.49 s. She won again at the Golden Spike Ostrava on 28 May, running 12.63 s. At the European Championships in Rome, she won a silver medal in the 100 m hurdles, improving her own European U23 record to 12.40 s to finish behind Cyrena Samba-Mayela. In August, Kambundji competed at the Paris Olympics, where she ran 12.68 s to finish fifth in her semi-final.

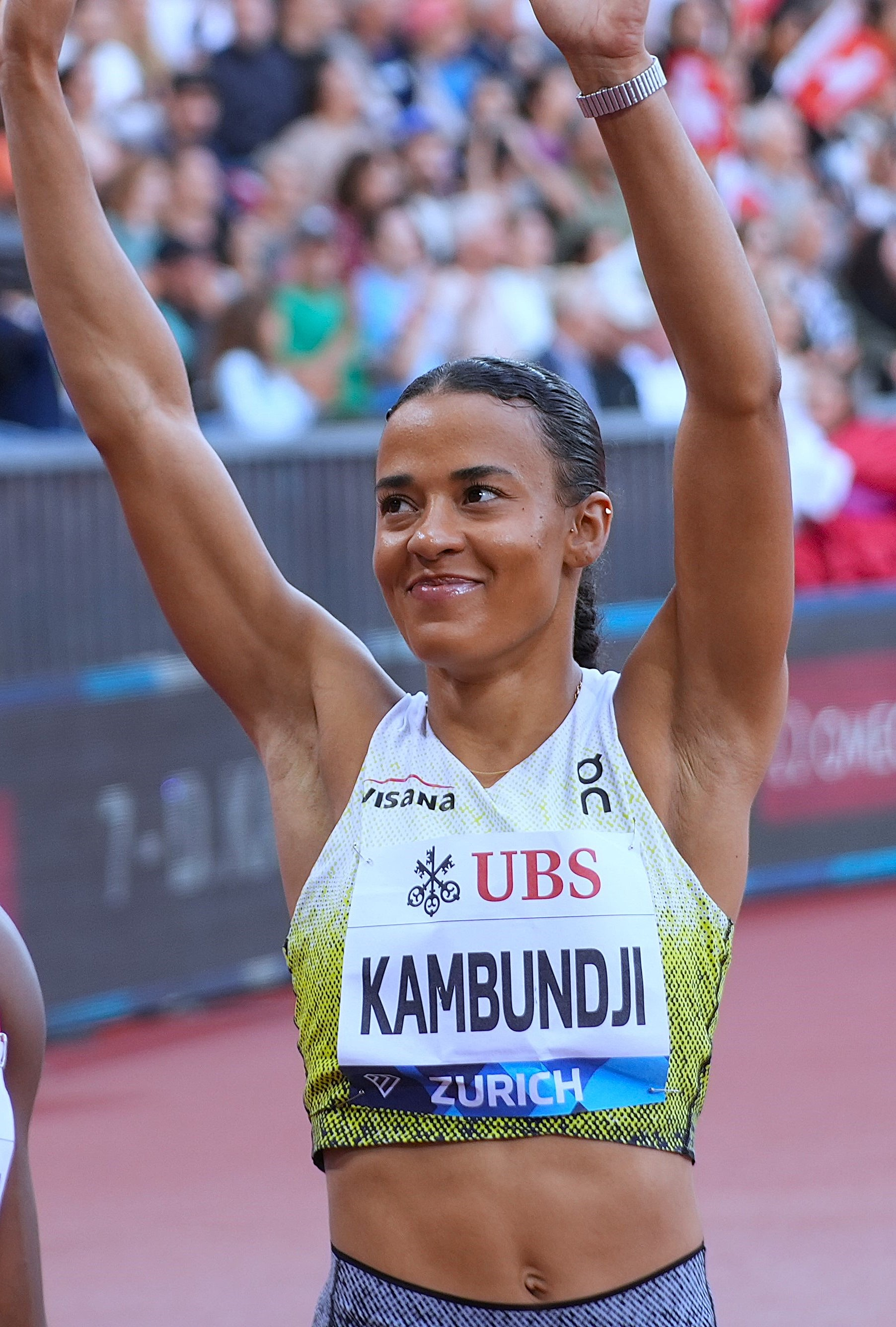
Ditaji Kambundji, Diamond League Final in Zurich 2025.

=== 2025-present: World champion ===
In February 2025, Kambundji won her fourth national title in the 60 m hurdles at the Swiss Indoor Championships, winning in 7.82 s. At the European Indoor Championships in March, she won gold over the 60 m hurdles, running a European record of 7.67 s, which placed her second on the all-time top lists. She also competed at the World Indoor Championships held in March, winning silver behind Devynne Charlton in 7.73 s.

Kambundji won the 100 m at the European Team Championships First Division in June 2025, running a wind-assisted time of 12.39 s (+2.2 m/s). She continued her good form with a second-place finish at the Monaco Diamond League in 12.43 s (-1.1 m/s), her second-fastest time at the time. On 15 July, she won at the Spitzen Leichtathletik Luzern in 12.49 s. She equalled her national record of 12.40 s in finishing second behind Ackera Nugent at the Diamond League Final in Zürich, on 28 August. At the 2025 World Championships in Tokyo, Kambundji won a shock gold in the 100 m hurdles, running a new national record of 12.24 s, the seventh-fastest time in history at the time. Speaking after the final, she stated "This is something I have been working for and to run it in the way I wanted to is special. Getting a personal best is nice but all that mattered today was the title."

== Statistics ==
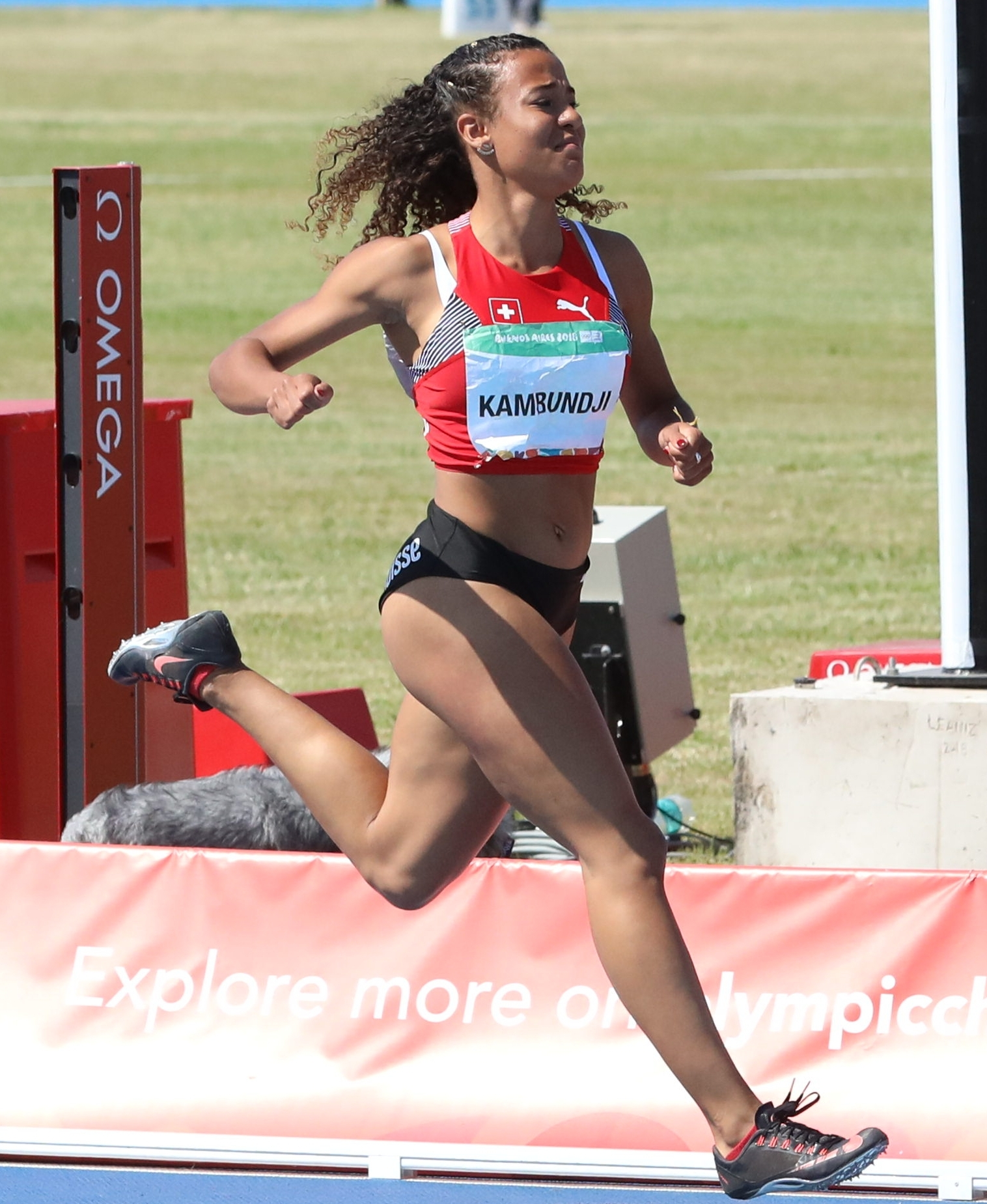
16-years-old Kambundji races at the 2018 Youth Olympics in Buenos Aires.

=== Personal bests ===
- 60 metres indoor – 7.31 (Magglingen 2023)
- 60 m hurdles – 7.67 (Apeldoorn 2025) AR
- 100 metres – 11.41 (+0.1 m/s, Philadelphia 2025)
- 100 m hurdles – 12.24 (−0.1 m/s, Tokyo 2025) NR

=== International competitions ===
Representing Switzerland
Year	Competition	Venue	Position	Event	Time
2018	European U18 Championships	Győr, Hungary	7th	100 mH (76.2cm)	13.77
2018	Youth Olympic Games	Buenos Aires, Argentina	14th	100 mH (76.2cm)	tot. 28.42
2019	Youth Olympic Festival	Baku, Azerbaijan	3rd	100 mH (76.2cm)	13.63
2021	European Indoor Championships	Toruń, Poland	11th (sf)	60 mH i	8.07
2021	European Team Championships, 1st League	Cluj-Napoca, Romania	4th	100 mH	12.98
2021	European U20 Championships	Tallinn, Estonia	1st	100 mH	13.03
2021	European U20 Championships	Tallinn, Estonia	– (f)	4 × 100 m relay	DNF
2021	Olympic Games	Tokyo, Japan	33rd (h)	100 mH	13.17
2021	World U20 Championships	Nairobi, Kenya	– (f)	100 mH	DQ
2022	World Indoor Championships	Belgrade, Serbia	– (f)	60 mH i	DNF
2022	World Championships	Eugene, OR, United States	13th (sf)	100 mH	12.70
2022	European Championships	Munich, Germany	3rd	100 mH	12.74 PB
2023	European Indoor Championships	Istanbul, Turkey	3rd	60 mH i	7.91
2023	European Team Championships	Chorzów, Poland	— (f)	100 mH	DQ
2023	European U23 Championships	Espoo, Finland	1st	100 mH	12.68 CR
2023	World Championships	Budapest, Hungary	7th	100 mH	12.70
2024	European Championships	Rome, Italy	2nd	100 mH	12.40
2024	Olympic Games	Paris, France	14th (sf)	100 mH	12.68
2025	European Indoor Championships	Apeldoorn, Netherlands	1st	60 mH i	7.67 AR, CR
2025	World Indoor Championships	Nanjing, China	2nd	60 mH i	7.73
2025	World Championships	Tokyo, Japan	1st	100 mH	12.24 NR
2026	World Indoor Championships	Toruń, Poland	4th	60 mH i	7.75
2026	European Championships	Birmingham, United Kingdom	4th	100 mH	12.75

=== National titles ===
- Swiss Athletics Championships (3)
  - 100 m hurdles: 2020, 2021, 2023
- Swiss Indoor Athletics Championships (4)
  - 60 m hurdles: 2021, 2022, 2023, 2025

=== Circuit performances ===
- Diamond League (podiums)
  - 2024: Doha (1st)
  - 2025: Herculis Monaco (2nd)
  - 2025: Athletissima Lausanne (3rd)
  - 2025: Weltklasse Zürich (2nd)
- World Athletics Indoor Tour (Gold level meetings) (podiums)
  - 2025: Copernicus Cup (2nd)

== See also ==
- List of Swiss records in athletics
- Switzerland at the Olympics
