= Cindy Sember =

American-born British hurdler (born 1994)

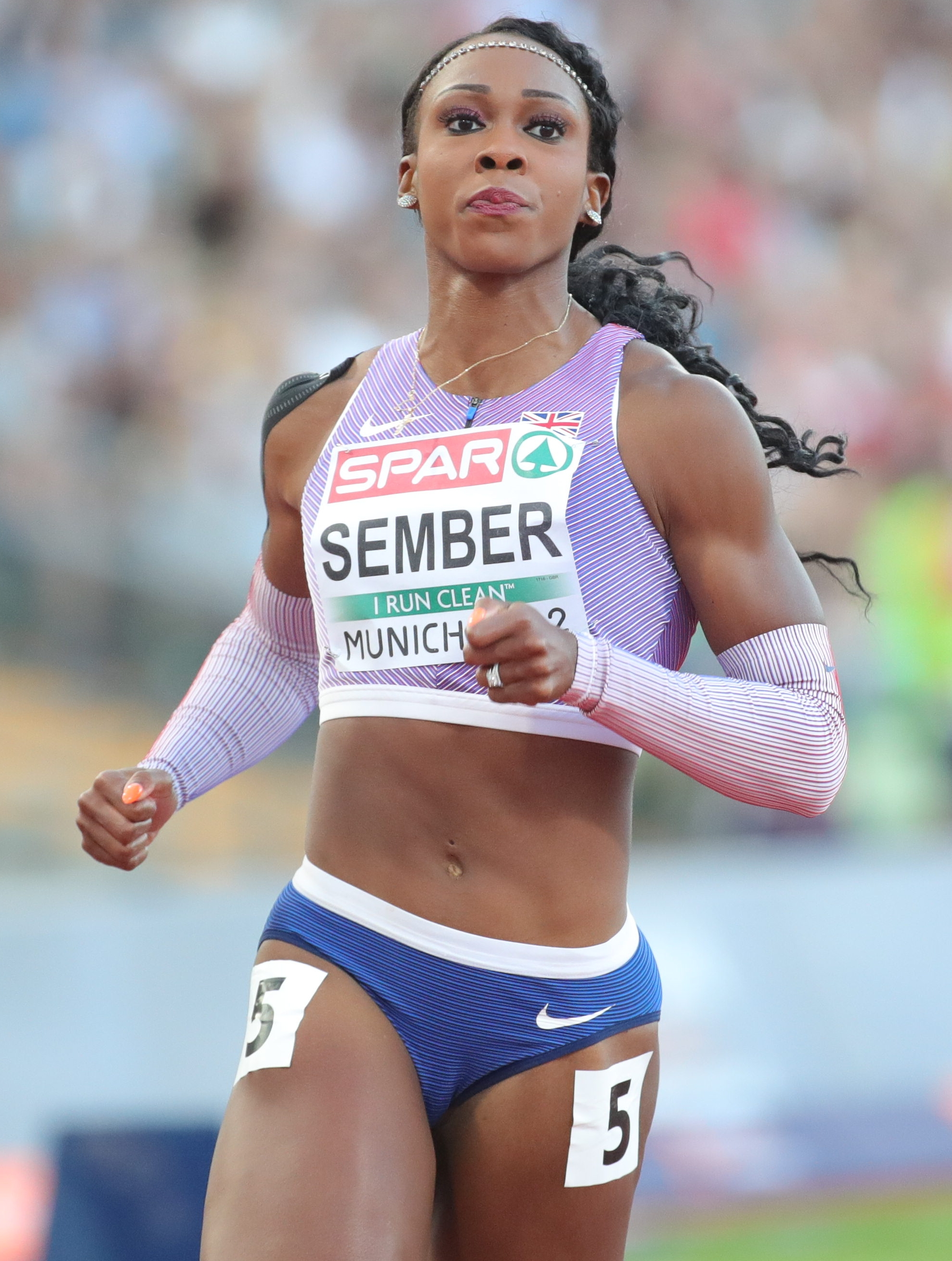
- Ofili in 2022

Personal information
- Nationality: British, American
- Born: Cynthia Nonyelum Ofili; 5 August 1994 (age 32) Ypsilanti, Michigan, United States
- Education: University of Michigan
- Height: 178 cm (5 ft 10 in)
- Weight: 68 kg (150 lb)

Sport
- Sport: Track and field
- Events: 60 metres hurdles 100 metres hurdles 60 metres 200 metres
- College team: University of Michigan
- Club: Woodford Green with Essex Ladies

Achievements and titles
- Personal bests: 12.50 (100 m hurdles); 7.89i (60 m hurdles)
Medal record
Representing Great Britain
European Indoor Championships
Silver medal – second place	2021 Toruń	60m hurdles
Representing England
Commonwealth Games
Bronze medal – third place	2022 Birmingham	100m hurdles

Cynthia Nonyelum Sember (née Ofili; born 5 August 1994) is an American-born British former track and field athlete, who specialised in sprint hurdles. She finished fourth in the 100 metres hurdles final at the 2016 Olympic Games as a 22 year old but suffered significant injury set backs thereafter which interrupted most of the next Olympic cycle. Her first major international medal, a silver at the 2021 European Indoor Championships sparked a return to form and fitness that saw her finish fifth at the 2022 World Athletics Championships, and secure bronze for England at the 2022 Commonwealth Games, her first senior outdoor medal. She made the final of the same event at the 2022 European Athletics Championships but a stumble left her in 8th position in her third major final of the year.

Her time in the World Championships semi-finals, 12.50, is a British record in the outdoor event. Her 12.38 from the final is the fastest time ever run by a British athlete in the event, but was wind-assisted.

Domestically, Sember is a five-time British champion in the 100 metres hurdles.

== Biography ==
Ofili is a native of Ypsilanti, Michigan, and the younger sister of fellow hurdler Tiffany Porter (née Ofili); as her mother is British and her dad Nigerian, she was born with American, Nigerian, and British citizenship. In 2014, her sophomore year at the University of Michigan, Ofili qualified for the 60 m hurdles final at the NCAA indoor championships, placing sixth in a personal best 8.07; outdoors, she broke 13 seconds in the 100 m hurdles for the first time, winning the Big Ten conference championship in 12.93. In addition to hurdling, she competed in the sprints, setting Michigan indoor school records at both 60 metres (7.37) and 200 metres (23.69).

Ofili's times improved in 2015, and she became a leading collegiate hurdler; at the NCAA outdoor championships in Eugene she placed second in a personal best 12.60, losing only to Keni Harrison of Kentucky. She also qualified for the NCAA championship meet in the flat 100 m, but despite running a school record 11.39 she was eliminated in the semi-finals in that event.

Ofili could have chosen to internationally represent either the United States, Great Britain or Nigeria (her father's country of origin); in June 2015 it was announced that she had selected Britain, following her older sister Tiffany Porter. Ofili, who unlike her sister had not represented the United States as a junior, stated she felt British. At the 2015 British championships Ofili placed second to Porter in 12.96, qualifying to represent Britain later that summer at the IAAF World Championships in Beijing.

Ofili finished fourth in the 100m hurdles final at the 2016 Olympics in Rio de Janeiro, in 12.63 secs.

In 2020, Ofili became a double British champion when successfully defending her title and winning the 100 metres hurdles event at the 2020 British Athletics Championships in a time of 13.16 sec.

Sember began competing under her married name of Cindy Sember from the 2021 season onwards. She won three more consecutive 100 metres hurdle titles from 2022 to 2024 respectively. After winning the 100 metres hurdles gold medal at the 2024 British Athletics Championships, Sember was subsequently named in the Great Britain team for the 2024 Summer Olympics.

Sember announce her retirement from athletics in July 2026.

== International competitions ==
Year	Competition	Venue	Position	Event	Notes
Representing Great Britain / England
2015	World Championships	Beijing, China	13th (sf)	100 m hurdles	12.91
2016	Olympic Games	Rio de Janeiro, Brazil	4th	100 m hurdles	12.63
2019	World Championships	Doha, Qatar	15th (sf)	100 m hurdles	12.95
2021	European Indoor Championships	Toruń, Poland	2nd	60 m hurdles	7.87
2021	Olympic Games	Tokyo, Japan	15th (sf)	100 m hurdles	12.76
2022	World Championships	Eugene, United States	5th	100 m hurdles	12.38
2022	Commonwealth Games	Birmingham, United Kingdom	3rd	100 m hurdles	12.59
2022	European Championships	Munich, Germany	8th	100 m hurdles	13.16
2023	World Championships	Budapest, Hungary	18th (sf)	100 m hurdles	12.97
2024	World Indoor Championships	Glasgow, United Kingdom	7th	60 m hurdles	7.92
2024	European Championships	Rome, Italy	4th	100 m hurdles	12.56
2024	Olympic Games	Paris, France	10th (h)	100 m hurdles	12.72 (Note: Did not finish in the semifinals)
(sf) indicates overall position in semifinals
