= Athletics at the 2020 Summer Olympics – Women's 100 metres hurdles =

Women's 100 metres hurdles at the Games of the XXXII Olympiad
- Olympic Athletics
- Venue: Japan National Stadium
- Dates: 31 July 2021 (round 1); 1 August 2021 (semifinals); 2 August 2021 (final)
- Competitors: 40 from 28 nations
- Winning time: 12.37 s

Medalists
| 1st place, gold medalist(s) | | Jasmine Camacho-Quinn | Puerto Rico |
| 2nd place, silver medalist(s) | | Kendra Harrison | United States |
| 3rd place, bronze medalist(s) | | Megan Tapper | Jamaica |

The women's 100 metres hurdles event at the 2020 Summer Olympics took place between 31 July and 2 August 2021 at the Japan National Stadium. 40 athletes from 28 nations competed. In the semifinals, Jasmine Camacho-Quinn of Puerto Rico broke the Olympic record, running 12.26 secs, to go equal fourth on the world all-time list. The following day in the final, she won the gold medal with a time of 12.37 secs. American world record holder Keni Harrison finished second to clinch silver and the bronze to Jamaica's Megan Tapper.

== Summary ==
Jasmine Camacho-Quinn came into the Olympics with the top 3 times of the year, making her the one to beat. After failing to make it to the 2016 Olympics, Kendra Harrison set the world record as a consolation. Five years later, this was her first Olympics. In the semi-final round, Camacho-Quinn confirmed her favorite status by setting the Olympic Record at 12.26, which also equalled the #4 time in history and set her national record. It took 12.67 just to get into the final.

From the gun, the final was a two-person race, Henderson out fast but Camacho-Quinn almost matching her for the first couple of hurdles. From there, Camacho-Quinn just was moving faster, passing over the fourth hurdle and pulling away on every hurdle after that. Out in lane 8, Megan Tapper was the next closest, slowly gaining on Harrison. Camacho-Quinn was the clear winner. Tapper couldn't catch Harrison for silver, but the judges spent several minutes confirming the photo finish before posting the next two places. The winning time was 12.37 as every athlete save Tapper and 4th place Tobi Amusan had run faster in the semifinals the previous evening.

== Background ==
This was the 13th appearance of the event, having appeared at every Olympics since 1972.

== Qualification ==
A National Olympic Committee (NOC) could enter up to 3 qualified athletes in the women's 100 metres hurdles event if all athletes meet the entry standard or qualify by ranking during the qualifying period. (The limit of 3 has been in place since the 1930 Olympic Congress.) The qualifying standard is 12.84 seconds. This standard was "set for the sole purpose of qualifying athletes with exceptional performances unable to qualify through the IAAF World Rankings pathway." The world rankings, based on the average of the best five results for the athlete over the qualifying period and weighted by the importance of the meet, will then be used to qualify athletes until the cap of 40 is reached.

The qualifying period was originally from 1 May 2019 to 29 June 2020. Due to the COVID-19 pandemic, the period was suspended from 6 April 2020 to 30 November 2020, with the end date extended to 29 June 2021. The world rankings period start date was also changed from 1 May 2019 to 30 June 2020; athletes who had met the qualifying standard during that time were still qualified, but those using world rankings would not be able to count performances during that time. The qualifying time standards could be obtained in various meets during the given period that have the approval of the IAAF. Only outdoor meets are eligible. The most recent Area Championships may be counted in the ranking, even if not during the qualifying period.

NOCs can also use their universality place—each NOC can enter one female athlete regardless of time if they had no female athletes meeting the entry standard for an athletics event—in the 100 metres hurdles.

== Records ==
Prior to this competition, the existing global and area records were as follows.

| World record | Kendra Harrison (USA) | 12.20 s | London, United Kingdom | 22 July 2016 |
| Olympic record | Sally Pearson (AUS) | 12.35 s | London, United Kingdom | 7 August 2012 |
| World Leading | Jasmine Camacho-Quinn (PUR) | 12.32 s | Gainesville, Florida, United States | 17 April 2021 |

| Area | Time (s) | Wind | Athlete | Nation |
|---|---|---|---|---|
| Africa (records) | 12.44 | +0.4 | Glory Alozie | Nigeria |
| Asia (records) | 12.44 | –0.8 | Olga Shishigina | Kazakhstan |
| Europe (records) | 12.21 | +0.7 | Yordanka Donkova | Bulgaria |
| North, Central America and Caribbean (records) | 12.20 WR | +0.3 | Kendra Harrison | United States |
| Oceania (records) | 12.28 | +1.1 | Sally Pearson | Australia |
| South America (records) | 12.71 | +0.1 | Maurren Maggi | Brazil |

The following record was established during the competition:

| Date | Event | Athlete | Nation | Time | Record |
|---|---|---|---|---|---|
| 1 August | Semifinal 3 | Jasmine Camacho-Quinn | Puerto Rico | 12.26 | OR |

The following national records were established during the competition:

| Nation | Athlete | Round | Time | Notes |
|---|---|---|---|---|
| Italy | Luminosa Bogliolo | Semifinals | 12.75 | |
| Puerto Rico | Jasmine Camacho-Quinn | Semifinals | | OR |
| Liberia | Ebony Morrison | Semifinals | 12.74 | |

== Schedule ==
All times are Japan Standard Time (UTC+9)

The women's 100 metres hurdles took place over three consecutive days.

| Date | Time | Round |
|---|---|---|
| Saturday, 31 July 2021 | 9:00 | Round 1 |
| Sunday, 1 August 2021 | 19:00 | Semifinals |
| Tuesday, 2 August 2021 | 9:00 | Final |

== Results ==
=== Round 1 ===
Qualification Rules: First 4 in each heat (Q) and the next 4 fastest (q) advance to the semifinals.

Wind readings- Heat 1: +1.0 m/s; Heat 2: +0.4 m/s; Heat 3: +0.4 m/s; Heat 4: -1.1 m/s; Heat 5: +0.3 m/s

==== Heat 1 ====
| Rank | Lane | Athlete | Nation | Time | Notes |
|---|---|---|---|---|---|
| 1 | 6 | Andrea Vargas | Costa Rica | 12.71 | Q, SB |
| 2 | 9 | Nadine Visser | Netherlands | 12.72 | Q, SB |
| 3 | 8 | Gabbi Cunningham | United States | 12.83 | Q |
| 4 | 5 | Cindy Sember | Great Britain | 13.00 | Q |
| 5 | 3 | Jiamin Chen | China | 13.09 | |
| 6 | 4 | Reetta Hurske | Finland | 13.10 | |
| 7 | 2 | Ayako Kimura | Japan | 13.25 | |
| 8 | 7 | Ricarda Lobe | Germany | 13.43 | |

==== Heat 2 ====
| Rank | Lane | Athlete | Nation | Time | Notes |
|---|---|---|---|---|---|
| 1 | 6 | Kendra Harrison | United States | 12.74 | Q |
| 2 | 3 | Liz Clay | Australia | 12.87 | Q |
| 3 | 2 | Luminosa Bogliolo | Italy | 12.93 | Q |
| 4 | 4 | Elvira Herman | Belarus | 12.95 | Q |
| 5 | 7 | Mulern Jean | Haiti | 12.99 | q, SB |
| 6 | 9 | Ebony Morrison | Liberia | 13.00 | q |
| 7 | 8 | Sarah Lavin | Ireland | 13.16 | |
| 8 | 5 | Laura Valette | France | 14.52 | |

==== Heat 3 ====
| Rank | Lane | Athlete | Nation | Time | Notes |
|---|---|---|---|---|---|
| 1 | 4 | Tobi Amusan | Nigeria | 12.72 | Q |
| 2 | 8 | Yanique Thompson | Jamaica | 12.74 | Q |
| 3 | 6 | Pia Skrzyszowska | Poland | 12.75 | Q, PB |
| 4 | 9 | Devynne Charlton | Bahamas | 12.84 | Q |
| 5 | 7 | Annimari Korte | Finland | 13.06 | |
| 6 | 3 | Marthe Koala | Burkina Faso | 13.11 | |
| 7 | 2 | Masumi Aoki | Japan | 13.59 | |
| — | 5 | Elisavet Pesiridou | Greece | — | DNF |

==== Heat 4 ====
| Rank | Lane | Athlete | Nation | Time | Notes |
|---|---|---|---|---|---|
| 1 | 9 | Britany Anderson | Jamaica | 12.67 | Q |
| 2 | 3 | Christina Clemons | United States | 12.91 | Q |
| 3 | 4 | Luca Kozak | Hungary | 12.97 | Q |
| 4 | 7 | Pedrya Seymour | Bahamas | 13.04 | Q |
| 5 | 5 | Elisa Maria di Lazzaro | Italy | 13.08 | |
| 6 | 2 | Teresa Errandonea | Spain | 13.15 | |
| 7 | 8 | Ketiley Batista | Brazil | 13.40 | |
| — | 6 | Cyrena Samba-Mayela | France | — | DNS |

==== Heat 5 ====
| Rank | Lane | Athlete | Nation | Time | Notes |
|---|---|---|---|---|---|
| 1 | 2 | Jasmine Camacho-Quinn | Puerto Rico | 12.41 | Q |
| 2 | 5 | Megan Tapper | Jamaica | 12.53 | Q, PB |
| 3 | 8 | Anne Zagre | Belgium | 12.83 | Q, SB |
| 4 | 6 | Tiffany Porter | Great Britain | 12.85 | Q |
| 5 | 4 | Asuka Terada | Japan | 12.95 | q |
| 6 | 3 | Klaudia Siciarz | Poland | 12.98 | q |
| 7 | 9 | Zoe Sedney | Netherlands | 13.03 | |
| 8 | 7 | Ditaji Kambundji | Switzerland | 13.17 | |
| 9 | 1 | Ana Camila Pirelli | Paraguay | 13.98 | SB |

=== Semifinals ===
Qualification rules: First 2 in each heat (Q) and the next 2 fastest (q) advance to the finals.

Wind readings- Heat 1: -0.8 m/s; Heat 2: +0.0 m/s; Heat 3: -0.2 m/s

==== Semifinal 1 ====
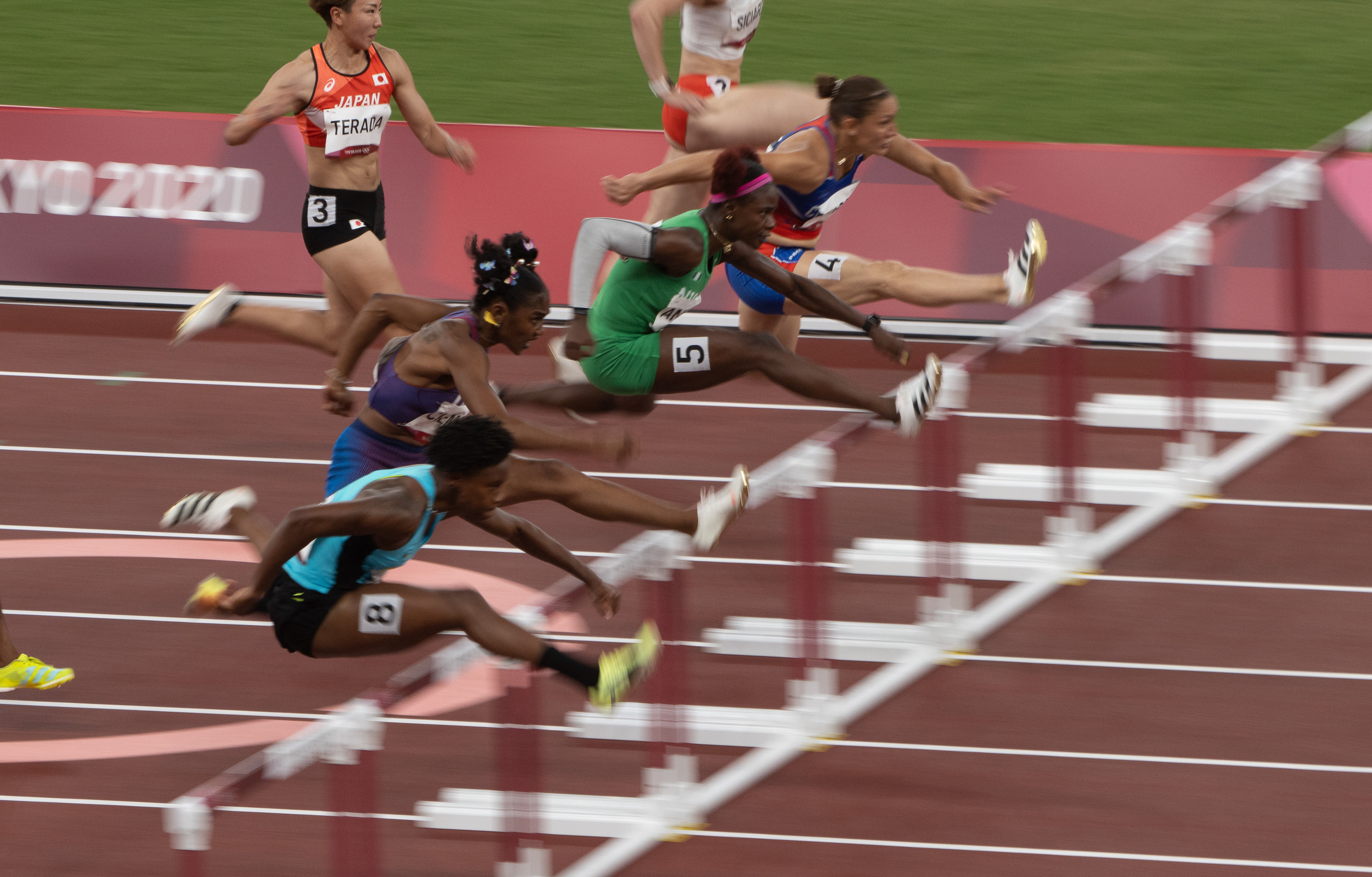
Tokyo 2020 Olympic Games 100m hurdles semi-final 1, from left: Devynne Charlton (BAH), Christina Clemons (USA), Tobi Amuson and Andrea Carolina Vargas (CRC)

| Rank | Lane | Athlete | Nation | Time | Notes |
|---|---|---|---|---|---|
| 1 | 5 | Tobi Amusan | Nigeria | 12.62 | Q |
| 2 | 8 | Devynne Charlton | Bahamas | 12.66 | Q |
| 3 | 4 | Andrea Vargas | Costa Rica | 12.69 | SB |
| 4 | 7 | Christina Clemons | United States | 12.76 | |
| 5 | 2 | Klaudia Siciarz | Poland | 12.84 | SB |
| 6 | 3 | Asuka Terada | Japan | 13.06 | |
| | 9 | Luca Kozak | Hungary | | DNF |
| | 6 | Yanique Thompson | Jamaica | | DNF |

==== Semifinal 2 ====
| Rank | Lane | Athlete | Nation | Time | Notes |
|---|---|---|---|---|---|
| 1 | 4 | Britany Anderson | Jamaica | 12.40 | Q, PB |
| 2 | 7 | Kendra Harrison | United States | 12.51 | Q |
| 3 | 6 | Liz Clay | Australia | 12.71 | PB |
| 4 | 8 | Luminosa Bogliolo | Italy | 12.75 | NR |
| 5 | 9 | Tiffany Porter | Great Britain | 12.86 | |
| 6 | 5 | Pia Skrzyszowska | Poland | 12.89 | |
| 7 | 2 | Mulern Jean | Haiti | 13.09 | (0.088) |
| 8 | 3 | Pedrya Seymour | Bahamas | 13.09 | (0.090) |

==== Semifinal 3 ====
| Rank | Lane | Athlete | Nation | Time | Notes |
|---|---|---|---|---|---|
| 1 | 7 | Jasmine Camacho-Quinn | Puerto Rico | 12.26 | Q, OR, NR |
| 2 | 4 | Megan Tapper | Jamaica | 12.62 | Q |
| 3 | 6 | Nadine Visser | Netherlands | 12.63 | q, SB |
| 4 | 8 | Gabbi Cunningham | United States | 12.67 | q |
| 5 | 9 | Elvira Herman | Belarus | 12.71 | |
| 6 | 2 | Ebony Morrison | Liberia | 12.74 | NR |
| 7 | 3 | Cindy Sember | Great Britain | 12.76 | |
| 8 | 5 | Anne Zagre | Belgium | 12.78 | SB |

=== Final ===
Wind reading: -0.3 m/s

| Rank | Lane | Athlete | Nation | Reaction | Time | Notes |
|---|---|---|---|---|---|---|
| 1st place, gold medalist(s) | 5 | Jasmine Camacho-Quinn | Puerto Rico | 0.149 | 12.37 | |
| 2nd place, silver medalist(s) | 4 | Kendra Harrison | United States | 0.158 | 12.52 | |
| 3rd place, bronze medalist(s) | 9 | Megan Tapper | Jamaica | 0.166 | 12.55 | |
| 4 | 6 | Tobi Amusan | Nigeria | 0.161 | 12.60 | |
| 5 | 3 | Nadine Visser | Netherlands | 0.152 | 12.73 | |
| 6 | 8 | Devynne Charlton | Bahamas | 0.144 | 12.74 | |
| 7 | 2 | Gabbi Cunningham | United States | 0.172 | 13.01 | |
| 8 | 7 | Britany Anderson | Jamaica | 0.164 | 13.24 | |
