= Reetta Hurske =

Finnish hurdler (born 1995)

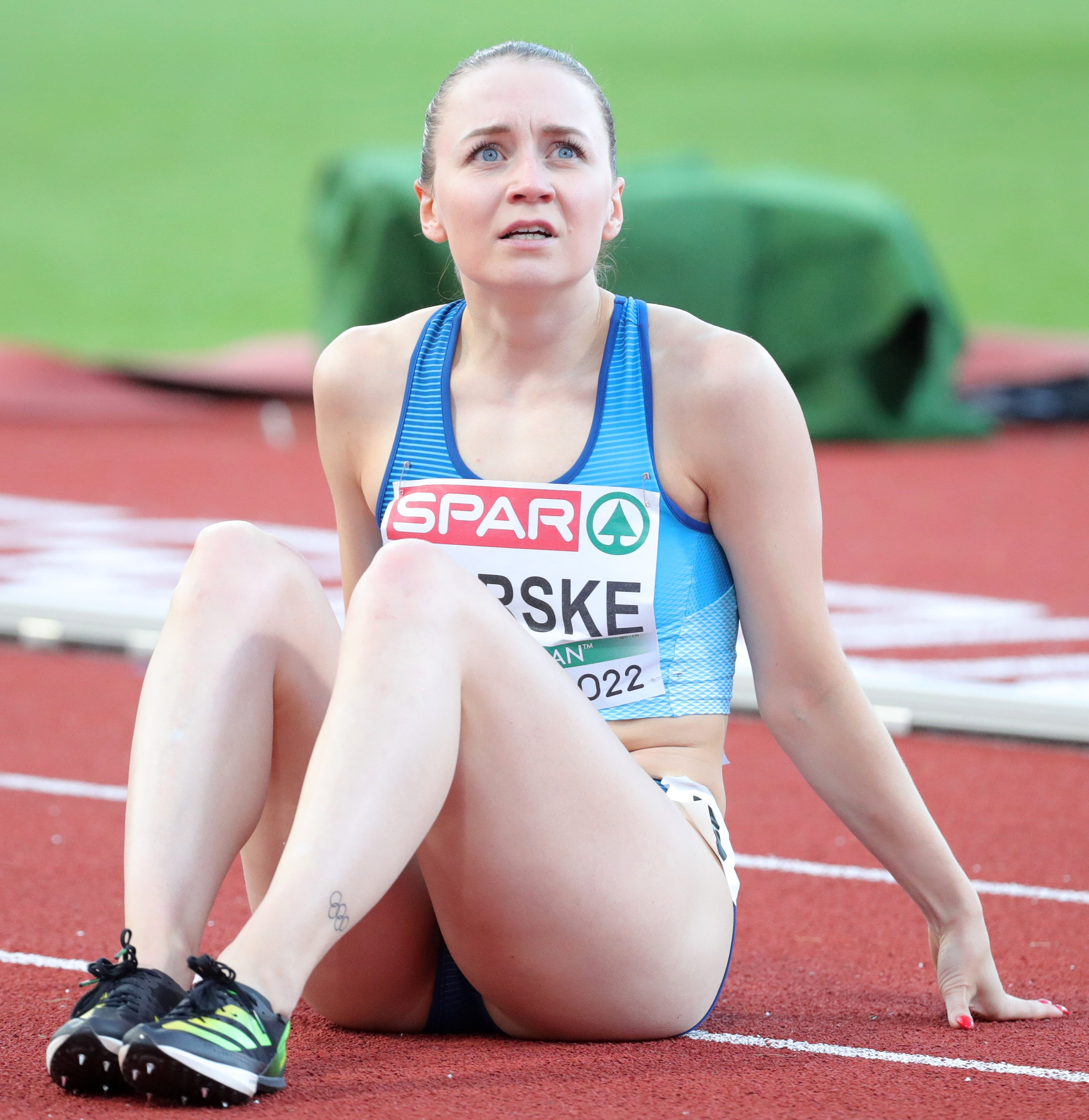
- Reetta Hurske in 2022

Personal information
- Born: 15 May 1995 (age 31) Ikaalinen, Finland
- Education: Tampere University of Applied Sciences
- Height: 1.68 m (5 ft 6 in)
- Weight: 58 kg (128 lb)

Sport
- Country: Finland
- Sport: Athletics
- Events: 100 m hurdles, 60 m hurdles
- Club: Tampereen Pyrintö
- Coached by: Marjukka Suihko
Medal record
Women's athletics
Representing Finland
European Indoor Championships
Gold medal – first place	2023 Istanbul	60 m hurdles
Universiade
Silver medal – second place	2019 Naples	100 m hurdles

Reetta Sofi Kaarina Hurske (born 15 May 1995) is a Finnish athlete specialising in the sprint hurdles. She won the gold medal in the 60 metres hurdles at the 2023 European Indoor Championships, winning Finland its first ever medal in this event, after finishing fourth at the 2019 edition. Hurske placed second in the 100 metres hurdles at the 2019 Universiade.

She represented her country at the 2020 Tokyo Olympics as well as the 2019 and 2022 World Athletics Championships. She is the Finnish indoor record holder for the 60 m hurdles, and won two individual national titles.

Hurske improved the Finnish record in the 60 m hurdles five times in 2023 (7.90, 7.88, 7.86, 7.81 and 7.79 seconds).

== Personal life ==
Hurske is in a relationship with Finnish basketball player Topias Palmi.

== Statistics ==
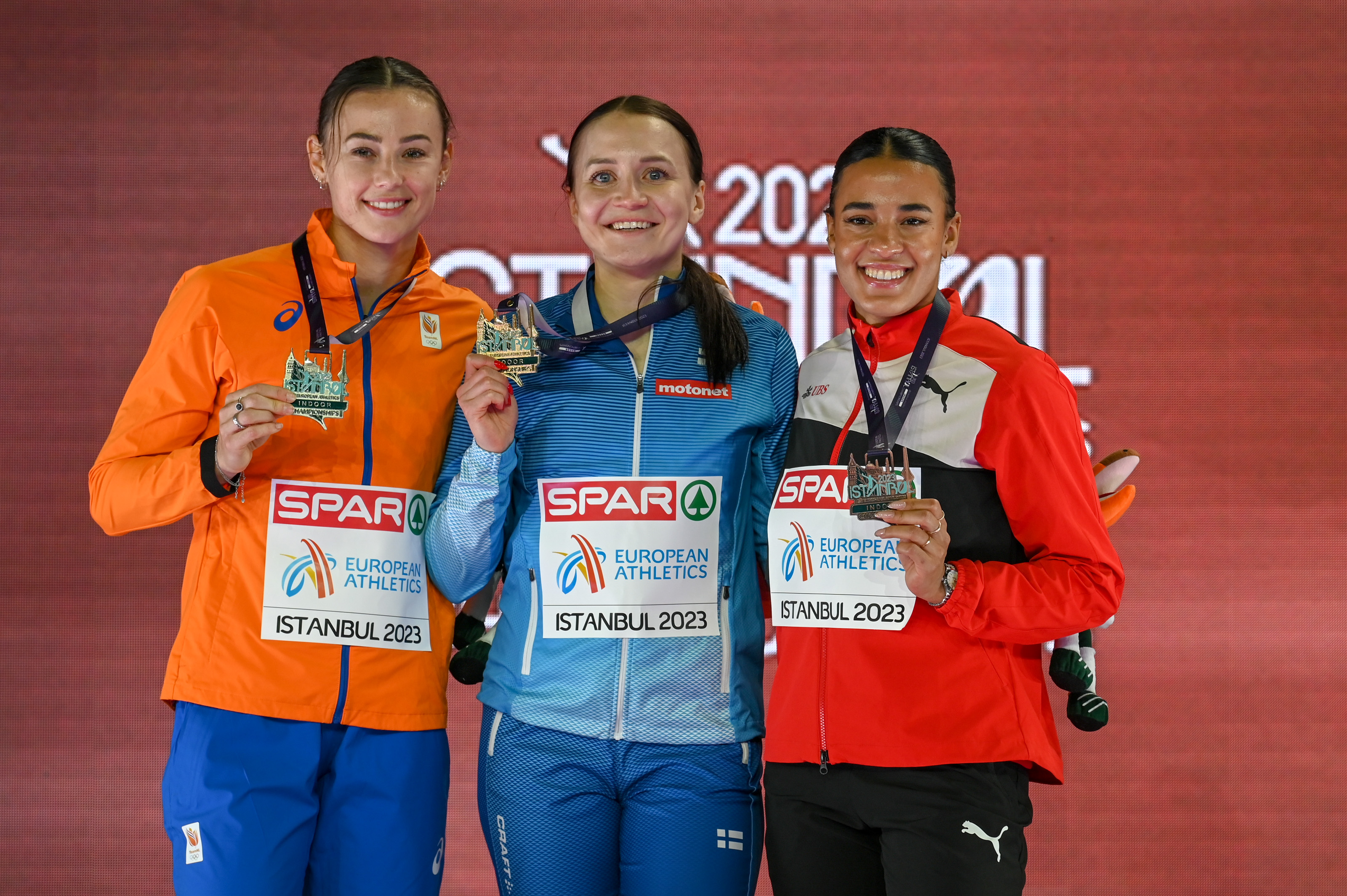
Hurske (centre) with her gold medal at the 2023 European Indoor Championships in Istanbul

=== Personal bests ===
- 60 m hurdles – 7.79 (Madrid 2023) NR
- 60 metres indoor – 7.50 (Tampere 2023)

- 100 m hurdles – 12.78 (+1.3 m/s, Joensuu 2019)
- 100 metres – 12.10 (-0.6 m/s, Kauhava 2017)

=== International competitions ===
Representing Finland
Year	Competition	Venue	Position	Event	Time
2011	European Youth Olympic Festival	Trabzon, Turkey	7th	100 m hurdles (76.2 cm)	13.85
2011	European Youth Olympic Festival	Trabzon, Turkey	9th (h)	4 × 100 m relay	47.78
2013	European Junior Championships	Rieti, Italy	5th	100 m hurdles	13.53
2013	European Junior Championships	Rieti, Italy	7th	4 × 100 m relay	47.18
2013	European Junior Championships	Rieti, Italy	22nd (q)	Long jump	5.88 m
2014	World Junior Championships	Eugene, OR, United States	7th	100 m hurdles	13.69
2015	European U23 Championships	Tallinn, Estonia	12th (sf)	100 m hurdles	13.66
2016	European Championships	Amsterdam, Netherlands	21st (sf)	100 m hurdles	13.40
2017	European Indoor Championships	Belgrade, Serbia	–	60 m hurdles	DQ
2017	European U23 Championships	Bydgoszcz, Poland	5th	100 m hurdles	13.32
2017	Universiade	Taipei, Taiwan	11th (sf)	100 m hurdles	13.67
2018	World Indoor Championships	Birmingham, United Kingdom	19th (sf)	60 m hurdles	8.20
2018	European Championships	Berlin, Germany	18th (sf)	100 m hurdles	13.20
2019	European Indoor Championships	Glasgow, United Kingdom	4th	60 m hurdles	8.02
2019	Universiade	Naples, Italy	2nd	100 m hurdles	13.02
2019	World Championships	Doha, Qatar	21st (sf)	100 m hurdles	13.24
2021	Olympic Games	Tokyo, Japan	29th (h)	100 m hurdles	13.10
2022	World Championships	Eugene, OR, United States	23rd (sf)	100 m hurdles	13.15
2022	European Championships	Munich, Germany	9th (sf)	100 m hurdles	12.95
2023	European Indoor Championships	Istanbul, Turkey	1st	60 m hurdles	7.79 =NR
2023	World Championships	Budapest, Hungary	21st (sf)	100 m hurdles	13.05
2024	World Indoor Championships	Glasgow, United Kingdom	12th (sf)	60 m hurdles	8.00
2024	European Championships	Rome, Italy	6th	100 m hurdles	12.84
2024	Olympic Games	Paris, France	4th (rep)	100 m hurdles	12.83
2025	European Indoor Championships	Apeldoorn, Netherlands	5th	60 m hurdles	8.00

=== National titles ===
- Finnish Athletics Championships
  - 100 m hurdles: 2019
- Finnish Indoor Athletics Championships
  - 60 m hurdles: 2023
  - 4 × 200 m relay: 2013, 2018
