= Jessica Hunter =

British athlete (born 1996)

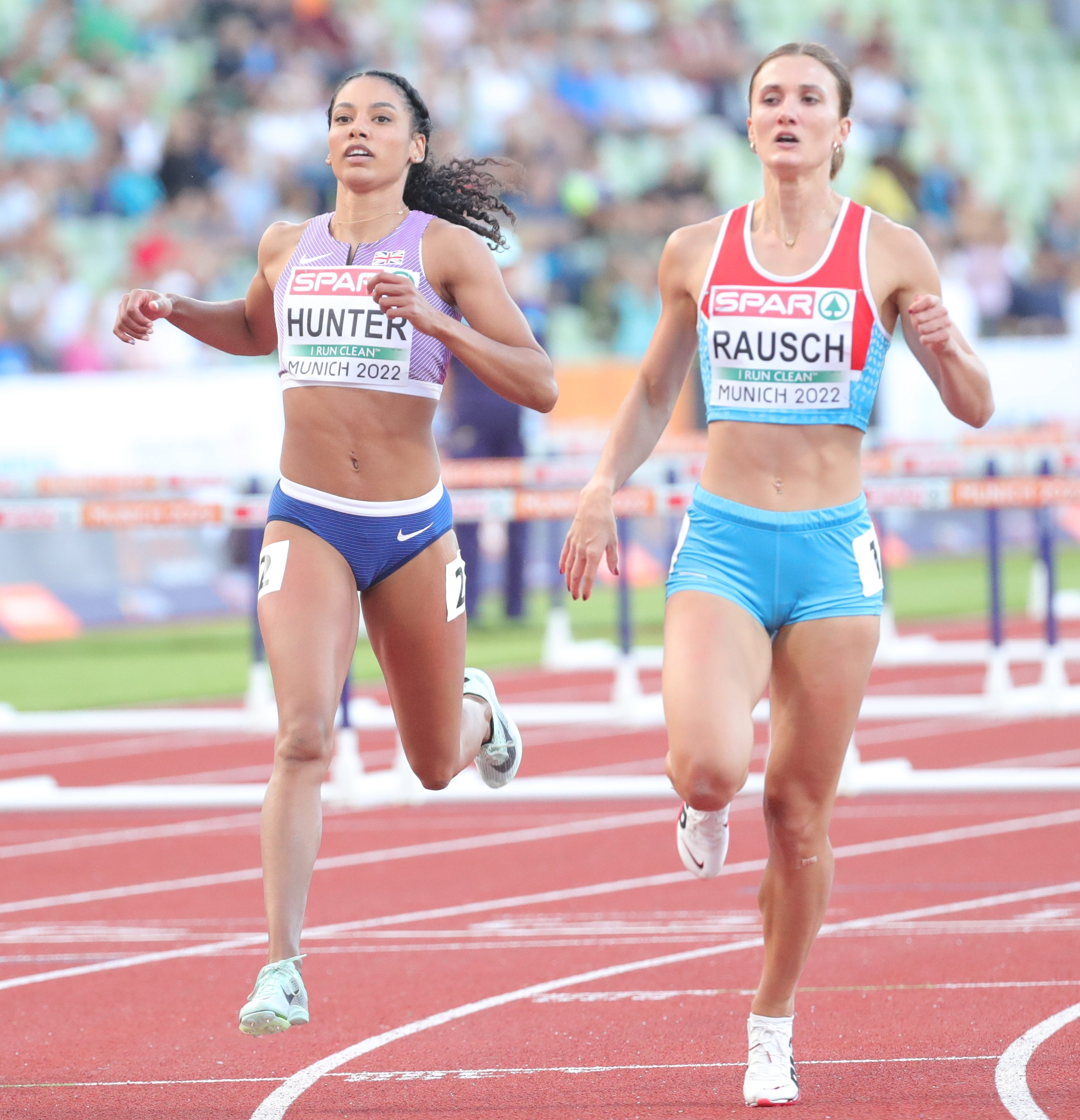
- Hunter at the 2022 European Championships

Personal information
- Nationality: British (English)
- Born: 4 December 1996 (age 29)
- Height: 172 cm (5 ft 8 in)

Sport
- Sport: Athletics
- Event: Hurdles

Achievements and titles
- Personal best(s): 60m hurdles: 8.14 (Århus, 2024); 100m hurdles: 13.12 (Geneva, 2022)

Jessica Hunter (born 4 December 1996) is a British hurdler. She has won multiple medals at British Athletics Championships in the 60 metres hurdles and 100 metres hurdles.

== Early life ==
She attended St Bernard’s Catholic School in High Wycombe, and running for Buckinghamshire, became English schools champion in the 100 metres hurdles. She was brought up in the care system and received funding from Sport England in 2016. She studied sports therapy at the University of Bedfordshire.

== Career ==
Hunter initially competed as a multi-eventer before focusing on the 100m hurdles. She has run as a member of the Vale of Aylesbury Athletic Club. A two-time British Universities (BUCS) champion, Hunter competed at the 2019 Summer Universiade in Naples, reaching the semi-finals.

In June 2022, Hunter finished as runner-up at the 2022 British Athletics Championships in Manchester. Hunter made her senior international debut at the European Athletics Championships in Munich in August 2022. She reached the semi-finals in the 100m Hurdles after winning her qualifying heat.

In January 2024, she set a new 60m hurdles personal best of 8.14 seconds in Aarhus. On 17 February 2024, she qualified for the final at the 2024 British Indoor Athletics Championships in the 60 metres hurdles, finishing third overall in Birmingham.

She ran a time of 13.19 seconds to qualify second-fastest for the final of the 100m hurdles at the 2024 British Athletics Championships in Manchester on 29 June 2024. She placed third in the final.

She finished fourth in the 60 metre hurdles at the 2025 British Indoor Athletics Championships in Birmingham, running a time of 8.29 seconds.
