= Pia Skrzyszowska =

Polish hurdler (born 2001)

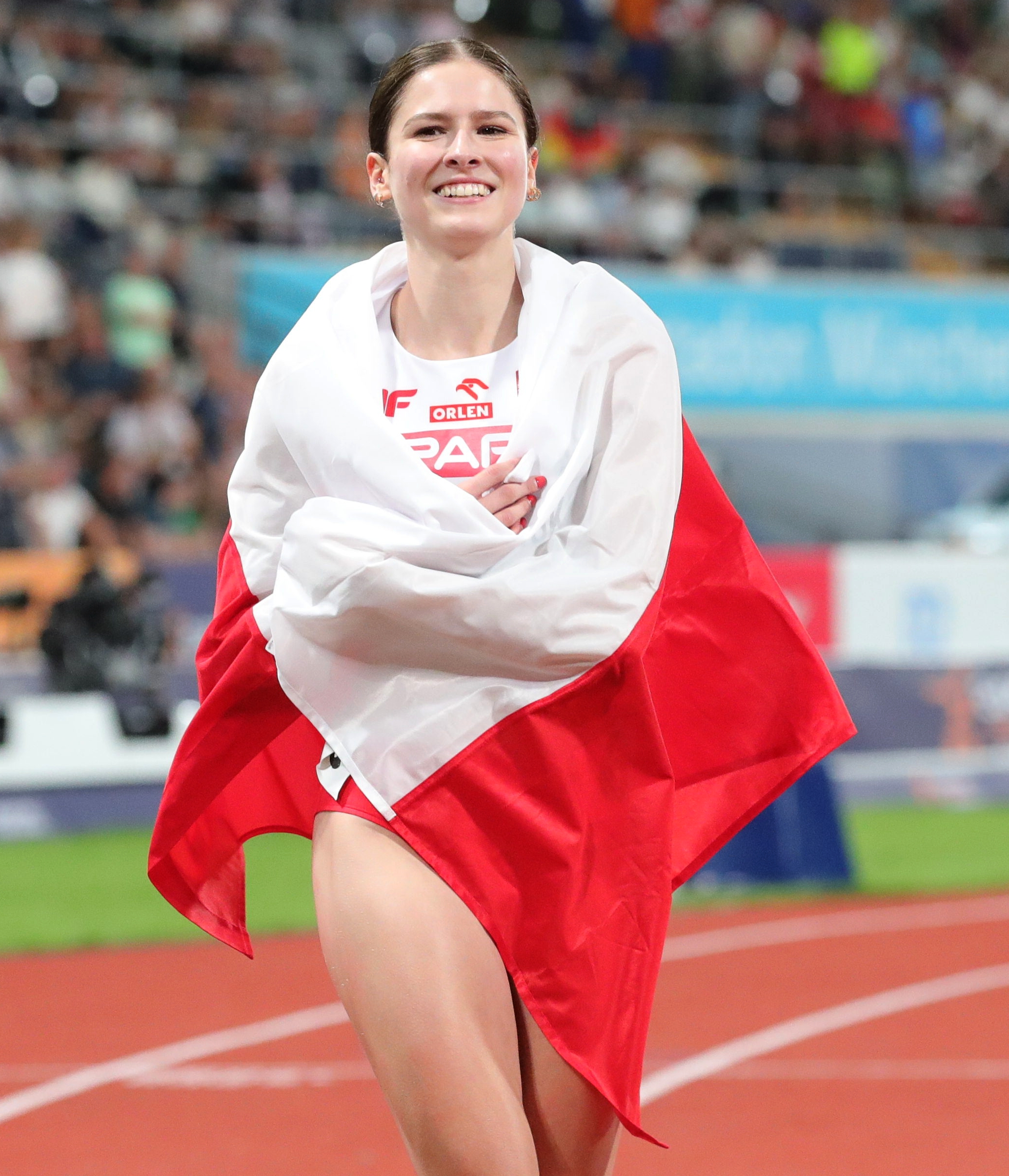
- Pia Skrzyszowska in 2022

Personal information
- Born: 20 April 2001 (age 25) Warsaw, Poland
- Height: 1.67 m (5 ft 6 in)
- Weight: 56 kg (123 lb)

Sport
- Country: Poland
- Sport: Athletics
- Event: 100 m hurdles
- Club: AZS-AWF Warszawa (2019–); OKS Skra Warszawa (–2018)
- Coached by: Jarosław Skrzyszowski (2019–); Przemysław Radkiewicz (-2018); Laurent Meuwly

Achievements and titles
- Personal bests: 100 m hurdles: 12.37 (2024); 100 m: 11.12 (2024); Indoors; 60 m hurdles: 7.73 (2026) NR; 60 m: 7.12 (2022)
Medal record
Women's athletics
Representing Poland
World Indoor Championships
| Bronze medal – third place | 2024 Glasgow | 60 m hurdles |
| Bronze medal – third place | 2026 Toruń | 60 m hurdles |
World Relays
| Silver medal – second place | 2021 Chorzów | 4 × 100 m relay |
European Championships
| Gold medal – first place | 2022 Munich | 100 m hurdles |
| Silver medal – second place | 2022 Munich | 4 × 100 m relay |
| Silver medal – second place | 2026 Birmingham | 100 m hurdles |
| Bronze medal – third place | 2024 Rome | 100 m hurdles |
| Bronze medal – third place | 2026 Birmingham | 4 × 100 m relay |
European Indoor Championships
| Bronze medal – third place | 2025 Apeldoorn | 60 m hurdles |
European Games
| Gold medal – first place | 2023 Kraków–Małopolska | 100 m hurdles |
European U23 Championships
| Gold medal – first place | 2021 Tallinn | 100 m hurdles |
European U20 Championships
| Silver medal – second place | 2019 Borås | 100 m hurdles |

Pia Skrzyszowska (born 20 April 2001) is a Polish athlete specialising in the sprint hurdles. She is a European Championships gold, silver and bronze medallist and European Games gold medallist in the 100 metres hurdles, World Indoor Championships and European Indoor Championships bronze medallist in the 60 m hurdles, and World Relays and European Championships time silver medallist in the 4 × 100 m relay.

Skrzyszowska is also a European U23 Championships gold medallist and European U20 Championships silver medallist in the 100 m hurdles. She is a three-time Polish national champion and holds the national record in the 60 m hurdles. Skrzyszowska is a two-time Olympian and competed at the 2020 and 2024 Summer Olympics.

== Career ==
Skrzyszowska's mother, Jolanta Bartczak, is a former Olympic long jumper and 1988 European Indoor Championship bronze medallist.

Skrzyszowska won the silver medal in the 100 metres hurdles at the 2019 European Under-20 Championships held in Borås, Sweden, at the age of 18.

Aged 19, she finished fifth in the 60 metres hurdles at the 2021 European Indoor Championships on home soil in Toruń. She won the gold medal in the 100 m hurdles at the European Under-23 Championships in Tallinn, Estonia that year.

In 2022, Skrzyszowska became triple Polish national champion. At the European Athletics Championships held in August in Munich, she claimed her first major senior title, with gold in the 100 m hurdles in a time of 12.53 seconds. She added silver for the women's 4 × 100 m relay alongside Anna Kiełbasińska, Marika Popowicz-Drapała and Ewa Swoboda.

In her 2023 season's debut on 29 January, Skrzyszowska won the 60 m hurdles at the ISTAF Indoor Düsseldorf in Germany in a personal best of 7.84 seconds. Just a few days later, she produced a world-leading 7.78 s at the Orlen Cup on home soil in Łódź to come within hundredth of a second of Polish record set by Zofia Bielczyk in 1980. At the 2023 European Games, Skrzyszowska won the women's 100 metres hurdles in Chorzów, in 12.77 seconds.

In 2024, she set her personal best in the 100 m hurdles with a time of 12.37 seconds in La Chaux-de-Fonds.

On 12 August 2026, Skrzyszowska won the silver medal in the 100 metres hurdles at the European Championships in Birmingham, England.

== Achievements ==
=== Personal bests ===
- 60 m hurdles – 7.73 (Toruń, 2026) NR
- 60 metres indoor – 7.12 (Toruń 2022)

- 100 m hurdles – 12.37 (La Chaux-de-Fonds, 2024)
  - 100 m hurdles (76.2 cm) – 13.35 (+1.2 m/s, Warsaw 2018) NU18R
- 100 metres – 11.12 (+1.4 m/s, Kalamata 2022)

=== International competitions ===
Representing Poland
| Year | Competition | Venue | Position | Event | Time |
|---|---|---|---|---|---|
| 2017 | Youth Olympic Festival | Győr, Hungary | – | 100 m hurdles (76.2 cm) | DNF |
| 2017 | Youth Olympic Festival | Győr, Hungary | 6th | 4 × 100 m relay | 47.84 |
| 2018 | European U18 Championships | Győr, Hungary | 13th (sf) | 100 m | 11.94 |
| 2018 | European U18 Championships | Győr, Hungary | 8th | 200 m | 24.63 |
| 2018 | World U20 Championships | Tampere, Finland | 5th | 4 × 100 m relay | 44.61 SB |
| 2018 | Youth Olympic Games | Buenos Aires, Argentina | 6th | 200 m | 48.46^{1} |
| 2019 | European U20 Championships | Borås, Sweden | 2nd | 100 m hurdles | 13.35 |
| 2019 | European U20 Championships | Borås, Sweden | 6th | 4 × 100 m relay | 44.72 |
| 2021 | European Indoor Championships | Toruń, Poland | 5th | 60 m hurdles | 7.95 |
| 2021 | World Relays | Chorzów, Poland | 2nd | 4 × 100 m relay | 44.10 |
| 2021 | European Team Championships Super League | Chorzów, Poland | 1st | 100 m | 11.25 EU23L |
| 2021 | European Team Championships Super League | Chorzów, Poland | 1st | 100 m hurdles | 12.99 |
| 2021 | European U23 Championships | Tallinn, Estonia | 1st | 100 m hurdles | 12.77 |
| 2021 | Olympic Games | Tokyo, Japan | 19th (sf) | 100 m hurdles | 12.89 |
| 2021 | Olympic Games | Tokyo, Japan | 10th (h) | 4 × 100 m relay | 43.09 |
| 2022 | World Indoor Championships | Belgrade, Serbia | 14th (sf) | 60 m | 7.17 |
| 2022 | World Championships | Eugene, OR, United States | 10th (sf) | 100 m hurdles | 12.62 |
| 2022 | European Championships | Munich, Germany | 1st | 100 m hurdles | 12.53 |
| 2022 | European Championships | Munich, Germany | 2nd | 4 × 100 m relay | 42.61 NR |
| 2023 | World Championships | Budapest, Hungary | 12th (sf) | 100 m hurdles | 12.71 |
| 2023 | World Championships | Budapest, Hungary | 5th | 4 × 100 m relay | 42.66 |
| 2024 | World Indoor Championships | Glasgow, United Kingdom | 3rd | 60 m hurdles | 7.79 |
| 2024 | European Championships | Rome, Italy | 3rd | 100 m hurdles | 12.42 PB |
| 2024 | Olympic Games | Paris, France | 9th (sf) | 100 m hurdles | 12.55 |
| 2025 | European Indoor Championships | Apeldoorn, Netherlands | 3rd | 60 m hurdles | 7.83 |
| 2025 | World Indoor Championships | Nanjing, China | 4th | 60 m hurdles | 7.74 NR |
| 2025 | World Championships | Tokyo, Japan | 5th | 100 m hurdles | 12.49 |
| 2025 | World Championships | Tokyo, Japan | 8th (h) | 4 × 100 m relay | 42.83^{2} |
| 2026 | World Indoor Championships | Toruń, Poland | 3rd | 60 m hurdles | 7.73 |
| 2026 | European Championships | Birmingham, United Kingdom | 2nd | 100 m hurdles | 12.67 |
| 2026 | European Championships | Birmingham, United Kingdom | 3rd | 4 × 100 m relay | 43.15 |
| 2026 | World Ultimate Championship | Budapest, Hungary | 7th | 100 m hurdles | 12.52 |

^{1}Sum of two times
^{2}Disqualified in the final

=== National titles ===
- Polish Athletics Championships
  - 100 metres hurdles: 2021, 2022
  - 100 metres: 2021
