= Stanislava Škvarková =

Slovak hurdler

Personal information
- Nationality: Slovak
- Born: 20 April 1996 (age 29)

Sport
- Sport: Athletics
- Event: Hurdles

Stanislava Škvarková (born 20 April 1996) is a Slovak athlete. She competed in the women's 100 metres hurdles event at the 2019 World Athletics Championships.
