= Luminosa Bogliolo =

Italian hurdler (born 1995)

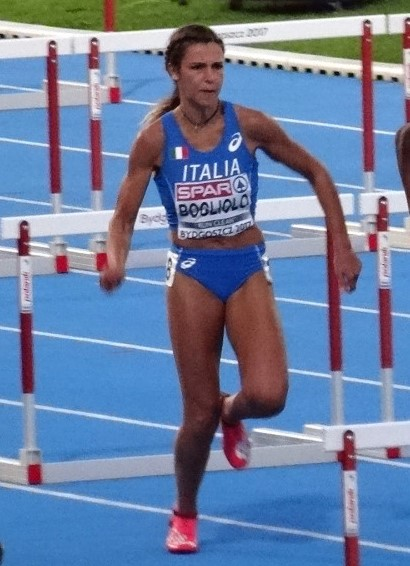

Personal information
- Nationality: Italian
- Born: 3 July 1995 (age 31) Albenga, Italy
- Height: 1.70 m (5 ft 7 in)
- Weight: 60 kg (132 lb)

Sport
- Country: Italy
- Sport: Track and field
- Event: 100 metres hurdles
- Club: Cus Genova; G.S. Fiamme Oro (2019-)
- Coached by: Ezio Madonia

Achievements and titles
- Personal bests: 100 m hs: 12.75 (2021); 60 m hs: 7.99 (2021)
Medal record
European Team Championships
| Gold medal – first place | 2019 Bydgoszcz | 100 m hs |
| Silver medal – second place | 2021 Silesia | 100 m hs |
Universiade
| Gold medal – first place | 2019 Naples | 100 m hs |
Mediterranean Games
| Silver medal – second place | 2018 Tarragona | 100 m hs |

Luminosa Bogliolo (born 3 July 1995) is an Italian hurdler who won a gold medal at the 2019 Summer Universiade and a silver medal at the 2018 Mediterranean Games.

In 2020 Bogliolo, winning BAUHAUS-galan in Stockholm, became the first Italian female in history to win a stage in the Diamond League. She competed at the 2020 Summer Olympics, in 100 m hurdles.

== Biography ==
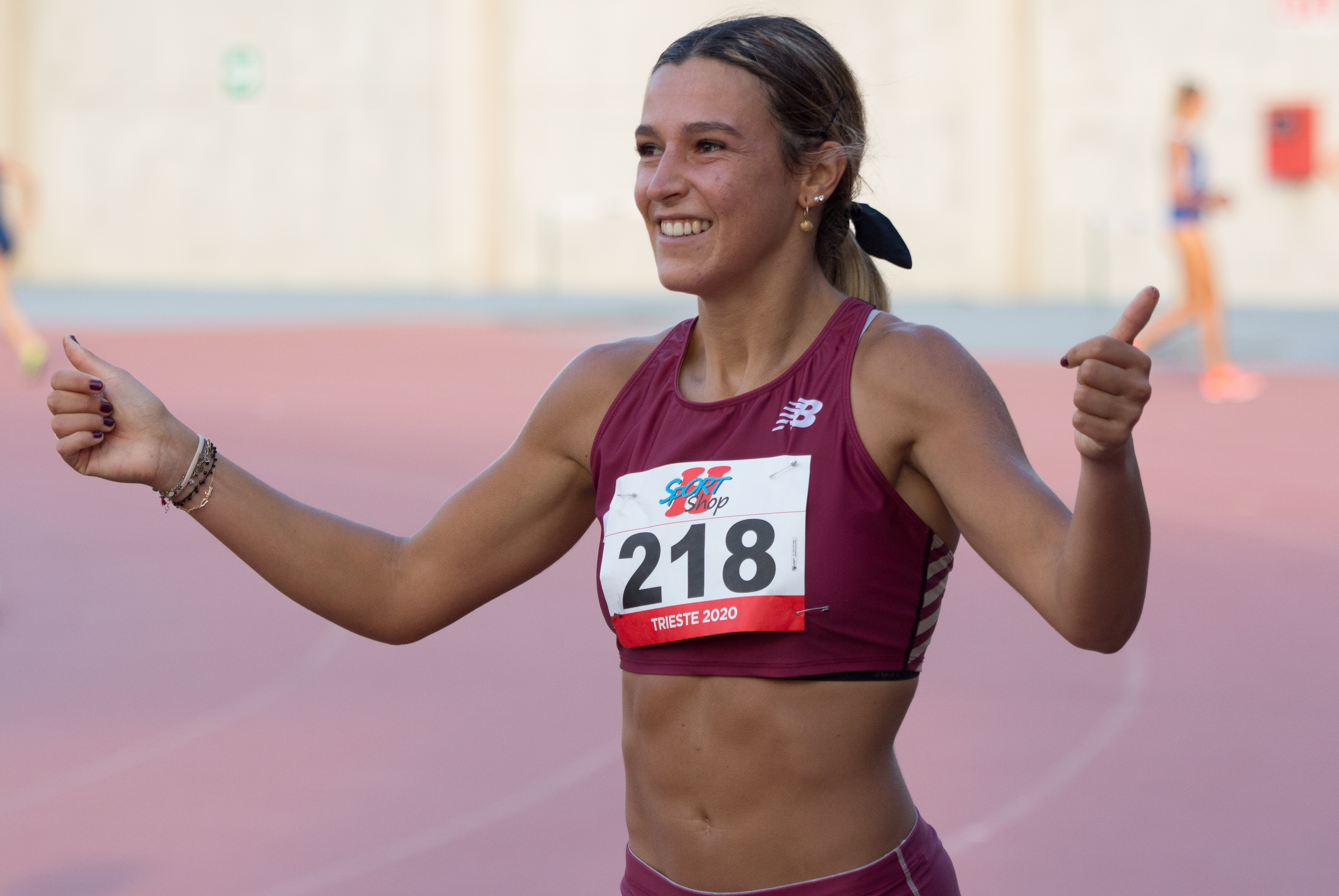
Luminosa Bogliolo at the 2020 Triveneto Meeting in Trieste, Italy.

=== 2018 ===
In 2018, she established her personal best on 100 metres hurdles with 12.99. On 23 May 2018 she reached the 13th place in the seasonal European lists, thus obtaining the EAA standard and the selection for the 2018 European Athletics Championships.

In September she won in Pescara, her first national championship.

=== 2019 ===
She obtained two other results under 13 seconds, but with a wind higher than the norm of +2.0 mps.

Best time

| Date | Competition | Venue | Position | Time | Wind | Note |
|---|---|---|---|---|---|---|
| 22 June | Meeting Stanislas | Nancy, France | 1st | 12.89 | +0.6 | |
| 30 June | Résisprint International | La Chaux-de-Fonds, Switzerland | 1st | 12.78 | +1.2 | PB (Note: Heats) |
| 11 July | Universiade | Naples, Italy | 1st | 12.86 | -0.9 | (Note: Semi-final) |
| 11 July | Universiade | Naples, Italy | 1st | 12.79 | +0.6 | (Note: Final) |
| 25 July | Italian Athletics Championships | Brixen, Italy | 1st | 12.83 | +0.3 | |
| 9 August | European Team Championships | Bydgoszcz, Poland | 1st | 12.83 | +0.3 | |
| 11 August | European Team Championships | Bydgoszcz, Poland | 1st | 12.87 | -1.2 | |
| 14 September | Memorial Kamila Skolimowska | Chorzów, Poland | 1st | 12.84 | +0.1 | |
| 5 October | World Championships | Doha, Qatar | 1st | 12.80 | +0.2 | |

=== 2021 ===
The outdoor season started on 13 May in Savona, Italy with a time of 12.84.

== National records ==
- 100 metres hurdles: 12.75 - (Italy) Tokyo, 1 August 2021

== Personal bests ==
- 100 metres hurdles: 12.75 - (Italy) Tokyo, 1 August 2021
- 60 metres hurdles: 8.10 - (Italy) Ancona, 16 February 2019

== Achievements ==
| Year | Competition | Venue | Position | Event | Time | Notes |
|---|---|---|---|---|---|---|
| 2017 | European U23 Championships | Bydgoszcz, Poland | SF | 100 m hs | 13.50 | |
| 2017 | Universiade | Taipei, Taiwan | SF | 100 m hs | 13.99 | |
| 2018 | Mediterranean Games | Tarragona, Spain | 2nd | 100 m hs | 13.30 | |
| 2018 | European Championships | Berlin, Germany | SF (15th) | 100 m hs | 13.09 | |
| 2019 | Universiade | Naples, Italy | 1st | 100 m hs | 12.79 | |
| 2019 | European Team Championships | Bydgoszcz, Poland | 1st | 100 m hs | 12.87 | (Note: She ran a better crono (12.83) in semi-finals) |
| 2019 | World Championships | Doha, Qatar | SF (18th) | 100 m hs | 13.06 | (Note: She ran a better crono (12.80) in semi-finals) |
| 2021 | European Indoor Championships | Toruń, Poland | 6th | 60 m hs | 7.99 | PB (Note: Also in semifinal.) |

== National titles ==
Bogliolo won five national championships at individual senior level.

- Italian Athletics Championships
  - 100 m hurdles: 2018, 2019, 2020, 2021 (4)
- Italian Athletics Indoor Championships
  - 60 m hurdles: 2019 (1)

== Personal life ==
She is engaged to the hurdler Lorenzo Perini.

== See also ==
- Italian all-time lists - 100 metres hurdles
- Italy at the 2018 Mediterranean Games
