= Elisa Di Lazzaro =

Italian hurdler (born 1998)

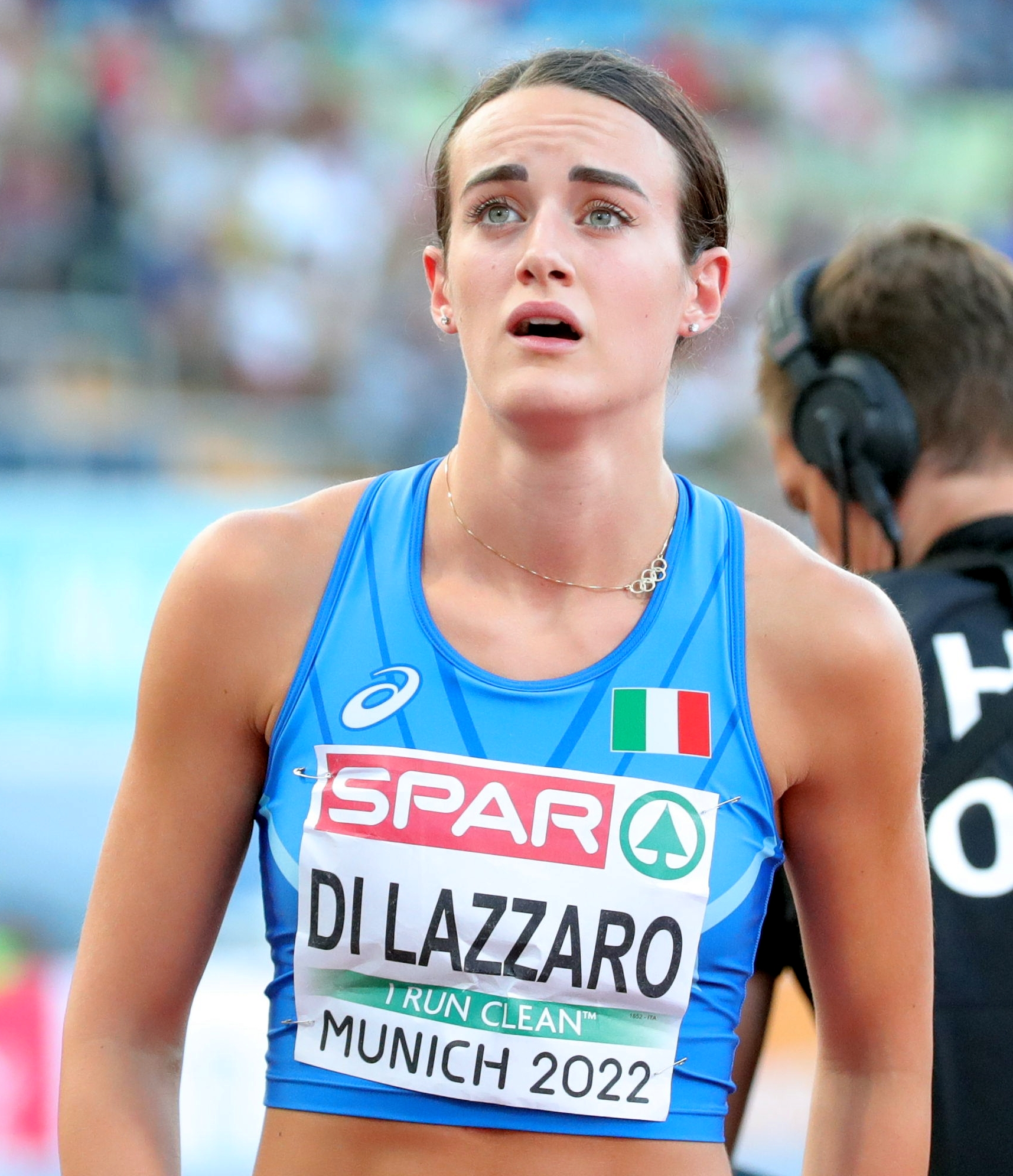
- Di Lazzaro in 2022

Personal information
- Full name: Elisa Maria Di Lazzaro
- National team: Italy
- Born: 5 June 1998 (age 28) Trieste, Italy
- Height: 1.79 m (5 ft 10 in)
- Weight: 61 kg (134 lb)

Sport
- Sport: Athletics
- Event: Hurdling
- Club: Cral Trasporti; Cus Parma; C.S. Carabinieri
- Coached by: Stefano Lubiana; Maurizio Pratizzoli; Santiago Antunez

Achievements and titles
- Personal bests: 60 m hs: 8.12 (2021); 100 m hs: 12.90 (2021)
Medal record
Mediterranean U23 Championships
| Silver medal – second place | 2018 Jesolo | 100 m hs |

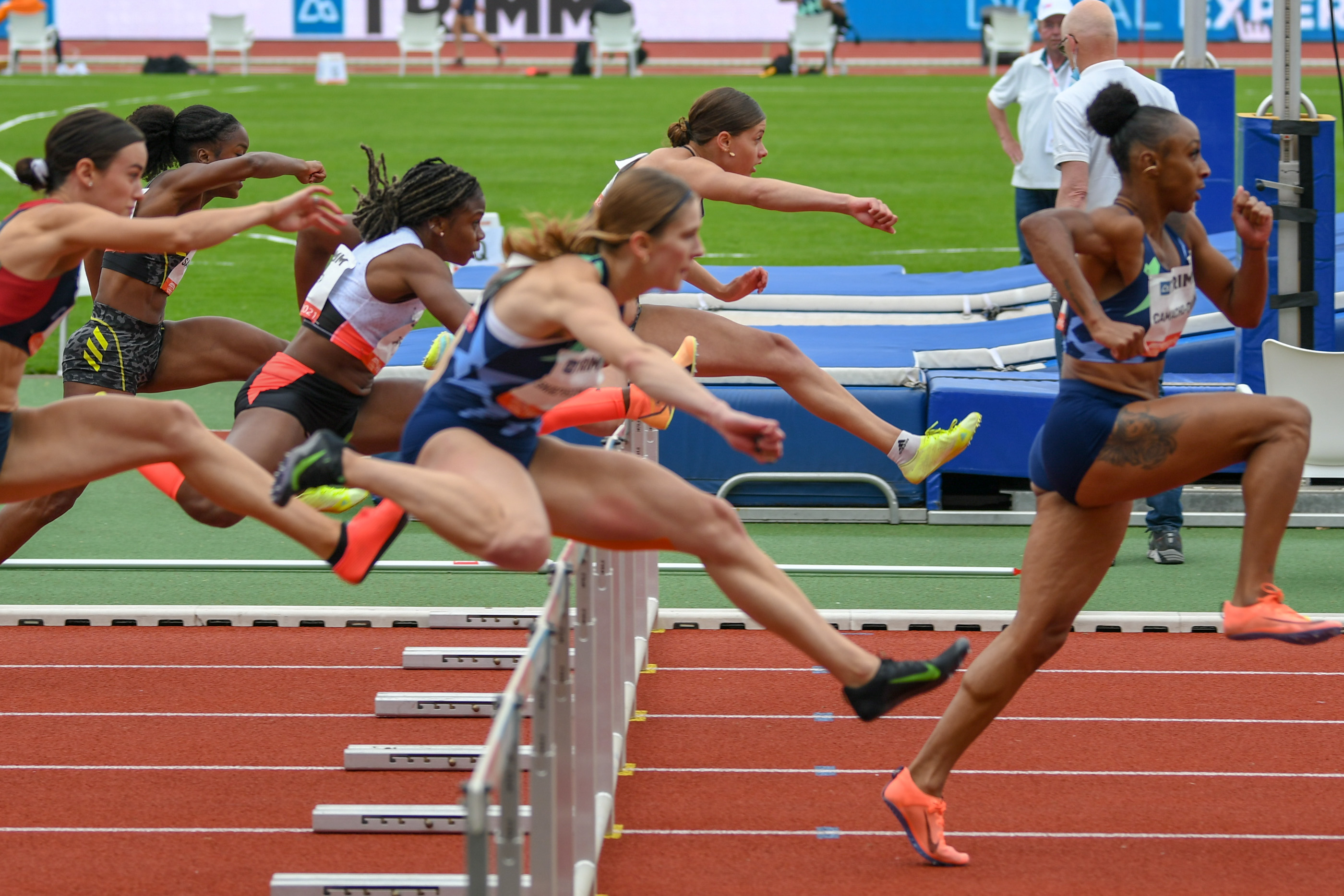
Di Lazzaro (first from left in red & blue jersey) at the FBK-Games 2021.

Elisa Maria Di Lazzaro (born 5 June 1998) is an Italian hurdler, who participated at the 2018 World Indoor Championships in Athletics. She competed at the 2020 Summer Olympics, in 100 m hurdles.

== Personal bests ==
- 60 metres hurdles indoor: 8.12 (Toruń, Poland, 7 March 2021)
- 100 metres hurdles: 12.90 (Savona, Italy, 13 May 2021)

== Achievements ==
| Year | Competition | Venue | Position | Event | Time | Notes |
|---|---|---|---|---|---|---|
| 2017 | European U20 Championships | (Italy) Grosseto | 4th | 100 m hs | 13.43 | |
| 2018 | World Indoor Championships | (United Kingdom) Birmingham | Heat | 60 m hs | 8.35 | |
| 2018 | Mediterranean U23 Championships | (Italy) Jesolo | 2nd | 100 m hs | 13.22 | |
| 2018 | European Championships | (Germany) Berlin | Heat | 100 m hs | 13.42 | |
| 2021 | European Indoor Championships | (Poland) Toruń | Semifinal | 60 m hs | 8.12 | PB |

== National titles ==
She has won four national championships at individual senior level.

- Italian Athletics Championships
  - 100 metres hurdles: 2022
- Italian Athletics Indoor Championships
  - 60 metres hurdles: 2017, 2021, 2022

== See also ==
- Italian all-time lists - 100 metres hurdles
- Italy at the IAAF World Indoor Championships
