= Mette Graversgaard =

Danish sprinter (born 1995)

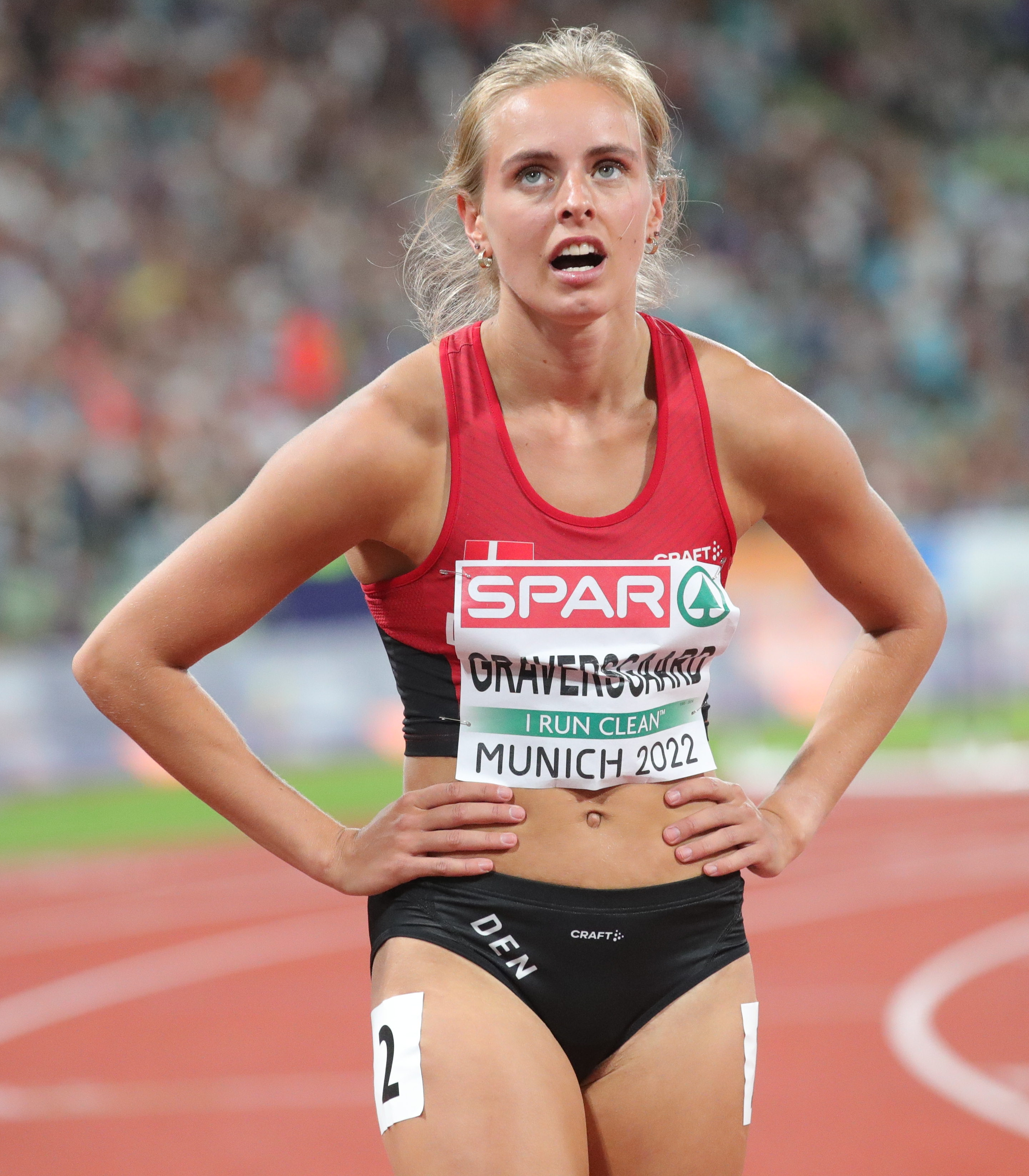
- Graversgaard in 2022

Personal information
- Full name: Mette Laugesen Graversgaard
- Nationality: Danish
- Born: 5 October 1995 (age 30)
- Home town: Aarhus, Denmark

Sport
- Country: Denmark
- Sport: Athletics
- Event: Hurdling

Mette Laugesen Graversgaard (born 5 October 1995) is a Danish athlete who specialises in the 60 metres hurdles and 100 metres hurdles. She has competed for Denmark at multiple major championships, placing fourth in the 60m hurdles at the 2023 European Athletics Indoor Championships.

== Career ==
She started in athletics in multi-events, but switched to sprint hurdles in 2015. She competed in the women's 4 × 100 metres relay at the 2019 World Athletics Championships,

She was selected for the women's 4 x 100 metres relay team at the delayed 2020 Olympic Games in Tokyo, Japan in 2021, but had to return home from her trip to the Games after suffering a thigh injury in training.

She competed at the 100 metres hurdles at the 2022 World Athletics Championships held in Eugene, Oregon. She finished sixth in the final of the 100 metres hurdles at the 2022 European Athletics Championships in Munich, Germany.

She finished fourth in the final of the 60 metres hurdles at the 2023 World Athletics Indoor Championships in Istanbul, Turkey, where she ran a Danish national record time of 7.92 seconds. Graversgaard won the Danish Athletic Championships in both the 100 metres hurdles and the 100 metres sprint in 2023. That year, she lowered her national record for the 100m hurdles to 12.83 seconds. She qualified for the semi-finals at the 2023 World Athletics Championships in Budapest, Hungary.

She was selected to compete at the 2024 World Athletics Indoor Championships in Glasgow, Scotland, reaching the semi-finals. She competed at the 2024 European Athletics Championships in Rome, Italy, where she did not reach the semi-finals. She won the final of the 100 metres hurdles at the Danish Athletics Championships in June 2024.
