= List of people from Rostov-on-Don =

Coat of Arms of Rostov-on-Don

This is a list of notable people who were born or have lived in Rostov-on-Don, Russia.

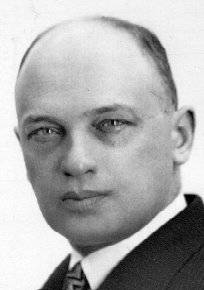
Savielly Tartakower (1887–1956)

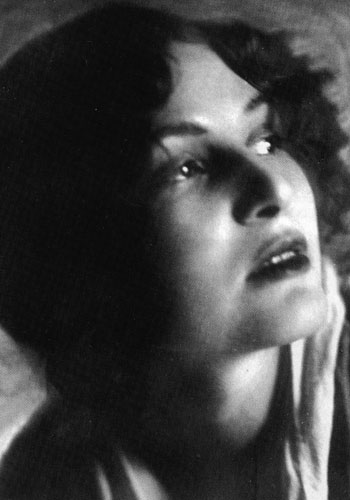
Zinaida Reich (1894–1939)

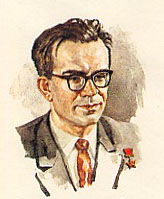
Victor Glushkov (1923–1982)

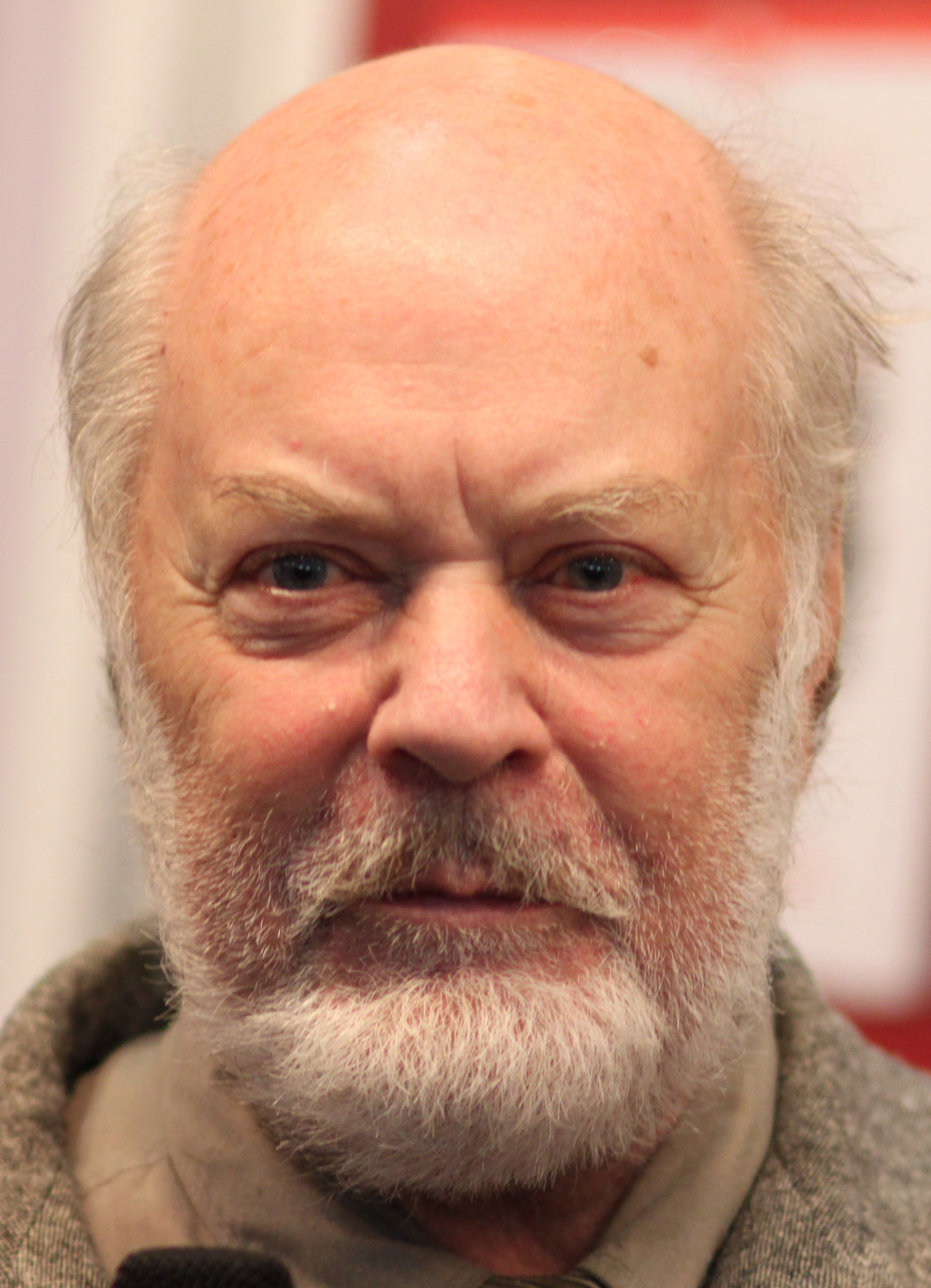
Lev Anninsky (1934–2019)

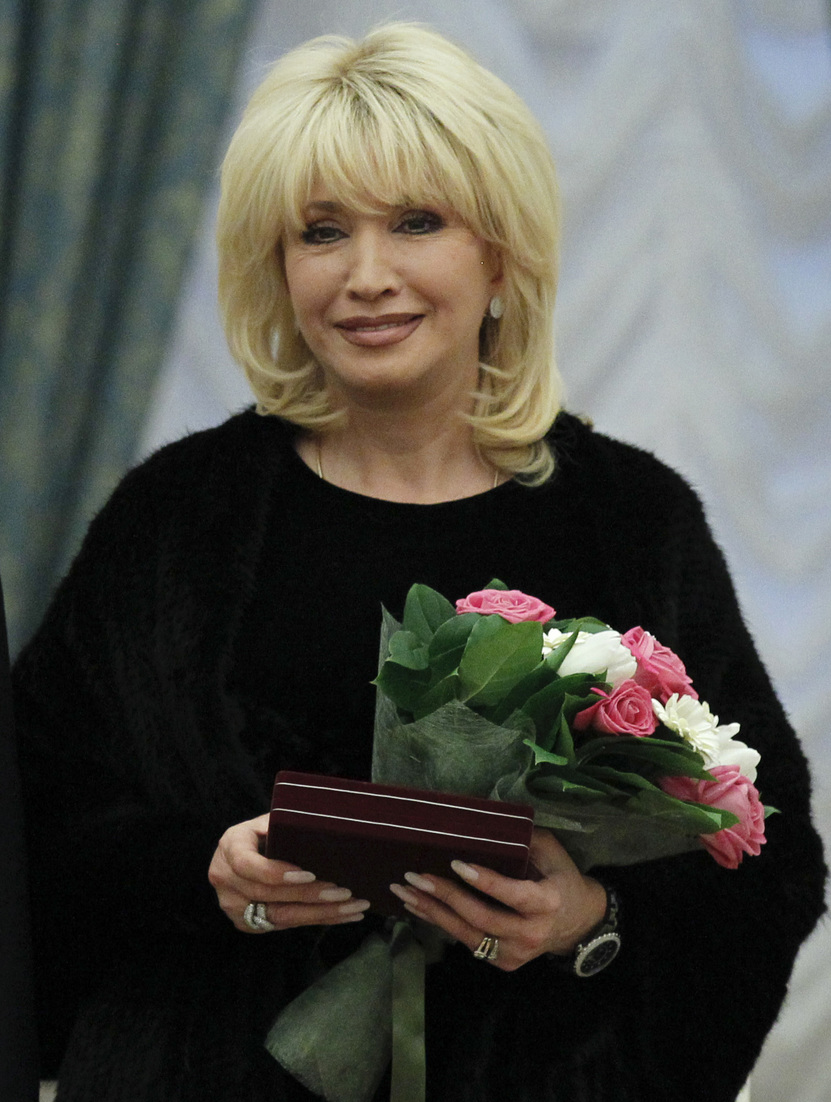
Irina Allegrova (born 1952)

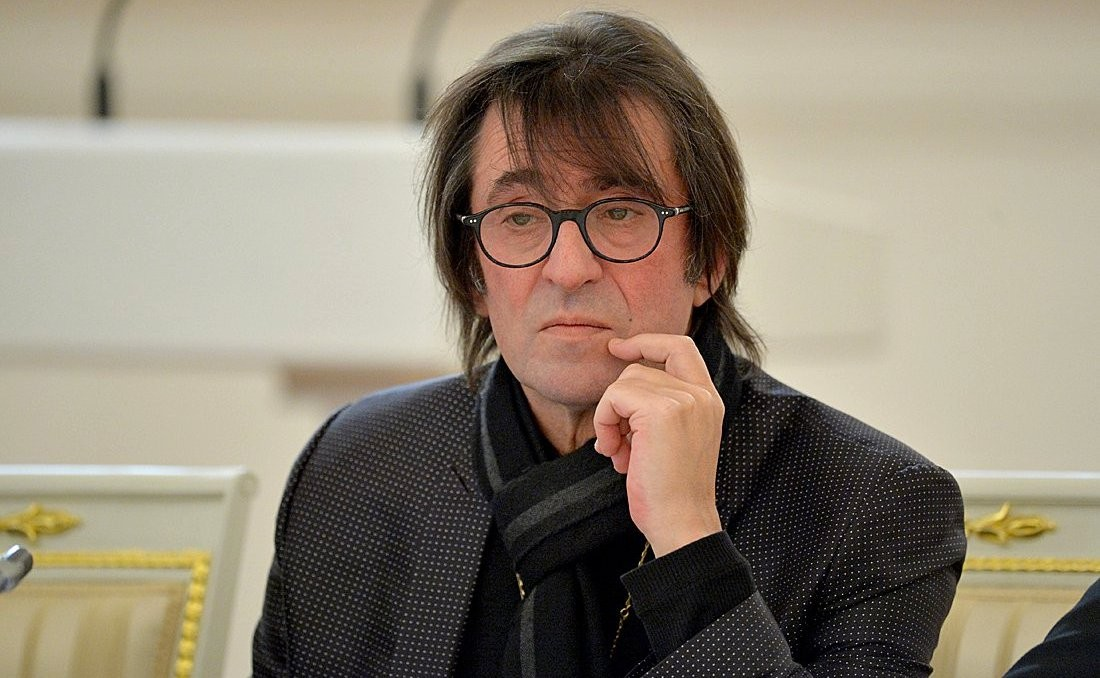
Yuri Bashmet (born 1953)

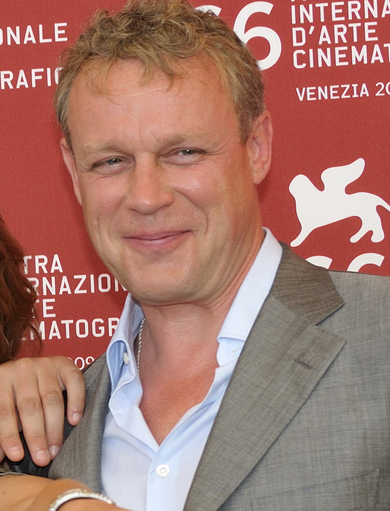
Sergey Zhigunov (born 1963)

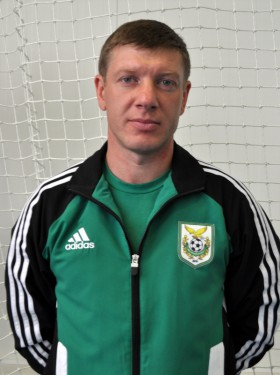
Anatoly Morozov (born 1973)

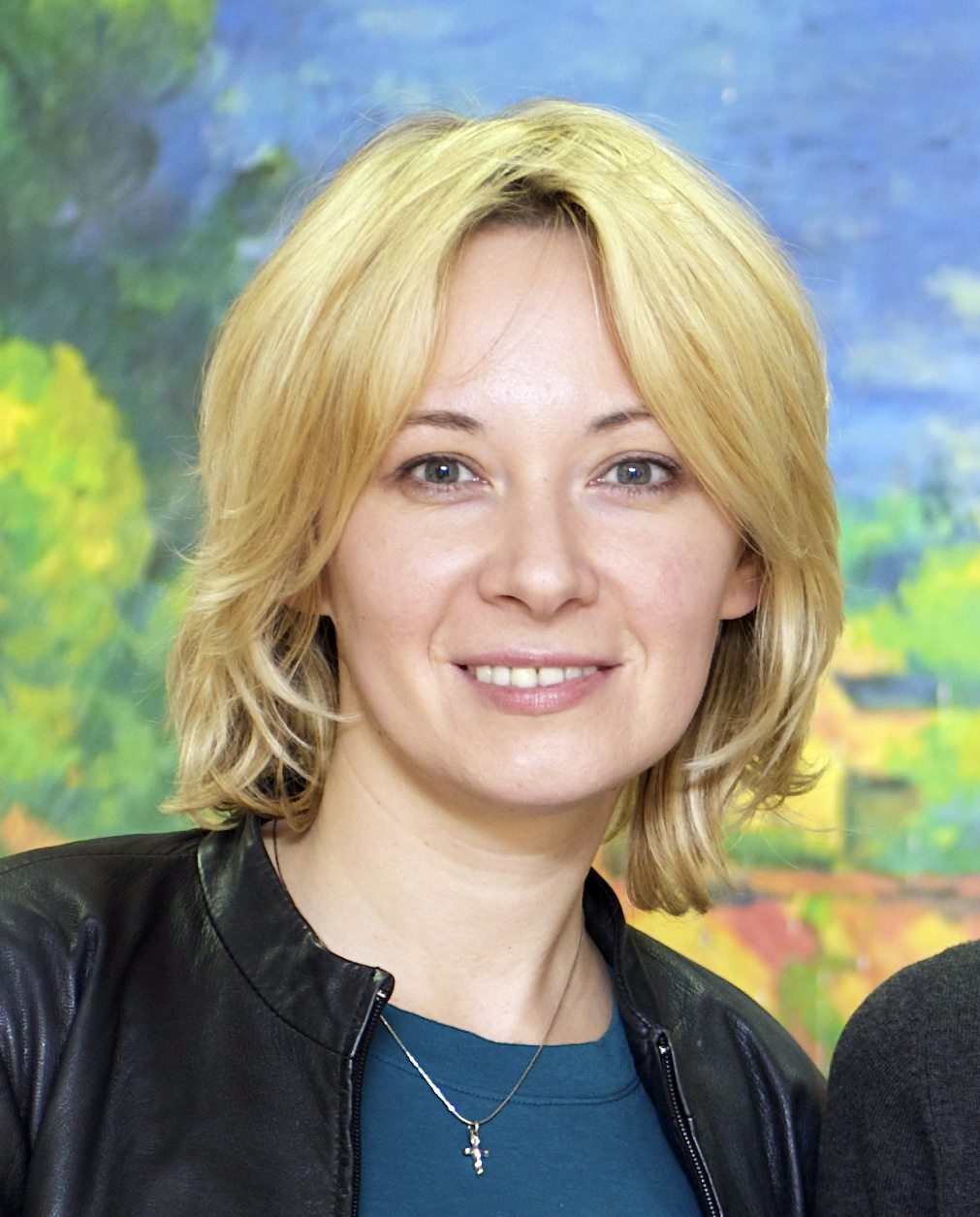
Angelina Nikonova (born 1976)

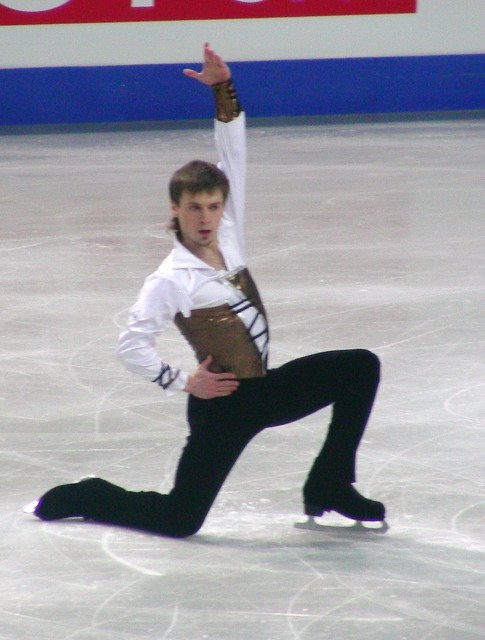
Sergei Davydov (born 1979)

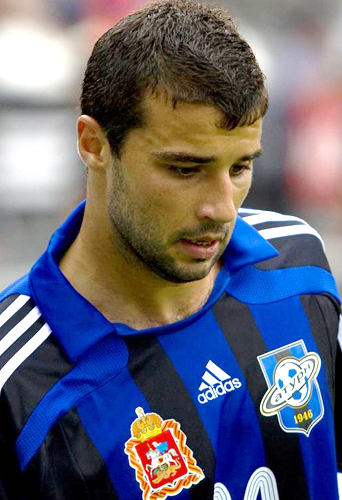
Alexei Eremenko (born 1983)

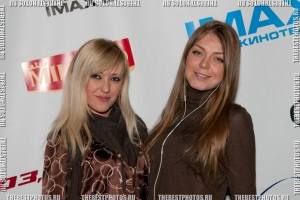
Oksana Pochepa (born 1984)

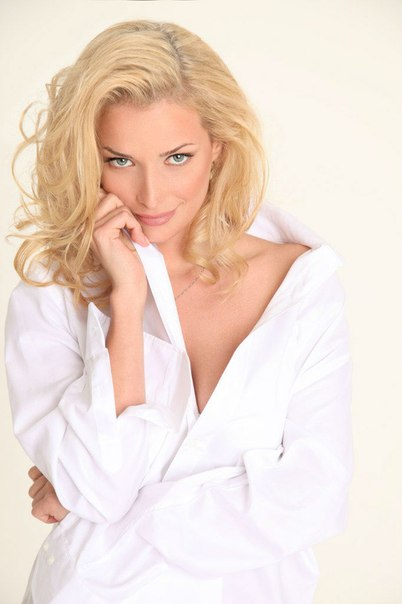
Tatiana Kotova (born 1985)

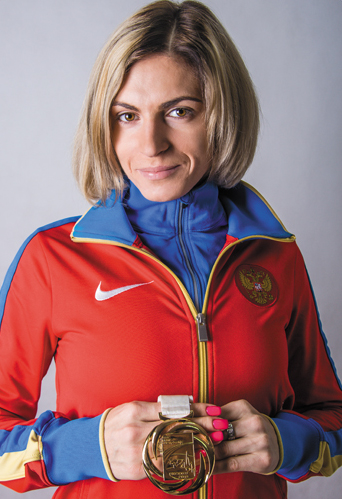
Antonina Krivoshapka (born 1987)

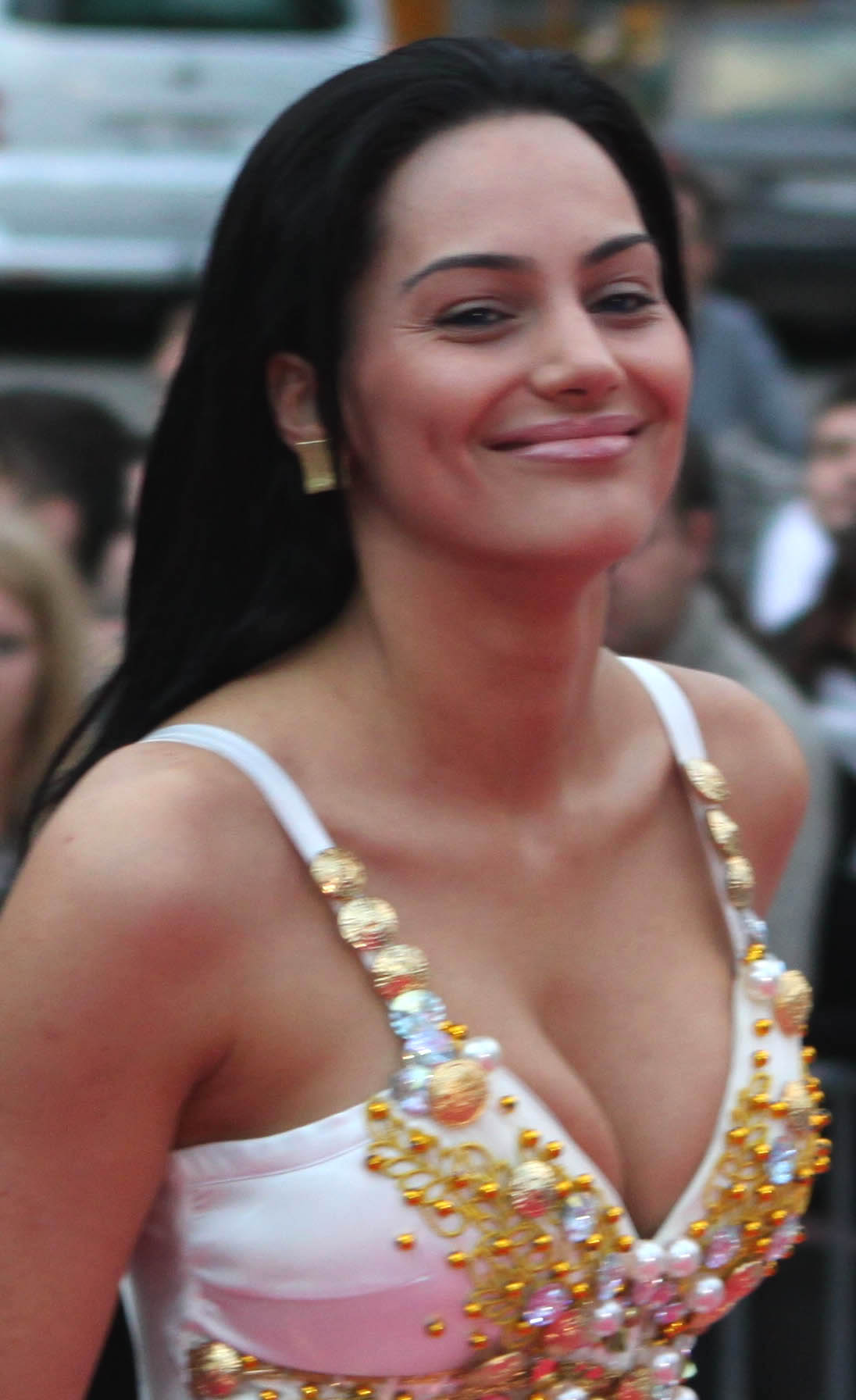
Eva Rivas (born 1987)

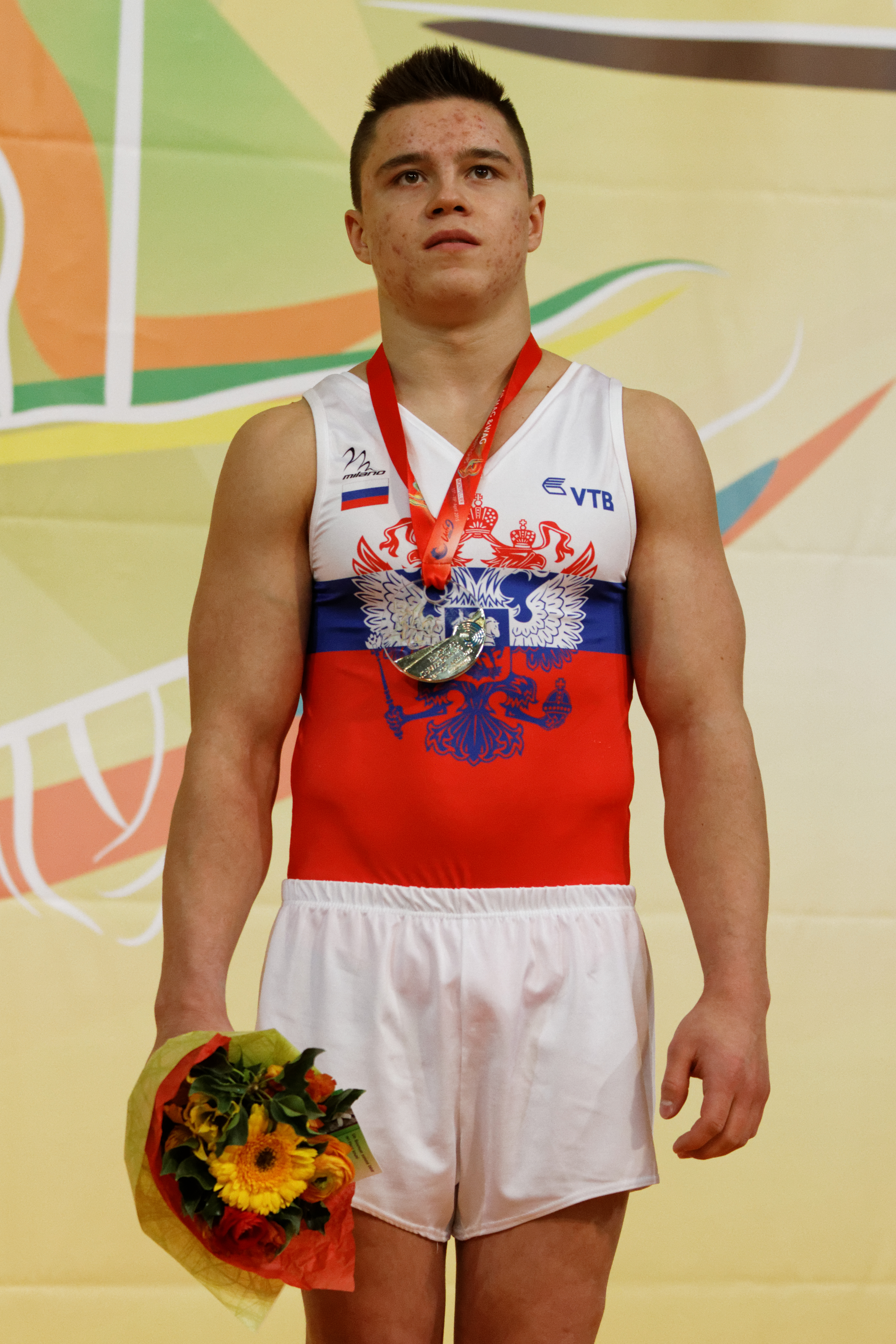
Nikita Nagornyy (born 1997)

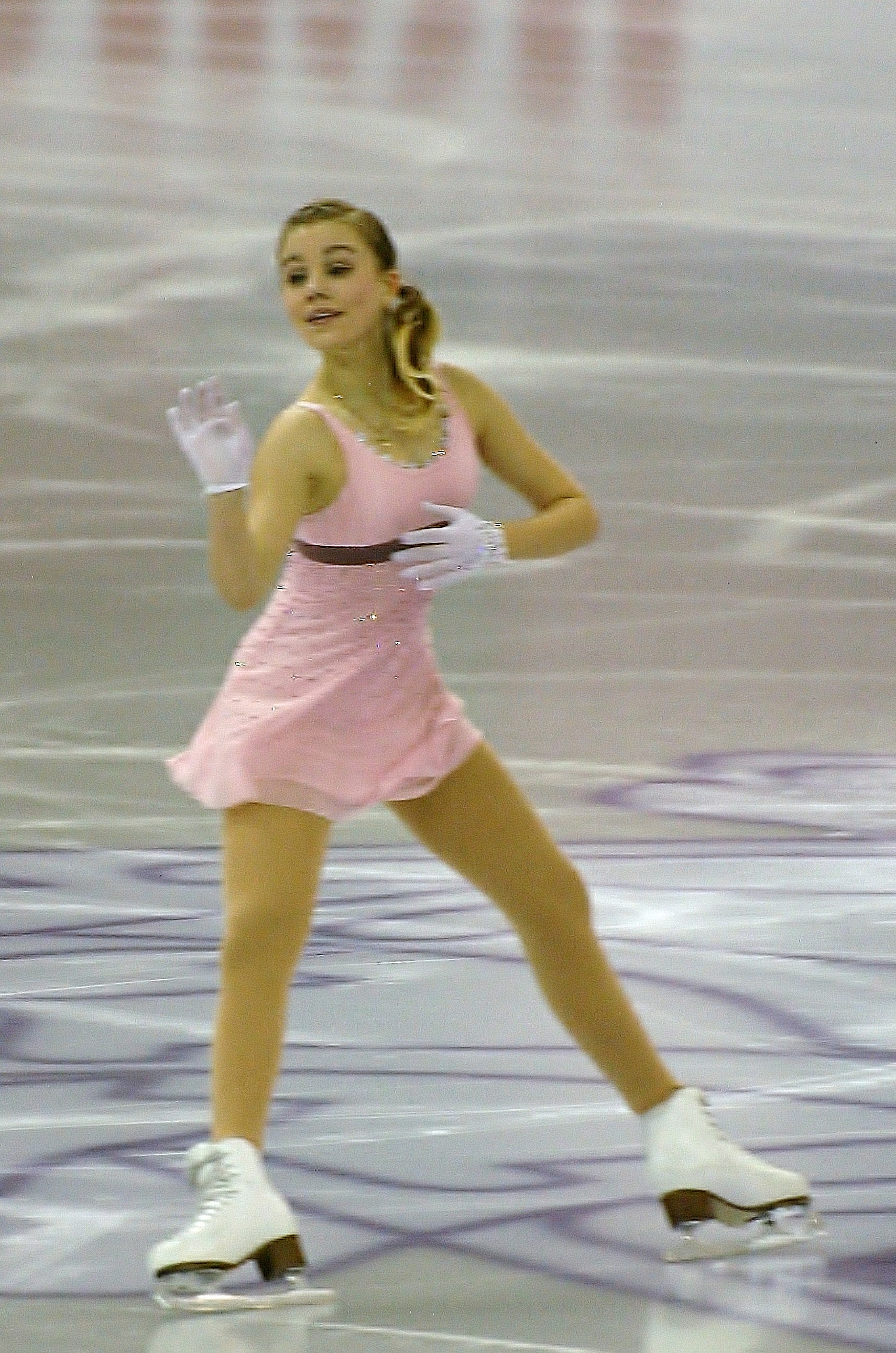
Alisa Fedichkina (born 2002)

== Born in Rostov-on-Don ==
=== 19th century ===
==== 1801–1890 ====
- George VI of Armenia (1868–1954), Catholicos of the Armenian Apostolic Church from 1945 to 1954
- Mykola Voronyi (1871–1938), Ukrainian poet
- Mikhail Bernshtein (1875–1960), Russian and Soviet painter and art educator
- Martiros Saryan (1880–1972), Soviet Armenian painter
- Mikhail Gnessin (1883–1957), Russian composer and teacher
- Raïssa Maritain (1883–1960), Russian-born French poet and philosopher
- Alexander Schapiro (1883–1946), Russian Jewish anarcho-syndicalist militant active in the international anarchist movement
- Sophie Liebknecht (1884–1964), Russian-born German socialist and feminist
- Sabina Spielrein (1885–1942), Russian physician and one of the first female psychoanalysts
- Jerzy Żurawlew (1886–1980), Polish pianist, conductor, teacher
- Savielly Tartakower (1887–1956), Polish and French chess grandmaster
- Efrem Zimbalist (1889–1985), concert violinist, composer, teacher, conductor and director of the Curtis Institute of Music

==== 1891–1900 ====
- Yakov Frenkel (1894–1952), Soviet physicist
- Zinaida Reich (1894–1939), Russian actress
- Nikolay Bestchetvertnoi (1895–1937), Russian revolutionary, bolshevik
- Olga Spessivtseva (1895–1991), Russian ballerina
- Daniel Guilet (1899–1990), French and American classical violinist
- Avet Ter-Gabrielyan (1899–1983), Armenian violinist
- Izabella Yurieva (1899–2000), Russian singer
- Roman Chatov (1900–1987), Russian-born American artist, painter, designer, and illustrator
- Evgeny Henkin (1900-1938), a notable photographer and musician playing the theremin, active in Berlin in the 1930s

=== 20th century ===
==== 1901–1910 ====
- Marion Gering (1901–1977), Russian-born American stage producer and director
- Boris Shpitalniy (1902–1972), Soviet designer of aircraft guns and cannons
- Yevgeny Brusilovsky (1905–1981), Soviet Russian composer
- Vera Panova (1905–1973), Soviet novelist, playwright and journalist
- Leonid Sedov (1907–1999), leading physicist of the Soviet Union
- Rostislav Plyatt (1908–1989), Russian-born Soviet film and television actor
- John Travlos (1908–1985), Greek architect, architectural historian and archaeologist
- Tsezar Kunikov (1909–1943), officer in the Soviet Naval Infantry; Hero of the Soviet Union
- Aleksandr Laktionov (1910–1972), Socialist realism painter in the post-war Soviet Union
- David Lichine (1910–1972), Russian-American ballet dancer and choreographer
- Yakov Henkin (1903–1941), notable Russian street photographer, active in Leningrad in the 1930s

==== 1911–1920 ====
- Emmanuil Evzerikhin (1911–1984), Russian photographer
- Vitali Gubarev (1912–1981), Soviet Russian writer of children's literature
- Ray Lev (1912–1968), American classical pianist
- Nikolai Timkov (1912–1993), Soviet Russian painter
- Igor Bondarevsky (1913–1979), Soviet Russian chess Grandmaster
- Georgy Flyorov (1913–1990), Soviet nuclear physicist
- Gayane Chebotaryan (1918–1998), Soviet Armenian composer and musicologist
- Boris Lavrenko (1920–2001), Russian Soviet realist painter
- Ghazaros Saryan (1920–1998), Armenian composer and educator

==== 1921–1930 ====
- Isabella Bashmakova (1921–2005), Russian historian of mathematics
- Mark Stolberg (1922–1942), Russian chess master
- Daniil Khrabrovitsky (1923–1980), Soviet scriptwriter and film director
- Victor Glushkov (1923–1982), the founding father of information technology in the Soviet Union
- Leonid Shamkovich (1923–2005), Russian chess Grandmaster and chess writer
- Gevork Vartanian (1924–2012), Soviet intelligence agent
- Zinaida Sharko (1929-2016), Soviet and Russian actress of theatre and film
- Mikhail Simonov (1929–2011), Russian aircraft designer famed for creating the Sukhoi Su-27 fighter-bomber
- Ashot Melkonian (1930–2009), Armenian artist

==== 1931–1940 ====
- Yuri Oganessian (born 1933), Russian nuclear physicist of Armenian descent, namesake of oganesson (element 118)
- Mikhail Semyonov (1933–2006), Russian basketball player
- Lev Anninsky (1934–2019), Soviet, Russian literary critic and historian, publicist, essayist, author of more than 30 books
- Anatoly Kononenko (1935–2010), Soviet sprint canoer
- Sergei Vronsky (1935–2003), Soviet and Russian cinematographer
- Izabella Arazova (born 1936), Armenian composer
- Seiran Khatlamadjian (1937–1994), Armenian painter, graphic artist and public figure
- Gennadi Matveyev (1937–2014), Soviet football player
- Viktor Ponedelnik (1937–2020), Soviet football player, regarded as one of the best strikers in Soviet football history
- Lev Sandakchiev (1937–2006), Soviet and Russian scientist, specialist in molecular biology and virology
- Viktor Zubkov (1937–2016), Soviet basketball player
- Enver Yulgushov (1938–2022), Russian professional football coach and former player

==== 1941–1950 ====
- Stefan Samko (born 1941), Russian mathematician
- Nikolay Yakovenko (1941–2006), Russian wrestler
- Viktor Kravchenko (born 1941), Russian triple jumper
- Vladimir Shumeyko (born 1945), Russian political figure
- Alexander Kaidanovsky (1946–1995), Soviet and Russian actor and film director
- Nikolai Korolkov (1946–2024), Soviet equestrian and Olympic champion
- Viktor Asmaev (1947–2002), equestrian and Olympic champion from Russia
- Lyudmila Karachkina (born 1948), Soviet and Ukrainian astronomer
- Georgy Khazagerov (born 1949), Russian scholar
- Aleksandr Ivanov-Sukharevsky (born 1950), far right politician

==== 1951–1960 ====
- Irina Allegrova (born 1952), Russian-Armenian singer
- Yevgeniya Glushenko (born 1952), Russian actress
- Nikolai Sorokin (1952–2013), Russian theatre and film actor
- Yuri Bashmet (born 1953), Russian conductor, violinist and violist
- Pavel Gusev (born 1953), Russian professional football coach and a former player
- Evgeni Barbakov (born 1954), Russian rower
- Vladimir Repyev (1956–2009), Soviet and Russian handball player
- Viktor Kolyadko (born 1957), Russian professional football coach and a former player
- Svetlana Grozdova (born 1959), Soviet Russian gymnast
- Lyubov Orekhova (born 1959), Soviet sprint canoer
- Sviatoslav Nikitenko (born 1960), Ukrainian glyptic artist

==== 1961–1970 ====
- Konstantin Lavronenko (born 1961), Russian actor
- Miroslav Nemirov (1961–2016), Russian poet, associated with Russian punk rock
- Natalia Shaposhnikova (born 1961), Soviet gymnast, two-time Olympic Champion
- Avdey Ter-Oganyan (born 1961), Russian-Armenian painter
- Lyubov Zakharchenko (1961–2008), Russian poet and singer-songwriter
- Stanislav Rudenko (born 1962), Russian football coach and a former player
- Aleksandr Vorobyov (born 1962), Soviet and Russian football player and current coach
- Natalya Artyomova (born 1963), Russian middle-distance runner
- Rafael Samurgashev (born 1963), Soviet Armenian former World champion and European champion Greco-Roman wrestler
- Sergey Zhigunov (born 1963), Soviet and Russian actor and producer
- Igor Vishnevetsky (born 1964), Russian poet and novelist
- Gennadiy Prigoda (born 1965), Russian freestyle swimmer
- Natalya Morskova (born 1966), Russian former handball player
- Andrei Timoshenko (1969–2010), Russian professional footballer
- Larisa Kiselyova (born 1970), Russian handball player
- Oleh Matvyeyev (born 1970), Soviet and Ukrainian football player
- Vladimir Pyshnenko (born 1970), Russian freestyle swimmer

==== 1971–1975 ====
- Yuri Borovskoy (born 1971), Russian professional football referee and a former player
- Andrei Fedkov (born 1971), Russian football player
- Svetlana Goncharenko (born 1971), Russian athlete
- Svetlana Boyko (born 1972), Russian foil fencer
- Sergey Markedonov (born 1972), Director of the Department for Problems of Ethnic Relations at the Institute for Political and Military Analysis in Moscow
- Andrei Redkin (born 1972), Russian football player
- Konstantin Tsuranov (born 1972), Russian sport shooter
- Oleg Vernigorov (born 1972), Russian football player
- Anatoly Morozov (born 1973), Russian professional football player and a coach
- Yekaterina Yusheva (born 1973), Russian fencer
- Vitaly Fokeev (born 1974), Russian sport shooter
- Aleksandr Kostoglod (born 1974), Russian sprint canoeist
- Ekaterina Kovalevskaya (born 1974), Russian chess player
- Serge Polyanichko (born 1974), Russian conductor, horn player and TV presenter
- Nikolay Spinyov (born 1974), Russian rower
- Vitali Tasenko (1975–2025), Russian football player

==== 1976–1980 ====
- Eduard Gritsun (born 1976), Russian professional road bicycle racer
- Angelina Nikonova (born 1976), Russian filmmaker, script writer and film producer
- Oksana Romenskaya (born 1976), Russian team handball player
- Maxim Staviski (born 1977), Russian-born naturalized Bulgarian ice dancer
- Yelena Dudnik (born 1978), Russian sport shooter
- Nina Kaptsova (born 1978), Russian prima ballerina of the Bolshoi Ballet
- Sergei Davydov (born 1979), Russian and Belarusian figure skater
- Aleksandr Galkin (born 1979), Russian chess grandmaster
- Andrey Moiseyev (born 1979), Russian pentathlete
- Varteres Samurgashev (born 1979), Armenian-Russian Greco-Roman wrestler
- Basta (born 1980), Russian rapper and RJ
- Ivan Dyagolchenko (born 1980), Russian professional footballer
- Sergey Fedorovtsev (born 1980), Russian rower
- Yulia Mayboroda (born 1980), Russian theater and film actress
- Yelena Produnova (born 1980), Russian competitive gymnast
- Tony Vilgotsky (born 1980), Russian (ethnically German) musician, composer, horror/fantasy writer and musical columnist

==== 1981–1985 ====
- Anton Rogochiy (born 1982), Russian professional footballer
- Andrei Vorobyov (born 1982), Russian professional footballer
- Alexei Eremenko (born 1983), Russian-born Finnish professional footballer
- Pyotr Gitselov (born 1983), Russian-Swedish footballer
- Victoria Lopyreva (born 1983), Russian actress, model, TV Host, blogger and beauty pageant titleholder who won Miss Russia 2003
- Alexey Makovetskiy (born 1983), Russian rugby union footballer
- Yelena Rigert (born 1983), Russian female hammer thrower
- Igor Salov (born 1983), Russian rower
- Anastasia Sinitsyna (born 1983), Russian female handballer
- Victor Keyru (born 1984), Russian professional basketball player
- Oksana Pochepa (born 1984), Russian pop singer and model
- Marina Belikova (born 1985), Russian sport shooter
- Tatiana Kotova (born 1985), Russian singer, actress, television personality, winner of the title "Miss Russia 2006"
- Pavel Sviridenko (born 1985), Russian professional football player

==== 1986–1990 ====
- Ivan Drannikov (born 1986), Russian professional footballer
- Valery Likhodey (born 1986), Russian professional basketball player
- Sergey Litvinov (born 1986), German and Russian hammer thrower
- Vladislav Ryazantsev (born 1986), Russian left-wing politician
- Aleksandr Abroskin (born 1987), Russian football striker
- Yekaterina Galitskaya (born 1987), Russian hurdler
- Antonina Krivoshapka (born 1987), Russian sprinter
- Andrei Mikheyev (born 1987), Russian professional football player
- Eva Rivas (born 1987), Russian-Armenian singer
- Yekaterina Tudegesheva (born 1987), Russian professional snowboarder
- Katerina Keyru (born 1988), Russian basketball shooting guard
- Maria Kryuchkova (1988–2015), Russian gymnast
- Vladimir Khozin (born 1989), Russian professional footballer
- Andrei Lyakh (born 1990), Russian professional football player
- Ivan Popov (born 1990), Russian chess grandmaster

==== 1991–1995 ====
- Aleksandr Tumasyan (born 1992), Armenian football player
- Aleksey Denisenko (born 1993), Russian taekwondo practitioner
- Vlada Chigireva (born 1994), Russian competitor in synchronized swimming
- Anton Lazutkin (born 1994), Russian football player
- Igor Leontyev (born 1994), Russian football player
- Yulia Belokobylskaya (born 1995), Russian artistic gymnast
- Ivan Bukavshin (1995–2016), Russian chess Grandmaster
- Kasta (formed in 1995), Russian rap group
- Mikhail Puntov (born 1995), Russian singer

==== 1996–2000 ====
- Mikhail Samarsky (born 1996), Russian writer, blogger and public figure
- Konstantin Tolokonnikov (born 1996), Russian middle distance runner
- Leo Goglichidze (born 1997), Russian football player of Georgian origin
- Nikita Nagornyy (born 1997), Russian artistic gymnast
- Maria Kharenkova (born 1998), Russian artistic gymnast
- Georgi Makhatadze (born 1998), Russian football player
- Vladimir Atoev (born 1999), Russian racing driver

=== 21st century ===
==== 2001–2010 ====
- Alisa Fedichkina (born 2002), Russian competitive figure skater
- Motorama (formed in 2005), Russian post-punk band
- Vsevolod Ishchenko (born 2002), professional Russian basketball player for the Dallas Mavericks

== Lived in Rostov-on-Don ==
- Georgy Sedov (1877–1914), Russian Arctic explorer
- Evgeny Schwartz (1896–1958), Soviet writer and playwright
- Alexander Pechersky (1909–1990), one of the organizers, and the leader, of the most successful uprising and mass-escape of Jews from a Nazi extermination camp during World War II
- Aleksandr Solzhenitsyn (1918–2008), Russian novelist, historian and short story writer
- Svyatoslav Fyodorov (1927–2000), Russian ophthalmologist, politician, professor
- Natalia Duritskaya (born 1960), Russian painter

== See also ==
- List of Russian people
- List of Russian-language poets
