= Henkin =

Henkin is a Jewish last name and may refer to the following people:

- Leon Henkin, logician and mathematician
  - Henkin quantifier, a concept he pioneered
- Gennadi Henkin, mathematician
- William A. Henkin, psychotherapist and sex therapist
- Yosef Eliyahu Henkin, Orthodox rabbi
- Louis Henkin, legal academician and writer
- Yehudah Herzl Henkin, Orthodox rabbi, nephew of Louis Henkin and grandson of Yosef Eliyahu Henkin
- Eitam and Na'ama Henkin, American-Israeli couple killed in a terror attack in 2015
- Hilary Henkin, American screenwriter and producer
- Evgeny and Yakov Henkin, 1930s street photographers in Berlin and Leningrad (St. Petersburg)
- Vladimir Ya. Henkin, Russian and Soviet stage and screen actor and comic, People's Artist of the RSFSR
- Victor Henkin, singer and dramatic actor
- Kirill V. Henkin, Soviet and dissident public figure, secret agent, writer, journalist and long-term contributor to Radio Liberty
- Lauren Henkin, visual artist and landscape photographer
