= Ḥakirah (journal) =

Ḥakirah, The Flatbush Journal of Jewish Law and Thought
- Discipline: Jewish law and thought
- Language: English and Hebrew

Publication details
- Frequency: Semi-annually
- Open access: After 6 months

Standard abbreviations
- ISO 4: Ḥakirah

Indexing
- ISSN: 1532-1290

Links
- Journal homepage

Ḥakirah, The Flatbush Journal of Jewish Law and Thought is a periodical journal in the field of halakha and Jewish thought. The journal is owned by Hakirah Inc. and operates from editorial offices in Brooklyn, producing two issues annually.

== Foundation and early years ==
Hakirah is a Jewish journal which publishes articles that reflect a wide range of Orthodox beliefs and ideas. Those who submit articles run the gamut from laypeople, to rabbis, doctors and professors. The first volume of Hakirah was published in the fall of 2004. Each volume generally contains about ten English and two Hebrew articles comprising a total of about 250 pages. A new volume appears about every six to seven months.

Hakirah was created by a small group of individuals in Flatbush, Brooklyn concerned about an alleged lack of sophistication in Torah study and what they believed was an excessive reliance on mysticism and kabbalah, and the early volumes of Hakirah relied mainly on articles by members of the original group, Asher Benzion Buchman, David Guttmann, Sheldon Epstein, Yonah Wilamowsky and Heshey Zelcer. From about the third volume, however, Hakirah began to attract international attention whereupon Hakirah redefined its mission to include not just the Flatbush community but those who identified with the Flatbush Orthodox community.

== Mission statement ==
The mission of Hakirah is to encourage members of the Flatbush community to study issues of Jewish law and thought in depth by analyzing original sources, and to provide these same individuals with a forum to disseminate the results of their study.

Although not stated explicitly on either their Web page or journal, the orientation of the Hakirah board is toward a commitment to Orthodox Judaism that is accepting of the proven natural science and documented history, and cognizant of the general culture and zeitgeist.

Hakirah tries to address what its editors consider important contemporary issues affecting the Orthodox Community as they arise. In this vein, Hakirah has solicited and published articles on "The Eruv", Mezizah B'Peh", the "Slifkin Affair" and the current "Conversion Controversy" in what its editors believe is a straightforward and detailed manner.

Hakirah is not affiliated with any political or rabbinic institution. Its articles question accepted institutions of both the right as well as works and ideas of the Modern Orthodox Judaism and the left.

== Editor and Review Board ==
The staff of Hakirah are mainly volunteers and the core members are those on the Editorial Board: Asher Benzion Buchman, Sheldon Epstein, David Guttmann, the late Shlomo Sprecher, and Heshey Zelcer. Two of the board members have semikhah but none are rabbis by profession. R. Asher Benzion Buchman is the Editor-in-Chief.

== Policies ==
Upon the release of each new volume Hakirah posts the first two pages of each article on its web page except for the lead article which it publishes in full. When the following volume is published the full text of all the articles in the previous volume are made available on its web page.

Transliteration of Hebrew words into English should follow the conventions of either Encyclopedia Judaica or ArtScroll.

== Important articles ==
Hakirah contains articles from rabbis, doctors, scholars and lay-people throughout the world. Some of the articles which created a sensation upon publication are:

- "Mezizah be-Peh – Therapeutic Touch or Hippocratic Vestige?" by Shlomo Sprecher argues against the need to perform Mezizah with the mouth and shows that Hatam Sofer was of the same opinion.
- "Is Handshaking a Torah Violation?" by Yehuda Henkin argues that for a man to shake a woman's hand in a business setting is not a Biblical prohibition (see Negiah). See also letters and follow-up in the following volume.
- A pair of articles by Aharon Hersh Fried "Are our Children too Worldly?" and "Is there a Disconnect between Torah Learning and Torah Living" examines the failures of a yeshiva education.
- "A Hagiographer's Review of 'Studies in Maimonides and His Interpreters'" by Asher Benzion Buchman challenges the claim of an academic that Rambam was careless and made many errors.
- Three articles in volume 7 by Yehuda Henkin, Marc D. Angel and Eliezer ben Porat question the decision by a Beit Din in Israel that invalidated retroactively the conversion of thousands of converts to Judaism.
- An article in volume 9 by Joe Bobker, To Flee Or To Stay is an article about the advice and decisions made by community leaders and rabbis on whether or not to flee the Nazi onslaught.
