= Sviridenko =

Sviridenko, Svyrydenko (Ukrainian: Свириденко), or Svirydzienka (Belarusian: Свірыдзенка) is a surname. Notable people with the surname include:

- Dmitry Sviridenko (born 1997), Belarusian footballer
- Pavel Sviridenko (born 1985), Russian footballer
- Georgi Sviridenko (born 1962), Soviet-Belarusian handball player
- Yulia Svyrydenko (born 1985), Ukrainian politician
