= Nikitenko =

Nikitenko (Ukrainian: Нікітенко; Russian: Никитенко) is a Ukrainian surname. Notable people with the surname include:

- Alexander Nikitenko (1804–1877), Russian journalist
- Andrei Nikitenko (born 1979), Russian ice hockey player
- Lyubov Nikitenko (born 1948), Kazakhstani hurdler
- Sviatoslav Nikitenko (born 1960), Ukrainian glyptic artist
- Viktor Nikitenko (born 1947), Russian football coach
- Yuriy Nikitenko (born 1974), Ukrainian footballer
