= Igor Simonenko =

Igor Borisovich Simonenko
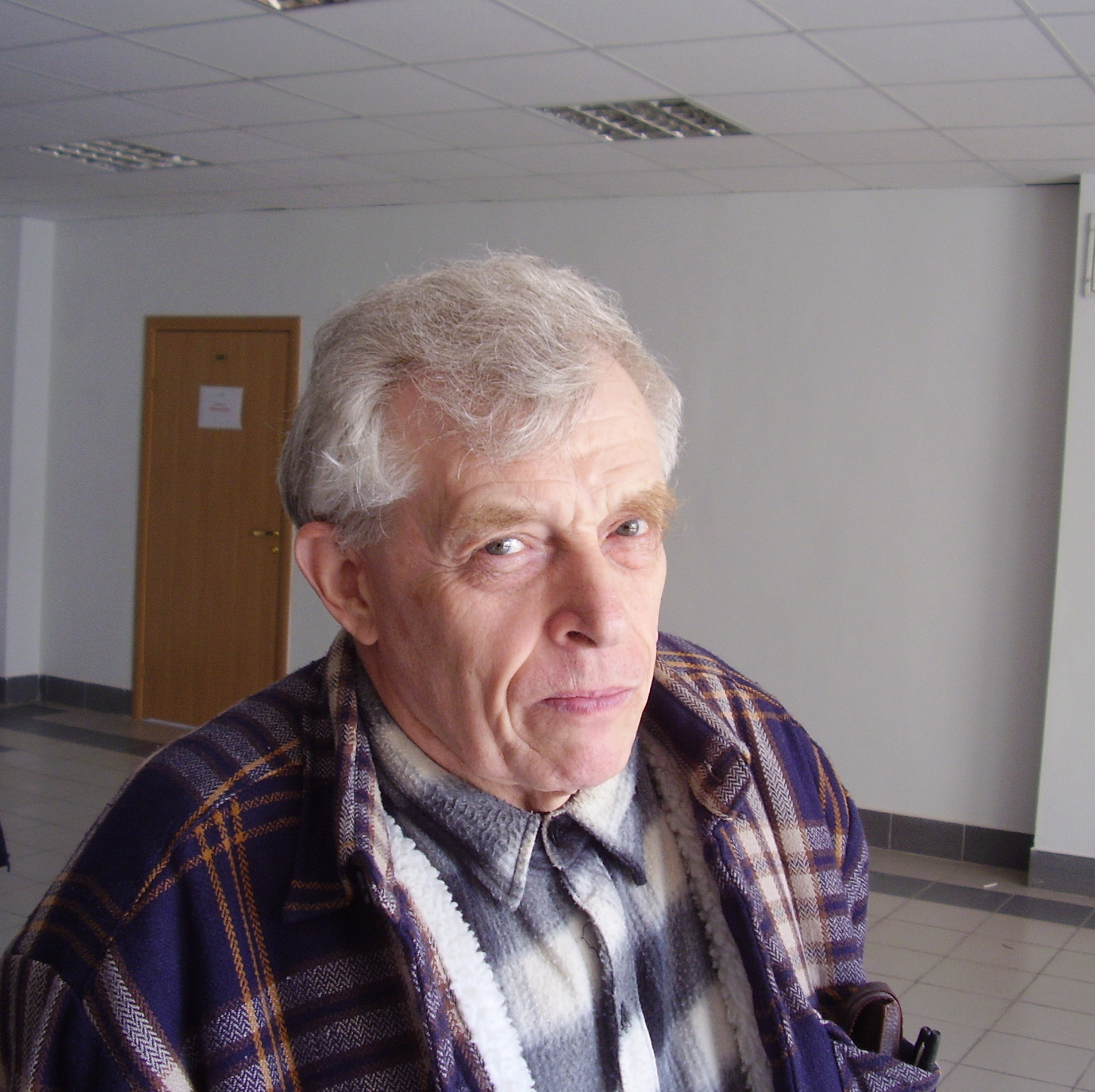
- Born: Игорь Борисович Симоненко; Igor Borisovich Simonenko; 16 August 1935; Kiev
- Died: 22 March 2008 (aged 72); Rostov-on-Don
- Occupation: mathematician

Igor Borisovich Simonenko (Russian: Игорь Борисович Симоненко; 16 August 1935, Kiev — 22 March 2008, Rostov-on-Don) was a Russian mathematician. Professor, Doctor of Physical and Mathematical Sciences, Honoured Scientist of the Russian Federation.

== Biography ==
Igor Borisovich Simonenko was born on 16 August 1935 in Kiev. In 1947 he entered Luhansk Machine-Building Technical School and later worked at factory. Since 1953 he studied at the Faculty of Mechanics of Rostov State University and in 1959 graduated it with honours. The results of his diploma work were published in the reports of the USSR Academy of Sciences.

Then he continued to study in graduate school, his scientific supervisor was Professor Fyodor Gakhov. In 1961 he defended his candidate thesis. Six years later, at the age of 32, he wrote his doctoral dissertation.

Professor since 1970. In 1972 he was appointed head of the newly created Department of Algebra and Discrete Mathematics of Rostov State University.

Simonenko wrote two monographs on the application of the local principle. During his research he made discoveries in the field of one-dimensional and multidimensional singular integral equations. The results were published in the academic press and were later translated into English by The American Mathematical Society.

Igor Simonenko supervised the defense of 22 candidate and 4 doctoral dissertations.

He died on 22 March 2008 in Rostov-on-Don.
