= Redkin =

Redkin (Russian: Редькин) is a Russian masculine surname, its feminine counterpart is Redkina. Notable people with the surname include:

- Andrei Redkin (born 1972), Russian footballer
- Evgeny Redkin (born 1970), Russian biathlete
- Mark Redkin (1908–1987), Soviet photographer
- Mykola Redkin (born 1928), Ukrainian hammer thrower
