= Gakhov =

Gakhov is a Slavic surname. Notable people with the surname include:

- Ivan Gakhov (born 1996), Russian tennis player
- Fyodor Gakhov (1906–1980), Soviet and Russian mathematician
