= Oleg Vernigorov =

Russian footballer

Personal information
- Full name: Oleg Petrovich Vernigorov
- Date of birth: 5 May 1972 (age 54)
- Height: 1.70 m (5 ft 7 in)
- Position: Midfielder

Youth career
- RO UOR Rostov-on-Don

Senior career*
Years	Team	Apps	(Gls)
1989–1990	FC Rostselmash Rostov-on-Don	9	(0)
1990–1992	FC SKA Rostov-on-Don	77	(2)
1992–1993	FC Rostselmash Rostov-on-Don	9	(0)
1992–1993	→ FC Rostselmash-2 Rostov-on-Don (loan)	32	(4)
1994	FC Obninsk	14	(4)
1994–1995	FC SKA Rostov-on-Don	43	(4)
1996–1999	FC Torpedo Arzamas	124	(5)
2000–2001	FC Tyumen	28	(1)
2002	FC Mayak Rostov-on-Don		
2003	FC Progress Kamensk-Shakhtinsky (amateur)		
2003	FC Bataysk (amateur)		
2004	FC Alternativa Rostov-on-Don		
2006	FC Dos-Nauka Oporny		
- * Club domestic league appearances and goals

Oleg Petrovich Vernigorov (Russian: Олег Петрович Вернигоров; born 5 May 1972 in Rostov-on-Don) is a former Russian football player.
