= Yekaterina Galitskaya =

Russian hurdler (born 1987)

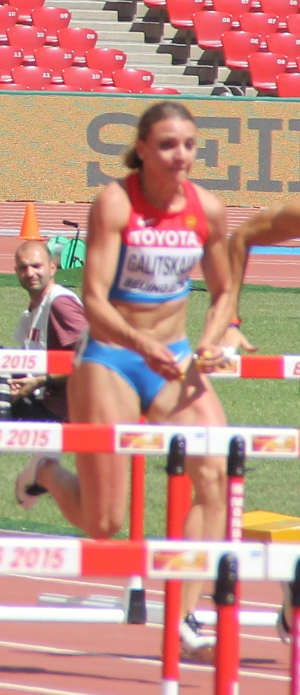
Yekaterina Galitskaya in 2015

Yekaterina Viktorovna Galitskaya (Cyrillic: Екатерина Викторовна Галицкая; born 24 February 1987 in Rostov-on-Don) is a Russian hurdler. At the 2012 Summer Olympics, she competed in the Women's 100 metres hurdles, reaching the semifinals. In February 2019, the Court of Arbitration for Sport handed her a four-year ban for doping, starting from 1 February 2019 with all her results from 15 July 2012 to 31 December 2014 disqualified. On appeal, her ban was reduced from four years to three years.

== Competition record ==
Year	Competition	Venue	Position	Event	Notes
Representing Russia
2012	World Indoor Championships	Istanbul, Turkey	15th (sf)	60 m hurdles	8.26
2012	Olympic Games	London, United Kingdom	DSQ	100 m hurdles	~~12.90~~
2014	World Indoor Championships	Sopot, Poland	DSQ	60 m hurdles	~~8.20~~
2014	European Championships	Zürich, Switzerland	DSQ	100 m hurdles	~~13.24~~
2015	World Championships	Beijing, China	— (sf)	100 m hurdles	DNF
2015	Military World Games	Mungyeong, South Korea	1st	100 m	13.06

== See also ==
- List of doping cases in athletics
- Doping at the Olympic Games
- List of people from Rostov-on-Don
