= Track and field at the 2015 Military World Games – Women's 100 metres hurdles =

The women's 100 metres hurdles event at the 2015 Military World Games was held on 6 and 7 October at the KAFAC Sports Complex.

== Records ==
Prior to this competition, the existing world and CISM record were as follows:

World Record	Yordanka Donkova (BUL)	12.21	Stara Zagora, Bulgaria	20 August 1988
CISM World Record	Alina Talay (BLR)	12.95	Rio de Janeiro, Brazil	22 July 2011

== Schedule ==
Date	Time	Round
6 October 2015	14:15	Round 1
7 October 2015	16:25	Final

== Medalists ==
Gold	Silver	Bronze
Ekaterina Galitskaia; Russia	Ekaterina Poplavskaya; Belarus	Nina Morozova; Russia

== Results ==
=== Round 1 ===
Qualification: First 3 in each heat (Q) and next 2 fastest (q) qualified for the final.

Wind:
Heat 1: -1.3 m/s, Heat 2: -1.1 m/s

Rank	Heat	Name	Nationality	Time	Notes
1	2	Ekaterina Galitskaia	Russia	13.22	Q
2	2	Ekaterina Poplavskaya	Belarus	13.30	Q
3	1	Nina Morozova	Russia	13.31	Q
4	2	Hanna Platitsyna	Ukraine	13.57	Q
5	2	Fabiana Moraes	Brazil	13.60	q
6	1	Anna Kiełbasińska	Poland	13.67	Q
7	1	Linda Züblin	Switzerland	13.87	Q
8	2	Yarong Zheng	China	14.04	q
9	2	Priscilla Tabunda	Kenya	14.29	
	1	Hanna Ryzhykova	Ukraine	DNF	
	1	Alina Talay	Belarus	DQ	R162.7

=== Final ===
Wind: -0.6 m/s

Rank	Lane	Name	Nationality	Time	Notes
1st place, gold medalist(s)	3	Ekaterina Galitskaia	Russia	13.06	
2nd place, silver medalist(s)	4	Ekaterina Poplavskaya	Belarus	13.29	
3rd place, bronze medalist(s)	5	Nina Morozova	Russia	13.38	
4	7	Hanna Platitsyna	Ukraine	13.41	
5	1	Fabiana Moraes	Brazil	13.68	
6	8	Linda Züblin	Switzerland	13.71	
7	2	Yarong Zheng	China	13.96	
	6	Anna Kiełbasińska	Poland	DQ	R168.7b
