= Mikhail Samarsky =

Russian writer, blogger and public figure

Mikhail Samarsky Михаил Самарский
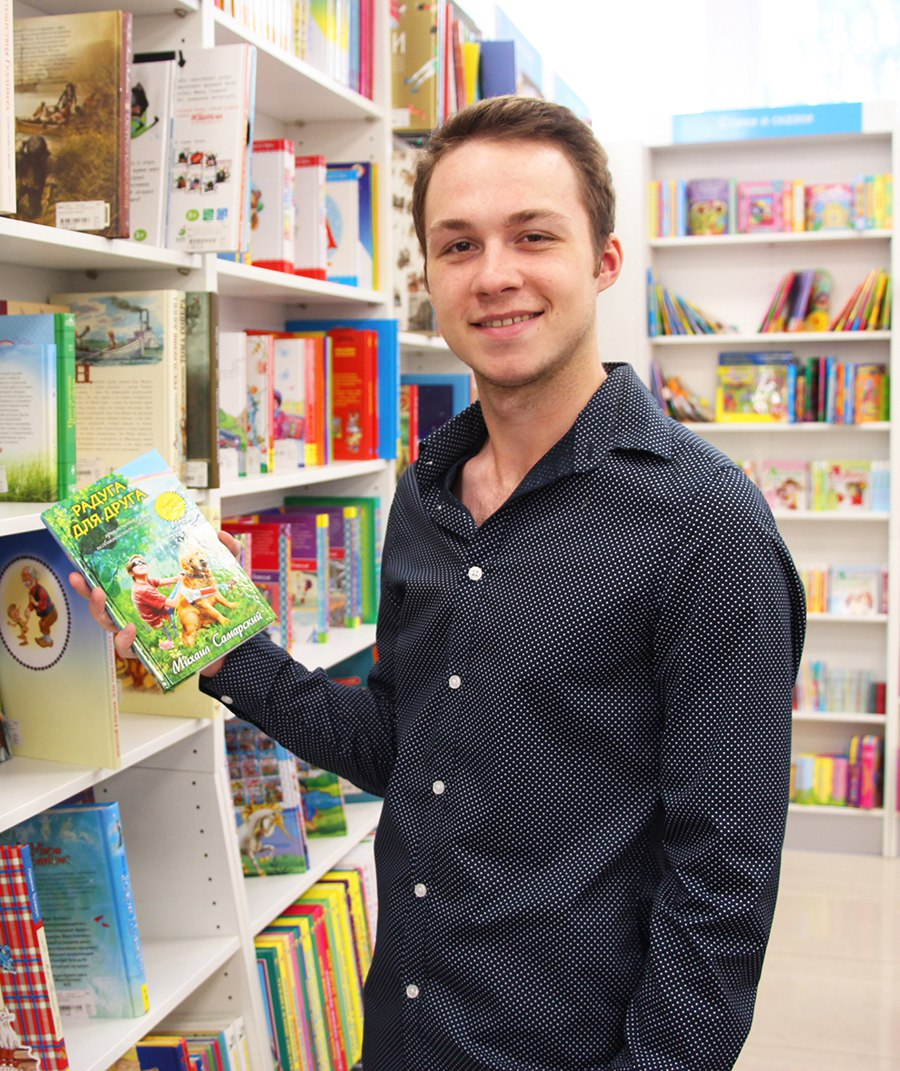
- Mikhail Samarsky in 2017
- Born: Mikhail Aleksandrovich Samarsky; 15 August 1996 (age 29); Rostov-on-Don, Russia
- Occupations: Writer, blogger, public figure
- Parent(s): Anna and Aleksandr Samarsky
- Website: mishasamarsky.ru

Mikhail Aleksandrovich Samarsky (Russian: Михаил Александрович Самарский, born 15 August 1996, Rostov-on-Don) is a Russian writer, blogger and public figure. He is an honorary member of the Union of Russian-speaking writers of Bulgaria and president of the charitable foundation "Living Hearts" («Живые сердца»)

== Biography ==
Samarsky was born on 15 August 1996 in Rostov-on-Don and has lived in Moscow since 1997. He studied at Moscow's School No. 1084 from 2003 to 2007 and at School No. 1239 from 2007 to 2012. From 2012 to 2013, he studied at the School of External Studies No. 1, which is affiliated with Moscow State University. In 2013, he was admitted to the Department of Political Science of Moscow State University.

At the same time, he graduated from the Faculty of Military Education of Moscow State University and was sent to the recruitment office and enlistment office of Moscow for military training in the 4th Guards Kantemirovskaya Tank Division.

In 2017, after graduating from Moscow State University he entered Gerasimov Institute of Cinematography at the Higher Courses of Cinema and Television according to the program “Cinema Direction and Screen Writing”.

Since 23 August 2018, Mikhail works as an actor at “Theater Orbit” studio; he debuted at the Tyumen Drama Theater.

== Family ==
Samarsky's father, Alexander Vasilyevich Samarsky (born 1959), is a playwright, script writer and poet. His mother, Anna Mikhailovna Samarskaya (maiden name Amelina) (born 1971), author of detective novels published under the pseudonym Anna Arkan, chairman of the board of the charity fund to help blind people «Living hearts»

== Literary activity ==
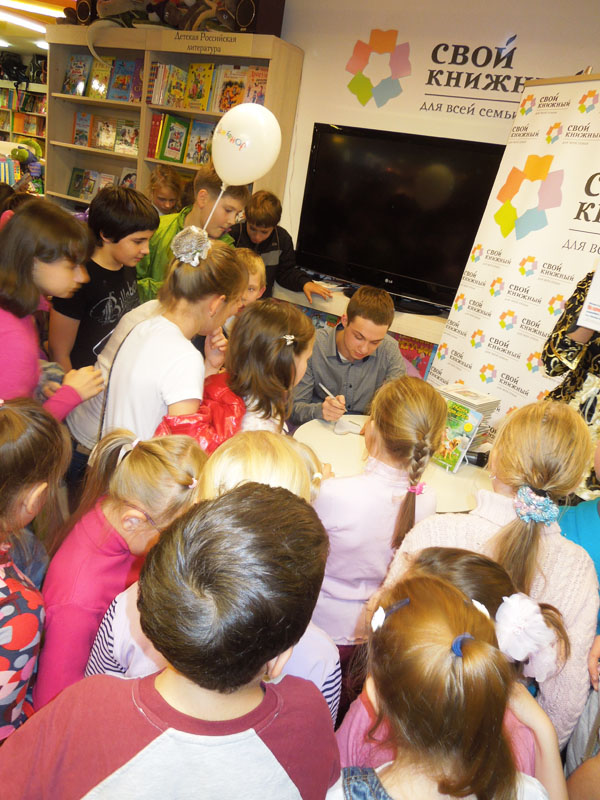
Meeting with readers at the Odintzovo bookstore, Moscow.

Samarsky, at the age of twelve, wrote his first novella, "On a Teeterboard Between the Hills,” which, upon its publication the following year, received coverage by the mass media. Yekaterina Bosina, writing in "Ogonyok" magazine, wrote that there are no "substantial revelations" for adult readers, but "from the language perspective the book isn't "Baby talk" at all, the absence of which "gives Misha Samarsky an edge over the majority of his peers." Samarsky, thus encouraged, continued his literary activity. He published a novel, "A Rainbow for a Friend,” which became the first in a four-book series. (Moreover, the "Eksmo" publishing house has published the books under the theme, "The Adventures of an Extraordinary Dog.") An article published in the magazine Neva in the summer of 2013 referred to Samarsky as "a young prose writer well known by the greater [Russian] public.

== Public activity and charitable work ==
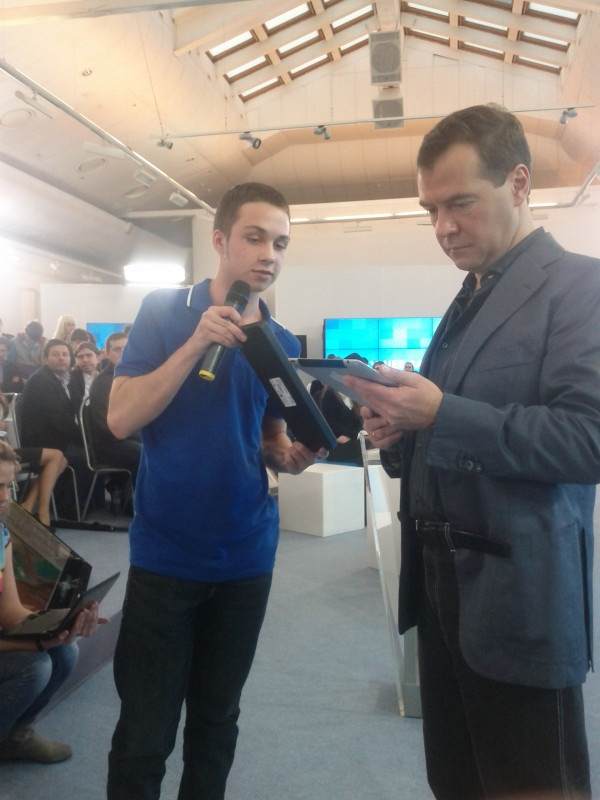
Mikhail Samarsky and D. A. Medved'yev during a meeting with Russian bloggers.

Samarsky began his engagement in charitable activities in 2010, when he founded an informal program, "Living Hearts,” through which, with the help of friends and acquaintances, he was able to assist blind children. He published audio books, Braille-font books, etc., and purchased equipment for blind and visually impaired children. Russian entrepreneurs, politicians and actors provided assistance in the operation of the program. Businessman Andrei Ryabinsky proposed that it be registered as an official charity fund for the blind under the "Living Hearts" name. Thus, on October 12, 2012 the charity fund "Living Hearts" was founded on the basis of the program. Anna Mikhailovna Samarskaya, Mikhail's mother, is a co-founder and the chairperson of the fund.

On 9 November 2011, during the meeting with Russia's President Dmitry Medvedev and Russian bloggers, Samarsky raised the issue of Internet accessibility for visually impaired people. He stated that the Braille displays for computers are out of reach for the majority of visually impaired people because they're expensive and the displays, which are provided to children for use in their studies, must be returned after graduation. The issue received further development, and President Medved'yev recommended an amendment to the legislation to allow a child to keep the technical equipment after graduation.

== Bibliography ==
Editions in Russian language

1. Mikhail Samarsky (2018). On a Teetering Board Between the Hills (На качелях между холмами) (3000 ed.). Moscow.: AST. p. 256. ISBN 978-5-17-105163-1.
2. Mikhail Samarsky (2012). On a Teetering Board Between the Hills (На качелях между холмами) (8000 ed.). Moscow.: Eksmo. p. 224. ISBN 978-5-699-59476-4.
3. Mikhail Samarsky (2012). A Rainbow for a Friend (Радуга для друга) (50 000 ed.). Moscow.: Eksmo. p. 256. ISBN 978-5-699-55056-2.
4. Mikhail Samarsky (2012). The Formula for Kindness (Формула добра) (26 000 ed.). Moscow.: Eksmo. p. 224. ISBN 978-5-699-57003-4.
5. Mikhail Samarsky. Fukushima of the History of Dog's Friendship (Фукусима, или История собачьей дружбы) (23 000 ed.). Moscow.: Eksmo. p. 224. ISBN 978-5-699-64032-4.
6. Mikhail Samarsky (2018). Twelve Touches to the Horizon (Двенадцать прикосновений к горизонту) (5000 ed.). Moscow: AST. p. 256. ISBN 978-5-17-105162-4.
7. Mikhail Samarsky (2013). "The Day of Hope" collected works (Сборник "День надежды") (14 000 ed.). Moscow.: Eksmo. p. 416. ISBN 978-5-699-67028-4.
8. Mikhail Samarsky (2014). "Island of Luck" ("Остров везения") (17 000 ed.). Moscow.: Eksmo. p. 224. ISBN 978-5-699-69877-6.
9. Mikhail Samarsky (2015). "#Love or a True Story" (#Любовь, или невыдуманная история) (13 000 ed.). Moscow: Eksmo. p. 224. ISBN 978-5-699-76168-5.
10. Mikhail Samarsky (2015). "How Trison Became a Cop, or the Rules of Good Affairs." (Как Трисон стал полицейским, или правила добрых дел.) (10 000 ed.). Moscow: Eksmo. p. 224. ISBN 978-5-699-80003-2.
11. Mikhail Samarsky (2015). "Collection "Time to Give Love"" (Сборник "Время дарить любовь") (6 000 ed.). Moscow.: Eksmo. p. 420. ISBN 978-5-699-84246-9.
12. Mikhail Samarsky (2016). "#Love, or Where The Clouds Float" (#Любовь, или куда уплывают облака) (7 000 ed.). Moscow.: Eksmo. p. 224. ISBN 978-5-699-73560-0.
13. Mikhail Samarsky (2015). "CALL of Memory" (ЗОВ памяти). Moscow.: Eksmo. p. 180. ISBN 978-5-699-85795-1.
14. Mikhail Samarsky (2018). "Uninvited Guest" (Гость непрошеный). Canada.: Altaspera Publishing & Literary Agency Inc. (Canada). p. 288. ISBN 9781387667703.
15. Mikhail Samarsky (2018). "Girl by name Want" (Девочка по имени Хочу). Canada: Altaspera Publishing & Literary Agency Inc. (Canada). p. 324. ISBN 9781387760053.
16. Mikhail Samarsky (2018). "Incredible Adventures of the Cat by Name Socrates" (Невероятные приключения Кота Сократа) (5000 ed.). Moscow: AST. p. 352. ISBN 978-5-17-109402-7.
17. Mikhail Samarsky (2018). "Last Photo" (Последняя фотография) (5000 ed.). Moscow: AST. p. 390. ISBN 978-5-17-110309-5.

EBooks

1. Mikhail Samarsky (2018). Novel With Happy End (18+).
2. Mikhail Samarsky (2018). Native Blood Virus (Betrayal Formula) (18+).
3. Mikhail Samarsky (2018). Last Photo (18+).
4. Mikhail Samarsky (2018). CALL of Memory (12+).
5. Mikhail Samarsky (2018). Stories (12+).
6. Mikhail Samarsky (2018). Incredible Adventures of the Cat by Name Socrates (12+).
7. Mikhail Samarsky (2018). People Crucified by Love (18+).
8. Mikhail Samarsky (2018). Girl by name Want" (18+).

Editions in other languages

1. Mikhail Samarsky (2013). A Rainbow for a Friend [Радуга для друга]. L&L Publishing. p. 200. ISBN 978-0615840178. (English)
2. Mikhail Samarsky (2013). Chó dẫn đường phiêu lưu ký – tập 1 [Радуга для друга]. First News & NXB Tổng Hợp TPHCM. p. 248. (Vietnamese)
3. Mikhail Samarsky (2013). Chó dẫn đường phiêu lưu ký – tập 2 [Формула добра.] (10 000 ed.). First News & NXB Tổng Hợp TPHCM. p. 256. (Vietnamese)
4. Mikhail Samarsky (2016). Дъга за приятел, Радуга для друга [Формула добра. (Formula of good)] (1000 ed.). Асеневци. p. 220. ISBN 978-954-8898-95-9. (Bulgarian)

Audiobooks

1. Mikhail Samarsky (2011). A Rainbow for a Friend (5000 ed.). M.: L-records.
2. Mikhail Samarsky (2013). On a Teetering Board Between the Hills (3000 ed.). M .: L-records.
3. Mikhail Samarsky (2013). The Formula for Kindness (3000 ed.). M.: L-records.
4. Mikhail Samarsky (2015). CALL of Memory (3000 ed.). M .: L-records.
5. Mikhail Samarsky (2015). Island of Luck (3000 ed.). M .: L-records.

Braille Books

1. Mikhail Samarsky (2011). A Rainbow for a Friend (500 ed.). SPb .: Reading.
2. Mikhail Samarsky (2012). The Formula for Kindness (Return of Trison). (Формула добра (Возвращение Трисона) (750 ed.). SPb .: Reading.

Scientific work

1. Samarsky M. A., Ektov N. S., Shepotinenko M. S. (2015). Formation of the Political Consciousness of Russian Schoolchildren in the Process of Political Socialization. // Youth policy in modern Russia: Questions of theory and practice: Materials of the IV All-Russian Scientific-Practical Conference (1000 ed.). Tver: SFK-office. p. 368.

== Picturizations and plays ==
On 13 October 2012, the premier of the play "I'm a Dog" took place at the "Samarskaya Ploschad'” theater (under director E. B. Drobyshev) based on the novel "A Rainbow for a Friend". Six months later, Mrs. Natalia Nosova, the theater director, acknowledged the project as successful. The "Samarskaya Ploschad'" theater for the play "I'm a Dog" was thus awarded a special prize "For a Socially Important Project" and the Governor's Award, "Theatrical Muse of Samarsk-2012".

In 2012 a documentary film on the lives of blind people, titled "Living Hearts,” was shot with the participation of Mikhail Samarsky.

In August 2018, a theatrical rendition of "Rainbow for a Friend" premiered at the Tyumen Drama Theatre. The role of Labrador Trison was played by Samarsky himself.

In November 2018, there was a premiere of the play “Rainbow for a Friend” at the Bulgakov Theatre in Moscow.

== Awards ==
Samarsky has been awarded the following awards for the play "A Rainbow for a Friend":

- Diploma of the Laureate of Lomonosov, "Talents and Abilities" category, 2009;
- Golden Diploma named after Iosif Alexandrovich Brodsky;
- The grand prize in the multigenre literary contest "Slon,” 2009.
- The special prize of the jury of the Moscow Open Festival of Small Forms Performances for Children “Fairy World” for the text to the play “I Am a Dog” (2013).
- The project of Mikhail Samarsky's “Insight of the Soul - Living Hearts” won second place in the “Equal” nomination at the contest “Our Moscow Region” (2014).
- In 2015, the project of Samarsky, Maria Shepotinenko and Nikolai Ektov, “Formation of the national-state identity of Moscow schoolchildren” became the winner of the All-Russian creative competition of research works, social projects and programs to foster civic identity among students.
