= Henkin brothers =

20th-century amateur photographers

The two Henkin brothers, Evgeny (14 December 1900 – 3 January 1938) and Yakov (2 December 1903 – 13 December 1941), were significant early 20th century amateur street and documentary photographers who primarily recorded the daily life of, respectively, Berlin, Germany and Leningrad (now St. Petersburg), Russia, in the late 1920s and 1930s, during the interwar years. Their photographs, mostly never printed in their lifetimes and kept as negatives, were re-discovered by the descendants of Yakov Henkin in the late 2000s. This collection, known as the Henkin Brothers Archive, consists of around 7000 frames of photography.

The two brothers lived in two major European cities - Evgeny in Berlin and Yakov in Leningrad - during a crucial period in history and shared many themes and compositions in their photography. This aspect of their heritage shows links between the two cities and countries right before the confrontation and destruction of World War II. The Archive is valued as a historical and cultural artifact, an important collection of vernacular photography, as well as an affecting testament to life in Europe in the interwar period.

== Biography ==
Evgeny and Yakov Henkin were born in Rostov-on-Don, in the European South of the Russian Empire, in the family of Alexander Henkin and his wife Anna, née Erberg. Several years after the 1917 October Revolution, Evgeny moved to Germany and lived in Berlin from 1925 to 1936. In 1930, Yakov moved with his wife Frida and their only daughter Galina to Leningrad. The brothers' younger sister Sofia also settled in Leningrad in the 1920s. The brothers were part of the large and creative Henkin family, which included their uncles Vladimir and Victor Henkin, both prominent actors in the 1920s and 30s, and their cousin Kirill Henkin, in post-World War II years a writer and subsequently a journalist with Radio Free Europe/Radio Liberty.

Photography wasn't the profession of either brother. Yakov was an economist, while Evgeny was a musician, playing the theremin, an early electronic instrument. Background | Henkin Brothers Archive

In 1936, Evgeny Henkin returned to the Soviet Union. He was arrested by the Soviet secret police NKVD in late 1937, at the height of Stalinist purges. Accused of being a German spy, he was shot in early January 1938. He is buried at the Levashovo Memorial Cemetery, the site of mass execution and burial of victims of political persecution of the Stalinist era.

In 1941, Yakov enlisted as a volunteer in the weeks after Germany invaded the Soviet Union. He was mortally wounded on the Leningrad Front shortly thereafter. He is buried in a World War II memorial site at the Pundolovskoe cemetery of the Suoranda village on the outskirts of St. Petersburg.

== Exhibitions ==
=== The State Hermitage Museum, July–September 2017 ===
A selection of 142 photographs was shown to the public for the first time in an exhibition in 2017 at the State Hermitage Museum in St. Petersburg, Russia, entitled “The Henkin Brothers: A Discovery. People of 1920s-1930s Berlin and Leningrad". The exhibition was curated by Dr. Dimitri Ozerkov and installed at the General Staff Building as one of a series of events organized by the State Hermitage to celebrate the 100th anniversary of the 1917 revolutions. The exhibition and the photographic heritage of the Henkin brothers received extensive coverage in the media and press, with multiple reviews and assessments.

In July 2017, Bloomberg.com included the State Hermitage exhibition in the Top-10 list of museum exhibitions to see during the summer of 2017 worldwide. Bloomberg wrote: "Rarely has an exhibition made more sense, or seemed more clever, than the juxtaposition of photographs by the brothers Evgeny and Yakov Henkin." The exhibition of photography by Evgeny and Yakov Henkin was named one of 16 principal exhibitions to see in St. Petersburg during the summer of 2017 by Village.ru as well as one of 20 best exhibitions of autumn 2017 by Sobaka.ru. Subsequently, in February 2018, the design of the exhibition by Andrey Shelyutto and Irina Chekmareva received one of the first "St. Petersburg of the Future" design awards.

=== Street Photo Milano, May 2019 ===
On 16–19 May 2019 a selection of photos by Evgeny and Yakov Henkin was shown at the Street Photo Milano Festival, in Milan, Italy, for the first time in Western Europe, in an exhibition entitled Evgeny and Yakov Henkin: dall'Oscurita alla Luce. Un Tesoro Ritrovato.(Evgeny and Yakov Henkin: Into the Light from Darkness. A Rediscovered Treasure.). At the festival, the two brothers were presented as pioneers of the street photography practice and aesthetic.

== Publications ==
=== "Les Frères Henkin. Photographes à Leningrad et à Berlin." ===
A book of photographs by Evgeny and Yakov Henkin, entitled Les Frères Henkin. Photographes à Leningrad et à Berlin. (The Henkin Brothers. Photographers in Leningrad and in Berlin.), was released by Les Editions Noir sur Blanc, a Swiss-French publishing house and a part of the Libella Group, on 24 October 2019. The book includes 180 photos by Evgeny and Yakov Henkin, most published for the first time. The book also has an introduction by Gueorgui Pinkhassov and articles by Daniel Girardin, Lorraine de Meaux, Denis Maslov, and Olga Walther. It is published in French.

== Henkin Brothers Archive Association (HBAA) ==
In late 2016, the not-for-profit “Henkin Brothers Archive Association” (HBAA) was created under Swiss law in Lausanne, Switzerland. The main objective of the HBAA is to bring the Henkin brothers' creative heritage to public and specialist attention and to disseminate information about the two photographers, their lives and times, and the indelible images they left behind. The HBAA seeks to preserve and conserve the negatives contained in the Archive, as well as to organize and to collaborate on exhibitions, publications, research projects, presentations, and other activities. The HBAA owns the Archive and holds the copyright to all its images (© Henkin Brothers Archive Association (HBAA)). The Association includes direct descendants of the Henkin brothers.

== Bibliography ==
- В. Я. Файн, С. В. Вершинин «Таганрогские Сабсовичи и их потомки» ("Taganrog Sabsovichi and their descendants")Таганрогские Сабсовичи и их потомки
- М. А. Гонтмахер. "Евреи на Донской земле". (Jews in the Don region) 2-е изд. Ростов-н/Д, 2005].
- The '2Henkin2' photography exhibition: The catalogue of the 2017 exhibition at the State Hermitage Museum, including work shown as well as four articles (by Dimitri Ozerkov, curator of the exhibition and head of the Department of Contemporary Art of the State Hermitage; Olga Walther, granddaughter of Yakov Henkin and head of the Henkin Brothers Archive Association; Dmitri Konradt, prominent photographer; and Daria Panayotti, art historian and critic), was published by The State Hermitage Publishers in 2017 (ISBN 978-5-93572-735-2)
- Razumov, A., Editor. “The Leningrad Martyrologue – Memorial Book of Victims of Political Repression, Volume 7: January 1938.” The Russian National Library Publishers, St. Petersburg, 2007 Ленинградский мартиролог том 7
- Henkin, Evgeny, and Henkin, Yakov, photographers. "Les Frères Henkin: Photographes à Leningrad et à Berlin." Texts by: Daniel Girardin, Denis A. Maslov, Lorraine de Meaux, Gueorgui Pinkhassov and Olga Walther. Les Editions Noir Sur Blanc; Lausanne, Switzerland, and Paris, France; 2019. ISBN 978-2-88250-588-0
