= Yosef Eliyahu Henkin =

American rabbi

Rabbi Yosef Eliyahu Henkin
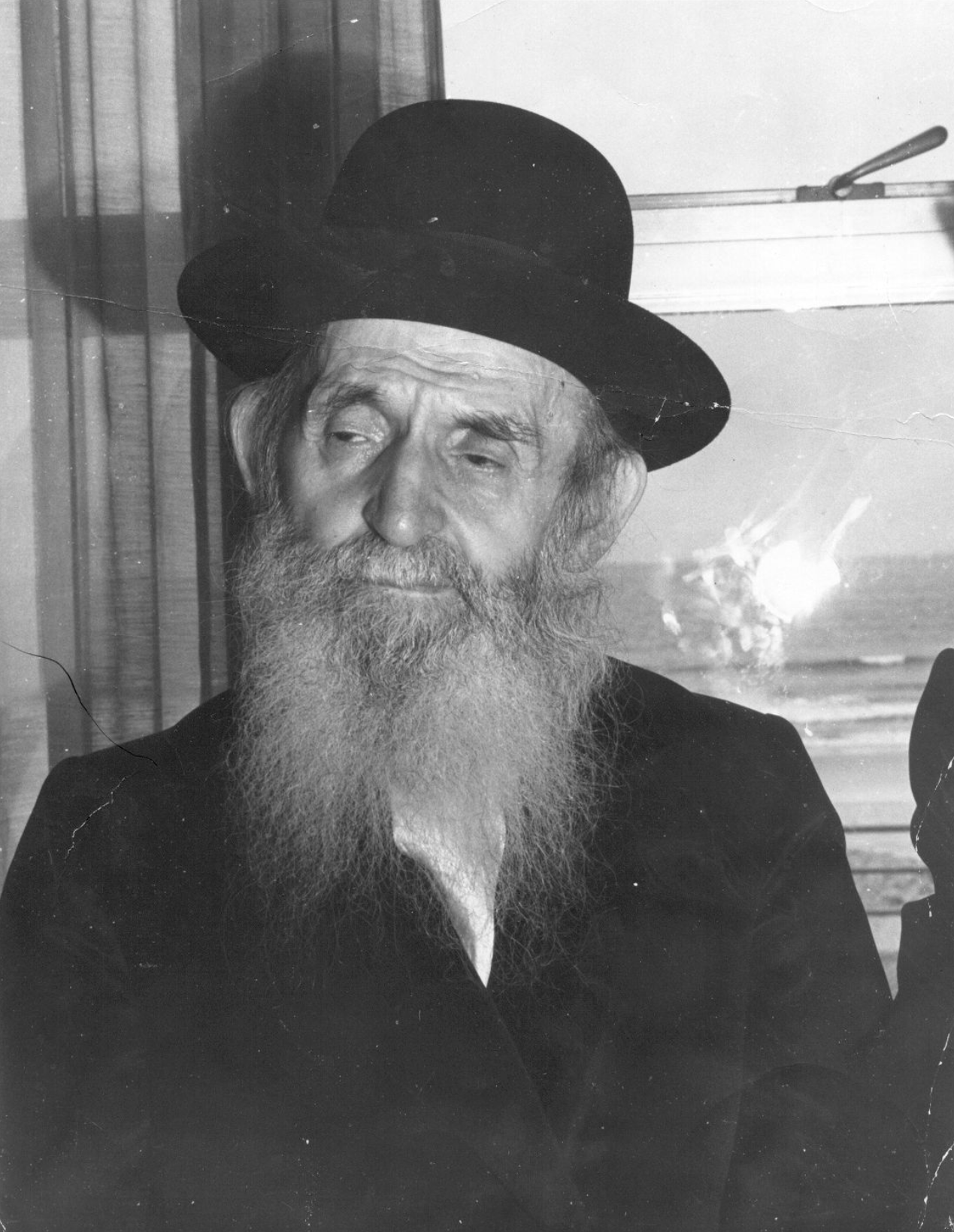

Personal life
- Born: 1881 Klimavichy, Russian Empire
- Died: August 11, 1973 (aged 91–92) Manhattan, New York, US

Religious life
- Religion: Judaism

Rabbi Yosef Eliyahu Henkin (1881–1973) was a prominent Orthodox rabbi in the United States.

== Biography ==
He was born in 1881 in Klimavichy, Belarus, then in the Russian Empire, and studied at the Slutzker Yeshiva under Rabbi Isser Zalman Meltzer. He received rabbinical ordination (semichah) from Meltzer, and he was also ordained by Rabbis Yaakov Dovid Wilovsky, Boruch Ber Leibowitz and Yechiel Michel Epstein. According to Henkin's grandson, Henkin did not remember receiving ordination from Rabbi Epstein, and for his ordination from Rabbi Wilovsky he was not tested by Wilovsky himself, but by Wilovsky's son-in-law. After serving as rabbi in a number of Russian towns, he emigrated to America in 1922. In 1925 he became the director of Ezras Torah, which provided assistance to scholars. He served in that capacity until his death.

Following his decisions, Ezras Torah published an annual calendar (luach) listing the synagogue and liturgical customs for each day, specifying the specific practice of that day.

He had two sons: Louis Henkin, a legal academician and writer, and Rabbi Hillel Henkin, an educator in Connecticut. His grandson was Rabbi Yehuda Herzl Henkin, an Orthodox rabbi in Israel. Many of Yosef Eliyahu Henkin's opinions are only known through the responsa of his grandson.

Henkin died on August 11, 1973 at his home in New York.

== Positions on Jewish law ==
Henkin considered Reform marriage as a form of common law marriage requiring a Jewish divorce (get).

He was opposed to the practice in yeshivas and synagogues of pausing in the middle of the Rosh Hashanah services for kiddush and refreshments before shofar-blowing. (His stance is defended in his grandson's responsa.)

If a Jewish storekeeper completed a form to sell his chametz to a non-Jew before Passover, yet he kept his store open, selling chametz on Passover and keeping the profits for himself, Henkin said that this proved the "Chametz sale" to be a fraud and therefore invalid. (Rabbi Moshe Feinstein, on the other hand, said the sale was still valid.)

Henkin said that where tuna have been caught it is permissible to check only a few of each batch and not each individual fish; Feinstein said that each fish needed to be checked for kosher markings that it was in fact a tuna, and not some other fish.

=== Manhattan eruv ===
In 1936, Henkin said that Rabbi Yehoshua Seigel's 1905 Manhattan eruv could no longer be relied on because he had only acquired permission for ten years. Henkin's main argument why the eruv could no longer be relied on was because of the construction of bridges that crossed Manhattan’s waterfront.

On March 15, 1960, he signed on a Statement of the Vaad L’Maan Tikkun Eruvin B’Manhattan that stated the need for a Manhattan eruv.

On July 12, 1961, Henkin wrote a letter saying that there was a sound basis to establish an eruv in Manhattan. He wrote that, until the eruv received the written support of most of the rabbis of Manhattan, the permission for the eruv would only be for times of great need.

== Position on Israel ==
Henkin vigorously opposed Zionism, but once the State of Israel was established he declared the need to support its continued existence, and denounced those who tried to undermine it. In 1959 he wrote:

I was shocked to read in Chomoteinu (Cheshvan 5719) the slanderous notion that we are required to give our lives to frustrate and resist the efforts of the State of Israel in its struggle against those who would rise up against them. This was stated as a psak din based on "Israel is restricted from rebelling against the nations." (Ketubot 111a) [...] but once done, though the admonition was ignored, we are required to support them with mesirut nefesh. [...] Once the state was declared, anyone who plays into the hands of the nations of the world even where there is no imminent danger, is clearly an informer and pursuer (rodef). All the more when there is danger to destruction of life in so doing. [...] Those essays I wrote before the advent of the state (many of which have been reprinted in my book Leiv Ivra) will testify to the fact that I am not a supporter of the government, and I objected to the entire idea of a state. (It is for this reason I am not a member of Agudah so that I not be judged incorrectly as one who agreed with their position in the founding of the state.) But now it is our obligation that we all support the state in the face of its external enemies and then go on to guide it in the ways of Torah.

== Bibliography ==
- Rabbi Norman E. Frimer and Dov I. Frimer, "Reform Marriages in Contemporary Halakhic Responsa," Tradition, Vol. 21, No. 3 (Fall 1984), 7 - 39;
- Henkin, Rabbi Yehuda, Equality Lost, Chapter 16 "Rabbi Yosef Eliyahu Henkin", pp. 156–180 (biography of Rabbi Yosef Eliyahu Henkin by his grandson), Jerusalem: Urim Publications, 1999.
