= Stanislav Rudenko =

Russian footballer

Personal information
- Full name: Stanislav Viktorovich Rudenko
- Date of birth: 26 October 1962 (age 64)
- Place of birth: Rostov-on-Don, Russian SFSR
- Height: 1.86 m (6 ft 1 in)
- Position: Goalkeeper

Youth career
- ROShISP-10 Rostov-on-Don

Senior career*
Years	Team	Apps	(Gls)
1979	FC Spartak Oryol	18	(0)
1980–1981	PFC CSKA Moscow	0	(0)
1981–1985	FC SKA Rostov-on-Don	64	(0)
1986	FC Rostselmash Rostov-on-Don	29	(0)
1988	FC Torpedo Taganrog	6	(0)
1989	FC Kuban Krasnodar	10	(0)
1989	FC SKA Rostov-on-Don	9	(0)
1995	FC SKA Rostov-on-Don	39	(0)
1996	FC Kolos Taganrog	15	(0)
1996–1999	FC Chernomorets Novorossiysk	47	(0)
2000	FC Nosta Novotroitsk	16	(0)
2002	FC Spartak-Kavkaztransgaz Izobilny	4	(0)

Managerial career
- 2001: FC Lokomotiv Nizhny Novgorod (GK coach)
- 2004–2006: FC Chernomorets Novorossiysk (GK coach)
- 2008: FC SKA Rostov-on-Don (GK coach)
- * Club domestic league appearances and goals

Stanislav Viktorovich Rudenko (Russian: Станислав Викторович Руденко; born 26 October 1962) is a Russian football coach and a former player.

== Honours ==
Individual

- Toulon Tournament Best Goalkeeper: 1983
