= Andrei Vorobyov =

Russian footballer

Personal information
- Full name: Andrei Aleksandrovich Vorobyov
- Date of birth: 27 March 1982 (age 44)
- Place of birth: Rostov-on-Don, Russian SFSR
- Height: 1.74 m (5 ft 8 1/2 in)
- Position: Striker

Senior career*
Years	Team	Apps	(Gls)
1998–2000	FC Rostselmash-2 Rostov-on-Don	67	(10)
2000–2002	FC Rostselmash Rostov-on-Don	6	(0)
2003	FC SKA Rostov-on-Don	25	(5)
2004	FC Ural Yekaterinburg	12	(3)
2005	FC Salyut-Energia Belgorod	33	(19)
2006–2007	FC SKA Rostov-on-Don	55	(22)
2007–2008	FC Taganrog	28	(4)
2009	FC Bataysk-2007	0	(0)
- * Club domestic league appearances and goals

Andrei Aleksandrovich Vorobyov (Russian: Андрей Александрович Воробьёв; born 27 March 1982) is a former Russian professional footballer.

== Club career ==
He made his debut in the Russian Premier League in 2000 for FC Rostselmash Rostov-on-Don before being transferred following the end of the 2002 season.

== Honours ==
- Russian Cup finalist: 2003.

== Personal life ==
His father Aleksandr Vorobyov was a footballer, he made an appearance for the USSR national team.
