= Yehuda Henkin =

Israeli rabbi (1945–2020)

Yehuda Herzl Henkin יהודה הרצל הנקין
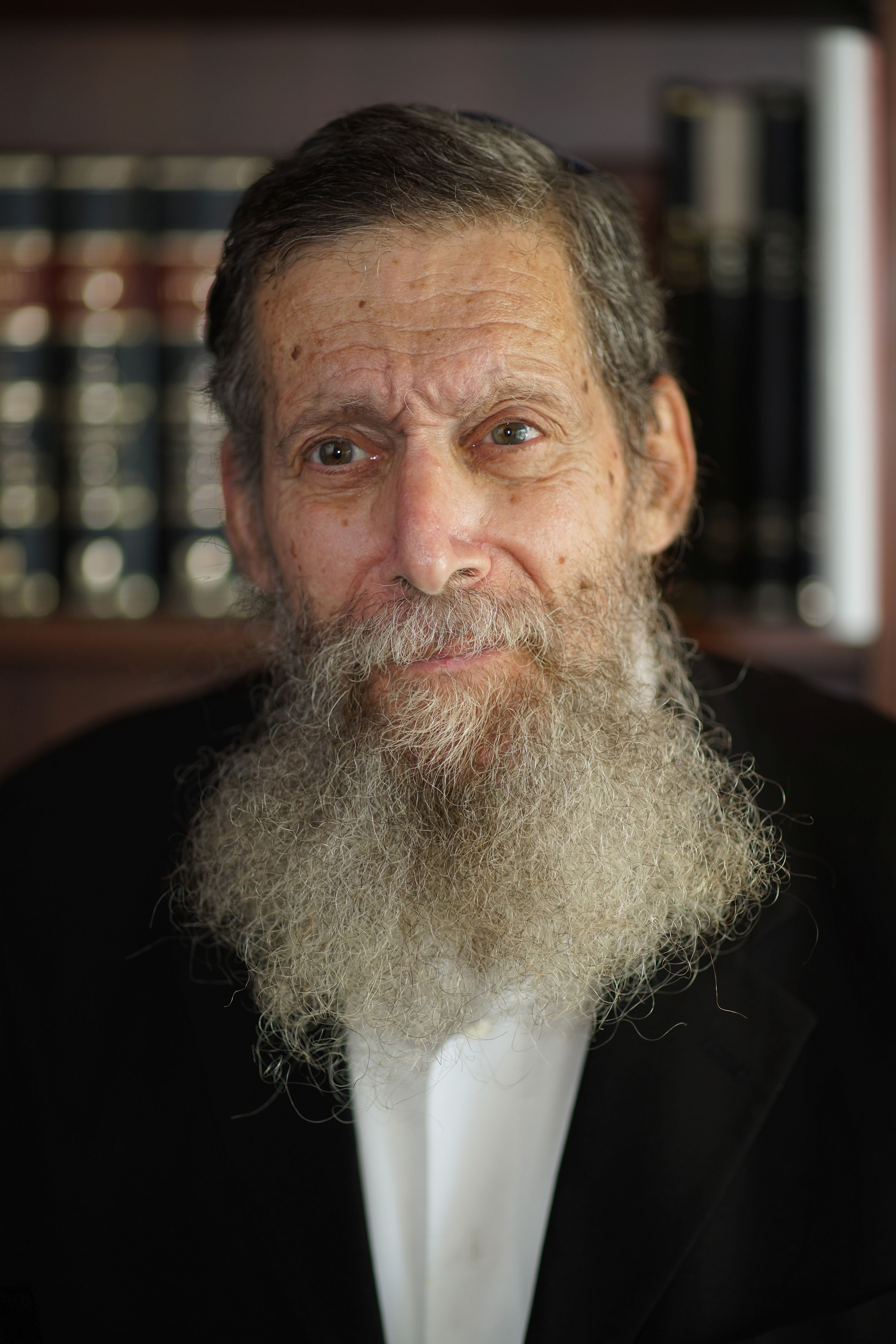
- Title: Rabbi

Personal life
- Born: 1945
- Died: 23 December 2020 (aged 74–75) Jerusalem, Israel

Religious life
- Religion: Judaism
- Denomination: Orthodox Judaism
- Yahrtzeit: 9 Tevet 5781

Rabbi Yehuda Herzl Henkin (Hebrew: יהודה הרצל הנקין; 1945 – 23 December 2020), author of the responsa Benei Banim, was a Religious Zionist and Modern Orthodox posek.

== Early life and education ==
Yehuda Henkin was born in Pennsylvania in 1945 and raised in New Haven, Connecticut. His father was Dr. Avraham Hillel Henkin, who headed the local Board of Jewish Education. After graduating from the Yeshivah of Flatbush High School in 1962, he studied five years with his grandfather, Rabbi Yosef Eliyahu Henkin, from whom he received semichah. He also received semichah from Rabbi Yehuda Gershuni. Along with independent Torah study; he also heard lessons from Rabbi Aharon Soloveitchik (he also studied for a short period at the Lakewood Yeshiva). During this time he also completed a master's degree in the sociology of religion at Columbia University. His uncle was Professor Louis Henkin, who taught international law at Columbia. He and his wife Chana Henkin moved to Israel in 1972 and he served as the Rabbi of the Beit She'an valley before moving to Jerusalem.

== Personal life ==
He lived in Jerusalem, with his wife, Chana Henkin, founder and head of Nishmat, the Institute for Advanced Jewish Studies for Women. His son, Rabbi Eitam Henkin, and his daughter-in-law Naama were murdered by Palestinian terrorists on 1 October 2015, in front of their four young children.

His closest student was Rabbi David Sperling, head of the Bet Midrash at Nishmat, who studied with him for over thirty years.

== Scholarly books ==
Between 1981 and 2004 he published four volumes elucidating Jewish Law in a book called Benei Banim (Hebrew). In the summer of 2019 he published a book of biblical exegesis called Mahalakhim Ba-Mikra.

== Responsa ==
Henkin discusses whether those who believe that the Lubavitcher Rebbe is the messiah are considered to be heretics, ruling that they are not.

He cites his grandfather R. Yosef Eliyahu Henkin that hearing Shofar and Megillah cannot be done by radio, and that therefore Kol Isha does not apply over the radio. Henkin was unsure whether this applies to hearing a woman's voice on television. He allows women studying Talmud. He permits dancing on the Sabbath, but prohibits clapping hands. He permits a man to shake a woman's hand when offered, and vice versa.

== Deferring to the Arukh HaShulkan ==
He cites his grandfather R. Yosef Eliyahu Henkin as considering the Aruch HaShulchan as more definitive than the Mishnah Berurah.

- It is a more recent authority relative to the Mishnah Berurah. Although Aruch HaShulchan on Choshen Mishpat preceded the Mishnah Berurah, the part on Orach Chayim was published up to 10 years after Mishnah Berurah.
- He covers all of the Shulkhan Arukh
- More importantly, the Arukh HaShulchan reflects the minhagim of the time, while the Mishna Berurah is much more precedent/text-based.

== Partnership Minyan ==
He has written the major objection to the concept of a partnership minyan, particularly the issue of calling women to the Torah. In an article in the Edah journal on the subject, he provided point-by-point halakhic counterarguments, and also said:

Regardless of the arguments that can be proffered to permit women's aliyot [Torah-reading] today— that kevod ha-tsibbur can be waived, that it does not apply today when everyone is literate, that it does not apply when the olim rely on the (male) ba`al qeri’ah and do not themselves read—women's aliyot remain outside the consensus, and a congregation that institutes them is not Orthodox in name and will not long remain Orthodox in practice. In my judgment, this is an accurate statement now and for the foreseeable future, and I see no point in arguing about it.

== Bibliography ==
- Responsa Benei Vanim, 4 volumes
- A Biblical commentary, Hibah Yeteirah (Brooklyn: Lambda Publishers)
- Equality Lost: Essays in Torah Commentary, Halacha and Jewish Thought (Urim Publications, 1999)
- New Interpretations on the Parsha (Ktav, 2001)
- "Qeri'at ha-Torah by Women: Where We Stand Today" (PDF). Edah.org 1:2. 2001. Archived from the original (PDF) on 2006-07-10.
- Responsa on Contemporary Jewish Women's Issues (Ktav, 2003)
- Understanding Tzniut: Modern Controversies in the Jewish Community (Urim Publications, 2008)
- "Is Handshaking a Torah Violation?" (PDF). Hakirah.org, vol. 4. 2007.
- Pirkei Ideologia Pirkei Hadracha (New York, Mizrahi HaTzair, 1965)
- Perakim B'HavanatMe'orot Zmanenu (Jerusalem 1994)
- Mahalachim Bamikra: Sugyot B'Torah M'Briat HaOlam v'adMatan Torah (Jerusalem 2020, edited by R. Eitam Shimon Henkin)
