= Avdey Ter-Oganyan =

Russian painter

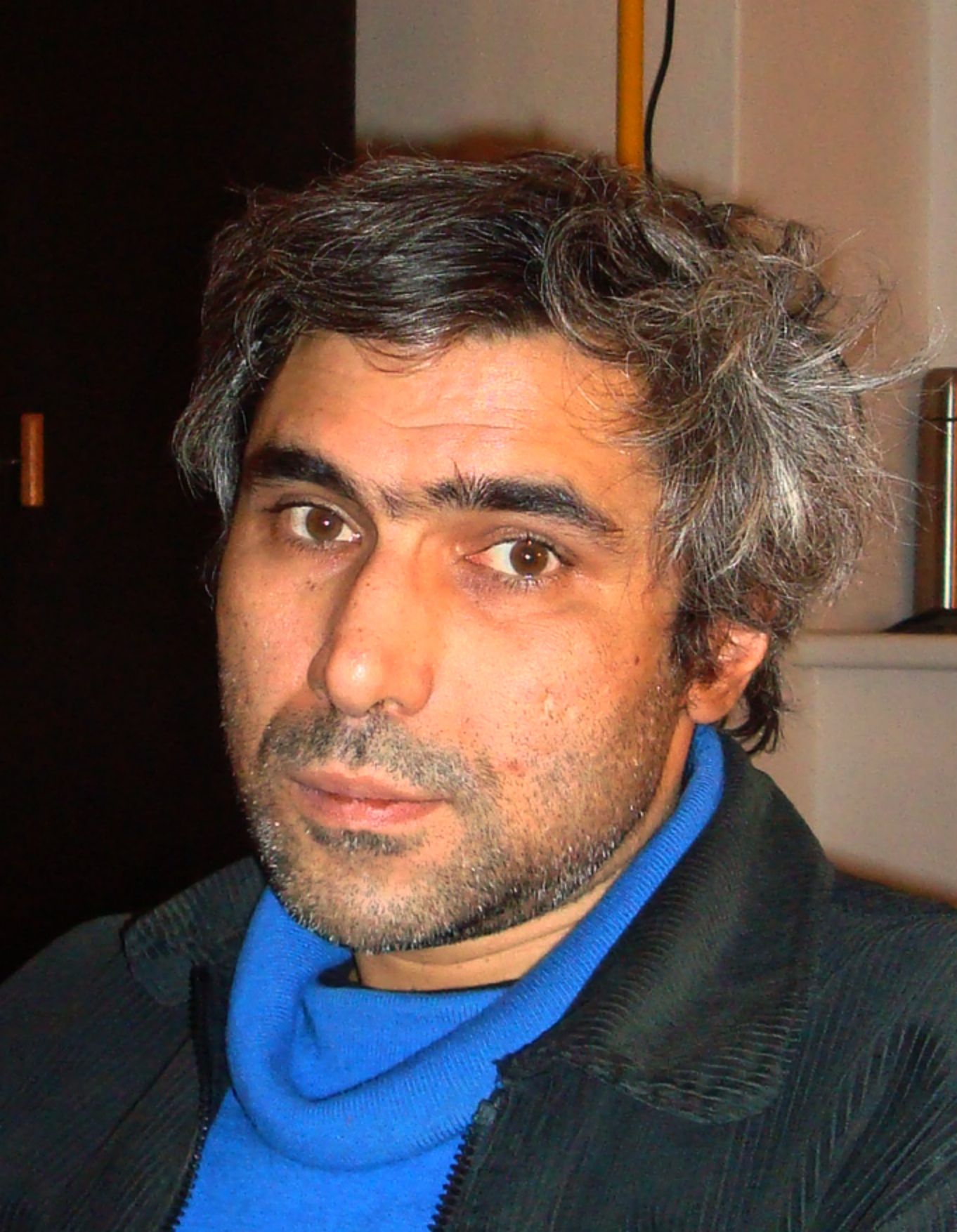
Avdey Ter-Oganyan, 2008

Avdey Stepanovich Ter-Oganyan (Russian: Авде́й Степа́нович Тер-Оганья́н; born December 9, 1961, Rostov-on-Don) is a Russian painter, one of the prominent representatives of the Moscow actionism.

He is famous for extravagant and sometimes provocative art actions. His practice includes installations and performances.

In the ranking of the magazine ArtChronika 50 most influential people in Russian art 2010 Avdey Ter-Oganyan took 23rd place.

He currently lives and works in Prague.
