= Stefan Grigorievich Samko =

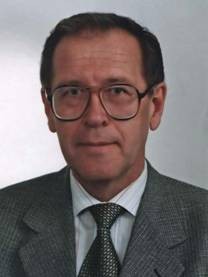
- Born: March 28, 1941 (age 85); Rostov-na-Donu, Russia
- Education: Belarusian State University (PhD, 1967); Steklov Mathematical Institute (DrSc, 1978)
- Spouse: Natasha Samko
- Children: Valentin Samko
- Scientific career
- Fields: Mathematics
- Workplaces: Rostov State University; Algarve University
- Doctoral advisor: Fyodor Gakhov
- Website: Stefan Samko's home page

Stefan Grigorievich Samko (Russian: Стефан Григорьевич Самко; born March 28, 1941) is a mathematician active in the field of functional analysis, function spaces and operator theory. He is a retired professor of Mathematics at Algarve University and Rostov State University.

== Career ==
=== Research activity ===
S. Samko has more than 260 research papers spread throughout the areas of,

- Harmonic Analysis and Operator Theory in Variable Exponent Function Spaces;
- Function spaces;
- Potential type operators;
- Hypersingualr integrals and the method of approximative inverse operators;
- Fractional calculus of one and many variables;
- Integral equations of the first kind (including multi-dimensional ones).

=== Teaching activity ===
He was the adviser for 21 PhD students, from Russia and Portugal. The complete list is:

- Boris Rubin
- Vladimir Nogin
- Alexandre Skorikov
- Salaudin Umarkhadzhiev
- Alexandre Guinzbourg
- Hamzat Murdaev†
- Boris Vakulov
- Anatolii Chuvenkov
- Pavel Pavlov
- Galina Emgusheva
- Galina Kostetskaya
- Taus Khamidova
- Mahmadiar Yakhshiboev
- Esmira Alisultanova
- Anna Abramyan
- Zarema Mussalaeva
- Alexey Karapetyants
- Elena Urnysheva
- Alexandre Almeida
- Rogério Cardoso
- Humberto Rafeiro

== Bibliography ==
- Samko, Stefan; Kilbas, Anatoly A.; Marichev, Oleg I. (1993). Fractional Integrals and Derivatives: Theory and Applications. Gordon & Breach Science Publishers. ISBN 978-2881248641.
- Samko, Stefan (2002). Hypersingular Integrals and Their Applications. CRC Press. ISBN 9780415272681.
- Karapetiants, Nikolai; Samko, Stefan (2002). Equations with Involutive Operators and Their Applications. Birkhäuser.
- Kokilashvili, Vakhtang; Meskhi, Alexander; Rafeiro, Humberto; Samko, Stefan (2016). Integral Operators in Non-Standard Function Spaces: Volume 1: Variable Exponent Lebesgue and Amalgam Spaces. Birkhäuser. ISBN 978-3319210148.
- Kokilashvili, Vakhtang; Meskhi, Alexander; Rafeiro, Humberto; Samko, Stefan (2016). Integral Operators in Non-Standard Function Spaces. Volume 2: Variable Exponent Hölder, Morrey–Campanato and Grand Spaces. Birkhäuser. ISBN 978-3-319-21018-6.
