= Anatoly Morozov (footballer) =

Russian footballer

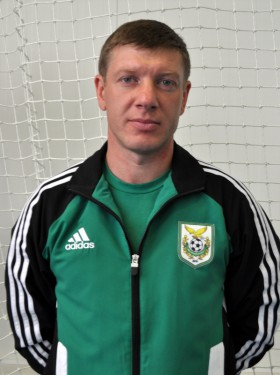

Personal information
- Full name: Anatoly Nikolaevich Morozov
- Date of birth: 23 October 1973 (age 53)
- Place of birth: Rostov-on-Don, Russian SFSR
- Height: 1.74 m (5 ft 8 1/2 in)
- Positions: Defender; midfielder; striker

Team information
- Current team: FC Forte Taganrog (assistant coach)

Senior career*
Years	Team	Apps	(Gls)
1991	FC Tsement Novorossiysk	12	(0)
1992	FC Rostselmash-d Rostov-on-Don	34	(4)
1993–1994	FC SKA Rostov-on-Don	52	(3)
1995–1997	FC Torpedo Taganrog	110	(13)
1998–2000	FC Chernomorets Novorossiysk	73	(0)
2001–2003	FC Rostov	11	(0)
2004	FC Chernomorets Novorossiysk	23	(0)
2005–2006	FC Volgar-Gazprom Astrakhan	62	(0)
2007	FC Chernomorets Novorossiysk	9	(0)
2008	FC Taganrog	29	(1)
2010	FC Chernomorets Novorossiysk	17	(0)
2011	FC Slavyansky Slavyansk-na-Kubani	6	(0)

Managerial career
- 2009: FC Chernomorets Novorossiysk (asst coach/administrator)
- 2011–2013: FC Slavyansky Slavyansk-na-Kubani (assistant)
- 2013–2015: FC Vityaz Krymsk (assistant)
- 2015–2022: FC Chernomorets Novorossiysk (assistant)
- 2017: FC Chernomorets Novorossiysk (caretaker)
- 2022–2023: FC Kuban-Holding Pavlovskaya (assistant)
- 2023–: FC Forte Taganrog (assistant)
- * Club domestic league appearances and goals

Anatoly Nikolaevich Morozov (Russian: Анатолий Николаевич Морозов; born 23 October 1973) is a Russian professional football coach and a former player. He is an assistant coach with FC Forte Taganrog.

== International ==
In 2003, he was granted Armenian citizenship in order to qualify as a defender for the national team. He received his first call-up in August 2003, though he never went on to gain any caps for Armenia.
