= Andrei Redkin =

Russian footballer

Personal information
- Full name: Andrei Pavlovich Redkin
- Date of birth: 31 May 1972 (age 54)
- Place of birth: Rostov-on-Don, Russian SFSR
- Height: 1.80 m (5 ft 11 in)
- Position: Defender

Youth career
- RO UOR Rostov-on-Don

Senior career*
Years	Team	Apps	(Gls)
1990–1992	FC SKA Rostov-on-Don	81	(1)
1993	FC Torpedo Moscow	0	(0)
1993	→ FC Torpedo-d Moscow	32	(0)
1994–1995	FC Rostselmash Rostov-on-Don	32	(0)
1995–1997	FC SKA Rostov-on-Don	62	(0)
1997	FC Volgar-Gazprom Astrakhan	14	(1)
1998–2004	FC SKA Rostov-on-Don	186	(0)
2006–2008	FC Progress Kamensk-Shakhtinsky (amateur)		
2009	FC Mir-Dangazdobycha-2 Sulin		
2010	FC Progress Kamensk-Shakhtinsky (amateur)		
- * Club domestic league appearances and goals

Andrei Pavlovich Redkin (Russian: Андрей Павлович Редькин; born 31 May 1972) is a former Russian football player.
