= Georgy Khazagerov =

Russian scholar

Georgy Georgievich Khazagerov (Russian: Георгий георгиевич Хазагеров; 29 June 1949 – 31 January 2026) is a Russian scholar and Professor of Russian Language Department at Southern Federal University, He is an author of a wide range of educational publications and books on rhetoric and Russian philology including coursebooks on rhetoric for university students.

== Early life and education ==
Khazagerov was born in Rostov-on-Don, USSR. He obtained a PhD from Krasnodar State University for his research on the metalinguistic properties of tropes and figures.

== Career ==
Over the last ten years he has been doing research in rhetoric as an institution of state-building and the shaping of the society. He has an interest in rhetoric of totalitarianism of the Soviet period. His articles have been published in science and popular science journals and newspapers. He is regularly invited as keynote speaker at all-Russian and international conferences and meetings on language and cultural studies.

Current research and consultancy interests include ancient theories of style and the theory of tropes and rhetoric figures, as well as their reflection in modern cultures and their interpretation in present-day Russian eloquence.

== Books ==
- Ritorika totalitarisma: stanovlenie, rassvet, kollaps (sovetskii opyt) (Rhetoric of Totalitarianism: Formation, Zenith, Collapse (The Soviet Experience)). Rostov-on-Don, RSU Publishing House, 2012.
- Rhetoric Dictionary (in Russian): Moscow: Nauka, 2009. ISBN 978-5-9765-0286-4 (Flinta), ISBN 978-5-02-034884-4 (Nauka).
- Osnovy teorii literatury (The Principles of Literary Theory). Rostov-on-Don: Phoenix, 2009. ISBN 978-5-222-15960-6.
- Ritorika (Rhetoric). Rostov-on-Don, Phoenix, 2008, 3rd ed., ISBN 978-5-222-14065-9.
- Partiya, vlast’ i ritorika (The Party, Power and Rhetoric). Moscow: Europe, 2006 ISBN 5-9739-0060-6.
- Politicheskaya ritorika (Political Rhetoric). Moscow: Nikkolo-Media, 2002 ISBN 5-901488-04-0.
- with E. Kornilova Ritorika dlya delovogo cheloveka (Rhetoric for a Businessman). Moscow: Flinta, 2001. ISBN 5-89349-299-4.
- Vvedenie v russkuyu filologiyu (Introduction to Russian Philology). Yekaterinburg: Delovaya kniga, 2000. ISBN 5-88687-083-0.
- with N. Karachenskaya “Ob obrazekh” – pervoye filologicheskoye sochineniye na Rusi (“On Images” – the First Philological Treatise in Russia). Rostov-on-Don: RSU Publishing House, 1995.
- with S. Iliyasova A Dictionary of Russian Homoforms (in Russian). Rostov-on-Don: RSU Publishing House, 1995.
- with S. Megentesov Ocherk filosofii sub’ektno-predikatnykh form v yazykovom i nauchno-istoricheskom prostranstve (A Philosophical Sketch of Subjectival Predicate Forms in the Language, Cultural and Historical context). Rostov-on-Don: RSU Publishing House, 1995.

== Publications ==
- Obessmyslivaniye nauchnogo diskursa kak ob’ektivny protsess (The Meaninglessness of Scientific Discourse as an Objective Process). Sotsiologicheskij Zhurnal, 2010, No. 2.
- Ritorika vs stilistika: semioticheskiy i institutsional’nyi aspect (Rhetoric vs Stylistics: Semiotic and Institutional Aspect). Sotsiologicheskij Zhurnal, 2008, No. 3.
- Topos vs Kontsept (Topos vs Concept). Proceedings of Southern Federal University. Philological Sciences, 2008, No. 3.
- Deklarativnaya ritorika kak ugroza ekologii russkogo yazyka (Declarative Rhetoric as a Menace to the Ecology of the Russian Language). In Pragmatic Aspects of Communication, Moscow, 2007.
- Marginalii v oblasti tropov kak kontekstual’nyi fenomen (Marginalia in the Domain of Tropes as a Contextual Phenomenon). 10th Vinogradov Readings. In Tekst i kontekst: lingvisticheskii, literaturovedcheskii i metodicheskii aspekty. Vol. 1. Moscow, 2007.
- Pafos i patos: kategoriya normy v tvorchestve Vladimira Vysotskogo (Pathos and Πάθος: the Category of Norm in Vladimir Vysotsky’s Works). In Poeziya i pesnya V.S. Vysotskogo. Kaliningrad, 2006.
- Os’ intentsii i os’ konventsii: k poiskam novoi funktsional’nosti v lingvokul’turologicheskikh issledovaniyakh (The Axis of Intension and the Axis of Convention: in Search for New Functionality in Linguocultural Studies). Sotsiologicheskij Zhurnal, 2006, No. 1-2, pp 40–62.
- Odichaniye rituala (The Ritual Running Wild). Znamya, 2006, No. 7.
- Kul’tura-1, kul’tura-2 i gumanitarnaya kul’tura (Culture-1, Cultura-2 and the Humanitarian Culture). Znamya, 2005, No. 3.
- Metaplazm i variant (Metaplasm and Variant). 7th Vinogradov Readings. In Russkii yazyk v mnogoaspektnom osveshchenii. Moscow, 2004.
- Perspektivy leksikograficheskogo opisaniya dannykh sotsiologicheskogo oprosa (The Perspectives of Lexicographic Interpretation of Sociological Survey Data). Sotsiologicheskij Zhurnal, 2003, No. 2.
- Chto slyshit slushayushchii? (What Can a Listener Hear?). Otechestvennye Zapiski, 2002, No. 5.
- Politicheskaya ritorika: s chego nachat’? (Political Rhetoric: What Shall We Start With?). Zhurnal o vyborakh, 2002, No.3.
- Personosfera russkoi kul’tury (The Personosphere of Russian Culture). Novy Mir, 2002, No. 1.
- Sistema ubezhdayushchei rechi kak gomeostaz: oratorika, gomiletika, didaktika, simvolika (The System of Persuasive Speech as Homeostasis: Oratorics, Homiletics, Didactics, Symbolics). Sotsiologicheskij Zhurnal, 2001, No. 3.
- Zhretsi, rytsari i slugi. Priklucheniya metafory, metonimii i simvola v nauchnom i obshchestvennom diskurse (Priests, Knights and Servants. The Adventures of Metaphor, Metonymy and Symbol in Scientific and Social Discourse). Znanie-sila, 2001, No. 12.
- Skifsky slovar’ (A Scythian Dictionary). Znamya, 1999, No. 12.
- Vo dni somnenii… (prislushivaemsya k svidetel’stvam russkogo yazyka (In days of doubt... (Taking a Listen to the Russian Language Records)). Znamya, 1999, No. 3.
- Na razvalinakh Vavilonskoi bashni (On the Ruins of the Tower of Babel). RELGA. Nauchno-Kul’turologicheskii Zhurnal (The Rostov E Journal), 1999, No. 21 [27]. www.relga.ru.
- Poeticheskoye tvorchestvo Vladimira Vysotskogo v kontekste Drevnei Rusi i Sovetskoi Rossii (Vladimir Vysotsky’s Poetic Works in the Context of Ancient Rus’ and Soviet Russia) RELGA. Nauchno-Kul’turologicheskii Zhurnal (The Rostov E Journal), 1999, No. 23 [29]. www.relga.ru.
- [http://blackalpinist.com/scherbakov/Praises/xazagerov3.html {{lang|ru|Parabola i paradigma v tvorchestve Vysotskogo, Okudzhavy i Shcherbakova (Parable and Paradigm in the Works of Vysotsky, Okudzhava and Shcherbakov).] Mir Vysotskogo. Issledovaniya i Materialy.}} Moscow, 1999, Vol. 2 (3).
- Izbiratel’noe vozdeistvie rechevykh sredstv na bol’shie polushariya golovnogomozga (The Selective Impact of Verbal Means of Communication on Cerebral Hemispheres). Valeologiya. Journal of Health and Life Sciences. Rostov-on-Don, 1998, No.2.
- K modelirovaniyu yazykovoi sposobnosti cheloveka s oporoi na polysharnye moduli (Language Capacity Modelling Using Hemispherical Modules). Izvestiya Vuzov. Severo-Kavkazskii Region: Social Sciences, 1998, No. 3.
- Semidesyatye. Dvoinichestvo? Dvoemiriye? Binarnost’? (The 1970s. Doppelgängerism? Bi-worldness? Binarity?). Znamya, 1998, No. 12.
- “Takozhde i ty, cheloveche…” Antopodozis: neirolingvistichesky i sotsiokul’turny aspekty (“And you, the human, as well…” Antapodosis: neurolinguistic and socio-cultural aspects). Chelovek, 1998, No.1.
- Tipy russkikh omoform i ikh avtomaticheskoye pazvedeniye (Types of Russian Homoforms and Their Automatic Distinction). Scientific and Technical Information Processing, Vol. 2, 1997, No. 12.
- “Ne k nevedushchim bo pishem…” Ob osobennostyakh russkogo ritoricheskogo myshleniya (“In our writing, there is nothing that you cannot read clearly and understand…” On the Characteristics of Russian Rhetorical Mindset). Chelovek, 1995, No. 6.
- “Metayazykovoye yavleniye” kak klyuchevaya kategoriya postroeniya gumanitarnykh baz znaniy (“The Metalinguistic Phenomenon” as a Key Category in Humanitarian Knowledge Acquisition). Scientific and Technical Information Processing, 1995, Vol. 2, No. 9.
- Malye kommunikativnye zhanry kak podkhod k sozdaniyu novykh informatsionnykh tekhnologii (Micro Genres of Communication in the Creation of New Information Technologies). Scientific and Technical Information Processing, 1994, Vol. 2, No. 1.
- “O obrasekh”: Ioann, Khirovosk, Trifon (“On Images”: John, Hirovosk, Tryphon). Izvestiya RAN: Literatura i Yazyk, 1994, No. 1.
- Funktsionirovaniye figur i tropov v “Slove o polku Igoreve” i “Zadonshchine” (The Functions of figures and tropes in “The Tale of Igor's Campaign” and “Zadonshchina”). Philological Sciences, 1990, No. 3.
- “Poeticheskaya” povest’ ob Azove i eyo mesto v istorii russkogo literaturnogo yazyka (The “Poetic” Tale about Azov and Its Place in the Russian Literary Language). Izvestiya Vuzov. Severo-Kavkazskii Region: Social Sciences, 1989, No. 1.
