= Serge Polyanichko =

- Born: Serge Alexandrovich Polyanichko; 12 September 1974 (age 51); Rostov-on-Don, USSR
- Education: Saint Petersburg State Theatre Arts Academy, Mariinsky Theatre
- Occupations: Conductor, TV presenter
- Relatives: Alexander Polynichko

Serge Polyanichko (born 12 September 1974, Rostov-on-Don, USSR) is a Russian conductor, horn player and TV presenter, artistic Director and chief conductor of the Horn Orchestra of Russia(HOR), revived Russian culture of the 18th and 19th centuries - Horn orchestras. The son of the honored artist of Russia, conductor Maestro Alexander Polyanichko.

== Life and career ==
Serge Polyanichko was born on 12 September 1974 in Russia.

Serge Polyanichko began his training at the St. Petersburg State Conservatory's School for Gifted Children.

== Highlights ==
As a musician, Serge Polyanichko has collaborated with many orchestras.

== Tours and premieres ==
Serge Polyanichko has toured in Finland, Denmark, Germany, Austria, France, Switzerland, Spain, Italy, Israel, Great Britain, Chile, China, and United States.

Serge Polyanichko has taken part in productions at the Opera de Monte Carlo (Boris Godunov, 2006) and the Welsh National Opera (Mazepa, 2006 and Evgeny Onegin, 2008) as a conductor-assistant. In 2006 organized and headed a small symphonic orchestra "Nevsky". The same year he organized and became Head Director of the "Horn Orchestra of Russia". In 2007 he established the "Centre of Horn Music".

Serge Polyanichko always supports the new modern music and loves to do it at the first opportunity. He participated repeatedly in the scoring works by contemporary composers, in particular, St. Petersburg composers of the "Association of Russian Tradition" he became the first performer of many works of Mikhail Zhuravlev, Vladimir Anisimoff, and others.

== Recordings ==
At the moment widely known these records in the performance of the conductor Serge Polyanichko:

- Johann Sebastian Bach's "Aria" (HOR, 2009)
- Gioacchino Rossini's "Overture Wilhelm tell" (fragment) (HOR, 2009)
- Camille Saint-Saens "the Swan" (HOR, 2009)
- Johann Strauss ' Radetzky March" (HOR, 2009)
- Giulio Caccini's "Ave Maria" (HOR, 2009)
- Tomaso Giovanni Albinoni "Adagio" (HOR, 2009)
- Johannes Brahms "Hungarian dance No. 5" (HOR, 2009)
- Antonin Dvorak Slavonic dance No. 8" (HOR, 2009)
- Aram Khachaturian's "sabre Dance" (HOR, 2009)
- Maurice Ravel's "Bolero" (HOR, 2009)
- Boris Tishchenko "Qui Mariam" (HOR, 2009)
- Vladimir Anisimoff "Sinfonia Piccola" (HOR, 2009)
- Vaclav Trojan "the Romance of the frog" (HOR, 2009)
- Luigi Denza "Funiculì, Funiculà" (HOR, 2009)
- Russian folk song "Ah, the wide steppe..." (HOR, 2012)
- Dmitry Bortniansky "how glorious is our Lord in Zion" (HOR, 2012)
- Large number of Marches of military regiments that participated in the battles of the Patriotic War of 1812 (HOR, 2012)
