= Aleksandr Vorobyov =

Soviet footballer and Russian coach

Personal information
- Full name: Aleksandr Viktorovich Vorobyov
- Date of birth: 28 March 1962 (age 64)
- Place of birth: Rostov-on-Don, Russian SFSR
- Height: 1.72 m (5 ft 8 in)
- Position: Striker

Senior career*
| Years | Team | Apps | (Gls) |
| 1978–1989 | FC SKA Rostov-on-Don | 316 | (89) |
| 1990 | FC Rostselmash Rostov-on-Don | 31 | (9) |
| 1991–1993 | Kokkolan Palloveikot | 53 | (23) |
| 1993 | FF Jaro | 9 | (1) |
| 1994–1996 | FC Rostselmash Rostov-on-Don | 70 | (7) |

International career
| 1984 | USSR | 1 | (0) |
| 1986–1988 | USSR (Olympic) | 1 | (0) |

Managerial career
- 2006: FC SKA Rostov-on-Don (assistant)
- 2008: FC SKA Rostov-on-Don (reserves)
- 2009–2010: FC Bataysk-2007
- * Club domestic league appearances and goals

Aleksandr Viktorovich Vorobyov (Russian: Александр Викторович Воробьёв; born 28 March 1962) is a Russian football coach and a former Soviet player.

== Honours ==
- Soviet Cup winner: 1981.

== International career ==
Vorobyov played his only game for USSR on 19 August 1984, a friendly against Mexico.

== Personal life ==
His son Andrei Vorobyov also played football professionally.
