= Sviatoslav Nikitenko =

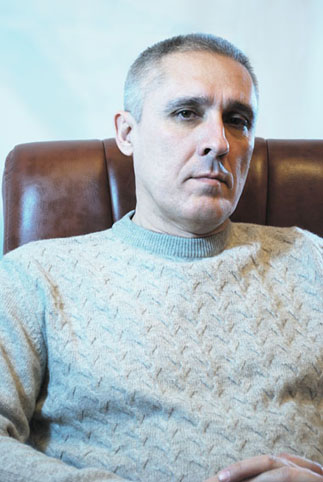
- Sviatoslav Nikitenko
- Born: 15 April 1960 (age 65); Rostov-on-Don, USSR, now Russia
- Known for: cameo carving
- Website: www.cameos.com.ua

Sviatoslav Nikitenko (Ukrainian: Нікітéнко Святослáв Олексíйович, Nikitenko Sviatoslav Oleksiiovych; born 15 April 1960), Ukrainian glyptic artist.

== Biography ==
Nikitenko was born on 15 April 1960 in the city of Rostov-on-Don (USSR). In 1982 he graduated from Prydniprovska State Academy of Civil Engineering and Architecture in Dnipropetrovsk, architectural faculty. After graduation, he worked as an architect. At the same time, he started wooden miniatures carving. At the beginning of the 1990s, he began to carve cameos and intaglios.

Since 1994 he has participated in art exhibitions in Ukraine and abroad. In 2000, he joined the National Artists' Union of Ukraine. As of 2012, he completed more than 460 gems.

== Works ==
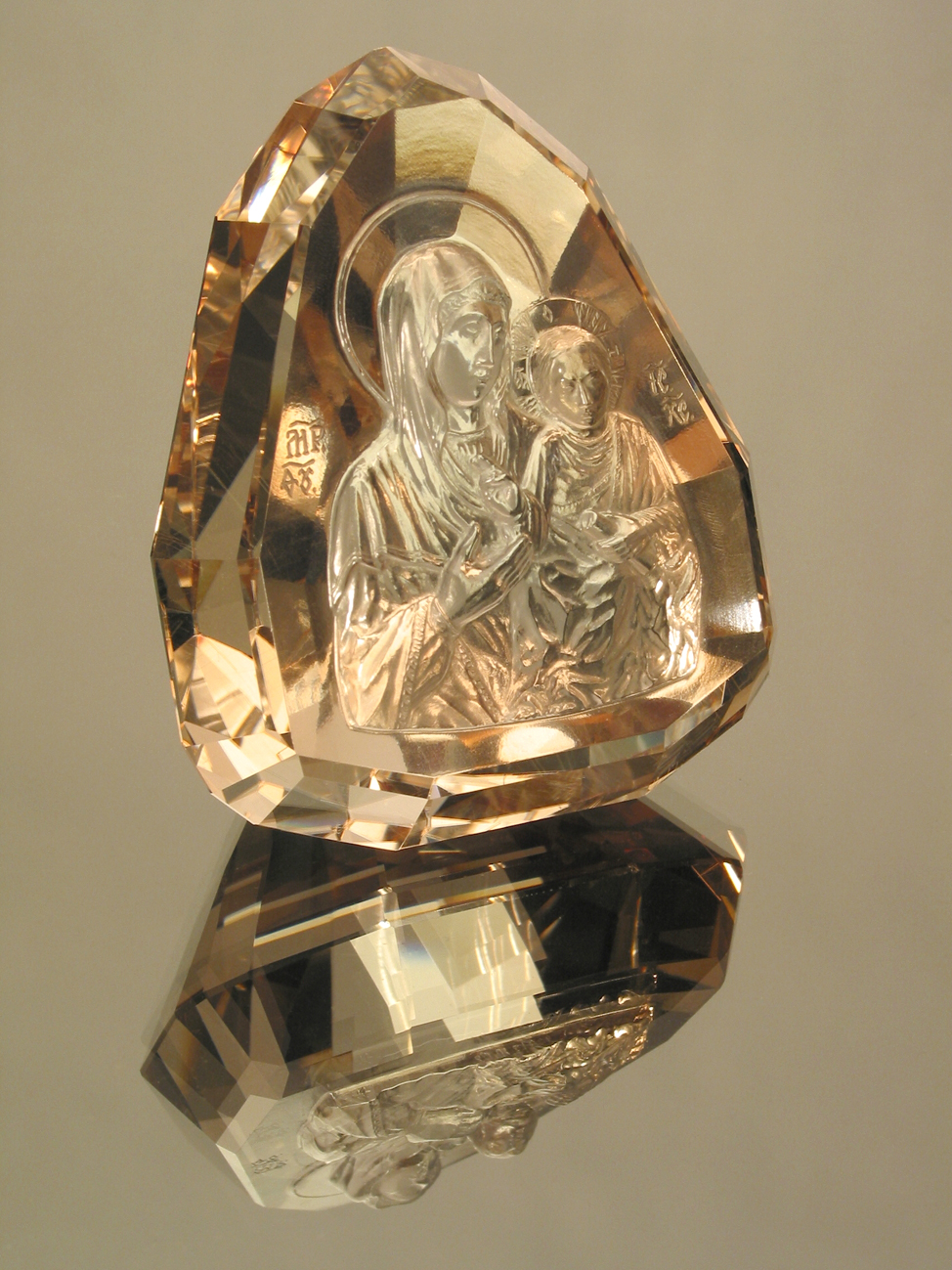
The Mother of God

The works are presented by cameos and intaglios. First cameos of Nikitenko were carved of bone, then the artist started to process gemstones. The main raw materials are citrine, topaz, carnelian, morion and other hard gemstones. In the middle of the 1990s Nikitenko started working on restoring of the traditions of the Christian glyptic, which was developed in Byzantine Empire and was also spread in Kievan Rus'. Some works of Nikitenko are devoted to the subjects of the Classical antiquity art, besides are presented by portraits The works are in own of Church and in private collections of many countries
