= Pavel Sviridenko =

Russian footballer

Personal information
- Full name: Pavel Anatolyevich Sviridenko
- Date of birth: 20 January 1985 (age 41)
- Place of birth: Volgograd, Russian SFSR
- Height: 1.84 m (6 ft 1/2 in)
- Position: Defender

Youth career
- 2002–2005: Rotor Volgograd

Senior career*
Years	Team	Apps	(Gls)
2002–2006	Rotor Volgograd	1	(0)
2003–2005	→ Rotor-2 Volgograd	22	(2)
2006–2007	Metallurg Krasnoyarsk	34	(0)
2008	Krasnodar	8	(0)
2008	Yelets	14	(1)
2009	SKA Rostov-on-Don	19	(1)
2009	Gomel	3	(0)
2010–2011	Fakel Voronezh	30	(2)
- * Club domestic league appearances and goals

Pavel Anatolyevich Sviridenko (Russian: Павел Анатольевич Свириденко; born 20 January 1985) is a former Russian professional football player.

== Club career ==
He played two seasons in the Russian Football National League for FC Metallurg Krasnoyarsk and FC Fakel Voronezh.
