= FC Progress Kamensk-Shakhtinsky =

Russian football club

Progress Kamensk-Shakhtinsky
- Full name: Football Club Progress Kamensk-Shakhtinsky
- Founded: 1962

FC Progress Kamensk-Shakhtinsky (Russian: «Прогресс» Каменск-Шахтинский) is a Russian football team from Kamensk-Shakhtinsky.

Currently it plays on amateur level in the Rostov Oblast league. It played professionally from 1963 to 1970 in the Soviet Second League. Their best result was 3rd place in 1964.

== See also ==
- FC Stroitel Kamensk-Shakhtinsky
