= Louis Henkin =

American law scholar (1917–2010)

- Born: Eliezer Henkin; November 11, 1917; Smolyany, Russia
- Died: October 14, 2010 (aged 92); Manhattan, New York, U.S.

Academic background
- Education: Yeshiva College; Harvard University

Academic work
- Discipline: International law
- Institutions: American Society of International Law; American Society for Political and Legal Philosophy; Columbia Law School

Louis Henkin (November 11, 1917 – October 14, 2010) was an American legal scholar. He was considered one of the most influential contemporary scholars of international law and the foreign policy of the United States. He was a former president of the American Society of International Law and of the American Society for Political and Legal Philosophy and University Professor Emeritus at Columbia Law School. He was until his death the chairman of the Center for the Study of Human Rights at Columbia University. He was a member of both the American Academy of Arts and Sciences and the American Philosophical Society.

== Biography ==
He was born Eliezer Henkin on November 11, 1917, in Smolyany, in present-day Belarus, the son of Rabbi Yosef Eliyahu Henkin, an authority in Jewish law. His mother died when he was two years old while she was helping deal with a dysentery outbreak and he and his five siblings were raised by his stepmother. The family emigrated to the United States in 1923, residing on the Lower East Side of Manhattan. Henkin grew up speaking Yiddish and attended the Rabbi Jacob Joseph School, learning to speak English in the process of helping his father mail letters to other rabbinic scholars across the country. He earned his undergraduate in 1937 from Yeshiva College, where he majored in mathematics, by which time he had adopted "Louis" as his first name. He took a chance at applying to Harvard Law School after seeing a fellow student at Yeshiva fill out an application. Once he was accepted he was able to attend with the financial assistance of his sister and graduated with a Bachelor of Laws with the class of 1940. After graduating, he served as a law clerk to Judge Learned Hand of the United States Court of Appeals for the Second Circuit.

Henkin enlisted in the United States Army in June 1941 and saw action during World War II in the European Theater in Sicily, Italy, France and Germany. While with a 13-man artillery observation unit serving near Toulon, he was awarded the Silver Star for an incident in which he was able to use his ability to speak Yiddish as a means to negotiate the terms of the surrender of a German unit consisting of 78 men. He became a corporal.

After completing his military service, he was a law clerk for Supreme Court Associate Justice Felix Frankfurter. The justices would hold their weekly conference on Saturdays, and Henkin would sleep on Frankfurter's couch on Friday nights and in order to avoid the performance of activities prohibited on Shabbat would refrain from writing while at the conference. In a 2003 interview, Henkin said that he "did my job as well as I could, observing Shabbat as well as I could," and said that he did not know if Frankfurter—who was not Shomer Shabbat—was ever aware that Henkin had been sleeping on his couch.

Beginning in 1948, Henkin worked at the United Nations bureau of the United States Department of State, where he was one of the individuals responsible for the Convention Relating to the Status of Refugees in 1951, an agreement that established the internationally agreed upon definition of what constitutes a refugee and established the requirements for countries to provide asylum to individuals so designated. He left the State department in 1956 to teach for a year at Columbia University on the subject of nuclear disarmament which became the subject matter for his 1958 book Arms Control and Inspection in American Law. He taught at the University of Pennsylvania starting in 1958, continuing his work that was published as The Berlin Crisis and the United Nations in 1959 and the book Disarmament: The Lawyer's Interests, which was released in 1964.

While teaching at Columbia Law School starting in the early 1960s and through the Justice and Society Program of the Aspen Institute, Henkin specialized in the development and instruction of human rights law, which he put into practice by establishing the university's Center for the Study of Human Rights in 1978 and creating the Human Rights Institute in 1998. Elisa Massimino, president and chief executive officer of Human Rights First, the nonpartisan organization originally formed by Henkin as the Lawyers Committee for Human Rights, said that he "literally and figuratively wrote the book on human rights" and that "[i]t is no exaggeration to say that no American was more instrumental in the development of human rights law than Lou".

Written while Richard Nixon was conducting the American involvement in the Vietnam War, his 1972 book Foreign Affairs and the Constitution described the division of responsibility between the president of the United States and the Congress in conducting foreign affairs and military action, exploring how the executive branch had achieved a great measure of control despite the fact that the Constitution grants the legislative branch the power to declare war. As the practice of foreign affairs had become more complex, he detailed how Congress had gradually acceded to the president greater control in conducting American foreign relations and showed that it had not taken adequate precautions in the way these powers were wielded by the executive. In his 1990 work Constitutionalism, Democracy and Foreign Affairs Henkin reiterated his concerns about the growth of the Imperial Presidency and its effect on the way the nation's foreign affairs were conducted, emphasizing that the preservation of human rights must play an important role. This and other books such as The Rights of Man Today, How Nations Behave, and Age of Rights, comprised a collection of works that The New York Times described in his obituary as being "required reading for government officials and diplomats". He was the chief reporter of the influential Restatement (Third) of the Foreign Relations Law of the United States.

Henkin died at age 92 on October 14, 2010, at his home in Manhattan after a long illness with Alzheimer's disease. He was married to Alice Hartman Henkin and they had three sons—his eldest, Joshua Henkin, is a novelist; his second son, David Henkin, is a professor of American history at the University of California, Berkeley; and his youngest son, Daniel Henkin, is the director of music at the Ramaz School—and five grandchildren.

== See also ==
- List of law clerks for the second seat of the Supreme Court of the United States
