= Fyodor Gakhov =

Soviet mathematician

Fyodor Dmitriyevich Gakhov
- Born: 19 February 1906; Cherkessk, Russian Empire
- Died: 30 March 1980; Minsk, BSSR, Soviet Union
- Occupation: Mathematician
- Scientific career
- Doctoral students: Stefan Grigorievich Samko

Fyodor Dmitriyevich Gakhov (Russian: Фёдор Дмитриевич Гахов; 19 February 1906, Cherkessk — 30 March 1980, Minsk) was a Soviet and Russian mathematician and a specialist in the field of boundary value problems for analytic functions of a complex variable.

== Biography ==
Fyodor Dmitriyevich Gakhov was born on 19 February 19 1906 in Batalpashinskaya village (present-day Cherkessk, Stavropol Krai) in the family of a shoemaker. His father died when he was a boy. After graduating from the Circassian Pedagogical College in 1925, he entered Gorsky Pedagogical Institute in Vladikavkaz.

In 1928, on the recommendation of Professor L. I. Kreer, he was admitted to Kazan Federal University, which he graduated in 1930.

In 1934—1937 Fyodor Gakhov taught mathematics at the universities of Sverdlovsk, and alter enrolled in the graduate school of Kazan University, where his scientific guide was Boris Gagaev. He decided to specialize on the solution of boundary value problems in the theory of analytic functions and the corresponding integral integral equations.

In 1937 Gakhov defended his Candidate of Sciences thesis "Linear boundary value problems in the theory of analytic functions". This work was awarded the second prize at the All-Union competition of works of young scientists. From 1937 to 1939 he worked as an assistant professor at the Kazan University, and from 1939 to 1947 he was the head of the Department of Mathematical Analysis of the North Ossetian Pedagogical Institute.

In 1943 he defended his Doctor of Sciences thesis "Boundary value problems in the theory of analytic functions and singular integral equations". In 1943 he became a professor.

In 1947—1953 years Gakhov worked as a professor, and later as head of the Department of Differential Equations of Kazan University. In 1953—1961 he headed the Department of Differential Equations of Rostov State University.

From 1961 until his death Gakhov worked at Belarusian State University. There he headed the Department of Mathematical Analysis, then the Department of Theory of Functions and Functional Analysis, and later worked as a professor in the Department of Theory of Functions. In 1962—1963 years he was Dean of the Faculty of Mathematics. In 1966 Gakhov was elected a full member of the Academy of Sciences of the Byelorussian SSR.

Fyodor Gakhov died on 30 March 1980 and was buried at the Northern Cemetery of Minsk.

He was the author of the famous monograph "Boundary Problems", where he presented the results on solution of Riemann-Hilbert problem, which he studied together with a group of students. This work has been translated to English and Spanish.
