= Canada at the 2009 World Championships in Athletics =

- WA code: CAN
- National federation: Athletics Canada
- Website: www.athletics.ca

in Berlin
- Competitors: 31
- Medals: Gold 0 Silver 1 Bronze 0 Total 1

World Championships in Athletics appearances (overview)
- 1976; 1980; 1983; 1987; 1991; 1993; 1995; 1997; 1999; 2001; 2003; 2005; 2007; 2009; 2011; 2013; 2015; 2017; 2019; 2022; 2023; 2025

Canada competed at the 2009 World Championships in Athletics from 15 to 23 August. A team of 31 athletes was announced in preparation for the competition. Selected athletes have achieved one of the competition's qualifying standards. The team includes the 2007 World Championships silver medallists Perdita Felicien and Gary Reed.

There are few notable absences on this year's team, including Tyler Christopher, a former world bronze medallist in the 400 metres (hamstring injury), veteran middle-distance runner Kevin Sullivan, who has been on every world championship team since 1993 (torn Achilles tendon) and heptathlete Jessica Zelinka, fifth at the 2008 Beijing Olympics, who is sitting out the season after giving birth to her first child.

== Team selection ==
Track and road events

Event	Athletes	
Event	Men	Women
100 metres	Bryan Barnett	
200 metres	Jared Connaughton; Sam Effah; Gavin Smellie	Adrienne Power
400 metres		Esther Akinsulie
800 metres	Gary Reed	
1500 metres	Nathan Brannen	
Marathon	Reid Coolsaet; Giitah Macharia; Andrew Smith; Dylan Wykes	Tara Quinn-Smith
100 metres hurdles	—	Perdita Felicien; Priscilla Lopes-Schliep; Angela Whyte
3000 m steeplechase	Robin Watson	
20 km race walk		Rachel Lavallée
4×100 metres relay	Bryan Barnett; Jared Connaughton; Sam Effah; Hank Palmer; Gavin Smellie; Oluseyi Smith	
4×400 metres relay		Esther Akinsulie; Kimberly Hyacinthe; Jenna Martin; Carline Muir; Amonn Nelson; Adrienne Power

Field and combined events

Event	Athletes	
Event	Men	Women
Pole vault		Kelsie Hendry
Long jump		Ruky Abdulai; Alice Falaiye
Shot put	Dylan Armstrong	
Hammer throw		Sultana Frizell; Jennifer Joyce
Heptathlon	—	Brianne Theisen

== Results ==
=== Men ===
Track and road events

Event	Athletes	Heat Round 1		Heat Round 2		Semifinal		Final	
Event	Athletes	Result	Rank	Result	Rank	Result	Rank	Result	Rank
100 m	Bryan Barnett	10.42	44th	–					
200 m	Jared Connaughton	20.82	18th	DQ	–				
200 m	Gavin Smellie	20.71	9th	21.27	28th	–			
200 m	Sam Effah	20.80	14th	20.97	26th	–			
400 m	–								
800 m	Gary Reed	1:45.76	1st	1:45.60	8th	–			
1,500 m	Nathan Brannen	3.38.35	7th	3:38.97	20th	–			
5,000 m	–								
10,000 m	–								
110 m hurdles	–								
400 m hurdles	–								
3000 m steeplechase	Robin Watson	8.44.73	31st	–					
4 × 100 m relay	Hank Palmer, Oluseyi Smith, Jared Connaughton, Bryan Barnett	38.60	6th					38.39	5th
4 × 400 m relay									
Marathon									
20 km walk									
50 km walk									
200 metres T11									

Field events

Event	Athletes	Qualification		Final	
Event	Athletes	Result	Rank	Result	Rank
Long jump					
Triple jump					
High jump					
Pole vault					
Shot put	Dylan Armstrong	19.86 (19.46–19.86-X=19.86)	17 (DNQ)	////	////
Discus throw					
Javelin throw					
Hammer throw					
Decathlon					

=== Women ===
Track and road events

Event	Athletes	Heat Round 1		Heat Round 2		Semifinal		Final	
Event	Athletes	Result	Rank	Result	Rank	Result	Rank	Result	Rank
100 m									
200 m									
400 m									
800 m									
1,500 m									
5,000 m									
10,000 m									
100 m hurdles									
400 m hurdles									
3000 m steeplechase									
4 × 100 m relay									
4 × 400 m relay									
Marathon									
20 km walk	Rachel Lavallée							1.45.35	35
200 metres T11									

Field and combined events

Event	Athletes	Qualification		Final	
Event	Athletes	Result	Rank	Result	Rank
Long jump					
Triple jump					
High jump					
Pole vault	Kelsie Hendry	4.40 (o-o-xxx)	16 (DNQ)	////	////
Shot put					
Discus throw					
Javelin throw					
Hammer throw					
Heptathlon					
