= 2009 World Marathon Cup =

World Marathon Cup in Berlin

The 2009 World Marathon Cup was the 13th edition of the World Marathon Cup of athletics and were held in Berlin, Germany, inside of the 2009 World Championships.

The Russian women's team fell from the third to the fifth place, after Nailiya Yulamanova (eighth place; 2:27:08 h) had been disqualified because of doping. The Russian men's team (seventh place) dropped out of the rankings after the disqualification of Mikhail Lemaev (45th place; 2:21:47 h).

== Results ==
Team men
Rank	Nation	Time
1st place, gold medalist(s)	Kenya; Abel Kirui (1st); Emmanuel Kipchirchir Mutai (2nd); Robert Kipkoech Cheruiyot (5th)	6:25:28; 2:06:54; 2:07:48; 2:10:46
2nd place, silver medalist(s)	Ethiopia; Tsegay Kebede (3rd); Yemane Tsegay (4th); Dejene Yirdaw (15th)	6:32:06; 2:08:35; 2:08:42; 2:15:09
3rd place, bronze medalist(s)	Japan; Atsushi Sato (6th); Masaya Shimizu (11th); Satoshi Irifune (14th)	6:41:05; 2:12:05; 2:14:06; 2:14:54
4	Portugal; José Moreira (9th); Luís Feiteira (10th); Fernando Silva (13th)	6:42:59; 2:14:05; 2:14:06; 2:14:48
5	South Africa; Norman Dlomo (12th); Johannes Kekana (17th); Coolboy Ngamole (22nd)	6:46:27; 2:14:39; 2:15:28; 2:16:20
6	Brazil; Marilson dos Santos (16th); Adriano Bastos (19th); José de Souza (23rd)	6:47:32; 2:15:13; 2:15:39; 2:16:40
7	Australia; Martin Dent (21st); Andrew Letherby (30th); Mark Tucker (46th)	6:55:31; 2:16:05; 2:17:29; 2:21:57
8	Germany; André Pollmächer (18th); Martin Beckmann (34th); Falk Cierpinski (49th)	6:56:20; 2:15:36; 2:18:08; 2:22:36
9	France; Simon Munyutu (32nd); James Kibocha Theuri (41st); Driss El Himer (44th)	6:59:36; 2:17:53; 2:20:24; 2:21:19
10	Canada; Reid Coolsaet (25th); Dylan Wykes (33rd); Andrew Smith (52nd)	6:59:41; 2:16:53; 2:18:00; 2:24:48
11	Mexico; Alejandro Suárez (37th); Carlos Cordero (48th); Juan Gualberto Vargas (54th)	7:06:37; 2:18:55; 2:22:16; 2:25:26
12	United States; Daniel Browne (24th); Matt Gabrielson (36th); Nate Jenkins (62nd)	7:07:46; 2:16:49; 2:18:41; 2:32:16
13	Tanzania; Phaustin Baha Sulle (28th); Getuli Bayo (56th); Andrea Silvini (59th)	7:11:51; 2:17:11; 2:25:52; 2:28:48
14	South Korea; Lee Myong-Seung (45th); Lee Myong-Ki (64th); Yook Geun-Tae (68th)	7:37:53; 2:21:54; 2:35:12; 2:40:47

Team women
Rank	Nation	Time
1st place, gold medalist(s)	China; Bai Xue (1st); Zhou Chunxiu (4th); Zhu Xiaolin (5th)	7:17:02; 2:25:15; 2:25:39; 2:26:08
2nd place, silver medalist(s)	Japan; Yoshimi Ozaki (2nd); Yuri Kano (7th); Yoshiko Fujinaga (13th)	7:22:15; 2:25:25; 2:26:57; 2:29:53
3rd place, bronze medalist(s)	Ethiopia; Aselefech Mergia (3rd); Bezunesh Bekele (15th); Dire Tune (22nd)	7:24:42; 2:25:32; 2:30:03; 2:32:42
4	United States; Kara Goucher (9th); Desireé Davila (10th); Tera Moody (27th)	7:32:20; 2:27:48; 2:27:53; 2:36:39
5	Russia; Alevtina Biktimirova (8th); Svetlana Zakharova (14th); Olga Glok (28th)	7:34:31; 2:27:39; 2:29:55; 2:36:57
6	Kenya; Julia Mumbi Muraga (11th); Irene Limika (20th); Risper Jemeli Kimaiyo (36th)	7:39:51; 2:28:59; 2:31:29; 2:39:23
7	North Korea; Kim Kum-Ok (19th); Jong Yong-Ok (32nd); Phyo Un-Suk (41st)	7:50:32; 2:31:24; 2:38:29; 2:40:39
8	New Zealand; Mary Davies (34th); Fiona Docherty (40th); Shireen Crumpton (43rd)	8:00:37; 2:38:48; 2:40:18; 2:41:31
9	France; Patricia Lossouarn (48th); Laurence Klein (49th); Stephanie Briand (53rd)	8:13:43; 2:42:40; 2:42:47; 2:48:16

Individual men
Rank	Athlete	Nationality	Time
1st place, gold medalist(s)	Abel Kirui	Kenya	2:06:54
2nd place, silver medalist(s)	Emmanuel Kipchirchir Mutai	Kenya	2:07:48
3rd place, bronze medalist(s)	Tsegaye Kebede	Ethiopia	2:08:35
4	Yemane Tsegay	Ethiopia	2:08:42
5	Robert Kipkoech Cheruiyot	Kenya	2:10:46
6	Atsushi Sato	Japan	2:12:05
7	Adil Ennani	Morocco	2:12:12
8	José Manuel Martínez	Spain	2:14:04

Individual women
Rank	Athlete	Nationality	Time
1st place, gold medalist(s)	Bai Xue	China	2:25:15
2nd place, silver medalist(s)	Yoshimi Ozaki	Japan	2:25:25
3rd place, bronze medalist(s)	Aselefech Mergia	Ethiopia	2:25:32
4	Zhou Chunxiu	China	2:25:39
5	Zhu Xiaolin	China	2:26:08
6	Marisa Barros	Portugal	2:26:50
7	Yuri Kano	Japan	2:26:57
8	Alevtina Biktimirova	Russia	2:27:39

== See also ==
- 2009 World Championships in Athletics – Men's Marathon
- 2009 World Championships in Athletics – Women's Marathon
