= Great Britain and Northern Ireland at the 2009 World Championships in Athletics =

- WA code: GBR
- National federation: UK Athletics
- Website: uka.org.uk

in Berlin
- Competitors: 60
- Medals Ranked 7th: Gold 2 Silver 2 Bronze 3 Total 7

World Championships in Athletics appearances (overview)
- 1976; 1980; 1983; 1987; 1991; 1993; 1995; 1997; 1999; 2001; 2003; 2005; 2007; 2009; 2011; 2013; 2015; 2017; 2019; 2022; 2023; 2025

Great Britain and Northern Ireland (often referred to as Great Britain) is competing at the 2009 World Championships in Athletics from 15–23 August. UK Athletics announced a team of 60 athletes in July in preparation for the competition, although it was known that some athletes might not compete due to injury. Christine Ohuruogu entered the competition as the defending 400 metres champion. Selected athletes had achieved one of the competition's qualifying standards.

Ohuruogu, Jessica Ennis, and Phillips Idowu were identified as the athletes with the greatest chance of winning a gold medal; two of them succeeded. The team included the defending 400m gold and silver medallists, Ohuruogu and Nicola Sanders, respectively. Paula Radcliffe, the Marathon gold medallist in 2005, was the other individual medallist returning to the GBR team. Head coach Charles van Commenee stated that matching the last championships medal haul (5) was a reasonable target given a number of high-profile injuries.

Germaine Mason and Toby Sandeman withdrew from the squad due to injuries before the start of the competition.

== Team selection ==
Track and road events

Event	Athletes	
Event	Men	Women
100 metres	Dwain Chambers; Tyrone Edgar; Simeon Williamson	
200 metres	Dwain Chambers; Marlon Devonish; ~~Toby Sandeman~~ (Note: Sandeman withdrew due to lack of fitness, after missing several training sessions prior to the Championships due to injury.)	Emily Freeman
400 metres	Michael Bingham; Martyn Rooney; Robert Tobin	Christine Ohuruogu; Nicola Sanders
800 metres	Michael Rimmer	Jenny Meadows; Marilyn Okoro; Jemma Simpson
1500 metres	Andrew Baddeley; Thomas Lancashire; James Brewer	Lisa Dobriskey; Charlene Thomas; Stephanie Twell
5000 metres	Mo Farah	
Marathon		~~Paula Radcliffe~~
100 metres hurdles	—	Sarah Claxton; Jessica Ennis
110 metres hurdles	Gianni Frankis; Andy Turner; William Sharman	—
400 metres hurdles	Dai Greene; Rhys Williams	Eilidh Child; Perri Shakes-Drayton
3000 m steeplechase		Helen Clitheroe
20 km race walk		Joanna Jackson
4×100 metres relay	Harry Aikines-Aryeetey; Marlon Devonish; Tyrone Edgar; Rikki Fifton; Craig Pickering; Simeon Williamson	Emma Ania; Montell Douglas; Jeanette Kwakye; Joice Maduaka; Anyika Onuora; Laura Turner
4×400 metres relay	Michael Bingham; Chris Clarke; Nigel Levine; Martyn Rooney; Robert Tobin; Conrad Williams	Vicki Barr; Lee McConnell; Christine Ohuruogu; Marilyn Okoro; Nicola Sanders; Perri Shakes-Drayton

Field and combined events

Event	Athletes	
Event	Men	Women
Pole vault	Luke Cutts; Steve Lewis	Kate Dennison
High jump	~~Germaine Mason~~ (Note: Mason withdrew due to an ankle injury, that was picked up in Stockholm prior to the games.)	
Long jump	Greg Rutherford; Chris Tomlinson	
Triple jump	Larry Achike; Nathan Douglas; Phillips Idowu	
Shot put	Carl Myerscough	
Hammer throw		Zoe Derham
Javelin throw	Mervyn Luckwell	Goldie Sayers
Heptathlon	—	Jessica Ennis; Louise Hazel

== Results ==
=== Men ===
Track and field events

Event	Athletes	Heat Round 1		Heat Round 2		Semi-final		Final	
Event	Athletes	Result	Rank	Result	Rank	Result	Rank	Result	Rank
100 m	Dwain Chambers	10.18	1	10.04	1	10.04	4	10.00	6
100 m	Tyrone Edgar	10.42	2	10.12	2	DQ	-	did not advance	
100 m	Simeon Williamson	10.31	2	10.23	5	did not advance			
200 m	Dwain Chambers	DNS		did not advance					
200 m	Marlon Devonish	20.92	1	20.66	2	20.62	7	did not advance	
400 m	Martyn Rooney	45.45	3	-		45.98	7	did not advance	
400 m	Robert Tobin	45.50	1	-		45.90	7	did not advance	
400 m	Michael Bingham	45.54	2	-		44.74	2	45.56	7
800 m	Michael Rimmer	1:48.20	3	-		1:46.77	7	did not advance	
1500 m	Thomas Lancashire	3:42.68	8	-		did not advance			
1500 m	Andrew Baddeley	3:45.23	4	-		3:38.23	11	did not advance	
1500 m	James Brewer	3:37.17	3	-		3:37.27	6	did not advance	
5000 m	Mo Farah	13:19.94	3	-				13:19.69	7
110 m Hurdles	Andy Turner	13.73	5	-		did not advance			
110 m Hurdles	William Sharman	13.52	3	-		13.38	1	13.30	4
110 m Hurdles	Gianni Frankis	13.83	7	-		did not advance			
400 m Hurdles	Dai Greene	48.76	1	-		48.27	2	48.68	7
400 m Hurdles	Rhys Williams	49.88	5	-		did not advance			
Pole Vault	Luke Cutts	5.40m	13	-				did not advance	
Pole Vault	Steven Lewis	5.65m	3	-				5.65m	7
Long Jump	Greg Rutherford	8.30m	1	-				8.17m	5
Long Jump	Chris Tomlinson	8.06m	3	-				8.06m	8
Triple Jump	Larry Achike	16.94m	8	-				did not advance	
Triple Jump	Phillips Idowu	17.32m	2	-				17.73m	Gold medal
Triple Jump	Nathan Douglas	17.00m	6	-				16.79m	10
Shot Put	Carl Myerscough	20.17m	10	-				18.42m	11
Javelin	Mervyn Luckwell	66.30m	21	-				did not advance	
4 × 100 m Relay	Simeon Williamson; Tyrone Edgar; Marlon Devonish; Harry Aikines-Aryeetey	38.11	2	-				38.02	Bronze medal
4 × 400 m Relay	Conrad Williams; Robert Tobin; Dai Greene; Martyn Rooney	3:01.91	3	Conrad Williams; Michael Bingham; Robert Tobin; Martyn Rooney				3:00.53	Silver medal

=== Women ===
Track, field and road events

Event	Athletes	Heat Round 1		Semi-final		Final	
Event	Athletes	Result	Rank	Result	Rank	Result	Rank
200 m	Emily Freeman	23.10	2	22.64	3	22.98	7
400 m	Christine Ohuruogu	51.30	2	50.35	2	50.21	5
400 m	Nicola Sanders	51.64	2	50.45	4	did not advance	
800 m	Marilyn Okoro	2:03.07	3	2:01.01	2	2:00.32	8
800 m	Jenny Meadows	2:02.47	2	1:59.45	2	1:57.93	Bronze medal
800 m	Jemma Simpson	2:03.33	2	2:00.57	5	did not advance	
1500 m	Stephanie Twell	4:18.23	12	did not advance			
1500 m	Charlene Thomas	4:09.91	9	did not advance			
1500 m	Lisa Dobriskey	4:07.90	4	4:03.86	4	4:03.75	Silver medal
Marathon	Paula Radcliffe	N/A				DNS	
100 m Hurdles	Sarah Claxton	12.86	4	13.21	8	did not advance	
100 m Hurdles	Jessica Ennis	DNS					
400 m Hurdles	Eilidh Child	55.96	3	56.21	6	did not advance	
400 m Hurdles	Perri Shakes-Drayton	56.49	3	57.57	7	did not advance	
3000 m Steeplechase	Helen Clitheroe	9:41.71	9	N/A		did not advance	
20 km Walk	Johanna Jackson	N/A				DQ	
Pole Vault	Kate Dennison	4.55m	4	N/A		4.55	6
Hammer	Zoe Derham	NM		N/A		did not advance	
Javelin	Goldie Sayers	58.98m	9	did not advance			
Heptathlon	Louise Hazel	N/A				6,008	14
Heptathlon	Jessica Ennis	N/A				6,731	Gold medal
4 × 100 m Relay	Laura Turner; Montell Douglas; Emily Freeman; Emma Ania	43.34	3	N/A		43.16	6
4 × 400 m Relay	Nicola Sanders; Vicki Barr; Jennifer Meadows; Lee McConnell	3:25.23	4	Lee McConnell; Christine Ohuruogu; Vicki Barr; Nicola Sanders		3:25.16	Bronze medal
