= 2009 World Championships in Athletics – Women's 5000 metres =

The women's 5000 metres at the 2009 World Championships in Athletics were held at the Olympic Stadium on 19 and 22 August

== Medalists ==
Gold	Silver	Bronze
Vivian Cheruiyot; Kenya	Sylvia Jebiwott Kibet; Kenya	Meseret Defar; Ethiopia

== Records ==
World record	Tirunesh Dibaba (ETH)	14:11.15	Oslo, Norway	6 June 2008
Championship record	Tirunesh Dibaba (ETH)	14:38.59	Helsinki, Finland	13 August 2005
World leading	Tirunesh Dibaba (ETH)	14:33.65	London, Great Britain	25 July 2009
African record	Tirunesh Dibaba (ETH)	14:11.15	Oslo, Norway	6 June 2008
Asian record	Jiang Bo (CHN)	14:28.09	Shanghai, China	23 October 1997
North American record	Shalane Flanagan (USA)	14:44.80	Walnut, United States	13 April 2007
South American record	Carmem de Oliveira (BRA)	15:22.01	Hechtel-Eksel, Belgium	31 July 1993
European record	Liliya Shobukhova (RUS)	14:23.75	Kazan, Russia	19 July 2008
Oceanian record	Kim Smith (NZL)	14:45.93	Rome, Italy	11 July 2008

== Qualification standards ==
A time	B time
15:10.00	15:25.00

== Schedule ==
Date	Time	Round
August 19, 2009	10:45	Heats
August 22, 2009	19:35	Final

== Results ==
=== Heats ===
Qualification: First 5 in each heat(Q) and the next 5 fastest(q) advance to the final.

Rank	Heat	Name	Nationality	Time	Notes
1	2	Meseret Defar	Ethiopia	15:16.46	Q
2	2	Vivian Cheruiyot	Kenya	15:16.59	Q
3	1	Sentayehu Ejigu	Ethiopia	15:17.64	Q
4	1	Sylvia Jebiwott Kibet	Kenya	15:17.77	Q
5	1	Meselech Melkamu	Ethiopia	15:18.39	Q
6	2	Iness Chepkesis Chenonge	Kenya	15:18.40	Q
7	2	Genzebe Dibaba	Ethiopia	15:19.66	Q
8	2	Alemitu Bekele	Turkey	15:19.88	Q, SB
9	1	Krisztina Papp	Hungary	15:19.90	Q, SB
10	1	Sara Moreira	Portugal	15:19.93	Q
11	2	Jennifer Rhines	United States	15:20.20	q
12	2	Silvia Weissteiner	Italy	15:20.88	q
13	1	Yurika Nakamura	Japan	15:21.01	q, PB
14	2	Yuriko Kobayashi	Japan	15:23.96	q, SB
15	2	Zakia Mrisho Mohamed	Tanzania	15:25.09	q, SB
16	1	Julie Culley	United States	15:32.33	
17	1	Natalya Popkova	Russia	15:32.62	
18	2	Elizaveta Grechishnikova	Russia	15:53.41	
19	2	Judith Pla	Spain	15:54.32	
20	1	Inés Melchor	Peru	16:00.83	
21	2	Pauline Niyongere	Burundi	16:33.77	PB
22	1	Marriam Thole	Malawi	17:12.21	
	1	Elvan Abeylegesse	Turkey	DNS	

Key: PB = Personal best, SB = Seasonal best

== Final ==
Rank	Name	Nationality	Time	Notes
1st place, gold medalist(s)	Vivian Cheruiyot	Kenya	14:57.97	
2nd place, silver medalist(s)	Sylvia Jebiwott Kibet	Kenya	14:58.33	
3rd place, bronze medalist(s)	Meseret Defar	Ethiopia	14:58.41	
4	Sentayehu Ejigu	Ethiopia	15:03.38	
5	Meselech Melkamu	Ethiopia	15:03.72	
6	Iness Chepkesis Chenonge	Kenya	15:06.06	
7	Silvia Weissteiner	Italy	15:09.74	SB
8	Genzebe Dibaba	Ethiopia	15:11.12	
9	Jennifer Rhines	United States	15:11.63	
10	Sara Moreira	Portugal	15:12.22	
11	Yuriko Kobayashi	Japan	15:12.44	SB
12	Yurika Nakamura	Japan	15:13.01	PB
13	Alemitu Bekele	Turkey	15:18.18	SB
14	Krisztina Papp	Hungary	15:20.36	
15	Zakia Mrisho Mohamed	Tanzania	15:31.73	

Key: CR = Championship record, DNF = Did not finish, DNS = Did not start, PB = Personal best, SB = Seasonal best

=== Splits ===
Intermediate	Athlete	Country	Mark
1000m	Yurika Nakamura	Japan	3:06.02
2000m	Sentayehu Ejigu	Ethiopia	6:11.04
3000m	Vivian Cheruiyot	Kenya	9:15.05
4000m	Vivian Cheruiyot	Kenya	12:15.79
