= 2009 World Championships in Athletics – Men's 1500 metres =

The men's 1500 metres at the 2009 World Championships in Athletics was held at the Olympic Stadium between 15–19 August. The winning margin was 0.08 seconds, which was the narrowest winning margin in the history of this event until the 2025 edition. Among the favoured athletes in the event were defending champion Bernard Lagat, European champion Mehdi Baala, and the Kenyan season leaders Asbel Kiprop, Haron Keitany and Augustine Choge.

All the favoured athletes progressed through a series of tactically-run heats on the first day of competition, with Baala, Kiprop, Choge and Deresse Mekonnen the four race winners. Moroccan Amine Laalou won the first semi-final, followed by Americans Lopez Lomong and Lagat, while Kiprop and Leonel Manzano both finished quickly to take the top two qualifying spots in the second race. The only high-profile athlete to be eliminated in the semi-finals was Keitany, who did not start, putting an end to any hopes of a Kenyan medal sweep.

The final race began slowly and, as the athletes reached the last lap, they remained in a tight pack led by Mekonnen. Choge and Mohamed Moustaoui closely followed as he approached the final straight, but the race remained open. Yusuf Saad Kamel took the lead in the final straight, scoring a surprise gold medal. Mekonnen maintained his pace to take the silver medal and defending champion Lagat had a quick burst near the finish to win the bronze. Kiprop, one of the pre-race favourites, left himself too much ground to cover, eventually ending up fourth, with Choge and Baala alongside him.

Bahrain's Kamel, born in Kenya as Gregory Konchellah, followed in the footsteps of his father Billy Konchellah, who won the 800 m at the 1987 and 1991 World Championships. Mekonnen's silver was Ethiopia's first ever World Championship medal in the 1500 m. Lagat's bronze was his third in the 1500 m, after his silver in 2001 and a gold in 2007.

== Medalists ==
| Gold | Silver | Bronze |
|---|---|---|
| Yusuf Saad Kamel; Bahrain | Deresse Mekonnen; Ethiopia | Bernard Lagat; United States |

== Records ==
| World record | Hicham El Guerrouj (MAR) | 3:26.00 | Rome, Italy | 14 July 1998 |
| Championship record | Hicham El Guerrouj (MAR) | 3:27.65 | Seville, Spain | 14 August 1999 |
| World Leading | Augustine Choge (KEN) | 3:29.47 | Berlin, Germany | 14 June 2009 |
| African record | Hicham El Guerrouj (MAR) | 3:26.00 | Rome, Italy | 14 July 1998 |
| Asian record | Rashid Ramzi (BHR) | 3:29.14 | Rome, Italy | 14 July 2006 |
| North American record | Bernard Lagat (USA) | 3:29.30 | Rieti, Italy | 28 August 2005 |
| South American record | Hudson de Souza (BRA) | 3:33.25 | Rieti, Italy | 28 August 2005 |
| European record | Fermín Cacho (ESP) | 3:28.95 | Zürich, Switzerland | 13 August 1997 |
| Oceanian record | Simon Doyle (AUS) | 3:31.96 | Stockholm, Sweden | 3 July 1991 |

== Qualification standards ==
| A time | B time |
|---|---|
| 3:36.20 | 3:39.30 |

== Schedule ==
| Date | Time | Round |
|---|---|---|
| August 15, 2009 | 18:15 | Heats |
| August 17, 2009 | 20:10 | Semifinals |
| August 19, 2009 | 20:25 | Final |

== Results ==
=== Heats ===
Qualification: First 5 in each heat(Q) and the next 4 fastest(q) advance to the semifinal.

| Rank | Heat | Name | Nationality | Time | Notes |
|---|---|---|---|---|---|
| 1 | 4 | Deresse Mekonnen | Ethiopia | 3:37.04 | Q |
| 2 | 4 | Haron Keitany | Kenya | 3:37.13 | Q |
| 3 | 4 | James Brewer | Great Britain & N.I. | 3:37.17 | Q, PB |
| 4 | 4 | Mohamed Moustaoui | Morocco | 3:37.34 | Q |
| 5 | 4 | Yusuf Saad Kamel | Bahrain | 3:37.59 | Q |
| 6 | 4 | Reyes Estévez | Spain | 3:38.23 | q, SB |
| 7 | 4 | Nathan Brannen | Canada | 3:38.35 | q |
| 8 | 4 | Dorian Ulrey | United States | 3:38.86 | q |
| 9 | 4 | Taoufik Makhloufi | Algeria | 3:40.04 | q |
| 10 | 4 | Stefan Eberhardt | Germany | 3:40.05 | |
| 11 | 2 | Asbel Kiprop | Kenya | 3:41.42 | Q |
| 12 | 2 | Bernard Lagat | United States | 3:41.60 | Q |
| 13 | 2 | Juan Carlos Higuero | Spain | 3:41.77 | Q |
| 14 | 2 | Rui Silva | Portugal | 3:41.98 | Q |
| 15 | 4 | Mounir Yemmouni | France | 3:42.06 | |
| 16 | 2 | Peter van der Westhuizen | South Africa | 3:42.33 | Q |
| 17 | 2 | Antar Zerguelaïne | Algeria | 3:42.37 | |
| 18 | 2 | Thomas Chamney | Ireland | 3:42.54 | |
| 19 | 2 | Thomas Lancashire | Great Britain & N.I. | 3:42.68 | |
| 20 | 1 | Mehdi Baala | France | 3:42.77 | Q |
| 21 | 1 | Leonel Manzano | United States | 3:42.87 | Q |
| 22 | 1 | Abdalaati Iguider | Morocco | 3:42.88 | Q |
| 23 | 1 | Jeffrey Riseley | Australia | 3:43.03 | Q |
| 24 | 1 | Belal Mansoor Ali | Bahrain | 3:43.06 | Q |
| 25 | 1 | Arturo Casado | Spain | 3:43.21 | |
| 26 | 1 | Mekonnen Gebremedhin | Ethiopia | 3:43.22 | |
| 27 | 1 | Christian Obrist | Italy | 3:43.41 | |
| 28 | 4 | Tiidrek Nurme | Estonia | 3:43.73 | SB |
| 29 | 1 | Hais Welday | Eritrea | 3:43.84 | |
| 30 | 2 | Carsten Schlangen | Germany | 3:44.00 | |
| 31 | 1 | Goran Nava | Serbia | 3:44.13 | |
| 32 | 3 | Augustine Kiprono Choge | Kenya | 3:44.73 | Q |
| 33 | 3 | Amine Laâlou | Morocco | 3:44.75 | Q |
| 34 | 2 | Ryan Gregson | Australia | 3:44.79 | |
| 35 | 3 | Lopez Lomong | United States | 3:44.89 | Q |
| 36 | 3 | Andrew Baddeley | Great Britain & N.I. | 3:45.23 | Q |
| 37 | 3 | Henok Legesse | Ethiopia | 3:45.63 | Q |
| 38 | 3 | Tarek Boukensa | Algeria | 3:45.65 | |
| 39 | 3 | Kristof van Malderen | Belgium | 3:46.03 | |
| 40 | 3 | Yoann Kowal | France | 3:46.42 | |
| 41 | 3 | Johan Cronje | South Africa | 3:46.45 | |
| 42 | 3 | Jeremy Roff | Australia | 3:47.08 | |
| 43 | 2 | Abdalla Abdelgadir | Sudan | 3:47.78 | |
| 44 | 1 | Mohammed Othman Shaween | Saudi Arabia | 3:49.03 | |
| 45 | 2 | Byron Piedra | Ecuador | 3:49.60 | |
| 46 | 3 | Mohamad Al-Garni | Qatar | 3:50.55 | |
| 47 | 1 | Chauncy Master | Malawi | 3:50.73 | |
| 48 | 3 | Álvaro Vásquez | Nicaragua | 3:55.06 | PB |
| 49 | 4 | Víctor Martínez | Andorra | 4:02.10 | SB |
| 50 | 2 | Hem Bunting | Cambodia | 4:08.64 | SB |
| 51 | 1 | Abdallahi Nanou | Mauritania | 4:09.77 | PB |
| 52 | 2 | Benjamín Enzema | Equatorial Guinea | 4:13.17 | PB |
| 53 | 3 | Antoine Berlin | Monaco | 4:27.52 | |
| | 1 | Boampouguini Djigban | Togo | DNF | |

Key: PB = Personal best, Q = qualification by place in heat, q = qualification by overall place, SB = Seasonal best

=== Semifinals ===
Qualification: First 5 in each semifinal(Q) and the next 2 fastest(q) advance to the final.

| Rank | Heat | Name | Nationality | Time | Notes |
|---|---|---|---|---|---|
| 1 | 2 | Asbel Kiprop | Kenya | 3:36.24 | Q |
| 2 | 2 | Leonel Manzano | United States | 3:36.29 | Q |
| 3 | 2 | Augustine Kiprono Choge | Kenya | 3:36.43 | Q |
| 4 | 1 | Amine Laâlou | Morocco | 3:36.68 | Q |
| 5 | 1 | Lopez Lomong | United States | 3:36.75 | Q |
| 6 | 1 | Bernard Lagat | United States | 3:36.86 | Q |
| 6 | 2 | Deresse Mekonnen | Ethiopia | 3:36.86 | Q |
| 8 | 1 | Yusuf Saad Kamel | Bahrain | 3:36.87 | Q |
| 8 | 2 | Belal Mansoor Ali | Bahrain | 3:36.87 | Q |
| 10 | 2 | Mohamed Moustaoui | Morocco | 3:36.94 | q |
| 11 | 1 | Mehdi Baala | France | 3:37.07 | Q |
| 12 | 2 | Abdalaati Iguider | Morocco | 3:37.19 | q |
| 13 | 1 | James Brewer | Great Britain & N.I. | 3:37.27 | |
| 14 | 1 | Juan Carlos Higuero | Spain | 3:37.33 | |
| 15 | 2 | Reyes Estévez | Spain | 3:37.55 | SB |
| 16 | 1 | Henok Legesse | Ethiopia | 3:37.79 | |
| 17 | 2 | Taoufik Makhloufi | Algeria | 3:37.87 | |
| 18 | 2 | Jeffrey Riseley | Australia | 3:38.00 | |
| 19 | 2 | Andrew Baddeley | Great Britain & N.I. | 3:38.23 | |
| 20 | 1 | Nathan Brannen | Canada | 3:38.97 | |
| 21 | 2 | Dorian Ulrey | United States | 3:39.33 | |
| 22 | 1 | Peter van der Westhuizen | South Africa | 3:40.00 | |
| 23 | 1 | Rui Silva | Portugal | 3:41.30 | |
| | 1 | Haron Keitany | Kenya | DNS | |

=== Final ===
| Rank | Name | Nationality | Time | Notes |
|---|---|---|---|---|
| 1st place, gold medalist(s) | Yusuf Saad Kamel | Bahrain | 3:35.93 | |
| 2nd place, silver medalist(s) | Deresse Mekonnen | Ethiopia | 3:36.01 | |
| 3rd place, bronze medalist(s) | Bernard Lagat | United States | 3:36.20 | |
| 4 | Asbel Kiprop | Kenya | 3:36.47 | |
| 5 | Augustine Kiprono Choge | Kenya | 3:36.53 | |
| 6 | Mohamed Moustaoui | Morocco | 3:36.57 | |
| 7 | Mehdi Baala | France | 3:36.99 | |
| 8 | Lopez Lomong | United States | 3:37.62 | |
| 9 | Belal Mansoor Ali | Bahrain | 3:37.72 | |
| 10 | Amine Laâlou | Morocco | 3:37.83 | |
| 11 | Abdalaati Iguider | Morocco | 3:38.35 | |
| 12 | Leonel Manzano | United States | 3:40.05 | |
