= 2009 World Championships in Athletics – Women's 3000 metres steeplechase =

The Women's 3,000 metres Steeplechase event at the 2009 World Championships in Athletics was held at the Olympic Stadium on August 15 and August 17. The Russian steeplechase team entered for the event was particularly strong, featuring world record holder and Olympic champion Gulnara Galkina, defending world champion Yekaterina Volkova, and third fastest of the year Yuliya Zarudneva. Other possible medallists included Marta Domínguez, who had the world-leading time prior to the competition, American record holder Jenny Barringer, and world junior record holder Ruth Bisibori.

On the first day of competition, Galkina won heat one, with Germany's Antje Möldner finishing not far behind with a national record-breaking run. African athletes Zemzem Ahmed and Gladys Kipkemoi shared the winning time in the second heat, a race which saw the defending champion Volkova eliminated from the competition.

In the final, the favourite Galkina led upon the final lap, when Domínguez and Zarudneva sped ahead of the field. Domínguez kicked in the final straight to take her first World Championship gold medal in 9:07.32. This was a Spanish record and the fourth fastest of all time, in what was only her ninth race in the steeplechase. Zarudneva held on for the silver medal and Milcah Chemos Cheywa, a Kenyan newcomer, took the bronze, both athletes with a personal best. The former champion Galkina had faded into fourth place, and out of the medals. A number of athletes in the rest of the field recorded personal bests, with highlights including Habiba Ghribi and Antje Möldner running national records, and Jennifer Barringer setting a new North American record.

On November 19, 2015, the Court of Arbitration for Sport found Domínguez guilty of an anti-doping rule violation and ordered that all competitive results obtained by Domínguez from 5 August 2009 be disqualified. Earlier in 2015, silver medalist Yuliya Zarudneva (now known as Zaripova) received a doping ban that did not backdate to the 2009 World Championships, therefore Zarudneva was not advanced to gold

== Medalists ==
Gold	Silver	Bronze
Vacated	Yuliya Zarudneva; Russia& Milcha Chemos Cheywa Kenya (KEN)	Gulnara Samitova-GalkinaRussia (RUS)

== Records ==
World record	Gulnara Samitova-Galkina (RUS)	8:58.81	Beijing, China	17 August 2008
Championship record	Yekaterina Volkova (RUS)	9:06.57	Osaka, Japan	27 August 2007
World leading	Marta Domínguez (ESP)	9:09.39	Barcelona, Spain	25 July 2009
African record	Eunice Jepkorir (KEN)	9:07.41	Beijing, China	17 August 2008
Asian record	Liu Nian (CHN)	9:26.25	Wuhan, China	2 November 2007
North American record	Jennifer Barringer (USA)	9:22.26	Beijing, China	17 August 2008
South American record	Sabine Heitling (BRA)	9:41.22	London, United Kingdom	25 July 2009
European record	Gulnara Samitova-Galkina (RUS)	8:58.81	Beijing, China	17 August 2008
Oceanian record	Donna MacFarlane (AUS)	9:18.35	Oslo, Norway	6 June 2008

- Jennifer Barringer improved her North American record by almost ten seconds, finishing with 9:12.50.

== Qualification standards ==
A time	B time
9:40.00	9:48.00

== Schedule ==
Date	Time	Round
August 15, 2009	10:50	Heats
August 17, 2009	20:30	Final

== Results ==
=== Heats ===
Qualification: First 4 in each heat (Q) and the next 3 fastest (q) advance to the final.

Rank	Heat	Name	Nationality	Time	Notes
1	1	Gulnara Samitova-Galkina	Russia	9:17.67	Q
2	1	Antje Möldner	Germany	9:21.73	Q, NR
3	1	Sofia Assefa	Ethiopia	9:22.63	Q
4	1	Milcah Chemos Cheywa	Kenya	9:23.87	Q
5	1	Eva Arias	Spain	9:25.14	q, PB
6	2	Habiba Ghribi	Tunisia	9:26.40	Q
7	2	Yuliya Zarudneva	Russia	9:26.64	Q
8	1	Jéssica Augusto	Portugal	9:26.64	q, SB
9	2	Jennifer Barringer	United States	9:26.81	Q
10	2	Katarzyna Kowalska	Poland	9:26.93	Q, PB
11	2	Ruth Bosibori	Kenya	9:27.04	q
12	2	Sara Moreira	Portugal	9:28.64	PB
13	3	Zemzem Ahmed	Ethiopia	9:29.36	Q, SB
14	3	Gladys Kipkemoi	Kenya	9:29.36	Q
15	2	Korahubsh Itaa	Ethiopia	9:33.67	
16	3	Sophie Duarte	France	9:34.08	Q
17	1	Ancuţa Bobocel	Romania	9:34.39	SB
18	3	Marta Domínguez	Spain	9:34.78	Q
19	1	Iríni Kokkinaríou	Greece	9:35.61	SB
20	3	Hanane Ouhaddou	Morocco	9:35.78	
21	3	Oxana Juravel	Moldova	9:36.63	NR
22	1	Yelena Sidorchenkova	Russia	9:37.16	
23	2	Ulrika Johansson	Sweden	9:38.88	PB
24	1	Minori Hayakari	Japan	9:39.28	SB
25	2	Helen Clitheroe	Great Britain & N.I.	9:41.71	
26	2	Diana Martín	Spain	9:42.39	PB
27	3	Yekaterina Volkova	Russia	9:43.52	
28	2	Élodie Olivarès	France	9:43.83	
29	3	Lívia Tóth	Hungary	9:45.14	
30	1	Lindsey Anderson	United States	9:46.03	
31	3	Sandra Eriksson	Finland	9:46.62	PB
32	3	Karoline Bjerkeli Grøvdal	Norway	9:48.47	
33	3	Cristina Casandra	Romania	9:49.88	
34	3	Bridget Franek	United States	9:50.02	
35	2	Sabine Heitling	Brazil	9:50.96	
36	1	Donna MacFarlane	Australia	9:52.46	SB
37	1	Durka Mana	Sudan	9:52.90	
38	1	Elena Romagnolo	Italy	9:56.61	
39	2	Roisin McGettigan	Ireland	9:59.10	
40	2	Silje Fjørtoft	Norway	10:01.04	
41	3	Aslı Çakır	Turkey	10:06.64	

Key: NR = National record, PB = Personal best, Q = qualification by place in heat, q = qualification by overall place, SB = Seasonal best

=== Final ===
Rank	Name	Nationality	Time	Notes
DQ	~~Marta Domínguez~~	~~Spain~~	~~9:07.32~~	~~WL, NR~~
2nd place, silver medalist(s)	Yuliya Zarudneva	Russia	9:08.39	PB
2nd place, silver medalist(s)	Milcah Chemos Cheywa	Kenya	9:08.57	PB
3rd place, bronze medalist(s)	Gulnara Samitova-Galkina	Russia	9:11.09	SB
4	Jennifer Barringer	United States	9:12.50	AR
5	Habiba Ghribi	Tunisia	9:12.52	NR
6	Ruth Bosibori	Kenya	9:13.16	PB
7	Gladys Kipkemoi	Kenya	9:14.62	PB
8	Antje Möldner	Germany	9:18.54	NR
9	Zemzem Ahmed	Ethiopia	9:22.64	SB
10	Jéssica Augusto	Portugal	9:25.25	SB
11	Katarzyna Kowalska	Poland	9:30.37	
12	Sofia Assefa	Ethiopia	9:31.29	
13	Eva Arias	Spain	9:33.34	
14	Sophie Duarte	France	9:33.85	

Key: AR = Area record, NR = National record, PB = Personal best, SB = Seasonal best, WL = World leading (in a given season)

Note: Marta Domínguez was disqualified in November 2015. Gold Medal has been left vacated because Yuliya Zarudneva took drugs too and got a ban.

=== Splits ===
Intermediate	Athlete	Country	Mark
1000m	Gulnara Galkina	Russia	3:01.26
2000m	Gladys Jerotich Kipkemoi	Kenya	6:06.45
