= 2009 World Championships in Athletics – Men's 10,000 metres =

The Men's 10,000 metres at the 2009 World Championships in Athletics was held at the Olympic Stadium on 17 August. A large field of 31 athletes from 15 countries was set to participate in the final, although Irishman Martin Fagan did not start the competition.

Kenenisa Bekele was the favourite before the race, having never lost a race over the distance and starting the race as the reigning Olympic and World champion, as well as the world record holder. Four-time major championship silver medallist Sileshi Sihine was another strong competitor, but he withdrew due to an injury and was replaced by Ethiopian team's reserve Imane Merga. Gebregziabher Gebremariam and Kenyans Moses Masai and Micah Kogo were other possible medallists, as well as the consistent Eritrea, Zersenay Tadese.

Tadese sprinted to lead the race at the start but he was soon overtaken by Nicholas Kemboi, who led until the 4000-metre mark. Tadese and Masai picked up the pace and the Eritrean fronted the fastest group of runners from 5000 metres onwards. After a kilometre further on, a group of four runners (Tadese, Masai, Bekele and Kogo) were clearly leading the race as the other competitors trailed off. Tadese continued to lead and picked up the pace once again, at which point Kogo dropped off, shortly followed by Masai. Bekele continued to follow Tadese waiting, and on the last lap the reigning champion finally took the lead, sprinting away to win the gold medal in a Championship record time of 26:46.31. Tadese took the silver, with a run of 26:50.12, and Masai maintained his third position for the bronze.

Ever the strongest performer, Bekele remained undefeated to win his fourth consecutive 10,000 m at the World Championships, but it was second-placed Tadese's first medal at the World Championships. Moses Masai's bronze was his family's second of the competition, as his sister Linet Masai had won the Women's 10,000 metres two days earlier.

== Medalists ==
Gold	Silver	Bronze
Kenenisa Bekele; Ethiopia	Zersenay Tadese; Eritrea	Moses Ndiema Masai; Kenya

== Records ==
Prior to the competition, the following world and championship records were as follows.

World record	Kenenisa Bekele (ETH)	26:17.53	Brussels, Belgium	26 August 2005
Championship record	Kenenisa Bekele (ETH)	26:49.57	Paris, France	24 August 2003
World leading	Josephat Muchiri Ndambiri (KEN)	26:57.36	Fukuroi, Japan	3 May 2009
African record	Kenenisa Bekele (ETH)	26:17.53	Brussels, Belgium	26 August 2005
Asian record	Ahmad Hassan Abdullah (QAT)	26:38.76	Brussels, Belgium	5 September 2003
North American record	Arturo Barrios (MEX)	27:08.23	Berlin, West Germany	18 August 1989
South American record	Marílson Gomes dos Santos (BRA)	27:28.12	Neerpelt, Belgium	2 June 2007
European record	Mohammed Mourhit (BEL)	26:52.30	Brussels, Belgium	3 September 1999
Oceanian record	Collis Birmingham (AUS)	27:29.73	Berkeley, United States	24 April 2009

The following new Championship record was set during this competition.

Date	Event	Name	Nationality	Time	CR	WR
17 August	Final	Kenenisa Bekele	Ethiopia	26:46.31	CR	

== Qualification standards ==
A time	B time
27:47.00	28:12.00

== Schedule ==
Date	Time	Round
17 August 2009	20:50	Final

== Final ==
Rank	Name	Nationality	Time	Notes
1st place, gold medalist(s)	Kenenisa Bekele	Ethiopia	26:46.31	CR
2nd place, silver medalist(s)	Zersenay Tadese	Eritrea	26:50.12	SB
3rd place, bronze medalist(s)	Moses Ndiema Masai	Kenya	26:57.39	SB
4	Imane Merga	Ethiopia	27:15.94	PB
5	Bernard Kipyego	Kenya	27:18.47	SB
6	Dathan Ritzenhein	United States	27:22.28	PB
7	Micah Kogo	Kenya	27:26.33	SB
8	Galen Rupp	United States	27:37.99	SB
9	Kidane Tadasse	Eritrea	27:41.50	SB
10	Gebregziabher Gebremariam	Ethiopia	27:44.04	SB
11	Ahmad Hassan Abdullah	Qatar	27:45.03	SB
12	Teklemariam Medhin	Eritrea	27:58.89	SB
13	Fabiano Joseph Naasi	Tanzania	28:04.32	SB
14	Juan Carlos Romero	Mexico	28:09.78	SB
15	Carles Castillejo	Spain	28:09.89	
16	Dickson Marwa	Tanzania	28:18.00	SB
17	Tim Nelson	United States	28:18.04	
18	Juan Luis Barrios	Mexico	28:31.40	
19	Surendra Kumar Singh	India	28:35.51	SB
20	Anatoliy Rybakov	Russia	28:42.28	
21	Ezekiel Jafari	Tanzania	28:45.34	
22	Martin Toroitich	Uganda	28:49.49	SB
23	Rui Pedro Silva	Portugal	28:51.40	
24	David McNeill	Australia	29:18.59	SB
25	Yuki Iwai	Japan	29:24.12	
	Collis Birmingham	Australia	DNF	
	Ayad Lamdassem	Spain	DNF	
	Manuel Ángel Penas	Spain	DNF	
	Abebe Dinkesa	Ethiopia	DNF	
	Nicholas Kemboi	Qatar	DNF	
	Martin Fagan	Ireland	DNS	

Key: CR = Championship record, DNF = Did not finish, DNS = Did not start, PB = Personal best, SB = Seasonal best

=== Splits ===
Intermediate	Athlete	Country	Mark
1000m	Nicholas Kemboi	Qatar	2:46.24
2000m	Nicholas Kemboi	Qatar	5:34.24
3000m	Nicholas Kemboi	Qatar	8:19.55
4000m	Nicholas Kemboi	Qatar	11:04.75
5000m	Moses Ndiema Masai	Kenya	13:40.45
6000m	Zersenay Tadese	Eritrea	16:18.75
7000m	Zersenay Tadese	Eritrea	18:57.73
8000m	Zersenay Tadese	Eritrea	21:37.80
9000m	Zersenay Tadese	Eritrea	24:13.73
