= 2009 World Championships in Athletics – Women's 10,000 metres =

The women's 10,000 metres at the 2009 World Championships in Athletics was held at the Olympic Stadium on 15 August. The Ethiopian team was particularly strong in the event, with two-time World Champion Tirunesh Dibaba, 5000 metres World Champion Meseret Defar, and African record holder Meselech Melkamu all vying for first place. The 2007 silver medallist Elvan Abeylegesse, Olympic bronze medallist Shalane Flanagan, and the World Cross Country Champion Florence Kiplagat were other athletes with strong medal possibilities.

The race featured a number of surprises and upsets, beginning with the withdrawal of the defending champion Dibaba due to a leg injury, replaced by Wude Ayalew. The race started awkwardly when the outer alley of the starting group, led by Florence Kiplagat, broke to the inside at the gun. Essentially Masai, Ayalew, Grace Momanyi and the other five runners on the outside who followed Kiplagat ran a course some 14 meters shorter than the twelve runners from the other larger alley. But confused officials did not recall the start or issue any disqualifications for the incident. Still, Inês Monteiro took the early lead with the outer runners falling in behind her. By the end of the first lap Yukari Sahaku and Yurika Nakamura had emerged as the pacesetters. After a kilometer, the Russian duo of Liliya Shobukhova and Mariya Konovalova took the lead. Konovalova held the point, marked by Nakamura at an even, leisurely pace for this crowd until just after eight laps to go when Linet Masai, who had been hanging around the back of the tight pack made a quick move to the front. All three Ethiopians rushed to mark the move. By the end of the lap, 2007 medallist Abeylegesse dropped out of the race and a quintet of runners ( Masai, Melkamu, Defar, Ayalew and Grace Momanyi) had broken away from the rest of the pack. Lap times dropped from the 75 second average to 71, to 69. But Masai's pace slowed back to 70 then 71. Momanyi came up to take the lead with the Ethiopians changing their focus though Ayalew was struggling to keep on the back behind Masai. After taking the break for a lap, Masai returned to take the lead. As the runners approached the finish line for the bell, favourites Defar and Melkamu sprinted in front. Defar held the lead through the final turn, with Melkamu boxing Masai, neither could completely break away. With clear running room coming off the turn, Masai tried to get her long legs going. She wasn't able to make much progress, nor could Melkamu pass her teammate until Defar began to fade, unable to maintain her speed. Melkamu took the lead. 14 meters out, Masai passed Melkamu. Perhaps not noticing, Melkamu prematurely celebrated but Masai was a meter ahead to take the gold medal with a tactically-timed run. Defar, completely exhausted, eventually finished in fifth as Ayalew sprinted past Momanyi to take the bronze.

Breaking a decade of Ethiopian dominance, nineteen-year-old Masai's gold medal was the first Kenyan victory in the event since the 1997 World Championships, and the country's first 10,000 m medal since 1999.

== Medalists ==
Gold	Silver	Bronze
Linet Masai; Kenya	Meselech Melkamu; Ethiopia	Wude Ayalew; Ethiopia

== Records ==
World record	Wang Junxia (CHN)	29:31.78	Beijing, China	8 September 1993
Championship record	Berhane Adere (ETH)	30:04.18	Paris, France	23 August 2003
World Leading	Meselech Melkamu (ETH)	29:53.80	Utrecht, Netherlands	14 June 2009
African record	Meselech Melkamu (ETH)	29:53.80	Utrecht, Netherlands	14 June 2009
Asian record	Wang Junxia (CHN)	29:31.78	Beijing, China	8 September 1993
North American record	Shalane Flanagan (USA)	30:22.22	Beijing, China	15 August 2008
South American record	Carmem de Oliveira (BRA)	31:47.76	Stuttgart, Germany	21 August 1993
European record	Elvan Abeylegesse (TUR)	29:56.34	Beijing, China	15 August 2008
Oceanian record	Kim Smith (NZL)	30:35.54	Palo Alto, United States	4 May 2008

== Qualification standards ==
A time	B time
31:45.00	32:20.00

== Schedule ==
Date	Time	Round
August 15, 2009	19:25	Final

== Results ==
Rank	Athlete	Nationality	Time	Notes
1st place, gold medalist(s)	Linet Masai	Kenya	30:51.24	SB
2nd place, silver medalist(s)	Meselech Melkamu	Ethiopia	30:51.34	
3rd place, bronze medalist(s)	Wude Ayalew	Ethiopia	30:51.95	
4	Grace Momanyi	Kenya	30:52.25	PB
5	Meseret Defar	Ethiopia	30:52.37	
6	Amy Yoder Begley	United States	31:13.78	PB
7	Yurika Nakamura	Japan	31:14.39	PB
8	Kim Smith	New Zealand	31:21.42	SB
9	Kayoko Fukushi	Japan	31:23.49	SB
10	Inês Monteiro	Portugal	31:25.67	PB
11	Mariya Konovalova	Russia	31:26.94	
12	Florence Jebet Kiplagat	Kenya	31:30.85	
13	Ana Dulce Félix	Portugal	31:30.90	PB
14	Shalane Flanagan	United States	31:32.19	
15	Kseniya Agafonova	Russia	31:43.14	
16	Ana Dias	Portugal	31:49.91	
17	Katie McGregor	United States	32:18.49	
18	Zhang Yingying	China	32:33.63	SB
19	Liliya Shobukhova	Russia	32:42.36	
20	Yukari Sahaku	Japan	33:41.17	
	Elvan Abeylegesse	Turkey	DNF	
	Olivera Jevtic	Serbia	DNS	

Key: PB = Personal best, SB = Seasonal best

=== Splits ===
Intermediate	Athlete	Country	Mark
1000m	Yurika Nakamura	Japan	3:08.85
2000m	Mariya Konovalova	Russia	6:17.01
3000m	Liliya Shobukhova	Russia	9:24.89
4000m	Mariya Konovalova	Russia	12:35.29
5000m	Mariya Konovalova	Russia	15:45.19
6000m	Mariya Konovalova	Russia	18:55.45
7000m	Linet Chepkwemoi Masai	Kenya	22:04.20
8000m	Linet Chepkwemoi Masai	Kenya	25:00.18
9000m	Meseret Defar	Ethiopia	27:58.29
