= 2009 World Championships in Athletics – Men's 20 kilometres walk =

The men's 20 kilometres walk event at the 2009 World Championships in Athletics was held throughout the city of Berlin on August 15, beginning and ending at the Brandenburg Gate.

== Medalists ==
Gold	Silver	Bronze
Wang Hao; China	Eder Sánchez; Mexico	Giorgio Rubino; Italy

== Records ==
World record	Vladimir Kanaykin (RUS)	1:17:16	Saransk, Russia	29 September 2007
Championship record	Jefferson Pérez (ECU)	1:17:21	Paris, France	23 August 2003
World Leading	Valeriy Borchin (RUS)	1:17:38	Adler, Russia	28 February 2009
African record	Hatem Ghoula (TUN)	1:19:02	Eisenhüttenstadt, Germany	10 May 1997
Asian record	Zhu Hongjun (CHN)	1:17:41	Cixi, China	23 April 2005
North American record	Julio René Martínez (GUA)	1:17:46	Eisenhüttenstadt, Germany	8 May 1999
South American record	Jefferson Pérez (ECU)	1:17:21	Paris, France	23 August 2003
European record	Vladimir Kanaykin (RUS)	1:17:16	Saransk, Russia	29 September 2007
Oceanian record	Nathan Deakes (AUS)	1:17:33	Cixi, China	23 April 2005

== Qualification standards ==
A Time	B Time
1:22:30	1:24:20

== Schedule ==
Date	Time	Round
August 15, 2009	13:00	Final

== Competition notes ==
With the 2007 champion and 2008 Olympic silver medallist Jefferson Pérez having retired, the reigning Olympic champion Valeriy Borchin was regarded as strong favourite. He had recorded the world-leading time prior to the tournament and had been undefeated that season. The Olympic third and fourth-place finishers, Jared Tallent and Wang Hao, were regarded as the strongest challengers to Borchin. Italians Giorgio Rubino and Ivano Brugnetti were singled out as medal contenders, while former world record holder and three-time World silver medallist Paquillo Fernández was seen as being past his peak.

Borchin prevailed and was first to cross the line at the Brandenburg gate, with a winning time of 1:18:41. Chinese athlete Hao improved upon his previous best to take the silver medal while Mexican Eder Sánchez produced a season's best performance for the bronze medal. The veteran competitor Paquillo Fernández withdrew from the race before the halfway mark.

Despite becoming the reigning World and Olympic champion, Borchin stated that he needed to achieve much more to match the achievements of his sporting heroes Jefferson Pérez and Robert Korzeniowski.

== Results ==
The medals of some of the athletics world championship events in 2009 were re-awarded 24 March 2016 as a result of doping disqualifications. Among these reallocations were the medals of the 20 km walk, which saw the Italian Giorgio Rubino, who originally finished fourth, awarded the bronze medal.

This allowed Italy to enter the medal table, with another bronze medal awarded to Antonietta Di Martino in 2019.

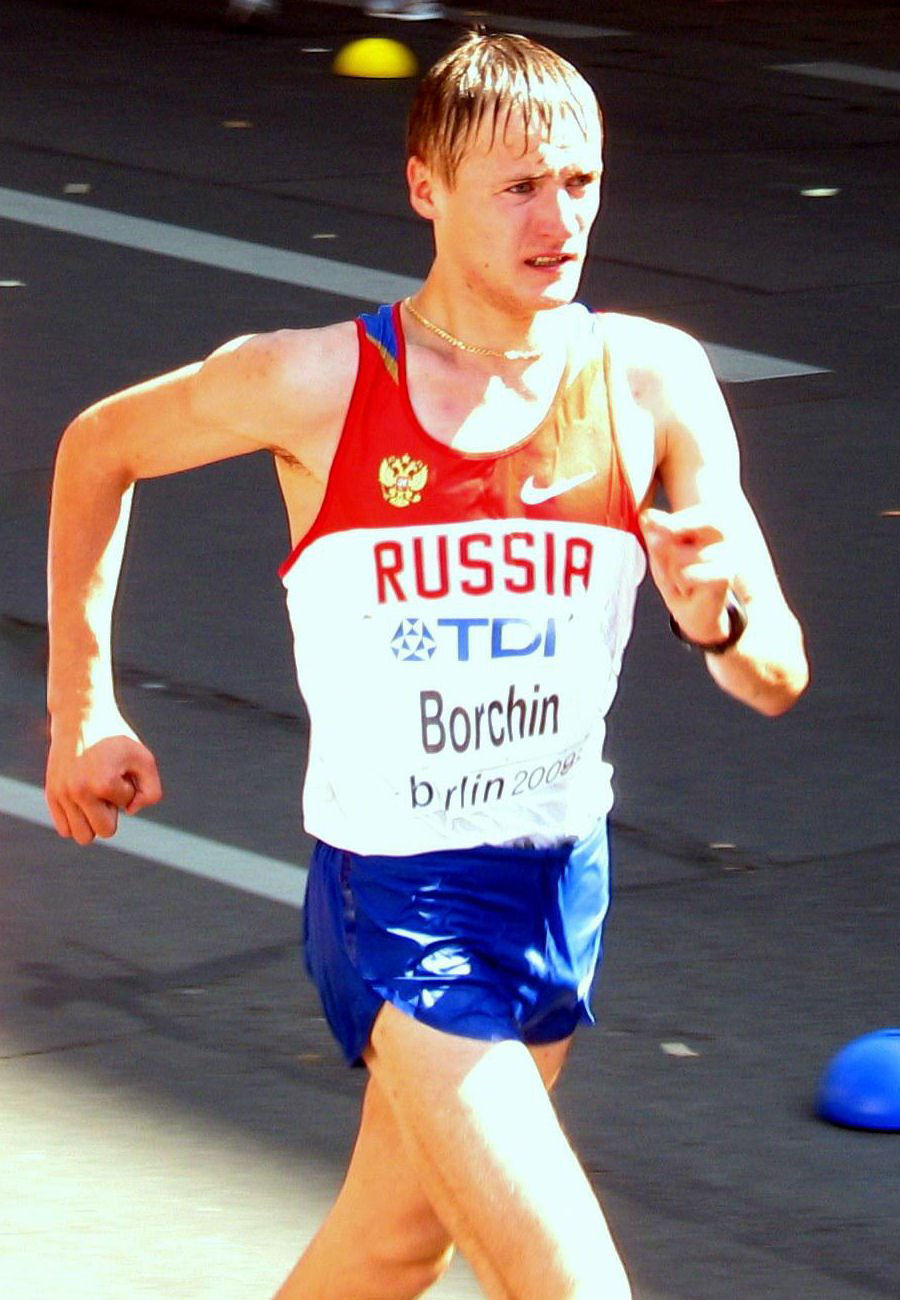
Valeriy Borchin won the competition but was later disqualified for doping

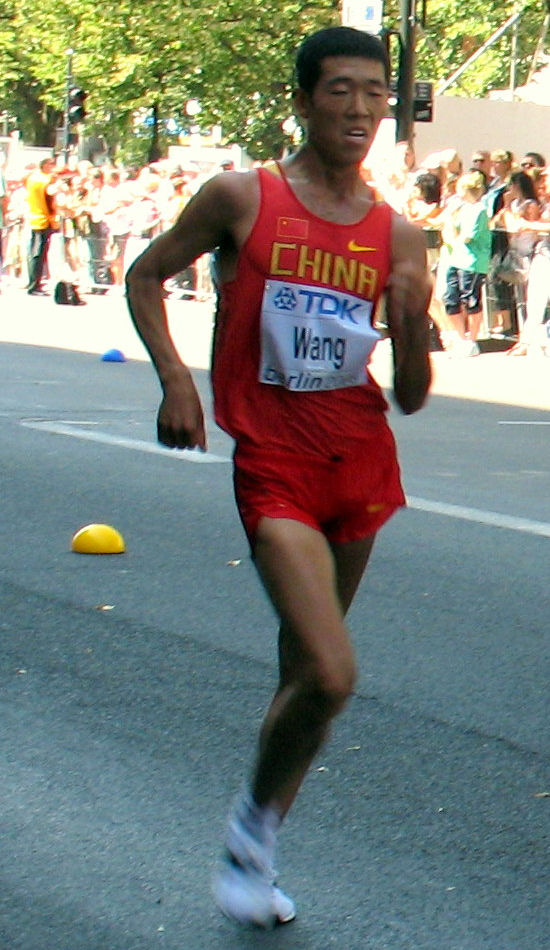
Wang Hao set a new personal best to take the silver (later upgraded to gold)

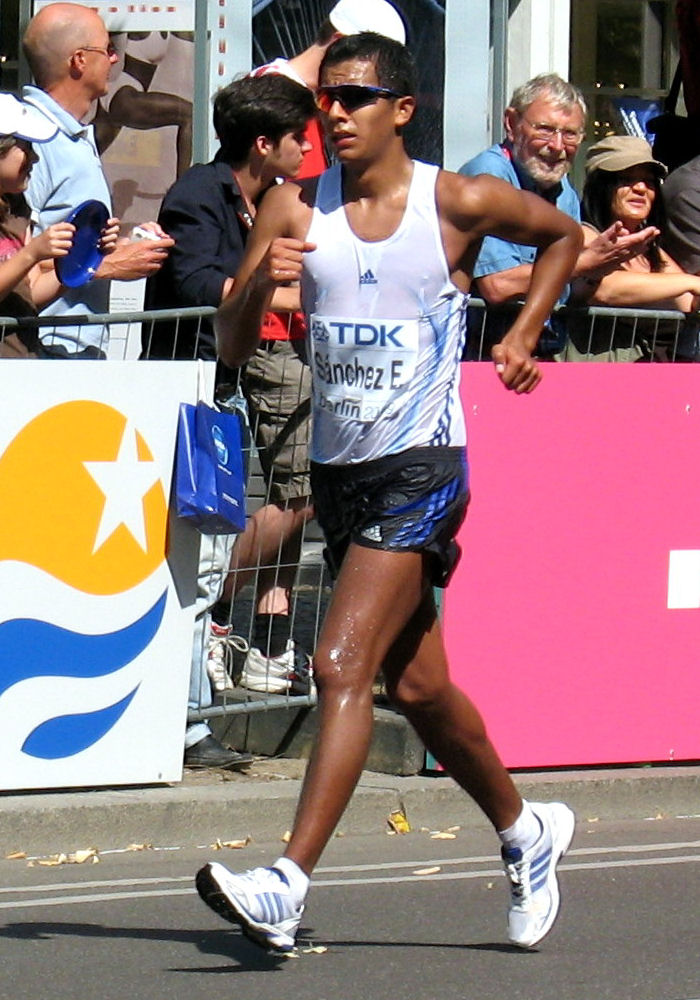
Eder Sánchez took the bronze (later upgraded to silver), his first World Championships medal

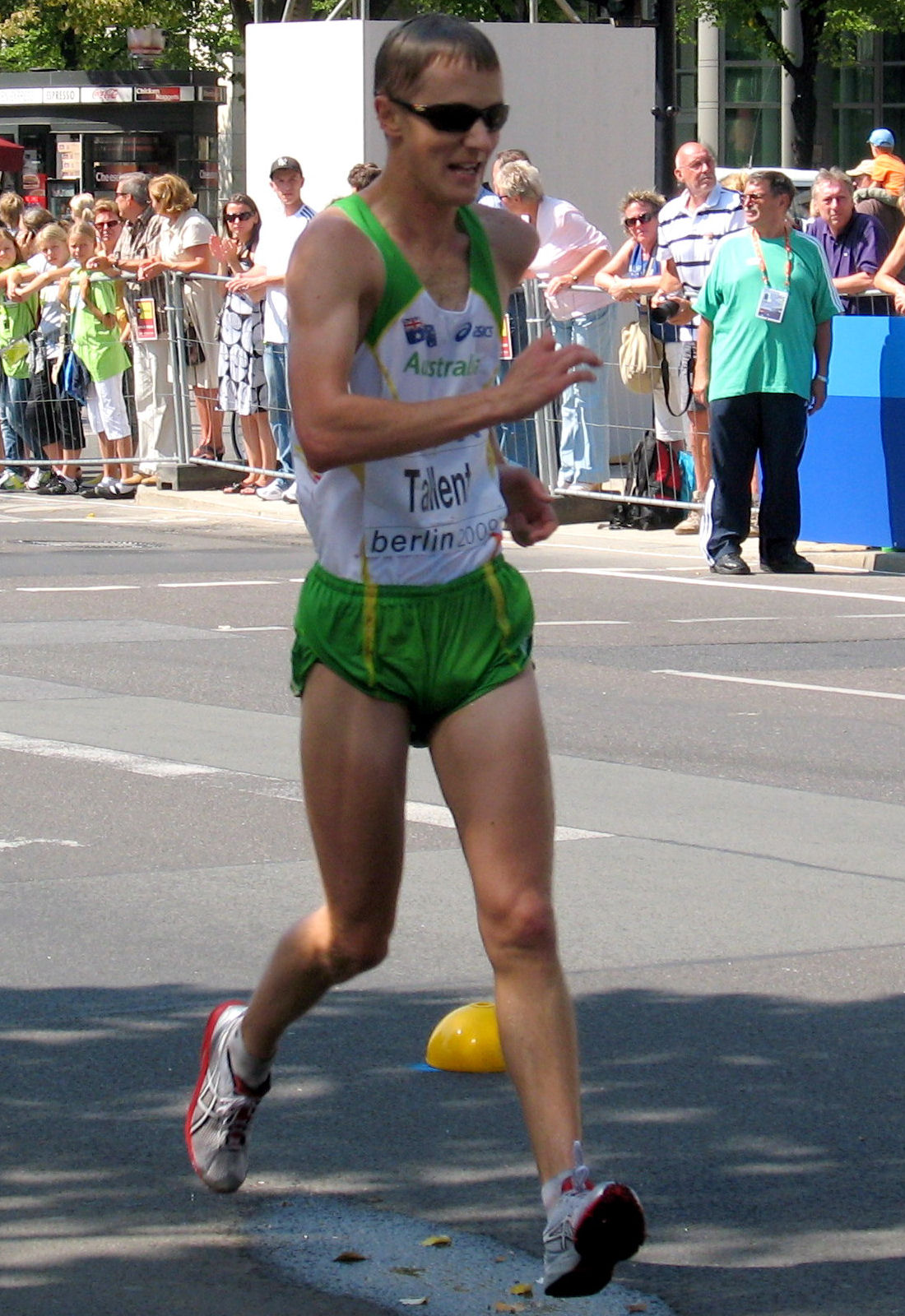
2008 Olympic medallist Jared Tallent only managed fifth place

Rank	Athlete	Nationality	Time	Notes
~~1~~	~~Valeriy Borchin~~	~~Russia~~	~~1:18:41~~	DQ (doping)
1st place, gold medalist(s)	Wang Hao	China	1:19:06	PB
2nd place, silver medalist(s)	Eder Sánchez	Mexico	1:19:22	SB
3rd place, bronze medalist(s)	Giorgio Rubino	Italy	1:19:50	
4	Luis Fernando López	Colombia	1:20:03	NR
5	Jared Tallent	Australia	1:20:27	
6	Erik Tysse	Norway	1:20:38	
7	Jesús Sánchez	Mexico	1:20:52	PB
8	Matej Tóth	Slovakia	1:21:13	
9	João Vieira	Portugal	1:21:43	SB
10	Koichiro Morioka	Japan	1:21:48	
11	Li Jianbo	China	1:21:54	
12	Zhu Yafei	China	1:21:56	
13	André Höhne	Germany	1:21:59	
14	Robert Heffernan	Ireland	1:22:09	SB
15	José Ignacio Díaz	Spain	1:22:12	SB
16	Andrey Krivov	Russia	1:22:19	
17	Luke Adams	Australia	1:22:37	
18	Hassanine Sebei	Tunisia	1:22:52	
19	Babubhai Panucha	India	1:23:06	NR
20	Jean-Jacques Nkouloukidi	Italy	1:23:07	SB
21	Dzianis Simanovich	Belarus	1:23:36	
22	Rolando Saquipay	Ecuador	1:23:51	SB
23	Juan Manuel Molina	Spain	1:24:00	
24	Park Chil-Sung	South Korea	1:24:01	
25	Artur Brzozowski	Poland	1:24:17	
26	Sérgio Vieira	Portugal	1:24:32	
27	Pedro Daniel Gómez	Mexico	1:24:39	
28	Yerko Araya	Chile	1:24:49	
29	Isamu Fujisawa	Japan	1:25:12	
30	Petr Trofimov	Russia	1:26:02	
31	David Kimutai	Kenya	1:26:35	
32	Ruslan Dmytrenko	Ukraine	1:27:01	
33	Kim Hyun-Sub	South Korea	1:27:08	
34	Predrag Filipović	Serbia	1:27:44	
35	Pavel Chihuan	Peru	1:27:54	
36	Rustam Kuvatov	Kazakhstan	1:28:47	SB
37	Jakub Jelonek	Poland	1:28:59	
38	Andrés Chocho	Ecuador	1:29:14	
39	Juan Manuel Cano	Argentina	1:29:20	SB
40	Allan Segura	Costa Rica	1:29:52	
41	Yusuke Suzuki	Japan	1:30:21	
42	Byun Youngjun	South Korea	1:30:35	
43	Mauricio Arteaga	Ecuador	1:32:25	
44	Vilius Mikelionis	Lithuania	1:32:53	
	Adam Rutter	Australia	DQ	
	Moacir Zimmermann	Brazil	DQ	
	José Alessandro Bagio	Brazil	DNF	
	Paquillo Fernández	Spain	DNF	
	Ivano Brugnetti	Italy	DNF	

Key: DNF = Did not finish, DQ = Disqualified, NR = National record, PB = Personal best, SB = Seasonal best
