= 2009 World Championships in Athletics – Women's marathon =

The Women's Marathon event at the 2009 World Championships in Athletics took place on August 23, 2009, in the streets of Berlin, Germany. The race started at 11:15h local time.

== Medalists ==
Gold	Bai Xue; PR China (CHN)
Silver	Yoshimi Ozaki; Japan (JPN)
Bronze	Aselefech Mergia; Ethiopia (ETH)

== Abbreviations ==
- All times shown are in hours:minutes:seconds

DNS	did not start
NM	no mark
WR	world record
AR	area record
NR	national record
PB	personal best
SB	season best

== Records ==
World record	Paula Radcliffe (GBR)	2:15:25	London, Great Britain	13 April 2003
Championship record	Paula Radcliffe (GBR)	2:20:57	Helsinki, Finland	14 August 2005
World leading	Irina Mikitenko (GER)	2:22:11	London, Great Britain	26 April 2009
African record	Catherine Ndereba (KEN)	2:18:47	Chicago, United States	7 October 2001
Asian record	Mizuki Noguchi (JPN)	2:19:12	Berlin, Germany	25 September 2005
North American record	Deena Kastor (USA)	2:19:36	London, Great Britain	23 April 2006
South American record	Carmem de Oliveira (BRA)	2:27:41	Boston, United States	18 April 1994
European record	Paula Radcliffe (GBR)	2:15:25	London, Great Britain	13 April 2003
Oceanian record	Benita Johnson (AUS)	2:22:36	Chicago, United States	22 October 2006

== Qualification standards ==
Standard
2:43:00

== Schedule ==
Date	Time	Round
August 23, 2009	11:15	Final

=== Intermediates ===
Intermediate	Athlete	Country	Mark
5 km	Epiphanie Nyirabarame	Rwanda	17:42
10 km	Epiphanie Nyirabarame	Rwanda	35:03
15 km	Zhou Chunxiu	China	52:10
20 km	Dire Tune	Ethiopia	1:09:47
Half Marathon	Nailiya Yulamanova	Russia	1:13:39
25 km	Nailiya Yulamanova	Russia	1:27:31
30 km	Nailiya Yulamanova	Russia	1:44:33
35 km	Bai Xue	China	2:01:04
40 km	Aselefech Mergia	Ethiopia	2:18:10

== Results ==
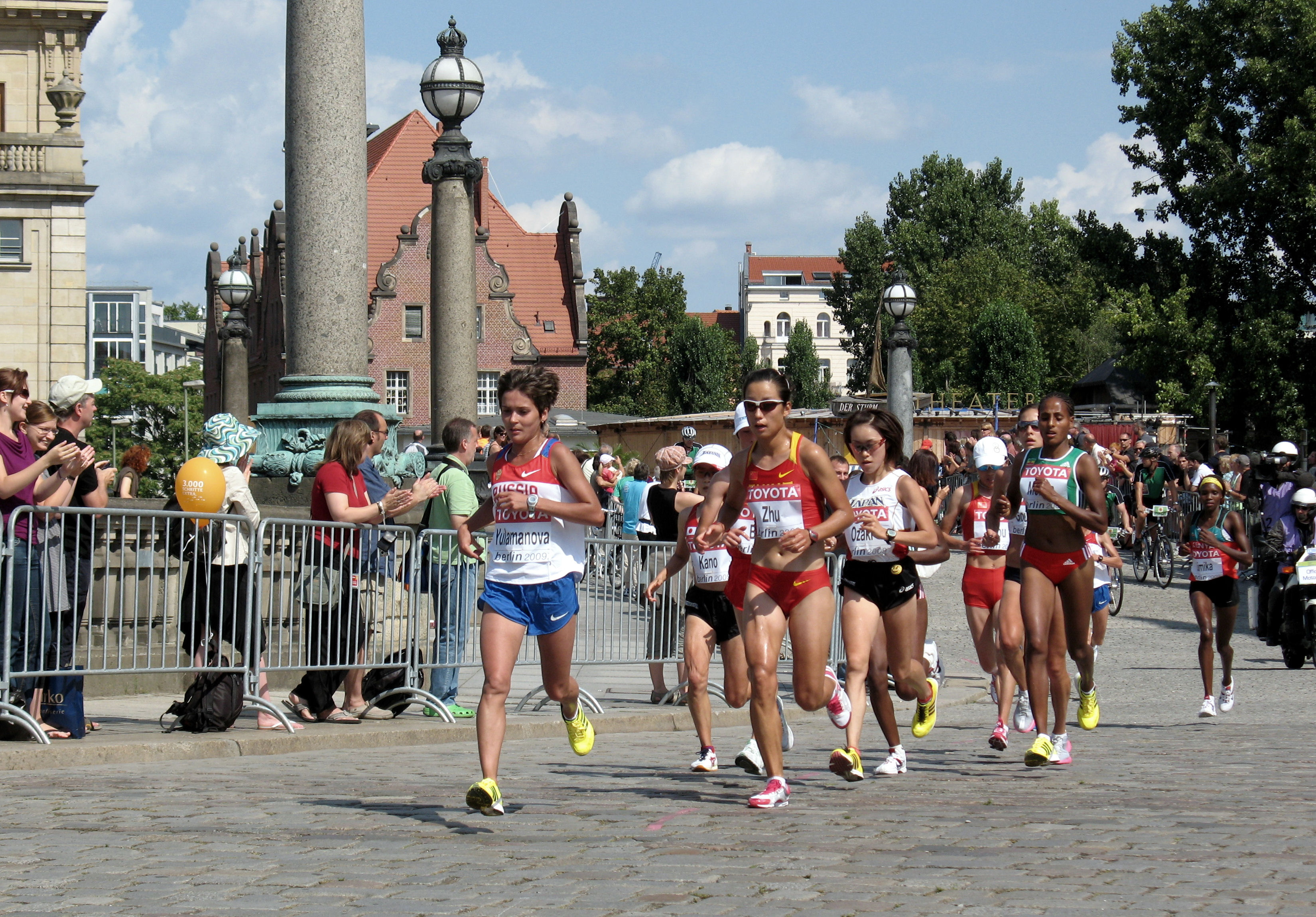
The women's marathon race gets underway in Berlin

Rank	Athlete	Nationality	Time	Notes
1st place, gold medalist(s)	Bai Xue	China	2:25:15	SB
2nd place, silver medalist(s)	Yoshimi Ozaki	Japan	2:25:25	SB
3rd place, bronze medalist(s)	Aselefech Mergia	Ethiopia	2:25:32	
4	Zhou Chunxiu	China	2:25:39	SB
5	Zhu Xiaolin	China	2:26:08	SB
6	Marisa Barros	Portugal	2:26:50	
7	Yuri Kano	Japan	2:26:57	SB
8	Alevtina Biktimirova	Russia	2:27:39	SB
9	Kara Goucher	United States	2:27:48	SB
10	Desireé Davila	United States	2:27:53	PB
11	Julia Mumbi Muraga	Kenya	2:28:59	SB
12	Sun Weiwei	China	2:29:39	SB
13	Yoshiko Fujinaga	Japan	2:29:53	
14	Svetlana Zakharova	Russia	2:29:55	
15	Bezunesh Bekele	Ethiopia	2:30:03	
16	Sabrina Mockenhaupt	Germany	2:30:07	SB
17	Lisa Jane Weightman	Australia	2:30:42	PB
18	Živilė Balčiūnaitė	Lithuania	2:31:06	SB
19	Kim Kum-Ok	North Korea	2:31:24	
20	Irene Limika	Kenya	2:31:29	
21	Lidia Șimon	Romania	2:32:03	
22	Dire Tune	Ethiopia	2:32:42	
23	Beata Naigambo	Namibia	2:33:05	PB
24	Alessandra Aguilar	Spain	2:33:38	
25	Epiphanie Nyirabarame	Rwanda	2:33:59	NR
26	Atsede Baysa	Ethiopia	2:36:04	
27	Tera Moody	United States	2:36:39	SB
28	Olga Glok	Russia	2:36:57	
29	Paige Higgins	United States	2:37:11	SB
30	Yukiko Akaba	Japan	2:37:43	
31	Lyubov Morgunova	Russia	2:38:23	
32	Jong Yong-Ok	North Korea	2:38:29	
33	Susanne Hahn	Germany	2:38:39	
34	Mary Davis	New Zealand	2:38:48	PB
35	Tara Quinn-Smith	Canada	2:39:19	SB
36	Risper Jemeli Kimaiyo	Kenya	2:39:23	
37	Patrizia Morceli	Switzerland	2:39:37	
38	Sun Suk Yun	South Korea	2:39:56	
39	Judith Ramírez	Mexico	2:40:18	
40	Fiona Docherty	New Zealand	2:40:18	PB
41	Un Suk Phyo	North Korea	2:40:39	
42	Adriana Aparecida da Silva	Brazil	2:40:54	PB
43	Shireen Crumpton	New Zealand	2:41:31	SB
44	Tanith Maxwell	South Africa	2:41:48	SB
45	Annemette Aagaard	Denmark	2:42:03	SB
46	Martha Komu	Kenya	2:42:14	SB
47	Chol Sun Kim	North Korea	2:42:18	
48	Patricia Lossouarn	France	2:42:40	
49	Laurence Klein	France	2:42:47	
50	Zoila Gómez	United States	2:42:49	SB
51	Remalda Kergyte	Lithuania	2:45:28	SB
52	Park Ho-sun	South Korea	2:47:16	
53	Stephanie Briand	France	2:48:16	
54	Yamna Oubouhou	France	2:50:02	SB
55	Hilaria Johannes	Namibia	2:50:19	SB
56	Sandra Ruales	Ecuador	2:50:36	
57	Jane Suuto	Uganda	2:52:44	
58	Cécile Moynot	France	2:54:21	
59	Nuţa Olaru	Romania	3:00:59	
	Nailiya Yulamanova	Russia	(2:27:08)	DQ (doping)
	Magdaliní Gazéa	Greece	DQ	
	Maria Zeferina Baldaia	Brazil	DNF	
	Robe Guta	Ethiopia	DNF	
	Ulrike Maisch	Germany	DNF	
	Luminița Zaituc	Germany	DNF	
	Yeoryía Abatzídou	Greece	DNF	
	Helena Loshanyang Kirop	Kenya	DNF	
	Victoria Poludina	Kyrgyzstan	DNF	
	Lee Sun-Young	South Korea	DNF	
	Dulce María Rodríguez	Mexico	DNF	
	Luvsanlkhundeg Otgonbayar	Mongolia	DNF	
	Clara Morales	Chile	DNS	
	Luminiţa Talpoş	Romania	DNS	

== See also ==
- 2009 World Marathon Cup
