= 2009 World Championships in Athletics – Women's 800 metres =

Women's 800 metres at the 2009 World Championships
- Venue: Olympic Stadium
- Dates: 16 August (heats); 17 August (semifinals); 19 August (final)
- Competitors: 43 from 32 nations
- Winning time: 1:55.45

Medalists
gold medal	Caster Semenya; South Africa
silver medal	Janeth Jepkosgei; Kenya
bronze medal	Jenny Meadows; Great Britain & N.I.

The women's 800 metres at the 2009 World Championships in Athletics was held at the Olympic Stadium on 16, 17 and 19 August. The winning margin was 2.45 seconds which as of 2024 is the greatest winning margin in the women's 800 metres at these championships and the only time this event has been won by more than two seconds at these championships.

Prior to the championships, there was no clear favourite for the race – the twenty fastest times of the season had been run by seventeen different athletes. The reigning World and Olympic champions, Janeth Jepkosgei and Pamela Jelimo, had not shown the dominance of previous seasons. The two fastest runners of the season, Caster Semenya and Maggie Vessey, had recently set personal bests but lacked any major championships experience, while third best Anna Alminova was a 1500 metres specialist. European Indoor Champion Mariya Savinova and Svetlana Klyuka, fourth at the Olympics, were other strong competitors. The 2007 World medallists Hasna Benhassi and Mayte Martínez, and Olympic finalist Yuliya Krevsun were also predicted as medal possibilities.

The events in the heats resulted in a surprise decision: world-leader Semenya accidentally tripped Jepkosgei and the defending champion finished last in the first heat. The Kenyan athletics federation appealed the decision and she was reinstated to run in the second semi-final, and Semenya was not disqualified as her actions were deemed unintentional. Yuliya Krevsun, Elisa Cusma Piccione, and Zulia Calatayud were the fastest of the heat winners on the first day of competition. With only eight places on offer, there were a number of high-profile scalps in the semi-finals. The first race saw past medallists Calatayud and Benhassi fail to qualify, Svetlana Klyuka was fifth in the second heat, while Vessey and Jelimo dropped out in the third semi-final of the day. Caster Semenya was the fastest in the preliminaries with 1:58.66.

In the final, Semenya lead the race from the halfway mark, and continued to increase her lead from that point onwards, winning her first World Championship gold medal in a time of one minute and 55.45 seconds. Krevsun was in second place near the end of final straight, but she faded a little and allowed Jepkosgei and Jenny Meadows to challenge her position. With just a tenth of a second between second and fourth, Krevsun fell behind the Kenyan and British athletes, who ended up with the silver and bronze medals.

Semenya's victory was one of the focal points of the championship, not just because of her achievement on the track at such a young age, but also because of the events that followed. Having beaten her previous 800 m best by four seconds at the African Junior Championships just a month earlier, her quick improvements came under scrutiny. The combination of her rapid athletic progression and her appearance culminated in the IAAF asking her to take a gender test to ascertain whether she was female. A number of South African governing bodies came to the defence of Semenya, saying the athlete had been treated unfairly, and world record holder Michael Johnson was highly critical of the way that the sensitive issue had been dealt with publicly.

== Medalists ==
Gold	Silver	Bronze
Caster Semenya; South Africa	Janeth Jepkosgei Busienei; Kenya	Jenny Meadows; Great Britain & N.I.

== Records ==
World record	Jarmila Kratochvílová (TCH)	1:53.28	Munich, West Germany	26 July 1983
Championship record	Jarmila Kratochvílová (TCH)	1:54.68	Helsinki, Finland	9 August 1983
World leading	Caster Semenya (RSA)	1:55.45	Berlin, Germany	19 August 2009
African record	Pamela Jelimo (KEN)	1:54.01	Zürich, Switzerland	29 August 2008
Asian record	Liu Dong (CHN)	1:55.54	Beijing, China	9 September 1993
North American record	Ana Fidelia Quirot (CUB)	1:54.44	Barcelona, Spain	9 September 1989
South American record	Letitia Vriesde (SUR)	1:56.68	Gothenburg, Sweden	13 August 1995
European record	Jarmila Kratochvílová (TCH)	1:53.28	Munich, West Germany	26 July 1983
Oceanian record	Toni Hodgkinson (NZL)	1:58.25	Atlanta, United States	27 July 1996

== Qualification standards ==
A time	B time
2:00.00	2:01.30

== Schedule ==
Date	Time	Round
16 August 2009	10:10	Heats
17 August 2009	19:30	Semi-finals
19 August 2009	21:35	Final

== Results ==
=== Heats ===
Qualification: First 3 in each heat(Q) and the next 6 fastest(q) advance to the semi-finals.

Rank	Heat	Name	Nationality	Time	Notes
1	3	Yuliya Krevsun	Ukraine	2:02.20	Q
2	4	Elisa Cusma Piccione	Italy	2:02.33	Q
2	6	Zulia Calatayud	Cuba	2:02.33	Q
4	4	Anna Rostkowska	Poland	2:02.37	Q
5	4	Halima Hachlaf	Morocco	2:02.46	Q
6	3	Jenny Meadows	Great Britain & N.I.	2:02.47	Q
7	4	Elena Kofanova	Russia	2:02.49	q
8	1	Caster Semenya	South Africa	2:02.51	Q
9	1	Geena Gall	United States	2:02.63	Q
10	3	Hazel Clark	United States	2:02.67	Q
11	6	Hasna Benhassi	Morocco	2:02.83	Q
12	1	Tetyana Petlyuk	Ukraine	2:02.87	Q
13	3	Lucia Klocová	Slovakia	2:02.98	q
14	6	Marilyn Okoro	Great Britain & N.I.	2:03.07	Q
15	2	Mariya Savinova	Russia	2:03.27	Q
16	4	Lenka Masná	Czech Republic	2:03.32	q
17	2	Jemma Simpson	Great Britain & N.I.	2:03.33	Q
18	2	Mayte Martínez	Spain	2:03.39	Q
19	6	Svetlana Klyuka	Russia	2:03.40	q
20	5	Pamela Jelimo	Kenya	2:03.50	Q
21	2	Élodie Guégan	France	2:03.87	q
22	3	Marian Burnett	Guyana	2:03.89	q
23	1	Olga Cristea	Moldova	2:03.99	
24	5	Maggie Vessey	United States	2:04.07	Q
25	2	Irina Krakoviak	Lithuania	2:04.26	
26	2	Elena Mirela Lavric	Romania	2:04.49	
27	5	Kenia Sinclair	Jamaica	2:04.52	Q
28	1	Neisha Bernard-Thomas	Grenada	2:04.55	
29	5	Rosibel García	Colombia	2:04.73	
30	5	Jana Hartmann	Germany	2:04.99	
31	1	Madeleine Pape	Australia	2:05.85	
32	6	Daniela Reina	Italy	2:06.30	
33	4	Eleni Filandra	Greece	2:06.39	
34	6	Anabelle Lascar	Mauritius	2:06.53	SB
35	5	Nataliia Lupu	Ukraine	2:06.74	
36	2	Leonor Piuza	Mozambique	2:08.08	
37	5	Salome Dell	Papua New Guinea	2:08.22	
38	1	Janeth Jepkosgei Busienei	Kenya	2:12.81	qR
39	3	Yeliz Kurt	Turkey	2:13.42	
40	4	Natalia Gallego	Andorra	2:18.75	
41	3	Aishath Reesha	Maldives	2:28.00	NR
42	6	Nikki Hamblin	New Zealand	2:31.94	
	3	Sanaa Abubkheet	Palestine	DQ	

Key: NR = National record, Q = qualification by place in heat, q = qualification by overall place, SB = Seasonal best

=== Semi-finals ===
Janeth Jepkosgei was tripped in the first round heats, and after protest by the Kenyan Federation, was added to the semi-finals; she will run in lane 7 of heat 2 along with Hazel Clark. The ruling was that the trip was accidental, by Caster Semenya, who was therefore not disqualified.

Qualification: First 2 in each semifinals(Q) and the next 2 fastest(q) advance to the final.

Rank	Heat	Name	Nationality	Time	Notes
1	2	Caster Semenya	South Africa	1:58.66	Q
2	1	Mariya Savinova	Russia	1:59.30	Q
3	1	Yuliya Krevsun	Ukraine	1:59.38	Q
4	2	Jenny Meadows	Great Britain & N.I.	1:59.45	Q
5	2	Janeth Jepkosgei Busienei	Kenya	1:59.47	q
6	1	Mayte Martínez	Spain	1:59.72	q, SB
7	2	Hazel Clark	United States	1:59.96	SB
8	1	Hasna Benhassi	Morocco	2:00.06	
9	2	Svetlana Klyuka	Russia	2:00.48	
10	1	Jemma Simpson	Great Britain & N.I.	2:00.57	
11	3	Elisa Cusma Piccione	Italy	2:00.62	Q
12	2	Tetyana Petlyuk	Ukraine	2:00.90	
13	3	Marilyn Okoro	Great Britain & N.I.	2:01.01	Q
14	1	Geena Gall	United States	2:01.30	
15	3	Anna Rostkowska	Poland	2:01.40	
16	1	Zulia Calatayud	Cuba	2:01.53	
17	2	Lucia Klocová	Slovakia	2:01.56	
18	3	Elena Kofanova	Russia	2:02.02	
19	3	Kenia Sinclair	Jamaica	2:02.31	
20	3	Lenka Masná	Czech Republic	2:02.55	
21	2	Marian Burnett	Guyana	2:02.75	
22	3	Maggie Vessey	United States	2:03.55	
23	1	Élodie Guégan	France	2:04.38	
	2	Halima Hachlaf	Morocco	DNF	
	3	Pamela Jelimo	Kenya	DNF	

=== Final ===
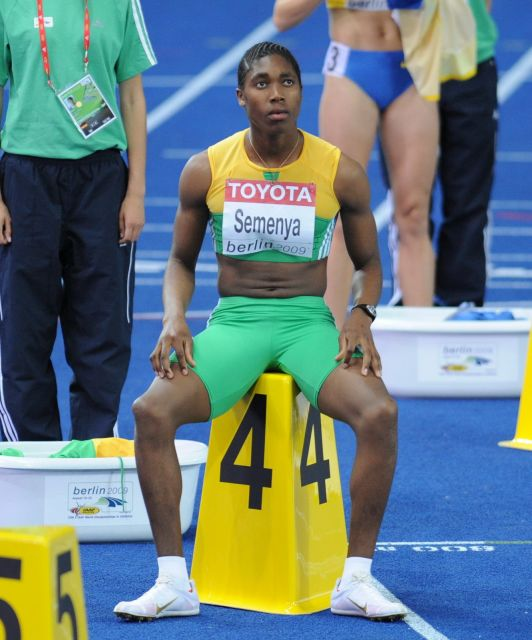
Caster Semenya won her first World Championship gold medal despite a controversial build up

Rank	Name	Nationality	Time	Notes
1st place, gold medalist(s)	Caster Semenya	South Africa	1:55.45	WL
2nd place, silver medalist(s)	Janeth Jepkosgei Busienei	Kenya	1:57.90	SB
3rd place, bronze medalist(s)	Jenny Meadows	Great Britain & N.I.	1:57.93	PB
4	Yuliya Krevsun	Ukraine	1:58.00	SB
5	Mariya Savinova	Russia	1:58.68	
6	Elisa Cusma Piccione	Italy	1:58.81	SB
7	Mayte Martinez	Spain	1:58.81	SB
8	Marilyn Okoro	Great Britain & N.I.	2:00.31	

Key: PB = Personal best, SB = Seasonal best, WL = World leading (in a given season)
