= 2009 World Championships in Athletics – Women's 1500 metres =

The women's 1500 metres at the 2009 World Championships in Athletics was held at the Olympic Stadium between 18–23 August. The winning margin was 0.01 seconds which as of 2024 is the narrowest winning margin in the women's 1500 metres at these championships.

It was originally won by Natalia Rodríguez of Spain, but she was disqualified for tripping Gelete Burka of Ethiopia. Burka had been in the lead for the majority of the race, but Rodríguez had caught up and tripped Burka. Burka ended up finishing last and was visibly upset of what had happened. Rodríguez was disqualified. Defending champion Maryam Yusuf Jamal of Bahrain received the gold, Lisa Dobriskey of Great Britain received the silver, and Shannon Rowbury of the United States received the bronze. In addition, Mariem Alaoui Selsouli of Morocco was disqualified before the final for testing positive for Erythropoietin. She was not replaced.

== Medalists ==
Gold	Silver	Bronze
Maryam Yusuf Jamal; Bahrain	Lisa Dobriskey; Great Britain & N.I.	Shannon Rowbury; United States

== Records ==
World record	Qu Yunxia (CHN)	3:50.46	Beijing, China	11 September 1993
Championship record	Tatyana Tomashova (RUS)	3:58.52	Paris, France	31 August 2003
World leading	Maryam Yusuf Jamal (BHR)	3:56.55	Rome, Italy	10 July 2009
African record	Hassiba Boulmerka (ALG)	3:55.30	Barcelona, Spain	8 August 1992
Asian record	Qu Yunxia (CHN)	3:50.46	Beijing, China	11 September 1993
North American record	Mary Slaney (USA)	3:57.12	Stockholm, Sweden	26 July 1983
South American record	Letitia Vriesde (SUR)	4:05.67	Tokyo, Japan	31 August 1991
European record	Tatyana Kazankina (URS)	3:52.47	Zürich, Switzerland	13 August 1980
Oceanian record	Sarah Jamieson (AUS)	4:00.93	Stockholm, Sweden	25 July 2006

== Qualification standards ==
A time	B time
4:06.00	4:09.00

== Schedule ==
Date	Time	Round
August 18, 2009	12:05	Heats
August 21, 2009	20:00	Semifinals
August 23, 2009	17:00	Final

== Results ==
=== Heats ===
Qualification: First 6 in each heat (Q) and the next 6 fastest (q) advance to the semifinals.

Rank	Heat	Name	Nationality	Time	Notes
1	2	Gelete Burka	Ethiopia	4:07.75	Q
2	2	Natalia Rodríguez	Spain	4:07.84	Q
3	2	Lisa Dobriskey	Great Britain & N.I.	4:07.90	Q
4	2	Natalya Yevdokimova	Russia	4:08.06	Q
5	3	Anna Alminova	Russia	4:08.13	Q
5	2	Anna Willard	United States	4:08.13	Q
7	3	Nancy Lagat	Kenya	4:08.16	Q
8	2	Btissam Lakhouad	Morocco	4:08.21	Q
9	3	Kalkidan Gezahegne	Ethiopia	4:08.23	Q
9	3	Christin Wurth-Thomas	United States	4:08.23	Q
11	2	Mimi Belete	Bahrain	4:08.36	q
12	3	Sylwia Ejdys	Poland	4:08.59	Q
13	3	Sonja Roman	Slovenia	4:08.65	Q
14	1	Maryam Yusuf Jamal	Bahrain	4:08.76	Q
15	1	Nuria Fernández	Spain	4:08.79	Q
16	1	Meskerem Assefa	Ethiopia	4:08.86	Q
16	1	Mariem Alaoui Selsouli	Morocco	4:08.86	Q
18	1	Iryna Lishchynska	Ukraine	4:08.95	Q
19	1	Irina Krakoviak	Lithuania	4:08.96	Q
20	1	Viola Kibiwot	Kenya	4:09.18	q
21	3	Anna Mishchenko	Ukraine	4:09.26	q
22	1	Lidia Chojecka	Poland	4:09.38	q
23	2	Nikki Hamblin	New Zealand	4:09.60	q
24	3	Iris Fuentes-Pila	Spain	4:09.71	q
25	1	Oksana Zbrozhek	Russia	4:09.84	
26	1	Charlene Thomas	Great Britain & N.I.	4:09.91	
27	3	Adrienne Herzog	Netherlands	4:10.10	
28	1	Shannon Rowbury	United States	4:10.30	qR
29	3	Siham Hilali	Morocco	4:10.57	
30	2	Hind Déhiba Chahyd	France	4:11.41	q
31	3	Deirdre Byrne	Ireland	4:12.19	
32	2	Tamara Tverdostup	Ukraine	4:13.36	
33	2	Alemitu Bekele	Turkey	4:13.69	SB
34	1	Marina Munćan	Serbia	4:15.18	
35	1	Eliane Saholinirina	Madagascar	4:16.63	
36	2	Susan Kuijken	Netherlands	4:18.10	
37	3	Stephanie Twell	Great Britain & N.I.	4:18.23	
38	2	Irene Jelagat	Kenya	4:27.36	
39	3	Sladjana Pejovic	Montenegro	4:28.67	
40	3	Francine Nzilampa	DR Congo	4:30.56	NR
41	2	Aldy Villalobos	Nicaragua	4:50.55	PB
42	1	Eva Pereira	Cape Verde	5:04.95	PB

Key: NR = National record, PB = Personal best, Q = qualification by place in heat, q = qualification by overall place, SB = Seasonal best

=== Semifinals ===
Qualification: First 5 in each semifinal (Q) and the next 2 fastest (q) advance to the final.

Rank	Heat	Name	Nationality	Time	Notes
1	1	Maryam Yusuf Jamal	Bahrain	4:03.64	Q
2	1	Natalia Rodríguez	Spain	4:03.73	Q, SB
3	1	Lisa Dobriskey	Great Britain & N.I.	4:03.84	Q
4	1	Christin Wurth-Thomas	United States	4:04.16	Q
5	1	Kalkidan Gezahegne	Ethiopia	4:04.75	Q
6	1	Natalya Yevdokimova	Russia	4:04.93	q
7	1	Lidia Chojecka	Poland	4:06.53	q
8	1	Viola Kibiwot	Kenya	4:06.88	
9	1	Iris Fuentes-Pila	Spain	4:07.10	
10	1	Sonja Roman	Slovenia	4:07.10	
11	1	Btissam Lakhouad	Morocco	4:08.72	
12	2	Gelete Burka	Ethiopia	4:10.19	Q
13	2	Mariem Alaoui Selsouli	Morocco	4:10.46	Q
14	2	Anna Willard	United States	4:10.47	Q
15	2	Shannon Rowbury	United States	4:10.51	Q
16	2	Nuria Fernández	Spain	4:10.64	Q
17	2	Nikki Hamblin	New Zealand	4:10.96	
18	1	Anna Mishchenko	Ukraine	4:11.02	
19	2	Nancy Lagat	Kenya	4:11.10	
20	2	Hind Déhiba Chahyd	France	4:11.22	
21	2	Sylwia Ejdys	Poland	4:11.33	
22	1	Irina Krakoviak	Lithuania	4:12.54	
23	2	Anna Alminova	Russia	4:12.55	
24	2	Mimi Belete	Bahrain	4:13.30	
	2	Iryna Lishchynska	Ukraine	DNF	
	2	Meskerem Assefa	Ethiopia	DNS	

=== Final ===
Rank	Name	Nationality	Time	Notes
1st place, gold medalist(s)	Maryam Yusuf Jamal	Bahrain	4:03.74	
2nd place, silver medalist(s)	Lisa Dobriskey	Great Britain & N.I.	4:03.75	
3rd place, bronze medalist(s)	Shannon Rowbury	United States	4:04.18	
4	Nuria Fernández	Spain	4:04.91	
5	Christin Wurth-Thomas	United States	4:05.21	
6	Anna Willard	United States	4:06.19	
7	Lidia Chojecka	Poland	4:07.17	
8	Kalkidan Gezahegne	Ethiopia	4:08.81	
9	Gelete Burka	Ethiopia	4:11.21	
	Natalia Rodríguez	Spain	~~4:03:37~~	DQ
	Natalya Yevdokimova	Russia	~~4:07.71~~	DQ
	Mariem Alaoui Selsouli	Morocco		DNS/DQ
