= 2009 World Championships in Athletics – Men's 5000 metres =

The men's 5000 metres at the 2009 World Championships in Athletics were held at the Olympic Stadium on 20 and 23 August

== Medalists ==
Gold	Silver	Bronze
Kenenisa Bekele; Ethiopia	Bernard Lagat; United States	James Kwalia C'Kurui; Qatar

== Summary ==
In hindsight, this race was the confluence of many top athletes. Kenenisa Bekele was already the world record holder, the Woolworth double (5 and 10) Olympic champion and the champion at 10,000 here. At 27, this would be his last successful major championship race. At 35, Bernard Lagat (a Kenyan transplant to USA) would continue to medal internationally for another 5 years. Lagat was the defending champion and was the second fastest 1500 runner of all time. Eliud Kipchoge had the championship record from 2003 and would go on to greater fame in marathon running, winning the Olympic gold medal in 2016 and 2021. And setting the official world record in 2018 and the assisted world record in 2019. A lesser known British runner named Mo Farah was making his first World Championship final after disappointment in the 2008 Olympics. Two years later, he would go on to start a 6 year long major championship winning streak that would encompass two Olympics and four World Championships in both the 5 and 10.

With the mixture of strength runners like Bekele and Kipchoge, and kickers like Lagat and Farah, the strategy was a question mark. Could the strength runners burn off the kickers? Bekele started fast, and most of the field followed along in tow. Farah lagged 15 metres behind, 100 metres into the race. University of Wisconsin teammates Matt Tegenkamp and Chris Solinsky marked Bekele as the pace slowed at first. Bekele led with an uneven pace, running as fast as 60 seconds a lap and as slow as 64. Everybody else followed for 2300 metres until the Kenyan team, led by Joseph Ebuya all moved to the front as much to assert an even pace if not a fast pace. Bekele moved back to control the race, marked by Lagat, Kipchoge, Moses Ndiema Kipsiro and Kenyan transplant to Qatar, James Kwalia C'Kurui. Just under 800 metres to go, Ebuya stepped to the right and gave up. After coming to a virtual stop he jogged and rejoined the race well out of contention. The same five leaders remained together at the bell with Jesús España sprinting up to be in short lived contention. As they sped around the turn and into the backstretch, those five separated from the chasers. With España fading, Tegenkamp was the last left trying to bridge the gap. Bekele held the lead through the final turn, with Lagat moving into position to put his move on. Coming off the turn, Lagat pounced and took the lead, but only by inches. Side by side, Bekele on the inside and Lagat on the outside, the two sprinted shoulder to shoulder for 40 metres, then Bekele edged in front, slowly widening the gap for a little over a metre by the finish. Behind them Kwalia emerged from the group to take the bronze.

== Records ==
World record	Kenenisa Bekele (ETH)	12:37.35	Hengelo, Netherlands	31 May 2004
Championship record	Eliud Kipchoge (KEN)	12:52.79	Paris, France	31 August 2003
World leading	Kenenisa Bekele (ETH)	12:56.23	Rome, Italy	10 July 2009
African record	Kenenisa Bekele (ETH)	12:37.35	Hengelo, Netherlands	31 May 2004
Asian record	Saif Saaeed Shaheen (QAT)	12:51.98	Rome, Italy	14 July 2006
North American record	Bob Kennedy (USA)	12:58.21	Zürich, Switzerland	14 August 1996
South American record	Marílson Gomes dos Santos (BRA)	13:19.43	Kassel, Germany	8 June 2006
European record	Mohammed Mourhit (BEL)	12:49.71	Brussels, Belgium	25 August 2000
Oceanian record	Craig Mottram (AUS)	12:55.76	London, Great Britain	30 July 2004

== Qualification standards ==
A time	B time
13:20.00	13:29.00

== Schedule ==
Date	Time	Round
20 August 2009	18:55	Heats
23 August 2009	16:25	Final

== Results ==
=== Heats ===
Qualification: First 5 in each heat(Q) and the next 5 fastest(q) advance to the final.

Rank	Heat	Name	Nationality	Time	Notes
1	1	Kenenisa Bekele	Ethiopia	13:19.77	Q
2	1	Matt Tegenkamp	United States	13:19.87	Q
3	1	Mo Farah	Great Britain & N.I.	13:19.94	Q
4	1	Vincent Kiprop Chepkok	Kenya	13:20.24	Q
5	1	Jesús España	Spain	13:20.40	Q
6	1	Chris Solinsky	United States	13:20.64	q
7	1	Joseph Ebuya	Kenya	13:22.41	q
8	1	Anis Selmouni	Morocco	13:22.95	q
9	2	Moses Ndiema Kipsiro	Uganda	13:22.98	Q, SB
10	2	Eliud Kipchoge	Kenya	13:23.34	Q
11	1	Teklemariam Medhin	Eritrea	13:23.48	q
12	1	Collis Birmingham	Australia	13:23.48	q
13	2	James Kwalia C'Kurui	Qatar	13:23.57	Q
14	2	Bernard Lagat	United States	13:23.73	Q
15	2	Chakir Boujattaoui	Morocco	13:23.83	Q
16	2	Bekana Daba	Ethiopia	13:23.86	
17	1	Saif Saaeed Shaheen	Qatar	13:26.35	
18	2	Samuel Tsegay	Eritrea	13:26.78	
19	1	Geofrey Kusuro	Uganda	13:28.48	SB
20	2	Morhad Amdouni	France	13:29.64	
21	2	Kidane Tadasse	Eritrea	13:30.85	
22	2	Alemayehu Bezabeh	Spain	13:33.52	
23	1	Ali Abdosh	Ethiopia	13:36.52	q
24	1	Daniele Meucci	Italy	13:37.79	
25	2	Evan Jager	United States	13:39.80	
26	2	Hussain Jamaan Alhamdah	Saudi Arabia	13:44.59	
27	2	Alistair Cragg	Ireland	13:46.34	
28	2	Arne Gabius	Germany	13:49.13	
29	2	Moses Kibet	Uganda	13:52.38	
30	2	Sergio Sánchez	Spain	13:53.51	
31	2	Marco Joseph	Tanzania	13:53.67	
32	2	Tonny Wamulwa	Zambia	14:01.67	SB
33	1	Etienne Bizimana	Burundi	14:06.02	PB
34	1	Yuichiro Ueno	Japan	14:30.76	
35	2	Mohamed Ali Mohamed	Somalia	14:34.62	PB
36	2	Omar Abusaid	Palestine	15:14.88	PB
	1	Byron Piedra	Ecuador	DNF	
	1	Juan Luis Barrios	Mexico	DNS	
	1	Fabiano Joseph Naasi	Tanzania	DNS	

Key: PB = Personal best, SB = Seasonal best

=== Final ===
Rank	Name	Nationality	Time	Notes
1st place, gold medalist(s)	Kenenisa Bekele	Ethiopia	13:17.09	
2nd place, silver medalist(s)	Bernard Lagat	United States	13:17.33	
3rd place, bronze medalist(s)	James Kwalia C'Kurui	Qatar	13:17.78	
4	Moses Ndiema Kipsiro	Uganda	13:18.11	SB
5	Eliud Kipchoge	Kenya	13:18.95	
6	Ali Abdosh	Ethiopia	13:19.11	
7	Mo Farah	Great Britain & N.I.	13:19.69	
8	Matthew Tegenkamp	United States	13:20.23	
9	Vincent Kiprop Chepkok	Kenya	13:21.31	
10	Jesús España	Spain	13:22.07	
11	Chakir Boujattaoui	Morocco	13:23.05	
12	Chris Solinsky	United States	13:25.87	
13	Joseph Ebuya	Kenya	13:39.59	
14	Anis Selmouni	Morocco	13:44.59	
15	Teklemariam Medhin	Eritrea	13:44.65	
16	Collis Birmingham	Australia	13:55.58	

Key: SB = Seasonal best

==== Splits ====
Intermediate	Athlete	Country	Mark
1000m	Kenenisa Bekele	Ethiopia	2:54.35
2000m	Kenenisa Bekele	Ethiopia	5:34.17
3000m	Kenenisa Bekele	Ethiopia	8:14.63
4000m	Kenenisa Bekele	Ethiopia	10:52.22
