= Japan at the 2009 World Championships in Athletics =

- WA code: JPN
- National federation: Japan Association of Athletics Federations

in Berlin
- Competitors: 57
- Medals: Gold 0 Silver 1 Bronze 1 Total 2

World Championships in Athletics appearances
- 1983; 1987; 1991; 1993; 1995; 1997; 1999; 2001; 2003; 2005; 2007; 2009; 2011; 2013; 2015; 2017; 2019; 2022; 2023; 2025

Japan competed at the 2009 World Championships in Athletics from 15 to 23 August. A team of 57 athletes was announced in preparation for the competition. Selected athletes have achieved one of the competition's qualifying standards. Koji Murofushi (hammer throw), Yuki Yamazaki (50 km walk), and the athletes from the Marathon team were considered the country's best medal chances.

== Team selection ==
Track and road events

| Event | Athletes | |
| Event | Men | Women |
|---|---|---|
| 100 metres | Masashi Eriguchi; Shintaro Kimura; Naoki Tsukahara | Momoko Takahashi; Chisato Fukushima |
| 200 meters | Shinji Takahira; Hitoshi Saito; Kenji Fujimitsu | Chisato Fukushima; Momoko Takahashi |
| 400 metres | Yuzo Kanemaru; Hideyuki Hirose | Asami Tanno |
| 4 x 100 metres relay | Masashi Eriguchi; Shintaro Kimura; Naoki Tsukahara; Shinji Takahira; Hitoshi Saito; Kenji Fujimitsu | Momoko Takahashi; Chisato Fukushima; Mayumi Watanabe; Maki Wada; Asuka Terada |
| 4 x 400 metres relay | | Asami Tanno; Satomi Kubokura; Sayaka Aoki; Mayu Sato; Miho Shingu |
| 5000 metres | Yuichiro Ueno | Yurika Nakamura; Yuriko Kobayashi |
| 10,000 metres | Yuki Iwai | Yukari Sahaku; Kayoko Fukushi; Yurika Nakamura |
| Marathon | Satoshi Irifune; Masaya Shimizu; Kazuhiro Maeda; Arata Fujiwara; Atsushi Sato | Yoshimi Ozaki; ~~Yoko Shibui~~; Yoshiko Fujinaga; Yuri Kano; Yukiko Akaba |
| 100 metres hurdles | — | Asuka Terada |
| 110 metres hurdles | Tasuku Tanonaka | — |
| 400 metres hurdles | Kenji Narisako; Kazuaki Yoshida | Satomi Kubokura; Sayaka Aoki |
| 3000 m steeplechase | Yoshitaka Iwamizu | Minori Hayakari |
| 20 km race walk | Koichiro Morioka; Isamu Fujisawa; Yusuke Suzuki | Masumi Fuchise; Mayumi Kawasaki; Kumi Otoshi |
| 50 km race walk | Yuki Yamazaki; Koichiro Morioka; Takayuki Tanii | — |

Field and combined events

| Event | Athletes | |
| Event | Men | Women |
|---|---|---|
| Pole vault | Daichi Sawano; Takafumi Suzuki | Takayo Kondo |
| High jump | Naoyuki Daigo | |
| Long jump | Daisuke Arakawa | Sachiko Masumi |
| Hammer throw | ~~Koji Murofushi~~ | |
| Javelin throw | Yukifumi Murakami | Yuki Ebihara |
| Decathlon | Daisuke Ikeda | — |

== Results ==
=== Men ===
Track and road events

| Event | Athletes | Heat Round 1 | | Heat Round 2 | | Semifinal | | Final | |
| Event | Athletes | Result | Rank | Result | Rank | Result | Rank | Result | Rank |
|---|---|---|---|---|---|---|---|---|---|
| 100 m | Masashi Eriguchi | 10.38 | 3 | 10.45 | 8 | did not advance | | | |
| 100 m | Shintaro Kimura | 10.47 | 3 | 10.54 | 8 | did not advance | | | |
| 100 m | Naoki Tsukahara | 10.28 | 2 | 10.15 | 3 | 10.25 | 8 | did not advance | |
| 200 m | Shinji Takahira | 20.86 | 2 | 20.69 | 4 | did not advance | | | |
| 200 m | Hitoshi Saito | 21.38 | 6 | did not advance | | | | | |
| 200 m | Kenji Fujimitsu | 20.69 | 3 | 20.97 | 6 | did not advance | | | |
| 400 m | Yuzo Kanemaru | 46.83 | 4 | — | | did not advance | | | |
| 400 m | Hideyuki Hirose | 46.80 | 7 | — | | did not advance | | | |
| 5000 m | Yuichiro Ueno | 14:30.76 | 16 | — | | | | did not advance | |
| 10,000 m | Yuki Iwai | — | | | | | | 29:24.12 | 25 |
| 110 m hurdles | Tasuku Tanonaka | 13.84 | 7 | — | | did not advance | | | |
| 400 m hurdles | Kenji Narisako | 49.60 | 5 | — | | did not advance | | | |
| 400 m hurdles | Kazuaki Yoshida | 49.45 PB | 3 | — | | 50.34 | 8 | did not advance | |
| 3000 m steeplechase | Yoshitaka Iwamizu | 8:39.03 | 9 | — | | | | did not advance | |
| 4 × 100 m relay | Masashi Eriguchi; Naoki Tsukahara; Shinji Takahira; Kenji Fujimitsu | 38.53 | 2 | — | | | | 38.30 | 4 |
| Marathon | Satoshi Irifune | — | | | | | | 2:14:54 | 14 |
| Marathon | Masaya Shimizu | — | | | | | | 2:14:06 | 11 |
| Marathon | Kazuhiro Maeda | — | | | | | | 2:19:59 | 39 |
| Marathon | Arata Fujiwara | — | | | | | | 2:31:06 | 61 |
| Marathon | Atsushi Sato | — | | | | | | 2:12:05 | 6 |
| 20 km walk | Koichiro Morioka | — | | | | | | 1:21:48 | 11 |
| 20 km walk | Isamu Fujisawa | — | | | | | | 1:25:12 | 30 |
| 20 km walk | Yusuke Suzuki | — | | | | | | 1:30:21 | 42 |
| 50 km walk | Yuki Yamazaki | — | | | | | | DQ | — |
| 50 km walk | Koichiro Morioka | — | | | | | | 3:56:21 | 18 |
| 50 km walk | Takayuki Tanii | — | | | | | | DQ | — |

Field and combined events

| Event | Athletes | Qualification | | Final | |
| Event | Athletes | Result | Rank | Result | Rank |
|---|---|---|---|---|---|
| Long jump | Daisuke Arakawa | 7.53 | 22 | did not advance | |
| High jump | Naoyuki Daigo | 2.20 | 11 | did not advance | |
| Pole vault | Daichi Sawano | 5.55 | 5 | 5.50 | 10 |
| Pole vault | Takafumi Suzuki | 5.25 | 17 | did not advance | |
| Javelin throw | Yukifumi Murakami | 83.10 PB | 1 | 82.97 | Bronze medal |
| Decathlon | Daisuke Ikeda | — | | 7788 PB | 26 |

=== Women ===
Track and road events

| Event | Athletes | Heat Round 1 | | Heat Round 2 | | Semifinal | | Final | |
| Event | Athletes | Result | Rank | Result | Rank | Result | Rank | Result | Rank |
|---|---|---|---|---|---|---|---|---|---|
| 100 m | Momoko Takahashi | 11.75 | 4 | did not advance | | | | | |
| 100 m | Chisato Fukushima | 11.52 | 4 | 11.43 | 7 | did not advance | | | |
| 200 m | Chisato Fukushima | 23.40 | 4 | — | | did not advance | | | |
| 200 m | Momoko Takahashi | 23.61 | 7 | — | | did not advance | | | |
| 400 m | Asami Tanno | 53.30 | 5 | — | | did not advance | | | |
| 5000 m | Yurika Nakamura | 15:21.01 PB | 6 | — | | | | 15:13.01 PB | 12 |
| 5000 m | Yuriko Kobayashi | 15:23.96 | 8 | — | | | | 15:12.44 | 11 |
| 10,000 m | Yukari Sahaku | — | | | | | | 33:41.17 | 20 |
| 10,000 m | Kayoko Fukushi | — | | | | | | 31:23.49 | 9 |
| 10,000 m | Yurika Nakamura | — | | | | | | 31:14.39 PB | 7 |
| 100 m hurdles | Asuka Terada | 13.41 | 6 | — | | did not advance | | | |
| 400 m hurdles | Satomi Kubokura | 56.91 | 5 | — | | did not advance | | | |
| 400 m hurdles | Sayaka Aoki | 1:03.56 | 7 | — | | did not advance | | | |
| 3000 m steeplechase | Minori Hayakari | 9:39.28 | 10 | — | | | | did not advance | |
| 4 × 100 m relay | Chisato Fukushima; Momoko Takahashi; Mayumi Watanabe; Maki Wada | 44.24 | 4 | — | | | | did not advance | |
| 4 × 400 m relay | Sayaka Aoki; Asami Tanno; Mayu Sato; Satomi Kubokura | 3:34.46 | 8 | — | | | | did not advance | |
| Marathon | Yoshimi Ozaki | — | | | | | | 2:25:25 | Silver medal |
| Marathon | Yoshiko Fujinaga | — | | | | | | 2:29:53 | 14 |
| Marathon | Yuri Kano | — | | | | | | 2:26:57 | 7 |
| Marathon | Yukiko Akaba | — | | | | | | 2:37:43 | 31 |
| 20 km walk | Masumi Fuchise | — | | | | | | 1:31:15 | 7 |
| 20 km walk | Mayumi Kawasaki | — | | | | | | DQ | — |
| 20 km walk | Kumi Otoshi | — | | | | | | 1:33:05 | 12 |

Field events

| Event | Athletes | Qualification | | Final | |
| Event | Athletes | Result | Rank | Result | Rank |
|---|---|---|---|---|---|
| Long jump | Sachiko Masumi | 6.23 | 15 | did not advance | |
| Pole vault | Takayo Kondo | 4.10 | 15 | did not advance | |
| Javelin throw | Yuki Ebihara | 54.81 | 12 | did not advance | |
