= Ethiopia at the 2009 World Championships in Athletics =

Ethiopia at the 2009 World Championship in Athletics
- WA code: ETH
- National federation: Ethiopian Athletics Federation
- Website: www.ethiosports.com?page_id=18

in Berlin
- Competitors: 38 (20 men and 18 women)
- Medals: Gold 2 Silver 2 Bronze 4 Total 8

Ethiopia competed at the 2009 World Championships in Athletics from 15 to 23 August. A team of 38 athletes competed after achieving one of the competition's qualifying standards. The squad composed of middle and long distance specialists featured three reigning world champions: Meseret Defar (5000 m), Tirunesh Dibaba (10,000 m), and Kenenisa Bekele (10,000 m). Because a champion is given a bye into the championships, Ethiopia was permitted to enter an extra athlete in those events, and the Ethiopian Athletics Federation also picked a reserve athlete in these events.

== Team selection ==
Event	Athletes	
Event	Men	Women
1500 metres	Deresse Mekonnen; Henok Legesse; Mekonnen Gebremedhin	Gelete Burka; Meskerem Assefa; Kalkidan Gezhagne
5000 metres	Kenenisa Bekele; Imane Merga; Ali Abdosh; Bekana Daba	Tirunesh Dibaba; Meselech Melkamu; Meseret Defar; Sentayehu Ejigu; Genzebe Dibaba
10,000 metres	Kenenisa Bekele; Sileshi Sihine; Gebregziabher Gebremariam; Abebe Dinkesa	Meselech Melkamu; Tirunesh Dibaba; Meseret Defar; Wude Ayalew; Aberu Kebede
Marathon	Tsegaye Kebede; Deriba Merga; Yemane Tsegaye; Deressa Chemdessa; Dejene Berhanu; Getachew Terfe	Teyba Erkesso; Bezunesh Bekele; Atsede Bayissa; Asselefech Mergia; Dire Tune
3000 m steeplechase	Yacob Jarso; Roba Gary; Legesse Lemiso	Zemzem Ahmed; Sofia Assefa; Korahubesh Itaa

== Results ==
=== Men ===
Event	Athletes	Heat Round 1		Heat Round 2		Semifinal		Final	
Event	Athletes	Result	Rank	Result	Rank	Result	Rank	Result	Rank
1500 m	Deresse Mekonnen	3:37.04	1			3:36.86	4	3:36.01	2
1500 m	Henok Legesse								
1500 m	Mekonnen Gebremedhin								
5000 m	Kenenisa Bekele								
5000 m	Imane Merga								
5000 m	Ali Abdosh								
5000 m	Bekana Daba								
10,000 m	Kenenisa Bekele								
10,000 m	Sileshi Sihine								
10,000 m	Gebregziabher Gebremariam								
10,000 m	Abebe Dinkesa								
3000 m steeplechase	Yacob Jarso								
3000 m steeplechase	Roba Gary								
3000 m steeplechase	Legesse Lemiso								
Marathon	Tsegaye Kebede								
Marathon	Deriba Merga								
Marathon	Yemane Tsegaye								
Marathon	Deressa Chemdessa								
Marathon	Dejene Berhanu								
Marathon	Getachew Terfe								

=== Women ===
Event	Athletes	Heat Round 1		Heat Round 2		Semifinal		Final	
Event	Athletes	Result	Rank	Result	Rank	Result	Rank	Result	Rank
1500 m	Gelete Burka								
1500 m	Meskerem Assefa								
1500 m	Kalkidan Gezhagne								
5000 m	Tirunesh Dibaba								
5000 m	Meselech Melkamu								
5000 m	Meseret Defar								
5000 m	Sentayehu Ejigu								
5000 m	Genzebe Dibaba								
10,000 m	Meselech Melkamu								
10,000 m	Tirunesh Dibaba								
10,000 m	Meseret Defar								
10,000 m	Wude Ayalew								
10,000 m	Aberu Kebede								
3000 m steeplechase	Zemzem Ahmed	9:29.36 PB	1 Q						
3000 m steeplechase	Sofia Assefa	9:22.63	3 Q						
3000 m steeplechase	Korahubesh Itaa	9:33.67	7	did not advance					
Marathon	Teyba Erkesso								
Marathon	Bezunesh Bekele								
Marathon	Atsede Bayissa								
Marathon	Asselefech Mergia								
Marathon	Dire Tune								
