= Kenya at the 2009 World Championships in Athletics =

- WA code: KEN
- National federation: Athletics Kenya
- Website: www.athleticskenya.org

in Berlin
- Competitors: 43 (24 men, 19 women)
- Medals: Gold 4 Silver 5 Bronze 2 Total 11

World Championships in Athletics appearances (overview)
- 1983; 1987; 1991; 1993; 1995; 1997; 1999; 2001; 2003; 2005; 2007; 2009; 2011; 2013; 2015; 2017; 2019; 2022; 2023; 2025

Kenya competed at the 2009 World Championships in Athletics from 15 to 23 August. A team of 43 athletes was announced in preparation for the competition. Selected athletes have achieved one of the competition's qualifying standards. The Kenyan team, characteristically strong in the middle- and long-distance running events, includes reigning world champions Alfred Yego and Janeth Jepkosgei, and reigning Olympic champions Pamela Jelimo, Nancy Jebet Lagat, and Brimin Kipruto.

== Team selection ==
Track and road events

Event	Athletes	
Event	Men	Women
400 metres	Mark Mutai	Joy Sakari
800 metres	Asbel Kipruto Kiprop; Jackson Mumbwa Kivuna; David Rudisha; Alfred Kirwa Yego	Pamela Jelimo; Janeth Jepkosgei
1500 metres	Augustine Kiprono Choge; Haron Keitany; Asbel Kipruto Kiprop	Irene Jelagat; Viola Kibiwot; Nancy Jebet Lagat
5000 metres	Vincent Kiprop Chepkok; Joseph Ebuya; Eliud Kipchoge	Iness Chepkesis Chenonge; Vivian Cheruiyot; Sylvia Jebiwott Kibet
10,000 metres	Bernard Kiprop Kipyego; Micah Kogo; Moses Ndiema Masai	Florence Jebet Kiplagat; Linet Chepkwemoi Masai; Grace Momanyi
Marathon	Robert Kipkoech Cheruiyot; Benjamin Kiptoo; Abel Kirui; Emmanuel Mutai; Daniel Rono	Risper Jemeli Kimaiyo; Helena Loshanyang Kirop; Martha Komu; Irene Limika; Julia Mumbi Muraga
3000 m steeplechase	Ezekiel Kemboi; Brimin Kiprop Kipruto; Paul Kipsiele Koech; Richard Kipkemboi Mateelong	Milkah Chemos Cheiywa; Gladys Jerotich Kipkemoi; Ruth Bosibori
20 km race walk	David Kimutai	

== Results ==
=== Men ===
Track and road events

Event	Athletes	Heat Round 1		Heat Round 2		Semifinal		Final	
Event	Athletes	Result	Rank	Result	Rank	Result	Rank	Result	Rank
400 m	Mark Mutai								
800 m									
1500 m									
5000 m									
10,000 m									
3000 m steeplechase									
Marathon									
20 km walk	David Kimutai							1:26.35	32

=== Women ===
Track and road events

Event	Athletes	Heat Round 1		Heat Round 2		Semifinal		Final	
Event	Athletes	Result	Rank	Result	Rank	Result	Rank	Result	Rank
400 m	Joy Sakari								
800 m									
1500 m									
5000 m									
10,000 m									
3000 m steeplechase									
Marathon									
