= Dorian Ulrey =

American distance runner

Personal information
- Nationality: United States
- Born: 11 July 1987 (age 39) Silvis, Illinois, U.S.
- Height: 5 ft 10 in (1.78 m)

Sport
- Sport: Track, long-distance running
- Events: 1500 meters, mile, 5000 meters
- College team: University of Northern Iowa '08 University of Arkansas '11
- Club: Brooks Beast Seattle
- Turned pro: 2011

Achievements and titles
- Personal best: 1500 meters: 3:35.23 (2009)
Medal record
Men's athletics
Representing United States
USATF Outdoor Championships

Dorian Ulrey (born July 11, 1987, in Silvis, Illinois) is an American professional runner sponsored by Brooks.

== NCAA ==
Dorian was the 2010 NCAA Division 1 national champion at 3000 meters, an 11-time all American, 3-time Missouri Valley Conference champion, 8-time SEC champion, 2009 World Championship 1500 meter semi-finalist, and 2009 Team USA world championship member.

He attended the University of Northern Iowa and the University of Arkansas.

== Professional ==
Ulrey finished 15th in 1500 meters at 2016 US Olympic Trials (track and field).
