= Wude Ayalew =

Ethiopian long-distance runner (born 1987)

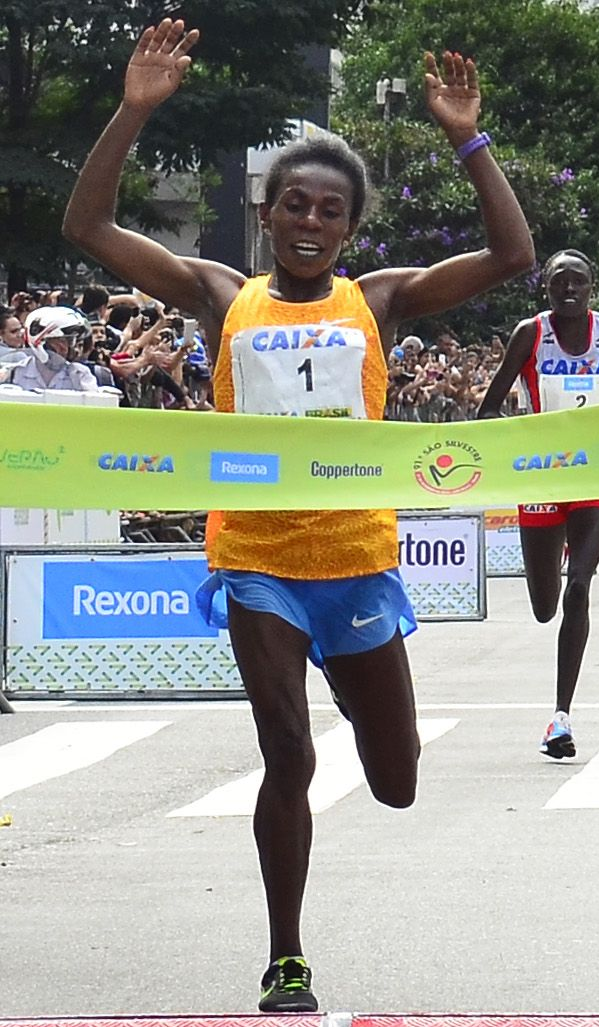
- Yimer Wude Ayalew at the Corrida Internacional de São Silvestre in 2015

Personal information
- Born: 4 July 1987 (age 39) Gojjam, Amhara Region, Ethiopia
Medal record
Women's athletics
Representing Ethiopia
World Championships
Bronze medal – third place	2009 Berlin	10,000 m
All-Africa Games
Silver medal – second place	2011 Maputo	10,000 m
African Championships
Bronze medal – third place	2008 Addis Ababa	10,000 m

Wude Ayalew Yimer (Amharic: ውዴ ፡ አያሌው ፡ ይመር; born 4 July 1987) is an Ethiopian professional long-distance runner. She was the bronze medallist over 10,000 metres at the 2009 World Championships in Athletics and took the silver in that event at the 2011 All-Africa Games. Her sister Hiwot Ayalew is also a top level runner.

At the 2006 World Cross Country Championships she finished fifth in the long race, while the Ethiopian team, of which Yimer was a part, won the team competition. She finished fifth in 5000 metres at the 2006 World Junior Championships. She closed the season by winning the Cross Internacional de Venta de Baños race by over 25 seconds.

At the 2009 World Championships in Athletics in Berlin she won the bronze medal in the 10,000 metres race. At the 2010 World 10K Bangalore in May, she set a new course record of 31:58 after beating the defending champion Aselefech Mergia in the final stretch.

She took part in the Beach to Beacon race in Cape Elizabeth, Maine in August and was the runner-up behind Lineth Chepkurui. She traded positions with the Kenyan at the Falmouth Road Race eight days later, edging out a win over the seven-mile course with a time of 35:46. At the Delhi Half Marathon, she finished in third place for a second consecutive podium finish in two years at the event.

At the 2011 IAAF World Cross Country Championships, she placed sixth and helped the Ethiopian women to the team silver medal alongside Meselech Melkamu. She did not make the World Championships team, but was selected for the 2011 All-Africa Games, where she was second to Sule Utura by a fraction of a second. She ended the year with a close runner-up finish behind Priscah Jeptoo at the Saint Silvester Road Race. She reached the podium at the Cross de Itálica in January 2012, taking third place behind Linet Masai and Vivian Cheruiyot, then won the Elgoibar Cross Country a week later. She won the Saint Silvester Road Race in 2014, ending a 5-year streak by Kenyan women.

== Personal bests ==
- 3000 metres - 8:30.93 min (2009)
- 5000 metres - 14:38.44 min (2009)
- 10,000 metres - 30:11.87 min (2009)
