= Portugal at the 2009 World Championships in Athletics =

- WA code: POR
- National federation: Federação Portuguesa de Atletismo
- Website: www.fpatletismo.pt

in Berlin
- Competitors: 30 (17 men, 13 women)
- Medals: Gold 0 Silver 1 Bronze 0 Total 1

World Championships in Athletics appearances
- 1980; 1983; 1987; 1991; 1993; 1995; 1997; 1999; 2001; 2003; 2005; 2007; 2009; 2011; 2013; 2015; 2017; 2019; 2022; 2023; 2025

Portugal was represented at the 2009 World Championships in Athletics, held in Berlin from August 15 to August 23, with a delegation of 30 athletes (17 men and 13 women). This delegation matched the record for the biggest national team at the World Championships in Athletics, set at Athens 1997. The team included reigning Olympic and 2007 world triple jump champion Nelson Évora, reigning world indoor champion in the long jump Naide Gomes, and Olympic and World Championships medalist Rui Silva. Veteran race walker and 2005 bronze medalist Susana Feitor accomplished her 10th consecutive appearance at the World Championships. Francis Obikwelu came out of retirement to compete with the 4 × 100 metres relay team.

== Results ==
=== Men ===
Track and road events

Event	Athlete	Heats			Quarter-final			Semi-final			Final	
Event	Athlete	Result	Rank	Overall	Result	Rank	Overall	Result	Rank	Overall	Result	Rank
100 m	Arnaldo Abrantes	10.41	2 Q	37	10.40	6	34	did not advance				
200 m	Arnaldo Abrantes	did not start										
1500 m	Rui Silva	3:41.98	4 Q	14	N/A			3:41.30	11	23	did not advance	
10,000 m	Rui Pedro Silva	N/A									28:51.40	23
Marathon	Luís Feiteira	N/A									2:14:06	10
Marathon	Fernando Silva	N/A									2:14:48	13
Marathon	José Moreira	N/A									2:14:05	9
3000 m steeplechase	Alberto Paulo	8:43.13	11	30	N/A						did not advance	
20 km race walk	João Vieira	N/A									1:21:43	10
20 km race walk	Sérgio Vieira	N/A									1:24:32	27
50 km race walk	António Pereira	N/A									did not finish	
50 km race walk	Augusto Cardoso	N/A									3:59:10	23
4 × 100 m relay	Arnaldo Abrantes; Francis Obikwelu; Dany Gonçalves; João Ferreira; Ricardo Monteiro	39.25	4	11	N/A						did not advance	

Field and combined events

Event	Athletes	Qualification			Final	
Event	Athletes	Result	Rank	Overall	Result	Rank
Triple jump	Nelson Évora	17.44	1 Q	1	17.55	Silver medal
Shot put	Marco Fortes	19.81	6	18	did not advance	

=== Women ===
Track and road events

Event	Athlete	Heats			Quarter-final			Semi-final			Final	
Event	Athlete	Result	Rank	Overall	Result	Rank	Overall	Result	Rank	Overall	Result	Rank
100 m	Sónia Tavares	11.64	4 q	32	11.55	8		did not advance				
5000 m	Ana Dulce Félix	did not participate										
5000 m	Inês Monteiro	did not participate										
5000 m	Sara Moreira	15:19.93	5 Q	10	N/A						15:12.22	10
10,000 m	Ana Dias	N/A									31:49.91	16
10,000 m	Ana Dulce Félix	N/A									31:30.90	13
10,000 m	Inês Monteiro	N/A									31:25.67	10
Marathon	Marisa Barros	N/A									2:26:50	6
3000 m steeplechase	Jéssica Augusto	9:26.64	6 q	7	N/A						9:25.25	11
3000 m steeplechase	Sara Moreira	9:28.64	6	12	N/A						did not advance	
20 km race walk	Susana Feitor	N/A									1:32:42	10
20 km race walk	Inês Henriques	N/A									1:32:51	11
20 km race walk	Vera Santos	N/A									1:30:35	5

Field and combined events

Event	Athlete	Qualification			Final	
Event	Athlete	Result	Rank	Overall	Result	Rank
Pole vault	Sandra Tavares	4.25	12	26	did not advance	
Long jump	Naide Gomes	6.86	1 Q	1	6.77	4
Hammer throw	Vânia Silva	62.86	18	37	did not advance	
