= Spain at the 2009 World Championships in Athletics =

- WA code: ESP
- National federation: Real Federación Española de Atletismo
- Website: www.rfea.es

in Berlin
- Competitors: 51 (35 men 16 women)
- Medals: Gold 1 Silver 0 Bronze 1 Total 2

World Championships in Athletics appearances (overview)
- 1976; 1980; 1983; 1987; 1991; 1993; 1995; 1997; 1999; 2001; 2003; 2005; 2007; 2009; 2011; 2013; 2015; 2017; 2019; 2022; 2023; 2025

Spain competed at the 2009 World Championships in Athletics from 15–23 August. A team of 51 athletes, 36 men and 16 women, was announced in preparation for the competition. Selected athletes have achieved one of the competition's qualifying standards. Included in the squad are 2007 World Championships race walk medallists Paquillo Fernández and María Vasco. Marta Domínguez, a 3000 metres steeplechase specialist, entered the competition as the world leader in her event.

== Team selection ==
Track and road events

Event	Athletes	
Event	Men	Women
100 metres	Ángel David Rodríguez	
200 metres	Ángel David Rodríguez	
800 metres	Manuel Olmedo; Luis Alberto Marco	Mayte Martínez
1500 metres	Reyes Estévez; Juan Carlos Higuero; Arturo Casado	Natalia Rodríguez; Nuria Fernández; Iris Fuentes-Pila
5000 metres	Alemayehu Bezabeh; Jesús España; Sergio Sánchez	Judit Plá
10,000 metres	Carlos Castillejo; Ayad Lamdassem; Manuel Penas	
Marathon	José Manuel Martínez; Rafael Iglesias; Pedro Nimo	Alessandra Aguilar
100 metres hurdles	Jackson Quiñónez; Felipe Vivancos	—
400 metres hurdles		Laia Forcadell
3000 m steeplechase	José Luis Blanco; Eliseo Martín; Ángel Mullera	Marta Domínguez; Eva Arias; Diana Martín
20 km race walk	Paquillo Fernández; Juan Manuel Molina; José Ignacio Díaz	María Vasco; Beatriz Pascual
50 km race walk	Jesús Ángel García Bragado; Mikel Odriozola; Alejandro Cambil	—

Field and combined events

Event	Athletes	
Event	Men	Women
Pole vault		Naroa Agirre
High jump	Javier Bermejo	Ruth Beitia
Long jump	Luis Felipe Méliz	
Triple jump	Andrés Capellán	
Shot put	Manuel Martínez; Borja Vivas	
Discus throw	Mario Pestano; Frank Casañas	
Hammer throw	Javier Cienfuegos	Berta Castells
Javelin throw		Mercedes Chilla
Decathlon	Agustín Félix	—

== Results ==
=== Men ===
Track and road events

Event	Athletes	Heat Round 1		Heat Round 2		Semifinal		Final	
Event	Athletes	Result	Rank	Result	Rank	Result	Rank	Result	Rank
100 m	Ángel Rodríguez	10.39 SB	34 q	10.39	32	did not advance			
200 m	Ángel Rodríguez	21.37	45	did not advance					
800 m	Manuel Olmedo	DNF		did not advance					
800 m	Luis Alberto Marco	1:48.47	39	did not advance					
1500 m	Reyes Estévez	3:38.23SB	6 q	-		3:37.55SB	15	did not advance	
1500 m	Juan Carlos Higuero	3:41.77	13 Q	-		3:37.33	14	did not advance	
1500 m	Arturo Casado	3:43.21	25	did not advance					
5000 m	Alemayehu Bezabeh	13:33.52	22	-				did not advance	
5000 m	Jesús España	13:20.40	5 Q	-					
5000 m	Sergio Sánchez	13:53.51	30	-				did not advance	
10,000 m	Carlos Castillejo	-						28:09.89	15
10,000 m	Ayad Lamdassem	-						DNF	
10,000 m	Manuel Penas	-						DNF	
110 m hurdles	Jackson Quiñónez	13.63	21 Q	-		13.54	18	did not advance	
110 m hurdles	Felipe Vivancos	13.72	30	-		did not advance			
3000 m steeplechase	José Luis Blanco	8:24.07	14	-				did not advance	
3000 m steeplechase	Eliseo Martín	8:24.29	16 Q	-				8:16.51 SB	9
3000 m steeplechase	Ángel Mullera	8:47.40	33	-				did not advance	
Marathon	José Manuel Martínez	-							
Marathon	Rafael Iglesias	-							
Marathon	Pedro Nimo	-							
20 km walk	Paquillo Fernández	-						DNF	
20 km walk	Juan Manuel Molina	-						1:24.00	24
20 km walk	José Ignacio Díaz	-						1:22.12 SB	16
50 km walk	Jesús Ángel García Bragado	-						3:41.37 SB	Bronze medal
50 km walk	Mikel Odriozola	-						4:00.54	26
50 km walk	Alejandro Cambil	-						4:13.14	29

Field events

Event	Athletes	Qualification		Final	
Event	Athletes	Result	Rank	Result	Rank
Long jump	Luis Felipe Méliz	7.87 SB	25	did not advance	
Triple jump	Andrés Capellán	15.80	42	did not advance	
High jump	Javier Bermejo	2.20	22	did not advance	
Shot put	Manuel Martínez	19.80	19	did not advance	
Shot put	Borja Vivas	18.38	33	did not advance	
Discus throw	Mario Pestano	65.03	7 Q	62.76	10
Discus throw	Frank Casañas	61.10	16	did not advance	
Hammer throw	Javier Cienfuegos	72.01	24	did not advance	
Decathlon	Agustín Félix	-		7,539	32

=== Women ===
Track and road events

Event	Athletes	Heat Round 1		Heat Round 2		Semifinal		Final	
Event	Athletes	Result	Rank	Result	Rank	Result	Rank	Result	Rank
800 m	Mayte Martínez	2:03.39	18 Q	-		1:59.72 SB	6 q	1:58.81 SB	7
1500 m	Natalia Rodríguez	4:07.84	2 Q	-					
1500 m	Nuria Fernández	4:08.79	15 Q	-					
1500 m	Iris Fuentes-Pila	4:09.71	24 q	-					
5000 m	Judit Plá	15:54.32	19	-				did not advance	
400 m hurdles	Laia Forcadell	58.57	32	did not advance					
3000 m steeplechase	Marta Domínguez	9:34.78	18 Q	-				9:07.32 WL NR	1st place, gold medalist(s)
3000 m steeplechase	Eva Arias	9:25.14 PB	5 q	-				9:33.34	14
3000 m steeplechase	Diana Martín	9:42.39 PB	26	did not advance					
Marathon	Alessandra Aguilar	-							
20 km walk	María Vasco	-						DNF	
20 km walk	Beatriz Pascual	-						1:30:40	6

Field and combined events

Event	Athletes	Qualification		Final	
Event	Athletes	Result	Rank	Result	Rank
High jump	Ruth Beitia	1.95	4 Q	1.99	5
Pole vault	Naroa Agirre	4.40 SB	21	did not advance	
Javelin throw	Mercedes Chilla	56.68	19	did not advance	
Hammer throw	Berta Castells	67.32	22	did not advance	
