= Yurika Nakamura (runner) =

Japanese long-distance runner

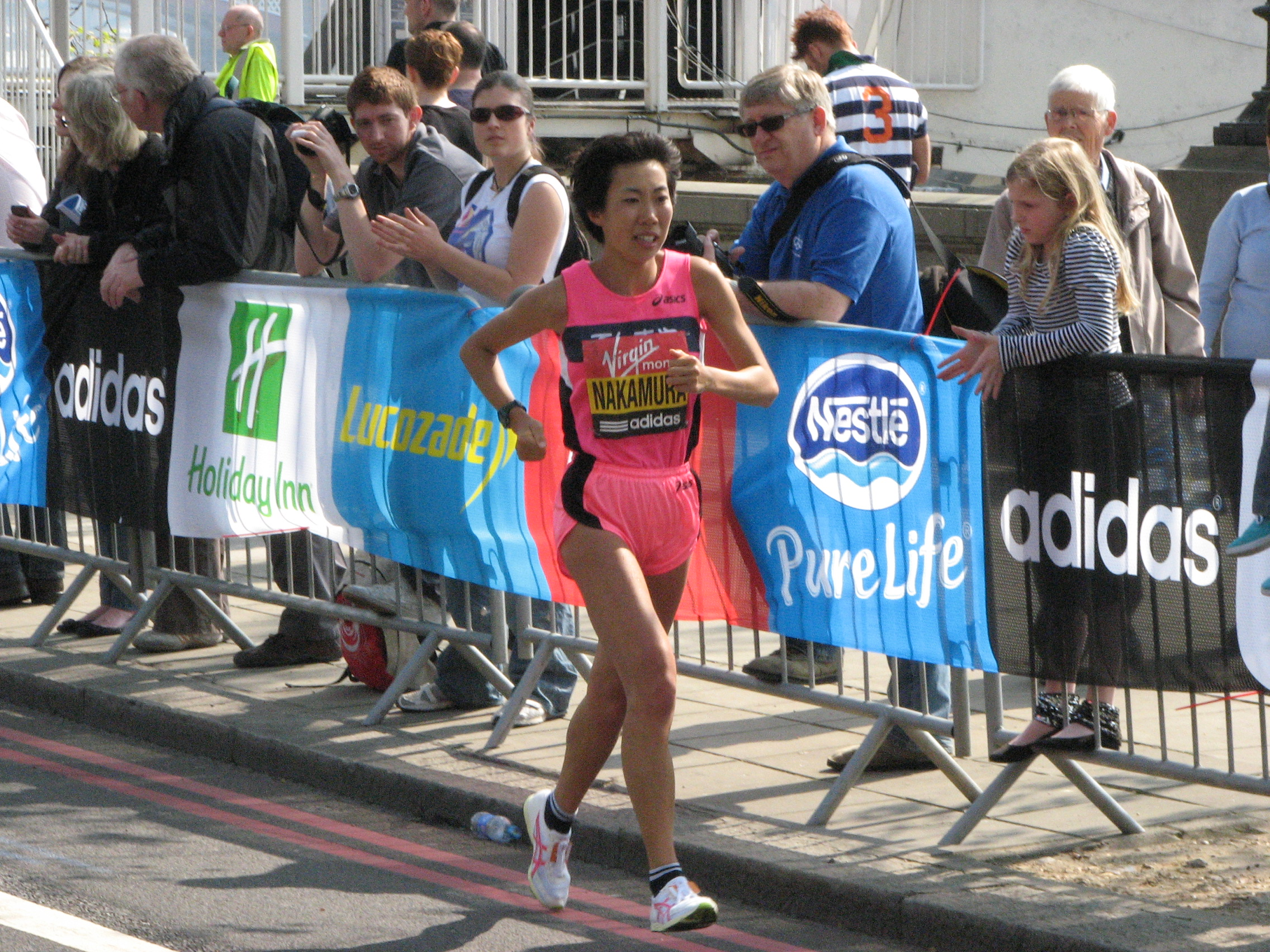
Yurika Nakamura at the London Marathon in 2011

Yurika Nakamura (中村 友梨香, Nakamura Yurika) (born 1 April 1986 in Fukuchiyama) is a Japanese long-distance runner. Nakamura grew up in the Hyōgo Prefecture.

She finished seventh at the 2006 World Road Running Championships, helping the Japanese team win the bronze medal in the team competition. In 2008, she won the Nagoya Marathon in her marathon debut. In the 2008 Summer Olympics marathon, she finished 13th. She won the 2009 Sapporo Half Marathon title with a time of 1:09:20.

== Achievements ==
- All results regarding marathon, unless stated otherwise

Year	Competition	Venue	Position	Notes
Representing Japan
2008	Nagoya Marathon	Nagoya, Japan	1st	2:25:51
2008	Olympic Games	Beijing, PR China	13th	2:30:19
2010	Boston Marathon	Boston, United States	7th	2:30:40

== Personal bests ==
- 3000 metres – 9:28.53 min (2002)
- 5000 metres – 15:13.01 min (2009)
- 10,000 metres – 31:14.39 min (2009)
- Half marathon - 1:09:20 hrs (2009)
- Marathon - 2:25:51 hrs (2008)
