= Russia at the 2009 World Championships in Athletics =

- WA code: RUS
- National federation: All-Russia Athletic Federation
- Website: eng.rusathletics.com

in Berlin
- Medals: Gold 4 Silver 3 Bronze 6 Total 13

World Championships in Athletics appearances (overview)
- 1993; 1995; 1997; 1999; 2001; 2003; 2005; 2007; 2009; 2011; 2013; 2015; 2017–2025

Other related appearances
- Authorised Neutral Athletes (2017–pres.)

Russia competes at the 2009 World Championships in Athletics from 15–23 August. A team of over 100 athletes was announced in preparation for the competition, one of the largest squads in the competition. Selected athletes have achieved one of the competition's qualifying standards. Yelena Isinbayeva, Tatyana Lebedeva, Yekaterina Volkova, and Olga Kaniskina are the defending champions in their respective events. The 2008 Olympic champion Valeriy Borchin, and world record holder Gulnara Galkina-Samitova, are also competing. Russia will be represented in all the women's events, and furthermore, only five men's events will not feature a Russian competitor.

== Team selection ==
Track and road events

Event	Athletes	
Event	Men	Women
100 metres		Yevgeniya Polyakova; Anna Geflikh
200 metres	Roman Smirnov	Yuliya Gushchina; Yelena Bolsun; Olga Zaitseva
400 metres	Maksim Dyldin	Antonina Krivoshapka; Anastasiya Kapachinskaya; Lyudmila Litvinova
800 metres	Yuriy Borzakovskiy	Mariya Savinova; Svetlana Klyuka; Elena Kofanova
1500 metres		Anna Alminova; Natalya Yevdokimova; Oksana Zbrozhek
5000 metres		Elizaveta Grechishnikova; Natalya Popova
10,000 metres	Anatoliy Rybakov	Liliya Shobukhova; Mariya Konovalova; Kseniya Agafonova
Marathon	Oleg Kulkov; Yuriy Abramov; Sergei Rybin; Mikhail Limaev	Svetlana Zakharova; Nailiya Yulamanova; Olga Glok; Alevtina Biktimirova; Lyubov Morgunova
100 metres hurdles	—	Yuliya Kondakova; Tatyana Dektiareva; Yekaterina Shtepa
110 metres hurdles		—
400 metres hurdles	Aleksandr Dereviagin	Yuliya Pechonkina; Natalya Antyukh; Yelena Churakova; Natalya Ivanova (reserve)
3000 m steeplechase	Ildar Minshin	Yekaterina Volkova; Gulnara Galkina-Samitova; Yuliya Zarudneva; Yelena Sidorchenkova
20 km race walk	Valeriy Borchin; Petr Trofimov; Andrey Krivov	Olga Kaniskina; Anisiya Kirdiapkina; Vera Sokolova; Larisa Emelianova
50 km race walk	Denis Nizhegorodov; Sergey Kirdiapkin; Yuriy Andronov	—
4×100 metres relay		Yevgeniya Polyakova; Yuliya Gushchina; Natalya Rusakova; Yuliya Chermoshanskaya; Aleksandra Fedoriva
4×400 metres relay	Maksim Dyldin; Konstantin Svechkar; Valentin Krugliakov; Anton Kokorin	Antonina Krivoshapka; Anastasiya Kapachinskaya; Lyudmila Litvinova; Natalya Nazarova; Tatyana Firova; Natalya Antyukh

Field and combined events

Event	Athletes	
Event	Men	Women
Pole vault	Viktor Chistiakov; Aleksandr Gripich; Igor Pavlov	Yelena Isinbayeva; Yuliya Golubchikova; Aleksandra Kiryashova; Tatyana Polnova
High jump	Ivan Ukhov; Yaroslav Rybakov; Andrei Tereshin	Anna Chicherova; Yelena Slesarenko; Svetlana Shkolina
Long jump	Aleksandr Menkov	Tatyana Lebedeva; Yelena Sokolova; Irina Meleshina; Olga Kucherenko
Triple jump	Igor Spasovkhodskiy; Yevgeniy Plotnir	Tatyana Lebedeva; Nadezhda Alekhina; Anna Pyatykh
Shot put	Maksim Sidorov; Pavel Sofin; Valeriy Kokoev	Anna Avdeeva
Discus throw	Bogdan Pishchalnikov; Nikolay Sedyuk	Natalya Sadova; Svetlana Saikina
Hammer throw	Aleksey Zagorniy	Tatyana Lysenko
Javelin throw	Sergei Makarov; Ilya Korotkov; Aleksandr Ivanov	Valeriya Zabruskova; Maria Abakumova
Heptathlon	—	Tatyana Chernova
Decathlon	Aleksei Sysoev; Aleksandr Pogorelov; Vasiliy Kharlamov	—
