= Doping at the World Athletics Championships =

As a signatory to the World Anti-Doping Code, the International Association of Athletics Federations (IAAF) prohibits the use of banned performance-enhancing substances by competitors at the World Championships in Athletics. A list of WADA-banned substances is regularly published to the public and amended as scientific knowledge expands. The IAAF and anti-doping bodies undertake in-competition sampling of athletes blood and urine in order to detect where athletes have taken banned substances. This is also complemented by out-of-competition tests during the tournament and in the preceding period.

Where a banned substance is detected in-competition the athlete's performance will be annulled and—depending on the severity of the infraction—the athlete may be banned from the sport for a set period. Where an out-of-competition sample tests positive for a banned substance, any performances by the athlete after that date may also be annulled. Athletes may also be banned via doping regulations if the athlete fails to submit to testing, tampers or interferes with the undertaking of anti-doping procedures, or is found in possession of banned substances. Where a performance is annulled, any medals won by the athlete will be stripped from the athlete and the IAAF may decided to reallocate the medal(s) to the next best performers. This includes disqualification of whole national relay teams should one member break anti-doping rules. Samples are stored for future retesting, as improved methods over time may lead to previously unidentified cases of doping. The IAAF began a long-term storage approach from the 2007 World Championships onwards.

A total of 162 athletes (69 men and 93 women) have had their results annulled at the World Championships, and 40 of these have been stripped of medals as a result. A total of 53 medals have been stripped as a result of doping infractions. The first doping failure pre-dates the main championships and comes from Spanish hurdler Rosa Colorado at the 1980 World Championships in Athletics – an event which only featured two women's events not on the Olympic programme. World champions to be banned include North American sprinters Ben Johnson, Marion Jones, Tim Montgomery and Kelli White. Other prominent champions to have been banned include Russian middle-distance runner Mariya Savinova, steeplechaser Yuliya Zaripova and racewalker Olga Kaniskina. The majority of stripped medallists have come from Russia.

There has been an upward trend in the number of doping violations at the championships, with a peak of 50 athletes having had their performances annulled at the 2011 event, though it is assumed that this reflects improved detection rather than increased overall doping – an anonymous survey at that championships revealed over 30% of athletes had used banned substances during their career.

Given the susceptibility of the sport of athletics to doping issues, the IAAF has been central in the development of anti-doping standards and anti-doping measures have been were present at World Championships since the first edition in 1983. The anti-doping approach had a new development at the 2017 World Championships in Athletics, where all Russian athletes were banned due to state-sponsored doping and had to request dispensation to compete at Authorised Neutral Athletes.

== Disqualifications by year ==
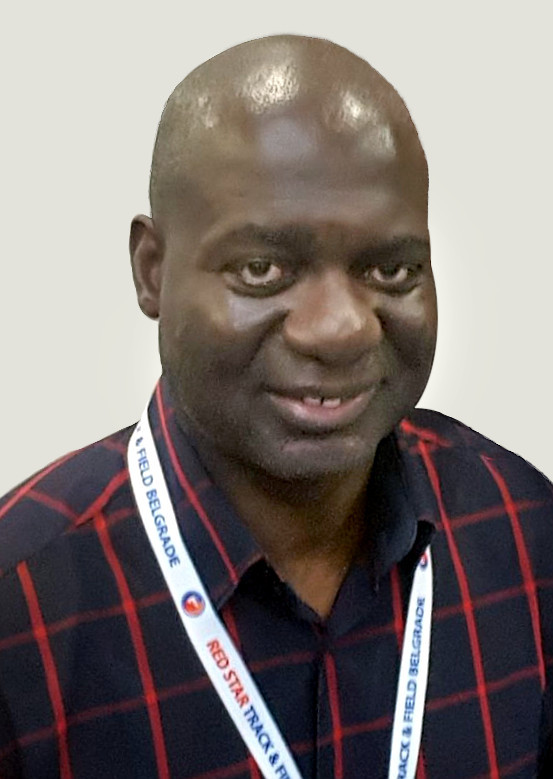
Ben Johnson's disqualification in 1987 was the first time a world champion was stripped of their title for doping.

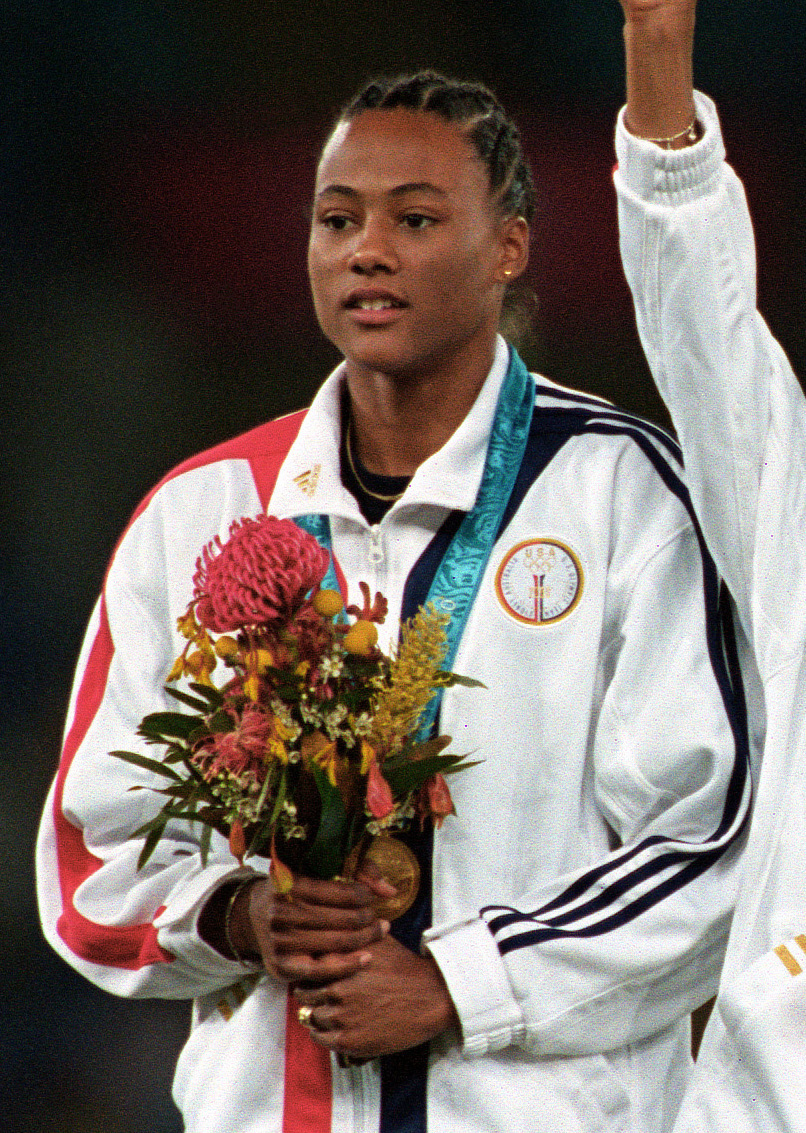
Marion Jones was stripped of three sprint medals for doping at the 2001 event

.

Edition	Year	Host city	Host country	Athletes disqualified	Medals stripped
-	1976	Malmö	Sweden	0	0
-	1980	Sittard	Netherlands	1	0
1st	1983	Helsinki	Finland	0	0
2nd	1987	Rome	Italy	3	2
3rd	1991	Tokyo	Japan	3	1
4th	1993	Stuttgart	Germany	4	2
5th	1995	Gothenburg	Sweden	0	0
6th	1997	Athens	Greece	7	3
7th	1999	Seville	Spain	7	3
8th	2001	Edmonton	Canada	17	9
9th	2003	Saint-Denis	France	11	6
10th	2005	Helsinki	Finland	11	4
11th	2007	Osaka	Japan	9	5
12th	2009	Berlin	Germany	31	5
13th	2011	Daegu	South Korea	50	10
14th	2013	Moscow	Russia	21	3
15th	2015	Beijing	China	7	0
16th	2017	London	United Kingdom	3	0
17th	2019	Doha	Qatar		
18th	2021	Eugene	United States		

== Disqualifications by nation ==
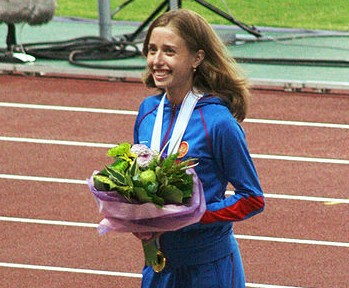
Three-time racewalk world champion Olga Kaniskina of Russia has been stripped of two of those titles for doping.

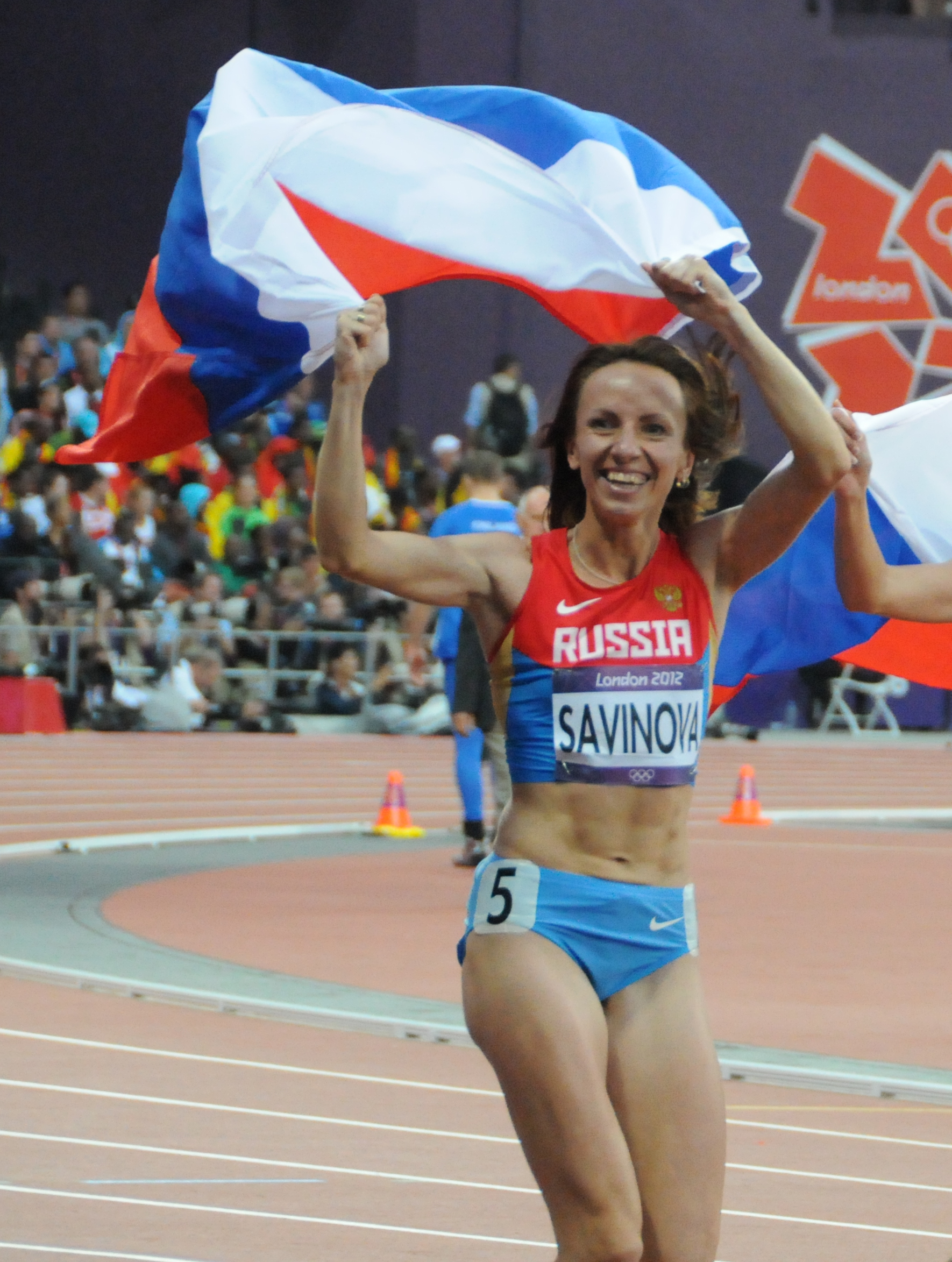
Mariya Savinova is one of many Russian athletes to be stripped for World Championships medals.

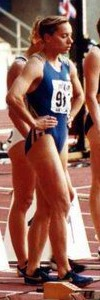
Zhanna Pintusevich-Block is one of two Ukrainians to be stripped of medals for doping at the event.

This table collates the total number of athletes who have been disqualified for doping at the championships by nation. Athletes with multiple disqualifications are counted as one. Where a relay team is disqualified, this is counted as one disqualification, though multiple team members may have been sanctioned.

Last updated 17 March 2018

Nation	Men disqualified	Women disqualified	Total	Medals stripped
Russia^{[nb1]}	14	38	52	24
Ukraine	4	10	14	2
United States	8	5	13	14
Morocco	8	3	11	0
Turkey	0	8	8	1
Belarus	4	3	7	4
Nigeria	2	4	6	1
Spain	3	2	5	1
France	4	0	4	0
Canada	1	2	3	1
Saudi Arabia	3	0	3	0
Greece	0	2	2	1
Kenya	0	2	2	0
Kazakhstan	0	2	2	0
Afghanistan	1	0	1	0
Algeria	1	0	1	1
Australia	1	0	1	0
Bahrain	0	1	1	0
Belgium	1	0	1	0
Brazil	1	0	1	0
Bulgaria	0	1	1	0
Cuba	1	0	1	0
Great Britain & N.I.	1	0	1	1
Guatemala	1	0	1	0
Hungary	1	0	1	0
India	0	1	1	0
Iran	1	0	1	0
Italy	1	0	1	0
South Korea	1	0	1	0
Liberia	1	0	1	0
Lithuania	1	0	1	0
Moldova	0	1	1	0
Malaysia	1	1	1	0
Norway	1	0	1	1
Portugal	0	1	1	0
Romania	0	1	1	0
Somalia	1	0	1	0
Soviet Union	0	1	1	0
Switzerland	0	1	1	1
Trinidad and Tobago	0	1	1	0
Turkmenistan	0	1	1	0
Uzbekistan	1	0	1	1
Venezuela	0	1	1	0

- ^{nb1} Russia's total for women's disqualifications and stripped medals includes the performances of Nailya Yulamanova, who helped Russia secure a bronze medal at the 2009 World Marathon Cup (held in conjunction with the 2009 World Championships marathon) but was later banned and had her team's performance annulled.

== Disqualifications by event ==
This table collates the total number of disqualifications within a given event. Where the same athlete has been disqualified at multiple editions of the championships, each athlete disqualified per year is counted. Last updated 17 March 2018

Event	Male disqualifications	Female disqualifications	Total
100 metres	8	11	19
200 metres	2	10	12
400 metres	7	9	16
800 metres	0	11	11
1500 metres	4	14	18
5000 metres	6	4	10
10,000 metres	0	2	2
Sprint hurdles	1	2	3
400 metres hurdles	2	3	5
3000 metres s'chase	2	8	10
4 × 100 metres relay	7	7	14
4 × 400 metres relay	5	7	12
Marathon	9	4	13
20 km walk^{[nb2]}	7	6	13
50 km walk	5	0	5
High jump	1	2	3
Pole vault	1	0	1
Long jump	0	3	3
Triple jump	1	2	3
Shot put	11	4	12
Discus throw	2	5	7
Javelin throw	2	1	3
Hammer throw	4	6	10
Combined events	0	1	1

- ^{nb2} Includes precursor women's walk event over 10,000 m

== Disqualified athletes ==
Athlete	Nation	Sex	Event	Year(s)	Result	Notes
Rosa Colorado	Spain	Women	400 m hurdles	1980	1st	Ran in B-final
Ben Johnson	Canada	Men	100 m 4 × 100 m relay	1987	1st place, gold medalist(s)	4th place Canadian relay team disqualified
Sandra Gasser	Switzerland	Women	1500 m	1987	3rd place, bronze medalist(s)	
Angella Issajenko	Canada	Women	100 m 4 × 100 m relay	1987	5th	6th place Canadian relay team disqualified
Georg Andersen	Norway	Men	Shot put	1991	2nd place, silver medalist(s)	
Delisa Walton-Floyd	United States	Women	800 m	1991	8th (semis)	
Irina Slyusar	Soviet Union	Women	100 m	1991	6th (semis)	
Dmitriy Polyunin	Uzbekistan	Men	Javelin throw	1993	3rd place, bronze medalist(s)	
Mike Stulce	United States	Men	Shot put	1993	3rd place, bronze medalist(s)	
Romas Ubartas	Lithuania	Men	Discus throw	1993	4th	
Liliya Nurutdinova	Russia	Women	800 m	1993	7th	
Aleksandr Bagach	Ukraine	Men	Shot put	1997	1st place, gold medalist(s)	
Pascal Maran	France	Men	400 m hurdles	1997	6th (heats)	
Antonio Pettigrew	United States	Men	400 m 4 × 400 m relay	1997 1999 2001	7th (1997) 5th (1999) 4th (2001)	1997, 1999 and 2001 gold medal-winning American relay teams disqualified. Disqualified at three editions.
Daniel Plaza	Spain	Men	20 kilometres walk	1997	10th	
Olimpiada Ivanova	Russia	Women	10,000 m walk	1997	2nd place, silver medalist(s)	
Lyubov Tsyoma	Russia	Women	800 m	1997	DNF (semis)	
Oksana Zelinskaya	Kazakhstan	Women	Triple jump	1997	15th (q)	
Mohamed Ibrahim Aden	Somalia	Men	1500 m	1999	6th (semis)	
Innocent Asonze	Nigeria	Men	100 m 4 × 100 m relay	1999	4th (q-finals)	Bronze medal-winning Nigerian relay team disqualified
Davidson Ezinwa	Nigeria	Men	100 m	1999	7th (semis)	
German Skurygin	Russia	Men	50 kilometres walk	1999	1st place, gold medalist(s)	
Jerome Young	United States	Men	400 m 4 × 400 m relay	1999 2001 2003	4th (1999) 4th (semis, 2001) (gold)	2001 and 2003 gold medal-winning American relay teams disqualified. Disqualified at three editions
Hannah Cooper	Liberia	Women	4 × 400 m relay	1999	6th (h)	Liberian relay team disqualified
Roberto Barbi	Italy	Men	Marathon	2001	60th	
Christophe Cheval	France	Men	200 m 4 × 100 m relay	2001	7th (q-finals)	French relay team disqualified
Ramon Clay	United States	Men	200 m	2001	8th (q-finals)	
Andrei Mikhnevich	Belarus	Men	Shot put	2001 2005 2007 2009 2011	10th (2001) 5th (2005) (bronze) (2007) 7th (2009) (bronze) (2011)	Banned for life, disqualified at five editions
Tim Montgomery	United States	Men	100 m 4 × 100 m relay	2001 2003	(silver) (2001) 5th (2003)	2001 Gold medal-winning American relay team disqualified. Disqualified at two editions
Ali Saïdi-Sief	Algeria	Men	5000 m	2001	2nd place, silver medalist(s)	
Javier Sotomayor	Cuba	Men	High jump	2001	4th	
Venolyn Clarke	Canada	Women	100 m	2001	8th (q-finals)	
Marion Jones	United States	Women	100 m 200 m 4 × 100 m relay	2001	2nd place, silver medalist(s) 1st place, gold medalist(s)	2001 gold medal-winning American relay team disqualified
Svetlana Laukhova	Russia	Women	100 m hurdles	2001	5th (heats)	
Yekaterina Leshchova	Russia	Women	200 m	2001	6th (heats)	
Natalya Sadova	Russia	Women	Discus throw	2001	1st place, gold medalist(s)	
Natalya Sologub	Belarus	Women	400 m	2001	5th (semis)	
Ana Mirela Termure	Romania	Women	Javelin throw	2001	10th (q)	
Kelli White	United States	Women	100 m 200 m 4 × 100 m relay	2001 2003	7th (100 m, 2001) (bronze) (200 m, 2001) (gold) (100 m, 2003) (gold) (200 m, 2003)	2001 gold medal-winning American relay team disqualified. Disqualified at two editions.
Dwain Chambers	Great Britain & N.I.	Men	100 m 4 × 100 m relay	2003	4th	Silver medal-winning British relay team disqualified
Fouad Chouki	France	Men	1500 m	2003	8th	
Calvin Harrison	United States	Men	400 m 4 × 400 m relay	2003	6th	Gold medal-winning American relay team disqualified
Chris Phillips	United States	Men	110 m hurdles	2003	5th	
Kevin Toth	United States	Men	Shot put	2003	4th	
Zhanna Block	Ukraine	Women	100 m 200 m	2003 2005	(bronze) (100 m, 2003) 4th (200 m, 2003), 5th (200 m semis, 2005)	Disqualified at two editions
Regina Jacobs	United States	Women	1500 m	2003	6th (semis)	
Melissa Price	United States	Women	Hammer throw	2003	12th	
Yuriy Belonog	Ukraine	Men	Shot put	2005	4th	
Vladyslav Piskunov	Ukraine	Men	Hammer throw	2005	12th	
Ivan Tikhon	Belarus	Men	Hammer throw	2005	1st place, gold medalist(s)	
Andrei Varantsou	Belarus	Men	Hammer throw	2005	15th (q)	
Neelam Jaswant Singh	India	Women	Discus throw	2005	9th (q)	
Svetlana Krivelyova	Russia	Women	Shot put	2005	4th	
Tatyana Kotova	Russia	Women	Long jump	2005	2nd place, silver medalist(s)	
Olga Kuzenkova	Russia	Women	Hammer throw	2005	1st place, gold medalist(s)	
Nadzeya Ostapchuk	Belarus	Women	Shot put	2005	1st place, gold medalist(s)	
Naman Keïta	France	Men	400 m hurdles	2007	4th (semis)	
Elvan Abeylegesse	Turkey	Women	5000 m 10,000 m	2007 2009	5th (5000 m, 2007) (silver) (10,000 m, 2007) DQ (10,000 m, 2009)	Disqualified at two editions
Svetlana Cherkasova	Russia	Women	800 m	2007	6th (h)	
Yuliya Fomenko	Russia	Women	1500 m	2007	7th	
Hrisopiyí Devetzí	Greece	Women	Triple jump	2007	3rd place, bronze medalist(s)	
Gulfiya Khanafeyeva	Russia	Women	Hammer throw	2007	10th	
Darya Pishchalnikova	Russia	Women	Discus throw	2007	2nd place, silver medalist(s)	
Yelena Soboleva	Russia	Women	1500 m	2007	2nd place, silver medalist(s)	
Hussain Al-Hamdah	Saudi Arabia	Men	5000 m	2009 2011	12th (h, 2009) 13th (2001	Disqualified at two editions
Valeriy Borchin	Russia	Men	20 kilometres walk	2009 2011	(gold) (2009) (gold) (2011)	Disqualified at two editions
Jamel Chatbi	Morocco	Men	3000 m steeplechase	2009	DNS (final)	
Leonardo dos Santos	Brazil	Men	Triple jump	2009	20th (q)	
Abderrahim Goumri	Morocco	Men	Marathon	2009 2011	DNF DNF	Disqualified at two editions
Sergey Kirdyapkin	Russia	Men	50 kilometres walk	2009 2011	(gold) (2009) DNF (2011)	Disqualified at two editions
Mikhail Lemayev	Russia	Men	Marathon	2009	45th	
Ildar Minshin	Russia	Men	3000 m steeplechase	2009	7th	
Kevin Rans	Belgium	Men	Pole vault	2009	12th	
Rakia Al-Gasara	Bahrain	Women	100 m 200 m	2009	7th (q-finals) 5th (h)	
Mariem Selsouli	Morocco	Women	1500 m	2009	DNS (final)	
Anna Alminova	Russia	Women	1500 m	2009	10th (semis)	
Olena Antonova	Ukraine	Women	Discus throw	2009	17th (q)	
Toyin Augustus	Nigeria	Women	100 m hurdles 4 × 100 m relay	2009	6th (semis)	Nigerian relay team disqualified
Alemitu Bekele Degfa	Turkey	Women	1500 m 5000 m	2009 2011	11th (1500 m heats, 2009) 13th (5000 m, 2009) 9th (5000 m heats, 2011)	Disqualified at two editions
Yuliya Chermoshanskaya	Russia	Women	4 × 100 m relay	2009	4th	Russian relay team disqualified
Marta Domínguez	Spain	Women	3000 m steeplechase	2009	1st place, gold medalist(s)	
Yelizaveta Grechishnikova	Russia	Women	5000 m	2009 2011	10th (h) 14th	Disqualified at two editions
Olga Kaniskina	Russia	Women	20 kilometres walk	2009 2011	(gold) (2009) (gold) (2011)	Disqualified at two editions
Anastasiya Kapachinskaya	Russia	Women	400 m 4 × 400 m relay	2009 2011	7th (2009) (bronze) (2011)	2009 and 2011 bronze medal-winning Russian relay teams disqualified. Disqualified at two editions
Svetlana Klyuka	Russia	Women	800 m	2009	5th (semis)	
Iríni Kokkinaríou	Greece	Women	3000 m steeplechase	2009 2011	8th (q, 2009) 11th (q, 2011)	Disqualified at two editions
Mariya Konovalova	Russia	Women	10,000 m	2009	11th	
Zalina Petrivskaya	Moldova	Women	Hammer throw	2009 2011	14th (q, 2009) 8th (2011)	Disqualified at two editions
Amaka Ogoegbunam	Nigeria	Women	400 m 400 m hurdles	2009	DNF (semis) DQ (semis)	
Hanane Ouhaddou	Morocco	Women	3000 m steeplechase	2009 2011	5th (h) 8th	Disqualified at two editions
Vita Palamar	Ukraine	Women	High jump	2009	8th (q)	
Tatyana Petlyuk	Ukraine	Women	800 m 4 × 400 m relay	2009 2011	6th (semis) DNF (h)	2009 Russian relay team disqualified. Disqualified at two editions
Nailya Yulamanova	Russia	Women	Marathon	2009	8th	Bronze medal-winning Russian team for the 2009 World Marathon Cup disqualified
Denis Alekseyev	Russia	Men	4 × 400 m relay	2011	4th	Russian relay team disqualified
Ahmed Baday	Morocco	Men	Marathon	2011	27th	
Sergey Bakulin	Russia	Men	50 kilometres walk	2011	1st place, gold medalist(s)	
Abderrahime Bouramdane	Morocco	Men	Marathon	2011	4th	
Zoltán Kovágó	Hungary	Men	Discus throw	2011	7th (q)	
Lim Hee-Nam	South Korea	Men	4 × 100 m relay	2011	5th (h)	South Korean relay team disqualified
Vladimir Kanaykin	Russia	Men	20 kilometres walk	2011	2nd place, silver medalist(s)	
Hadi Md Nor Imran	Malaysia	Men	100 m	2011	7th (q-finals)	
Sergey Morozov	Russia	Men	20 kilometres walk	2011	12th	
Mohamed Othman Shahween	Saudi Arabia	Men	1500 m	2011	DNF (h)	
Stanislav Yemelyanov	Russia	Men	20 kilometres walk	2011	5th	
Igor Yerokhin	Russia	Men	50 kilometres walk	2011		
Aslı Çakır Alptekin	Turkey	Women	1500 m	2011	10th (semis)	
Bahar Doğan	Turkey	Women	Marathon	2011	36th	
Inna Eftimova	Bulgaria	Women	100 m	2011	4th (h)	
Tetyana Gamera	Ukraine	Women	Marathon	2011	15th	
Semoy Hackett	Trinidad and Tobago	Women	100 m 4 × 100 m relay	2011	4th (semis)	4th-placed Trinidad and Tobago relay team disqualified
Norjannah Hafiszah Jamaludin	Malaysia	Women	100 m	2011	6th (q-finals)	
Natallia Kareiva	Belarus	Women	1500 m	2011	6th (h)	
Yekaterina Kostetskaya	Russia	Women	800 m	2011	5th	
Olga Kucherenko	Russia	Women	Long jump	2011 2013	(silver) 5th	Disqualified at two editions
Yekaterina Sharmina	Russia	Women	1500 m	2011 2013	9th (semis) 6th	Disqualified at two editions
Tatyana Mineyeva	Russia	Women	20 kilometres walk	2011	17th	
Sara Moreira	Portugal	Women	3000 m steeplechase	2011	12th	
Semiha Mutlu	Turkey	Women	20 kilometres walk	2011	DNF	
Anna Omorova	Russia	Women	Shot put	2011	10th	
Marielys Rojas	Venezuela	Women	High jump	2011	12th (q)	
Yuliya Stepanova	Russia	Women	800 m	2011	8th	
Pınar Saka	Turkey	Women	400 m 4 × 400 m relay	2011	6th (h)	Turkish relay team disqualified
Mariya Savinova	Russia	Women	800 m	2011 2013	1st place, gold medalist(s) 2nd place, silver medalist(s)	Disqualified at two editions
Anzhelika Shevchenko	Ukraine	Women	1500 m	2011	9th (h)	
Olesya Syreva	Russia	Women	1500 m	2011	9th (semis)	
Nataliya Tobias	Ukraine	Women	1500 m	2011	9th	
Binnaz Uslu	Turkey	Women	3000 m steeplechase	2011	7th	
Antonina Yefremova	Ukraine	Women	400 m 4 × 400 m relay	2011	4th (semis)	Fifth-place Ukrainian relay team disqualified
Lyudmyla Yosypenko	Ukraine	Women	Heptathlon	2011	10th	
Yuliya Zaripova	Russia	Women	3000 m steeplechase	2011	1st place, gold medalist(s)	
Roman Avramenko	Ukraine	Men	Javelin throw	2013	5th	
Massoud Azizi	Afghanistan	Men	100 m	2013	8th (h)	
Hafid Chani	Morocco	Men	Marathon	2013	DNF	
Othmane El Goumri	Morocco	Men	5000 m	2013 2015	7th (h) 13th (h)	Disqualified at two editions
Pavel Kryvitski	Belarus	Men	Hammer throw	2013	9th (q)	
Ebrahim Rahimian	Iran	Men	20 kilometres walk	2013	52nd	
Joshua Ross	Australia	Men	200 m 4 × 100 m relay	2013	7th (h)	Australian relay team disqualified
Jeremias Saloj	Guatemala	Men	Marathon	2013	33rd	
Sergio Sánchez	Spain	Men	5000 m	2013	14th (h)	
Soslan Tsirikhov	Russia	Men	Shot put	2013	13th (q)	
Anna Bulgakova	Russia	Women	Hammer throw	2013	5th	
Yelizaveta Bryzgina	Ukraine	Women	200 m 4 × 100 m relay	2013	5th (semis)	Ukrainian relay team disqualified
Vera Ganeyeva	Russia	Women	Discus throw	2013	7th (q)	
Ümmü Kiraz	Turkey	Women	Marathon	2013	DNF	
Yevgeniya Kolodko	Russia	Women	Shot put	2013	5th	
Ayman Kozhakhmetova	Kazakhstan	Women	20 kilometres walk	2013	27th	
Antonina Krivoshapka	Russia	Women	400 m 4 × 400 m relay	2013	3rd place, bronze medalist(s)	Gold medal-winning Russian relay team disqualified
Yelena Ryabova	Turkmenistan	Women	200 m	2013	6th (h)	
Adil Annani	Morocco	Men	Marathon	2015	DNF	
Yassine Bensghir	Morocco	Men	1500 m	2015	9th (semis)	
Tosin Adeloye	Nigeria	Women	400 m 4 × 400 m relay	2015	5th (h)	Fourth-placed Nigerian relay team disqualified
Francisca Koki	Kenya	Women	400 m hurdles	2015	6th (h)	
Deborah Odeyemi	Nigeria	Women	4 × 100 m relay	2015	8th (h)	Nigerian relay team disqualified
Joy Sakari	Kenya	Women	400 m	2015	DNS (semis)	

== See also ==
- Doping at the Olympic Games
- List of doping cases in athletics
