= Netherlands at the World Athletics Championships =

- WA code: NED
- National federation: Royal Dutch Athletics Federation
- Website: www.atletiekunie.nl
- Medals: Gold 9 Silver 11 Bronze 14 Total 34

World Athletics Championships appearances (overview)
- 1976; 1980; 1983; 1987; 1991; 1993; 1995; 1997; 1999; 2001; 2003; 2005; 2007; 2009; 2011; 2013; 2015; 2017; 2019; 2022; 2023; 2025

The Netherlands has competed in all World Athletics Championships since the first edition in 1976.

Athletes representing the Netherlands have won 28 medals of which 7 gold. The individual gold medalists are Rens Blom (pole vault in 2005), Dafne Schippers (200 metres in 2015 and 2017), Sifan Hassan (1500 metres and 10,000 metres in 2019), and Femke Bol (400 metres hurdles in 2023). The Dutch women's 4 × 400 metres relay team (Eveline Saalberg, Lieke Klaver, Cathelijn Peeters, Femke Bol, Lisanne de Witte) won a gold medal in 2023.

The Netherlands was most successful at the 2023 World Championships, where the Dutch athletes won the most medals (5) and where the country had the highest medal ranking (8th).

== Medal table ==
Championships	Men			Women			Mixed			Total					
Championships	Gold	Silver	Bronze	Gold	Silver	Bronze	Gold	Silver	Bronze	Gold	Silver	Bronze	Total	Rank	Athletes
1976 Malmö	0	0	0	No female events			No mixed events			0	0	0	0	Unranked	1
1980 Sittard	No male events			0	0	0	No mixed events			0	0	0	0	-	1
1983 Helsinki	0	1	0	0	0	0	No mixed events			0	1	0	1	15	9
1987 Roma	0	0	0	0	0	0	No mixed events			0	0	0	0	-	13
1991 Tokyo	0	1	0	0	0	0	No mixed events			0	1	0	1	21	
1993 Stuttgart	0	0	1	0	0	0	No mixed events			0	0	1	1	29	
1995 Gothenburg	0	0	0	0	0	0	No mixed events			0	0	0	0	-	
1997 Athens	0	0	0	0	0	0	No mixed events			0	0	0	0	-	
1999 Seville	0	0	0	0	0	0	No mixed events			0	0	0	0	-	
2001 Edmonton	0	0	0	0	0	0	No mixed events			0	0	0	0	-	
2003 Paris	0	0	1	0	0	0	No mixed events			0	0	1	1	40	
2005 Helsinki	1	1	0	0	0	0	No mixed events			1	1	0	2	13	
2007 Osaka	0	0	2	0	0	0	No mixed events			0	0	2	2	35	
2009 Berlin	0	0	0	0	0	0	No mixed events			0	0	0	0	-	15
2011 Daegu	0	0	0	0	0	0	No mixed events			0	0	0	0	-	17
2013 Moscow	0	1	0	0	0	1	No mixed events			0	1	1	2	25	23
2015 Beijing	0	0	0	1	1	1	No mixed events			1	1	1	3	12	21
2017 London	0	0	0	1	0	3	No mixed events			1	0	3	4	15	30
2019 Doha	0	0	0	2	0	0	0	0	0	2	0	0	2	9	27
2022 Eugene	0	0	0	0	2	1	0	1	0	0	3	1	4	30	36
2023 Budapest	0	0	0	2	1	2	0	0	0	2	1	2	5	8	41
2025 Tokyo	0	0	1	2	1	1	0	1	0	2	2	2	6	4	53
2027 Beijing	To be determined														
2029 Nairobi	To be determined														
2031 Munich	To be determined														
Total	1	4	5	8	5	9	0	2	0	9	11	14	36	25	

== Multiple medalists ==
Athlete	Gold	Silver	Bronze	Total	Years
Femke Bol	3	3	1	7	2022–2025
Sifan Hassan	2	1	3	6	2015–2023
Dafne Schippers	2	1	2	5	2013–2017
Lieke Klaver	1	2	1	4	2022–2025
Eveline Saalberg	1	2	1	4	2022–2025
Rutger Smith	0	1	2	3	2005–2007
Anouk Vetter	0	1	2	3	2017–2023
