= France at the World Athletics Championships =

- WA code: FRA
- National federation: French Athletics Federation
- Website: www.athle.fr
- Medals Ranked 15th: Gold 14 Silver 19 Bronze 23 Total 56

World Athletics Championships appearances (overview)
- 1976; 1980; 1983; 1987; 1991; 1993; 1995; 1997; 1999; 2001; 2003; 2005; 2007; 2009; 2011; 2013; 2015; 2017; 2019; 2022; 2023; 2025

France is the 15th most medal-winning country in the history of the World Athletics Championships with 56 medals, including 14 gold, 19 silver and 23 bronze collected from the 1987 World Athletics Championships in Rome to the last 2022 world athletics championships in Eugene.

The best rank on the medal table was third and was achieved during the 2003 World Athletics Championships held on home soil, in Paris.

Marie-José Pérec became the first French athlete world champion in the 1991 world athletics championships on the 400 m.

Marie-José Pérec, Eunice Barber, Stéphane Diagana, Ladji Doucouré and Kevin Mayer are the only French athletes who have been two times world champion.

The French athletes with the most medals since the creation of the competition in 1983 are Eunice Barber (3 medals including a title in heptathlon, 2 in long jump including a title), Christine Arron (5 medals in sprint including a title) and Renaud Lavillenie (5 medals in pole vaulting).

== Medal table ==
Red border indicates tournament was held on home soil.

	Men			Women			Total				
Year	Gold	Silver	Bronze	Gold	Silver	Bronze	Gold	Silver	Bronze	Total	Rank
1983 Helsinki	0	0	0	0	0	0	0	0	0	0	–
1987 Rome	0	2	0	0	0	1	0	2	1	3	15
1991 Tokyo	0	1	0	1	0	0	1	1	0	2	10
1993 Stuttgart	0	0	0	0	0	0	0	0	0	0	–
1995 Gothenburg	0	0	2	1	0	0	1	0	2	3	19
1997 Athens	1	0	0	0	0	1	1	0	1	2	19
1999 Seville	0	1	0	1	1	0	1	2	0	3	14
2001 Edmonton	0	0	1	0	1	0	0	1	1	2	26
2003 Paris	1	2	0	2	1	2	3	3	2	8	3
2005 Helsinki	2	0	0	0	2	4	2	2	4	8	5
2007 Osaka	0	2	0	0	0	0	0	2	0	2	24
2009 Berlin	0	1	2	0	0	0	0	1	2	3	20
2011 Daegu	0	1	3	0	0	0	0	1	3	4	21
2013 Moscow	1	1	1	0	1	1	1	2	2	5	11
2015 Beijing	0	0	1	0	0	1	0	0	2	2	31
2017 London	3	0	1	0	0	1	3	0	2	5	4
2019 Doha	0	1	1	0	0	0	0	1	1	2	24
2022 Eugene	1	0	0	0	0	0	1	0	0	1	22
2023 Budapest	0	1	0	0	0	0	0	1	0	1	27
2025 Tokyo	1	0	1	0	0	0	0	0	0	0	17
2027 Beijing	To be determined										
2029 Nairobi	To be determined										
2031 Munich	To be determined										
Total	10	12	13	5	6	11	14	19	23	56	-

== Multiple medalists ==
Athlete	Gold	Silver	Bronze	Total	Years
Eunice Barber	2	3	0	5	1999-2005
Stéphane Diagana	2	1	1	4	1995-2003
Marie-José Pérec	2	0	0	2	1991-1997
Ladji Doucouré	2	0	0	2	2005
Kevin Mayer	2	0	0	2	2017-2022
Muriel Hurtis	1	2	1	4	1997-2003
Christine Arron	1	1	3	5	1997-2005
Patricia Girard	1	1	1	3	1997-2003
Sylvianne Félix	1	1	1	3	1997-2003
Marc Raquil	1	1	0	2	2003
Yohann Diniz	1	1	0	2	2007-2017
Romain Mesnil	0	2	0	2	2007-2009
Renaud Lavillenie	0	1	4	5	2009-2017
Christophe Lemaitre	0	1	1	2	2011
Mélina Robert-Michon	0	1	1	2	2013-2017
Manuela Montebrun	0	0	2	2	2003-2005
Mahiedine Mekhissi-Benabbad	0	0	2	2	2011-2013
