= United States national Olympic track and field team =

United States national athletics team

USA Track & Field
- Sport: Track & Field; Long-Distance Running; Race Walking
- Jurisdiction: National
- Abbreviation: USATF
- Founded: 1979 as The Athletics Congress/USA
- Headquarters: Indianapolis, IN, United States
- CEO: Max Siegel
- Sponsor: Nike, Inc., The Hershey Company, BMW, Visa Inc., Chobani, Garden of Life, Rosetta Stone, University of Phoenix
- Replaced: Amateur Athletic Union
- (founded): 1878

Official website
- www.usatf.org
- (United States)

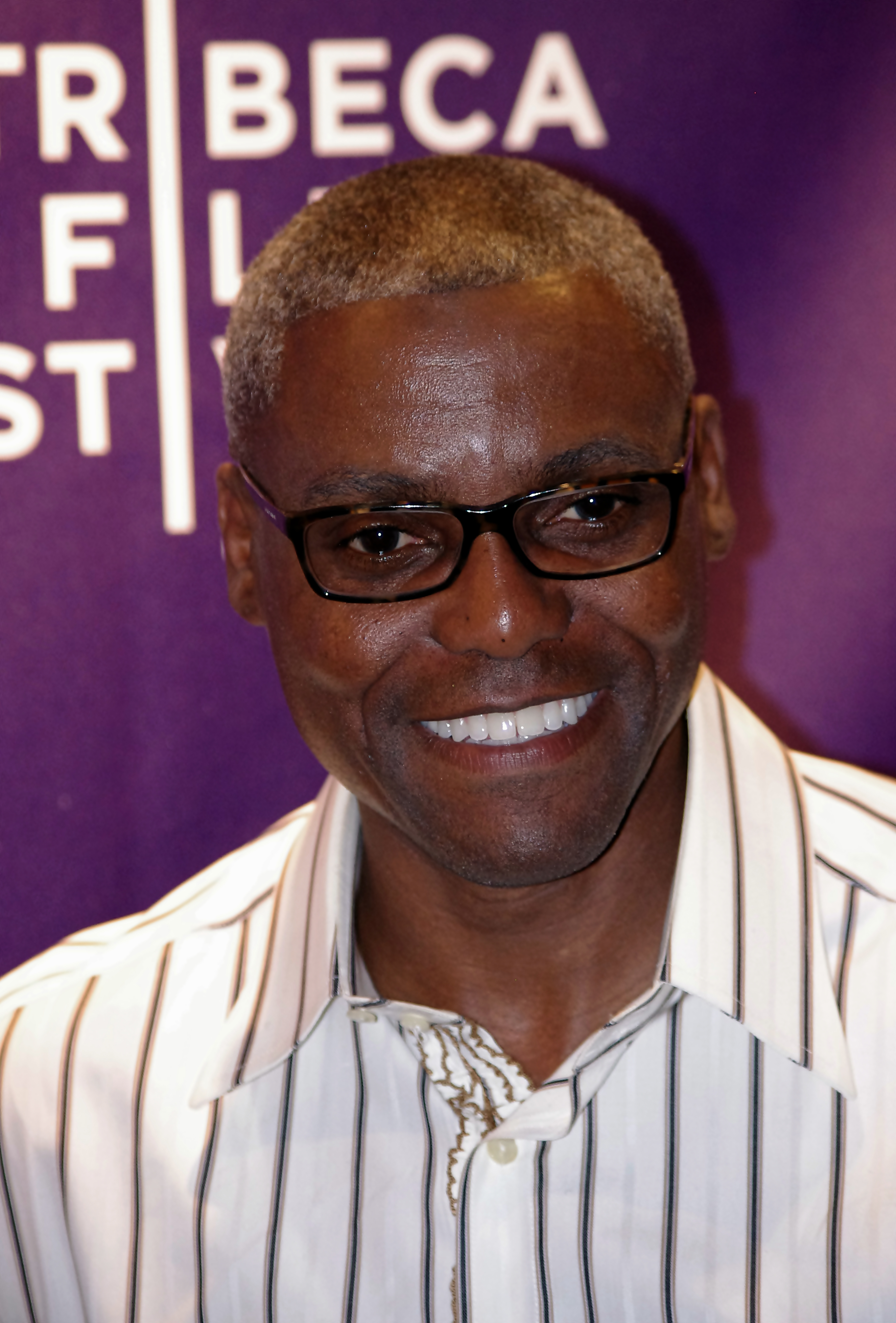
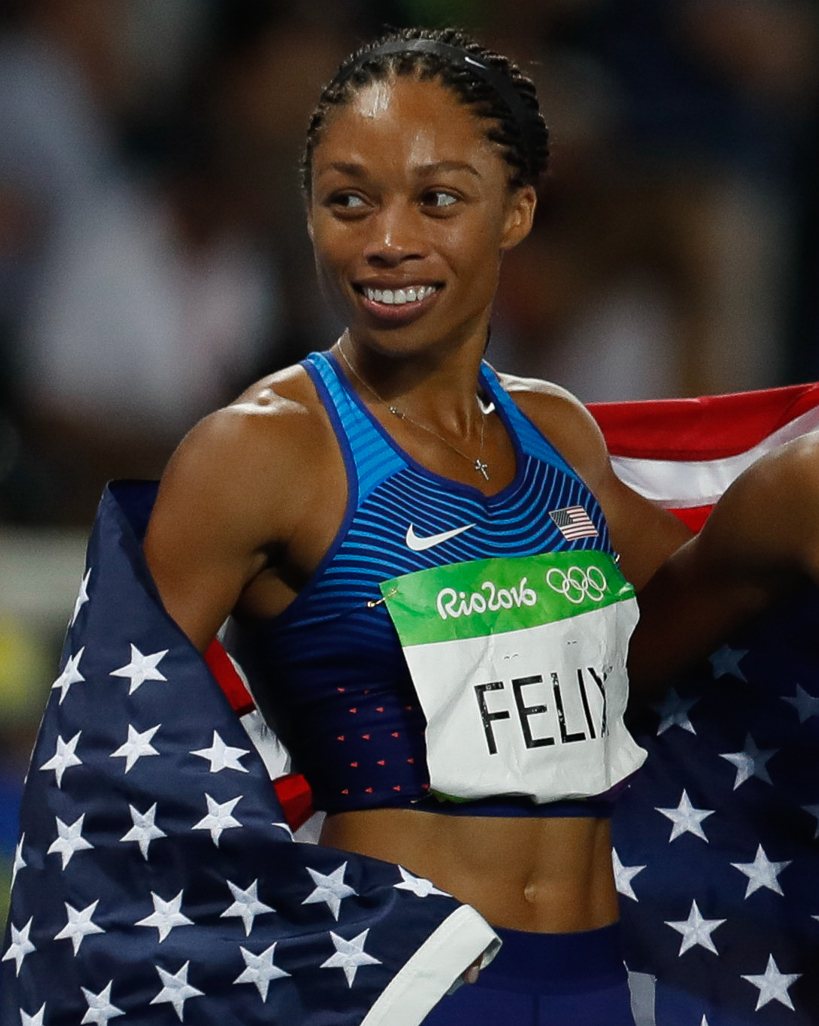
Carl Lewis and Allyson Felix, are the US athletes with most medals at the Olympics, respectively in the men's and women's.

The United States national Olympic track and field team represents the United States in international athletics competitions such as the Olympic Games or the World Athletics Championships. The governing body of the team is USA Track & Field (USATF).

== Medal tables ==
The United States have 29 participations in the Olympic Games of 30 editions held (the only exception is due to the boycott of Moscow 1980)

Event	Medals			
Event	Gold medal	Silver medal	Bronze medal	
Olympic Games	353	282	220	855
World Athletics Championships	See United States at the World Athletics Championships			

Allyson Felix has won the most Olympic medals of any United States track and field athlete, with 11 total medals including one individual gold. Carl Lewis has ten Olympic medals including seven individual gold.

Allyson Felix has 20 World Athletics Championships medals, more than any other athlete in the world. In the United States, LaShawn Meritt is second to Felix with 11 World Athletics Championships medal.

== Olympic Games ==
The United States is the nation that has won the most medals in athletics at the Olympic Games, around 855, of which 353 are gold. The United States men's and women's teams have participated in all editions of the games except for the Moscow 1980 games due to boycott.

Editions	Men				Women				Mixed				Total			
Editions	Gold medal	Silver medal	Bronze medal		Gold medal	Silver medal	Bronze medal		Gold medal	Silver medal	Bronze medal		Gold medal	Silver medal	Bronze medal	
(Greece) Athens 1896	9	6	1	16	-	-	-	-	N/A				9	6	1	16
(France) Paris 1900	16	13	10	39	-	-	-	-	N/A				16	13	10	39
(United States) St. Louis 1904	22	22	19	63	-	-	-	-	N/A				22	22	19	63
(United Kingdom) London 1908	16	9	10	35	-	-	-	-	N/A				16	9	10	35
(Sweden) Stockholm 1912	14	14	11	39	-	-	-	-	N/A				14	14	11	39
(Belgium) Antwerp 1920	9	12	8	29	-	-	-	-	N/A				9	12	8	29
(France) Paris 1924	12	10	10	32	-	-	-	-	N/A				12	10	10	32
(Netherlands) Amsterdam 1928	8	6	7	21	1	2	1	4	N/A				9	8	8	25
(United States) Los Angeles 1932	11	10	5	26	5	3	1	9	N/A				16	13	6	35
(Nazi Germany) Berlin 1936	12	7	4	23	2	0	0	2	N/A				14	7	4	25
(United Kingdom) London 1948	11	5	9	25	1	0	1	2	N/A				12	5	10	27
(Finland) Helsinki 1952	14	10	6	30	1	0	0	1	N/A				15	10	6	31
(Australia) Melbourne 1956	15	9	4	28	1	1	1	3	N/A				16	10	5	31
(Italy) Rome 1960	9	8	5	22	3	0	1	4	N/A				12	8	6	26
(Japan) Tokyo 1964	12	5	3	20	2	2	0	4	N/A				14	7	3	24
Mexico City 1968	12	5	7	24	3	1	0	4	N/A				15	6	7	28
(West Germany) Munich 1972	6	7	6	19	0	1	2	3	N/A				6	8	8	22
(Canada) Montreal 1976	6	6	7	19	0	2	1	3	N/A				6	8	8	22
(Soviet Union) Moscow 1980	boycotted edition															
(United States) Los Angeles 1984	9	8	7	24	7	7	2	16	N/A				16	15	9	40
(South Korea) Seoul 1988	7	5	5	17	6	2	1	9	N/A				13	7	6	26
(Spain) Barcelona 1992	8	5	7	20	4	3	3	10	N/A				12	8	10	30
(United States) Atlanta 1996	10	4	2	16	3	1	3	7	N/A				13	5	5	23
(Australia) Sydney 2000	5	4	3	12	2	0	2	4	N/A				7	4	5	16
(Greece) Athens 2004	7	10	3	20	2	2	2	6	N/A				9	12	5	26
(China) Beijing 2008	4	5	6	15	3	5	2	10	N/A				7	10	8	25
(United Kingdom) London 2012	3	8	3	14	6	4	4	14	N/A				9	12	7	28
(Brazil) Rio de Janeiro 2016	7	5	4	16	6	5	5	16	N/A				13	10	9	32
(Japan) Tokyo 2020	2	6	2	10	5	6	4	15	0	0	1	1	7	12	6	25
(France) Paris 2024	7	6	5	18	7	4	4	15	0	1	0	1	14	11	9	34
Total	283	230	179	692	70	51	40	161	0	1	1	2	353	282	220	855

== See also ==
- Summer Olympics medal table
- World Athletics Championships medal table
- USA Track & Field
