= Turkey at the World Athletics Championships =

- WA code: TUR
- National federation: Turkish Athletic Federation
- Website: www.taf.org.tr
- Medals Ranked 55th: Gold 1 Silver 3 Bronze 0 Total 4

World Athletics Championships appearances (overview)
- 1983; 1987; 1991; 1993; 1995; 1997; 1999; 2001; 2003; 2005; 2007; 2009; 2011; 2013; 2015; 2017; 2019; 2022; 2023; 2025

Turkey has competed in every World Athletics Championships since the event's first edition in 1983.

== Medalists ==
Medal	Name	Year	Event
Silver	Süreyya Ayhan	2003 Saint-Denis	Women's 1500 metres
Silver	Karin Melis Mey	2009 Berlin	Women's long jump
Gold	Ramil Guliyev	2017 London	Men's 200 metres
Silver	Yasmani Copello	2017 London	Men's 400 metres hurdles

== Summary ==
Championships	Athletes	Gold	Silver	Bronze	Total	Rank
1983 Helsinki		0	0	0	0	–
1987 Rome		0	0	0	0	–
1991 Tokyo		0	0	0	0	–
1993 Stuttgart		0	0	0	0	–
1995 Gothenburg		0	0	0	0	–
1997 Athens		0	0	0	0	–
1999 Seville		0	0	0	0	–
2001 Edmonton		0	0	0	0	–
2003 Paris		0	1	0	1	31
2005 Helsinki		0	0	0	0	–
2007 Osaka		0	0	0	0	–
2009 Berlin	12	0	1	0	1	25
2011 Daegu	20	0	0	0	0	–
2013 Moscow	10	0	0	0	0	–
2015 Beijing	12	0	0	0	0	–
2017 London	12	1	1	0	2	11
2019 Doha	18	0	0	0	0	–
2022 Eugene	7	0	0	0	0	–
2023 Budapest	17	0	0	0	0	–
2025 Tokyo	20	0	0	0	0	–
2027 Beijing	To be determined					
2029 Nairobi	To be determined					
2031 Munich	To be determined					
Total		1	3	0	4	55

== Doping disqualifications ==
Athlete	Sex	Event	Year(s)	Result	Notes
Elvan Abeylegesse	Women	5000 m 10,000 m	2007 2009	5th (5000 m, 2007) (silver) (10,000 m, 2007) DQ (10,000 m, 2009)	Disqualified at two editions
Alemitu Bekele Degfa	Women	1500 m 5000 m	2009 2011	11th (1500 m heats, 2009) 13th (5000 m, 2009) 9th (5000 m heats, 2011)	Disqualified at two editions
Aslı Çakır Alptekin	Women	1500 m	2011	10th (semis)	
Bahar Doğan	Women	Marathon	2011	36th	
Semiha Mutlu	Women	20 kilometres walk	2011	DNF	
Pınar Saka	Women	400 m 4 × 400 m relay	2011	6th (h)	Turkish relay team disqualified
Binnaz Uslu	Women	3000 m steeplechase	2011	7th	
Ümmü Kiraz	Women	Marathon	2013	DNF	

== See also ==
- Turkey at the European Athletics Championships
