= United States at the World Athletics Championships =

- WA code: USA
- National federation: USA Track & Field
- Website: www.usatf.org/Home.aspx
- Medals Ranked 1st: Gold 211 Silver 139 Bronze 119 Total 469

World Athletics Championships appearances (overview)
- 1976; 1980; 1983; 1987; 1991; 1993; 1995; 1997; 1999; 2001; 2003; 2005; 2007; 2009; 2011; 2013; 2015; 2017; 2019; 2022; 2023; 2025

The United States has competed at every edition of the World Athletics Championships since its inception in 1983. It has been the most successful nation at the global competition for track and field. By the end of the 2025 World Championships, its athletes had won a total of 469 medals, 211 of them gold – more than double that of the next most successful nation Kenya, as well as more than the combined total of the Soviet Union and post-Soviet states. It has been the top nation in the championships medal table at every edition bar 1983 and 1987 (East Germany), 2001 (Russia) and 2015 (Kenya). It also ranks number one on points in the national placing tables. As one of the foremost nations in the sport internationally, its delegations for the championships are among the largest. It also won the first title of "World Team Champions" inaugurated for the Oregon 2022.

The most decorated athlete of the competition's history is American: Allyson Felix has won 20 World Championships medals, eleven of them gold, competing across the individual and relay sprint events. Among men, the United States has three of the four most decorated men (after Usain Bolt), all of them sprinters; LaShawn Merritt has eleven medals, Carl Lewis won ten and Michael Johnson won eight. All three won eight gold medals. Johnson is the nation's most successful athlete individually (and the third most successful overall), having won six gold medals in the 200-meter dash and 400-meter dash. American Gail Devers is the second most successful woman individually, with four golds and two silver medals from the 100-meter dash and 100-meter hurdles. Felix and Amy Acuff have made the most appearances for the United States, each having represented their country at eight separate editions.

The United States team was affected by doping during the period from 1997 to 2003, principally in sprinting events. The loss of several gold medals in 2001 resulted in the United States dropping to second in the medal rankings for the first time since 1987.

== Medal table ==
Championships	Men			Women			Mixed			Total					
Championships	Gold	Silver	Bronze	Gold	Silver	Bronze	Gold	Silver	Bronze	Gold	Silver	Bronze	Total	Rank	Athletes
1976 Malmö	0	0	0	No female events			No mixed events			0	0	0	0	Unranked	3
1980 Sittard	No male events			0	0	0	No mixed events			0	0	0	0	Unranked	6
1983 Helsinki	6	8	4	2	1	3	No mixed events			8	9	7	24	2	101
1987 Roma	7	3	4	3	1	2	No mixed events			10	4	6	20	2	
1991 Tokyo	9	4	7	1	4	1	No mixed events			10	8	8	26	1	
1993 Stuttgart	8	3	3	5	4	2	No mixed events			13	7	5	25	1	
1995 Gothenburg	7	1	4	5	1	1	No mixed events			12	2	5	19	1	
1997 Athens	4	1	6	2	2	2	No mixed events			6	3	8	17	1	
1999 Seville	6	0	3	4	3	1	No mixed events			10	3	4	17	1	
2001 Edmonton	3	3	2	2	2	1	No mixed events			5	5	3	13	2	
2003 Paris	6	4	0	2	3	1	No mixed events			8	7	1	16	1	
2005 Helsinki	9	4	2	5	4	1	No mixed events			14	8	3	25	1	
2007 Osaka	10	3	6	4	2	1	No mixed events			14	5	7	26	1	
2009 Berlin	6	4	4	4	2	2	No mixed events			10	6	6	22	1	160
2011 Daegu	6	5	3	6	4	4	No mixed events			12	9	7	28	1	127
2013 Moscow	4	8	2	4	5	3	No mixed events			8	13	5	26	1	137
2015 Beijing	4	3	2	2	3	4	No mixed events			6	6	6	18	3	130
2017 London	3	6	4	7	5	5	No mixed events			10	11	9	30	1	167
2019 Doha	9	5	1	4	6	3	1	0	0	14	11	4	29	1	144
2022 Eugene	6	7	5	7	2	5	0	0	1	13	9	11	33	1	151
2023 Budapest	6	2	5	5	6	4	1	0	0	12	8	9	29	1	138
2025 Tokyo	6	2	3	9	3	2	1	0	0	16	5	5	26	1	141
2027 Beijing	To be determined														
2029 Nairobi	To be determined														
2032 Munich	To be determined														
Total	125	76	70	83	63	48	3	0	1	211	139	119	469	1	

== Multiple medalists ==
Athlete	Gold	Silver	Bronze	Total	Years
Allyson Felix	14	3	3	20	2005–2022
LaShawn Merritt	8	3	0	11	2005–2015
Carl Lewis	8	1	1	10	1983–1993
Michael Johnson	8	0	0	8	1991–1999
Noah Lyles	6	1	0	7	2019–2023
Gail Devers	5	3	0	8	1991–2001
Sanya Richards-Ross	5	2	0	7	2003–2015
Jeremy Wariner	5	1	0	6	2005–2009
Natasha Hastings	5	1	0	6	2007–2017
Jessica Beard	5	1	0	6	2009–2019
Maurice Greene	5	0	0	5	1997–2001
Justin Gatlin	4	6	0	10	2005–2019
Jearl Miles Clark	4	3	2	9	1991–2003
Allen Johnson	4	0	1	5	1995–2005
Dwight Phillips	4	0	1	5	2003–2011
Kerron Clement	4	0	1	5	2007–2017
Vernon Norwood	4	0	1	5	2015–2023
Jackie Joyner-Kersee	4	0	0	4	1987–1993
Brittney Reese	4	0	0	4	2009–2017
Christian Taylor	4	0	0	4	2011–2019
Gwen Torrence	3	4	1	8	1991–1995
Christian Coleman	3	3	0	6	2017–2023
Butch Reynolds	3	2	1	6	1987–1995
Carmelita Jeter	3	1	3	7	2007–2013
Fred Kerley	3	1	1	5	2017–2023
Calvin Smith	3	1	0	4	1983–1987
Lauryn Williams	3	1	0	4	2005–2007
Tyson Gay	3	1	0	4	2007–2009
Sydney McLaughlin-Levrone	3	1	0	4	2019–2022
Marion Jones	3	0	1	4	1997–1999
Bershawn Jackson	3	0	1	4	2005–2011
Angelo Taylor	3	0	1	4	2007–2011
Greg Foster	3	0	0	3	1983–1991
Dan O'Brien	3	0	0	3	1991–1995
John Godina	3	0	0	3	1995–2001
Grant Holloway	3	0	0	3	2019–2023

== Best placings ==
Of the 50 events that have been held over the history of the championships, 30 have been won by American athletes (17 men's events and 13 women's events). A further 4 men's and 5 women's events have featured an American medallist at some point. Americans have topped the podium in all sprint and hurdles events, as well as all the men's jumps. By far the weakest events of the United States are men's and women's racewalking and women's throws – only four bronze medals have been won by American athletes in these disciplines, among a total of over 350 medals across events. Americans have featured in the final at some point of every discipline contested at the championships.

This table shows the best place finish by an American athlete by event. Where the best position has been achieved multiple times, the first instance is shown.

Event	Men's placing	Male athlete	Women's placing	Female athlete
100 m	1st place, gold medalist(s)	Carl Lewis (1983)	1st place, gold medalist(s)	Gail Devers (1993)
200 m	1st place, gold medalist(s)	Calvin Smith (1983)	1st place, gold medalist(s)	Inger Miller (1999)
400 m	1st place, gold medalist(s)	Antonio Pettigrew (1991)	1st place, gold medalist(s)	Jearl Miles (1993)
800 m	1st place, gold medalist(s)	Donavan Brazier (2019)	1st place, gold medalist(s)	Athing Mu (2022)
1500 m	1st place, gold medalist(s)	Bernard Lagat (2007)	1st place, gold medalist(s)	Mary Decker (1983)
3000 m	Not contested		1st place, gold medalist(s)	Mary Decker (1983)
5000 m	1st place, gold medalist(s)	Bernard Lagat (2007)	6th	Molly Huddle (2013)
10,000 m	4th	Galen Rupp (2013)	2nd place, silver medalist(s)	Kara Goucher (2007)
Marathon	1st place, gold medalist(s)	Mark Plaatjes (1993)	2nd place, silver medalist(s)	Marianne Dickerson (1983)
110/100 m hurdles	1st place, gold medalist(s)	Greg Foster (1983)	1st place, gold medalist(s)	Gail Devers (1993)
400 m hurdles	1st place, gold medalist(s)	Edwin Moses (1983)	1st place, gold medalist(s)	Kim Batten (1995)
3000 m s'chase	3rd place, bronze medalist(s)	Evan Jager (2017)	1st place, gold medalist(s)	Emma Coburn (2017)
10 km walk	Not contested		15th	Lynn Weik (1987)
20 km walk	18th	Allen James (1993)	19th	Debbi Lawrence (2001)
50 km walk	3rd place, bronze medalist(s)	Curt Clausen (1999)	4th	Kathleen Burnett (2017)
4 × 100 m relay	1st place, gold medalist(s)	United States (1987)	1st place, gold medalist(s)	United States (1987)
4 × 400 m relay	1st place, gold medalist(s)	United States (1983)	1st place, gold medalist(s)	United States (1993)
High jump	1st place, gold medalist(s)	Charles Austin (1991)	1st place, gold medalist(s)	Brigetta Barrett (2013)
Pole vault	1st place, gold medalist(s)	Brad Walker (2007)	1st place, gold medalist(s)	Stacy Dragila (1999)
Long jump	1st place, gold medalist(s)	Carl Lewis (1983)	1st place, gold medalist(s)	Jackie Joyner-Kersee (1987)
Triple jump	1st place, gold medalist(s)	Kenny Harrison (1991)	3rd place, bronze medalist(s)	Tori Franklin (2022)
Shot put	1st place, gold medalist(s)	John Godina (1995)	1st place, gold medalist(s)	Chase Ealey (2022)
Discus throw	1st place, gold medalist(s)	Anthony Washington (1999)	1st place, gold medalist(s)	Laulauga Tausaga (2023)
Javelin throw	2nd place, silver medalist(s)	Tom Petranoff (1983)	2nd place, silver medalist(s)	Kara Winger (2022)
Hammer throw	5th	Lance Deal (1995)	1st place, gold medalist(s)	DeAnna Price (2019)
Decathlon/heptathlon	1st place, gold medalist(s)	Dan O'Brien (1991)	1st place, gold medalist(s)	Jackie Joyner-Kersee (1987)

== Doping ==
Year	Athlete	Event	Notes
1991	Delisa Floyd	Women's 800 m	Semi-finalist
1993	Mike Stulce	Men's shot put	Stripped of bronze medal
1997	Antonio Pettigrew	Men's 400 m	7th individually, stripped of relay gold medal
1999	Antonio Pettigrew	Men's 400 m	5th individually, stripped of relay gold medal
1999	Jerome Young	Men's 400 m	4th individually, stripped of relay gold medal
2001	Ramon Clay	Men's 200 m	Quarter-finalist
2001	Tim Montgomery	Men's 100 m	Stripped of individual silver and relay gold medals
2001	Antonio Pettigrew	Men's 400 m	4th individually, stripped of relay gold medal
2001	Jerome Young	Men's 400 m	Semi-finalist, stripped of relay gold medal
2001	Marion Jones	Women's 100 m, 200 m	Stripped of 100 m silver, 200 m gold and relay gold medals
2001	Kelli White	Women's 100 m, 200 m	7th in 100 m, stripped of 200 m bronze and relay gold medals
2003	Calvin Harrison	Men's 400 m	6th individually, stripped of relay gold
2003	Tim Montgomery	Men's 100 m	5th in final
2003	Chris Phillips	Men's 110 m hurdles	5th in final
2003	Kevin Toth	Men's shot put	4th in final
2003	Jerome Young	Men's 400 m	stripped of individual and relay gold medals
2003	Regina Jacobs	Women's 1500 m	Semi-finalist
2003	Melissa Price	Women's hammer throw	12th in final
2003	Kelli White	Women's 100 m, 200 m	stripped of 100 m and 200 m gold medals
