= North Korea at the World Athletics Championships =

- Flag of North Korea
- WA code: PRK
- Medals: Gold 1 Silver 0 Bronze 0 Total 1

World Athletics Championships appearances (overview)
- 1983; 1987–1997; 1999; 2001; 2003; 2005; 2007; 2009; 2011; 2013; 2015; 2017; 2019; 2022–2025

North Korea has taken part regularly in the World Athletics Championships. Their sole medal was won by Jong Song-ok in the women's marathon at the 1999 edition. Besides that, they have only had 3 other top-8 finishes.

== Medalists ==
Medal	Name	Year	Event
Gold	Jong Song-ok	1999 Seville	Women's marathon

=== By event ===
Event	Gold	Silver	Bronze	Total
Marathon	1	0	0	1
Totals (1 entries)	1	0	0	1

=== By gender ===
Gender	Gold	Silver	Bronze	Total
Women	1	0	0	1
Men	0	0	0	0

== See also ==
- North Korea at the Olympics
- North Korea at the Paralympics
