= Russia at the World Athletics Championships =

- WA code: RUS
- National federation: All-Russia Athletic Federation
- Website: eng.rusathletics.com
- Medals Ranked 3rd: Gold 47 Silver 54 Bronze 52 Total 153

World Athletics Championships appearances (overview)
- 1993; 1995; 1997; 1999; 2001; 2003; 2005; 2007; 2009; 2011; 2013; 2015; 2017–2025

Other related appearances
- Authorised Neutral Athletes (2017–pres.)

Russia competed at every edition of the World Athletics Championships 1993 to the 2017 World Championships, from which its athletes have been banned from competing as Russian. In order for Russian nationals to compete at the World Athletics Championship (from 2017 on), they must be approved as authorised neutral athletes by the IAAF. Prior to 1993, Russian athletes competed for the Soviet Union. Russia has the second-highest medal total among nations at the competition (153), after the United States. At 47 gold medals, it holds the third-highest total after the United States and Kenya. It has had the most success in women's events and in field events. As a major nation in the sport of athletics, it typically sent a delegation numbering over 100 athletes.

It topped the medal table at the 2001 tournament, overtaking the United States following the redistribution of medals due to doping cases. Russia also initially finished top of the medal table at the 2013 Moscow Championships, but lost this position due to doping disqualifications of its athletes. Russia's performance at the competition has been strongly affected by doping. Furthermore, the country's doping problems are distinct because in Russia doping is supplied to the athletes by the government. The country was banned from competing in 2017 due to the state-sponsored doping and Russians had to gain special dispensation to compete as Authorised Neutral Athletes. Various members of the Russian delegation have been banned for doping at every edition of the competition it has competed at, with the exceptions of 2003 and 2015 (though Russian medalists in both those years were subsequently banned).

Russia's most successful athlete at the competition is horizontal jumps specialist Tatyana Lebedeva, who between 2001 and 2009 won two triple jump gold medals, a long jump title, and two further silver medals. Women's pole vaulter Yelena Isinbayeva has also won three gold medals, in addition to a bronze. Yuliya Pechonkina, a 400 metres hurdles and relay athlete, has won the most medals for Russia, with her total of seven. The most successful Russian man at the World Championships is high jumper Yaroslav Rybakov, who won three high jump silvers before becoming champion in 2009.

== Medal table ==
Championships	Men			Women			Total					
Championships	Gold	Silver	Bronze	Gold	Silver	Bronze	Gold	Silver	Bronze	Total	Rank	Athletes
1993 Stuttgart	0	3	3	3	5	2	3	8	5	16	3	
1995 Göteborg	0	1	0	1	3	7	1	4	7	12	11	
1997 Athens	0	2	2	1	2	1	1	4	3	8	9	
1999 Seville	3	1	0	2	3	3	5	4	3	12	2	
2001 Edmonton	1	3	3	4	4	3	5	7	6	18	1	
2003 Paris	1	2	1	6	5	4	7	7	5	19	2	
2005 Helsinki	1	3	2	6	4	2	7	7	4	18	2	
2007 Osaka	0	1	1	4	6	2	4	7	3	14	3	
2009 Berlin	1	0	1	1	0	4	2	0	5	7	10	106
2011 Daegu	1	1	1	2	0	2	3	1	3	7	6	76
2013 Moscow	1	0	2	2	2	1	3	2	3	8	6	119
2015 Beijing	1	1	0	1	0	1	2	1	1	4	9	62
Total	10	18	16	33	34	32	43	52	48	143	3	—

== Medalists ==
Athlete	Gold	Silver	Bronze	Total	Years
Tatyana Lebedeva	3	2	0	5	2001–2009
Yelena Isinbayeva	3	0	1	4	2003–2013
Yuliya Pechonkina	2	3	2	7	2001–2007
Tatyana Lysenko	2	1	0	3	2005–2013
Olimpiada Ivanova	2	0	0	2	2001–2005
Tatyana Tomashova	2	0	0	2	2003–2005
Yaroslav Rybakov	1	3	0	4	2001–2009
Irina Privalova *	1	2	2	5	1993–1995
Anna Chicherova	1	2	2	5	2007–2015
Maksim Tarasov *	1	2	1	4	1993–1999
* Includes medals won competing for the Soviet Union

== Doping ==
Athlete	Sex	Event	Year(s)	Result	Notes
Liliya Nurutdinova	Women	800 m	1993	7th	
Olimpiada Ivanova	Women	10,000 m walk	1997	2nd place, silver medalist(s)	
Lyubov Tsyoma	Women	800 m	1997	DNF (semis)	
German Skurygin	Men	50 kilometres walk	1999	1st place, gold medalist(s)	
Svetlana Laukhova	Women	100 m hurdles	2001	5th (heats)	
Yekaterina Leshchova	Women	200 m	2001	6th (heats)	
Natalya Sadova	Women	Discus throw	2001	1st place, gold medalist(s)	
Svetlana Krivelyova	Women	Shot put	2005	4th	
Tatyana Kotova	Women	Long jump	2005	2nd place, silver medalist(s)	
Olga Kuzenkova	Women	Hammer throw	2005	1st place, gold medalist(s)	
Svetlana Cherkasova	Women	800 m	2007	6th (h)	
Yuliya Fomenko	Women	1500 m	2007	7th	
Gulfiya Khanafeyeva	Women	Hammer throw	2007	10th	
Darya Pishchalnikova	Women	Discus throw	2007	2nd place, silver medalist(s)	
Yelena Soboleva	Women	1500 m	2007	2nd place, silver medalist(s)	
Valeriy Borchin	Men	20 kilometres walk	2009 2011	(gold) (2009) (gold) (2011)	Disqualified at two editions
Sergey Kirdyapkin	Men	50 kilometres walk	2009 2011	(gold) (2009) DNF (2011)	Disqualified at two editions
Mikhail Lemayev	Men	Marathon	2009	45th	
Ildar Minshin	Men	3000 m steeplechase	2009	7th	
Anna Alminova	Women	1500 m	2009	10th (semis)	
Yuliya Chermoshanskaya	Women	4 × 100 m relay	2009	4th	Russian relay team disqualified
Yelizaveta Grechishnikova	Women	5000 m	2009 2011	10th (h) 14th	
Olga Kaniskina	Women	20 kilometres walk	2009 2011	(gold) (2009) (gold) (2011)	Disqualified at two editions
Anastasiya Kapachinskaya	Women	400 m 4 × 400 m relay	2009 2011	7th (2009) (bronze) (2011)	2009 and 2011 bronze medal-winning Russian relay teams annulled. Disqualified at two editions
Svetlana Klyuka	Women	800 m	2009	5th (semis)	
Mariya Konovalova	Women	10,000 m	2009	11th	
Tatyana Petlyuk	Women	800 m 4 × 400 m relay	2009 2011	6th (semis) DNF (h)	2009 Russian relay team disqualified
Nailya Yulamanova	Women	Marathon	2009	8th	Bronze medal-winning Russian team for the 2009 World Marathon Cup annulled
Denis Alekseyev	Men	4 × 400 m relay	2011	4th	Russian relay team disqualified
Sergey Bakulin	Men	50 kilometres walk	2011	1st place, gold medalist(s)	
Vladimir Kanaykin	Men	20 kilometres walk	2011	2nd place, silver medalist(s)	
Sergey Morozov	Men	20 kilometres walk	2011	12th	
Stanislav Yemelyanov	Men	20 kilometres walk	2011	5th	
Igor Yerokhin	Men	50 kilometres walk	2011		
Yekaterina Kostetskaya	Women	800 m	2011	5th	
Olga Kucherenko	Women	Long jump	2011 2013	(silver) 5th	Disqualified at two editions
Yekaterina Sharmina	Women	1500 m	2011 2013	9th (semis) 6th	Disqualified at two editions
Tatyana Mineyeva	Women	20 kilometres walk	2011	17th	
Anna Omorova	Women	Shot put	2011	10th	
Yuliya Stepanova	Women	800 m	2011	8th	
Mariya Savinova	Women	800 m	2011 2013	1st place, gold medalist(s) 2nd place, silver medalist(s)	Disqualified at two editions
Olesya Syreva	Women	1500 m	2011	9th (semis)	
Yuliya Zaripova	Women	3000 m steeplechase	2011	1st place, gold medalist(s)	
Soslan Tsirikhov	Men	Shot put	2013	13th (q)	
Anna Bulgakova	Women	Hammer throw	2013	5th	
Vera Ganeyeva	Women	Discus throw	2013	7th (q)	
Yevgeniya Kolodko	Women	Shot put	2013	5th	
Antonina Krivoshapka	Women	400 m 4 × 400 m relay	2013	1st place, gold medalist(s)	Gold medal-winning Russian relay team disqualified
