= Portugal at the 2022 World Athletics Championships =

- Flag of Portugal
- WA code: POR

in Eugene, United States 15 July 2022 – 24 July 2022
- Competitors: 23 (7 men and 16 women)
- Medals Ranked 22nd: Gold 1 Silver 0 Bronze 0 Total 1

World Athletics Championships appearances (overview)
- 1980; 1983; 1987; 1991; 1993; 1995; 1997; 1999; 2001; 2003; 2005; 2007; 2009; 2011; 2013; 2015; 2017; 2019; 2022; 2023; 2025

Portugal competed at the 2022 World Athletics Championships in Eugene, United States, from 15 to 24 July 2022.

== Medallists ==
Medal	Name	Event	Date
Gold	Pedro Pichardo	Men's triple jump	23 July

== Results ==
Portugal entered 23 athletes.

Key

- Q = Qualified for the next round
- q = Qualified for the next round as a fastest loser or, in field events, by position without achieving the qualifying target
- NR = National record
- PB = Personal best
- SB = Season best
- N/A = Round not applicable for the event

=== Men ===
Track and road events

Athlete	Event	Heat		Semi-final		Final	
Athlete	Event	Result	Rank	Result	Rank	Result	Rank
Isaac Nader	1500 m	3:42.81	13	Did not advance			
Rui Coelho	35 km walk	—N/a				2:44:55 SB	39
João Vieira	35 km walk	—N/a				DNF	–

Field events

Athlete	Event	Qualification		Final	
Athlete	Event	Distance	Position	Distance	Position
Tiago Pereira	Triple jump	16.69	11 q	16.69	10
Pedro Pichardo	Triple jump	17.16	1 Q	17.95 WL	1st place, gold medalist(s)
Tsanko Arnaudov	Shot put	19.93	17	Did not advance	
Leandro Ramos	Javelin throw	77.34	22	Did not advance	

=== Women ===
Track and road events

Athlete	Event	Heat		Semi-final		Final	
Athlete	Event	Result	Rank	Result	Rank	Result	Rank
Lorène Bazolo	100 m	11.44	6	Did not advance			
Lorène Bazolo	200 m	23.41	6	Did not advance			
Cátia Azevedo	400 m	51.55	5 q	51.79	7	Did not advance	
Marta Pen	1500 m	4:08.58	7	Did not advance			
Mariana Machado	5000 m	15:18.09 PB	12	—N/a		Did not advance	
Vera Barbosa	400 m hurdles	56.79	7	Did not advance			
Ana Cabecinha	20 km walk	—N/a				1:30:29 SB	9
Carolina Costa	20 km walk	—N/a				1:36:31	25
Inês Henriques	20 km walk	—N/a				1:38:32	32
Inês Henriques	35 km walk	—N/a				2:51:12 SB	13
Vitória Oliveira	35 km walk	—N/a				2:57:37	19
Sandra Silva	35 km walk	—N/a				3:17:23 PB	35

Field events

Athlete	Event	Qualification		Final	
Athlete	Event	Distance	Position	Distance	Position
Evelise Veiga	Long jump	6.54	15	Did not advance	
Patrícia Mamona	Triple jump	14.32	10 q	14.29	8
Auriol Dongmo	Shot put	19.38	3 Q	19.62	5
Jessica Inchude	Shot put	18.01	17	Did not advance	
Liliana Cá	Discus throw	61.41	11 q	63.99 SB	6
Irina Rodrigues	Discus throw	57.69	23	Did not advance	
