= Kenya at the World Athletics Championships =

- WA code: KEN
- National federation: Athletics Kenya
- Website: www.athleticskenya.or.ke
- Medals Ranked 2nd: Gold 72 Silver 60 Bronze 50 Total 182

World Athletics Championships appearances (overview)
- 1983; 1987; 1991; 1993; 1995; 1997; 1999; 2001; 2003; 2005; 2007; 2009; 2011; 2013; 2015; 2017; 2019; 2022; 2023; 2025

Kenya has competed at every edition of the World Athletics Championships since its inception in 1983. It has won the second highest number of gold medals at the championships (after the United States) and also has the second highest medals total (after the U.S.).

The vast majority of its medals have come in middle- and long-distance running events, mostly on the men's side. It ranks fourth on all-time placing tables at the competition, reflecting its narrow event focus. The nation typically sends medium-sized delegations of 40–50 athletes. Kenya ranked number one on gold medals at the 2015 World Championships in Athletics and has finished in the top five nations on the medal table at all but five editions.

The country's most successful athlete at the competition is Faith Kipyegon, who has won five gold medals and three silver medals in the women's 1500 metres and 5000 metres. Kenya's most successful man, Ezekiel Kemboi has won four gold medals and three silver medals in the 3000 metres steeplechase. Vivian Cheruiyot, has also won four gold medals and also a silver in the 5000 metres and 10,000 metres events. Men's steeplechaser Moses Kiptanui won three straight titles from 1991 to 1995 and Asbel Kiprop achieved the same feat in the 1500 metres from 2011 to 2015. Julius Yego is the country's only field event medallist, having won the men's javelin throw in 2015.

Former Kenyans have also had impacts for other nations at the championships, including 2007's double champion Bernard Lagat (United States), two-time steeplechase champion Saif Saaeed Shaheen (Qatar) and marathon winner Rose Chelimo (Bahrain).

== Medal table ==
Championships	Men			Women			Total					
Championships	Gold	Silver	Bronze	Gold	Silver	Bronze	Gold	Silver	Bronze	Total	Rank	Athletes
1983 Helsinki	0	0	0	0	0	0	0	0	0	0	-	
1987 Rome	3	0	0	0	0	0	3	0	0	3	5	
1991 Tokyo	4	3	0	0	0	1	4	3	1	8	4	
1993 Stuttgart	3	3	3	0	0	1	3	3	4	10	4	
1995 Gothenburg	2	1	2	0	0	1	2	1	3	6	6	
1997 Athens	2	2	2	1	0	0	3	2	2	7	4	
1999 Seville	1	4	0	0	0	1	1	4	1	6	13	
2001 Edmonton	3	3	2	0	0	0	3	3	2	8	3	
2003 Paris	1	1	0	1	0	1	2	1	1	4	7	
2005 Helsinki	1	1	3	0	1	1	1	2	4	7	9	
2007 Osaka	3	2	3	2	1	2	5	3	5	13	2	
2009 Berlin	2	3	1	2	3	0	4	6	1	11	3	43
2011 Daegu	4	3	0	3	5	3	7	8	3	18	2	47
2013 Moscow	2	1	2	3	3	1	5	4	3	12	4	49
2015 Beijing	5	4	2	2	2	1	7	6	3	16	1	52
2017 London	3	1	2	2	1	2	5	2	4	11	2	50
2019 Doha	2	0	3	3	2	1	5	2	4	11	2	42
2022 Eugene	1	2	1	1	3	2	2	5	3	10	4	44
2023 Budapest	0	2	2	3	1	2	3	3	4	10	5	52
2025 Tokyo	1	0	2	6	2	0	7	2	2	11	2	62
2027 Beijing	To be determined											
2029 Nairobi	To be determined											
2031 Munich	To be determined											
Total	43	36	30	29	24	20	72	60	50	182	2	

== Medalists ==
Athlete	Gold	Silver	Bronze	Total	Years
Faith Kipyegon	5	3	0	8	2015–2025
Ezekiel Kemboi	4	3	0	7	2003–2015
Vivian Cheruiyot	4	1	0	5	2007–2015
Moses Kiptanui	3	1	0	4	1991–1997
Asbel Kiprop	3	0	0	3	2011–2015
Conseslus Kipruto	2	2	1	5	2013–2022
Hellen Onsando Obiri	2	1	1	4	2013–2022
Beatrice Chebet	2	1	1	4	2022–2025
Catherine Ndereba	2	1	0	3	2003–2007
Edna Kiplagat	2	1	0	3	2011–2017
Billy Konchellah	2	0	1	3	1987–1993
Ismael Kirui	2	0	0	2	1993–1995
Abel Kirui	2	0	0	2	2009–2011
David Rudisha	2	0	0	2	2011–2015
Janeth Jepkosgei	1	2	0	3	2007–2011
Milcah Cheywa	1	2	0	3	2009–2013
Brimin Kiprop Kipruto	1	1	2	4	2005–2015
Moses Tanui	1	1	0	2	1991–1993
Christopher Koskei	1	1	0	2	1995–1999
Wilson Boit Kipketer	1	1	0	2	1997–1999
Benjamin Limo	1	1	0	2	1999–2005
Eliud Kipchoge	1	1	0	2	2003–2007
Alfred Kirwa Yego	1	1	0	2	2007–2009
Elijah Manangoi	1	1	0	2	2015–2017
Timothy Cheruiyot	1	1	0	2	2015–2019
Beatrice Chepkoech	1	1	0	2	2019–2023
Emmanuel Wanyonyi	1	1	0	2	2023–2025
Sally Barsosio	1	0	1	2	1993–1997
Linet Masai	1	0	1	2	2009–2011
Eunice Jepkoech Sum	1	0	1	2	2013–2015
Hyvin Jepkemoi	1	0	1	2	2015–2017
Mary Moraa	1	0	1	2	2022–2023
Faith Cherotich	1	0	1	2	2023–2025

== Doping ==
Compared to other successful nations, such as the United States and Russia, Kenya's athletes have been largely unaffected by doping failures at the competition. The nation's first failures at the championships occurred in 2015, neither of whom were finalists.

Year	Athlete	Event	Notes
2015	Francisca Koki	Women's 400 m hurdles	Heats only
2015	Joy Sakari	Women's 400 m	Semi-finalist
