= Portugal at the World Athletics Championships =

- Flag of Portugal
- WA code: POR
- Medals: Gold 9 Silver 7 Bronze 9 Total 25

World Athletics Championships appearances (overview)
- 1980; 1983; 1987; 1991; 1993; 1995; 1997; 1999; 2001; 2003; 2005; 2007; 2009; 2011; 2013; 2015; 2017; 2019; 2022; 2023; 2025

Portugal has contested every edition of World Athletics Championships, having won medals in nearly every edition. Its first world champion was Rosa Mota, when she won the women's marathon at the 1987 World Championships in Athletics. In the men's side, Nelson Évora became the first world champion, when he won the triple jump event in 2007.

== Medalists ==
Medal	Name	Year	Event
Gold	Rosa Mota	1987 Rome	Women's marathon
Silver	Domingos Castro	1987 Rome	Men's 5000 metres
Silver	Manuela Machado	1993 Stuttgard	Women's marathon
Gold	Manuela Machado	1995 Gothenburg	Women's marathon
Gold	Fernanda Ribeiro	1995 Gothenburg	Women's 10,000 metres
Silver	Fernanda Ribeiro	1995 Gothenburg	Women's 5000 metres
Bronze	Carla Sacramento	1995 Gothenburg	Women's 1500 metres
Gold	Carla Sacramento	1997 Athens	Women's 1500 metres
Silver	Fernanda Ribeiro	1997 Athens	Women's 10,000 metres
Silver	Manuela Machado	1997 Athens	Women's marathon
Bronze	Fernanda Ribeiro	1997 Athens	Women's 5000 metres
Bronze	Carlos Calado	2001 Edmonton	Men's long jump
Bronze	Rui Silva	2005 Helsinki	Men's 1500 metres
Bronze	Susana Feitor	2005 Helsinki	Women's 20 km walk
Gold	Nelson Évora	2007 Osaka	Men's triple jump
Silver	Nelson Évora	2009 Berlin	Men's triple jump
Bronze	Naide Gomes	2009 Berlin	Women's long jump
Bronze	João Vieira	2013 Moscow	Men's 20 km walk
Bronze	Nelson Évora	2015 Beijing	Men's triple jump
Gold	Inês Henriques	2017 London	Women's 50 km walk
Bronze	Nelson Évora	2017 London	Men's triple jump
Silver	João Vieira	2019 Doha	Men's 50 km walk
Gold	Pedro Pichardo	2022 Eugene	Men's triple jump
Gold	Isaac Nader	2025 Tokyo	Men's 1500 metres
Gold	Pedro Pichardo	2025 Tokyo	Men's triple jump

=== By event ===
Event	Gold	Silver	Bronze	Total
Triple Jump	3	1	2	6
Marathon	2	2	0	4
1500 metres	2	0	2	4
10,000 metres	1	1	0	2
50 km walk	1	1	0	2
5000 metres	0	2	1	3
20 km walk	0	0	2	2
Long jump	0	0	2	2
Totals (8 entries)	9	7	9	25

=== By gender ===
Gender	Gold	Silver	Bronze	Total
Women	5	4	4	13
Men	4	3	5	12

== See also ==
- Portugal at the Olympics
- Portugal at the Paralympics
