= Somalia at the World Athletics Championships =

- Flag of Somalia
- WA code: SOM
- Medals: Gold 0 Silver 0 Bronze 0 Total 0

World Athletics Championships appearances (overview)
- 1983; 1987; 1991; 1993; 1995; 1997; 1999; 2001; 2003; 2005; 2007; 2009; 2011; 2013; 2015; 2017; 2019; 2022; 2023; 2025

Somalia has participated in the World Athletics Championships since 1983.

== Results ==
=== 1983 ===
Men's track and road events
| Athlete | Event | Heat | | Semifinal | | Final | |
| Athlete | Event | Result | Rank | Result | Rank | Result | Rank |
|---|---|---|---|---|---|---|---|
| Jama Aden | 800 metres | 1:48.69 | 32 | Did not advance | | | |
| Jama Aden | 1500 metres | 3:46.87 | 40 | Did not advance | | | |

=== 2009 ===
Men's track and road events
| Event | Athletes | |
|---|---|---|
| Event | 5000 metres | Mohamed Ali Mohamed |

=== 2011 ===
Men's track and roads events
| Athlete | Event | Preliminaries | | Heats | | Semifinals | | Final | |
| Athlete | Event | Time Width Height | Rank | Time Width Height | Rank | Time Width Height | Rank | Time Width Height | Rank |
|---|---|---|---|---|---|---|---|---|---|
| Abdishakur Nageye Abdulle | 5000 metres | | | 15:13.64 PB | 35 | | | Did not advance | |

=== 2015 ===
Men's track and road events
| Athlete | Event | Heat | | Semifinal | | Final | |
| Athlete | Event | Result | Rank | Result | Rank | Result | Rank |
|---|---|---|---|---|---|---|---|
| Suleiman Abdille Borai | 5000 metres | 15:26.65 PB | 19 | —N/a | | Did not advance | |

=== 2017 ===
Men's track and road events
| Athlete | Event | Heat | | Final | |
| Athlete | Event | Result | Rank | Result | Rank |
|---|---|---|---|---|---|
| Mohamed Daud Mohamed | 5000 metres | 14:34.27 PB | 36 | Did not advance | |

=== 2019 ===
Men's track and road events
| Athlete | Event | Heat | | Semifinal | | Final | |
| Athlete | Event | Result | Rank | Result | Rank | Result | Rank |
|---|---|---|---|---|---|---|---|
| Abdullahi Jama Mohamed | 1500m | 3:40.84 | 12 | Did not advance | | | |

=== 2023 ===
Men's track and road events
| Athlete | Event | Final | |
| Athlete | Event | Result | Rank |
|---|---|---|---|
| Khadar Basheer Youssuf | Marathon | DNF | |
