= Hungary at the World Athletics Championships =

- WA code: HUN
- National federation: MASZ
- Website: atletika.hu
- Medals Ranked 72nd: Gold 0 Silver 7 Bronze 8 Total 15

World Athletics Championships appearances (overview)
- 1976; 1980; 1983; 1987; 1991; 1993; 1995; 1997; 1999; 2001; 2003; 2005; 2007; 2009; 2011; 2013; 2015; 2017; 2019; 2022; 2023; 2025

Hungary has competed in every World Athletics Championships, since the first edition in 1983, winning 15 medals, including 7 silver medals and 8 bronze medals to date.

== Athletics ==
All Hungarian medals till Budapest 2023.

Edition	Gold	Silver	Bronze	Total
(Japan) Tokyo 1991		Pole vault István Bagyula		2
(Japan) Tokyo 1991			Discus throw Attila Horváth	2
(Germany) Stuttgart 1993			Hammer throw Tibor Gécsek	1
(Sweden) Gothenburg 1995			Hammer throw Tibor Gécsek	2
(Sweden) Gothenburg 1995			Heptathlon; Rita Ináncsi	2
(Spain) Seville 1999		Hammer throw Zsolt Németh		1
(France) Paris 2003		Discus throw Róbert Fazekas		2
(France) Paris 2003		Hammer throw Adrián Annus		2
(Finland) Helsinki 2005			Decathlon; Attila Zsivoczky	1
(South Korea) Daegu 2011		Hammer throw Krisztián Pars		1
(Russia) Moscow 2013		Hammer throw Krisztián Pars		1
(United Kingdom) London 2017		Shot put Anita Márton		2
(United Kingdom) London 2017			110 metres hurdles Balázs Baji	2
(Qatar) Doha 2019			Hammer throw Bence Halász	1
(Hungary) Budapest 2023			Hammer throw Bence Halász	1
	0	7	8	15

== Medal tables ==
=== By championships ===
Games	Gold	Silver	Bronze	Total
(Finland) 1983 Helsinki	0	0	0	0
(Italy) 1987 Rome	0	0	0	0
(Japan) 1991 Tokyo	0	1	1	2
(Germany) 1993 Stuttgart	0	0	1	1
(Sweden) 1995 Gothenburg	0	0	2	2
(Greece) 1997 Athens	0	0	0	0
(Spain) 1999 Seville	0	1	0	1
(Canada) 2001 Edmonton	0	0	0	0
(France) 2003 Paris	0	2	0	2
(Finland) 2005 Helsinki	0	0	1	1
(Japan) 2007 Osaka	0	0	0	0
(Germany) 2009 Berlin	0	0	0	0
(South Korea) 2011 Daegu	0	1	0	1
(Russia) 2013 Moscow	0	1	0	1
(China) 2015 Beijing	0	0	0	0
(United Kingdom) 2017 London	0	1	1	2
(Qatar) 2019 Doha	0	0	1	1
(United States) 2021 Eugene	0	0	0	0
(Hungary) 2023 Budapest	0	0	1	1
(Japan) 2025 Tokyo	0	0	1	1
Totals (20 entries)	0	7	9	16

=== By type ===
Type	Gold	Silver	Bronze	Total
Field	0	7	5	12
Combined	0	0	2	2
Track	0	0	1	1
Totals (3 entries)	0	7	8	15

=== By athlete ===
Name	Gold	Silver	Bronze	Total
Krisztián Pars	0	2	0	2
Bence Halász	0	0	2	2
Tibor Gécsek	0	0	2	2
Totals (3 entries)	0	2	4	6

Only athletes with more than two medals

== See also ==
- Hungary at the IAAF World Indoor Championships in Athletics
- Hungary at the European Athletics Championships
- Hungary at the European Athletics Indoor Championships
