= Morocco at the World Athletics Championships =

- WA code: MAR
- National federation: Royal Moroccan Athletics Federation
- Medals Ranked 21st: Gold 12 Silver 13 Bronze 9 Total 34

World Athletics Championships appearances (overview)
- 1983; 1987; 1991; 1993; 1995; 1997; 1999; 2001; 2003; 2005; 2007; 2009; 2011; 2013; 2015; 2017; 2019; 2022; 2023; 2025

Morocco has participated in the World Athletics Championships since 1983. Their first ever medal was a Bronze medal won by Saïd Aouita in 1983 in Helsinki; in the Men's 1500 m. The first gold was claimed by Saïd Aouita in the 2nd World Championships in Rome, Italy.

== Medalists ==
Medal	Name	Year	Event	Date	Ref.
Gold	Saïd Aouita	(Italy) 1987 Rome	Men's 5000 metres	6 September 1987	
Gold	Hicham El Guerrouj	(Greece) 1997 Athens	Men's 1500 metres	6 August 1997	
Gold	Nezha Bidouane	(Greece) 1997 Athens	Women's 400 metres hurdles	6 August 1997	
Gold	Hicham El Guerrouj	(Spain) 1999 Seville	Men's 1500 metres	24 August 1999	
Gold	Salah Hissou	(Spain) 1999 Seville	Men's 5000 metres	28 August 1999	
Gold	Hicham El Guerrouj	(Canada) 2001 Alberta	Men's 1500 metres	12 August 2001	
Gold	Nezha Bidouane	(Canada) 2001 Alberta	Women's 400 metres hurdles	6 August 2001	
Gold	Hicham El Guerrouj	(France) 2003 Saint-Denis	Men's 1500 metres	27 August 2003	
Gold	Jaouad Gharib	(France) 2003 Saint-Denis	Men's marathon	30 August 2003	
Gold	Jaouad Gharib	(Finland) 2005 Helsinki	Men's marathon	13 August 2005	
Gold	Soufiane El Bakkali	(United States) 2022 Eugene	Men's 3000 metres steeplechase	18 July 2022	
Gold	Soufiane El Bakkali	(Hungary) 2023 Budapest	Men's 3000 metres steeplechase	22 August 2023	
Silver	Hicham El Guerrouj	(Sweden) 1995 Gothenburg	Men's 1500 metres	13 August 1995	
Silver	Khalid Bouhlami	(Sweden) 1995 Gothenburg	Men's 5000 metres	13 August 1995	
Silver	Khalid Skah	(Sweden) 1995 Gothenburg	Men's 10,000 metres	8 August 1995	
Silver	Khalid Boulami	(Greece) 1997 Athens	Men's 5000 metres	9 August 1997	
Silver	Zahra Ouaziz	(Spain) 1999 Seville	Women's 5000 metres	27 August 1999	
Silver	Nezha Bidouane	(Spain) 1999 Seville	Women's 400 metres hurdles	25 August 1999	
Silver	Ali Ezzine	(Canada) 2001 Alberta	Men's 3000 metres steeplechase	8 August 2001	
Silver	Hicham El Guerrouj	(France) 2003 Saint-Denis	Men's 5000 metres	31 August 2003	
Silver	Adil Kaouch	(Finland) 2005 Helsinki	Men's 1500 metres	10 August 2005	
Silver	Hasna Benhassi	(Finland) 2005 Helsinki	Women's 800 metres	9 August 2005	
Silver	Hasna Benhassi	(Japan) 2007 Osaka	Women's 800 metres	28 August 2007	
Silver	Soufiane El Bakkali	(United Kingdom) 2017 London	Men's 3000 metres steeplechase	8 August 2017	
Silver	Soufiane El Bakkali	(Japan) 2025 Tokyo	Men's 3000 metres steeplechase	15 September 2025	
Bronze	Brahim Boutayeb	(Japan) 1991 Tokyo	Men's 5000 metres	1 September 1991	
Bronze	Khalid Skah	(Japan) 1991 Tokyo	Men's 10,000 metres	26 August 1991	
Bronze	Saïd Aouita	(Finland) 1983 Helsinki	Men's 1500 metres	14 August 1983	
Bronze	Zahra Ouaziz	(Finland) 1983 Helsinki	Men's 5000 metres	12 August 1995	
Bronze	Salah Hissou	(Greece) 1997 Athens	Men's 10,000 metres	6 August 1997	
Bronze	Ali Ezzine	(Spain) 1999 Seville	Men's 3000 metres steeplechase	23 August 1999	
Bronze	Abdalaati Iguider	(China) 2015 Beijing	Men's 1500 metres	30 August 2015	
Bronze	Soufiane El Bakkali	(Qatar) 2019 Doha	Men's 3000 metres steeplechase	4 October 2019	
Bronze	Fatima Ezzahra Gardadi	(Hungary) 2023 Budapest	Women's marathon	26 August 2023	

== See also ==
- Morocco at the Olympics
- Morocco at the Paralympics
