= World Athletics Championships =

Biennial international athletics competition

- Date: Varying
- Frequency: Biennial
- Country: Varying
- Inaugurated: 1983
- Most recent: Tokyo 2025
- Next event: Beijing 2027
- Organiser: World Athletics
- Website: worldathletics.org/competitions/world-athletics-championships

The World Athletics Championships, known as the IAAF World Championships in Athletics until 2019, are a biennial athletics competition organized by World Athletics, formerly International Association of Athletics Federations. Alongside the Olympic Games, the championships represents the highest level of senior international outdoor athletics competition for track and field athletics globally, including marathon running and race walking. Separate World Championships are held by World Athletics for certain other outdoor events, including cross-country running and half-marathon, as well as indoor and age-group championship.

The World Championships were started in 1976 in response to the International Olympic Committee dropping the men's 50 km walk from the Olympic programme for the 1976 Montreal Olympics, despite its constant presence at the games since 1932. The IAAF chose to host its own world championship event, a month and a half after the Olympics. It was the first World Championships that the IAAF had hosted separately from the Olympic Games.

A second limited event was held in 1980, and the inaugural championships in 1983, with all the events, is considered the official start of the competition. Until 1980, the Olympic champions were also considered as reigning world champions.

At their debut, these championships were then held every four years, until 1991 when they switched to a two-year cycle. In 2024, World Athletics announced that the new biennial competition, World Athletics Ultimate Championship, featuring only up to 16 of the world's top-ranked athletes per discipline, would be held every even year from 2026 onwards.

== History ==
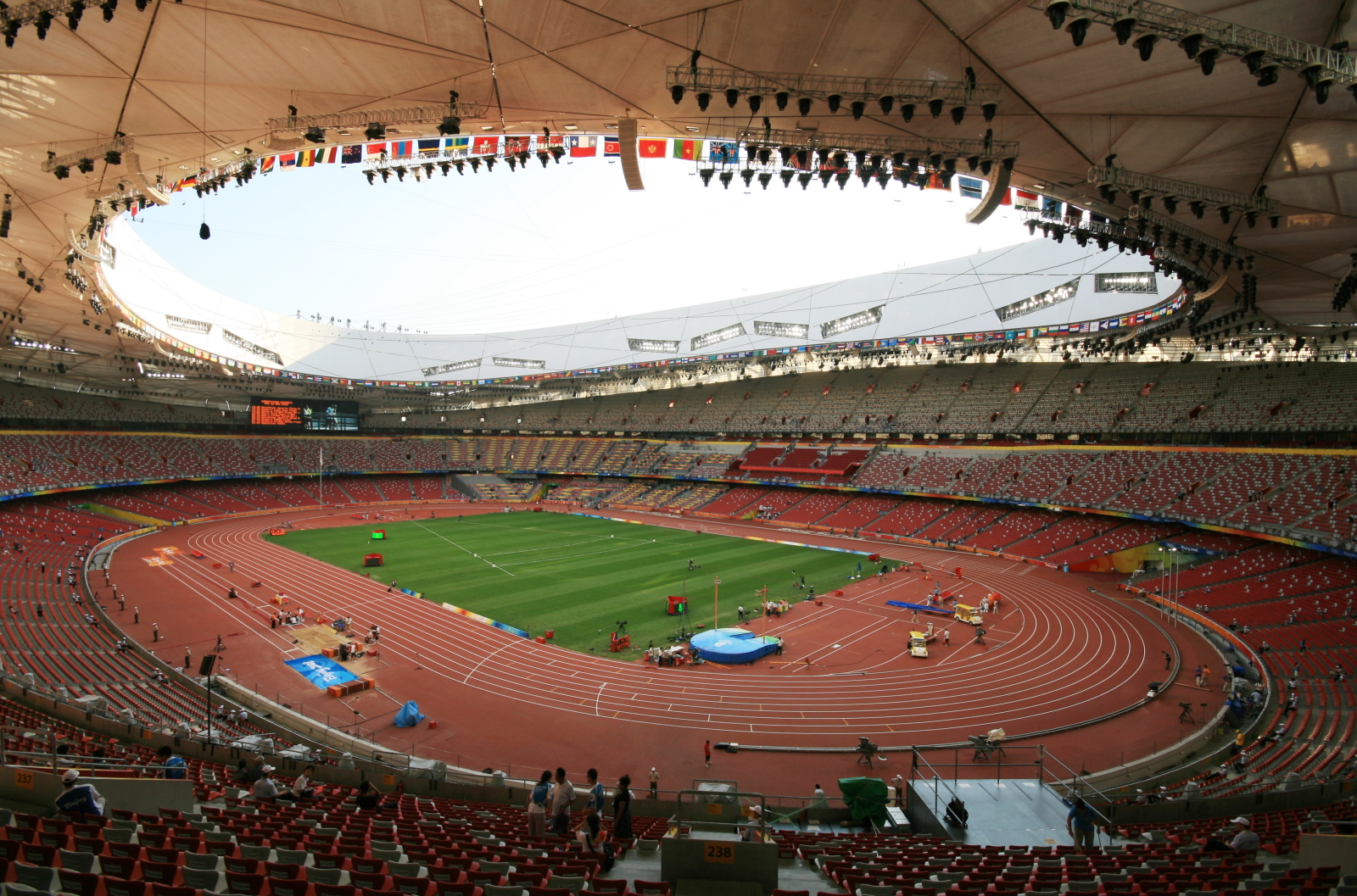

The idea of having an Athletics World Championships was around well before the competition's first event in 1983. In 1913, the IAAF decided that the Olympic Games would serve as the World Championships for athletics. This was considered suitable for over 50 years until in the late 1960s the desire of many IAAF members to have their own World Championships began to grow. In 1976 at the IAAF Council Meeting in Puerto Rico an Athletics World Championships separate from the Olympic Games was approved.

Following bids from both Stuttgart, West Germany and Helsinki, Finland, the IAAF Council awarded the inaugural competition to Helsinki, to take place in 1983 and be held in the Helsinki Olympic Stadium (where the 1952 Summer Olympics had been held).

Two IAAF world championship events preceded the inaugural edition of the World Championships in Athletics in 1983. The 1976 World Championships had just one event – the men's 50 kilometres walk which was dropped from the Olympic programme for the 1976 Summer Olympics and the IAAF responded by setting up their own contest. Four years later, the 1980 World Championships contained only two newly approved women's events, (400 metres hurdles and 3000 metres), neither of which featured on the programme for the 1980 Summer Olympics.

Over the years the competition has grown in size. In 1983 1,333 athletes from 153 countries participated. By the 2003 competition, in Paris, it had grown to 1,679 athletes from 198 countries with coverage being transmitted to 179 countries.

From 2019 to 2022 the championships were sponsored by Qatar National Bank.

There has also been a change in composition over the years, with several new events, all for women, being added. By 2005, the only differences were men's competition in the 50 km walk, and equivalent events in women's 100 m hurdles and heptathlon to men's 110 m hurdles and decathlon.

Changes in the list of events were as follows:

- 1987: women's 10,000 m and 10 km walk added
- 1993: women's triple jump added
- 1995: women's 3,000 m replaced by 5000 m
- 1999: women's pole vault and hammer added; women's 20 km walk replaced 10 km walk
- 2005: women's 3000 m steeplechase added
- 2017: women's 50 km walk added
- 2019: mixed 4 × 400 m relay added
- 2022: men's and women's 35 km walk replaced 50 km walk

== Championships ==
Ed.	Year	Host city	Host country	Date	Venue	Capacity	Events	Nations	Athletes	Top of the medal table
–	1976	Malmö	Sweden	18 Sep	Malmö Stadion	30,000	1	20	42	Soviet Union
–	1980	Sittard	Netherlands	14 – 16 Aug	De Baandert	22,000	2	22	42	East Germany
1	1983	Helsinki	Finland	7 – 14 Aug	Olympiastadion	50,000	41	153	1,333	East Germany
2	1987	Rome	Italy	28 Aug – 6 Sep	Stadio Olimpico	60,000	43	156	1,419	East Germany
3	1991	Tokyo	Japan	23 Aug – 1 Sep	National Stadium	48,000	43	162	1,491	United States
4	1993	Stuttgart	Germany	13 – 22 Aug	Neckarstadion	70,000	44	187	1,630	United States
5	1995	Gothenburg	Sweden	5 – 13 Aug	Ullevi	42,000	44	190	1,755	United States
6	1997	Athens	Greece	1 – 10 Aug	Olympiako Stadio	75,000	44	197	1,785	United States
7	1999	Seville	Spain	20 – 29 Aug	Estadio de La Cartuja	70,000	46	200	1,750	United States
8	2001	Edmonton	Canada	3 – 12 Aug	Commonwealth Stadium	60,000	46	189	1,602	Russia
9	2003	Paris	France	23 – 31 Aug	Stade de France	78,000	46	198	1,679	United States
10	2005	Helsinki	Finland	6 – 14 Aug	Olympiastadion	45,000	47	191	1,687	United States
11	2007	Osaka	Japan	24 Aug – 2 Sep	Yanmar Stadium Nagai	45,000	47	197	1,800	United States
12	2009	Berlin	Germany	15 – 23 Aug	Olympiastadion	74,000	47	200	1,895	United States
13	2011	Daegu	South Korea	27 Aug – 4 Sep	Daegu Stadium	65,000	47	199	1,742	United States
14	2013	Moscow	Russia	10 – 18 Aug	Luzhniki Stadium	78,000	47	203	1,784	United States
15	2015	Beijing	China	22 – 30 Aug	Beijing National Stadium	80,000	47	205	1,761	Kenya
16	2017	London	Great Britain	4 – 13 Aug	London Stadium	60,000	48	199	1,857	United States
17	2019	Doha	Qatar	27 Sep – 6 Oct	Khalifa International Stadium	48,000	49	206	1,775	United States
18	2022	Eugene	United States	15 – 24 Jul	Hayward Field	25,000	49	180	1,705	United States
19	2023	Budapest	Hungary	19 – 27 Aug	National Athletics Centre	36,000	49	195	1,994	United States
20	2025	Tokyo	Japan	13 – 21 Sep	Japan National Stadium	68,000	49	198	2,202	United States
21	2027	Beijing	China	10 – 19 Sep	Beijing National Stadium	80,000				
22	2029	Nairobi	Kenya	TBD	Kasarani Stadium	TBD				
23	2031	Munich	Germany	TBD	Olympiastadion	TBD				

== All-time medal table ==
Updated after the 2025 World Athletics Championships.

Rank	Nation	Gold	Silver	Bronze	Total
1	United States	211	139	119	469
2	Kenya	72	60	50	182
3	Russia	42	52	48	142
4	Jamaica	41	67	51	159
5	Germany	40	39	49	128
6	Ethiopia	35	40	33	108
7	(United Kingdom) Great Britain	33	43	50	126
8	Soviet Union	23	27	28	78
9	Cuba	23	25	18	66
10	China	22	28	29	79
11	East Germany	21	19	16	56
12	Poland	20	21	25	66
13	Australia	16	16	17	49
14	France	15	19	24	58
15	Czech Republic	15	5	9	29
16	Italy	14	21	23	58
17	Canada	14	19	18	51
18	Sweden	14	7	9	30
19	Spain	13	19	17	49
20	Ukraine	12	15	17	44
21	Morocco	12	13	9	34
22	South Africa	12	7	9	28
23	Norway	12	6	6	24
24	Belarus	10	11	12	33
25	Netherlands	9	11	14	34
26	Bahamas	9	9	8	26
27	Portugal	9	7	9	25
28	Japan	8	9	20	37
29	Bahrain	8	4	4	16
30	New Zealand	8	1	2	11
31	Finland	7	8	8	23
32	Uganda	7	2	4	13
33	Greece	6	8	12	26
34	Algeria	6	3	3	12
35	Romania	5	8	12	25
36	Bulgaria	5	3	8	16
37	Qatar	5	2	5	12
38	Switzerland	5	0	5	10
39	Trinidad and Tobago	4	6	7	17
40	Czechoslovakia	4	4	3	11
41	Croatia	4	4	2	10
42	Colombia	4	3	3	10
43	Dominican Republic	4	3	1	8
44	Ireland	4	3	0	7
45	Ecuador	4	2	2	8
46	Venezuela	4	0	2	6
47	Brazil	3	8	8	19
–	Authorised Neutral Athletes^{[1]}	3	8	1	12
48	Mexico	3	6	7	16
49	West Germany	3	6	3	12
50	Lithuania	3	4	3	10
51	Botswana	3	2	2	7
51	Grenada	3	2	2	7
53	Mozambique	3	1	1	5
54	Denmark	3	0	1	4
55	Estonia	2	6	2	10
56	Belgium	2	3	8	13
57	Slovenia	2	2	4	8
58	Peru	2	1	0	3
58	Tajikistan	2	1	0	3
60	Nigeria	1	6	5	12
61	Namibia	1	4	1	6
62	Kazakhstan	1	3	5	9
63	Turkey	1	3	0	4
64	Zambia	1	2	0	3
65	Burkina Faso	1	1	1	3
65	India	1	1	1	3
65	Tanzania	1	1	1	3
65	Tunisia	1	1	1	3
69	Eritrea	1	1	0	2
69	Panama	1	1	0	2
71	Saint Kitts and Nevis	1	0	4	5
71	Serbia	1	0	4	5
71	Slovakia	1	0	4	5
74	Barbados	1	0	2	3
74	Syria	1	0	2	3
76	Senegal	1	0	1	2
76	Somalia	1	0	1	2
78	North Korea	1	0	0	1
79	Hungary	0	7	9	16
80	Ivory Coast	0	4	1	5
80	Puerto Rico	0	4	1	5
82	Israel	0	3	2	5
83	Burundi	0	2	1	3
83	Djibouti	0	2	1	3
83	Latvia	0	2	1	3
83	South Korea	0	2	1	3
87	Cameroon	0	2	0	2
88	Austria	0	1	3	4
89	Bosnia and Herzegovina	0	1	1	2
89	Cyprus	0	1	1	2
89	Dominica	0	1	1	2
89	Ghana	0	1	1	2
89	Philippines	0	1	1	2
89	Sri Lanka	0	1	1	2
89	Suriname	0	1	1	2
96	Bermuda	0	1	0	1
96	British Virgin Islands	0	1	0	1
96	Egypt	0	1	0	1
96	Pakistan	0	1	0	1
96	Sudan	0	1	0	1
101	American Samoa	0	0	1	1
101	Cayman Islands	0	0	1	1
101	Haiti	0	0	1	1
101	Iran	0	0	1	1
101	Saint Lucia	0	0	1	1
101	Samoa	0	0	1	1
101	Saudi Arabia	0	0	1	1
101	Uruguay	0	0	1	1
101	Zimbabwe	0	0	1	1
Totals (109 entries)		927	933	931	2,791

Source: World Athletics Championships Budapest 23 – Statistical Booklet 2023 Medal Table 2025 Medal Table

Notes

^[1] ANA is the name under which Russian athletes competed in the 2017 and 2019 Championships. Their medals were not included in the official medal table.

== All-time placing table ==
In the IAAF placing table the total score is obtained from assigning eight points to the first place and so on to one point for the eight placed finalists. Points are shared in situations where a tie occurs. However, the IAAF site shows all points rounded to the nearest integer.

Updated after the 2022 Championships

Rank	Country	1st place, gold medalist(s)	2nd place, silver medalist(s)	3rd place, bronze medalist(s)	4	5	6	7	8	Medals	Points
1	United States	183	125+1=	103+2=	77+5=	90+3=	84+3=	74+2=	80+4=	414	4240.5
2	Germany^{[a]}	63	61	65+2=	78+2=	66+2=	61+2=	53+5=	45+1=	191	2347.5
3	Russia^{[b]}	45	54+6=	47+2=	56+2=	39+3=	43+2=	35+1=	40+1=	154	1771.5
4	Kenya	62	55	44	48	40	28	47	21	161	1744
5	Jamaica	37	56	43+1=	34	31	29	31	24	137	1418.5
6	(United Kingdom) Great Britain	31	37	43	43+2=	50+1=	34+1=	31+1=	21	111	1381
7	Ethiopia	33	34	28	26	21	18	20	20	95	998
8	China	22	25+1=	25	20	34+1=	21+1=	21	24+1=	73	879
9	France	14	18	21+2=	27	28+2=	31+1=	24+1=	32+1=	55	804.1
10	Poland	20	17+1=	21+4=	23+1=	24	22+2=	27	21+2=	63	794.8
11	Soviet Union	23	25+2=	28	21+1=	17	12	11	17+1=	78	793
12	Cuba	22	23+1=	13+1=	33	10+2=	17+1=	23	19	60	757.5
13	Italy	12	15+1=	19	15	17+2=	24+1=	32+2=	30+2=	47	642.5
14	Spain	7	17+1=	15+1	19	20	24	18	20	41	580
15	Ukraine	11	12+2=	16	19	21	16+1=	21+1=	9	41	561.6

Notes

- ^[a] including points earned by athletes from East Germany (510 pts) and West Germany (191.5 pts) at the 1976, 1980, 1983 and 1987 Championships.
- ^[b] including points earned by Authorised Neutral Athletes (103.5 pts) at the 2017 and 2019 Championships.

== Multiple winners ==
Boldface denotes active athletes and highest medal count among all athletes (including these who not included in these tables) per type.

=== Men ===
==== All events ====
Rank	Athlete	Country	Events	From	To	Gold	Silver	Bronze	Total
1	Usain Bolt	Jamaica	100 m / 200 m / 4 × 100 m relay	2007	2017	**11**	2	1	**14**
2	LaShawn Merritt	United States	400 m / 4 × 400 m relay	2005	2015	8 *	3	–	11 *
3	Carl Lewis	United States	100 m / 200 m / 4 × 100 m relay / Long jump	1983	1993	8	1	1	10
3	**Noah Lyles**	United States	100 m / 200 m / 4 × 100 m relay	2019	2025	8	1	1	10
5	Michael Johnson	United States	200 m / 400 m / 4 × 400 m relay	1991	1999	8	–	–	8
6	Mo Farah	(United Kingdom) Great Britain	5000 m / 10,000 m	2011	2017	6	2	–	8
7	Sergey Bubka	Soviet Union; Ukraine	Pole vault	1983	1997	6	–	–	6
8	Jeremy Wariner	United States	400 m / 4 × 400 m relay	2005	2009	5	1	–	6
9	**Kenenisa Bekele**	Ethiopia	5000 m / 10,000 m	2003	2009	5	–	1	6
9	Lars Riedel	Germany	Discus throw	1991	2001	5	–	1	6

* including one medal in the relay event in which he participated in the heats only

==== Individual events ====
Rank	Athlete	Country	Events	From	To	Gold	Silver	Bronze	Total
1	Usain Bolt	Jamaica	100 m / 200 m	2007	2017	**7**	1	1	**9**
2	Mo Farah	(United Kingdom) Great Britain	5000 m / 10,000 m	2011	2017	6	2	–	8
3	Sergey Bubka	Soviet Union; Ukraine	Pole vault	1983	1997	6	–	–	6
3	Michael Johnson	United States	200 m / 400 m	1991	1999	6	–	–	6
5	Carl Lewis	United States	100 m / 200 m / Long jump	1983	1993	5	1	1	7
6	**Kenenisa Bekele**	Ethiopia	5000 m / 10,000 m	2003	2009	5	–	1	6
6	**Noah Lyles**	United States	100 m / 200 m	2019	2025	5	–	1	6
6	Lars Riedel	Germany	Discus throw	1991	2001	5	–	1	6
9	**Paweł Fajdek**	Poland	Hammer throw	2013	2022	5	–	–	5
10	Ezekiel Kemboi	Kenya	3000 m steeplechase	2003	2015	4	3	–	7

=== Women ===
==== All events ====
Rank	Athlete	Country	Events	From	To	Gold	Silver	Bronze	Total
1	Allyson Felix	United States	200 m / 400 m / 4 × 100 m relay / 4 × 400 m relay / 4 × 400 m mixed relay	2005	2022	14 **	3	3	20 **
2	Shelly-Ann Fraser-Pryce	Jamaica	100 m / 200 m / 4 × 100 m relay	2007	2025	10	6 *	1	17 *
3	Gail Devers	United States	100 m / 100 m hurdles / 4 × 100 m relay	1991	2001	5	3	–	8
3	**Faith Kipyegon**	Kenya	1500 m / 5000 m	2015	2025	5	3	–	8
5	Sanya Richards-Ross	United States	400 m / 4 × 400 m relay	2003	2015	5	2	–	7
6	Jessica Beard	United States	4 × 400 m relay / 4 × 400 m mixed relay	2009	2019	5 ***	1 *	–	6 ****
6	Tirunesh Dibaba	Ethiopia	5000 m / 10,000 m	2003	2017	5	1	–	6
6	Natasha Hastings	United States	4 × 400 m relay	2007	2017	5 ****	1	–	6 ****
6	**Sydney McLaughlin-Levrone**	United States	400 m / 400 m hurdles / 4 × 400 m relay	2019	2025	5	1	–	6
10	**Melissa Jefferson-Wooden**	United States	100 m / 200 m / 4 × 100 m relay	2022	2025	5 *	–	–	5 *

* including one medal in the relay event in which she participated in the heats only
** including two medals in the relay events in which she participated in the heats only
*** including three medals in the relay events in which she participated in the heats only
**** including four medals in the relay events in which she participated in the heats only

==== Individual events ====
Rank	Athlete	Country	Events	From	To	Gold	Silver	Bronze	Total
1	Shelly-Ann Fraser-Pryce	Jamaica	100 m / 200 m	2009	2023	**6**	1	1	8
2	**Faith Kipyegon**	Kenya	1500 m / 5000 m	2015	2025	5	3	–	8
3	Tirunesh Dibaba	Ethiopia	5000 m / 10,000 m	2003	2017	5	1	–	6
4	Gail Devers	United States	100 m / 100 m hurdles	1991	2001	4	2	–	6
5	Allyson Felix	United States	200 m / 400 m	2005	2017	4	1	2	7
6	Valerie Adams (Vili)	New Zealand	Shot put	2005	2013	4	1	–	5
6	Vivian Cheruiyot	Kenya	5000 m / 10,000 m	2007	2015	4	1	–	5
6	**Liu Hong**	China	20 km walk	2009	2019	4	1	–	5
9	**Yulimar Rojas**	Venezuela	Triple jump	2017	2025	4	–	1	5
10	Jackie Joyner-Kersee	United States	Heptathlon / Long jump	1987	1993	4	–	–	4
10	**María Pérez**	Spain	20 km walk / 35 km walk	2023	2025	4	–	–	4
10	Brittney Reese	United States	Long jump	2009	2017	4	–	–	4
10	**Anita Włodarczyk**	Poland	Hammer throw	2009	2017	4	–	–	4

== Multiple medalists ==
There are 49 athletes (21 men and 28 women) that have won at least 6 medals.

=== Men ===
Athlete	Country	Events	Gold	Silver	Bronze	Total
Usain Bolt	Jamaica	3	11	2	1	14
LaShawn Merritt	United States	2	8	3	0	11
Carl Lewis	United States	4	8	1	1	10
Noah Lyles	United States	3	8	1	1	10
Justin Gatlin	United States	3	4	6	0	10
Michael Johnson	United States	3	8	0	0	8
Mo Farah	(United Kingdom) Great Britain & N.I.	2	6	2	0	8
Christian Coleman	United States	2	4	3	0	7
Ezekiel Kemboi	Kenya	1	4	3	0	7
Haile Gebrselassie	Ethiopia	2	4	2	1	7
Rai Benjamin	United States	2	3	3	1	7
Sergey Bubka	Soviet Union / Ukraine	1	6	0	0	6
Jeremy Wariner	United States	2	5	1	0	6
Kenenisa Bekele	Ethiopia	2	5	0	1	6
Lars Riedel	Germany	1	5	0	1	6
Hicham El Guerrouj	Morocco	2	4	2	0	6
Vernon Norwood	United States	2	4	1	1	6
Butch Reynolds	United States	2	3	2	1	6
Bernard Lagat	Kenya / United States	2	2	3	1	6
Andre De Grasse	Canada	3	1	2	3	6
Greg Haughton	Jamaica	2	0	4	2	6

=== Women ===
Athlete	Country	Events	Gold	Silver	Bronze	Total
Allyson Felix	United States	5	14	3	3	20
Shelly-Ann Fraser-Pryce	Jamaica	3	10	6	1	17
Merlene Ottey	Jamaica	3	3	4	7	14
Shericka Jackson	Jamaica	5	4	4	4	12
Veronica Campbell Brown	Jamaica	3	3	7	1	11
Jearl Miles Clark	United States	2	4	3	2	9
Gail Devers	United States	3	5	3	0	8
Faith Kipyegon	Kenya	2	5	3	0	8
Gwen Torrence	United States	4	3	4	1	8
Gong Lijiao	China	1	2	2	4	8
Christine Ohuruogu	(United Kingdom) Great Britain	2	2	1	5	8
Sanya Richards-Ross	United States	2	5	2	0	7
Femke Bol	Netherlands	3	3	3	1	7
Carmelita Jeter	United States	3	3	1	3	7
Yuliya Pechonkina (Nosova)	Russia	2	2	3	2	7
Beverly McDonald	Jamaica	2	1	4	2	7
Lorraine Fenton (Graham)	Jamaica	2	1	3	3	7
Jessica Beard	United States	2	5	1	0	6
Tirunesh Dibaba	Ethiopia	2	5	1	0	6
Natasha Hastings	United States	1	5	1	0	6
Sydney McLaughlin-Levrone	United States	3	5	1	0	6
Kerron Stewart	Jamaica	2	3	3	0	6
Heike Drechsler (Daute)	East Germany / Germany	3	2	2	2	6
Sifan Hassan	Netherlands	3	2	1	3	6
Novlene Williams-Mills	Jamaica	2	1	4	1	6
Dina Asher-Smith	(United Kingdom) Great Britain	3	1	3	2	6
Irina Privalova	Soviet Union / Russia	4	1	3	2	6
Grit Breuer	Germany	3	1	2	3	6

== Athletes with most appearances ==
There are 28 athletes (12 men and 16 women) that have competed in at least nine editions.

App.	Name	Country	Years contested	Events
14	João Vieira	Portugal	99, 01, 03, 05, 07, 09, 11, 13, 15, 17, 19, 22, 23, 25	20 km walk / 35 km walk / 50 km walk
13	Jesús Ángel García	Spain	93, 95, 97, 99, 01, 03, 05, 07, 09, 11, 13, 15, 19	50 km walk
12	Bat-Ochir Ser-Od	Mongolia	03, 05, 07, 09, 11, 13, 15, 17, 19, 22, 23, 25	Marathon
11	Susana Feitor	Portugal	91, 93, 95, 97, 99, 01, 03, 05, 07, 09, 11	10 km walk / 20 km walk
11	Mélina Robert-Michon	France	01, 03, 07, 09, 13, 15, 17, 19, 22, 23, 25	Discus throw
11	Inês Henriques	Portugal	01, 05, 07, 09, 11, 13, 15, 17, 19, 22, 23	20 km walk / 35 km walk / 50 km walk
10	Franka Dietzsch	Germany	91, 93, 95, 97, 99, 01, 03, 05, 07, 09	Discus throw
10	Nicoleta Grasu	Romania	93, 95, 97, 99, 01, 05, 07, 09, 11, 13	Discus throw
10	Virgilijus Alekna	Lithuania	95, 97, 99, 01, 03, 05, 07, 09, 11, 13	Discus throw
10	Kim Collins	Saint Kitts and Nevis	95, 97, 99, 01, 03, 05, 07, 09, 11, 15	100 m / 200 m / 4x100 m
10	Allyson Felix	United States	03, 05, 07, 09, 11, 13, 15, 17, 19, 22	200 m / 400 m / 4x100 m / 4x400 m / 4x400 m mixed
10	Gong Lijiao	China	07, 09, 11, 13, 15, 17, 19, 22, 23, 25	Shot put
10	Donald Thomas	Bahamas	07, 09, 11, 13, 15, 17, 19, 22, 23, 25	High jump
9	Laverne Eve	Bahamas	87, 91, 95, 97, 99, 01, 03, 05, 07	Javelin throw
9	Tim Berrett	Canada	91, 93, 95, 97, 99, 01, 03, 05, 07	20 km walk / 50 km walk
9	Jackie Edwards	Bahamas	91, 93, 95, 97, 99, 01, 03, 05, 07	Long jump / Triple jump
9	Maria Mutola	Mozambique	91, 93, 95, 97, 99, 01, 03, 05, 07	800 m
9	Elisângela Adriano	Brazil	91, 93, 97, 01, 03, 05, 07, 09, 11	Shot put / Discus throw
9	Venelina Veneva-Mateeva	Bulgaria	91, 95, 99, 01, 03, 05, 09, 11, 15	High jump
9	Danny McFarlane	Jamaica	93, 95, 97, 99, 01, 03, 05, 07, 09	400 m / 400 m hurdles / 4x400 m
9	Hatem Ghoula	Tunisia	93, 95, 97, 99, 01, 03, 05, 07, 13	20 km walk
9	Debbie Ferguson-McKenzie	Bahamas	95, 97, 99, 01, 03, 07, 09, 11, 13	100 m / 200 m / 4x100 m
9	Nicola Vizzoni	Italy	97, 99, 01, 03, 05, 07, 09, 11, 13	Hammer throw
9	Chris Brown	Bahamas	99, 01, 03, 05, 07, 09, 11, 13, 15	400 m / 4x400 m
9	Zhang Wenxiu	China	01, 03, 05, 07, 09, 11, 13, 15, 17	Hammer throw
9	Andrés Chocho	Ecuador	07, 09, 11, 13, 15, 17, 19, 22, 23	20 km walk / 35 km walk / 50 km walk
9	Shelly-Ann Fraser-Pryce	Jamaica	07, 09, 11, 13, 15, 19, 22, 23, 25	100 m / 200 m / 4x100 m
9	Bianca Ghelber (Perie)	Romania	07, 09, 11, 13, 17, 19, 22, 23, 25	Hammer throw

== World records ==
A total of 37 world records have been set or equalled at the competition: 19 by men, 15 by women, and 3 in the mixed relay.

The first world record to be set at the World Championships was by Jarmila Kratochvílová of Czechoslovakia, who ran 47.99 seconds to win the 1983 women's 400 m final.

A peak of five world records came at the 1993 Championships.

The most recent world record was in the men's pole vault final in 2025, when the Swedish Armand Duplantis cleared 6.30 m. World records have become less common as the history of the event has expanded, with no world records set in the 1997, 2001, 2007 or 2013 editions.

American athletes have been the most successful with fifteen world records, followed by Jamaica and Great Britain on four each. Jamaican sprinter Usain Bolt has broken the most world records at the competition, at four, while American Carl Lewis set three. Jonathan Edwards holds the distinction of breaking the world record twice in one championships: improving upon his own newly-set world record in the 1995 men's triple jump final while Armand Duplantis broke the men's pole vault world record twice on two separate championships, first in 2022 and later in 2025. The men's 4 × 100 metres relay has yielded the most world records, with five set between 1983 and 2011.

Ben Johnson's time of 9.83 seconds at the 1987 World Championships men's 100 m final was initially considered to be a world record, but this was rescinded in 1989 after Johnson admitted to steroid use between 1981 and 1988.

Also, the 2009 Jamaican men's 4 × 100 metres relay team time of 37.31 seconds was retrospectively recognised to as the world record after the team's time of 37.10 at the 2008 Olympics was rescinded after the disqualification of Nesta Carter (who was not present in the World Championships team).

Sex	Event	Record	Athlete	Nation	Date	Year
Women	400 metres	47.99	Jarmila Kratochvílová	Czechoslovakia	10 August	1983
Men	4 × 100 metres relay	37.86	Emmit King; Willie Gault; Calvin Smith; Carl Lewis	United States	10 August	1983
Women	High jump	2.09 m	Stefka Kostadinova	Bulgaria	30 August	1987
Men	100 metres	9.86	Carl Lewis	United States	25 August	1991
Men	Long jump	8.95 m	Mike Powell	United States	30 August	1991
Men	4 × 100 metres relay	37.50	Andre Cason; Leroy Burrell; Dennis Mitchell; Carl Lewis	United States	1 September	1991
Women	400 metres hurdles	52.74	Sally Gunnell	(United Kingdom) Great Britain	19 August	1993
Men	110 metres hurdles	12.91	Colin Jackson	(United Kingdom) Great Britain	20 August	1993
Men	4 × 100 metres relay	37.40	Jon Drummond; Andre Cason; Dennis Mitchell; Leroy Burrell	United States	21 August	1993
Women	Triple jump	15.09 m	Anna Biryukova	Russia	21 August	1993
Men	4 × 400 metres relay	2:54.29	Andrew Valmon; Quincy Watts; Butch Reynolds; Michael Johnson	United States	22 August	1993
Men	Triple jump	18.16 m	Jonathan Edwards	(United Kingdom) Great Britain	7 August	1995
Men	Triple jump	18.29 m	Jonathan Edwards	(United Kingdom) Great Britain	7 August	1995
Women	Triple jump	15.50 m	Inessa Kravets	Ukraine	10 August	1995
Women	400 metres hurdles	52.61	Kim Batten	United States	11 August	1995
Women	Pole vault	4.60 m	Stacy Dragila	United States	21 August	1999
Men	400 metres	43.18	Michael Johnson	United States	26 August	1999
Men	20 kilometres race walk	1:17:21	Jefferson Pérez	Ecuador	23 August	2003
Men	50 kilometres race walk	3:36:03	Robert Korzeniowski	Poland	27 August	2003
Women	20 kilometres race walk	1:25:41	Olimpiada Ivanova	Russia	7 August	2005
Women	Pole vault	5.01 m	Yelena Isinbaeva	Russia	12 August	2005
Women	Javelin throw	71.70 m	Osleidys Menéndez	Cuba	14 August	2005
Men	100 metres	9.58	Usain Bolt	Jamaica	16 August	2009
Men	200 metres	19.19	Usain Bolt	Jamaica	20 August	2009
Women	Hammer throw	77.96 m	Anita Włodarczyk	Poland	22 August	2009
Men	4 × 100 metres relay	37.31	Steve Mullings; Michael Frater; Usain Bolt; Asafa Powell	Jamaica	22 August	2009
Men	4 × 100 metres relay	37.04	Nesta Carter; Michael Frater; Yohan Blake; Usain Bolt	Jamaica	4 September	2011
Men	Decathlon	9,045 pts	Ashton Eaton	United States	29 August	2015
Women	50 kilometres race walk	4:05:56	Inês Henriques	Portugal	13 August	2017
Mixed	4 × 400 metres relay	3:12.42	Tyrell Richard; Jessica Beard; Jasmine Blocker; Obi Igbokwe	United States	28 September	2019
Mixed	4 × 400 metres relay	3:09.34	Wilbert London III; Allyson Felix; Courtney Okolo; Michael Cherry	United States	29 September	2019
Women	400 metres hurdles	52.16	Dalilah Muhammad	United States	4 October	2019
Women	400 metres hurdles	50.68	Sydney McLaughlin	United States	22 July	2022
Women	100 metres hurdles	12.12	Tobi Amusan	Nigeria	24 July	2022
Men	Pole vault	6.21 m	Armand Duplantis	Sweden	24 July	2022
Mixed	4 × 400 metres relay	3:08.80	Justin Robinson; Rosey Effiong; Matthew Boling; Alexis Holmes	United States	19 August	2023
Men	Pole vault	6.30 m	Armand Duplantis	Sweden	15 September	2025

== See also ==
- World Athletics Indoor Championships
- IAAF Hall of Fame
- IAAF Athlete of the Year
- International Athletics Championships and Games
- World Para Athletics Championships
- List of World Athletics Championships medalists (men)
- List of World Athletics Championships medalists (women)
