= 2029 World Athletics Championships =

Swahili: Mashindano ya Dunia ya Riadha ya 2029

World Athletics Championships Nairobi 2029
- Host city: Nairobi
- Country: Kenya
- Organizers: World Athletics, Athletics Kenya
- Edition: 22nd
- Nations: TBD
- Athletes: TBD
- Sport: Athletics
- Events: TBD
- Dates: September 2029
- Opened by: TBD
- Closed by: World Athletics President TBD
- Main venue: Moi International Sports Centre

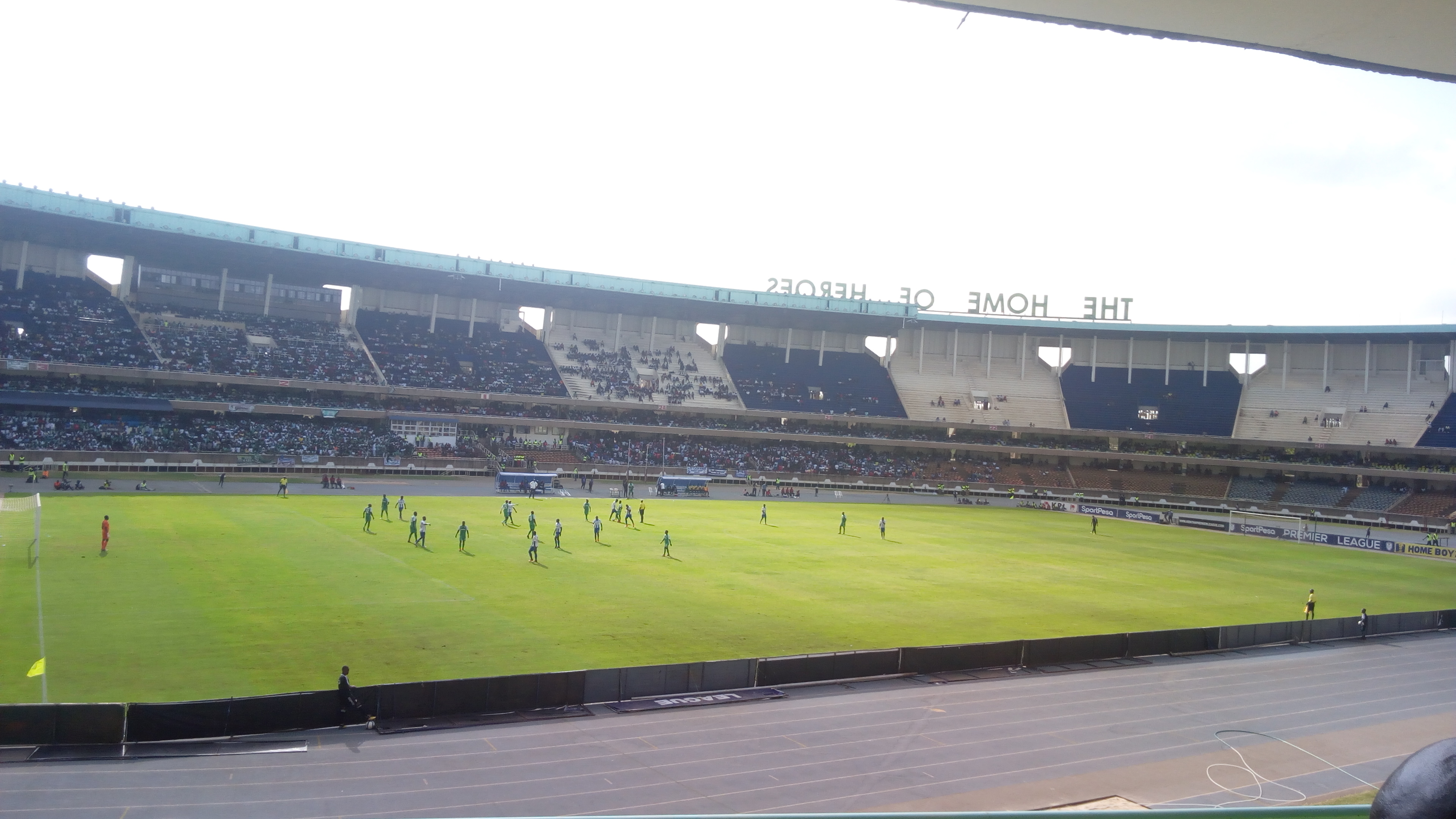
Moi International Sports Centre, 2017

The 2029 World Athletics Championships (Swahili: Mashindano ya Dunia ya Riadha ya 2029) will be the twenty-second edition of the World Athletics Championships, and will be held in 2029 in Nairobi, Kenya. This will be the first time the event will be held in Africa.

There have been concerns voiced by WADA around the ability of Kenya to provide appropriate doping controls and testing facilities during the championships.

The Kasarani Stadium (also called Moi International Sports Centre) is being used as the venue, following its planned renovation ahead of the 2027 Africa Cup of Nations.

== Host selection and venue ==
Four cities were in the running to host.

- Munich, Germany (Olympiastadion)
- Nairobi, Kenya (Kasarani Stadium)
- Rome, Italy (Stadio Olimpico)
- London, United Kingdom (London Stadium)

On 15 September 2026, Nairobi was selected to host the 2029 World Athletics Championships. Nairobi previously bid for 2025 but lost out to Tokyo.

== Participating nations ==
- Kenya (TBD) (hosts)
