= 2027 World Athletics Championships =

Athletics competition in Beijing, China

World Athletics Championships Beijing 2027
- Host city: Beijing
- Country: China
- Motto: Every Step Counts
- Organisers: World Athletics, Chinese Athletic Association
- Edition: 21st
- Events: 49
- Dates: 10–19 September 2027
- Main venue: Beijing National Stadium

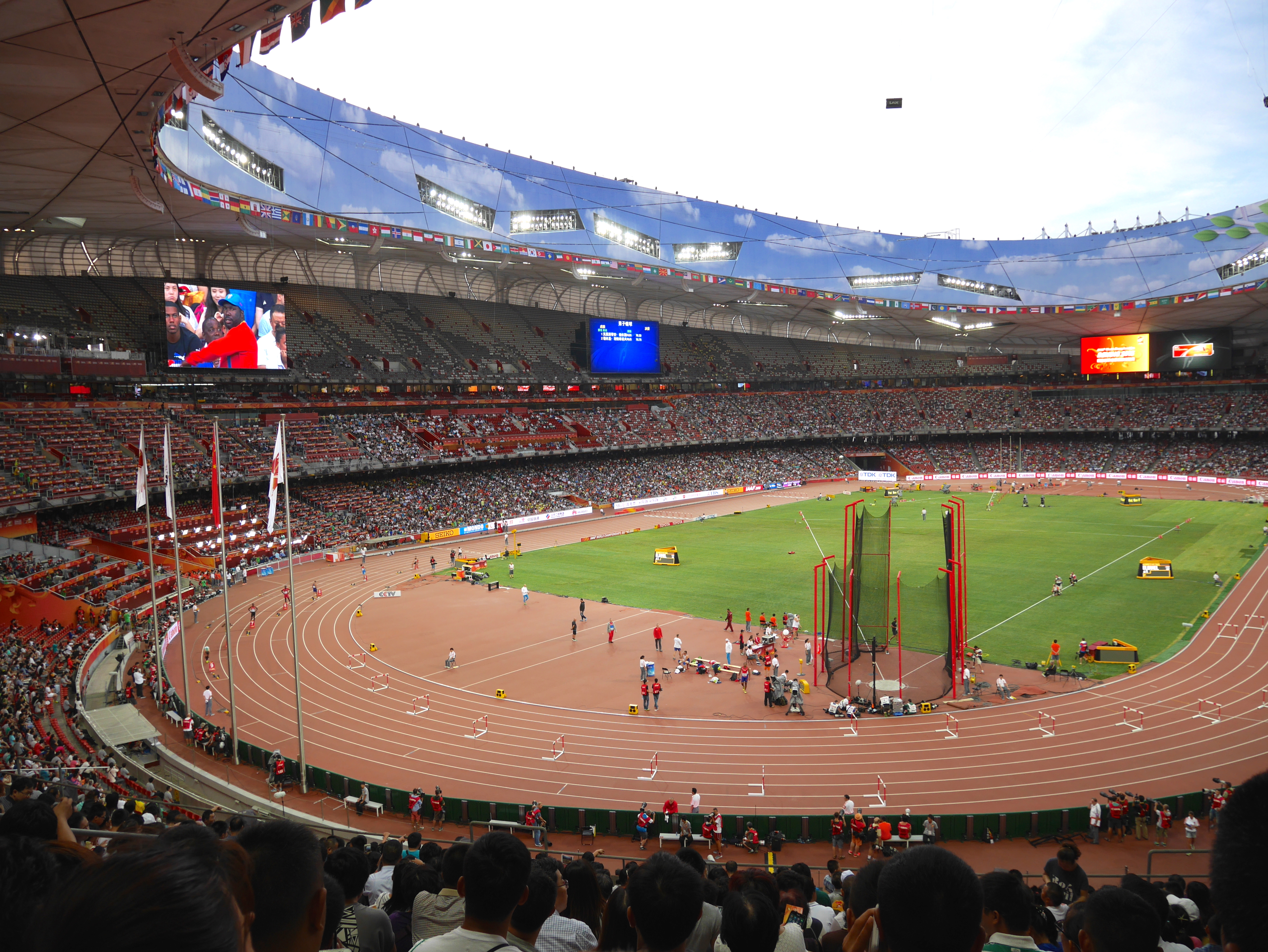
Beijing National Stadium, 2015

The 2027 World Athletics Championships (Chinese: 2027年世界田径锦标赛) will be the twenty-first edition of the World Athletics Championships and are scheduled to be held from 10 to 19 September 2027 in the National Stadium in Beijing, China. It will be the second time Beijing has hosted the event following the 2015 edition.

== Host selection ==
Cities that expressed interest in hosting the 2027 World Championships were Beijing, Istanbul, Turkey; Rome, Italy; London, United Kingdom; and Nairobi, Kenya, the latter two both eventually declining to bid. When the Italian Athletics Federation withdrew its candidacy after the government declined to fund the event on 28 February 2024, World Athletics president Sebastian Coe announced the decision to award the championships to Beijing.

== Venue ==
The track and field events are scheduled to be in the Beijing National Stadium in China.

== Qualification ==
World Athletics approved the timetable and qualification system for the 2027 World Athletics Championships on 26 May 2026.

=== Window ===
The qualifying window for the marathon is 3 November 2025 to midnight on 2 May 2027. For the 10,000 m, race walks, combined events and relays, the window runs from 23 February 2026 to midnight on 22 August 2027. For all other events, entry standards can be achieved from 23 August 2026 to midnight on 22 August 2027.

=== Entry standards ===
The qualification system for the championships is based on a combination of entry standards and world rankings. The entry standards were set with the aim of qualifying about 40% of the athletes.

Area champions in individual events, except for the marathons, will be considered as having met the qualification criteria for the World Championships provided there is no other qualified athlete entered from the same area in the same event. The top five finishers at Platinum Label marathons held during the qualification period and the winners of Gold Label marathons held in 2027 until 2 May will be considered as having achieved the qualification requirements.

The 2026 World Athletics Relays in Gaborone, Botswana were used as a qualifying event for the relays, with the top 12 teams in each event securing their place at the World Championships.The remaining four places in each relay discipline will be allocated to the best-ranked teams at the end of the qualification period, based on top lists.

Event	Men	Quota	Women	Quota
100 metres	9.95	48	10.96	48
200 metres	20.07	48	22.45	48
400 metres	44.45	48	50.00	48
800 metres	1:43.00	56	1:57.50	56
1500 metres	3:30.00	56	3:58.00	56
5000 metres / 5 km road	12:50.00	42	14:36.00	42
10,000 metres / 10 km road	26:48.00	27	30:40.00	27
Marathon	2:06:00	100	2:23:20	100
3000 metres steeplechase	8:08.00	36	9:06.50	36
110/100 metres hurdles	13.18	40	12.60	40
400 metres hurdles	48.00	40	54.00	40
High jump	2.30	36	1.96	36
Pole vault	5.90	36	4.75	36
Long jump	8.25	36	6.86	36
Triple jump	17.35	36	14.40	36
Shot put	21.50	36	19.30	36
Discus throw	67.20	36	64.50	36
Hammer throw	78.30	36	74.00	36
Javelin throw	85.50	36	63.40	36
Decathlon / Heptathlon	8820	24	6550	24
Half Marathon Race Walk	1:23:00	50	1:33:10	50
Marathon Race Walk	3:01:00	50	3:28:00	50
4 × 100 metres relay	Top 12 at the 2026 World Athletics Relays + 4 from Top Lists	16	Top 12 at the 2026 World Athletics Relays + 4 from Top Lists	16
4 × 400 metres relay	Top 12 at the 2026 World Athletics Relays + 4 from Top Lists	16	Top 12 at the 2026 World Athletics Relays + 4 from Top Lists	16
4 × 400 metres relay mixed	Top 12 at the 2026 World Athletics Relays + 4 from Top Lists	16	Top 12 at the 2026 World Athletics Relays + 4 from Top Lists	16

=== Wild cards ===
Wild cards will be available to the defending world champions from 2025, winners at the World Athletics Ultimate Championship 2026, winners of the 2026 World Race Walking Tour and World Combined Events Tour, the leading hammer performers on the 2026 Continental Tour, and the winners of the 2027 Wanda Diamond League. If a member federation has four athletes in one event as a result of this criterion, all four will be permitted to compete. Should a member federation have more than one athlete per event qualified via wild card, the member federation will need to select one of those athletes to accept the spot.

== Event schedule ==
On 12 November 2026, World Athletics published the timetable for the championships.

Legend
Key	P	Q	H	½	F
Value	Preliminary round	Qualifiers	Heats	Semifinals	Final

M = morning session, E = evening session

Men
Date	Sep 10		Sep 11			Sep 12		Sep 13	Sep 14	Sep 15	Sep 16	Sep 17	Sep 18		Sep 19		
Event	E		M	E		M	E	E	E	E	E	E	M	E	M	E	
100 m	P	H		½	F												
200 m										H	½	F					
400 m						H			½		F						
800 m									H		½			F			
1500 m				H				½		F							
5000 m											H					F	
10,000 m							F										
Marathon															F		
3000 m steeplechase			H						F								
110 m hurdles														H		½	F
400 m hurdles						H		½		F							
Decathlon			F														
High jump							Q		F								
Pole vault								Q			F						
Long jump									Q	F							
Triple jump	Q						F										
Shot put	Q			F													
Discus throw										Q		F					
Hammer throw											Q			F			
Javelin throw													Q			F	
Half marathon walk			F														
Marathon walk													F				
4 × 100 m relay													H			F	
4 × 400 m relay												H		F			

Women
Date	Sep 10	Sep 11		Sep 12			Sep 13	Sep 14		Sep 15	Sep 16	Sep 17	Sep 18		Sep 19
Event	E	M	E	M	E		E	E		E	E	E	M	E	E
100 m			H		½	F									
200 m										H	½	F			
400 m				H			½			F					
800 m	H				½			F							
1500 m										H		½			F
5000 m	H						F								
10,000 m														F	
Marathon				F											
3000 m steeplechase												H			F
100 m hurdles					H			½	F						
400 m hurdles							H	½			F				
Heptathlon													F		
High jump											Q				F
Pole vault										Q				F	
Long jump				Q			F								
Triple jump										Q		F			
Shot put												Q			F
Discus throw				Q				F							
Hammer throw		Q			F										
Javelin throw			Q				F								
Half marathon walk		F													
Marathon walk													F		
4 × 100 m relay													H		F
4 × 400 m relay												H		F	

Mixed
Date	Sep 10	Sep 11		Sep 12		Sep 13	
Event	E	M	E	M	E	E	
4 × 100 m relay						H	F
4 × 400 m relay	H		F				

== Participating nations ==
- China (TBD) (hosts)

== Media coverage ==
In the United States, television rights to the championships belong to NBC Sports. China plans to rapidly expand its athletics scope in the coming years, with the country set to host the World Indoor Championships in 2025. With this, the hosting rights of the last four World Athletics Championships have been given to the four most powerful economies of the world, namely the US, the European Union, Japan, and now China.

Eurovision Sport and ESPN jointly hold and distribute World Athletics media rights in Europe and Africa. Warner Bros. Discovery has agreed a deal with World Athletics rights-holders Eurovision Sport and ESPN to broadcast the nine-day event on its channels – Eurosport 1, Eurosport 2 and Eurosport App – including its platform discovery+ on a non-exclusive basis in more than 45 countries across Europe (excluding the Nordics region – Denmark, Finland, Norway, Sweden). Streaming is available on discovery+ in Austria, Germany, Italy, the Netherlands, the United Kingdom and Ireland.
