= 2009 World Championships in Athletics – Women's 100 metres hurdles =

The women's 100 metres hurdles at the 2009 World Championships in Athletics was held at the Olympic Stadium 18 and 19 August.

The world leader Lolo Jones had not qualified for the championships, but a number of athletes had also posted fast times and scored major victories in on the World Athletics Tour that season. Among the possible medallists were Americans Damu Cherry, Ginnie Powell. reigning Olympic champion Dawn Harper, and two-time world champion Michelle Perry. Canadians Priscilla Lopes-Schliep and 2003 champion Perdita Felicien were contenders for the title, and the new Oceanian record holder Sally McLellan had shown consistent form. Rounding out the favourites of the field, Jamaican athletes Brigitte Foster-Hylton and Delloreen Ennis-London were seeking to build on past championship successes.

Michelle Perry's chance to gain a third gold ended in the heats, as she was hampered by an injury and finished seventh. Lopes-Schliep registered the fastest time of the first day, with 12.56 seconds. Harper was the fastest in the semi-finals with 12.48 seconds, a new personal best. Compatriot Cherry was the biggest name to be eliminated, unable to beat Irish athlete Derval O'Rourke to the fastest non-qualifying time.

In the final, Harper had a slow start and clipped the second hurdle, effectively ruling her out of the medals. Foster-Hylton, Lopes-Schliep, O'Rourke, McLellan and Ennis-London were all equal at the halfway mark. Foster-Hylton pulled away to take the gold, with Lopes-Schliep holding off Ennis London to win the silver medal. Just behind the medallists were two athletes with unexpected performances: the unfavoured O'Rourke finished fourth with an Irish record while McLellan, one of the pre-race favourites, posted a modest time for fifth place.

Foster-Hylton's gold medal was Jamaica's first in the event on the world stage, and also made her the oldest-ever winner of the sprint hurdles at the World Championships.

== Medalists ==
Gold	Brigitte Foster-Hylton; Jamaica (JAM)
Silver	Priscilla Lopes-Schliep; Canada (CAN)
Bronze	Delloreen Ennis-London; Jamaica (JAM)

== Records ==
World record	Yordanka Donkova (BUL)	12.21	Stara Zagora, Bulgaria	20 August 1988
Championship record	Ginka Zagorcheva (BUL)	12.34	Rome, Italy	4 September 1987
World leading	Lolo Jones (USA)	12.47	Rethymno, Greece	20 July 2009
African record	Glory Alozie (NGR)	12.44	Monaco	8 August 1998
Asian record	Olga Shishigina (KAZ)	12.44	Lucerne, Switzerland	27 June 1995
North American record	Gail Devers (USA)	12.33	Sacramento, United States	23 July 2000
South American record	Maurren Maggi (BRA)	12.71	Manaus, Brazil	19 May 2001
European record	Yordanka Donkova (BUL)	12.21	Stara Zagora, Bulgaria	20 August 1988
Oceanian record	Sally McLellan (AUS)	12.50	Monaco	28 July 2009

== Qualification standards ==
A time	B time
12.96	13.11

== Schedule ==
Date	Time	Round
August 18, 2009	18:10	Heats
August 19, 2009	18:45	Semifinals
August 19, 2009	21:15	Final

== Results ==
=== Heats ===
Qualification: First 4 in each heat (Q) and the next 4 fastest (q) advance to the semifinals.

Rank	Heat	Name	Nationality	Time	Notes
1	4	Priscilla Lopes-Schliep	Canada	12.56	Q
2	5	Brigitte Foster-Hylton	Jamaica	12.67	Q
3	1	Dawn Harper	United States	12.70	Q
4	2	Damu Cherry	United States	12.71	Q
5	1	Delloreen Ennis-London	Jamaica	12.73	Q
6	4	Ginnie Powell	United States	12.77	Q
6	5	Perdita Felicien	Canada	12.77	Q
8	3	Sally McLellan	Australia	12.82	Q
8	5	Anay Tejeda	Cuba	12.82	Q, SB
10	3	Derval O'Rourke	Ireland	12.86	Q, SB
10	5	Sarah Claxton	Great Britain & N.I.	12.86	Q
12	3	Yuliya Kondakova	Russia	12.88	Q, SB
13	2	Lacena Golding-Clarke	Jamaica	12.90	Q
14	4	Nevin Yanıt	Turkey	12.92	Q
15	4	Christina Vukicevic	Norway	12.95	Q
16	1	Olutoyin Augustus	Nigeria	12.99	Q
17	2	Carolin Nytra	Germany	13.03	Q
18	3	Lucie Škrobáková	Czech Republic	13.04	Q
18	4	Eline Berings	Belgium	13.04	q
20	1	Cindy Billaud	France	13.12	Q
21	5	Joanna Kocielnik	Poland	13.16	q, SB
22	2	Irina Lenskiy	Israel	13.18	Q
23	3	Brigitte Merlano	Colombia	13.19	q
23	4	Aleesha Barber	Trinidad and Tobago	13.19	q
25	5	Sandra Gomis	France	13.23	
26	2	Angela Whyte	Canada	13.27	
27	2	Seun Adigun	Nigeria	13.33	
28	4	Lisa Urech	Switzerland	13.36	
29	3	Asuka Terada	Japan	13.41	
29	5	Natalya Ivoninskaya	Kazakhstan	13.41	
31	2	Sonata Tamošaityte	Lithuania	13.44	
32	2	Ekaterina Shtepa	Russia	13.50	
33	1	Tatyana Dektyareva	Russia	13.51	
34	3	Michelle Perry	United States	13.68	
35	1	Andrea Miller	New Zealand	13.83	
36	3	Tamla Pietersen	Zimbabwe	14.50	SB
37	1	Jeimy Bernárdez	Honduras	14.53	
	5	Elisabeth Davin	Belgium	DNF	
	1	Jessica Ennis	Great Britain & N.I.	DNS	
	4	Jessica Ohanaja	Nigeria	DNS	

Key: Q = qualification by place in heat, q = qualification by overall place, SB = Seasonal best

=== Semifinals ===
Qualification: First 2 in each semifinals (Q) and the next 2 fastest (q) advance to the final.

Rank	Heat	Name	Nationality	Time	Notes
1	3	Dawn Harper	United States	12.48	Q, PB
2	2	Brigitte Foster-Hylton	Jamaica	12.54	Q, SB
3	2	Perdita Felicien	Canada	12.58	Q
4	1	Priscilla Lopes-Schliep	Canada	12.60	Q
5	1	Delloreen Ennis-London	Jamaica	12.64	Q
6	3	Sally McLellan	Australia	12.66	Q
7	1	Ginnie Powell	United States	12.73	q
7	3	Derval O'Rourke	Ireland	12.73	q, SB
9	2	Damu Cherry	United States	12.76	
9	3	Lacena Golding-Clarke	Jamaica	12.76	
11	2	Anay Tejeda	Cuba	12.82	SB
12	1	Lucie Škrobáková	Czech Republic	12.92	
13	3	Carolin Nytra	Germany	12.94	
14	3	Eline Berings	Belgium	12.94	NR
15	1	Nevin Yanıt	Turkey	12.99	
16	1	Yuliya Kondakova	Russia	13.00	
16	2	Christina Vukicevic	Norway	13.00	
18	1	Aleesha Barber	Trinidad and Tobago	13.06	SB
19	2	Olutoyin Augustus	Nigeria	13.11	
20	1	Cindy Billaud	France	13.20	
21	3	Joanna Kocielnik	Poland	13.21	
22	3	Sarah Claxton	Great Britain & N.I.	13.21	
23	2	Brigitte Merlano	Colombia	13.23	
24	2	Irina Lenskiy	Israel	13.29	

Key: NR = National record, PB = Personal best, Q = qualification by place in heat, q = qualification by overall place, SB = Seasonal best

=== Final ===
Rank	Name	Nationality	Time	Notes
1st place, gold medalist(s)	Brigitte Foster-Hylton	Jamaica	12.51	SB
2nd place, silver medalist(s)	Priscilla Lopes-Schliep	Canada	12.54	
3rd place, bronze medalist(s)	Delloreen Ennis-London	Jamaica	12.55	SB
4	Derval O'Rourke	Ireland	12.67	NR
5	Sally McLellan	Australia	12.70	
6	Ginnie Powell	United States	12.78	
7	Dawn Harper	United States	12.81	
8	Perdita Felicien	Canada	15.53	

Key: NR = National record, SB = Seasonal best
