= Athletics at the 2010 Commonwealth Games – Women's 100 metres hurdles =

Women's 100 metres hurdles at the Commonwealth Games

The Women's 100 metres hurdles at the 2010 Commonwealth Games as part of the athletics programme was held at the Jawaharlal Nehru Stadium on Sunday 10 October and Monday 11 October 2010.

== Records ==
World Record	12.21	Yordanka Donkova	BUL	Stara Zagora, Bulgaria	20 August 1988
Games Record	12.65	Brigitte Foster-Hylton	JAM	Melbourne, Australia	23 March 2006

== Round 1 ==
First 3 in each heat (Q) and 2 best performers (q) advance to the Final.

Wind Readings

Heat 1: +1.1 m/s, Heat 2: +0.9 m/s

=== Heat 1 ===
Rank	Lane	Name	Reaction Time	Result	Notes
1	4	Sally Pearson (AUS)	0.161	13.02	Q
2	7	Andrea Bliss (JAM)	0.174	13.34	Q
3	2	Andrea Miller (NZL)	0.200	13.35	Q, SB
4	5	Seun Adigun (NGR)	0.169	13.57	q
5	6	Dimitra Arachoviti (CYP)	0.201	13.82	q
6	8	Anchu Mm (IND)	0.193	14.30	
7	3	Sumita Rani (BAN)	0.192	14.35	

=== Heat 2 ===
Rank	Lane	Name	Reaction Time	Result	Notes
1	5	Angela Whyte (CAN)	0.189	13.09	Q
2	7	Aleesha Barber (TRI)	0.196	13.35	Q
3	3	Gayathri Govindaraj (IND)	0.187	13.83	Q
4	9	Kylie Robilliard (GUE)	0.170	13.94	SB
5	8	Telma Cossa (MOZ)	0.221	14.48	
6	8	Anuradha Biswal (IND)	0.220	14.96	
	2	Louise Hazel (ENG)			DNS
	4	Carole Kaboud Mebam (CMR)			DNS

== Final ==
Wind: +0.9 m/s

Rank	Lane	Name	Reaction Time	Result	Notes
1st place, gold medalist(s)	7	Sally Pearson (AUS)	0.153	12.67	
2nd place, silver medalist(s)	4	Angela Whyte (CAN)	0.140	12.98	SB
3rd place, bronze medalist(s)	8	Andrea Miller (NZL)	0.204	13.25	SB
4	6	Andrea Bliss (JAM)	0.149	13.28	
5	5	Aleesha Barber (TRI)	0.177	13.28	
6	3	Seun Adigun (NGR)	0.161	13.66	
7	9	Gayathri Govindaraj (IND)	0.198	13.95	
–	2	Dimitra Arachoviti (CYP)			DSQ
