= Athletics at the 2015 Pan American Games – Women's 100 metres hurdles =

Women's 100 metres hurdles at the 2015 Pan American Games
- Venue: CIBC Pan Am and Parapan Am Athletics Stadium
- Dates: July 21
- Competitors: 17 from 11 nations
- Winning time: 12.52

Medalists
Gold medal	Queen Harrison	United States
Silver medal	Tenaya Jones	United States
Bronze medal	Nikkita Holder	Canada

The women's 100 metres hurdles sprint competition of the athletics events at the 2015 Pan American Games took place on July 21 at the CIBC Pan Am and Parapan Am Athletics Stadium in Toronto, Canada. The defending Pan American Games champion is Yvette Lewis of the United States.

== Records ==
Prior to this competition, the existing world and Pan American Games records were as follows:

World record	Yordanka Donkova (BUL)	12.21	Stara Zagora, Bulgaria	August 20, 1988
Pan American Games record	Perdita Felicien (CAN); Delloreen Ennis-London (JAM)	12.65	Rio de Janeiro, Brazil	July 25, 2007

== Qualification ==
Each National Olympic Committee (NOC) was able to enter up to two entrants providing they had met the minimum standard (13.77) in the qualifying period (January 1, 2014 to June 28, 2015).

== Schedule ==
Date	Time	Round
July 21, 2015	18:15	Semifinals
July 21, 2015	20:50	Final

== Results ==
All times shown are in seconds.

KEY:	q	Fastest non-qualifiers	Q	Qualified	NR	National record	PB	Personal best	SB	Seasonal best	DQ	Disqualified

=== Semifinals ===
Rank	Heat	Name	Nationality	Time	Wind	Notes
1	2	Queen Harrison	United States	12.72	+2.3	Q
2	1	Tenaya Jones	United States	12.81	+2.6	Q
3	1	Kimberly Laing	Jamaica	12.86	+2.6	Q
4	1	Yvette Lewis	Panama	12.92	+2.6	Q
5	2	Nikkita Holder	Canada	12.96	+2.3	Q
6	1	Phylicia George	Canada	13.00	+2.6	q
7	1	Brigitte Merlano	Colombia	13.01	+2.6	q
8	1	Adelly Santos	Brazil	13.08	+2.6	
9	1	Akela Jones	Barbados	13.10	+2.6	
10	2	Kierre Beckles	Barbados	13.14	+2.3	Q
11	2	LaVonne Idlette	Dominican Republic	13.14	+2.3	
12	1	Adanaca Brown	Bahamas	13.18	+2.6	
13	2	Devynne Charlton	Bahamas	13.22	+2.3	
14	2	Fabiana Moraes	Brazil	13.28	+2.3	
15	2	Genesis Romero	Venezuela	13.37	+2.3	
16	2	Belkis Milanes	Cuba	13.45	+2.3	
	2	Monique Morgan	Jamaica	DNS		

=== Final ===
Wind: +1.4

Rank	Lane	Name	Nationality	Time	Notes
1st place, gold medalist(s)	4	Queen Harrison	United States	12.52	PR
2nd place, silver medalist(s)	3	Tenaya Jones	United States	12.84	
3rd place, bronze medalist(s)	6	Nikkita Holder	Canada	12.85	SB
4	5	Kimberly Laing	Jamaica	12.95	
5	2	Phylicia George	Canada	13.00	
6	1	Brigitte Merlano	Colombia	13.24	
7	7	Kierre Beckles	Barbados	13.24	
8	8	Yvette Lewis	Panama	13.29	
