= Jamaica at the 2009 World Championships in Athletics =

- WA code: JAM
- National federation: Jamaica Amateur Athletic Association
- Website: www.jaaaltd.com

in Berlin
- Competitors: 46
- Medals: Gold 7 Silver 4 Bronze 2 Total 13

World Championships in Athletics appearances
- 1983; 1987; 1991; 1993; 1995; 1997; 1999; 2001; 2003; 2005; 2007; 2009; 2011; 2013; 2015; 2017; 2019; 2022; 2023; 2025

Jamaica competed at the 2009 World Championships in Athletics from 15–23 August. A team of 46 athletes was announced in preparation for the competition. Selected athletes achieved one of the competition's qualifying standards. The squad had a number of medal hopes for the sprinting events, including Usain Bolt, Asafa Powell, and Michael Frater in the men's and Veronica Campbell-Brown, Kerron Stewart, and Shelly-Ann Fraser in the women's. Olympic gold medallist Melaine Walker competed in the 400 metres hurdles and 2007 World Championship silver medallists Maurice Smith, Shericka Williams, and Novlene Williams-Mills also feature.

The Jamaican team suffered a number of setbacks before the event: five of the selected athletes (Yohan Blake, Allodin Fothergill, Lansford Spence, Marvin Anderson and Sheri-Ann Brooks) tested positive for the stimulant methylxanthine, although it is unclear whether they will be banned from competition. In a separate incident, the Jamaica Amateur Athletic Association threatened the five athletes in Stephen Francis' Maximising Velocity Power Track Club with deselection after they failed to attend a mandatory training camp in Berlin. The athletes (Asafa Powell, Shelly-Ann Fraser, Melaine Walker, Brigitte Foster-Hylton and Shericka Williams) were eventually cleared for competition following the personal intervention of IAAF president Lamine Diack.

== Team selection ==
Track and road events

Event	Athletes	
Event	Men	Women
100 metres	Usain Bolt; Michael Frater; Steve Mullings; Asafa Powell	Aleen Bailey; Shelly-Ann Fraser; Kerron Stewart; Veronica Campbell-Brown
200 metres	Usain Bolt; Leford Green; Steve Mullings	Veronica Campbell-Brown; Simone Facey; Anniesha McLaughlin
400 metres	Ricardo Chambers; Allodin Fothergill; Lansford Spence	Novlene Williams-Mills; Shericka Williams; Christine Day
800 metres		Kenia Sinclair
100 metres hurdles	—	Delloreen Ennis-London; Brigitte Foster-Hylton; Lacena Golding-Clarke
110 metres hurdles	Richard Phillips; Dwight Thomas; Maurice Wignall	—
400 metres hurdles	Isa Phillips; Danny McFarlane; Josef Robertson	Melaine Walker; Kaliese Spencer; Nickiesha Wilson
4×100 metres relay	Usain Bolt; Michael Frater; Steve Mullings; Asafa Powell; Dwight Thomas	Aleen Bailey; Shelly-Ann Fraser; Kerron Stewart; Veronica Campbell-Brown; Simone Facey; Anniesha McLaughlin
4×400 metres relay	Ricardo Chambers; Allodin Fothergill; Lansford Spence; Dane Hyatt; Jermaine Gonzales	Novlene Williams-Mills; Shericka Williams; Christine Day; Rosemarie Whyte; Shereefa Lloyd; Bobby-Gaye Wilkins

Field and combined events

Event	Athletes	
Event	Men	Women
Long jump	Alain Bailey; Nicholas Gordon	Jovanee Jarrett
Triple jump	Julian Reid	Trecia Smith; Kimberly Williams
Shot put	Dorian Scott	
Decathlon	Maurice Smith	—

- Also, the Jamaica Amateur Athletic Association selected three reserve athletes: Markino Buckley (400 m hurdles), Vonette Dixon (100 m hurdles), and Ramone McKenzie (200 m).
