= Athletics at the 2014 Commonwealth Games – Women's 100 metres hurdles =

Women's 100 metres hurdles at the Commonwealth Games

The Women's 100 metres hurdles at the 2014 Commonwealth Games, as part of the athletics programme, took place at Hampden Park on 31 July and 1 August 2014. Sally Pearson of Australia won the gold medal.

== Records ==
World Record	12.21	Yordanka Donkova	BGR	Stara Zagora, Bulgaria	20 August 1988
Games Record	12.65	Brigitte Foster-Hylton	JAM	Melbourne, Australia	23 March 2006

== Heats ==
=== Heat 1 ===
Rank	Lane	Name	Reaction Time	Result	Notes
1	2	Tiffany Porter (ENG)	0.166	12.84	Q
2	7	Danielle Williams (JAM)	0.151	13.15	Q
3	3	Kierre Beckles (BAR)	0.173	13.32	q
4	8	Michelle Jenneke (AUS)	0.171	13.33	q
5	4	Ugonna Ndu (NGR)	0.167	13.35	
6	6	Demeteria Edgecomb (BAH)	0.153	14.04	
7	5	Raja Nursheena Raja Azhar (MAS)	0.176	14.30	

=== Heat 2 ===
Rank	Lane	Name	Reaction Time	Result	Notes
1	7	Sally Pearson (AUS)	0.127	12.69	Q
2	8	Josanne Lucas (TRI)	0.181	13.38	Q
3	5	Serita Solomon (ENG)	0.162	13.38	
4	2	Indira Spence (JAM)	0.206	13.44	
5	6	Phylicia George (CAN)	0.164	13.66	
6	3	Krystal Bodie (BAH)	0.169	13.71	
7	4	Silvia Panguana (MOZ)	0.185	14.98	

=== Heat 3 ===
Rank	Lane	Name	Reaction Time	Result	Notes
1	4	Angela Whyte (CAN)	0.163	13.33	Q
2	7	Shannon McCann (AUS)	0.144	13.34	Q
3	6	Nichole Denby (NGR)	0.161	13.54	
4	5	Monique Morgan (JAM)	0.159	13.61	
5	3	Deborah John (TRI)	0.158	13.63	
6	2	Kylie Robilliard (GUE)	0.165	14.20	

== Final ==
Rank	Lanes	Athlete	Nation	Time	Notes
1st place, gold medalist(s)	4	Sally Pearson	AUS	12.67	
2nd place, silver medalist(s)	6	Tiffany Porter	ENG	12.80	
3rd place, bronze medalist(s)	3	Angela Whyte	CAN	13.02	
4	5	Danielle Williams	JAM	13.06	
5	1	Michelle Jenneke	AUS	13.36	
6	2	Kierre Beckles	BAR	13.38	
7	8	Josanne Lucas	TTO	13.41	
8	7	Shannon McCann	AUS	13.60	
				Wind: -0.1 m/s	
