= Athletics at the 2006 Commonwealth Games – Women's 100 metres hurdles =

Women's 100 metres hurdles at the Commonwealth Games

The women's 100 metres hurdles event at the 2006 Commonwealth Games was held on March 23–24.

== Medalists ==
Gold	Silver	Bronze
Brigitte Foster-Hylton; Jamaica	Angela Whyte; Canada	Delloreen Ennis-London; Jamaica

== Results ==
=== Heats ===
Qualification: First 3 of each heat (Q) and the next 2 fastest (q) qualified for the final.

Wind:
Heat 1: +1.0 m/s, Heat 2: +0.9 m/s

Rank	Heat	Name	Nationality	Time	Notes
1	1	Brigitte Foster-Hylton	Jamaica	12.65	Q, GR
2	1	Angela Whyte	Canada	12.80	Q, SB
3	2	Delloreen Ennis-London	Jamaica	12.89	Q
4	2	Lacena Golding-Clarke	Jamaica	12.90	Q
5	1	Sally McLellan	Australia	13.02	Q
6	1	Evmorfia Baourda	Cyprus	13.35	q, PB
6	2	Fiona Cullen	Australia	13.35	Q
8	2	Julie Pratt	England	13.49	q
9	1	Moh Siew Wei	Malaysia	13.62	
10	2	Joy Dihiga	Nigeria	13.79	
11	2	Carole Kaboud Mebam	Cameroon	13.82	

=== Final ===
Wind: –0.3 m/s

Rank	Lane	Name	Nationality	Time	Notes
1st place, gold medalist(s)	5	Brigitte Foster-Hylton	Jamaica	12.76	
2nd place, silver medalist(s)	3	Angela Whyte	Canada	12.94	
3rd place, bronze medalist(s)	6	Delloreen Ennis-London	Jamaica	13.00	
4	4	Lacena Golding-Clarke	Jamaica	13.01	
5	1	Fiona Cullen	Australia	13.31	
6	2	Julie Pratt	England	13.48	
7	8	Evmorfia Baourda	Cyprus	13.64	
	7	Sally McLellan	Australia	DQ	
