= 2005 World Championships in Athletics – Women's 100 metres hurdles =

The 100 metres hurdles at the 2005 World Championships in Athletics was held at the Helsinki Olympic Stadium on August 9, 10 and 11.

The top four runners in each of the initial 5 heats automatically qualified for the semifinals. The next four fastest runners from across the heats also qualified. There were three semifinal heats, and only the top two from each heat plus the next two fastest runners advanced to the final.

== Summary ==
Olympic champion Joanna Hayes was out the fastest, gaining about a foot over the first barrier. That advantage didn't last long as there were six women dead even over the second. By the third hurdle Michelle Perry had emerged with a fractional lead. By the fourth, Delloreen Ennis-London began to separate by inches from the wall as Mariya Koroteyeva and Kirsten Bolm began to lose ground. Ennis-London was much faster to the sixth hurdle, capturing a slight lead. Running virtually stride for stride, immediately to Ennis-London's left, Hayes also pulled even with Perry, with Brigitte Foster-Hylton just inches behind the three. But Ennis-London lost her quick snap over the hurdles, instead gliding, relinquishing her hold on the lead while Hayes again was matching Perry stride for stride until Hayes hooked the ninth hurdle. She lost her balance between hurdles so much she never jumped the tenth hurdle, instead carrying it some seven metres down the track before pushing it away and striding over the finish line in last. With her last challenger suddenly out of the race, Perry ran in to the finish with a 1-metre lead over Ennis-London, who was less than a half metre ahead of her teammate Foster-Hylton across the line for silver.

== Medalists ==
Gold	Michelle Perry; United States (USA)
Silver	Delloreen Ennis-London; Jamaica (JAM)
Bronze	Brigitte Foster-Hylton; Jamaica (JAM)

== Results ==
All times shown are in seconds.
Q denotes qualification by place.
q denotes qualification by time.
DNS denotes did not start.
DNF denotes did not finish.
AR denotes area record
NR denotes national record.
PB denotes personal best.
SB denotes season's best.

=== Round 1 ===
August 9

==== Heat 1 ====
1. Michelle Perry, United States 12.64s Q
2. Vonette Dixon, Jamaica 12.95s Q
3. Jenny Kallur, Sweden 12.96s Q
4. Reïna-Flor Okori, France 13.14s Q
5. Maíla Machado, Brazil 13.21s
6. Hanna Korell, Finland 13.39s
- Fatmata Fofanah, Guinea DNS

==== Heat 2 ====
1. Delloreen Ennis-London, Jamaica 12.65s Q
2. Glory Alozie, Spain 12.71s Q
3. Mariya Koroteyeva, Russia 12.73s Q
4. Ginnie Powell, United States 12.91s Q
5. Sarah Claxton, United Kingdom 13.17s
6. Flora Redoumi, Greece 13.65s
7. Jeimy Bernardez, Honduras 14.78s
8. Barbara Rustignoli, San Marino 15.51s

==== Heat 3 ====
1. Perdita Felicien, Canada 12.77s Q
2. Nadine Faustin-Parker, Haiti 12.85s Q
3. Aurelia Trywianska, Poland 12.86s Q
4. Susanna Kallur, Sweden 12.87s Q
5. Adrianna Lamalle, France 12.93s q
6. (Republic of Ireland) Derval O'Rourke, Ireland 13.00s q (SB)
7. Trecia Roberts, Thailand 13.93s (SB)

==== Heat 4 ====
1. Brigitte Foster-Hylton, Jamaica 12.64s Q
2. Kirsten Bolm, Germany 12.68s Q
3. Irina Shevchenko, Russia 12.76s Q (SB)
4. Priscilla Lopes, Canada 12.85s Q
5. Anay Tejeda, Cuba 12.96s q
6. (Republic of the Congo) Solène Eboulabeka, The Congo 14.66s
- Lucie Martincová, Czech Republic DNS

==== Heat 5 ====
1. Joanna Hayes, United States 12.79s Q
2. Linda Ferga-Khodadin, France 12.85s Q
3. Olena Krasovska, Ukraine 12.86s Q
4. Angela Whyte, Canada 12.88s Q
5. Feng Yun, China 12.99s q
6. Celine Laporte, Seychelles 14.00s
- Natalya Rusakova, Russia DNF

=== Semifinals ===
August 10

==== Semifinal 1 ====
1. Delloreen Ennis-London, Jamaica 12.79s Q
2. Mariya Koroteyeva, Russia 12.80s Q
3. Jenny Kallur, Sweden 12.85s q (PB)
4. Perdita Felicien, Canada 12.94s
5. Anay Tejeda, Cuba 12.95s
6. Ginnie Powell, United States 13.02s
7. Yun Feng, China 13.15s
- Linda Ferga-Khodadin, France DNF

==== Semifinal 2 ====
1. Brigitte Foster-Hylton, Jamaica 12.65s Q
2. Joanna Hayes, United States 12.76s Q
3. Irina Shevchenko, Russia 12.76s q (SB)
4. Olena Krasovska, Ukraine 12.85s
5. Priscilla Lopes, Canada 12.91s
6. Reïna-Flor Okori, France 12.99s
7. (Republic of Ireland) Derval O'Rourke, Ireland 13.23s
8. Nadine Faustin-Parker, Haiti 13.27s

==== Semifinal 3 ====
1. Michelle Perry, United States 12.86s Q
2. Kirsten Bolm, Germany 12.95s Q
3. Susanna Kallur, Sweden 13.05s
4. Glory Alozie, Spain 13.05s
5. Vonette Dixon, Jamaica 13.08s
6. Aurelia Trywianska, Poland 13.11s
7. Angela Whyte, Canada 13.52s
8. Adrianna Lamalle, France 13.60s

=== Final ===
August 11

1. Michelle Perry, United States 12.66s
2. Delloreen Ennis-London, Jamaica 12.76s
3. Brigitte Foster-Hylton, Jamaica 12.76s
4. Kirsten Bolm, Germany 12.82s
5. Mariya Koroteyeva, Russia 12.93s
6. Jenny Kallur, Sweden 12.95s
7. Irina Shevchenko, Russia 12.97s
- Joanna Hayes, United States DNF

Olympic champion and favorite Joanna Hayes stumbled in the hurdles.
