= Yenima Arencibia =

Cuban sprint hurdler

Personal information
- Full name: Yenima Arencibia Barrizonte
- Nationality: Cuba
- Born: 25 December 1984 (age 41) San Luis, Pinar del Río, Cuba
- Height: 1.67 m (5 ft 5 1/2 in)
- Weight: 55 kg (121 lb)

Sport
- Sport: Athletics
- Event: 100 metres hurdles
Medal record
Women's athletics
Representing Cuba
CAC Championships
Silver medal – second place	2008 Cali	100 m hurdles
- Updated on 25 June 2013

Yenima Arencibia Barrisontes (or Yenima Arencibia Barrizonte; born 25 December 1984) is a Cuban sprint hurdler.

== Career ==
Arencibia represented Cuba at the 2008 Summer Olympics in Beijing, where she competed for the women's 100 m hurdles, along with her teammate Anay Tejeda. She won a silver medal at the 2008 Central American and Caribbean Championships in Cali, Colombia, with her personal best time of 12.95 seconds. She is also the aunt of decathlete Yordanis García, a two-time Olympian and Pan American Games medalist.

At the 2008 Summer Olympics, Arencibia ran in the third heat against seven other athletes, including Australia's Sally Pearson, who later won a silver medal in the final. She finished the heat in sixth place by six tenths of a second (0.60) behind Pearson, outside her personal best of 13.43 seconds. Arencibia, however, failed to advance into the semi-finals, as she placed thirty-second overall, and ranked below two mandatory slots for the next round.

== Personal bests ==
Outdoor

Event	Points	Venue	Date
100 metres	11.80	Alcalá de Henares, Spain	7 July 2007
100 metres hurdles	12.95	Cali, Colombia	5 July 2008

Indoor

Event	Points	Venue	Date
60 metres hurdles	8.09	Valencia, Spain	10 February 2007
60 metres hurdles	8.09	Chemnitz, Germany	23 February 2007

- All information taken from IAAF profile.

== Achievements ==
Year	Competition	Venue	Position	Event	Notes
Representing Cuba
2005	ALBA Games	Havana, Cuba	1st	100 m hurdles	13.29 s (wind: -1.1 m/s)
2005	Central American and Caribbean Championships	Nassau, Bahamas	4th (h)	100 m hurdles	13.60 s (wind: +1.7 m/s)
2005	Central American and Caribbean Championships	Nassau, Bahamas	3rd	4 × 100 m relay	45.07 s
2006	NACAC Under-23 Championships	Santo Domingo, Dominican Republic	4th	100 m hurdles	13.35 s (wind: +0.4 m/s)
2006	Central American and Caribbean Games	Cartagena, Colombia	10th (h)	100 m hurdles	14.25 s w (wind: +2.1 m/s)
2006	Central American and Caribbean Games	Cartagena, Colombia	3rd	4 × 400 m relay	3:36.34 min
2007	Pan American Games	Rio de Janeiro, Brazil	9th (h)	100 m hurdles	13.32 s (wind: +0.6 m/s)
2007	Pan American Games	Rio de Janeiro, Brazil	2nd (h)	4 × 100 m relay	43.46 s
2007	Universiade	Bangkok, Thailand	8th	100 m hurdles	13.33 s (wind: -0.3 m/s)
2008	Central American and Caribbean Championships	Cali, Colombia	2nd	100 m hurdles	12.95 s A (wind: +1.4 m/s)
2008	Olympic Games	Beijing, China	32nd (h)	100 m hurdles	13.43 s (wind: -0.1 m/s)
2009	ALBA Games	Havana, Cuba	2nd	100 m hurdles	13.10 s w (wind: +3.3 m/s)
2009	Central American and Caribbean Championships	Havana, Cuba	5th	100 m hurdles	13.23 s (wind: +1.0 m/s)
2011	ALBA Games	Barquisimeto, Venezuela	1st	100 m hurdles	13.36 s (wind: +0.8 m/s)
2011	ALBA Games	Barquisimeto, Venezuela	1st	4 × 100 m relay	45.33 s
2011	Pan American Games	Guadalajara, Mexico	6th	100 m hurdles	13.22 s (wind: +0.2 m/s)
