= Athletics at the 2002 Commonwealth Games – Women's 100 metres hurdles =

Women's 100 metres hurdles at the Commonwealth Games

The women's 100 metres hurdles event at the 2002 Commonwealth Games was held on 29–31 July.

== Medalists ==
| Gold | Silver | Bronze |
|---|---|---|
| Lacena Golding-Clarke; Jamaica | Vonette Dixon; Jamaica | Angela Atede; Nigeria |

== Results ==
=== Heats ===
Qualification: First 3 of each heat (Q) and the next 2 fastest (q) qualified for the final.

Wind:
Heat 1: +0.9 m/s, Heat 2: +0.8 m/s

| Rank | Heat | Name | Nationality | Time | Notes |
|---|---|---|---|---|---|
| 1 | 1 | Lacena Golding-Clarke | Jamaica | 12.74 | Q, PB |
| 2 | 1 | Vonette Dixon | Jamaica | 12.83 | Q, PB |
| 3 | 2 | Diane Allahgreen | England | 12.92 | Q, PB |
| 4 | 2 | Brigitte Foster | Jamaica | 12.98 | Q |
| 5 | 2 | Angela Atede | Nigeria | 13.01 | Q, SB |
| 6 | 1 | Angela Whyte | Canada | 13.03 | Q, PB |
| 7 | 1 | Julie Pratt | England | 13.08 | q, PB |
| 8 | 2 | Jacquie Munro | Australia | 13.22 | q |
| 9 | 1 | Melanie Wilkins | England | 13.29 | |
| 9 | 2 | Sriyani Kulawansa | Sri Lanka | 13.29 | |
| 11 | 1 | Fiona Cullen | Australia | 13.45 | |
| 12 | 2 | Rachel King | Wales | 13.58 | |
| 13 | 2 | Tamsin Stephens | Northern Ireland | 13.59 | |
| 14 | 1 | Christy Akinremi | Nigeria | 13.73 | |
| | 2 | Shabana Khattak | Pakistan | DNF | |
| | 1 | Carole Kaboud Mebam | Cameroon | DNS | |
| | 1 | Olutoyin Augustus | Nigeria | DNS | |

=== Final ===
Wind: +0.6 m/s

| Rank | Name | Nationality | Time | Notes |
|---|---|---|---|---|
| 1st place, gold medalist(s) | Lacena Golding-Clarke | Jamaica | 12.77 | |
| 2nd place, silver medalist(s) | Vonette Dixon | Jamaica | 12.83 | PB |
| 3rd place, bronze medalist(s) | Angela Atede | Nigeria | 12.98 | SB |
| 4 | Diane Allahgreen | England | 13.01 | |
| 5 | Angela Whyte | Canada | 13.17 | |
| 6 | Julie Pratt | England | 13.26 | |
| 7 | Jacquie Munro | Australia | 13.31 | |
| | Brigitte Foster | Jamaica | DNS | |
