= Athletics at the 2008 Summer Olympics – Women's 100 metres hurdles =

Women's 100 metres hurdles at the Games of the XXIX Olympiad
- Venue: Beijing National Stadium
- Dates: 17 August 2008 (heats); 18 August 2008 (semi-finals); 19 August 2008 (final)
- Competitors: 40 from 31 nations
- Winning time: 12.54 s

Medalists
1st place, gold medalist(s)		Dawn Harper	United States
2nd place, silver medalist(s)		Sally McLellan	Australia
3rd place, bronze medalist(s)		Priscilla Lopes-Schliep	Canada

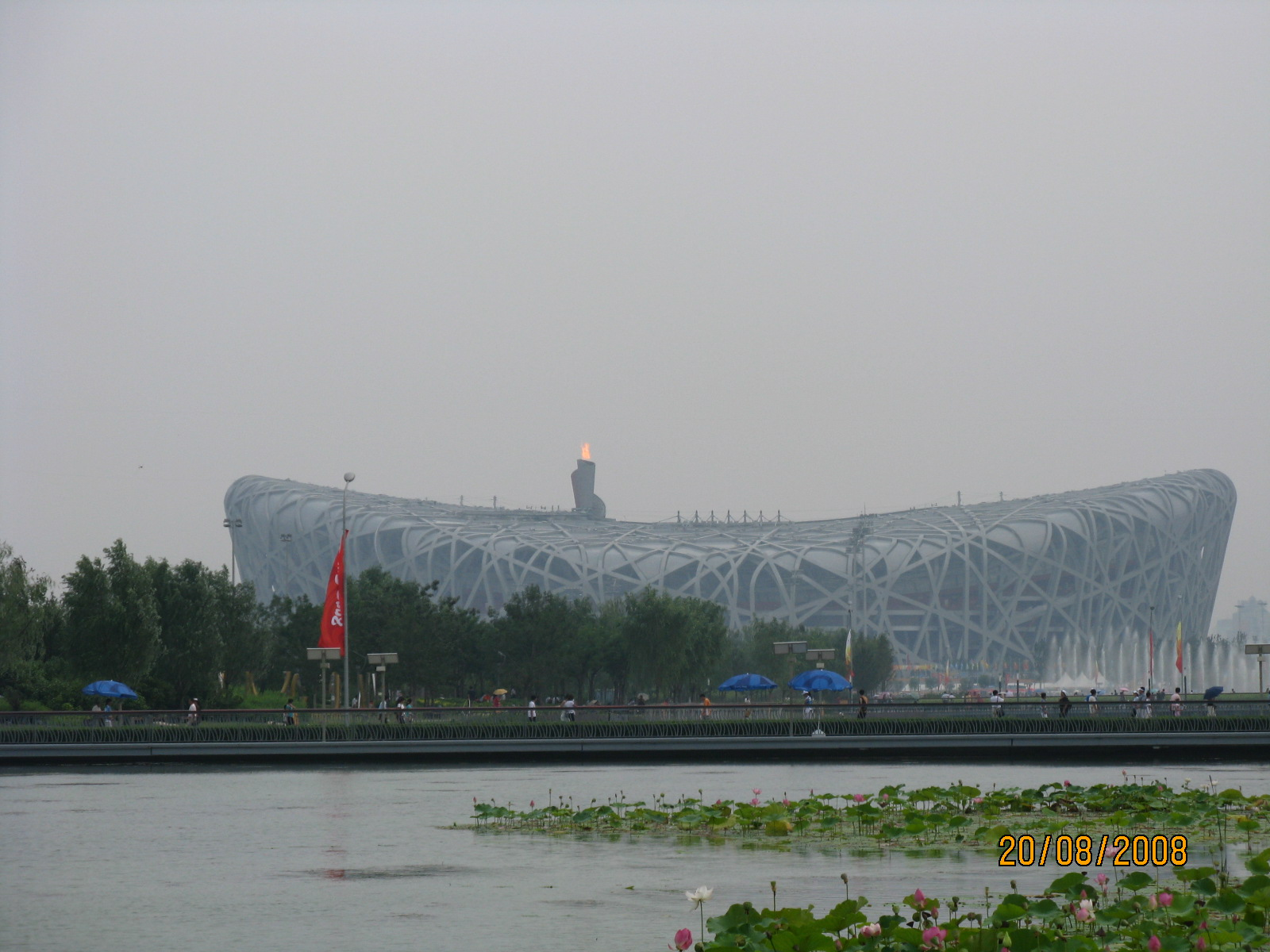
2008 Beijing Summer Olympics

The women's 100 metres hurdles at the 2008 Summer Olympics took place on 17–19 August at the Beijing National Stadium.

The qualifying standards were 12.96 s (A standard) and 13.11 s (B standard).

Coming into the Olympics, Lolo Jones had the fastest time of the year, 12.45 in the semi-finals of the U.S. Olympic Trials. Jones had also won those trials convincingly in a wind aided 12.29 (coming within .08 of the 20-year-old world record).

The first round was distinguished by five runners finishing within .03 of each other. In the semi-final, Jones separated from the field by .19, setting a wind legal personal best 12.43 and a new fastest time of the year.

In the final, Sally McLellan was out fast, clearly the first over the first hurdle. By the fourth hurdle she had almost a full stride lead over the wall of competitors across the track behind her, with Jones starting to gain a slight advantage. But McLellan couldn't hold the lead. Over the next two hurdles, Jones stormed by, with the rest of the field gaining on McLellan. Dawn Harper was starting to separate ahead of the wall. Jones continued to pull away to a full stride on Harper as McLellan fell back to run even with the wall. At the ninth hurdle, Jones didn't get her lead leg high enough to clear the barrier. Her foot hit the slat square on. She rode the hurdle to the ground, landing awkwardly and losing her forward momentum. She had to jump long strides just to clear the final hurdle but was losing ground on every step. Harper took the hurdles cleanly and held her edge to cross the line for gold. Behind her, McLellan, Priscilla Lopes-Schliep, Damu Cherry, Delloreen Ennis-London and Brigitte Foster-Hylton (the wall) hit the line together. .02 separated second through sixth with McLellan getting the photo finish nod over Lopes-Schliep for the medals. Four years later Harper and McLellan (under her married name of Pearson) would also get gold and silver, but in the opposite order.

== Records ==
Prior to this competition, the existing world record, Olympic record, and world leading time were as follows:

World record	Yordanka Donkova (BUL)	12.21 s	Stara Zagora, Bulgaria	20 August 1988
Olympic record	Joanna Hayes (USA)	12.37 s	Athens, Greece	24 August 2004
World Leading	Lolo Jones (USA)	12.45 s	Eugene, Oregon, United States	6 July 2008

No new world or Olympic records were set for this event.

== Results ==
=== Round 1 ===
Qualifying rule: first two of each heat (Q) plus the six fastest times (q) qualified.

Rank	Heat	Athlete	Nation	Time	Notes
1	1	Josephine Onyia	Spain	~~12.68~~	DSQ
2	1	Susanna Kallur	Sweden	12.68	Q
3	2	Vonette Dixon	Jamaica	12.69	Q, SB
3	5	Brigitte Foster-Hylton	Jamaica	12.69	Q
5	4	LoLo Jones	United States	12.71	Q
6	5	Dawn Harper	United States	12.73	Q
7	2	Priscilla Lopes-Schliep	Canada	12.75	Q
8	3	Delloreen Ennis-London	Jamaica	12.82	Q
9	3	Sally McLellan	Australia	12.83	Q
10	4	Anay Tejeda	Cuba	12.84	Q
11	2	Damu Cherry	United States	12.91	q
12	1	Nevin Yanit	Turkey	12.94	q
13	2	Carolin Nytra	Germany	12.95	q
14	3	Sarah Claxton	Great Britain	12.97	q
15	4	Reïna-Flor Okori	France	12.98	q
15	1	Aurelia Trywiańska-Kollasch	Poland	12.98	q
17	5	Anastassiya Pilipenko	Kazakhstan	12.99	
18	5	Aleesha Barber	Trinidad and Tobago	13.01	NR
19	4	Christina Vukicevic	Norway	13.05	PB
20	4	Tatyana Dektyareva	Russia	13.05	
21	5	Yevgeniya Snihur	Ukraine	13.06	
22	3	Yuliya Kondakova	Russia	13.07	
23	3	Angela Whyte	Canada	13.11	
24	1	Micol Cattaneo	Italy	13.13	
25	2	Aleksandra Antonova	Russia	13.18	
25	1	Lucie Škrobáková	Czech Republic	13.18	
27	4	Natalya Ivoninskaya	Kazakhstan	13.20	
28	2	Derval O'Rourke	Ireland	13.22	
29	5	Nadine Faustin-Parker	Haiti	13.25	
30	4	Toyin Augustus	Nigeria	13.34	
31	1	Katsiaryna Paplauskaya	Belarus	13.39	
32	3	Yenima Arencibia	Cuba	13.43	
33	2	Maíla Machado	Brazil	13.45	
34	5	Dedeh Erawati	Indonesia	13.49	NR
35	3	Flóra Redoúmi	Greece	13.56	
36	3	Edit Vári	Hungary	13.59	
37	1	Miriam Bobková	Slovakia	13.65	
38	2	Fadwa Al Bouza	Syria	14.24	SB
39	4	Jeimy Bernardez	Honduras	14.29	
	5	Fatmata Fofanah	Guinea	DNF	

=== Semifinals ===
Qualification: First 4 in each heat and the next fastest advance to the Final.

Rank	Heat	Athlete	Nation	Reaction	Time	Notes
1	1	LoLo Jones	United States	0.172	12.43	Q, PB
2	2	Damu Cherry	United States	0.189	12.62	Q
3	2	Dawn Harper	United States	0.191	12.66	Q
4	1	Delloreen Ennis-London	Jamaica	0.145	12.67	Q
5	1	Priscilla Lopes-Schliep	Canada	0.159	12.68	Q
6	1	Sally McLellan	Australia	0.140	12.70	Q
7	2	Brigitte Foster-Hylton	Jamaica	0.162	12.76	Q
8	2	Sarah Claxton	Great Britain	0.145	12.84	Q
9	2	Vonette Dixon	Jamaica	0.237	12.86	
9	1	Josephine Onyia	Spain	0.203	~~12.86~~	DSQ
11	1	Aurelia Trywiańska-Kollasch	Poland	0.118	12.96	
12	1	Carolin Nytra	Germany	0.144	12.99	
13	2	Reïna-Flor Okori	France	0.153	13.05	
14	1	Nevin Yanit	Turkey	0.201	13.28	
	2	Susanna Kallur	Sweden	0.198	DNF	
	2	Anay Tejeda	Cuba	0.156	DNF	

=== Final ===
Position	Lane	Athlete	Nation	Reaction	Time	Notes
1st place, gold medalist(s)	6	Dawn Harper	United States	0.193	12.54	PB
2nd place, silver medalist(s)	3	Sally McLellan	Australia	0.138	12.64	
3rd place, bronze medalist(s)	8	Priscilla Lopes-Schliep	Canada	0.174	12.64	
4	7	Damu Cherry	United States	0.239	12.65	
5	5	Delloreen Ennis-London	Jamaica	0.151	12.65	
6	9	Brigitte Foster-Hylton	Jamaica	0.167	12.66	
7	4	LoLo Jones	United States	0.185	12.72	
8	2	Sarah Claxton	Great Britain	0.163	12.94	

WR world record | AR area record | CR championship record | GR games record | NR national record | OR Olympic record | PB personal best | SB season best | WL world leading (in a given season)
