= Athletics at the 2011 Pan American Games – Women's 100 metres hurdles =

Women's 100 metres hurdles at the 2011 Pan American Games
- Venue: Telmex Athletics Stadium
- Dates: October 25–26
- Competitors: 14 from 11 nations

Medalists
Gold medal	Yvette Lewis	United States
Silver medal	Angela Whyte	Canada
Bronze medal	Lina Flórez	Colombia

The women's 100 metres hurdles sprint competition of the athletics events at the 2011 Pan American Games took place between the 25 and 26 of October at the Telmex Athletics Stadium. The defending Pan American Games champion was Delloreen Ennis-London of Jamaica.

== Records ==
Prior to this competition, the existing world and Pan American Games records were as follows:

World record	Yordanka Donkova (BUL)	12.21	Stara Zagora, Bulgaria	August 20, 1988
Pan American Games record	Delloreen Ennis-London (JAM)	12.65	Rio de Janeiro, Brazil	July 25, 2007

== Qualification ==
Each National Olympic Committee (NOC) was able to enter one athlete regardless if they had met the qualification standard. To enter two entrants both athletes had to have met the minimum standard (14.00) in the qualifying period (January 1, 2010 to September 14, 2011).

== Schedule ==
Date	Time	Round
October 25, 2011	15:50	Semifinals
October 26, 2011	17:20	Final

== Results ==
All times shown are in seconds.

KEY:	q	Fastest non-qualifiers	Q	Qualified	NR	National record	PB	Personal best	SB	Seasonal best	DQ	Disqualified

=== Semifinals ===
Held on October 25. The first three in each heat and the next two fastest advanced to the finals.

Wind:
Heat 1: -0.4, Heat 2: +0.4

Rank	Heat	Name	Nationality	Time	Notes
1	2	Yvette Lewis	United States	12.88	Q
2	2	Yenima Arencibia	Cuba	13.13	Q
3	1	Brigitte Merlano	Colombia	13.18	Q
4	1	Angela Whyte	Canada	13.18	Q
5	2	Lina Flórez	Colombia	13.26	Q
6	1	Christie Gordon	Canada	13.36	Q
7	1	Maíla Machado	Brazil	13.36	q
8	2	LaVonne Idlette	Dominican Republic	13.40	q
9	1	Belkis Milanes	Cuba	13.56	
10	1	Gabriela Santos	Mexico	13.85	
11	2	Jeimmy Bernardez	Honduras	13.92	
12	2	Petra Mcdonald	Bahamas	14.09	
13	1	Daniela Castillo	Ecuador	14.37	
14	2	Giuliana Franciosi	Peru	14.67	

=== Final ===
Held on October 26.

Wind: +0.2

Rank	Name	Nationality	Time	Notes
1st place, gold medalist(s)	Yvette Lewis	United States	12.81	
2nd place, silver medalist(s)	Angela Whyte	Canada	13.09	
3rd place, bronze medalist(s)	Lina Flórez	Colombia	13.09	
4	Brigitte Merlano	Colombia	13.10	
5	Maíla Machado	Brazil	13.14	SB
6	Yenima Arencibia	Cuba	13.22	
7	Christie Gordon	Canada	13.48	
8	LaVonne Idlette	Dominican Republic	13.62	
