= Brigitte Merlano =

Colombian hurdler (born 1982)

Personal information
- Full name: Brigitte María Merlano Pájaro
- Born: April 29, 1982 (age 44) Barranquilla, Atlántico, Colombia
- Height: 1.72 m (5 ft 8 in)
- Weight: 60 kg (132 lb)

Sport
- Country: Colombia
- Sport: Athletics
- Event: Hurdling
- Updated on 2 January 2015

Brigitte María Merlano Pájaro (born 29 April 1982 in Barranquilla) is a Colombian hurdler. Her first name is also spelled Briggite or Brigith. At the 2012 Summer Olympics, she competed in the Women's 100 metres hurdles.

== Personal bests ==
- 100 m: 12.12 (wind: -0.1 m/s) – (Puerto Rico) Caguas, 15 March 2012
- 200 m: 24.08 (wind: -2.5 m/s) – (Puerto Rico) Ponce, 12 Apr 2008
- 100 m hurdles: 12.89 (wind: +0.9 m/s) – (Puerto Rico) Mayagüez, 17 July 2011

== Competition record ==
Year	Competition	Venue	Position	Event	Notes
Representing Colombia
2001	South American Junior Championships	Santa Fe, Argentina	4th	100 m hurdles	14.87
2001	Pan American Junior Championships	Santa Fe, Argentina	2nd	100 m hurdles	14.65
2003	South American Championships	Barquisimeto, Venezuela	6th	100 m hurdles	14.38
2004	South American U23 Championships	Barquisimeto, Venezuela	1st	100 m hurdles	13.57 (-0.9 m/s)
2004	Ibero-American Championships	Huelva, Spain	4th	100 m hurdles	13.77
2005	South American Championships	Cali, Colombia	3rd	100 m hurdles	13.68
2005	Bolivarian Games	Armenia, Colombia	1st	100 m hurdles	13:68 (-1.2 m/s)
2006	Ibero-American Championships	Ponce, Puerto Rico	4th	100 m hurdles	13.52
2006	Central American and Caribbean Games	Cartagena, Colombia	7th	100 m hurdles	13.86
2006	South American Championships	Tunja, Colombia	4th	100 m hurdles	14.10
2007	South American Championships	São Paulo, Brazil	5th	200 m	24.44 (-0.1 m/s)
2007	South American Championships	São Paulo, Brazil	1st	100 m hurdles	13.27
2007	South American Championships	São Paulo, Brazil	2nd	4 × 100 m relay	44.68
2007	Pan American Games	Rio de Janeiro, Brazil	11th (h)	100 m hurdles	13.35
2007	Pan American Games	Rio de Janeiro, Brazil	8th (h)	4 × 100 m relay	44.53
2008	Ibero-American Championships	Iquique, Chile	2nd	100 m hurdles	13.60
2008	Central American and Caribbean Championships	Cali, Colombia	5th	100 m hurdles	13.22
2009	South American Championships	Lima, Peru	1st	100 m hurdles	13.22
2009	Central American and Caribbean Championships	Havana, Cuba	4th	100 m hurdles	13.21
2009	World Championships	Berlin, Germany	23rd (sf)	100 m hurdles	13.23
2009	Bolivarian Games	Sucre, Bolivia	1st	100 m hurdles	13.35 (-0.1 m/s)
2009	Bolivarian Games	Sucre, Bolivia	1st	4 × 100 m relay	43.96
2010	Ibero-American Championships	San Fernando, Spain	2nd	100 m hurdles	13.10
2010	Central American and Caribbean Games	Mayagüez, Puerto Rico	4th	100 m hurdles	13.21
2011	South American Championships	Buenos Aires, Argentina	1st	100 m hurdles	13.07
2011	Central American and Caribbean Championships	Mayagüez, Puerto Rico	2nd	100 m hurdles	12.89
2011	World Championships	Daegu, South Korea	21st (sf)	100 m hurdles	13.21
2011	Pan American Games	Guadalajara, Mexico	4th	100 m hurdles	13.10
2012	Olympic Games	London, United Kingdom	24th (h)	100 m hurdles	13.21
2013	South American Championships	Cartagena, Colombia	2nd	100 m hurdles	13.20
2013	World Championships	Moscow, Russia	22nd (sf)	100 m hurdles	13.22
2013	Bolivarian Games	Trujillo, Peru	3rd	100 m hurdles	13.60 (+0.1 m/s)
2014	South American Games	Santiago, Chile	3rd	100 m hurdles	13.30
2014	Ibero-American Championships	São Paulo, Brazil	4th	100 m hurdles	13.22
2014	Pan American Sports Festival	Mexico City, Mexico	5th	100m hurdles	13.29 A (+0.9 m/s)
2014	Central American and Caribbean Games	Xalapa, Mexico	2nd	100m hurdles	13.19 A (-0.8 m/s)
2015	South American Championships	Lima, Peru	2nd	100 m hurdles	13.43
2015	Pan American Games	Toronto, Canada	6th	100 m hurdles	13.24
2016	Ibero-American Championships	Rio de Janeiro, Brazil	3rd	100 m hurdles	13.06
2016	Olympic Games	Rio de Janeiro, Brazil	30th (h)	100 m hurdles	13.09
2018	South American Games	Cochabamba, Bolivia	5th	100 m hurdles	13.57
2018	Central American and Caribbean Games	Barranquilla, Colombia	5th	100 m hurdles	13.24
