= LaVonne Idlette =

Dominican Republic hurdler

Personal information
- Born: 31 October 1985 (age 40) Miami, United States

Sport
- Sport: Track and field
- Event: 100 metres hurdles

LaVonne Idlette (born October 31, 1985, in Miami, United States) is an American hurdler competing internationally for the Dominican Republic. At the 2012 Summer Olympics, she competed in the Women's 100 metres hurdles.

Her personal bests are 12.77 seconds in the 100 metres hurdles (+1.8 m/s, Montverde 2013) and 8.16 seconds in the 60 metres hurdles (Sopot 2014). Both are current Dominican Republic records.

Idlette appeared on The Amazing Race 32 with Kellie Wells and placed tenth and being the second team eliminated.

Since 2023, Lavonne Idette has served as a Global Partner of the ACE Global Leaders of Excellence Network.

== Competition record ==
Year	Competition	Venue	Position	Event	Notes
Representing Dominican Republic
2009	Central American and Caribbean Championships	Havana, Cuba	6th	100 m hurdles	13.50
2010	Central American and Caribbean Games	Mayagüez, Puerto Rico	7th	100 m hurdles	13.83
2011	Central American and Caribbean Championships	Mayagüez, Puerto Rico	8th (h)	100 m hurdles	13.92
2011	World Championships	Daegu, South Korea	28th (h)	100 m hurdles	13.39
2011	Pan American Games	Guadalajara, Mexico	8th	100 m hurdles	13.62
2012	Ibero-American Championships	Barquisimeto, Venezuela	3rd	100 m hurdles	13.24
2012	Olympic Games	London, United Kingdom	35th (h)	100 m hurdles	13.60
2013	Central American and Caribbean Championships	Morelia, Mexico	3rd	100 m hurdles	13.41
2013	World Championships	Moscow, Russia	11th (sf)	100 m hurdles	12.91
2014	World Indoor Championships	Sopot, Poland	21st (h)	60 m hurdles	8.16
2014	Ibero-American Championships	São Paulo, Brazil	1st	100 m hurdles	12.99
2014	Ibero-American Championships	São Paulo, Brazil	2nd	4 × 100 m relay	46.58
2015	Pan American Games	Toronto, Canada	11th (h)	100 m hurdles	13.14 (w)
2015	NACAC Championships	San José, Costa Rica	5th	100 m hurdles	13.01 (w)
2015	World Championships	Beijing, China	33rd (h)	100 m hurdles	13.70
