= Andrea Bliss =

Jamaican athlete (born 1980)

Personal information
- Full name: Andrea Antoinette Bliss
- Born: 5 October 1980 (age 45) Kingston, Jamaica
- Height: 1.73 m (5 ft 8 in)
- Weight: 62 kg (137 lb)

Sport
- Country: Jamaica
- Sport: Athletics
- Event: Hurdling
- Updated on 26 January 2015

Andrea Bliss (born 5 October 1980) is a Jamaican athlete who specialises in the 100 metres hurdles. She represented her country at the 2013 World Championships reaching the semifinals. In addition, she finished fourth at the 2010 Commonwealth Games.

== Personal bests ==
She has personal bests of 12.82 seconds in the 100 metres hurdles (Kingston 2013) and 8.08 seconds in the 60 metres hurdles (Düsseldorf 2006).

Event	Result	Venue	Date
Outdoor
200 m	26.04 s (wind: +0.8 m/s)	Kingston, Jamaica	17 Mar 2012
400 m	55.45 s	Kingston, Jamaica	15 Apr 2000
100 m hurdles	12.82 s (wind: +0.7 m/s)	Kingston, Jamaica	23 Jun 2013
Indoor
60 m	7.69 s	Saskatoon, Canada	4 Feb 2011
200 m	25.06 s	Gainesville, United States	2 Mar 2006
400 m	54.92 s	University Park, United States	27 Jan 2001
60 m hurdles	8.08 s	Düsseldorf, Germany	17 Feb 2006

== Competition record ==
Year	Competition	Venue	Position	Event	Notes
Representing Jamaica
1996	CARIFTA Games (U17)	Kingston, Jamaica	4th	400 m	57.09
1996	CARIFTA Games (U17)	Kingston, Jamaica	1st	300 m H	43.6
1996	CARIFTA Games (U17)	Kingston, Jamaica	4th	Long jump	5.30 m
1996	Central American and Caribbean Junior Championships (U17)	San Salvador, El Salvador	2nd	300 m H	43.28
1996	Central American and Caribbean Junior Championships (U17)	San Salvador, El Salvador	1st	4x400 m	3:45.51
1996	Central American and Caribbean Junior Championships (U17)	San Salvador, El Salvador	1st	Long jump	5.49 m
1998	CARIFTA Games (U20)	Port of Spain, Trinidad and Tobago	2nd	400 m H	59.90
1999	CARIFTA Games (U20)	Fort-de-France, Martinique	4th	100 m H	13.94 (w)
1999	CARIFTA Games (U20)	Fort-de-France, Martinique	4th	400 m H	59.74
1999	Pan American Junior Championships	Tampa, United States	3rd	400 m H	57.94
2005	Central American and Caribbean Championships	Nassau, Bahamas	2nd	100 m H	12.86
2006	Central American and Caribbean Games	Cartagena, Colombia	4th	100 m H	13.42
2010	Central American and Caribbean Games	Mayagüez, Puerto Rico	3rd	100 m H	13.20
2010	Central American and Caribbean Games	Mayagüez, Puerto Rico	2nd	4x100 m	44.27
2010	Commonwealth Games	Delhi, India	4th	100 m H	13.28
2010	Commonwealth Games	Delhi, India	–	4x100 m	DQ
2011	Central American and Caribbean Championships	Mayagüez, Puerto Rico	7th	100 m H	13.50
2013	World Championships	Moscow, Russia	13th (sf)	100 m H	12.92
2014	Pan American Sports Festival	Mexico City, Mexico	3rd	100m hurdles	13.18 A (wind: +0.9 m/s)
