= Rosina Hodde =

Dutch hurdler (born 1983)

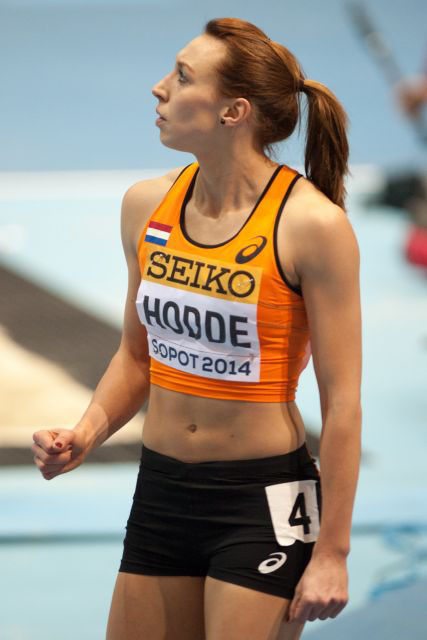
- Rosina Hodde in 2014

Personal information
- Born: 10 February 1983 (age 43) Dordrecht, Netherlands

Sport
- Country: Netherlands
- Sport: Track and field
- Event: Hurdles

Rosina Hodde (Dutch: [roːˈsinaː ˈɦɔdə]; born 10 February 1983) is a Dutch hurdler. She competed in the 60 metres event at the 2014 IAAF World Indoor Championships.
