= Angela Whyte =

Canadian hurdler (born 1980)

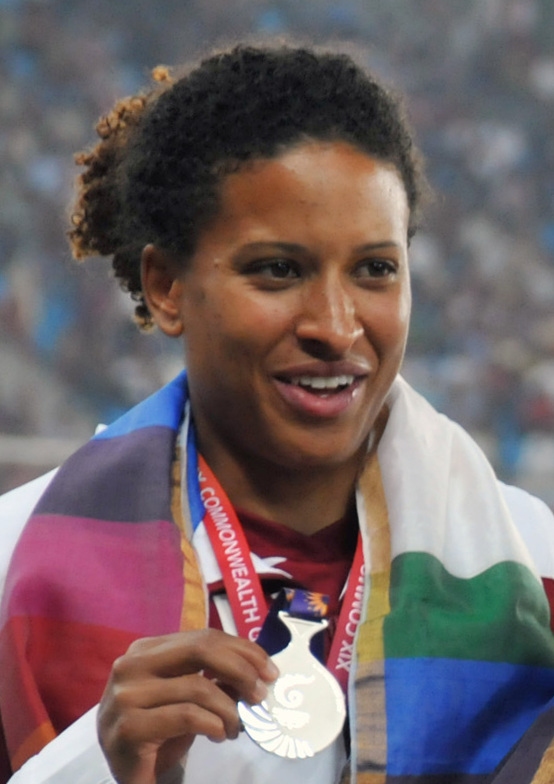

Personal information
- Born: 22 May 1980 (age 46) Edmonton, Alberta, Canada

Sport
- Sport: 100 m hurdles

Achievements and titles
- Personal bests: 55 meters: 7.01, 2001 60 meters: 7.36 Pullman, 2008; 100 meters: 11.57 Northridge, 2003; 200 meters: 23.74 Northridge, 2003; 55m hurdles: 7.48 Kearns, 2003; 60m hurdles: 7.92 Moscow, 2008; 100m hurdles: 12.64 Carson, 2007; 100m hurdles: 12.52w (+3.1) Edmonton, 2013; 400m hurdles: 58.74 London, 2001 long jump: 6.23 m Azusa, 2014 heptathlon: 6080 Moscow, 2007
Medal record
Representing Canada
Commonwealth Games
Silver medal – second place	2006 Melbourne	100m hurdles
Silver medal – second place	2010 Delhi	100m hurdles
Bronze medal – third place	2014 Glasgow	100m hurdles
Pan American Games
Silver medal – second place	2011 Guadalajara	100m hurdles
Bronze medal – third place	2007 Rio de Janeiro	100m hurdles

Angela Whyte (born 22 May 1980) is a Canadian hurdler in track and field athletic competition. She is a three-time Olympian (2004, 2008, and 2016) in the 100m hurdles at the Summer Olympics. She has won multiple medals at both the Pan American Games and the Commonwealth Games in the 100 metres hurdles. She was a four-time All-American and a five-time Big West Conference champion in two years of competition at the University of Idaho and holds school records in the sprints, hurdles, jumps, multi-events and relays at both Idaho and the University of New Mexico. She also holds two Big West records in the 100m hurdles. She is currently an assistant track and field coach at Washington State University.

== Personal life ==
Whyte was born in Edmonton, Alberta.

== College career ==
Whyte attended the University of New Mexico and competed on the track and field team in 1999 and 2000. She set individual school records in the 55m hurdles (8.15), 60 meters (7.59), 60m hurdles (8.49) and 100m hurdles (13.41 – converted from 13.37 for altitude) in her time at UNM. Her records in the 55m hurdles and 100m hurdles still stand at New Mexico. She also ran the second leg of New Mexico's school record 4 × 100 m relay that posted a time of 45.26. She was also a Mountain West Conference All-MWC honoree in the 100m hurdles and 4 × 100 m relay in 2000.

Whyte transferred to the University of Idaho after the 2000 season and attended Idaho from 2001 to 2003. She led the Vandal women's track and field team to the 2001 Big West Conference title in women's track and field. At the 2001 Big West Championships, she scored 35.5 points and won titles in the 100m hurdles, long jump and 4 × 100 m relay to lead Idaho's women to the Big West team title. She was honored for her efforts as the Big West Women's Athlete of the Year. Whyte qualified for the 2001 NCAA Indoor Track & Field Championships in the 60m hurdles, but false-started in the qualifying heats. She earned All-America honors at the 2001 NCAA Outdoor Track & Field Championships with a third-place finish in the 100m hurdles (12.82). She helped Idaho finish 16th in the NCAA team standings at that meet, which ranks as the highest all-time NCAA team finish for Idaho women's track and field.

After redshirting the 2002 season, Whyte returned in 2003 and led Idaho to its second Big West Conference track and field title. At the 2003 Big West Conference Track & Field Championships, Whyte won individual titles in the 100m, 200m and 100m hurdles, and ran on Idaho's first-place 4 × 100 m and 4 × 400 m relays. Whyte was honored as the Big West Conference Women's Track Athlete of the Year after her performance. She earned her second-career All-America honor during the 2003 indoor season when she finished eighth in the 60m hurdles (8.18) at the NCAA Indoor Track & Field Championships. Whyte earned two All-America certificates at the 2003 NCAA Outdoor Track & Field Championships with a third-place finish in the heptathlon (5,745) and a seventh-place finish in the 100m hurdles (13.07). She helped Idaho finish 20th as a team at the meet. Whyte also broke the Big West Conference all-time record (13.06) and the Big West Championship Meet record (13.11) in the 100m hurdles in 2003

Whyte graduated from the University of Idaho in 2003 with a degree in Crime and Justice Studies. When she finished her career, she held 10 individual Idaho school records and was a member of three more relay school records. All 10 of her individual records and two of the relay records still stand. Despite only competing at Idaho for two seasons, Whyte remains the program's all-time leading scorer with 81.5 points at outdoor championship meets. She was inducted into the Vandal Athletics Hall of Fame in 2010.

== Professional career ==
Whyte finished sixth at the 2004 Olympic Games in the 100m hurdles (12.81). At the 2008 Olympic Games, she finished 23rd overall after finishing fifth in heat three (13.11). She represented Canada at every IAAF World Championships in Athletics meet from 2001 to 2009. She, along with fellow Canadian Perdita Felicien, was one of just two women to qualify for every World Championship competition in the 100m hurdles during that span. Her best finish came in 2007 (Osaka, Japan) when she was a finalist and finished eighth (12.66). She was also a World Championships semifinalist in the 100m hurdles in 2003 (12.89) and 2005 (13.52).

Whyte claimed silver in the 100m hurdles (12.94) at the 2006 Commonwealth Games and again took second at the 2010 Commonwealth Games with a time of 12.98. She represented Canada at the 2007 Pan American Games, where she took bronze with a time of 12.72. She claimed silver at the 2011 Pan American Games with a time of 13.09.

She won the 2001 Canadian national title in the 100m hurdles with a time of 13.10, held at Edmonton, Alberta. She won her second Canadian title in the event in 2013 with a time of 12.90 at Moncton, New Brunswick. Whyte was the Canadian national runner-up in 2003 (12.97), 2004 (12.85), 2006 (12.69), 2007 (12.55w) and 2008 (12.96). She finished third at the Canadian Championships in 2005 (13.13), 2009 (13.05), 2010 (13.00) and fourth in 2011 (12.99) and 2012 (12.90). She also was the national runner-up in the 200m in 2006 (23.82). While competing, Whyte has also served as a volunteer assistant coach for University of Idaho Track & Field since 2005.

In July 2016 she was officially named to Canada's Olympic team.

== Achievements ==
Year	Competition	Venue	Position	Event	Notes
Representing Canada
1999	Pan American Junior Championships	Tampa, United States	5th	100 m hurdles	14.05
2000	NACAC U25 Championships	Monterrey, Mexico	3rd	100 m hurdles	14.14 (-1.8 m/s)
2001	Jeux de la Francophonie	Ottawa, Canada	4th	100 m hurdles	13.09
2001	World Championships	Edmonton, Canada	27th (h)	100 m hurdles	13.38
2002	Commonwealth Games	Manchester, United Kingdom	5th	100 m hurdles	13.17
2003	World Championships	Paris, France	12th (sf)	100 m hurdles	12.89
2003	Pan American Games	Santo Domingo, Dominican Republic	5th	100 m hurdles	12.94
2004	World Indoor Championships	Budapest, Hungary	21st (h)	60 m hurdles	8.17
2004	Olympic Games	Athens, Greece	6th	100 m hurdles	12.81
2005	World Championships	Helsinki, Finland	22nd (sf)	100 m hurdles	13.52
2006	Commonwealth Games	Melbourne, Australia	2nd	100 m hurdles	12.94
2007	Pan American Games	Rio de Janeiro, Brazil	3rd	100 m hurdles	12.72
2007	World Championships	Osaka, Japan	8th	100 m hurdles	12.66
2008	World Indoor Championships	Valencia, Spain	23rd (h)	60 m hurdles	8.16
2008	Olympic Games	Beijing, China	23rd (h)	100 m hurdles	13.11
2009	World Championships	Berlin, Germany	26th (h)	100 m hurdles	13.27
2010	Commonwealth Games	Delhi, India	2nd	100 m hurdles	12.98
2011	Pan American Games	Guadalajara, Mexico	2nd	100 m hurdles	13.09
2013	World Championships	Moscow, Russia	6th	100 m hurdles	12.78
2014	Commonwealth Games	Glasgow, United Kingdom	3rd	100 m hurdles	13.02
2016	World Indoor Championships	Portland, United States	5th	60 m hurdles	7.99
2016	Olympic Games	Rio de Janeiro, Brazil	30th (h)	100 m hurdles	13.09
2017	World Championships	London, United Kingdom	30th (h)	100 m hurdles	13.23
2018	World Indoor Championships	Birmingham, United Kingdom	25th (h)	60 m hurdles	8.21
2018	Commonwealth Games	Gold Coast, Australia	5th	Heptathlon	5898
