= 2014 IAAF World Indoor Championships – Women's 60 metres hurdles =

The women's 60 metres hurdles at the 2014 IAAF World Indoor Championships took place on 7–8 March 2014.

== Medalists ==
Gold	Silver	Bronze
Nia Ali; United States	Sally Pearson; Australia	Tiffany Porter; Great Britain

== Records ==
Standing records prior to the 2014 IAAF World Indoor Championships
World record	Susanna Kallur (SWE)	7.68	Karlsruhe, Germany	10 February 2008
Championship record	Lolo Jones (USA)	7.72	Doha, Qatar	13 March 2010
World Leading	Sally Pearson (AUS)	7.79	Berlin, Germany	26 February 2012
African record	Glory Alozie (NGR)	7.82	Madrid, Spain	16 February 1999
Asian record	Olga Shishigina (KAZ)	7.82	Liévin, France	21 February 1999
European record	Susanna Kallur (SWE)	7.68	Karlsruhe, Germany	10 February 2008
North and Central American and Caribbean record	Lolo Jones (USA)	7.72	Doha, Qatar	13 March 2010
Oceanian Record	Sally Pearson (AUS)	7.73	Istanbul, Turkey	10 March 2012
South American record	Yvette Lewis (PAN)	7.99	Berlin, Germany	1 March 2014
Records broken during the 2014 IAAF World Indoor Championships
South American record	Yvette Lewis (PAN)	7.91	Sopot, Poland	7 March 2014

== Qualification standards ==
Indoor	Outdoor
8.16	12.90 (100 mH)

== Schedule ==
Date	Time	Round
7 March 2014	18:05	Heats
8 March 2014	18:10	Semifinals
8 March 2014	20:45	Final

== Results ==
=== Heats ===
Qualification: First 3 in each heat (Q) and the next 4 fastest (q) qualified for the semifinal.

Rank	Heat	Name	Nationality	Time	Notes
1	1	Sally Pearson	Australia	7.79	Q, SB
2	2	Nia Ali	United States	7.87	Q
2	3	Cindy Billaud	France	7.87	Q, PB
4	2	Yvette Lewis	Panama	7.91	Q, AR
5	1	Eline Berings	Belgium	7.95	Q, SB
5	4	Tiffany Porter	Great Britain	7.95	Q
7	2	Marzia Caravelli	Italy	7.97	Q, PB
8	4	Nadine Hildebrand	Germany	7.98	Q
9	3	Janay DeLoach Soukup	United States	8.01	Q
10	1	Cindy Roleder	Germany	8.03	Q
11	3	Yuliya Kondakova	Russia	8.04	Q, SB
12	3	Sara Aerts	Belgium	8.05	q, SB
13	1	Rosina Hodde	Netherlands	8.07	q, PB
14	4	Marina Tomić	Slovenia	8.07	Q
15	1	Monique Morgan	Jamaica	8.10	q, PB
15	3	Andrea Ivančević	Croatia	8.10	q, NR
17	3	Matilda Bogdanoff	Finland	8.12	PB
18	2	Indira Spence	Jamaica	8.14	
19	2	Gnima Faye	Senegal	8.15	NR
19	2	Hanna Platitsyna	Ukraine	8.15	PB
21	3	LaVonne Idlette	Dominican Republic	8.16	NR
21	4	Giulia Pennella	Italy	8.16	
23	4	Urszula Bhebhe	Poland	8.17	PB
24	2	Yekaterina Galitskaya	Russia	8.20	
25	1	Nooralotta Neziri	Finland	8.21	
26	4	Beate Schrott	Austria	8.24	
27	1	Anastassiya Pilipenko	Kazakhstan	8.27	
28	4	Natalya Ivoninskaya	Kazakhstan	8.44	
29	3	Sharon Kwarula	Papua New Guinea	8.71	
	4	Eva Vital	Portugal	DNS	

=== Semifinals ===
Qualification: First 4 in each heat (Q) qualified for the final.

Rank	Heat	Name	Nationality	Time	Notes
1	1	Sally Pearson	Australia	7.81	Q
2	2	Nia Ali	United States	7.88	Q
3	2	Cindy Billaud	France	7.89	Q
4	1	Janay DeLoach Soukup	United States	7.93	Q
4	1	Tiffany Porter	Great Britain	7.93	Q
6	1	Cindy Roleder	Germany	7.96	Q
6	2	Nadine Hildebrand	Germany	7.96	Q
8	1	Marzia Caravelli	Italy	7.97	PB
9	1	Yvette Lewis	Panama	8.00	
10	2	Yuliya Kondakova	Russia	8.03	Q, SB
11	2	Marina Tomić	Slovenia	8.05	PB
12	2	Eline Berings	Belgium	8.07	
13	1	Andrea Ivančević	Croatia	8.09	NR
14	1	Sara Aerts	Belgium	8.10	
15	2	Rosina Hodde	Netherlands	8.14	
16	2	Monique Morgan	Jamaica	8.19	

=== Final ===
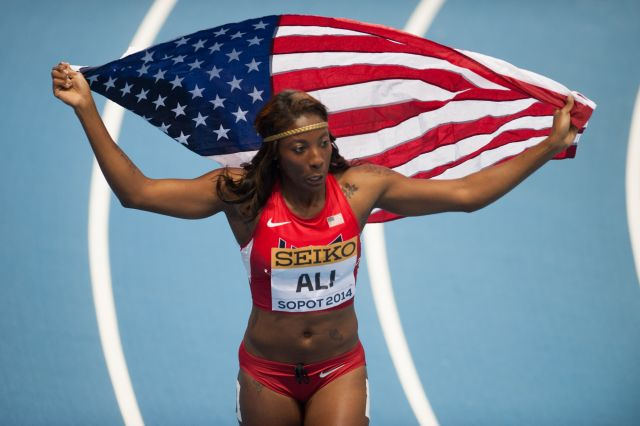
Nia Ali after winning the event

Rank	Lanes	Name	Nationality	Time	Notes
1st place, gold medalist(s)	3	Nia Ali	United States	7.80	=PB
2nd place, silver medalist(s)	4	Sally Pearson	Australia	7.85	
3rd place, bronze medalist(s)	7	Tiffany Porter	Great Britain	7.86	SB
4	5	Cindy Billaud	France	7.89	
5	6	Janay DeLoach Soukup	United States	7.90	
6	1	Cindy Roleder	Germany	8.01	
7	8	Nadine Hildebrand	Germany	8.02	
8	2	Yuliya Kondakova	Russia	8.08	
