= Jill Dopf Viles =

American writer (1974–2025)

- Born: Jill E. Dopf; November 10, 1974; Des Moines, Iowa
- Died: June 12, 2025 (aged 50); Iowa
- Education: University of Iowa
- Occupation: Writer, lay scientist
- Spouse: Jeremy Viles (m. 2005–2025)
- Children: 1
- Writing career
- Years active: 1996–2025
- Subject: Muscular dystrophy
- Website: diyscientist.blog

Jill Dopf Viles was an American writer and medical researcher recognized for her self-diagnosis of Emery-Dreifuss muscular dystrophy. She also conducted scientific research on the disease and was instrumental in diagnosing the disease in Canadian Olympic athlete Priscilla Lopes-Schliep.

== Early life and education ==
Jill Viles was born in Des Moines, Iowa, in 1974, the eldest of five children. Viles' mother was a stay-at-home parent, while her father worked as an Assistant United States Attorney. Viles exhibited typical developmental milestones until the age of 4, when she began frequently tripping and falling, describing the sensation as "witches' fingers" pulling on her legs.

Her parents took her to the Mayo Clinic, where Viles was diagnosed with a mild form of muscular dystrophy, a group of genetic diseases characterized by progressive weakness and degeneration of muscle fibers. Other members of the family also exhibited elevated creatine kinase levels, an enzyme that leaks out of damaged muscles, but only Jill experienced such difficulty with walking.

Despite the diagnosis, Viles described her childhood as fun and playful.

By the age of 12, with the onset of puberty, Viles encountered further physical limitations, finding herself unable to ride a bike and noticing a significant thinning of her arms and legs.

After graduating from Roosevelt High School in Des Moines, she attended Iowa State University where she majored in genetics.

== Muscular dystrophy research ==
While studying genetics at Iowa State University, Viles dedicated her free time to reading literature on muscular dystrophy. In addition to personal research, Viles secured an internship at the Human Gene Therapy Research Institute, affiliated with Iowa Methodist Medical Center. It was here that Viles supplemented her understanding of molecular biology.

=== Emery-Dreifuss muscular dystrophy ===
Following her sophomore year, Viles had an internship at the Whitney Research Laboratory in St. Augustine, Florida. While perusing a neurology textbook, she stumbled upon an article detailing Emery-Dreifuss muscular dystrophy. Struck by the resemblance of the symptoms and physical features described to those of her father, she realized the condition's association with cardiac issues—a health concern her father had been battling with. Viles took this information to the Iowa Heart Center, where cardiologists implanted a pacemaker in her father to mitigate potential cardiac complications.

==== Further investigation ====
Following unsuccessful attempts to engage neurologists in Iowa, Viles reached out to a research laboratory in Italy that was studying four families affected by Emery-Dreifuss muscular dystrophy. Impressed by her letter, the laboratory requested a blood sample from Viles for gene sequencing.

Four years later, in 1999, Viles received an email from the Italian laboratory confirming that her family, along with the four other families under study, had a mutation in the LMNA gene, specifically known as the lamin gene. The lamin gene is responsible for making nuclear lamina, and influences how genes in the nucleus regulate growth and development, specifically fat and muscle production. Viles in particular had a point mutation within the lamin gene, where a cytosine nucleotide was replaced with a guanine nucleotide. This specific mutation led to the difficulties in developing muscle and fat, especially in periods of rapid growth such as puberty. These results were confirmation that Viles and her family had Emery-Dreifuss muscular dystrophy.

== Partial lipodystrophy ==
After news of her self-diagnosis spread, Viles was offered a summer internship at Johns Hopkins University at the age of 25. It was here that she read of another rare genetic disease, partial lipodystrophy. Partial lipodystrophy is a rare condition characterized by an abnormal distribution of fatty tissue.

Upon comparing pictures of partial lipodystrophy patients, Viles speculated that she might be affected by both partial lipodystrophy and Emery-Dreifuss muscular dystrophy. She attended a medical conference at Hopkins where she showed photos to doctors and informed them of her belief that she had not one, but two, rare genetic mutations. However, instead of support, she encountered skepticism from some medical professionals, who dismissed her concerns as manifestations of "intern syndrome." Viles continued her investigation; however, the stress of the research started to affect her mental health, and she abandoned her research.

=== Connection with Canadian Olympic athlete, Priscilla Lopes-Schliep ===
After seeing a photo of a Canadian Olympic athlete by the name of Priscilla Lopes-Schliep, Viles believed she and Lopes-Schliep were among the few who had partial lipodystrophy. Priscilla Lopes-Schliep was exceptionally muscular, so much so that she often faced accusations of steroid use due to her remarkable physique in track and field. In 2016, Viles reached out to David Epstein, journalist and author of "The Sports Gene: Inside the Science of Extraordinary Athletic Performance," after his appearance on Good Morning America in 2016. Epstein became intrigued by Viles' research and agreed to help connect her with Lopes-Schliep.

Despite Lopes-Schliep boasting greater muscle mass, both exhibited comparable definition, owing to minimal body fat. Lopes-Schliep then enlisted the expertise of Dr. Abhimanyu Garg, an expert in lipodystrophy, who conducted comprehensive genetic testing and a thorough evaluation for lipodystrophy at the University of Texas Southwestern Medical Center.

The test results confirmed Viles' intuition. She and Lopes-Schliep shared a genetic link, both were diagnosed with the same subtype of partial lipodystrophy known as Dunnigan-type. Lopes-Schliep's nuclear membrane exhibited invagination and a non-circular shape, while Viles' variant in the lamin gene resulted in a rounded oval nucleus with highly disorganized genetic material in the cell cytoplasm.

== Personal life ==
Viles married Jeremy Viles in 2005. The couple had a son, Martin, who did not inherit any of the gene mutations associated with Viles' medical conditions. Viles died at her Iowa home on June 12, 2025.

== Writing experience ==
Aside from her research in the science field, Jill Viles also spent time writing books and articles to raise awareness about her condition and share her journey. Viles earned her master’s degree in creative writing from Iowa State University, her writing has appeared in Johns Hopkins Magazine, and her essay, “Loss of Control”, was recognized in the 88th Annual Writer’s Digest Writing Competition. Viles's memoir, Manufacturing My Miracle, was released posthumously in July 2025.

== Publications ==
- Viles, Jill Dopf (2025). Manufacturing My Miracle: One Woman's Quest to Create her Personalized Gene Therapy. Bloomsbury Academic. ISBN 978-1-538-19722-6.
- Dopf, Jill; Horiagon, Thomas M. (1996). "Deletion mapping of the Aequorea victoria green fluorescent protein". Gene. 173 (1): 39–44. doi:10.1016/0378-1119(95)00692-3. PMID 8707054.
- Dopf, Jill (November 2000). "Witches' Fingers Grab My Legs". Johns Hopkins Magazine. Baltimore, MD: The Johns Hopkins University.
- Walker, SG; Langland, CJ; Viles, J; Hecker, LA; Wallrath, LL (2023). "Drosophila Models Reveal Properties of Mutant Lamins That Give Rise to Distinct Diseases". Cells. 12 (8): 1142. doi:10.3390/cells12081142. PMC 10136830. PMID 37190051.
- Mohar, NP; Langland, CJ; Darr, Z; Viles, J; Moore, SA; Darbro, BW; Wallrath, LL (2025). "A genetic variant in SMAD7 acts as a modifier of LMNA-associated muscular dystrophy, implicating SMAD signaling as a therapeutic target". Science Advances. 11 (16) eads7903. Bibcode:2025SciA...11S7903M. doi:10.1126/sciadv.ads7903. PMC 12007578. PMID 40249815.
