= Aleesha Barber =

Trinidadian sprint hurdler

Personal information
- Nationality: Trinidad and Tobago
- Born: 16 May 1987 (age 39)

Sport
- Sport: Athletics
- Event: 100 metres hurdles
- College team: Penn State Nittany Lions (USA)

Achievements and titles
- Personal best: 100 m hurdles: 12.85 (2010)
Medal record
Women's athletics
Representing Trinidad and Tobago
Central American and Caribbean Games
Gold medal – first place	2010 Mayagüez	100 m hurdles

Aleesha Barber (born 16 May 1987) is a Trinidadian sprint hurdler. She is a 2007 NCAA All-American honoree, a six-time Big Ten Conference champion, and a seven-time collegiate record holder. She set a personal best time of 12.85 seconds at the 2010 NCAA Eastern First Round Championships on the campus of North Carolina A&T State University in Greensboro, North Carolina. Barber also won a gold medal for the 100 m hurdles at the 2010 Central American and Caribbean Games in Mayagüez, Puerto Rico, clocking at 13.09 seconds.

Barber represented Trinidad and Tobago at the 2008 Summer Olympics in Beijing, where she competed in the women's 100 m hurdles. She ran in the fifth and final heat against seven other athletes, including Jamaica's Brigitte Foster-Hylton, and United States' Dawn Harper, who later dominated this event by winning an Olympic gold medal. She finished the race in fourth place by two hundredths of a second (0.02) behind Kazakhstan's Anastassiya Pilipenko, with a national record-breaking time of 13.01 seconds. Barber, however, failed to advance into the semi-finals, as she placed eighteenth overall, and was ranked below two mandatory slots for the next round.

Barber is also a member of the track and field team for the Penn State Nittany Lions, and a management graduate at Penn State University in University Park, Pennsylvania.

== See also ==
- List of Pennsylvania State University Olympians
