= Sally Pearson =

Australian athlete (born 1986)

Sally Pearson OAM
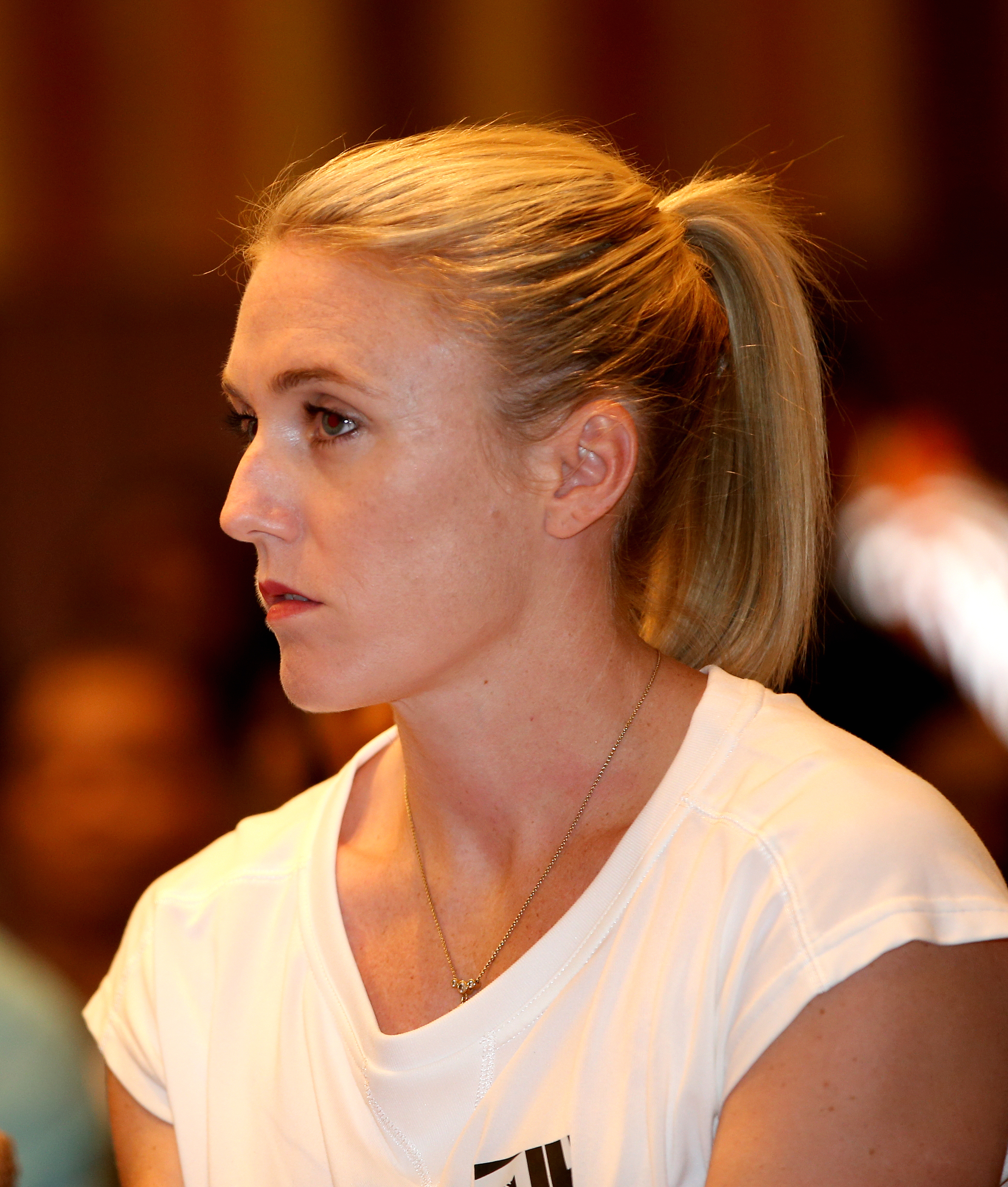
- Sally Pearson in 2015

Personal information
- Nationality: Australian
- Born: 19 September 1986 (age 40) Sydney, Australia
- Height: 1.67 m (5 ft 6 in)
- Weight: 60 kg (132 lb)
- Website: Official Facebook Page

Sport
- Country: Australia
- Sport: Track and field
- Events: 100 metres sprint, 200 metre sprint, 100 metres hurdles and 200 metre hurdles
- Coached by: Sharon Hannan and Peter Hannan; Self-coached
- Retired: 5 August 2019

Achievements and titles
- Olympic finals: 100 m hurdles and 100 metre sprints
- Personal bests: 11.14s–100 Metre Sprint; 12.28s–100 m Hurdles; 22.97s–200 m sprint 1:02.98–400 m Hurdles; 7.16s–60 Metre Sprint
Medal record
Olympic Games
Gold medal – first place	2012 London	100 m hurdles
Silver medal – second place	2008 Beijing	100 m hurdles
World Championships
Gold medal – first place	2011 Daegu	100 m hurdles
Gold medal – first place	2017 London	100 m hurdles
Silver medal – second place	2013 Moscow	100 m hurdles
World Indoor Athletics Championships
Gold medal – first place	2012 Istanbul	60 m hurdles
Silver medal – second place	2014 Sopot	60 m hurdles
Diamond League
First place	2017	100 m hurdles
Commonwealth Games
Gold medal – first place	2010 Delhi	100 m hurdles
Gold medal – first place	2014 Glasgow	100 m hurdles
Bronze medal – third place	2006 Melbourne	4 × 100 m relay
Continental Cup
Gold medal – first place	2010 Split	100 m hurdles
World Junior Championships
Bronze medal – third place	2004 Grosseto	100 m
World Youth Championships
Gold medal – first place	2003 Sherbrooke	100 m hurdles

Sally Pearson, OAM (née McLellan; born 19 September 1986) is a retired Australian athlete who competed in the 100 metre hurdles. She is the 2011 and 2017 World champion and 2012 Olympic champion in the 100 metres hurdles. She also won a silver medal in the 100 m hurdles at the 2008 Summer Olympics and the 2013 World Championships.

== Athletic career ==
Sally Pearson was born in Sydney and moved to Birdsville, Queensland when she was eight years old, before eventually settling on the Gold Coast. It was there, while she was still in primary school, that her athletic talents were noticed by Sharon Hannan, who coached her until 2013. Pearson rose to prominence in 2001, when at the age of only 14, she won the Australian Youth 100 m and 90 m hurdles titles. After injury setbacks during 2002 she made her international debut at the 2003 World Youth Championships in Sherbrooke, Canada and won gold in the 100 m hurdles. The following month, still only 16 years old, she represented Australia at open level at the 2003 World Championships in Paris, France as part of the 4 × 100 m relay team. In 2004, she won a bronze in the 100 m at the World Junior Championships, and just missed out on a medal in the 100 m hurdles.

At the 2006 Commonwealth Games in Melbourne, Pearson tripped over a hurdle and fell to the ground during the 100 m hurdles final, costing her the chance of a medal. In 2007, she continued to pursue both the 100 m and the 100 m hurdles, making the semi-final of each event at the World Championships in Osaka, Japan. However, in the lead up to the 2008 Olympic Games, she shifted her focus solely to the 100 m hurdles. This decision paid off, with Pearson claiming the silver medal in a dramatic final, where the favourite Lolo Jones stumbled and a photo finish was required to decide the minor medals. After the announcement of the official results a jubilant Pearson celebrated enthusiastically with bronze medal winner Priscilla Lopes-Schliep, and gave an emotional trackside interview.

Pearson was in good form during the 2009 European season, winning five out of seven races and breaking the Australian and Oceanian record in the 100 m hurdles at the Herculis meeting in July, with a time of 12.50 seconds; 0.03 faster than the area record she had set on the same track a year earlier. However, she was hampered by back spasms in the lead up to the World Championships in Berlin, and was only able to finish fifth in the 100 m hurdles final.

=== 2010 Commonwealth Games ===
At the 2010 Commonwealth Games in Delhi, India, Pearson competed in the 100 m sprint in addition to the 100 m hurdles. In the final of the 100 m she recorded a false start, along with English runner Laura Turner, but was allowed to line up for the restart, crossing the finish line first in a time of 11.28s. However a protest was lodged after the race, which resulted in a distraught Pearson being disqualified. Three nights later she went on to win gold in the 100 m hurdles final in 12.67 seconds. Pearson was also controversially included in the Australian team for the final of the women's 4 × 400 m relay, an event she had not trained for, and collapsed after running the anchor leg, the Australian team having finished in fifth place. Even though she thought she had let the team down, her teammates comforted her.

At the beginning of the next season, she won the 100 m, 200 m and 100 m hurdles to become the first Australian woman to win three national titles at the same event since Pam Kilborn had done in 1968.

=== 2011 World championships ===
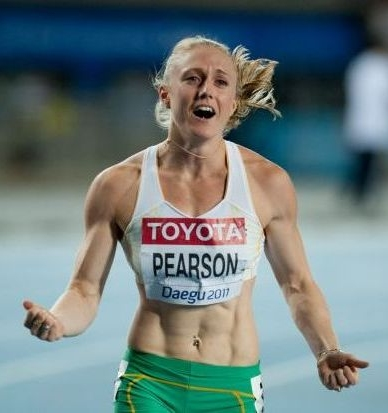
Pearson at the 2011 World Championships

At the 2011 World Championships in Daegu, South Korea, Pearson ran a 100 m hurdles time of 12.28s (+1.1), the fourth fastest time in history, following the semi-finals where she produced the equal fifth fastest time in history of 12.36s (+0.3) to beat her own Oceanian area record and Australian national record.

=== 2012 Olympics ===
Coming into the 2012 London Olympics, for the 100 m hurdles Pearson had won 32 races from 34 starts. She led the competition after Round 1 heats with 12.57 and lead coming into the final with a semi-final time of 12.39. Pearson won gold with a new Olympic record time of 12.35s (Wind (m/s): -0.2) beating out Americans Dawn Harper, 12.37, and Kellie Wells, 12.48, who both recorded personal bests.

=== 2015 ===
At the Golden Gala, Pearson fell over a hurdle badly mid-race. She suffered a "bone explosion" of her left forearm and broke her wrist. The traumatic injury ruined the remainder of her 2015 season.

=== 2016 ===
Sally Pearson was set to be a strong contender to defend her gold medal title she won at the London 2012 Olympics. However, during a hard training session Pearson slightly tore her hamstring forcing her out of the Rio 2016 games.

=== 2017 World championships ===
Pearson won the gold medal in the 100 metres hurdles at the 2017 World Championships in London with a time of 12.59.

=== 2018 Commonwealth Games ===
Pearson was to compete in the 100 metre hurdles and 4 × 100 relay but later withdrew due to an Achilles tendon injury.

== Retirement ==
On 5 August 2019, Pearson announced her retirement from competitive athletics, stating that she did not believe that she would be ready for the 2020 Olympic Games. Pearson stated: "It has been a long 16 years, but also a fun and exciting 16 years. My body has decided it is time to let it go, and move forward onto a new direction."

In February 2022, Pearson joined Seven News Gold Coast as a sport presenter. She remained in the role until Seven News Gold Coast was axed in November 2024.

In May 2023, it was announced that Pearson would be participating in the twentieth series of Dancing with the Stars. She was paired with Mitch Kirkby.

In February 2025, Pearson joined Sunrise as a reporter.

== Recognition ==
- 2008/2009 – Athletics Australia Female Athlete of the Year.
- 2011 – Female Athlete of the Year. She is the first Australian to receive this award. Pearson also received prizemoney of A$ 98,800($US76,117).
- 2011 – "Key to the City of Gold Coast".
- 2012 – Athletics Australia Female Athlete of the Year.
- 2012 – Sport Australia Hall of Fame The Don Award
- 2012 – Queensland Sports Star of the Year.
- 2013 – National Finalist Young Australian of the Year
- 2014 – Medal of the Order of Australia (OAM) for service to sport as a gold medallist at the London 2012 Olympic Games.
- 2014 – Sport Australia Hall of Fame The Don Award.
- 2014 – Women's Health Sports Woman
- 2017 – Australian Institute of Sport Female Athlete of the Year
- 2017 – Athletics Australia Female Athlete of the Year.
- 2018 – Gold Coast 2018 Commonwealth Games final Queens Baton Relay runner
- 2024 – Sport Australia Hall of Fame inductee

== Personal life ==
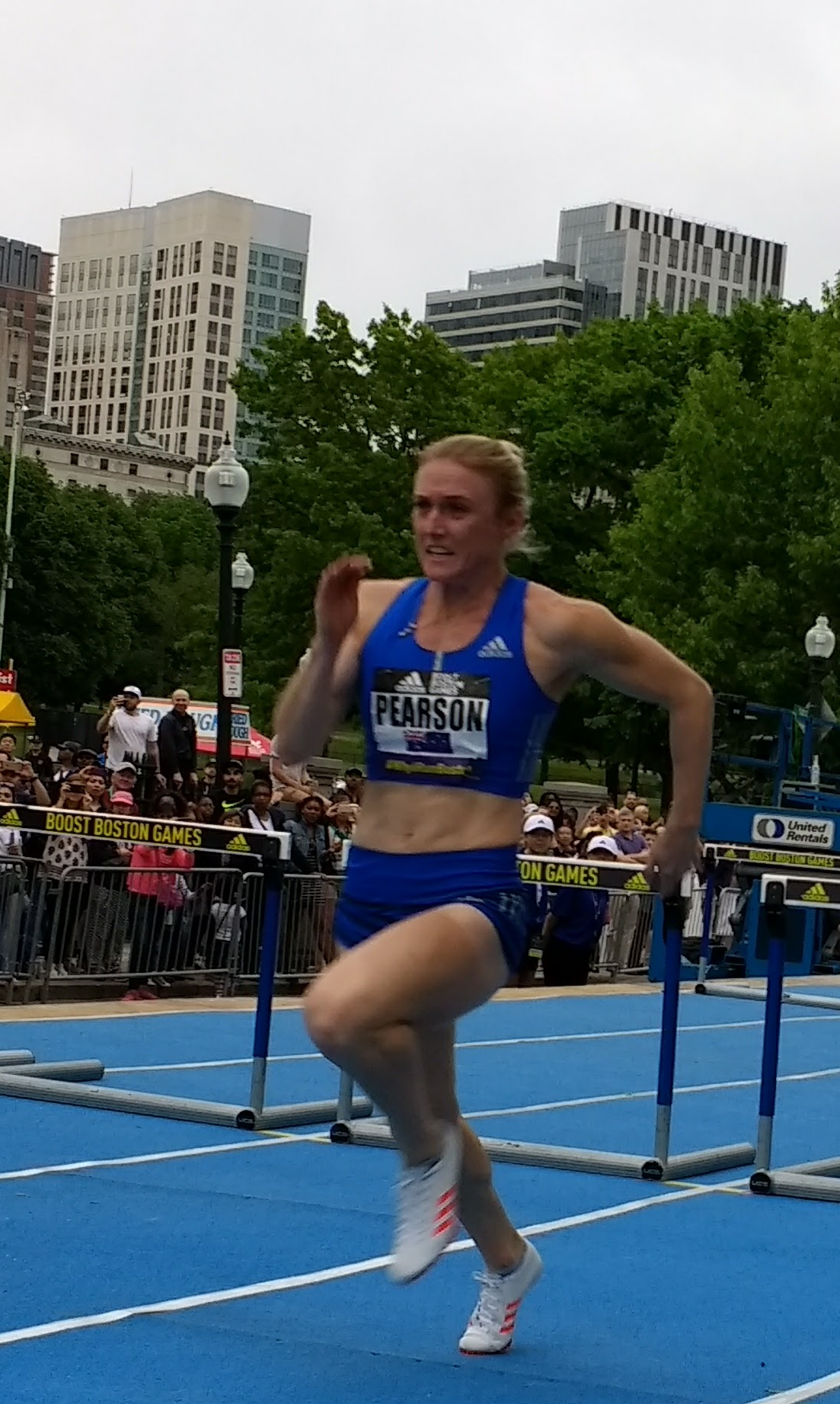
Pearson at the 2017 Boost Boston Games

Pearson was raised by her single mother Anne, who worked two jobs to make enough money to support her daughter's athletic career.

In late 2008 she became engaged to Kieran Pearson, the pair having been together since their senior year at Helensvale State High School on Queensland's Gold Coast. In April 2010 they married on the Gold Coast and have two children.

== Achievements ==
Year	Competition	Venue	Position	Event	Notes
Representing Australia
2003	World Youth Championships	Sherbrooke, Canada	5th	200 m	24.01
2003	World Youth Championships	Sherbrooke, Canada	1st	100 m hurdles (76.2 cm)	13.42
2003	World Championships	Paris, France	14th (heats)	4 × 100 m relay	44.11
2004	World Junior Championships	Grosseto, Italy	3rd	100 m	11.40 (wind: +1.5 m/s)
2004	World Junior Championships	Grosseto, Italy	4th	100 m hurdles	13.41 (wind: -1.0 m/s)
2004	World Junior Championships	Grosseto, Italy	5th	4 × 100 m relay	45.10
2006	Commonwealth Games	Melbourne, Australia	7th	100 m	11.50
2006	Commonwealth Games	Melbourne, Australia	3rd	4 × 100 m relay	44.25
2006	World Cup	Athens, Greece	8th	100 m	11.44
2006	World Cup	Athens, Greece	4th	100 m hurdles	12.95
2006	World Cup	Athens, Greece	5th	4 × 100 m relay	44.26
2007	World Championships	Osaka, Japan	15th (semis)	100 m	11.32
2007	World Championships	Osaka, Japan	10th (semis)	100 m hurdles	12.82
2007	World Championships	Osaka, Japan	14th (heats)	4 × 100 m relay	43.91
2008	Olympic Games	Beijing, China	2nd	100 m hurdles	12.64
2009	World Championships	Berlin, Germany	5th	100 m hurdles	12.70
2010	IAAF Continental Cup	Split, Croatia	1st	100 m hurdles	12.65
2010	Commonwealth Games	New Delhi, India	DQ	100 m	-
2010	Commonwealth Games	New Delhi, India	1st	100 m hurdles	12.67
2010	Commonwealth Games	New Delhi, India	4th	4 × 400 m relay	3:30.29
2011	World Championships	Daegu, South Korea	1st	100 m hurdles	12.28
2011	World Championships	Daegu, South Korea	10th (heats)	4 × 100 m relay	43.79
2012	World Indoor Championships	Istanbul, Turkey	1st	60 m hurdles	7.73
2012	Olympic Games	London, United Kingdom	1st	100 m hurdles	12.35
2013	World Championships	Moscow, Russia	2nd	100 m hurdles	12.50
2014	World Indoor Championships	Sopot, Poland	2nd	60 m hurdles	7.85
2014	Commonwealth Games	Glasgow, Scotland	1st	100 m hurdles	12.67
2017	World Championships	London, England	1st	100 m hurdles	12.59
2018	World Indoor Championships	Birmingham, England	9th (semis)	60 m hurdles	7.92

=== Personal bests ===
- 100 metres – 11.14 secs (2007)
- 200 metres – 22.97 secs (2015)
- 100 metres hurdles – 12.28 secs (2011) (eighth fastest time in history)

== Records ==
Record	Performance	Date	Meet	Place
Oceania	12.28	3 September 2011	World Championships	Daegu, South Korea

Awards
Preceded by Blanka Vlašić	IAAF World Athlete of the Year; 2011	Succeeded by Allyson Felix
