= Yvette Lewis (athlete) =

American-Panamanian triple jumper and hurdler

Personal information
- Born: March 16, 1985 (age 41) Flensburg, Germany
- Height: 1.75 m (5 ft 9 in)
- Weight: 75 kg (165 lb)

Sport
- Sport: Track and field
- Event: Hurdling
Medal record
Women's athletics
Representing the United States
Pan American Games
Gold medal – first place	2011 Guadalajara	100 m hurdles
Silver medal – second place	2011 Guadalajara	4×100 m relay
Representing Panama
Bolivarian Games
Silver medal – second place	2013 Trujillo	100 m hurdles
- Updated on 3 January 2015

Yvette Lewis (born March 16, 1985) is a German-born American track and field athlete who competes for Panama in the 100 meter hurdles and the triple jump. She represented the United States in international competition until October 2012 when switched to compete for Panama. Her best time in the hurdles is 12.76 seconds while her best triple jump is 13.84 meters. She won the gold medal in the hurdles at the 2011 Pan American Games

She represented Hampton University collegiately and was the NCAA triple jump champion indoors in 2006 and outdoors in 2007. She has represented the United States twice at the Pan American Games (2007 and 2011) as was a silver medalist in the 4×100 meter relay in 2011.

== Career ==
Lewis was born in Flensburg, Germany, as her family was based there due to her father Donnie Lewis placement in the army. Her mother, Lorna Dowlin, had competed athletically, but had given up pursuing sports in order to focus on her family. Raised in Newport News, Virginia, Lewis initially competed in a variety of events, but made her international debut as a triple jumper at the 2004 World Junior Championships in Athletics.

She went on to compete in NCAA Division I for Hampton University's Lady Pirates. While there, she represented the university in a variety of events, including triple jump, hurdles, long jump and the short sprints. At the 2005 USA Indoor Track and Field Championships she came eight in the long jump and seventh in the triple jump. In 2006, she became the NCAA Indoor Champion in the triple jump with a personal record mark of 13.75 meters. At the NCAA Outdoor Championship later that year she came fourth with a jump of 13.59 m and was a 100 m hurdles semi-finalist. She made her debut at the USA Outdoor Track and Field Championships and claimed the triple jump bronze medal, as well as setting a hurdles personal record of 13.14 seconds in the semi-finals of that event. She represented her country in the triple jump at the 2006 NACAC Under-23 Championships in Athletics and finished in fourth place.

At the 2007 NCAA Indoors, Lewis was the runner-up in the triple jump and had minor placings in the hurdles and long jump. Greater success came outdoors as she became the 2007 NCAA triple jump champion with a jump of 13.73 m and reached the 100 m hurdles final with a new best run of 13.06 seconds. A jump of 13.59 m at the USA Nationals brought her second place behind Shani Marks and she was yet again a hurdles semi-finalist. Despite her high national placing, she could not compete at the 2007 World Championships in Athletics as she had not achieved the necessary qualifying standard. However, she was selected to compete in both events for the American team for the 2007 Pan American Games. At that competition, she came sixth in the triple jump and last in the hurdles final.

Having graduated from Hampton in 2007, she turned to professional competitions in 2008. She dipped under 13 seconds for the hurdles for the first time that year and ran a personal record of 12.87 seconds in the United States Olympic Trials semi-finals. She was a triple jump finalist at the event, but finished just outside the top three in spite of a new best jump of 13.84 m. Having missed qualification for the 2008 Beijing Olympics, she competed on the European track circuit and ran a 100 m hurdles best of 12.85 seconds at the Herculis meeting. She ended her year at the DAK Leichtathletik-Gala, coming sixth in the triple jump and third in the hurdles.

Her 2009 season began at European indoor meets: she won the 60 meter hurdles at the PSD Bank Meeting then ran a new best time of 8.05 seconds at the BW-Bank Meeting. The Birmingham Indoor Grand Prix saw her compete in a three-event challenge, where she won the hurdles and set new indoor bests in the long jump (6.29 m) and 400 metres (56.63 seconds) to finish in second place overall. She returned to the United States for the outdoor season and made her impact at the Mt. SAC Relays, winning the 100 m hurdles and coming second in the triple jump behind Shakeema Welsch. She came close to a new personal best at the adidas Track Classic, where she won the triple jump in a meet record of 13.82 m. Following wins in the hurdles at the Primo Nebiolo and Josef Odložil Memorial meetings in Europe, she competed at the 2009 USA Outdoor Track and Field Championships and reached the hurdles semi-finals and triple jumped a windy 13.88 m for fourth place in that event. Having missed out on the major championships again, she returned to hurdling in Europe and equalled her best time to win at the International Leichtathletik-Sportfest in Cuxhaven.

Lewis focused on hurdling for the 2010 season and ran well in Europe, achieving a new 60 m hurdles best of 7.90 seconds and finishing as runner-up at the PSD Bank, BW-Bank, and Sparkassen Cup meets. She competed sparingly in the outdoor season due to a serious injury to her right ankle. After running on the European indoor circuit in early 2011, she came third in the hurdles at the USA Indoor Championships. At the 2011 USA Outdoor Championships, she was fifth in the triple jump and reached the hurdles final, although she was disqualified for a false start. She competed in the hurdles at a number of 2011 IAAF Diamond League meets that year, including a second-place finish at the Memorial Van Damme final. A new personal record of 12.76 seconds came at the inaugural István Gyulai Memorial in Budapest and she broke the meeting record at the Palio Citta della Quercia with a run of 12.87 seconds into a headwind. She helped the United States top the table at the DécaNation with a hurdles win and was then selected for the national team at the 2011 Pan American Games. She excelled at the continental competition by taking the hurdles gold medal in a time of 12.82 seconds in the altitude of Guadalajara. This made her the first American medalist in the hurdles event in twelve years and the first American winner since LaVonna Martin 24 years previously. She won a second medal for her country in the 4×100 meter relay race, where the American team took the silver, and she also managed seventh place in the triple jump.

== Personal bests ==
=== Outdoor ===
- 100 m: 11.56 (wind: +1.9 m/s) – (United States) New York City, 13 July 2007
- 200 m: 23.50 (wind: +0.3 m/s) – (United States) Greensboro, North Carolina, 5 May 2006
- 100 m hurdles: 12.67 (wind: +1.5 m/s) – (Finland) Lahti, 17 July 2013
- Triple jump: 13.84 m (wind: +0.5 m/s) – (United States) Eugene, Oregon, 17 July 2013
- Heptathlon: 5378 pts – (United States) Chula Vista, California, 9 June 2012

== Achievements ==
Year	Competition	Venue	Position	Event	Notes
Representing the United States
2004	World Junior Championships	Grosseto, Italy	15th (q)	Triple jump	12.96 m (wind: +0.2 m/s)
2006	NACAC U-23 Championships	Santo Domingo, Dominican Republic	4th	Triple jump	13.30 m (wind: +0.8 m/s)
2007	Pan American Games	Rio de Janeiro, Brazil	8th	100 m hurdles	13.69 (wind: +0.0 m/s)
2007	Pan American Games	Rio de Janeiro, Brazil	6th	Triple jump	13.49 m (wind: -0.4 m/s)
2011	Pan American Games	Guadalajara, Mexico	1st	100 m hurdles	12.81 (wind: +0.2 m/s)
2011	Pan American Games	Guadalajara, Mexico	7th	Triple jump	13.17 m (wind: +0.3 m/s)
2011	Pan American Games	Guadalajara, Mexico	2nd	4 × 100 m relay	43.10
2011	DécaNation	Nice, France	1st	100 m hurdles	12.84
Representing Panama
2013	Bolivarian Games	Trujillo, Peru	2nd	100 m hurdles	13.20 (wind: +0.1 m/s)
2014	World Indoor Championships	Sopot, Poland	9th (sf)	60 m hurdles	8.00
2014	South American Games	Santiago, Chile	1st	100 m hurdles	13.11 (wind: -1.6 m/s)
2014	Ibero-American Championships	São Paulo, Brazil	1st	100 m hurdles	13.05 (wind: +0.1 m/s)
2014	Pan American Sports Festival	Mexico City, Mexico	1st	100m hurdles	12.86 A (wind: 0.9 m/s)
2015	South American Championships	Lima, Peru	4th (h)	200m	24.64 (wind: -1.3 m/s)
2015	South American Championships	Lima, Peru	1st	100m hurdles	13.31 (wind: -2.2 m/s)
2015	World Championships	Beijing, China	36th (h)	100 m hurdles	14.12
2016	Olympic Games	Rio de Janeiro, Brazil	42nd (h)	100 m hurdles	13.35
