= Athletics at the 2007 Pan American Games – Women's 100 metres hurdles =

Women's 100 metres hurdles at the Pan American Games

The women's 100 metres hurdles event at the 2007 Pan American Games was held on July 24–25.

== Medalists ==
Gold	Silver	Bronze
Delloreen Ennis-London; Jamaica	Perdita Felicien; Canada	Angela Whyte; Canada

== Results ==
=== Heats ===
Qualification: First 2 of each heat (Q) and the next 2 fastest (q) qualified for the final.

Wind:
Heat 1: +0.6 m/s, Heat 2: +0.9 m/s, Heat 3: +0.2 m/s

Rank	Heat	Name	Nationality	Time	Notes
1	2	Angela Whyte	Canada	12.68	Q
2	3	Perdita Felicien	Canada	12.69	Q, SB
3	3	Anay Tejeda	Cuba	12.80	Q
4	1	Delloreen Ennis-London	Jamaica	12.81	Q
5	2	Vonette Dixon	Jamaica	12.86	Q
6	1	Jenny Adams	United States	13.15	Q
7	2	Nadine Faustin-Parker	Haiti	13.24	q, SB
8	3	Yvette Lewis	United States	13.25	q
9	1	Yenima Arencibia	Cuba	13.32	
10	3	Tivanna Thompson	Bahamas	13.33	
11	1	Briggite Merlano	Colombia	13.35	
12	3	Fabiana Moraes	Brazil	13.75	
13	1	Soledad Donzino	Argentina	13.76	
14	2	Jeimmy Bernardez	Honduras	14.05	
15	1	Janielle Brathwaite	Barbados	14.26	
16	2	Leniece Lewis	British Virgin Islands	15.10	
	2	Gilvaneide Parrela	Brazil	DNS	

=== Final ===
Wind: 0.0 m/s

Rank	Lane	Name	Nationality	Time	Notes
1st place, gold medalist(s)	3	Delloreen Ennis-London	Jamaica	12.65	GR
2nd place, silver medalist(s)	4	Perdita Felicien	Canada	12.65	
3rd place, bronze medalist(s)	5	Angela Whyte	Canada	12.72	
4	2	Vonette Dixon	Jamaica	12.86	
5	6	Anay Tejeda	Cuba	12.95	
6	7	Jenny Adams	United States	13.15	
7	8	Nadine Faustin-Parker	Haiti	13.26	
8	1	Yvette Lewis	United States	13.69	
