= Vonette Dixon =

Jamaican hurdler (born 1975)

Personal information
- Born: 26 November 1975 (age 50) Manchester Parish, Jamaica

Sport
- Sport: Track and field
- Club: Auburn Tigers
Medal record
Representing Jamaica
Commonwealth Games
Silver medal – second place	2002 Manchester	100m hurdles

Vonette Dixon (born 26 November 1975) is a Jamaican hurdler.

Competing for the Auburn Tigers track and field team, Dixon won the 2000 60 meter hurdles at the NCAA Division I Indoor Track and Field Championships in a time of 7.94.

She finished eighth at the 2001 World Championships in Edmonton, won a silver medal at the 2002 Commonwealth Games in Manchester and finished ninth at the 2003 World Championships in Paris. She finished seventh at the 2007 World Championships in Osaka.

Her personal best time is 12.64 seconds, achieved in August 2007 in Osaka.

== Competition record ==
Year	Competition	Venue	Position	Event	Notes
Representing Jamaica
2001	World Championships	Edmonton, Canada	8th	100 m H	13.02
2001	Goodwill Games	Brisbane, Australia	7th	100 m H	13.12
2002	Commonwealth Games	Manchester, United Kingdom	2nd	100 m H	12.83
2003	Central American and Caribbean Championships	St. George's, Grenada	3rd	100 m H	13.35
2003	World Championships	Paris, France	9th	100 m H	12.87
2003	World Championships	Paris, France	8th	4 × 100 m	DNF
2005	World Championships	Helsinki, Finland	17th (sf)	100 m H	13.08
2007	Pan American Games	Rio de Janeiro, Brazil	4th	100 m H	12.86
2007	World Championships	Osaka, Japan	7th	100 m H	12.64
2008	Olympic Games	Beijing, China	9th (sf)	100 m H	12.86
2010	World Indoor Championships	Doha, Qatar	6th	60 m H	7.99
2011	Central American and Caribbean Championships	Mayagüez, Puerto Rico	1st	100 m H	12.77
2011	World Championships	Daegu, South Korea	17th (sf)	100 m H	13.00
2012	World Indoor Championships	Istanbul, Turkey	–	60 m H	DNF
