= Kylie Robilliard =

Giernésiais athlete

Kylie Robilliard (born 11 June 1988) is an athlete from Guernsey, who most notably took part in the 2010 Commonwealth Games. She set a personal best in the first round of the women's 100m event but did not qualify for the semi-finals. In her main event the 100m Hurdles, she placed 4th in heat 2 in a time of 13.94sec. Narrowly missing out on the final, she placed 9th over all.

She was awarded the Lambourne Shield for outstanding sporting achievement by a boy or girl under 18 at the Guernsey's Sporting Achievement Awards in February 2004.

She won a silver medal in the women's 100m and a gold medal in the women's 100m hurdles at the Island Games held in Åland, Finland in 2009.

In 2011, she participated in the 2011 Island Games and won a gold medal in the 100m. She broke the Island Games record with a time of 11.94 seconds.
