= Priscilla Lopes-Schliep =

Canadian hurdler (born 1982)

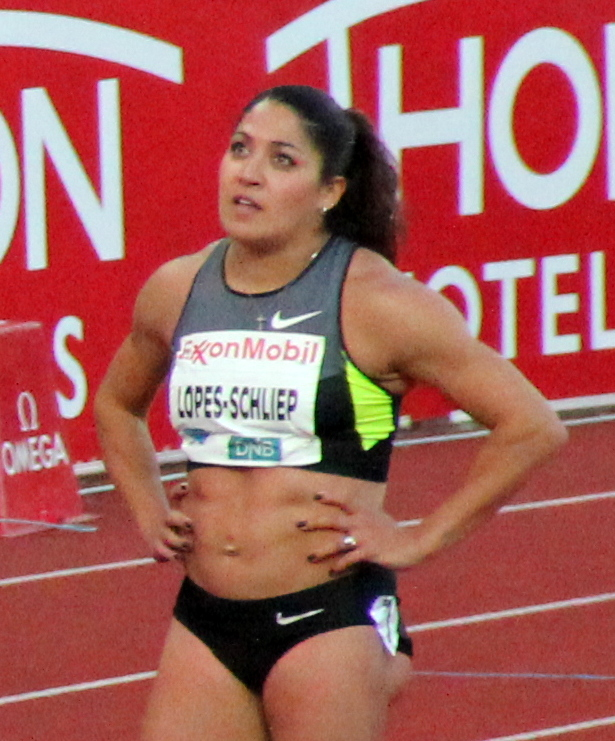
- Lopes-Schliep at the 2012 Bislett Games

Personal information
- Nationality: Canada
- Born: Priscilla Lopes; 26 August 1982 (age 44) Scarborough, Ontario, Canada
- Home town: Whitby, Ontario, Canada
- Height: 1.63 m (5 ft 4 in)
- Weight: 67 kg (148 lb)
- Spouse: Bronsen Schliep (m. 2007)
Medal record
Women's athletics
Representing Canada
Summer Olympic Games
Bronze medal – third place	2008 Beijing	100 m hurdles
World Championships
Silver medal – second place	2009 Berlin	100 m hurdles
World Indoor Championships
Bronze medal – third place	2010 Doha	60 m hurdles

Priscilla Lopes-Schliep, née Priscilla Lopes, (born 26 August 1982) is a Canadian retired hurdler in track and field athletic competition. She was born in Scarborough, Ontario, and currently lives in Whitby.

== Personal ==
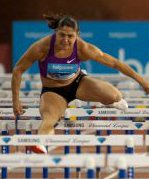
Priscilla Lopes-Schliep during 2010 Memorial Van Damme

Born in Scarborough, Ontario, Lopes-Schliep's heritage is Guyanese and Portuguese. She is the first cousin of soccer player Dwayne De Rosario.

Lopes-Schliep attended the University of Nebraska–Lincoln. She married former University of Nebraska basketball player Bronsen Schliep in the fall of 2007. They currently reside in Toronto, where he practices dentistry.

== Career ==
In 2004 Priscilla became the 2004 NCAA Indoor Champion in the 60 meter hurdles with a time of 7.82 as her personal best. Lopes-Schliep won a bronze medal at the 2008 Summer Olympics in women's 100 m hurdles. It was the first medal for Canada in Athletics at the Summer Olympics since the 1996 Games and the first medal for a Canadian woman in Olympic track and field since the 1992 Games.

At the 2009 World Championships in Athletics, Lopes-Schliep won a silver medal in the 100 m hurdles in Berlin, Germany, in a time of 12.54s. She failed to qualify for the 2012 London Olympics, having finished 7th in the 100m hurdles at the 2012 Canadian Olympic trials for track and field after she struck a hurdle and fell.

== Genetics ==
Lopes-Schliep has the LMNA R482W gene mutation, and was diagnosed with Dunnigan-type Lipodystrophy. The diagnosis came from DIY research conducted by Jill Dopf Viles, an Iowa mother without any medical training but who had Emery–Dreifuss muscular dystrophy and who spotted physical similarities between herself and Lopes-Schliep, and encouraged her to undergo genetic testing. The results confirmed Dunnigan-type Lipodystrophy, and alerted Lopes-Schliep to a potential pancreatitis attack due to the high levels of fat in her blood, though this was avoided by modifying her diet.

== Personal bests ==
Event	Time (sec)	Venue	Date
50 metres hurdles	6.82	Stockholm, Sweden	21 February 2008
55 metres hurdles	7.51	Fresno, California, United States	21 January 2008
60 metres hurdles	7.82	Stuttgart, Germany	6 February 2010
100 metres hurdles	12.49	Brussels, Belgium	4 September 2009
60 metres	7.23	Lincoln, Nebraska, United States	26 February 2005
100 metres	11.44	Victoria, British Columbia, Canada	19 July 2003
200 metres (indoor)	23.50	Lincoln, Nebraska, United States	25 February 2006

- All information taken from IAAF profile.
