= Damu Cherry-Mitchell =

American hurdler (born 1977)

Damu Cherry
Personal information
- Born: November 29, 1977 (age 48) Tampa, Florida, U.S.
- Height: 5 ft 4 in (1.63 m)
- Spouse: Dennis Mitchell
- Website: DamuCherry.com

Sport
- Country: United States
- Sport: Hurdling

Damu Cherry-Mitchell (born November 29, 1977, in Tampa, Florida) is an American hurdler. Her personal best time is 12.44 seconds, achieved in July 2006 in Lausanne.

Cherry-Mitchell competed for the University of South Florida in college. She finished seventh at the 2006 World Indoor Championships and second at the 2006 World Athletics Final. She qualified for the 2008 Olympic team and ended up taking fourth in the hurdles final. She was banned for two years by the IAAF for failing an out-of-competition drugs test in 2003. She tested positive for norandrosterone, a metabolite of an anabolic steroid.

== Personal life ==
Cherry-Mitchell is married to former Olympian Dennis Mitchell and has four kids with him.

One of her children, Malachi, plays for the Savannah Bananas under the pseudonym “Flash Tha Kid”.
