= Dawn Harper-Nelson =

American hurdler (born 1984)

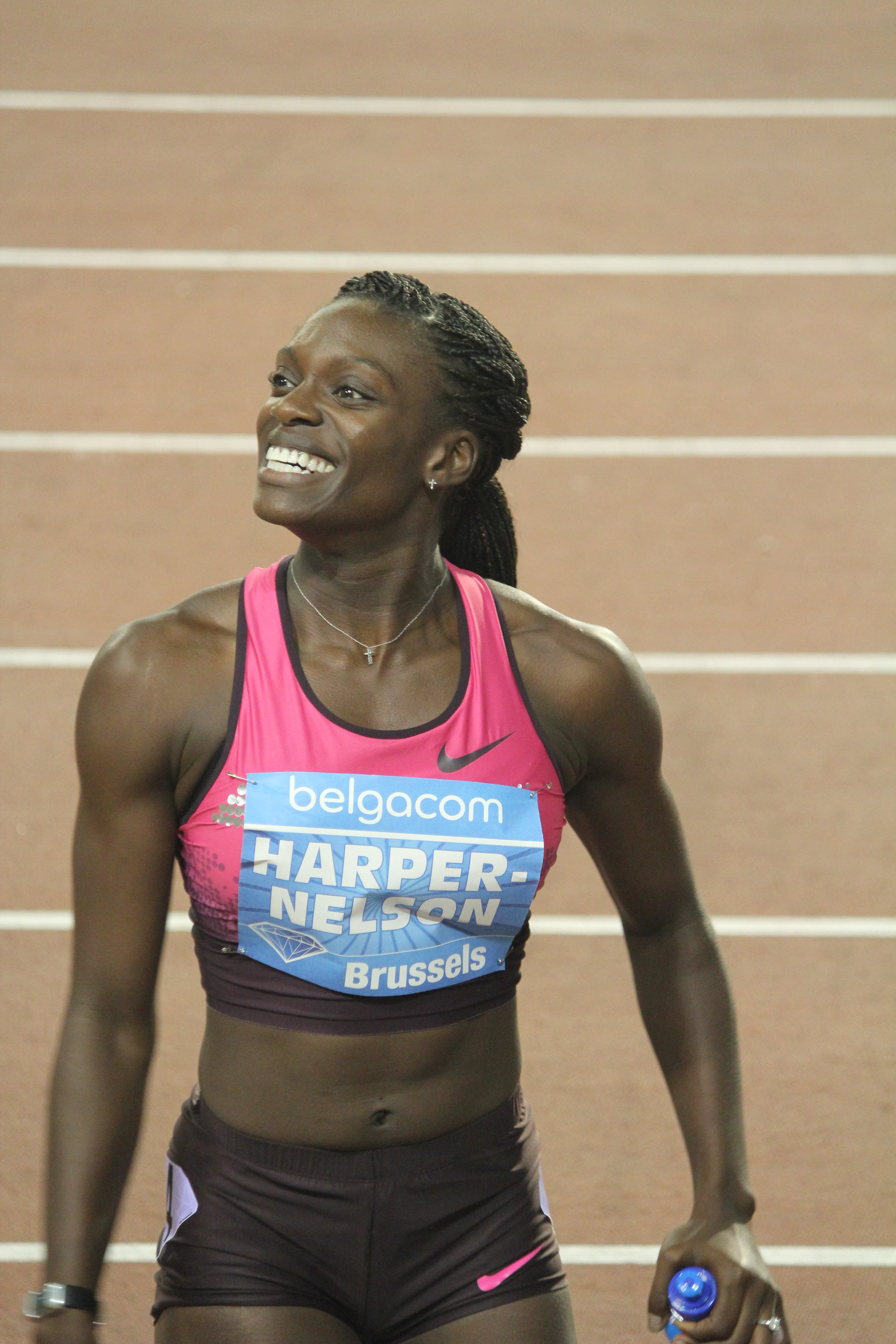
- Harper-Nelson in 2013

Personal information
- Nationality: American
- Born: May 13, 1984 (age 42) East St. Louis, Illinois
- Height: 5 ft 6 in (168 cm)
- Weight: 134 lb (61 kg)

Sport
- College team: UCLA Bruins
Medal record
Women's athletics
Representing the United States
Olympic Games
Gold medal – first place	2008 Beijing	100 m hurdles
Silver medal – second place	2012 London	100 m hurdles
World Championships
Silver medal – second place	2017 London	100 m hurdles
Bronze medal – third place	2011 Daegu	100 m hurdles
IAAF Continental Cup
Gold medal – first place	2014 Marrakech	100 metre hurdles
NACAC U23 Championships in Athletics
Gold medal – first place	2006 Santo Domingo	100 metre hurdles
Pan American Junior Championships
Gold medal – first place	2003 Bridgetown	100 m hurdles

Dawn Harper-Nelson (née Harper; born May 13, 1984) is an American, retired track and field athlete who specialized in the 100-meter hurdles. She was the gold medalist in the event at the 2008 Beijing Olympic Games and the silver medalist in the 2012 London Olympic Games and the 2017 World Championships. She was trained by Bob Kersee, husband of Jackie Joyner-Kersee. She is a member of the 2022 class of the UCLA Athletics Hall of Fame.

== High school and collegiate career ==
In high school, Harper showed much promise in the sport by winning her first IHSA 2A state championship and breaking the Illinois state record in the 100 m hurdles her freshman year with a time of 14.03. In her freshman year, she also won the 300 m hurdles with a time of 42.70. Her sophomore year was met with much adversity when she tore her posterior cruciate ligament (PCL) and meniscus before the IHSA sectional meet. With a torn PCL and meniscus, Harper still earned a silver medal in the 100 m hurdles, but the discomfort moved her coach, Nino Fennoy, to scratch her from the 300 m hurdle finals. She broke her own Illinois state record in the 100 m hurdles her junior year with a time of 13.54. That record time still currently stands. Senior year Harper came back and defended her titles winning her third state final in the 100 m hurdles with a time of 13.82 and the 300 m hurdles. Harper graduated from East St. Louis Senior High as a 6-time IHSA state champion.

During her time with the UCLA Bruins, Harper won the sprint hurdles at the US Junior Championships and at the Pan American Junior Athletics Championships. She received All-American honours twice at the 2004 NCAA Women's Outdoor Track and Field Championship, after coming eighth in the 100 m hurdles final and taking second place in the 4 × 100-meter relay.

== 2008: First Olympics ==
Harper had a rough start to the 2008 season when she suffered an injury that required arthroscopic surgery in February. This was right before the outdoor season began. However, four months later, she made it to her first Olympic team at the U.S. Olympic Trials, squeaking into third place by .007 seconds. During training for the 2008 Beijing Olympics, she struggled with getting sponsors, but was given a hand by her teammate, injured hurdler Michelle Perry, when she was given a pair of spikes. These were the pair Harper raced in through the Olympics.

Harper, then 24 years old, won her first Olympic gold medal for 100 m hurdles with a time of 12.54 seconds, a new personal best for Harper. It was a surprise win amid crushing losses to US Olympic track-and-field team favorites, Lolo Jones and Sanya Richards, and propelling Harper to international renown.

Harper closed 2008 with a third-place performance at 2009 IAAF World Athletics Final.

== 2009 ==
The defending Olympic gold medalist won her first national title in the women's 100 m hurdles in 12.36. Though wind-aided, Harper posted the fourth fastest time ever by an American under any conditions. She recorded a personal best of 12.48 seconds in the semi-finals of the 100 m hurdles at the 2009 World Championships in Athletics in Berlin. In the final Harper clipped hurdle two throwing her off bringing her back to manage a seventh-place finish. She went on to 2009 IAAF World Athletics Final running 12.61 seconds for a silver medal. She finished the season ranked second in the world in the 100 m hurdles.

== 2010–2011 ==
=== Comeback ===
In 2010 Harper suffered a knee injury at hurdle practice which ended her season early. The career-threatening injury led to surgery and rehabilitation that occurred throughout the 2010 season until the beginning of the 2011 Outdoor season. With four months of training, Harper again made the US team placing third in the 100 meter hurdles at the USA Outdoor Championships. Getting back into championship form, she finished third in the 2011 IAAF World Championships in Daegu, South Korea, earning the bronze medal and a new personal best of (12.47).

== 2012 London Olympics ==
Harper started her 2012 season healthy for the first time since 2009. As she raced to prepare for the 2012 Olympics in London, Harper traveled to the West Indies to start her season with a victory at a rainy Guadalupe Meet. She then crossed the Atlantic to win both the Rome Diamond League 100 m hurdle showdown and the Colorful Daegu Pre Championship Meet in South Korea. Harper carried that great form on to Eugene, Oregon, to begin her quest for her second Olympic gold medal at the Olympic Trials. The reigning Olympic champion showed up as the favorite and did not disappoint. She kept her quest alive winning her first U.S. Olympic Trials in Oregon at Hayward Field in very soggy conditions.

In London, Harper showed great fitness advancing from the quarterfinals in 12.75, then a running a season's best and personal record 12.46 in the semifinals. In the Olympic final she made history running down the entire field lowering her personal best time and tying the Olympic record of 12.37; ironically it was .02 seconds short of the gold.

After the London Games, Harper continued the Diamond League tour finishing the second half of her season undefeated. First she won the Stockholm Galan Diamond League Meet. Next she traveled to Lausanne, Switzerland to post the second fastest time of her career, 12.43, at the Athletissima Diamond League Meet. Harper concluded the 2012 season winning the Diamond League Title in Weltklasse Zurich Diamond League Meet in a time of 12.59. Her Diamond League title granted her an automatic bye to the 2013 IAAF World Championship in Moscow Russia.

Harper was awarded All-Athletics.com Female Hurdler of the Year in North & Central America.

== 2013 ==
March 23, Dawn Harper became Dawn Harper-Nelson marrying her high school friend and middle school rival. She earned her first victory under the new name in the Jamaica Invitational with a world leading 12.63. Two weeks later, she travelled to Doha Qatar to run a blistering 12.60 improving her world leading time by 0.03 seconds. She ended her May competition in Manchester, England by winning the Great City Games Street Race then traveling to Rome, Italy, Harper-Nelson to capture her 4th total and 3rd consecutive Golden Gala Diamond League victory. Harper-Nelson's 2012 Diamond League Championship earned her an automatic spot on the USA World Championship team heading to Moscow, Russia. Because of that Diamond League championship in 2012, she only needed to run one round of the USATF National Championship in Des Moines, Iowa to show fitness. She won her first round of the women's 100 m hurdles in 12.60.

Harper-Nelson left Iowa for the Sainsbury's Grand Prix Diamond League in Birmingham, England, which she won in a time of 12.64. She celebrated Independence Day running a winning time of 12.53 in the Athletissima Diamond League in Lausanne, Switzerland. At the IAAF World Championships Harper-Nelson finished in a disappointing 4th place time of 12.59. This marked the first major International Championship where she had not received a medal since the 2008 Olympic Games in Beijing. Nelson regrouped and set out to finish her Diamond League tour first stopping in Croatia to beat a similar field to the Moscow World Championships featuring Sally Pearson. She put a stamp on her season and eased many minds when she went on to run a fast 12.48 at the Diamond League Final in Brussels, Belgium, winning her second Diamond League Title beating exactly the same field, excluding the champion, from the Moscow World Champs again.

== 2014 ==
Coming off of a bittersweet 2013 season, Harper-Nelson started her season with a new first running her first shuttle hurdle relay at the Drake Relays with the world's fastest time of 50.50sec. The Diamond League race was once again a huge hurdle, but winning Birmingham and running a World Lead 12.44 at Stade de Paris, brought the competition down to the wire at Zurich. Before the Diamond League final, Harper-Nelson defended her 2013 USATF National Championship in Sacramento in a winning time of 12.55. The Diamond League final at Zurich was headlined by Queen Harrison and Harper-Nelson. The IAAF report said it this way, "Dawn Harper Nelson produced an almost flawless race to fly over the 10 barriers and win the 100 m hurdles in 12.58 becoming the Diamond Race winner. She celebrated in effervescent fashion, and delighted the crowd on the first bend, by turning cartwheels on the track beyond the finish line. " Winning her 3rd consecutive Diamond Trophy, Harper-Nelson went to represent the Americas at the IAAF 2014 Continental Cup in Marrakech, Morocco. She won the Continental Cup with a Championship Record of 12.47. Harper-Nelson finished the 2014 season ranked as the No. 1 100 m hurdler in the World.

== 2015 ==
Coming off of a season ranked world #1, Harper-Nelson took that momentum to this World Championship year. Though she was the IAAF Diamond League winner, which grants one an automatic spot on the world team, she would not be given the bye as the previous World Champion from 2013 got the automatic bid, so she had to compete for place on the World Championship team at the USATF National Championship. Harper-Nelson prevailed in a stacked field of newcomers winning her 4th US Championship in a time of 12.55 seconds. Disappointment struck as Harper-Nelson crashed the 2nd hurdle tumbling out of the Semifinal. Harper-Nelson won her 4th Diamond League title at the IAAF Brussels Diamond League Final

== 2016 ==
Though she did not qualify for the 2016 Rio de Janeiro Olympics - missing the Olympic Trials final by .01 of a second - Harper-Nelson remained positive saying she was “grateful” for her career.

== 2017 ==
In February 2017, she was issued with a three-month ban backdated to December 2016 for an anti-doping rule violation after testing positive for hydrochlorothiazide. The United States Anti-Doping Agency (USADA) accepted her explanation that the source was medication she was prescribed by a physician to treat hypertension.

Harper-Nelson joined the Worlds team again in 2017. At the 2017 IAAF World Championships in London, She won silver in the 100 m hurdles against familiar rivals, finishing in 12.63. This was her second medal from an IAAF World Championships race. Though Australia's Sally Pearson won the gold medal, Harper-Nelson said “Me and Sally have just battled it out for years and it's been so great to be here with her. At the end, I could see Sally had won and I thought 'it's me and Sally again'.

== Post-athletics career ==
Harper-Nelson has since become a track and field analyst and host across various sporting events, such as the 2024 Paris Olympics.

== Personal life ==
Harper is the daughter of Henry and Linda Harper and has one sister, Keya, and three brothers, Bryton, Shivani, and Shiven. She attended UCLA and graduated with a Bachelor of Science in psychology in 2006. After winning gold in the Beijing Olympics, Governor Rod Blagojevich of Illinois declared October 6 as Dawn Harper Day honoring her for her victory and humble beginnings being from East St. Louis, Illinois. Her hometown of East St. Louis hosted a parade and public gathering in her honor on that same day.

In June 2012, Harper was named a spokeswoman for the American Diabetes Association and The FootMate® System by Gordon Brush. Harper's passion for diabetes prevention stems from a long line of family members that have been diagnosed with the disease and an uncle whom she had just lost to the disease in 2011. Following her silver medal in the London Olympics, Harper-Nelson was named the new Ambassador for United Way of Greater St. Louis Education Express. Through Education Express, she promotes the importance of education and mentoring in the St. Louis region. Harper-Nelson loves speaking to children about their dreams and the importance of education.

On March 23, 2013, Harper married longtime friend Alonzo Nelson. The couple had known each other since meeting on the track in eighth grade. Alonzo was the one boy hurdler she couldn't beat. Before the wedding, Harper appeared on TLC's Say Yes to the Dress (season 10 episode 9: Race to the Altar) where she went to Kleinfelds in Brooklyn to find her dress. She is now using the name Dawn Harper-Nelson professionally.
