= Brigitte Foster-Hylton =

Jamaican hurdler (born 1974)

Brigitte Foster-Hylton OD
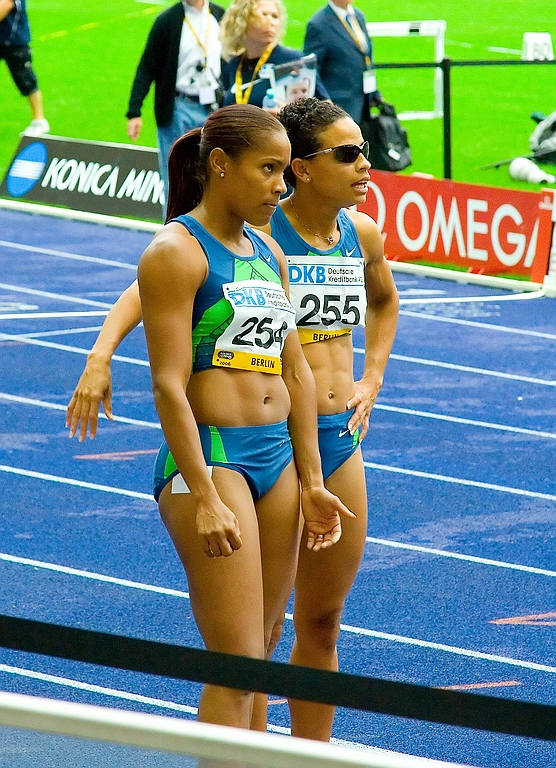
- Foster-Hylton (at left) in 2006

Personal information
- Nationality: Jamaica
- Born: 7 November 1974 (age 51) Saint Elizabeth, Jamaica

Sport
- Sport: Running
- Event: 100 m hurdles
Medal record
Representing Jamaica
Women's athletics
World Championships
Gold medal – first place	2009 Berlin	100 m hurdles
Silver medal – second place	2003 Paris	100 m hurdles
Bronze medal – third place	2005 Helsinki	100 m hurdles
Commonwealth Games
Gold medal – first place	2006 Melbourne	100 m hurdles
Pan American Games
Gold medal – first place	2003 San Domingo	100 m hurdles
Continental Cup
Silver medal – second place	2002 Madrid	100 m hurdles

Brigitte Ann Foster-Hylton, née Brigitte Ann Foster, (born 7 November 1974 in Saint Elizabeth, Jamaica) is a Jamaican 100 m hurdler. She was the World Champion over 100 m hurdles in 2009.

Foster competed for the Texas State Bobcats track and field team in the NCAA.

Like fellow Jamaican hurdler Delloreen Ennis-London she was not a successful hurdler until 2000, when she lowered her personal best by 65/100. Having improved greatly, she finished eighth at the 2000 Olympics. At Athens 2004 she pulled out of the semi-finals.

Foster-Hylton won the silver medal at the 2003 World Championships and the bronze medal at the 2005 World Championships.

At the 2008 Olympics in Beijing Foster-Hylton finished sixth in the final, but was only two-hundredths of a second behind the silver medallist.

Foster-Hylton's greatest achievement came in 2009 when she became World Champion at 100 metres hurdles at the World Championships in Berlin. She had previously won the 100 metres hurdles titles at both the Pan American Games (in 2003) and the Commonwealth Games (in 2006).

She has been married to Patrick Hylton, the group managing director of National Commercial Bank Jamaica, since 2005.

== Personal bests ==
- 100 metres : 11.17 (2003)
- 100 metres hurdles : 12.45 (2003)

== International competitions ==
Year	Competition	Venue	Position	Event	Notes
1999	Central American and Caribbean Championships	Bridgetown, Barbados	2nd	100 m hurdles	
2000	Olympic Games	Sydney, Australia	8th	100 m hurdles	
2001	World Championships	Edmonton, Canada	semi-finals	100 m hurdles	
2002	IAAF World Cup	Madrid, Spain	2nd	100 m hurdles	
2003	World Championships	Paris, France	2nd	100 m hurdles	
2003	Pan American Games	Santo Domingo, Dominican Republic	1st	100 m hurdles	
2004	Olympic Games	Athens, Greece	semi-finals	100 m hurdles	
2005	World Championships	Helsinki, Finland	3rd	100 m hurdles	
2006	Commonwealth Games	Melbourne, Australia	1st	100 m hurdles	
2008	Olympic Games	Beijing, China	6th	100 m hurdles	
2009	World Championships	Berlin, Germany	1st	100 m hurdles	
2011	World Championships	Daegu, South Korea	semi-finals	100 m hurdles	
2012	Olympic Games	London, United Kingdom	heats	100 m hurdles	

== Circuit finals ==
Year	Competition	Venue	Position	Event	Notes
2002	IAAF Grand Prix Final	Paris, France	2nd	100 m hurdles	
2009	IAAF World Athletics Final	Thessaloniki, Greece	1st	100 m hurdles	

== Personal life ==
Foster- Hylton is married to Jamaican banker, the group managing director of National Commercial Bank Jamaica Patrick Hylton. In 2016 she gave birth to a son.

Sporting positions
Preceded by (United States) Gail Devers	Women's 100 m Hurdles Best Year Performance; 2003	Succeeded by (United States) Joanna Hayes
