= Delloreen Ennis-London =

Jamaican hurdler (born 1975)

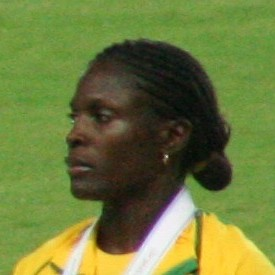
- Ennis-London in 2007

Personal information
- Born: 5 March 1975 (age 51) Saint Catherine Parish, Jamaica

Sport
- Sport: Track and field
Medal record
Women's athletics
Representing Jamaica
World Championships
Silver medal – second place	2005 Helsinki	100 m hurdles
Bronze medal – third place	2007 Osaka	100 m hurdles
Bronze medal – third place	2009 Berlin	100 m hurdles
Commonwealth Games
Bronze medal – third place	2006 Melbourne	100 m hurdles
Pan American Games
Gold medal – first place	2007 Rio	100 m hurdles
CAC Championships
Gold medal – first place	2003 St George's	100m hurdles
CAC Junior Championships (U20)
Silver medal – second place	1994 Port of Spain	100 m hurdles
CARIFTA Games Junior (U20)
Gold medal – first place	1994 Bridgetown	100 m hurdles
Gold medal – first place	1992 Nassau	100 m hurdles

Delloreen Alverna Ennis-London, née Ennis, (5 March 1975) is a Jamaican hurdling athlete who won the silver medal in the 100 metre hurdles at the 2005 World Championships.

== Career ==
She broke onto the world scene in 1999 when she improved her best by more than half a second. Achieving the result of 12.52 in 2000, she finished fourth at the 2000 Olympics. In Athens 2004, however, she only reached the semi-final. She did not beat her own personal best until April 2004 in Denton, Texas, when she lowered it by 1/100 second.

She won the 100 m hurdles at the 2009 national championships, giving her the opportunity to compete at the 2009 World Championships in Athletics in Berlin that year where she won another bronze medal.

Delloreen is coached by Remi Korchemny.

== Personal bests ==
- 100 metres : 11.77 (2005)
- 100 metres hurdles : 12.50 (2007)

== Achievements ==
Year	Competition	Venue	Position	Event	Notes
Representing Jamaica
1992	CARIFTA Games (U-20)	Nassau, Bahamas	1st	100 m hurdles	13.92
1992	World Junior Championships	Seoul, South Korea	11th (sf)	100 m hurdles	13.81 (wind: +0.3 m/s)
1994	CARIFTA Games (U-20)	Bridgetown, Barbados	1st	100 m hurdles	14.53
1994	Central American and Caribbean Junior Championships (U-20)	Port of Spain, Trinidad and Tobago	2nd	100 m hurdles	14.0 (-1.0 m/s)
1999	World Championships	Seville, Spain	7th	100 m hurdles	12.87 (0.7 m/s)
2000	IAAF Grand Prix Final	Doha, UAE	3rd	100 m hurdles	12.96 (1.2 m/s)
2003	Central American and Caribbean Championships	St. George's, Grenada	1st	100 m hurdles	12.70 CR
2004	Olympic Games	Athens, Greece	5th (sf)	100 m hurdles	12.60 (1.7 m/s)
2005	World Championships	Helsinki, Finland	2nd	100 m hurdles	12.76 (-2.0 m/s)
2006	Commonwealth Games	Melbourne, Australia	3rd	100 m hurdles	13.00 (-0.3 m/s)
2007	Pan American Games	Rio de Janeiro, Brazil	1st	100 m hurdles	12.65 (0.0 m/s) GR PB
2007	World Championships	Osaka, Japan	3rd	100 m hurdles	12.50 (-0.1 m/s)
2008	Olympic Games	Beijing, China	5th	100 m hurdles	12.65 (0.1 m/s)
2009	World Championships	Berlin, Germany	3rd	100 m hurdles	12.55 (0.2 m/s)
2009	IAAF World Athletics Final	Thessaloniki, Greece	3rd	100 m hurdles	12.61 (-0.1 m/s)
