= Australia at the World Athletics Championships =

- WA code: AUS
- National federation: Athletics Australia
- Website: www.athletics.com.au
- Medals Ranked 13th: Gold 15 Silver 16 Bronze 14 Total 45

World Athletics Championships appearances (overview)
- 1976; 1980; 1983; 1987; 1991; 1993; 1995; 1997; 1999; 2001; 2003; 2005; 2007; 2009; 2011; 2013; 2015; 2017; 2019; 2022; 2023; 2025

Australia has participated in every edition of the World Athletics Championships since the inaugural event in 1983. Australia is 13th on the all time medal table.

Australia has won 15 gold medals, with 10 individual winners, and 45 medals total. Cathy Freeman, Jana Pittman, Kelsey-Lee Barber and Sally Pearson are Australia's only multiple gold medal winners, with two each; Freeman (bronze) and Pearson (silver) have also each won a place medal. Other multiple medalists are: Dmitri Markov (one gold, one silver), Jared Tallent (three silvers), Kerry Saxby-Junna (one silver, one bronze) and Mitchell Watt (one silver, one bronze). Australia's first World Championships medal was when Robert de Castella won gold in the Men's marathon at the inaugural World Championships in 1983.

== Medalists ==
Medal	Name	Year	Event
Gold	Robert De Castella	1983 Helsinki	Men's marathon
Silver	Debbie Flintoff-King	1987 Rome	Women's 400 metres hurdles
Silver	Kerry Saxby-Junna	1987 Rome	Women's 10km walk
Silver	Daniela Costian	1993 Stuttgart	Women's discus throw
Silver	Steve Brimacombe, Paul Henderson, Tim Jackson, Damien Marsh	1995 Göteborg	Men's 4 × 100 metres relay
Bronze	Cathy Freeman, Melinda Gainsford-Taylor, Lee Naylor, Renee Poetschka	1995 Göteborg	Women's 4 × 400 metres relay
Bronze	Tim Forsyth	1997 Athens	Men's high jump
Bronze	Steve Moneghetti	1997 Athens	Men's marathon
Gold	Cathy Freeman	1997 Athens	Women's 400 metres
Silver	Joanna Stone-Nixon	1997 Athens	Women's javelin throw
Silver	Dmitri Markov	1999 Seville	Men's pole vault
Gold	Cathy Freeman	1999 Seville	Women's 400 metres
Bronze	Tatiana Grigorieva	1999 Seville	Women's pole vault
Bronze	Kerry Saxby-Junna	1999 Seville	Women's 20 kilometres walk
Gold	Dmitri Markov	2001 Edmonton	Men's pole vault
Bronze	Adam Basil, Steve Brimacombe, Paul Di Bella, Matt Shirvington	2001 Edmonton	Men's 4 × 100 metres relay
Bronze	Bronwyn Eagles	2001 Edmonton	Women's hammer throw
Gold	Jana Pittman	2003 Paris	Women's 400 metres hurdles
Bronze	Craig Mottram	2005 Helsinki	Men's 5000 metres
Gold	Nathan Deakes	2007 Osaka	Men's 50 kilometres walk
Gold	Jana Pittman	2007 Osaka	Women's 400 metres hurdles
Gold	Steve Hooker	2009 Berlin	Men's pole vault
Bronze	Mitchell Watt	2009 Berlin	Men's long jump
Bronze	Joel Milburn (Heat Only), Ben Offereins, John Steffenson, Tristan Thomas, Sean Wroe	2009 Berlin	Men's 4 × 400 metres relay
Gold	Dani Samuels	2009 Berlin	Women's discus throw
Silver	Jared Tallent	2011 Daegu	Men's 50 kilometres walk
Silver	Mitchell Watt	2011 Daegu	Men's long jump
Gold	Sally Pearson	2011 Daegu	Women's 100 metres hurdles
Silver	Jared Tallent	2013 Moscow	Men's 50 kilometres walk
Silver	Kimberley Mickle	2013 Moscow	Women's javelin throw
Silver	Sally Pearson	2013 Moscow	Women's 100 metres hurdles
Silver	Jared Tallent	2015 Beijing	Men's 50 kilometres walk
Silver	Fabrice Lapierre	2015 Beijing	Men's long jump
Gold	Sally Pearson	2017 London	Women's 100 metres hurdles
Silver	Dani Stevens	2017 London	Women's discus throw
Gold	Kelsey-Lee Barber	2019 Doha	Women's javelin throw
Bronze	Nina Kennedy	2022 Oregon	Women's pole vault
Gold	Eleanor Patterson	2022 Oregon	Women's high jump
Gold	Kelsey-Lee Barber	2022 Oregon	Women's javelin throw
Gold	Nina Kennedy	2023 Budapest	Women's pole vault
Silver	Jemima Montag	2023 Budapest	Women's 20 kilometres walk
Silver	Eleanor Patterson	2023 Budapest	Women's high jump
Bronze	Mackenzie Little	2023 Budapest	Women's javelin throw
Bronze	Kurtis Marschall	2023 Budapest	Men's pole vault
Bronze	Nicola Olyslagers	2023 Budapest	Women's high jump

== Medal tables ==
=== By championships ===
Year	Gold	Silver	Bronze	Total
2009 Berlin	2	0	2	4
2022 Oregon	2	0	1	3
2007 Osaka	2	0	0	2
2023 Budapest	1	2	3	6
2011 Daegu	1	2	0	3
1997 Athens	1	1	2	4
1999 Seville	1	1	2	4
2017 London	1	1	0	2
2025 Tokyo	1	0	3	4
2001 Edmonton	1	0	2	3
1983 Helsinki	1	0	0	1
2003 Saint-Denis	1	0	0	1
2019 Doha	1	0	0	1
2013 Moscow	0	3	0	3
1987 Rome	0	2	0	2
2015 Beijing	0	2	0	2
1995 Gothenburg	0	1	1	2
1993 Stuttgart	0	1	0	1
2005 Helsinki	0	0	1	1
1991 Tokyo	0	0	0	0
Totals (20 entries)	16	16	17	49

=== By gender ===
Gender	Gold	Silver	Bronze	Total
Women	12	9	9	30
Men	4	7	8	19

== Doping disqualifications ==
Athlete	Sex	Event	Year(s)	Result	Notes
Joshua Ross	Men	200 m 4 × 100 m relay	2013	7th (h)	Australian relay team disqualified

== See also ==
- Australia at the Olympics
- Australia at the Commonwealth Games
- Australia at the Summer Universiade
