= Australia at the 2011 World Championships in Athletics =

- WA code: AUS
- National federation: Athletics Australia
- Website: www.athletics.com.au

in Daegu
- Competitors: 41
- Medals Ranked 9th: Gold 1 Silver 2 Bronze 0 Total 3

World Championships in Athletics appearances (overview)
- 1976; 1980; 1983; 1987; 1991; 1993; 1995; 1997; 1999; 2001; 2003; 2005; 2007; 2009; 2011; 2013; 2015; 2017; 2019; 2022; 2023; 2025

Australia competed at the 2011 World Championships in Athletics from 27 August to 4 September in Daegu, South Korea.

== Team selection ==
An initial Australian Flame team of 24 has been announced by Athletics Australia, with reigning World champions Steve Hooker and Dani Samuels set to lead the green and gold charge at the competition. Athletes looking to qualify but not yet announced are eligible for selection until 31 July 2011 (excluding marathon and walks). A final team of 47 athletes was announced on 2 August 2011.

The following athletes appeared on the preliminary Entry List, but not on the Official Start List of the specific event, resulting in a total number of 41 competitors:

KEY:	Did not participate	Competed in another event

	Event	Athlete
Men	400 metres	Sean Wroe
Men	800 metres	Jeffrey Riseley
Men	10,000 metres	Ben St Lawrence
Men	4 × 100 metres relay	Liam Gander
Men	4 × 100 metres relay	Mitchell Watt
Men	4 × 400 metres relay	John Steffensen
Men	20 kilometres walk	Luke Adams
Women	100 metres	Sally Pearson
Women	4 x 100 metres relay	Laura Whaler
Women	4 × 400 metres relay	Tamsyn Manou
Women	4 × 400 metres relay	Hayley Butler
Women	4 × 400 metres relay	Sally Pearson

In addition, the team includes 2 athletes invited by the IPC for exhibition events: Richard Colman, 400m T53 (wheelchair) men, and Madison de Rozario, 800m T54 (wheelchair) women.

== Medalists ==
The following Australian competitors won medals at the Championships

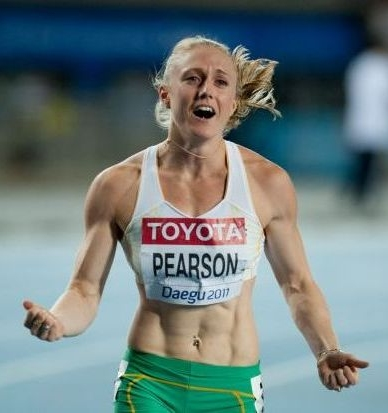
Sally Pearson won a gold medal in the Women's 100 metres hurdles competition at this year's championships

Medal	Athlete	Event
Gold	Sally Pearson	100 m hurdles
Silver	Mitchell Watt	Long jump
Silver	Jared Tallent	50 kilometres walk

== Results ==
=== Men ===
Athlete	Event	Preliminaries		Heats		Semifinals		Final	
Athlete	Event	Time Width Height	Rank	Time Width Height	Rank	Time Width Height	Rank	Time Width Height	Rank
Ryan Gregson	1500 metres			3:40.01	9 q	3:47.89	20	Did not advance	
Jeffrey Riseley	1500 metres			3:42.22	28	Did not advance			
Collis Birmingham	5000 metres			13:47.88	19			Did not advance	
Craig Mottram	5000 metres			13:56.60	26			Did not advance	
Ben St Lawrence	5000 metres			13:51.64	23			Did not advance	
Jeff Hunt	Marathon							Did not finish	
Youcef Abdi	3000 metres steeplechase			8:38.42	28			Did not advance	
Anthony Alozie; Matt Davies; Aaron Rouge-Serret; Isaac Ntiamoah	4 × 100 metres relay			38.69 SB	10			Did not advance	
Ben Offereins; Tristan Thomas; Steven Solomon; Sean Wroe	4 × 400 metres relay			3:01.56 SB	10			Did not advance	
Jared Tallent	20 kilometres walk							1:25:25	27
Adam Rutter	20 kilometres walk							DNF	
Jared Tallent	50 kilometres walk							3:43:36 SB	2nd place, silver medalist(s)
Luke Adams	50 kilometres walk							3:45:41 SB	5
Nathan Deakes	50 kilometres walk							DNF	
Mitchell Watt	Long jump	8.15	2 Q					8.33	2nd place, silver medalist(s)
Fabrice Lapierre	Long jump	7.89	21					Did not advance	
Robert Crowther	Long jump	7.74	24					Did not advance	
Henry Frayne	Triple jump	16.83	11 q					16.78	9
Steve Hooker	Pole vault	NM						did not advance	
Benn Harradine	Discus throw	63.49	10 q					64.77	5
Jarrod Bannister	Javelin throw	81.35	11 q					82.25 SB	7

=== Women ===
Two years after finishing only 5th although being the top favourite at the 12th IAAF World Championships in Berlin, Sally Pearson won the gold medal in the 100 m hurdles event with the world's fourth fastest time of 12.28s, a new Oceania Area record.

Athlete	Event	Preliminaries		Heats		Semifinals		Final	
Athlete	Event	Time Width Height	Rank	Time Width Height	Rank	Time Width Height	Rank	Time Width Height	Rank
Kaila McKnight	1500 metres			4:08.74	9 q	4:10.83	19	Did not advance	
Eloise Wellings	10,000 metres							DNS	
Sally Pearson	100 m hurdles			12.53	1 Q	12.36 WL, AR	1 Q	12.28 CR, AR, WL	1st place, gold medalist(s)
Lauren Boden	400 m hurdles			55.78 SB	12 Q	55.29	20	Did not advance	
Hayley Butler; Melissa Breen; Charlotte van Veenendaal; Sally Pearson	4 × 100 metres relay			43.79	11			Did not advance	
Caitlin Sargent; Caitlin Willis-Pincott; Lauren Boden; Anneliese Rubie	4 × 400 metres relay			3:32.27 SB	16			Did not advance	
Regan Lamble	20 kilometres walk							1:33:38	15
Claire Tallent	20 kilometres walk							1:34:46	21
Alana Boyd	Pole vault	4.50	13					Did not advance	
Dani Samuels	Discus throw	60.05	11 q					59.14	10
Kim Mickle	Javelin throw	60.50	8 q					61.96	6
