= Australia at the 2009 World Championships in Athletics =

- WA code: AUS

in Berlin
- Competitors: 38 (26 men, 12 women)
- Medals Ranked 11th: Gold 2 Silver 0 Bronze 2 Total 4

World Championships in Athletics appearances (overview)
- 1976; 1980; 1983; 1987; 1991; 1993; 1995; 1997; 1999; 2001; 2003; 2005; 2007; 2009; 2011; 2013; 2015; 2017; 2019; 2022; 2023; 2025

Australia won a total of four medals at the 2009 World Championships in Athletics held in Berlin.

== Medalists ==
The following Australian competitors won medals at the Championships:

Medal	Name	Event	Date	Ref
Gold	Steven Hooker	Pole Vault	22 August	
Gold	Dani Samuels	Discus Throw	21 August	
Bronze	Mitchell Watt	Long Jump	22 August	
Bronze	John Steffensen, Ben Offereins, Tristan Thomas, Sean Wroe	4 x 400 m relay	23 August	

== Team selection ==
Track and road events

Event	Athletes	
Event	Men	Women
100 metres		Melissa Breen
400 metres	John Steffensen; Sean Wroe; Joel Milburn	Tamsyn Lewis
800 metres		Madeleine Pape
1500 metres	Ryan Gregson; Jeffrey Riseley; Jeremy Roff	
5000 metres	Collis Birmingham	
10000 metres	Collis Birmingham; David McNeill	
100 metre hurdles		Sally McLellan
400 metre hurdles	Tristan Thomas; Brendan Cole	Tamsyn Lewis
3000 m steeplechase	Youcef Abdi	Donna MacFarlane
4 x 100 metres relay	TBA	
4 x 400 metres relay	John Steffensen, Ben Offereins, Tristan Thomas, Sean Wroe Bronze	TBA
20 km race walk	Luke Adams; Adam Rutter; Jared Tallent	Jess Rothwell; Cheryl Webb; Claire Tallent
50 km race walk	Luke Adams; Chris Erickson; Jared Tallent	
Marathon	Martin Dent; Andrew Letherby; Mark Tucker; Scott Westcott	Lisa Jane Weightman

Field and combined events

Event	Athletes	
Event	Men	Women
High jump		Petrina Price
Triple jump	Alwyn Jones	
Pole vault	Steven Hooker Gold	
Long jump	Fabrice Lapierre; Mitchell Watt Bronze	
Javelin throw		Kimberley Mickle
Shot Put	Justin Anlezark; Scott Martin	
Discus throw	Benn Harradine	Dani Samuels Gold
