= Australia at the 2025 World Athletics Championships =

- Flag of Australia
- WA code: AUS

in Tokyo, Japan 13 September 2025 – 21 September 2025
- Competitors: 88 (41 men and 47 women)
- Medals Ranked 15th: Gold 1 Silver 0 Bronze 3 Total 4

World Athletics Championships appearances (overview)
- 1976; 1980; 1983; 1987; 1991; 1993; 1995; 1997; 1999; 2001; 2003; 2005; 2007; 2009; 2011; 2013; 2015; 2017; 2019; 2022; 2023; 2025

Australia competed at the 2025 World Athletics Championships in Tokyo, Japan, from 13 to 21 September 2025.

== Medallists ==
Medal	Athlete	Event	Date
Gold	Nicola Olyslagers	Women's high jump	September 21
Bronze	Kurtis Marschall	Men's pole vault	September 15
Bronze	Jessica Hull	Women's 1500 metres	September 16
Bronze	Mackenzie Little	Women's javelin throw	September 20

== Results ==
Australia entered 88 athletes to the championships.

Key

- Q = Qualified for the next round
- q = Qualified for the next round as a fastest loser or, in field events, by position without achieving the qualifying target
- NR = National record
- PB = Personal best
- SB = Season best
- N/A = Round not applicable for the event

=== Men ===
Track and road events

Athlete	Event	Heat		Semifinal		Final	
Athlete	Event	Result	Rank	Result	Rank	Result	Rank
Joshua Azzopardi	100 metres	10.41	6	Did not advance			
Rohan Browning	100 metres	10.16	5	Did not advance			
Gout Gout	200 metres	20.23	3 Q	20.36	4	Did not advance	
Calab Law	200 metres	20.91	8	Did not advance			
Aidan Murphy	200 metres	20.54	6	Did not advance			
Reece Holder	400 metres	44.54 =SB	2 Q	44.63	3	Did not advance	
Cooper Sherman	400 metres	45.53	7	Did not advance			
Peter Bol	800 metres	1:45.15	4	Did not advance			
Luke Boyes	800 metres	1:45.54	6	Did not advance			
Peyton Craig	800 metres	1:45.44	4	Did not advance			
Cameron Myers	1500 metres	3:42.75	8	Did not advance			
Adam Spencer	1500 metres	3:42.17	10	Did not advance			
Jude Thomas	1500 metres	3:38.19	11	Did not advance			
Seth O’Donnell	5000 metres	13:34.52	18	—N/a		Did not advance	
Jack Rayner	5000 metres	13:49.46	16	—N/a		Did not advance	
Ky Robinson	5000 metres	13:13.60	5 Q	—N/a		12:59.95	4
Liam Boudin	Marathon	—N/a				2:24:39	57
Tim Vincent	Marathon	—N/a				2:20:12 SB	44
Ed Trippas	3000 metres steeplechase	8:46.51	12	—N/a		Did not advance	
Joshua Azzopardi*; Connor Bond; Rohan Browning; Jacob Despard; Calab Law	4 × 100 metres relay	38.21	4 q	—N/a		DNF	
Reece Holder; Aidan Murphy; Thomas Reynolds; Cooper Sherman	4 × 400 metres relay	DQ		—N/a		Did not advance	
Rhydian Cowley	20 kilometres walk	—N/a				1:21:18	20
Tim Fraser	20 kilometres walk	—N/a				1:24:55	39
Declan Tingay	20 kilometres walk	—N/a				1:21:30	23
Mitchell Baker	35 kilometres walk	—N/a				2:51:11 SB	32
Rhydian Cowley	35 kilometres walk	—N/a				2:33:28	11
Will Thompson	35 kilometres walk	—N/a				2:40:19 SB	25

Field events

Athlete	Event	Qualification		Final	
Athlete	Event	Distance	Position	Distance	Position
Roman Anastasios	High jump	2.16	33	Did not advance	
Yual Reath	High jump	2.25 SB	5 q	2.20	11
Brandon Starc	High jump	2.16	29	Did not advance	
Kurtis Marschall	Pole vault	5.75	5 q	5.95 PB	3rd place, bronze medalist(s)
Liam Adcock	Long jump	7.94	14	Did not advance	
Christopher Mitrevski	Long jump	7.83	21	Did not advance	
Connor Murphy	Triple jump	16.58	18	Did not advance	
Matthew Denny	Discus throw	66.63	4 Q	65.57	4
Cameron McEntyre	Javelin throw	83.03 PB	11 q	75.65	12

=== Women ===
Track and road events

Athlete	Event	Heat		Semifinal		Final	
Athlete	Event	Result	Rank	Result	Rank	Result	Rank
Ella Connolly	100 metres	11.43	7	Did not advance			
Torrie Lewis	100 metres	11.08 NR	3 Q	11.14	=14	Did not advance	
Bree Rizzo	100 metres	11.45	6	Did not advance			
Kristie Edwards	200 metres	23.39	6	Did not advance			
Mia Gross	200 metres	23.24	6	Did not advance			
Torrie Lewis	200 metres	22.56 PB	2 Q	22.69	4	Did not advance	
Ellie Beer	400 metres	52.31	8	Did not advance			
Abbey Caldwell	800 metres	1:58.71	4 q	1:58.44	5	Did not advance	
Claudia Hollingsworth	800 metres	1:59.06	3 Q	1:59.50	4	Did not advance	
Jessica Hull	800 metres	2:13.42	7 qR	1:57.15 AR	3 q	1:57.30	8
Sarah Billings	1500 metres	4:06.22	9	Did not advance			
Linden Hall	1500 metres	4:07.61	4 Q	4:01.65	7	Did not advance	
Jessica Hull	1500 metres	4:04.40	1 Q	4:06.87	2 Q	3:55.16	3rd place, bronze medalist(s)
Rose Davies	5000 metres	14:56.83	3 Q	—N/a		15:03.61	10
Georgia Griffith	5000 metres	15:33.15	17	—N/a		Did not advance	
Linden Hall	5000 metres	14:57.80	7 Q	—N/a		15:04.03	11
Isobel Batt-Doyle	10,000 metres	—N/a				31:53.41	17
Lauren Ryan	10,000 metres	—N/a				31:27.78	9
Sarah Klein	Marathon	—N/a				2:41:46 SB	42
Tara Palm	Marathon	—N/a				2:44:51	48
Vanessa Wilson	Marathon	—N/a				2:39:17 SB	38
Liz Clay	100 metres hurdles	13.82	8	Did not advance			
Sarah Carli	400 metres hurdles	55.24	5 q	55.02	7	Did not adcance	
Alanah Yukich	400 metres hurdles	56.68	8	Did not advance			
Amy Cashin	3000 metres steeplechase	9:50.53	11	—N/a		Did not advance	
Cara Feain-Ryan	3000 metres steeplechase	9:42.62	10	—N/a		Did not advance	
Ella Connolly; Kristie Edwards; Torrie Lewis; Bree Rizzo	4 × 100 metres relay	Did not finish		—N/a		Did not advance	
Ellie Beer; Carla Bull; Mia Gross; Jemma Pollard	4 × 400 metres relay	3:25.43 SB	7	—N/a		Did not advance	
Alexandra Griffin	20 kilometres walk	—N/a				Did not finish	
Rebecca Henderson	20 kilometres walk	—N/a				1:31:05	21
Elizabeth McMillen	20 kilometres walk	—N/a				1:34:58	33
Rebecca Henderson	35 kilometres walk	—N/a				2:50:03	9
Allanah Pitcher	35 kilometres walk	—N/a				3:00:08	19
Olivia Sandery	35 kilometres walk	—N/a				2:51:43	14

Field events

Athlete	Event	Qualification		Final	
Athlete	Event	Distance	Position	Distance	Position
Nicola Olyslagers	High jump	1.92	= 1 q	2.00	1st place, gold medalist(s)
Eleanor Patterson	High jump	1.92	= 1 q	1.97	5
Emily Whelan	High jump	1.88	24	Did not advance	
Delta Amidzovski	Long jump	6.28	27	Did not advance	
Samantha Dale	Long jump	6.18	31	Did not advance	
Desleigh Owusu	Triple jump	13.58	27	Did not advance	
Taryn Gollshewsky	Discus throw	55.40	34	Did not advance	
Lianna Davidson	Javelin throw	57.44	23	Did not advance	
Mackenzie Little	Javelin throw	65.54	2 Q	63.58	3rd place, bronze medalist(s)
Stephanie Ratcliffe	Hammer throw	68.42	23	Did not advance	
Lara Roberts	Hammer throw	68.55	22	Did not advance	

Combined events – Heptathlon

Athlete	Event	100H	HJ	SP	200 m	LJ	JT	800 m	Final	Rank
Camryn Newton-Smith	Result	13.55	1.74 m	13.05 m	24.98	5.90 m	44.34 m	2:22.54	5925	16
Camryn Newton-Smith	Points	1043	903	731	889	819	751	789	5925	16
Tori West	Result	13.81	1.71 m	13.21 m	24.36	5.64 m	44.31 m	2:27.24	5778	17
Tori West	Points	1005	867	741	946	741	750	728	5778	17

=== Mixed ===
Athlete	Event	Heat		Final	
Athlete	Event	Result	Rank	Result	Rank
Carla Bull (W); Mia Gross(W); Thomas Reynolds (M); Luke van Ratingen (M)	4 × 400 metres relay	3:13.46	5	Did not advance	
