= Australia at the 2022 World Athletics Championships =

- Flag of Australia
- WA code: AUS
- National federation: Athletics Australia

in Eugene, United States 15–24 July 2022
- Competitors: 65 (32 men and 33 women)
- Medals Ranked 5th: Gold 2 Silver 0 Bronze 1 Total 3

World Athletics Championships appearances (overview)
- 1976; 1980; 1983; 1987; 1991; 1993; 1995; 1997; 1999; 2001; 2003; 2005; 2007; 2009; 2011; 2013; 2015; 2017; 2019; 2022; 2023; 2025

Australia competed at the 2022 World Athletics Championships in Eugene, United States, from 15 to 24 July 2022. Australia entered 65 athletes.

== Medalists ==
Medal	Athlete	Event	Date
Gold	Eleanor Patterson	Women's high jump	19 July
Gold	Kelsey-Lee Barber	Women's javelin throw	22 July
Bronze	Nina Kennedy	Women's pole vault	17 July

== Entrants ==
- including alternates

Some athletes were selected for winning the 2022 Oceania Athletics Championships when they did not have the entry or the ranking standard.

=== Men ===
Track and road events

Athlete	Event	Preliminary		Heat		Semi-final		Final	
Athlete	Event	Result	Rank	Result	Rank	Result	Rank	Result	Rank
Rohan Browning	100 metres	N/A		10.22	5 (35)	did not advance			
Jake Doran	100 metres	N/A		10.29	6 (41)	did not advance			
Calab Law	200 metres	—N/a		20.50 PB	3 (23) Q	20.72	7 (21)	did not advance	
Aidan Murphy	200 metres	—N/a		20.75	6 (36)	did not advance			
Alex Beck	400 metres	—N/a		45.99	5 (21) q	46.21	8 (23)	did not advance	
Steven Solomon	400 metres	—N/a		46.87	6 (36)	did not advance			
Peter Bol	800 metres	—N/a		1:45.50	1 (9) Q	1:45.58	3 (8) q	1:45.51	7
Joseph Deng	800 metres	—N/a		did not start					
Oliver Hoare	1500 metres	—N/a		3:36.17	1 (8) Q	3:38.36	10 (18)	did not advance	
Stewart McSweyn	1500 metres	—N/a		3:34.91 SB	1 (1) Q	3:35.07	5 (5) Q	3:33.24 SB	9
Matthew Ramsden	1500 metres	—N/a		3:39.83	9 (32)	did not advance			
Matthew Ramsden	5000 metres	—N/a		13:52.90	16 (35)	—N/a		did not advance	
Jack Rayner	5000 metres	—N/a		did not start					
Ky Robinson	5000 metres	—N/a		13:27.03	8 (19)	—N/a		did not advance	
Jack Rayner	10,000 metres	—N/a						28:24.12	19
Chris Douglas	110 metres hurdles	—N/a		13.95	8 (36)	did not advance			
Nicholas Hough	110 metres hurdles	—N/a		13.51	5 (18) q	13.42	7 (15)	did not advance	
Ben Buckingham	3000 metres steeplechase	—N/a		8:29.15	9 (27)	—N/a		did not advance	
Edward Trippas	3000 metres steeplechase	—N/a		8:23.83	6 (20)	—N/a		did not advance	
Rhydian Cowley	20 kilometres walk	—N/a						1:23:37	19
Kyle Swan	20 kilometres walk	—N/a						1:28:43	33
Declan Tingay	20 kilometres walk	—N/a						1:23:28	17
Rhydian Cowley	35 kilometres walk	—N/a						2:30:34 AR	18
Carl Gibbons	35 kilometres walk	—N/a						DNF	

Field events

Athlete	Event	Qualification		Final	
Athlete	Event	Distance	Position	Distance	Position
Joel Baden	High jump	2.28 SB	4 (9) q	2.27	10
Yual Reath	High jump	2.17	12 (26)	did not advance	
Brandon Starc	High jump	did not start			
Kurtis Marschall	Pole vault	5.50	14 (24)	did not advance	
Henry Frayne	Long jump	7.99	6 (8) q	7.80	12
Christopher Mitrevski	Long jump	7.83	8 (16)	did not advance	
Matthew Denny	Discus throw	66.98	4 (4) Q	66.47	6
Cruz Hogan	Javelin throw	73.03	13 (26)	did not advance	
Cameron McEntyre	Javelin throw	77.50	11 (21)	did not advance	

Combined events – Decathlon

Athlete	Event	100 m	LJ	SP	HJ	400 m	110H	DT	PV	JT	1500 m	Final	Rank
Cedric Dubler	Result	10.93	7.56 SB	12.87	2.08	47.71	14.28	42.88	5.10 SB	54.76	4:37.26 SB	8246	8
Cedric Dubler	Points	876 (11)	950 (4)	659 (21)	878 (5)	923 (5)	939 (9)	723 (13)	941 (4)	659 (15)	698 (6)	8246	8
Daniel Golubovic	Result	10.99	6.96 SB	15.00	1.96 SB	49.44 SB	13.92 PB	46.37	4.60	56.75 SB	4:29.67 SB	8071	14
Daniel Golubovic	Points	863 (14)	804 (20)	790 (7)	767 (18)	841 (15)	985 (3)	795 (8)	790 (13)	689 (11)	747 (5)	8071	14
Ashley Moloney	Result	10.49	7.46	14.28	1.96	46.88	14.46	42.45	DNS			DNF	-
Ashley Moloney	Points	977 (3)	9.25 (10)	745 (17)	767 (19)	964 (3)	916 (12)	715 (14)	-			DNF	-

=== Women ===
Track and road events

Athlete	Event	Preliminary		Heat		Semi-final		Final	
Athlete	Event	Result	Rank	Result	Rank	Result	Rank	Result	Rank
Bree Masters	100 metres	N/A		11.29 PB	4 (30)	did not advance			
Jacinta Beecher	200 metres	—N/a		23.22	3 (26) Q	23.14	8 (20)	did not advance	
Ella Connolly	200 metres	—N/a		23.27	5 (29)	did not advance			
Catriona Bisset	800 metres	—N/a		2:22.25	7 (45) q	2:05.20	9 (26)	did not advance	
Claudia Hollingsworth	800 metres	—N/a		2:04.11	8 (42)	did not advance			
Tess Kirsopp-Cole	800 metres	—N/a		2:05.74	7 (43)	did not advance			
Georgia Griffith	1500 metres	—N/a		4:07.65	3 (25) Q	4:05.16	4 (13) Q	4:03.26	9
Linden Hall	1500 metres	—N/a		4:03.21	3 (3) Q	4:04.65	9 (12)	did not advance	
Jessica Hull	1500 metres	—N/a		4:04.68	2 (9) Q	4:01.81	3 (3) Q	4:01.82	7
Rose Davies	5000 metres	—N/a		15:45.95	15 (27)	—N/a		did not advance	
Jessica Hull	5000 metres	—N/a		did not start					
Natalie Rule	5000 metres	—N/a		did not finish		—N/a		did not advance	
Sarah Klein	Marathon	—N/a						2:30:10 PB	14
Liz Clay	100 metres hurdles	—N/a		DQ		did not advance			
Michelle Jenneke	100 metres hurdles	—N/a		12.84 SB	3 (11) Q	12.66 PB	5 (11)	did not advance	
Celeste Mucci	100 metres hurdles	—N/a		13.01	4 (18) q	DQ		did not advance	
Sarah Carli	400 metres hurdles	—N/a		55.89	3 (21) Q	55.57 SB	7 (21)	did not advance	
Amy Cashin	3000 metres steeplechase	—N/a		9:21.46 PB	8 (17)	—N/a		did not advance	
Brielle Erbacher	3000 metres steeplechase	—N/a		9:40.55	11 (33)	—N/a		did not advance	
Cara Feain-Ryan	3000 metres steeplechase	—N/a		9:43.41	11 (34)	—N/a		did not advance	
Rebecca Henderson	20 kilometres walk	—N/a						1:34:38	20
Jemima Montag	20 kilometres walk	—N/a						1:28:17	4
Kelly Ruddick	35 kilometres walk	—N/a						3:11:55	34

Field events

Athlete	Event	Qualification		Final	
Athlete	Event	Distance	Position	Distance	Position
Nicola Olyslagers	High jump	1.93	5 (9) q	1.96 =SB	5
Eleanor Patterson	High jump	1.93	1 (1) q	2.02 =AR	1st place, gold medalist(s)
Nina Kennedy	Pole vault	4.50	1 (1) q	4.80 SB	3rd place, bronze medalist(s)
Brooke Buschkuehl	Long jump	6.76	4 (6) Q	6.87	5
Samantha Dale	Long jump	6.04	12 (24)	did not advance	
Alexandra Hulley	Hammer throw	68.83	10 (18)	did not advance	
Kelsey-Lee Barber	Javelin throw	61.27	3 (5) q	66.91 WL	1st place, gold medalist(s)
Mackenzie Little	Javelin throw	59.06	5 (12) q	63.22 PB	5
Kathryn Mitchell	Javelin throw	53.09	14 (25)	did not advance	
