= Australia at the 2023 World Athletics Championships =

- Flag of Australia
- WA code: AUS

in Budapest, Hungary 19 August 2023 – 27 August 2023
- Competitors: 66 (29 men and 37 women)
- Medals Ranked 12th: Gold 1 Silver 2 Bronze 3 Total 6

World Athletics Championships appearances (overview)
- 1976; 1980; 1983; 1987; 1991; 1993; 1995; 1997; 1999; 2001; 2003; 2005; 2007; 2009; 2011; 2013; 2015; 2017; 2019; 2022; 2023; 2025

Australia competed at the 2023 World Athletics Championships in Budapest, Hungary, from 19 to 27 August 2023.

== Medalists ==
Medal	Athlete	Event	Date
Gold	Nina Kennedy	Women's pole vault	August 23
Silver	Jemima Montag	Women's 20 kilometres walk	August 20
Silver	Eleanor Patterson	Women's high jump	August 27
Bronze	Mackenzie Little	Women's javelin	August 25
Bronze	Kurtis Marschall	Men's pole vault	August 26
Bronze	Nicola Olyslagers	Women's high jump	August 27

== Results ==
Australia entered 66 athletes.

Key

- Q = Qualified for the next round
- q = Qualified for the next round as a fastest loser or, in field events, by position without achieving the qualifying target
- NR = National record
- PB = Personal best
- SB = Season best
- N/A = Round not applicable for the event

=== Men ===
Track and road events

Athlete	Event	Heat		Semifinal		Final	
Athlete	Event	Result	Rank	Result	Rank	Result	Rank
Rohan Browning	100 metres	10.11	2 Q	10.11	4	Did not advance	
Jake Doran	100 metres	10.48	7	Did not advance			
Aidan Murphy	200 metres	20.90	6	Did not advance			
Peter Bol	800 metres	1:46.75	5	Did not advance			
Joseph Deng	800 metres	1:45.48	3 Q	1:48.12	8	Did not advance	
Riley McGown	800 metres	1:48.38	8	Did not advance			
Stewart McSweyn	1500 metres	3:36.01	7	Did not advance			
Matthew Ramsden	1500 metres	3:46.45	13 qR	3:36.83	13	Did not advance	
Adam Spencer	1500 metres	3:34.17	3 Q	3:42.10	13	Did not advance	
Morgan McDonald	5000 metres	13:43.58	16	—N/a		Did not advance	
Stewart McSweyn	5000 metres	13:56.81	19 qR	—N/a		13:26.58	13
Nick Andrews	110 metres hurdles	13.92	9	Did not advance			
Jacob McCorry	110 metres hurdles	13.67	5	Did not advance			
Matthew Clarke	3000 metres steeplechase	8:40.92	12	—N/a		Did not advance	
Rhydian Cowley	20 kilometres walk	—N/a				1:19:31	14
Kyle Swan	20 kilometres walk	—N/a				1:26:02	40
Declan Tingay	20 kilometres walk	—N/a				1:18:30 PB	8
Rhydian Cowley	35 kilometres walk	—N/a				DNF	

Field events

Athlete	Event	Qualification		Final	
Athlete	Event	Distance	Position	Distance	Position
Joel Baden	High jump	2.14	32	Did not advance	
Brandon Starc	High jump	2.28	10 q	2.25	8
Kurtis Marschall	Pole vault	5.75	1 q	5.95 =PB	3rd place, bronze medalist(s)
Liam Adcock	Long jump	7.99	14	Did not advance	
Henry Frayne	Long jump	7.78	20	Did not advance	
Christopher Mitrevski	Long jump	7.99 SB	13	Did not advance	
Aiden Hinson	Triple jump	DNS		Did not advance	
Julian Konle	Triple jump	NM		Did not advance	
Matthew Denny	Discus throw	64.29	9 q	68.24 NR	4
Cameron McEntyre	Javelin throw	78.10	19	Did not advance	

Combined events – Decathlon

Athlete	Event	100 m	LJ	SP	HJ	400 m	110H	DT	PV	JT	1500 m	Final	Rank
Cedric Dubler	Result	10.82	7.40	12.68 SB	DNF								
Cedric Dubler	Points	901	910	648	DNF								
Daniel Golubovic	Result	11.10	7.09	15.14 SB	1.93	49.87	14.18	48.47 SB	4.80	58.95 SB	4:29.51 SB	8141	12
Daniel Golubovic	Points	838	835	798	740	821	951	839	849	722	748	8141	12
Ashley Moloney	Result	10.60	6.98	14.08	DNF								
Ashley Moloney	Points	952	809	733	DNF								

=== Women ===
Track and road events

Athlete	Event	Heat		Semifinal		Final	
Athlete	Event	Result	Rank	Result	Rank	Result	Rank
Torrie Lewis	100 metres	11.45	6	Did not advance			
Bree Masters	100 metres	11.43	5	Did not advance			
Ella Connolly	200 metres	DNS		Did not advance			
Catriona Bisset	800 metres	1:59.46	2 Q	1:59.94	6	Did not advance	
Abbey Caldwell	800 metres	2:00.29	3 Q	1:59.05	5	Did not advance	
Ellie Sanford	800 metres	2:03.55	7	Did not advance			
Abbey Caldwell	1500 metres	4:04.16	5 Q	3:59.79 PB	9	Did not advance	
Linden Hall	1500 metres	4:01.45	6 Q	4:03.96	8	Did not advance	
Jessica Hull	1500 metres	4:03.50	2 Q	3:57.85	6 Q	3:59.54	7
Rose Davies	5000 metres	15:07.93 SB	10	—N/a		Did not advance	
Jessica Hull	5000 metres	15:15.89	13	—N/a		Did not advance	
Lauren Ryan	5000 metres	15:40.23	18	—N/a		Did not advance	
Isobel Batt-Doyle	Marathon	—N/a				2:37:53	43
Sarah Klein	Marathon	—N/a				2:37:31	41
Lisa Weightman	Marathon	—N/a				2:30:50	16
Michelle Jenneke	100 metres hurdles	12.71	3 Q	12.80	5	Did not advance	
Hannah Jones	100 metres hurdles	13.05	8	Did not advance			
Celeste Mucci	100 metres hurdles	12.90	4 Q	12.97	6	Did not advance	
Sarah Carli	400 metres hurdles	55.76	6	Did not advance			
Amy Cashin	3000 metres steeplechase	9:31.07 SB	8	—N/a		Did not advance	
Brielle Erbacher	3000 metres steeplechase	9:57.11	11	—N/a		Did not advance	
Cara Feain-Ryan	3000 metres steeplechase	9:29.60 PB	7	—N/a		Did not advance	
Rebecca Henderson	20 kilometres walk	—N/a				1:35:51	32
Jemima Montag	20 kilometres walk	—N/a				1:27:16 AR	2nd place, silver medalist(s)
Olivia Sandery	20 kilometres walk	—N/a				DQ	
Rebecca Henderson	35 kilometres walk	—N/a				DNS	
Alannah Pitcher	35 kilometres walk	—N/a				2:57:55	21
Kristie Edwards; Ebony Lane; Torrie Lewis; Bree Masters	4 × 100 metres relay	DNF		—N/a		Did not advance	

Field events

Athlete	Event	Qualification		Final	
Athlete	Event	Distance	Position	Distance	Position
Nicola Olyslagers	High jump	1.92	6 q	1.99	3rd place, bronze medalist(s)
Eleanor Patterson	High jump	1.92	=1 q	1.99 SB	2nd place, silver medalist(s)
Erin Shaw	High jump	1.80	=29	Did not advance	
Nina Kennedy	Pole vault	4.65	1 Q	4.90 =WL NR	1st place, gold medalist(s)
Brooke Buschkuehl	Long jump	6.55	17	Did not advance	
Samantha Dale	Long jump	6.35	29	Did not advance	
Taryn Gollshewsky	Discus throw	58.63	20	Did not advance	
Stephanie Ratcliffe	Hammer throw	69.87	18	Did not advance	
Kelsey-Lee Barber	Javelin throw	59.66	12 q	61.19	7
Mackenzie Little	Javelin throw	63.45	2 Q	63.38	3rd place, bronze medalist(s)
Kathryn Mitchell	Javelin throw	62.10 SB	6 Q	DNS	
