= Australia at the 2007 World Championships in Athletics =

- Flag of Australia
- WA code: AUS

in Osaka, Japan 25 August 2007 – 2 September 2007
- Competitors: 44 (26 men and 18 women)
- Medals: Gold 2 Silver 0 Bronze 0 Total 2

World Championships in Athletics appearances (overview)
- 1976; 1980; 1983; 1987; 1991; 1993; 1995; 1997; 1999; 2001; 2003; 2005; 2007; 2009; 2011; 2013; 2015; 2017; 2019; 2022; 2023; 2025

Australia competed at the 2007 World Championships in Athletics in Osaka, Japan, from 25 August to 2 September 2007.

== Medalists ==
Medal	Athlete	Event	Date
Gold	Jana Rawlinson	400 metres hurdles	August 30
Gold	Nathan Deakes	50 kilometres walk	September 1

== Results ==
Australia entered 1 athletes.

Key

- Q = Qualified for the next round
- q = Qualified for the next round as a fastest loser or, in field events, by position without achieving the qualifying target
- NR = National record
- PB = Personal best
- SB = Season best
- N/A = Round not applicable for the event

=== Men ===
Track and road events

Athlete	Event	Heat		Quarter-final		Semifinal		Final		Final Rank
Athlete	Event	Result	Rank	Result	Rank	Result	Rank	Result	Rank	Final Rank
Josh Ross	100 metres	10.34 q	4	10.42	8	Did not advance				30
Patrick Johnson	100 metres	10.25 Q	3	10.29	6	Did not advance				17
Patrick Johnson	200 metres	20.48 Q, SB	3	20.62 Q	4	20.73	8	Did not advance		16
John Steffensen	400 metres	44.82 Q, SB	2	—N/a		44.95	4	Did not advance		9
Sean Wroe	400 metres	45.39 Q	3	—N/a		45.25 PB	5	Did not advance		14
Jeffrey Riseley	800 metres	1:47.44	6	—N/a		Did not advance				40
Mark Fountain	1500 metres	3:43.51	9	—N/a		Did not advance				38
Craig Mottram	5000 metres	13:36.18 Q	4	—N/a				13:56.24	13	13
Youcef Abdi	3000 metres s'chase	9:51.33	12	—N/a				Did not advance		36
Luke Adams	20 kilometres walk	—N/a						1:23:52	7	7
Jared Tallent	20 kilometres walk	—N/a						DQ		−
Duane Cousins	50 kilometres walk	—N/a						DQ		−
Nathan Deakes	50 kilometres walk	—N/a						3:43:53	1	1st place, gold medalist(s)
Chris Erickson	50 kilometres walk	—N/a						4:13:00	24	24
Adam Miller; Aaron Rouge-Serret; Matt Shirvington; Tim Williams	4 x 100 metres relay	38.73 SB	6	—N/a				Did not advance		9
Dylan Grant; Kurt Mulcahy; Mark Ormrod; Sean Wroe	4 x 400 metres relay	3:02.59 SB	6	—N/a				Did not advance		9

Field events

Athlete	Event	Qualification		Final		Final Rank
Athlete	Event	Result	Rank	Result	Rank	Final Rank
Paul Burgess	Pole vault	5.40	9	Did not advance		21
Steven Hooker	Pole vault	5.70 q	1	5.76	9	9
Chris Noffke	Long jump	7.54	13	Did not advance		27
Scott Martin	Shot put	19.81	8	Did not advance		14
Jarrod Bannister	Javelin Throw	77.57	11	Did not advance		22
Joshua Robinson	Javelin Throw	78.48	9	Did not advance		17

=== Women ===
Track and road events

Athlete	Event	Heat		Quarter-final		Semifinal		Final		Final Rank
Athlete	Event	Result	Rank	Result	Rank	Result	Rank	Result	Rank	Final Rank
Sally McLellan	100 metres	11.14 Q, PB	1	11.31 Q	4	11.32	8	Did not advance		16
Sally McLellan	100 metres hurdles	12.85 Q	2	—N/a		12.82	5	Did not advance		10
Tamsyn Lewis	800 metres	2:01.21	4	—N/a		Did not advance				28
Lisa Corrigan	1500 metres	4:11.11 Q	6	—N/a		4:08.79	12	Did not advance		17
Sarah Jamieson	1500 metres	4:10.02 q	7	—N/a		4:16.20	6	Did not advance		19
Benita Johnson	10,000 metres	—N/a						32:55.94 SB	17	16 (Note: Promoted from 17th following Elvan Abeylegesse's disqualification)
Jana Rawlinson	400 metres hurdles	54.77 Q	1	—N/a		53.57 Q	1	53.31 SB	1	1st place, gold medalist(s)
Donna MacFarlane	3000 metres s'chase	DNF		—N/a				Did not advance		−
Victoria Mitchell	3000 metres s'chase	10:06.61	14	—N/a				Did not advance		35
Jane Saville	20 kilometres walk	—N/a						DQ		−
Crystal Attenborough; Fiona Cullen; Melanie Kleeberg; Sally McLellan	4 x 100 metres relay	43.91	8	—N/a				Did not advance		14

Field events

Athlete	Event	Qualification		Final		Final Rank
Athlete	Event	Result	Rank	Result	Rank	Final Rank
Alana Boyd	Pole vault	4.20	16	Did not advance		28
Kym Howe	Pole vault	4.55 Q	4	4.50	11	11
Vicky Parnov	Pole vault	4.05	15	Did not advance		31
Bronwyn Thompson	Long jump	6.46	11	Did not advance		21
Dani Samuels	Discus throw	60.44	6	Did not advance		13

Combined events – Heptathlon

Athlete	Event	100H	HJ	SP	200 m	LJ	JT	800 m	Final	Rank
Kylie Wheeler	Result	13.87 SB	1.80	13.00	24.44 SB	6.42	38.49	2:12.81 SB	6184 SB	12
Kylie Wheeler	Points	997	978	727	939	981	638	924	6184 SB	12
