= Australia at the 2015 World Championships in Athletics =

- WA code: AUS
- National federation: Athletics Australia
- Website: www.athletics.com.au

in Beijing
- Competitors: 43
- Medals Ranked 20th: Gold 0 Silver 2 Bronze 0 Total 2

World Championships in Athletics appearances (overview)
- 1976; 1980; 1983; 1987; 1991; 1993; 1995; 1997; 1999; 2001; 2003; 2005; 2007; 2009; 2011; 2013; 2015; 2017; 2019; 2022; 2023; 2025

Australia competed at the 2015 World Championships in Athletics in Beijing, China, from 22–30 August 2015.

== Medalists ==
The following competitors from Australia won medals at the Championships

Medal	Athlete	Event	Date
Silver	Fabrice Lapierre	Men's long jump	25 August
Silver	Jared Tallent	Men's 50 kilometres walk	29 August

== Results ==
(q – qualified, NM – no mark, SB – season best)

=== Men ===
Track and road events

Athlete	Event	Heat		Semifinal		Final	
Athlete	Event	Result	Rank	Result	Rank	Result	Rank
Jeffrey Riseley	800 metres	1:46.79	14 Q	did not start		did not advance	
Josh Ralph	800 metres	1:48.90	35	did not advance			
Ryan Gregson	1500 metres	3:43.54	29	did not advance			
Collis Birmingham	5000 metres	13:34.58	15	—N/a		did not advance	
Brett Robinson	5000 metres	13:49.63	25	—N/a		did not advance	
Nicholas Hough	110 metres hurdles	13.69	28	did not advance			
James Nipperess	3000 metres steeplechase	8:56.01	33	—N/a		did not advance	
Dane Bird-Smith	20 kilometres walk	—N/a				1:21:37	8
Chris Erickson	20 kilometres walk	—N/a				1:25:15	33
Jared Tallent	20 kilometres walk	—N/a				1:24:19	26
Chris Erickson	50 kilometres walk	—N/a				3:51:26 SB	13
Jared Tallent	50 kilometres walk	—N/a				3:42:17 SB	2nd place, silver medalist(s)

Field events

Athlete	Event	Qualification		Final	
Athlete	Event	Distance	Position	Distance	Position
Fabrice Lapierre	Long jump	8.03	11 q	8.24 SB	2nd place, silver medalist(s)
Joel Baden	High jump	2.26 SB	21	did not advance	
Brandon Starc	High jump	2.31 PB	5 Q	2.25	12
Benn Harradine	Discus throw	62.48	12 q	62.05	10
Julian Wruck	Discus throw	62.63	10 q	60.01	12
Hamish Peacock	Javelin throw	79.37	18	did not advance	

=== Women ===
Track and road events

Athlete	Event	Heat		Semifinal		Final	
Athlete	Event	Result	Rank	Result	Rank	Result	Rank
Melissa Breen	100 metres	11.61	41	did not advance			
Ella Nelson	200 metres	23.33	38	did not advance			
Anneliese Rubie	400 metres	51.69 PB	23 q	52.04	22	did not advance	
Melissa Duncan	1500 metres	4:09.29	20	did not advance			
Heidi See	1500 metres	4:20.65	33	did not advance			
Madeline Heiner	5000 metres	15:47.97	16	—N/a		did not advance	
Eloise Wellings	5000 metres	15:26.67 SB	10 Q	—N/a		15:09.62 SB	10
Julia Degan	Marathon	—N/a				2:49:26 SB	46
Sinead Diver	Marathon	—N/a				2:36:38 SB	21
Sarah Klein	Marathon	—N/a				2:37:58 SB	23
Michelle Jenneke	100 metres hurdles	13.02	17 Q	13.01	18	did not advance	
Lauren Wells	400 metres hurdles	55.65 SB	12 Q	56.04	14	did not advance	
Madeline Heiner	3000 metres steeplechase	9:30.79	16	—N/a		did not advance	
Genevieve LaCaze	3000 metres steeplechase	9:39.35	22	—N/a		did not advance	
Victoria Mitchell	3000 metres steeplechase	9:43.73	26	—N/a		did not advance	
Anneliese Rubie; Jessica Gulli; Lauren Wells; Morgan Mitchell	4 × 400 metres relay	3:28.61 SB	12	—N/a		did not advance	
Kelly Ruddick	20 kilometres walk	—N/a				did not start	
Beki Smith	20 kilometres walk	—N/a				Disqualified	
Rachel Tallent	20 kilometres walk	—N/a				1:36:27	34

Field events

Athlete	Event	Qualification		Final	
Athlete	Event	Distance	Position	Distance	Position
Eleanor Patterson	High jump	1.92	=9 q	1.92	8
Alana Boyd	Pole vault	4.55	=11 q	4.60	11
Nina Kennedy	Pole vault	No mark		did not advance	
Brooke Stratton	Long jump	6.64	14	did not advance	
Dani Samuels	Discus throw	62.01	8 q	63.14	6
Kimberley Mickle	Javelin throw	59.83	22	did not advance	
Kathryn Mitchell	Javelin throw	61.04	17	did not advance	
Kelsey-Lee Roberts	Javelin throw	60.18	20	did not advance	
