= Australia at the 2017 World Championships in Athletics =

- Flag of Australia
- WA code: AUS
- National federation: Athletics Australia
- Website: www.athletics.com.au

in London, United Kingdom 4–13 August 2017
- Competitors: 61 (27 men and 34 women) in 32 events
- Medals Ranked =11th: Gold 1 Silver 1 Bronze 0 Total 2

World Championships in Athletics appearances (overview)
- 1976; 1980; 1983; 1987; 1991; 1993; 1995; 1997; 1999; 2001; 2003; 2005; 2007; 2009; 2011; 2013; 2015; 2017; 2019; 2022; 2023; 2025

Australia competed at the 2017 World Championships in Athletics in London, Great Britain, from 4–13 August 2017.

The three time World Championship medallist, Jared Tallent was forced to withdraw from the men's 50 kilometres walk event due to a hamstring injury.

== Medalists ==
Medal	Athlete	Event	Date
Gold	Sally Pearson	Women's 100 m hurdles	12 August
Silver	Dani Stevens	Women's discus throw	13 August

== Results ==
=== Men ===
Track and road events

Athlete	Event	Heat		Semifinal		Final	
Athlete	Event	Result	Rank	Result	Rank	Result	Rank
Steven Solomon	400 metres	46.27	38	Did not advance			
Peter Bol	800 metres	1:49.65	38	Did not advance			
Ryan Gregson	1500 metres	3:43.28	20	Did not advance			
Luke Mathews	1500 metres	3:38.19	1 Q	3:40.91	7	Did not advance	
Jordan Williamsz	1500 metres	3:46.11	6 Q	3:38.93	8	Did not advance	
Morgan McDonald	5000 metres	13:30.73	20	—N/a		Did not advance	
Sam McEntee	5000 metres	13:31.58	24	—N/a		Did not advance	
Patrick Tiernan	5000 metres	13:22.52	4 Q	—N/a		13:40.01	11
Patrick Tiernan	10,000 metres	—N/a				29:23.72	22
Jack Colreavy	Marathon	—N/a				2:21:44	45
Josh Harris	Marathon	—N/a				DNF	–
Brad Milosevic	Marathon	—N/a				2:25:14	60
Nicholas Hough	110 metres hurdles	13.61	27	Did not advance			
Stewart McSweyn	3000 metres steeplechase	8:47.53	40	—N/a		Did not advance	
Nick Andrews; Rohan Browning; Tom Gamble; Trae Williams	4 × 100 metres relay	38.88 SB	12	—N/a		Did not advance	
Dane Bird-Smith	20 kilometres walk	—N/a				1:19:28 PB	6
Rhydian Cowley	20 kilometres walk	—N/a				1:30:40	56

Field events

Athlete	Event	Qualification		Final	
Athlete	Event	Distance	Position	Distance	Position
Kurtis Marschall	Pole vault	5.60	=11 q	5.65	7
Henry Frayne	Long jump	7.88	14	Did not advance	
Fabrice Lapierre	Long jump	7.91	12 q	7.93	11
Damien Birkenhead	Shot put	19.90	20	Did not advance	
Mitchell Cooper	Discus throw	57.26	28	Did not advance	
Benn Harradine	Discus throw	60.95	21	Did not advance	
Hamish Peacock	Javelin throw	82.46	14	Did not advance	

Combined events – Decathlon

Athlete	Event	100 m	LJ	SP	HJ	400 m	110H	DT	PV	JT	1500 m	Final	Rank
Cedric Dubler	Result	11.06	7.29	11.36	2.08	48.31 SB	14.92	40.85 SB	4.90	52.10	4:50.31	7728	18
Cedric Dubler	Points	847	883	568	878	894	859	682	880	620	617	7728	18

=== Women ===
Track and road events

Athlete	Event	Heat		Semifinal		Final	
Athlete	Event	Result	Rank	Result	Rank	Result	Rank
Riley Day	200 metres	23.77	36	Did not advance			
Ella Nelson	200 metres	24.02	43	Did not advance			
Morgan Mitchell	400 metres	52.22	26	Did not advance			
Brittany McGowan	800 metres	2:02.75	28	Did not advance			
Lora Storey	800 metres	2:07.17	41	Did not advance			
Georgia Griffith	800 metres	2:03.54	38	Did not advance			
Georgia Griffith	1500 metres	4:08.99	27	Did not advance			
Linden Hall	1500 metres	4:10.51	33	Did not advance			
Zoe Buckman	1500 metres	4:05.44	17 q	4:05.93	14	Did not advance	
Madeline Hills	5000 metres	15:13.77	19	—N/a		Did not advance	
Heidi See	5000 metres	15:38.86	29	—N/a		Did not advance	
Eloise Wellings	5000 metres	15:25.92	27	—N/a		Did not advance	
Madeline Hills	10,000 metres	—N/a				32:48.57	26
Eloise Wellings	10,000 metres	—N/a				32:26.31 SB	22
Milly Clark	Marathon	—N/a				2:35:27	24
Sinead Diver	Marathon	—N/a				2:33:26	20
Jessica Trengove	Marathon	—N/a				2:28:59	9
Michelle Jenneke	100 metres hurdles	13.11	22 q	13.25	21	Did not advance	
Sally Pearson	100 metres hurdles	12.72	3 Q	12.53	1 Q	12.59	1st place, gold medalist(s)
Lauren Wells	400 metres hurdles	56.49	25	Did not advance			
Genevieve LaCaze	3000 metres steeplechase	9:27.53 SB	7 Q	—N/a		9:26.25 SB	12
Victoria Mitchell	3000 metres steeplechase	10:00.40	33	—N/a		Did not advance	
Anneliese Rubie; Ella Connolly; Lauren Wells; Morgan Mitchell	4 × 400 metres relay	3:28.02 SB	10	—N/a		Did not advance	
Regan Lamble	20 kilometres walk	—N/a				1:31:30	22
Beki Smith	20 kilometres walk	—N/a				1:35:31	38
Claire Tallent	20 kilometres walk	—N/a				1:37:05 SB	43

Field events

Athlete	Event	Qualification		Final	
Athlete	Event	Distance	Position	Distance	Position
Liz Parnov	Pole vault	4.35	=15	Did not advance	
Naa Anang	Long jump	6.27	22	Did not advance	
Brooke Stratton	Long jump	6.46	11 q	6.67	6
Dani Stevens	Discus throw	65.56	3 Q	69.64 AR	2nd place, silver medalist(s)
Kathryn Mitchell	Javelin throw	57.42	25	Did not advance	
Kelsey-Lee Roberts	Javelin throw	63.70	7 Q	60.76	10
