= 2009 World Championships in Athletics – Men's 4 × 400 metres relay =

The men's 4 × 400 metres relay at the 2009 World Championships in Athletics was held at the Olympic Stadium on August 22 and August 23.

Britain's Conrad Williams looked to be leading the stagger on the first leg, but a late rush by Arismendy Peguero had the Dominican Republic making the handoff even, while USA put hurdler Angelo Taylor on the first leg, so they started with a slight deficit. Jeremy Wariner had won the previous two world championships in the open 400 metres, but lost his title a few days earlier. He had something to prove, flying through the turn, Wariner put the USA into the lead by the break. After he passed Yon Soriano on the inside, Soriano accelerated to challenge Wariner for the pole position. Warner held the pole, behind Soriano, Ben Offereins was able to sneak Australia into third while Michael Bingham was being challenged by Piotr Klimczak for Poland. Bingham was able to get around Thomas and then Soriano, putting Great Britain into a solid second place by the straightaway, but Wariner was running away from the pack. Soriano paid for his exuberance and slowed down the home stretch as all the other teams passed him by the exchange. Warner had opened up a 15-metre gap, the USA had completed their exchange before the other teams arrived. Because of the change in positions, Bingham had to cross in front of several teams to make their exchange, and Kévin Borlée ran Belgium from last to fourth on the straight. Kerron Clement for USA and far behind him Robert Tobin for Great Britain had clear sailing, behind them Australia and Belgium came out of the exchange best. Tobin ran conservatively down the backstretch while Tristan Thomas accelerated to go around him on the turn. Coming off the turn, Tobin regained second position and was gaining on Clement. USA had new world champion LaShawn Merritt on the anchor he immediately started widening the gap on Martyn Rooney for Britain. Australia's Sean Wroe had a significant gap on Belgium, while Yannick Fonsat brought France from last place to almost even with Belgium at the exchange. As Merritt kept widening the gap, Wroe was gaining on Rooney coming off the turn Wroe was perfectly positioned to punch for the silver medal position, but Rooney held him off, looking back to be sure he was holding clear. USA finished with a 25-metre lead.

== Medalists ==
Gold	Silver	Bronze
United States; Angelo Taylor; Jeremy Wariner; Kerron Clement; LaShawn Merritt; Lionel Larry*; Bershawn Jackson*	Great Britain & N.I. Conrad Williams; Michael Bingham; Robert Tobin; Martyn Rooney; Dai Greene*	Australia; John Steffensen; Ben Offereins; Tristan Thomas; Sean Wroe; Joel Milburn*

* Runners who participated in the heats only and received medals.

== Records ==
Prior to the competition, the following records were as follows.

World record	United States (USA); Andrew Valmon, Quincy Watts, Butch Reynolds, Michael Johnson	2:54.29	Stuttgart, Germany	22 August 1993
Championship record	United States (USA); Andrew Valmon, Quincy Watts, Butch Reynolds, Michael Johnson	2:54.29	Stuttgart, Germany	22 August 1993
World Leading	Bahamas (BAH); Andrae Williams, Michael Mathieu, Nathaniel McKinney, Chris Brown	3:00.29	Philadelphia, United States	25 April 2009
African Record	Nigeria (NGR); Clement Chukwu, Jude Monye, Enefiok Udo-Obong, Sunday Bada	2:58.68	Sydney, Australia	30 September 2000
Asian Record	Japan (JPN); Koji Ito, Jun Osakada, Shigekazu Ōmori, Shunji Karube	3:00.76	Atlanta, United States	3 August 1996
North American Record	United States (USA); Andrew Valmon, Quincy Watts, Butch Reynolds, Michael Johnson	2:54.29	Stuttgart, Germany	22 August 1993
South American record	Brazil (BRA); Cleverson da Silva, Claudinei da Silva, Eronilde de Araújo, Sanderlei Parrela	2:58.56	Winnipeg, Canada	30 July 1999
European Record	Great Britain (GBR); Iwan Thomas, Jamie Baulch, Roger Black, Mark Richardson	2:56.60	Atlanta, United States	3 August 1996
Oceanian Record	Australia (AUS); Darren Clark, Rick Mitchell, Gary Minihan, Bruce Frayne	2:59.70	Los Angeles, United States	11 August 1984

No new world or championship record was set during this competition.

== Qualification standards ==
Standard
3:03.30

== Schedule ==
Date	Time	Round
August 22, 2009	18:55	Heats
August 23, 2009	18:15	Final

== Results ==
=== Heats ===
Qualification: First 3 of each heat (Q) plus the 2 fastest times (q) advance to the final.

Rank	Heat	Nation	Athletes	Time	Notes
1	1	United States	Lionel Larry, Kerron Clement, Bershawn Jackson, Angelo Taylor	3:01.40	Q
2	1	France	Leslie Djhone, Teddy Venel, Yannick Fonsat, Yoann Décimus	3:01.65	Q, SB
3	1	Great Britain & N.I.	Conrad Williams, Robert Tobin, Dai Greene, Martyn Rooney	3:01.91	Q
4	1	Australia	Joel Milburn, Tristan Thomas, Ben Offereins, Sean Wroe	3:02.04	q, SB
5	2	Belgium	Antoine Gillet, Cédric Van Branteghem, Nils Duerinck, Kévin Borlée	3:02.13	Q, SB
6	1	Nigeria	Saul Weigopwa, Noah Akwu, Amaechi Morton, Bola Gee Lawal	3:02.36	q
7	2	Dominican Republic	Gustavo Cuesta, Arismendy Peguero, Yoel Tapia, Félix Sánchez	3:02.76	Q
8	1	Russia	Maksim Dyldin, Valentin Kruglyakov, Konstantin Svechkar, Aleksandr Derevyagin	3:02.78	
9	2	Poland	Piotr Klimczak, Marcin Marciniszyn, Rafał Wieruszewski, Jan Ciepiela	3:03.23	Q, SB
10	2	Germany	Martin Grothkopp, Kamghe Gaba, Eric Krüger, Ruwen Faller	3:03.52	
11	2	Jamaica	Leford Green, Ricardo Chambers, Isa Phillips, Jermaine Gonzales	3:04.45	
12	2	South Africa	Ofentse Mogawane, Jacob Mothsodi Ramokoka, Sibusiso Sishi, Pieter Smith	3:07.88	
	2	Bahamas	Ramon Miller, Avard Moncur, LaToy Williams, Nathaniel McKinney	DQ	

Key: DQ = Disqualified, Q = qualification by place in heat, q = qualification by overall place, SB = Seasonal best

=== Final ===
Rank	Lane	Nation	Competitors	Time	Notes
1st place, gold medalist(s)	4	United States	Angelo Taylor, Jeremy Wariner, Kerron Clement, LaShawn Merritt	2:57.86	WL
2nd place, silver medalist(s)	7	Great Britain & N.I.	Conrad Williams, Michael Bingham, Robert Tobin, Martyn Rooney	3:00.53	SB
3rd place, bronze medalist(s)	2	Australia	John Steffensen, Ben Offereins, Tristan Thomas, Sean Wroe	3:00.90	SB
4	5	Belgium	Antoine Gillet, Kévin Borlée, Nils Duerinck, Cedric van Branteghem	3:01.88	SB
5	8	Poland	Marcin Marciniszyn, Piotr Klimczak, Kacper Kozłowski, Jan Ciepiela	3:02.23	SB
6	6	Dominican Republic	Arismendy Peguero, Yon Soriano, Yoel Tapia, Félix Sánchez	3:02.47	
7	3	France	Leslie Djhone, Teddy Venel, Yannick Fonsat, Yoann Décimus	3:02.65	
8	1	Nigeria	Saul Welgopwa, Noah Akwu, Amaechi Morton, Bola Gee Lawal	3:02.73	

Key: SB = Seasonal best, WL = World leading (in a given season)
