= Ben Offereins =

Australian sprinter

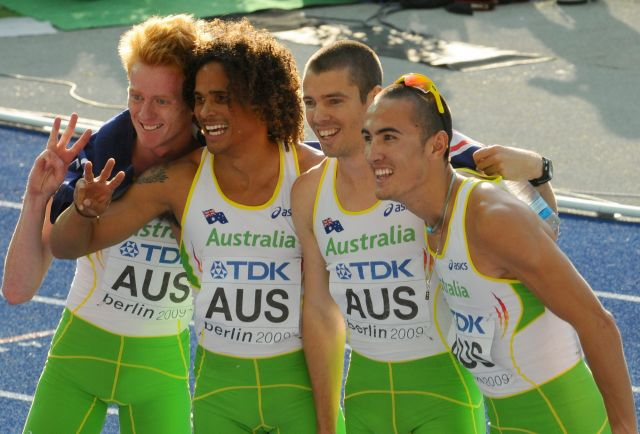
- Offereins (second from the right) after winning the 4 x 400m relay bronze medal at the 2009 World Championships

Personal information
- Born: 12 March 1986 (age 40)
- Height: 184 cm (6 ft 0 in)
- Weight: 76 kg (168 lb)

Sport
- Country: Australia
- Sport: Athletics
- Event: 4 × 400m Relay
Medal record
World Championships
Bronze medal – third place	Berlin 2009	4 x 400 m relay
Commonwealth Games
Gold medal – first place	2010 Delhi	4 x 400 m relay

Ben Offereins (born 12 March 1986) is an Australian track and field athlete. He became national 400 m champion and also represented Australia internationally.

== Biography ==
Born in Sydney, Offereins' family moved to Perth in 1987. He has been running from a young age, starting out in little athletics and has progressed through to the senior ranks. His first National title came in winning the 200m at the 2003 Under 18 Australian Championships where he also won the silver medal in the 100m.

He had his first major 400m win the next year at the Under 20 Australian Championships, which earned him a position on the Australian team for the IAAF World Junior Championships, in Grosseto, Italy in July 2004. He participated in the individual 400m as well as the 4 × 400 m relay. In 2005 still as a junior he entered the open Australian National Championships for the 400m where he won the gold medal defeating 3 members of the Australian 4 × 400 m relay team which won the silver medal at the 2004 Athens Olympics. The next few seasons saw Offereins plagued by injuries until June 2009 when he set a new personal best for the 400m of 45.69s, a World Championships B qualifier, which earned him the final position on the Australian 4 × 400 m relay team for Berlin 2009. Running a sensational third leg during the heat (44.78s) Offereins forced his way into the team for the final where the Australian team of John Steffensen, Ben Offereins, Tristan Thomas, and Sean Wroe, won the bronze medal for Australia.

In 2010 Offereins started his season by winning the Australia Cup held in Canberra in a new PB of 45.32 sec, he then broke his PB again at the Sydney Track Classic running 44.86sec and becoming only the eighth Australian to break the 45.00 sec barrier and the seventh fastest Australian of all time. He continued his form, winning the IAAF Melbourne Track Classic in 45.73sec, and then the Australian National Championships in 45.17 sec. This gained him automatic selection for the individual 400m and the 4x400 relay at the 2010 Commonwealth Games in Delhi, India. At the Athletics Australia annual end of season awards night he was named the Male athlete of the year for the 2010 Australian Domestic season.

He represented Australia at the 2012 Summer Olympics, as part of the men's 4 x 400-metre relay team.
