= Joel Milburn =

Australian sprinter

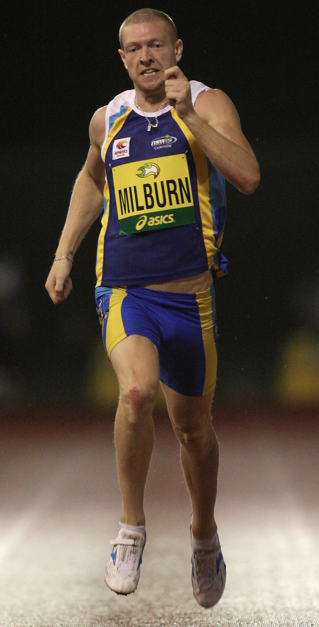
- Joel Milburn 2010 Commonwealth Games 400 m Semi Final

Personal information
- Born: 17 March 1986 (age 40) Sydney, Australia
- Height: 1.83 m (6 ft 0 in)
- Weight: 76 kg (168 lb)

Sport
- Sport: Athletics
- Event(s): 400 m, 4 × 400 m relay
Medal record
Competitor for Australia
Commonwealth Games
Gold medal – first place	2010 Delhi	Men's 4 × 400 metres relay
World Championships
Bronze medal – third place	Berlin 2009	4 × 400 m relay
Universiade
Silver medal – second place	Bangkok 2007	4 × 400 m relay

Joel Milburn (born 17 March 1986) is an Australian Dual Olympic 400 m sprinter, Olympic Finalist, Commonwealth Games Gold Medalist and World Championships Bronze Medalist. His Personal Best time for the 400 m is 44.80 seconds which he achieved in at the 2008 Summer Olympics in Beijing. Joel won the Australian National 400 m Championship in 2008.

At the 2008 Summer Olympics in Beijing Joel competed in the Men's 400 m individual and Men's 4 x 400 m relay. He was a semi-finals of the individual 400 meters competition placing 13th overall and 5th in the 4 × 400 m relay with a time of 3.00.02 after Russia was disqualified. At the 2010 Commonwealth Games, Joel won a gold medal in the 4 × 400 m relay and placed 5th in the Men's 400 m individual final. Joel has represented Australia numerous times at the IAAF World Championships, IAAF World Indoor Championships, Commonwealth Games as well as the Asia-Pacific region (55 nations) at the 2010 IAAF Continental Cup in the 4 × 400 m relay.

Personal Bests
Event	Result	Wind	Venue	Date
100 m	10.85	+1.3	Sydney	27.10.2007
200 m	21.09	+1.4	Sydney	27.03.2010
400 m	44.80		Beijing	18.08.2008
4 × 400 m Relay	300.02		Beijing	23.08.2010

Joel Milburn's Australian Caps and international representation:

- 2012 Olympic Games - London, England. (DNS)
- 2010 Commonwealth Games - Delhi, India.
- 2010 IAAF Continental Cup - Split, Croatia.
- 2009 IAAF World Championships - Berlin, Germany.
- 2008 Beijing Olympic Games - Beijing, China.
- 2008 IAAF World Indoor Championships - Valencia Spain.
- 2007 World University Games - Bangkok, Thailand.
- 2004 IAAF World Junior Championships - Grosseto, Italy. - (DNS)
- 2003 IAAF World Youth Championships - Sherbrooke, Canada.

== Personal ==
Joel was arrested in Sydney on 17 October 2019 and accused of possessing a small amount of a prohibited drug. Charges were dismissed in court.

Joel completed a Psychology degree at Macquarie University in 2012 and has a Graduate Diploma in Business Management. He currently is employed in management in Cyber Security in Sydney for a large cyber security firm.
