= Edward Trippas =

Australian athlete

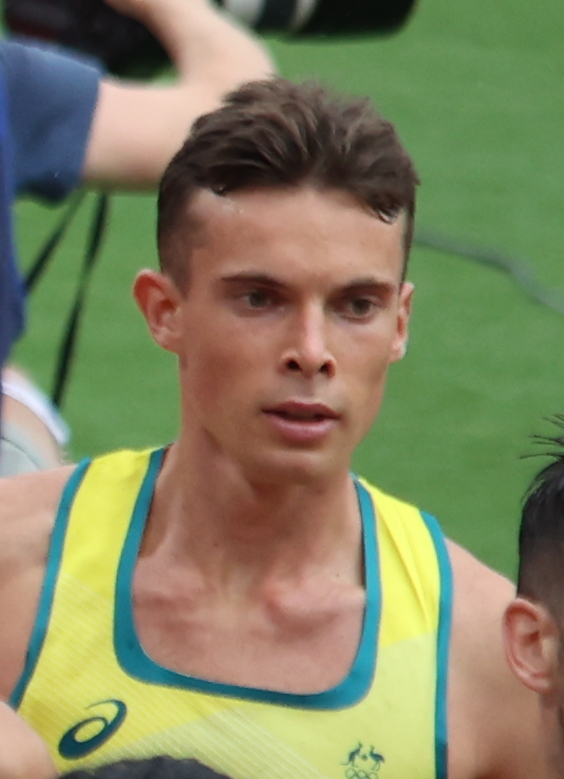
- Edward Trippas at the 2020 Summer Olympics

Personal information
- Nationality: Australian
- Born: Edward Trippas; 22 September 1998 (age 27)

Sport
- Sport: Athletics
- Event: 3000m steeplechase
- College team: Princeton Tigers
- Club: OAC Oceania

Achievements and titles
- Personal best: 8:19.60 (Castellón 2021)
Medal record
Men's athletics
Representing Australia
Oceania Athletics Championships
| Bronze medal – third place | 2024 Suva | 3000 m s'chase |

Edward Trippas (born 22 September 1998) is an Australian runner who competes in the 3000 metres steeplechase.

== Early years ==
Trippas was 8 years old when he started in Little Athletics at the insistence of his parents. He enjoyed the social aspect of the sport and started running steeplechase at the age of 15. Within two years he ran a time of 5:55 (2000m steeple) and 9:04 for the 3000m steeplechase. Both performances earned him national medals. In 2017 he made his international debut in the junior event at the World Cross Country Championships.

== Career ==
Trippas left Sydney and studied at Princeton University where he was coached by Jason Vigilante and ran in the NCAA championships. Trippas took a hiatus from his studies in order to try and concentrate achieving a place at the Olympics. His personal best time placed him third on the all time Australian list for the 3000 metres steeplechase.

In July 2021, Trippas was named in the Australian team to compete at the delayed 2020 Summer Games in Tokyo. He ran eleventh in his Men's 3000m steeplechase heat at the Tokyo 2020 Olympics in a time of 8:29.90, missing out on the final.

He now competes for On. In September 2025, he competed in the 3000 metres steeplechase at the 2025 World Championships in Tokyo, Japan.

On 12 April 2026, he won the 3000 metres steeplechase title at the 2026 Australian Championships.
