= 2009 World Championships in Athletics =

Athletics competition in Berlin, Germany

- Host city: Berlin, Germany
- Nations: 202
- Athletes: 2101
- Events: 47
- Dates: 15–23 August 2009
- Opened by: President Horst Köhler
- Closed by: IAAF President Lamine Diack
- Main venue: Olympiastadion

The 12th IAAF World Championships in Athletics (German: Leichtathletik-Weltmeisterschaften 2009) were held in Berlin, Germany from 15 to 23 August 2009. The majority of events took place in the Olympiastadion, while the marathon and racewalking events started and finished at the Brandenburg Gate.

== Organization ==
=== Bidding process ===
Berlin was announced the winning bidder by the IAAF on 6 December 2004 beating out bids from Split (Croatia), Valencia (Spain), Brisbane (Australia), Brussels (Belgium), Delhi (India), Casablanca (Morocco) and Daegu (South Korea). The city of Berlin and the Deutscher Leichtathletik-Verband (German Athletics Association) are responsible for the organisation of the event. The Berlin Organising Committee 2009 GmbH, a corporation established by the DLV in 2005, will supervise the operative organisation of the competition.

=== Costs ===
Building upon Germany's history of successful athletics events, including the 1974 and 2006 FIFA World Cups the 1993 World Championships in Athletics, the 1936 and 1972 Summer Olympics, IAAF president Lamine Diack was confident of a well organised competition. The organizers announced a budget of €49.8 million to stage the event, which includes the travel and accommodation costs for all participating athletes. Revenues include €17 million from ticketing and €7 million from marketing. The city of Berlin will cover a deficit up to €20 million. The organising committee secured 9000 rooms in the city to account for accommodation, with the hope that the booking of the Hotel Estrel (950 rooms) and Hotel Berlin (650 rooms) for athletes would create an atmosphere similar to an Olympic Village.

Overall, the event was an economic success for the capital. A total of 417,156 tickets were sold over the nine-day period, and estimates placed the total visitor spend in the city at around €120 million. As a result, Berlin's mayor, Klaus Wowereit, stated that the city would consider applying to host another athletics event in the future, such as the 2016 European Athletics Championships.

=== Media and marketing ===
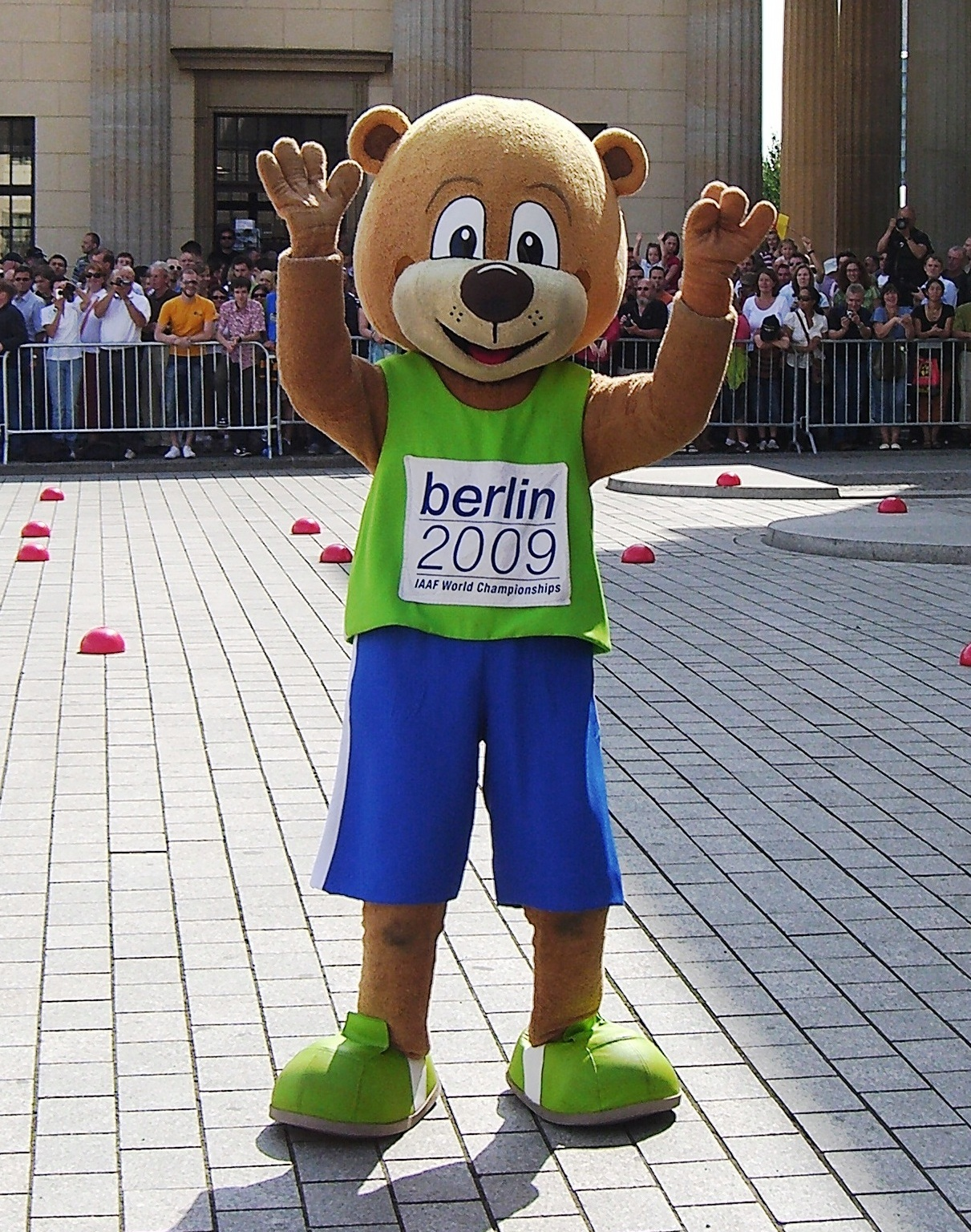
Mascot "Berlino"

A limited edition €10 coin was produced for the event by the German government, which was only the third occasion that they had done so for a sporting event. The organising committee held a contest to decide the name of its mascot, a running anthropomorphic bear, and the name "Berlino" was chosen. The colour scheme of the event, including the official logo, advertising, and the Olympiastadion's track and field, was blue and green. The committee stated that blue represented reliability while green represented the event's environmental ambitions. The event featured a number of environmentally friendly initiatives, including: free public transport with every ticket sold, efforts to reduce energy usage, considerations for waste and recycling management, and environmentally conscious construction and building management. Furthermore, as part of the United Nations Environment Programme, forty-seven trees (one for each athletics event) were planted to create an "Avenue of Champions" in Berlin. The official song for the event was "Foot of the Mountain" by Norwegian group A-ha.

The broadcasting rights for the Championships were sold to 213 countries, a new high for the event. ARD and ZDF were the host broadcasting TV networks and producers of the TV signal, and they founded a company named BERTA which provided the signal in high-resolution HDTV for TV stations around the world. The average viewing figures in Germany were 5 million with peaks of 9.9 and 8.6 million for the men's 100 metres final and the women's high jump, respectively. The average audience figures in France were 3.5–4 million, 2.5–3.5 million in the United Kingdom and 4–5 million in Japan. The IAAF website received a record number of page hits and unique users: having around 1 million unique users accessing the website on days five and six, and a total of over 90 million page views over the course of the nine days of the competition. Around 3500 media representatives were estimated to have attended the event.

To provide the public with an opportunity to participate in the event, the local organizers also conducted a Champions Run 10K on 22 August between the scheduled time for the men's and women's marathons, using a portion of the official marathon course which passes various Berlin landmarks with a finish at the Brandenburg Gate. The field was limited to 10,000 runners.

=== Venues ===
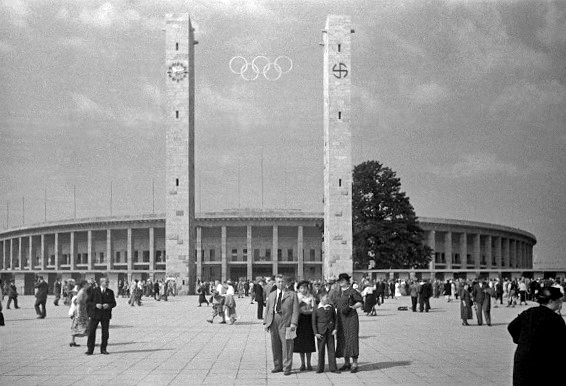
Olympiastadion hosting the 1936 Summer Olympics

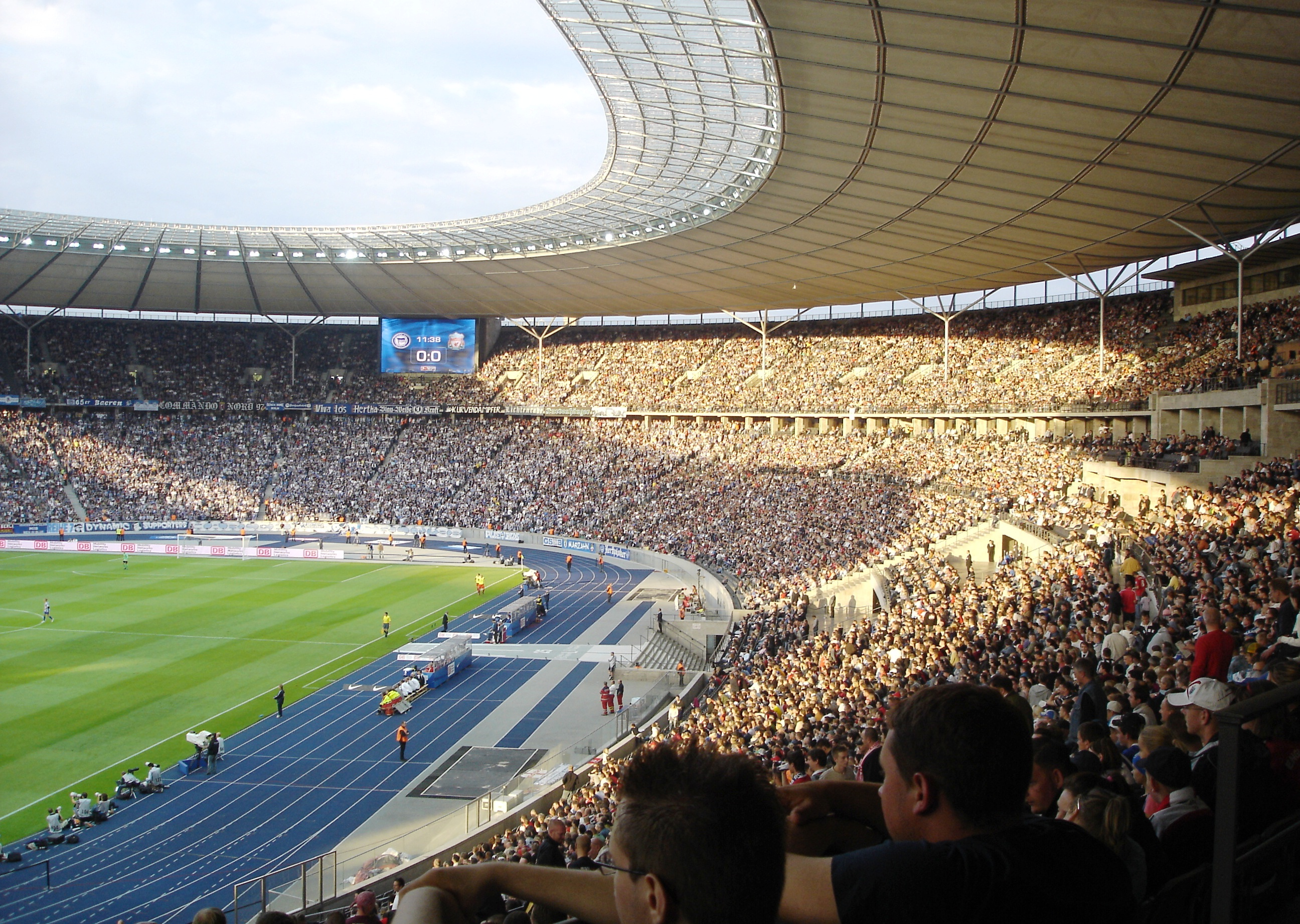
The Olympiastadion with its new blue race track

The Championships were staged in the 74,845-seat Olympiastadion, which underwent a €242 million renovation ahead of the 2006 Football World Cup. The marathon races, as well as the racewalking events, had their start and finish at the Brandenburg Gate, with the race walks routed along the Unter den Linden boulevard and the marathon passing through Pariser Platz and going past Berlin's other points of interest. An estimated 400,000 tickets were sold by the event organisers for the event. In memory of their historic Olympic achievements at the Olympiastadion in 1936, a meeting took place between the families of Luz Long and Jesse Owens. Long's long jump advice to rival Owens remains a prominent example of sportsmanship and friendship in athletics. A reward of US$100,000 was given to any athlete who broke a world record at the competition.

=== Anti-doping program ===
The event featured one of the most comprehensive anti-doping initiatives ever undertaken by the IAAF. A total of 1000 samples were collected from athletes and tested at labs accredited by the World Anti-Doping Agency, and additional educational anti-doping activities were available. Diack stressed that samples are retained for future analysis, thus currently undetectable drugs could be tested for in the future, preventing athletes from flouting the anti-doping rules.

Two athletes failed anti-doping tests during the championships: Moroccan steeplechaser Jamel Chatbi tested positive for the stimulant clenbuterol and Nigerian hurdler Amaka Ogoegbunam was found to have Metenolone, an anabolic steroid, in her sample. Another Nigerian hurdler, Olutoyin Augustus, was banned from the championships for having abnormal levels of testosterone.

== Event schedule ==
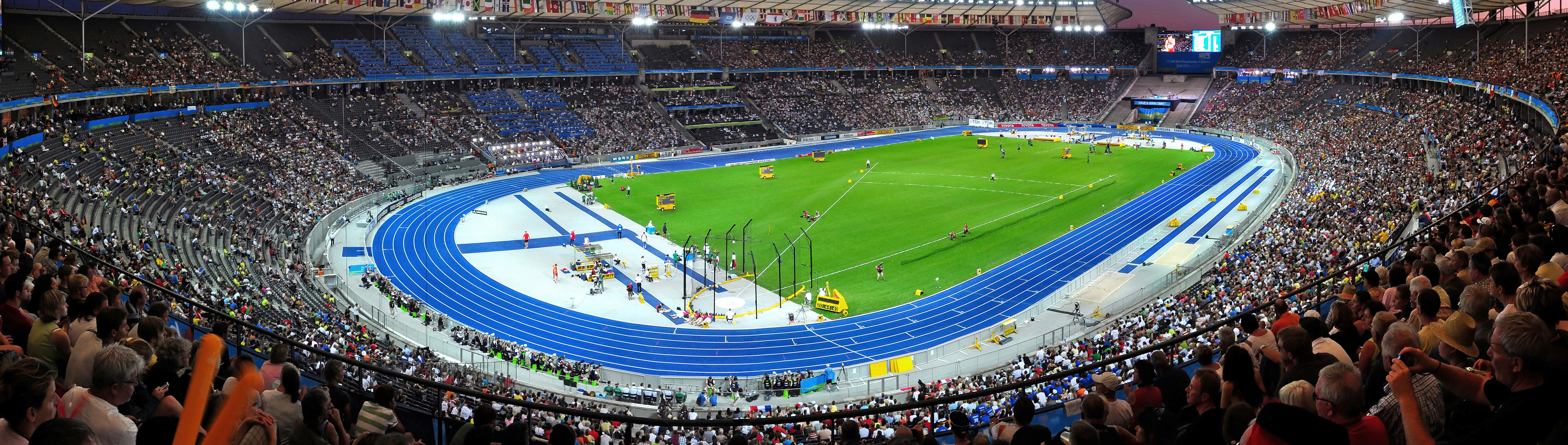

Legend
| Key | P | Q | H | ½ | F |
| Value | Preliminary round | Qualifiers | Heats | Semifinals | Final |

All dates are CEST (UTC+2)

Men
| August | 15 | | 16 | | 17 | 18 | 19 | 20 | | 21 | 22 | 23 |
|---|---|---|---|---|---|---|---|---|---|---|---|---|
| 100 m | H | | ½ | F | | | | | | | | |
| 200 m | | | | | | H | ½ | F | | | | |
| 400 m | | | | | | H | ½ | | | F | | |
| 800 m | | | | | | | | H | | ½ | | F |
| 1500 m | H | | | | ½ | | F | | | | | |
| 5000 m | | | | | | | | H | | | | F |
| 10,000 m | | | | | F | | | | | | | |
| Marathon | | | | | | | | | | | F | |
| 110 m hurdles | | | | | | | H | ½ | F | | | |
| 400 m hurdles | H | | ½ | | | F | | | | | | |
| 3000 m steeplechase | | | H | | | F | | | | | | |
| 4 × 100 m relay | | | | | | | | | | H | F | |
| 4 × 400 m relay | | | | | | | | | | | H | F |
| 20 km walk | F | | | | | | | | | | | |
| 50 km walk | | | | | | | | | | F | | |
| Long jump | | | | | | | | Q | | | F | |
| Triple jump | | | Q | | | F | | | | | | |
| High jump | | | | | | | Q | | | F | | |
| Pole vault | | | | | | | | Q | | | F | |
| Shot put | Q | F | | | | | | | | | | |
| Discus throw | | | | | | Q | F | | | | | |
| Hammer throw | Q | | | | F | | | | | | | |
| Javelin throw | | | | | | | | | | Q | | F |
| Decathlon | | | | | | | F | | | | | |

Women
| August | 15 | 16 | | 17 | | 18 | 19 | 20 | 21 | 22 | | 23 |
|---|---|---|---|---|---|---|---|---|---|---|---|---|
| 100 m | | H | | ½ | F | | | | | | | |
| 200 m | | | | | | | H | ½ | F | | | |
| 400 m | H | ½ | | | | F | | | | | | |
| 800 m | | H | | ½ | | | F | | | | | |
| 1500 m | | | | | | H | | | ½ | | | F |
| 5000 m | | | | | | | H | | | F | | |
| 10,000 m | F | | | | | | | | | | | |
| Marathon | | | | | | | | | | | | F |
| 100 m hurdles | | | | | | H | F | | | | | |
| 400 m hurdles | | | | H | | ½ | | F | | | | |
| 3000 m steeplechase | H | | | F | | | | | | | | |
| 4 × 100 m relay | | | | | | | | | | H | F | |
| 4 × 400 m relay | | | | | | | | | | H | | F |
| 20 km walk | | F | | | | | | | | | | |
| | – | | | | | | | | | | | |
| Long jump | | | | | | | | | Q | | | F |
| Triple jump | Q | | | F | | | | | | | | |
| High jump | | | | | | Q | | F | | | | |
| Pole vault | Q | | | F | | | | | | | | |
| Shot put | | Q | F | | | | | | | | | |
| Discus throw | | | | | | | Q | | F | | | |
| Hammer throw | | | | | | | | Q | | F | | |
| Javelin throw | | Q | | | | F | | | | | | |
| Heptathlon | F | | | | | | | | | | | |

== Men's results ==
=== Track ===
Chronology: 2005 | 2007 | 2009 | 2011 | 2013

| Event | Gold | | Silver | | Bronze | |
|---|---|---|---|---|---|---|
| 100 metres | Usain Bolt; Jamaica (JAM) | 9.58; WR | Tyson Gay; United States (USA) | 9.71; NR | Asafa Powell; Jamaica (JAM) | 9.84; SB |
| 200 metres | Usain Bolt; Jamaica (JAM) | 19.19; WR | Alonso Edward; Panama (PAN) | 19.81; AR | Wallace Spearmon; United States (USA) | 19.85; SB |
| 400 metres | LaShawn Merritt; United States (USA) | 44.06; WL | Jeremy Wariner; United States (USA) | 44.60; SB | Renny Quow; Trinidad and Tobago (TRI) | 45.02 |
| 800 metres | Mbulaeni Mulaudzi; South Africa (RSA) | 1:45.29 | Alfred Kirwa Yego; Kenya (KEN) | 1:45.35 | Yusuf Saad Kamel; Bahrain (BHR) | 1:45.35 |
| 1500 metres | Yusuf Saad Kamel; Bahrain (BHR) | 3:35.93 | Deresse Mekonnen; Ethiopia (ETH) | 3:36.01 | Bernard Lagat; United States (USA) | 3:36.20 |
| 5000 metres | Kenenisa Bekele; Ethiopia (ETH) | 13:17.09 | Bernard Lagat; United States (USA) | 13:17.33 | James Kwalia C'Kurui; Qatar (QAT) | 13:17.78 |
| 10,000 metres | Kenenisa Bekele; Ethiopia (ETH) | 26:46.31; CR | Zersenay Tadese; Eritrea (ERI) | 26:50.12; SB | Moses Ndiema Masai; Kenya (KEN) | 26:57.39; SB |
| Marathon | Abel Kirui; Kenya (KEN) | 2:06:54; CR | Emmanuel Kipchirchir Mutai; Kenya (KEN) | 2:07:48 | Tsegay Kebede; Ethiopia (ETH) | 2:08:35 |
| 110 metres hurdles | Ryan Brathwaite; Barbados (BAR) | 13.14; NR | Terrence Trammell; United States (USA) | 13.15 | David Payne; United States (USA) | 13.15 |
| 400 metres hurdles | Kerron Clement; United States (USA) | 47.91; WL | Javier Culson; Puerto Rico (PUR) | 48.09; PB | Bershawn Jackson; United States (USA) | 48.23 |
| 3000 metres steeplechase | Ezekiel Kemboi; Kenya (KEN) | 8:00.43; CR | Richard Kipkemboi Mateelong; Kenya (KEN) | 8:00.89; PB | Bouabdellah Tahri; France (FRA) | 8:01.18; AR |
| 20 kilometres walk | Wang Hao; China (CHN) | 1:19:06; PB | Eder Sánchez; Mexico (MEX) | 1:19:22; SB | Giorgio Rubino; Italy (ITA) | 1:19:50 |
| 20 kilometres walk | Valeriy Borchin; Russia (RUS) | 1:18:41 | Eder Sánchez; Mexico (MEX) | | Giorgio Rubino; Italy (ITA) | |
| 50 kilometres walk | Trond Nymark; Norway (NOR) | 3:41:16; NR | Jesús Ángel García; Spain (ESP) | 3:41:37; SB | Grzegorz Sudoł; Poland (POL) | 3:42:34; PB |
| 50 kilometres walk | Sergey Kirdyapkin; Russia (RUS) | 3:38:35; WL | Jesús Ángel García; Spain (ESP) | 3:41:37; SB | Grzegorz Sudoł; Poland (POL) | 3:42:34; PB |
| 4 × 100 metres relay | Jamaica; Steve Mullings; Michael Frater; Usain Bolt; Asafa Powell; Dwight Thomas*; Lerone Clarke* | 37.31; WR | Trinidad and Tobago; Darrel Brown; Marc Burns; Emmanuel Callander; Richard Thompson; Keston Bledman* | 37.62; NR | Great Britain & N.I. Simeon Williamson; Tyrone Edgar; Marlon Devonish; Harry Aikines-Aryeetey | 38.02; SB |
| 4 × 400 metres relay | United States; Angelo Taylor; Jeremy Wariner; Kerron Clement; LaShawn Merritt; Lionel Larry*; Bershawn Jackson* | 2:57.86; WL | Great Britain & N.I. Conrad Williams; Michael Bingham; Robert Tobin; Martyn Rooney; Dai Greene* | 3:00.53; SB | Australia; John Steffensen; Ben Offereins; Tristan Thomas; Sean Wroe; Joel Milburn* | 3:00.90; SB |
WR world record | AR area record | CR championship record | GR games record | NR national record | OR Olympic record | PB personal best | SB season best | WL world leading (in a given season)

* Runners who participated in the heats only and received medals.

=== Field ===
Chronology: 2005 | 2007 | 2009 | 2011 | 2013

| Event | Gold | | Silver | | Bronze | |
|---|---|---|---|---|---|---|
| High jump | Yaroslav Rybakov; Russia (RUS) | 2.32 m | Kyriakos Ioannou; Cyprus (CYP) | 2.32 m | Sylwester Bednarek; Poland (POL) Raúl Spank; Germany (GER) | 2.32 m |
| Pole vault | Steven Hooker; Australia (AUS) | 5.90 m | Romain Mesnil; France (FRA) | 5.85 m | Renaud Lavillenie; France (FRA) | 5.80 m |
| Long jump | Dwight Phillips; United States (USA) | 8.54 m | Godfrey Khotso Mokoena; South Africa (RSA) | 8.47 m | Mitchell Watt; Australia (AUS) | 8.37 m |
| Triple jump | Phillips Idowu; Great Britain & N.I. (GBR) | 17.73 m WL | Nelson Évora; Portugal (POR) | 17.55 m | Alexis Copello; Cuba (CUB) | 17.36 m |
| Shot put | Christian Cantwell; United States (USA) | 22.03 m WL | Tomasz Majewski; Poland (POL) | 21.91 m | Ralf Bartels; Germany (GER) | 21.37 m PB |
| Discus throw | Robert Harting; Germany (GER) | 69.43 m PB | Piotr Małachowski; Poland (POL) | 69.15 m NR | Gerd Kanter; Estonia (EST) | 66.88 m |
| Javelin throw | Andreas Thorkildsen; Norway (NOR) | 89.59 m SB | Guillermo Martinez; Cuba (CUB) | 86.41 m SB | Yukifumi Murakami; Japan (JPN) | 82.97 m |
| Hammer throw | Primož Kozmus; Slovenia (SLO) | 80.84 m SB | Szymon Ziółkowski; Poland (POL) | 79.30 m SB | Aleksey Zagornyi; Russia (RUS) | 78.09 m |
| Decathlon | Trey Hardee; United States (USA) | 8790 pts WL | Leonel Suárez; Cuba (CUB) | 8640 pts | Oleksiy Kasyanov; Ukraine (UKR)* | 8479 pts PB |
| Decathlon | Trey Hardee; United States (USA) | 8790 pts WL | Leonel Suárez; Cuba (CUB) | 8640 pts | Aleksandr Pogorelov; Russia (RUS) | 8528 pts PB |
WR world record | AR area record | CR championship record | GR games record | NR national record | OR Olympic record | PB personal best | SB season best | WL world leading (in a given season)

- Initially, Russian decathlete Aleksandr Pogorelov won the bronze medal, but later he was disqualified for doping.

== Women's results ==
=== Track ===
Chronology: 2005 | 2007 | 2009 | 2011 | 2013

| Event | Gold | | Silver | | Bronze | |
|---|---|---|---|---|---|---|
| 100 metres | Shelly-Ann Fraser; Jamaica (JAM) | 10.73; WL | Kerron Stewart; Jamaica (JAM) | 10.75; PB | Carmelita Jeter; United States (USA) | 10.90 |
| 200 metres | Allyson Felix; United States (USA) | 22.02 | Veronica Campbell Brown; Jamaica (JAM) | 22.35 | Debbie Ferguson-McKenzie; Bahamas (BAH) | 22.41 |
| 400 metres | Sanya Richards; United States (USA) | 49.00; WL | Shericka Williams; Jamaica (JAM) | 49.32; PB | Antonina Krivoshapka; Russia (RUS) | 49.71 |
| 800 metres | Caster Semenya; South Africa (RSA) | 1:55.45; WL | Janeth Jepkosgei; Kenya (KEN) | 1:57.90; SB | Jenny Meadows; Great Britain & N.I. (GBR) | 1:57.93; PB |
| 1500 metres | Maryam Yusuf Jamal; Bahrain (BHR) | 4:03.74 | Lisa Dobriskey; Great Britain & N.I. (GBR) | 4:03.75 | Shannon Rowbury; United States (USA) | 4:04.18 |
| 1500 metres | Natalia Rodríguez; Spain (ESP) | 4:03.37 | Lisa Dobriskey; Great Britain & N.I. (GBR) | 4:03.75 | Shannon Rowbury; United States (USA) | 4:04.18 |
| 5000 metres | Vivian Cheruiyot; Kenya (KEN) | 14:57.97 | Sylvia Jebiwott Kibet; Kenya (KEN) | 14:58.33 | Meseret Defar; Ethiopia (ETH) | 14:58.41 |
| 10,000 metres | Linet Chepkwemoi Masai; Kenya (KEN) | 30:51.24; SB | Meselech Melkamu; Ethiopia (ETH) | 30:51.34 | Wude Ayalew; Ethiopia (ETH) | 30:51.95 |
| Marathon | Bai Xue; China (CHN) | 2:25:15 | Yoshimi Ozaki; Japan (JPN) | 2:25:25 | Aselefech Mergia; Ethiopia (ETH) | 2:25:32 |
| 100 metres hurdles | Brigitte Foster-Hylton; Jamaica (JAM) | 12.51; SB | Priscilla Lopes-Schliep; Canada (CAN) | 12.54 | Delloreen Ennis-London; Jamaica (JAM) | 12.55; SB |
| 400 metres hurdles | Melaine Walker; Jamaica (JAM) | 52.42; CR | Lashinda Demus; United States (USA) | 52.96 | Josanne Lucas; Trinidad and Tobago (TRI) | 53.20 |
| 3000 metres steeplechase | Yuliya Zarudneva; Russia (RUS) | 9:08.39; PB | Milcah Chemos Cheywa; Kenya (KEN) | 9:08.57; PB | Gulnara Samitova-Galkina; Russia (RUS) | 9:11.09; SB |
| 3000 metres steeplechase | Marta Domínguez; Spain (ESP) | 9:07.32; WL, NR | Milcah Chemos Cheywa; Kenya (KEN) | 9:08.57; PB | Gulnara Samitova-Galkina; Russia (RUS) | 9:11.09; SB |
| 20 kilometres walk | Olive Loughnane; Ireland (IRL) | 1:28:58; SB | Liu Hong; China (CHN) | 1:29:10; SB | Anisya Kirdyapkina; Russia (RUS) | 1:30:09 |
| 20 kilometres walk | Olga Kaniskina; Russia (RUS) | 1:28.09 | Liu Hong; China (CHN) | 1:29:10; SB | Anisya Kirdyapkina; Russia (RUS) | 1:30:09 |
| 4 × 100 metres relay | Jamaica; Simone Facey; Shelly-Ann Fraser; Aleen Bailey; Kerron Stewart | 42.06 | Bahamas; Sheniqua Ferguson; Chandra Sturrup; Christine Amertil; Debbie Ferguson-McKenzie | 42.29; SB | Germany; Marion Wagner; Anne Möllinger; Cathleen Tschirch; Verena Sailer | 42.87; SB |
| 4 × 400 metres relay | United States; Debbie Dunn; Allyson Felix; Lashinda Demus; Sanya Richards; Natasha Hastings*; Jessica Beard* | 3:17.83; WL | Jamaica; Rosemarie Whyte; Novlene Williams-Mills; Shereefa Lloyd; Shericka Williams; Kaliese Spencer* | 3:21.15; SB | Great Britain & N.I. Lee McConnell; Christine Ohuruogu; Vicki Barr; Nicola Sanders; Jenny Meadows* | 3:25.16 |
| 4 × 400 metres relay | United States; Debbie Dunn; Allyson Felix; Lashinda Demus; Sanya Richards; Natasha Hastings*; Jessica Beard* | 3:17.83; WL | Jamaica; Rosemarie Whyte; Novlene Williams-Mills; Shereefa Lloyd; Shericka Williams; Kaliese Spencer* | 3:21.15; SB | Russia; Anastasiya Kapachinskaya; Tatyana Firova; Lyudmila Litvinova; Antonina Krivoshapka; Natalya Nazarova*; Natalya Antyukh* | 3:21.64 |
WR world record | AR area record | CR championship record | GR games record | NR national record | OR Olympic record | PB personal best | SB season best | WL world leading (in a given season)

* Runners who participated in the heats only and received medals

=== Field ===
Chronology: 2005 | 2007 | 2009 | 2011 | 2013

| Event | Gold | | Silver | | Bronze | |
|---|---|---|---|---|---|---|
| High jump | Blanka Vlašić; Croatia (CRO) | 2.04 m | Ariane Friedrich; Germany (GER) | 2.02 m | Antonietta Di Martino; Italy (ITA) | 1.99 m |
| High jump | Blanka Vlašić; Croatia (CRO) | 2.04 m | Anna Chicherova; Russia (RUS) | 2.02 m | Antonietta Di Martino; Italy (ITA) | 1.99 m |
| Pole vault | Anna Rogowska; Poland (POL) | 4.75 m | Monika Pyrek; Poland (POL) Chelsea Johnson; United States (USA) | 4.65 m | Not awarded | |
| Long jump | Brittney Reese; United States (USA) | 7.10 m WL | Karin Mey Melis; Turkey (TUR) | 6.80 m | Naide Gomes; Portugal (POR) | 6.77 m |
| Triple jump | Yargelis Savigne; Cuba (CUB) | 14.95 m | Mabel Gay; Cuba (CUB) | 14.61 m SB | Anna Pyatykh; Russia (RUS) | 14.58 m |
| Shot put | Valerie Vili; New Zealand (NZL) | 20.44 m | Nadine Kleinert; Germany (GER) | 20.20 m PB | Gong Lijiao; China (CHN) | 19.89 m PB |
| Discus throw | Dani Samuels; Australia (AUS) | 65.44 m PB | Yarelis Barrios; Cuba (CUB) | 65.31 m SB | Nicoleta Grasu; Romania (ROU) | 65.20 m SB |
| Javelin throw | Steffi Nerius; Germany (GER) | 67.30 m SB | Barbora Špotáková; Czech Republic (CZE) | 66.42 m | Monica Stoian; Romania (ROU) | 64.51 m PB |
| Javelin throw | Steffi Nerius; Germany (GER) | 67.30 m SB | Barbora Špotáková; Czech Republic (CZE) | 66.42 m | Mariya Abakumova; Russia (RUS) | 66.06 m |
| Hammer throw | Anita Włodarczyk; Poland (POL) | 77.96 m WR | Betty Heidler; Germany (GER) | 77.12 m NR | Martina Hrasnova; Slovakia (SVK) | 74.49 m |
| Heptathlon | Jessica Ennis; Great Britain & N.I. (GBR) | 6731 pts WL | Jennifer Oeser; Germany (GER) | 6493 pts PB | Kamila Chudzik; Poland (POL) | 6471 pts SB |
WR world record | AR area record | CR championship record | GR games record | NR national record | OR Olympic record | PB personal best | SB season best | WL world leading (in a given season)

== Medal table ==
* Host nation (Germany)

| Rank | Nation | Gold | Silver | Bronze | Total |
|---|---|---|---|---|---|
| 1 | United States | 10 | 6 | 6 | 22 |
| 2 | Jamaica | 7 | 4 | 2 | 13 |
| 3 | Kenya | 4 | 6 | 1 | 11 |
| 4 | Germany* | 2 | 4 | 3 | 9 |
| 4 | Poland | 2 | 4 | 3 | 9 |
| 6 | Ethiopia | 2 | 2 | 4 | 8 |
| 7 | Great Britain & N.I. | 2 | 2 | 3 | 7 |
| 8 | China | 2 | 1 | 1 | 4 |
| 9 | South Africa | 2 | 1 | 0 | 3 |
| 10 | Russia | 2 | 0 | 5 | 7 |
| 11 | Australia | 2 | 0 | 2 | 4 |
| 12 | Bahrain | 2 | 0 | 1 | 3 |
| 13 | Norway | 2 | 0 | 0 | 2 |
| 14 | Cuba | 1 | 4 | 1 | 6 |
| 15 | Barbados | 1 | 0 | 0 | 1 |
| 15 | Croatia | 1 | 0 | 0 | 1 |
| 15 | Ireland | 1 | 0 | 0 | 1 |
| 15 | New Zealand | 1 | 0 | 0 | 1 |
| 15 | Slovenia | 1 | 0 | 0 | 1 |
| 20 | France | 0 | 1 | 2 | 3 |
| 20 | Trinidad and Tobago | 0 | 1 | 2 | 3 |
| 22 | Bahamas | 0 | 1 | 1 | 2 |
| 22 | Japan | 0 | 1 | 1 | 2 |
| 22 | Portugal | 0 | 1 | 1 | 2 |
| 25 | Canada | 0 | 1 | 0 | 1 |
| 25 | Cyprus | 0 | 1 | 0 | 1 |
| 25 | Czech Republic | 0 | 1 | 0 | 1 |
| 25 | Eritrea | 0 | 1 | 0 | 1 |
| 25 | Mexico | 0 | 1 | 0 | 1 |
| 25 | Panama | 0 | 1 | 0 | 1 |
| 25 | Puerto Rico | 0 | 1 | 0 | 1 |
| 25 | Spain | 0 | 1 | 0 | 1 |
| 25 | Turkey | 0 | 1 | 0 | 1 |
| 34 | Italy | 0 | 0 | 2 | 2 |
| 34 | Romania | 0 | 0 | 2 | 2 |
| 36 | Estonia | 0 | 0 | 1 | 1 |
| 36 | Qatar | 0 | 0 | 1 | 1 |
| 36 | Slovakia | 0 | 0 | 1 | 1 |
| 36 | Ukraine | 0 | 0 | 1 | 1 |
| Totals (39 entries) | | 47 | 48 | 47 | 142 |

* Number of gold medals for Spain reduced due to disqualification of Marta Domínguez

== Highlights ==
=== Records ===
At the competition, three world records, nine Championship records, eight area records and 57 national records were broken.

=== Day 1 (15th) ===
Valeriy Borchin of Russia won gold in the men's 20 km race walk in a time of 1:18:41, Hao Wang of China won silver and Eder Sanchez of Mexico won bronze. Linet Chepkwemoi Masai of Kenya won gold in the women's 10,000 m in 30:51.24, Meselech Melkamu of Ethiopia won silver and the bronze medal went to Wude Ayalew of Ethiopia. In the men's shot put, Christian Cantwell of the United States won gold with a mark of 22.03m. Tomasz Majewski of Poland took silver and Ralf Bartels of Germany took bronze.

=== Day 2 (16th) ===
In the women's 20 km race walk, the Olympic champion from last years games, Olga Kaniskina, took an expectant win by almost a full minute. In the women's shot put, the Olympic gold medallist from last years games and defending world champion, Valerie Vili, won with a throw of 20.44. In the men's 100 metres dash, Usain Bolt broke his own 100 metres sprint world record with a time of 9.58. The defending world champion, Tyson Gay finished second with a time of 9.71, a US national record. Britain's Jessica Ennis won the heptathlon title with a world-leading points score of 6731.

=== Day 3 (17th) ===
In the men's hammer throw, the Olympic champion Primož Kozmus of Slovenia, pulled off the win with a throw of 80.84 m, which is a seasonal best. Szymon Ziółkowski of Poland achieved a result of 79.30 m earning him a silver medal and the Russian athlete Aleksey Zagornyi earned third place with a throw of 78.09m.

In the men's 10,000 m final, Kenenisa Bekele won with a time of 26:43:31, which is a Championship record. Zersenay Tadese of Eritrea earned the silver medal with a time of 26:50:12 and Moses Ndiema Masai of Kenya took the bronze with a time of 26:57:39.

In women's 100 metres, Shelly-Ann Fraser of Jamaica triumphed with the time of 10.73 s. Kerron Stewart finished second with a time of 10.75s and American Carmelita Jeter took the bronze medal with a time of 10.90 s.

In women's pole vault final, the biggest surprise of the day was the Olympic champion and current world record holder, Yelena Isinbayeva, failing to clear any height. Anna Rogowska of Poland earned the gold with the result of 4.75 m. Monika Pyrek and Chelsea Johnson shared second place with the result of 4.65 m. As a result, for the first time in history of World Championships in Athletics, two Polish athletes took gold and silver medal in the same event. Poland is 16th nation to win gold and silver in the same event in the history of World Championships in Athletics. The previous 15 nations were: Canada, China, Cuba, Ethiopia, Finland, Germany, Great Britain, Jamaica, Kenya, Romania, Russia, Spain, United States and also Soviet Union and East Germany.

In women's triple jump final, Yargelis Savigne won the gold and Mabel Gay took second place. Both of the Cuban athletes did not cross the line of 15m.

In the women's 3000 m steeplechase, Marta Dominguez of Spain won the gold with a time of 9:07:32. Yuliya Zarudneva won the silver and Milcah Chemos Cheywa earned the bronze medal.

=== Day 4 (18th) ===
In men's triple jump, Phillips Idowu of Great Britain, produced a world leading distance of 17.73 m earning him a gold medal. Nelson Évora of Portugal achieved a result of 17.55 m earning him a silver medal and the Cuban athlete Alexis Copello earned third place with a jump of 17.36 m.

=== Day 5 (19th) ===
In the discus final, Robert Harting of Germany won gold in front of a home crowd, trowing 69.43 metres. Piotr Małachowski of Poland and Gerd Kanter of Estonia winning silver and bronze, respectively. Jamaican Brigitte Foster-Hylton ran a season's best of 12.51 in the Women's 100 m hurdles to take gold. Priscilla Lopes-Schliep of Canada (12.54) took silver and Jamaica's Delloreen Ennis-London won bronze.

=== Day 6 (20th) ===
In the men's 200 metres, Usain Bolt broke his own world record with a time of 19.19 seconds. Alonso Edward of Panama won silver with a national record of 19.81. Wallace Spearmon of the USA won bronze, in 19.85. In the women's 400 m hurdles, Melaine Walker of Jamaica won in 52.42 sec, eight hundredths of a second outside Yulia Pechonkina's world record (52.34). Trey Hardee of the USA had won the decathlon, but Leonel Suárez of Cuba reversed positions on Aleksandr Pogorelov in the final event.

=== Day 7 (21st) ===
In the 200 m, Allyson Felix of the USA crossed the line first in 22.02 seconds with double Olympic champion Veronica Campbell Brown from Jamaican coming second with 22.35. In the 400 m men final, LaShawn Merritt and Jeremy Wariner battled it out with Merritt securing gold with 44.06. Wariner ran a season's best of 44.60, winning the silver medal.

=== Day 8 (22nd) ===
In the women's hammer throw, Anita Włodarczyk of Poland won gold medal with a distance of 77.96 m, which is a new world record. Dwight Phillips, USA, won the men's world long jump title for the third time with a jump of 8.54 metres. Phillips received his gold medal from Jesse Owens' granddaughter Marlene Dortch. Godfrey Khotso Mokoena of South Africa won silver (8.47 m). Jamaica's 4 × 100 m relay teams highlighted the day by capturing the gold medal in both disciplines.

=== Day 9 (23rd) ===
Bai Xue of China wins gold in the women's marathon, Kenenisa Bekele of Ethiopia took the 5000 metres world title, and Olympic champion Andreas Thorkildsen of Norway won the men's javelin with a throw of 89.59 metres. Brittney Reese won the women's long jump with 7.10 metres, beating defending champion Tatyana Lebedeva of Russia. In the last two events of the Championships, the United States won both 4 × 400 m relays.

== Participating nations ==
The entry list released on the IAAF Website before the championships contained 2098 athletes from 202 countries and territories. Out of these athletes, a total of 1984 competed (1086 male, and 898 female) at the championships, with 201 of the 213 IAAF National Member Federations represented. The number of athletes competing at the event broke the previous championship record of 1,821 athletes set at the 1999 World Championships in Athletics in Seville. The 100 metres race attracted 100 entries, while the Marathon race listed 101 athletes for competition.

The event was expected to be the largest sports gathering in 2009, continuing in the vein of the World Championships in Athletics being the third largest sports event after the Olympic Games and the FIFA World Cup.

- Afghanistan (2)
- Albania (1)
- Algeria (6)
- American Samoa (2)
- Andorra (2)
- Anguilla (2)
- Antigua and Barbuda (2)
- Argentina (6)
- Armenia (2)
- Australia (38)
- Austria (5)
- Azerbaijan (1)
- Bahamas (15)
- Bahrain (10)
- Bangladesh (1)
- Barbados (4)
- Belarus (26)
- Belgium (23)
- Belize (1)
- Benin (2)
- Bermuda (1)
- Bhutan (1)
- Bolivia (2)
- Bosnia and Herzegovina (1)
- Botswana (5)
- Brazil (30)
- British Virgin Islands (1)
- Brunei (1)
- Bulgaria (11)
- Burkina Faso (2)
- Burundi (2)
- Cambodia (1)
- Cameroon (3)
- Canada (31)
- Cape Verde (2)
- Cayman Islands (2)
- Central African Republic (2)
- Chile (4)
- China (32)
- Chinese Taipei (2)
- Colombia (11)
- Comoros (2)
- Congo (2)
- DR Congo (2)
- Cook Islands (2)
- Costa Rica (3)
- Croatia (5)
- Cuba (34)
- Cyprus (4)
- Czech Republic (22)
- Denmark (3)
- Djibouti (1)
- Dominica (1)
- Dominican Republic (6)
- Ecuador (10)
- Egypt (4)
- El Salvador (2)
- Equatorial Guinea (2)
- Eritrea (8)
- Estonia (18)
- Ethiopia (38)
- Fiji (2)
- Finland (20)
- France (78)
- French Polynesia (2)
- Gabon (2)
- Gambia (2)
- Georgia (2)
- Germany (85)
- Ghana (3)
- Gibraltar (1)
- Great Britain & N.I. (51)
- Greece (21)
- Grenada (6)
- Guatemala (2)
- Guinea (2)
- Guyana (3)
- Haiti (2)
- Honduras (2)
- Hong Kong (1)
- Hungary (12)
- Iceland (2)
- India (6)
- Indonesia (2)
- Iran (2)
- Iraq (2)
- Ireland (17)
- Israel (4)
- Italy (37)
- Ivory Coast (2)
- Jamaica (46)
- Japan (57)
- Jordan (2)
- Kazakhstan (14)
- Kenya (43)
- Kiribati (2)
- Kuwait (2)
- Kyrgyzstan (2)
- Laos (2)
- Latvia (15)
- Lebanon (2)
- Lesotho (2)
- Liberia (3)
- Libya (2)
- Lithuania (15)
- Luxembourg (1)
- Macau (1)
- Macedonia (1)
- Madagascar (2)
- Malawi (2)
- Malaysia (2)
- Maldives (2)
- Mali (2)
- Malta (1)
- Marshall Islands (1)
- Mauritania (2)
- Mauritius (3)
- Mexico (18)
- Federated States of Micronesia (1)
- Moldova (6)
- Monaco (1)
- Mongolia (2)
- Montenegro (2)
- Morocco (22)
- Mozambique (2)
- Myanmar (2)
- Namibia (4)
- Nauru (2)
- Netherlands (11)
- Netherlands Antilles (2)
- New Zealand (16)
- Nicaragua (2)
- Niger (1)
- Nigeria (25)
- Northern Mariana Islands (2)
- North Korea (6)
- Norway (17)
- Oman (1)
- Pakistan (2)
- Palau (2)
- Palestine (2)
- Panama (3)
- Papua New Guinea (2)
- Paraguay (1)
- Peru (4)
- Philippines (2)
- Poland (42)
- Portugal (30)
- Puerto Rico (5)
- Qatar (9)
- Romania (17)
- Russia (106)
- Rwanda (3)
- Saint Kitts and Nevis (7)
- Saint Lucia (1)
- Saint Vincent and the Grenadines (2)
- Samoa (2)
- San Marino (2)
- São Tomé and Príncipe (2)
- Saudi Arabia (12)
- Senegal (4)
- Serbia (9)
- Seychelles (2)
- Sierra Leone (2)
- Singapore (2)
- Slovakia (13)
- Slovenia (13)
- Solomon Islands (2)
- Somalia (1)
- South Africa (24)
- South Korea (19)
- Spain (51)
- Sri Lanka (2)
- Sudan (9)
- Suriname (2)
- Swaziland (2)
- Sweden (23)
- Switzerland (11)
- Syria (2)
- Tajikistan (2)
- Tanzania (10)
- Thailand (1)
- Togo (2)
- Tonga (2)
- Trinidad and Tobago (20)
- Tunisia (5)
- Turkey (12)
- Turkmenistan (2)
- Turks and Caicos Islands (1)
- Tuvalu (2)
- Uganda (12)
- Ukraine (54)
- United Arab Emirates (2)
- United States (160)
- U.S. Virgin Islands (2)
- Uruguay (3)
- Uzbekistan (6)
- Vanuatu (2)
- Venezuela (2)
- Vietnam (2)
- Zambia (5)
- Zimbabwe (6)
