= Amy Cashin =

Australian athlete (born 1994)

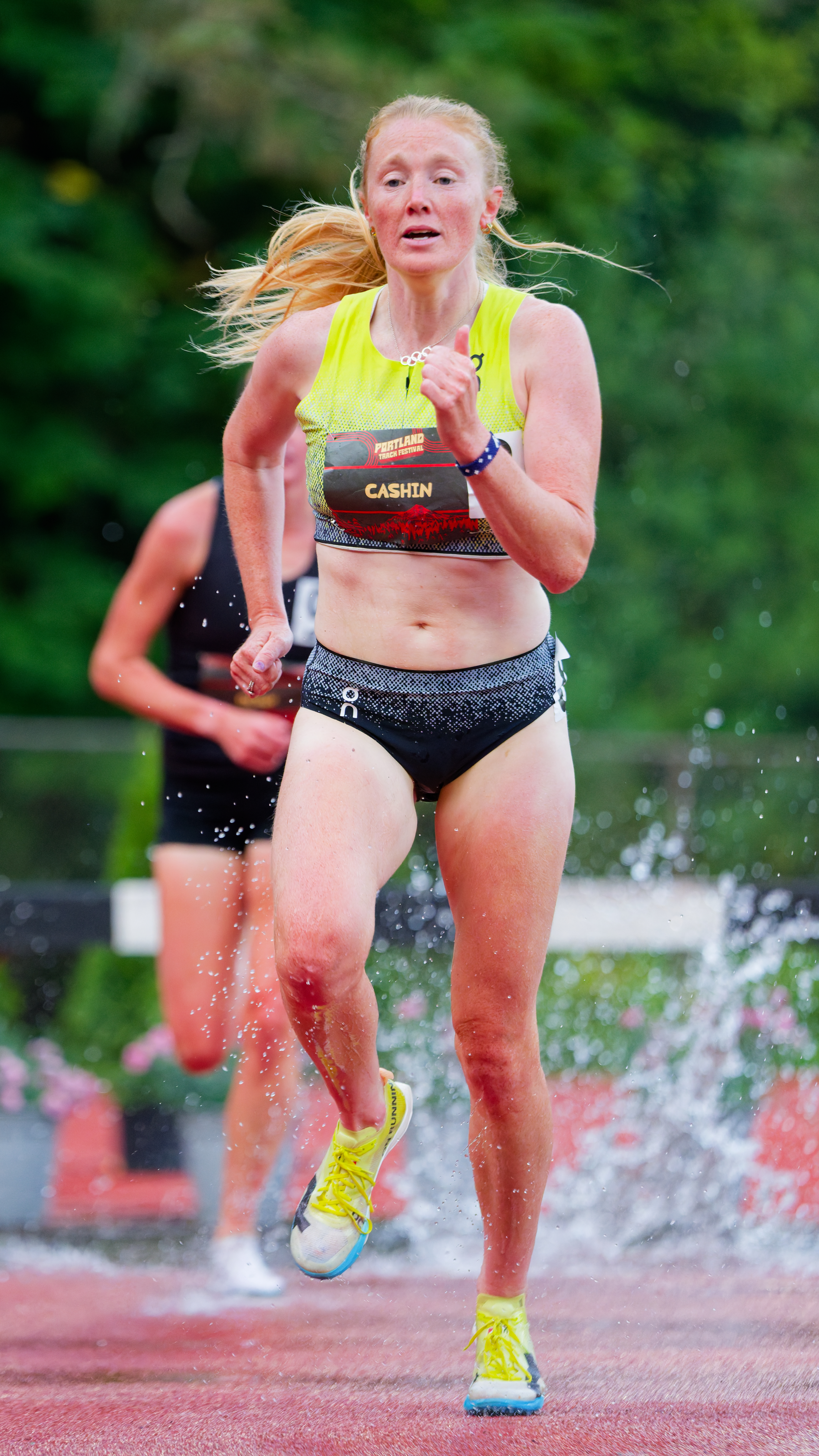
- Cashin in 2025

Personal information
- Born: 28 July 1994 (age 31) East Melbourne, Victoria, Australia
- Height: 1.68 m (5 ft 6 in)

Sport
- Sport: Track and Field
- Event: 3000m steeplechase
Medal record
Women's athletics
Representing Australia
Oceania Championships
Gold medal – first place	2024 Suva	3000 m s'chase

Amy Cashin (born 28 July 1994) is an Australian Olympic athlete.

A steeplechaser from Victoria who studied at West Virginia University, Cashin qualified for the delayed 2020 Tokyo Olympics after competing at the Stumptown Twilight meet in Portland, Oregon, in June 2021; by shaving 15 seconds off of her personal best time in the 3,000-meter steeplechase run, she was given a finishing time of 9:28.60.

Cashin ran the Athletics at the 2020 Summer Olympics – Women's 3000 metres steeplechase where she finished eleventh in heat three in a time of 9:34.67.

She competed in the 3000m steeplechase at the 2023 World Athletics Championships in Budapest.

She won the Australian national championship title in Adelaide on 12 April 2024 in a time of 9:39.53. She competed at the 2024 Summer Olympics in the Women's 3000 metres steeplechase.

She was selected for the Australian team for the 2025 World Athletics Championships in Tokyo, Japan, but did not qualify for the final of the 3000 metres steeplechase.

== Early years ==
In 2013 Cashin was selected in the Australian team for the World Cross Country Championships. She competed in the under-20 race. She left Australia an went to study at West Virginia University. Here during 2013/14 she ran cross country and indoor track. But her 2014 season was cut short when she was concussed after a door shut on her head. After she recovered she ran a few 800m and 1500m races mid-year in 2019.

== Personal life ==
Her brother Liam Cashin is also an athlete who won the gold medal at the 2022 Oceania Athletics Championships in the 3000 metres steeplechase.

== Achievements ==
In 2017 Cashin ran 10:01 in her regional meet and qualified for her first NCAA. In 2018 she achieved across all her distances, 1500m, mile, 3000m, 5000m and steeplechase.

Cashin meanwhile completed her master's degree and commenced a Ph.D. in 2021, focusing on coaches' mental health.

She then seriously concentrated on the steeplechase and ran 9:48. She then ran a PB of 9:43.89 and then 9:28.60 in June which qualified her for the Tokyo 2020 Olympics.
