= Mitchell Watt =

Australian track and field athlete

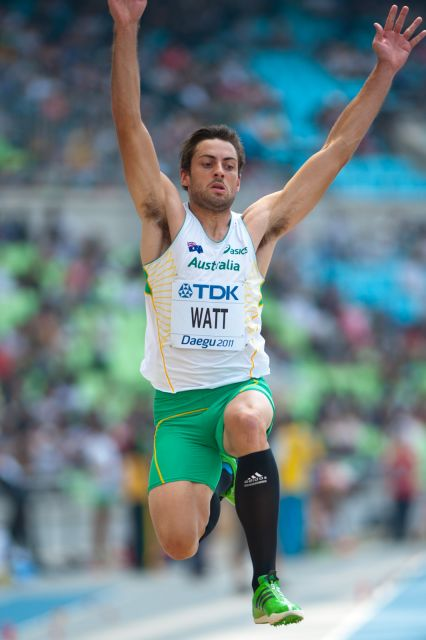
- Watt at the 2011 World championships Athletics in Daegu.

Personal information
- Born: 25 March 1988 (age 38) Bendigo, Victoria, Australia
- Height: 1.84 m (6 ft 1/2 in)
- Weight: 83 kg (183 lb)

Sport
- Country: Australia
- Sport: Athletics
- Event: Long jump

Achievements and titles
- Highest world ranking: World Number 1
- Personal best: 8.54m
Medal record
Olympic Games
Silver medal – second place	2012 London	Long jump
World Championships
Silver medal – second place	2011 Daegu	Long jump
Bronze medal – third place	2009 Berlin	Long jump
World Indoor Championships
Bronze medal – third place	2010 Doha	Long jump
- Updated on 15 August 2012

Mitchell Watt (born 25 March 1988) is an Australian track & field athlete. His main event is the long jump and holds the current Oceania record for the long jump – 8.54m. He was the first ever Australian long jump medalist at a World Championship and was the silver medalist at the 2012 Summer Olympics.

== Childhood ==
Track and Field

Watt started his athletics career as a teenager and first started getting attention as a schoolboy at Brisbane Boys College, a prestigious private high school in Queensland. As a 13-year-old he competed in the GPS 100 m, 200 m, 400 m relay, 100 m relay, long jump, high jump, triple jump, shot put and discus, winning all of his events bar discus with a respectable 4th.

As a junior, he won the All-schools nationals in 1999 (long jump), 2000 (long jump), 2001 (long jump [national record], triple jump [national record] and 100 m).

Rugby Union and Australian Football

Watt took an interest in Australian Football and Rugby Union in his later years of high school. He proved extremely versatile successful in both codes. In Australian Football he won two State Championships during high-school playing as ruckman.

In Rugby Union, he played in the outside backs and was vice-captain of the 1st XV. He was a member of the State team (Queensland Schoolboys squad), a team which several current Australian Wallabies played in.

== Career ==
Long Jump

Watt's first major championship was the 2009 World Championships in Athletics in Berlin where he won a bronze medal with a jump of 8.37. He backed this up with another bronze medal at the 2010 IAAF World Indoor Championships in Doha.

He won the 2011 Australian long jump title with a personal best of 8.44 m, setting a stadium record at the Melbourne Olympic Park Stadium with the final jump of the final competition that was held at the venue.

Watt won silver at the World Championships in Daegu, with a jump of 8.33 m in an interesting competition where the winning jumps were made in the second round of jumping. The top three jumpers failed to improve on their first and second round jumps.

He won the silver medal at the 2012 Summer Olympics.

=== Diamond League ===
Watt was the 2011 Diamond League Trophy winner for the long jump, picking up the $40,000 bonus. He won in Shanghai, London, and also Stockholm where he set the Australian record, and had already secured victory before the Final in Zurich. He is the first and only Australian to ever win a Diamond League Trophy. He also finished the 2011 season with the longest 4 out of 5 jumps in the world.

=== Stadium records ===
Watt currently holds the following stadium/meeting records in the world:

- Shanghai (Shanghai Stadium, China) - 8.44m
- London (Crystal Palace Stadium) - 8.45m
- Rethymno (Vardinoyannia, Greece) - 8.43m
- Melbourne (Olympic Park, Australia) - 8.44m
- New York (Icahn Stadium, United States of America) - 8.16m

== Endorsements ==
Watt has proven popular with global sponsors. He has signed endorsements with Adidas, Powerade, Omega, Mitsubishi and Coles Supermarkets.

== Personal life ==
Watt obtained his double degree in Law / Economics from University of Queensland and now he currently resides in New York where he is a management consultant.
