= Sarah Klein =

Australian long-distance runner

Personal information
- Born: 19 April 1985 (age 41)

Sport
- Country: Australia
- Sport: Track and field
- Event: Marathon

Sarah Klein (born 19 April 1985) is an Australian long-distance runner. She competed in the marathon event at the 2014 Commonwealth Games in Glasgow and the 2015 World Championships in Athletics in Beijing, China.

Klein served a two year competition ban from 2016 to 2018 due to an anti-doping rule violation in relation to failure to provide a testing sample.
