= Tristan Thomas =

Australian hurdler (born 1986)

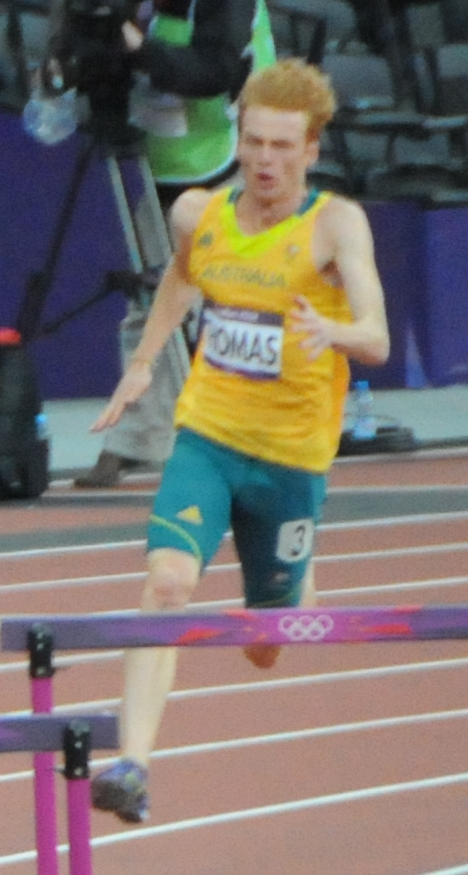
- Tristan Thomas at the 2012 Summer Olympics

Personal information
- Born: 23 May 1986 (age 40)
- Height: 182 cm (5 ft 11 1/2 in)
- Weight: 70 kg (150 lb)

Sport
- Country: Australia
- Sport: Athletics
- Event: 400 m hurdles
Medal record
World Championships
Bronze medal – third place	Berlin 2009	4x400 m relay
Universiade
Silver medal – second place	Bangkok 2007	4x400 m relay
Gold medal – first place	Belgrade 2009	4x400 m relay
Gold medal – first place	Belgrade 2009	400 m hurdles

Tristan Thomas (born 23 May 1986 in Brisbane) is an Australian track and field athlete specialising in the 400 metres hurdles.

Currently coached by Craig Hilliard at the Australian Institute of Sport in Canberra, Thomas has set personal bests over a diverse range of distances and has been nationally ranked over 200 metres, 400 metres, 800 metres and 400m Hurdles in various athletics season in Australia. Thomas is a four-time National Champion of the 400 metres hurdles, the second best Australian of all time in this event and the Tasmanian record holder. Thomas had displayed his ability whilst in school, winning an unprecedented four gold medals in the above events at the 2004 Australian All Schools Championships. He was selected to compete in the 2012 Summer Olympics in London in the 400 metres hurdles. He finished 4th in heat four with a time of 49.13. This qualified him for the semifinals. He finished 7th in semifinal two with a time of 50.55. This did not qualify him for the next stage and this was the end of Thomas's competition. He has also competed in three World Championships (2009, 2011 and 2013), winning bronze in 2009 in the 4 x 400 metres relay. He now currently is a maths teacher. Thomas competed in the 2006 Commonwealth Games but missed the 2010 competition due to injury. He was selected for the 2014 games but withdrew due to injury.

== Education ==
For primary school Tristan Thomas attended Corpus Christi in Hobart, Tasmania. For high school he attended St Virgils also in Hobart. Thomas achieved a Bachelor of Engineering and Commerce at the Australian National University.

== Personal bests ==
Event	Performance	Venue	Date
100m	10.87	Canberra, Australia	1 November 2011
200m	21.32	Melbourne, Australia	14 March 2008
400m	45.86	Canberra, Australia	20 January 2009
800m	1:47.83	Melbourne, Australia	11 December 2008
400m Hurdles	48.68	Osaka, Japan	9 May 2009

== Progression ==
Year	400 metres	400m Hurdles
2004	47.21	51.91
2005	47.11	51.30
2006	46.38	49.88
2007	46.66	-
2008	46.09	49.82
2009	45.86	49.61
2010	–	50.69
2011	46.64	–
2012	–	49.13
2013	49.56	–
2014	49.85	–

== International competitions ==
Year	Competition	Venue	Position	Event	Notes
Representing Australia
2004	Commonwealth Youth Games	Bendigo, Australia	1st	400 m	
2004	Commonwealth Youth Games	Bendigo, Australia	1st	Medley relay	
2006	Commonwealth Games	Melbourne, Australia	11th (sf)	400 m hurdles	50.56
2006	World Cup	Athens, Greece	7th	400 m hurdles	
2006	World Cup	Athens, Greece	8th	4 × 400 m relay	
2009	Universiade	Belgrade, Serbia	1st	400 m hurdles	48.75
2009	Universiade	Belgrade, Serbia	1st	4 × 400 m relay	3:03.67
2009	World Championships	Berlin, Germany	14th (sf)	400 m hurdles	49.76
2009	World Championships	Berlin, Germany	3rd	4 × 400 m relay	3:00.90
2011	World Championships	Daegu, South Korea	10th (h)	4 × 400 m relay	3:01.56
2012	Summer Olympics	London, United Kingdom	21st (sf)	400 m hurdles	50.55
2013	World Championships	Moscow, Russia	18th (sf)	400 m hurdles	49.91
2013	World Championships	Moscow, Russia	8th	4 × 400 m relay	3:02.26
