= John Steffensen =

Australian sprinter (born 1982)

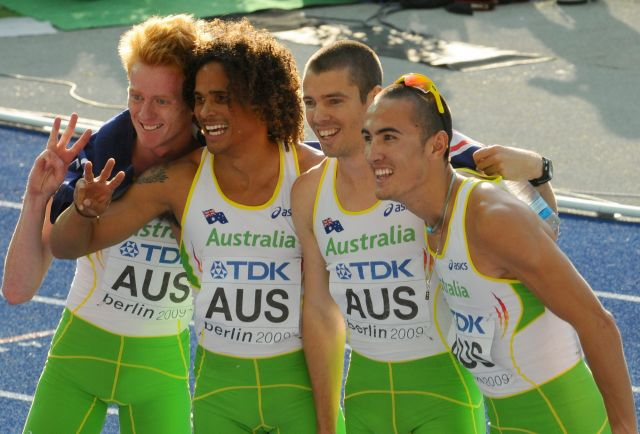
- Steffensen (second from the left) after winning the bronze medal at the 2009 World Championships 4 x 400 m

Personal information
- Born: 30 August 1982 (age 43)
- Height: 180 cm (5 ft 11 in)
- Weight: 71 kg (157 lb)

Sport
- Country: Australia
- Sport: Athletics
- Event: 4 × 400m Relay
Medal record
Olympic Games
Silver medal – second place	2004 Athens	4x400m Relay
World Championships
Bronze medal – third place	Berlin 2009	4x400 m relay
Commonwealth Games
Gold medal – first place	2006 Melbourne	400 m
Gold medal – first place	2006 Melbourne	4 x 400 m Relay

John William Steffensen (born 30 August 1982) is an Australian former track and field athlete, who specialised in 200 and 400 metres. He won silver at the 2004 Olympics in Athens. His personal bests were 20.79 and 44.73.

== Biography ==
Born in Perth, Western Australia, to South African immigrant parents, Steffensen competed in the 2004 Olympics, and was a part of the Australian team that won the silver medal in the 4 × 400 metres relay.

Steffensen won the gold medal in the 400 m at the 2006 Commonwealth Games in Melbourne, with a time of 44.73, setting a new personal best. This has often been referred to as the greatest race of all time. He won a second gold medal as the first runner in the 4 × 400 m Australian relay team at the 2006 Commonwealth Games.

Steffensen boycotted the 2010 Commonwealth Games after a series of disputes with Athletics Australia, which he accused of mismanaging athletes.

Steffensen is an old boy of Trinity College, Perth, and Guildford Grammar School, Perth (92–96).

Steffensen was runner up to Stephanie Rice in the 2013 Australian version of the television program Celebrity Apprentice. Since then, he has been making regular appearances on Nine Network's Wide World of Sports as a co-host.

Steffensen collaborated with Athletics Australia to develop the Nitro Athletics track and field series, which included variations on the traditional one-day athletics meeting with the intention of widening the sport's fanbase.

Steffensen made his first step into motor racing at Sandown in 2017, driving a Porsche 997 GT3 Cup in the Porsche GT3 Cup Challenge series with Zagame Motorsport backed by Repair Management Australia. He finished the championship in eighth and moved immediately into the Porsche Carrera Cup Australia in 2018 driving in the Porsche Centre Melbourne team.
