= 2003 World Championships in Athletics – Women's 100 metres hurdles =

These are the official results of the Women's 100 metres hurdles event at the 2003 IAAF World Championships in Paris, France. There were a total number of 39 participating athletes, with five qualifying heats, three semi-finals and the final held on Wednesday August 27, 2003 at 19:25h.

== Summary ==
In the third heat of the semi-finals, Patricia Girard and Vonette Dixon had a rare, unbreakable tie for the second qualifying spot. Since the Paris track could accommodate 9 runners, this was a rare case where 9 were advanced to the finals.

Running before a home crowd, Girard was marginally first over the first hurdle of the final. She extended the lead over the second hurdle, but by the third, the field had come back. Jenny Adams and Perdita Felicien emerged with the lead. By the fifth hurdle, Felicien was all alone. Glory Alozie, Miesha McKelvy and Brigitte Foster-Hylton had joined Adams in the hunt for silver. By the seventh hurdle, Felicien had a 1-metre lead over McKelvy, slightly ahead of Foster-Hylton. Through the next couple of hurdles, Foster-Hylton got up a head of steam, passing McKelvy and pulling in some of Felicien's lead. Diving for the line early, Foster-Hylton got as close as a foot (30 cm) a couple of metres before the finish, but she was losing balance. Felicien crossed the finish maintaining her speed while Foster-Hylton struggled her last two steps, crashing to the track after the finish. More than a metre back, McKelvy took bronze, still half a metre ahead of Alozie.

== Medalists ==
Gold	Perdita Felicien; Canada (CAN)
Silver	Brigitte Foster; Jamaica (JAM)
Bronze	Miesha McKelvy; United States (USA)

== Final ==
RANK	Lane	FINAL	TIME
	4	Perdita Felicien (CAN)	12.53
	5	Brigitte Foster (JAM)	12.57
	3	Miesha McKelvy (USA)	12.67
4.	1	Glory Alozie (ESP)	12.75
5.	7	Aurelia Trywiańska (POL)	12.75
6.	6	Jenny Adams (USA)	12.77
7.	8	Patricia Girard (FRA)	12.83
8.	9	Lacena Golding-Clarke (JAM)	12.87
9.	2	Vonette Dixon (JAM)	12.87

== Semi-final ==
- Held on Tuesday 2003-08-26

RANK	HEAT 1	TIME
1.	Perdita Felicien (CAN)	12.68
2.	Lacena Golding-Clarke (JAM)	12.84
3.	Gail Devers (USA)	12.87
4.	Natalya Shekhodanova (RUS)	12.91
5.	Yahumara Neyra (CUB)	12.98
6.	Flora Redoumi (GRE)	13.10
7.	Maíla Machado (BRA)	13.34
—	Linda Ferga-Khodadin (FRA)	DQ

RANK	HEAT 2	TIME
1.	Brigitte Foster (JAM)	12.65
2.	Miesha McKelvy (USA)	12.77
3.	Aurelia Trywiańska (POL)	12.79
4.	Glory Alozie (ESP)	12.81
5.	Nadine Faustin (HAI)	13.01
6.	Angela Atede (NGR)	13.18
7.	Su Yiping (CHN)	13.20
8.	Mariya Koroteyeva (RUS)	13.27

RANK	HEAT 3	TIME
1.	Jenny Adams (USA)	12.78
2.	Patricia Girard (FRA)	12.85
2.	Vonette Dixon (JAM)	12.85
4.	Irina Lenskiy (ISR)	12.89
5.	Angela Whyte (CAN)	12.89
6.	Susanna Kallur (SWE)	12.94
7.	Svetlana Laukhova (RUS)	12.98
8.	Carmen Zamfir (ROU)	13.24

== Heats ==
Held on Monday 2003-08-25

RANK	HEAT 1	TIME
1.	Miesha McKelvy (USA)	12.94
2.	Susanna Kallur (SWE)	12.98
3.	Yahumara Neyra (CUB)	13.01
4.	Natalya Shekhodanova (RUS)	13.03
5.	Vonette Dixon (JAM)	13.09
6.	Haïdy Aron (FRA)	13.35
7.	Feng Yun (CHN)	13.50
8.	Céline Laporte (SEY)	14.29

RANK	HEAT 2	TIME
1.	Brigitte Foster (JAM)	12.67
2.	Patricia Girard (FRA)	12.82
3.	Nadine Faustin (HAI)	12.94
4.	Flora Redoumi (GRE)	13.15
5.	Olena Krasovska (UKR)	13.31
6.	Rachel King (GBR)	13.37
7.	Anjanette Kirkland (USA)	13.80
—	Rosa Rakotozafy (MAD)	DNS

RANK	HEAT 3	TIME
1.	Jenny Adams (USA)	12.74
2.	Glory Alozie (ESP)	12.83
3.	Angela Whyte (CAN)	12.99
4.	Angela Atede (NGR)	13.09
5.	Mariya Koroteyeva (RUS)	13.16
6.	Carmen Zamfir (ROU)	13.24
7.	Maíla Machado (BRA)	13.28
8.	Juliane Sprenger (GER)	13.31

RANK	HEAT 4	TIME
1.	Perdita Felicien (CAN)	12.70
2.	Lacena Golding-Clarke (JAM)	12.86
3.	Linda Ferga-Khodadin (FRA)	12.86
4.	Svetlana Laukhova (RUS)	12.92
5.	Su Yiping (CHN)	13.12
6.	Judith Vis (NED)	13.36
7.	Maria-Joëlle Conjungo (CAF)	13.51 (NR)
8.	Derval O'Rourke (IRL)	13.54

RANK	HEAT 5	TIME
1.	Gail Devers (USA)	12.76
2.	Irina Lenskiy (ISR)	12.92
3.	Aurelia Trywiańska (POL)	12.96
4.	Trecia Roberts (THA)	13.29
5.	Nadine Hentschke (GER)	13.33
6.	Yvonne Kanazawa (JPN)	13.54
—	Elke Wölfling (AUT)	DNS

== See also ==
- Athletics at the 2003 Pan American Games – Women's 100 metres hurdles
