= 2001 IAAF World Indoor Championships – Women's 60 metres hurdles =

The women's 60 metres hurdles event at the 2001 IAAF World Indoor Championships was held on March 9.

== Medalists ==
Gold	Silver	Bronze
Anjanette Kirkland; United States	Michelle Freeman; Jamaica	Nicole Ramalalanirina; France

== Results ==
=== Heats ===
First 3 of each heat (Q) and next 4 fastest (q) qualified for the semifinals.

Rank	Heat	Name	Nationality	Time	Notes
1	2	Nicole Ramalalanirina	France	7.93	Q, SB
2	4	Olga Shishigina	Kazakhstan	7.98	Q
3	3	Michelle Freeman	Jamaica	8.03	Q
4	1	Anjanette Kirkland	United States	8.04	Q
5	2	Svetlana Laukhova	Russia	8.05	Q
5	4	Lacena Golding	Jamaica	8.05	Q
7	3	Juliane Sprenger	Germany	8.07	Q
8	3	Bisa Grant	United States	8.07	Q
9	2	Irina Lenskiy	Israel	8.09	Q, NR
10	4	Isabel Abrantes	Portugal	8.13	Q
11	1	Olena Ovcharova-Krasovska	Ukraine	8.14	Q
12	1	Linda Ferga	France	8.16	Q
13	2	Melanie Wilkins	Great Britain	8.19	q, PB
14	2	Yahumara Neyra	Cuba	8.22	q
15	3	Nadine Faustin	Haiti	8.26	q
16	4	Svetlana Gnezdilov	Israel	8.28	q
17	1	Flora Redoumi	Greece	8.29	
18	3	Yvonne Kanazawa	Japan	8.33	SB
19	1	Trecia Roberts	Thailand	8.34	
19	4	Su Yiping	China	8.34	
19	4	Maya Shemchyshena	Ukraine	8.34	
22	1	Rosa Rakotozafy	Madagascar	8.36	
23	2	Sandra Turpin	Portugal	8.38	
24	4	Maria-Joëlle Conjungo	Central African Republic	8.47	
25	3	Sarah Claxton	Great Britain	8.54	
26	1	Francisca Guzmán	Chile	8.85	
	3	Maurren Maggi	Brazil	DQ	FS

=== Semifinals ===
First 4 of each semifinal (Q) qualified directly for the final.

Rank	Heat	Name	Nationality	Time	Notes
1	2	Olga Shishigina	Kazakhstan	7.90	Q
2	1	Nicole Ramalalanirina	France	7.95	Q
2	2	Michelle Freeman	Jamaica	7.95	Q
4	1	Svetlana Laukhova	Russia	7.98	Q, SB
5	1	Anjanette Kirkland	United States	8.00	Q
6	2	Bisa Grant	United States	8.03	Q
7	1	Lacena Golding	Jamaica	8.04	Q
8	1	Irina Lenskiy	Israel	8.07	NR
9	2	Linda Ferga	France	8.08	Q
10	1	Yahumara Neyra	Cuba	8.09	PB
11	2	Juliane Sprenger	Germany	8.13	
12	1	Isabel Abrantes	Portugal	8.14	
13	2	Olena Ovcharova-Krasovska	Ukraine	8.15	
14	1	Nadine Faustin	Haiti	8.24	
15	2	Svetlana Gnezdilov	Israel	8.28	
16	2	Melanie Wilkins	Great Britain	8.30	

=== Final ===
Rank	Lane	Name	Nationality	Time	Notes
1st place, gold medalist(s)	8	Anjanette Kirkland	United States	7.85	PB
2nd place, silver medalist(s)	4	Michelle Freeman	Jamaica	7.92	
3rd place, bronze medalist(s)	6	Nicole Ramalalanirina	France	7.96	
4	5	Olga Shishigina	Kazakhstan	7.96	
5	3	Svetlana Laukhova	Russia	7.99	
6	7	Linda Ferga	France	8.06	
7	1	Bisa Grant	United States	8.09	
8	2	Lacena Golding	Jamaica	8.24	
