= 2001 World Championships in Athletics – Women's 100 metres hurdles =

These are the official results of the Women's 100 metres hurdles event at the 2001 IAAF World Championships in Edmonton, Canada.

== Medalists ==
Gold	Anjanette Kirkland; United States (USA)
Silver	Gail Devers; United States (USA)
Bronze	Olga Shishigina; Kazakhstan (KAZ)

== Results ==
=== Heats ===
Qualification: First 3 in each heat (Q) and the next 4 fastest (q) advanced to the semifinals.

Rank	Heat	Name	Nationality	Time	Notes
1	1	Anjanette Kirkland	United States	12.69	Q, SB
2	2	Gail Devers	United States	12.72	Q
3	2	Svetla Dimitrova	Bulgaria	12.74	Q, SB
3	3	Susanna Kallur	Sweden	12.74	Q, PB
5	1	Olga Shishigina	Kazakhstan	12.75	Q
6	3	Brigitte Foster	Jamaica	12.79	Q
7	4	Jenny Adams	United States	12.80	Q
8	1	Irina Korotya	Russia	12.87	Q
9	3	Donica Merriman	United States	12.88	Q
10	4	Perdita Felicien	Canada	12.89	Q
11	2	Linda Ferga	France	12.91	Q
12	1	Nicole Ramalalanirina	France	12.94	q, SB
12	2	Dionne Rose-Henley	Jamaica	12.91	q, SB
14	2	Svetlana Laukhova	Russia	13.00	q
15	4	Vonette Dixon	Jamaica	13.03	Q
16	4	Patricia Girard	France	13.11	q
17	3	Kirsten Bolm	Germany	13.13	
18	1	Nadine Faustin	Haiti	13.15	
19	3	Maurren Maggi	Brazil	13.16	
20	4	Irina Lenskiy	Israel	13.20	
21	3	Sriyani Kulawansa-Fonseca	Sri Lanka	13.23	SB
22	1	Rosa Rakotozafy	Madagascar	13.24	
23	2	Trecia Roberts	Thailand	13.27	
24	2	Svetlana Gnedzdilov	Israel	13.28	
25	1	Olena Krasovska	Ukraine	13.30	
26	4	Feng Yun	China	13.35	
27	3	Angela Whyte	Canada	13.38	
28	4	Gergana Stoyanova	Bulgaria	13.48	
29	3	Natalya Shekhodanova	Russia	13.84	
	2	Maria-Joëlle Conjungo	Central African Republic	DNS	

=== Semifinals ===
Qualification: First 4 in each semifinal qualified directly (Q) for the final.

Rank	Heat	Name	Nationality	Time	Notes
1	2	Gail Devers	United States	12.56	Q, WL
2	1	Svetla Dimitrova	Bulgaria	12.65	Q, SB
3	1	Jenny Adams	United States	12.67	Q, PB
3	2	Linda Ferga	France	12.67	Q, PB
5	2	Olga Shishigina	Kazakhstan	12.75	Q
6	2	Dionne Rose-Henley	Jamaica	12.77	Q, SB
7	2	Brigitte Foster	Jamaica	12.78	
8	1	Anjanette Kirkland	United States	12.80	Q
9	1	Vonette Dixon	Jamaica	12.87	Q
10	2	Susanna Kallur	Sweden	12.85	
11	1	Perdita Felicien	Canada	12.90	
12	1	Nicole Ramalalanirina	France	12.91	SB
13	1	Irina Korotya	Russia	13.02	
14	1	Patricia Girard	France	13.17	
15	2	Donica Merriman	United States	17.17	
	2	Svetlana Laukhova	Russia	DQ	Doping

=== Final ===
Wind: 2 m/s

Rank	Lane	Name	Nationality	React	Time	Notes
1st place, gold medalist(s)	1	Anjanette Kirkland	United States	0.123	12.42	WL
2nd place, silver medalist(s)	6	Gail Devers	United States	0.136	12.54	SB
3rd place, bronze medalist(s)	8	Olga Shishigina	Kazakhstan	0.137	12.58	SB
4	3	Svetla Dimitrova	Bulgaria	0.153	12.58	SB
5	4	Jenny Adams	United States	0.148	12.63	PB
6	2	Dionne Rose-Henley	Jamaica	0.131	12.79	
7	5	Linda Ferga	France	0.196	12.80	
8	7	Vonette Dixon	Jamaica	0.140	13.02	
