= 1999 World Championships in Athletics – Women's 100 metres hurdles =

These are the official results of the Women's 110 metres hurdles event at the 1999 IAAF World Championships in Seville, Spain. There were a total number of 42 participating athletes, with six qualifying heats, four quarter-finals, two semi-finals and the final held on Saturday August 28, 1999, at 20:05h.

== Medalists ==
Gold	Gail Devers; United States (USA)
Silver	Glory Alozie; Nigeria (NGR)
Bronze	Ludmila Engquist; Sweden (SWE)

== Final ==
RANK	FINAL	TIME
	Gail Devers (USA)	12.37
	Glory Alozie (NGR)	12.44
	Ludmila Engquist (SWE)	12.47
4.	Olga Shishigina (KAZ)	12.51
5.	Svetla Dimitrova (BUL)	12.75
6.	Dionne Rose (JAM)	12.80
7.	Delloreen Ennis-London (JAM)	12.87
8.	Patricia Girard (FRA)	12.97

== Semi-final ==
- Held on Friday 1999-08-27

RANK	HEAT 1	TIME
1.	Ludmila Engquist (SWE)	12.50
2.	Glory Alozie (NGR)	12.61
3.	Patricia Girard (FRA)	12.76
4.	Delloreen Ennis-London (JAM)	12.81
5.	Trecia Roberts (THA)	12.83 (NR)
6.	Svetlana Laukhova (RUS)	12.86
7.	Yuliya Filippova-Graudyn (RUS)	12.95
8.	Feng Yun (CHN)	12.98

RANK	HEAT 2	TIME
1.	Gail Devers (USA)	12.70
2.	Olga Shishigina (KAZ)	12.75
3.	Dionne Rose (JAM)	12.79
4.	Svetla Dimitrova (BUL)	12.79
5.	Aliuska López (CUB)	12.83
6.	Irina Korotya (RUS)	12.86
7.	Nicole Ramalalanirina (FRA)	12.96
8.	Sriyani Kulawansa-Fonseca (SRI)	12.98

== Quarter-finals ==
- Held on Thursday 1999-08-26

RANK	HEAT 1	TIME
1.	Olga Shishigina (KAZ)	12.75
2.	Dionne Rose (JAM)	12.90
3.	Sriyani Kulawansa-Fonseca (SRI)	12.97
4.	Nicole Ramalalanirina (FRA)	13.04
5.	Keri Maddox (GBR)	13.21
6.	Andria King (USA)	13.31
7.	Nadine Faustin (HAI)	13.32
8.	Anita Trumpe (LAT)	13.43

RANK	HEAT 2	TIME
1.	Glory Alozie (NGR)	12.60
2.	Svetla Dimitrova (BUL)	12.72
3.	Irina Korotya (RUS)	12.82
4.	Aliuska López (CUB)	12.85
5.	Keturah Anderson (CAN)	12.96
6.	Miesha McKelvy (USA)	12.98
7.	Maurren Higa Maggi (BRA)	13.10
8.	Gillian Russell (JAM)	13.12

RANK	HEAT 3	TIME
1.	Gail Devers (USA)	12.53
2.	Patricia Girard (FRA)	12.78
3.	Delloreen Ennis-London (JAM)	12.80
4.	Yuliya Filippova-Graudyn (RUS)	12.94
5.	Angela Atede (NGR)	12.98
6.	Diane Allahgreen (GBR)	12.99
7.	Zhanna Gurbanova (BLR)	13.31
8.	Yvonne Kanazawa (JPN)	13.33

RANK	HEAT 4	TIME
1.	Ludmila Engquist (SWE)	12.65
2.	Feng Yun (CHN)	12.85
3.	Trecia Roberts (THA)	12.94
4.	Svetlana Laukhova (RUS)	12.95
5.	Rosa Rakotozafy (MAD)	12.98
6.	Eunice Barber (FRA)	13.09
7.	Kirsten Bolm (GER)	13.11
8.	Manuela Bosco (FIN)	13.43

== Heats ==
- Held on Wednesday 1999-08-25

RANK	HEAT 1	TIME
1.	Delloreen Ennis-London (JAM)	12.82
2.	Feng Yun (CHN)	12.85
3.	Yuliya Filippova-Graudyn (RUS)	12.94
4.	Patricia Girard (FRA)	12.99
5.	Nerea Azkárate (ESP)	13.35
6.	Bích Hường Vũ (VIE)	13.36 (NR)
7.	Verónica de Paoli (ARG)	13.58

RANK	HEAT 2	TIME
1.	Gail Devers (USA)	12.80
2.	Nicole Ramalalanirina (FRA)	12.91
3.	Angela Atede (NGR)	12.95
4.	Gillian Russell (JAM)	13.10
5.	Maurren Higa Maggi (BRA)	13.14
6.	Chan Sau Ying (HKG)	13.54
7.	Laureta Derhemi (ALB)	15.20

RANK	HEAT 3	TIME
1.	Sriyani Kulawansa-Fonseca (SRI)	12.94
2.	Dionne Rose (JAM)	12.96
3.	Svetlana Laukhova (RUS)	12.98
4.	Andria King (USA)	13.13
5.	Nadine Faustin (HAI)	13.14
6.	Keturah Anderson (CAN)	13.31
7.	Svetlana Gendzilov (ISR)	13.47

RANK	HEAT 4	TIME
1.	Glory Alozie (NGR)	12.67
2.	Trecia Roberts (THA)	12.88
3.	Miesha McKelvy (USA)	12.95
4.	Keri Maddox (GBR)	12.95
5.	Kirsten Bolm (GER)	13.04
6.	Manuela Bosco (FIN)	13.34
7.	Carine Cresto (MON)	15.75

RANK	HEAT 5	TIME
1.	Olga Shishigina (KAZ)	12.70
2.	Irina Korotya (RUS)	12.89
3.	Rosa Rakotozafy (MAD)	13.02
4.	Diane Allahgreen (GBR)	13.11
5.	Zhanna Gurbanova (BLR)	13.23
6.	Anita Trumpe (LAT)	13.30
7.	Maria-Joëlle Conjungo (CAF)	13.89

RANK	HEAT 6	TIME
1.	Ludmila Engquist (SWE)	12.62
2.	Svetla Dimitrova (BUL)	12.64
3.	Aliuska López (CUB)	13.08
4.	Eunice Barber (FRA)	13.21
5.	Yvonne Kanazawa (JPN)	13.25
	Urša Beti (SLO)	DNF
	Susan Smith-Walsh (IRL)	DNS
