= Athletics at the 1998 Asian Games – Women's 100 metres hurdles =

Women's 100 metres hurdles at the 1998 Asian Games
- Venue: Thammasat Stadium
- Dates: 19 December 1998
- Competitors: 8 from 7 nations

Medalists
gold medal	Olga Shishigina	Kazakhstan
silver medal	Liu Jing	China
bronze medal	Sriyani Kulawansa	Sri Lanka

The women's 100 metres hurdles competition at the 1998 Asian Games in Bangkok, Thailand was held on 19 December at the Thammasat Stadium.

== Schedule ==
All times are Indochina Time (UTC+07:00)

Date	Time	Event
Saturday, 19 December 1998	15:20	Final

== Results ==
- Wind: −0.6 m/s

Rank	Athlete	Time	Notes
1st place, gold medalist(s)	Olga Shishigina (KAZ)	12.63	GR
2nd place, silver medalist(s)	Liu Jing (CHN)	12.89	
3rd place, bronze medalist(s)	Sriyani Kulawansa (SRI)	13.08	
4	Deng Xiaocen (CHN)	13.16	
5	Yvonne Kanazawa (JPN)	13.42	
6	Chan Sau Ying (HKG)	13.52	
7	Vũ Bích Hường (VIE)	13.72	
8	Oksana Samoylenko (UZB)	13.92	
