= Athletics at the 2003 Pan American Games – Women's 100 metres hurdles =

Women's 100 metres hurdles at the Pan American Games

The final of the Women's 100 metres Hurdles event at the 2003 Pan American Games took place on Saturday August 9, 2003, with the heats staged a day earlier. Jamaica's Brigitte Foster-Hylton set a new Pan Am Games record in the qualifying heats: 12.66.

== Medalists ==
Gold	Brigitte Foster-Hylton; Jamaica
Silver	Perdita Felicien; Canada
Bronze	Lacena Golding-Clarke; Jamaica

== Records ==
World Record	Yordanka Donkova (BUL)	12.21 s	August 21, 1988	Stara Zagora, Bulgaria
Pan Am Record	Aliuska López (CUB)	12.76 s	July 30, 1999	Winnipeg, Canada

== Results ==
Rank	Athlete	Heats		Final
Rank	Athlete	Time	Rank	Time
1	Brigitte Foster-Hylton (JAM)	12.66	1	12.67
2	Perdita Felicien (CAN)	12.84	7	12.70
3	Lacena Golding-Clarke (JAM)	12.76	2	12.79
4	Michelle Perry (USA)	12.80	4	12.80
5	Angela Whyte (CAN)	12.78	3	12.94
6	Yahumara Neyra (CUB)	12.82	5	12.95
7	Nadine Faustin-Parker (HAI)	12.83	6	12.95
8	Anay Tejeda (CUB)	12.99	8	13.20
9	Maíla Machado (BRA)	13.17	9	
10	Yolanda McCray (USA)	13.37	10	
11	Princesa Oliveros (COL)	13.80	11	
12	Francisca Guzmán (CHI)	14.04	12	
13	Patricia Riesco (PER)	14.05	13	
14	Juana Mejía (DOM)	14.17	14	

== See also ==
- 2003 World Championships in Athletics – Women's 100 metres hurdles
- Athletics at the 2004 Summer Olympics – Women's 100 metre hurdles
