= 2004 IAAF World Indoor Championships – Women's 60 metres hurdles =

The Women's 60 metres hurdles event at the 2004 IAAF World Indoor Championships was held on March 7.

== Medalists ==
Gold	Silver	Bronze
Perdita Felicien; Canada	Gail Devers; United States	Linda Ferga-Khodadin; France

== Results ==
=== Heat ===
First 3 of each heat (Q) and next 4 fastest (q) qualified for the semifinals.

Rank	Heat	Name	Nationality	Time	Notes
1	3	Gail Devers	United States	7.88	Q
2	1	Lacena Golding-Clarke	Jamaica	7.90	Q
3	1	Linda Ferga-Khodadin	France	7.91	Q, SB
3	2	Perdita Felicien	Canada	7.91	Q
3	4	Susanna Kallur	Sweden	7.91	Q
6	3	Nicole Ramalalanirina	France	7.93	Q, SB
7	3	Carmen Zamfir-Ghilase	Romania	7.96	Q, PB
8	4	Delloreen Ennis-London	Jamaica	8.00	Q
9	1	Aliuska López	Spain	8.01	Q, SB
9	2	Joanna Hayes	United States	8.01	Q
11	1	Jenny Kallur	Sweden	8.02	q, PB
11	4	Irina Shevchenko	Russia	8.02	Q, PB
13	1	Flora Redoumi	Greece	8.05	q
13	3	Juliane Sprenger-Afflerbach	Germany	8.05	q
13	4	Anay Tejeda	Cuba	8.05	q
16	2	Natalia Rusakova	Russia	8.06	Q
17	3	Dainelky Pérez	Cuba	8.08	
17	4	Glory Alozie	Spain	8.08	
19	2	Nadine Faustin-Parker	Haiti	8.14	
20	4	Sarah Claxton	Great Britain	8.15	
21	1	Angela Whyte	Canada	8.17	
22	3	Edit Vári	Hungary	8.24	
23	2	Evaggelía Nesoudi	Greece	8.27	
23	3	Yauhenia Valadzko	Belarus	8.27	
25	2	Lucie Škrobáková	Czech Republic	8.29	

=== Semifinals ===
First 4 of each semifinal (Q) qualified directly for the final.

Rank	Heat	Name	Nationality	Time	Notes
1	1	Perdita Felicien	Canada	7.83	Q, NR
2	1	Joanna Hayes	United States	7.83	Q, PB
3	1	Lacena Golding-Clarke	Jamaica	7.86	Q, PB
4	2	Gail Devers	United States	7.88	Q
5	2	Flora Redoumi	Greece	7.91	Q, NR
6	2	Susanna Kallur	Sweden	7.92	Q
7	2	Linda Ferga-Khodadin	France	7.92	Q
8	2	Delloreen Ennis-London	Jamaica	7.97	
9	1	Nicole Ramalalanirina	France	7.98	Q
10	2	Natalia Rusakova	Russia	8.01	
11	2	Carmen Zamfir-Ghilase	Romania	8.02	
12	1	Jenny Kallur	Sweden	8.03	
13	2	Juliane Sprenger-Afflerbach	Germany	8.05	
14	1	Anay Tejeda	Cuba	8.18	
15	1	Irina Shevchenko	Russia	8.35	
	1	Aliuska López	Spain	DNF	

=== Final ===
Rank	Lane	Name	Nationality	Time	React	Notes
1st place, gold medalist(s)	5	Perdita Felicien	Canada	7.75	0.138	CR, NR
2nd place, silver medalist(s)	6	Gail Devers	United States	7.78	0.128	
3rd place, bronze medalist(s)	1	Linda Ferga-Khodadin	France	7.82	0.172	=NR
4	3	Joanna Hayes	United States	7.86	0.144	
5	7	Susanna Kallur	Sweden	7.89	0.168	
6	8	Lacena Golding-Clarke	Jamaica	7.89	0.151	
7	4	Flora Redoumi	Greece	7.94	0.188	
8	2	Nicole Ramalalanirina	France	8.01	0.156	
