= 2000 European Athletics Indoor Championships – Women's 60 metres hurdles =

The women's 60 metres hurdles event at the 2000 European Athletics Indoor Championships was held on February 26.

== Medalists ==
Gold	Silver	Bronze
Linda Ferga; France	Patricia Girard; France	Olena Krasovska; Ukraine

== Results ==
First 2 of each heat (Q) and the next 2 fastest (q) qualified for the final.

Rank	Heat	Name	Nationality	Time	Notes
1	3	Diane Allahgreen	Great Britain	7.99	Q, NR
2	1	Patricia Girard	France	8.03	Q
3	3	Linda Ferga	France	8.08	Q
4	2	Yuliya Graudyn	Russia	8.09	Q
5	3	Susanna Kallur	Sweden	8.10	q, PB
6	1	Olena Krasovska	Ukraine	8.16	Q
7	1	Elke Wölfling	Austria	8.18	q, PB
8	2	Juliane Sprenger	Germany	8.21	Q
9	3	Margaret Macchiut	Italy	8.22	
10	1	María José Mardomingo	Spain	8.24	
10	2	Natacha Casy	France	8.24	
12	2	Manuela Bosco	Finland	8.27	
13	1	Gudrun Arnardóttir	Iceland	8.31	=NR
14	2	Nadine Grouwels	Belgium	8.39	SB
15	2	Irina Lenskiy	Israel	8.40	
15	3	Maryline Troonen	Belgium	8.40	
17	3	Svetlana Ganzdilov	Israel	8.52	

=== Final ===
Rank	Name	Nationality	Reaction	Time	Notes
1st place, gold medalist(s)	Linda Ferga	France	0.146	7.88	PB
2nd place, silver medalist(s)	Patricia Girard	France	0.117	7.98	
3rd place, bronze medalist(s)	Olena Krasovska	Ukraine	0.128	8.03	PB
4	Yuliya Graudyn	Russia	0.115	8.03	
5	Diane Allahgreen	Great Britain	0.147	8.04	
6	Susanna Kallur	Sweden	0.174	8.19	
7	Elke Wölfling	Austria	0.138	8.19	
8	Juliane Sprenger	Germany	0.116	8.32	
