= Athletics at the 2006 Asian Games – Women's 100 metres hurdles =

Women's 100 metres hurdles at the 2006 Asian Games
- Venue: Khalifa International Stadium
- Dates: 10 December 2006
- Competitors: 8 from 6 nations

Medalists
gold medal	Liu Jing	China
silver medal	Feng Yun	China
bronze medal	Lee Yeon-kyung	South Korea

The women's 100 metres hurdles competition at the 2006 Asian Games in Doha, Qatar was held on 10 December 2006 at the Khalifa International Stadium.

== Schedule ==
All times are Arabia Standard Time (UTC+03:00)

Date	Time	Event
Sunday, 10 December 2006	16:00	Final

== Records ==
Prior to this competition, the existing world, Asian and Games records were as follows.

World Record	Yordanka Donkova (BUL)	12.21	Stara Zagora, Bulgaria	20 August 1988
Asian Record	Olga Shishigina (KAZ)	12.44	Lucerne, Switzerland	27 June 1995
Games Record	Olga Shishigina (KAZ)	12.63	Bangkok, Thailand	19 December 1998

== Results ==
- Wind: +1.3 m/s

Rank	Athlete	Time	Notes
1st place, gold medalist(s)	Liu Jing (CHN)	12.93	
2nd place, silver medalist(s)	Feng Yun (CHN)	13.10	
3rd place, bronze medalist(s)	Lee Yeon-kyung (KOR)	13.23	
4	Natalya Ivoninskaya (KAZ)	13.27	
5	Anastassiya Vinogradova (KAZ)	13.30	
6	Trecia Roberts (THA)	13.75	
7	Sumita Rani (BAN)	14.54	
8	Fadwa Al-Bouza (SYR)	14.69	
