= Athletics at the 2002 Asian Games – Women's 100 metres hurdles =

Women's 100 metres hurdles at the 2002 Asian Games
- Venue: Busan Asiad Main Stadium
- Dates: 9–10 October 2002
- Competitors: 11 from 9 nations

Medalists
gold medal	Feng Yun	China
silver medal	Su Yiping	China
bronze medal	Trecia Roberts	Thailand

The women's 100 metres hurdles event at the 2002 Asian Games in Busan, South Korea was held from 9 to 10 October at the Busan Asiad Main Stadium.

== Schedule ==
All times are Korea Standard Time (UTC+09:00)

Date	Time	Event
Wednesday, 9 October 2002	14:50	1st round
Thursday, 10 October 2002	10:30	Final

== Records ==
Prior to this competition, the existing world, Asian and Games records were as follows.

World Record	Yordanka Donkova (BUL)	12.21	Stara Zagora, Bulgaria	20 August 1988
Asian Record	Olga Shishigina (KAZ)	12.44	Lucerne, Switzerland	27 June 1995
Games Record	Olga Shishigina (KAZ)	12.63	Bangkok, Thailand	19 December 1998

== Results ==
Legend

- DNS — Did not start
- DSQ — Disqualified

=== 1st round ===
- Qualification: First 3 in each heat (Q) and the next 2 fastest (q) advance to the final.

==== Heat 1 ====
- Wind: −0.6 m/s

Rank	Athlete	Time	Notes
1	Feng Yun (CHN)	13.06	Q
2	Trecia Roberts (THA)	13.19	Q
3	Yelena Nikitenko (KAZ)	13.73	Q
4	Akiko Morimoto (JPN)	13.74	q
5	Hwang Yun-mi (KOR)	14.25	
—	Sriyani Kulawansa (SRI)	DNS	

==== Heat 2 ====
- Wind: −0.2 m/s

Rank	Athlete	Time	Notes
1	Su Yiping (CHN)	13.31	Q
2	Anuradha Biswal (IND)	13.49	Q
3	Yvonne Kanazawa (JPN)	13.52	Q
4	Moh Siew Wei (MAS)	13.79	q
—	Kaniz Farhana Sammi (BAN)	DSQ	

=== Final ===
- Wind: +0.4 m/s

Rank	Athlete	Time	Notes
1st place, gold medalist(s)	Feng Yun (CHN)	12.96	
2nd place, silver medalist(s)	Su Yiping (CHN)	13.01	
3rd place, bronze medalist(s)	Trecia Roberts (THA)	13.07	
4	Anuradha Biswal (IND)	13.46	
5	Yvonne Kanazawa (JPN)	13.57	
6	Yelena Nikitenko (KAZ)	13.71	
7	Akiko Morimoto (JPN)	13.79	
8	Moh Siew Wei (MAS)	13.81	
