= 2003 Asian Athletics Championships – Women's 100 metres hurdles =

The women's 100 metres hurdles event at the 2003 Asian Athletics Championships was held in Manila, Philippines on September 20–21.

== Medalists ==
Gold	Silver	Bronze
Su Yiping; China	Feng Yun; China	Trecia Roberts; Thailand

== Results ==
=== Heats ===
Wind: Heat 1: +0.3 m/s, Heat 2: +0.4 m/s

Rank	Heat	Name	Nationality	Time	Notes
1	1	Trecia Roberts	Thailand	13.10	Q
2	1	Feng Yun	China	13.26	Q
3	2	Su Yiping	China	13.40	Q
4	2	Sriyani Kulawansa	Sri Lanka	13.53	Q
5	2	Moh Siew Wei	Malaysia	13.65	Q
6	1	Lee Yeon-Kyung	South Korea	13.80	Q
7	1	Ayumi Fujita	Japan	13.83	q
8	2	Yvonne Kanazawa	Japan	14.64	q
9	2	Cheung Man Lo	Hong Kong	14.77	
10	1	Sheena Atilano	Philippines	15.14	SB
11	2	Sumita Rani	Bangladesh	15.26	SB
	2	Albina Sibagatullina	Uzbekistan	DNS	

=== Final ===
Wind: -0.2 m/s

Rank	Name	Nationality	Time	Notes
1st place, gold medalist(s)	Su Yiping	China	13.09	
2nd place, silver medalist(s)	Feng Yun	China	13.25	
3rd place, bronze medalist(s)	Trecia Roberts	Thailand	13.29	
4	Sriyani Kulawansa	Sri Lanka	13.42	
5	Moh Siew Wei	Malaysia	13.50	
6	Ayumi Fujita	Japan	13.83	
7	Lee Yeon-Kyung	South Korea	13.87	
	Yvonne Kanazawa	Japan	DNS	
