= Athletics at the 1998 Commonwealth Games – Women's 100 metres hurdles =

Women's 100 metres hurdles at the Commonwealth Games

The women's 100 metres hurdles event at the 1998 Commonwealth Games was held 20–21 September on National Stadium, Bukit Jalil.

== Medalists ==
Gold	Silver	Bronze
Gillian Russell; Jamaica	Sriyani Kulawansa; Sri Lanka	Keturah Anderson; Canada

== Results ==
=== Heats ===
Qualification: First 3 of each heat (Q) and the next 2 fastest qualified for the final.

Wind:
Heat 1: +0.6 m/s, Heat 2: +0.3 m/s

Rank	Heat	Name	Nationality	Time	Notes
1	1	Gillian Russell	Jamaica	12.85	Q, GR
2	1	Keturah Anderson	Canada	12.87	Q
3	2	Sriyani Kulawansa	Sri Lanka	12.94	Q, SB
4	1	Keri Maddox	England	13.15	Q
5	1	Corien Botha	South Africa	13.19	q
6	2	Lesley Tashlin	Canada	13.19	Q
7	2	Brigitte Foster	Jamaica	13.28	Q
8	2	Debbie Edwards	Australia	13.31	q, PB
9	2	Angela Thorp	England	13.51	
10	1	Rowena Morton	New Zealand	13.67	
11	2	Rachel King	Wales	13.73	
12	1	Liz Fairs	England	13.79	
13	2	Rachel Rogers	Fiji	13.89	

=== Final ===
Wind: -0.2 m/s

Rank	Name	Nationality	Time	Notes
1st place, gold medalist(s)	Gillian Russell	Jamaica	12.70	GR
2nd place, silver medalist(s)	Sriyani Kulawansa	Sri Lanka	12.95	
3rd place, bronze medalist(s)	Keturah Anderson	Canada	13.04	
4	Lesley Tashlin	Canada	13.11	
5	Brigitte Foster	Jamaica	13.19	
6	Keri Maddox	England	13.30	
7	Debbie Edwards	Australia	13.49	
	Corien Botha	South Africa	DQ	
