= Athletics at the 2000 Summer Olympics – Women's 100 metres hurdles =

Women's 100 metres hurdles at the Games of the XXVII Olympiad
- Venue: Stadium Australia
- Date: 25 September 2000 (heats and quarter-finals); 27 September 2000 (semi-finals and finals)
- Competitors: 38 from 22 nations
- Winning time: 12.65

Medalists
1st place, gold medalist(s)		Olga Shishigina; Kazakhstan
2nd place, silver medalist(s)		Glory Alozie; Nigeria
3rd place, bronze medalist(s)		Melissa Morrison; United States

The women's 100 metres hurdles at the 2000 Summer Olympics as part of the athletics programme were held at Stadium Australia on Monday 25 September and Wednesday 27 September 2000.

The top four runners in each of the initial five heats automatically qualified for the second round. The next four fastest runners from across the heats also qualified. Then the top four runners in each of the three heats of the second round qualified for the semi-finals, along with the next four fast runners across the heats. Those 16 runners competed in two heats in the semifinals, with the top four runners from each heat qualifying for the finals.

== Medalists ==
Gold	Olga Shishigina; Kazakhstan
Silver	Glory Alozie; Nigeria
Bronze	Melissa Morrison; United States

== Records ==
World and Olympic records prior to the Games
World Record	12.21	Yordanka Donkova	BUL	Stara Zagora, Bulgaria	20 August 1988
Olympic Record	12.38	Yordanka Donkova	BUL	Seoul, South Korea	30 September 1988

== Results ==
All times shown are in seconds.

- Q denotes qualification by place in heat.
- q denotes qualification by overall place.
- DNS denotes did not start.
- DNF denotes did not finish.
- DQ denotes disqualification.
- NR denotes national record.
- AR denotes area/continental record.
- OR denotes Olympic record.
- WR denotes world record.
- PB denotes personal best.
- SB denotes season best.

== Qualifying heats ==
=== Round 1 ===
Heat 1 of 5 Date: Monday 25 September 2000
Place		Athlete	Nation	Lane	Reaction	Time	Qual.	Record
Heat	Overall	Athlete	Nation	Lane	Reaction	Time	Qual.	Record
1	6	Delloreen Ennis-London	Jamaica	8	0.146 s	12.88 s	Q	
2	7	Linda Ferga	France	6	0.237 s	12.89 s	Q	
3	12T	Svetlana Laukhova	Russia	7	0.184 s	12.98 s	Q	
4	15	Svetla Dimitrova	Bulgaria	4	0.208 s	13.00 s	Q	
5	28	Deborah Edwards	Australia	3	0.175 s	13.24 s		
6	29	Nadiya Bodrova	Ukraine	2	0.201 s	13.25 s		
7	30T	Manuela Bosco	Finland	5	0.162 s	13.51 s		

Heat 2 of 5 Date: Monday 25 September 2000
Place		Athlete	Nation	Lane	Reaction	Time	Qual.	Record
Heat	Overall	Athlete	Nation	Lane	Reaction	Time	Qual.	Record
1	4	Keturah Anderson	Canada	2	0.149 s	12.82 s	Q	SB
2	10	Sharon Couch	United States	3	0.164 s	12.92 s	Q	
3	14	Michelle Freeman	Jamaica	7	0.200 s	12.99 s	Q	
4	16	Angela Atede	Nigeria	1	0.172 s	13.09 s	Q	SB
5	20T	Yvonne Kanazawa	Japan	6	0.192 s	13.13 s	q	
6	22T	Olena Krasovska	Ukraine	4	0.236 s	13.15 s	q	
7	35	Maria-Joëlle Conjungo	Central African Republic	5	0.179 s	13.95 s		
8	38	Verónica de Paoli	Argentina	8		14.61 s		

Heat 3 of 5 Date: Monday 25 September 2000
Place		Athlete	Nation	Lane	Reaction	Time	Qual.	Record
Heat	Overall	Athlete	Nation	Lane	Reaction	Time	Qual.	Record
1	3	Olga Shishigina	Kazakhstan	6	0.203 s	12.81 s	Q	
2	9	Melissa Morrison	United States	1	0.205 s	12.91 s	Q	
3	22T	Natalya Shekhodanova	Russia	3	0.198 s	13.15 s	Q	
4	24	Trecia Roberts	Thailand	7	0.196 s	13.16 s	Q	
5	26	Feng Yun	China	4	0.258 s	13.19 s		
6	32	Vũ Bích Hường	Vietnam	5	0.217 s	13.61 s		
7	34	Rosa Rakotozafy	Madagascar	2	0.211 s	13.89 s		
8	37	Ana Siulolo Liku	Tonga	8	0.196 s	14.58 s		

Heat 4 of 5 Date: Monday 25 September 2000
Place		Athlete	Nation	Lane	Reaction	Time	Qual.	Record
Heat	Overall	Athlete	Nation	Lane	Reaction	Time	Qual.	Record
1	5	Gloria Alozie	Nigeria	2	0.197 s	12.84 s	Q	
2	8	Nicole Ramalalanirina	France	6	0.189 s	12.90 s	Q	
3	11	Aliuska López	Cuba	1	0.179 s	12.97 s	Q	
4	12T	Yuliya Graudyn	Russia	4	0.170 s	12.98 s	Q	
5	18T	Diane Allahgreen	Great Britain	8	0.151 s	13.11 s	q	SB
6	27	Perdita Felicien	Canada	5	0.177 s	13.21 s		
7	33	Anita Trumpe	Latvia	3	0.178 s	13.77 s		
8	36	Naide Gomes	São Tomé and Príncipe	7	0.195 s	14.43 s		

Heat 5 of 5 Date: Monday 25 September 2000
Place		Athlete	Nation	Lane	Reaction	Time	Qual.	Record
Heat	Overall	Athlete	Nation	Lane	Reaction	Time	Qual.	Record
1	1	Gail Devers	United States	3	0.179 s	12.62 s	Q	
2	2	Brigitte Foster	Jamaica	6	0.196 s	12.75 s	Q	
3	17	Sriyani Kulawansa Fonseka	Sri Lanka	7	0.183 s	13.10 s	Q	SB
4	18T	Patricia Girard	France	4	0.190 s	13.11 s	Q	
5	20T	Nadine Faustin	Haiti	8	0.179 s	13.13 s	q	
6	25	Maya Shemichishina	Ukraine	5	0.164 s	13.18 s		
7	30T	Hannah Cooper	Liberia	2	0.181 s	13.51 s		

==== Round 1 – Overall ====
Round 1 Overall Results
Place	Athlete	Nation	Heat	Lane	Place	Time	Qual.	Record
1	Gail Devers	United States	5	3	1	12.62 s	Q	
2	Brigitte Foster	Jamaica	5	6	2	12.75 s	Q	PB
3	Olga Shishigina	Kazakhstan	3	6	1	12.81 s	Q	
4	Keturah Anderson	Canada	2	2	1	12.82 s	Q	SB
5	Gloria Alozie	Nigeria	4	2	1	12.84 s	Q	
6	Delloreen Ennis-London	Jamaica	1	8	1	12.88 s	Q	
7	Linda Ferga	France	1	6	2	12.89 s	Q	
8	Nicole Ramalalanirina	France	4	6	2	12.90 s	Q	
9	Melissa Morrison	United States	3	1	2	12.91 s	Q	
10	Sharon Couch	United States	2	3	2	12.92 s	Q	
11	Aliuska López	Cuba	4	1	3	12.97 s	Q	
12	Yuliya Graudyn	Russia	4	4	3	12.98 s	Q	
12	Svetlana Laukhova	Russia	1	7	3	12.98 s	Q	
14	Michelle Freeman	Jamaica	2	7	3	12.99 s	Q	
15	Svetla Dimitrova	Bulgaria	1	4	4	13.00 s	Q	
16	Angela Atede	Nigeria	2	1	4	13.09 s	Q	SB
17	Sriyani Kulawansa Fonseka	Sri Lanka	5	7	3	13.10 s	Q	
18	Patricia Girard	France	5	4	4	13.11 s	Q	
18	Diane Allahgreen	Great Britain	4	8	5	13.11 s	q	SB
20	Nadine Faustin	Haiti	5	8	5	13.13 s	q	
20	Yvonne Kanazawa	Japan	2	6	5	13.13 s	q	
22	Natalya Shekhodanova	Russia	3	3	3	13.15 s	Q	
22	Olena Krasovska	Ukraine	2	4	6	13.15 s	q	
24	Trecia Roberts	Thailand	3	7	4	13.16 s	Q	
25	Mayya Shemchishena	Ukraine	5	5	6	13.18 s		
26	Feng Yun	China	3	4	5	13.19 s		
27	Perdita Felicien	Canada	4	5	6	13.21 s		
28	Deborah Edwards	Australia	1	3	5	13.24 s		
29	Nadiya Bodrova	Ukraine	1	2	6	13.25 s		
30	Manuela Bosco	Finland	1	5	7	13.51 s		
30	Hannah Cooper	Liberia	5	2	7	13.51 s		
32	Vũ Bích Hường	Vietnam	3	5	6	13.61 s		
33	Anita Trumpe	Latvia	4	3	7	13.77 s		
34	Rosa Rakotozafy	Madagascar	3	2	7	13.80 s		
35	Maria-Joëlle Conjungo	Central African Republic	2	5	7	13.95 s		
36	Naide Gomes	São Tomé and Príncipe	4	7	8	14.43 s		
37	Ana Siulolo Liku	Tonga	3	8	8	14.58 s		
38	Verónica de Paoli	Argentina	2	8	8	14.61 s		

=== Round 2 ===
Heat 1 of 3 Date: Monday 25 September 2000
Place		Athlete	Nation	Lane	Reaction	Time	Qual.	Record
Heat	Overall	Athlete	Nation	Lane	Reaction	Time	Qual.	Record
1	2	Melissa Morrison	United States	3	0.169 s	12.76 s	Q	
2	7	Glory Alozie	Nigeria	6	0.261 s	12.84 s	Q	
3	10	Aliuska López	Cuba	4	0.157 s	12.92 s	Q	
4	11T	Natalya Shekhodanova	Russia	7	0.203 s	12.96 s	Q	
5	20	Nadine Faustin	Haiti	1	0.182 s	13.25 s		
6	21	Patricia Girard	France	8	0.181 s	13.43 s		
7	22	Michelle Freeman	Jamaica	2	0.188 s	13.52 s		
		Katie Anderson	Canada	5	0.141 s	DNF		

Heat 2 of 3 Date: Monday 25 September 2000
Place		Athlete	Nation	Lane	Reaction	Time	Qual.	Record
Heat	Overall	Athlete	Nation	Lane	Reaction	Time	Qual.	Record
1	1	Olga Shishigina	Kazakhstan	4	0.248 s	12.66 s	Q	
2	4	Sharon Couch	United States	5	0.152 s	12.78 s	Q	
3	5	Nicole Ramalalanirina	France	3	0.157 s	12.79 s	Q	
4	6	Delloreen Ennis-London	Jamaica	6	0.185 s	12.80 s	Q	
5	11T	Trecia Roberts	Thailand	1	0.201 s	12.96 s	q	SB
6	16T	Yvonne Kanazawa	Japan	2	0.184 s	13.11 s	q	
7	18	Sriyani Kulawansa Fonseka	Sri Lanka	7	0.179 s	13.19 S		
		Yuliya Graudyn	Russia	8	0.149 s	DNF		

Heat 3 of 3 Date: Monday 25 September 2000
Place		Athlete	Nation	Lane	Reaction	Time	Qual.	Record
Heat	Overall	Athlete	Nation	Lane	Reaction	Time	Qual.	Record
1	3	Gail Devers	United States	6	0.181 s	12.77 s	Q	
2	8T	Linda Ferga	France	3	0.245 s	12.88 s	Q	
3	8T	Brigitte Foster	Jamaica	5	0.189 s	12.88 s	Q	
4	11T	Svetlana Laukhova	Russia	4	0.155 s	12.96 s	Q	SB
5	14	Olena Krasovska	Ukraine	8	0.165 s	13.02 s	q	
6	15	Svetla Dimitrova	Bulgaria	7	0.182 s	13.04 s	q	
7	16T	Angela Atede	Nigeria	1	0.197 s	13.11 S		
8	19	Diane Allahgreen	Great Britain	2	0.158 s	13.22 s		

==== Round 2 – Overall ====
Round 2 Overall Results
Place	Athlete	Nation	Heat	Lane	Place	Time	Qual.	Record
1	Olga Shishigina	Kazakhstan	2	4	1	12.66 s	Q	
2	Melissa Morrison	United States	1	3	1	12.76 s	Q	
3	Gail Devers	United States	3	6	1	12.77 s	Q	
4	Sharon Couch	United States	2	5	2	12.78 s	Q	
5	Nicole Ramalalanirina	France	2	3	3	12.79 s	Q	
6	Delloreen Ennis-London	Jamaica	2	6	4	12.80 s	Q	
7	Gloria Alozie	Nigeria	1	6	2	12.84 s	Q	
8	Linda Ferga	France	3	3	2	12.88 s	Q	
8	Brigitte Foster	Jamaica	3	5	3	12.88 s	Q	
10	Aliuska López	Cuba	1	4	3	12.92 s	Q	
11	Svetlana Laukhova	Russia	3	4	4	12.96 s	Q	SB
11	Natalya Shekhodanova	Russia	1	7	4	12.96 s	Q	
11	Trecia Roberts	Thailand	2	1	5	12.96 s	q	SB
14	Olena Krasovska	Ukraine	3	8	5	13.02 s	q	
15	Svetla Dimitrova	Bulgaria	3	7	6	13.04 s	q	
16	Yvonne Kanazawa	Japan	2	2	6	13.11 s	q	
16	Angela Atede	Nigeria	3	1	7	13.11 s		
18	Sriyani Kulawansa Fonseka	Sri Lanka	2	7	7	13.19 s		
19	Diane Allahgreen	Great Britain	3	2	8	13.22 s		
20	Nadine Faustin	Haiti	1	1	5	13.25 s		
21	Patricia Girard	France	1	8	6	13.43 s		
22	Michelle Freeman	Jamaica	1	2	7	13.52 s		
	Katie Anderson	Canada	1	5		DNF		
	Yuliya Graudyn	Russia	2	8		DNF		

=== Semi-finals ===
Heat 1 of 2 Date: Wednesday 27 September 2000
Place		Athlete	Nation	Lane	Reaction	Time	Qual.	Record
Heat	Overall	Athlete	Nation	Lane	Reaction	Time	Qual.	Record
1	4	Nicole Ramalalanirina	France	6	0.177 s	12.77 s	Q	
2	5	Melissa Morrison	United States	3	0.201 s	12.84 s	Q	
3	6	Linda Ferga	France	4	0.229 s	12.87 s	Q	
4	7T	Delloreen Ennis-London	Jamaica	2	0.166 s	12.90 s	Q	
5	9	Natalya Shekhodanova	Russia	7	0.214 s	12.92 s		
6	10T	Svetla Dimitrova	Bulgaria	1	0.197 s	12.95 s		
7	13	Olena Krasovska	Ukraine	8	0.160 s	13.02 s		
		Gail Devers	United States	5	0.213 s	DNF		

Heat 2 of 2 Date: Wednesday 27 September 2000
Place		Athlete	Nation	Lane	Reaction	Time	Qual.	Record
Heat	Overall	Athlete	Nation	Lane	Reaction	Time	Qual.	Record
1	1	Gloria Alozie	Nigeria	5	0.241 s	12.68 s	Q	
2	2	Brigitte Foster	Jamaica	3	0.205 s	12.70 s	Q	PB
3	3	Olga Shishigina	Kazakhstan	6	0.206 s	12.71 s	Q	
4	7T	Aliuska López	Cuba	2	0.185 s	12.90 s	Q	
5	10T	Svetlana Laukhova	Russia	1	0.169 s	12.95 s		SB
6	12	Sharon Couch	United States	4	0.177 s	13.00 s		
7	14	Trecia Roberts	Thailand	8	0.225 s	13.15 s		
8	15	Yvonne Kanazawa	Japan	7	0.202 s	13.16 s		

==== Semi-finals – overall ====
Semi-Finals Overall Results
Place	Athlete	Nation	Heat	Lane	Place	Time	Qual.	Record
1	Gloria Alozie	Nigeria	2	5	1	12.68 s	Q	
2	Brigitte Foster	Jamaica	2	3	2	12.70 s	Q	PB
3	Olga Shishigina	Kazakhstan	2	6	3	12.71 s	Q	
4	Nicole Ramalalanirina	France	1	6	1	12.77 s	Q	
5	Melissa Morrison	United States	1	3	2	12.84 s	Q	
6	Linda Ferga	France	1	4	3	12.87 s	Q	
7	Delloreen Ennis-London	Jamaica	1	2	4	12.90 s	Q	
7	Aliuska López	Cuba	2	2	4	12.90 s	Q	
9	Natalya Shekhodanova	Russia	1	7	5	12.92 s		
10	Svetla Dimitrova	Bulgaria	1	1	6	12.95 s		
10	Svetlana Laukhova	Russia	2	1	5	12.95 s		SB
12	Sharon Couch	United States	2	4	6	13.00 s		
13	Olena Krasovska	Ukraine	1	8	7	13.02 s		
14	Trecia Roberts	Thailand	2	8	7	13.15 s		
15	Yvonne Kanazawa	Japan	2	7	8	13.16 s		
	Gail Devers	United States	1	5		DNF		

== Finals ==
Heat 1 of 1 Date: Wednesday 27 September 2000
Place	Athlete	Nation	Lane	Reaction	Time	Record
1st place, gold medalist(s)	Olga Shishigina	Kazakhstan	7	0.237 s	12.65 s	
2nd place, silver medalist(s)	Gloria Alozie	Nigeria	3	0.217 s	12.68 s	
3rd place, bronze medalist(s)	Melissa Morrison	United States	6	0.180 s	12.76 s	
4	Delloreen Ennis-London	Jamaica	8	0.156 s	12.80 s	
5	Aliuska López	Cuba	1	0.179 s	12.83 s	
6	Nicole Ramalalanirina	France	4	0.194 s	12.91 s	
7	Linda Ferga	France	2	0.294 s	13.11 s	
8	Brigitte Foster	Jamaica	5	0.217 s	13.49 s	
