= 2003 IAAF World Indoor Championships – Women's 60 metres hurdles =

The women's 60 metres hurdles event at the 2003 IAAF World Indoor Championships was held on March 15–16.

== Medalists ==
Gold	Silver	Bronze
Gail Devers; United States	Glory Alozie; Spain	Melissa Morrison-Howard; United States

== Results ==
=== Heats ===
First 3 of each heat (Q) and next 4 fastest (q) qualified for the semifinals.

Rank	Heat	Name	Nationality	Time	Notes
1	3	Gail Devers	United States	7.92	Q
2	2	Susanna Kallur	Sweden	7.93	Q
3	3	Brigitte Foster-Hylton	Jamaica	7.99	Q
4	1	Patricia Girard	France	8.02	Q
5	1	Lacena Golding-Clarke	Jamaica	8.08	Q
6	2	Linda Ferga-Khodadin	France	8.09	Q
7	4	Melissa Morrison-Howard	United States	8.13	Q
8	4	Glory Alozie	Spain	8.13	Q
9	2	Rosa Rakotozafy	Madagascar	8.14	Q, PB
10	2	Nadine Faustin-Parker	Haiti	8.15	q, SB
11	3	Flora Redoumi	Greece	8.17	Q
12	1	Elke Wölfling	Austria	8.19	Q
13	2	Derval O'Rourke	Ireland	8.20	q
14	1	Yahumara Neyra	Cuba	8.22	q
15	4	Yauhenia Valadzko	Belarus	8.23	Q
16	4	Rachel King	Great Britain	8.23	q
17	1	Edit Vári	Hungary	8.24	
17	3	Feng Yun	China	8.24	q
19	3	Maíla Machado	Brazil	8.29	
20	3	Dainelky Pérez	Cuba	8.30	
20	4	Tetyana Ladovska	Ukraine	8.30	
22	4	Marina Tomić	Slovenia	8.31	
23	2	Sarah Claxton	Great Britain	8.33	
24	1	Yuliya Shabanova	Russia	8.36	
25	1	Andrea Blackett	Barbados	8.37	PB
26	3	Līga Kļaviņa	Latvia	8.47	PB
27	2	Patricia Riesco	Peru	8.78	
28	4	Moh Siew Wei	Malaysia	8.81	

=== Semifinals ===
First 4 of each semifinal qualified (Q) directly for the final.

Rank	Heat	Name	Nationality	Time	Notes
1	2	Gail Devers	United States	7.80	Q
2	2	Glory Alozie	Spain	7.83	Q, NR
3	2	Linda Ferga-Khodadin	France	7.97	Q
4	1	Susanna Kallur	Sweden	7.98	Q
4	2	Brigitte Foster-Hylton	Jamaica	7.98	Q
6	1	Patricia Girard	France	8.00	Q
7	1	Lacena Golding-Clarke	Jamaica	8.01	Q
8	1	Melissa Morrison-Howard	United States	8.05	Q
9	1	Flora Redoumi	Greece	8.12	
10	2	Nadine Faustin-Parker	Haiti	8.15	SB
11	2	Rachel King	Great Britain	8.21	
12	1	Derval O'Rourke	Ireland	8.22	
13	1	Elke Wölfling	Austria	8.26	
14	2	Rosa Rakotozafy	Madagascar	8.27	
15	2	Feng Yun	China	8.36	
16	2	Yauhenia Valadzko	Belarus	8.43	
—N/a	1	Yahumara Neyra	Cuba	DNF	

=== Final ===
Rank	Lane	Name	Nationality	Time	React	Notes
1st place, gold medalist(s)	4	Gail Devers	United States	7.81	0.147	
2nd place, silver medalist(s)	6	Glory Alozie	Spain	7.90	0.149	
3rd place, bronze medalist(s)	2	Melissa Morrison-Howard	United States	7.92	0.146	
4	8	Lacena Golding-Clarke	Jamaica	7.92	0.148	SB
5	7	Linda Ferga-Khodadin	France	7.95	0.173	
6	1	Brigitte Foster-Hylton	Jamaica	7.96	0.134	PB
7	5	Susanna Kallur	Sweden	7.97	0.162	
8	3	Patricia Girard	France	8.02	0.145	
