= 2005 Asian Athletics Championships – Women's 100 metres hurdles =

The women's 100 metres hurdles event at the 2005 Asian Athletics Championships was held in Incheon, South Korea on September 1–2.

== Medalists ==
Gold	Silver	Bronze
Su Yiping; China	Lee Yeon-Kyung; South Korea	Kumiko Imura; Japan

== Results ==
=== Heats ===
Wind: Heat 1: -0.4 m/s, Heat 2: -0.2 m/s

Rank	Heat	Name	Nationality	Time	Notes
1	1	Su Yiping	China	13.27	Q
2	2	Lee Yeon-Kyung	South Korea	13.40	Q
3	2	Kumiko Imura	Japan	13.43	Q
4	1	Mami Ishino	Japan	13.52	Q
5	1	Moh Siew Wei	Malaysia	13.55	Q
6	2	Natalya Ivoninskaya	Kazakhstan	13.61	Q
7	1	Trecia Roberts	Thailand	13.83	q, SB
8	2	Dedeh Erawati	Indonesia	14.00	q
9	1	Nguyen Thi Thanh Hoa	Vietnam	14.28	
10	2	Chung Chiung-Hsuan	Chinese Taipei	14.29	PB
11	1	Fadwa Al-Bouza	Syria	14.58	NJR
12	2	Chai Ee Juang	Singapore	14.81	NR
13	1	Noshee Parveen	Pakistan	16.18	SB

=== Final ===
Wind: +0.4 m/s

Rank	Name	Nationality	Time	Notes
1st place, gold medalist(s)	Su Yiping	China	13.30	
2nd place, silver medalist(s)	Lee Yeon-Kyung	South Korea	13.38	
3rd place, bronze medalist(s)	Kumiko Imura	Japan	13.54	
4	Mami Ishino	Japan	13.56	
5	Natalya Ivoninskaya	Kazakhstan	13.62	
6	Moh Siew Wei	Malaysia	13.70	
7	Dedeh Erawati	Indonesia	14.10	
	Trecia Roberts	Thailand	DNF	
