= Athletics at the 2001 Summer Universiade – Women's 100 metres hurdles =

The women's 100 metres hurdles event at the 2001 Summer Universiade was held at the Workers Stadium in Beijing, China on 27–29 August.

== Medalists ==
Gold	Silver	Bronze
Su Yiping; China	Maurren Maggi; Brazil	Jacquie Munro; Australia

== Results ==
=== Heats ===
Wind:
Heat 1: +0.7 m/s, Heat 2: +1.5 m/s, Heat 3: +1.4 m/s, Heat 4: +1.4 m/s

Rank	Heat	Athlete	Nationality	Time	Notes
1	3	Su Yiping	China	13.09	Q
2	1	Ellakisha Williamson	United States	13.10	Q
3	2	Jacquie Munro	Australia	13.12	Q
4	4	Danielle Carruthers	United States	13.25	Q
5	4	Diane Allahgreen	Great Britain	13.29	Q
6	1	Kirsten Bolm	Germany	13.33	Q
7	3	Reïna-Flor Okori	France	13.34	Q
8	2	Maurren Maggi	Brazil	13.38	Q
8	4	Judith Vis	Netherlands	13.38	Q
10	3	Hristiana Tabaki	Greece	13.40	Q
11	3	Maíla Machado	Brazil	13.41	q
12	2	Princesa Oliveros	Colombia	13.46	Q
13	2	Flora Redoumi	Greece	13.51	q
14	4	Toni-Ann D'Oyley	Jamaica	13.55	q
15	1	Urška Kop	Slovenia	13.61	Q
16	3	Yana Kasova	Bulgaria	13.62	q
17	1	Nathalie Zamboni	Switzerland	13.64	
18	1	Sabrina Previtali	Italy	13.65	
19	1	Myriam Tschomba	Belgium	13.73	
20	2	Katka Jankovič	Slovenia	13.77	
21	3	Adri Vlok	South Africa	13.78	
22	1	Georgina Power	Australia	13.80	
23	4	Derval O'Rourke	Ireland	13.86	
24	2	Veronica Dyer	Canada	14.07	
25	2	Keitha Moseley	Barbados	14.12	
26	3	Esen Kızıldağ	Turkey	14.12	
27	4	Yelena Nikitenko	Kazakhstan	14.18	
28	1	Marida Pretorius	South Africa	14.33	
29	3	Jaanika Meriküll	Estonia	14.37	
30	4	Patricia Riesco	Peru	14.92	
31	3	Sandra Oliveros	Guatemala	15.91	
32	2	Diana Riesco	Peru	15.99	
	2	Yahumara Neyra	Cuba	DNF	
	4	Reina-Flor Okori	France	DNF	
	4	Sonia Paquette	Canada	DNF	

=== Semifinals ===
Wind:
Heat 1: +0.4 m/s, Heat 2: -1.2 m/s

Rank	Heat	Athlete	Nationality	Time	Notes
1	1	Jacquie Munro	Australia	13.15	Q
1	2	Su Yiping	China	13.15	Q
3	2	Danielle Carruthers	United States	13.16	Q
4	1	Ellakisha Williamson	United States	13.21	Q
5	2	Diane Allahgreen	Great Britain	13.32	Q
6	2	Maurren Maggi	Brazil	13.38	Q
7	1	Reïna-Flor Okori	France	13.39	Q
8	1	Maíla Machado	Brazil	13.54	Q
9	1	Kirsten Bolm	Germany	13.55	Q
10	1	Princesa Oliveros	Colombia	13.58	
11	2	Hristiana Tabaki	Greece	13.62	
12	2	Urška Kop	Slovenia	13.81	
13	2	Judith Vis	Netherlands	13.82	
14	2	Yana Kasova	Bulgaria	13.84	
15	1	Flora Redoumi	Greece	13.94	
16	1	Toni-Ann D'Oyley	Jamaica	14.25	

=== Final ===
Wind: -0.1 m/s

Rank	Athlete	Nationality	Time	Notes
1st place, gold medalist(s)	Su Yiping	China	12.95	
2nd place, silver medalist(s)	Maurren Maggi	Brazil	13.13	
3rd place, bronze medalist(s)	Jacquie Munro	Australia	13.17	
4	Diane Allahgreen	Great Britain	13.18	
5	Reïna-Flor Okori	France	13.31	
6	Ellakisha Williamson	United States	13.35	
7	Maíla Machado	Brazil	13.38	
8	Danielle Carruthers	United States	13.53	
