= Athletics at the 1997 Summer Universiade – Women's 100 metres hurdles =

Women's 100 meter dash in Catania, Italy

The women's 100 metres hurdles event at the 1997 Summer Universiade was held on 29 and 30 August at the Stadio Cibali in Catania, Italy.

== Medalists ==
Gold	Silver	Bronze
Angela Atede; Nigeria	Feng Yun; China	Svetlana Laukhova; Russia

== Results ==
=== Heats ===
Wind:
Heat 1: +1.7 m/s, Heat 2: +0.7 m/s, Heat 3: +0.6 m/s, Heat 4: -1.3 m/s

Rank	Heat	Athlete	Nationality	Time	Notes
1	3	Angela Atede	Nigeria	13.01	Q
2	1	Feng Yun	China	13.10	Q
3	3	Sonia Paquette	Canada	13.18	Q
4	2	Anna Leszczyńska	Poland	13.21	Q
5	3	Irina Korotya	Russia	13.27	Q
6	2	Svetlana Laukhova	Russia	13.36	Q
7	4	Diane Allahgreen	Great Britain	13.37	Q
8	1	Maya Shemchyshena	Ukraine	13.42	Q
9	2	Ingeborg Leschnik	Germany	13.45	Q
10	1	Regina Ahlke	Germany	13.46	Q
11	4	Yolanda McCray	United States	13.50	Q
12	1	Kim Carson	United States	13.55	q
12	3	Kertu Tiitso	Estonia	13.55	q
14	3	Simone Purvis	Australia	13.73	q
15	4	Sandra Turpin	Portugal	13.76	Q
16	2	Fan Min-hua	Chinese Taipei	13.95	q
17	1	Katka Jankovič	Slovenia	14.12	
18	2	Jacqueline Tavárez	Mexico	14.22	
19	3	Nathalie Zamboni	Switzerland	14.32	
20	3	Maria-Joëlle Conjungo	Central African Republic	14.51	
21	2	Vaida Ūsaitė	Lithuania	14.55	
22	4	Juliette Kaboré	Burkina Faso	15.79	
23	4	Hoa Nguyen Thi Than	Vietnam	16.18	
24	1	Sandra Oliveros	Guatemala	16.95	
	1	Erica Barani	Italy	DNF	
	4	Martina Stoop	Switzerland	DNF	

=== Semifinals ===
Wind:
Heat 1: +1.0 m/s, Heat 2: +2.4 m/s

Rank	Heat	Athlete	Nationality	Time	Notes
1	1	Angela Atede	Nigeria	12.93	Q
2	2	Feng Yun	China	12.93	Q
3	1	Yolanda McCray	United States	13.04	Q
4	1	Irina Korotya	Russia	13.12	Q
5	1	Sonia Paquette	Canada	13.16	Q
6	2	Svetlana Laukhova	Russia	13.17	Q
7	2	Ingeborg Leschnik	Germany	13.22	Q
8	2	Maya Shemchyshena	Ukraine	13.30	Q
9	1	Diane Allahgreen	Great Britain	13.36	
10	2	Anna Leszczyńska	Poland	13.37	
11	1	Kertu Tiitso	Estonia	13.42	PB
12	1	Regina Ahlke	Germany	13.56	
13	2	Sandra Turpin	Portugal	13.57	
14	2	Simone Purvis	Australia	13.76	
15	1	Fan Min-hua	Chinese Taipei	14.18	
	2	Kim Carson	United States	DNS	

=== Final ===
Wind: -1.1 m/s

Rank	Athlete	Nationality	Time	Notes
1st place, gold medalist(s)	Angela Atede	Nigeria	13.16	
2nd place, silver medalist(s)	Feng Yun	China	13.19	
3rd place, bronze medalist(s)	Svetlana Laukhova	Russia	13.22	
4	Irina Korotya	Russia	13.29	
5	Yolanda McCray	United States	13.51	
6	Maya Shemchyshena	Ukraine	13.54	
7	Ingeborg Leschnik	Germany	13.62	
8	Sonia Paquette	Canada	13.68	
