= Esmé Kamphuis =

Dutch heptathlete and bobsledder

Medal record

Bobsleigh

Representing Netherlands

European Championships
Bronze medal – third place	2011 Winterberg	Two-woman
Bronze medal – third place	2014 Königgsee	Two-woman

Esmé Kamphuis (born 22 May 1983 in Zwolle) is a former Dutch heptathlete, who has competed as a bobsledder since 2004. Her best Bobsleigh World Cup finish was second in the two-woman event at Cesana Pariol in the 2010-11 season. She took a bronze medal at the Bobsleigh European Championships in 2011.

Kamphuis also finished tenth in the two-woman event at the 2008 FIBT World Championships in Altenberg. She competed with Tine Veenstra at the 2010 Winter Olympics, where they finished eighth in the two-woman event.

She qualified for the bobsleigh competition at the 2014 Winter Olympics where she narrowly missed out on a medal by finishing fourth - the best ever result by a Dutch bobsleigh team. Subsequently, in July 2014 she announced her retirement from the sport following the retirement of her brakewoman Judith Vis.
