= Yahumara Neyra =

Cuban hurdler

Personal information
- Born: 18 April 1976 (age 49)

Sport
- Sport: Track and field

Yahumara Neyra Bens (born 18 April 1976) is a retired Cuban athlete who specialised in the 100 metres hurdles. She won several medals on regional level.

She has personal bests of 12.75 seconds in the 100 metres hurdles (Réthimno 2002) and 7.98 seconds in the 60 metres hurdles (Sindelfingen 2001).

== Competition record ==
Year	Competition	Venue	Position	Event	Notes
Representing Cuba
1990	Central American and Caribbean Junior Championships (U17)	Havana, Cuba	2nd	100 m H	14.69
1990	Central American and Caribbean Junior Championships (U17)	Havana, Cuba	2nd	300 m H	42.85
1990	Central American and Caribbean Junior Championships (U17)	Havana, Cuba	2nd	4 × 100 m	46.85
1997	Central American and Caribbean Championships	San Juan, Puerto Rico	3rd	4 × 100 m	44.73
1998	Central American and Caribbean Games	Maracaibo, Venezuela	4th	100 m H	13.24
1999	Universiade	Palma de Mallorca, Spain	6th	100 m H	13.30
1999	Pan American Games	Winnipeg, Canada	6th	100 m H	13.17
2000	Ibero-American Championships	Rio de Janeiro, Brazil	1st	100 m H	13.17
2001	World Indoor Championships	Lisbon, Portugal	10th (sf)	60 m H	8.09
2001	Universiade	Beijing, China	–	100 m H	DNF
2003	World Indoor Championships	Birmingham, United Kingdom	14th (h)	60 m H	8.22
2003	Pan American Games	Santo Domingo, Dom. Rep.	6th	100 m H	12.95
2003	World Championships	Paris, France	15th (sf)	100 m H	12.98
2005	Central American and Caribbean Championships	Nassau, Bahamas	3rd	100 m H	13.09
2005	Central American and Caribbean Championships	Nassau, Bahamas	3rd	4 × 100 m	45.07
