= Moh Siew Wei =

Malaysian hurdler

Personal information
- Nationality: Malaysian
- Born: 30 April 1978 (age 48) Ipoh

Sport
- Sport: Athletics
- Event: 100 metres hurdles

Achievements and titles
- Personal best(s): 13.27 - 100m hurdles, 8.38 - 60m hurdles
- Updated on 28 August 2016

Moh Siew Wei

Chinese name
- Traditional Chinese: 莫曉薇
- Simplified Chinese: 莫晓薇
Transcriptions
Standard Mandarin
- Hanyu Pinyin: Mò Xiǎo Wēi
Hakka
- Pha̍k-fa-sṳ: Mo̍k Hiáu-vì
Yue: Cantonese
- Jyutping: Mok6 Hiu2 Mei4
Southern Min
- Hokkien POJ: Bo̍k Hiáu-bî
- Tâi-lô: Bo̍k Hiáu-bî

Moh Siew Wei (simplified Chinese: 莫晓薇; traditional Chinese: 莫曉薇; pinyin: Mò Xiǎo Wēi; Jyutping: Mok6 Hiu2 Mei4; Pe̍h-ōe-jī: Bo̍k Hiáu-bî; Pha̍k-fa-sṳ: Mo̍k Hiáu-vì; born 30 April 1978 in Ipoh) is a retired Malaysian athlete who specialised in the 100 metres hurdles. She won several medals at the regional level.

She has personal bests of 13.27 seconds in the 100 metres hurdles (Kassel 2004) and 8.38 seconds in the 60 metres hurdles (Karlsruhe 2005). Both are current national records.

She retired from competition in 2008 and married a former pole vaulter, Teh Weng Chang, the same year.

== Competition record ==
| Year | Competition | Venue | Position | Event | Notes |
Representing Malaysia
| 2000 | Asian Championships | Jakarta, Indonesia | 5th | 100 m hurdles | 13.80 |
| 2001 | Southeast Asian Games | Kuala Lumpur, Malaysia | 2nd | 100 m hurdles | 13.43 |
| 2002 | Asian Championships | Colombo, Sri Lanka | 4th | 100 m hurdles | 13.83 |
| 2002 | Asian Games | Busan, South Korea | 8th | 100 m hurdles | 13.81 |
| 2003 | World Indoor Championships | Birmingham, United States | 28th (h) | 60 m hurdles | 8.81 |
| 2003 | Asian Championships | Manila, Philippines | 5th | 100 m hurdles | 13.50 |
| 2003 | Universiade | Daegu, South Korea | 17th (h) | 100 m hurdles | 13.68 |
| 2003 | Southeast Asian Games | Hanoi, Vietnam | 3rd | 100 m hurdles | 13.78 (w) |
| 2005 | Asian Championships | Incheon, South Korea | 6th | 100 m hurdles | 13.70 |
| 2005 | Southeast Asian Games | Malate, Manila | 1st | 100 m hurdles | 13.54 |
| 2006 | Commonwealth Games | Melbourne, Australia | 9th (h) | 100 m hurdles | 13.62 |
| 2007 | Asian Championships | Amman, Jordan | 4th | 100 m hurdles | 13.68 |
| 2007 | Southeast Asian Games | Nakhon Ratchasima, Thailand | 2nd | 100 m hurdles | 13.61 |
