= Linda Ferga =

French hurdler (born 1976)

Linda Ferga married Khodadin (born 24 December 1976 in Paris) is a French former athlete who competed in the 100 metres hurdles and 60 metres hurdles indoor.

== Competitions record ==
Year	Competition	Venue	Position	Event	Notes
Representing France
1995	European Junior Championships	Nyíregyháza, Hungary	3rd	100 m hurdles	13.61
1995	European Junior Championships	Nyíregyháza, Hungary	1st	Long jump	6.56 m
1996	European Indoor Championships	Stockholm, Sweden	14th (q)	Long jump	6.25 m
1997	World Indoor Championships	Paris, France	5th	Long jump	7.95 m
1997	Mediterranean Games	Bari, Italy	2nd	Long jump	6.49 m
1997	World Championships	Athens, Greece	20th (q)	Long jump	6.46 m
1997	Jeux de la Francophonie	Antananarivo, Madagascar	2nd	Long jump	6.29 m
1998	European Indoor Championships	Valencia, Spain	3rd	Long jump	6.67 m
1998	European Championships	Budapest, Hungary	8th	100 m hurdles	13.22
1998	European Championships	Budapest, Hungary	7th	Long jump	6.64 m
1999	World Indoor Championships	Maebashi, Japan	5th	60 m hurdles	7.95
2000	European Indoor Championships	Ghent, Belgium	1st	60 m hurdles	7.88
2000	Olympic Games	Sydney, Australia	7th	100 m hurdles	13.11
2000	Olympic Games	Sydney, Australia	4th	4 × 100 m relay	42.42
2001	World Indoor Championships	Lisbon, Portugal	6th	60 m hurdles	8.06
2001	World Championships	Edmonton, Canada	7th	100 m hurdles	12.80
2002	European Indoor Championships	Vienna, Austria	1st	60 m hurdles	7.96
2002	European Championships	Munich, Germany	13th (sf)	100 m hurdles	13.11
2003	World Indoor Championships	Birmingham, United Kingdom	5th	60 m hurdles	7.95
2003	World Championships	Paris, France	8th (h)	100 m hurdles	12.86
2004	World Indoor Championships	Budapest, Hungary	3rd	60 m hurdles	7.82
2004	Olympic Games	Athens, Greece	18th (h)	100 m hurdles	13.02
2005	European Indoor Championships	Madrid, Spain	15th (sf)	60 m hurdles	7.37
2005	World Championships	Helsinki, Finland	10th (h)	100 m hurdles	12.85

Lina was also Champion of France for the 100 metres hurdles in 2005 (12.66s).

== Bibliography ==
- Evans, Hilary; Gjerde, Arild; Heijmans, Jeroen; Mallon, Bill; et al. "Linda Ferga". Olympics at Sports-Reference.com. Sports Reference LLC. Archived from the original on 2020-04-17.
- Linda Ferga at World Athletics
- FFA profile
