= 1999 IAAF World Indoor Championships – Women's 60 metres hurdles =

The women's 60 metres hurdles event at the 1999 IAAF World Indoor Championships was held on March 5.

== Medalists ==
Gold	Silver	Bronze
Olga Shishigina; Kazakhstan	Glory Alozie; Nigeria	Keturah Anderson; Canada

== Results ==
=== Heats ===
First 2 of each heat (Q) and next 12 fastest (q) qualified for the semifinals.

Rank	Heat	Name	Nationality	Time	Notes
1	3	Olga Shishigina	Kazakhstan	7.89	Q
2	3	Keturah Anderson	Canada	7.90	Q, NR
3	1	Melissa Morrison	United States	7.95	Q
4	1	Glory Alozie	Nigeria	7.98	Q
5	3	Linda Ferga	France	8.00	q
6	2	Brigita Bukovec	Slovenia	8.04	Q
7	2	Irina Korotya	Russia	8.04	Q
8	2	Dionne Rose	Jamaica	8.05	q
9	1	Gillian Russel	Jamaica	8.06	
9	2	Nicole Ramalalanirina	France	8.06	
11	3	Cheryl Dickey	United States	8.07	
12	3	Yvonne Kanazawa	Japan	8.12	NR
13	2	Feng Yun	China	8.14	
14	1	María José Mardomingo	Spain	8.17	SB
15	2	Keri Maddox	Great Britain	8.22	PB
16	2	Anna Leszczyńska-Łazor	Poland	8.22	
17	1	Diane Allahgreen	Great Britain	8.25	SB
18	1	Maryline Troonen	Belgium	8.47	
19	3	Marie-Joelle Conjungo	Central African Republic	8.65	

=== Final ===
Rank	Lane	Name	Nationality	Time	Notes
1st place, gold medalist(s)	6	Olga Shishigina	Kazakhstan	7.86	
2nd place, silver medalist(s)	7	Glory Alozie	Nigeria	7.87	
3rd place, bronze medalist(s)	3	Keturah Anderson	Canada	7.90	=NR
4	4	Brigita Bukovec	Slovenia	7.92	
5	2	Linda Ferga	France	7.95	PB
6	5	Melissa Morrison	United States	7.97	
7	8	Dionne Rose	Jamaica	8.05	
8	1	Irina Korotya	Russia	8.09	
