= Sriyani Kulawansa =

Sri Lankan hurdler

Medal record

Women's athletics

Representing Sri Lanka

Asian Championships
Gold medal – first place	1995 Jakarta	100 m hurdles
Silver medal – second place	1993 Manila	100 m hurdles
Silver medal – second place	2002 Colombo	100 m hurdles
Bronze medal – third place	1998 Fukuoka	100 m hurdles

Mohotti Arachchilage Sriyani Kulawansha-Fonsekca (born 1 March 1970) is a retired Sri Lankan hurdler. Her personal best time was 12.91 seconds, achieved in the quarter-finals of the 1996 Summer Olympics in Atlanta.

She represented Sri Lanka in the 1992 Olympic Games held in Spain at the young age of 22. The 1996 Olympic Games held in US saw her advancing to the quarter finals of the 100m Hurdles event as she registered her personal best timing of 12.91 sec. Her final Olympic Games were the 2000 Sydney Olympics.

She was very consistent in the Asian Championships and her best year was 1998, where she won Silver in the Commonwealth Games and Bronze in the Asian Games. From 1989 to 2004 she has participated in over 70 International Games, and still holds the record in the South Asian Games for the hurdles event.

== Early life ==
Sriyani Kulawansha describes her childhood as being the "vehicle of our house" as she used to run to buy groceries from her home located on a hill. It is there she realized her "energy and love" for sports.

She received her primary school education from Udakendawala Primary School and entered Ibbagamuwa Central College after passing the grade 5 scholarship exam. There she took part in all the four games for girls Athletics, Elle (a game like baseball), Netball and Volleyball and won the all island championship in all of them. And she won the best sportswoman award in 1989 for Athletics, Volleyball and Netball. She had to give up Netball and volleyball to focus on Athletics when she came to the national level.

She grew up in Melsiripura, a remote area in Sri Lanka's Kurunegala District.

== Professional career ==
While she was in 1989 South Asian Games practice squad she learned that high jump event has been cancelled due to lack of participants. But she credits her parents and coach Dervin Perera for motivating her to change to hurdles event.

She describes her biggest career achievement as winning the Silver Medals in the 1998 Commonwealth Games.

Sriyani retired from sports at the age of 34 even after getting selected to the 2004 Olympics. She says the decision was made because she knew that she had little chance to win and to give the opportunity to another athlete.

After retirement she was invited to work as a project officer at the Education Ministry to provide services to students.

== Competition record ==
Year	Competition	Venue	Position	Event	Notes
Representing Sri Lanka
1992	Olympic Games	Barcelona, Spain	28th (h)	100 m hurdles	13.55
1993	World Championships	Stuttgart, Germany	36th (h)	100 m hurdles	13.58
1993	Asian Championships	Manila, Philippines	2nd	100 m hurdles	13.38
1994	Asian Games	Hiroshima, Japan	4th	100 m hurdles	13.55
1995	World Championships	Gothenburg, Sweden	26th (h)	100 m hurdles	13.45
1995	Asian Championships	Jakarta, Indonesia	1st	100 m hurdles	13.29
1996	Olympic Games	Atlanta, United States	15th (qf)	100 m hurdles	12.91
1997	World Championships	Athens, Greece	16th (h)	100 m hurdles	13.07
1998	Asian Championships	Fukuoka, Japan	3rd	100 m hurdles	13.16
1998	Commonwealth Games	Kuala Lumpur, Malaysia	2nd	100 m hurdles	12.95
1998	Asian Games	Bangkok, Thailand	3rd	100 m hurdles	13.08
1998	Asian Games	Bangkok, Thailand	6th	4 × 100 m relay	44.94
1999	World Championships	Seville, Spain	15th (sf)	100 m hurdles	12.98
2000	Olympic Games	Sydney, Australia	18th (qf)	100 m hurdles	13.19
2001	World Championships	Edmonton, Canada	21st (h)	100 m hurdles	13.23
2002	Commonwealth Games	Manchester, United Kingdom	9th (h)	100 m hurdles	13.29
2002	Commonwealth Games	Manchester, United Kingdom	6th (f)	4 × 100 m relay	44.25
2002	Asian Championships	Colombo, Sri Lanka	9th (h)	100 m	12.13
2002	Asian Championships	Colombo, Sri Lanka	2nd	100 m hurdles	13.43
2002	Asian Games	Busan, South Korea	—	100 m hurdles	DNS
2003	Asian Championships	Manila, Philippines	4th	100 m hurdles	13.42
2004	South Asian Games	Islamabad, Pakistan	1st	100 m hurdles	13.37
2004	South Asian Games	Islamabad, Pakistan	1st	4 × 100 m relay	46.13
