= Yvonne Kanazawa =

Japanese hurdler (born 1974)

Medal record

Women's athletics

Representing Japan

Asian Championships
Gold medal – first place	2002 Colombo	100 m hurdles

Yvonne Kanazawa Scott (金沢 イボンヌ, Kanazawa Ibonnu; born 19 November 1974) is a retired Japanese athlete who specialised in the high hurdles. She represented her country at two consecutive Summer Olympics starting in 1996.

She was born in Shinjuku, Tokyo to a Japanese mother and a Jamaican father. She grew up in Sacramento.

She has personal bests of 13.00 seconds in the 100 metres hurdles (2000) and 8.12 seconds in the indoor 60 metres hurdles (1999). Both are current national records.

She is married to Larry Wade, another former professional hurdler and she has two sons (Jordan and Brandon). She is the head coach for sprints, hurdles and relays for the UNLV Rebels at the University of Las Vegas.

== Competition record ==
Year	Competition	Venue	Position	Event	Notes
Representing Japan
1996	Olympic Games	Atlanta, United States	34th (h)	100m hurdles	13.30
1997	World Indoor Championships	Paris, France	11th (sf)	60m hurdles	8.30
1997	World Championships	Athens, Greece	29th (h)	100m hurdles	13.34
1997	East Asian Games	Busan, South Korea	1st	100m hurdles	13.16
1998	Asian Games	Bangkok, Thailand	5th	100m hurdles	13.42
1999	World Indoor Championships	Maebashi, Japan	12th (h)	60m hurdles	8.12
1999	World Championships	Seville, Spain	30th (qf)	100m hurdles	13.33
1999	World Championships	Seville, Spain	14th (h)	4 × 100 m relay	44.80
2000	Olympic Games	Sydney, Australia	15th (sf)	100m hurdles	13.16
2001	World Indoor Championships	Lisbon, Portugal	18th (h)	60m hurdles	8.33
2002	Asian Championships	Colombo, Sri Lanka	1st	100m hurdles	13.40
2002	Asian Games	Busan, South Korea	5th	100m hurdles	13.57
2003	World Championships	Paris, France	34th (h)	100m hurdles	13.54
2003	Asian Championships	Manila, Philippines	8th (h)	100m hurdles	14.64
