= Lacena Golding-Clarke =

Jamaican athlete

Personal information
- Born: 20 March 1975 (age 51) Clarendon, Jamaica

Sport
- Sport: Track and field
Medal record
Women's athletics
Representing Jamaica
Commonwealth Games
Gold medal – first place	2002 Manchester	100 m hurdles
Pan American Games
Bronze medal – third place	2003 Santo Domingo	100m hurdles
Bronze medal – third place	2003 Santo Domingo	4×100m relay
CAC Championships
Gold medal – first place	1999 Bridgetown	Long jump
CAC Games
Bronze medal – third place	1998 Maracaibo	Long jump
CAC Junior Championships (U17)
Bronze medal – third place	1990 Havana	100 m hurdles
Bronze medal – third place	1990 Havana	Long jump
CARIFTA Games Junior (U20)
Gold medal – first place	1993 Fort-de-France	Long Jump
Silver medal – second place	1993 Fort-de-France	Triple Jump
Silver medal – second place	1992 Nassau	High Jump
Silver medal – second place	1992 Nassau	Long Jump
Bronze medal – third place	1993 Fort-de-France	High Jump
CARIFTA Games Youth (U17)
Gold medal – first place	1991 Port of Spain	High Jump
Gold medal – first place	1991 Port of Spain	Discus Throw
Silver medal – second place	1991 Port of Spain	Long Jump
Bronze medal – third place	1989 Bridgetown	High Jump

Lacena Golding-Clarke (born 20 March 1975) is a Jamaican retired female hurdler athlete. She represented Jamaica at the Summer Olympics in 1996, 2000 and 2004, and took part in the World Championships in Athletics on five occasions.

== Career ==
She began her career as a long jumper and she participated in this event at the 1996 and 2000 Olympic Games. Her personal best jump is 6.87 metres, achieved in June 1998 in Kingston.

She won a gold medal in the 100 metres hurdles at the 2002 Commonwealth Games. Her personal best time is 12.68 seconds, achieved in June 2005 in Kingston. Other high points of her hurdles career included a bronze at the 2003 Pan American Games and a bronze at the 2006 Commonwealth Games.

She retired from track and field in 2010 after having reached her sixth consecutive 60 m final at the IAAF World Indoor Championships.

After graduating from Auburn University with a BA in Political Science and Government in 1999, Golding-Clarke was a volunteer assistant coach at Auburn from March 1999 to August 2006 and then moved to the University of Texas at Austin to work as a coach from September 2006 to 2011. In May 2012, Golding-Clarke became the assistant coach at the University of Texas at El Paso (UTEP). While at UTEP, Golding-Clarke coached 13 All-Americans, 32 regional qualifiers, 32 C-USA individual title winners, and eight school record-breakers, including Tobi Amusan, the first Nigerian athlete to win a gold medal at the World Athletics Championships. Amusan finished the 100-meter hurdles in 12.12 seconds, breaking the previous world record of 12.20 seconds set by US Olympian Kendra Harrison in 2016. In January 2022, Golding-Clarke returned to Auburn University as Assistant Coach for the Women’s Sprints and Hurdles.

== Achievements ==
Year	Competition	Venue	Position	Event	Notes
Representing Jamaica
1989	CARIFTA Games (U-17)	Bridgetown, Barbados	3rd	High jump	1.58 m
1990	Central American and Caribbean Junior Championships (U-17)	Havana, Cuba	3rd	100 m hurdles	15.07 (-0.3 m/s)
1990	Central American and Caribbean Junior Championships (U-17)	Havana, Cuba	7th	High jump	1.55 m
1990	Central American and Caribbean Junior Championships (U-17)	Havana, Cuba	3rd	Long jump	5.44 m (0.1 m/s)
1990	Central American and Caribbean Junior Championships (U-17)	Havana, Cuba	5th	Discus throw	30.20 m
1991	CARIFTA Games (U-17)	Port of Spain, Trinidad and Tobago	1st	High jump	1.62 m
1991	CARIFTA Games (U-17)	Port of Spain, Trinidad and Tobago	2nd	Long jump	5.92 m
1991	CARIFTA Games (U-17)	Port of Spain, Trinidad and Tobago	1st	Discus throw	31.44 m
1992	CARIFTA Games (U-20)	Nassau, Bahamas	2nd	High jump	1.66 m
1992	CARIFTA Games (U-20)	Nassau, Bahamas	2nd	Long jump	6.15 m
1992	World Junior Championships	Seoul, South Korea	6th	Long jump	6.09 m (0.3 m/s)
1993	CARIFTA Games (U-20)	Fort-de-France, Martinique	3rd	High jump	1.64 m
1993	CARIFTA Games (U-20)	Fort-de-France, Martinique	1st	Long jump	6.07 m
1993	CARIFTA Games (U-20)	Fort-de-France, Martinique	2nd	Triple jump	12.27 m
1993	CARIFTA Games (U-20)	Fort-de-France, Martinique	4th	Javelin throw	36.86 m
1994	World Junior Championships	Lisbon, Portugal	6th	Long jump	6.27 m (1.7 m/s)
1995	World Championships	Gothenburg, Sweden	9th (q)	Long jump	6.45 m (1.2 m/s)
1997	World Championships	Athens, Greece	12th (q)	Long jump	6.50 m (-0.1 m/s)
1998	Central American and Caribbean Games	Maracaibo, Venezuela	3rd	Long jump	6.49
1999	Central American and Caribbean Championships	Bridgetown, Barbados	1st	Long jump	6.52
2000	Olympic Games	Sydney, Australia	11th (q)	Long jump	6.39 m (0.7 m/s)
2001	World Indoor Championships	Lisbon, Portugal	8th	60 m hurdles	8.24
2002	Commonwealth Games	Manchester, England	1st	100 m hurdles	12.77 (0.6 m/s)
2003	World Indoor Championships	Birmingham, England	4th	60 m hurdles	7.92
2003	Pan American Games	Santo Domingo, DR	3rd	100 m hurdles	12.79 (-0.3 m/s)
2003	Pan American Games	Santo Domingo, DR	3rd	4 × 100 m relay	43.71
2003	World Championships	Paris, France	8th	100 m hurdles	12.87 (-0.2 m/s)
2003	World Athletics Final	Monte Carlo, Monaco	7th	100 m hurdles	13.10 (1.3 m/s)
2004	World Indoor Championships	Budapest, Hungary	6th	60 m hurdles	7.89
2004	Olympic Games	Athens, Greece	5th	100 m hurdles	12.73 (1.5 m/s)
2004	World Athletics Final	Monte Carlo, Monaco	3rd	100 m hurdles	12.69 (1.0 m/s)
2006	World Indoor Championships	Moscow, Russia	6th	60 m hurdles	7.94
2006	Commonwealth Games	Melbourne, Australia	4th	100 m hurdles	13.01 (-0.3 m/s)
2007	World Championships	Osaka, Japan	6th (sf)	100 m hurdles	12.85 (0.5 m/s)
2009	World Championships	Berlin, Germany	4th (sf)	100 m hurdles	12.76 (0.3 m/s)
