= Maíla Machado =

Brazilian hurdler (born 1981)

Personal information
- Born: 22 January 1981 (age 45) Limeira, Brazil

Sport
- Sport: Track and field
Medal record
Representing Brazil
Summer Universiade
Silver medal – second place	2001 Beijing	4x100m relay

Maíla Paula Machado (born 22 January 1981) is a Brazilian athlete specializing in the 100 metres hurdles event. She competed twice at the Olympic Games, in 2004 in Athens and in 2008 in Beijing, both times failing to progress to the second round.

Her indoor 60 metres hurdles personal best of 8.08 is the current South American record.

== Competition record ==
Year	Competition	Venue	Position	Event	Notes
Representing Brazil
1998	South American Junior Championships	Córdoba, Argentina	3rd	100 m H	14.57
1998	World Youth Games	Moscow, Russia	12th (sf)	100 m H	14.54
1998	World Youth Games	Moscow, Russia	7th	4 × 100 m	49.33
1999	Pan American Junior Championships	Tampa, United States	3rd	100 m H	13.92
1999	South American Junior Championships	Concepción, Chile	1st	100 m H	13.85
2000	Ibero-American Championships	Rio de Janeiro, Brazil	2nd	100 m H	13.25
2000	World Junior Championships	Santiago, Chile	8th	100 m H	13.50 (-1.7 m/s)
2000	South American Junior Championships	São Leopoldo, Brazil	1st	100 m H	14.00
2001	South American Championships	Manaus, Brazil	2nd	100 m H	13.18
2001	Universiade	Beijing, China	7th	100 m H	13.38
2001	Universiade	Beijing, China	2nd	4 × 100 m	44.13
2002	Ibero-American Championships	Guatemala City, Guatemala	1st	100 m H	13.15
2003	World Indoor Championships	Birmingham, United Kingdom	19th (h)	60 m H	8.29
2003	South American Championships	Barquisimeto, Venezuela	2nd	100 m H	13.63
2003	Pan American Games	Santo Domingo, Dominican Republic	9th (h)	100 m H	13.17
2003	World Championships	Paris, France	23rd (sf)	100 m H	13.34
2004	Ibero-American Championships	Huelva, Spain	2nd	100 m H	13.42
2004	Olympic Games	Athens, Greece	27th (h)	100 m H	13.35
2005	South American Championships	Cali, Colombia	1st	100 m H	13.18
2005	World Championships	Helsinki, Finland	26th (h)	100 m H	13.21
2006	World Indoor Championships	Moscow, Russia	16th (h)	60 m H	8.08 (AR)
2006	Ibero-American Championships	Ponce, Puerto Rico	1st	100 m H	13.02
2006	Ibero-American Championships	Ponce, Puerto Rico	1st	4 × 100 m	44.49
2006	South American Championships	Tunja, Colombia	1st	100 m H	13.28
2006	South American Championships	Tunja, Colombia	1st	4 × 100 m	44.72
2008	Olympic Games	Beijing, China	33rd (h)	100 m H	13.45
2010	Ibero-American Championships	San Fernando, Spain	9th (h)	100 m H	13.74
2011	South American Championships	Buenos Aires, Argentina	2nd	100 m H	13.22
2011	Pan American Games	Guadalajara, Mexico	5th	100 m H	13.14
2012	Ibero-American Championships	Barquisimeto, Venezuela	5th	100 m H	13.47
2016	Ibero-American Championships	Rio de Janeiro, Brazil	2nd	100 m H	12.99
2016	Olympic Games	Rio de Janeiro, Brazil	30th (h)	100 m H	13.09

== Personal bests ==
Outdoors

- 100m – 12.25 (+0.4 m/s) (Hamburg 2002)
- 110m hurdles – 12.86 (+0.2 m/s) (São Paulo 2004)

Indoors

- 60m hurdles – 8.08 (Moscow 2006)
