= Athletics at the 2004 Summer Olympics – Women's 100 metres hurdles =

Women's 100 metres hurdles at the Games of the XXVIII Olympiad
- Olympic Athletics
- Venue: Athens Olympic Stadium
- Dates: 22–24 August
- Competitors: 38 from 24 nations
- Winning time: 12.37 OR

Medalists
1st place, gold medalist(s)		Joanna Hayes	United States
2nd place, silver medalist(s)		Olena Krasovska	Ukraine
3rd place, bronze medalist(s)		Melissa Morrison	United States

The women's 100 metres hurdles at the 2004 Summer Olympics as part of the athletics program were held at the Athens Olympic Stadium from August 22 to 24.

The top two runners in each of the initial five heats automatically qualified for the semifinals. The next six fastest runners from across the heats also qualified. There were two semifinal heats, and only the top four from each heat advanced to the final. Two time Olympic 100 meter gold medalist and defending world champion at 100 meter hurdles Gail Devers continued her run of Olympic misfortune in the hurdles, falling with a calf injury at the first hurdle of her first-round heat.

Joanna Hayes led through all the rounds, her closest competitor, Perdita Felicien. In the final, Felicien crashed the first hurdle with her lead leg, falling to her right and taking out Irina Shevchenko along with her. In the lane to her left, Hayes zoomed away from the field unabated, challenged by American teammate Melissa Morrison through the first four hurdles, which Morrison clipped, almost turned sideways to keep her balance and slowing through the next two hurdles. Lacena Golding-Clarke and Olena Krasovska battled on the inside of the track. As Krasovska began to edge ahead for the silver, Clarke slowed over the last four hurdles while Morrison battled back to take the bronze.

== Records ==
Prior to the competition, the existing World record, Olympic record, and world leading time were as follows:

World record	Yordanka Donkova (BUL)	12.21 s	Stara Zagora, Bulgaria	20 August 1988
Olympic record	Yordanka Donkova (BUL)	12.38 s	Seoul, South Korea	30 September 1988
World Leading	Perdita Felicien (CAN)	12.46 s	Eugene, Oregon, United States	19 June 2004

The following records were established during the competition:

Date	Event	Athlete	Nation	Time	Record
24 August	Final	Joanna Hayes	United States	12.37	OR

== Qualification ==
The qualification period for athletics was 1 January 2003 to 9 August 2004. For the women's 100 metres hurdles, each National Olympic Committee was permitted to enter up to three athletes that had run the race in 12.96 seconds or faster during the qualification period. If an NOC had no athletes that qualified under that standard, one athlete that had run the race in 13.11 seconds or faster could be entered.

== Schedule ==
All times are Greece Standard Time (UTC+2)

Date	Time	Round
Sunday, 22 August 2004	19:35	Round 1
Monday, 23 August 2004	19:00	Semifinals
Tuesday, 24 August 2004	22:30	Final

== Results ==
=== Round 1 ===
Qualification rule: The first two finishers in each heat (Q) plus the next six fastest overall runners (q) advanced to the semifinals.

==== Heat 1 ====
Wind: −1.2 m/s

Rank	Lane	Athlete	Nation	Reaction	Time	Notes
1	4	Melissa Morrison	United States	0.154	12.76	Q
2	3	Delloreen Ennis-London	Jamaica	0.157	12.77	Q
3	6	Nadine Faustin	Haiti	0.191	12.94	q
4	7	Aliuska López	Spain	0.210	13.21	
5	2	Anay Tejeda	Cuba	0.157	13.24	
6	5	Juliane Sprenger-Afflerbach	Germany	0.202	13.28	
7	1	Irina Lenskiy	Israel	0.248	13.75	
8	8	Céline Laporte	Seychelles	0.172	13.92	

==== Heat 2 ====
Wind: −0.9 m/s

Rank	Lane	Athlete	Nation	Reaction	Time	Notes
1	2	Brigitte Foster	Jamaica	0.154	12.83	Q
2	7	Glory Alozie	Spain	0.279	12.92	Q
3	6	Angela Whyte	Canada	0.245	13.01	q
4	8	Linda Ferga-Khodadin	France	0.279	13.02	
5	4	Jenny Kallur	Sweden	0.233	13.11	
6	1	Nadine Hentschke	Germany	0.176	13.36	
7	3	Rosa Rakotozafy	Madagascar	0.179	13.67	
8	5	Trecia Roberts	Thailand	0.202	13.80	

==== Heat 3 ====
Wind: 0.0 m/s

Rank	Lane	Athlete	Nation	Reaction	Time	Notes
1	6	Mariya Koroteyeva	Russia	0.194	12.72	Q
2	4	Perdita Felicien	Canada	0.173	12.73	Q
3	5	Lacena Golding-Clarke	Jamaica	0.165	12.86	q
4	3	Susanna Kallur	Sweden	0.242	12.89	q, SB
5	2	Flora Redoumi	Greece	0.184	13.14	
6	7	Maíla Machado	Brazil	0.226	13.35	
7	8	Su Yiping	China	0.230	13.53	

==== Heat 4 ====
Wind: −1.4 m/s

Rank	Lane	Athlete	Nation	Reaction	Time	Notes
1	3	Joanna Hayes	United States	0.175	12.71	Q
2	4	Natalia Rusakova	Russia	0.201	12.90	Q
3	1	Aurelia Trywiańska	Poland	0.184	13.01	
4	2	Nicole Ramalalanirina	France	0.185	13.07	
5	6	Priscilla Lopes	Canada	0.205	13.08	
6	7	Sarah Claxton	Great Britain	0.241	13.14	
7	5	Derval O'Rourke	Ireland	0.198	13.46	
8	8	Maria-Joëlle Conjungo	Central African Republic	0.183	14.24	

==== Heat 5 ====
Wind: −0.9 m/s

Rank	Lane	Athlete	Nation	Reaction	Time	Notes
1	5	Reïna-Flor Okori	France	0.186	12.81	Q, PB
2	3	Irina Shevchenko	Russia	0.180	12.82	Q
3	2	Olena Krasovska	Ukraine	0.201	12.84	q
4	7	Kirsten Bolm	Germany	0.170	12.85	q
5	8	Lucie Martincová	Czech Republic	0.189	13.51	
	6	Gail Devers	United States	0.170	DNF	
	4	Svetla Pishtikova	Bulgaria		DNS	

=== Semifinals ===
Qualification rule: The first four finishers in each heat (Q) moved on to the final.

==== Semifinal 1 ====
Wind: +1.7 m/s

Rank	Lane	Athlete	Nation	Reaction	Time	Notes
1	4	Perdita Felicien	Canada	0.171	12.49	Q
2	6	Melissa Morrison	United States	0.156	12.53	Q, =PB
3	1	Olena Krasovska	Ukraine	0.145	12.58	Q, PB
4	5	Mariya Koroteyeva	Russia	0.166	12.60	Q, PB
5	3	Delloreen Ennis-London	Jamaica	0.167	12.60	
6	8	Glory Alozie	Spain	0.165	12.62	
7	7	Susanna Kallur	Sweden	0.173	12.67	PB
8	2	Nadine Faustin	Haiti	0.170	12.74	NR

==== Semifinal 2 ====
Wind: +1.9 m/s

Rank	Lane	Athlete	Nation	Reaction	Time	Notes
1	5	Joanna Hayes	United States	0.190	12.48	Q, PB
2	3	Irina Shevchenko	Russia	0.160	12.67	Q, =PB
3	2	Lacena Golding-Clarke	Jamaica	0.153	12.69	Q, =PB
4	7	Angela Whyte	Canada	0.117	12.69	Q, PB
5	1	Natalia Rusakova	Russia	0.178	12.76	
6	6	Reïna-Flor Okori	France	0.187	12.81	=PB
	8	Kirsten Bolm	Germany	0.194	DNF	
	4	Brigitte Foster	Jamaica		DNS	

=== Final ===
Wind: +1.5 m/s

Rank	Lane	Athlete	Nation	Reaction	Time	Notes
1st place, gold medalist(s)	4	Joanna Hayes	United States	0.169	12.37	OR
2nd place, silver medalist(s)	1	Olena Krasovska	Ukraine	0.151	12.45	PB
3rd place, bronze medalist(s)	3	Melissa Morrison	United States	0.145	12.56	
4	7	Mariya Koroteyeva	Russia	0.195	12.72	
5	2	Lacena Golding-Clarke	Jamaica	0.149	12.73	
6	8	Angela Whyte	Canada	0.155	12.81	
	5	Perdita Felicien	Canada	0.167	DNF	
	6	Irina Shevchenko	Russia	0.155	DNF	
