= Feng Yun (hurdler) =

Chinese hurdler (born 1976)

Personal information
- Born: February 23, 1976 (age 50) Guangdong, China

Sport
- Sport: Track and field
Medal record
Representing China
Summer Universiade
Silver medal – second place	1997 Catania	100 m hurdles
Asian Games
Gold medal – first place	2002 Busan	100 m hurdles
Silver medal – second place	2006 Doha	100 m hurdles
East Asian Games
Gold medal – first place	2001 Osaka	100 m hurdles
Gold medal – first place	2005 Macau	100 m hurdles
Asian Championships
Silver medal – second place	1998 Fukuoka	100 m hurdles
Silver medal – second place	2003 Manila	100 m hurdles

Feng Yun (simplified Chinese: 冯云; traditional Chinese: 馮雲; pinyin: Féng Yún; born February 23, 1976) is a female Chinese hurdler.

Her personal best time is 12.85 seconds, achieved during the heats at the 1999 World Championships in Seville.

== Competition record ==
Year	Competition	Venue	Position	Event	Notes
Representing China
1997	Universiade	Catania, Italy	2nd	100 m hurdles	13.19
1998	Asian Championships	Fukuoka, Japan	2nd	100 m hurdles	13.10
1999	World Indoor Championships	Maebashi, Japan	13th (h)	60 m hurdles	8.14
1999	World Championships	Seville, Spain	15th (sf)	100 m hurdles	12.98
2000	Olympic Games	Sydney, Australia	26th (h)	100 m hurdles	13.19
2001	East Asian Games	Osaka, Japan	1st	100 m hurdles	13.12
2001	World Championships	Edmonton, Canada	26th (h)	100 m hurdles	13.35
2002	Asian Games	Busan, South Korea	1st	100 m hurdles	12.96
2003	World Indoor Championships	Birmingham, United Kingdom	15th (sf)	60 m hurdles	8.36
2003	World Championships	Paris, France	32nd (h)	100 m hurdles	13.50
2003	Asian Championships	Manila, Philippines	2nd	100 m hurdles	13.25
2003	Afro-Asian Games	Hyderabad, India	2nd	100 m hurdles	13.20
2005	World Championships	Helsinki, Finland	19th (sf)	100 m hurdles	13.15
2005	East Asian Games	Macau	1st	100 m hurdles	13.09
2006	World Indoor Championships	Moscow, Russia	13th (sf)	60 m hurdles	8.12
2006	Asian Games	Doha, Qatar	2nd	100 m hurdles	13.10
