= 2000 Asian Athletics Championships – Women's 100 metres hurdles =

The women's 100 metres hurdles event at the 2000 Asian Athletics Championships was held in Jakarta, Indonesia on 28–30 August.

== Medalists ==
Gold	Silver	Bronze
Su Yiping; China	Trecia Roberts; Thailand	Anuradha Biswal; India

== Results ==
=== Heats ===
Wind:
Heat 1: +0.3 m/s, Heat 2: -0.6 m/s

Rank	Heat	Name	Nationality	Time	Notes
1	1	Su Yiping	China	13.28	Q
2	2	Trecia Roberts	Thailand	13.31	Q
3	2	Anuradha Biswal	India	13.56	Q
4	1	Vũ Bích Hường	Vietnam	13.62	Q
5	1	Moh Siew Wei	Malaysia	13.70	Q
6	2	Pradeepa Herath	Sri Lanka	13.86	Q
7	2	Dedeh Erawati	Indonesia	13.94	q
8	2	Akiko Morimoto	Japan	14.09	q
9	2	Kaniz Farhama Shammi	Bangladesh	15.44	NR
	1	Alaa Abdelhadi	Jordan	DNF	

=== Final ===
Wind: +0.8 m/s

Rank	Name	Nationality	Time	Notes
1st place, gold medalist(s)	Su Yiping	China	12.99	
2nd place, silver medalist(s)	Trecia Roberts	Thailand	13.01	
3rd place, bronze medalist(s)	Anuradha Biswal	India	13.40	NR
4	Vũ Bích Hường	Vietnam	13.50	
5	Moh Siew Wei	Malaysia	13.80	
6	Dedeh Erawati	Indonesia	13.85	
7	Akiko Morimoto	Japan	13.93	
	Pradeepa Herath	Sri Lanka	DNF	
