= Trecia Roberts =

Thai 100 metres hurdles (born 1971)

Medal record

Women's athletics

Representing Thailand

Asian Championships
Silver medal – second place	2000 Jakarta	100 m hurdles
Bronze medal – third place	2002 Colombo	100 m hurdles
Bronze medal – third place	2002 Colombo	4×100 m
Bronze medal – third place	2003 Manila	100 m hurdles

Trecia Roberts (Thai: ทรีเซีย โรเบิร์ตส; born 4 February 1971 in Bangkok, Krung Thep Maha Nakhon) is a Thai-American 100 metres hurdles runner. She was born to a Thai mother and an African-American father.

She competed for the United States up to and including the 1999 indoor season, but represented Thailand at the 1999 World Championships.

She won the silver medal at the 2000 Asian Championships and bronze medals at the Asian Championships in 2002 and 2003 as well as the 2002 Asian Games, where she also helped win a silver medal in 4 x 100 metres relay. She finished sixth at the 2006 Asian Games.

She also competed at the World Championships in 1999, 2001, 2003 and 2005, the World Indoor Championships in 2001 and the Olympic Games in 2000 and 2004 without reaching the final.

Her personal best time is 12.73 seconds, achieved in July 1998 in Flagstaff. She competed for the United States at the time, but later set a Thai record of 12.83 seconds.

== Competition record ==
Year	Competition	Venue	Position	Event	Notes
Representing Thailand
1999	World Championships	Seville, Spain	11th (sf)	100m hurdles	12.83
2000	Asian Championships	Jakarta, Indonesia	2nd	100m hurdles	13.01
2000	Asian Championships	Jakarta, Indonesia	4th	4 × 100 m relay	45.14
2000	Olympic Games	Sydney, Australia	14th (sf)	100m hurdles	13.15
2000	Olympic Games	Sydney, Australia	19th (h)	4 × 100 m relay	44.51
2001	World Indoor Championships	Lisbon, Portugal	19th (h)	60m hurdles	8.34
2001	World Championships	Edmonton, Canada	23rd (h)	100m hurdles	13.27
2001	Southeast Asian Games	Kuala Lumpur, Malaysia	1st	100m hurdles	13.21
2002	Asian Championships	Colombo, Sri Lanka	3rd	100m hurdles	13.60
2002	Asian Championships	Colombo, Sri Lanka	3rd	4 × 100 m relay	44.89
2002	Asian Games	Busan, South Korea	3rd	100m hurdles	13.07
2002	Asian Games	Busan, South Korea	2nd	4 × 100 m relay	44.25
2003	World Championships	Paris, France	27th (h)	100m hurdles	13.29
2003	Asian Championships	Manila, Philippines	3rd	100m hurdles	13.29
2003	Southeast Asian Games	Hanoi, Vietnam	1st	100m hurdles	13.45 (w)
2004	Olympic Games	Athens, Greece	34th (h)	100m hurdles	13.80
2005	World Championships	Helsinki, Finland	28th (h)	100m hurdles	13.93
2005	Asian Championships	Incheon, South Korea	7th (h)	100m hurdles	13.83
2005	Asian Indoor Games	Pattaya, Thailand	3rd	60m hurdles	8.56
2005	Southeast Asian Games	Manila, Philippines	3rd	100m hurdles	14.25
2006	Asian Games	Doha, Qatar	6th	100m hurdles	13.75
