= 2002 Asian Athletics Championships – Women's 100 metres hurdles =

The women's 100 metres hurdles event at the 2002 Asian Athletics Championships was held in Colombo, Sri Lanka on 10–12 August.

== Medalists ==
Gold	Silver	Bronze
Yvonne Kanazawa; Japan	Sriyani Kulawansa-Fonseka; Sri Lanka	Trecia Roberts; Thailand

== Results ==
=== Heats ===
Wind:
Heat 1: +0.4 m/s, Heat 2: 0.0 m/s

Rank	Heat	Name	Nationality	Time	Notes
1	2	Yvonne Kanazawa	Japan	13.53	Q
2	2	Trecia Roberts	Thailand	13.59	Q
3	1	Sriyani Kulawansa-Fonseka	Sri Lanka	13.67	Q
4	1	Akiko Morimoto	Japan	13.77	Q
5	1	Moh Siew Wei	Malaysia	14.02	Q
6	2	Yelena Nikitenko	Kazakhstan	14.15	Q
7	1	Pradeepa Herath	Sri Lanka	14.32	q
8	2	W.K.I. Umayangani	Sri Lanka	14.80	q
9	2	Cheung Man Lo	Hong Kong	14.99	SB
	2	Shim Mi-Ra	South Korea	DNF	

=== Final ===
Wind: +2.1 m/s

Rank	Name	Nationality	Time	Notes
1st place, gold medalist(s)	Yvonne Kanazawa	Japan	13.40	
2nd place, silver medalist(s)	Sriyani Kulawansa-Fonseka	Sri Lanka	13.43	
3rd place, bronze medalist(s)	Trecia Roberts	Thailand	13.60	
4	Moh Siew Wei	Malaysia	13.83	
5	Akiko Morimoto	Japan	13.84	
6	Yelena Nikitenko	Kazakhstan	13.87	
7	W.K.I. Umayangani	Sri Lanka	14.77	PB
	Pradeepa Herath	Sri Lanka	DNF	
