= Gail Devers =

American athlete (born 1966)

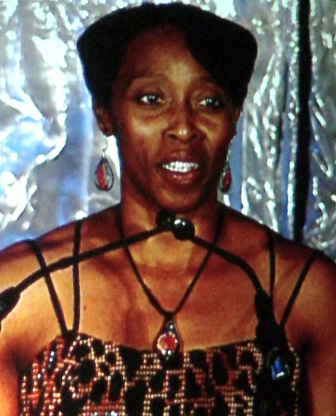
- Gail Devers during her induction to the National Track and Field Hall of Fame, 2011

Personal information
- Full name: Yolanda Gail Devers
- Born: November 19, 1966 (age 59) Seattle, Washington, U.S.
- Height: 5 ft 3 in (160 cm)
- Weight: 121 lb (55 kg)

Sport
- Events: Hurdles, Sprints
- College team: University of California, Los Angeles
Medal record
Women's athletics
Representing United States
Olympic Games
Gold medal – first place	1992 Barcelona	100 m
Gold medal – first place	1996 Atlanta	100 m
Gold medal – first place	1996 Atlanta	4 × 100 m relay
World Championships
Gold medal – first place	1993 Stuttgart	100 m
Gold medal – first place	1993 Stuttgart	100 m hurdles
Gold medal – first place	1995 Gothenburg	100 m hurdles
Gold medal – first place	1997 Athens	4 × 100 m relay
Gold medal – first place	1999 Seville	100 m hurdles
Silver medal – second place	1991 Tokyo	100 m hurdles
Silver medal – second place	1993 Stuttgart	4 × 100 m relay
Silver medal – second place	2001 Edmonton	100 m hurdles
World Indoor Championships
Gold medal – first place	1993 Toronto	60 m
Gold medal – first place	1997 Paris	60 m
Gold medal – first place	2003 Birmingham	60 m hurdles
Gold medal – first place	2004 Budapest	60 m
Silver medal – second place	2004 Budapest	60 m hurdles
Pan American Games
Gold medal – first place	1987 Indianapolis	100 m
Gold medal – first place	1987 Indianapolis	4 × 100 m relay

Yolanda Gail Devers (/ˈdiːvərz/ DEE-vərz; born November 19, 1966) is an American retired track and field sprinter who competed in the 60 metres, 60 m hurdles, 100 m and 100 m hurdles. One of the greatest and most decorated female sprinters of all time, she was the 1993, 1997 and 2004 world indoor champion in the 60 m, while in the 60 m hurdles, she was the 2003 world indoor champion and 2004 silver medalist. In the 100 m, she is the second woman in history to defend an Olympic 100 m title, winning gold at both the 1992 and 1996 Olympics. She was also the 1993 world champion in the event, becoming the first ever female sprinter to simultaneously hold the world and Olympic titles in the 100 m. In the 100 m hurdles, she was the 1993, 1995 and 1999 world champion, and the 1991 and 2001 world silver medalist. In 2011, she was inducted into the National Track and Field Hall of Fame.

== Life and career ==
Devers was born in Seattle, Washington, and grew up near National City, California, graduating from Sweetwater High School in 1984. Sweetwater's football and track stadium would later be named Gail Devers Stadium. A young talent in the 100 m and 100 m hurdles, Devers was in training for the 1988 Summer Olympics, started experiencing health problems, suffering from among others migraine and vision loss. She qualified for the Olympics 100 m hurdles, in which she was eliminated in the semi-finals, but her health continued to deteriorate.

Devers started in 800 m in high school and ran a personal best of 2:08.

In 1990, she was diagnosed with Graves' disease and underwent radioactive iodine treatment followed by thyroid hormone replacement therapy. During her radiation treatment, Devers began to develop blistering and swelling of her feet. Eventually, she could barely walk. Devers recovered after the radiation treatment was discontinued, and she resumed training. At the 1991 World Championships, she won a silver medal in the 100 m hurdles.

At the 1992 Summer Olympics, Devers starred. She qualified for the final of the 100 m, which ended in an exciting finish, with five women finishing close (within 0.06 seconds). The photo finish showed Devers had narrowly beaten Jamaican Juliet Cuthbert. In the final of the 100 m hurdles, Devers' lead event, she seemed to be running towards a second gold medal, when she hit the final hurdle and stumbled over the finish line in fifth place, leaving Voula Patoulidou from Greece as the upset winner.

In 1993, Devers won the 1993 World Championships in Athletics 100 m title after – again – a photo finish win over Merlene Ottey in an apparent dead heat, and the 100 m hurdles title. She retained her hurdles title in 1995.

The 100 m final at the 1996 Summer Olympics was an almost exact repeat of the World Championships final three years before. Ottey and Devers again finished in the same time and did not know who had won the race. Again, both were awarded the same time of 10.94 seconds, but Devers was judged to have finished first and became the first woman to retain the Olympic 100 m title since Wyomia Tyus. Shelly-Ann Fraser-Pryce duplicated the feat in 2012, and Elaine Thompson-Herah in 2021. In the final of her favorite event, Devers again failed, as she finished fourth and outside of the medals. With the 4 × 100 m relay team, Devers won her third Olympic gold medal.

After these Olympics, Devers concentrated on the hurdles event, winning the World Championship again in 1999, but she had to forfeit for the semi-finals at the 2000 Summer Olympics.

Devers competed in the 100 m and 100 m hurdles at the 2004 Summer Olympics in Athens, her fifth Olympic Games.

Devers left competition in 2005 to give birth to a child with her husband and returned in 2006.

On February 2, 2007, at the age of 40, Devers edged 2004 Olympic champion Joanna Hayes to win the 60 m hurdles event at the Millrose Games in 7.86 seconds – the best time in the world that season and just 0.12 off the record she set in 2003. Furthermore, the time bettered the listed World Record for a 40-year-old by almost 7 tenths of a second.

During her career, Devers was notable for having exceptionally long, heavily decorated fingernails. One of the fastest starters in the world, Devers even had to alter her starting position to accommodate her long nails. Her long nails came as the result of a contest her father devised to get her to stop biting her nails as a child.

== International competitions ==
Year	Competition	Venue	Position	Event	Result
Representing the United States
1988	Olympic Games	Seoul, South Korea	8th (sf)	100 metres hurdles	13.51
1991	World Championships	Tokyo, Japan	2nd	100 metres hurdles	12.63
1992	Olympic Games	Barcelona, Spain	1st	100 metres	10.82
1992	Olympic Games	Barcelona, Spain	5th	100 metres hurdles	12.75
1993	World Indoor Championships	Toronto, Canada	1st	60 metres	6.95
1993	World Championships	Stuttgart, Germany	1st	100 metres	10.82
1993	World Championships	Stuttgart, Germany	1st	100 metres hurdles	12.46
1993	World Championships	Stuttgart, Germany	2nd	4 × 100 metres	41.49
1995	World Championships	Göteborg, Sweden	1st	100 metres hurdles	12.68
1996	Olympic Games	Atlanta, United States	1st	100 metres	10.94
1996	Olympic Games	Atlanta, United States	4th	100 metres hurdles	12.66
1996	Olympic Games	Atlanta, United States	1st	4 × 100 metres	41.95
1997	World Indoor Championships	Paris, France	1st	60 metres	7.06
1997	World Championships	Athens, Greece	1st	4 × 100 metres	41.47
1999	World Indoor Championships	Maebashi, Japan	2nd	60 metres	7.02
1999	World Championships	Seville, Spain	5th	100 metres	10.95
1999	World Championships	Seville, Spain	1st	100 metres hurdles	12.37
1999	World Championships	Seville, Spain	4th	4 × 100 metres	42.30
2000	Olympic Games	Sydney, Australia	—	100 metres hurdles	DNF (sf)
2001	World Championships	Edmonton, Canada	2nd	100 metres hurdles	12.54
2002	IAAF World Cup	Madrid, Spain	1st	100 metres hurdles	12.65
2003	World Indoor Championships	Birmingham, United Kingdom	1st	60 metres hurdles	7.81
2003	World Championships	Paris, France	6th	100 metres	11.11
2003	World Championships	Paris, France	3rd (sf)	100 metres hurdles	12.87
2003	World Athletics Final	Monte Carlo, Monaco	1st	100 metres hurdles	12.45
2004	World Indoor Championships	Budapest, Hungary	1st	60 metres	7.08
2004	World Indoor Championships	Budapest, Hungary	2nd	60 metres hurdles	7.78
2004	Olympic Games	Athens, Greece	7th (sf)	100 metres	11.22
2004	Olympic Games	Athens, Greece	—	100 metres hurdles	DNF (sf)

== Achievements and recognition ==
In 2011, she was elected into the National Track and Field Hall of Fame. The following year she was elected into the United States Olympic Hall of Fame. In November 2012, Devers was announced as a 2013 recipient of the NCAA Silver Anniversary Award, presented annually to six distinguished former college student-athletes on the 25th anniversary of the end of their college sports careers.

Awards and achievements
Preceded by Evelyn Ashford; Marion Jones	Women's Track & Field ESPY Award; 1994; 2003–2004	Succeeded by Gwen Torrence; Not awarded
Sporting positions
Preceded by Ludmila Engquist; Glory Alozie; Anjanette Kirkland	Women's 100 m Hurdles Best Year Performance; 1993; 1999–2000; 2002–2003	Succeeded by Tatyana Reshetnykova & Svetla Dimitrova; Anjanette Kirkland; Joanna Hayes
