= Vũ Bích Hường =

Vietnamese hurdler

Vũ Bích Hường (born 30 November 1969) is a retired Vietnamese athlete specialising in the 100 metres hurdles and heptathlon. She represented her country at two Summer Olympics, in 1996 and 2000, failing to qualify for the second round at both occasions.

She had a traffic accident in December 2014, causing damage to the vertebrae and her left leg limped.

== Competition record ==
Year	Competition	Venue	Position	Event	Notes
Representing Vietnam
1993	Southeast Asian Games	Singapore	3rd	100 m hurdles	14.13
1996	Olympic Games	Atlanta, United States	39th (h)	100 m hurdles	13.85
1998	Asian Games	Bangkok, Thailand	7th	100 m hurdles	13.72
1999	World Championships	Seville, Spain	34th (h)	100 m hurdles	13.36
2000	Asian Championships	Jakarta, Indonesia	4th	100 m hurdles	13.61
2000	Olympic Games	Sydney, Australia	32nd (h)	100 m hurdles	13.61
2001	Southeast Asian Games	Kuala Lumpur, Malaysia	3rd	100 m hurdles	13.47
2003	Southeast Asian Games	Hanoi, Vietnam	2nd	100 m hurdles	13.64 (w)
