= Bisa Grant =

American hurdler (born 1976)

Bisa Grant (born July 10, 1976) is an American athlete who specialized in the 100 metres hurdles. In 60 metres hurdles, she finished seventh at the 2001 IAAF World Indoor Championships in Lisbon.

Grant was an All-American sprinter for the UCLA Bruins track and field team, anchoring their 4th-place 4 × 100 meters relay team at the 1998 NCAA Division I Outdoor Track and Field Championships.

== See also ==
- Women's 100 metres hurdles world record progression
