= Maria-Joëlle Conjungo =

Central African Republic hurdler

Personal information
- Born: 14 July 1975 (age 51) Bangui, Central African Republic

Sport
- Sport: Track and field
Medal record
Representing Central African Republic
African Championships
Bronze medal – third place	2000 Algiers	100 m hurdles

Maria-Joëlle Conjungo (born 14 July 1975) is a retired athlete from the Central African Republic who specialised in the 100 metres hurdles. She competed at two consecutive Olympic Games, starting in 2000, without reaching the second round.

Her personal bests of 13.51 (100 m hurdles) and 8.38 (60 m hurdles) are current national records. Her brother, Mickaël Conjungo, is also a national record holder.

== Competition record ==
Year	Competition	Venue	Position	Event	Notes
Representing the Central African Republic
1997	Universiade	Catania, Italy	20th (h)	100 m hurdles	14.51
1999	World Indoor Championships	Maebashi, Japan	19th (h)	60 m hurdles	8.65
1999	Universiade	Palma de Mallorca, Spain	20th (h)	100 m hurdles	14.31
1999	World Championships	Seville, Spain	38th (h)	100 m hurdles	13.89
1999	All-Africa Games	Johannesburg, South Africa	8th	100 m hurdles	14.42
2000	African Championships	Algiers, Algeria	3rd	100 m hurdles	13.77
2000	Olympic Games	Sydney, Australia	35th (h)	100 m hurdles	13.95
2001	World Indoor Championships	Lisbon, Portugal	24th (h)	60 m hurdles	8.47
2003	World Championships	Paris, France	33rd (h)	100 m hurdles	13.51
2003	All-Africa Games	Abuja, Nigeria	4th	100 m hurdles	13.71
2003	Afro-Asian Games	Hyderabad, India	6th	100 m hurdles	13.94
2004	Olympic Games	Athens, Greece	36th (h)	100 m hurdles	14.24
