= Anuradha Biswal =

Indian hurdler

Personal information
- Full name: Anuradha Biswal
- Nickname: Anu
- Nationality: India
- Born: 28 March 1975 (age 51) Balasore, Odisha, India

Sport
- Country: India
- Sport: Running
- Event: 100 m hurdles
Medal record
Women's athletics
Representing India
Asian Championships
Silver medal – second place	2000 Jakarta	4×100 m
Bronze medal – third place	2000 Jakarta	100 m hurdles
South Asian Games
Gold medal – first place	2006 Colombo	100 m hurdles

Anuradha Biswal (born 28 March 1975) is an Indian former track and field athlete from Odisha who specialized in 100 metre hurdles. She previously held the national record of 13.38 seconds for 100 m hurdles, set on 26 August 2002 during the DDA-Raja Bhalendra Singh National Circuit meet held at the Nehru Stadium in Delhi. She bettered her own record of 13.40 seconds clocked at the Asian championships in Jakarta on 30 July 2000. She held the record until Jyothi Yarraji ran 13.23s on 10 May 2022. She won a bronze medal for her performance in Jakarta. She is working with NALCO in Bhubaneswar, Odisha.

== International competitions ==
Year	Competition	Venue	Position	Notes
Representing India
2000	Asian Championships	Jakarta, Indonesia	3rd	100m hurdles
2006	South Asian Games	Columbo, Sri Lanka	1st	100m hurdles
