= Su Yiping =

Chinese hurdler (born 1979)

Medal record

Women's athletics

Representing China

Asian Championships
Gold medal – first place	2000 Jakarta	100 m hurdles
Gold medal – first place	2003 Manila	100 m hurdles
Gold medal – first place	2005 Incheon	100 m hurdles
Bronze medal – third place	2000 Jakarta	4×100 m

Su Yiping (simplified Chinese: 苏懿萍; traditional Chinese: 蘇懿萍; pinyin: Sū Yìpíng; born August 4, 1979, in Changshu, Suzhou, Jiangsu) is a female Chinese hurdler. Her personal best time is 12.91 seconds, achieved in October 1999 in Huizhou.

== Competition record ==
Year	Competition	Venue	Position	Event	Notes
Representing China
2000	Asian Championships	Jakarta, Indonesia	1st	100 m hurdles	12.99
2001	World Indoor Championships	Lisbon, Portugal	19th (h)	100 m hurdles	8.34
2001	East Asian Games	Osaka, Japan	2nd	100 m hurdles	13.33
2001	Universiade	Beijing, China	1st	100 m hurdles	12.95
2002	Asian Games	Busan, South Korea	2nd	100 m hurdles	13.01
2003	World Championships	Paris, France	20th (sf)	100 m hurdles	13.20
2003	Asian Championships	Manila, Philippines	1st	100 m hurdles	13.09
2003	Afro-Asian Games	Hyderabad, India	5th	100 m hurdles	13.66
2004	Olympic Games	Athens, Greece	31st (h)	100 m hurdles	13.53
2005	Asian Championships	Incheon, South Korea	1st	100 m hurdles	13.30
2005	East Asian Games	Macau	2nd	100 m hurdles	13.44
