= Anita Trumpe =

Latvian hurdler

Personal information
- Nationality: Latvian
- Born: 6 August 1968 (age 57)

Sport
- Sport: Track and field
- Event: 100 metres hurdles

Anita Trumpe (born 6 August 1968) is a Latvian hurdler. She competed in the women's 100 metres hurdles at the 2000 Summer Olympics.
