= Deborah Edwards =

Australian hurdler

Personal information
- Nationality: Australian
- Born: 25 September 1978 (age 47)

Sport
- Sport: Track and field
- Event: 100 metres hurdles

Deborah Edwards (born 25 September 1978) is an Australian hurdler. She competed in the women's 100 metres hurdles at the 2000 Summer Olympics.
