= Lee Yeon-kyung =

South Korean hurdler (born 1981)

Medal record

Women's athletics

Representing South Korea

Asian Games
Gold medal – first place	2010 Guangzhou	100 m hurdles
Bronze medal – third place	2006 Doha	100 m hurdles

Asian Championships
Silver medal – second place	2005 Incheon	100 m hurdles
Bronze medal – third place	2007 Amman	100 m hurdles

Lee Yeon-kyung (Korean: 이연경; born 15 April 1981) is a South Korean track and field athlete who competes in the 100 metres hurdles.

She established herself at national level with back-to-back wins at the South Korean athletics championship from 1998 to 2001. Her first major international medal came at the 2005 Asian Athletics Championships held in Incheon, where she took the silver medal behind China's Su Yiping. The following year she reached the podium at the 2006 Asian Games, taking home the bronze medal in the women's hurdles. Her time of 13.23 seconds in the final was a new South Korean record for the event. She competed at the 2007 Asian Athletics Championships and won another bronze while Japan's Mami Ishino took the continental title.

Lee improved her national record in 2010, running a time of 13.12 seconds at the Colorful Daegu Pre-Championships Meeting in May. Further progress came at that year's national championships, which she won in a new best of 13 seconds exactly. Her season peaked at the 2010 Asian Games where she pipped Natalya Ivoninskaya, a Kazakh Olympian, to the gold medal in the final and became the first Korean to win the hurdles title at the games.
