= Liu Jing (hurdler) =

Chinese hurdler (born 1977)

Medal record

Women's athletics

Representing China

Asian Indoor Championships
Gold medal – first place	2008 Doha	60 m hurdles

Liu Jing (Chinese: 刘静, born 8 August 1977) is a Chinese hurdler. Her personal best time was 12.88 seconds, achieved in September 1998 in Beijing.

She won the silver medal at the 1998 Asian Games and the gold medal at the 2006 Asian Games.

From August 2001 to August 2003 she was suspended from the sport, having refused to submit to doping control during an out-of-competition test in Chengdu.

== Achievements ==
Year	Competition	Venue	Position	Event	Notes
Representing China
1997	East Asian Games	Busan, South Korea	3rd	100 m hurdles	
1998	Asian Games	Bangkok, Thailand	2nd	100 m hurdles	12.89
2006	Asian Games	Doha, Qatar	1st	100 m hurdles	12.93
2008	Asian Indoor Championships	Doha, Qatar	1st	60 m hurdles	8.31
