= Maya Shemichishina =

Ukrainian hurdler (born 1972)

Personal information
- Nationality: Ukrainian
- Born: 6 May 1972 (age 54)

Sport
- Sport: Track and field
- Event: 100 metres hurdles

Maya Petrivna Shemichishina (born 6 May 1972) is a Ukrainian hurdler. She competed in the women's 100 metres hurdles at the 2000 Summer Olympics.
