= Manuela Bosco =

Finnish actress and former hurdler

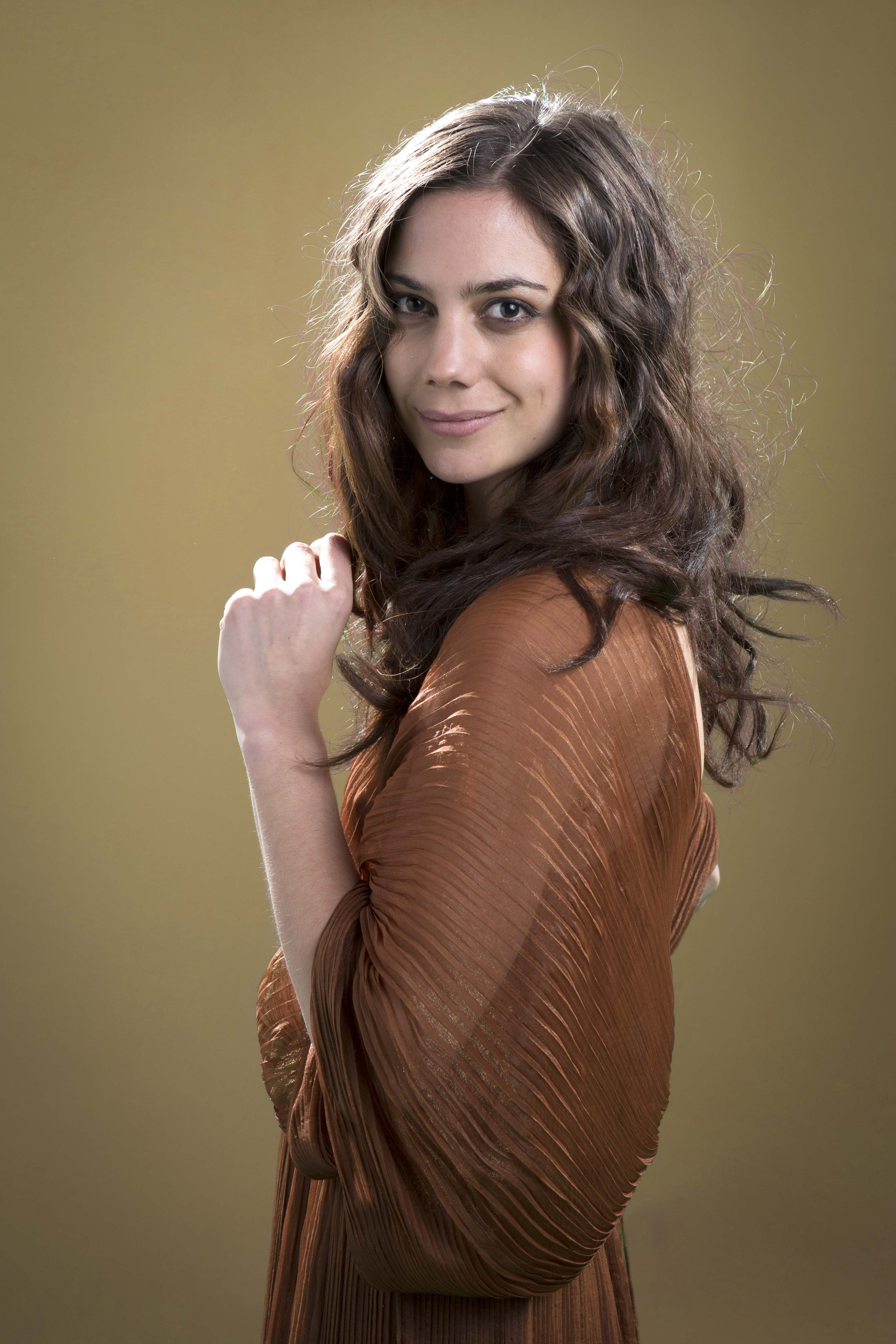
- Bosco in 2013

Personal information
- Full name: Manuela Anna Maria Bosco
- Nationality: Finnish
- Born: 11 June 1982 (age 44) Mikkeli Rural Municipality, Finland
- Height: 1.72 m (5 ft 7 1/2 in)
- Weight: 58 kg (128 lb)

Sport
- Country: Finland
- Sport: Athletics
- Event: Hurdling
- Club: Mikkelin Kilpa

Achievements and titles
- Personal best: 100 m hs: 13.29 (2000)

Manuela Bosco (born 11 June 1982) is a Finnish actress and former hurdler.

== Biography ==
Manuela Bosco, despite having dual citizenship (Italian and Finnish), chose to compete for Finland, She is the niece of the Finnish cross-country skier Harri Kirvesniemi.

In 2012, she debuted as an actress in the Finnish short movie Hankikanto, and in 2013, in the TV series Nymphs.

Bosco has two children with actor Kasimir Baltzar. She married musician Tuure Kilpeläinen in June 2018. They have a daughter born in February 2019.

== Achievements ==
Year	Competition	Venue	Position	Event	Notes
Representing Finland
1998	World Junior Championships	Annecy, France	5th	100m hurdles	13.83 (wind: -1.0 m/s)
1998	World Junior Championships	Annecy, France	4th (h)	4 × 100 m relay	45.36
2000	World Junior Championships	Santiago, Chile	14th (sf)	100m hurdles	13.69 (wind: -0.9 m/s)
2000	Olympics	Sydney	30th (h)	100 metres hurdles	13.51
2003	European U23 Championships	Bydgoszcz, Poland	9th (h)	400m hurdles	58.18

== Filmography ==
=== Film ===
Year	Title	Role	Notes
2016	Reunion 2: The Bachelor Party	Malena	

=== Television ===
Year	Title	Role	Notes
2012–present	Nymphs	Nadia Rapaccini	12 episodes
2018-2021	Deadwind	Filippa	

=== Music video ===
Year	Title	Role	Notes
2019	This Love	Unnamed character	Song by Bobby Oroza

== See also ==
- Finland at the 2000 Summer Olympics
