= Judith Vis =

Dutch hurdler, long jumper and bobsledder

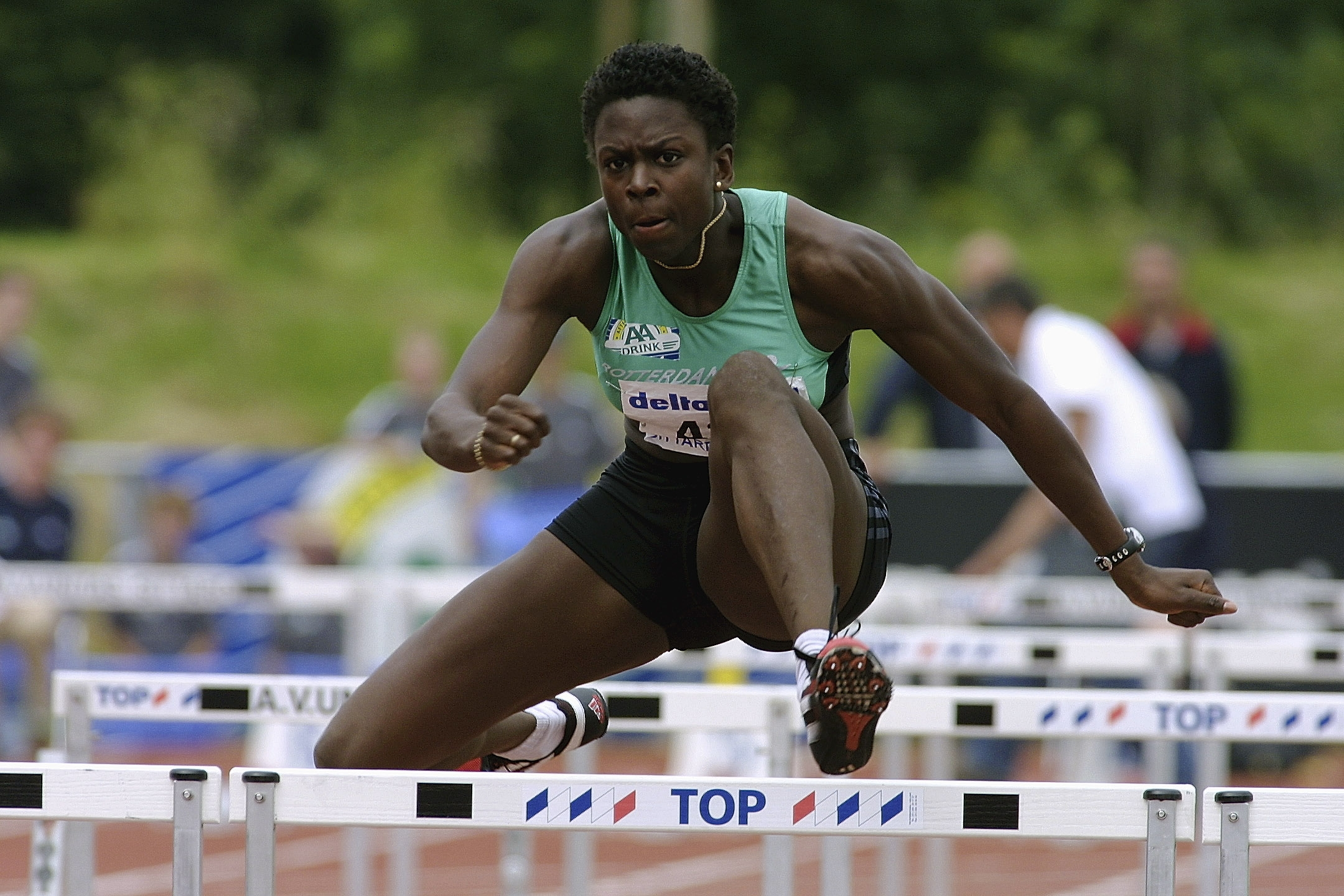
- Vis in 2002

Personal information
- Nationality: Dutch
- Born: 21 June 1980 (age 46) Rotterdam, Netherlands
- Height: 1.82 m (6 ft 0 in)
- Weight: 73 kg (161 lb)

Sport
- Country: Netherlands
- Sport: Bobsleigh
Medal record
European Championships
Bronze medal – third place	2011 Winterberg	Two-woman
Bronze medal – third place	2014 Königgsee	Two-woman

Judith Vis (Dutch: [ˈjydɪt ˈfɪs]; born 21 June 1980) is a Dutch former hurdler, long jumper and bobsledder.

Vis competed at the 2014 Winter Olympics for the Netherlands. She teamed with driver Esmé Kamphuis in the two-woman event, finishing 4th. This was the best ever result by a Dutch bobsleigh team. Vis and Kamphuis previously won a bronze medal at the 2011 Bobsleigh European Championship at Winterberg.

As of April 2014, her best showing at the World Championships is 6th, in both 2011 and 2013.

Vis made her World Cup debut in November 2010. As of April 2014, she has one World Cup podium finish, a silver medal at Cesana in 2010-11.

Vis retired from the sport after the 2014 Winter Olympics.

== World Cup podiums ==
Date	Location	Rank	Event	Teammates
5 February 2011	Cesena	2nd place, silver medalist(s)	Two-woman	Esmé Kamphuis
