= Nataliya Shekhodanova =

Russian hurdler (born 1971)

Personal information
- Nationality: Russian
- Born: 29 December 1971 (age 54) Krasnoyarsk, Russia

Sport
- Sport: Track and field
- Event: 100 metres hurdles

Nataliya Shekhodanova (born 29 December 1971) is a Russian hurdler. She competed in the 100 metres hurdles at the 1996 Summer Olympics and the 2000 Summer Olympics.

She finished seventh at the 1990 World Junior Championships and seventh at the 1996 Olympic Games. However, at the Olympics she failed a doping test for steroids. She later reached the semi-final at the 2000 Olympic Games.

Her personal best time was 12.59 seconds, achieved in July 1996 in Saint Petersburg.

== See also ==
- List of doping cases in athletics
