= Miesha McKelvy-Jones =

American hurdler (born 1976)

Personal information
- Born: July 27, 1976 (age 49) Torrance, California, United States

Sport
- Country: United States
- Sport: Hurdles
- College team: San Diego State University
Medal record
Women's athletics
World Championships
Bronze medal – third place	2003 Paris	100 m hurdles
Pan American Games
Bronze medal – third place	1999 Winnipeg	100 m hurdles

Miesha McKelvy-Jones, née Miesha McKelvy, (July 27, 1976) is a highly accomplished American hurdler known for her expertise in the 100 meters hurdles.

She won bronze medals at the Pan American Games in Winnipeg, the 2003 World Championships in Paris and the 2003 World Athletics Final in Monaco.

Her personal best time of 12.51 seconds was achieved in May 2003 in Eugene, Oregon. However, she has not competed at the top international level since 2004.
