= Anjanette Kirkland =

American hurdler (born 1974)

Personal information
- Born: February 24, 1974 (age 52) Pineville, Louisiana, U.S.
Medal record
Women's athletics
Representing United States
World Championships
Gold medal – first place	2001 Edmonton	100 m hurdles
World Indoor Championships
Gold medal – first place	2001 Lisbon	60 m hurdles

Anjanette Kirkland (born February 24, 1974) is an American hurdler.

In 2001, she won gold medals at the World Indoor Championships and the World Championships, the latter in a career best time of 12.42 seconds. She also competed at the World Championships in 1997 and 2003 without reaching the final.

Sporting positions
Preceded by (United States) Gail Devers	Women's 100m Hurdles Best Year Performance; 2001	Succeeded by (United States) Gail Devers
