= Juliane Sprenger-Afflerbach =

German hurdler

Juliane Sprenger-Afflerbach (born March 22, 1977, in Siegen) is a retired German hurdler.

She was raised in Kreuztal and competed for the athletics team LG Kindelsberg Kreuztal during her active career. She lives in Dortmund.

She finished eighth at the 2000 European Indoor Championships, and competed at the 2003 World Championships and the 2004 Olympic Games as well as the World Indoor Championships in 2001 and 2004 without reaching the finals.

Her personal best time was 12.87 seconds, achieved in July 2003 in Cuxhaven.
