= Nadine Faustin-Parker =

Haitian hurdler (born 1976)

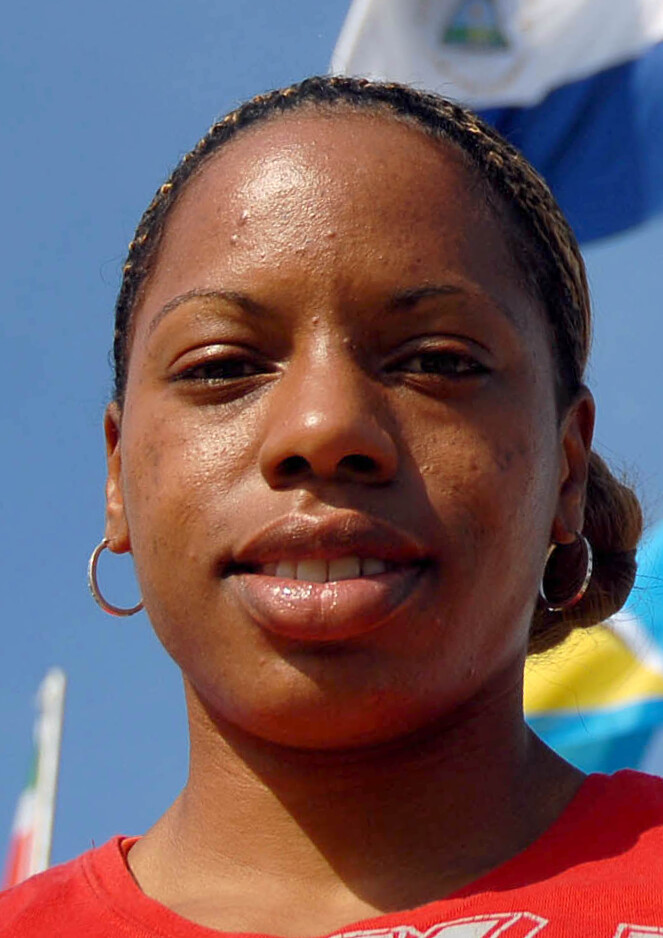
- Nadine Faustin during the 2007 Pan American Games.

Personal information
- Nationality: Haitian
- Born: April 14, 1976 (age 50) Brussels, Belgium

Sport
- Sport: Athletics
- Event: 100m hurdles
- Club: North Carolina Tar Heels

Achievements and titles
- Olympic finals: 2000, 2004, 2008
- Personal bests: 12.74 seconds (100m hurdles), 7.99 seconds (60m hurdles)
Medal record
Representing Haiti
Central American and Caribbean Games
Silver medal – second place	2006 Cartagena	100m hurdles
Bronze medal – third place	2002 San Salvador	100m hurdles
- Updated on 29 August 2016

Nadine Faustin-Parker (born 14 April 1976) is a Haitian hurdler born in Brussels, Belgium. She has represented Haiti at three Summer Olympics; (in 2000, 2004 and 2008).

She competed for the United States up to and including the 1999 indoor season, but represented Haiti at the 1999 World Championships.

She earned All-America honors at the University of North Carolina before graduating in 1999 and was inducted into the University of North Carolina Track and Field Hall of Honor in 2007.

She won the bronze medal at the 2002 Central American and Caribbean Games. She won the gold medal at the 2005 Central American and Caribbean Championships. She won the silver medal at the 2006 Central American and Caribbean Games. She also competed at the World Championships in 1999, 2001, 2003 and 2005, the World Indoor Championships in 2001, 2003, 2004 and 2006 and the Olympic Games in 2000 and 2004 without reaching the final.

Her personal best time is 12.74 seconds, achieved at the 2004 Olympic Games in Athens. This is the current Haitian record. She also holds the Haitian record for the 60 meter hurdles with 7.99 seconds.

Parker now is the Sprints and Hurdles coach for both men's and women's track at The University of Cincinnati in Cincinnati, Ohio, USA Go Bearcats!. She is credited with convincing American-born Marlena Wesh to sprint in the 2012 London Olympics for Haiti.

== Achievements ==
Year	Competition	Venue	Position	Event	Notes
Representing Haiti
2002	Central American and Caribbean Games	San Salvador, El Salvador	8th	100m	12.38 w (wind: 2.3 m/s)
2002	Central American and Caribbean Games	San Salvador, El Salvador	3rd	100m hurdles	13.84 (wind: 1.1 m/s)
