= 1987 European Athletics Indoor Championships – Women's 60 metres hurdles =

The women's 60 metres hurdles event at the 1987 European Athletics Indoor Championships was held on 21 February.

== Medalists ==
Gold	Silver	Bronze
Yordanka Donkova; Bulgaria	Gloria Uibel; East Germany	Ginka Zagorcheva; Bulgaria

== Results ==
=== Heats ===
First 3 from each heat (Q) and the next 3 fastest (q) qualified for the semifinals.

Rank	Heat	Name	Nationality	Time	Notes
1	1	Yordanka Donkova	Bulgaria	7.98	Q
2	3	Gloria Uibel	East Germany	8.00	Q
3	3	Anne Piquereau	France	8.03	Q
4	2	Lesley-Ann Skeete	Great Britain	8.06	Q, NR
5	2	Ginka Zagorcheva	Bulgaria	8.08	Q
6	3	Marjan Olyslager	Netherlands	8.10	Q, NR
7	2	Heike Theele	East Germany	8.11	Q
8	1	Isabelle Kaftandjan	France	8.12	Q
9	1	Rita Heggli	Switzerland	8.14	Q
10	3	Edith Oker	West Germany	8.18	q
11	2	Florence Colle	France	8.19	q
12	1	Claudia Zaczkiewicz	West Germany	8.20	q
13	2	Gabriele Lippe	West Germany	8.27	
14	3	Patrizia Lombardo	Italy	8.33	=NR
15	1	Sally Gunnell	Great Britain	8.35	
16	1	Sylvia Dethier	Belgium	8.36	NR
17	3	Karin Malmbratt	Sweden	8.40	

=== Semifinals ===
First 3 from each semifinal qualified directly (Q) for the final.

Rank	Heat	Name	Nationality	Time	Notes
1	1	Yordanka Donkova	Bulgaria	7.82	Q
2	2	Gloria Uibel	East Germany	7.85	Q
3	1	Ginka Zagorcheva	Bulgaria	7.93	Q
4	2	Anne Piquereau	France	7.98	Q
5	2	Marjan Olyslager	Netherlands	8.03	Q, NR
6	1	Lesley-Ann Skeete	Great Britain	8.06	Q, =NR
7	2	Heike Theele	East Germany	8.07	
8	1	Isabelle Kaftandjan	France	8.09	
9	2	Florence Colle	France	8.13	
10	2	Edith Oker	West Germany	8.13	
11	1	Rita Heggli	Switzerland	8.14	
12	1	Claudia Zaczkiewicz	West Germany	8.26	

=== Final ===
Rank	Name	Nationality	Time	Notes
1st place, gold medalist(s)	Yordanka Donkova	Bulgaria	7.79	
2nd place, silver medalist(s)	Gloria Uibel	East Germany	7.89	
3rd place, bronze medalist(s)	Ginka Zagorcheva	Bulgaria	7.92	
4	Anne Piquereau	France	8.05	
5	Lesley-Ann Skeete	Great Britain	8.07	
6	Marjan Olyslager	Netherlands	8.09	
