= Athletics at the 1985 Summer Universiade – Women's 100 metres hurdles =

The women's 100 metres hurdles event at the 1985 Summer Universiade was held at the Kobe Universiade Memorial Stadium in Kobe on 2 and 3 September 1985.

== Medalists ==
Gold	Silver	Bronze
Ginka Zagorcheva; Bulgaria	Nadezhda Korshunova; Soviet Union	Anne Piquereau; France

== Results ==
=== Heats ===
Held on 2 September

Wind:
Heat 1: ? m/s, Heat 2: -1.4 m/s, Heat 3: -3.6 m/s, Heat 4: -2.1 m/s

Rank	Heat	Athlete	Nationality	Time	Notes
1	1	Ginka Zagorcheva	Bulgaria	13.28	Q
2	2	Mihaela Pogăcean	Romania	13.33	Q
3	4	Anne Piquereau	France	13.34	Q
4	4	Nataliya Grygoryeva	Soviet Union	13.41	Q
5	2	Rita Heggli	Switzerland	13.45	Q
6	2	Marjan Olyslager	Netherlands	13.46	Q
7	3	Nadezhda Korshunova	Soviet Union	13.52	Q
8	1	Liliana Năstase	Romania	13.58	Q
9	2	Christine Sallaz	France	13.58	q
10	3	LaVonna Martin	United States	13.66	Q
11	1	Judy Simpson	Great Britain	13.67	Q
12	2	Sylvia Forgrave	Canada	13.68	q
13	4	Claudia Reidick	West Germany	13.79	Q
14	1	Heike Filsinger	West Germany	13.99	q
15	4	Rosalind Prendergraft	United States	14.04	q
16	1	Margita Papić	Yugoslavia	14.06	
17	3	Cecilia Branch	Canada	14.11	Q
18	2	Keiko Takahashi	Japan	14.27	
19	1	Zhang Jianjing	China	14.41	
20	4	Kayoko Otani	Japan	14.47	
21	4	Yasmin Saifuddin	India	15.30	

=== Semifinals ===
Held on 3 September

Wind:
Heat 1: -0.1 m/s, Heat 2: -0.4 m/s

Rank	Heat	Athlete	Nationality	Time	Notes
1	2	Ginka Zagorcheva	Bulgaria	12.96	Q
2	1	Nadezhda Korshunova	Soviet Union	12.97	Q
3	1	Anne Piquereau	France	12.98	Q
4	2	Nataliya Grygoryeva	Soviet Union	12.99	Q
5	1	Mihaela Pogăcean	Romania	13.08	Q
6	1	Marjan Olyslager	Netherlands	13.19	q
7	2	LaVonna Martin	United States	13.28	Q
8	2	Rita Heggli	Switzerland	13.30	q
9	2	Liliana Năstase	Romania	13.31	
10	2	Christine Sallaz	France	13.41	
11	2	Claudia Reidick	West Germany	13.47	
12	1	Sylvia Forgrave	Canada	13.63	
13	2	Cecilia Branch	Canada	13.67	
14	1	Heike Filsinger	West Germany	13.69	
15	1	Judy Simpson	Great Britain	13.72	
16	1	Rosalind Prendergraft	United States	13.88	

=== Final ===
Held on 3 September

Wind: +0.4 m/s

Rank	Athlete	Nationality	Time	Notes
1st place, gold medalist(s)	Ginka Zagorcheva	Bulgaria	12.71	
2nd place, silver medalist(s)	Nadezhda Korshunova	Soviet Union	12.87	
3rd place, bronze medalist(s)	Anne Piquereau	France	12.96	
4	Nataliya Grygoryeva	Soviet Union	13.04	
5	Mihaela Pogăcean	Romania	13.07	
6	Marjan Olyslager	Netherlands	13.34	
7	LaVonna Martin	United States	13.37	
8	Rita Heggli	Switzerland	13.40	
