= Athletics at the 1988 Summer Olympics – Women's 100 metres hurdles =

Women's 100 metres hurdles at the Games of the XXIV Olympiad
- Venue: Olympic Stadium
- Dates: 28 September 1988 (heats); 29 September 1988 (quarter-finals and semi-finals); 30 September 1988 (final)
- Competitors: 36 from 25 nations
- Winning time: 12.38 OR

Medalists
1st place, gold medalist(s)		Yordanka Donkova; Bulgaria
2nd place, silver medalist(s)		Gloria Siebert; East Germany
3rd place, bronze medalist(s)		Claudia Zaczkiewicz; West Germany

The Women's 100 metres Hurdles at the 1988 Summer Olympics in Seoul, South Korea had an entry list of 37 competitors, with five qualifying heats (37 runners), three second-rounds (24) and two semifinals (16) before the final (8) took place on Friday September 30, 1988.

== Medalists ==
Gold	Yordanka Donkova; Bulgaria
Silver	Gloria Siebert; East Germany
Bronze	Claudia Zackiewicz; West Germany

== Records ==
These were the standing World and Olympic records (in seconds) prior to the 1988 Summer Olympics.

World record	12.21	(Bulgaria) Yordanka Donkova	Stara Zagora (BUL)	August 20, 1988
Olympic record	12.56	(Soviet Union) Vera Komisova	Moscow (URS)	July 28, 1980

The following Olympic records were set during this competition.

Date	Athlete	Time	OR	WR
September 29, 1988	Yordanka Donkova (BUL)	12.47s	OR	
September 30, 1988	Yordanka Donkova (BUL)	12.38s	OR	

== Results ==
=== Final ===
Wind +0.2

Rank	Athlete	Nation	Time	Notes
1st place, gold medalist(s)	Yordanka Donkova	Bulgaria	12.38	OR
2nd place, silver medalist(s)	Gloria Siebert	East Germany	12.61	
3rd place, bronze medalist(s)	Claudia Zackiewicz	West Germany	12.75	
4	Nataliya Grygoryeva	Soviet Union	12.79	
5	Florence Colle	France	12.98	
6	Julie Rocheleau	Canada	12.99	
7	Monique Ewanje-Epee	France	13.14	
8	Cornelia Oschkenat	East Germany	13.73	

=== Semifinals ===
- Held on Friday 1988-09-30

Heat 1
Wind +0.5

Rank	Athlete	Nation	Time	Notes
1	Yordanka Donkova	Bulgaria	12.58	
2	Gloria Siebert	East Germany	12.60	
3	Julie Rocheleau	Canada	12.91	
4	Florence Colle	France	12.92	
5	Kerstin Knabe	East Germany	12.93	
6	Lesley-Ann Skeete	Great Britain	13.23	
7	LaVonna Martin	United States	13.29	
8	Gail Devers	United States	13.51	

Heat 2
Wind +0.5

Rank	Athlete	Nation	Time	Notes
1	Cornelia Oschkenat	East Germany	12.63	
2	Claudia Zackiewicz	West Germany	12.75	
3	Nataliya Grygoryeva	Soviet Union	12.81	
4	Monique Ewanje-Epee	France	12.95	
5	Marjan Olyslager	Netherlands	13.08	
6	Sally Gunnell	Great Britain	13.13	
7	Jacqueline Humphrey	United States	13.59	
–	Ludmila Narozhilenko	Soviet Union	DNF	

=== Quarterfinals ===
First 4 of each heat (Q) and next 4 fastest (q) qualified for the semifinals.

Wind: Heat 1 +1.3, Heat 2 +0.2, Heat 3 +1.0

Rank	Heat	Athlete	Nation	Time	Notes
1	1	Yordanka Donkova	Bulgaria	12.47	Q
2	1	Ludmila Narozhilenko	Soviet Union	12.62	Q
3	2	Cornelia Oschkenat	East Germany	12.69	Q
4	3	Gloria Siebert	East Germany	12.74	Q
5	1	Kerstin Knabe	East Germany	12.81	Q
6	3	Claudia Zackiewicz	West Germany	12.87	Q
7	2	Nataliya Grygoryeva	Soviet Union	12.89	Q
8	1	Julie Rocheleau	Canada	12.90	Q
9	1	Florence Colle	France	13.00	q
10	2	Marjan Olyslager	Netherlands	13.02	Q
11	3	Sally Gunnell	Great Britain	13.04	Q
12	2	Monique Ewanje-Epee	France	13.10	Q
13	2	LaVonna Martin	United States	13.20	q
14	3	Gail Devers-Roberts	United States	13.22	Q
15	1	Jacqueline Humphrey	United States	13.25	q
16	1	Lesley-Ann Skeete	Great Britain	13.27	q
17	2	Wendy Jeal	Great Britain	13.32	
18	3	Gretha Tromp	Netherlands	13.42	
19	2	Du Juan	China	13.58	
20	2	Rita Heggli	Switzerland	13.95	
21	3	Liu Huajin	China	14.37	
	3	Anne Piquereau	France	DNF	
	3	Maria Usifo	Nigeria	DNF	
	1	Jane Flemming	Australia	DNS	

=== Heats ===
First 4 of each heat (Q) and next 4 fastest (q) qualified for the quarterfinals.

Wind: Heat 1 -0.3, Heat 2 +0.1, Heat 3 +0.5, Heat 4 +1.4, Heat 5 +0.8

Rank	Heat	Athlete	Nation	Time	Notes
1	2	Gloria Siebert	East Germany	12.65	Q
2	4	Cornelia Oschkenat	East Germany	12.72	Q
3	2	Ludmila Narozhilenko	Soviet Union	12.76	Q
4	5	Yordanka Donkova	Bulgaria	12.89	Q
5	1	Nataliya Grygoryeva	Soviet Union	12.96	Q
6	2	Claudia Zackiewicz	West Germany	13.00	Q
7	4	Liu Huajin	China	13.02	Q
8	3	Marjan Olyslager	Netherlands	13.04	Q
9	3	Julie Rocheleau	Canada	13.07	Q
10	1	Kerstin Knabe	East Germany	13.13	Q
11	4	Gail Devers-Roberts	United States	13.18	Q
12	4	Monique Ewanje-Epee	France	13.18	Q
13	1	LaVonna Martin	United States	13.20	Q
14	2	Jacqueline Humphrey	United States	13.24	Q
15	5	Sally Gunnell	Great Britain	13.26	Q
16	1	Florence Colle	France	13.32	Q
16	4	Wendy Jeal	Great Britain	13.32	q
18	3	Lesley-Ann Skeete	Great Britain	13.38	Q
19	4	Gretha Tromp	Netherlands	13.48	q
20	2	Maria Usifo	Nigeria	13.50	q
21	5	Du Juan	China	13.51	Q
22	1	Jane Flemming	Australia	13.53	q
23	5	Anne Piquereau	France	13.56	Q
24	2	Dinah Yankey	Ghana	13.64	
25	3	Rita Heggli	Switzerland	13.72	Q
26	1	Sandra Taváres	Mexico	13.81	
27	4	Bang Sin-hye	South Korea	13.84	
28	5	Nancy Vallecilla	Ecuador	13.97	
29	3	Chen Wen-Ing	Chinese Taipei	14.01	
30	4	Cheung Suet Yee	Hong Kong	14.26	
31	3	Agrippina de la Cruz	Philippines	14.36	
32	5	Manuela Marxer	Liechtenstein	14.38	
33	1	Sainiana Tukana	Fiji	15.50	
	3	Ginka Zagorcheva	Bulgaria	DNF	
	2	Sylvia Dethier	Belgium	DQ	
	5	Tilaka Jinadasa	Sri Lanka	DQ	
	5	Michele Johnson	Saint Vincent and the Grenadines	DNS	

== See also ==
- 1986 European World Championships 100m Hurdles (Stuttgart)
- 1987 Women's World Championships 100m Hurdles (Rome)
- 1990 European World Championships 100m Hurdles (Split)
- 1991 Women's World Championships 100m Hurdles (Tokyo)
- 1992 Women's Olympic 100m Hurdles (Barcelona)
