= 1988 European Athletics Indoor Championships – Women's 60 metres hurdles =

The women's 60 metres hurdles event at the 1988 European Athletics Indoor Championships was held on 5 March.

== Medalists ==
| Gold | Silver | Bronze |
|---|---|---|
| Cornelia Oschkenat; East Germany | Marjan Olyslager; Netherlands | Mihaela Pogăcean; Romania |

== Results ==
=== Heats ===
First 2 from each heat (Q) and the next 4 fastest (q) qualified for the semifinals.

| Rank | Heat | Name | Nationality | Time | Notes |
|---|---|---|---|---|---|
| 1 | 1 | Mihaela Pogăcean | Romania | 7.98 | Q |
| 1 | 4 | Cornelia Oschkenat | East Germany | 7.98 | Q |
| 3 | 4 | Eva Sokolova | Soviet Union | 7.99 | Q |
| 4 | 2 | Ginka Zagorcheva | Bulgaria | 8.00 | Q |
| 5 | 2 | Laurence Elloy | France | 8.02 | Q |
| 6 | 1 | Marjan Olyslager | Netherlands | 8.05 | Q |
| 6 | 4 | Florence Colle | France | 8.05 | q |
| 8 | 3 | Rita Heggli | Switzerland | 8.09 | Q |
| 9 | 3 | Claudia Zaczkiewicz | West Germany | 8.12 | Q |
| 10 | 1 | Ulrike Kleindl | Austria | 8.23 | q |
| 11 | 4 | Gabriele Lippe | West Germany | 8.28 | q |
| 12 | 2 | Jitka Tesárková | Czechoslovakia | 8.36 | q |
| 12 | 3 | Anne Piquereau | France | 8.36 | |
| 14 | 1 | Mary Massarin | Italy | 8.40 | |
| 15 | 2 | Carla Tuzzi | Italy | 8.52 | |
| | 1 | Kerstin Knabe | East Germany | DNF | |
| | 3 | Sabine Seitl | Austria | DNF | |

=== Semifinals ===
First 3 from each semifinal qualified directly (Q) for the final.

| Rank | Heat | Name | Nationality | Time | Notes |
|---|---|---|---|---|---|
| 1 | 1 | Cornelia Oschkenat | East Germany | 7.83 | Q |
| 2 | 2 | Mihaela Pogăcean | Romania | 7.86 | Q, NR |
| 3 | 1 | Laurence Elloy | France | 7.92 | Q |
| 4 | 2 | Marjan Olyslager | Netherlands | 7.95 | Q |
| 5 | 1 | Ginka Zagorcheva | Bulgaria | 7.97 | Q |
| 5 | 2 | Florence Colle | France | 7.97 | Q |
| 5 | 2 | Eva Sokolova | Soviet Union | 7.97 | |
| 8 | 1 | Claudia Zaczkiewicz | West Germany | 7.98 | |
| 9 | 1 | Rita Heggli | Switzerland | 8.07 | |
| 10 | 1 | Jitka Tesárková | Czechoslovakia | 8.31 | |
| 10 | 2 | Ulrike Kleindl | Austria | 8.31 | |
| 12 | 2 | Gabriele Lippe | West Germany | 8.37 | |

=== Final ===
| Rank | Lane | Name | Nationality | Time | Notes |
|---|---|---|---|---|---|
| 1st place, gold medalist(s) | 3 | Cornelia Oschkenat | East Germany | 7.77 | |
| 2nd place, silver medalist(s) | 5 | Marjan Olyslager | Netherlands | 7.92 | |
| 3rd place, bronze medalist(s) | 2 | Mihaela Pogăcean | Romania | 7.92 | |
| 4 | 6 | Ginka Zagorcheva | Bulgaria | 7.95 | |
| 5 | 4 | Laurence Elloy | France | 7.95 | |
| 6 | 1 | Florence Colle | France | 8.02 | |
