= 1987 World Championships in Athletics – Women's 100 metres hurdles =

These are the official results of the Women's 100 metres Hurdles event at the 1987 IAAF World Championships in Rome, Italy. There were a total number of 26 participating athletes, with four qualifying heats, two semi-finals and the final held on Friday September 4, 1987.

== Medalists ==
Gold	Ginka Zagorcheva; Bulgaria (BUL)
Silver	Gloria Uibel-Siebert; East Germany (GDR)
Bronze	Cornelia Oschkenat; East Germany (GDR)

== Final ==
RANK	FINAL wind -0.5	TIME
	Ginka Zagorcheva (BUL)	12.34 CR
	Gloria Uibel-Siebert (GDR)	12.44
	Cornelia Oschkenat (GDR)	12.46
4.	Yordanka Donkova (BUL)	12.49
5.	Anne Piquereau (FRA)	12.82
6.	Laurence Elloy (FRA)	12.83
7.	Claudia Zackiewicz (FRG)	12.98
8.	LaVonna Martin (USA)	13.06

== Semi-finals ==
- Held on Friday 1987-09-04

RANK	HEAT 1 wind -0.2	TIME
1.	Cornelia Oschkenat (GDR)	12.65
2.	Ginka Zagorcheva (BUL)	12.75
3.	LaVonna Martin (USA)	12.94
4.	Anne Piquereau (FRA)	12.95
5.	Florence Colle (FRA)	13.04
6.	Sally Gunnell (GBR)	13.06
7.	Rita Heggli (SUI)	13.20
8.	Nancy Vallecilla (ECU)	13.28

RANK	HEAT 2 wind -0.9	TIME
1.	Gloria Uibel-Siebert (GDR)	12.68
2.	Yordanka Donkova (BUL)	12.76
3.	Laurence Elloy (FRA)	12.88
4.	Claudia Zackiewicz (FRG)	13.01
5.	Stephanie Hightower (USA)	13.12
6.	Sophia Hunter (USA)	13.26
7.	Aliuska López (CUB)	13.31
8.	Patrizia Lombardo (ITA)	13.38

== Qualifying heats ==
- Held on Thursday 1987-09-03

RANK	HEAT 1 wind -1.0	TIME
1.	Ginka Zagorcheva (BUL)	12.51
2.	Anne Piquereau (FRA)	13.24
3.	Aliuska López (CUB)	13.24
4.	Rita Heggli (SUI)	13.32
5.	Wendy Jeal (GBR)	13.41
6.	Diana Yankey (GHA)	13.90
7.	Helga Halldorsdottir (ISL)	13.97

RANK	HEAT 2 wind -0.8	TIME
1.	Yordanka Donkova (BUL)	12.97
2.	Florence Colle (FRA)	13.20
3.	Stephanie Hightower (USA)	13.22
4.	Nancy Vallecilla (ECU)	13.30
5.	Lesley-Ann Skeete (GBR)	13.40
6.	Tiina Lindgren (FIN)	13.76
7.	Chen Wen-Ing (TPE)	14.12

RANK	HEAT 3 wind -0.8	TIME
1.	Cornelia Oschkenat (GDR)	12.83
2.	Sally Gunnell (GBR)	13.02
3.	LaVonna Martin (USA)	13.19
4.	Patrizia Lombardo (ITA)	13.25
5.	Karin Malmbratt (SWE)	13.45
6.	Karen Nelson (CAN)	13.60

RANK	HEAT 4 wind -1.6	TIME
1.	Gloria Uibel-Siebert (GDR)	12.81
2.	Laurence Elloy (FRA)	13.08
3.	Claudia Zackiewicz (FRG)	13.15
4.	Sophia Hunter (USA)	13.19
5.	Feng Yinghua (CHN)	13.85
6.	Sandra Taváres (MEX)	13.86
