= 1986 European Athletics Indoor Championships – Women's 60 metres hurdles =

The women's 60 metres hurdles event at the 1986 European Athletics Indoor Championships was held on 22 and 23 February.

== Medalists ==
Gold	Silver	Bronze
Cornelia Oschkenat; East Germany	Anne Piquereau; France	Kerstin Knabe; East Germany

== Results ==
=== Heats ===
First 2 from each heat (Q) and the next 6 fastest (q) qualified for the semifinals.

Rank	Heat	Name	Nationality	Time	Notes
1	1	Cornelia Oschkenat	East Germany	7.91	Q
2	3	Laurence Elloy	France	7.93	Q
3	3	Ulrike Denk	West Germany	7.98	Q
4	1	Anne Piquereau	France	8.00	Q
5	3	Kerstin Knabe	East Germany	8.01	q
6	3	Nadezhda Korshunova	Soviet Union	8.07	q
7	3	Monique Éwanjé-Épée	France	8.09	q
8	2	Sabine Braun	West Germany	8.12	Q
9	1	Ginka Zagorcheva	Bulgaria	8.16	q
10	2	Yordanka Donkova	Bulgaria	8.17	Q
11	1	Rita Heggli	Switzerland	8.20	q
12	2	Vera Akimova	Soviet Union	8.28	q
13	1	Jitka Tesárková	Czechoslovakia	8.31	
14	1	Lesley-Ann Skeete	Great Britain	8.40	
15	2	Patrizia Lombardo	Italy	8.44	
16	2	Ana Isabel Oliveira	Portugal	8.73	
17	3	María José Mardomingo	Spain	8.77	
	2	Mihaela Pogacian	Romania	DNF	

=== Semifinals ===
First 3 from each semifinal qualified directly (Q) for the final.

Rank	Heat	Name	Nationality	Time	Notes
1	1	Cornelia Oschkenat	East Germany	7.84	Q
2	2	Laurence Elloy	France	7.86	Q
3	2	Kerstin Knabe	East Germany	7.89	Q
4	2	Ulrike Denk	West Germany	7.93	Q
5	1	Anne Piquereau	France	7.94	Q
6	1	Yordanka Donkova	Bulgaria	8.00	Q
7	1	Nadezhda Korshunova	Soviet Union	8.01	
8	2	Ginka Zagorcheva	Bulgaria	8.02	
9	2	Vera Akimova	Soviet Union	8.05	
10	2	Monique Éwanjé-Épée	France	8.06	=AJR
11	1	Sabine Braun	West Germany	8.13	
12	1	Rita Heggli	Switzerland	8.18	

=== Final ===
Rank	Name	Nationality	Time	Notes
1st place, gold medalist(s)	Cornelia Oschkenat	East Germany	7.79	
2nd place, silver medalist(s)	Anne Piquereau	France	7.89	
3rd place, bronze medalist(s)	Kerstin Knabe	East Germany	7.90	
4	Ulrike Denk	West Germany	7.91	PB
5	Laurence Elloy	France	7.94	
6	Yordanka Donkova	Bulgaria	8.09	
