= Athletics at the 1987 Summer Universiade – Women's 100 metres hurdles =

The women's 100 metres hurdles event at the 1987 Summer Universiade was held at the Stadion Maksimir in Zagreb on 15 and 16 July 1987.

== Medalists ==
Gold	Silver	Bronze
Heike Theele; East Germany	Aliuska López; Cuba	Florence Colle; France

== Results ==
=== Heats ===
Held on 15 July

Wind:
Heat 1: -2.2 m/s, Heat 2: -0.5 m/s, Heat 3: -0.9 m/s, Heat 4: ? m/s

Rank	Heat	Athlete	Nationality	Time	Notes
1	2	LaVonna Martin	United States	13.08	Q
2	3	Sophia Hunter	United States	13.18	Q
3	3	Florence Colle	France	13.21	Q
4	4	Heike Theele	East Germany	13.23	Q
5	2	Anne Piquereau	France	13.28	Q
6	1	Liliana Năstase	Romania	13.34	Q
7	2	Aliuska López	Cuba	13.35	Q
8	3	Kristin Patzwahl	East Germany	13.36	Q
9	1	Rita Heggli	Switzerland	13.40	Q
10	4	Lesley-Ann Skeete	Great Britain	13.42	Q
11	3	Nataliya Grygoryeva	Soviet Union	13.44	q
12	2	Xiao Zifang	China	13.62	q
13	3	Ulrike Kleindl	Austria	13.73	q
14	4	Maria Usifo	Nigeria	13.74	Q
15	4	Lidiya Okolo-Kulak	Soviet Union	13.74	q
16	1	Julie Rocheleau	Canada	13.85	Q
17	2	Margita Papić	Yugoslavia	14.01	
18	1	Carla Tuzzi	Italy	14.06	
19	4	Yolanda Jones	Canada	14.16	
20	1	Manuela Marxer	Liechtenstein	14.55	
21	3	Sandra Govinden	Mauritius	14.60	
22	2	Estela Kelly	Panama	15.37	
23	1	Françoise Mistoul	Gabon	15.74	
24	4	Ghazala Naheed	Pakistan	16.92	

=== Semifinals ===
Held on 16 July

Wind:
Heat 1: -0.3 m/s, Heat 2: 0.0 m/s, Heat 3: -0.9 m/s, Heat 4: ? m/s

Rank	Heat	Athlete	Nationality	Time	Notes
1	1	Heike Theele	East Germany	12.83	Q
2	1	LaVonna Martin	United States	12.86	Q
3	1	Aliuska López	Cuba	12.88	Q, WJR
4	1	Florence Colle	France	12.99	Q
5	2	Sophia Hunter	United States	13.03	Q
6	2	Anne Piquereau	France	13.05	Q
7	2	Kristin Patzwahl	East Germany	13.11	Q
8	1	Lesley-Ann Skeete	Great Britain	13.12	
9	1	Nataliya Grygoryeva	Soviet Union	13.24	
10	2	Lidiya Okolo-Kulak	Soviet Union	13.26	Q
11	2	Liliana Năstase	Romania	13.32	
12	2	Rita Heggli	Switzerland	13.44	
13	2	Julie Rocheleau	Canada	13.49	
14	2	Xiao Zifang	China	13.50	
15	1	Maria Usifo	Nigeria	13.54	
16	1	Ulrike Kleindl	Austria	13.66	

=== Final ===
Held on 16 July

Wind: +1.5 m/s

Rank	Lane	Athlete	Nationality	Time	Notes
1st place, gold medalist(s)	3	Heike Theele	East Germany	12.84	
2nd place, silver medalist(s)	4	Aliuska López	Cuba	12.84	WJR
3rd place, bronze medalist(s)	6	Florence Colle	France	12.84	
4	5	LaVonna Martin	United States	12.85	
5	1	Anne Piquereau	France	12.89	
6	2	Sophia Hunter	United States	12.96	
7	7	Lidiya Okolo-Kulak	Soviet Union	13.21	
8	8	Kristin Patzwahl	East Germany	13.39	
