= 1985 IAAF World Indoor Games – Women's 60 metres hurdles =

The women's 60 metres hurdles event at the 1985 IAAF World Indoor Games was held at the Palais Omnisports Paris-Bercy on 18 January.

== Medalists ==
Gold	Silver	Bronze
Xénia Siska; Hungary	Laurence Elloy; France	Anne Piquereau; France

== Results ==
=== Heats ===
First 3 of each heat (Q) and next 3 fastest (q) qualified for the semifinals.

Rank	Heat	Name	Nationality	Time	Notes
1	1	Anne Piquereau	France	8.12	Q
2	1	Xénia Siska	Hungary	8.13	Q
3	2	Ginka Zagorcheva	Bulgaria	8.16	Q
3	3	Vera Akimova	Soviet Union	8.16	Q
5	1	Stephanie Hightower	United States	8.17	Q
6	2	Laurence Elloy	France	8.22	Q
7	1	Judy Simpson	Great Britain	8.34	q
7	3	Wendy Jeal	Great Britain	8.34	Q
9	2	Beatriz Capotosto	Argentina	8.52	Q
10	3	Angela Weiss	Switzerland	8.56	Q
11	1	Hilde Frederiksen	Norway	8.58	q
12	2	Awa Dioum-Ndiaye	Senegal	8.76	q, NR
13	1	Sandra Tavárez	Mexico	8.86	NR
14	3	Pam Page	United States	8.95	
15	2	Cheung Suet Yee	Hong Kong	9.09	NR
16	3	Giannina Otoya	Peru	11.04	

=== Semifinals ===
First 3 of each semifinal (Q) qualified directly for the final.

Rank	Heat	Name	Nationality	Time	Notes
1	1	Anne Piquereau	France	8.00	Q
1	2	Xénia Siska	Hungary	8.00	Q, NR
3	2	Laurence Elloy	France	8.01	Q
4	2	Vera Akimova	Soviet Union	8.04	Q
5	1	Ginka Zagorcheva	Bulgaria	8.10	Q
6	1	Stephanie Hightower	United States	8.22	Q
7	1	Wendy Jeal	Great Britain	8.37	
8	2	Judy Simpson	Great Britain	8.46	
9	1	Beatriz Capotosto	Argentina	8.47	NR
10	2	Angela Weiss	Switzerland	8.48	
11	2	Hilde Frederiksen	Norway	8.54	
12	1	Awa Dioum-Ndiaye	Senegal	8.77	

=== Final ===
Rank	Lane	Name	Nationality	Time	Notes
1st place, gold medalist(s)	2	Xénia Siska	Hungary	8.03	
2nd place, silver medalist(s)	6	Laurence Elloy	France	8.08	
3rd place, bronze medalist(s)	4	Anne Piquereau	France	8.10	
4	1	Stephanie Hightower	United States	8.12	
5	5	Ginka Zagorcheva	Bulgaria	8.13	
6	3	Vera Akimova	Soviet Union	8.14	
