= 1987 IAAF World Indoor Championships – Women's 60 metres hurdles =

The women's 60 metres hurdles event at the 1987 IAAF World Indoor Championships was held at the Hoosier Dome in Indianapolis on 6 and 7 March.

== Medalists ==
Gold	Silver	Bronze
Cornelia Oschkenat; East Germany	Yordanka Donkova; Bulgaria	Ginka Zagorcheva; Bulgaria

== Results ==
=== Heats ===
The first 2 of each heat (Q) and next 4 fastest (q) qualified for the final.

Rank	Heat	Name	Nationality	Time	Notes
1	2	Cornelia Oschkenat	East Germany	7.87	Q
2	2	Yordanka Donkova	Bulgaria	7.96	Q
3	1	Ginka Zagorcheva	Bulgaria	7.99	Q
4	2	Stephanie Hightower	United States	8.10	q
5	2	Lesley-Ann Skeete	Great Britain	8.11	q
6	1	Rita Heggli	Switzerland	8.12	Q
7	2	Marjan Olijslager	Netherlands	8.15	q
8	2	Aliuska López	Cuba	8.18	q, NR
9	1	Feng Yinghua	China	8.41	
10	1	Jackie Joyner-Kersee	United States	8.62	
11	1	Patrizia Lombardo	Italy	8.65	
12	1	Maria Usifo	Nigeria	9.23	NR
	1	Flora Hyacinth	United States Virgin Islands	DNS	

=== Final ===
Rank	Lane	Name	Nationality	Time	Notes
1st place, gold medalist(s)	5	Cornelia Oschkenat	East Germany	7.82	CR
2nd place, silver medalist(s)	6	Yordanka Donkova	Bulgaria	7.85	
3rd place, bronze medalist(s)	4	Ginka Zagorcheva	Bulgaria	7.99	
4	3	Rita Heggli	Switzerland	8.11	
5	1	Marjan Olijslager	Netherlands	8.12	
6	2	Lesley-Ann Skeete	Great Britain	8.18	
7	8	Aliuska López	Cuba	8.25	
8	7	Stephanie Hightower	United States	8.26	
