= 1988 IAAF Grand Prix Final =

- Host city: West Berlin
- Events: 17
- Dates: 26 August
- Main venue: Olympiastadion

The 1988 IAAF Grand Prix Final was the fourth edition of the season-ending competition for the IAAF Grand Prix track and field circuit, organised by the International Association of Athletics Federations. It was held on 26 August at the Olympiastadion in West Berlin. Saïd Aouita (5000 metres) and Paula Ivan (1500 metres) were the overall points winners of the tournament, with this being Aouita's second win at the completion following his 1986 victory.

== Medal summary ==
=== Men ===
Event	Gold		Silver		Bronze	
100 metres (wind: +3.0 m/s)	Calvin Smith (USA)	10.12w	Chidi Imoh (NGR)	10.16w	Brian Cooper (USA)	10.16w
800 metres	Tom McKean (GBR)	1:47.60	Sebastian Coe (GBR)	1:47.87	Dieudonné Kwizera (BDI)	1:48.25
One mile	Saïd Aouita (MAR)	3:56.21	Jim Spivey (USA)	3:56.55	José Luis González (ESP)	3:56.67
5000 metres	José Regalo (POR)	13:22.20	Eamonn Martin (GBR)	13:22.88	Domingos Castro (POR)	13:24.03
3000 metres steeplechase	Julius Kariuki (KEN)	8:24.52	Patrick Sang (KEN)	8:25.27	Peter Koech (KEN)	8:27.09
400 m hurdles	Danny Harris (USA)	49.29	Amadou Dia Bâ (SEN)	49.50	Dave Patrick (USA)	49.54
High jump	Patrik Sjöberg (SWE)	2.33 m	Javier Sotomayor (CUB)	2.30 m	Rudolf Povarnitsyn (URS)	2.27 m
Triple jump	Mike Conley, Sr. (USA)	17.59 m	Oleg Protsenko (URS)	17.39 m	Robert Cannon (USA)	16.87 m
Shot put	Helmut Krieger (POL)	20.79 m	Ron Backes (USA)	19.96 m	Georg Andersen (NOR)	19.70 m
Hammer throw	Igor Astapkovich (URS)	81.26 m	Tibor Gécsek (HUN)	79.72 m	Christoph Sahner (FRG)	77.96 m

=== Women ===
Event	Gold		Silver		Bronze	
200 metres	Grace Jackson (JAM)	22.70	Mary Onyali (NGR)	22.80	Pauline Davis (BAH)	23.12
400 metres	Ana Fidelia Quirot (CUB)	50.27	Jillian Richardson (CAN)	50.52	Grace Jackson (JAM)	51.11
1500 metres	Paula Ivan (ROM)	4:00.24	Mitica Constantin (ROM)	4:04.97	Elly van Hulst (NED)	4:06.52
5000 metres	Liz McColgan (GBR)	15:03.29	Ingrid Kristiansen (NOR)	15:10.89	Jill Hunter (GBR)	15:17.77
100 m hurdles	Claudia Zaczkiewicz (FRG)	12.93	Ulrike Denk (FRG)	12.96	Marjan Olyslager (NED)	13.05
Discus throw	Hilda Ramos (CUB)	66.58 m	Dagmar Galler (FRG)	61.72 m	Maritza Martén (CUB)	60.88 m
Javelin throw	Manuela Alizadeh (FRG)	62.52 m	Beate Peters (FRG)	62.14 m	Ingrid Thyssen (FRG)	61.70 m

== Points leaders ==
=== Men ===
Event	Gold		Silver		Bronze	
Overall	Saïd Aouita (MAR)	63	Mike Conley, Sr. (USA)	61	Danny Harris (USA)	58
100 metres	Chidi Imoh (NGR)	55	Brian Cooper (USA)	46	Calvin Smith (USA)	43
800 metres	Tom McKean (GBR)	48	Saïd Aouita (MAR)	45	Moussa Fall (SEN)	45
One mile	Saïd Aouita (MAR)	54	Jim Spivey (USA)	39	Sydney Maree (USA)	36
5000 metres	Eamonn Martin (GBR)	39	Brahim Boutayeb (MAR)	37	José Regalo (POR)	36
3000 metres steeplechase	Julius Kariuki (KEN)	48	Peter Koech (KEN)	46	Patrick Sang (KEN)	43
400 m hurdles	Danny Harris (USA)	58	Amadou Dia Bâ (SEN)	51	Nat Page (USA)	37
High jump	Javier Sotomayor (CUB)	57	Patrik Sjöberg (SWE)	44	Sorin Matei (ROM)	36.5
Triple jump	Mike Conley, Sr. (USA)	61	Oleg Protsenko (URS)	55	Juan Miguel López (CUB)	46
Shot put	Remigius Machura (TCH)	51	Ron Backes (USA)	50	Georg Andersen (NOR)	46
Hammer throw	Tibor Gécsek (HUN)	48	Igor Astapkovich (URS)	31	Igor Nikulin (URS)	29

=== Women ===
Event	Gold		Silver		Bronze	
Overall	Paula Ivan (ROM)	63	Grace Jackson (JAM)	63	Ana Fidelia Quirot (CUB)	57
200 metres	Grace Jackson (JAM)	63	Dannette Young (USA)	49	Mary Onyali (NGR)	48
400 metres	Ana Fidelia Quirot (CUB)	57	Grace Jackson (JAM)	48	Jillian Richardson (CAN)	44
1500 metres	Paula Ivan (ROM)	63	Mitica Constantin (ROM)	47	Elly van Hulst (NED)	41
5000 metres	Liz McColgan (GBR)	51	Annette Sergent (FRA)	32	Iulia Besliu (ROM)	28
100 m hurdles	Claudia Zaczkiewicz (FRG)	50	Yordanka Donkova (BUL)	45	Laurence Elloy (FRA)	42.5
Discus throw	Hilda Ramos (CUB)	42	Maritza Martén (CUB)	38	Tsvetanka Khristova (BUL)	23
Javelin throw	Manuela Alizadeh (FRG)	46	Petra Felke (GDR)	45	Ivonne Leal (CUB)	41
