= 1986 European Athletics Championships – Women's 100 metres hurdles =

Women's 100 metres hurdles at the European Athletics Championships

The women's 100 metres hurdles event at the 1986 European Athletics Championships was held in Stuttgart, then West Germany, at Neckarstadion on 27, 28, and 29 August 1986.

== Medalists ==
Gold	Yordanka Donkova; Bulgaria
Silver	Cornelia Oschkenat; East Germany
Bronze	Ginka Zagorcheva; Bulgaria

== Results ==
=== Final ===
29 August Wind: -0.7 m/s

Rank	Name	Nationality	Time	Notes
1st place, gold medalist(s)	Yordanka Donkova	Bulgaria	12.38	CR
2nd place, silver medalist(s)	Cornelia Oschkenat	East Germany	12.55	
3rd place, bronze medalist(s)	Ginka Zagorcheva	Bulgaria	12.70	
4	Heike Theele	East Germany	12.82	
4	Kerstin Knabe	East Germany	12.82	
6	Laurence Elloy	France	12.93	
7	Natalya Grigoryeva	Soviet Union	12.96	
8	Mihaela Pogăcean	Romania	13.17	

=== Semi-finals ===
28 August

==== Semi-final 1 ====
Wind: 0 m/s

Rank	Name	Nationality	Time	Notes
1	Laurence Elloy	France	12.80	Q
2	Heike Theele	East Germany	12.82	Q
3	Mihaela Pogăcean	Romania	12.84	Q
4	Ginka Zagorcheva	Bulgaria	12.86	Q
5	Vera Akimova	Soviet Union	12.87	
6	Rita Heggli	Switzerland	13.13	NR
7	Yelena Politika	Soviet Union	13.29	
	Marjan Olyslager	Netherlands	DNF	

==== Semi-final 2 ====
Wind: 0.1 m/s

Rank	Name	Nationality	Time	Notes
1	Yordanka Donkova	Bulgaria	12.49	Q
2	Cornelia Oschkenat	East Germany	12.52	Q
3	Natalya Grigoryeva	Soviet Union	12.75	Q
4	Kerstin Knabe	East Germany	12.84	Q
5	Xénia Siska	Hungary	12.90	
6	Wendy Jeal	United Kingdom	13.29	
7	Monique Éwanjé-Épée	France	13.39	
	Anne Piquereau	France	DQ	

=== Heats ===
27 August

==== Heat 1 ====
Wind: 1.2 m/s

Rank	Name	Nationality	Time	Notes
1	Mihaela Pogăcean	Romania	12.84	Q
2	Heike Theele	East Germany	12.84	Q
3	Laurence Elloy	France	12.87	Q
4	Natalya Grigoryeva	Soviet Union	12.88	Q
5	Wendy Jeal	United Kingdom	13.16	q
6	Patrizia Lombardo	Italy	13.51	
	Dorthe Wolfsberg	Denmark	DQ	

==== Heat 2 ====
Wind: 2 m/s

Rank	Name	Nationality	Time	Notes
1	Cornelia Oschkenat	East Germany	12.56	Q
2	Ginka Zagorcheva	Bulgaria	12.58	Q
3	Yelena Politika	Soviet Union	12.95	Q
4	Xénia Siska	Hungary	12.95	Q
5	Monique Éwanjé-Épée	France	13.16	q
6	Rita Heggli	Switzerland	13.19	q
7	Claudia Zaczkiewicz	West Germany	13.26	

==== Heat 3 ====
Wind: 0 m/s

Rank	Name	Nationality	Time	Notes
1	Yordanka Donkova	Bulgaria	12.66	Q
2	Kerstin Knabe	East Germany	12.85	Q
3	Anne Piquereau	France	12.96	Q
4	Vera Akimova	Soviet Union	13.05	Q
5	Marjan Olyslager	Netherlands	13.14	q
6	Sally Gunnell	United Kingdom	13.22	
7	Edith Oker	West Germany	13.76	

== Participation ==
According to an unofficial count, 21 athletes from 12 countries participated in the event.

- Bulgaria (2)
- Denmark (1)
- East Germany (3)
- France (3)
- Hungary (1)
- Italy (1)
- Netherlands (1)
- Romania (1)
- Soviet Union (3)
- Switzerland (1)
- United Kingdom (2)
- West Germany (2)
