= 1989 IAAF World Indoor Championships – Women's 60 metres hurdles =

The women's 60 metres hurdles event at the 1989 IAAF World Indoor Championships was held at the Budapest Sportcsarnok in Budapest on 5 March.

== Medalists ==
Gold	Silver	Bronze
Yelizaveta Chernyshova; Soviet Union	Ludmila Narozhilenko; Soviet Union	Cornelia Oschkenat; East Germany

== Results ==
=== Heats ===
First 2 of each heat (Q) and next 2 fastest (q) qualified for the final.

Rank	Heat	Name	Nationality	Time	Notes
1	1	Ludmila Narozhilenko	Soviet Union	7.87	Q
2	2	Cornelia Oschkenat	East Germany	7.89	Q
3	1	Marjan Olyslager	Netherlands	7.89	Q, NR
4	2	Kim McKenzie	United States	7.92	Q, PB
5	1	Mihaela Pogăcean	Romania	7.97	q
6	2	Yelizaveta Chernyshova	Soviet Union	8.04	q
7	2	Aliuska López	Cuba	8.08	NR
8	2	Monique Éwanjé-Épée	France	8.08	
9	1	Candy Young	United States	8.10	PB
10	1	Sylvia Dethier	Belgium	8.29	
11	2	Diana Yankey	Ghana	8.61	NR
	1	Gabriele Lippe	West Germany	DNF	

=== Final ===
Rank	Name	Nationality	Time	Notes
1st place, gold medalist(s)	Yelizaveta Chernyshova	Soviet Union	7.82	=CR
2nd place, silver medalist(s)	Ludmila Narozhilenko	Soviet Union	7.83	
3rd place, bronze medalist(s)	Cornelia Oschkenat	East Germany	7.86	
4	Kim McKenzie	United States	7.92	=PB
5	Mihaela Pogăcean	Romania	7.95	
6	Marjan Olyslager	Netherlands	7.95	
