= 1985 European Athletics Indoor Championships – Women's 60 metres hurdles =

The women's 60 metres hurdles event at the 1985 European Athletics Indoor Championships was held on 2 and 3 March.

== Medalists ==
Gold	Silver	Bronze
Cornelia Oschkenat; East Germany	Ginka Zagorcheva; Bulgaria	Anne Piquereau; France

== Results ==
=== Heats ===
First 2 from each heat (Q) and the next 6 fastest (q) qualified for the semifinals.

Rank	Heat	Name	Nationality	Time	Notes
1	1	Cornelia Oschkenat	East Germany	7.99	Q
2	2	Ginka Zagorcheva	Bulgaria	8.08	Q
3	2	Laurence Elloy	France	8.11	Q
4	3	Anne Piquereau	France	8.14	Q
5	1	Marie-Noëlle Savigny	France	8.16	Q
6	2	Ulrike Denk	West Germany	8.20	q
7	3	Nadezhda Korshunova	Soviet Union	8.21	Q
8	3	Sabine Braun	West Germany	8.28	q
9	1	Edith Oker	West Germany	8.29	q
9	3	Margit Palombi	Hungary	8.29	q
9	3	Jitka Tesárková	Czechoslovakia	8.29	q
12	3	Margita Papić	Yugoslavia	8.49	q
13	2	Ann-Louise Skoglund	Sweden	8.50	
14	2	Hilde Fredriksen	Norway	8.59	
	1	Elizabet Pantazis	Greece	DNS	

=== Semifinals ===
First 3 from each semifinal qualified directly (Q) for the final.

Rank	Heat	Name	Nationality	Time	Notes
1	1	Cornelia Oschkenat	East Germany	7.94	Q
2	2	Laurence Elloy	France	7.98	Q
3	2	Nadezhda Korshunova	Soviet Union	8.02	Q
4	1	Anne Piquereau	France	8.04	Q
4	2	Ginka Zagorcheva	Bulgaria	8.04	Q
6	2	Marie-Noëlle Savigny	France	8.08	
7	2	Edith Oker	West Germany	8.12	
8	1	Ulrike Denk	West Germany	8.22	Q
9	1	Sabine Braun	West Germany	8.22	
10	1	Margit Palombi	Hungary	8.33	
11	1	Margita Papić	Yugoslavia	8.40	
12	2	Jitka Tesárková	Czechoslovakia	8.66	

=== Final ===
Rank	Lane	Name	Nationality	Time	Notes
1st place, gold medalist(s)	3	Cornelia Oschkenat	East Germany	7.90	
2nd place, silver medalist(s)	5	Ginka Zagorcheva	Bulgaria	8.02	
3rd place, bronze medalist(s)	1	Anne Piquereau	France	8.03	
4	4	Laurence Elloy	France	8.09	
5	6	Ulrike Denk	West Germany	8.09	
6	2	Nadezhda Korshunova	Soviet Union	8.11	
