= Cornelia Oschkenat =

German track and field athlete

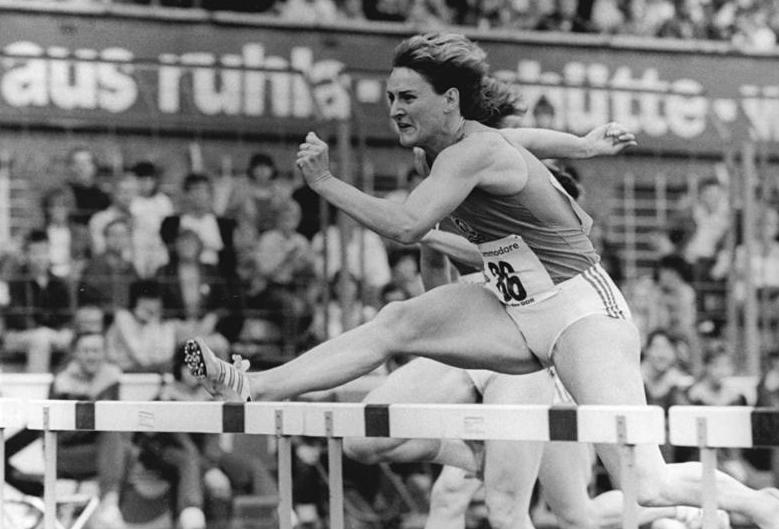
- Oschkenat in 1988

Medal record

Women's athletics

Representing East Germany

World Championships
Silver medal – second place	1987 Rome	4×100 m
Bronze medal – third place	1987 Rome	100 m hurdles

World Indoor Championships
Gold medal – first place	1987 Indianapolis	60 m hurdles
Bronze medal – third place	1989 Budapest	60 m hurdles

European Championships
Silver medal – second place	1986 Stuttgart	100 m hurdles

European Indoor Championships
Gold medal – first place	1985 Piraeus	60 m hurdles
Gold medal – first place	1986 Madrid	60 m hurdles
Gold medal – first place	1988 Budapest	60 m hurdles

IAAF World Cup
Gold medal – first place	1985 Canberra	100 m hurdles
Gold medal – first place	1989 Barcelona	100 m hurdles
Gold medal – first place	1989 Barcelona	4 × 100 m relay

Cornelia Oschkenat, (née Riefstahl; born 29 October 1961) is a German former track and field athlete who represented East Germany. She competed at the 1988 Olympic Games in Seoul. At the 1987 World Championships in Rome, she won a bronze medal in the 100 metres hurdles with a time of 12.46s as well as silver medal as a member of the East German 4 × 100 metres relay team.

She also won the 1987 World Indoor 60 m hurdles title, two World Cup 100 m hurdles titles and three European Indoor 60 m hurdles titles. Her world indoor record for the 50 metres hurdles of 6.58 secs in 1988, still stands (as of 2019).

Oschkenat won eleven East German individual national titles, taking five titles in the 100 m hurdles between 1984 and 1989 at the East German Athletics Championships, as well as six consecutive titles in the 60 m hurdles at the East German Indoor Athletics Championships over that period.

== Career ==
Oschkenat was born Cornelia Riefstahl in Neubrandenburg, Mecklenburg-Vorpommern, East Germany. She began her international career in 1982 and reached the World Championship final in 1983. She was unable to participate in the 1984 Olympic Games in Los Angeles because of her country's boycott of the games. In 1985, she won the World Cup title in Canberra. In 1986 she won a silver medal behind Yordanka Donkova at the European Championships in Stuttgart. She won perhaps her biggest individual title in 1987, at the World Indoor Championships in Indianapolis, when she won the 60 m hurdles, finishing ahead of her two chief career rivals, the Bulgarian pair of Donkova and Ginka Zagorcheva. Later that year at the World Championships in Rome, she won bronze in the 100 m hurdles behind Zagorcheva and East German teammate Gloria Siebert, but ahead of Donkova, who was fourth.

A medal favourite for the 1988 Seoul Olympics, she pulled a muscle midway through the final and limped over the line in eight place. After finishing third at the 1989 World Indoor Championships, she went on to have one of her best ever outdoor seasons. Her victories included both the European and World cup events. She ended the outdoor season unbeaten. Having been ranked second in the Track and Field News world merit rankings for three consecutive years, 1985–87, she was the clear number one in 1989. In 1990, she finished fourth at the European Championships in Split in what would be her eighth consecutive (and final) year ranked in the world top ten (on time and merit). She represented a united Germany at the 1991 World Championships in Tokyo but was eliminated in the heats and retired at the end of that season.

Oschkenat represented the Dynamo Berlin sport club. During her career she was 1.76 meters tall and weighed 65 kilograms. She married fellow hurdler, Andreas Oschkenat in 1984.

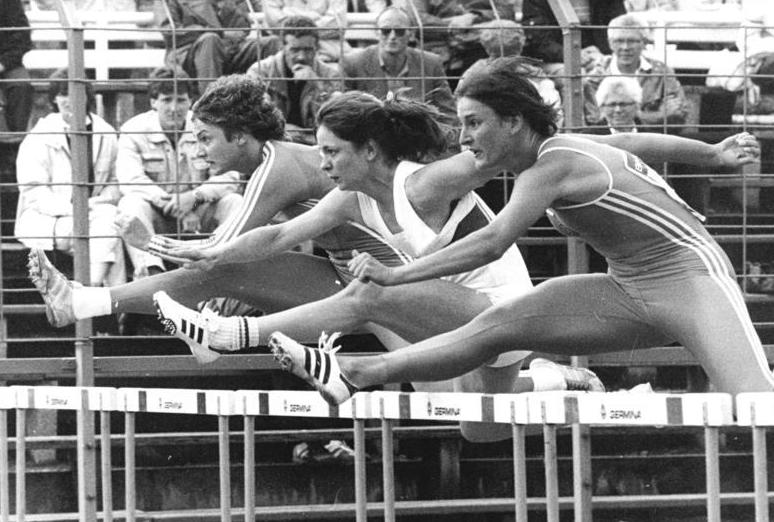
Cornelia Oschkenat (nearest camera), Heike Theele and Kerstin Knabe in Jena (1986)

== International competitions ==
Year	Competition	Venue	Position	Event	Notes
Representing East Germany
1982	European Championships	Athens, Greece	10th (h)	100 m hurdles	13.07
1983	World Championships	Helsinki, Finland	7th	100 m hurdles	12.95
1985	European Indoor Championships	Piraeus, Greece	1st	60 m hurdles	7.90
1985	World Cup	Canberra, Australia	1st	100 m hurdles	12.72
1986	European Indoor Championships	Madrid, Spain	1st	60 m hurdles	7.79
1986	Goodwill Games	Moscow, Soviet Union	2nd	100 m hurdles	12.62
1986	European Championships	Stuttgart, Germany	2nd	100 m hurdles	12.55
1986	Grand Prix Final	Rome, Italy	3rd	100 m hurdles	12.71
1987	World Indoor Championships	Indianapolis, United States	1st	60 m hurdles	7.82
1987	World Championships	Rome, Italy	3rd	100 m hurdles	12.46
1987	World Championships	Rome, Italy	2nd	4 × 100 m relay	41.95
1988	European Indoor Championships	Budapest, Hungary	1st	60 m hurdles	7.77
1988	Olympic Games	Seoul, South Korea	8th	100 m hurdles	13.73
1989	World Indoor Championships	Budapest, Hungary	3rd	60 m hurdles	7.86
1989	World Cup	Barcelona, Spain	1st	100 m hurdles	12.60
1989	World Cup	Barcelona, Spain	1st	4 × 100 m relay	42.21
1990	European Championships	Split, Yugoslavia	4th	100 m hurdles	12.94
Representing Germany
1991	World Championships	Tokyo, Japan	28th (h)	100 m hurdles	13.55

(h) Indicates overall position in qualifying heats.

== National titles ==
- East German Athletics Championships
  - 100 m hurdles: 1984, 1985, 1986, 1988, 1989
- East German Indoor Athletics Championships
  - 60 m hurdles: 1984, 1985, 1986, 1987, 1988, 1989

Sporting positions
Preceded by Yordanka Donkova	Women's 100 m Hurdles Best Year Performance; 1989	Succeeded by Nataliya Grygoryeva
