= Laurence Elloy =

French hurdler (born 1959)

Personal information
- Born: 3 December 1959 (age 66) Rouen, France

Sport
- Sport: Track and field
Medal record
Representing France
Mediterranean Games
| Gold medal – first place | 1979 Split | 100 m hurdles |
IAAF World Indoor Games
| Silver medal – second place | 1985 Paris | 60 m hurdles |

Laurence Elloy-Machabey (born 3 December 1959) is a French track and field athlete who competed in the sprint hurdles. She is a former French national record holder with her best of 12.69 seconds for the 100 metres hurdles. She twice represented France at both the Summer Olympics (1980, 1984) and the World Championships in Athletics (1983, 1987) and was a three-time participant at the European Athletics Championships.

Internationally, she won a gold medal at the 1979 Mediterranean Games and a silver medal at the 1985 IAAF World Indoor Games. She was a five-time outdoor national champion in the 100 m hurdles.

== Career ==
Born in Rouen, she was the daughter of Colette Elloy – a 1952 Olympian for France in the 80 metres hurdles. Running for the Stade Dieppe athletic club, she made her international debut as a teenager at the 1977 European Athletics Junior Championships (coming fourth) then ran at the 1978 European Athletics Championships, where she competed in the 100 metres hurdles heats only. She rose on the regional scene with a gold medal win at the 1979 Mediterranean Games, succeeding her compatriot Nadine Fricault to the title. Elloy's first national title at the French Athletics Championships came in 1979 and she went on to win five such 100 m hurdles titles in the period up to 1986.

In her early career she was a frequent representative for France, but did not make major finals. She appeared at the Summer Olympics in 1980 and 1984, as well as the 1982 European Athletics Championships and 1983 World Championships in Athletics. Elloy began to feature more regularly in international finals from 1985 onwards. She placed fourth at the 1985 European Athletics Indoor Championships then took the silver medal in the 60 metres hurdles at the 1985 IAAF World Indoor Games held in Paris, one place ahead of fellow Frenchwoman Anne Piquereau. Outdoors that year she was the B-final winner of the 100 m hurdles at the 1985 European Cup. She improved her best to 12.79 seconds, which ranked her sixth globally in the 100 m hurdles for that year.

In the 1986 season she was fifth at the 1986 European Athletics Indoor Championships and then sixth at the 1986 European Athletics Championships – her highest placing yet at an outdoor European final. A lifetime best run of 12.69 seconds in Moscow was a French record that lasted for nine years. It made her the eighth fastest hurdler that season. She gave her best performance on the global stage the following year with a time of 12.83 seconds in the final at the 1987 World Championships in Athletics.

Elloy's final international appearances came in 1988, when she was fifth at the 1988 European Athletics Indoor Championships. She ranked third on the 1988 IAAF Grand Prix Final tour. It was also the last year that she won a national title, doing so in the 60 m hurdles at the French Indoor Championships.

== International competitions ==
| Year | Competition | Venue | Position | Event | Notes |
|---|---|---|---|---|---|
| 1977 | European Junior Championships | Donetsk, Soviet Union | 4th | 100 m hurdles | 13.85 |
| 1978 | European Championships | Prague, Czechoslovakia | 23rd (h) | 100 m hurdles | 14.07 |
| 1979 | Mediterranean Games | Split, Yugoslavia | 1st | 100 m hurdles | 13.87 |
| 1980 | Olympic Games | Moscow, Soviet Union | 10th (sf) | 100 m hurdles | 13.33 |
| 1981 | European Indoor Championships | Grenoble, France | – | 50 m hurdles | DNF |
| 1981 | Universiade | Bucharest, Romania | 7th | 100 m hurdles | 13.54 |
| 1982 | European Championships | Athens, Greece | 9th (sf) | 100 m hurdles | 13.07 |
| 1983 | World Championships | Helsinki, Finland | 9th (sf) | 100 m hurdles | 13.08 |
| 1984 | Olympic Games | Los Angeles, United States | 20th (h) | 100 m hurdles | 13.98 |
| 1985 | World Indoor Games | Paris, France | 2nd | 60 m hurdles | 8.08 |
| 1985 | European Indoor Championships | Piraeus, Greece | 4th | 60 m hurdles | 8.09 |
| 1985 | European Cup B-final | Budapest, Hungary | 1st | 100 m hurdles | 13.15 |
| 1986 | European Indoor Championships | Madrid, Spain | 5th | 60 m hurdles | 7.94 |
| 1986 | Goodwill Games | Moscow, Soviet Union | 4th | 100 m hurdles | 12.75 |
| 1986 | European Championships | Stuttgart, West Germany | 6th | 100 m hurdles | 12.93 |
| 1987 | World Championships | Rome, Italy | 6th | 100 m hurdles | 12.83 |
| 1988 | European Indoor Championships | Budapest, Hungary | 5th | 60 m hurdles | 7.95 |
| 1988 | IAAF Grand Prix Final | West Berlin, West Germany | 3rd | 100 m hurdles | 42.5 pts |
(#) Indicates overall position in qualifying heats (h) or semifinals (sf)

== National titles ==
- French Athletics Championships
  - 100 m hurdles: 1979, 1982, 1984, 1985, 1986
- French Indoor Athletics Championships
  - 60 m hurdles: 1984, 1988
