= Women's 100 metres hurdles world record progression =

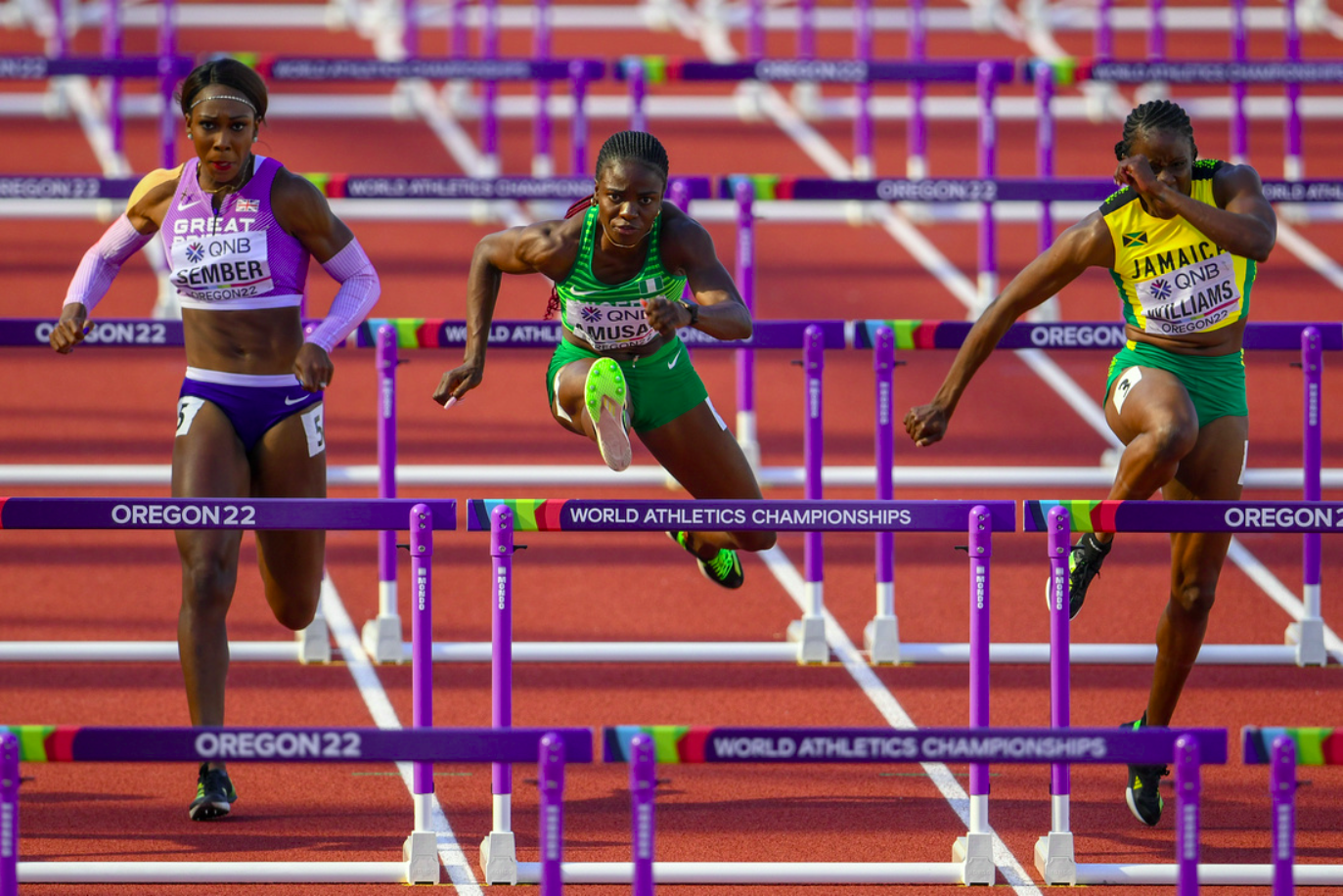
Tobi Amusan (center) during the semi-finals at the 2022 World Athletics Championships where she set her world record of 12.12 s.

The women's 100 metres hurdles is an outdoor track event over a distance of 100 metres with ten hurdles at the height of 83.8 cm (33 inches). The event superseded the women's 80 metres hurdles. The world records of the women's 100 metres hurdles have been recognised by World Athletics (called the International Association of Athletics Federations until 2019) since 1969. Every world record undergoes a ratification process that includes a wind assistance check and doping control.

Initially, 100 metres hurdles races were hand-timed to the tenth of a second. Some races were also fully automatically timed to the hundredth of a second in addition to the hand timing. In 1975–77, World Athletics accepted separate fully automatically timed records for this event, but no new world records were set in that period. From 1977, World Athletics required fully automatic timing for all races of this event, which lead to the recognition of a slower time as the new world record.

Twenty-three world records in this event have been recognised by World Athletics, of which four were equalling the then-current world record. Nine records were set by athletes from East Germany, five by athletes from Poland, five by athletes from Bulgaria, and four by athletes from other nations. The first hand-timed world record of 13.3 seconds was set by Karin Balzer of East Germany in 1969. Balzer has set a total of six world records in this event, more than any other athlete. The last hand-timed world record of 12.3 seconds was set by Annelie Ehrhardt of East Germany in 1973. In 1977, the first recognised fully automatically timed world record became the time of 12.59 seconds set by Ehrhardt in 1972. The longest-standing world record of 12.21 seconds was set by Yordanka Donkova of Bulgaria in 1988 and stood for almost 28 years until 2016. A world record of 12.12 seconds was set by Tobi Amusan of Nigeria in 2022. The latest record of 12.09 was set by Masai Russell of USA on 27 August 2026 at the Weltklasse Zürich.

== Progression ==
Ratified
Not ratified
Ratified but later rescinded
Pending ratification

=== Hand-timed records ===
World records of the women's 100 metres hurdles in 1969–76
Athlete (Nation)	Time in s	Wind in m/s	Auto in s	Location	Date	Ref.
Karin Balzer (GDR)	13.3 h	+1.0		Warsaw, Poland	20 June 1969	
Teresa Sukniewicz (POL)	13.3 h	+1.3		Warsaw, Poland	20 June 1969	
Karin Balzer (GDR)	13.0 h	+1.6		Leipzig, East Germany	27 July 1969	
Karin Balzer (GDR)	12.9 h	+0.7		East Berlin, East Germany	5 September 1969	
Teresa Sukniewicz (POL)	12.8 h	+1.3		Warsaw, Poland	20 June 1970	
Chi Cheng (TPE)	12.8 h	+1.1	12.93	Munich, West Germany	12 July 1970	
Karin Balzer (GDR)	12.7 h	+0.4		East Berlin, East Germany	26 July 1970	
Teresa Sukniewicz (POL)	12.7 h	+1.6		Warsaw, Poland	20 September 1970	
Karin Balzer (GDR)	12.7 h	+1.5		East Berlin, East Germany	25 July 1971	
Karin Balzer (GDR)	12.6 h	+1.9		East Berlin, East Germany	31 July 1971	
Annelie Ehrhardt (GDR)	12.5 h	+0.7		Potsdam, East Germany	15 June 1972	
Pamela Ryan (AUS)	12.5 h	+0.9	12.93	Warsaw, Poland	28 June 1972	
Annelie Ehrhardt (GDR)	12.3 h	+1.5	12.68	Dresden, East Germany	22 July 1973	

=== Fully automatically timed records ===
World records of the women's 100 metres hurdles since 1977
Athlete (Nation)	Time in s	Wind in m/s	Location	Date	Ref.
Annelie Ehrhardt (GDR)	12.59	+0.6	Munich, West Germany	8 September 1972	
Grażyna Rabsztyn (POL)	12.48	+1.9	Fürth, West Germany	10 June 1978	
Grażyna Rabsztyn (POL)	12.36	+1.9	Warsaw, Poland	13 June 1980	
Yordanka Donkova (BUL)	12.35	+0.1	Cologne, West Germany	17 August 1986	
Yordanka Donkova (BUL)	12.29	-0.4	Cologne, West Germany	17 August 1986	
Yordanka Donkova (BUL)	12.26	+1.5	Ljubljana, Yugoslavia	7 September 1986	
Ginka Zagorcheva (BUL)	12.25	+1.4	Drama, Greece	8 August 1987	
Yordanka Donkova (BUL)	12.21	+0.7	Stara Zagora, Bulgaria	20 August 1988	
Kendra Harrison (USA)	12.20	+0.3	London, United Kingdom	22 July 2016	
Tobi Amusan (NGR)	12.12	+0.9	Eugene, Oregon, United States	24 July 2022	
Masai Russell (USA)	12.09	0.0	Zürich, Switzerland	27 August 2026	
