= 1988 United States Olympic trials (track and field) =

- Dates: July 15–23
- Host city: Indianapolis, Indiana, United States
- Venue: IU Michael A. Carroll Track & Soccer Stadium
- Level: Senior
- Type: Outdoor

The 1988 United States Olympic trials for track and field were held at IU Michael A. Carroll Track & Soccer Stadium in Indianapolis, Indiana. This is the only time this venue has been used for the Olympic trials. With the 2013 installation of Field Turf, it is unlikely to host the event again. Organised by The Athletics Congress (TAC), the nine-day competition lasted from July 15 to 23. The national championships in track and field for the United States was a separate event that year, held a week earlier in Tampa, Florida, the last time the Olympic trials were not also the National Championships. The women's Marathon Olympic trials were held on May 1 in Pittsburgh, Pennsylvania. The men's Marathon trials were in Jersey City, New Jersey on April 24. That same day, the 50K Racewalk trials were held adjacent to the stadium.

The results of the event determined qualification for the United States at the 1988 Summer Olympics held two and a half months later in Seoul, South Korea.

This meet is memorable as the site of Florence Griffith Joyner's world record 10.49 in the 100 metres. The record race, in the quarterfinal round, has been questioned because of the wind reading of 0.0 even though video of the race shows flags extended in the background. About the same time on a parallel runway, the final round of the men's triple jump was being conducted. Willie Banks jumped 18.20 m (59 ft 8 1/2 in) on his last attempt with a +5.2 wind reading, That jump has only been surpassed three times by two individuals. Over the four rounds, Griffith Joyner ran three separate races that are faster than any woman has ever run, except for her own, wind aided 10.54 +3.0 to win the 1988 Olympics.

This meet also had the only race where five men have run under 48 seconds for 400 metres hurdles.

== 1988 U.S. Olympic track and field trials results ==
1988 U.S. Olympic track and field trials results

=== Men ===
Key: ≠ Athlete without "A" standard, not selected.

==== Men track events ====
Event	Gold		Silver		Bronze	
100 meters Wind +5.2	Carl Lewis	9.78w	Dennis Mitchell	9.86w	Calvin Smith	9.87w
200 meters Wind +1.8	Joe DeLoach	19.96	Carl Lewis	20.01	Roy Martin	20.05
400 meters	Butch Reynolds	43.93	Danny Everett	43.98	Steve Lewis	44.37
800 meters	Johnny Gray	1:43.96	Mark Everett	1:44.46	Tracy Baskin	1:44.91
1500 meters	Jeff Atkinson	3.40.94	Steve Scott	3.41.12	Mark Deady	3.41.31
5000 meters	Doug Padilla	13.37.86	Terry Brahm	13.40.08	Sydney Maree	13.44.71
10,000 meters	Bruce Bickford	29:07.25	Steve Plasencia	29:08.58	Pat Porter	29:09.02
110 m hurdles Wind +2.5	Roger Kingdom	13.21w	Tonie Campbell	13.25w	Arthur Blake	13.28w
400 m hurdles	Edwin Moses	47.37	Andre Phillips	47.58	Kevin Young	47.72
3000 m s'chase	Brian Abshire	8.23.64	Henry Marsh	8.24.21	Brian Diemer	8.24.40
20K racewalk	Gary Morgan	1:34:12	Tim Lewis	1:36:31	Carl Schueler	1:36:36
50K racewalk	Carl Schueler	3:57:48	Marco Evoniuk	4:03:03	Andy Kaestner	4:05:07
Marathon	Mark Conover	2:12:26	Ed Eyestone	2:12:49	Pete Pfitzinger	2:13:09

==== Men field events ====
Event	Gold		Silver		Bronze	
High jump	Jim Howard	2.34 m (7 ft 8 in)	Hollis Conway	2.32 m (7 ft 7 1/4 in)	Brian Stanton	2.32 m (7 ft 7 1/4 in)
Pole vault	Kory Tarpenning	5.89 m (19 ft 3 3/4 in)	Earl Bell	5.79 m (18 ft 11 3/4 in)	Billy Olson	5.69 m (18 ft 8 in)
Long jump	Carl Lewis	8.76 m (28 ft 8 3/4 in) +0.8	Larry Myricks	8.74 m (28 ft 8 in)w +1.4	Mike Powell	8.36 m (27 ft 5 in)w +2.8
Triple jump	Willie Banks	18.20 m (59 ft 8 1/2 in)w +5.2	Charlie Simpkins	17.93 m (58 ft 9 3/4 in)w +5.2	Robert Cannon	17.63 m (57 ft 10 in)w +4.3
Shot put	Randy Barnes	21.88 m (71 ft 9 1/4 in)	Gregg Tafralis	20.88 m (68 ft 6 in)	Jim Doehring	20.63 m (67 ft 8 in)
Discus throw	Mac Wilkins	66.00 m (216 ft 6 in)	Mike Buncic	65.30 m (214 ft 2 in)	Randy Heisler	64.94 m (213 ft 0 in)
Hammer throw	Ken Flax	77.28 m (253 ft 6 in)	Lance Deal	75.64 m (248 ft 1 in)	Jud Logan	75.10 m (246 ft 4 in)
Javelin throw	Dave Stephens	79.66 m (261 ft 4 in)	Brian Crouser	79.46 m (260 ft 8 in)	Tom Petranoff	79.46 m (260 ft 8 in)
Decathlon	Gary Kinder	8293 (10.82/7.20/16.34/2.02/49.74/14.95/47.72/5.00/66.32/4:55.39)	Tim Bright	8287 (10.95/7.38/13.59/2.05/49.44/14.40/41.62/5.60/60.54/4:45.12)	Dave Johnson	8245 (11.14/7.36/14.63/2.05/49.27/14.84/45.64/4.70/68.22/4:33.92)

=== Women ===
==== Women track events ====
Event	Gold		Silver		Bronze	
100 meters Wind +1.2	Florence Griffith Joyner	10.61	Evelyn Ashford	10.81	Gwen Torrence	10.91

Semi Final 1 (Wind +1.6 mps)

Rank	Name	Time	Notes
1	Florence Griffith Joyner	10.70	
2	Evelyn Ashford	10.85	

Semi Final 2 (Wind +1.3 mps)

Rank	Name	Time	Notes
1	Sheila Echols	10.99	
2	Gwen Torrence	11.00	

Quarter Final 1 (Wind +0.0 mps)

Rank	Name	Time	Notes
1	Florence Griffith Joyner	10.49	WR
2	Diane Williams	10.88	
3	Gail Devers	10.98	

Quarter Final 2 (Wind +0.0 mps)

Rank	Name	Time	Notes
1	Sheila Echols	10.83	
2	Alice Brown	10.92	

Quarter Final 3 (Wind +5.0 mps)

Rank	Name	Time	Notes
1	Gwen Torrence	10.78w	
2	Evelyn Ashford	10.91w	

Heat 1 (Wind +3.2 mps)

Rank	Name	Time	Notes
1	Florence Griffith Joyner	10.60w	
2	Danette Young	11.16w	

Heat 2 (Wind +3.9 mps)

Rank	Name	Time	Notes
1	Sheila Echols	10.83w	
2	Alice Brown	10.88w	
3	Jeanette Bolden	11.10w	
4	Angela Burnham	11.26w	(Rio Mesa High School)

Heat 3 (Wind +2.7 mps)

Rank	Name	Time	Notes
1	Gwen Torrence	10.93w	
2	Diane Williams	11.07w	
3	Jennifer Inniss	11.08w	
4	Carlette Guidry	11.24w	

Heat 4 (Wind +3.5 mps)

Rank	Name	Time	Notes
1	Evelyn Ashford	11.01	
2	Gail Devers	11.16	

Event	Gold		Silver		Bronze	
200 meters Wind +1.3	Florence Griffith Joyner	21.85	Pam Marshall	21.93	Gwen Torrence	22.02

Quarter Final 1 (Wind -0.1 mps)

Rank	Name	Time	Notes
1	Florence Griffith Joyner	21.77	AR

Event	Gold		Silver		Bronze	
400 meters	Diane Dixon	50.38	Denean Howard	50.40	Valerie Brisco	50.53
800 meters	Kim Gallagher	1:58.01	Delisa Walton-Floyd	1:59.20	Joetta Clark	1:59.93
1500 meters	Mary Slaney	3:58.92	Regina Jacobs	4:00.46	Kim Gallagher	4:05.41
3000 meters	Mary Slaney	8:42.53	Vicki Huber	8:46.48	PattiSue Plumer	8:49.21
10,000 meters	Lynn Nelson	31:51.27	Francie Larrieu-Smith	32:03.63	Lynn Jennings	32:07.74
100 m hurdles Wind +0.1	Jackie Humphrey	12.88	Gail Devers	12.90	LaVonna Martin	12.93
400 m hurdles	Schowonda Williams	54.93	Leslie Maxie	55.29	LaTanya Sheffield	55.70
Marathon	Margaret Groos	2:29:50	Nancy Ditz	2:30:14	Cathy O'Brien	2:30:16

==== Women field events ====
Event	Gold		Silver		Bronze	
High jump	Louise Ritter	1.99 m (6 ft 6 1/4 in)	Trish King	1.96 m (6 ft 5 in)	Coleen Sommer	1.96 m (6 ft 5 in)
Long jump	Jackie Joyner Kersee	7.45 m (24 ft 5 1/4 in)w +2.6	Sheila Echols	6.88 m (22 ft 6 3/4 in) (2nd best 6.88w) +2.0	Carol Lewis	6.88 m (22 ft 6 3/4 in) (2nd best 6.85w) +1.6
Triple jump	Niambi Dennis	13.63 m (44 ft 8 1/2 in)	Shonda Swift	13.61 m (44 ft 7 3/4 in)	Cynthea Rhodes	13.54 m (44 ft 5 in)
Shot put	Ramona Pagel	19.33 m (63 ft 5 in)	Bonnie Dasse	18.83 m (61 ft 9 1/4 in)	Connie Price	18.14 m (59 ft 6 in)
Discus throw	Connie Price	61.28 m (201 ft 0 in) (2nd best 59.21)	Ramona Pagel	61.28 m (201 ft 0 in) (2nd best 57.18)	Carol Cady	60.66 m (199 ft 0 in)
Javelin throw	Donna Mayhew	63.66 m (208 ft 10 in)	Karin Smith	56.46 m (185 ft 2 in)	Lynda Sutfin	56.08 m (183 ft 11 in)
Heptathlon	Jackie Joyner	7215 WR (12.71/1.93/15.65/22.30/7.00/50.08/2:20.70)	Cindy Greiner	6266 (13.63/1.87/13.51/24.69/6.36/40.40/2:20.63)	Wendy Brown	6079 (13.77/1.81/12.86/24.76/6.36/45.88/2:28.80)
