= Jacqueline Humphrey =

American hurdler (born 1965)

Personal information
- Nationality: American
- Born: September 30, 1965 (age 60)

Sport
- Sport: Track and field
- Event: 100 metres hurdles

Jacqueline Humphrey-Corbin (née Humphrey, formerly Tompkins; born September 30, 1965) is an American former hurdler. She won the 100 metres hurdles title at the 1988 US Olympic Trials and went on to compete in the women's 100 metres hurdles at the 1988 Seoul Olympics, where she reached the semifinals.

== Career ==
Humphrey competed for the Eastern Kentucky Colonels track and field team in the NCAA.

Humphrey ran her lifetime best 100m hurdles time of 12.83 secs to win the second semifinal at the 1988 US Olympic Trials, before going on to win the final later the same day in 12.88, to defeat Gail Devers (12.90) and LaVonna Martin (192.93) and earn Olympic selection. At the Seoul Olympics, she ran 13.24 in the first round and 13.25 in the second round (quarterfinals) to reach the semifinals, where she was eliminated running 13.59. At both the 1992 and 1996 Olympic trials, she missed out on the semifinals by just one place.

== Competition record ==
Year	Competition	Venue	Position	Notes
Major Championships (Representing United States)
1988	Olympic Games	Seoul, South Korea	15th (sf)	13.59
National Championships
1987	US Championships	San Jose, United States	7th	13.28
1988	US Olympic Trials	Indianapolis, United States	1st	12.88
1989	US Championships	Houston, United States	6th	13.21
1990	US Championships	Norwalk, United States	4th	13.32
1991	US Championships	New York City, United States	8th	13.32
1991	AAA Championships	Birmingham, United Kingdom	4th	13.20
1992	US Olympic Trials/US Championships	New Orleans, United States	17th (qf)	13.51
1996	US Olympic Trials/US Championships	Atlanta, United States	17th (qf)	13.28
(#) Indicates overall position in quarterfinal (qf) or semifinal (sf) round
