= Du Juan (athlete) =

Chinese hurdler

Personal information
- Nationality: Chinese
- Born: 18 March 1968 (age 58)

Sport
- Sport: Track and field
- Event: 100 metres hurdles

Du Juan (杜 娟, born 18 March 1968) is a Chinese hurdler. She competed in the women's 100 metres hurdles at the 1988 Summer Olympics.
