= 60 metres hurdles =

Track and field hurdles foot race

Athletics 60 metres hurdles
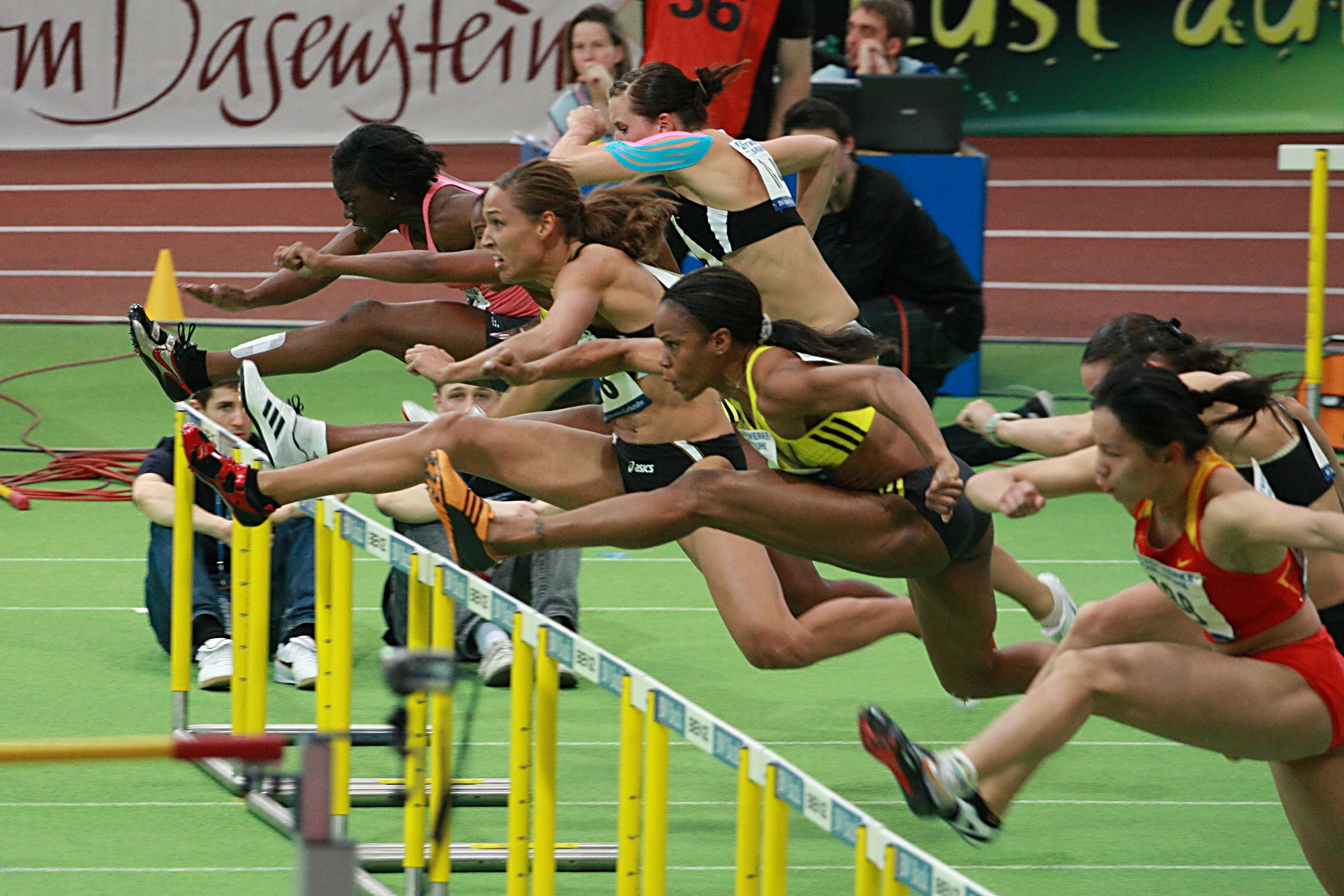
- Athletes running the 60m hurdles at the BW Bank Meeting in Karlsruhe, 2010

World records
- Men: (United States) Grant Holloway 7.27 A (2024)
- Women: (The Bahamas) Devynne Charlton 7.65 (2024, 2026)

World Indoor Championship records
- Men: (United States) Grant Holloway 7.29 (2022, 2024)
- Women: (The Bahamas) Devynne Charlton 7.65 (2024, 2026)

60 metres hurdles is a distance in hurdling which is generally run in indoor competitions. It is equivalent with the first 5 hurdles of a standard outdoor hurdle race. The current women's and men's world records are 7.65 seconds (Devynne Charlton) and 7.27 seconds (Grant Holloway), respectively.

== Area records ==
- Indoor results only.
- Updated 2 August 2026.

Area	Men			Women		
Area	Time (s)	Season	Athlete	Time (s)	Season	Athlete
World	7.27 A	2024	Grant Holloway (USA)	7.65	2024	Devynne Charlton (BAH)
World	7.27 A	2024	Grant Holloway (USA)	7.65	2026	Devynne Charlton (BAH)
Area records
Africa (records)	7.50	2026	Franco le Roux (RSA)	7.75	2024	Tobi Amusan (NGR)
Asia (records)	7.41	2012	Liu Xiang (CHN)	7.82	1999	Olga Shishigina (KAZ)
Europe (records)	7.30	1994	Colin Jackson (GBR)	7.67	2025	Ditaji Kambundji (SUI)
North, Central America and Caribbean (records)	7.27 A	2024	Grant Holloway (USA)	7.65	2024	Devynne Charlton (BAH)
North, Central America and Caribbean (records)	7.27 A	2024	Grant Holloway (USA)	7.65	2026	Devynne Charlton (BAH)
Oceania (records)	7.56	2022	Chris Douglas (AUS)	7.73	2012	Sally Pearson (AUS)
South America (records)	7.57	2026	Marcos Herrera (ECU)	7.91	2014	Yvette Lewis (PAN)

== All-time top 25 ==
Indoor results only

Tables show data for two definitions of "Top 25" - the top 25 60m hurdles times and the top 25 athletes:
- denotes top performance for athletes in the top 25 60m hurdles times
- denotes lesser performances, still in the top 25 60m hurdles times, by repeat athletes
- denotes top performance (only) for other top 25 athletes who fall outside the top 25 60m hurdles times

=== Men ===
- Updated March 2026.

Ath.#	Perf.#	Time (s)	Athlete	Nation	Date	Place	Ref.
1	1	7.27 A	Grant Holloway	United States	16 February 2024	Albuquerque	
	2	7.29	Holloway #2		24 February 2021	Madrid	
	2	7.29	Holloway #3		20 March 2022	Belgrade	
	2	7.29	Holloway #4		2 March 2024	Glasgow	
2	5	7.30	Colin Jackson	Great Britain	6 March 1994	Sindelfingen	
	6	7.32	Holloway #5		9 February 2021	Liévin	
	6	7.32	Holloway #6		24 February 2021	Madrid	
	6	7.32	Holloway #7		10 February 2024	Liévin	
	6	7.32	Holloway #8		2 March 2024	Glasgow	
3	6	7.32	Ja'Kobe Tharp	United States	14 March 2026	Fayetteville	
4	11	7.33	Dayron Robles	Cuba	8 February 2008	Düsseldorf	
	12	7.34	Robles #2		14 March 2010	Doha	
	13	7.35	Holloway #9		9 March 2019	Birmingham	
	13	7.35	Holloway #10		24 January 2021	Fayetteville	
	13	7.35	Holloway #11		17 February 2022	Liévin	
	13	7.35	Holloway #12		25 February 2023	Birmingham	
	13	7.35	Holloway #13		4 February 2024	Boston	
5	13	7.35	Trey Cunningham	United States	21 March 2026	Toruń	
6	19	7.36	Greg Foster	United States	16 January 1987	Los Angeles	
	19	7.36	Jackson #2		12 February 1994	Glasgow	
6	19	7.36	Allen Johnson	United States	6 March 2004	Budapest	
	19	7.36	Robles #3		2 February 2008	Stuttgart	
6	19	7.36	Terrence Trammell	United States	14 March 2010	Doha	
	19	7.36	Holloway #14		13 February 2025	Liévin	
	19	7.36	Holloway #15		22 February 2025	New York City	
	19	7.36	Tharp #2		13 March 2026	Fayetteville	
9		7.37	Roger Kingdom	United States	8 March 1989	Piraeus	
9		7.37	Anier García	Cuba	9 February 2000	Piraeus	
9		7.37	Tony Dees	United States	18 February 2000	Chemnitz	
9		7.37	David Oliver	United States	5 February 2011	Stuttgart	
9		7.37	Dylan Beard	United States	28 February 2026	New York City	
9		7.37	Jakub Szymański	Poland	6 March 2026	Berlin	
15		7.38	Mark Crear	United States	8 March 1998	Sindelfingen	
15		7.38	Reggie Torian	United States	27 February 1999	Atlanta	
17		7.39	Daniel Roberts	United States	22 February 2023	Madrid	
18		7.40 A	Dexter Faulk	United States	25 February 2012	Albuquerque	
18		7.40	Yoel Hernández	Cuba	16 February 2000	Madrid	
20		7.41	Mark McKoy	Canada	14 March 1993	Toronto	
20		7.41	Courtney Hawkins	United States	12 March 1995	Barcelona	
20		7.41	Falk Balzer	Germany	29 January 1999	Chemnitz	
20		7.41	Liu Xiang	China	18 February 2012	Birmingham	
20		7.41	Dimitri Bascou	France	13 February 2016	Berlin	
20		7.41	Omar McLeod	Jamaica	20 March 2016	Portland	
20		7.41	Jason Joseph	Switzerland	5 March 2023	Istanbul	

=== Women ===
- Updated March 2026.

Ath.#	Perf.#	Time (s)	Athlete	Nation	Date	Place	Ref.
1	1	7.65	Devynne Charlton	Bahamas	3 March 2024	Glasgow	
	1	7.65	Charlton #2		22 March 2026	Toruń	
	3	7.67	Charlton #3		11 February 2024	New York City	
2	3	7.67 A	Tia Jones	United States	16 February 2024	Albuquerque	
2	3	7.67	Ditaji Kambundji	Switzerland	7 March 2025	Apeldoorn	
4	6	7.68	Susanna Kallur	Sweden	10 February 2008	Karlsruhe	
	6	7.68 A	T. Jones #2		16 February 2024	Albuquerque	
	6	7.68	Charlton #4		23 February 2024	Madrid	
5	9	7.69	Ludmila Narozhilenko	Soviet Union	4 February 1990	Chelyabinsk	
	10	7.70	Narozhilenko #2		11 February 1993	Madrid	
6	10	7.70 A	Sharika Nelvis	United States	18 February 2018	Albuquerque	
6	10	7.70	Kendra Harrison	United States	3 March 2018	Birmingham	
	13	7.71	Narozhilenko #3		4 February 1990	Chelyabinsk	
	14	7.72	Kallur #2		2 February 2008	Stuttgart	
8	14	7.72	Lolo Jones	United States	13 March 2010	Doha	
	14	7.72	Harrison #2		9 February 2018	Clemson	
	14	7.72 A	Harrison #3		18 February 2018	Albuquerque	
8	14	7.72 A	Ackera Nugent	Jamaica	10 March 2023	Albuquerque	
	14	7.72	T. Jones #3		4 February 2024	Boston	
	14	7.72	Charlton #5		3 March 2024	Glasgow	
8	14	7.72	Nadine Visser	Netherlands	7 March 2025	Apeldoorn	
8	14	7.72	Grace Stark	United States	23 March 2025	Nanjing	
	14	7.72	Charlton #6		23 March 2025	Nanjing	
12	24	7.73	Cornelia Oschkenat	East Germany	25 February 1989	Vienna	
12	24	7.73	Sally Pearson	Australia	10 March 2012	Istanbul	
12	24	7.73 A	Christina Manning	United States	18 February 2018	Albuquerque	
	24	7.73 A	Nugent #2		11 March 2023	Albuquerque	
12	24	7.73	Cyréna Samba-Mayela	France	3 March 2024	Glasgow	
	24	7.73	Stark #2		23 March 2025	Nanjing	
	24	7.73	Kambundji #2		23 March 2025	Nanjing	
12	24	7.73	Pia Skrzyszowska	Poland	22 March 2026	Toruń	
	24	7.73	Visser #2		22 March 2026	Toruń	
17		7.74	Yordanka Donkova	Bulgaria	14 February 1987	Sofia	
17		7.74	Michelle Freeman	Jamaica	3 February 1998	Madrid	
17		7.74	Gail Devers	United States	1 March 2003	Boston	
17		7.74	Masai Russell	United States	22 February 2025	New York City	
21		7.75	Bettine Jahn	East Germany	5 March 1983	Budapest	
21		7.75	Perdita Felicien	Canada	7 March 2004	Budapest	
21		7.75	Danielle Williams	Jamaica	11 February 2022	Clemson	
21		7.75	Tobi Amusan	Nigeria	4 February 2024	Boston	
25		7.76	Gloria Siebert	East Germany	5 February 1988	Sindelfingen	
25		7.76	Brianna Rollins	United States	12 March 2016	Portland	
25		7.76	Laëticia Bapté	France	22 February 2025	Miramas	

== World Indoor Championships medalists ==
=== Men ===
Games	Gold	Silver	Bronze
1985 Paris^{[A]}	Stéphane Caristan (FRA)	Javier Moracho (ESP)	Jon Ridgeon (GBR)
1987 Indianapolis	Tonie Campbell (USA)	Stéphane Caristan (FRA)	Nigel Walker (GBR)
1989 Budapest	Roger Kingdom (USA)	Colin Jackson (GBR)	Igors Kazanovs (URS)
1991 Seville	Greg Foster (USA)	Igors Kazanovs (URS)	Mark McKoy (CAN)
1993 Toronto	Mark McKoy (CAN)	Colin Jackson (GBR)	Tony Dees (USA)
1995 Barcelona	Allen Johnson (USA)	Courtney Hawkins (USA)	Tony Jarrett (GBR)
1997 Paris	Anier García (CUB)	Colin Jackson (GBR)	Tony Dees (USA)
1999 Maebashi	Colin Jackson (GBR)	Reggie Torian (USA)	Falk Balzer (GER)
2001 Lisbon	Terrence Trammell (USA)	Anier García (CUB)	Shaun Bownes (RSA)
2003 Birmingham	Allen Johnson (USA)	Anier García (CUB)	Liu Xiang (CHN)
2004 Budapest	Allen Johnson (USA)	Liu Xiang (CHN)	Maurice Wignall (JAM)
2006 Moscow	Terrence Trammell (USA)	Dayron Robles (CUB)	Dominique Arnold (USA)
2008 Valencia	Liu Xiang (CHN)	Allen Johnson (USA)	Evgeniy Borisov (RUS) Staņislavs Olijars (LAT)
2010 Doha	Dayron Robles (CUB)	Terrence Trammell (USA)	David Oliver (USA)
2012 Istanbul	Aries Merritt (USA)	Liu Xiang (CHN)	Pascal Martinot-Lagarde (FRA)
2014 Sopot	Omo Osaghae (USA)	Pascal Martinot-Lagarde (FRA)	Garfield Darien (FRA)
2016 Portland	Omar McLeod (JAM)	Pascal Martinot-Lagarde (FRA)	Dimitri Bascou (FRA)
2018 Birmingham	Andrew Pozzi (GBR)	Jarret Eaton (USA)	Aurel Manga (FRA)
2022 Belgrade	Grant Holloway (USA)	Pascal Martinot-Lagarde (FRA)	Jarret Eaton (USA)
2024 Glasgow	Grant Holloway (USA)	Lorenzo Simonelli (ITA)	Just Kwaou-Mathey (FRA)
2025 Nanjing	Grant Holloway (USA)	Wilhem Belocian (FRA)	Liu Junxi (CHN)
2026 Toruń	Jakub Szymański (POL)	Enrique Llopis (ESP)	Trey Cunningham (USA)

=== Medal table ===
Rank	Nation	Gold	Silver	Bronze	Total
1	United States (USA)	13	5	6	24
2	Great Britain (GBR)	2	3	3	8
3	Cuba (CUB)	2	3	0	5
4	France (FRA)	1	5	5	11
5	China (CHN)	1	2	3	6
6	Canada (CAN)	1	0	1	2
6	Jamaica (JAM)	1	0	1	2
8	Poland (POL)	1	0	0	1
9	Spain (ESP)	0	2	0	2
10	Soviet Union (URS)	0	1	1	2
11	Italy (ITA)	0	1	0	1
12	Germany (GER)	0	0	1	1
12	Latvia (LAT)	0	0	1	1
12	Russia (RUS)	0	0	1	1
12	South Africa (RSA)	0	0	1	1
Totals (15 entries)		22	22	24	68

=== Women ===
Games	Gold	Silver	Bronze
1985 Paris^{[A]}	Xénia Siska (HUN)	Laurence Elloy (FRA)	Anne Piquereau (FRA)
1987 Indianapolis	Cornelia Oschkenat (GDR)	Yordanka Donkova (BUL)	Ginka Zagorcheva (BUL)
1989 Budapest	Yelizaveta Chernyshova (URS)	Ludmila Narozhilenko (URS)	Cornelia Oschkenat (GDR)
1991 Seville	Ludmila Narozhilenko (URS)	Monique Ewanje (FRA)	Aliuska López (CUB)
1993 Toronto	Julie Baumann (SUI)	LaVonna Martin (USA)	Patricia Girard-Léno (FRA)
1995 Barcelona	Aliuska López (CUB)	Olga Shishigina (KAZ)	Brigita Bukovec (SLO)
1997 Paris	Michelle Freeman (JAM)	Gillian Russell (JAM)	Cheryl Dickey (USA)
1999 Maebashi	Olga Shishigina (KAZ)	Glory Alozie (NGR)	Keturah Anderson (CAN)
2001 Lisbon	Anjanette Kirkland (USA)	Michelle Freeman (JAM)	Nicole Ramalalanirina (FRA)
2003 Birmingham	Gail Devers (USA)	Glory Alozie (ESP)	Melissa Morrison (USA)
2004 Budapest	Perdita Felicien (CAN)	Gail Devers (USA)	Linda Ferga-Khodadin (FRA)
2006 Moscow	Derval O'Rourke (IRL)	Glory Alozie (ESP)	Susanna Kallur (SWE)
2008 Valencia	Lolo Jones (USA)	Candice Davis (USA)	Anay Tejeda (RUS)
2010 Doha	Lolo Jones (USA)	Perdita Felicien (CAN)	Priscilla Lopes-Schliep (CAN)
2012 Istanbul	Sally Pearson (AUS)	Tiffany Porter (GBR)	Alina Talay (BLR)
2014 Sopot	Nia Ali (USA)	Sally Pearson (AUS)	Tiffany Porter (GBR)
2016 Portland	Nia Ali (USA)	Brianna Rollins (USA)	Tiffany Porter (GBR)
2018 Birmingham	Kendra Harrison (USA)	Christina Manning (USA)	Nadine Visser (NED)
2022 Belgrade	Cyréna Samba-Mayela (FRA)	Devynne Charlton (BAH)	Gabriele Cunningham (USA)
2024 Glasgow	Devynne Charlton (BAH)	Cyréna Samba-Mayela (FRA)	Pia Skrzyszowska (POL)
2025 Nanjing	Devynne Charlton (BAH)	Ditaji Kambundji (SUI)	Ackera Nugent (JAM)
2026 Toruń	Devynne Charlton (BAH)	Nadine Visser (NED)	Pia Skrzyszowska (POL)

- ^{^{A}} Known as the World Indoor Games

=== Medal table ===
Rank	Nation	Gold	Silver	Bronze	Total
1	United States (USA)	7	5	3	15
2	Bahamas (BAH)	3	1	0	4
3	Soviet Union (URS)	2	1	0	3
4	France (FRA)	1	3	4	8
5	Jamaica (JAM)	1	2	1	4
6	Canada (CAN)	1	1	2	4
7	Australia (AUS)	1	1	0	2
7	Kazakhstan (KAZ)	1	1	0	2
7	Switzerland (SUI)	1	1	0	2
10	Cuba (CUB)	1	0	1	2
10	East Germany (GDR)	1	0	1	2
12	Hungary (HUN)	1	0	0	1
12	Ireland (IRL)	1	0	0	1
14	Spain (ESP)	0	2	0	2
15	Great Britain (GBR)	0	1	2	3
16	Bulgaria (BUL)	0	1	1	2
16	Netherlands (NED)	0	1	1	2
18	Nigeria (NGR)	0	1	0	1
19	Poland (POL)	0	0	2	2
20	Belarus (BLR)	0	0	1	1
20	Russia (RUS)	0	0	1	1
20	Slovenia (SLO)	0	0	1	1
20	Sweden (SWE)	0	0	1	1
Totals (23 entries)		22	22	22	66

== World leading times ==
Indoor results only

=== Men ===
Year	Time	Athlete	Place
1973	7.69	Frank Siebeck (GDR)	Rotterdam
1974	7.66	Anatoliy Moshiashvili (URS)	Gothenburg
1975	7.66	Frank Siebeck (GDR)	Katowice
1976	7.66	Larry Shipp (USA)	Leningrad
1977	7.62	Thomas Munkelt (GDR)	San Sebastián
1978	7.62	Thomas Munkelt (GDR)	Milan
1979	7.59	Thomas Munkelt (GDR)	Vienna
1980	7.54	Yuriy Chervanyev (URS)	Sindelfingen
1981	7.69	Guy Drut (FRA)	Turin
1982	7.61	Andrey Prokofyev (URS)	Moscow
1983	7.48	Thomas Munkelt (GDR)	Budapest
1984	7.58	Tonie Campbell (USA)	Cosford
1985	7.58	Igor Kazanov (URS)	Chişinău
1986	7.47	Mark McKoy (CAN)	Tokyo
1987	7.36	Greg Foster (USA)	Los Angeles
1988	7.47	Mark McKoy (CAN)	Genova
1989	7.37	Roger Kingdom (USA)	Athens
1990	7.43	Colin Jackson (GBR)	Cosford
1991	7.42	Greg Foster (USA)	San Sebastián
1991	7.42	Roger Kingdom (USA)	San Sebastián
1992	7.42	Colin Jackson (GBR)	Glasgow
1993	7.41	Mark McKoy (CAN)	Toronto
1994	7.30	Colin Jackson (GBR)	Sindelfingen
1995	7.38	Allen Johnson (USA)	Karlsruhe
1996	7.46	Courtney Hawkins (USA)	Atlanta
1997	7.46	Colin Jackson (GBR)	Stuttgart
1998	7.38	Mark Crear (USA)	Sindelfingen
1999	7.38	Reggie Torian (USA)	Atlanta
1999	7.38	Colin Jackson (GBR)	Maebashi
2000	7.37	Anier García (CUB)	Athens
2000	7.37	Tony Dees (USA)	Chemnitz
2001	7.47	Terrence Trammell (USA)	New York City
2002	7.40	Colin Jackson (GBR)	Vienna
2003	7.39	Allen Johnson (USA)	Boston
2004	7.36	Allen Johnson (USA)	Budapest
2005	7.42	Ladji Doucouré (FRA)	Liévin
2006	7.43	Terrence Trammell (USA)	Moscow
2007	7.38	Dayron Robles (CUB)	Stuttgart
2008	7.33	Dayron Robles (CUB)	Düsseldorf
2009	7.37	Terrence Trammell (USA)	Boston
2010	7.34	Dayron Robles (CUB)	Doha
2011	7.37	David Oliver (USA)	Stuttgart
2012	7.40 A	Dexter Faulk (USA)	Albuquerque
2013	7.49	Sergey Shubenkov (RUS)	Gothenburg
2014	7.45	Pascal Martinot-Lagarde (FRA)	Mondeville
2014	7.45	Omoghan Osaghae (USA)	Sopot
2015	7.45	Orlando Ortega (CUB)	Łódź
2015	7.45	Omar McLeod (JAM)	Fayetteville
2016	7.41	Dimitri Bascou (FRA)	Berlin
2016	7.41	Omar McLeod (JAM)	Portland
2017	7.43	Andy Pozzi (GBR)	Birmingham
2018	7.42	Grant Holloway (USA)	Clemson
2019	7.35	Grant Holloway (USA)	Birmingham
2020	7.38	Grant Holloway (USA)	Clemson
2021	7.29	Grant Holloway (USA)	Madrid
2022	7.29	Grant Holloway (USA)	Belgrade
2023	7.35	Grant Holloway (USA)	Birmingham
2024	7.27 A	Grant Holloway (USA)	Albuquerque
2025	7.36	Grant Holloway (USA)	Liévin
2025	7.36	Grant Holloway (USA)	New York City
2026	7.32	Ja'Kobe Tharp (USA)	Fayetteville

=== Women ===
Year	Time	Athlete	Place
1973	8.02	Anneliese Ehrhardt (GDR)	Rotterdam
1974	7.90	Anneliese Ehrhardt (GDR)	Gothenburg
1975	8.04	Grażyna Rabsztyn (POL)	Katowice
1976	7.96	Grażyna Rabsztyn (POL)	Munich
1977	8.31	Zofia Bielczyk (POL)	San Sebastián
1978	7.94	Johanna Klier (GDR)	Milan
1979	7.86	Grażyna Rabsztyn (POL)	Zabrze
1980	7.77	Zofia Bielczyk (POL)	Sindelfingen
1981	8.08	Tatyana Anisimova (URS)	Minsk
1982	7.97	Kerstin Knabe (GDR)	Senftenberg
1983	7.75	Bettine Jahn (GDR)	Budapest
1984	7.90	Lucyna Langer-Kalek (POL)	Warsaw
1984	7.90	Lucyna Langer-Kalek (POL)	Stuttgart
1985	7.90	Cornelia Oschkenat (GDR)	Athens
1986	7.79	Cornelia Oschkenat (GDR)	Madrid
1987	7.74	Yordanka Donkova (BUL)	Sofia
1988	7.76	Gloria Siebert (GDR)	Sindelfingen
1989	7.73	Cornelia Oschkenat (GDR)	Vienna
1990	7.69	Ludmila Narozhilenko (URS)	Chelyabinsk
1991	7.82	Ludmila Narozhilenko (URS)	Liévin
1991	7.82	Monique Éwanjé-Épée (FRA)	Paris
1992	7.76	Ludmila Narozhilenko (RUS)	Madrid
1993	7.70	Ludmila Narozhilenko (RUS)	Madrid
1994	7.83	Yordanka Donkova (BUL)	Liévin
1995	7.84	Patricia Girard (FRA)	Liévin
1996	7.80	Brigita Bukovec (SLO)	Liévin
1997	7.77	Michelle Freeman (JAM)	Liévin
1998	7.74	Michelle Freeman (JAM)	Madrid
1999	7.78	Brigita Bukovec (SLO)	Stuttgart
2000	7.78	Michelle Freeman (JAM)	Liévin
2001	7.83	Michelle Freeman (JAM)	Liévin
2002	7.84 (Note: This performance was at the European Indoor Championships. Alozie represented Spain having recently switched allegiance from Nigeria. She was subsequently disqualified as the required transfer formalities had not been properly completed. This fact does not affect the statistical validity of the performance.)	Glory Alozie (ESP)	Vienna
2003	7.74	Gail Devers (USA)	Boston
2004	7.75	Perdita Felicien (CAN)	Budapest
2005	7.80	Susanna Kallur (SWE)	Madrid
2006	7.83	Lacena Golding-Clarke (JAM)	Leipzig
2007	7.84	Susanna Kallur (SWE)	Birmingham
2008	7.68	Susanna Kallur (SWE)	Karlsruhe
2009	7.82	Lolo Jones (USA)	Karlsruhe
2009	7.82	Lolo Jones (USA)	Birmingham
2010	7.72	Lolo Jones (USA)	Doha
2011	7.79 A	Kellie Wells (USA)	Albuquerque
2012	7.73	Sally Pearson (AUS)	Istanbul
2013	7.78	Brianna Rollins (USA)	Clemson
2014	7.79	Sally Pearson (AUS)	Berlin
2014	7.79	Sally Pearson (AUS)	Sopot
2015	7.83	Sharika Nelvis (USA)	Malmö
2016	7.76	Brianna Rollins (USA)	Portland
2017	7.74 A	Kendra Harrison (USA)	Albuquerque
2018	7.70 A	Sharika Nelvis (USA)	Albuquerque
2018	7.70	Kendra Harrison (USA)	Birmingham
2019	7.85	Sharika Nelvis (USA)	New York
2020	7.80	Kendra Harrison (USA)	Clemson
2021	7.77	Nadine Visser (NED)	Toruń
2022	7.75	Danielle Williams (JAM)	Belgrade
2023	7.72 A	Ackera Nugent (JAM)	Albuquerque
2024	7.65	Devynne Charlton (BAH)	Glasgow
2025	7.67	Ditaji Kambundji (SUI)	Apeldoorn
2026	7.65	Devynne Charlton (BAH)	Toruń
