= Bang Sin-hye =

South Korean hurdler

Personal information
- Nationality: South Korean
- Born: 13 May 1967 (age 59)

Korean name
- Hangul: 방신혜
- Hanja: 方信惠
- RR: Bang Sinhye
- MR: Pang Sinhye

Sport
- Sport: Track and field
- Event: 100 metres hurdles

Bang Sin-hye (Korean: 방신혜; born 13 May 1967) is a South Korean hurdler. She competed in the women's 100 metres hurdles at the 1988 Summer Olympics.

Bang began participating in track as a student at the Gyeongsan Girls' Middle School. (Note: 경산여자중학교; 慶山女子中學校; Gyeongsan Yeoja Junghakgyo) She went on to attend Gyeongsan Girls' High School (Note: 경산여자고등학교; 慶山女子高等學校; Gyeongsan Yeoja Godeunghakgyo) and Kyungpook National University. Her personal best of 13.63 seconds in the women's 100m hurdles, which she set on 7 May 1988 at the 42nd National University Track Championships, (Note: 전국대학육상선수권대회; 全國大學陸上選手權大會; Jeonguk Daehak Yuksang Seonsugwon Daehoe) stood as South Korea's national record for 16 years until it was broken by Lee Yeon-kyung on 24 September 2004. After the Olympics and her university graduation, she represented the city of Daegu in South Korean national competitions. She came in first place in the 110m hurdles with a time of 14.59 seconds at the 72nd National Track Championships (Note: 전국육상경기선수권대회; 全國陸上競技選手權大會; Jeonguk Yuksang Gyeonggi Seonsugwon Daehoe) in June 1990. She later retired from sport and became a teacher at Daegu No. 1 Science High School. (Note: 대구일과학고등학교; 大邱一科學高等學校; Daegu Il Gwahak Godeunghakgyo) She joined the board of directors of the Daegu Sports Council in 2016.
