= Masters W35 100 metres hurdles world record progression =

This is the progression of world record improvements of the 100 metres hurdles W35 division of Masters athletics.

Key

Incomplete information Wind aided Pending

Hand	Auto	Wind	Athlete	Nationality	Birthdate	Location	Date
	12.37	0.7	Nia Ali	United States	23.10.1988	Eugene, OR	30.06.2024
	12.47	0.7	Ludmila Engquist	Sweden	21.04.1964	Sevilla	28.08.1999
	13.04	1.9	Jelizaveta Chernyshova	Russia	26.01.1958	Wipperfürth	19.06.1994
	13.24	0.4	Lyudmila Oliyar	Latvia	05.02.1958	Nurmijarvi	15.07.1993
	13.60		Jane Frederick	United States	07.04.1952	Talence	26.09.1987
	13.95		Judy Vernon	United Kingdom	25.09.1945	Brighton	23.08.1984
