= Cheung Suet Yee =

Hong Kong hurdler

Personal information
- Nationality: Hong Konger
- Born: 29 August 1965 (age 60)

Sport
- Sport: Track and field
- Event: 100 metres hurdles

Cheung Suet Yee (born 29 August 1965) is a Hong Kong hurdler. She competed in the women's 100 metres hurdles at the 1988 Summer Olympics.
