= Wendy Jeal =

English athletics competitor

Wendy Jeal née McDonnell
Personal information
- Nationality: British (English)
- Born: 21 November 1960 (age 65) Epping, Essex, England
- Height: 165 cm (5 ft 5 in)
- Weight: 63 kg (139 lb)

Sport
- Sport: Athletics
- Club: Haringey Athletics Club
Medal record
Athletics
Representing England
Commonwealth Games
Silver medal – second place	1986 Edinburgh	100m hurdles

Wendy Jeal (née McDonnell, born 21 November 1960) is a female English former track and field athlete who competed in the 100 metres hurdles. She represented Great Britain at the 1988 Olympic Games. In 1986, representing England, she won a Commonwealth Games silver medal.

== Biography ==
Jeal was born in Epping, Essex, England and was a member of the Harlow Athletics Club and then the Haringey Athletics Club. As Wendy McDonnell, she won the AAAs National under 15 75 metres hurdles title in 1975 and the AAAs National under 17 80 metres hurdles title in 1977.

As a seventeen-year-old, she won her first senior national championships medal in 1978, with third at the AAAs indoor 60 m hurdles. In 1982, she was second at the UK National Championships in the 100 metres hurdles. In 1985, now competing as Wendy Jeal and after several years on the edge of major championships selection, she competed in the 60 m hurdles at the IAAF World Indoor Games in Paris. She ran 8.34 secs to reach the semi-finals. Also in 1985, Jeal finished second behind Glynis Nunn in the 100 metres hurdles event at the 1985 WAAA Championships.

Jeal had the best year of her career in 1986. She finished third at both the UK National Championships and AAA Championships, behind Sally Gunnell and Lesley-Ann Skeete, and ahead of 1984 Olympic silver medallist Shirley Strong. She earned selection for both the Commonwealth Games and the European Championships. The Commonwealth Games in Edinburgh proved to be the highlight of her career, as she won the silver medal for England in Edinburgh, Scotland, in a time of 13.41, behind Sally Gunnell and ahead of Glynis Nunn and Julie Rocheleau (later Baumann). At the European Championships in Stuttgart, she ran her lifetime best of 13.16 in the heats, to reach the semi-finals.

In 1987, Jeal finished third behind Lesley-Ann Skeete and Kim Hagger at the UK Championships and third at the AAAs Championships behind Sally Gunnell and Skeete, earning selection for the World Championships in Rome, where she was eliminated in the heats, running 13.44. At the 1988 AAAs Championships, incorporating the Olympic trials, Jeal once again finished third behind Sally Gunnell and Lesley-Ann Skeete, earning Olympic selection. At the Seoul Olympics, she reached the quarter-finals, running 13.32.

Throughout her career, Jeal finished second or third at senior national championships fourteen times, without winning. Her last top three result, was finishing third at the 1990 UK Championships.

== Achievements ==
- 3rd at the AAAs National Championships 100 m hurdles (1985, 1986, 1987, 1988)
- 2nd at the UK National Championships 100 m hurdles (1982) 3rd (1984, 1986, 1987, 1990)
- 2nd at the AAAs Indoor Championships 60 m hurdles (1980, 1985, 1986) 3rd (1978, 1987)
- AAAs Under 17 80 hurdles Champion (1977)
- AAAs Under 15 75 m hurdles Champion (1975)

Year	Competition	Venue	Position	Event	Notes
Representing Great Britain / England
1985	World Indoor Games	Paris, France	7th (sf)	60 m hurdles	8.37 (8.34)
1986	Commonwealth Games	Edinburgh, Scotland	2nd	100 m hurdles	13.41 (13.33)
1986	European Championships	Stuttgart, Germany	13th (sf)	100 m hurdles	13.29 (13.16)
1987	World Championships	Rome, Italy	18th (h)	100 m hurdles	13.41
1988	Olympic Games	Seoul, South Korea	17th (qf)	100 m hurdles	13.32
(#) Indicates overall position in heats (h) quarterfinals (qf) or semifinals (sf). Times in parentheses indicate superior time achieved in heats.
