= Yelizaveta Chernyshova =

Medal record

Women's athletics

Representing Soviet Union

World Indoor Championships
Gold medal – first place	1989 Budapest	60 m hurdles

Yelizaveta Chernyshova (Russian: Елизавета Чернышова; born 26 January 1958) is a Russian former Soviet hurdler. She was the 1989 World Indoor Champion. After the fall of the Soviet Union, she continued to compete for Russia. In 1994 she set the W35 Masters world record in the 100 metres hurdles. She held the record for five years until it was surpassed by another former Soviet hurdler Ludmila Engquist, who was also the runner up in the 1989 Indoor Championships.

She was the winner of the 100 metres hurdles at the first Russian Athletics Championships after the break up of the Soviet Union.

== See also ==
- List of masters athletes
- List of IAAF World Indoor Championships medalists (women)
