= Anne Piquereau =

French hurdler

Personal information
- Born: 15 June 1964 (age 62) Poitiers, France
- Height: 172 cm (5 ft 8 in)
- Weight: 65 kg (143 lb)

Sport
- Country: France
- Sport: Athletics
- Event: High hurdles
- Club: Stade Clermont-Ferrand
Medal record
Representing France
World Indoor Championships
Bronze medal – third place	1985 Paris	60m hurdles
European Indoor Championships
Silver medal – second place	1986 Madrid	60m hurdles
Bronze medal – third place	1985 Piraeus	60m hurdles
Bronze medal – third place	1994 Paris	60m hurdles
Summer Universiade
Bronze medal – third place	1985 Kobe	100m hurdles
Mediterranean Games
Gold medal – first place	1991 Athens	100m hurdles

Anne Piquereau (born 15 June 1964 in Poitiers) is a retired French track and field athlete who specialised in the 100 metres hurdles. She won the bronze medal at the 1985 World Indoor Games (later renamed World Indoor Championships) and three medals at European Indoor Championships. In addition, she represented her country at the 1988 and 1992 Summer Olympics, as well as at three outdoor World Championships, most notably finishing fifth in 1987.

She has personal bests of 12.74 seconds in the 100 metres hurdles (Saint-Denis 1991) and 7.88 seconds in the indoor 60 metres hurdles (Bordeaux 1990).

== Competition record ==
Year	Competition	Venue	Position	Event	Notes
Representing France
1981	European Junior Championships	Utrecht, Netherlands	3rd	100 m hurdles	13.76
1983	Universiade	Edmonton, Canada	7th	100 m hurdles	13.49
1984	European Indoor Championships	Gothenburg, Sweden	8th	60 m hurdles	8.76
1985	World Indoor Games	Paris, France	3rd	60 m hurdles	8.10
1985	European Indoor Championships	Piraeus, Greece	3rd	60 m hurdles	8.03
1985	Universiade	Kobe, Japan	3rd	100 m hurdles	12.96
1986	European Indoor Championships	Madrid, Spain	2nd	60 m hurdles	7.89
1986	European Championships	Stuttgart, West Germany	semifinals (dq)	100 m hurdles	12.96
1987	European Indoor Championships	Liévin, France	4th	60 m hurdles	8.05
1987	Universiade	Zagreb, Yugoslavia	5th	100 m hurdles	12.89
1987	World Championships	Rome, Italy	5th	100 m hurdles	12.82
1988	European Indoor Championships	Budapest, Hungary	heats	60 m hurdles	8.36
1988	Olympic Games	Seoul, South Korea	quarterfinals (dnf)	100 m hurdles	13.56 (heat)
1989	Jeux de la Francophonie	Rabat, Morocco	2nd	100 m hurdles	12.99
1990	European Indoor Championships	Glasgow, United Kingdom	4th	60 m hurdles	8.02
1990	European Championships	Split, Yugoslavia	semifinals	100 m hurdles	13.08
1991	World Indoor Championships	Seville, Spain	5th	60 m hurdles	8.04
1991	Mediterranean Games	Athens, Greece	1st	100 m hurdles	12.88
1991	World Championships	Tokyo, Japan	semifinals	100 m hurdles	13.02
1992	European Indoor Championships	Genoa, Italy	8th	60 m hurdles	8.35
1992	Olympic Games	Barcelona, Spain	semifinals	100 m hurdles	13.25
1992	World Cup	Havana, Cuba	2nd	100 m hurdles	13.13
1993	World Indoor Championships	Toronto, Canada	heats	60 m hurdles	8.34
1994	European Indoor Championships	Paris, France	3rd	60 m hurdles	7.91
1994	Jeux de la Francophonie	Paris, France	2nd	100 m hurdles	13.18
1994	European Championships	Helsinki, Finland	8th	100 m hurdles	13.25
1995	World Championships	Gothenburg, Sweden	semifinals	100 m hurdles	13.09
1996	European Indoor Championships	Stockholm, Sweden	5th	60 m hurdles	8.25

Notes:
- DQ = disqualified.
- Represented Europe at the 1992 World Cup.

== National Championships ==
- (gold) Champion of France at 100m hurdles in 1988, 1992 and 1994
- (gold) Champion of France Indoors at 60m hurdles in 1985, 1986, 1987 and 1990
