= Chen Wen-xing =

Taiwanese sprinter

Personal information
- Nationality: Taiwanese
- Born: 陳 文英, Pinyin: Chén Wén-yīng; 10 November 1964 (age 60)

Sport
- Sport: Sprinting
- Event: 4 × 100 metres relay

Chen Wen-xing (born 10 November 1964) is a Taiwanese sprinter. She competed in the women's 4 × 100 metres relay at the 1988 Summer Olympics.
