= Ulrike Kleindl =

Austrian long jumper

Personal information
- Nationality: Austrian
- Born: 27 May 1963 (age 63) Graz, Austria

Sport
- Sport: Athletics
- Event: Long jump

Ulrike Kleindl (born 27 May 1963) is an Austrian athlete. She competed in the women's long jump at the 1988 Summer Olympics.

Her daughter, Katrin Beierl is an Olympic bobsledder.
