= Mihaela Pogăcean =

Romanian hurdler

Personal information
- Born: 27 January 1958 (age 68) Bucharest, Romania

Sport
- Sport: Track and field
Medal record
Representing Romania
European Indoor Championships
Bronze medal – third place	1988 Budapest	60m hurdles
Bronze medal – third place	1990 Glasgow	60m hurdles

Mihaela Pogǎcean (née Stoica, born 27 January 1958) is a Romanian former hurdler. Her best times of 7.86 secs (1988) for the 60 metres hurdles and 12.62 secs (1990) for the 100 metres hurdles, still stand as Romanian records.

== International competitions ==
Year	Competition	Venue	Position	Event	Notes
1982	Balkan Games	Bucharest, Romania	1st	100 m hurdles	13.15
1983	World Championships	Helsinki, Finland	14th (qf)	100 m hurdles	13.21
1986	European Championships	Stuttgart, Germany	8th	100 m hurdles	13.17
1988	European Indoor Championships	Budapest, Hungary	3rd	60 m hurdles	7.92
1988	Balkan Games	Ankara, Turkey	1st	100 m hurdles	12.84
1989	World Indoor Championships	Budapest, Hungary	5th	60 m hurdles	7.95
1989	Balkan Games	Serres, Greece	1st	100 m hurdles	12.91
1990	European Indoor Championships	Glasgow, United Kingdom	3rd	60 m hurdles	7.99
1991	World Indoor Championships	Seville, Spain	6th	60 m hurdles	8.04
1991	World Championships	Tokyo, Japan	20th (h)	100 m hurdles	13.38
(#) Indicates overall position in heats (h) or quarter-finals (qf)
