= Nataliya Grygoryeva (hurdler) =

Ukrainian athletics competitor (born 1962)

Personal information
- Born: 3 December 1962 (age 63) Ishimbay, Soviet Union

Sport
- Sport: Track and field
Medal record
Representing Soviet Union
World Championships
Bronze medal – third place	1991 Tokyo	100 m hurdles

Nataliya Grigoryeva (Ukrainian: Наталія Григорьєва, née Dorofeyeva, born 3 December 1962) is a retired athlete who specialized in the 100 metres hurdles. She represented the Soviet Union and Ukraine, and holds the Ukrainian record.

== Career ==
Grigoryeva was born in Ishimbay in today's Bashkortostan, and represented the club Spartak in Kharkiv. She finished fourth at the 1988 Olympic Games, won the gold medal at the 1990 Goodwill Games, and won the bronze medal at the 1991 World Championships. She was caught for doping around this point in her career.

She also competed at the 1990 European Championships, the 1996 Olympic Games and the 1997 World Indoor Championships without reaching the final.

Her personal best time was 12.39 seconds, achieved in July 1991 in Kiev. This is the current Ukrainian record, even though she achieved it whilst representing the Soviet Union. As of 2015, this time still ranks her in the top 10 on the world all-time list. In the 60 metres hurdles she had a personal best time of 7.85 seconds, achieved in February 1990 in Chelyabinsk.

== Achievements ==
Year	Competition	Venue	Position	Event	Notes
Representing Soviet Union
1986	European Championships	Stuttgart, West Germany	7th	100 m hurdles	12.96
1988	Olympic Games	Seoul, South Korea	4th	100 m hurdles	12.79
1990	Goodwill Games	Seattle, United States	1st	100 m hurdles	12.70
1990	European Championships	Split, Yugoslavia	semi-final	100 m hurdles	12.98
1991	World Championships	Tokyo, Japan	3rd	100 m hurdles	12.69
Representing Ukraine
1996	Olympic Games	Atlanta, United States	quarter-final	100 m hurdles	12.96
