= Gloria Siebert =

East German hurdler (born 1964)

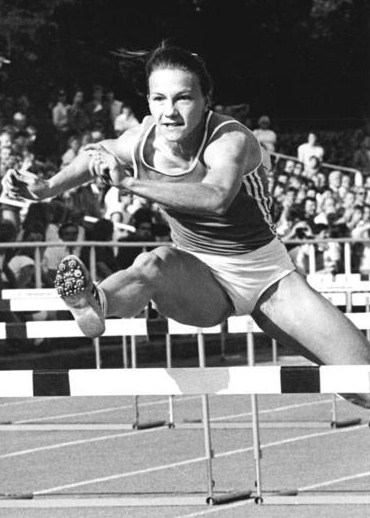
- Gloria Siebert, 1987

Medal record

Women's athletics

Representing East Germany

Olympic Games
Silver medal – second place	1988 Seoul	100 m hurdles

World Championships
Silver medal – second place	1987 Rome	100 m hurdles

European Championships
Silver medal – second place	1990 Split	100 m hurdles

Gloria Siebert (née Kovarik, born 13 January 1964 in Ortrand, Bezirk Cottbus) is a former East German hurdler.

She won the silver medal in the 100 metres hurdles at the 1988 Summer Olympics in Seoul. She also won silver medals at the 1981 European Junior Championships, the 1987 European Indoor Championships, the 1987 World Championships and the 1990 European Championships. Her result at the 1987 World Championships was 12.44 seconds, a career best time. This ranks her second among German 100 m hurdlers, only behind Bettine Jahn.

She competed for the sports club SC Cottbus during her active career, and became East German champion in 1987 and 1990 (100 metres hurdles) and 1984 (400 metres hurdles).

Her son Sebastian Siebert is also a hurdler.

== Achievements ==
Year	Competition	Venue	Position	Event	Notes
Representing East Germany / Germany
1981	European Junior Championships	Utrecht, Netherlands	2nd	100 m hurdles	13.27
1987	European Indoor Championships	Lievin, France	2nd	60 m hurdles	7.89
1987	World Championships	Rome, Italy	2nd	100 m hurdles	12.44
1988	Olympic Games	Seoul, South Korea	2nd	100 m hurdles	12.61
1990	European Championships	Split, Yugoslavia	2nd	100 m hurdles	12.91
1991	World Championships	Tokyo, Japan	heats	100 m hurdles	13.29
