= Nadiya Bodrova =

Ukrainian hurdler (born 1961)

Personal information
- Nationality: Ukrainian
- Born: 13 July 1961 (age 65) Kharkiv, Soviet Union

Sport
- Sport: Track and field
- Event: 100 metres hurdles
Medal record
Representing Soviet Union
Summer Universiade
Silver medal – second place	1985 Kobe	100m hurdles

Nadiya Bodrova (born 13 July 1961) is a Ukrainian hurdler. She competed in the 100 metres hurdles at the 1996 Summer Olympics and the 2000 Summer Olympics.
