= Diana Yankey =

Ghanaian hurdler

Medal record

Women's athletics

Representing Ghana

African Championships
Gold medal – first place	1988 Annaba	4×100 m
Gold medal – first place	1989 Lagos	100 m hurdles
Gold medal – first place	1990 Cairo	100 m hurdles
Silver medal – second place	1988 Annaba	100 m hurdles
Silver medal – second place	1990 Cairo	4×100 m

Diana Yankey (in some sources "Dinah"; born 2 February 1967) is a retired Ghanaian athlete who specialized in the 100 metres hurdles. She represented her country at the 1987 World Championships in Athletics and the 1988 Summer Olympics. She was twice champion at the African Championships in Athletics and took silver medals at the 1987 All-Africa Games and the 1988 African Championships in Athletics.

== International competitions ==
Year	Competition	Venue	Position	Event	Notes
Representing Ghana
1987	All-Africa Games	Nairobi, Kenya	2nd	100 m hurdles	12.73
