= Rita Schönenberger =

Swiss heptathlete (born 1962)

Personal information
- Born: 3 December 1962 (age 63) Zurich, Switzerland

Sport
- Sport: Track and field

Rita Schönenberger (née Heggli; born 3 December 1962) is a retired Swiss heptathlete who also specialized in the 100 metres hurdles and the long jump.

In the hurdles, she finished fourth at the 1987 World Indoor Championships. She also competed at the 1986 European Championships, the 1987 World Championships, 1988 European Indoor Championships, the 1988 Olympic Games, the 1992 European Indoor Championships, and the 1993 World Indoor Championships without reaching the final.

She also competed in the heptathlon at the 1986 European Championships, without finishing the competition following three invalid long jumps. She later finished ninth in the long jump at the 1992 European Indoor Championships and competed at the 1994 European Championships without reaching the final.

Her personal best hurdle times were 8.07 seconds, achieved in March 1988 in Budapest; and 13.07 seconds, achieved in September 1987 in Lausanne.
