= Patrizia Lombardo =

Italian former hurdler and sprinter (born 1958)

Personal information
- Nationality: Italian
- Born: 3 September 1958 (age 67) Rome, Italy
- Height: 1.75 m (5 ft 9 in)
- Weight: 59 kg (130 lb)

Sport
- Country: Italy
- Sport: Athletics
- Event(s): 100 m hurdles 400 metres
- Club: Snia Milano

Achievements and titles
- Personal bests: 100 m hs: 13.10 (1987); 400 m: 53.54 (1984)
Medal record
Universiade
Bronze medal – third place	1981 Bucharest	4x100 m relay
Mediterranean Games
Gold medal – first place	1987 Latakia	100 m hs
Silver medal – second place	1979 Split	4x100 m relay
Bronze medal – third place	1979 Split	100 m hs

Patrizia Lombardo (Rome, 3 September 1958) is an Italian former hurdler (100 m hs) and sprinter (400 m).

== Biography ==
She was able to win 7 times the national championships in 4 different specialities. She has 41 caps in national team from 1976 to 1989.

== National records ==
- 100 metres hurdles: 13.10 ( (Italy) Livorno, 30 May 1987) - holder until 9 July 1988

== Achievements ==
Year	Competition	Venue	Position	Event	Performance	Notes
1979	Mediterranean Games	(Socialist Federal Republic of Yugoslavia) Split	3rd	100 metres hurdles	14.65	
1979	Mediterranean Games	(Socialist Federal Republic of Yugoslavia) Split	2nd	4x100 metres relay	45.32	
1981	Universiade	(Romania) Bucharest	3rd	4x100 metres relay	44.33	
1984	Olympic Games	(United States) Los Angeles	6th	4x400 metres relay	3:30.82	
1987	Mediterranean Games	(Syria) Latakia	1st	100 metres hurdles	13.41	

== National titles ==
- 3 wins in the 100 metres hurdles at the Italian Athletics Championships (1979, 1981, 1985)
- 1 win in the 200 metres at the Italian Athletics Championships (1979)
- 2 wins in the 60 metres hurdles at the Italian Athletics Indoor Championships (1980, 1987)
- 1 win in the 400 metres at the Italian Athletics Indoor Championships (1983)

== See also ==
- Italian all-time lists - 100 metres hurdles
