= Yordanka Donkova =

Bulgarian hurdler

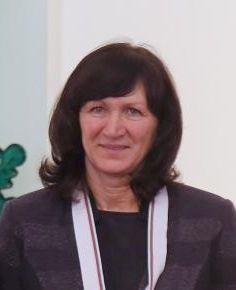

Medal record

Women's athletics

Representing Bulgaria

Olympic Games
Gold medal – first place	1988 Seoul	100 m hurdles
Bronze medal – third place	1992 Barcelona	100 m hurdles

World Indoor Championships
Silver medal – second place	1987 Indianapolis	60 m hurdles

European Championships
Gold medal – first place	1986 Stuttgart	100 m hurdles
Silver medal – second place	1982 Athens	100 m hurdles
Silver medal – second place	1986 Stuttgart	4×100 m
Bronze medal – third place	1994 Helsinki	100 m hurdles

Yordanka Lyubchova Donkova (Bulgarian: Йорданка Любчова Донкова; born 28 September 1961) is a Bulgarian former hurdling athlete, notable for winning an Olympic gold medal and bronze medal as well as nine medals at European indoor and outdoor championships. Donkova set four 100 m hurdles world records in 1986. Her fifth world record, a time of 12.21 set in 1988, stood for almost 28 years until broken in 2016 by Kendra Harrison.

In total, Donkova has 16 medals from major athletics tournaments. She was named the Bulgarian Sportsperson of the Year in 1986. She was also named the BTA Best Balkan Athlete of the Year in 1986.

== Personal life ==
Donkova suffered a childhood accident, which resulted in her losing two fingers on her right hand. She has three children. In 1991 she gave birth to a son, Zhivko Atanasov - professional football player, currently playing for Cherno More; twin girls Daniela and Desislava followed in 1996.

After the 1988 Seoul Olympics, Donkova received an offer to compete for the United States, but refused to change her national allegiance and continued to represent Bulgaria.

== Major achievements ==
Five-time Bulgarian National Champion at 100 m hurdles, 1980, 82, 84, 86 & 94.

Year	Competition	Venue	Position	Event	Notes
Representing Bulgaria
1980	Olympic Games	Moscow, Soviet Union	semi-final	100 m hurdles	13.39 sec
1982	European Indoor Championships	Milan, Italy	3rd	60 m hurdles	8.03
1982	European Championships	Athens, Greece	2nd	100m hurdles	12.54 (wind: 0.4 m/s)
1982	European Championships	Athens, Greece	4th	4 × 100 m relay	43.10
1984	European Indoor Championships	Gothenburg, Sweden	3rd	60 m hurdles	8.09
1986	European Championships	Stuttgart, West Germany	1st	100 m hurdles	12.38 (wind: -0.7 m/s) CR
1986	European Championships	Stuttgart, West Germany	2nd	4 × 100 m	42.68
1987	European Indoor Championships	Lievin, France	1st	60 m hurdles	7.79
1987	World Indoor Championships	Indianapolis, U.S.	2nd	60 m hurdles	7.85
1987	World Championships	Rome, Italy	4th	100 m hurdles	12.49
1988	Olympic Games	Seoul, South Korea	1st	100 m hurdles	12.38
1988	Olympic Games	Seoul, South Korea	5th	4 × 100 m	43.02
1989	European Indoor Championships	The Hague, Netherlands	1st	60 m hurdles	7.87
1992	European Indoor Championships	Genoa, Italy	3rd	60 m hurdles	8.03
1992	Olympic Games	Barcelona, Spain	3rd	100 m hurdles	12.70
1994	European Indoor Championships	Paris, France	1st	60 m hurdles	7.85
1994	European Championships	Helsinki, Finland	3rd	100 m hurdles	12.93 (wind: -1.7 m/s)

CR = Championship Record

== World records ==
Donkova set five world records for the 100 metres hurdles:

- 12.36 sec - 13 August 1986 (equalling the record of Grażyna Rabsztyn)
- 12.35 sec - 17 August 1986
- 12.29 sec - 17 August 1986
- 12.26 sec - 7 September 1986
- 12.21 sec - 20 August 1988 (the world record stood until 22 July 2016)

Sporting positions
Preceded by (Soviet Union) Tatyana Anisimova	Women's 100 m Hurdles Best Year Performance; 1982	Succeeded by (East Germany) Bettine Jahn
Preceded by (Bulgaria) Ginka Zagorcheva	Women's 100 m Hurdles Best Year Performance; 1986	Succeeded by (Bulgaria) Ginka Zagorcheva
Preceded by (Bulgaria) Ginka Zagorcheva	Women's 100 m Hurdles Best Year Performance; 1988	Succeeded by (East Germany) Cornelia Oschkenat
