= LaVonna Martin =

American hurdler (born 1966)

Personal information
- Full name: LaVonna Ann Martin-Floreal
- Born: LaVonna Ann Martin; November 18, 1966 (age 59) Dayton, Ohio, U.S.
Medal record
Women's athletics
Representing the United States
Olympic Games
| Silver medal – second place | 1992 Barcelona | 100 m hurdles |
World Indoor Championships
| Silver medal – second place | 1993 Toronto | 60 m hurdles |
Pan American Games
| Gold medal – first place | 1987 Indianapolis | 100 m hurdles |

LaVonna Ann Martin-Floreal, née Martin, (November 18, 1966) is an American former track and field athlete who competed mainly in the 100-meter hurdles. She won an Olympic silver medal in 1992.

== Career ==
She competed for the United States in the 1992 Summer Olympics held in Barcelona, Spain in the 100 meter hurdles and won the silver medal. She had also competed at the 1988 Summer Olympics in Seoul, where she reached the Semi-finals. In 1987 she won the gold medal at the Pan American Games.

Martin's silver medal in 1992 caused some controversy as it came following her return from a doping ban.

== Personal life ==
Martin-Floreal is a graduate of Trotwood-Madison High School, outside of Dayton, Ohio, as well as the University of Tennessee, Knoxville. She is married to former Canadian Olympic triple jumper Edrick Floreal, head track and field coach at University of Texas. They have a daughter, Mimi, and a son, EJ, who played for the Kentucky Wildcats men's basketball team but switched to Track and Field in 2017.

== International competitions ==
| Year | Competition | Venue | Position | Event | Notes |
Representing United States
| 1984 | Pan American Junior Championships | Nassau, Bahamas | 1st | 100m hurdles | 13.55 |
| 1987 | Pan American Games | Indianapolis, United States | 1st | 100m hurdles | 12.81 |
| 1987 | Universiade | Zagreb, Yugoslavia | 4th | 100m hurdles | 12.85 |
| 1987 | World Championships | Rome, Italy | 8th | 100m hurdles | 13.06 |
| 1988 | Olympic Games | Seoul, South Korea | semi-final | 100m hurdles | 13.29 |
| 1990 | Goodwill Games | Seattle, United States | 3rd | 100m hurdles | 12.89 |
| 1992 | Olympic Games | Barcelona, Spain | 2nd | 100m hurdles | 12.69 |
| 1993 | World Indoor Championships | Toronto, Canada | 2nd | 60m hurdles | 7.99 |
