= Florence Colle =

French athlete (born 1965)

Personal information
- Nationality: French
- Born: 4 December 1965 (age 60) Annecy, France
- Years active: 1983-1996

Sport
- Event: 100 m hurdles
Medal record
Representing France
Summer Universiade
Bronze medal – third place	1987 Zagreb	100m hurdles

Florence Colle (born 4 December 1965) is a French former track and field athlete, who specialized in the 100 metres hurdles. She placed fifth at the 1988 Seoul Olympics and sixth at the 1991 World Championships. Her personal best in the 100 metres hurdles is 12.73 seconds, set in 1991.

== Career ==
Born in Annecy, Colle is a two-time French national champion, winning the 100 m hurdles in 1987 and the long jump in 1989. Amongst her other successes, she was the inaugural long jump champion at the 1989 Jeux de la Francophonie, won a bronze medal in the 100m hurdles at the 1987 Summer Universiade, and reached the semi-finals of the 100m hurdles at the 1987 World Championships in Athletics.

Following her retirement from the sport she became a physician. As a doctor, she chose the speciality of physical medicine and rehabilitation. She started up the Physical Medicine and Rehabilitation service of the Sainte-Anne Hospital (Paris) after having done her clinic training under Prof. Yelnik of Hôpital Fernand-Widal. Colle was interviewed on the news show of France 2, "13 heures", on 29 October 2009, as part of the 7th World Day of Stroke.

== International competitions ==
Year	Competition	Venue	Position	Event	Notes
1983	European Junior Championships	Schwechat, Austria	6th	100 m hurdles	13.66
1987	Universiade	Zagreb, Yugoslavia	3rd	100 m hurdles	12.84
1987	World Championships	Rome, Italy	9th (sf)	100 m hurdles	13.04
1988	European Indoor Championships	Budapest, Hungary	6th	60 m hurdles	8.02
1988	Olympic Games	Seoul, South Korea	5th	100 m hurdles	12.98
1989	Francophone Games	Casablanca, Morocco	1st	Long jump	6.56 m
1991	World Championships	Tokyo, Japan	6th	100 m hurdles	13.01
(sf) Indicates overall position in qualifying round

== National titles ==
- French Athletics Championships
  - 100 m hurdles: 1987
  - Long jump: 1989
