= Claudia Zaczkiewicz =

German hurdler (born 1962)

Personal information
- Born: 4 July 1962 (age 64) Oberhausen, West Germany

Sport
- Sport: Track and field
Medal record
Representing West Germany
Olympic Games
| Bronze medal – third place | 1988 Seoul | 100 m hurdles |
Summer Universiade
| Bronze medal – third place | 1989 Duisburg | 100 m hurdles |
| Bronze medal – third place | 1989 Duisburg | 4x100m relay |

Claudia Zaczkiewicz (née Reidick; born 4 July 1962) is a German athlete who competed mainly in the 100 metre Hurdles.

== Biography ==
She competed for West Germany in the 1988 Summer Olympics held in Seoul, South Korea in the 100 metre hurdles where she won the bronze medal.
