= Marjan Olyslager =

Dutch sprinter (born 1962)

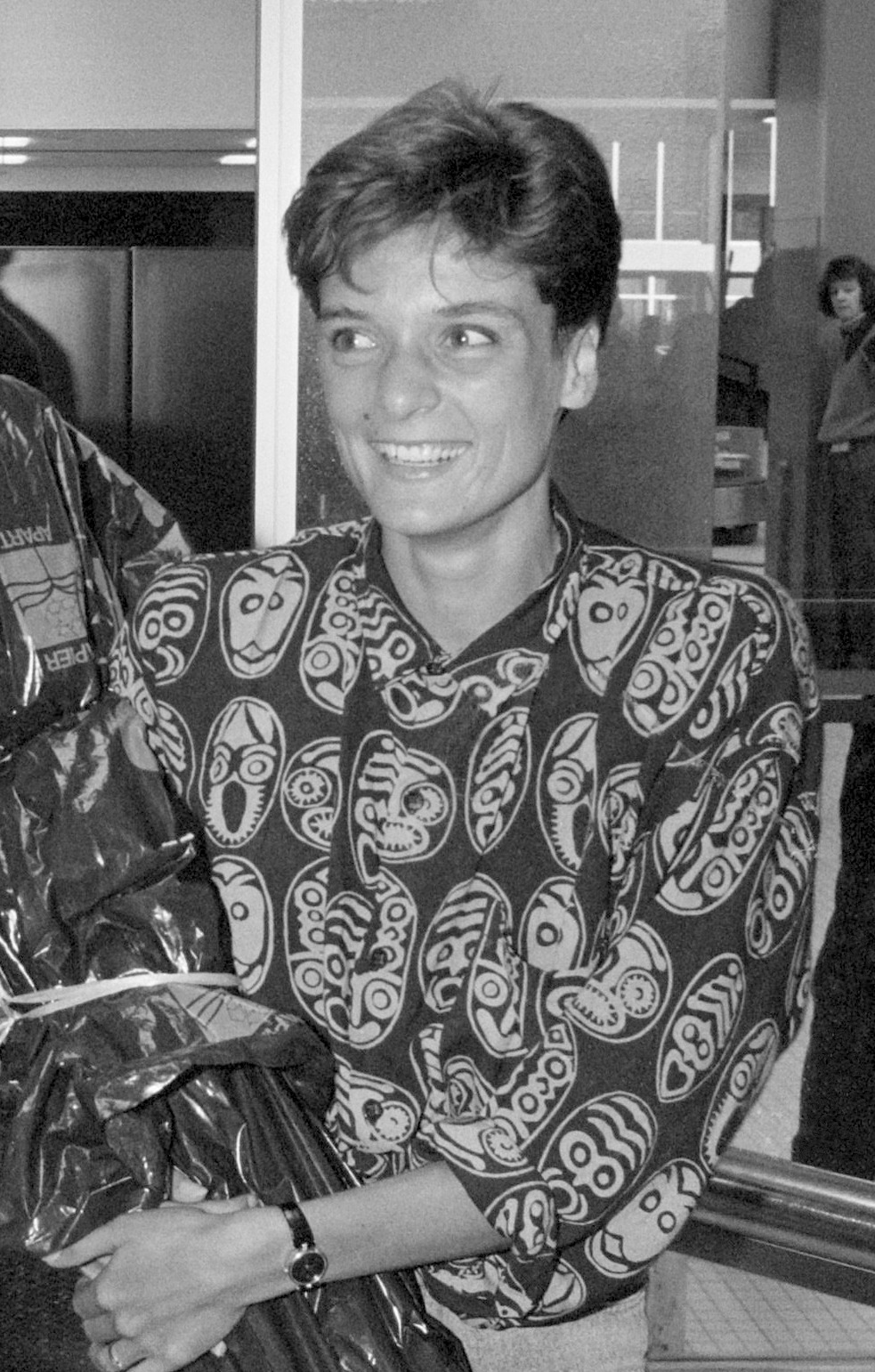
- Marjan Olyslager in 1988

Personal information
- Born: 8 March 1962 (age 64) The Hague, the Netherlands
- Height: 1.72 m (5 ft 8 in)
- Weight: 58 kg (128 lb)

Sport
- Sport: Hurdling, sprint
- Club: Atletiekvereniging Rotterdam
Medal record
Representing the Netherlands
European Indoor Championships
Silver medal – second place	1988 Budapest	60 m hurdles

Marjan Ingrid Olyslager (born 8 March 1962) is a retired Dutch sprinter. She competed at the 1988 Summer Olympics in the 100 m hurdles and 4 × 100 m relay, reaching the semifinals. She won a silver medal at the 1988 European Indoor Championships in the 60 m hurdles. Nationally, she set multiple records and won 12 titles in hurdles events.

== Biography ==
In 1981 Olyslager started competing as a senior and won her first national title. In 1984, she set a national record in the 100 m hurdles at 13.20 s, but fell 0.02 s short of the Olympic qualification. In May–August 1985 she improved that record four times, to 13.19, 13.07, 13.03, and finally 13.01 seconds. She broke the 13 second barrier in June 1988, at 12.93 s and qualified for the 1988 Olympics. The same year she won a European silver in the 60 m hurdles with a time of 7.92 s, as well as the Memorial Van Damme in the 100 m hurdles (12.83 s). However, in the Olympic semi-final, she hit a hurdle, and with a time of 13.08 s did not progress to the final.

After the Games she lost motivation for competitions. In Winter 1988 she married Roel Wingbermühle, started working as a system analyst and paid little attention to training. In 1989 she won a national 60 m hurdles title, and finished fourth at the European Indoor Championships and sixth at the World Indoor Championships, setting a new national record at 7.89 s. She retired in late 1989, but remained active as an athletics coach.
