= Ginka Zagorcheva =

Bulgarian hurdler

Personal information
- Born: 12 April 1958 (age 68) Rakovski, Bulgaria

Sport
- Sport: Track and field
Medal record
Representing Bulgaria
World Championships
Gold medal – first place	1983 Helsinki	100 m hurdles
Gold medal – first place	1987 Rome	100 m hurdles
World Indoor Championships
Bronze medal – third place	1987 Indianapolis	60 m hurdles
European Championships
Silver medal – second place	1986 Stuttgart	4×100 m
Bronze medal – third place	1986 Stuttgart	100 m hurdles
European Indoor Championships
Silver medal – second place	1985 Athens	60 m hurdles
Bronze medal – third place	1987 Lievin	60 m hurdles
Summer Universiade
Gold medal – first place	1985 Kobe	100 m hurdles
Bronze medal – third place	1985 Kobe	4x100m relay

Ginka Serafimova Zagorcheva-Boycheva, Bulgarian: Гинка Загорчева-Бойчева (born 12 April 1958) is a former hurdling athlete from Bulgaria. She was born in Plovdiv, and is most notable for winning the 100 metres hurdles at the 1987 World Championships. She held the world record for a year with a time of 12.25 sec, until it was beaten by Yordanka Donkova in August 1988. She also competed in the women's 100 metres hurdles at the 1988 Summer Olympics.

== National titles ==
- Five-time Bulgarian National Champion at 100 m hurdles, 1983, 85, 87, 89 & 90.

== International competitions ==
Year	Competition	Venue	Position	Event	Notes
Representing Bulgaria
1982	European Championships	Athens, Greece	8th	100 m hurdles	13.14 sec
1983	World Championships	Helsinki, Finland	3rd	100 m hurdles	12.62
1984	Friendship Games	Prague, Czechoslovakia	6th	100 m hurdles	12.86
1985	World Indoor Games	Paris, France	5th	60 m hurdles	8.13
1985	European Indoor Championships	Athens, Greece	2nd	60 m hurdles	8.02
1985	IAAF World Cup	Canberra, Australia	2nd	100 m hurdles	12.72
1986	European Championships	Stuttgart, West Germany	3rd	100 m hurdles	12.70
1987	European Indoor Championships	Lievin, France	3rd	60 m hurdles	7.92
1987	World Indoor Championships	Indianapolis, U.S.	3rd	60 m hurdles	7.99
1987	World Championships	Rome, Italy	1st	100 m hurdles	12.34
1988	European Indoor Championships	Budapest, Hungary	4th	100 m hurdles	7.95
1988	Olympic Games	Seoul, South Korea	heats	100 m hurdles	dnf
1990	European Championships	Split, Yugoslavia	6th	100 m hurdles	13.02

Sporting positions
Preceded by (Poland) Lucyna Kalek	Women's 100m Hurdles Best Year Performance; 1985	Succeeded by (Bulgaria) Yordanka Donkova
Preceded by (Bulgaria) Yordanka Donkova	Women's 100m Hurdles Best Year Performance; 1987	Succeeded by (Bulgaria) Yordanka Donkova
