= Athletics at the 1992 Summer Olympics – Women's 100 metres hurdles =

Women's 100 metres hurdles at the Games of the XXV Olympiad
- Venue: Estadi Olímpic de Montjuïc
- Date: 5 August 1992 (heats and quarter-finals); 6 August 1992 (semi-finals and final)
- Competitors: 37 from 22 nations
- Winning time: 12.64

Medalists
1st place, gold medalist(s)		Voula Patoulidou; Greece
2nd place, silver medalist(s)		LaVonna Martin; United States
3rd place, bronze medalist(s)		Yordanka Donkova; Bulgaria

Official Video Highlights @ 6:05

These are the official results of the women's 100 metres hurdles at the 1992 Summer Olympics in Barcelona, Spain.

Despite the presence of the world record holder Yordanka Donkova (who had her career peak four years earlier), Gail Devers came into this race as the favorite. Though her Olympic history shows her winning the 100 metres twice, the first time earlier in this Olympics, she primarily made her career as a hurdler. And true to form, Devers had a commanding lead in this race, until the final hurdle. Devers came up short and hit the hurdle, foot first, hard, knocking her off balance. She stumbled toward the finish line, falling on the last step, but still finished fifth, .001 out of fourth place. Voula Patoulidou was the gold medalist, followed by LaVonna Martin and Donkova.

== Medalists ==
Gold	Voula Patoulidou; Greece
Silver	LaVonna Martin; United States
Bronze	Yordanka Donkova; Bulgaria

== Records ==
These were the standing world and Olympic records (in seconds) prior to the 1992 Summer Olympics.

World record	12.21	(Bulgaria) Yordanka Donkova	Stara Zagora (BUL)	August 20, 1988
Olympic record	12.38	(Bulgaria) Yordanka Donkova	Seoul (KOR)	September 30, 1988

== Final ==
Wind: +0.4 m/s

Rank	Lane	Athlete	Nation	Time	Notes
1st place, gold medalist(s)	5	Paraskevi Patoulidou	Greece	12.64	
2nd place, silver medalist(s)	4	LaVonna Martin	United States	12.69	
3rd place, bronze medalist(s)	6	Yordanka Donkova	Bulgaria	12.70	
4	3	Lynda Tolbert	United States	12.75	
5	2	Gail Devers	United States	12.75	
6	7	Aliuska López	Cuba	12.87	
7	8	Natalya Kolovanova	Unified Team	13.01	
8	1	Odalys Adams	Cuba	13.57	

== Semi finals ==
Heat 1. Wind: -1.9 m/s

Rank	Athlete	Nation	Time	Notes
1	Lynda Tolbert	United States	13.10	
2	Gail Devers	United States	13.14	
3	Natalya Kolovanova	Unified Team	13.15	
4	Aliuska López	Cuba	13.16	
5	Anne Piquereau	France	13.32	
6	Gillian Russell	Jamaica	13.35	
7	Zhang Yu	China	13.39	
8	Kristin Patzwahl	Germany	13.44	
9	Brigitta Bukovec	Slovenia	13.68	

Heat 2. Wind: +0.0 m/s

Rank	Athlete	Nation	Time	Notes
1	LaVonna Martin	United States	12.81	
2	Yordanka Donkova	Bulgaria	12.87	
3	Voula Patoulidou	Greece	12.88	
4	Odalys Adams	Cuba	13.14	
5	Marina Azyabina	Unified Team	13.22	
6	Gabriele Roth	Germany	13.22	
7	Dionne Rose	Jamaica	13.22	
8	Cécile Cinelu	France	13.24	
—	Lyudmila Narozhilenko	Unified Team	DNS	

== Quarterfinals ==
Heat 1. Wind: -1.5 m/s

Rank	Athlete	Nation	Time	Notes
1	LaVonna Martin	United States	12.82	
2	Aliuska López	Cuba	13.01	
3	Gillian Russell	Jamaica	13.23	
4	Marina Azyabina	Unified Team	13.26	
5	Brigitta Bukovec	Slovenia	13.28	
6	Zhang Yu	China	13.28	
7	Katie Anderson	Canada	13.31	
8	Sylvia Dethier	Belgium	13.32	

Heat 2. Wind: +1.4 m/s

Rank	Athlete	Nation	Time	Notes
1	Yordanka Donkova	Bulgaria	12.84	
2	Lynda Tolbert	United States	12.96	
3	Voula Patoulidou	Greece	13.05	
4	Natalya Kolovanova	Unified Team	13.06	
5	Cécile Cinelu	France	13.07	
6	Kristin Patzwahl	Germany	13.16	
7	Dionne Rose	Jamaica	13.17	
8	Liliana Nastase	Romania	13.33	

Heat 3. Wind: -0.7 m/s

Rank	Athlete	Nation	Time	Notes
1	Gail Devers	United States	12.76	
2	Lyudmila Narozhilenko	Unified Team	13.06	
3	Anne Piquereau	France	13.17	
4	Odalys Adams	Cuba	13.26	
5	Gabriele Roth	Germany	13.28	
6	Zhu Yuqing	China	13.31	
7	Jacqui Agyepong	Great Britain	13.36	
8	Michelle Freeman	Jamaica	15.84	

== Heats ==
Heat 1. Wind: -1.5 m/s

Rank	Athlete	Nation	Time	Notes
1	Lyudmila Narozhilenko	Unified Team	13.04	
2	Liliana Nastase	Romania	13.23	
3	Cécile Cinelu	France	13.40	
4	Brigitta Bukovec	Slovenia	13.45	
5	María José Mardomingo	Spain	13.58	
6	Anu Kaljurand	Estonia	13.81	
7	Eunice Barber	Sierra Leone	15.01	
—	Yasmina Kettab-Azzizi	Algeria	DNS	

Heat 2. Wind: +0.0 m/s

Rank	Athlete	Nation	Time	Notes
1	Michelle Freeman	Jamaica	12.90	
2	Kristin Patzwahl	Germany	13.11	
3	Gail Devers	United States	13.19	
4	Nataliya Kolovanova	Unified Team	13.20	
5	Zhu Yuqing	China	13.22	
6	Lesley-Ann Skeete	Great Britain	13.42	
7	Nguyễn Thị Thu Hằng	Vietnam	15.16	

Heat 3. Wind: -0.4 m/s

Rank	Athlete	Nation	Time	Notes
1	Yordanka Donkova	Bulgaria	12.96	
2	Aliuska López	Cuba	13.08	
3	Marina Azyabina	Unified Team	13.10	
4	Jacqui Agyepong	Great Britain	13.25	
5	Dionne Rose	Jamaica	13.29	
6	Katie Anderson	Canada	13.33	
7	Monique Ewanjé-Épée	France	13.73	
8	Louisette Renee Thobi	Cameroon	14.37	

Heat 4. Wind: +0.0 m/s

Rank	Athlete	Nation	Time	Notes
1	LaVonna Martin	United States	12.82	
2	Gillian Russell	Jamaica	13.07	
3	Sylvia Dethier	Belgium	13.19	
4	Zhang Yu	China	13.26	
5	Nicole Ramalalanirina	Madagascar	13.40	
6	Sriyani Kulawansa	Sri Lanka	13.55	
—	Caren Jung	Germany	DSQ	
—	Julie Baumann	Switzerland	DNS	

Heat 5. Wind: -0.7 m/s

Rank	Athlete	Nation	Time	Notes
1	Lynda Tolbert	United States	12.96	
2	Anne Piquereau	France	13.11	
3	Gabriele Roth	Germany	13.12	
4	Voula Patoulidou	Greece	13.14	
5	Odalys Adams	Cuba	13.28	
6	Kay Morley-Brown	Great Britain	13.44	
7	Chan Sau Ying	Hong Kong	13.88	
8	Elizabeta Pavlovska	Independent Olympic Participants	14.26	

== See also ==
- 1986 European World Championships 100m Hurdles (Stuttgart)
- 1987 Women's World Championships 100m Hurdles (Rome)
- 1988 Women's Olympic 100m Hurdles (Seoul)
- 1990 European World Championships 100m Hurdles (Split)
- 1991 Women's World Championships 100m Hurdles (Tokyo)
- 1993 Women's World Championships 100m Hurdles (Stuttgart)
- 1994 European World Championships 100m Hurdles (Helsinki)
