= 1994 European Athletics Championships – Women's 100 metres hurdles =

Women's 100 metres hurdles at the European Athletics Championships

These are the official results of the Women's 100 metres hurdles event at the 1994 European Championships in Helsinki, Finland, held at Helsinki Olympic Stadium on 8 and 9 August 1994.

== Medalists ==
Gold	Svetla Dimitrova; Bulgaria
Silver	Yuliya Graudyn; Russia
Bronze	Yordanka Donkova; Bulgaria

== Results ==
=== Final ===
9 August Wind: -1.7 m/s

Rank	Name	Nationality	Time	Notes
1st place, gold medalist(s)	Svetla Dimitrova	Bulgaria	12.72	
2nd place, silver medalist(s)	Yuliya Graudyn	Russia	12.93	
3rd place, bronze medalist(s)	Yordanka Donkova	Bulgaria	12.93	
4	Brigita Bukovec	Slovenia	13.01	
5	Tatyana Reshetnikova	Russia	13.06	
6	Julie Baumann	Switzerland	13.10	
7	Jackie Agyepong	United Kingdom	13.17	
8	Anne Piquereau	France	13.25	

=== Semi-finals ===
9 August

==== Semi-final 1 ====
Wind: -0.4 m/s

Rank	Name	Nationality	Time	Notes
1	Svetla Dimitrova	Bulgaria	12.60	Q
2	Yuliya Graudyn	Russia	12.78	Q
3	Julie Baumann	Switzerland	12.82	Q
4	Anne Piquereau	France	12.93	Q
5	Clova Court	United Kingdom	13.04	
6	Carla Tuzzi	Italy	13.05	
7	Monica Grefstad	Norway	13.11	
8	Nadezhda Bodrova	Ukraine	13.15	

==== Semi-final 2 ====
Wind: -1.9 m/s

Rank	Name	Nationality	Time	Notes
1	Tatyana Reshetnikova	Russia	12.92	Q
2	Brigita Bukovec	Slovenia	12.94	Q
3	Yordanka Donkova	Bulgaria	13.08	Q
4	Jackie Agyepong	United Kingdom	13.28	Q
5	Kristin Patzwahl	Germany	13.31	
6	María José Mardomingo	Spain	13.35	
7	Marina Azyabina	Russia	13.42	
8	Nadège Joseph	France	13.44	

=== Heats ===
8 August

==== Heat 1 ====
Wind: 1.1 m/s

Rank	Name	Nationality	Time	Notes
1	Jackie Agyepong	United Kingdom	12.97	Q
2	Marina Azyabina	Russia	12.98	Q
3	Nadezhda Bodrova	Ukraine	13.12	Q
4	Monica Grefstad	Norway	13.19	q
5	Lidiya Yurkova	Belarus	13.25	
6	Isabel Pereira	Portugal	13.45	
7	Jutta Kemilä	Finland	13.49	

==== Heat 2 ====
Wind: 0.8 m/s

Rank	Name	Nationality	Time	Notes
1	Svetla Dimitrova	Bulgaria	12.72	Q
2	Brigita Bukovec	Slovenia	12.96	Q
3	Kristin Patzwahl	Germany	13.21	Q
4	María José Mardomingo	Spain	13.24	q
5	Monique Éwanjé-Épée	France	13.29	
6	Sandra Barreiro	Portugal	13.44	
7	Guðrún Arnardóttir	Iceland	13.53	

==== Heat 3 ====
Wind: -0.6 m/s

Rank	Name	Nationality	Time	Notes
1	Tatyana Reshetnikova	Russia	12.89	Q
2	Julie Baumann	Switzerland	12.91	Q
3	Anne Piquereau	France	13.27	Q
4	Samantha Farquharson	United Kingdom	13.33	
5	Erica Niculae	Romania	13.52	
6	Iina Pekkola	Finland	13.72	
	Elizabeta Pavlovska	Macedonia	DNS	

==== Heat 4 ====
Wind: 0.2 m/s

Rank	Name	Nationality	Time	Notes
1	Yuliya Graudyn	Russia	12.93	Q
2	Carla Tuzzi	Italy	13.03	Q
3	Yordanka Donkova	Bulgaria	13.06	Q
4	Nadège Joseph	France	13.23	q
5	Clova Court	United Kingdom	13.23	q
6	Sylvia Dethiér	Belgium	13.45	
7	Véronique Linster	Luxembourg	13.68	

== Participation ==
According to an unofficial count, 27 athletes from 18 countries participated in the event. The announced athlete from Macedonia did not show.

- Belarus (1)
- Belgium (1)
- Bulgaria (2)
- Finland (2)
- France (3)
- Germany (1)
- Iceland (1)
- Italy (1)
- Luxembourg (1)
- Norway (1)
- Portugal (2)
- Romania (1)
- Russia (3)
- Slovenia (1)
- Spain (1)
- Switzerland (1)
- Ukraine (1)
- United Kingdom (3)

== See also ==
- 1990 Women's European Championships 100m Hurdles (Split)
- 1991 Women's World Championships 100m Hurdles (Tokyo)
- 1992 Women's Olympic 100m Hurdles (Barcelona)
- 1993 Women's World Championships 100m Hurdles (Stuttgart)
- 1995 Women's World Championships 100m Hurdles (Gothenburg)
- 1996 Women's Olympic 100m Hurdles (Atlanta)
- 1997 Women's World Championships 100m Hurdles (Athens)
- 1998 Women's European Championships 100m Hurdles (Budapest)
