= Michelle Edwards (hurdler) =

British hurdler (born 1969)

Michelle Campbell née Edwards
Personal information
- Nationality: British (English)
- Born: 24 February 1969 (age 56) England

Sport
- Sport: Athletics
- Event: hurdles
- Club: Haringey AC

Michelle Campbell (née Edwards, born 24 February 1969) is a British former hurdler who competed in the 100 metres hurdles at the 1991 World Championships in Tokyo.

== Biography ==
Edwards competed for Haringey AC. She finished third behind Kay Morley and Lesley-Ann Skeete at both the 1989 AAA Indoor Championships 60m hurdles in 8.47 secs, and at the 1989 UK Championships in the 100m hurdles in 13.48 secs. She achieved her lifetime best of 13.26 on 3 August 1990 in Birmingham, when finishing fourth behind Skeete, Morley and Jacqui Agyepong at the AAA Championships.

In 1991, she was third at the UK Championships behind Skeete and Louise Fraser, running 13.98 into a near four metre head-wind. Two months later she was fifth at the 1991 AAA Championships behind Sally Gunnell, Skeete, Morley-Brown and the American Jackie Humphrey, and earned selection for the 1991 World Championships in Tokyo, where she was eliminated in the heats in 13.50.

Edwards married American hurdler Tonie Campbell, and competing as Michelle Campbell, she ran a wind-assisted 13.08 (+4.0) on 26 May 1995 in California. She went on to run 13.36 to finish second in the 100m hurdles behind Melani Wilkins in the 1995 AAA Championships.

== Competition record ==
Year	Competition	Venue	Position	Event	Notes
Representing Great Britain
1991	World Championships	Tokyo, Japan	26th (h)	100 m hurdles	13.50
National Championships
1989	UK Championships	Jarrow, UK	3rd	100 m hurdles	13.48
1990	AAA Championships	Birmingham, UK	4th	100 m hurdles	13.26
1991	UK Championships	Cardiff, UK	3rd	100 m hurdles	13.98
1991	AAA Championships	Birmingham, UK	5th	100 m hurdles	13.??
1992	UK Championships	Sheffield, UK	4th	100 m hurdles	13.??
1995	AAA Championships	Birmingham, UK	2nd	100 m hurdles	13.36
(h) Indicates overall position in qualifying heats
