= 1991 IAAF World Indoor Championships – Women's 60 metres hurdles =

The women's 60 metres hurdles event at the 1991 IAAF World Indoor Championships was held on 9 March.

== Medalists ==
Gold	Silver	Bronze
Ludmila Narozhilenko; Soviet Union	Monique Éwanjé-Épée; France	Aliuska López; Cuba

== Results ==
=== Heats ===
First 3 of each heat (Q) and next 4 fastest (q) qualified for the semifinals.

Rank	Heat	Name	Nationality	Time	Notes
1	2	Anne Piquereau	France	7.98	Q
1	4	Monique Éwanjé-Épée	France	7.98	Q
3	1	Ludmila Narozhilenko	Soviet Union	8.00	Q
3	2	Mihaela Pogăcean	Romania	8.00	Q
5	3	Lidiya Yurkova	Soviet Union	8.04	Q
6	1	Kim McKenzie	United States	8.07	Q
7	3	Kristin Patzwahl	Germany	8.12	Q
8	3	Liliana Năstase	Romania	8.13	Q
9	2	Brigita Bukovec	Yugoslavia	8.16	Q, NR
10	1	Sylvia Dethier	Belgium	8.17	Q, NR
10	2	Lesley-Ann Skeete	Great Britain	8.17	q
12	4	Claudia Zaczkiewicz	Germany	8.20	Q
13	3	Louise Fraser	Great Britain	8.21	q
14	1	Odalys Adams	Cuba	8.22	q
14	4	Aliuska López	Cuba	8.22	Q
16	1	María José Mardomingo	Spain	8.25	q
17	3	Cheryl Wilson	United States	8.28	
18	2	Blanka Henešová	Czechoslovakia	8.31	
19	4	Ulrike Beierl	Austria	8.33	
20	2	Yasmina Azzizi	Algeria	8.42	AR
20	4	Pang Jiewen	China	8.42	
22	4	Ana Barrenechea	Spain	8.47	
23	1	Nezha Bidouane	Morocco	8.74	NR
24	3	Flora Hyacinth	United States Virgin Islands	8.85	
25	1	Deborah de Souza	Peru	9.42	

=== Semifinals ===
First 4 of each semifinal (Q) qualified directly for the final.

Rank	Heat	Name	Nationality	Time	Notes
1	1	Monique Éwanjé-Épée	France	7.90	Q
2	2	Ludmila Narozhilenko	Soviet Union	7.93	Q
3	2	Anne Piquereau	France	7.96	Q
4	1	Mihaela Pogăcean	Romania	8.00	Q
5	2	Odalys Adams	Cuba	8.02	Q
6	2	Kim McKenzie	United States	8.02	Q
7	1	Lidiya Yurkova	Soviet Union	8.03	Q
8	1	Aliuska López	Cuba	8.10	Q
8	2	Kristin Patzwahl	Germany	8.10	
10	1	Lesley-Ann Skeete	Great Britain	8.15	
11	1	Brigita Bukovec	Yugoslavia	8.16	=NR
12	2	Liliana Năstase	Romania	8.19	
13	2	Sylvia Dethier	Belgium	8.21	
14	2	Louise Fraser	Great Britain	8.24	
15	1	María José Mardomingo	Spain	8.28	
16	1	Claudia Zaczkiewicz	Germany	8.31	

=== Final ===
Rank	Lane	Name	Nationality	Time	Notes
1st place, gold medalist(s)	4	Ludmila Narozhilenko	Soviet Union	7.88	
2nd place, silver medalist(s)	5	Monique Éwanjé-Épée	France	7.90	
3rd place, bronze medalist(s)	8	Aliuska López	Cuba	8.03	
4	2	Lidiya Yurkova	Soviet Union	8.03	
5	3	Anne Piquereau	France	8.04	
6	6	Mihaela Pogăcean	Romania	8.04	
7	1	Kim McKenzie	United States	8.05	
8	7	Odalys Adams	Cuba	8.11	
