= 1990 European Athletics Championships – Women's 100 metres hurdles =

Women's 100 metres hurdles at the European Athletics Championships

These are the official results of the Women's 100 metres hurdles event at the 1990 European Championships in Split, Yugoslavia, held at Stadion Poljud on 29 and 30 August 1990.

== Medalists ==
Gold	Monique Éwanjé-Épée; France
Silver	Gloria Siebert; East Germany
Bronze	Lidiya Yurkova; Soviet Union

== Results ==
=== Final ===
30 August Wind: -0.9 m/s

Rank	Name	Nationality	Time	Notes
1st place, gold medalist(s)	Monique Éwanjé-Épée	France	12.79	
2nd place, silver medalist(s)	Gloria Siebert	East Germany	12.91	
3rd place, bronze medalist(s)	Lidiya Yurkova	Soviet Union	12.92	
4	Cornelia Oschkenat	East Germany	12.94	
5	Ludmila Narozhilenko	Soviet Union	12.97	
6	Ginka Zagorcheva	Bulgaria	13.02	
7	Kristin Patzwahl	East Germany	13.25	
	Gabriele Lippe	West Germany	DNF	

=== Semi-finals ===
29 August

==== Semi-final 1 ====
Wind: 0.3 m/s

Rank	Name	Nationality	Time	Notes
1	Gloria Siebert	East Germany	12.75	Q
2	Ludmila Narozhilenko	Soviet Union	12.78	Q
3	Gabriele Lippe	West Germany	12.92	Q
4	Cornelia Oschkenat	East Germany	12.93	Q
5	Natalya Grigoryeva	Soviet Union	12.98	
6	Christine Hurtlin	France	13.03	
7	Kay Morley	United Kingdom	13.22	
8	Brigita Bukovec	Yugoslavia	13.46	

==== Semi-final 2 ====
Wind: 1.1 m/s

Rank	Name	Nationality	Time	Notes
1	Monique Éwanjé-Épée	France	12.66	Q
2	Ginka Zagorcheva	Bulgaria	12.81	Q
3	Lidiya Yurkova	Soviet Union	12.81	Q
4	Kristin Patzwahl	East Germany	13.02	Q
5	Paraskeví Patoulídou	Greece	13.07	
6	Anne Piquereau	France	13.08	
7	Lesley-Ann Skeete	United Kingdom	13.37	
8	María José Mardomingo	Spain	13.40	

=== Heats ===
29 August

==== Heat 1 ====
Wind: 0.5 m/s

Rank	Name	Nationality	Time	Notes
1	Natalya Grigoryeva	Soviet Union	12.81	Q
2	Ginka Zagorcheva	Bulgaria	12.82	Q
3	Kristin Patzwahl	East Germany	12.97	Q
4	Gabriele Lippe	West Germany	13.01	Q
5	Lesley-Ann Skeete	United Kingdom	13.07	q
6	Anne Piquereau	France	13.18	q
7	María José Mardomingo	Spain	13.41	q

==== Heat 2 ====
Wind: 0.2 m/s

Rank	Name	Nationality	Time	Notes
1	Monique Éwanjé-Épée	France	12.72	Q
2	Ludmila Narozhilenko	Soviet Union	12.78	Q
3	Cornelia Oschkenat	East Germany	12.97	Q
4	Kay Morley	United Kingdom	13.21	Q
5	Sylvia Dethiér	Belgium	13.51	
6	Claudia Zaczkiewicz	West Germany	13.55	

==== Heat 3 ====
Wind: -0.8 m/s

Rank	Name	Nationality	Time	Notes
1	Gloria Siebert	East Germany	12.74	Q
2	Lidiya Yurkova	Soviet Union	12.77	Q
3	Christine Hurtlin	France	13.23	Q
4	Paraskeví Patoulídou	Greece	13.36	Q
5	Brigita Bukovec	Yugoslavia	13.46	q
6	Ana Barrenechea	Spain	13.85	
	Jackie Agyepong	United Kingdom	DNF	

== Participation ==
According to an unofficial count, 20 athletes from 10 countries participated in the event.

- Belgium (1)
- Bulgaria (1)
- East Germany (3)
- France (3)
- Greece (1)
- Soviet Union (3)
- Spain (2)
- United Kingdom (3)
- West Germany (2)
- Yugoslavia (1)

== See also ==
- 1988 Women's Olympic 100m Hurdles (Seoul)
- 1991 Women's World Championships 100m Hurdles (Tokyo)
- 1992 Women's Olympic 100m Hurdles (Barcelona)
