= Athletics at the 1993 Summer Universiade – Women's 100 metres hurdles =

The women's 100 metres hurdles event at the 1993 Summer Universiade was held at the UB Stadium in Buffalo, United States on 17 and 18 July 1993.

== Medalists ==
Gold	Silver	Bronze
Dawn Bowles; United States	Marsha Guialdo; United States	Nicole Ramalalanirina; Madagascar

== Results ==
=== Heats ===
Rank	Heat	Athlete	Nationality	Time	Notes
1	2	Dawn Bowles	United States	12.76	Q
2	2	Nicole Ramalalanirina	Madagascar	12.92	Q
3	3	Marsha Guialdo	United States	13.11	Q
	2	Ime Akpan	Nigeria	~~13.13~~	q, DQ, Doping
4	3	Sonia Paquette	Canada	13.29	Q
5	1	Keturah Anderson	Canada	13.33	Q
6	1	Gillian Russell	Jamaica	13.37	Q
6	3	Taiwo Aladefa	Nigeria	13.37	q
8	3	Sam Baker	Great Britain	13.43	
9	2	Chan Sau Ying	Hong Kong	13.44	
10	1	Keri Maddox	Great Britain	13.45	
11	2	Lena Solli	Norway	13.56	
12	1	Giannina Re	Italy	13.59	
13	1	Petra Hassinger	Germany	13.62	
14	1	Elisabeta Anghel	Romania	13.80	
15	3	Rumini	Indonesia	14.39	
16	2	Diana Radaviciene	Lithuania	14.48	
17	1	Martini Kustiah	Indonesia	14.58	
18	3	Sonali Nanayakkara	Sri Lanka	15.52	
	2	Oraidis Ramírez	Cuba	DNF	
	3	Joyce Meléndez	Puerto Rico	DNF	

=== Final ===
Wind: -1.2 m/s

Rank	Lane	Athlete	Nationality	Time	Notes
	6	Ime Akpan	Nigeria	~~13.11~~	DQ, Doping
1st place, gold medalist(s)	4	Dawn Bowles	United States	13.16	
2nd place, silver medalist(s)	3	Marsha Guialdo	United States	13.24	
3rd place, bronze medalist(s)	5	Nicole Ramalalanirina	Madagascar	13.28	
4	2	Gillian Russell	Jamaica	13.46	
5	7	Sonia Paquette	Canada	13.53	
6	1	Taiwo Aladefa	Nigeria	13.55	
	8	Keturah Anderson	Canada	DNF	
