= 1989 European Athletics Indoor Championships – Women's 60 metres hurdles =

The women's 60 metres hurdles event at the 1989 European Athletics Indoor Championships was held on 19 February.

== Medalists ==
Gold	Silver	Bronze
Yordanka Donkova; Bulgaria	Ludmila Narozhilenko; Soviet Union	Gabriele Lippe; West Germany

== Results ==
=== Heats ===
First 3 from each heat (Q) and the next 2 fastest (q) qualified for the semifinals.

Rank	Heat	Name	Nationality	Time	Notes
1	1	Ludmila Narozhilenko	Soviet Union	7.95	Q
2	2	Marjan Olyslager	Netherlands	7.98	Q
3	1	Yordanka Donkova	Bulgaria	8.02	Q
4	2	Gabriele Lippe	West Germany	8.05	Q
5	2	Monique Éwanjé-Épée	France	8.17	Q
6	2	Gretha Tromp	Netherlands	8.17	q
7	2	Sylvia Dethier	Belgium	8.21	q
8	1	Ine Langenhuizen	Netherlands	8.24	Q
9	1	Christine Hurtlin	France	8.26	
10	1	Margita Papić	Yugoslavia	8.31	
10	1	Lesley-Ann Skeete	Great Britain	8.31	
10	2	Florence Colle	France	8.31	
13	1	Carla Tuzzi	Italy	8.36	
14	2	Filiz Türker	Turkey	8.91	

=== Final ===
Rank	Name	Nationality	Time	Notes
1st place, gold medalist(s)	Yordanka Donkova	Bulgaria	7.87	
2nd place, silver medalist(s)	Ludmila Narozhilenko	Soviet Union	7.94	
3rd place, bronze medalist(s)	Gabriele Lippe	West Germany	7.96	
4	Marjan Olyslager	Netherlands	8.01	
5	Monique Éwanjé-Épée	France	8.22	
6	Gretha Tromp	Netherlands	8.22	
7	Ine Langenhuizen	Netherlands	8.32	
8	Sylvia Dethier	Belgium	8.36	
