= Athletics at the 1995 Summer Universiade – Women's 4 × 100 metres relay =

The women's 4 × 100 metres relay event at the 1995 Summer Universiade was held on 3 September at the Hakatanomori Athletic Stadium in Fukuoka, Japan.

== Results ==
Rank	Lane	Nation	Athletes	Time	Notes
1st place, gold medalist(s)	4	United States	Cheryl Taplin, Inger Miller, Juan Ball, Kenya Walton	43.58	
2nd place, silver medalist(s)	7	Russia	Natalya Anisimova, Oksana Dyachenko, Olga Voronova, Zhanna Levacheva	44.06	
3rd place, bronze medalist(s)	5	Nigeria	Ime Akpan, Taiwo Aladefa, Pat Itanyi, Mary Tombiri	44.08	
4	8	France	Marie-Joëlle Dogbo, Frédérique Bangué, Odile Singa, Maguy Nestoret	44.10	
5	6	Japan	Madoka Miki, Chika Nagano, Kaori Yoshida, Toshie Kitada	44.80	
6	1	Great Britain	Joice Maduaka, Catherine Murphy, Marcia Richardson, Sharon Williams	44.93	
7	2	Chinese Taipei	Hsu Pei-Chin, Liu Shu-Hua, Kao Yuh-Chuan, Wang Huei-Chen	45.35	
8	3	Canada	Sonia Paquette, Nicole Commissiong, LaDonna Antoine, France Gareau	45.84	
