= Athletics at the 1990 Commonwealth Games – Women's 100 metres hurdles =

Women's 100 metres hurdles at the Commonwealth Games

The women's 100 metres hurdles event at the 1990 Commonwealth Games was held on 1 and 2 February at the Mount Smart Stadium in Auckland.

== Medalists ==
Gold	Silver	Bronze
Kay Morley; Wales	Sally Gunnell; England	Lesley-Ann Skeete; England

== Results ==
=== Heats ===
Qualification: First 4 of each heat (Q) and the next 1 fastest (q) qualified for the final.

Wind:
Heat 1: +2.3 m/s, Heat 2: +3.4 m/s

Rank	Heat	Name	Nationality	Time	Notes
1	2	Lesley-Ann Skeete	England	13.01	Q
2	1	Jane Flemming	Australia	13.04	Q
3	1	Sally Gunnell	England	13.14	Q
4	2	Glynis Nunn-Cearns	Australia	13.24	Q
5	2	Helen Pirovano	New Zealand	13.47	Q
6	2	Jenny Laurendet	Australia	13.49	Q
7	2	Kay Morley	Wales	13.51	q
8	1	Louise Fraser	England	13.54	Q
9	1	Judith Robinson	Northern Ireland	13.55	Q
10	1	Diana Yankey	Ghana	13.62	
11	2	Donna Smellie	Canada	13.68	
12	2	Leslie Estwick	Canada	13.96	
13	2	Chan Sau Ying	Hong Kong	14.06	
14	1	Cassandra Kelly	New Zealand	14.21	
	1	Karen Nelson	Canada	DNF	
	1	Michelle Freeman	Jamaica	DNS	

=== Final ===
Wind: +1.8 m/s

Rank	Lane	Name	Nationality	Time	Notes
1st place, gold medalist(s)	1	Kay Morley	Wales	12.91	CR
2nd place, silver medalist(s)	5	Sally Gunnell	England	13.12	
3rd place, bronze medalist(s)	4	Lesley-Ann Skeete	England	13.31	
4	6	Jane Flemming	Australia	13.37	
5	3	Glynis Nunn-Cearns	Australia	13.47	
6	7	Jenny Laurendet	Australia	13.52	
7	8	Judith Robinson	Northern Ireland	13.55	
8	2	Helen Pirovano	New Zealand	13.61	
	9	Louise Fraser	England	DQ	
