= 1992 European Athletics Indoor Championships – Women's 60 metres hurdles =

The women's 60 metres hurdles event at the 1992 European Athletics Indoor Championships was held in Palasport di Genova on 1 March.

== Medalists ==
Gold	Silver	Bronze
Lyudmila Narozhilenko; Unified Team	Monique Ewanje-Epée; France	Yordanka Donkova; Bulgaria

== Results ==
=== Heats ===
First 4 from each heat (Q) and the next 4 fastest (q) qualified for the semifinals.

Rank	Heat	Name	Nationality	Time	Notes
1	3	Lyudmila Narozhilenko	Unified Team	7.90	Q
2	1	Anne Piquereau	France	8.09	Q
3	1	Julie Baumann	Switzerland	8.09	Q
4	2	Yordanka Donkova	Bulgaria	8.10	Q
5	3	Christine Hurtlin	France	8.12	Q
6	2	Kristin Patzwahl	Germany	8.18	Q
7	2	Jacqueline Agyepong	Great Britain	8.21	Q
8	3	Samantha Farquharson	Great Britain	8.25	Q
9	3	Brigita Bukovec	Slovenia	8.25	Q
10	1	Sylvia Dethiér	Belgium	8.26	Q
10	2	María José Mardomingo	Spain	8.26	Q
12	2	Caroline Delplancke	Belgium	8.27	q
13	2	Rita Schönenberger	Switzerland	8.29	q
14	1	Kay Brown	Great Britain	8.30	Q
15	1	Liliana Năstase	Romania	8.31	q
15	2	Monique Ewanje-Epée	France	8.31	q
17	2	Paraskevi Patoulidou	Greece	8.33	
18	3	Carla Tuzzi	Italy	8.40	
19	3	Marina Smirnova	Latvia	8.41	
20	1	Petra Hassinger	Germany	8.46	
21	1	Daniela Morandini	Italy	8.51	
22	1	Monica Grefstad	Norway	8.52	
	3	Gabi Roth	Germany	DNS	

=== Semifinals ===
First 4 from each semifinal qualified directly (Q) for the final.

Rank	Heat	Name	Nationality	Time	Notes
1	2	Lyudmila Narozhilenko	Unified Team	7.89	Q
2	2	Julie Baumann	Switzerland	8.04	Q
3	2	Monique Ewanje-Epée	France	8.04	Q
4	2	Christine Hurtlin	France	8.08	Q
5	1	Yordanka Donkova	Bulgaria	8.10	Q
6	1	Kristin Patzwahl	Germany	8.13	Q
7	1	Jacqueline Agyepong	Great Britain	8.14	Q
8	1	Anne Piquereau	France	8.14	Q
9	2	Kay Brown	Great Britain	8.18	
10	1	Brigita Bukovec	Slovenia	8.23	
11	1	Rita Schönenberger	Switzerland	8.25	
11	2	Sylvia Dethiér	Belgium	8.25	
13	2	Samantha Farquharson	Great Britain	8.27	
14	1	Caroline Delplancke	Belgium	8.31	
15	1	María José Mardomingo	Spain	8.32	
15	2	Liliana Năstase	Romania	8.32	

=== Final ===
Rank	Lane	Name	Nationality	Time	Notes
1st place, gold medalist(s)	6	Lyudmila Narozhilenko	Unified Team	7.82	
2nd place, silver medalist(s)	5	Monique Ewanje-Epée	France	7.99	
3rd place, bronze medalist(s)	8	Yordanka Donkova	Bulgaria	8.03	
4	4	Christine Hurtlin	France	8.08	
5	3	Julie Baumann	Switzerland	8.11	
6	1	Kristin Patzwahl	Germany	8.19	
7	7	Jacqueline Agyepong	Great Britain	8.25	
8	2	Anne Piquereau	France	8.35	
