= 1988 World Junior Championships in Athletics – Women's 100 metres hurdles =

The women's 100 metres hurdles event at the 1988 World Junior Championships in Athletics was held in Sudbury, Ontario, Canada, at Laurentian University Stadium on 29 and 30 July.

== Medalists ==
Gold	Aliuska López; Cuba
Silver	Birgit Wolf; West Germany
Bronze	Zhanna Gurbanova; Soviet Union

== Results ==
=== Final ===
30 July
Wind: -2.6 m/s

Rank	Name	Nationality	Time	Notes
1st place, gold medalist(s)	Aliuska López	Cuba	13.23	
2nd place, silver medalist(s)	Birgit Wolf	West Germany	13.51	
3rd place, bronze medalist(s)	Zhanna Gurbanova	Soviet Union	13.64	
4	Yuliya Filipova	Soviet Union	13.76	
5	Anna Leszczyńska	Poland	13.92	
6	Michaela Hübel	West Germany	14.15	
	Jacqui Agyepong	United Kingdom	DQ	
	Terry Robinson	United States	DNF	

=== Semifinals ===
30 July

==== Semifinal 1 ====
Wind: +1.5 m/s

Rank	Name	Nationality	Time	Notes
1	Aliuska López	Cuba	12.96	Q
2	Yuliya Filipova	Soviet Union	13.57	Q
3	Anna Leszczyńska	Poland	13.67	Q
4	Terry Robinson	United States	13.68	q
5	Michaela Hübel	West Germany	13.86	q
6	Brigita Bukovec	Yugoslavia	13.96	
7	Rita Rosseland	Norway	14.13	
8	Louise Fraser	United Kingdom	14.14	

==== Semifinal 2 ====
Wind: +3.8 m/s

Rank	Name	Nationality	Time	Notes
1	Birgit Wolf	West Germany	13.49 w	Q
2	Zhanna Gurbanova	Soviet Union	13.62 w	Q
3	Jacqui Agyepong	United Kingdom	13.86 w	Q
4	Wang Shu-Hua	Chinese Taipei	13.86 w	
5	Gillian Russell	Jamaica	13.95 w	
6	Lisa Wells	United States	14.08 w	
7	Val Beckles	Canada	14.61 w	
	Yanelis Valiente	Cuba	DNF	

=== Repechage Heat ===
29 July Wind: -0.8 m/s

Rank	Name	Nationality	Time	Notes
1	Louise Fraser	United Kingdom	14.22	q
	Monika Bauernfried	Austria	DNF	

=== Heats ===
29 July

==== Heat 1 ====
Wind: -1.3 m/s

Rank	Name	Nationality	Time	Notes
1	Zhanna Gurbanova	Soviet Union	13.77	Q
2	Anna Leszczyńska	Poland	13.89	Q
3	Terry Robinson	United States	13.93	Q
4	Val Beckles	Canada	13.97	q
5	Louise Fraser	United Kingdom	14.22	q
6	Michelle Deverell	Australia	14.43	
7	Filiz Türker	Turkey	14.50	
	Michelle Freeman	Jamaica	DQ	

==== Heat 2 ====
Wind: -0.9 m/s

Rank	Name	Nationality	Time	Notes
1	Birgit Wolf	West Germany	13.74	Q
2	Lisa Wells	United States	14.10	Q
3	Gillian Russell	Jamaica	14.19	Q
4	Monika Bauernfried	Austria	14.22	
5	Regina Gabarró	Spain	14.43	
6	Carolina Gutiérrez	Argentina	14.49	
7	Vanessa Jack	New Zealand	14.73	

==== Heat 3 ====
Wind: -1.8 m/s

Rank	Name	Nationality	Time	Notes
1	Aliuska López	Cuba	13.51	Q
2	Jacqui Agyepong	United Kingdom	13.72	Q
3	Michaela Hübel	West Germany	14.05	Q
4	Rita Rosseland	Norway	14.09	q
5	Brigita Bukovec	Yugoslavia	14.19	q
6	Chan Sau Ying	Hong Kong	15.09	
7	Clarice Kuhn	Brazil	29.55	

==== Heat 4 ====
Wind: -2.2 m/s

Rank	Name	Nationality	Time	Notes
1	Yuliya Filipova	Soviet Union	13.93	Q
2	Yanelis Valiente	Cuba	13.99	Q
3	Wang Shu-Hua	Chinese Taipei	14.24	Q
4	María José Mardomingo	Spain	14.52	
5	Karen Knight	Australia	14.71	
6	Andrea Little	Canada	14.86	
	Hope Obika	Nigeria	DNS	

== Participation ==
According to an unofficial count, 28 athletes from 19 countries participated in the event.

- Argentina (1)
- Australia (2)
- Austria (1)
- Brazil (1)
- Canada (2)
- Chinese Taipei (1)
- Cuba (2)
- Hong Kong (1)
- Jamaica (2)
- New Zealand (1)
- Norway (1)
- Poland (1)
- Soviet Union (2)
- Spain (2)
- Turkey (1)
- United Kingdom (2)
- United States (2)
- West Germany (2)
- Yugoslavia (1)
