= Athletics at the 1995 Summer Universiade – Women's 100 metres hurdles =

The women's 100 metres hurdles event at the 1995 Summer Universiade was held on 1–2 September at the Hakatanomori Athletic Stadium in Fukuoka, Japan.

== Medalists ==
Gold	Silver	Bronze
Nicole Ramalalanirina; Madagascar	Olena Ovcharova; Ukraine	Svetlana Laukhova; Russia

== Results ==
=== Heats ===
Qualification: First 2 of each heat (Q) and the next 2 fastest (q) qualified for the final.

Wind:
Heat 1: +0.2 m/s, Heat 2: +0.8 m/s, Heat 3: -0.5 m/s

Rank	Heat	Athlete	Nationality	Time	Notes
1	1	Nicole Ramalalanirina	Madagascar	12.92	Q
2	1	Olena Ovcharova	Ukraine	12.94	Q
3	2	Taiwo Aladefa	Nigeria	13.02	Q
4	3	Ime Akpan	Nigeria	13.15	Q
5	2	Doris Williams	United States	13.20	Q
6	1	Vida Nsiah	Ghana	13.28	q
7	2	Svetlana Laukhova	Russia	13.29	q
8	3	Monifa Taylor	United States	13.38	Q
9	2	Sharon Jaklofsky	Netherlands	13.39	
10	1	Aldona Fogiel	Poland	13.47	
11	1	Bettina Stähli	Switzerland	13.55	
12	1	Masae Matsuura	Japan	13.61	
13	3	Martina Stoop	Switzerland	13.68	
14	3	Isabelle Correa	France	13.72	
15	3	Patrina Allen	Jamaica	13.72	
16	3	Sonia Paquette	Canada	13.84	
17	1	Carmen Bezanilla	Chile	13.88	
18	2	Seema Kamal	Canada	13.91	
19	2	Hsu Hsiu-Ying	Chinese Taipei	13.92	
20	3	Chan Sau Ying	Hong Kong	13.96	
21	2	Tomomi Asada	Japan	14.07	
22	2	Sandra Barreiro	Portugal	14.30	
23	1	Rowena Welford	New Zealand	14.33	

=== Final ===
Wind: +0.6 m/s

Rank	Lane	Athlete	Nationality	Time	Notes
1st place, gold medalist(s)	6	Nicole Ramalalanirina	Madagascar	13.02	
2nd place, silver medalist(s)	4	Olena Ovcharova	Ukraine	13.07	
3rd place, bronze medalist(s)	7	Svetlana Laukhova	Russia	13.08	
4	5	Ime Akpan	Nigeria	13.11	
5	1	Doris Williams	United States	13.33	
6	2	Monifa Taylor	United States	13.61	
7	8	Vida Nsiah	Ghana	14.13	
	8	Taiwo Aladefa	Nigeria	DNF	
