= 1996 European Athletics Indoor Championships – Women's 60 metres hurdles =

The women's 60 metres hurdles event at the 1996 European Athletics Indoor Championships was held in Stockholm Globe Arena on 10 March.

== Medalists ==
Gold	Silver	Bronze
Patricia Girard-Leno; France	Brigita Bukovec; Slovenia	Monique Tourret; France

== Results ==
=== Heats ===
The winner of each heat (Q) and the next 3 fastest (q) qualified for the final.

Rank	Heat	Name	Nationality	Time	Notes
1	1	Brigita Bukovec	Slovenia	7.96	Q
2	2	Patricia Girard-Leno	France	8.06	Q
3	3	Monique Tourret	France	8.13	Q
4	1	Anne Piquereau	France	8.14	q
4	2	María José Mardomingo	Spain	8.14	q
6	3	Caren Jung	Germany	8.16	q
7	2	Birgit Wolf	Germany	8.21	
8	1	Carla Tuzzi	Italy	8.22	
9	3	Anna Leszczyńska	Poland	8.24	
10	2	Remigija Nazarovienė	Lithuania	8.30	
11	3	Kertu Tiitso	Estonia	8.69	
	1	Nadezhda Bodrova	Ukraine	DNS	
	2	Susan Smith	Ireland	DNS	

=== Final ===
Rank	Lane	Name	Nationality	Time	Notes
1st place, gold medalist(s)	4	Patricia Girard-Leno	France	7.89	
2nd place, silver medalist(s)	5	Brigita Bukovec	Slovenia	7.90	
3rd place, bronze medalist(s)	2	Monique Tourret	France	8.09	
4	2	María José Mardomingo	Spain	8.15	
5	1	Anne Piquereau	France	8.25	
6	6	Caren Jung	Germany	9.87	
