= 1990 World Junior Championships in Athletics – Women's 100 metres hurdles =

The women's 100 metres hurdles event at the 1990 World Junior Championships in Athletics was held in Plovdiv, Bulgaria, at Deveti Septemvri Stadium on 9 and 10 August.

== Medalists ==
Gold	Gillian Russell; Jamaica
Silver	Keri Maddox; United Kingdom
Bronze	Ilka Rönisch; East Germany

== Results ==
=== Final ===
9 August
Wind: +0.3 m/s

Rank	Name	Nationality	Time	Notes
1st place, gold medalist(s)	Gillian Russell	Jamaica	13.31	
2nd place, silver medalist(s)	Keri Maddox	United Kingdom	13.38	
3rd place, bronze medalist(s)	Ilka Rönisch	East Germany	13.41	
4	Oraidis Ramírez	Cuba	13.54	
5	Monifa Taylor	United States	13.58	
6	Natalya Shekhodanova	Soviet Union	13.71	
7	Yelena Alistratenko	Soviet Union	13.73	
8	Lauraine Cameron	United Kingdom	13.77	

=== Semifinals ===
10 August

==== Semifinal 1 ====
Wind: -0.9 m/s

Rank	Name	Nationality	Time	Notes
1	Gillian Russell	Jamaica	13.32	Q
2	Keri Maddox	United Kingdom	13.37	Q
3	Ilka Rönisch	East Germany	13.58	Q
4	Yelena Alistratenko	Soviet Union	13.75	Q
5	Anna Leszczyńska	Poland	13.78	
6	Taiwo Aladefa	Nigeria	14.05	
7	Teodora Luca	Romania	14.27	
8	Mary-Allison Williams	United States	19.15	

==== Semifinal 2 ====
Wind: -0.5 m/s

Rank	Name	Nationality	Time	Notes
1	Oraidis Ramírez	Cuba	13.64	Q
2	Lauraine Cameron	United Kingdom	13.68	Q
3	Natalya Shekhodanova	Soviet Union	13.73	Q
4	Monifa Taylor	United States	13.74	Q
5	Susan Smith	Ireland	13.97	
6	Sandra Barreiro	Portugal	14.11	
7	Monique Van Den Kieboom	Belgium	14.17	
8	Iina Pekkola	Finland	14.19	

=== Heats ===
9 August

==== Heat 1 ====
Wind: +0.6 m/s

Rank	Name	Nationality	Time	Notes
1	Natalya Shekhodanova	Soviet Union	13.73	Q
2	Lauraine Cameron	United Kingdom	13.79	Q
3	Anna Leszczyńska	Poland	13.87	Q
4	Sandra Barreiro	Portugal	13.97	Q
5	Taiwo Aladefa	Nigeria	14.04	q
6	Monique Van Den Kieboom	Belgium	14.07	q
7	Guðrún Arnardóttir	Iceland	14.30	

==== Heat 2 ====
Wind: +0.5 m/s

Rank	Name	Nationality	Time	Notes
1	Oraidis Ramírez	Cuba	13.62	Q
2	Ilka Rönisch	East Germany	13.65	Q
3	Monifa Taylor	United States	13.78	Q
4	Iina Pekkola	Finland	13.99	Q
5	Susan Smith	Ireland	14.07	q
6	Teodora Luca	Romania	14.10	q
7	Olivia Kohl	Belgium	14.54	
8	Michelle Openshaw	Peru	15.24	

==== Heat 3 ====
Wind: +2.4 m/s

Rank	Name	Nationality	Time	Notes
1	Gillian Russell	Jamaica	13.46 w	Q
2	Keri Maddox	United Kingdom	13.50 w	Q
3	Yelena Alistratenko	Soviet Union	13.93 w	Q
4	Mary-Allison Williams	United States	14.14 w	Q
5	Kim Seon-Jin	South Korea	14.17 w	
6	Marika Salminen	Finland	14.34 w	
7	Elke Wölfling	Austria	14.51 w	
8	Kym Burns	Australia	15.25 w	

== Participation ==
According to an unofficial count, 23 athletes from 18 countries participated in the event.

- Australia (1)
- Austria (1)
- Belgium (2)
- Cuba (1)
- East Germany (1)
- Finland (2)
- Iceland (1)
- Ireland (1)
- Jamaica (1)
- Nigeria (1)
- Peru (1)
- Poland (1)
- Portugal (1)
- Romania (1)
- South Korea (1)
- Soviet Union (2)
- United Kingdom (2)
- United States (2)
