= Monique Éwanjé-Épée =

French hurdler (born 1967)

Monique Éwanjé-Epée
Personal information
- Nationality: French
- Born: 11 July 1967 (age 59) Poitiers, France
- Height: 1.73 m (5 ft 8 in)
- Weight: 65 kg (143 lb)

Sport
- Country: France
- Sport: Athletics
- Events: 60 m hurdles and 100 m hurdles
Medal record
Women's athletics
Representing France
World Indoor Championships
Silver medal – second place	1991 Seville	60 m hurdles
European Championships
Gold medal – first place	1990 Split	100 m hurdles
European Indoor Championships
Silver medal – second place	1990 Glasgow	60 m hurdles
Silver medal – second place	1992 Genoa	60 m hurdles
Bronze medal – third place	1996 Stockholm	60 m hurdles
Summer Universiade
Gold medal – first place	1989 Duisburg	100 m hurdles
Jeux de la Francophonie
Gold medal – first place	1989 Rabat	100 m hurdles
European Junior Championships
Gold medal – first place	1985 Cottbus	100 m hurdles

Monique Éwanjé-Épée Lewin (née Éwanjé-Épée, formerly Tourret; born 11 July 1967) is a retired French track and field athlete who competed in the 60 m hurdles and 100 m hurdles, and is the co-holder (as of 2016) of the French national records for both events. She is the 1990 European Champion and the 1991 World Indoor silver medallist. She also represented France at the Olympic Games in 1988, 1992 and 1996.

== Career ==
Éwanjé-Épée was born in Poitiers, France. She won the 1985 European Junior Championships 100 metres hurdles title in 13.10 secs. In 1988, she reached the Olympic final in Seoul, finishing seventh. In 1989, she won the 100 metres hurdles titles at both the Jeux de la Francophonie and the Universiade. In March 1990, she won a silver medal in the 60 m hurdles at the European Indoor Championships in Glasgow, behind Ludmila Narozhilenko of the Soviet Union.

Éwanjé-Épée reached her peak in the 1990 outdoor season, improving her own French 100 m hurdles record to 12.56 on 29 June. This was the second fastest time in the world for 1990, with only Nataliya Grigoryeva of the Soviet Union going faster with 12.53. On 30 August, Ewanje-Épée won the European title in Split with 12.79. At the end of the 1990 season, both Track and Field News magazine and the Athletics International Annual, ranked Ewanje-Épée the number one 100 m hurdler on their world merit rankings, ahead of Grigoryeva. In the 1991 indoor season, she won a silver medal in the 60 m hurdles at the World Indoor Championships in Seville, narrowly losing out to Narozhilenko by two-hundredths of a second. Outdoors, she finished fourth in the 100 m hurdles final at the 1991 World Championships in Tokyo, behind Narozhilenko, Gail Devers and Grigoryeva.

Éwanjé-Èpée won a silver medal in the 60 m hurdles at the 1992 European Indoor Championships in Genoa, once again behind Narozhilenko and ahead of Yordanka Donkova. Outdoors, she competed at her second Olympics, where she was eliminated in the heats of the 100 m hurdles. Having missed the 1993 season through pregnancy, she returned in 1994 competing under her then married name of Monique Tourret, and went on to finish fourth in the 60 m hurdles final at the 1995 World Indoor Championships. In 1996, she won a bronze medal in the 60 m hurdles at the European Indoor Championships, before going on to compete at her third Olympic Games, where she was eliminated in the quarter-finals.

Éwanjé-Épée is still the holder of the French national outdoor record for the women's 100 m hurdles (12.56 sec), set on 29 June 1990 in Villeneuve d'Ascq, France. This record was equalled by Cindy Billaud in 2014. Her French national indoor record for the women's 60 m hurdles (7.82 sec), set on 23 February 1991 in Paris, also still stands. It was equalled on 7 March 2004 by Linda Ferga at the 2004 World Indoor Championships in Budapest.

== Personal life ==
Éwanjé-Épée is married to gospel singer Frederick Lewin, with whom she has a son, Joachim (born 2006). She was previously married to the French pole vaulter Christophe Tourret, with whom she has two daughters, Marylou (1993) and Olivia (1997). Her elder sister, Maryse Éwanjé-Épée, is the French record holder in the high jump and reached the Olympic high jump final in 1984 and 1988.

== Results in international competitions ==
Year	Competition	Venue	Position	Event	Notes
1985	European Junior Championships	Cottbus, East Germany	1st	100 m hurdles	13.10
1986	European Indoor Championships	Madrid, Spain	10th (sf)	60 m hurdles	8.06
1986	European Championships	Stuttgart, Germany	14th (sf)	100 m hurdles	13.29
1988	Olympic Games	Seoul, South Korea	7th	100 m hurdles	13.14
1989	European Indoor Championships	The Hague, Netherlands	5th	60 m hurdles	8.22
1989	World Indoor Championships	Budapest, Hungary	8th (h)	60 m hurdles	8.08
1989	Jeux de la Francophonie	Rabat, Morocco	1st	100 m hurdles	12.92
1989	Universiade	Duisburg, West Germany	1st	100 m hurdles	12.65 (GR, NR)
1990	European Indoor Championships	Glasgow, Scotland	2nd	60 m hurdles	7.84
1990	European Championships	Split, Yugoslavia	1st	100 m hurdles	12.79
1990	IAAF Grand Prix Final	Athens, Greece	3rd	100 m hurdles	12.86
1991	World Indoor Championships	Seville, Spain	2nd	60 m hurdles	7.90
1991	European Cup	Frankfurt, Germany	2nd	100 m hurdles	12.79
1991	World Championships	Tokyo, Japan	4th	100 m hurdles	12.84
1992	European Indoor Championships	Genoa, Italy	2nd	60 m hurdles	7.99
1992	Olympic Games	Barcelona, Spain	30th (h)	100 m hurdles	13.73
1994	Jeux de la Francophonie	Bondoufle, France	6th	100 m hurdles	13.61
1994	European Championships	Helsinki, Finland	18th (h)	100 m hurdles	13.29
1995	World Indoor Championships	Barcelona, Spain	4th	60 m hurdles	7.98
1995	European Cup	Villeneuve-d'Ascq, France	4th	100 m hurdles	12.92
1995	World Championships	Gothenburg, Sweden	17th (h)	100 m hurdles	13.13
1996	European Indoor Championships	Stockholm, Sweden	3rd	60 m hurdles	8.09
1996	Olympic Games	Atlanta, United States	28th (qf)	100 m hurdles	13.17
(#) Indicates overall position in qualifying heats (h) quarterfinals (qf) or semifinals (sf)
