= 1986 World Junior Championships in Athletics – Women's 100 metres hurdles =

The women's 100 metres hurdles event at the 1986 World Junior Championships in Athletics was held in Athens, Greece, at Olympic Stadium on 17 and 18 July.

== Medalists ==
Gold	Heike Tillack; East Germany
Silver	Aliuska López; Cuba
Bronze	Tanya Davis; United States

== Results ==
=== Final ===
18 July
Wind: -0.8 m/s

Rank	Name	Nationality	Time	Notes
1st place, gold medalist(s)	Heike Tillack	East Germany	13.10	
2nd place, silver medalist(s)	Aliuska López	Cuba	13.14	
3rd place, bronze medalist(s)	Tanya Davis	United States	13.46	
4	Birgit Wolf	West Germany	13.52	
5	Antonella Bellutti	Italy	13.62	
6	Lenuta Birzu	Romania	13.96	
7	Wang Shu-Hua	Chinese Taipei	14.03	
8	Małgorzata Zep	Poland	14.35	

=== Semifinals ===
18 July

==== Semifinal 1 ====
Wind: -0.3 m/s

Rank	Name	Nationality	Time	Notes
1	Heike Tillack	East Germany	13.52	Q
2	Aliuska López	Cuba	13.52	Q
3	Tanya Davis	United States	13.80	Q
4	Małgorzata Zep	Poland	14.10	Q
5	Anna Barinova	Soviet Union	14.11	
6	Svetlana Trichkova	Bulgaria	14.16	
7	María José Mardomingo	Spain	14.92	
	Laura Biagi	Italy	DNS	

==== Semifinal 2 ====
Wind: +1.1 m/s

Rank	Name	Nationality	Time	Notes
1	Antonella Bellutti	Italy	13.73	Q
2	Lenuta Birzu	Romania	13.94	Q
3	Birgit Wolf	West Germany	14.01	Q
4	Wang Shu-Hua	Chinese Taipei	14.11	Q
5	Niurka Montalvo	Cuba	14.28	
6	Yolanda Johnson	United States	14.42	
7	Karin Andersson	Sweden	14.47	
	Nadezhda Chistyakova	Soviet Union	DNS	

=== Heats ===
17 July

==== Heat 1 ====
Wind: +0.4 m/s

Rank	Name	Nationality	Time	Notes
1	Aliuska López	Cuba	13.60	Q
2	Birgit Wolf	West Germany	13.68	Q
3	Małgorzata Zep	Poland	14.12	Q
4	Karin Andersson	Sweden	14.26	Q
5	Gordana Čotrić	Yugoslavia	14.33	
6	Hope Obika	Nigeria	14.51	
7	Ana María Núñez	Uruguay	15.57	

==== Heat 2 ====
Wind: -1.9 m/s

Rank	Name	Nationality	Time	Notes
1	Heike Tillack	East Germany	13.61	Q
2	Anna Barinova	Soviet Union	14.01	Q
3	Lenuta Birzu	Romania	14.11	Q
4	Niurka Montalvo	Cuba	14.60	Q
5	Michaela Hynek	Austria	14.95	
6	Maria Luna	Brazil	15.15	
7	Sandra Govinden	Mauritius	16.11	

==== Heat 3 ====
Wind: +1.3 m/s

Rank	Name	Nationality	Time	Notes
1	Yolanda Johnson	United States	13.59	Q
2	Laura Biagi	Italy	13.97	Q
3	Nadezhda Chistyakova	Soviet Union	14.15	Q
4	Svetlana Trichkova	Bulgaria	14.16	Q
5	Gabriele Miklautsch	Austria	14.24	
6	Shannon Crossfield	Canada	14.62	
7	Theofaní Papadopoúlou	Greece	15.28	

==== Heat 4 ====
Wind: +0.3 m/s

Rank	Name	Nationality	Time	Notes
1	Antonella Bellutti	Italy	13.62	Q
2	Wang Shu-Hua	Chinese Taipei	14.04	Q
3	Tanya Davis	United States	14.20	Q
4	María José Mardomingo	Spain	14.38	Q
5	Andrea Bacchiochi	Canada	14.66	
6	Branka Jošić	Yugoslavia	14.72	
7	Joyce Meléndez	Puerto Rico	15.29	
8	Jacinta Kimwetich	Kenya	15.95	

== Participation ==
According to an unofficial count, 29 athletes from 22 countries participated in the event.

- Austria (2)
- Brazil (1)
- Bulgaria (1)
- Canada (2)
- Chinese Taipei (1)
- Cuba (2)
- East Germany (1)
- Greece (1)
- Italy (2)
- Kenya (1)
- Mauritius (1)
- Nigeria (1)
- Poland (1)
- Puerto Rico (1)
- Romania (1)
- Soviet Union (2)
- Spain (1)
- Sweden (1)
- United States (2)
- Uruguay (1)
- West Germany (1)
- Yugoslavia (2)
