= 1998 European Athletics Indoor Championships – Women's 60 metres hurdles =

The women's 60 metres hurdles event at the 1998 European Athletics Indoor Championships was held on 1 March.

== Medalists ==
| Gold | Silver | Bronze |
|---|---|---|
| Patricia Girard; France | Svetlana Laukhova; Russia | Diane Allahgreen; Great Britain |

== Results ==
=== Heats ===
First 3 from each heat (Q) and the next 2 fastest (q) qualified for the final.

| Rank | Heat | Name | Nationality | Time | Notes |
|---|---|---|---|---|---|
| 1 | 2 | Svetlana Laukhova | Russia | 7.95 | Q |
| 2 | 2 | Patricia Girard | France | 7.95 | Q |
| 3 | 1 | Brigita Bukovec | Slovenia | 7.97 | Q |
| 4 | 1 | Heike Blaßneck | Germany | 8.05 | Q |
| 5 | 1 | Diane Allahgreen | Great Britain | 8.10 | Q |
| 6 | 1 | Anna Leszczyńska | Poland | 8.12 | q |
| 6 | 2 | Caren Sonn | Germany | 8.12 | Q |
| 8 | 1 | María José Mardomingo | Spain | 8.12 | q |
| 9 | 1 | Irina Korotya | Russia | 8.19 | |
| 10 | 2 | Kertu Tiitso | Estonia | 8.24 | NR |
| 11 | 2 | Anita Trumpe | Latvia | 8.27 | |
| 12 | 2 | Regina Ahlke | Germany | 8.28 | |
| 13 | 2 | Sandra Turpin | Portugal | 8.36 | |
| 14 | 1 | Marilia Gregoriou | Cyprus | 8.48 | |

=== Final ===
| Rank | Name | Nationality | Time | Notes |
|---|---|---|---|---|
| 1st place, gold medalist(s) | Patricia Girard | France | 7.85 | |
| 2nd place, silver medalist(s) | Svetlana Laukhova | Russia | 8.01 | |
| 3rd place, bronze medalist(s) | Diane Allahgreen | Great Britain | 8.02 | |
| 4 | Anna Leszczyńska | Poland | 8.15 | |
| 5 | María José Mardomingo | Spain | 8.16 | |
| 6 | Caren Sonn | Germany | 8.24 | |
| 7 | Brigita Bukovec | Slovenia | 8.34 | |
| 8 | Heike Blaßneck | Germany | 8.95 | |
