= Athletics at the 1986 Commonwealth Games – Women's 100 metres hurdles =

Women's 100 metres hurdles at the Commonwealth Games

The women's 100 metres hurdles event at the 1986 Commonwealth Games was held on 31 July and 1 August at the Meadowbank Stadium in Edinburgh.

== Medalists ==
Gold	Silver	Bronze
Sally Gunnell; England	Wendy Jeal; England	Glynis Cearns; Australia

== Results ==
=== Heats ===
Qualification: First 3 of each heat (Q) and the next 2 fastest (q) qualified for the final.

Wind:
Heat 1: +1.2 m/s, Heat 2: +2.3 m/s

Rank	Heat	Name	Nationality	Time	Notes
1	2	Sally Gunnell	England	13.12	Q
2	2	Glynis Nunn	Australia	13.31	Q
3	2	Julie Rocheleau	Canada	13.32	Q
4	1	Wendy Jeal	England	13.33	Q
5	1	Jane Flemming	Australia	13.45	Q
6	1	Judith Rodgers	Northern Ireland	13.48	Q
7	1	Lesley-Ann Skeete	England	13.51	q
8	2	Kay Morley	Wales	13.52	q
9	2	Jenny Laurendet	Australia	13.56	
10	2	Ann Girvan	Scotland	13.60	
11	1	Lyn Stock	New Zealand	13.67	
12	1	Faye Blackwood	Canada	13.71	
13	2	Yolande Jones	Canada	13.79	
14	1	Pat Rollo	Scotland	14.00	
15	2	Terry Genge	New Zealand	14.06	

=== Final ===
Wind: -1.1 m/s

Rank	Lane	Name	Nationality	Time	Notes
1st place, gold medalist(s)	3	Sally Gunnell	England	13.29	
2nd place, silver medalist(s)	5	Wendy Jeal	England	13.41	
3rd place, bronze medalist(s)	4	Glynis Nunn	Australia	13.44	
4	6	Julie Rocheleau	Canada	13.46	
5	8	Lesley-Ann Skeete	England	13.66	
6	2	Jane Flemming	Australia	13.69	
7	1	Kay Morley	Wales	13.83	
	7	Judith Rodgers	Northern Ireland	DNF	
