= Athletics at the 1999 Summer Universiade – Women's 100 metres hurdles =

The women's 100 metres hurdles event at the 1999 Summer Universiade was held at the Estadio Son Moix in Palma de Mallorca, Spain on 10 and 11 July.

== Medalists ==
Gold	Silver	Bronze
Andria King; United States	Yolanda McCray; United States	Diane Allahgreen; Great Britain

== Results ==
=== Heats ===
Wind:
Heat 1: -2.3 m/s, Heat 2: -0.7 m/s, Heat 3: -1.4 m/s, Heat 4: -0.2 m/s

Rank	Heat	Athlete	Nationality	Time	Notes
1	4	Andria King	United States	13.06	Q
2	4	Diane Allahgreen	Great Britain	13.09	Q
3	4	Maurren Maggi	Brazil	13.10	Q
4	2	Kirsten Bolm	Germany	13.23	Q
5	1	Yolanda McCray	United States	13.24	Q
6	1	Yahumara Neyra	Cuba	13.25	Q
7	1	Zita Bálint	Hungary	13.33	Q
8	3	Heike Blaßneck	Germany	13.34	Q
9	1	Olena Krasovska	Ukraine	13.39	q
10	2	Sonia Paquette	Canada	13.49	Q
11	3	Eva Miklos	Romania	13.54	Q
12	3	Natacha Casy	France	13.62	Q
13	2	Erica Niculae	Romania	13.64	Q
14	4	Tonia Tabaki	Greece	13.65	q
15	2	Nadine Grouwels	Belgium	13.74	q
16	3	Adri Vlok	South Africa	13.77	q
17	4	Martina Stoop	Switzerland	13.84	
18	2	Cora Olivero	Argentina	14.01	
19	4	Katka Jankovic	Slovenia	14.17	
20	1	Maria-Joëlle Conjungo	Central African Republic	14.31	
21	1	Joanna Buciarska	Denmark	14.32	
22	1	Noraseela Mohd Khalid	Malaysia	14.80	
23	3	Anita Sutherland	New Zealand	14.96	
24	2	Inicia Coelho da Fonseca	São Tomé and Príncipe	15.63	
25	3	Morzina Musammat	Bangladesh	19.95	

=== Semifinals ===
Wind:
Heat 1: -1.4 m/s, Heat 2: -3.1 m/s

Rank	Heat	Athlete	Nationality	Time	Notes
1	1	Yolanda McCray	United States	13.07	Q
2	1	Zita Bálint	Hungary	13.24	Q
3	1	Kirsten Bolm	Germany	13.24	Q
4	1	Yahumara Neyra	Cuba	13.24	Q
5	2	Diane Allahgreen	Great Britain	13.31	Q
6	2	Andria King	United States	13.37	Q
7	2	Olena Krasovska	Ukraine	13.45	Q
8	2	Heike Blaßneck	Germany	13.49	Q
9	1	Sonia Paquette	Canada	13.51	
10	2	Maurren Maggi	Brazil	13.52	
11	1	Erica Niculae	Romania	13.60	
12	2	Natacha Casy	France	13.67	
13	1	Tonia Tabaki	Greece	13.73	
14	1	Nadine Grouwels	Belgium	13.73	
15	2	Eva Miklos	Romania	13.81	
16	2	Adri Vlok	South Africa	13.85	

=== Final ===
Wind: -2.8 m/s

Rank	Athlete	Nationality	Time	Notes
1st place, gold medalist(s)	Andria King	United States	13.04	
2nd place, silver medalist(s)	Yolanda McCray	United States	13.08	
3rd place, bronze medalist(s)	Diane Allahgreen	Great Britain	13.17	
4	Olena Krasovska	Ukraine	13.20	PB
5	Kirsten Bolm	Germany	13.21	
6	Yahumara Neyra	Cuba	13.30	
7	Zita Bálint	Hungary	13.45	
8	Heike Blaßneck	Germany	13.46	
