= Athletics at the 1991 Summer Universiade – Women's 100 metres hurdles =

The women's 100 metres hurdles event at the 1991 Summer Universiade was held at the Don Valley Stadium in Sheffield on 21 July 1991.

== Medalists ==
Gold	Silver	Bronze
Marina Azyabina; Soviet Union	Mary Cobb; United States	Keri Maddox; Great Britain

== Results ==
=== Heats ===
Wind:
Heat 1: +1.3 m/s, Heat 2: +1.6 m/s, Heat 3: -0.7 m/s

Rank	Heat	Athlete	Nationality	Time	Notes
1	2	Mary Cobb	United States	13.07	Q
2	3	Marina Azyabina	Soviet Union	13.19	Q
3	1	Yolanda Johnson	United States	13.48	Q
3	3	Keri Maddox	Great Britain	13.48	Q
5	2	Sam Baker	Great Britain	13.51	Q
6	1	Ime Akpan	Nigeria	13.58	Q
7	2	Amona-Nicola Schneeweis	Germany	13.59	q
8	3	Wang Shu-hua	Chinese Taipei	13.69	q
9	1	Ulrike Beierl	Austria	13.73	
10	2	Lena Solli	Norway	13.83	
11	3	Mosun Adesina	Nigeria	14.02	
12	2	Mónica Ezpeleta	Spain	14.05	
13	3	Filiz Türker	Turkey	14.58	
	2	Elisabeta Anghel	Romania	DNF	

=== Final ===
Wind: +1.6 m/s

Rank	Athlete	Nationality	Time	Notes
1st place, gold medalist(s)	Marina Azyabina	Soviet Union	12.95	
2nd place, silver medalist(s)	Mary Cobb	United States	13.19	
3rd place, bronze medalist(s)	Keri Maddox	Great Britain	13.32	PB
4	Yolanda Johnson	United States	13.36	
5	Sam Baker	Great Britain	13.62	
6	Wang Shu-hua	Chinese Taipei	13.64	
7	Amona-Nicola Schneeweis	Germany	13.65	
8	Ime Akpan	Nigeria	13.74	
