= 1992 UK Athletics Championships =

- Dates: 6 & 7 June 1992
- Host city: Sheffield, England
- Venue: Sheffield Hallam UCA Stadium
- Level: Senior
- Type: Outdoor

The 1992 UK Athletics Championships, sponsored by Pearl Assurance, was the national championship in outdoor track and field for the United Kingdom held at Sheffield Hallam UCA Stadium, Sheffield. It was the only time the city hosted the championships. The men's and women's racewalking events were dropped from the programme for this edition.

It was the sixteenth edition of the competition limited to British athletes only, launched as an alternative to the AAA Championships, which was open to foreign competitors. However, because the calibre of national competition remained greater at the AAA event, the UK Championships this year were not considered the principal national championship event by some statisticians, such as the National Union of Track Statisticians (NUTS). Many of the athletes below also competed at the 1992 AAA Championships.

== Summary ==
The women's hammer throw was also not contested after featured for the first time in 1991.

Hammer thrower Paul Head and discus thrower Jackie McKernan each won their fourth straight UK title. Linford Christie (100 m) and Paul Edwards (shot put) made it three consecutive wins. Liz McColgan repeated her victory in the 3000 m. Marcus Adam, the 200 m winner, was the only champion to reach the podium in two events, having also finished third in the 100 m.

The main international track and field competition for the United Kingdom that year was the Olympic Games. The UK 100 m champion Linford Christie took Olympic gold in that event in Barcelona and the UK men's 400 m hurdles champion Kriss Akabusi took an Olympic bronze. Akabusi and the top three in the UK 400 m (Roger Black, Mark Richardson and David Grindley) all shared in a relay Olympic bronze, as did UK women's champions Phylis Smith and Sandra Douglas.

== Medals ==
=== Men ===
Event	Gold		Silver		Bronze	
100m	Linford Christie	10.43	Jason Livingston	10.50	Marcus Adam	10.63
200m	Marcus Adam	20.75	Darren Campbell	21.19	Tony Jarrett	21.29
400m	Roger Black	44.84	Mark Richardson	45.59	David Grindley	45.90
800m	Curtis Robb	1:46.95	Craig Winrow	1:47.83	(Scotland) Gary Brown	1:47.85
1,500m	Steve Crabb	3:46.81	Paul Larkins	3:47.07	Tony Morrell	3:47.47
3,000m	John Nuttall	7:58.69	Keith Cullen	8:00.87	Alan Johnson	8:04.99
5,000m	Ian Robinson	14:03.93	Neil Rimmer	14:05.57	Dave Buzza	14:07.04
110m hurdles	(Wales) Colin Jackson	13.43	David Nelson	13.80	Hughie Teape	13.93
400m hurdles	Kriss Akabusi	49.00	Max Robertson	50.13	Greg Dunson	50.88
3000m steeplechase	Colin Walker	8:32.66	Tom Buckner	8:36.95	Dave Lee	8:37.59
high jump	Brendan Reilly	2.30 m	Steve Smith	2.20 m	(Scotland) Geoff Parsons	2.20 m
pole vault	Mike Edwards	5.30 m	Ian Tullett	5.30 m	Andy Ashurst	5.10 m
long jump	Stewart Faulkner	7.86 m	Barrington Williams	7.74 m	Fred Salle	7.66 m w
triple jump	Jonathan Edwards	16.51 m	Tosi Fasinro	16.47 m	Julian Golley	16.24 m w
shot put	(Wales) Paul Edwards	18.77 m	(Scotland) Steve Whyte	17.72 m	(Wales) Shaun Pickering	17.12 m
discus throw	Abi Ekoku	56.42 m	Glen Smith	56.40 m	Kevin Brown	55.52 m
hammer throw	Paul Head	71.06 m	Jason Byrne	68.66 m	Mick Jones	68.52 m
javelin throw	Mick Hill	84.38 m	Roald Bradstock	81.16 m	Colin Mackenzie	76.66 m

=== Women ===
Event	Gold		Silver		Bronze	
100m	Marcia Richardson	11.68	(Wales) Sallyanne Short	11.69	(Scotland) Aileen McGillivary	11.70
200m	Phylis Smith	23.46	Katharine Merry	23.51	(Wales) Sallyanne Short	23.53
400m	Sandra Douglas	52.73	Lorraine Hanson	53.41	(Scotland) Gillian McIntyre	53.76
800m	Lynne Robinson	2:04.47	Lorraine Baker	2:04.52	Teena Colebrook	2:05.04
1,500m	Bev Nicholson	4:13.16	(Wales) Kirsty Wade	4:13.70	Lisa York	4:14.23
3,000m	(Scotland) Liz McColgan	8:56.01	Lisa York	9:03.94	(Scotland) Laura Adam	9:11.93
100m hurdles	(Wales) Kay Morley-Brown	13.59	Lesley-Ann Skeete	13.67	Jacqui Agyepong	13.68
400m hurdles	Gowry Retchakan	55.42	Louise Fraser	56.26	Jacqui Parker	56.99
high jump	Debbie Marti	1.89 m	Kerry Roberts	1.86 m	Lea Haggett	1.83 m
long jump	Oluyinka Idowu	6.66 m	Fiona May	6.61 m w	Mary Berkeley	6.40 m w
triple jump	Rachel Kirby	13.11 m w	Evette Finikin	12.93 m	Ashia Hansen	12.92 m
shot put	Myrtle Augee	17.84 m	Yvonne Hanson-Nortey	16.10 m	Maggie Lynes	15.69 m
discus throw	(Northern Ireland) Jackie McKernan	55.44 m	Tracy Axten	50.06 m	Sharon Andrews	49.60 m
javelin throw	Mandy Liverton	57.22 m	Shelley Holroyd	56.32 m	Caroline White	53.50 m
