= Nataliya Kolovanova =

Soviet hurdler

Personal information
- Nationality: Soviet
- Born: 1 August 1964 (age 62)

Sport
- Sport: Track and field
- Event: 100 metres hurdles

Nataliya Kolovanova (born 1 August 1964) is a Soviet-Ukrainian hurdler. She competed in the women's 100 metres hurdles at the 1992 Summer Olympics, representing the Unified Team.
