= Lidiya Yurkova =

Belarusian hurdler

Personal information
- Born: January 15, 1967 (age 59) Mogilev, Byelorussian SSR, USSR
- Height: 1.68 m (5 ft 6 in)
- Weight: 60 kg (132 lb)

Sport
- Sport: Track and field
- Events: 60 m hurdles, 100 m hurdles
Medal record
Women's athletics
Representing Soviet Union
European Championships
Bronze medal – third place	1990 Split	100 m hurdles
Summer Universiade
Silver medal – second place	1989 Duisburg	100 m hurdles

Lidiya Vitalyevna Yurkova (Cyrillic: Лидия Витальевна Юркова; née Okolo-Kulak, born 15 January 1967) is a retired Belarusian athlete who specialised in the sprint hurdles. She competed at the 1996 Summer Olympics as well as two indoor and one outdoor World Championships. In addition she won the bronze medal at the 1990 European Championships.

Her personal bests are 12.66 seconds in the 100 metres hurdles (Kiev 1990) and 7.86 seconds in the 60 metres hurdles (Chelyabinsk 1990).

== Competition record ==
Year	Competition	Venue	Position	Event	Notes
Representing the Soviet Union
1985	European Junior Championships	Cottbus, East Germany	3rd	100 m hurdles	13.30
1985	European Junior Championships	Cottbus, East Germany	2nd	4 × 100 m relay	44.49
1987	Universiade	Zagreb, Yugoslavia	7th	100 m hurdles	13.21
1989	Universiade	Duisburg, West Germany	2nd	100 m hurdles	12.73
1990	Goodwill Games	Seattle, United States	4th	100 m hurdles	12.92
1990	European Championships	Split, Yugoslavia	3rd	100 m hurdles	12.92
1990	Grand Prix Final	Athens, Greece	2nd	100 m hurdles	12.76
1991	World Indoor Championships	Seville, Spain	4th	60 m hurdles	8.03
Representing Belarus
1994	European Championships	Helsinki, Finland	17th (h)	100 m hurdles	13.25
1995	World Championships	Gothenburg, Sweden	11th (sf)	100 m hurdles	12.95
1996	Olympic Games	Atlanta, United States	24th (qf)	100 m hurdles	13.07
1997	World Indoor Championships	Paris, France	10th (sf)	60 m hurdles	8.17
