= María José Mardomingo =

Spanish hurdler

Personal information
- Born: 27 January 1969 (age 57) Madrid, Spain

Sport
- Sport: Track and field
Medal record
Representing Spain
Mediterranean Games
Bronze medal – third place	1991 Athens	100 m hurdles

María José Mardomingo Landaburu (born 27 January 1969) is a retired Spanish athlete who specialised in the 100 metres hurdles. She represented her country at the 1996 Summer Olympics, reaching the semifinals, as well as four outdoor and three indoor World Championships.

She has personal bests of 12.89 seconds in the 100 metres hurdles (Atlanta 1996) and 8.08 seconds in the 60 metres hurdles (Madrid 1996).

== Competition record ==
Year	Competition	Venue	Position	Event	Notes
Representing Spain
1986	European Indoor Championships	Madrid, Spain	17th (h)	60 m hurdles	8.77
1986	World Junior Championships	Athens, Greece	14th (sf)	100 m hurdles	14.92 (wind: -0.3 m/s)
1987	European Junior Championships	Birmingham, United Kingdom	15th (h)	100 m hurdles	16.27
1988	World Junior Championships	Sudbury, Canada	22nd (h)	100 m hurdles	14.52 (wind: -2.2 m/s)
1989	Universiade	Duisburg, West Germany	(h)	100 m hurdles	13.42
1989	World Cup	Barcelona, Spain	7th	100 m hurdles	13.76
1990	European Championships	Split, Yugoslavia	15th (sf)	100 m hurdles	13.40 (wind: +1.1 m/s)
1990	Ibero-American Championships	Manaus, Brazil	1st	100 m hurdles	13.59 (wind: -1.5 m/s)
1991	World Indoor Championships	Seville, Spain	15th (sf)	60 m hurdles	8.28
1991	Mediterranean Games	Athens, Greece	3rd	100 m hurdles	13.34
1991	World Championships	Tokyo, Japan	13th (sf)	100 m hurdles	13.19
1992	European Indoor Championships	Genoa, Italy	15th (sf)	60 m hurdles	8.32
1992	Ibero-American Championships	Seville, Spain	3rd	100 m hurdles	13.71 (wind: -1.1 m/s)
1992	Olympic Games	Barcelona, Spain	29th (h)	100 m hurdles	13.58
1993	World Indoor Championships	Toronto, Canada	6th	60 m hurdles	8.18
1993	Mediterranean Games	Narbonne, France	5th	100 m hurdles	13.52
1993	World Championships	Stuttgart, Germany	25th (h)	100 m hurdles	13.41
1994	European Championships	Helsinki, Finland	14th (sf)	100 m hurdles	13.35 (wind: -1.9 m/s)
1995	World Championships	Gothenburg, Sweden	22nd (h)	100 m hurdles	13.31
1996	European Indoor Championships	Stockholm, Sweden	4th	60 m hurdles	8.15
1996	Olympic Games	Atlanta, United States	11th (sf)	100 m hurdles	12.89
1997	World Championships	Athens, Greece	30th (h)	100 m hurdles	13.42
1998	European Indoor Championships	Valencia, Spain	5th	60 m hurdles	8.16
1998	Ibero-American Championships	Lisbon, Portugal	1st	100 m hurdles	13.27
1998	European Championships	Budapest, Hungary	18th (h)	100 m hurdles	13.66
1999	World Indoor Championships	Maebashi, Japan	14th (h)	60 m hurdles	8.17
2000	European Indoor Championships	Ghent, Belgium	10th (h)	60 m hurdles	8.24
