= Athletics at the 1989 Summer Universiade – Women's 100 metres hurdles =

The women's 100 metres hurdles event at the 1989 Summer Universiade was held at the Wedaustadion in Duisburg on 27 and 28 August 1989.

== Medalists ==
Gold	Silver	Bronze
Monique Ewanjé-Épée; France	Lidiya Okolo-Kulak; Soviet Union	Claudia Zaczkiewicz; West Germany

== Results ==
=== Heats ===
Wind:
Heat 1: +1.4 m/s, Heat 2: +1.1 m/s, Heat 3: +1.9 m/s

Rank	Heat	Athlete	Nationality	Time	Notes
1	1	Monique Ewanjé-Épée	France	12.79	Q
2	3	Lynda Tolbert	United States	12.86	Q
3	3	Odalys Adams	Cuba	12.87	Q
4	2	Lidiya Okolo-Kulak	Soviet Union	12.91	Q
5	3	Claudia Zaczkiewicz	West Germany	12.92	q
6	1	Eva Sokolova	Soviet Union	12.93	Q
7	2	Aliuska López	Cuba	12.95	Q
8	2	Canzetta Young	United States	13.13	q
9	3	Christine Hurtlin	France	13.20	
10	2	Sabine Seitl	Austria	13.30	
11	1	Ulrike Kleindl	Austria	13.36	
12	1	María José Mardomingo	Spain	13.42	NR
13	1	Carla Tuzzi	Italy	13.42	
14	2	Caren Jung	West Germany	13.50	
15	2	Ana Barrenechea	Spain	13.50	
16	1	Xiao Zifang	China	13.60	
17	2	Karen Nelson	Canada	13.68	
18	3	Helena Fernström	Sweden	13.72	
19	2	Hope Obika	Nigeria	13.80	
20	3	Emília Tavares	Portugal	13.83	
21	3	Mosun Adesina	Nigeria	14.09	

=== Final ===
Wind: +1.5 m/s

Rank	Athlete	Nationality	Time	Notes
1st place, gold medalist(s)	Monique Ewanjé-Épée	France	12.65	GR, NR
2nd place, silver medalist(s)	Lidiya Okolo-Kulak	Soviet Union	12.73	
3rd place, bronze medalist(s)	Claudia Zaczkiewicz	West Germany	12.78	
4	Aliuska López	Cuba	12.87	
5	Eva Sokolova	Soviet Union	12.93	
6	Lynda Tolbert	United States	12.95	
7	Odalys Adams	Cuba	12.95	
8	Canzetta Young	United States	13.27	
