= Dawn Bowles =

American hurdler (born 1968)

Personal information
- Born: November 12, 1968 (age 57) Neptune Township, New Jersey, United States
- Education: Louisiana State University

Sport
- Country: United States
- Sport: Track and field
- Event: 100 m hurdles
Medal record
Representing United States
Summer Universiade
Gold medal – first place	1993 Buffalo	100m hurdles

Dawn Bowles-Fitch (born November 12, 1968) is a retired American track and field athlete who specialized in the 100 meters hurdles. She represented her country at three outdoor and one indoor World Championships. In addition she won the gold at the 1993 Summer Universiade. Later in life she worked as the head coach for Neptune High School's track and field team.

Her personal bests are 12.84 seconds in the 100 meters hurdles (+0.6 m/s, Stuttgart 1993) and 7.95 seconds in the 60 meters hurdles (Atlanta 1997).

== Competition record ==
Year	Competition	Venue	Position	Event	Notes
Representing the United States
1991	Pan American Games	Havana, Cuba	4th	100 m hurdles	13.24
1991	World Championships	Tokyo, Japan	22nd (h)	100 m hurdles	13.41
1993	World Indoor Championships	Toronto, Canada	9th (sf)	60 m hurdles	8.23
1993	Universiade	Buffalo, United States	1st	100 m hurdles	13.16
1993	World Championships	Stuttgart, Germany	6th	100 m hurdles	12.90
1997	World Championships	Athens, Greece	20th (h)	100 m hurdles	13.11
