= Athletics at the 1995 Pan American Games – Women's 100 metres hurdles =

Women's 100 metres hurdles at the Pan American Games

The women's 100 metres hurdles event at the 1995 Pan American Games was held at the Estadio Atletico "Justo Roman" on 19 and 21 March.

== Medalists ==
Gold	Silver	Bronze
Aliuska López; Cuba	Donalda Duprey; Canada	Odalys Adams; Cuba

== Results ==
=== Heats ===
Wind:
Heat 1: -1.6 m/s, Heat 2: -0.8 m/s

Rank	Heat	Name	Nationality	Time	Notes
1	1	Aliuska López	Cuba	13.23	Q
2	2	Allison Williams	United States	13.52	Q
3	2	Donalda Duprey	Canada	13.57	Q
4	1	Lesley Tashlin	Canada	13.62	Q
5	1	Joyce Meléndez	Puerto Rico	13.67	Q
6	2	Odalys Adams	Cuba	13.75	Q
7	2	Carmen Bezanilla	Chile	13.91	q
8	1	Alejandra Martínez	Chile	14.15	q
	1	Verónica Depaoli	Argentina	DNF	
	2	Claudia Casals	Argentina	DNF	
	1	Lynda Goode	United States	DNS	

=== Final ===
Wind: +2.1 m/s

Rank	Lane	Name	Nationality	Time	Notes
1st place, gold medalist(s)	4	Aliuska López	Cuba	12.68	
2nd place, silver medalist(s)	3	Donalda Duprey	Canada	13.16	
3rd place, bronze medalist(s)	7	Odalys Adams	Cuba	13.17	
4	5	Allison Williams	United States	13.30	
5	8	Carmen Bezanilla	Chile	13.45	
6	6	Lesley Tashlin	Canada	13.45	
7	1	Joyce Meléndez	Puerto Rico	13.77	
8	2	Alejandra Martínez	Chile	14.09	
