= Athletics at the 1999 Pan American Games – Women's 100 metres hurdles =

Women's 100 metres hurdles at the Pan American Games

The women's 100 metres hurdles event at the 1999 Pan American Games was held on July 30.

== Results ==
Wind: +1.2 m/s

Rank	Name	Nationality	Time	Notes
1st place, gold medalist(s)	Aliuska López	Cuba	12.76	GR
2nd place, silver medalist(s)	Maurren Maggi	Brazil	12.86	
3rd place, bronze medalist(s)	Miesha McKelvy	United States	12.91	
4	Gillian Russell	Jamaica	13.13	
5	Lesley Tashlin	Canada	13.13	
6	Yahumara Neyra	Cuba	13.17	
7	Andria King	United States	13.28	
8	Verónica De Paoli	Argentina	13.28	
