= 1998 European Athletics Championships – Women's 100 metres hurdles =

Women's 100 metres hurdles at the European Athletics Championships

The women's 100 metres hurdles at the 1998 European Athletics Championships was held at the Népstadion on 23 August.

== Medalists ==
| Gold | Svetla Dimitrova; Bulgaria |
| Silver | Brigita Bukovec; Slovenia |
| Bronze | Irina Korotya; Russia |

== Results ==
| KEY: | q | Fastest non-qualifiers | Q | Qualified | NR | National record | PB | Personal best | SB | Seasonal best |

=== Round 1 ===
Qualification: First 2 in each heat (Q) and the next 2 fastest (q) advance to the Final.

| Rank | Heat | Name | Nationality | Time | Notes |
|---|---|---|---|---|---|
| 1 | 1 | Svetla Dimitrova | Bulgaria | 12.62 | Q |
| 2 | 3 | Brigita Bukovec | Slovenia | 12.94 | Q |
| 3 | 1 | Nicole Ramalalanirina | France | 13.03 | Q |
| 4 | 1 | Heike Blaßneck | Germany | 13.07 | q |
| 5 | 2 | Irina Korotya | Russia | 13.09 | Q |
| 6 | 1 | Julie Baumann | Switzerland | 13.16 | q |
| 7 | 2 | Patricia Girard | France | 13.18 | Q |
| 8 | 1 | Anna Leszczyńska-Łazor | Poland | 13.25 | |
| 9 | 2 | Caren Sonn | Germany | 13.29 | |
| 10 | 3 | Linda Ferga | France | 13.34 | Q |
| 11 | 3 | Olena Krasovska | Ukraine | 13.43 | |
| 12 | 2 | Nadezhda Bodrova | Ukraine | 13.47 | |
| 13 | 3 | Tatyana Reshetnikova | Russia | 13.48 | |
| 14 | 2 | Susan Smith | Ireland | 13.51 | |
| 14 | 3 | Andrea Novotná | Czech Republic | 13.51 | |
| 16 | 1 | Sandra Turpin | Portugal | 13.58 | |
| 17 | 2 | Anita Trumpe | Latvia | 13.65 | |
| 18 | 3 | María Mardomingo | Spain | 13.66 | |
| 19 | 1 | Johanna Halkoaho | Finland | 13.69 | |

=== Final ===
| Rank | Name | Nationality | Time | Notes |
|---|---|---|---|---|
| 1st place, gold medalist(s) | Svetla Dimitrova | Bulgaria | 12.56 | SB |
| 2nd place, silver medalist(s) | Brigita Bukovec | Slovenia | 12.65 | SB |
| 3rd place, bronze medalist(s) | Irina Korotya | Russia | 12.85 | |
| 4 | Nicole Ramalalanirina | France | 12.87 | |
| 5 | Patricia Girard | France | 12.89 | |
| 6 | Heike Blaßneck | Germany | 13.02 | |
| 7 | Julie Baumann | Switzerland | 13.15 | |
| 8 | Linda Ferga | France | 13.22 | |
