= Sonia Paquette =

Canadian hurdler

Personal information
- Born: 7 February 1973 (age 53) Saint-Janvier-de-Joly, Quebec, Canada

Sport
- Sport: Track and field
Medal record
Representing Canada
World Indoor Championships
Silver medal – second place	1993 Toronto	Medley relay
Summer Universiade
Bronze medal – third place	1997 Catania	4x100m relay

Sonia Paquette (born 7 February 1973) is a Canadian retired track and field athlete who specialised in the 100 metres hurdles. She represented her country at the 1996 Summer Olympics and the 1993 World Championships without qualifying for the semifinals.

She has personal bests of 13.11 seconds in the 110 metres hurdles (1996) and 8.26 seconds in the 60 metres hurdles (Ghent 1999).

She also took part in surf lifesaving competitions.

== Competition record ==
Year	Competition	Venue	Position	Event	Notes
Representing Canada and Quebec
1991	Pan American Junior Championships	Kingston, Jamaica	5th	100 m hurdles	14.14
1991	Pan American Junior Championships	Kingston, Jamaica	4th	4 × 100 m relay	46.29
1992	World Junior Championships	Seoul, South Korea	30th (qf)	100 m	12.18 (+0.4 m/s)
1992	World Junior Championships	Seoul, South Korea	4th	100 m hurdles	13.73 (+1.0 m/s)
1992	World Junior Championships	Seoul, South Korea	10th (h)	4 × 100 m relay	45.84
1993	World Indoor Championships	Toronto, Ontario, Canada	24th (h)	60 m hurdles	8.43
1993	World Indoor Championships	Toronto, Ontario, Canada	2nd	Medley relay	3:56.34
1993	Universiade	Buffalo, United States	5th	100 m hurdles	13.53
1993	World Championships	Stuttgart, Germany	34th (h)	100 m hurdles	13.51
1993	World Championships	Stuttgart, Germany	9th (h)	4 × 100 m relay	44.36
1994	Jeux de la Francophonie	Bondoufle, France	15th (sf)	100 m	12.07
1994	Jeux de la Francophonie	Bondoufle, France	11th (h)	100 m hurdles	13.68
1994	Jeux de la Francophonie	Bondoufle, France	–	4 × 100 m relay	DNF
1995	Universiade	Fukuoka, Japan	29th (qf)	100 m	12.26
1995	Universiade	Fukuoka, Japan	16th (h)	100 m hurdles	13.84
1995	Universiade	Fukuoka, Japan	8th	4 × 100 m relay	45.84
1996	Olympic Games	Atlanta, United States	33rd (h)	100 m hurdles	13.29
1997	Universiade	Catania, Italy	8th	100 m hurdles	13.68
1997	Universiade	Catania, Italy	3rd	4 × 100 m relay	44.59
1999	Universiade	Palma de Mallorca, Spain	9th (sf)	100 m hurdles	13.51
2001	Jeux de la Francophonie	Ottawa, Ontario, Canada	6th	100 m hurdles	13.28
2001	Universiade	Beijing, China	–	100 m hurdles	DNF
