= Andria King =

American hurdler (born 1976)

Personal information
- Born: June 22, 1976 (age 50) Atlanta, Georgia, United States

Sport
- Sport: Track and field
- Club: Georgia Tech Yellow Jackets
Medal record
Representing United States
Summer Universiade
Gold medal – first place	1999 Palma de Mallorca	100m hurdles

Andoria King (born June 22, 1976) is a retired American athlete who specialized in the 100 meters hurdles. She won the gold medal at the 1999 Summer Universiade. She also represented her country at the 1999 World Championships reaching the quarterfinals.

She has personal bests of 12.86 seconds in the 100 meters hurdles (Atlanta 1999) and 8.00 seconds in the 60 meters hurdles (Atlanta 1999).

She now works as an assistant track and field coach at the Georgia Institute of Technology.

== Competition record ==
Year	Competition	Venue	Position	Event	Notes
Representing the United States
1999	Universiade	Palma de Mallorca, Spain	1st	100 m hurdles	13.04
1999	Pan American Games	Winnipeg, Canada	7th	100 m hurdles	13.28
1999	World Championships	Seville, Spain	27th (qf)	100 m hurdles	13.31
