= Anna Leszczyńska-Łazor =

Polish athlete

Personal information
- Nationality: Polish
- Born: Anna Leszczyńska; 15 February 1971 (age 55)

Sport
- Sport: Track and field
- Event: 100 metres hurdles

Anna Leszczyńska-Łazor (born 15 February 1971) is a retired Polish athlete who competed in the sprint hurdles. She represented her country at the 1997 World Championships without finishing her heat. Her best result was the fourth place at the 1998 European Indoor Championships.

== International competitions ==
Year	Competition	Venue	Position	Event	Notes
Representing Poland
1988	World Junior Championships	Sudbury, Canada	5th	100 m hurdles	13.92
1989	European Junior Championships	Varaždin, Yugoslavia	10th (sf)	200 m	24.35
1989	European Junior Championships	Varaždin, Yugoslavia	7th	100 m hurdles	13.90
1990	World Junior Championships	Plovdiv, Bulgaria	9th (sf)	100 m hurdles	13.78
1996	European Indoor Championships	Stockholm, Sweden	9th (h)	60 m hurdles	8.24
1997	World Championships	Athens, Greece	–	100 m hurdles	DNF
1997	Universiade	Catania, Italy	10th (sf)	100 m hurdles	13.37
1998	European Indoor Championships	Valencia, Spain	4th	60 m hurdles	8.15
1998	European Championships	Budapest, Hungary	8th (h)	100 m hurdles	13.25
1999	World Indoor Championships	Maebashi, Japan	16th (h)	60 m hurdles	8.22

== Personal bests ==
Outdoor

- 100 metres – 11.49 (+0.9 m/s, Bydgoszcz 1997)
- 200 metres – 23.46 (+1.5 m/s, Piła 1996)
- 100 metres hurdles – 13.05 (0.0 m/s, Mannheim 1998)

Indoor

- 60 metres – 7.60 (Spała 1999)
- 200 metres – 24.90 (Halle 1999)
- 60 metres hurdles – 8.12 (Valencia 1998)
