= Odalys Adams =

Cuban hurdler (born 1966)

Personal information
- Born: August 1, 1966 (age 59) Camagüey, Cuba

Sport
- Sport: Track and field
Medal record
Representing Cuba
Pan American Games
| Silver medal – second place | 1991 Havana | 100m hurdles |
| Bronze medal – third place | 1995 Mar del Plata | 100m hurdles |
Central American and Caribbean Games
| Gold medal – first place | 1986 Santiago | 100m hurdles |
| Gold medal – first place | 1990 Mexico City | 4x100m relay |
| Silver medal – second place | 1990 Mexico City | 100m hurdles |

Odalys Adams Castillo (Spanish pronunciation: [oˈðalis ˈaðams]; born August 1, 1966) is a Cuban hurdler.

== International competitions ==
| Year | Competition | Venue | Position | Event | Notes |
Representing Cuba
| 1986 | Central American and Caribbean Games | Santiago, Dom. Rep. | 1st | 100 m hurdles | 13.50 |
| 1986 | Ibero-American Championships | Havana, Cuba | 1st | 100 m hurdles | 13.49 (wind: +1.9 m/s) |
| 1987 | Pan American Games | Indianapolis, United States | 5th | 100 m hurdles | 13.33 |
| 1988 | Ibero-American Championships | Mexico City, Mexico | 1st | 100 m hurdles | 13.28 (wind: 0.0 m/s) A |
| 1989 | Central American and Caribbean Championships | San Juan, Puerto Rico | 1st | 100 m hurdles | 13.01 |
| 1989 | Central American and Caribbean Championships | San Juan, Puerto Rico | 1st | 4 × 100 m relay | 45.12 |
| 1989 | Universiade | Duisburg, West Germany | 7th | 100 m hurdles | 12.95 |
| 1989 | World Cup | Barcelona, Spain | 4th | 100 m hurdles | 12.86^{1} |
| 1989 | World Cup | Barcelona, Spain | 4th | 4 × 100 m relay | 43.58^{1} |
| 1990 | Goodwill Games | Seattle, United States | 4th | 4 × 100 m relay | 44.35 |
| 1990 | Central American and Caribbean Games | Mexico City, Mexico | 2nd | 100 m hurdles | 13.26 A |
| 1990 | Central American and Caribbean Games | Mexico City, Mexico | 1st | 4 × 100 m relay | 44.54 |
| 1991 | World Indoor Championships | Seville, Spain | 8th | 60 m hurdles | 8.11 |
| 1991 | Pan American Games | Havana, Cuba | 2nd | 100 m hurdles | 13.06 |
| 1991 | World Championships | Tokyo, Japan | 16th (sf) | 100 m hurdles | 13.24 |
| 1992 | Ibero-American Championships | Seville, Spain | 2nd | 100 m hurdles | 13.15 (wind: -1.1 m/s) |
| 1992 | Olympic Games | Barcelona, Spain | 8th | 100 m hurdles | 13.57 (wind: +0.4 m/s) |
| 1995 | World Indoor Championships | Barcelona, Spain | 18th (h) | 60 m hurdles | 8.37 |
| 1995 | Pan American Games | Mar del Plata, Argentina | 3rd | 100 m hurdles | 13.17 w |
| 1995 | World Championships | Gothenburg, Sweden | 24th (h) | 100 m hurdles | 13.33 |
^{1} = Representing the Americas (#) = overall position in qualifying heats (h) or semifinals (sf)
