= Athletics at the 1991 Pan American Games – Women's 100 metres hurdles =

Women's 100 metres hurdles at the Pan American Games

The women's 100 metres hurdles event at the 1991 Pan American Games was held in Havana, Cuba on 7 August.

== Results ==
Wind: -1.7 m/s

Rank	Name	Nationality	Time	Notes
1st place, gold medalist(s)	Aliuska López	Cuba	12.99	
2nd place, silver medalist(s)	Odalys Adams	Cuba	13.06	
3rd place, bronze medalist(s)	Arnita Myricks	United States	13.23	
4	Dawn Bowles	United States	13.24	
5	Michelle Freeman	Jamaica	13.33	
6	Carmen Bezanilla	Chile	13.90	
7	Leslie Estwick	Canada	13.97	
	Dionne Rose	Jamaica	DNF	
