= Keri Lees =

English hurdler

Keri Lees née Maddox
Personal information
- Nationality: British (English)
- Born: 4 July 1972 (age 54) Stone, Staffordshire, England
- Height: 172 cm (5 ft 8 in)
- Weight: 63 kg (139 lb)

Sport
- Sport: Athletics
- Event: hurdles
- Club: Cannock & Stafford AC; Sale Harriers Manchester
Medal record
Representing Great Britain
Summer Universiade
Bronze medal – third place	1991 Sheffield	100m hurdles

Keri Lees (née Maddox; born 4 July 1972) is a female English retired athlete who competed at the 2000 Summer Olympics as well as three World Championships (1993, 1999, 2001). She competed in the 100 metres hurdles and 400 metres hurdles.

== Biography ==
Maddox became the British 400 metres hurdles champion after winning the British AAA Championships title at the 1997 AAA Championships.

Maddox won the 100 metres AAA title in 1998 and then represented England in both the 100 metres hurdles and 400 metres hurdles events, at the 1998 Commonwealth Games in Kuala Lumpur, Malaysia.

Maddox retained the 100 metres AAA title in 1999 and regained the 400 metres hurdles AAA title at the 2000 AAA Championships and shortly afterwards represented Great Britain at the 2000 Olympic Games in Sydney.

== Competition record ==
Year	Competition	Venue	Position	Event	Notes
Representing Great Britain and England
1989	European Junior Championships	Varaždin, Yugoslavia	12th (h)	100 m hurdles	14.43
1990	World Junior Championships	Plovdiv, Bulgaria	2nd	100 m hurdles	13.38 (+0.3 m/s)
1991	Universiade	Sheffield, United Kingdom	3rd	100 m hurdles	13.32
1991	European Junior Championships	Thessaloniki, Greece	1st	100 m hurdles	13.39
1991	European Junior Championships	Thessaloniki, Greece	5th	4 × 400 m relay	3:39.36
1993	Universiade	Buffalo, United States	11th (h)	100 m hurdles	13.45
1993	Universiade	Buffalo, United States	–	4 × 100 m relay	DNF
1993	Universiade	Buffalo, United States	6th	4 × 400 m relay	3:38.07
1993	World Championships	Stuttgart, Germany	29th (h)	100 m hurdles	13.49
1998	Commonwealth Games	Kuala Lumpur, Malaysia	6th	100 m hurdles	13.30
1998	Commonwealth Games	Kuala Lumpur, Malaysia	4th	400 m hurdles	56.38
1999	World Indoor Championships	Maebashi, Japan	15th (h)	60 m hurdles	8.22
1999	European Cup Super League	Paris, France	2nd	100 m hurdles	12.97
1999	World Championships	Seville, Spain	26th (qf)	100 m hurdles	13.21
1999	World Championships	Seville, Spain	15th (h)	400 m hurdles	55.33
2000	Olympic Games	Sydney, Australia	22nd (h)	400 m hurdles	57.44
2001	World Championships	Edmonton, Canada	23rd (h)	400 m hurdles	57.55

== Personal bests ==
Outdoor

- 100 metres hurdles – 12.95 (+1.1 m/s) (Seville 1999)
- 400 metres hurdles – 55.22 (Birmingham 2000)

Indoor

- 60 metres hurdles – 8.17 (Maebashi 1999)
