= Athletics at the 1987 Pan American Games – Women's 100 metres hurdles =

Women's 100 metres hurdles at the Pan American Games

The women's 100 metres hurdles event at the 1987 Pan American Games was held in Indianapolis, United States, on 13 and 15 August.

== Medalists ==
Gold	Silver	Bronze
LaVonna Martin; United States	Stephanie Hightower; United States	Aliuska López; Cuba

== Results ==
=== Heats ===
Wind:
Heat 1: +0.2 m/s, Heat 2: -0.6 m/s

Rank	Heat	Name	Nationality	Time	Notes
1	1	LaVonna Martin	United States	13.02	Q, GR
2	2	Stephanie Hightower	United States	13.11	Q
3	1	Nancy Vallecilla	Ecuador	13.16	Q, NR
4	2	Aliuska López	Cuba	13.47	Q
5	1	Karen Nelson	Canada	13.54	Q
6	2	Sandra Tavares	Mexico	13.63	Q
7	1	Odalys Adams	Cuba	13.73	q
8	2	Beatriz Capotosto	Argentina	14.08	q
9	1	Erodina Barbosa	Brazil	14.12	
10	2	Carmen Bezanilla	Chile	14.17	

=== Final ===
Wind: +1.8 m/s

Rank	Lane	Name	Nationality	Time	Notes
1st place, gold medalist(s)	5	LaVonna Martin	United States	12.81	GR
2nd place, silver medalist(s)	3	Stephanie Hightower	United States	12.82	
3rd place, bronze medalist(s)	6	Aliuska López	Cuba	12.91	
4	4	Nancy Vallecilla	Ecuador	13.20	
5		Odalys Adams	Cuba	13.33	
6	1	Karen Nelson	Canada	13.38	
	2	Sandra Tavares	Mexico	DNF	
		Beatriz Capotosto	Argentina	DNF	
