= Aliuska López =

Spanish athlete of Cuban origin (born 1969)

Personal information
- Full name: Aliuska Yanira López Pedroso
- Born: August 29, 1969 (age 57) Havana, Cuba
Medal record
Women's Athletics
Representing Cuba
World Indoor Championships
Gold medal – first place	1995 Barcelona	60 m hurdles
Bronze medal – third place	1991 Seville	60 m hurdles
Pan American Games
Gold medal – first place	1991 Havana	100 m hurdles
Gold medal – first place	1995 Mar del Plata	100 m hurdles
Gold medal – first place	1999 Winnipeg	100 m hurdles
Bronze medal – third place	1987 Indianapolis	100 m hurdles
Bronze medal – third place	1987 Indianapolis	4x100 m
Summer Universiade
Silver medal – second place	1987 Zagreb	100 m hurdles

Aliuska López (Spanish pronunciation: [aˈljuska ˈlopes]; Aliuska Yanira López Pedroso; born August 29, 1969) is a Spanish athlete of Cuban origin. She competes mostly in hurdling. The world junior champion from 1988, she is still the world junior record holder at 100 metres hurdles. She was a very successful athlete while competing for her birthcountry Cuba, later switching nationality to Spain.

López is the cousin of long jumper Iván Pedroso.

== Personal bests ==
- 100 metres hurdles – 12.67 (1996)
- 100 metres – 11.53 (1987)
- 200 metres – 24.22 (1987)

== International competitions ==
Year	Competition	Venue	Position	Event	Notes
Representing Cuba
1986	CAC Junior Championships (U-20)	Mexico City, Mexico	3rd	200 m	24.65 A
1986	CAC Junior Championships (U-20)	Mexico City, Mexico	1st	100 m hurdles	13.56 A
1986	Pan American Junior Championships	Winter Park, United States	2nd	100 m hurdles	13.53
1986	World Junior Championships	Athens, Greece	2nd	100 m hurdles	13.14 (−0.8 m/s)
1987	World Indoor Championships	Indianapolis, United States	7th	60 m hurdles	8.25
1987	Universiade	Zagreb, Yugoslavia	2nd	100 m hurdles	12.84
1987	Universiade	Zagreb, Yugoslavia	5th	4 × 100 m relay	44.06
1987	Pan American Games	Indianapolis, United States	3rd	100 m hurdles	12.91
1987	World Championships	Rome, Italy	15th (sf)	100 m hurdles	13.31 (−0.9 m/s)
1987	World Championships	Rome, Italy	7th	4 × 100 m relay	43.66
1988	World Junior Championships	Sudbury, Canada	1st	100m hurdles	13.23 (−2.6 m/s)
1988	World Junior Championships	Sudbury, Canada	2nd	4 × 100 m relay	44.04
1989	World Indoor Championships	Budapest, Hungary	7th (h)	60 m hurdles	8.08
1989	CAC Championships	San Juan, Puerto Rico	2nd	100 m hurdles	13.33
1989	CAC Championships	San Juan, Puerto Rico	1st	4 × 100 m relay	45.12
1989	Universiade	Duisburg, West Germany	4th	100 m hurdles	12.87
1989	Universiade	Duisburg, West Germany	5th	4 × 100 m relay	44.73
1990	Goodwill Games	Seattle, United States	5th	100 m hurdles	12.99
1990	Goodwill Games	Seattle, United States	4th	4 × 100 m relay	44.35
1990	CAC Games	Mexico City, Mexico	1st	100 m hurdles	12.94
1990	CAC Games	Mexico City, Mexico	1st	4 × 100 m relay	44.54
1991	World Indoor Championships	Seville, Spain	3rd	60 m hurdles	8.03
1991	Pan American Games	Havana, Cuba	1st	100 m hurdles	12.99
1991	World Championships	Tokyo, Japan	7th	100 m hurdles	13.06 (−1.7 m/s)
1991	World Championships	Tokyo, Japan	6th	4 × 100 m relay	43.75
1992	Ibero-American Championships	Seville, Spain	1st	100 m hurdles	13.13 (−1.1 m/s)
1992	Olympic Games	Barcelona, Spain	6th	100 m hurdles	12.87 (0.4 m/s)
1992	Olympic Games	Barcelona, Spain	—	4 × 100 m relay	DNF
1992	World Cup	Havana, Cuba	1st	100 m hurdles	13.06
1993	World Indoor Championships	Toronto, Ontario, Canada	5th	60 m hurdles	8.11
1993	World Championships	Stuttgart, Germany	4th	100 m hurdles	12.73 (0.2 m/s)
1993	World Championships	Stuttgart, Germany	6th	4 × 100 m relay	42.89
1993	CAC Games	Ponce, Puerto Rico	1st	100 m hurdles	13.46
1993	CAC Games	Ponce, Puerto Rico	1st	4 × 100 m relay	44.59
1994	Goodwill Games	St. Petersburg, Russia	2nd	100 m hurdles	12.88 (w)
1994	Goodwill Games	St. Petersburg, Russia	2nd	4 × 100 m relay	43.37
1994	World Cup	London, United Kingdom	1st	100 m hurdles	12.91
1994	World Cup	London, United Kingdom	7th	4 × 100 m relay	44.26
1995	World Indoor Championships	Barcelona, Spain	1st	60 m hurdles	7.92
1995	Pan American Games	Mar del Plata, Argentina	1st	100 m hurdles	12.68 (w)
1995	World Championships	Gothenburg, Sweden	12th (sf)	100 m hurdles	12.98 (−0.3 m/s)
1995	World Championships	Gothenburg, Sweden	–	4 × 100 m relay	DQ
1996	Olympic Games	Atlanta, United States	7th (sf)	100 m hurdles	12.70 (1.0 m/s)
1996	Olympic Games	Atlanta, United States	12th (h)	4 × 100 m relay	44.32
1997	World Indoor Championships	Paris, France	18th (h)	60 m hurdles	8.31
1997	CAC Championships	San Juan, Puerto Rico	1st	100 m hurdles	13.19
1997	World Championships	Athens, Greece	24th (h)	100 m hurdles	13.19 (−1.6 m/s)
1999	Pan American Games	Winnipeg, Manitoba, Canada	1st	100 m hurdles	12.76 (1.2 m/s)
1999	World Championships	Seville, Spain	9th (sf)	100 m hurdles	12.83 (1.0 m/s)
2000	Olympic Games	Sydney, Australia	5th	100 m hurdles	12.83 (0.0 m/s)
Representing Spain
2004	World Indoor Championships	Budapest, Hungary	9th (h)	60 m hurdles	8.01
2004	Ibero-American Championships	Huelva, Spain	1st	100 m hurdles	13.25 (−2.1 m/s)
2004	Olympic Games	Athens, Greece	24th (h)	100 m hurdles	13.21 (−1.2 m/s)
2005	European Indoor Championships	Madrid, Spain	13th (sf)	60 m hurdles	8.15
2005	Mediterranean Games	Almería, Spain	5th	100 m hurdles	13.51
2006	European Championships	Gothenburg, Sweden	33rd (h)	100 m hurdles	13.73

Note: At the World Cup in both 1992 and 1994, Lopez was representing the Americas Continent.
