= Nguyễn Thị Thu Hằng =

Vietnamese hurdler

Personal information
- Nationality: Vietnamese
- Born: 21 March 1969 (age 57)

Sport
- Sport: Track and field
- Event: 100 metres hurdles

Nguyễn Thị Thu Hằng (born 21 March 1969) is a Vietnamese hurdler. She competed in the women's 100 metres hurdles at the 1992 Summer Olympics.
