= Space Carnival Marathon =

Annual race in Korolyov, Russia

- Date: September
- Location: Korolyov, Russia
- Event type: Road
- Distance: Marathon, Half marathon, 10K run, 5K run
- Established: 1977
- Website: Space Marathon

Space Carnival Marathon (Russian: Космический марафон) is one of the oldest running marathon footraces in Russia. Held continually from 1977 to 2019, the marathon takes place in Korolyov, Russia, (formerly named Kaliningrad), the city 17 miles north of Moscow known for its rocket engine development and engineering for space exploration.

== History ==
The first Space Marathons took place at the forefront of the running boom, when marathoning was just becoming a viable competitive sport due to race sponsorships and the reforming of the amateur athlete regulations. The race grew from a small obscure event in the science-based city to become one of the largest in the Soviet Union—by 1982, more than 1,000 runners participated.

Now an event with other smaller races, it has struggled to compete with the larger and more international Moscow Marathon. Still, the Space Marathon was responsible for a few breakthroughs in Russian racing: It was the first to allow women and children to compete.

== Results ==
The 2019 race was won by Alexandrovich Kuftyrev Artem in 2:27:58. Irina Shevchenko won for the women in 2:56:29. A total of 144 finished.

The 2021 race was won by Vitaly Loginov in 2:29:34. Olga Krutenyuk won for the women in 2:52:37. A total of 74 runners finished.
