= 1991 World Championships in Athletics – Women's 100 metres hurdles =

These are the official results of the Women's 100 metres hurdles event at the 1991 IAAF World Championships in Tokyo, Japan. There were a total number of 33 participating athletes, with two semi-finals and five qualifying heats and the final held on Friday August 30, 1991.

== Medalists ==
Gold	Lyudmila Narozhilenko; Soviet Union (URS)
Silver	Gail Devers; United States (USA)
Bronze	Nataliya Grygoryeva; Soviet Union (URS)

== Final ==
RANK	FINAL	TIME
1st place, gold medalist(s)	Lyudmila Narozhilenko (URS)	12.59
2nd place, silver medalist(s)	Gail Devers (USA)	12.63
3rd place, bronze medalist(s)	Nataliya Grygoryeva (URS)	12.69
4.	Monique Éwanjé-Épée (FRA)	12.84
5.	Julie Baumann (SUI)	12.88
6.	Florence Colle (FRA)	13.01
7.	Aliuska López (CUB)	13.06
8.	Kristin Patzwahl (GER)	13.07

== Semi-finals ==
- Held on Thursday 1991-08-29

RANK	HEAT 1	TIME
1.	Nataliya Grygoryeva (URS)	12.66
2.	Gail Devers (USA)	12.71
3.	Monique Éwanjé-Épée (FRA)	12.88
4.	Kristin Patzwahl (GER)	13.11
5.	Michelle Freeman (JAM)	13.17
6.	Sylvia Dethier (BEL)	13.18
7.	Kay Morley-Brown (GBR)	13.24
8.	Odalys Adams (CUB)	13.26

RANK	HEAT 2	TIME
1.	Lyudmila Narozhilenko (URS)	12.52
2.	Aliuska López (CUB)	12.91
3.	Florence Colle (FRA)	12.94
4.	Julie Baumann (SUI)	12.94
5.	Anne Piquereau (FRA)	13.02
6.	Arnita Myricks (USA)	13.12
7.	María José Mardomingo (ESP)	13.19
8.	Zhang Yu (CHN)	13.24

== Qualifying heats ==
- Held on Thursday 1991-08-29

RANK	HEAT 1	TIME
1.	Zhang Yu (CHN)	13.12
2.	Arnita Myricks (USA)	13.12
3.	Anne Piquereau (FRA)	13.20
4.	Lesley-Ann Skeete (GBR)	13.33
5.	Mihaela Pogăcean (ROM)	13.38
6.	Cornelia Oschkenat (GER)	13.55

RANK	HEAT 2	TIME
1.	Nataliya Grygoryeva (URS)	13.02
2.	Odalys Adams (CUB)	13.30
3.	Paraskevi Patoulidou (GRE)	13.41
4.	Liliana Nastase (ROM)	13.41
5.	Donalda Duprey (CAN)	13.75
6.	Carmen Bezanilla (CHI)	14.01
–	Yasmina Azzizi (ALG)	DNS

RANK	HEAT 3	TIME
1.	Gail Devers (USA)	12.77
2.	Michelle Freeman (JAM)	13.10
3.	Florence Colle (FRA)	13.12
4.	María José Mardomingo (ESP)	13.22
5.	Gloria Siebert (GER)	13.29
6.	Luo Bin (CHN)	13.53

RANK	HEAT 4	TIME
1.	Monique Éwanjé-Épée (FRA)	12.92
2.	Aliuska López (CUB)	13.10
3.	Kay Morley-Brown (GBR)	13.24
4.	Nadezhda Bodrova (URS)	13.34
5.	Brigita Bukovec (YUG)	13.44
6.	Monica Pellegrinelli (SUI)	13.49
7.	Wang Shu-Hwa (TPE)	13.81

RANK	HEAT 5	TIME
1.	Lyudmila Narozhilenko (URS)	12.66
2.	Julie Baumann (SUI)	12.86
3.	Sylvia Dethier (BEL)	13.07
4.	Kristin Patzwahl (GER)	13.08
5.	Dawn Bowles (USA)	13.41
6.	Michelle Edwards (GBR)	13.50
7.	Ayumi Sasaki (JPN)	13.85

== See also ==
- 1988 Women's Olympic 100m Hurdles (Seoul)
- 1990 European World Championships 100m Hurdles (Split)
- 1992 Women's Olympic 100m Hurdles (Barcelona)
- 1994 European World Championships 100m Hurdles (Helsinki)
