= Elizabeta Pavlovska =

Macedonian hurdler

Personal information
- Nationality: Macedonian
- Born: 24 September 1972 (age 53)
- Height: 170 cm (5 ft 7 in)
- Weight: 62 kg (137 lb)

Sport
- Sport: Track and field
- Event: 100 metres hurdles

Elizabeta Pavlovska (Macedonian: Елизабета Павловска; born 24 September 1972) is a Macedonian hurdler. She competed in the women's 100 metres hurdles at the 1992 Summer Olympics as an Independent Olympic Participant.
