= Lesley-Ann Skeete =

English track and field athlete

Personal information
- Nationality: British (English)
- Born: 20 February 1967 (age 59) Sydenham, London
- Height: 166 cm (5 ft 5 in)
- Weight: 54 kg (119 lb)

Sport
- Sport: Athletics
- Event: 100m hurdles
- Club: Swindon Harriers; Stretford AC
Medal record
Athletics
Representing England
Commonwealth Games
Bronze medal – third place	1990 Auckland	100 m hurdles

Lesley-Ann Skeete (born 20 February 1967) is a female English former track and field athlete who competed in the 100 metres hurdles. She represented Great Britain at the 1988 Olympic Games in Seoul and the 1992 Olympic Games in Barcelona. She also won a bronze medal at the 1990 Commonwealth Games in Auckland.

== Biography ==
Skeete was born in Sydenham, England, and was raised in Swindon. She first came to prominence in 1985 as a teenager, winning the first of two English Schools 100 metres hurdles titles and placing third at the UK Championships behind Judy Simpson and Judith Rodgers in 13.76 seconds. She began 1986 by claiming her first senior national title at the AAAs indoor championships, winning the 60 m hurdles in 8.22 secs. In the summer of 1986, Skeete placed second in the 100 m hurdles at both the UK Championships and the AAA Championships behind Sally Gunnell and ahead of both Wendy Jeal and Olympic silver medalist Shirley Strong. At the Commonwealth Games in Edinburgh, she finished fifth for England in the final in a time of 13.66.

In the 1987 indoor season, after retaining her AAAs title, Skeete reached the 60 m hurdles final at both the European Indoor Championships and the World Indoor Championships. At the Europeans in Lievin, she was fifth in 8.07, having run a UK record of 8.06 in both the heats and semis. At the World Indoors in Indianapolis, she was sixth in 8.18 secs. Outdoors, she won the UK title in 13.29, ahead of Kim Hagger and Wendy Jeal before again finishing second to Sally Gunnell at the AAAs Championships. At the World Championships in Rome, she was eliminated in the heats in 13.40.

In 1988, Skeete finished second to Gunnell at the AAAs Championships, earning selection for the 1988 Olympic Games in Seoul, South Korea. In Seoul, she reached the semi-finals, running 13.23. In 1989, Skeete won her third AAAs 60 m hurdles title indoors, while outdoors, she finished second at the UK Championships and third at the AAAs Championships. In January 1990 at the Commonwealth Games in Auckland, she won the bronze medal for England in time of 13.31, behind Kay Morley and Sally Gunnell. Later that year, she ran her lifetime best in the 100 m hurdles to win the AAAs title, edging out Kay Morley 13.03 to 13.05. At the 1990 European Championships in Split, she reached the semi-finals, where she ran 13.37.

In 1991, Skeete won her fourth AAAs indoor 60 m hurdles title and reached the semi-finals at the World Indoor Championships in Seville, running 8.15. In the summer, she won her second UK title, before finishing second to Sally Gunnell (for the fourth time) at the AAAs Championships, Gunnell narrowly winning, 13.02 to 13.05. At the World Championships in Tokyo, she was eliminated in the heats in 13.33.

Skeekte began the 1992 summer season by finishing second at the UK Championships in June. Running into a strong headwind, she narrowly lost to Kay Morley-Brown, 13.59 to 13.67. In July at the AAAs Championships, incorporating the Olympic trials, she finished third behind Gunnell and Morley-Brown in a season's best of 13.38, earning selection for the Olympic Games in Barcelona, Spain. In Barcelona, she was eliminated in the heats in 13.42. The 1992 Olympics would prove to be Skeete's final appearance at a major Championships.

Skeete has a total of 14 top three placements in the 100m hurdles at the AAA and UK Championships (three wins). Her final top three finish came in 1994, when she finished third behind Clova Court and Sally Gunnell at the AAA Championships. As of 2018, her lifetime best of 8.06 in the 60 m hurdles, ranks her 10th on the UK all-time list. In the 100 m hurdles, her best of 13.03, ranks her 16th on the UK all-time list.

== Competition record ==
Year	Competition	Venue	Position	Event	Notes
Representing Great Britain / England
1985	European Junior Championships	Cottbus, East Germany	5th	100 m hurdles	13.51
1986	European Indoor Championships	Madrid, Spain	14th (h)	60 m hurdles	8.40
1986	Commonwealth Games	Edinburgh, United Kingdom	5th	100 m hurdles	13.66
1987	European Indoor Championships	Liévin, France	5th	60 m hurdles	8.07
1987	World Indoor Championships	Indianapolis, United States	6th	60 m hurdles	8.18
1987	European Cup	Prague, Czechoslovakia	7th	100 m hurdles	13.66
1987	World Championships	Rome, Italy	17th (h)	100 m hurdles	13.40
1988	Olympic Games	Seoul, South Korea	12th (sf)	100 m hurdles	13.23
1989	European Indoor Championships	The Hague, Netherlands	10th (h)	60 m hurdles	8.31
1990	Commonwealth Games	Auckland, New Zealand	3rd	100 m hurdles	13.31
1990	European Championships	Split, Yugoslavia	14th (sf)	100 m hurdles	13.37
1991	World Indoor Championships	Seville, Spain	10th (sf)	60 m hurdles	8.15
1991	European Cup	Frankfurt, Germany	5th	100 m hurdles	13.26
1991	World Championships	Tokyo, Japan	18th (h)	100 m hurdles	13.33
1992	Olympic Games	Barcelona, Spain	25th (h)	100 m hurdles	13.42
National Championships
1985	UK Championships	Antrim, UK	3rd	100 m hurdles	13.76
1986	UK Championships	Cwmbran, UK	2nd	100 m hurdles	13.57
1986	AAA Championships	Birmingham, UK	2nd	100 m hurdles	13.24w
1987	UK Championships	Derby, UK	1st	100 m hurdles	13.29
1987	AAA Championships	Birmingham, UK	2nd	100 m hurdles	13.18
1988	AAA Championships	Birmingham, UK	2nd	100 m hurdles	13.19
1989	UK Championships	Jarrow, UK	2nd	100 m hurdles	13.42
1989	AAA Championships	Birmingham, UK	3rd	100 m hurdles	13.38
1990	AAA Championships	Birmingham, UK	1st	100 m hurdles	13.03
1991	UK Championships	Cardiff, UK	1st	100 m hurdles	13.66
1991	AAA Championships	Birmingham, UK	2nd	100 m hurdles	13.05
1992	UK Championships	Sheffield, UK	2nd	100 m hurdles	13.67
1992	AAA Championships	Birmingham, UK	3rd	100 m hurdles	13.38
1994	AAA Championships	Sheffield, UK	3rd	100 m hurdles	13.43
(#) Indicates overall position in qualifying heats (h) or semi-finals (sf)

- Four AAA Indoor Championships 60 metres hurdles titles (1986, 1987, 1989, 1991)
