= Ime Akpan =

Nigerian hurdler (born 1972)

Personal information
- Born: 27 April 1972 (age 54)
Medal record
Women's athletics
Representing Nigeria
All-Africa Games
| Gold medal – first place | 1991 Cairo | 100 m hurdles |
African Championships
| Gold medal – first place | 1992 Belle Vue Harel | 100 m hurdles |
| Silver medal – second place | 1992 Belle Vue Harel | 4×100 m |

Ime Akpan (born 27 April 1972) is a Nigerian track and field athlete, who competed in the women's 100 metres hurdling event during her career. She is a one-time Olympian (1996), and won a gold medal at the 1991 All-Africa Games in Cairo, Egypt.

Akpan was an All-American hurdler for the Arizona State Sun Devils track and field team, finishing runner-up in the 100 metres hurdles at the 1993 NCAA Division I Outdoor Track and Field Championships. Earlier, she was an All-American for the Utah State Aggies track and field team, finishing 4th in the 55 metres hurdles at the 1990 NCAA Division I Indoor Track and Field Championships.

== Competition record ==
| Year | Competition | Venue | Position | Event | Notes |
Representing Nigeria
| 1991 | Universiade | Sheffield, United Kingdom | 8th | 100 m hurdles | 13.74 |
| 1991 | All-Africa Games | Cairo, Egypt | 1st | 100 m hurdles | 13.44 |
| 1992 | African Championships | Belle Vue Maurel, Mauritius | 1st | 100 m hurdles | 13.14 |
| 1992 | World Cup | Havana, Cuba | 6th | 100 m hurdles | 13.57 |
| 1993 | Universiade | Buffalo, United States | – | 100 m hurdles | DQ |
| 1995 | Universiade | Fukuoka, Japan | 4th | 100 m hurdles | 13.11 |
| 1995 | All-Africa Games | Harare, Zimbabwe | 3rd | 100 m hurdles | 13.09 |
| 1996 | Olympic Games | Atlanta, United States | 26th (q) | 100 m hurdles | 13.11 |
