= Marina Azyabina =

Russian hurdler (born 1963)

Personal information
- Born: 15 June 1963 (age 63) Izhevsk, Soviet Union

Sport
- Sport: Track and field
Medal record
Representing Soviet Union
Summer Universiade
Gold medal – first place	1991 Sheffield	100m hurdles
Representing Russia
World Championships
Silver medal – second place	1993 Stuttgart	100m hurdles

Marina Eduardovna Azyabina (Russian: Марина Азябина; born 15 June 1963) is a retired Russian hurdler who competed in the 100 metres hurdles. Her personal best was 12.47 seconds, achieved in June 1992 in Moscow. She was a silver medallist for Russia at the 1993 World Championships in Athletics and later won a bronze medal at the 1994 Goodwill Games in Saint Petersburg. She competed for the Soviet Union before its dissolution, winning gold in the hurdles at the 1991 Summer Universiade.

At national level she was the 1993 winner at the Russian Athletics Championships, and also won at the 1992 CIS Athletics Championships.

== International competitions ==
Year	Competition	Venue	Position	Event	Time	Notes
Representing the Soviet Union
1991	Universiade	Sheffield, United Kingdom	1st	100 m hurdles	12.95	
Representing Russia
1993	World Championships	Stuttgart, Germany	2nd	100 m hurdles	12.60	
1994	European Championships	Helsinki, Finland	15th (sf)	100 m hurdles	13.42	wind: -1.9 m/s
1994	Goodwill Games	Saint Petersburg, Russia	3rd	100 m hurdles	12.99	w

== See also ==
- List of World Athletics Championships medalists (women)
