= Sylvia Dethier =

Belgian hurdler

Personal information
- Born: May 20, 1965 (age 61) Acosse, Belgium
- Height: 1.64 m (5 ft 5 in)
- Weight: 55 kg (121 lb)

Sport
- Sport: Track and field
- Events: 60 m hurdles, 100 m hurdles
- Club: CABW

Sylvia Dethier (born 20 May 1965 in Acosse) is a retired Belgian athlete who specialised in the sprint hurdles. She represented her country at the 1988 and 1992 Summer Olympics, as well as one outdoor and three indoor World Championships.

Her personal bests are 12.98 seconds in the 100 metres hurdles (Brussels 1991) and 8.09 seconds in the 60 metres hurdles (Hoboken 1993).

She has a twin sister, Françoise, who was also a hurdler.

== Competition record ==
Year	Competition	Venue	Position	Event	Notes
Representing Belgium
1983	European Junior Championships	Schwechat, Austria	11th (sf)	100 m hurdles	13.92
1987	European Indoor Championships	Liévin, France	16th (h)	60 m hurdles	8.36
1988	Olympic Games	Seoul, South Korea	–	100 m hurdles	DQ
1989	European Indoor Championships	The Hague, Netherlands	8th	60 m hurdles	8.36
1989	World Indoor Championships	Budapest, Hungary	10th (h)	60 m hurdles	8.29
1990	European Indoor Championships	Glasgow, United Kingdom	9th (h)	60 m hurdles	8.29
1991	World Indoor Championships	Seville, Spain	13th (sf)	60 m hurdles	8.21
1991	World Championships	Tokyo, Japan	12th (sf)	100 m hurdles	13.18
1992	European Indoor Championships	Genoa, Italy	11th (sf)	60 m hurdles	8.25
1992	Olympic Games	Barcelona, Spain	21st (qf)	100 m hurdles	13.32
1993	World Indoor Championships	Toronto, Canada	8th (h)	60 m hurdles	8.22
1994	Jeux de la Francophonie	Bondoufle, France	7th	100 m hurdles	13.79
