= Elisabeta Anghel =

Romanian hurdler

Personal information
- Nationality: Romanian
- Born: 21 October 1967 (age 58)

Sport
- Sport: Track and field
- Event: 100 metres hurdles

Elisabeta Anghel (born 21 October 1967) is a Romanian hurdler. She competed in the women's 100 metres hurdles at the 1996 Summer Olympics.
