= Kristin Patzwahl =

German hurdler

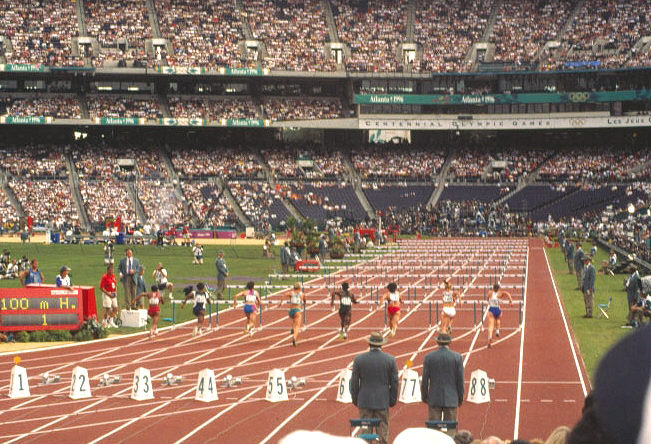
- Kristin Patzwahl (lane 7) at the 1996 Summer Olympics 100 m hs semi-final

Personal information
- Born: 16 July 1965 (age 61) Leipzig, East Germany

Sport
- Sport: Track and field

Kristin Patzwahl (born 16 July 1965) is a retired German hurdler.

She represented the sports clubs SC DHFK Leipzig and LAC Halensee Berlin, and became German champion in 1991, 1993 and 1994. Her personal best time was 12.80 seconds, achieved in June 1990 in Chemnitz.

== Achievements ==
Year	Competition	Venue	Position	Event	Notes
Representing East Germany
1990	European Championships	Split, Yugoslavia	7th	100 m hurdles	13.25 (wind: -0.9 m/s)
Representing Germany
1991	World Championships	Tokyo, Japan	8th	100 m hurdles	13.07
1992	European Indoor Championships	Genoa, Italy	6th	60 m hurdles	8.19
1994	European Championships	Helsinki, Finland	13th (sf)	100m hurdles	13.31 (wind: -1.9 m/s)
