= Birgit Hamann =

German hurdler

Birgit Hamann, née Wolf (born 11 September 1969 in Böblingen) is a retired German athlete who specialized in 100 metres hurdles. She competed for the club VfL Sindelfingen.

On 8 February 1986 in Sindelfingen she was involved in setting a new world indoor record of 1:33,56 minutes in 4 × 200 metres relay with the VfL Sindelfingen club team. The team consisted of Helga Arendt, Silke Knoll, Mechthild Kluth and Gisela Kinzel.

Wolf finished fourth at the 1986 World Junior Championships, won the 1987 European Junior Championships and finished second at the 1988 World Junior Championships. In addition she competed at the 1990 European Indoor Championships, the 1993 World Indoor Championships, the 1995 World Championships, the 1996 European Indoor Championships and the 1996 Summer Olympics without success.
