= Kay Morley-Brown =

British former athlete (born 1963)

Kay Morley-Brown née Morley
Personal information
- Nationality: British (Welsh)
- Born: 5 March 1963 (age 63) Swinton, England
- Height: 167 cm (5 ft 6 in)
- Weight: 60 kg (132 lb)

Sport
- Sport: Athletics
- Event: hurdles
- Club: Cardiff AAC
Medal record
Women's Athletics
Representing Wales
Commonwealth Games
Gold medal – first place	1990 Auckland	100 m hurdles

Kay Morley-Brown (née Morley, born 5 March 1963) is a British former athlete who competed in the 100 metres hurdles. Representing Wales, she won the 1990 Commonwealth Games 100 metres hurdles title, and went on to represent Great Britain at the 1992 Barcelona Olympics. Her sister, Sue Morley, is also a former international hurdler.

== Biography ==
Morley was born in Swinton, West Riding of Yorkshire, England. She was a member of the Cardiff Amateur Athletic Club and was coached by Malcolm Arnold. She won the Welsh Championships 100 metre hurdles title every year from 1986 to 1992. At the 1986 Commonwealth Games in Edinburgh, she finished seventh in the 100 m hurdles final in 13.83 secs.

Morley emerged as the UK's top sprint hurdler in 1989, winning the UK National title in 13.15 secs. She also finished second at the AAAs National Championships behind Sally Gunnell and competed at the European Cup, where she finished sixth.

Morley reached her peak in January 1990 at the Commonwealth Games in Auckland. After only qualifying for the final as a fastest loser, she won the gold medal in a lifetime best of 12.91 secs, with Gunnell second and Lesley-Ann Skeete third. This made her only the third British woman in history, after Shirley Strong and Gunnell, to run under 13 seconds for the 100 metres hurdles. In the summer of 1990, Morley retained her UK National title, but was again beaten to the AAAs National title, narrowly losing to Skeete (13.03 to 13.05). At the European Championships in Split she reached the semi-finals running 13.22.

In 1991, now married and competing as Kay Morley-Brown, she finished third at the AAAs Championships behind Gunnell and Skeete, earning selection for the World Championships in Tokyo, where she reached the semi-finals and ran 13.24.

Morley-Brown began 1992 by finishing second at the AAAs indoor Championships over 60m hurdles, and reaching the semi-finals at the European Indoor Championships in Genoa. Outdoors, she won her third UK National title with a narrow victory over Lesley-Anne Skeete, before finishing second to Sally Gunnell at the AAAs Championships (which were also the UK Olympic trials) earning Olympic selection. In Barcelona she was eliminated in the heats, running a disappointing 13.44 secs. This would be her last major competition.

As of 2018, Morley-Brown's Welsh records of 12.91 for the 100m hurdles and 8.16 for the 60m hurdles, still stand. She ranks 11th on the 100m hurdles UK all-time list.

== Later career ==
Morley-Brown has since become a teacher in Wiltshire.

== Records ==
- 12.91 Auckland, New Zealand 1990 – 100 metres hurdles Welsh National record
- 13.02 Wrexham, Wales 1990 – 100 metres hurdles Welsh All-Comers record
- 8.16 Glasgow, Scotland 1992 – 60 metres hurdles Welsh National record

== Competition record ==
Year	Competition	Venue	Position	Event	Notes
Representing Great Britain / Wales
1986	Commonwealth Games	Edinburgh, Scotland	7th	100 m hurdles	13.83
1989	European Cup	Gateshead, England	6th	100 m hurdles	13.19
1990	Commonwealth Games	Auckland, New Zealand	1st	100 m hurdles	12.91
1990	European Championships	Split, Yugoslavia	13th (sf)	100 m hurdles	13.22
1991	World Championships	Tokyo, Japan	14th (sf)	100 m hurdles	13.24
1992	European Indoor Championships	Genoa, Italy	9th (sf)	60 m hurdles	8.18
1992	Olympic Games	Barcelona, Spain	26th (h)	100 m hurdles	13.44
National Championships
1988	UK Championships	Derby, UK	3rd	100 m hurdles	13.83
1989	UK Championships	Jarrow, UK	1st	100 m hurdles	13.15
1989	AAA Championships	Birmingham, UK	2nd	100 m hurdles	13.35
1990	UK Championships	Cardiff, UK	1st	100 m hurdles	13.16w
1990	AAA Championships	Birmingham, UK	2nd	100 m hurdles	13.05
1991	AAA Championships	Birmingham, UK	3rd	100 m hurdles	13.17
1992	UK Championships	Sheffield, UK	1st	100 m hurdles	13.59
1992	AAA Championships	Birmingham, UK	2nd	100 m hurdles	13.28
(#) Indicates overall position in qualifying heats (h) or semi-finals (sf)

- Seven Welsh 100 metres hurdles titles (1986–92).
