= Heike Blaßneck =

German hurdler

Personal information
- Born: 26 July 1971 (age 55) Frankfurt, West Germany

Sport
- Sport: Track and field

Heike Eva Blaßneck (born 26 July 1971) is a retired German hurdler.

She finished eighth in the 60 m hurdles at the 1998 European Indoor Championships. She represented the sports club LAC Quelle Fürth/München, and won the silver medal at the German championships in 1998.

Her personal best time was 12.86 seconds, achieved in July 1998 in Nürnberg.
