= Gabi Roth =

German hurdler

Medal record

Women's athletics

Representing West Germany

European Championships
Silver medal – second place	1990 Split	4×100 m

Gabriele "Gabi" Roth (née Lippe; born 8 May 1967) is a retired German hurdler. She represented Germany at the 1992 Olympic Games in Barcelona.

== Career ==
Roth was born Gabrielle Lippe in Lörrach-Brombach, Germany and represented West Germany until 1990. She won a bronze medal in the 60 m hurdles at the 1989 European Indoor Championships in The Hague. At the 1990 European Championships in Split, she won a silver medal in 4 × 100 m relay, together with Ulrike Sarvari, Andrea Thomas and Silke Knoll. She also reached the 100 m hurdles final, but failed to finish. She represented a united Germany at the 1992 Olympic Games in Barcelona and reached the semi-finals of the 100 m hurdles. A month later at the World Cup in Havana, she won a bronze medal in the 100 m hurdles.

She represented the sports club MTG Mannheim, and won the silver medal at the German championships in 1996. Her personal best time was 12.82 seconds, achieved in August 1990 in Düsseldorf.

== International competitions ==
Year	Competition	Venue	Position	Event	Notes
Representing West Germany
1985	European Junior Championships	Cottbus, Germany	6th	100 m hurdles	13.54
1985	European Junior Championships	Cottbus, Germany	5th	4 × 100 m	45.28
1989	European Indoor Championships	The Hague, Netherlands	3rd	60 m hurdles	7.96
1990	European Championships	Split, Yugoslavia	dnf (f)	100 m hurdles	12.92 (semis)
1990	European Championships	Split, Yugoslavia	2nd	4 × 100 m	43.02
Representing Germany
1992	Olympic Games	Barcelona, Spain	10th (sf)	100 m hurdles	13.22
1992	World Cup	Havana, Cuba	3rd	100 m hurdles	13.34
1992	World Cup	Havana, Cuba	6th	4 × 100 m	44.63
Did not finish (dnf) final (f) at the 1990 European Championships. (sf) = overall position in semifinal round
