= Taiwo Aladefa =

Nigerian hurdler

Personal information
- Born: 19 December 1971 (age 54)

Sport
- Sport: Track and field
Medal record
Representing Nigeria
African Championships
Silver medal – second place	1993 Durban	100 m hurdles
Summer Universiade
Bronze medal – third place	1995 Fukuoka	4x100 m relay

Taiwo Aladefa (born 19 December 1971) is a retired Nigerian 100 m hurdler. She attended Alabama A&M university from 1989 until 1993. She is the school record holder in 100M hurdles (13.19sec) and was a 16 time NCAA All American athlete. Aladefa was a member of the first historically black college to ever win any NCAA track and field competition (1992). She competed in the women's 100 metres hurdles at the 1996 Summer Olympics.

She is still ranked amongst the top 10 fastest African 100 M Hurdlers of all time. She won gold at the 1995 All African games and silver medals at the 1991 All-Africa Games and the 1993 African Championships and won the 1995 All-Africa Games in a new championship record of 12.98 seconds.

Taiwo Aladefa was honored with Africa Legend in Athletics award in 2011 and also inducted into Alabama A&M University Sports Hall of Fame in August 2012. Her brother Kehinde Aladefa competed in 400 metres hurdles at the 1996 Summer Olympics and won a silver and bronze medal at the All-Africa Games in 1995 and 1999. He graduated from the University of Southern California.
