= Louise Fraser =

British hurdler

Personal information
- Nationality: British (English)
- Born: 10 October 1970 (age 55) Failsworth, Greater Manchester, England
- Height: 170 cm (5 ft 7 in)
- Weight: 56 kg (123 lb)

Sport
- Sport: Track and field
- Events: 100m & 400m hurdles
- Club: Trafford AC

Louise Marion Fraser (born 10 October 1970) is a female English former hurdler who competed at the 1992 Summer Olympics.

== Biography ==
Fraser represented England in the 100 metres hurdles event, at the 1990 Commonwealth Games in Auckland, New Zealand.

Fraser finished third behind Gowry Retchakan in the 400 metres hurdles event at the 1992 AAA Championships and then shortly afterwards at the 1992 Olympic Games in Barcelona, she represented Great Britain in the 400 metres hurdles event.

== International competitions ==
Year	Competition	Venue	Position	Event	Notes
Representing Great Britain / England
1988	World Junior Championships	Sudbury, Canada	14th (sf)	100 m hurdles	14.14
1989	European Junior Championships	Varaždin, Yugoslavia	4th	100 m hurdles	13.80
1990	Commonwealth Games	Auckland, New Zealand	DQ (final)^	100 m hurdles	13.54 (heats)
1992	Olympic Games	Barcelona, Spain	28th (h)	400 m hurdles	57.49
1995	World Championships	Gothenburg, Sweden	16th (h)	400 m hurdles	57.99
(#) Indicates overall position in qualifying heats (h) or semifinals (sf)

^Note: In the final at the 1990 Commonwealth Games, Fraser was disqualified after she hit the eighth and ninth hurdles and failed to finish.
