= Ludmila Engquist =

Russian former athlete

Personal information
- Born: 21 April 1964 (age 62) Tambov Oblast, Russian SFSR, Soviet Union
Medal record
Women's athletics
Olympic Games
Representing Sweden
Gold medal – first place	1996 Atlanta	100 m hurdles
World Championships
Representing the Soviet Union
Gold medal – first place	1991 Tokyo	100 m hurdles
Representing Sweden
Gold medal – first place	1997 Athens	100 m hurdles
Bronze medal – third place	1999 Seville	100 m hurdles
World Indoor Championships
Representing the Soviet Union
Gold medal – first place	1991 Seville	60 m hurdles
Silver medal – second place	1989 Budapest	60 m hurdles

Ludmila Viktorovna Engquist (née Leonova (Russian: Людмила Викторовна Нарожиленко-Леонова). formerly Narozhilenko; born 21 April 1964) is a Russian-Swedish former athlete, who competed mainly in the 100 metres hurdles. She competed for the Soviet Union (until 1991), Russia (from 1992) and Sweden (from 1996). She is the 1996 Olympic champion and the 1991 and 1997 World champion in the 100 m hurdles. Her best time of 12.26 secs in 1992, ranks her tied-seventh on the world all-time list. She is also a former world record holder in the 60 metres hurdles with 7.69 secs (1990).

== Biography ==
Engquist was born in Tambov Oblast, Soviet Union. During her first marriage her name was Ludmila Narozhilenko, which was also her name while she competed for the Soviet Union and Russia. She appeared for the Soviet Union at the 1988 Seoul Olympics, where she fell in her semifinal; and for the Unified Team at the 1992 Barcelona Olympics, where she was forced to withdraw from the semifinals due to injury.

In 1995, she married Swedish businessman Johan Engquist and in 1996 she became a Swedish citizen. She won gold medals in 100 m hurdles at the 1991 World Championships (for the Soviet Union) and 1997 World Championships as well as the 1996 Summer Olympics in Atlanta (both for Sweden). For her 1997 victory in Athens, Engquist received the Svenska Dagbladet Gold Medal, the first non-native Swede to win this award. During these years she became one of the most popular woman athletes of Sweden and was sometimes dubbed a role model for younger native Swedish talents. In 1996 and 1999 Engquist won the Jerring Award, an award that is voted upon by the radio audience.

In 1999 Engquist was diagnosed with breast cancer. After surgery she stopped chemotherapy after 4 treatments because she did not want the drugs to interfere with her athletic career, and successfully returned to the track.

After a distinguished athletic career she retired from running but wanted to become the first woman ever to win gold medals at both the Summer and Winter Olympics, by competing in and winning the inaugural two-woman bobsleigh event at the 2002 Winter Olympics. In late 2001, however, she was found guilty of having recently used banned drugs and barred from competition for two years. Her admission of drug use, though only during the recent part of her bobsleigh effort, made her a very controversial person in Sweden and considering that she had tested positive for banned drugs once before, during her days as a Soviet runner, and had sustained a ban (which was appealed and lifted after a while) some alleged that she had been using performance-enhancing substances regularly all the time, a claim for which there is no evidence. The penalty term ended on 3 December 2003, but Engquist never returned to competition again.

She currently lives in Spain with her husband Johan Engquist.

Awards
Preceded by Agneta Andersson & Susanne Gunnarsson	Svenska Dagbladet Gold Medal; 1997	Succeeded by Sweden men's national handball team
Sporting positions
Preceded by (Soviet Union) Nataliya Grygoryeva	Women's 100 m Hurdles Best Year Performance; 1991 — 1992	Succeeded by (United States) Gail Devers
Preceded by (Kazakhstan) Olga Shishigina	Women's 100 m Hurdles Best Year Performance; 1996 — 1997	Succeeded by (Nigeria) Glory Alozie
