= Athletics at the 1996 Summer Olympics – Women's 100 metres hurdles =

Women's 100 metres hurdles at the Games of the XXVI Olympiad
- Venue: Centennial Olympic Stadium
- Dates: 29 July 1996 (heats and quarter-finals); 31 July 1996 (semi-finals and final)
- Competitors: 44 from 30 nations
- Winning time: 12.58

Medalists
1st place, gold medalist(s)		Ludmila Engquist; Sweden
2nd place, silver medalist(s)		Brigita Bukovec; Slovenia
3rd place, bronze medalist(s)		Patricia Girard; France

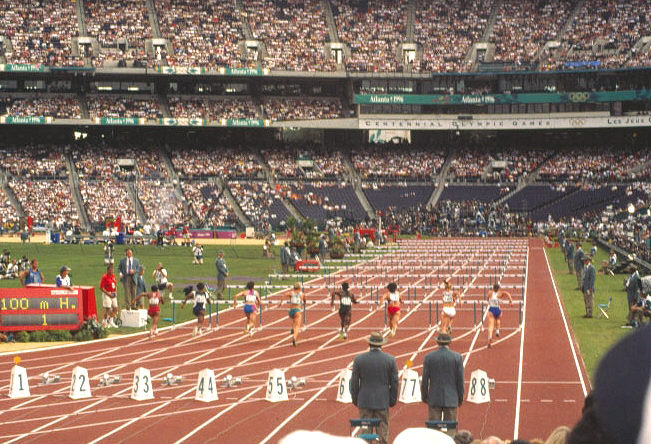

These are the official results of the Women's 100 metres Hurdles at the 1996 Summer Olympics in Atlanta. There were a total of 44 competitors.

== Medalists ==
Gold	Ludmila Engquist; Sweden
Silver	Brigita Bukovec; Slovenia
Bronze	Patricia Girard; France

== Results ==
=== Heats ===
Rank	Heat	Athlete	Nation	Time	Notes
1	3	Ludmila Engquist	Sweden	12.66	Q
2	5	Brigita Bukovec	Slovenia	12.72	Q
3	6	Gail Devers	United States	12.73	Q
4	2	Michelle Freeman	Jamaica	12.76	Q
5	5	Dione Rose	Jamaica	12.81	Q
6	2	Patricia Girard-Leno	France	12.84	Q
7	6	Gillian Russell	Jamaica	12.85	Q
8	1	Katie Anderson	Canada	12.86	Q
8	4	Julie Baumann	Switzerland	12.86	Q
10	3	Angela Atede	Nigeria	12.88	Q
11	2	Nicole Ramalalanirina	Madagascar	12.90	Q
12	3	María José Mardomingo	Spain	12.91	Q
13	1	Cheryl Dickey	United States	12.92	Q
13	2	Svetla Dimitrova	Bulgaria	12.92	Q
15	4	Angela Thorp	Great Britain	12.93	Q
16	6	Yuliya Graudyn	Russia	12.95	Q
17	4	Lynda Goode	United States	12.97	Q
18	4	Kristin Patzwahl	Germany	12.98	Q
19	4	Tatyana Reshetnikova	Russia	13.01	q
20	4	Cécile Cinélu	France	13.05	q
21	1	Aliuska López	Cuba	13.06	Q
21	5	Taiwo Aladefa	Nigeria	13.06	Q
23	1	Sriyani Kulawansa	Sri Lanka	13.09	Q
24	6	Ime Akpan	Nigeria	13.11	Q
25	3	Monique Tourret	France	13.12	Q
26	3	Lena Solli Reimann	Norway	13.13	q
27	1	Birgit Wolf	Germany	13.16	q
27	3	Nataliya Grygoryeva	Ukraine	13.16	q
29	5	Lidiya Yurkova	Belarus	13.20	Q
30	5	Nadiya Bodrova	Ukraine	13.22	q
31	6	Olena Ovcharova	Ukraine	13.23	q
32	1	Jacqui Agyepong	Great Britain	13.24	
33	3	Sonia Paquette	Canada	13.29	
34	2	Yvonne Kanazawa	Japan	13.30	
35	2	Vida Nsiah	Ghana	13.34	
36	6	Véronique Linster	Luxembourg	13.47	
37	2	Lesley Tashlin	Canada	13.61	
38	1	Chan Sau Ying	Hong Kong	13.63	
39	4	Vũ Bích Hường	Vietnam	13.85	
40	5	Rachel Rogers	Fiji	14.07	
41	4	Aminata Camara	Mali	14.94	
	5	Elisabeta Anghel	Romania	DNF	
	6	Carla Tuzzi	Italy	DNF	
	1	Nataliya Shekhodanova	Russia	DQ	Doping

=== Quarterfinals ===
Rank	Heat	Athlete	Nation	Time	Notes
1	2	Ludmila Engquist	Sweden	12.47	Q
2	3	Michelle Freeman	Jamaica	12.57	Q
3	1	Brigita Bukovec	Slovenia	12.66	Q
4	2	Aliuska López	Cuba	12.67	Q
5	2	Patricia Girard-Leno	France	12.72	Q
6	1	Dione Rose	Jamaica	12.76	Q
7	1	Yuliya Graudyn	Russia	12.77	Q
8	2	Lynda Goode	United States	12.78	Q
9	2	Gillian Russell	Jamaica	12.78	
10	4	Gail Devers	United States	12.83	Q
11	1	Svetla Dimitrova	Bulgaria	12.84	Q
12	1	Angela Atede	Nigeria	12.85	
13	3	Nicole Ramalalanirina	Madagascar	12.90	Q
14	3	Kristin Patzwahl	Germany	12.91	Q
15	3	Sriyani Kulawansa	Sri Lanka	12.91	
16	3	Cheryl Dickey	United States	12.92	
17	3	Nataliya Grygoryeva	Ukraine	12.96	
18	4	Julie Baumann	Switzerland	12.98	Q
19	4	Angela Thorp	Great Britain	12.99	Q
20	2	Tatyana Reshetnikova	Russia	13.01	
21	2	Ime Akpan	Nigeria	13.02	
22	4	María José Mardomingo	Spain	13.05	Q
23	1	Cécile Cinélu	France	13.06	
24	1	Lidiya Yurkova	Belarus	13.07	
25	4	Birgit Wolf	Germany	13.08	
26	4	Taiwo Aladefa	Nigeria	13.11	
27	2	Olena Ovcharova	Ukraine	13.16	
28	3	Katie Anderson	Canada	13.17	
28	4	Monique Tourret	France	13.17	
30	4	Lena Solli Reimann	Norway	13.30	
	1	Nadiya Bodrova	Ukraine	DNF	
	3	Natalya Shekhodanova	Russia	DQ	Doping

=== Semi finals ===
Rank	Athlete	Nation	Time	Lane	Notes
1	Michelle Freeman	Jamaica	12.61	5	Q
2	Brigita Bukovec	Slovenia	12.63	4	Q
3	Lynda Tolbert-Goode	United States	12.77	2	Q
4	Angie Thorp	Great Britain	12.80	8	
5	Julie Baumann	Switzerland	12.90	6	
6	Nicole Ramalalanirina	Madagascar	13.01	1	
7	Kristin Patzwahl	Germany	13.05	7	
—	Natalya Shekhodanova	Russia	12.67	3	DSQ

Rank	Athlete	Nation	Time	Lane	Notes
1	Ludmila Engquist	Sweden	12.51	5	Q
2	Patricia Girard	France	12.59	2	Q
3	Gail Devers	United States	12.62	6	Q
4	Dione Rose	Jamaica	12.64	3	Q
5	Aliuska López	Cuba	12.70	4	
6	Yuliya Graudyn	Russia	12.74	7	
7	María José Mardomingo	Spain	12.89	1	
—	Svetla Dimitrova	Bulgaria	DNF	8	

=== Final ===
Rank	Athlete	Nation	Time	Lane	Notes
1st place, gold medalist(s)	Ludmila Engquist	Sweden	12.58	6	
2nd place, silver medalist(s)	Brigita Bukovec	Slovenia	12.59	3	
3rd place, bronze medalist(s)	Patricia Girard	France	12.65	5	
4	Gail Devers	United States	12.66	8	
5	Dione Rose	Jamaica	12.74	2	
6	Michelle Freeman	Jamaica	12.76	4	
7	Lynda Tolbert-Goode	United States	13.11	1	
—	Natalya Shekhodanova	Russia	12.80	7	DSQ

== See also ==
- Men's 110m Hurdles
- Women's 400m Hurdles
