= 1994 European Athletics Indoor Championships – Women's 60 metres hurdles =

The women's 60 metres hurdles event at the 1994 European Athletics Indoor Championships was held in Palais Omnisports de Paris-Bercy on 13 March.

== Medalists ==
Gold	Silver	Bronze
Yordanka Donkova; Bulgaria	Eva Sokolova; Russia	Anne Piquereau; France

== Results ==
=== Heats ===
First 2 from each heat (Q) and the next 4 fastest (q) qualified for the semifinals.

Rank	Heat	Name	Nationality	Time	Notes
1	4	Brigita Bukovec	Slovenia	7.96	Q, NR
2	4	Yordanka Donkova	Bulgaria	7.97	Q
3	2	Eva Sokolova	Russia	7.98	Q
4	1	Anne Piquereau	France	8.00	Q
5	2	Carla Tuzzi	Italy	8.04	Q
6	2	Monica Grefstad	Norway	8.06	q, NR
7	3	Patricia Girard	France	8.09	Q
8	2	Cécile Cinèlu	France	8.11	q
9	1	Caren Jung	Germany	8.12	Q
10	1	Svetlana Laukhova	Russia	8.15	q
10	3	Svetla Dimitrova	Bulgaria	8.15	Q
12	1	Samantha Farquharson	Great Britain	8.17	q
12	3	Liliana Năstase	Romania	8.17	
14	3	Sylvia Dethiér	Belgium	8.20	
15	4	Nadezhda Bodrova	Ukraine	8.22	
16	3	Clova Court	Great Britain	8.24	
17	4	Regina Ahlke	Germany	8.27	
18	2	Caroline Delplancke	Belgium	8.28	
19	1	Elizabeta Pavlovska	Macedonia	8.64	
	4	Ludmila Olijare	Latvia	DNF	
	3	Marina Damceska	Macedonia	DNS	

=== Semifinals ===
First 3 from each semifinal qualified directly (Q) for the final.

Rank	Heat	Name	Nationality	Time	Notes
1	2	Anne Piquereau	France	7.94	Q
2	1	Yordanka Donkova	Bulgaria	7.95	Q
2	2	Eva Sokolova	Russia	7.95	Q
4	2	Carla Tuzzi	Italy	7.97	Q, NR
5	1	Patricia Girard	France	8.03	Q
5	2	Cécile Cinèlu	France	8.03	
7	1	Brigita Bukovec	Slovenia	8.09	Q
8	1	Samantha Farquharson	Great Britain	8.11	
9	1	Monica Grefstad	Norway	8.12	
10	2	Svetla Dimitrova	Bulgaria	8.14	
11	1	Svetlana Laukhova	Russia	8.15	
12	2	Caren Jung	Germany	8.41	

=== Final ===
Rank	Lane	Name	Nationality	Time	Notes
1st place, gold medalist(s)	3	Yordanka Donkova	Bulgaria	7.85	
2nd place, silver medalist(s)	4	Eva Sokolova	Russia	7.89	
3rd place, bronze medalist(s)	5	Anne Piquereau	France	7.91	
4	6	Brigita Bukovec	Slovenia	7.94	NR
5	2	Carla Tuzzi	Italy	7.97	=NR
6	1	Patricia Girard	France	7.98	
