= 1994 in the sport of athletics =

1994 in athletics
- Major world events: World Championships; World Indoor Championships
- IAAF Athletes of the Year: Noureddine Morceli; Jackie Joyner-Kersee

This article contains an overview of the year 1994 in athletics.

== International events ==
- Asian Games
- Balkan Games
- Commonwealth Games
- European Championships
- European Indoor Championships
- Jeux de la Francophonie
- Goodwill Games
- World Cross Country Championships
- World Junior Championships

== World records ==
=== Men ===
EVENT	ATHLETE	MARK	DATE	VENUE
100 metres	Leroy Burrell (USA)	9.85	6 July	Lausanne, Switzerland
3,000 metres	Noureddine Morceli (ALG)	7:25.11	2 August	Monte Carlo
5,000 metres	Haile Gebrselassie (ETH)	12:56.96	4 June	Hengelo, Netherlands
10,000 metres	William Sigei (KEN)	26:52.23	22 July	Oslo, Norway
4 × 200 m Relay	Santa Monica United States (USA) • Michael Marsh • Leroy Burrell • Floyd Heard • Carl Lewis	1:18.68	17 April	Walnut, United States
Pole vault	Sergei Bubka (UKR)	6.14m	31 July	Sestriere, Italy

=== Women ===
EVENT	ATHLETE	MARK	DATE	VENUE
2,000 metres	Sonia O'Sullivan (IRL)	5:25.36	8 July	Edinburgh, Great Britain
Pole vault	Sun Caiyun (CHN)	4.12m	22 October	Guangzhou, China
Hammer throw	Olga Kuzenkova (RUS)	66.84	23 February	Adler, Russia

- Uta Pippig (GER) equals the world record in the women's Half Marathon held by South Africa's Elana Meyer since 1991-05-18, clocking 1:07:59 on 1994-03-20 in Kyoto, Japan.

== Awards ==
=== Men ===
1994 TRACK & FIELD AWARDS	ATHLETE
IAAF World Athlete of the Year	Noureddine Morceli (ALG)
Track & Field Athlete of the Year	Noureddine Morceli (ALG)
European Athlete of the Year Award	Colin Jackson (GBR)
Best Male Track Athlete ESPY Award	Michael Johnson (USA)

=== Women ===
1994 TRACK & FIELD AWARDS	ATHLETE
IAAF World Athlete of the Year	Jackie Joyner-Kersee (USA)
Track & Field Athlete of the Year	Jackie Joyner-Kersee (USA)
European Athlete of the Year Award	Irina Privalova (RUS)
Best Female Track Athlete ESPY Award	Gail Devers (USA)

== Men's Best Year Performers ==
=== 100 metres ===
RANK	1994 WORLD BEST PERFORMERS	TIME
1.	Leroy Burrell (USA)	9.85
2.	Linford Christie (GBR)	9.91
3.	Davidson Ezinwa (NGR)	9.94
3.	Dennis Mitchell (USA)	9.94
5.	Olapade Adeniken (NGR)	9.95

=== 200 metres ===
RANK	1994 WORLD BEST PERFORMERS	TIME
1.	John Regis (GBR)	19.87
2.	Michael Johnson (USA)	19.94
3.	Frank Fredericks (NAM)	19.97
4.	Daniel Effiong (NGR)	20.10
5.	Jeff Williams (USA)	20.19

=== 400 metres ===
RANK	1994 WORLD BEST PERFORMERS	TIME
1.	Michael Johnson (USA)	43.90
2.	Samson Kitur (KEN)	44.32
3.	Antonio Pettigrew (USA)	44.43
4.	Derek Mills (USA)	44.59
5.	Steve Lewis (USA)	44.68

=== 800 metres ===
RANK	1994 WORLD BEST PERFORMERS	TIME
1.	Benson Koech (KEN)	1:43.17
2.	Wilson Kipketer (KEN)	1:43.29
3.	Vebjørn Rodal (NOR)	1:43.50
4.	Johnny Gray (USA)	1:43.73
5.	David Singoei (KEN)	1:44.07

=== 1,500 metres ===
RANK	1994 WORLD BEST PERFORMERS	TIME
1.	Noureddine Morceli (ALG)	3:30.61
2.	Vénuste Niyongabo (BDI)	3:30.66
3.	Azzedine Sediki (MAR)	3:32.71
4.	Mohamed Suleiman (QAT)	3:32.73
5.	Hicham El Guerrouj (MAR)	3:33.61

=== Mile ===
RANK	1994 WORLD BEST PERFORMERS	TIME
1.	Noureddine Morceli (ALG)	3:48.67
2.	Vénuste Niyongabo (BDI)	3:48.94
3.	Abdi Bile (SOM)	3:50.67
4.	Steve Holman (USA)	3:50.91
5.	Mohamed Suleiman (QAT)	3:51.31

=== 3,000 metres ===
RANK	1994 WORLD BEST PERFORMERS	TIME
1.	Noureddine Morceli (ALG)	7:25.11
2.	Paul Bitok (KEN)	7:34.36
3.	Dieter Baumann (GER)	7:34.69
4.	Aloys Nizigama (BDI)	7:35.08
5.	Moses Kiptanui (KEN)	7:35.23

=== 5,000 metres ===
RANK	1994 WORLD BEST PERFORMERS	TIME
1.	Haile Gebrselassie (ETH)	12:56.96
2.	Khalid Skah (MAR)	13:00.54
3.	Bob Kennedy (USA)	13:02.93
4.	Brahim Lahlafi (MAR)	13:03.36
5.	Noureddine Morceli (ALG)	13:03.85

=== 10,000 metres ===
RANK	1994 WORLD BEST PERFORMERS	TIME
1.	William Sigei (KEN)	26:52.23
2.	Haile Gebrselassie (ETH)	27:15.00
3.	William Kiptum Muigei (KEN)	27:17.20
4.	Armando Quintanilla (MEX)	27:18.59
5.	Aloys Nizigama (BDI)	27:20.51

=== Half Marathon ===
RANK	1994 WORLD BEST PERFORMERS	TIME
1.	Benson Masya (KEN)	1:00:02

=== Marathon ===
RANK	1994 WORLD BEST PERFORMERS	TIME
1.	Cosmas Ndeti (KEN)	2:07:15
2.	Andres Espinosa (MEX)	2:07:19
3.	Vincent Rousseau (BEL)	2:07:51
4.	Jackson Kipngok (KEN)	2:08:08
5.	Hwang Young-Cho (KOR)	2:08:09

=== 110 m Hurdles ===
RANK	1994 WORLD BEST PERFORMERS	TIME
1.	Colin Jackson (GBR)	12.98
2.	Mark Crear (USA)	13.07
3.	Mark McKoy (AUT)	13.14
4.	Florian Schwarthoff (GER)	13.16
5.	Tony Jarrett (GBR)	13.22

=== 400 m Hurdles ===
RANK	1994 WORLD BEST PERFORMERS	TIME
1.	Derrick Adkins (USA)	47.70
2.	Samuel Matete (ZAM)	47.90
3.	Winthrop Graham (JAM)	48.05
4.	Oleg Tverdokhleb (UKR)	48.06
5.	Danny Harris (USA)	48.18

=== 3000 m Steeplechase ===
RANK	1994 WORLD BEST PERFORMERS	TIME
1.	Moses Kiptanui (KEN)	8:08.80
2.	Richard Kosgei (KEN)	8:10.20
3.	Mark Croghan (USA)	8:10.56
4.	Eliud Barngetuny (KEN)	8:10.84
5.	Abdelaziz Sahere (MAR)	8:11.11

=== High jump ===
RANK	1994 WORLD BEST PERFORMERS	HEIGHT
1.	Javier Sotomayor (CUB)	2.42
2.	Troy Kemp (BAH)	2.35
2.	Steinar Hoen (NOR)	2.35
4.	Dalton Grant (GBR)	2.34
5.	Tim Forsyth (AUS)	2.33
5.	Jean-Charles Gicquel (FRA)	2.33
5.	Artur Partyka (POL)	2.33
5.	Steve Smith (GBR)	2.33
5.	Gilmar Mayo (COL)	2.33

=== Long jump ===
RANK	1994 WORLD BEST PERFORMERS	DISTANCE
1.	Erick Walder (USA)	8.74
2.	Carl Lewis (USA)	8.66
3.	Kareem Streete-Thompson (USA)	8.63
4.	Mike Powell (USA)	8.58
5.	Roland McGhee (USA)	8.47

=== Triple jump ===
RANK	1994 WORLD BEST PERFORMERS	DISTANCE
1.	Mike Conley (USA)	17.68
2.	Denis Kapustin (RUS)	17.62
3.	Yoelbi Quesada (CUB)	17.61
4.	Serge Hélan (FRA)	17.55
5.	Vasiliy Sokov (RUS)	17.43
5.	Kenny Harrison (USA)	17.43

=== Discus ===
RANK	1994 WORLD BEST PERFORMERS	DISTANCE
1.	Attila Horváth (HUN)	68.58
2.	Jürgen Schult (GER)	66.08
2.	Lars Riedel (GER)	66.08
4.	Nick Sweeney (IRL)	66.00
5.	Vladimir Dubrovshchik (BLR)	65.80

=== Shot put ===
RANK	1994 WORLD BEST PERFORMERS	DISTANCE
1.	Jim Doehring (USA)	21.09
2.	Kevin Toth (USA)	21.07
3.	Oleksandr Bagach (UKR)	21.05
4.	Cottrell John Hunter (USA)	20.94
4.	Yevgeniy Palchikov (RUS)	20.94

=== Hammer ===
RANK	1994 WORLD BEST PERFORMERS	DISTANCE
1.	Andrey Abduvaliyev (UZB)	83.36
2.	Igor Astapkovich (BLR)	83.14
3.	Lance Deal (USA)	82.50
4.	Vasiliy Sidorenko (RUS)	82.02
5.	Andrey Skvaruk (UKR)	81.72

=== Javelin (new design) ===
RANK	1994 WORLD BEST PERFORMERS	DISTANCE
1.	Jan Železný (CZE)	91.82
2.	Raymond Hecht (GER)	90.06
3.	Andrey Moruyev (RUS)	87.34
4.	Patrik Bodén (SWE)	86.76
5.	Mick Hill (GBR)	86.36

=== Pole vault ===
RANK	1994 WORLD BEST PERFORMERS	HEIGHT
1.	Sergei Bubka (UKR)	6.14
2.	Rodion Gataullin (RUS)	6.00
3.	Scott Huffman (USA)	5.97
4.	Jean Galfione (FRA)	5.94
5.	Dean Starkey (USA)	5.92

=== Decathlon ===
RANK	1994 WORLD BEST PERFORMERS	POINTS
1.	Eduard Hämäläinen (BLR)	8735
2.	Dan O'Brien (USA)	8715
3.	Steve Fritz (USA)	8548
4.	Christian Plaziat (FRA)	8505
5.	Alain Blondel (FRA)	8453

== Women's Best Year Performers ==
=== 60 metres ===
RANK	1994 WORLD BEST PERFORMERS	TIME
1.	Irina Privalova (RUS)	6.93
2.	Merlene Ottey (JAM)	6.99
3.	Gail Devers (USA)	7.00
4.	Olga Bogoslovskaya (RUS)	7.06
5.	Gwen Torrence (USA)	7.10

=== 100 metres ===
RANK	1994 WORLD BEST PERFORMERS	TIME
1.	Irina Privalova (RUS)	10.77
2.	Merlene Ottey (JAM)	10.78
3.	Gwen Torrence (USA)	10.82
4.	Zhanna Block (UKR)	10.99
5.	Juliet Cuthbert (JAM)	11.01

=== 200 metres ===
RANK	1994 WORLD BEST PERFORMERS	TIME
1.	Gwen Torrence (USA)	21.85
2.	Irina Privalova (RUS)	22.02
3.	Merlene Ottey (JAM)	22.07
4.	Cathy Freeman (AUS)	22.25
5.	Galina Malchugina (RUS)	22.29
5.	Dannette Young (USA)	22.29

=== 400 metres ===
RANK	1994 WORLD BEST PERFORMERS	TIME
1.	Marie-José Pérec (FRA)	49.77
2.	Cathy Freeman (AUS)	50.04
3.	Maicel Malone (USA)	50.05
4.	Jearl Miles (USA)	50.11
5.	Renee Poetschka (AUS)	50.19

=== 800 metres ===
RANK	1994 WORLD BEST PERFORMERS	TIME
1.	Maria de Lurdes Mutola (MOZ)	1:55.19
2.	Lyubov Gurina (RUS)	1:56.53
3.	Natalya Dukhnova (BLR)	1:57.87
4.	Patricia Djaté (FRA)	1:58.07
5.	Luciana Mendes (BRA)	1:58.27

=== 1,500 metres ===
RANK	1994 WORLD BEST PERFORMERS	TIME
1.	Sonia O'Sullivan (IRL)	3:59.10
2.	Yekaterina Podkopayeva (RUS)	3:59.78
3.	Qu Yunxia (CHN)	4:00.34
4.	Lyubov Kremlyova (RUS)	4:01.05
4.	Hassiba Boulmerka (ALG)	4:01.05

=== Mile ===
RANK	1994 WORLD BEST PERFORMERS	TIME
1.	Sonia O'Sullivan (IRL)	4:17.25
2.	Hassiba Boulmerka (ALG)	4:22.09
3.	Yvonne Murray (GBR)	4:22.64
4.	Lyudmila Rogachova (RUS)	4:23.88
5.	Yvonne Graham (JAM)	4:24.64

=== 3,000 metres ===
RANK	1994 WORLD BEST PERFORMERS	TIME
1.	Sonia O'Sullivan (IRL)	8:21.64
2.	Yvonne Murray (GBR)	8:29.60
3.	Angela Chalmers (CAN)	8:32.17
4.	Gabriela Szabo (ROM)	8:40.08
5.	Olga Churbanova (RUS)	8:40.48

=== 5,000 metres ===
RANK	1994 WORLD BEST PERFORMERS	TIME
1.	Yelena Romanova (RUS)	15:05.94
2.	Sonia O'Sullivan (IRL)	15:06.18
3.	Fernanda Ribeiro (POR)	15:06.91
4.	Catherina McKiernan (IRL)	15:09.10
5.	Alison Wyeth (GBR)	15:10.38

=== 10,000 metres ===
RANK	1994 WORLD BEST PERFORMERS	TIME
1.	Wang Junxia (CHN)	30:50.34
2.	Elana Meyer (RSA)	30:52.51
3.	Fernanda Ribeiro (POR)	31:04.25
4.	Catherina McKiernan (IRL)	31:19.11
5.	Dong Li (CHN)	31:31.08

=== Half Marathon ===
RANK	1994 WORLD BEST PERFORMERS	TIME
1.	Uta Pippig (GER)	1:07:59

=== Marathon ===
RANK	1994 WORLD BEST PERFORMERS	TIME
1.	Uta Pippig (GER)	2:21:45
2.	Valentina Yegorova (RUS)	2:23:33
3.	Elana Meyer (RSA)	2:25:15
3.	Katrin Dörre (GER)	2:25:15
5.	Alena Peterkova (CZE)	2:25:19

=== 60 metres hurdles ===
RANK	1994 WORLD BEST PERFORMERS	TIME
1.	Yordanka Donkova (BUL)	7.83
2.	Gail Devers (USA)	7.85
3.	Eva Sokolova (RUS)	7.89
4.	Michelle Freeman (JAM)	7.90
5.	Anne Piquereau (FRA)	7.91

=== 100 m Hurdles ===
RANK	1994 WORLD BEST PERFORMERS	TIME
1.	Tatyana Reshetnikova (RUS)	12.53
1.	Svetla Dimitrova (BUL)	12.53
3.	Yordanka Donkova (BUL)	12.56
4.	Yuliya Graudyn (RUS)	12.62
5.	Jackie Joyner-Kersee (USA)	12.69

=== 400 m Hurdles ===
RANK	1994 WORLD BEST PERFORMERS	TIME
1.	Sally Gunnell (GBR)	53.33
2.	Kim Batten (USA)	53.72
3.	Anna Knoroz (RUS)	54.11
4.	Deon Hemmings (JAM)	54.48
5.	Heike Meißner (GER)	54.52

=== High Jump ===
RANK	1994 WORLD BEST PERFORMERS	HEIGHT
1.	Silvia Costa (CUB)	2.00 m
1.	Inga Babakova (UKR)	2.00 m
1.	Britta Bilač (SLO)	2.00 m
4.	Yelena Gulyayeva (RUS)	1.98 m
4.	Yevgeniya Zhdanova (RUS)	1.98 m
4.	Alison Inverarity (AUS)	1.98 m

=== Long Jump ===
RANK	1994 WORLD BEST PERFORMERS	DISTANCE
1.	Jackie Joyner-Kersee (USA)	7.49 m
2.	Heike Drechsler (GER)	7.29 m
3.	Irina Mushailova (RUS)	7.20 m
4.	Lyudmila Ninova (AUT)	7.09 m
4.	Inessa Kravets (UKR)	7.09 m

=== Triple Jump ===
RANK	1994 WORLD BEST PERFORMERS	DISTANCE
1.	Sofiya Bozhanova (BUL)	14.98 m
2.	Inna Lasovskaya (RUS)	14.94 m
3.	Inessa Kravets (UKR)	14.91 m
4.	Anna Biryukova (RUS)	14.89 m
5.	Niurka Montalvo (CUB)	14.60 m

=== Shot Put ===
RANK	1994 WORLD BEST PERFORMERS	DISTANCE
1.	Sui Xinmei (CHN)	20.74 m
2.	Valentina Fedyushina (UKR)	20.56 m
3.	Zhang Liuhong (CHN)	20.54 m
4.	Huang Zhihong (CHN)	20.08 m
5.	Astrid Kumbernuss (GER)	20.06 m

=== Javelin (old design) ===
RANK	1994 WORLD BEST PERFORMERS	DISTANCE
1.	Natalya Shikolenko (BLR)	71.40
2.	Trine Hattestad (NOR)	71.32
3.	Karen Forkel (GER)	69.20
4.	Claudia Isaila (ROM)	6.56
5.	Felicia Tilea-Moldovan (ROM)	66.40

=== Heptathlon ===
RANK	1994 WORLD BEST PERFORMERS	POINTS
1.	Heike Drechsler (GER)	6741
2.	Sabine Braun (GER)	6665
3.	Jackie Joyner-Kersee (USA)	6606
4.	Svetlana Moskalets (RUS)	6598
5.	Larisa Nikitina (RUS)	6596

== Deaths ==
- September 23 – Antanas Mikėnas (70), Soviet-Lithuanian racewalker (b. 1924)
