= 1997 IAAF World Indoor Championships – Women's 60 metres hurdles =

The women's 60 metres hurdles event at the 1997 IAAF World Indoor Championships was held on March 8–9.

== Medalists ==
Gold	Silver	Bronze
Michelle Freeman; Jamaica	Gillian Russell; Jamaica	Cheryl Dickey; United States; Patricia Girard; France

== Results ==
=== Heats ===
The first 2 of each heat (Q) and next 2 fastest (q) qualified for the semifinals.

Rank	Heat	Name	Nationality	Time	Notes
1	1	Michelle Freeman	Jamaica	7.88	Q
1	4	Gillian Russell	Jamaica	7.88	Q, PB
3	2	Patricia Girard	France	7.99	Q
4	5	Brigita Bukovec	Slovenia	8.02	Q
5	1	Keturah Anderson	Canada	8.05	Q
5	3	Cheryl Dickey	United States	8.05	Q
7	5	Lidiya Yurkova	Belarus	8.07	Q
8	2	Melissa Morrison	United States	8.08	Q
9	2	Vida Nsiah	Ghana	8.11	q
9	3	Caren Sonn	Germany	8.11	Q
11	3	Monica Grefstad	Norway	8.16	q, SB
12	3	Natalya Grigoryeva	Ukraine	8.17	
13	2	Clova Court	Great Britain	8.18	SB
14	4	Yvonne Kanazawa	Japan	8.24	Q
15	5	Svetlana Laukhova	Russia	8.25	
16	1	Cécile Aholu	France	8.27	
16	4	Olena Ovcharova	Ukraine	8.27	
18	4	Aliuska López	Cuba	8.31	
19	1	Elke Wölfling	Austria	8.35	
19	3	Naoko Kobayashi	Japan	8.35	
21	5	Véronique Linster	Luxembourg	8.37	
22	2	Zhou Jing	China	8.38	
23	5	Maryline Troonen	Belgium	8.41	
24	1	Irina Korotya	Russia	8.57	
25	4	Hsu Hsiu-Ying	Chinese Taipei	8.62	
26	2	Aminata Camara	Mali	9.08	
27	4	Zhanna Sokolova	Tajikistan	9.39	

=== Semifinals ===
First 3 of each semifinal (Q) qualified directly for the final.

Rank	Heat	Name	Nationality	Time	Notes
1	2	Patricia Girard	France	7.88	Q, SB
2	2	Cheryl Dickey	United States	7.89	Q, PB
3	1	Gillian Russell	Jamaica	7.90	Q
4	1	Melissa Morrison	United States	7.91	Q, PB
5	1	Keturah Anderson	Canada	7.93	Q, NR
5	1	Brigita Bukovec	Slovenia	7.93	
7	2	Michelle Freeman	Jamaica	8.01	Q
8	2	Vida Nsiah	Ghana	8.03	
9	1	Caren Sonn	Germany	8.15	
10	2	Lidiya Yurkova	Belarus	8.17	
11	2	Yvonne Kanazawa	Japan	8.30	
12	1	Monica Grefstad	Norway	8.31	

=== Final ===
Rank	Name	Nationality	Time	Notes
1st place, gold medalist(s)	Michelle Freeman	Jamaica	7.82	=CR
2nd place, silver medalist(s)	Gillian Russell	Jamaica	7.84	PB
3rd place, bronze medalist(s)	Cheryl Dickey	United States	7.84	PB
3rd place, bronze medalist(s)	Patricia Girard	France	7.84	SB
5	Melissa Morrison	United States	7.88	PB
6	Keturah Anderson	Canada	8.02	
