= 1995 IAAF World Indoor Championships – Women's 60 metres hurdles =

The women's 60 metres hurdles event at the 1995 IAAF World Indoor Championships was held on 11–12 March.

== Medalists ==
Gold	Silver	Bronze
Aliuska López; Cuba	Olga Shishigina; Kazakhstan	Brigita Bukovec; Slovenia

== Results ==
=== Heats ===
First 3 of each heat (Q) and next 4 fastest (q) qualified for the semifinals.

Rank	Heat	Name	Nationality	Time	Notes
1	3	Olga Shishigina	Kazakhstan	7.95	Q
2	3	Monique Tourret	France	8.00	Q
3	4	Patricia Girard	France	8.01	Q
4	3	Julie Baumann	Switzerland	8.04	Q
5	1	Brigita Bukovec	Slovenia	8.05	Q
6	4	Michelle Freeman	Jamaica	8.06	Q
7	2	Aliuska López	Cuba	8.08	Q
8	2	Nicole Ramalalanirina	Madagascar	8.09	Q
8	4	Jackie Agyepong	Great Britain	8.09	Q
10	1	Carla Tuzzi	Italy	8.10	Q
11	3	Dionne Rose	Jamaica	8.13	q
12	4	Zhou Hongyan	China	8.15	q
13	3	Cheryl Dickey	United States	8.19	q
14	1	Monica Grefstad	Norway	8.20	Q
15	1	Aleksandra Paskhina	Russia	8.21	q
15	4	Samantha Farquharson	Great Britain	8.21	
17	1	Angela Coon	Canada	8.23	
18	1	Regina Ahlke	Germany	8.25	
19	2	Yelena Sukhoruchenko	Ukraine	8.27	Q
20	2	Liliana Năstase	Romania	8.28	
21	2	Jane Flemming	Australia	8.29	
22	2	Caren Jung	Germany	8.29	
23	2	Lynda Tolbert-Goode	United States	8.31	
24	3	Marica Erica Niculae	Romania	8.37	
24	3	Iveta Rudová	Czech Republic	8.37	
24	4	Odalys Adams	Cuba	8.37	
27	1	Chan Sau Ying	Hong Kong	8.46	
27	4	Isabel Abrantes	Portugal	8.46	
	1	Elke Wölfling	Austria	DQ	R162.7
	2	Ana Barrenechea	Spain	DNF	

=== Semifinals ===
First 4 of each semifinal qualified directly (Q) for the final.

Rank	Heat	Name	Nationality	Time	Notes
1	1	Aliuska López	Cuba	7.91	Q
2	1	Olga Shishigina	Kazakhstan	7.91	Q
3	2	Brigita Bukovec	Slovenia	7.94	Q
4	1	Monique Tourret	France	8.01	Q
5	2	Jackie Agyepong	Great Britain	8.02	Q
6	1	Cheryl Dickey	United States	8.03	Q
7	1	Dionne Rose	Jamaica	8.04	
8	2	Patricia Girard	France	8.06	Q
9	2	Michelle Freeman	Jamaica	8.07	Q
10	2	Monica Grefstad	Norway	8.09	
11	1	Julie Baumann	Switzerland	8.10	
12	2	Nicole Ramalalanirina	Madagascar	8.11	
13	1	Carla Tuzzi	Italy	8.16	
14	2	Zhou Hongyan	China	8.23	
15	2	Aleksandra Paskhina	Russia	8.25	
16	1	Yelena Sukhoruchenko	Ukraine	8.28	

=== Final ===
Rank	Name	Nationality	Time	Notes
1st place, gold medalist(s)	Aliuska López	Cuba	7.92	
2nd place, silver medalist(s)	Olga Shishigina	Kazakhstan	7.92	
3rd place, bronze medalist(s)	Brigita Bukovec	Slovenia	7.93	
4	Monique Tourret	France	7.98	
5	Jackie Agyepong	Great Britain	8.01	
6	Cheryl Dickey	United States	8.19	
7	Michelle Freeman	Jamaica	8.21	
	Patricia Girard	France	DNF	
