= 1993 IAAF World Indoor Championships – Women's 60 metres hurdles =

The women's 60 metres hurdles event at the 1993 IAAF World Indoor Championships was held on 14 March.

== Medalists ==
Gold	Silver	Bronze
Julie Baumann; Switzerland	LaVonna Martin-Floreal; United States	Patricia Girard; France

== Results ==
=== Heats ===
First 3 of each heat (Q) and next 4 fastest (q) qualified for the semifinals.

Rank	Heat	Name	Nationality	Time	Notes
1	3	Michelle Freeman	Jamaica	8.04	Q
2	4	Yuliya Graudyn	Russia	8.10	Q
3	2	Julie Baumann	Switzerland	8.11	Q
4	1	LaVonna Martin-Floreal	United States	8.13	Q
5	2	Patricia Girard	France	8.15	Q
6	4	Jackie Agyepong	Great Britain	8.17	Q
7	4	Aliuska López	Cuba	8.18	Q
8	4	Sylvia Dethier	Belgium	8.22	q
9	2	Brigita Bukovec	Slovenia	8.23	Q
9	3	Rita Schönenberger	Switzerland	8.23	Q
9	4	Dawn Bowles	United States	8.23	q
12	3	Birgit Wolf	Germany	8.24	Q
13	2	Caren Jung	Germany	8.26	q
13	4	Zhang Yu	China	8.26	q, AR
15	2	Caroline Delplancke	Belgium	8.29	
16	1	María José Mardomingo	Spain	8.31	Q
17	1	Clova Court	Great Britain	8.33	Q
18	1	Liliana Năstase	Romania	8.33	
19	1	Anne Piquereau	France	8.34	
20	3	Yelena Politika	Ukraine	8.35	
21	3	Nicole Ramalalanirina	Madagascar	8.36	
22	2	Ana Barrenechea	Spain	8.38	
23	1	Chan Sau Ying	Hong Kong	8.42	NR
24	3	Lena Solli	Norway	8.43	
24	4	Sonia Paquette	Canada	8.43	
26	1	Joyce Meléndez	Puerto Rico	8.45	NR
27	3	Angela Coon	Canada	8.46	
	2	Dionne Rose	Jamaica	DNF	

=== Semifinals ===
First 3 of each semifinal (Q) and the next 2 fastest (q) qualified for the final.

Rank	Heat	Name	Nationality	Time	Notes
1	2	Michelle Freeman	Jamaica	7.99	Q
2	2	LaVonna Martin-Floreal	United States	8.00	Q
3	1	Julie Baumann	Switzerland	8.02	Q
4	1	Yuliya Graudyn	Russia	8.02	Q
5	2	Aliuska López	Cuba	8.10	Q
6	1	Brigita Bukovec	Slovenia	8.11	Q
7	2	Patricia Girard	France	8.15	q
8	1	María José Mardomingo	Spain	8.22	q
9	1	Dawn Bowles	United States	8.23	
10	2	Caren Jung	Germany	8.27	
11	2	Rita Schönenberger	Switzerland	8.32	
12	1	Zhang Yu	China	8.38	
13	2	Clova Court	Great Britain	8.65	
14	1	Jackie Agyepong	Great Britain	8.67	
	1	Birgit Wolf	Germany	DNF	
	2	Sylvia Dethier	Belgium	DNF	

=== Final ===
Rank	Lane	Name	Nationality	Time	Notes
1st place, gold medalist(s)	6	Julie Baumann	Switzerland	7.96	
2nd place, silver medalist(s)	3	LaVonna Martin-Floreal	United States	7.99	
3rd place, bronze medalist(s)	8	Patricia Girard	France	8.01	
4	4	Yuliya Graudyn	Russia	8.01	
5	1	Aliuska López	Cuba	8.11	
6	7	María José Mardomingo	Spain	8.18	
7	2	Brigita Bukovec	Slovenia	8.28	
	5	Michelle Freeman	Jamaica	DQ	

Note: In the original final race (won by Graudyn), Michelle Freeman stumbled after the last hurdle and consequently impeded Julie Baumann. Freeman was disqualified and the race recalled. Baumann went on to win the rerun.
