= 1997 World Championships in Athletics – Women's 100 metres hurdles =

These are the results of the Women's 100 metres hurdles event at the 1997 World Championships in Athletics in Athens, Greece.

== Medalists ==
Gold	Ludmila Engquist; Sweden (SWE)
Silver	Svetla Dimitrova; Bulgaria (BUL)
Bronze	Michelle Freeman; Jamaica (JAM)

== Results ==
=== Heats ===
First 2 of each Heat (Q) and the next 7 fastest (q) qualified for the semifinals.

Rank	Heat	Name	Nationality	Time	Notes
1	1	Michelle Freeman	Jamaica	12.53	Q, NR
2	2	Ludmila Engquist	Sweden	12.62	Q
3	2	Patricia Girard	France	12.67	Q, SB
4	4	Svetla Dimitrova	Bulgaria	12.68	Q
5	4	Angela Atede	Nigeria	12.83	Q
6	3	Dionne Rose	Jamaica	12.84	Q
7	2	Svetlana Laukhova	Russia	12.88	q
8	1	Julie Baumann	Switzerland	12.91	Q, SB
9	4	Astia Walker	Jamaica	12.96	q
9	5	Keturah Anderson	Canada	12.96	Q
11	5	Brigita Bukovec	Slovenia	12.97	Q
12	1	Anjanette Kirkland	United States	12.99	Q
13	1	Heike Blassneck	Germany	13.00	q, PB
14	1	Corien Botha	South Africa	13.00	q, NR
15	3	Diane Allahgreen	Great Britain	13.03	Q
16	2	Sriyani Kulawansa	Sri Lanka	13.07	SB
16	5	Yuliya Graudyn	Russia	13.07	q SB
18	2	Angela Thorp	Great Britain	13.08	SB
19	2	Carla Tuzzi	Italy	13.10	
20	3	Dawn Bowles	United States	13.11	
20	5	Melissa Morrison	United States	13.11	
22	4	Iveta Rudová	Czech Republic	13.14	
23	2	Taiwo Aladefa-Darden	Nigeria	13.16	
24	5	Aliuska López	Cuba	13.19	
25	4	Nicole Ramalalanirina	Madagascar	13.21	SB
26	3	Nadege Joseph	France	13.23	
27	1	Aneta Sosnowska	Poland	13.28	
28	3	Irina Korotya	Russia	13.32	
29	3	Yvonne Kanazawa	Japan	13.34	
30	5	María José Mardomingo	Spain	13.42	
31	4	Johanna Halkoaho	Finland	13.52	
32	3	Christiana Tabaki	Greece	13.82	PB
33	5	Veronica De Paoli	Argentina	13.83	
34	1	Virginie Gollino	Monaco	15.26	
	4	Anna Leszczyńska-Łazor	Poland	DNF	
	1	Veronique Linster	Luxembourg	DNS	

=== Semifinals ===
First 4 of each Semifinal qualified directly (Q) for the final.

Rank	Heat	Name	Nationality	Time	Notes
1	1	Michelle Freeman	Jamaica	12.52	Q, NR
2	2	Ludmila Engquist	Sweden	12.53	Q, SB
3	2	Patricia Girard	France	12.68	Q
4	1	Svetla Dimitrova	Bulgaria	12.74	Q
5	1	Brigita Bukovec	Slovenia	12.76	Q, SB
6	1	Keturah Anderson	Canada	12.87	Q, PB
7	2	Svetlana Laukhova	Russia	12.88	Q
8	2	Dionne Rose	Jamaica	12.89	Q
9	2	Angela Atede	Nigeria	12.91	
10	2	Heike Blassneck	Germany	12.94	PB
11	1	Julie Baumann	Switzerland	12.97	
12	1	Astia Walker	Jamaica	13.00	
13	1	Anjanette Kirkland	United States	13.04	
14	1	Yuliya Graudyn	Russia	13.07	
15	2	Corien Botha	South Africa	13.12	
16	2	Diane Allahgreen	Great Britain	13.25	

=== Final ===
Wind: -0.3 m/s

Rank	Lane	Name	Nationality	Time	Notes
1st place, gold medalist(s)	5	Ludmila Engquist	Sweden	12.50	SB
2nd place, silver medalist(s)	3	Svetla Dimitrova	Bulgaria	12.58	
3rd place, bronze medalist(s)	4	Michelle Freeman	Jamaica	12.61	
4	2	Brigita Bukovec	Slovenia	12.69	SB
5	1	Dionne Rose	Jamaica	12.87	
6	8	Keturah Anderson	Canada	12.88	
7	7	Svetlana Laukhova	Russia	12.98	
	6	Patricia Girard	France	DQ	
