= 1993 World Championships in Athletics – Women's 100 metres hurdles =

These are the official results of the Women's 100 metres hurdles event at the 1993 IAAF World Championships in Stuttgart, Germany. There were a total number of 43 participating athletes, with three semi-finals and six qualifying heats and the final held on Friday August 20, 1993.

== Medalists ==
Gold	Gail Devers; United States (USA)
Silver	Marina Azyabina; Russia (RUS)
Bronze	Lynda Tolbert-Goode; United States (USA)

== Final ==
RANK	FINAL	TIME
	Gail Devers (USA)	12.46 AR
	Marina Azyabina (RUS)	12.60
	Lynda Tolbert-Goode (USA)	12.67
4.	Aliuska López (CUB)	12.73
5.	Eva Sokolova (RUS)	12.78
6.	Dawn Bowles (USA)	12.90
7.	Michelle Freeman (JAM)	12.90
8.	Cécile Cinélu (FRA)	12.95

== Semi-finals ==
- Held on Thursday 1993-08-19

RANK	HEAT 1	TIME
1.	Gail Devers (USA)	12.67
2.	Cécile Cinélu (FRA)	12.88
3.	Aliuska López (CUB)	12.92
4.	Jackie Agyepong (GBR)	13.03
5.	Kristin Patzwahl (GER)	13.07
6.	Keturah Anderson (CAN)	13.34
7.	Dionne Rose (JAM)	13.43
—	Natalya Kolovanova (UKR)	DNF

RANK	HEAT 2	TIME
1.	Marina Azyabina (RUS)	12.70
2.	Lynda Tolbert-Goode (USA)	12.76
3.	Brigita Bukovec (SLO)	12.98
4.	Patricia Girard (FRA)	13.03
5.	Gillian Russell (JAM)	13.12
6.	Nicole Ramalalanirina (MAD)	13.16
7.	Jane Flemming (AUS)	13.19
8.	Clova Court (GBR)	13.37

RANK	HEAT 3	TIME
1.	Eva Sokolova (RUS)	12.76
2.	Michelle Freeman (JAM)	12.77
3.	Dawn Bowles (USA)	12.84
4.	Svetla Dimitrova (BUL)	12.96
5.	Nadezhda Bodrova (UKR)	12.98
6.	Julie Baumann (SUI)	12.99
7.	Monica Grefstad (NOR)	13.37
8.	Marie-Victoire Preira (FRA)	13.39

== Qualifying heats ==
- Held on Thursday 1993-08-19

RANK	HEAT 1	TIME
1.	Marina Azyabina (RUS)	12.88
2.	Julie Baumann (SUI)	13.10
3.	Nadezhda Bodrova (UKR)	13.25
4.	Marie-Victoire Preira (FRA)	13.36
5.	Maria Jose Mardomingo (ESP)	13.41
6.	Sonia Paquette (CAN)	13.51
7.	Gudrún Arnardóttir (ISL)	13.96

RANK	HEAT 2	TIME
1.	Eva Sokolova (RUS)	12.96
2.	Keturah Anderson (CAN)	13.23
3.	Monica Grefstad (NOR)	13.29
4.	Gillian Russell (JAM)	13.30
5.	Liliana Nastase (ROM)	13.41
6.	Maria Kamrowska (POL)	13.44
7.	Natalya Belenkova (TKM)	14.88
8.	Ivette Sanchez (PAN)	15.30

RANK	HEAT 3	TIME
1.	Michelle Freeman (JAM)	12.84
2.	Dawn Bowles (USA)	12.89
3.	Kristin Patzwahl (GER)	12.98
4.	Brigita Bukovec (SLO)	13.05
5.	Nicole Ramalalanirina (MAD)	13.35
6.	Chan Sau Ying (HKG)	13.50
7.	Kim Seon-Jin (KOR)	13.99

RANK	HEAT 4	TIME
1.	Aliuska López (CUB)	13.04
2.	Svetla Dimitrova (BUL)	13.05
3.	Dionne Rose (JAM)	13.27
4.	Keri Maddox (GBR)	13.49
5.	Ina Langenhuisen (NED)	13.50
6.	Vania Ferreira (BRA)	14.23
–	Sabine Braun (GER)	DNS

RANK	HEAT 5	TIME
1.	Gail Devers (USA)	12.74
2.	Cécile Cinélu (FRA)	13.00
3.	Jackie Agyepong (GBR)	13.07
4.	Jane Flemming (AUS)	13.19
5.	Donalda Duprey (CAN)	13.50
6.	Ludmila Olijare (LAT)	13.50
7.	Sriyani Kulawansa-Fonseca (SRI)	13.58

RANK	HEAT 6	TIME
1.	Lynda Tolbert-Goode (USA)	12.90
2.	Patricia Girard (FRA)	13.08
3.	Clova Court (GBR)	13.26
4.	Natalya Kolovanova (UKR)	13.40
5.	Joyce Melendez (PUR)	13.41
6.	Carla Tuzzi (ITA)	13.54
7.	Manuela Marxer (LIE)	13.65

== See also ==
- 1988 Women's Olympic 100m Hurdles (Seoul)
- 1990 European World Championships 100m Hurdles (Split)
- 1991 Women's World Championships 100m Hurdles (Tokyo)
- 1992 Women's Olympic 100m Hurdles (Barcelona)
- 1994 European World Championships 100m Hurdles (Helsinki)
- 1995 Women's World Championships 100m Hurdles (Gothenburg)
