= 1995 World Championships in Athletics – Women's 100 metres hurdles =

These are the results of the Women's 100 metres hurdles event at the 1995 World Championships in Athletics in Gothenburg, Sweden.

== Medalists ==
Gold	Gail Devers; United States (USA)
Silver	Olga Shishigina; Kazakhstan (KAZ)
Bronze	Yuliya Graudyn; Russia (RUS)

== Results ==
=== Heats ===
First 2 of each heat (Q) and the next 6 fastest (q) qualified for the semifinals.

Wind:
Heat 1: -0.2 m/s, Heat 2: -0.6 m/s, Heat 3: ? m/s, Heat 4: -0.2 m/s, Heat 5: -1.0 m/s

Rank	Heat	Name	Nationality	Time	Notes
1	4	Olga Shishigina	Kazakhstan	12.80	Q
2	5	Gillian Russell	Jamaica	12.84	Q, PB
3	5	Gail Devers	United States	12.85	Q
4	3	Yuliya Graudyn	Russia	12.90	Q
5	1	Brigita Bukovec	Slovenia	12.93	Q
6	3	Patricia Girard	France	12.95	Q
7	1	Dionne Rose	Jamaica	12.97	Q
8	3	Michelle Freeman	Jamaica	12.99	q
8	5	Julie Baumann	Switzerland	12.99	q
10	3	Lidiya Yurkova	Belarus	13.00	q
11	4	Aliuska López	Cuba	13.01	Q
12	1	Anne Piquereau	France	13.05	q
13	4	Jackie Agyepong	Great Britain	13.06	q
14	2	Tatyana Reshetnikova	Russia	13.07	Q
15	2	Marsha Guialdo	United States	13.08	Q
16	4	Nicole Ramalalanirina	Madagascar	13.13	q
17	1	Caren Jung	Germany	13.13	
17	2	Monique Tourret	France	13.13	
19	5	Yelena Ovcharova	Ukraine	13.18	
20	2	Birgit Wolf	Germany	13.21	
21	5	Monica Grefstad	Norway	13.30	
22	2	María José Mardomingo	Spain	13.31	
23	1	Carla Tuzzi	Italy	13.32	
24	3	Odalys Adams	Cuba	13.33	
24	4	Doris Williams	United States	13.33	
26	4	Sriyani Kulawansa	Sri Lanka	13.45	
27	3	Heike Blaßneck	Germany	13.47	
28	1	Chan Sau Ying	Hong Kong	13.53	
29	5	Zhou Jing	China	13.61	
30	5	Veronique Linster	Luxembourg	13.74	
31	2	Isabel Abrantes	Portugal	13.77	
	2	Hsu Hsiu-Ying	Chinese Taipei	DNF	
	3	Gilda Massa	Peru	DNS	
	4	Joyce Meléndez	Puerto Rico	DNS	

=== Semifinals ===
First 4 of each heat (Q) qualified directly for the final.

Wind:
Heat 1: +0.1 m/s, Heat 2: -0.3 m/s

Rank	Heat	Name	Nationality	Time	Notes
1	1	Gail Devers	United States	12.67	Q
2	1	Gillian Russell	Jamaica	12.74	Q, NR
3	2	Olga Shishigina	Kazakhstan	12.78	Q
4	1	Yuliya Graudyn	Russia	12.82	Q
4	2	Brigita Bukovec	Slovenia	12.82	Q
6	1	Julie Baumann	Switzerland	12.86	Q
6	2	Dionne Rose	Jamaica	12.86	Q
8	1	Patricia Girard	France	12.87	
9	2	Tatyana Reshetnikova	Russia	12.88	Q
10	2	Marsha Guialdo	United States	12.91	
11	1	Lidiya Yurkova	Belarus	12.95	
12	2	Aliuska López	Cuba	12.98	
13	2	Anne Piquereau	France	13.09	
14	1	Jackie Agyepong	Great Britain	13.14	
15	1	Michelle Freeman	Jamaica	13.23	
16	2	Nicole Ramalalanirina	Madagascar	13.24	

=== Final ===
Wind: +0.2 m/s

Rank	Lane	Name	Nationality	Time	Notes
1st place, gold medalist(s)	5	Gail Devers	United States	12.68	
2nd place, silver medalist(s)	4	Olga Shishigina	Kazakhstan	12.80	
3rd place, bronze medalist(s)	8	Yuliya Graudyn	Russia	12.85	
4	2	Tatyana Reshetnikova	Russia	12.87	
5	7	Julie Baumann	Switzerland	12.95	
6	6	Gillian Russell	Jamaica	12.96	
7	1	Dionne Rose	Jamaica	12.98	
8	3	Brigita Bukovec	Slovenia	13.02	
