= Monica Grefstad =

Norwegian hurdler (born 1964)

Monica Grefstad Frøynes (née Grefstadt, born 12 October 1964) is a retired Norwegian athlete who competed mainly in the 100 metres hurdles. She represented Norway at the World Championships in 1993 and 1995, and at the World Indoor Championships in 1995 and 1997. Her personal bests of 13.09 seconds in the 100 metres hurdles (Oslo 1994) and 8.06 seconds in the 60 metres hurdles (Paris 1994), are former Norwegian records.

== Career ==
Grefstad set her first Norwegian record in the 100 metres hurdles in 1993 when clocking 13.38 seconds. After improving it six times in two seasons, the record stood until it was beaten by Lena Solli in 1995. In addition, Grefstad held the Norwegian 60 metres record from 1995 to 1996 with a time of 7.41 seconds.

Grefstad was an able sprinter and long hurdler as well. In the 1980s, representing the club Ranheim IL, Grefstad became Norwegian champion in the 400 metres hurdles in 1987 and 1988, winning silver medals in 1989 and 1991. She also took two silver and one bronze medal in the 100 metres, a silver and a bronze in the 200 metres, and became Norwegian champion in the standing long jump in 1997. In the 1990s she represented the clubs SK Vidar and IF Minerva. In her main event, the 100 metres hurdles, Grefstad became Norwegian champion in 1993, 1994 and 1997 and also took three silver and three bronze medals.

Grefstad married athletics coach, agent and meet director Ståle Jan Frøynes and settled in Vear. Their daughter Amanda Grefstad Frøynes (b. 1998) finished 11th in heptathlon at the 2016 World Junior Championships. Monica Grefstad Frøynes works as the managing director for Vestfold District of Athletics, and was in 2015 elected as the employees' representative on the Norwegian Athletics Association board of directors.

== Competition record ==
Year	Competition	Venue	Position	Event	Notes
Representing Norway
1992	European Indoor Championships	Genoa, Italy	22nd (h)	60 m hurdles	8.52
1993	World Championships	Stuttgart, Germany	20th (sf)	100 m hurdles	13.37
1994	European Indoor Championships	Paris, France	9th (sf)	60 m hurdles	8.12
1994	European Championships	Helsinki, Finland	10th (sf)	100 m hurdles	13.11
1995	World Indoor Championships	Barcelona, Spain	10th (sf)	60 m hurdles	8.09
1995	World Championships	Gothenburg, Sweden	21st (h)	100 m hurdles	13.30
1997	World Indoor Championships	Paris, France	12th (sf)	60 m hurdles	8.31
