= Athletics at the 1994 Commonwealth Games – Women's 100 metres hurdles =

Women's 100 metres hurdles at the Commonwealth Games

The women's 100 metres hurdles event at the 1994 Commonwealth Games was held at the Centennial Stadium in Victoria, British Columbia.

The winning margin was 0.02 seconds which as of 2024 remains the only time the women's 100 metres hurdles was won by less than 0.06 seconds at these games.

== Medalists ==
Gold	Silver	Bronze
Michelle Freeman; Jamaica	Jacqui Agyepong; England	Samantha Farquharson; England

== Results ==
=== Heats ===
Wind:
Heat 1: +1.0 m/s, Heat 2: +2.1 m/s

Rank	Heat	Name	Nationality	Time	Notes
1	1	Michelle Freeman	Jamaica	12.97	Q
2	2	Jacqui Agyepong	England	12.98	Q
3	2	Dionne Rose	Jamaica	13.06	Q
4	1	Samantha Farquharson	England	13.09	Q
5	2	Jane Flemming	Australia	13.21	Q
6	2	Donalda Duprey	Canada	13.22	q
7	1	Clova Court	England	13.27	Q
8	1	Lesley Tashlin	Canada	13.40	q
9	2	Leslie Estwick	Canada	13.51	
10	1	Chan Sau Ying	Hong Kong	13.94	
11	2	Mirenda Francourt	Seychelles	14.92	
12	1	Ana Liku	Tonga	15.05	
	1	Vida Nsiah	Ghana	DNF	
	1	Angela Atede	Nigeria	DNF	
	2	Lillyanne Beining	Papua New Guinea	DNS	

=== Final ===
Wind: -2.0 m/s

Rank	Lane	Name	Nationality	Time	Notes
1st place, gold medalist(s)	3	Michelle Freeman	Jamaica	13.12	
2nd place, silver medalist(s)	4	Jacqui Agyepong	England	13.14	
3rd place, bronze medalist(s)	5	Samantha Farquharson	England	13.38	
4	6	Dionne Rose	Jamaica	13.42	
5	1	Donalda Duprey	Canada	13.75	
6	2	Lesley Tashlin	Canada	13.85	
7	7	Jane Flemming	Australia	13.98	
	8	Clova Court	England	DNF	
