= Brigita Bukovec =

Slovenian hurdler (born 1970)

Medal record

Women's athletics

Representing Slovenia

Olympic Games
Silver medal – second place	1996 Atlanta	100 m hurdles

European Championships
Silver medal – second place	1998 Budapest	100 m hurdles

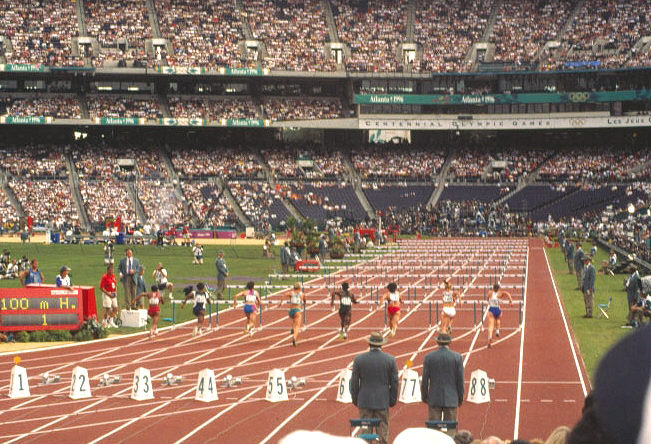
Brigita Bukovec (lane 4) at the 1996 Summer Olympics 100 m hs semi-final.

Brigita Bukovec (born 21 May 1970) is a retired Slovenian hurdler who won an Olympic silver medal in 1996. During the Olympics she set a personal best time with 12.59 seconds.

She retired from athletics at the end of the 1999 season.

== Biography ==
Bukovec was born in Ljubljana on 21 May 1970.

Bukovec started her career as an athlete in her home country, specializing in hurdles. She ran the 100 metre below 13 for the first time in 1993. That year, she was also chosen as Slovenian Sportswoman of the Year; an award that she was to win a total of five times (the other years being 1995, 1996, 1997, 1998).

Bukovec won the gold medal at the 1993 Mediterranean Games, and another gold medal at the 1994 Goodwill Games. She achieved fourth place in 60m hurdles at the 1994 European Athletics Indoor Championships in Paris and fourth place in 100m hurdles at the 1994 European Athletics Championships in Helsinki.

Trained by the late Jure Kastelic, she also won the bronze at the 1995 World Indoor Championships in Barcelona in the 60 m hurdles and a silver medal in 100 m at the 1998 European Championships.

Bukovec at the 1996 Summer Olympics

At the 1996 Olympic games she went very close to winning the gold in 100 m hurdles, just a hundredth of a second away from conquering the Olympic gold. She won the silver medal in Atlanta with 12.59 seconds.

After her Olympic achievement, she continued to compete at a high level, but her career was interrupted before the next Summer Olympic Games. Bukovec won a silver medal in 100m hurdles at the 1997 Mediterranean Games, and in 1998 she won the silver at the European Athletics Championships, where she ran the 100m in 12.65, just shy of her Olympic record. She had to give up her athletic career in 1999 due to health issues.

Bukovec was named Slovenian Sportswoman of the Year for five times. At the time of her retirement she was the only Slovenian athlete to win this award for five times (she won it consecutively from 1995 to 1998). She was also named Slovenian Woman of the Year.

== Personal life ==
After her retirement she gave birth to two children and devoted herself to her new job as a mother. Bukovec and her family later resettled in Switzerland.

== Competition record ==
Year	Competition	Venue	Position	Event	Notes
Representing Yugoslavia
1988	World Junior Championships	Sudbury, Canada	11th (sf)	100m hurdles	13.96 (+1.5 m/s)
1989	European Junior Championships	Varaždin, Yugoslavia	3rd	100 m hurdles	13.50
1990	European Indoor Championships	Glasgow, United Kingdom	14th (h)	60 m hurdles	8.50
1990	European Championships	Split, Yugoslavia	16th (sf)	100 m hurdles	13.46
1991	World Indoor Championships	Seville, Spain	11th (sf)	60 m hurdles	8.16
1991	World Championships	Tokyo, Japan	25th (h)	100 m hurdles	13.44
Representing Slovenia
1992	European Indoor Championships	Genoa, Italy	11th (sf)	60 m hurdles	8.23
1992	Olympic Games	Barcelona, Spain	17th (sf)	100 m hurdles	13.68
1993	World Indoor Championships	Toronto, Canada	7th	60 m hurdles	8.28
1993	Mediterranean Games	Narbonne, France	1st	100 m hurdles	13.10
1993	World Championships	Stuttgart, Germany	10th (sf)	100 m hurdles	12.98
1994	European Indoor Championships	Paris, France	4th	60 m hurdles	7.94
1994	Goodwill Games	St. Petersburg, Russia	1st	100 m hurdles	12.83 (w)
1994	European Championships	Helsinki, Finland	4th	100 m hurdles	13.01
1995	World Indoor Championships	Barcelona, Spain	3rd	60 m hurdles	7.93
1995	World Championships	Gothenburg, Sweden	8th	100 m hurdles	13.02
1996	European Indoor Championships	Stockholm, Sweden	2nd	60 m hurdles	7.90
1996	Olympic Games	Atlanta, United States	2nd	100 m hurdles	12.59
1997	World Indoor Championships	Paris, France	5th (sf)	60 m hurdles	7.93
1997	Mediterranean Games	Bari, Italy	2nd	100 m hurdles	13.01
1997	World Championships	Athens, Greece	4th	100 m hurdles	12.69
1998	European Indoor Championships	Valencia, Spain	7th	60 m hurdles	8.34
1998	Goodwill Games	Uniondale, United States	5th	100 m hurdles	13.19
1998	European Championships	Budapest, Hungary	2nd	100 m hurdles	12.65
1999	World Indoor Championships	Maebashi, Japan	4th	60 m hurdles	7.92

Olympic Games
Preceded by Rajmond Debevec	Flagbearer for Slovenia; Atlanta 1996	Succeeded by Iztok Čop
