= Cécile Cinélu =

French hurdler

Cécile Cinélu-Aholu (born 4 June 1970 in L'Haÿ-les-Roses, France) is a retired French athlete who specialised in the 100 metres hurdles. She competed at the 1992 Summer Olympics and 1996 Summer Olympics.

Her personal bests are 12.88 seconds in the 100 metres hurdles (-0.3 m/s, Stuttgart 1993) and 8.02 seconds in the 60 metres hurdles (Liévin 1993).

== Competition record ==
Year	Competition	Venue	Position	Event	Notes
Representing France
1992	Olympic Games	Barcelona, Spain	12th (sf)	100 m hurdles	13.24
1993	Mediterranean Games	Narbonne, France	2nd	100 m hurdles	13.17
1993	World Championships	Stuttgart, Germany	8th	100 m hurdles	12.95
1994	European Indoor Championships	Paris, France	5th (sf)	60 m hurdles	8.03
1996	Olympic Games	Atlanta, United States	23rd (qf)	100 m hurdles	13.06

=== National ===
- French National Athletic Championships :
  - winner of 100m hurdles in 1996
