= Tashlin =

Tashlin is a surname. Notable people with the surname include:

- Frank Tashlin (born Francis Fredrick von Taschlein; 1913–1972), American animator, cartoonist, illustrator, screenwriter, and film director
- Lesley Tashlin (born 1969), Canadian sprinter
