= Aminata Camara =

Aminata Camara may refer to:

- Aminata Camara (footballer) (born 2003), Guinean footballer
- Aminata Camara (hurdler) (born 1973), Malian retired hurdler
