= 1990 European Athletics Indoor Championships – Women's 60 metres hurdles =

The women's 60 metres hurdles event at the 1990 European Athletics Indoor Championships was held in the Kelvin Hall on 4 March.

== Medalists ==
Gold	Silver	Bronze
Ludmila Narozhilenko; Soviet Union	Monique Éwanjé-Épée; France	Mihaela Pogăcean; Romania

== Results ==
=== Heats ===
First 2 from each heat (Q) and the next 6 fastest (q) qualified for the semifinals.

Rank	Heat	Name	Nationality	Time	Notes
1	1	Ludmila Narozhilenko	Soviet Union	7.87	Q
2	3	Mihaela Pogăcean	Romania	8.00	Q
3	2	Monique Éwanjé-Épée	France	8.04	Q
4	3	Christine Hurtlin	France	8.09	Q
5	3	Jackie Agyepong	Great Britain	8.13	q
6	2	Caren Jung	West Germany	8.19	Q
7	1	Anne Piquereau	France	8.23	Q
8	1	Birgit Wolf	West Germany	8.28	q
9	2	Sylvia Dethiér	Belgium	8.29	q
10	2	Paraskevi Patoulidou	Greece	8.29	q
11	1	Ana Barrenechea	Spain	8.44	q
12	3	Helena Fernström	Sweden	8.46	q
13	1	Carla Tuzzi	Italy	8.48	
14	3	Brigita Bukovec	Yugoslavia	8.50	
15	1	Ana Isabel Oliveira	Portugal	8.75	
	2	Emília Tavares	Portugal	DNF	

=== Semifinals ===
First 2 from each semifinal (Q) and the next 2 fastest (q) qualified for the final.

Rank	Heat	Name	Nationality	Time	Notes
1	1	Ludmila Narozhilenko	Soviet Union	7.78	Q
2	1	Monique Éwanjé-Épée	France	7.89	Q
3	2	Mihaela Pogăcean	Romania	7.94	Q
4	2	Anne Piquereau	France	8.06	Q
5	2	Christine Hurtlin	France	8.08	q
6	2	Caren Jung	West Germany	8.08^{1}	q
7	2	Paraskevi Patoulidou	Greece	8.08^{1}	
8	1	Birgit Wolf	West Germany	8.13	
9	1	Jackie Agyepong	Great Britain	8.17	
10	1	Ana Barrenechea	Spain	8.34	
11	2	Helena Fernström	Sweden	8.38	
	1	Sylvia Dethiér	Belgium	DNS	

^{1}Since both recorded the same time and were tied for sixth, Caren Jung and Paraskevi Patoulidou were ordered to run-off for the last spot in the final. Jung won with 8.08 to Patoulidou's 8.12.

=== Final ===
Rank	Lane	Name	Nationality	Time	Notes
1st place, gold medalist(s)	3	Ludmila Narozhilenko	Soviet Union	7.74	CR
2nd place, silver medalist(s)	4	Monique Éwanjé-Épée	France	7.84	
3rd place, bronze medalist(s)	2	Mihaela Pogăcean	Romania	7.99	
4	1	Anne Piquereau	France	8.02	
5	5	Caren Jung	West Germany	8.09	
6	6	Christine Hurtlin	France	8.10	
