= Carla Tuzzi =

Italian hurdler (born 1967)

Personal information
- National team: Italy: 41 caps (1987–1997)
- Born: 2 June 1967 (age 59) Frascati, Italy
- Height: 1.62 m (5 ft 4 in)
- Weight: 51 kg (112 lb)

Sport
- Country: Italy
- Sport: Athletics
- Event: 100 metres hurdles
- Club: Snam Gas Metano
- Retired: 1997

Achievements and titles
- Personal bests: 100 m hs: 12.97 (1994); 60 m hs: 7.97 (1994); 60 m: 7.43 (1996)
Medal record
Mediterranean Games
Silver medal – second place	1987 Latakia	100 m hs
Bronze medal – third place	1997 Bari	100 m hs

Carla Tuzzi (born 2 June 1967 in Frascati) is an Italian former hurdler, who best result at international individual senior level was the 5th place in the final of the 1994 European Indoor Championships with the new national record.

== Career ==
She won 19 national championships and held national record in 100 metres hurdles for 18 years (from 1994 to 2012). Tuzzi competed at three edition of World Championships (1993, 1995, 1997), one of the Olympic Games (1996) and one of the European Championshipos (1994).

She also won two medals at the Mediterranean Games ten years apart (1987 at 20 and 1997 at 30).

== Statistics ==
=== National records ===
- 60 m hs: 7.97 (France) Paris (from 13 March 1994 to 1 March 2013)
- 100 m hs: 12.97 (Spain) Valencia (from 12 June 1994 to 13 May 2012)

=== Progression ===
Personal Best

100 metres hurdles

Year	Time	Venue	Date
1997	13.05	(Spain) Valencia	31 May 1997
1996	13.12	(Italy) Rome	5 June 1996
1995	13.32	(Sweden) Gothenburg	5 August 1995
1994	12.97	(Spain) Valencia	12 June 1994
1993	13.54	(Germany) Stuttgart	19 August 1993
1990	13.97	(Italy) Bologna	18 July 1990
1989	13.40	(France) Strasbourg	5 August 1989
1983	14.17	(Austria) Schwechat	26 August 1983

60 metres hurdles indoor

Year	Time	Venue	Date
1996/97	8.13	(Italy) Genoa	11 February 1997
1995/96	8.04	(Belgium) Gent	7 February 1996
1994/95	8.10	(Spain) Barcelona	11 March 1995
1993/94	7.97	(France) Paris	13 March 1994
1991/92	8.40	(Italy) Genoa	1 March 1992
1989/90	8.48	(United Kingdom) Glasgow	4 March 1990
1988/89	8.26	(Italy) Genoa	4 February 1989
1987/88	8.52	(Hungary) Budapest	5 March 1988

=== Achievements ===
Year	Competition	Venue	Rank	Event	Time	Notes
1987	Universiade	(Socialist Federal Republic of Yugoslavia) Zagreb	18th (heat)	100 m hs	14.06	
1987	Mediterranean Games	(Syria) Latakia	2nd	100 m hs	13.57	
1988	European Indoor Championships	(Hungary) Budapest	15th (heat)	60 m hs	8.52	
1989	European Indoor Championships	(Netherlands) The Hague	13th (heat)	60 m hs	8.36	
1989	Universiade	(West Germany) Duisburg	13th (heat)	100 m hs	13.42	
1990	European Indoor Championships	(United Kingdom) Glasgow	13th (heat)	60 m hs	8.48	
1992	European Indoor Championships	(Italy) Genoa	18th (heat)	60 m hs	8.40	
1993	World Championships	(Germany) Stuttgart	Heat	100 m hs	13.54	
1994	European Indoor Championships	(France) Paris	5th	60 m hs	7.97	NR
1994	European Championships	(Finland) Helsinki	10th (SF)	100 m hs	13.05	(wind: -0.4 m/s)
1994	European Championships	(Finland) Helsinki	8th	4 × 100 m relay	44.46	
1995	World Indoor Championships	(Spain) Barcelona	13th (SF)	60 m hs	8.16	
1995	World Championships	(Sweden) Gothenburg	23rd (heat)	100 m hs	13.32	
1996	European Indoor Championships	(Sweden) Stockholm	18th (heat)	60 m	7.62	
1996	European Indoor Championships	(Sweden) Stockholm	8th (SF)	60 m hs	8.22	
1996	Olympic Games	(United States) Atlanta	Heat	100 m hs	DNF	
1997	Mediterranean Games	(Italy) Bari	3rd	100 m hs	13.30	
1997	World Championships	(Greece) Athens	19th (heat)	100 m hs	13.10	

=== National titles ===
Tuzzi won 19 national championships at individual senior level.

- Italian Athletics Championships
  - 100 m hs: 1987, 1988, 1989, 1990, 1993, 1994, 1995, 1996, 1997 (9)
- Italian Indoor Athletics Championships
  - 60 m hs: 1988, 1989, 1990, 1991, 1993, 1994, 1995, 1996, 1997 (9)
  - 60 m: 1996 (1)

== See also ==
- Italian all-time top lists – 100 m hurdles
- Italy at the 1996 Summer Olympics
- Italy at the 1993 World Championships in Athletics
- Italy at the 1995 World Championships in Athletics
- Italy at the 1997 World Championships in Athletics
