= Jacqui Agyepong =

English hurdler (born 1969)

Jacquie Agyepong
Personal information
- Born: 5 January 1969 (age 57) London, United Kingdom
- Height: 1.72 m (5 ft 8 in)
- Weight: 63 kg (139 lb)

Sport
- Sport: Athletics
- Event: 100 m hurdles
- Club: Shaftesbury Barnet Harriers

Jacqueline Nana A. D. Agyepong (born 5 January 1969, in London) is a retired English athlete who competed in the 100 metres hurdles. She represented Great Britain at the 1992 and 1996 Summer Olympics, as well as two outdoor and two indoor World Championships. In addition, she won the silver medal at the 1994 Commonwealth Games.

Her personal bests are 12.93 seconds in the 100 metres hurdles (+1.4 m/s, Lausanne 1994) and 8.01 seconds in the 60 metres hurdles (Barcelona 1995).

Agyepong is a sister of the triple jumper Francis Agyepong, and is sister-in-law of the long jumper Mary Berkeley.

== Competition record ==
Year	Competition	Venue	Position	Event	Notes
Representing Great Britain / England
1987	European Junior Championships	Birmingham, United Kingdom	4th (sf)	100 m hurdles	13.68
1988	World Junior Championships	Sudbury, Canada	7th (sf)	100 m hurdles	13.86 w (+3.8 m/s)
1988	World Junior Championships	Sudbury, Canada	5th	4 × 100 m relay	44.91
1990	European Indoor Championships	Glasgow, United Kingdom	9th (sf)	60 m hurdles	8.17
1990	European Championships	Split, Yugoslavia	–	100 m hurdles	DNF
1992	European Indoor Championships	Genoa, Italy	7th	60 m hurdles	8.25
1992	Olympic Games	Barcelona, Spain	23rd (qf)	100 m hurdles	13.36
1993	World Indoor Championships	Toronto, Canada	14th (sf)	60 m hurdles	8.67
1993	World Championships	Stuttgart, Germany	12th (sf)	100 m hurdles	13.03
1994	Goodwill Games	St. Petersburg, Russia	7th	100 m hurdles	13.13 (w)
1994	European Championships	Helsinki, Finland	7th	100 m hurdles	13.17
1994	Commonwealth Games	Victoria, Canada	2nd	100 m hurdles	13.14
1994	World Cup	London, United Kingdom	3rd	100 m hurdles	13.02
1994	World Cup	London, United Kingdom	8th	4 × 100 m relay	44.45
1995	World Indoor Championships	Barcelona, Spain	5th	60 m hurdles	8.01
1995	World Championships	Gothenburg, Sweden	14th (sf)	100 m hurdles	13.14
1996	Olympic Games	Atlanta, United States	32nd (h)	100 m hurdles	13.24
