= Elke Wölfling =

Austrian hurdler

Elke Wölfling (born 27 November 1971) is a retired Austrian athlete who specialised in the sprint hurdles. She represented her country at three indoor World Championships. Her best outing was the seventh place at the 2000 European Indoor Championships.

Her personal bests are 13.09 seconds in the 100 metres hurdles (+1.3 m/s, Wolfsberg 2003) and 8.16 seconds in the 60 metres hurdles (Linz 2003).

== Competition record ==
Year	Competition	Venue	Position	Event	Notes
Representing Austria
1990	World Junior Championships	Plovdiv, Bulgaria	20th (h)	100 m hurdles	14.51 w (wind: +2.4 m/s)
1990	World Junior Championships	Plovdiv, Bulgaria	10th (h)	4x100 m relay	46.59
1995	World Indoor Championships	Barcelona, Spain	–	60 m hurdles	DQ
1997	World Indoor Championships	Paris, France	19th (h)	60 m hurdles	8.35
2000	European Indoor Championships	Ghent, Belgium	7th	60 m hurdles	8.19
2002	European Indoor Championships	Vienna, Austria	15th (h)	60 m hurdles	8.32
2003	World Indoor Championships	Birmingham, United Kingdom	13th (sf)	60 m hurdles	8.26
