= Chan Sau Ying =

Hong Kong hurdler (born 1970)

Personal information
- Born: 30 August 1970 (age 56) Hong Kong
- Education: University of Southern California
- Height: 1.70 m (5 ft 7 in)
- Weight: 62 kg (137 lb)

Sport
- Sport: athletics
- Event: 100 m hurdles
- Coached by: Tonie Campbell

Chan Sau Ying (Chinese: 陳秀英; born 30 August 1970), also known as Wanet Chan, is a retired athlete from Hong Kong who specialised in the 100 metres hurdles. She represented her country at the 1992 and 1996 Summer Olympics, as well as three outdoor and two indoor World Championships.

She was Hong Kong's flagbearer in the opening ceremony of the 1996 Summer Olympics.

Her personal bests are 13.14 seconds in the 100 metres hurdles (Walnut 1994) and 8.32 seconds in the 60 metres hurdles (Montréal 1994). Both are still standing national records.

She competed for Mt. San Antonio College, where she won the CCCAA Heptathlon in 1993, and at the University of Southern California. In 1994 she won the hurdles at the Mt. SAC Relays with a time of 13.14 seconds. She placed fourth at the NCAA Division I final later that year with a run of 13.34 seconds. She repeated that finish at the 1995 NCAA final, with a time of 13.32 seconds.

== International competitions ==
Year	Competition	Venue	Position	Event	Result	Notes
Representing Hong Kong
1988	World Junior Championships	Sudbury, Canada	26th (h)	100 m hurdles	15.09	
1988	Asian Junior Championships	Singapore, Singapore	3rd	100 m hurdles	14.46	
1990	Asian Games	Beijing, China	4th	100 m hurdles	13.82	
1990	Commonwealth Games	Auckland, New Zealand	12th (h)	100 m hurdles	14.06	
1992	Olympic Games	Barcelona, Spain	32nd (qf)	100 m hurdles	13.88	
1993	World Indoor Championships	Toronto, Canada	23rd (h)	60 m hurdles	8.32	
1993	East Asian Games	Shanghai, China	3rd	100 m hurdles	13.35	
1993	World Championships	Stuttgart, Germany	30th (h)	100 m hurdles	13.50	
1994	Commonwealth Games	Victoria, Canada	10th (h)	100 m hurdles	13.94	
1994	Asian Games	Hiroshima, Japan	5th	100 m hurdles	13.59	
1995	Pacific Ocean Games	Cali, Colombia	1st	100 m hurdles	13.37	
1995	World Indoor Championships	Barcelona, Spain	27th (h)	60 m hurdles	8.46	
1995	World Championships	Gothenburg, Sweden	28th (h)	100 m hurdles	13.53	
1995	Universiade	Fukuoka, Japan	20th (h)	100 m hurdles	13.96	
1996	Olympic Games	Atlanta, United States	38th (h)	100 m hurdles	13.63	
1997	East Asian Games	Busan, South Korea	2nd	100 m hurdles	13.29	
Representing Hong Kong
1998	Asian Games	Bangkok, Thailand	6th	100 m hurdles	13.56	
1999	World Championships	Seville, Spain	36th (h)	100 m hurdles	13.54	
