= Patricia Girard =

French athlete (born 1968)

Personal information
- Born: 8 April 1968 (age 58) Pointe-à-Pitre, Guadeloupe, France
- Height: 1.63 m (5 ft 4 in)
- Weight: 48 kg (106 lb)

Sport
- Country: France
Medal record
Women's Athletics
Representing France
Olympic Games
Bronze medal – third place	1996 Atlanta	100 m hurdles
World Championships
Gold medal – first place	2003 Paris	4 × 100 m relay
Silver medal – second place	1999 Seville	4 × 100 m relay
Bronze medal – third place	1997 Athens	4 × 100 m relay
Mediterranean Games
Gold medal – first place	1997 Bari	100 m hurdles
Gold medal – first place	2001 Radès	100 m hurdles

Patricia Girard (also Girard-Léno; born 8 April 1968) is a French athlete who competed mainly in the 100 m hurdles.

== Biography ==
She competed for France in the 1996 Summer Olympics in the 100 m hurdles where she won the bronze medal. She also won a gold medal in the 2003 World Championships in Athletics held in Paris in the 4 × 100 m relay.

Girard is the ex-wife of kickboxer Eddy Léno.

=== Drug suspension ===
Patricia Girard tested positive for the anabolic steroid Primobolan and was suspended for two years beginning on 17 March 1990.

=== Coaching ===
At the end of 2009, Girard and her companion Karl Taillepierre created a high-level group of athletes which she trained at the Combs-la-Ville track. This group named "Team Patricia Girard" became a legally independent association declared in the Prefecture of Seine-et-Marne in February 2012 with its registered office in Combs-la-Ville. Among these athletes are: Cindy Billaud (since October 2014), Alice Decaux (up to 2011), Adrianna Lamalle (up to 2012), Gnima Faye (up to 2012), Reïna-Flor Okori, Rosvitha Okou, Cornnelly Calydon, Karl Taillepierre, Toumany Coulibaly, Pascal Martinot-Lagarde, Thomas Ravon, Mohamed Koné, Ronald Pognon and Leslie Djhone (since October 2014).

In 2013, Girard was elected Best European Coach of 2012

== Competition record ==
Year	Competition	Venue	Position	Event	Notes
Representing France
1988	European Indoor Championships	Budapest, Hungary	10th (sf)	60 m	7.33
1988	Olympic Games	Seoul, South Korea	33rd (h)	100 m	11.65
1988	Olympic Games	Seoul, South Korea	7th	4 × 100 m relay	44.02
1989	Jeux de la Francophonie	Rabat, Morocco	2nd	100 m	11.25
1989	Jeux de la Francophonie	Rabat, Morocco	1st	4 × 100 m relay	43.38
1990	European Indoor Championships	Glasgow, United Kingdom	4th	60 m	7.19
1992	Olympic Games	Barcelona, Spain	16th (sf)	100 m	11.70
1992	Olympic Games	Barcelona, Spain	4th	4 × 100 m relay	42.85
1993	World Indoor Championships	Toronto, Canada	8th	60 m	7.31
1993	World Indoor Championships	Toronto, Canada	3rd	60 m hurdles	8.01
1993	Mediterranean Games	Narbonne, France	3rd	100 m hurdles	13.19
1993	Mediterranean Games	Narbonne, France	1st	4 × 100 m relay	43.55
1993	World Championships	Stuttgart, Germany	14th (sf)	100 m hurdles	13.03
1993	World Championships	Stuttgart, Germany	4th	4 × 100 m relay	42.67
1994	European Indoor Championships	Paris, France	3rd	60 m	7.19
1994	European Indoor Championships	Paris, France	6th	60 m hurdles	7.98
1994	Jeux de la Francophonie	Bondoufle, France	1st	100 m	11.46
1994	Jeux de la Francophonie	Bondoufle, France	1st	4 × 100 m relay	43.65
1994	European Championships	Helsinki, Finland	10th (sf)	100 m	11.58
1994	European Championships	Helsinki, Finland	–	4 × 100 m relay	DQ
1995	World Indoor Championships	Barcelona, Spain	8th (sf)	60 m hurdles	8.06^{1}
1995	World Championships	Gothenburg, Sweden	8th (sf)	100 m hurdles	12.87
1995	World Championships	Gothenburg, Sweden	5th	4 × 100 m relay	43.35
1996	European Indoor Championships	Stockholm, Sweden	1st	60 m hurdles	7.89
1996	Olympic Games	Atlanta, United States	3rd	100 m hurdles	12.65
1996	Olympic Games	Atlanta, United States	6th	4 × 100 m relay	42.76
1997	World Indoor Championships	Paris, France	3rd	60 m hurdles	7.84
1997	Mediterranean Games	Bari, Italy	1st	100 m hurdles	12.90
1997	Mediterranean Games	Bari, Italy	1st	4 × 100 m relay	42.63
1997	World Championships	Athens, Greece	3rd (sf)	100 m hurdles	12.68^{2}
1997	World Championships	Athens, Greece	3rd	4 × 100 m relay	42.21
1998	European Indoor Championships	Valencia, Spain	1st	60 m hurdles	7.85
1998	European Championships	Budapest, Hungary	5th	100 m hurdles	12.89
1999	World Championships	Seville, Spain	8th	100 m hurdles	12.97
1999	World Championships	Seville, Spain	2nd	4 × 100 m relay	42.06
2000	European Indoor Championships	Ghent, Belgium	2nd	60 m hurdles	7.98
2000	Olympic Games	Sydney, Australia	21st (qf)	100 m hurdles	13.43
2001	World Championships	Edmonton, Canada	14th (sf)	100 m hurdles	13.17
2001	Mediterranean Games	Radès, Tunisia	1st	100 m hurdles	12.82
2002	European Indoor Championships	Vienna, Austria	3rd	60 m hurdles	7.98
2002	European Championships	Munich, Germany	4th	100 m hurdles	13.03
2003	World Indoor Championships	Birmingham, United Kingdom	8th	60 m hurdles	8.02
2003	World Championships	Paris, France	7th	100 m hurdles	12.83
2003	World Championships	Paris, France	1st	4 × 100 m relay	41.78
2005	European Indoor Championships	Madrid, Spain	6th	60 m hurdles	8.04

^{1}Did not finish in the final ^{2}Disqualified in the final

=== National Championships ===
- French Athletic Championships
  - (gold) 100 m hurdles in 1993, 1995, 1997, 1999, 2001, 2002 and 2003
  - (silver) 100 m hurdles in 2008 (13.23s)
- French Indoor Athletic Championships
  - (gold) 60 m in 1988, 1990, 1993 and 1995
  - (gold) 60 m hurdles in 1993, 1994, 1995, 1996, 1997, 1998, 2000, 2002 and 2003
  - (silver) 60 m hurdles in 2009 (8.24s)
  - (bronze) 60 m hurdles in 2005 (8.08s)
