= Julie Baumann =

Canadian-Swiss hurdler

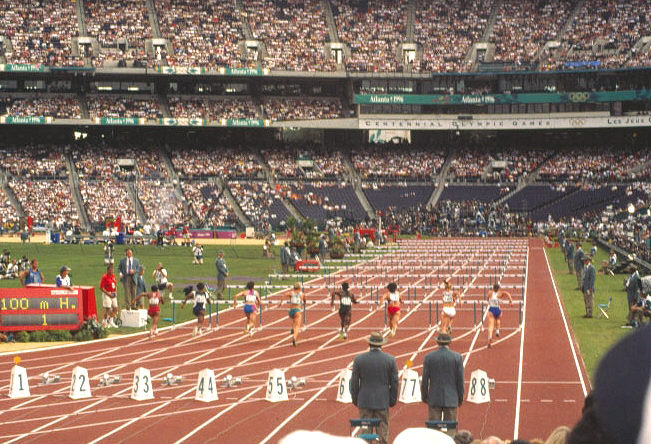
- Julie Baumann (lane 6) at the 1996 Summer Olympics 100 m hs semi-final

Personal information
- Nationality: Swiss
- Born: June 17, 1964 (age 62) Saint-Jérôme, Quebec, Canada
- Height: 1.64 m (5 ft 5 in)
- Weight: 52 kg (115 lb)

Sport
- Sport: Athletics
- Event: 100 m hurdles
Medal record
Representing Switzerland
Women's athletics
World Indoor Championships
Gold medal – first place	1993 Toronto	60 m hurdles

Julie Baumann (née Rocheleau; born June 17, 1964 in Saint-Jérôme, Quebec) is a Canadian-born Swiss retired athlete specializing in the 100 metres hurdles. She held the national record in this event between 1991 and 2011.

== Competition record ==
Year	Competition	Venue	Position	Event	Notes
Representing Canada
1986	Commonwealth Games	Edinburgh, United Kingdom	4th	100 m hurdles	13.46
1987	Universiade	Zagreb, Yugoslavia	13th (sf)	100 m hurdles	13.49
1988	Olympic Games	Seoul, South Korea	6th	100 m hurdles	12.99
Representing Switzerland
1991	World Championships	Tokyo, Japan	5th	100 m hurdles	12.88
1992	European Indoor Championships	Genoa, Italy	4th	60 m hurdles	8.11
1993	World Indoor Championships	Toronto, Ontario, Canada	1st	60 m hurdles	7.96
1993	World Championships	Stuttgart, Germany	12th (sf)	100 m hurdles	12.99
1994	European Championships	Helsinki, Finland	6th	100 m hurdles	13.10
1995	World Indoor Championships	Barcelona, Spain	11th (sf)	60 m hurdles	8.10
1995	World Championships	Gothenburg, Sweden	5th	100 m hurdles	12.95
1996	Olympic Games	Atlanta, United States	12th (sf)	100 m hurdles	12.90
1997	World Championships	Athens, Greece	11th (sf)	100 m hurdles	12.97
1998	European Championships	Budapest, Hungary	7th	100 m hurdles	13.15

== Personal bests ==
Outdoor

- 100m hurdles – 12.76 (1991 Winterthur)

Indoor

- 50m hurdles – 6.73 (1993 Grenoble)
- 60m hurdles – 7.95 (1992 Karlsruhe)
