= Keturah Anderson =

Canadian hurdler (born 1968)

Personal information
- Born: 9 January 1968 (age 58) Kingston, Jamaica

Sport
- Sport: Track and field
Medal record
Representing Canada
World Indoor Championships
Bronze medal – third place	1999 Maebashi	60 m hurdles
Commonwealth Games
Bronze medal – third place	1998 Kuala Lumpur	100 m hurdles
Summer Universiade
Bronze medal – third place	1993 Buffalo	4x100 m relay

Keturah "Katie" Anderson (born 9 January 1968 in Kingston, Jamaica) is a Canadian retired athlete specialising in the high hurdles. She won the bronze medal at the 1999 World Indoor Championships.

Anderson was an All-American sprinter for the Alabama Crimson Tide track and field team, leading off their 6th-place 4 × 100 meters relay at the 1990 NCAA Division I Outdoor Track and Field Championships.

She has personal bests of 12.61 in the 100 metres hurdles (1999) and 7.90 in the indoor 60 metres hurdles (1999 – former national record).

== Competition record ==
Year	Competition	Venue	Position	Event	Notes
Representing Canada
1984	Pan American Junior Championships	Nassau, Bahamas	1st	100 m	11.60 (w)
1986	Pan American Junior Championships	Winter Park, United States	3rd	100 m	11.69 (w)
1986	World Junior Championships	Athens, Greece	9th (sf)	100 m	11.72 w (+2.5 m/s)
1986	World Junior Championships	Athens, Greece	15th (sf)	200 m	24.38 (+0.5 m/s)
1986	World Junior Championships	Athens, Greece	7th	4 × 100 m relay	45.79
1987	World Championships	Rome, Italy	6th	4 × 100 m relay	43.26
1988	Olympic Games	Seoul, South Korea	11th (sf)	4 × 100 m relay	43.82
1989	World Indoor Championships	Budapest, Hungary	16th (h)	60 m	7.59
1990	Commonwealth Games	Auckland, New Zealand	–	4 × 100 m relay	DQ
1992	Olympic Games	Barcelona, Spain	19th (qf)	100 m hurdles	13.31
1993	World Indoor Championships	Toronto, Ontario, Canada	26th (h)	60 m	7.58
1993	Universiade	Buffalo, United States	–	100 m hurdles	DNF
1993	Universiade	Buffalo, United States	3rd	4 × 100 m relay	45.20
1993	World Championships	Stuttgart, Germany	19th (sf)	100 m hurdles	13.34
1994	Jeux de la Francophonie	Bondoufle, France	4th	100 m hurdles	13.41
1996	Olympic Games	Atlanta, United States	28th (qf)	100 m hurdles	13.17
1996	Olympic Games	Atlanta, United States	13th (h)	4 × 100 m relay	44.34
1997	World Indoor Championships	Paris, France	6th	60 m hurdles	8.02
1997	World Championships	Athens, Greece	6th	100 m hurdles	12.88
1998	Commonwealth Games	Kuala Lumpur, Malaysia	3rd	100 m hurdles	13.04
1998	Commonwealth Games	Kuala Lumpur, Malaysia	5th	4 × 100 m relay	44.23
1999	World Indoor Championships	Maebashi, Japan	3rd	60 m hurdles	7.90
1999	World Championships	Seville, Spain	15th (qf)	100 m hurdles	12.96
2000	Olympic Games	Sydney, Australia	4th (h)	100 m hurdles	12.82
