= Dionne Rose-Henley =

Jamaican hurdler (1969–2018)

Personal information
- Born: 7 November 1969 Kingston, Jamaica
- Died: 24 December 2018 (aged 49)

Sport
- Sport: Track and field
Medal record
Representing Jamaica
Central American and Caribbean Games
Gold medal – first place	1998 Maracaibo	100m hurdles
Gold medal – first place	2002 San Salvador	100m hurdles
Bronze medal – third place	2002 San Salvador	4x100m relay

Dionne Marie Rose-Henley (7 November 1969 – 24 December 2018) was a Jamaican athlete who specialised in the 100 metres hurdles. She competed at the 1992 and 1996 Summer Olympics, finishing fifth at her second Games.

Rose-Henley was a two-time All-American long jumper for the Middle Tennessee Blue Raiders track and field team, finishing 4th in the long jump at the 1994 NCAA Division I Indoor Track and Field Championships and 1994 NCAA Division I Outdoor Track and Field Championships. She also competed for the Florida Gators track and field team.

Her personal best times were 12.64 in the 100 meters hurdles (1996) and 7.96 in the indoor 60 meters hurdles (1997). In 2017, she coached sprinters and hurdlers at Coastal Carolina University.

After retiring from Track and Field she took up coaching. She coached at Middle Tennessee State University where she was a past student.

Rose-Henley died on 24 December 2018 at age 49, after a short battle with cancer.

== Competition record ==
Year	Competition	Venue	Position	Event	Notes
Representing Jamaica
1988	CARIFTA Games (U20)	Kingston, Jamaica	3rd	Long jump	5.81 m
1991	Central American and Caribbean Championships	Xalapa, Mexico	2nd	100 m hurdles	14.00
1991	Central American and Caribbean Championships	Xalapa, Mexico	1st	4 × 100 m relay	44.54
1991	Central American and Caribbean Championships	Xalapa, Mexico	2nd	Long jump	6.08 m
1991	Pan American Games	Havana, Cuba	–	100m hurdles	DNF
1991	Pan American Games	Havana, Cuba	7th	Long jump	6.24 m
1992	Olympic Games	Barcelona, Spain	11th (sf)	100m hurdles	13.22
1992	Olympic Games	Barcelona, Spain	24th (q)	Long jump	6.22 m
1993	World Indoor Championships	Toronto, Canada	–	60m hurdles	DNF
1993	World Indoor Championships	Toronto, Canada	13th (q)	Long jump	6.36 m
1993	World Championships	Stuttgart, Germany	15th (sf)	100m hurdles	13.43
1993	World Championships	Stuttgart, Germany	25th (q)	Long jump	6.15 m
1994	Commonwealth Games	Victoria, Canada	4th	100m hurdles	13.42
1994	Commonwealth Games	Victoria, Canada	4th	4x100m relay	43.51
1994	Commonwealth Games	Victoria, Canada	7th	Long jump	6.47 m
1995	World Indoor Championships	Barcelona, Spain	7th (sf)	60m hurdles	8.04
1995	World Championships	Gothenburg, Sweden	7th	100m hurdles	12.98
1995	World Championships	Gothenburg, Sweden	31st (q)	Long jump	6.07 m
1996	Olympic Games	Atlanta, United States	5th	100m hurdles	12.64
1997	World Championships	Athens, Greece	5th	100m hurdles	12.87
1998	Central American and Caribbean Games	Maracaibo, Venezuela	1st	100m hurdles	12.64
1999	World Indoor Championships	Maebashi, Japan	7th	60m hurdles	8.05
1999	World Championships	Seville, Spain	6th	100m hurdles	12.80
2001	World Championships	Edmonton, Canada	6th	100m hurdles	12.79
2001	Goodwill Games	Brisbane, Australia	5th	100m hurdles	13.01
2002	Central American and Caribbean Games	San Salvador, El Salvador	1st	100m hurdles	13.67
2002	Central American and Caribbean Games	San Salvador, El Salvador	3rd	4x100m relay	50.62
