= Nicole Ramalalanirina =

French athlete (born 1972)

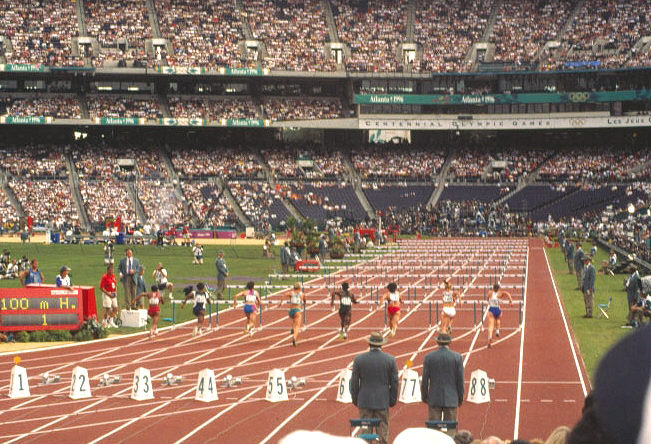
- Nicole Ramalalanirina (lane 1) at the 1996 Summer Olympics 100 m semi-final

Personal information
- Born: 5 March 1972 (age 54) Antananarivo, Madagascar
- Height: 1.64 m (5 ft 5 in)
- Weight: 57 kg (126 lb)

Sport
- Sport: Athletics
- Event: 100 meters hurdles
- Club: Neuilly-Plaisance Sports; PEC Athlétisme Poitiers

Achievements and titles
- Personal best: 12.76
Medal record
Women's athletics
Representing Madagascar
All-Africa Games
Bronze medal – third place	1991 Cairo	100 m hurdles
African Championships
Gold medal – first place	1993 Durban	100 m hurdles
Silver medal – second place	1993 Durban	4×100 m
Bronze medal – third place	1992 Belle Vue Harel	4×100 m
Jeux de la Francophonie
Gold medal – first place	1994 Bondoufle	100 m hurdles
Gold medal – first place	1997 Antananarivo	100 m hurdles
Summer Universiade
Bronze medal – third place	1993 Buffalo	100 m hurdles
Gold medal – first place	1995 Fukuoka	100 m hurdles
Representing France
World Athletics Indoor Championships
Bronze medal – third place	2001 Lisbon	60 m hurdles

Nicole Ramalalanirina (born 5 March 1972 in Antananarivo, Madagascar) is a French athlete who specializes in the 100 metres hurdles. She changed nationality from her native Madagascar in 1998.

Her personal best time in the 100 metres hurdles is 12.76 seconds, achieved in November 2000 in La Chaux-de-Fonds.

Nicole competed in the Olympic Games four times, twice for Madagascar(1992, 1996) and twice for France(2000, 2004). Her best Olympic result was a 6th place in the 100m high hurdles at Sydney in 2000 with a time of 12.91.

Nicole finished her career by winning the French Indoor National 60m Hurdles championship in both 2004 and 2006.

== Competition record ==
Year	Competition	Venue	Position	Event	Notes
Representing Madagascar
1991	All-Africa Games	Cairo, Egypt	3rd	100 m hurdles	13.70
1992	Olympic Games	Barcelona, Spain	24th (h)	100 m hurdles	13.40
1993	World Indoor Championships	Toronto, Canada	21st (h)	60 m hurdles	8.36
1993	African Championships	Durban, South Africa	1st	100 m hurdles	13.32
1993	Universiade	Buffalo, United States	3rd	100 m hurdles	13.28
1993	World Championships	Stuttgart, Germany	11th (sf)	100 m hurdles	13.16
1994	Jeux de la Francophonie	Bondoufle, France	1st	100 m hurdles	13.17
1995	World Indoor Championships	Barcelona, Spain	12th (sf)	60 m hurdles	8.11
1995	World Championships	Gothenburg, Sweden	16th (h)	100 m hurdles	13.24
1995	Universiade	Fukuoka, Japan	1st	100 m hurdles	13.02
1996	Olympic Games	Atlanta, United States	13th (sf)	100 m hurdles	13.01
1996	Olympic Games	Atlanta, United States	–	4 × 100 m relay	DNF
1997	World Championships	Athens, Greece	25th (h)	100 m hurdles	13.21
1997	Jeux de la Francophonie	Antananarivo, Madagascar	1st	100 m hurdles	13.21
Representing France
1998	European Championships	Budapest, Hungary	4th	100 m hurdles	12.87
1999	World Indoor Championships	Maebashi, Japan	9th (h)	60 m hurdles	8.06
1999	World Championships	Seville, Spain	14th (sf)	100 m hurdles	12.96
2000	Olympic Games	Sydney, Australia	6th	100 m hurdles	12.91
2001	World Indoor Championships	Lisbon, Portugal	3rd	60 m hurdles	7.96
2001	World Championships	Edmonton, Canada	12th (h)	100 m hurdles	12.91
2002	European Indoor Championships	Vienna, Austria	4th	60 m hurdles	8.01
2004	World Indoor Championships	Budapest, Hungary	8th	60 m hurdles	8.01
2004	Olympic Games	Athens, Greece	19th (h)	100 m hurdles	13.07
2005	European Indoor Championships	Madrid, Spain	12th (sf)	60 m hurdles	8.12
2006	World Indoor Championships	Moscow, Russia	18th (h)	60 m hurdles	8.14
2006	European Championships	Gothenburg, Sweden	17th (h)	100 m hurdles	13.34
