= 1994 IAAF Grand Prix Final =

- Host city: Paris, France
- Events: 17
- Dates: 3 September
- Main venue: Stade Sébastien Charléty

The 1994 IAAF Grand Prix Final was the tenth edition of the season-ending competition for the IAAF Grand Prix track and field circuit, organised by the International Association of Athletics Federations. It was held on 3 September at the Stade Sébastien Charléty in Paris, France.

Noureddine Morceli (1500 metres) and Jackie Joyner-Kersee (long jump) were the overall points winners of the tournament. A total of 17 athletics events were contested, nine for men and eight for women.

== Medal summary ==
=== Men ===
Event	Gold		Silver		Bronze	
Overall	Noureddine Morceli (ALG)	78	Samuel Matete (ZAM)	72	Mike Conley, Sr. (USA)	72
100 metres	Dennis Mitchell (USA)	10.12	Linford Christie (GBR)	10.13	Jon Drummond (USA)	10.18
400 metres	Derek Mills (USA)	45.22	Antonio Pettigrew (USA)	45.26	Samson Kitur (KEN)	45.37
1500 metres	Noureddine Morceli (ALG)	3:40.89	Vénuste Niyongabo (BDI)	3:41.72	Abdi Bile (SOM)	3:42.24
5000 metres	Khalid Skah (MAR)	13:14.63	Khalid Boulami (MAR)	13:14.64	Moses Kiptanui (KEN)	13:14.93
400 m hurdles	Samuel Matete (ZAM)	48.02	Derrick Adkins (USA)	48.05	Stéphane Diagana (FRA)	48.64
High jump	Javier Sotomayor (CUB)	2.33 m	Troy Kemp (BAH)	2.33 m	Dragutin Topić (FRY)	2.30 m
Triple jump	Mike Conley, Sr. (USA)	17.68 m	Oleg Sakirkin (KAZ)	17.17 m	Vasiliy Sokov (RUS)	16.87 m
Shot put	Randy Barnes (USA)	20.60 m	C. J. Hunter (USA)	20.50 m	Gregg Tafralis (USA)	20.49 m
Hammer throw	Andrey Abduvaliyev (TJK)	81.46 m	Igor Astapkovich (BLR)	79.54 m	Vasiliy Sidorenko (RUS)	79.12 m

=== Women ===
Event	Gold		Silver		Bronze	
Overall	Jackie Joyner-Kersee (USA)	72	Svetla Dimitrova (BUL)	72	Sonia O'Sullivan (IRL)	72
100 metres	Merlene Ottey (JAM)	10.78	Gwen Torrence (USA)	10.82	Irina Privalova (RUS)	11.02
400 metres	Marie-José Pérec (FRA)	49.77	Cathy Freeman (AUS)	50.04	Maicel Malone (USA)	50.33
1500 metres	Angela Chalmers (CAN)	4:01.61	Hassiba Boulmerka (ALG)	4:01.85	Yekaterina Podkopayeva (RUS)	4:01.92
5000 metres	Sonia O'Sullivan (IRL)	15:12.94	Lyudmila Borisova (RUS)	15:14.61	Alison Wyeth (GBR)	15:15.45
100 m hurdles	Svetla Dimitrova (BUL)	12.66	Yuliya Graudyn (RUS)	12.79	Aliuska López (CUB)	12.86
Long jump	Jackie Joyner-Kersee (USA)	7.21 m	Inessa Kravets (UKR)	6.98 m	Heike Drechsler (GER)	6.83 m
Discus throw	Ilke Wyludda (GER)	65.84 m	Mette Bergmann (NOR)	64.72 m	Ellina Zvereva (BLR)	63.96 m
Javelin throw	Natalya Shikolenko (BLR)	68.26 m	Trine Hattestad (NOR)	67.04 m	Claudia Isaila (ROM)	66.56 m
