= Tatyana Reshetnikova =

Russian former hurdler (born 1966)

Tatyana Reshetnikova (born 14 October 1966) is a Russian former hurdler. She finished fourth in the 100 metres hurdles final at the 1995 World Championships. Her best time in the 100m hurdles of 12.53 secs on 4 July 1994 in Linz, was the fastest time in the world for that year (tied with Svetla Dimitrova).

She is married to 1988 Olympic pole vault silver medallist, Rodion Gataullin.

== International competitions ==
Representing Russia
| Year | Competition | Venue | Position | Event | Notes |
|---|---|---|---|---|---|
| 1994 | European Championships | Helsinki, Finland | 5th | 100 m hurdles | 13.06 |
| 1995 | World Championships | Gothenburg, Sweden | 4th | 100 m hurdles | 12.87 |
| 1996 | Olympic Games | Atlanta, United States | 21st (qf) | 100 m hurdles | 13.01 |
