= Gillian Russell =

Jamaican hurdler (born 1973)

Personal information
- Born: 28 September 1973 (age 52) Saint Andrew Parish, Jamaica

Sport
- Sport: Track and field
Medal record
Women's Athletics
Representing Jamaica
Olympic Games
Bronze medal – third place	1996 Atlanta	4x100m relay
World Indoor Championships
Silver medal – second place	1997 Paris	60m hurdles
Commonwealth Games
Gold medal – first place	1998 Kuala Lumpur	100 m hurdles
Central American and Caribbean Games
Silver medal – second place	1998 Maracaibo	100 m hurdles
Bronze medal – third place	1998 Maracaibo	4×100 m relay
CAC Championships
Gold medal – first place	1999 Bridgetown	100 m hurdles
Gold medal – first place	1999 Bridgetown	4×100 m relay
World Junior Championships
Gold medal – first place	1990 Sudbury	100m hurdles
Gold medal – first place	1990 Sudbury	4x100m relay
Gold medal – first place	1992 Seoul	100m hurdles
Gold medal – first place	1992 Seoul	4x100m relay
CAC Junior Championships Junior (U20)
Gold medal – first place	1990 Havana	4x100 m relay
Silver medal – second place	1990 Havana	100 m
Silver medal – second place	1990 Havana	100 m hurdles
CARIFTA Games Junior (U20)
Gold medal – first place	1990 Kingston	100 m hurdles
Gold medal – first place	1990 Kingston	4×100 m relay
CAC Junior Championships Junior (U17)
Gold medal – first place	1988 Nassau	100 m
Gold medal – first place	1988 Nassau	100 m hurdles
Gold medal – first place	1988 Nassau	4x100 m relay
CARIFTA Games Youth (U17)
Gold medal – first place	1988 Kingston	100 m

Gillian Claire Russell-Love (born 28 September 1973) is a Jamaican athlete who specializes in the 100 metres hurdles.

== Career ==
In her early career she won four gold medals at the World Junior Championships, which is a record. Russell won three consecutive 100 m hurdles NCAA DI titles for the Miami Hurricanes track and field program.

== Achievements ==
Year	Competition	Venue	Position	Event	Notes
Representing Jamaica
1988	CARIFTA Games (U-17)	Kingston, Jamaica	1st	100 m	11.90
1988	Central American and Caribbean Junior Championships (U-17)	Nassau, Bahamas	1st	100 m	12.04 (-0.2 m/s)
1988	Central American and Caribbean Junior Championships (U-17)	Nassau, Bahamas	1st	100 m hurdles	14.64 (-0.2 m/s)
1988	Central American and Caribbean Junior Championships (U-17)	Nassau, Bahamas	1st	4 × 100 m relay	46.75
1988	World Junior Championships	Sudbury, Canada	10th (sf)	100m hurdles	13.95 w (wind: +3.8 m/s)
1990	CARIFTA Games (U-20)	Kingston, Jamaica	1st	100 m hurdles	13.8 (1.8 m/s)
1990	CARIFTA Games (U-20)	Kingston, Jamaica	1st	4 × 100 m relay	45.39
1990	Central American and Caribbean Junior Championships (U-20)	Havana, Cuba	2nd	100 m	11.83 (-0.4 m/s)
1990	Central American and Caribbean Junior Championships (U-20)	Havana, Cuba	5th	200 m	24.77 (-0.5 m/s)
1990	Central American and Caribbean Junior Championships (U-20)	Havana, Cuba	2nd	100 m hurdles	13.86 (-0.2 m/s)
1990	Central American and Caribbean Junior Championships (U-20)	Havana, Cuba	1st	4 × 100 m relay	45.62
1990	World Junior Championships	Plovdiv, Bulgaria	1st	100 m hurdles,	13.31 (wind: +0.3 m/s) PB
1990	World Junior Championships	Plovdiv, Bulgaria	1st	4 × 100 m relay	43.82
1992	World Junior Championships	Seoul, South Korea	1st	100 m hurdles	13.21 (wind: +1.0 m/s)
1992	World Junior Championships	Seoul, South Korea	1st	4 × 100 m relay	43.96
1992	Olympic Games	Barcelona, Spain	14th (sf)	100 m hurdles	13.35
1993	Universiade	Buffalo, United States	16th (h)	100 m	11.98
1993	Universiade	Buffalo, United States	4th	100 m hurdles	13.46
1993	World Championships	Stuttgart, Germany	16th (sf)	100 m hurdles	13.12 (0.3 m/s)
1995	World Championships	Gothenburg, Sweden	5th	100 m hurdles	12.96 (0.2 m/s)
1996	Olympic Games	Atlanta, United States	9th (qf)	100 m hurdles	12.78 (1.4 m/s)
1996	Olympic Games	Atlanta, United States	3rd	4 × 100 m relay	43.36 (h)
1997	World Indoor Championships	Paris, France	2nd	60 m hurdles	7.84
1998	Goodwill Games	Uniondale, United States	2nd	100 m hurdles	12.78
1998	Central American and Caribbean Games	Maracaibo, Venezuela	2nd	100 m hurdles	12.66 PB
1998	Central American and Caribbean Games	Maracaibo, Venezuela	3rd	4 × 100 m relay	44.89
1998	Commonwealth Games	Kuala Lumpur, Malaysia	1st	100 m hurdles	12.70 CR
1999	Central American and Caribbean Championships	Bridgetown, Barbados	1st	100 m hurdles	13.25
1999	Central American and Caribbean Championships	Bridgetown, Barbados	1st	4 × 100 m relay	44.18
1999	World Championships	Seville, Spain	25th (qf)	100 m hurdles	13.12 (0.2 m/s)
