= Aminata Camara (hurdler) =

Malian hurdler (born 1973)

Aminata Camara (born 6 December 1973) is a retired Malian hurdler. She competed at the 1996 Olympic Games and the 1997 World Indoor Championships without reaching the final. Her personal best time was 14.94 seconds, achieved at the 1996 Summer Olympics.
