= Samantha Farquharson =

English athlete

Personal information
- Nationality: English
- Born: 15 December 1969

Sport
- Country: England and Great Britain
- Sport: Athletics
Medal record
Commonwealth Games
Bronze medal – third place	1994 Victoria	Women's 100 metres hurdles

Samantha Farquharson (born 15 December 1969) is an English athlete.

Farquharson competed at the 1994 Commonwealth Games where she won a bronze medal in the Women's 100 metres hurdles event and at the 1995 IAAF World Indoor Championships in the Women's 60 metres hurdles event where she finished 15th.
