= Svetlana Laukhova =

Russian hurdler (1973–2023)

Personal information
- Born: 1 February 1973 Leningrad, Soviet Union
- Died: 28 October 2023 (aged 50) St. Petersburg, Russia

Sport
- Sport: Track and field
Medal record
Representing Russia
European Indoor Championships
Silver medal – second place	1998 Valencia	60m hurdles
Summer Universiade
Bronze medal – third place	1995 Fukuoka	100m hurdles
Bronze medal – third place	1997 Catania	100m hurdles

Svetlana Vyacheslanovna Laukhova (Russian: Светлана Вячеславовна Лаухова; 1 February 1973 – 28 October 2023) was a Russian athlete who specialised in the 100 metres hurdles. She represented her country at the 2000 Summer Olympics reaching the semifinals.

Her personal bests were 12.72 seconds in the 100 metres hurdles (2001) and 7.95 seconds in the 60 metres hurdles (1998).

Her husband was football player Sergey Dmitriyev. Laukhova died on 28 October 2023, at the age of 50.

== Doping rule violation ==
Laukhova was disqualified from the 2001 IAAF World Indoor Championships because of an anti-doping rule violation.

== Competition record ==
Year	Competition	Venue	Position	Event	Time	Notes
Representing the Soviet Union
1991	European Junior Championships	Thessaloniki, Greece	11th (sf)	100 m hurdles	14.18	
Representing the Unified Team
1992	World Junior Championships	Seoul, South Korea	3rd	100 m hurdles	13.55	wind: +1.0 m/s
Representing Russia
1995	Universiade	Fukuoka, Japan	3rd	100 m hurdles	13.08	
1997	World Indoor Championships	Paris, France	15th (h)	60 m hurdles	8.25	
1997	World Championships	Athens, Greece	7th	100 m hurdles	12.98	
1997	Universiade	Catania, Italy	3rd	100 m hurdles	13.22	
1998	European Indoor Championships	Valencia, Spain	2nd	60 m hurdles	8.01	
1998	Goodwill Games	Uniondale, United States	–	100 m hurdles	DNF	
1999	World Championships	Seville, Spain	11th (sf)	100 m hurdles	12.86	
2000	Olympic Games	Sydney, Australia	10th (sf)	100 m hurdles	12.95	
2001	World Indoor Championships	Lisbon, Portugal	5th	60 m hurdles	7.99	
2001	World Championships	Edmonton, Canada	DQ (sf)	100 m hurdles	13.00	
2002	European Indoor Championships	Vienna, Austria	12th (h)	60 m hurdles	8.28	
2002	European Championships	Munich, Germany	11th (sf)	100 m hurdles	13.06	
2003	World Championships	Paris, France	15th (sf)	100 m hurdles	12.98	

== See also ==
- List of doping cases in athletics
- List of European Athletics Indoor Championships medalists (women)
- Russia at the World Athletics Championships
- Doping at the World Athletics Championships
