= Eva Sokolova =

Russian hurdler

Personal information
- Born: 25 March 1961 (age 65)

Sport
- Sport: Track and field
Medal record
Representing Russia
European Indoor Championships
Silver medal – second place	1994 Paris	60 m hurdles

Eva Sokolova (née Nikolayeva, Russian: Ева Соколова; born 25 March 1961) is a Russian track and field hurdler who competed in the 100 metres hurdles.

Sokolova emerged at national level with a win at the 1987 Soviet Athletics Championships, where she set a personal best of 12.82 seconds. An indoor title in the 60 metres hurdles followed with a run of 8.05 seconds at the Soviet indoor championships. She moved into the top ten ranked hurdlers for the season in 1989 with a new best of 12.70 seconds, placing eighth for the year. This was a lifetime best.

Her major international debut came after the dissolution of the Soviet Union, when she represented Russia at the 1993 World Championships in Athletics. After winning her semi-final in a time of 12.76 seconds she looked to be among the medal contenders, but she failed to match this form in the final and settled for fifth place. Her compatriot Marina Azyabina became Russia's first medallist in the event. Her best result that season came in Linz and at 12.75 seconds she was seventh in the world rankings.

She claimed her only international medal at the 1994 European Athletics Indoor Championships. In the 60 m hurdles final she was beaten only by world record holder Yordanka Donkova and her silver was Russia's first medal in the event.

== International competitions ==
Year	Competition	Venue	Position	Event	Notes
1993	World Championships	Stuttgart, Germany	5th	100 m hurdles	12.78
1994	European Indoor Championships	Paris, France	2nd	60 m hurdles	7.89

== National titles ==
- Soviet Athletics Championships
  - 100 m hurdles: 1987
- Soviet Indoor Athletics Championships
  - 60 m hurdles: 1988
