= Olena Krasovska =

Ukrainian hurdler (born 1976)

Personal information
- Born: 17 August 1976 (age 50) Kyiv, Ukraine
- Height: 176 cm (5 ft 9 in)
- Weight: 62 kg (137 lb)
Medal record
Women's athletics
Representing Ukraine
Olympic Games
Silver medal – second place	2004 Athens	100 metres hurdles
European Championships
Silver medal – second place	2002 Munich	100 metres hurdles
European Indoor Championships
Bronze medal – third place	2000 Ghent	60 metres hurdles
European Team Championships
Bronze medal – third place	2009 Leiria	100 m hurdles
Summer Universiade
Silver medal – second place	1995 Fukuoka	100 metres hurdles
European Cup
Silver medal – second place	1995 Villeneuve d'Ascq	100 metres hurdles
European Athletics U20 Championships
Gold medal – first place	1995 Nyíregyháza	100 metres hurdles
European Youth Olympic Festival
Bronze medal – third place	1993 Valkenswaard	100 m hurdles

Olena Krasovska, née Ovcharova (Ukrainian: Олена Красовська, born 17 August 1976) is a Ukrainian hurdler. She is best known for winning a silver medal at the 2004 Olympic Games with a personal best time of 12.45 seconds.

== Career ==
She was born in Kyiv, and represents the sports club Dynamo Kyiv. In her early career she won the bronze medal in 60 metres hurdles at the 2000 European Indoor Championships. She also competed at the 1995 World Championships, the 1996 Olympic Games, the 1997 World Indoor Championships, the 1998 European Championships, the 2000 Olympic Games, the 2001 World Indoor Championships and the 2001 World Championships without reaching the final. She ran in 12.88 seconds as early as in June 1995 in Villeneuve-d'Ascq, but did not improve this time until August 2000 in Kyiv, when she ran in 12.82 seconds. In 2001, she ran in 12.87 seconds in Seville in June. Also, in the 4 x 100 metres relay she competed at the 2000 Olympic Games without reaching the final.

In 2002, she won the silver medal at the 2002 European Championships, finished eighth at the IAAF Grand Prix Final and fourth at the 2002 IAAF World Cup. She came close to setting a new personal best with 12.85 seconds in June 2002 in Lucerne. but 2003 was a substantially weaker year with only 13.06 seconds. She competed at the 2003 World Championships without reaching the final. In 2004, she won the European Cup competition in Bydgoszcz, clocking in 12.78 seconds, before winning the silver medal at the 2004 Olympic Games with a personal best time of 12.45 seconds. She only finished fifth at the 2004 World Athletics Final. In the next year she reached the semi-final of the 2005 World Championships, and had a season's best of 12.75. She has not run a sub-13 second hurdles race since, but came close with 13.01 seconds at DN Galan in 2008 and 13.00 seconds in Yalta in June 2009.

12.45 seconds puts Krasovska in a joint 18th place on the all-time world list. It is also the fastest time achieved by a hurdler representing Ukraine—yet she does not hold the Ukrainian record, as the Ukrainian record holder Nataliya Grygoryeva achieved her time of 12.39 seconds whilst representing the Soviet Union. Other personal bests include 8.01 seconds in the 60 metres hurdles (indoor), achieved in February 2000 in Kyiv; 7.35 seconds in the 60 metres (indoor), achieved in January 2001 in Kyiv; and 11.53 seconds in the 100 metres, achieved in May 2002 in Kyiv. She jumped 6.52 metres in the long jump, indoor, in February 1999 in Lviv.
