= Véronique Linster =

Luxembourgish hurdler

Personal information
- Nationality: Luxembourgish
- Born: 13 June 1968 (age 58) Luxembourg City, Luxembourg

Sport
- Sport: Track and field
- Event: 100 metres hurdles

Véronique Linster (born 13 June 1968) is a Luxembourgish hurdler. She competed in the women's 100 metres hurdles at the 1996 Summer Olympics.

== International competitions ==
Year	Competition	Venue	Position	Event	Notes
Representing Luxembourg
1985	Games of the Small States of Europe	Serravalle, San Marino	2nd	4 × 100 m relay	49.29
1989	Games of the Small States of Europe	Nicosia, Cyprus	3rd	4 × 100 m relay	48.28
1993	Games of the Small States of Europe	Malta	3rd	100 m	12.25
1993	Games of the Small States of Europe	Malta	3rd	100 m hurdles	14.42
1994	Jeux de la Francophonie	Bondoufle, France	9th (h)	100 m hurdles	13.61
1994	European Championships	Helsinki, Finland	26th (h)	100 m hurdles	13.68
1995	Games of the Small States of Europe	Luxembourg City, Luxembourg	1st	100 m	11.80
1995	Games of the Small States of Europe	Luxembourg City, Luxembourg	2nd	100 m hurdles	13.45
1995	World Championships	Gothenburg, Sweden	30th (h)	100 m hurdles	13.74
1996	Olympic Games	Atlanta, United States	36th (h)	100 m hurdles	13.47
1997	World Indoor Championships	Paris, France	21st (h)	60 m hurdles	8.37
