= Lena Solli-Reimann =

Norwegian hurdler

Personal information
- Nationality: Norwegian
- Born: 21 September 1969 (age 56) Malmö, Sweden

Sport
- Sport: Athletics

Lena Solli-Reimann (born 21 September 1969) is a Norwegian hurdler. She was born in Malmö, Sweden.

She was Norwegian champion in 100 metres hurdles in 1992, 1993, 1995 and 1996. She competed in the 100 metres hurdles at the 1996 Summer Olympics in Atlanta.
