= Lynda Tolbert-Goode =

American hurdler

- Tolbert-Goode at the 1996 Summer Olympics 100 m hurdles

Personal information
- Born: October 3, 1967 (age 58) Washington, D.C., U.S.
Medal record
Women's athletics (track and field)
Representing United States
World Championships
Bronze medal – third place	1993 Stuttgart	100 m hurdles

Lynda Tolbert-Goode (née Tolbert, born October 3, 1967, in Washington, D.C.) is a retired American hurdler and sprinter. She claimed the bronze medal in the women's 100 m hurdles event at the 1993 World Championships in Stuttgart, Germany.

Representing the Arizona State Sun Devils track and field team, Tolbert-Goode won the 1988 and 1990 NCAA Division I Outdoor Track and Field Championships in the 100 m hurdles.

== Achievements ==
All results regarding 100m hurdles.

Year	Competition	Venue	Position	Notes
1989	World Cup	Barcelona, Spain	3rd	12.86
1992	Olympic Games	Barcelona, Spain	4th	12.75
1993	World Championships	Stuttgart, Germany	3rd	12.67
1996	Olympic Games	Atlanta, United States	7th	13.11
