= Lesley Tashlin =

Canadian sprinter (born 1969)

Personal information
- Born: 27 May 1969 (age 56) Toronto, Ontario, Canada

Sport
- Sport: Sprinting
- Event: 4 × 100 metres relay

Lesley Tashlin (born 27 May 1969) is a Canadian sprinter. She competed in the women's 4 × 100 metres relay at the 1996 Summer Olympics.
