= Cheryl Dickey =

American hurdler (born 1966)

Personal information
- Born: December 12, 1966 (age 59) Houston, Texas, U.S.
Medal record
Women's athletics
World Indoor Championships
Bronze medal – third place	1997 Paris	60 m hurdles

Cheryl Dickey (born December 12, 1966, in Houston, Texas) is a retired American hurdler.

Dickey competed for the Texas Southern Tigers track and field team in the NCAA.

She won the bronze medal at the 1997 World Indoor Championships in Paris.

Her personal best time is 12.72 seconds, achieved in 1998.
