= Yuliya Graudyn =

Russian hurdler (born 1970)

Medal record

Women's athletics

Representing Russia

World Championships
Bronze medal – third place	1995 Gothenburg	100 m hurdles

European Championships
Silver medal – second place	1994 Helsinki	100 m hurdles

IAAF Grand Prix Final
Silver medal – second place	1994 Paris	100 m hurdles

Yuliya Graudyn (Russian: Юлия Граудынь; born as Yulia Filippova, 13 November 1970) is a retired Russian hurdler. Her personal best for the 100 metres hurdles was 12.62 seconds, achieved in August 1994 in Berlin. She was a medalist in the event at the 1994 European Athletics Championships and 1995 World Championships in Athletics. Her husband Vladimir Graudyn was a world and European indoor medallist in the 800 m.

She was born Yuliya Filippova, the daughter of Igor Fillipov – a physical education teacher in Moscow.

== International competitions ==
Year	Competition	Venue	Position	Event	Time	Notes
Representing the Soviet Union
1988	World Junior Championships	Sudbury, Canada	4th	100 m hurdles	13.76	wind: -2.6 m/s
Representing Russia
1993	World Indoor Championships	Toronto, Canada	4th	60 m hurdles	8.01	
1994	European Championships	Helsinki, Finland	2nd	100 m hurdles	12.93	wind: -1.7 m/s
1994	IAAF Grand Prix Final	Paris, France	2nd	100 m hurdles	12.79	
1995	World Championships	Gothenburg, Sweden	3rd	100 m hurdles	12.85	
