= Svetla Dimitrova =

Bulgarian athlete

Personal information
- Born: 27 January 1970 (age 56)
Medal record
Women's athletics
Representing Bulgaria
World Championships
Silver medal – second place	1997 Athens	100 m hurdles
European Championships
Gold medal – first place	1994 Helsinki	100 m hurdles
Gold medal – first place	1998 Budapest	100 m hurdles
Bronze medal – third place	1994 Helsinki	4×100 m

Svetla Stefanova Dimitrova (Bulgarian: Светла Стефанова Димитрова) (born 27 January 1970 in Botevgrad) is a former Bulgarian athlete who started out competing in heptathlon, and later specialized as a sprint hurdler. She represented her country four times at the Summer Olympics, from 1988 to 2000. Her best Olympic placing was fifth in the heptathlon at the 1992 Barcelona Olympics.

She won the inaugural heptathlon competition at the 1986 World Junior Championships in Athletics and returned two years later to defend it at the 1988 World Junior Championships in Athletics. She broke the world junior record for the heptathlon at the 1989 European Cup with a score of 6534 points, but the mark was never ratified as she failed a doping test afterwards. She was suspended for two years and returned in 1992. She won the 1993 edition of the Hypo-Meeting.

She was the silver medallist in the hurdles at the 1994 IAAF World Cup and won that event at the 1994 IAAF Grand Prix Final with a career best time of 12.53 seconds. In 1997 she competed in the World Championships held in Athens, Greece in the 100 metres hurdles where she finished second behind Sweden's Ludmila Engquist. She won two straight hurdles titles at the 1994 European Athletics Championships and 1998 European Athletics Championships. At the 1999 World Championships in Athletics she came fifth in the hurdles final and improved to fourth at the 2001 World Championships in Athletics. She tried for a third straight European title at the 2002 European Athletics Championships but hit a hurdle in the final and finished last. She retired from competition in 2004.

Dimitrova was a contestant in the second season of Survivor BG: Expedition Robinson. After her athletics career she married and is now Svetla Pishtikova.

== See also ==
- List of doping cases in athletics

Sporting positions
Preceded by (United States) Gail Devers	Women's 100 m Hurdles Best Year Performance alongside (Russia) Tatyana Reshetnykova; 1994	Succeeded by (Kazakhstan) Olga Shishigina
