= 1994 European Athletics Indoor Championships =

- Dates: 11–13 March
- Host city: Paris; France
- Venue: Palais Omnisports de Paris-Bercy
- Events: 27
- Participation: 500 athletes from 40 nations

The 1994 European Athletics Indoor Championships were held in Paris, the capital city of France in between 11 and 13 March 1994. This was the last edition to feature race walking.

== Medal summary ==
=== Men ===
Event	Gold		Silver		Bronze	
60 metres	Colin Jackson (GBR)	6.49	Alexandros Terzian (GRE)	6.51	Michael Rosswess (GBR)	6.54
200 metres	Daniel Sangouma (FRA)	20.68	Vladyslav Dolohodin (UKR)	20.76	Georgios Panayotopoulos (GRE)	20.99
400 metres	Du'aine Ladejo (GBR)	46.53	Mikhail Vdovin (RUS)	46.56	Rico Lieder (GER)	46.82
800 metres	Andrey Loginov (RUS)	1:46.38	Luis Javier González (ESP)	1:46.69	Ousmane Diarra (FRA)	1:47.18
1500 metres	David Strang (GBR)	3:44.57	Branko Zorko (CRO)	3:44.64	Abdelkader Chékhémani (FRA)	3:44.65
3000 metres	Kim Bauermeister (GER)	7:52.34	Ovidiu Olteanu (ROM)	7:52.37	Rod Finch (GBR)	7:53.99
60 metres hurdles	Colin Jackson (GBR)	7.41	Gheorghe Boroi (ROM)	7.57	Mike Fenner (GER)	7.58
5000 metres walk	Mikhail Shchennikov (RUS)	18:34.32	Ronald Weigel (GER)	18:40.32	Denis Langlois (FRA)	18:43.20
High jump	Dalton Grant (GBR)	2.37	Jean-Charles Gicquel (FRA)	2.35	Wolf-Hendrik Beyer (GER)	2.33
Pole vault	Pyotr Bochkaryov (RUS)	5.90	Jean Galfione (FRA)	5.80	Igor Trandenkov (RUS)	5.75
Long jump	Dietmar Haaf (GER)	8.15	Kostas Koukodimos (GRE)	8.09	Bogdan Tudor (ROM)	8.07
Triple jump	Leonid Voloshin (RUS)	17.44	Denis Kapustin (RUS)	17.35	Vasiliy Sokov (RUS)	17.31
Shot put	Aleksandr Bagach (UKR)	20.66	Dragan Peric (IEP)	20.55	Pétur Guðmundsson (ISL)	20.04
Heptathlon	Christian Plaziat (FRA)	6268	Henrik Dagård (SWE)	6119	Alain Blondel (FRA)	6084

=== Women ===
Event	Gold		Silver		Bronze	
60 metres	Nelli Cooman (NED)	7.17	Melanie Paschke (GER)	7.19	Patricia Girard (FRA)	7.19
200 metres	Galina Malchugina (RUS)	22.41	Silke Knoll (GER)	22.96	Jacqueline Poelman (NED)	23.43
400 metres	Svetlana Goncharenko (RUS)	51.62	Tatyana Alekseyeva (RUS)	51.77	Viviane Dorsile (FRA)	51.92
800 metres	Natalya Dukhnova (BLR)	2:00.42	Ella Kovacs (ROM)	2:00.49	Carla Sacramento (POR)	2:01.12
1500 metres	Yekaterina Podkopayeva (RUS)	4:06.46	Lyudmila Rogachova (RUS)	4:06.60	Małgorzata Rydz (POL)	4:06.98
3000 metres	Fernanda Ribeiro (POR)	8:50.47	Margareta Keszeg (ROM)	8:55.61	Anna Brzezińska (POL)	8:56.90
60 metres hurdles	Yordanka Donkova (BUL)	7.85	Eva Sokolova (RUS)	7.89	Anne Piquereau (FRA)	7.91
3000 metres walk	Annarita Sidoti (ITA)	11:54.32	Beate Gummelt (GER)	11:56.01	Yelena Arshintseva (RUS)	11:57.48
High jump	Stefka Kostadinova (BUL)	1.98	Desislava Aleksandrova (BUL)	1.96	Sigrid Kirchmann (AUT)	1.96 NR
Long jump	Heike Drechsler (GER)	7.06	Ljudmila Ninova (AUT)	6.78	Inessa Kravets (UKR)	6.72
Triple jump	Inna Lasovskaya (RUS)	14.88	Anna Biryukova (RUS)	14.72	Sofiya Bozhanova (BUL)	14.52
Shot put	Astrid Kumbernuss (GER)	19.44	Larisa Peleshenko (RUS)	19.16	Svetla Mitkova (BUL)	19.09
Pentathlon	Larisa Turchinskaya (RUS)	4801	Rita Ináncsi (HUN)	4775 NR	Urszula Włodarczyk (POL)	4668

== Medal table ==
Rank	Nation	Gold	Silver	Bronze	Total
1	Russia (RUS)	9	7	3	19
2	Great Britain (GBR)	5	0	2	7
3	Germany (GER)	4	4	3	11
4	France (FRA)	2	2	7	11
5	Bulgaria (BUL)	2	1	2	5
6	Ukraine (UKR)	1	1	1	3
7	Netherlands (NED)	1	0	1	2
7	Portugal (POR)	1	0	1	2
9	Belarus (BLR)	1	0	0	1
9	Italy (ITA)	1	0	0	1
11	Romania (ROM)	0	4	1	5
12	Greece (GRE)	0	2	1	3
13	Austria (AUT)	0	1	1	2
14	Croatia (CRO)	0	1	0	1
14	Hungary (HUN)	0	1	0	1
14	Independent European Participants (IEP)	0	1	0	1
14	Spain (ESP)	0	1	0	1
14	Sweden (SWE)	0	1	0	1
19	Poland (POL)	0	0	3	3
20	Iceland (ISL)	0	0	1	1
Totals (20 entries)		27	27	27	81

- ^{nb} Athletes of the Federal Republic of Yugoslavia competed as Independent European Participants (IEP).

== Participating nations ==
- Armenia (2)
- Austria (8)
- Belarus (12)
- Belgium (18)
- Bosnia and Herzegovina (1)
- Bulgaria (13)
- Croatia (2)
- Cyprus (1)
- Czech Republic (18)
- Denmark (4)
- Estonia (4)
- Finland (11)
- France (47)
- Georgia (1)
- Germany (55)
- Great Britain (31)
- Greece (11)
- Hungary (10)
- Independent European Participants (3)
- Iceland (2)
- Ireland (4)
- Israel (4)
- Italy (29)
- Latvia (6)
- Lithuania (3)
- Macedonia (1)
- Moldova (6)
- Netherlands (12)
- Norway (7)
- Poland (13)
- Portugal (9)
- Romania (20)
- Russia (42)
- Slovakia (6)
- Slovenia (4)
- Spain (26)
- Sweden (23)
- Switzerland (9)
- Turkey (4)
- Ukraine (18)

== See also ==
- 1994 in athletics (track and field)
