= Caren Sonn =

German hurdler

Personal information
- Born: 18 January 1968 (age 58) Ulm, West Germany

Sport
- Sport: Track and field

Caren Sonn (née Jung; born 18 January 1968) is a retired German hurdler.

She represented the sports club MTG Mannheim, and became German champion in 1995 and 1998. Her personal best time was 12.88 seconds, achieved in August 1997 in Bitburg.

== Achievements ==
Year	Tournament	Venue	Result	Extra
1996	European Indoor Championships	Stockholm, Sweden	6th	60 m hurdles
1998	European Indoor Championships	Valencia, Spain	6th	60 m hurdles
