= Michelle Freeman =

Jamaican track & field athlete

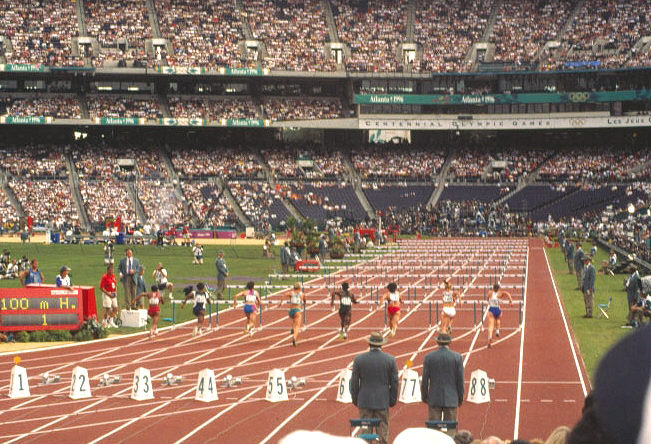
- Michelle Freeman (lane 5) at the 1996 Summer Olympics 100-meter hurdles semi-final

Personal information
- Nationality: Jamaica
- Born: 5 May 1969 (age 57) Saint Catherine Parish, Jamaica
- Height: 5 ft 7 in (1.70 m)
- Weight: 139 lb (63 kg)

Sport
- Sport: Track and field
- Event(s): 100 meters hurdles, 100 meters
- College team: University of Florida
Medal record
Women's athletics
Representing Jamaica
Olympic Games
Bronze medal – third place	1996 Atlanta	4 × 100 m relay
World Championships
Bronze medal – third place	1993 Stuttgart	4 × 100 m relay
Bronze medal – third place	1997 Athens	100 m hurdles
Commonwealth Games
Gold medal – first place	1994 Victoria	100 m hurdles
World Indoor Championships
Gold medal – first place	1997 Paris	60 m hurdles
Silver medal – second place	2001 Lisbon	60 m hurdles
CARIFTA Games Junior (U20)
Gold medal – first place	1988 Kingston	100 m
Gold medal – first place	1988 Kingston	100 m hurdles
Bronze medal – third place	1987 Port of Spain	100 m hurdles

Michelle Freeman (born 5 May 1969) is a former Jamaican track & field athlete who was an Olympic bronze medalist.

Freeman was born in Saint Catherine Parish, Jamaica where she attended St. Jago High School. In 1988, she was awarded the Austin Sealy Trophy for the most outstanding athlete of the 1988 CARIFTA Games. She received an athletic scholarship to attend the University of Florida in Gainesville, Florida, where she was a member of the Florida Gators track and field team in National Collegiate Athletic Association (NCAA) competition from 1989 to 1992. She was seven-time Southeastern Conference (SEC) champion and a member of the Gators' NCAA championship 4 × 400-meter relay team. Freeman received eight All-American honors, and still retains the Gators' team records in the 55-meter hurdles, 55-meter dash, 100-meter dash and 100-meter hurdles. She was inducted into the University of Florida Athletic Hall of Fame as a "Gator Great" in 2011.

Freeman received the gold medal for winning the 100-meter hurdles at the 1994 Commonwealth Games in Victoria, British Columbia. She competed for Jamaica at the 1996 Summer Olympics in Atlanta, Georgia, where she won the bronze medal with her teammates Juliet Cuthbert, Nikole Mitchell and Merlene Ottey in the women's 4 × 100-meter relay event. She was also a member of the Jamaican Olympic team in 1992 and 2000.

== See also ==
- List of Olympic medalists in athletics (women)
- List of University of Florida alumni
- List of University of Florida Athletic Hall of Fame members
- List of University of Florida Olympians
