= Jamaica at the 2015 World Championships in Athletics =

- WA code: JAM

in Beijing
- Competitors: 50
- Medals Ranked 2nd: Gold 7 Silver 2 Bronze 3 Total 12

World Championships in Athletics appearances
- 1983; 1987; 1991; 1993; 1995; 1997; 1999; 2001; 2003; 2005; 2007; 2009; 2011; 2013; 2015; 2017; 2019; 2022; 2023; 2025

Jamaica competed at the 2015 World Championships in Athletics in Beijing, China, from 22 to 30 August 2015.

== Medalists ==
The following competitors from Jamaica won medals at the Championships

Medal	Athlete	Event	Date
Gold	Usain Bolt	Men's 100 metres	23 August
Gold	Shelly-Ann Fraser-Pryce	Women's 100 metres	24 August
Gold	Usain Bolt	Men's 200 metres	27 August
Gold	Danielle Williams	Women's 100 metres hurdles	28 August
Gold	Veronica Campbell-Brown; Natasha Morrison; Elaine Thompson; Shelly-Ann Fraser-Pryce; Sherone Simpson; Kerron Stewart	Women's 4 × 100 metres relay	29 August
Gold	Nesta Carter; Asafa Powell; Nickel Ashmeade; Usain Bolt; Rasheed Dwyer	Men's 4 × 100 metres relay	29 August
Gold	Christine Day; Shericka Jackson; Stephenie Ann McPherson; Novlene Williams-Mills; Anastasia Le-Roy; Chrisann Gordon	Women's 4 × 400 metres relay	30 August
Silver	Hansle Parchment	Men's 110 metres hurdles	28 August
Silver	Elaine Thompson	Women's 200 metres	28 August
Bronze	O'Dayne Richards	Men's Shot put	23 August
Bronze	Shericka Jackson	Women's 400 metres	27 August
Bronze	Veronica Campbell-Brown	Women's 200 metres	28 August

== Results ==
(q – qualified, NM – no mark, SB – season best)

=== Men ===
Track and road events

Athlete	Event	Heat		Semifinal		Final	
Athlete	Event	Result	Rank	Result	Rank	Result	Rank
Nickel Ashmeade	100 metres	10.19	2 Q	10.06	6	Did not advance	
Usain Bolt	100 metres	9.96	1 Q	9.96	1 Q	9.79 SB	1st place, gold medalist(s)
Asafa Powell	100 metres	9.95	1 Q	9.97	2 Q	10.00	7
Nickel Ashmeade	200 metres	20.40	3 Q	20.19	2 Q	20.33	8
Usain Bolt	200 metres	20.28	1 Q	19.95 SB	1 Q	19.55 WL	1st place, gold medalist(s)
Julian Forte	200 metres	20.16	2 Q	20.57	8	Did not advance	
Warren Weir	200 metres	20.24 SB	2 Q	20.43	7	Did not advance	
Javon Francis	400 metres	44.83	2 Q	44.77	4	Did not advance	
Peter Matthews	400 metres	44.69 PB	4 q	45.42	8	Did not advance	
Rusheen McDonald	400 metres	43.93 NR	2 Q	44.86	6	Did not advance	
Kemoy Campbell	5000 metres	14:00.55	15	—N/a		Did not advance	
Omar McLeod	110 metres hurdles	13.43	2 Q	13.14	2 Q	13.18	6
Hansle Parchment	110 metres hurdles	13.33	1 Q	13.16	2 Q	13.03 SB	2nd place, silver medalist(s)
Andrew Riley	110 metres hurdles	13.43	2 Q	13.43	5	Did not advance	
Roxroy Cato	400 metres hurdles	49.47	6	Did not advance			
Leford Green	400 metres hurdles	49.33	5 q	49.59	6	Did not advance	
Annsert Whyte	400 metres hurdles	49.10	4 Q	48.90 SB	7	Did not advance	
Nesta Carter; Asafa Powell; Nickel Ashmeade; Usain Bolt; Rasheed Dwyer*	4 × 100 metres relay	37.41 SB	1 Q	—N/a		37.36 WL	1st place, gold medalist(s)
Peter Matthews; Ricardo Chambers; Rusheen McDonald; Javon Francis; Dane Hyatt*	4 × 400 metres relay	2:58.69 SB	3 Q	—N/a		2:58.51 SB	4

Field events

Athlete	Event	Qualification		Final	
Athlete	Event	Distance	Position	Distance	Position
Damar Forbes	Long jump	7.62	26	Did not advance	
O'Dayne Richards	Shot put	20.55	6	21.69 =NR	3rd place, bronze medalist(s)
Fedrick Dacres	Discus throw	65.77	1 Q	64.22	7
Jason Morgan	Discus throw	60.85	22	Did not advance	
Chad Wright	Discus throw	61.53	17	Did not advance	

=== Women ===
Track and road events

Athlete	Event	Heat		Semifinal		Final	
Athlete	Event	Result	Rank	Result	Rank	Result	Rank
Veronica Campbell-Brown	100 metres	11.04	2 Q	10.89 SB	2 Q	10.91	4
Shelly-Ann Fraser-Pryce	100 metres	10.88	1 Q	10.82	1 Q	10.76	1st place, gold medalist(s)
Natasha Morrison	100 metres	11.08	2 Q	10.96 PB	3 q	11.02	7
Sherone Simpson	100 metres	11.22	3 Q	11.06	4	Did not advance	
Veronica Campbell-Brown	200 metres	22.79	1 Q	22.47 SB	3 q	21.97 SB	3rd place, bronze medalist(s)
Sherone Simpson	200 metres	22.52 SB	2 Q	22.53	2 Q	22.50 SB	8
Elaine Thompson	200 metres	22.78	1 Q	22.13	1 Q	21.66 PB	2nd place, silver medalist(s)
Christine Day	400 metres	50.58	1 Q	50.82	2 Q	50.14 PB	4
Shericka Jackson	400 metres	50.41	2 Q	50.03 PB	2 Q	49.99 PB	3rd place, bronze medalist(s)
Stephenie Ann McPherson	400 metres	50.34 SB	1 Q	50.32 SB	2 Q	50.42	5
Novlene Williams-Mills	400 metres	51.07 SB	2 Q	50.47 SB	3 q	50.47 SB	6
Simoya Campbell	800 metres	2:01.43	5	Did not advance			
Natoya Goule	800 metres	2:02.37	4	Did not advance			
Kimberly Laing	100 metres hurdles	13.10	6 q	13.00	5	Did not advance	
Danielle Williams	100 metres hurdles	12.77	1 Q	12.58 PB	1 Q	12.57 PB	1st place, gold medalist(s)
Shermaine Williams	100 metres hurdles	12.78 PB	2 Q	12.86	2 Q	12.95	7
Janieve Russell	400 metres hurdles	55.09	1 Q	54.78 SB	2 Q	54.64 PB	5
Kaliese Spencer	400 metres hurdles	55.03	1 Q	54.45	2 Q	55.47	8
Shevon Stoddart	400 metres hurdles	56.60	5	Did not advance			
Ristananna Tracey	400 metres hurdles	57.60	7	Did not advance			
Aisha Praught	3000 metres steeplechase	DQ		—N/a		Did not advance	
Veronica Campbell-Brown; Shelly-Ann Fraser-Pryce; Natasha Morrison; Elaine Thompson; Sherone Simpson*; Kerron Stewart*	4 × 100 metres relay	41.84 WL	1 Q	—N/a		41.07 CR, WL, NR	1st place, gold medalist(s)
Christine Day; Shericka Jackson; Stephenie Ann McPherson; Novlene Williams-Mills; Chrisann Gordon*; Anastasia Le-Roy*	4 × 400 metres relay	3:23.62	2 Q	—N/a		3:19.13 WL	1st place, gold medalist(s)

Field events

Athlete	Event	Qualification		Final	
Athlete	Event	Distance	Position	Distance	Position
Shanieka Thomas	Triple jump	14.05	8 q	14.08	11
Kimberly Williams	Triple jump	14.23	6 q	14.45 SB	5
Danniel Thomas	Shot put	16.62	22	Did not advance	

Combined events – Heptathlon

Athlete	Event	100H	HJ	SP	200 m	LJ	JT	800 m	Final	Rank
Salcia Slack	Result	13.98	1.62 SB	13.53	24.73	5.54	36.11	DNS	DNF	
Salcia Slack	Points	981	759	763	912	712	593	DNS	DNF	

== Sources ==
- Jamaican team
