= Athletics at the 2016 Summer Olympics – Women's 100 metres hurdles =

Women's 100 metres hurdles at the Games of the XXXI Olympiad
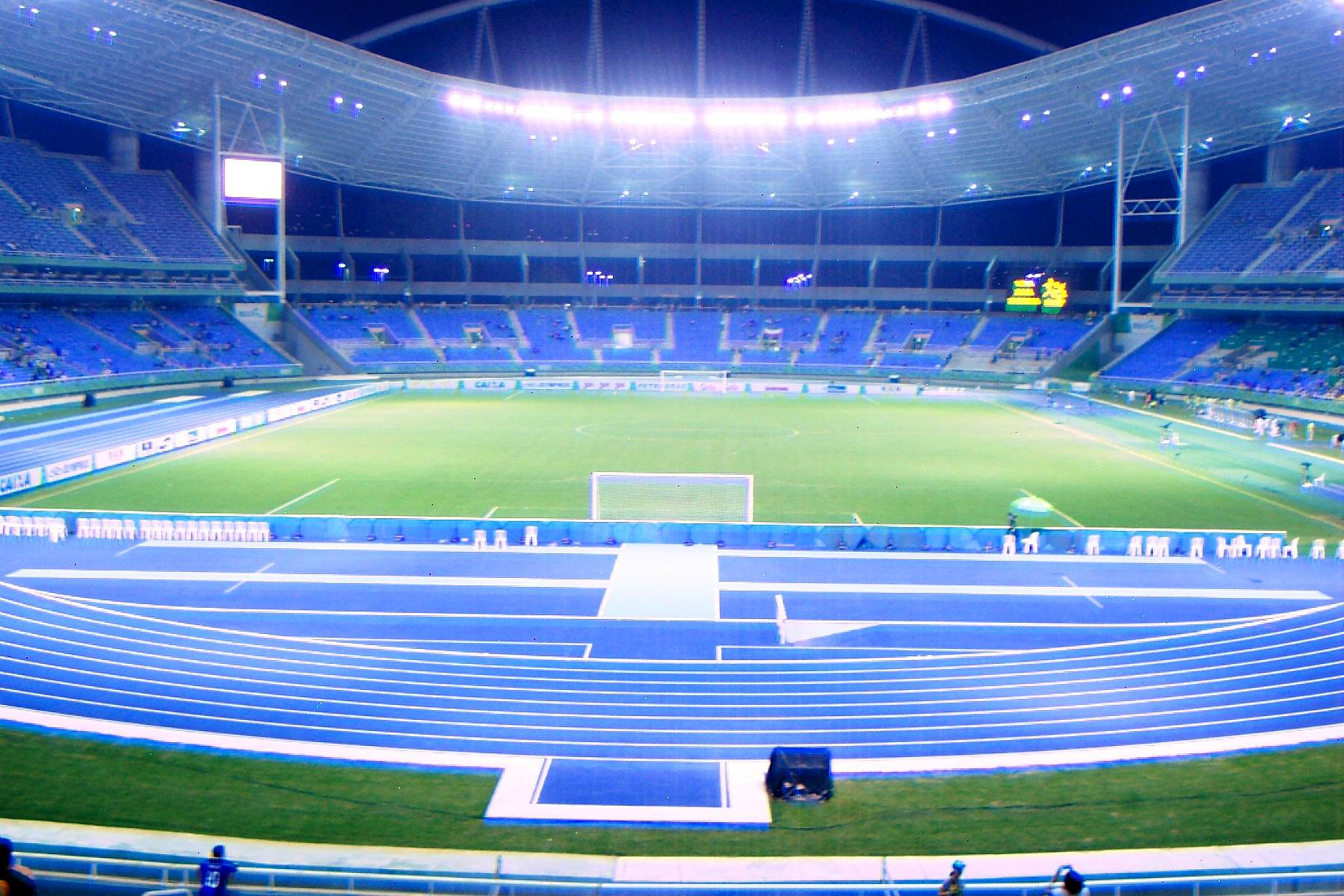
- Interior view of the Estádio Olímpico João Havelange, where the Women's 100m hurdles took place.
- Venue: Olympic Stadium
- Dates: 16 August 2016 (heats); 17 August 2016 (semifinals & final)
- Competitors: 48 from 34 nations
- Winning time: 12.48

Medalists
1st place, gold medalist(s)		Brianna Rollins	United States
2nd place, silver medalist(s)		Nia Ali	United States
3rd place, bronze medalist(s)		Kristi Castlin	United States

Official Video Highlights

The women's 100 metres hurdles event at the 2016 Summer Olympics took place between 16–17 August at the Olympic Stadium.

== Summary ==
The United States came into this event with the top 25 performances and top 7 athletes in the world in 2016. But only three athletes can come from one country. World #1 Kendra Harrison failed to qualify at the United States Olympic Trials. Three weeks after the trials, she set the world record, surpassing Yordanka Donkova's 28 year old mark. World #4 Jasmin Stowers, #6 Queen Harrison and #7 Sharika Nelvis also were beaten at the Trials.

The semi-finals foretold the dominance of the American team as they each won one of the three semi finals. In the final, Brianna Rollins had already achieved the lead by the first hurdle and by the second hurdle it was clear her closest pursuer was Nia Ali. Sisters Cindy Ofili and Tiffany Porter, American born but competing for Great Britain, their mother's homeland, were even in the third-place position. By the fourth barrier, Kristi Castlin was in a battle for last place with Phylicia George and Cindy Roleder, half a stride behind Rollins. Between the fourth and sixth hurdles, Castlin got rolling, gaining and then passing Pedrya Seymour, Porter and finally over the last hurdle, Ofili. Rollins had a clear one metre victory. On the run in, Castlin came very close to Ali as Ofili gave her best desperate lean.

It was an American sweep. The United States has swept the men's 110 metres hurdles six times, this was the first time for women and the first time the women's event has been swept by any country. It was also the first time that the United States has swept the medals in an Olympic women's track and field event.

The following evening the medals were presented by Paul Tergat, IOC member, Kenya and Stephanie Hightower, Council Member of the IAAF.

== Competition format ==
The women's 100m Hurdles competition consisted of heats (Round 1), Semifinals and a Final. The fastest competitors from each race in the heats qualified for the Semifinals along with the fastest overall competitors not already qualified that were required to fill the available spaces in the Semifinals. A total of eight competitors qualified for the Final from the Semifinals.

== Records ==
Prior to the competition, the existing World and Olympic records were as follows.

World record	Kendra Harrison (USA)	12.20	London, United Kingdom	22 July 2016
Olympic record	Sally Pearson (AUS)	12.35	London, United Kingdom	7 August 2012
2016 World leading	Kendra Harrison (USA)	12.20	London, United Kingdom	22 July 2016

== Schedule ==
All times are Brasilia Time (UTC-3)

Date	Time	Round
Tuesday, 16 August 2016	11:05	Heats
Wednesday, 17 August 2016	20:45; 22:55	Semifinals; Finals

== Results ==
=== Heats ===
Qualification rule: first 3 of each heat (Q) plus the 6 fastest times (q) qualified.

==== Heat 1 ====
Rank	Athlete	Nation	Time	Notes
1	Kristi Castlin	United States	12.68	Q
2	Anne Zagré	Belgium	12.85	Q
3	Nooralotta Neziri	Finland	12.88	Q
4	Shermaine Williams	Jamaica	12.95	q
5	Susanna Kallur	Sweden	13.04	
6	Caridad Jerez	Spain	13.26	
7	Katy Sealy	Belize	15.79	
–	Mulern Jean	Haiti	DQ	R168.7b

==== Heat 2 ====
Rank	Athlete	Nation	Time	Notes
1	Nia Ali	United States	12.76	Q
2	Phylicia George	Canada	12.83	Q
3	Pedrya Seymour	Bahamas	12.85	Q
4	Wu Shuijiao	China	13.03	
5	Maila Machado	Brazil	13.09	
6	Michelle Jenneke	Australia	13.26	
7	Ekaterina Poplavskaya	Belarus	13.45	
8	Beate Schrott	Austria	13.47	

==== Heat 3 ====
Rank	Athlete	Nation	Time	Notes
1	Cindy Ofili	Great Britain	12.75	Q
2	Nadine Hildebrand	Germany	12.84	Q
3	Isabelle Pedersen	Norway	12.86	Q, PB
4	Andrea Ivančević	Croatia	12.90	q, SB
5	Brigitte Merlano	Colombia	13.09	
6	Angela Whyte	Canada	13.09	
7	Elisavet Pesiridou	Greece	13.10	
8	Anastassiya Pilipenko	Kazakhstan	13.29	

==== Heat 4 ====
Rank	Athlete	Nation	Time	Notes
1	Cindy Roleder	Germany	12.86	Q
2	Tiffany Porter	Great Britain	12.87	Q
3	Nickiesha Wilson	Jamaica	12.89	Q, SB
4	Clélia Reuse	Switzerland	12.91	q
5	Cindy Billaud	France	12.98	q
6	Kierre Beckles	Barbados	13.01	
7	Hanna Plotitsyna	Ukraine	13.12	
8	Marthe Koala	Burkina Faso	13.41	

==== Heat 5 ====
Rank	Athlete	Nation	Time	Notes
1	Jasmine Camacho-Quinn	Puerto Rico	12.70	Q
2	Alina Talay	Belarus	12.74	Q
3	Pamela Dutkiewicz	Germany	12.90	Q
4	Nikkita Holder	Canada	12.92	q, SB
5	Oluwatobiloba Amusan	Nigeria	12.99	q
6	Karolina Kołeczek	Poland	13.04	
7	Oksana Shkurat	Ukraine	13.22	
8	Yvette Lewis	Panama	13.35	

==== Heat 6 ====
Rank	Athlete	Nation	Time	Notes
1	Brianna Rollins	United States	12.54	Q
2	Megan Simmonds	Jamaica	12.81	Q
3	Sandra Gomis	France	13.04	Q
4	Nadine Visser	Netherlands	13.07	
5	Fabiana Moraes	Brazil	13.22	
6	Valentina Kibalnikova	Uzbekistan	13.29	
7	Olena Yanovska	Ukraine	13.32	
–	Reïna-Flor Okori	Equatorial Guinea	DNS	

=== Semifinals ===
==== Semifinal 1 ====
Rank	Athlete	Nation	Time	Notes
1	Brianna Rollins	United States	12.47	Q
2	Pedrya Seymour	Bahamas	12.64	Q, NR
3	Cindy Roleder	Germany	12.69	q
4	Tiffany Porter	Great Britain	12.82	q
5	Shermaine Williams	Jamaica	12.86	
6	Andrea Ivančević	Croatia	12.93	
7	Sandra Gomis	France	13.23	
8	Alina Talay	Belarus	13.66	

==== Semifinal 2 ====
Rank	Athlete	Nation	Time	Notes
1	Nia Ali	United States	12.65	Q
2	Phylicia George	Canada	12.77	Q
3	Oluwatobiloba Amusan	Nigeria	12.91	
4	Nadine Hildebrand	Germany	12.95	
5	Clélia Reuse	Switzerland	12.96	
6	Nooralotta Neziri	Finland	13.04	
7	Nickiesha Wilson	Jamaica	13.14	
–	Jasmine Camacho-Quinn	Puerto Rico	DQ	R168.7b

==== Semifinal 3 ====
Rank	Athlete	Nation	Time	Notes
1	Kristi Castlin	United States	12.63	Q
2	Cindy Ofili	Great Britain	12.71	Q
3	Isabelle Pedersen	Norway	12.88	
4	Pamela Dutkiewicz	Germany	12.92	
5	Megan Simmonds	Jamaica	12.95	
6	Cindy Billaud	France	13.03	
	Nikkita Holder	Canada	DQ	
	Anne Zagré	Belgium	DQ	

=== Final ===
Rank	Athlete	Nation	Time	Notes
1st place, gold medalist(s)	Brianna Rollins	United States	12.48	
2nd place, silver medalist(s)	Nia Ali	United States	12.59	
3rd place, bronze medalist(s)	Kristi Castlin	United States	12.61	
4	Cindy Ofili	Great Britain	12.63	SB
5	Cindy Roleder	Germany	12.74	
6	Pedrya Seymour	Bahamas	12.76	
7	Tiffany Porter	Great Britain	12.76	
8	Phylicia George	Canada	12.89	
