= Track and field at the 2011 Military World Games – Women's 100 metres hurdles =

The women's 100 metres hurdles event at the 2011 Military World Games was held on 21 and 22 July at the Estádio Olímpico João Havelange.

== Records ==
Prior to this competition, the existing world and CISM record were as follows:

World Record	Yordanka Donkova (BUL)	12.21	Stara Zagora, Bulgaria	20 August 1988
CISM World Record				

== Schedule ==
Date	Time	Round
21 July 2011		Semifinals
22 July 2011	09:10	Final

== Medalists ==
Gold	Silver	Bronze
Alina Talay; Belarus	Veronica Borsi; Italy	Ekaterina Poplavskaya; Belarus

== Results ==
=== Final ===
Wind: +0.3 m/s

Rank	Lane	Name	Nationality	Time	Notes
1st place, gold medalist(s)	8	Alina Talay	Belarus	12.95	CR
2nd place, silver medalist(s)	5	Veronica Borsi	Italy	13.08	PB
3rd place, bronze medalist(s)	6	Ekaterina Poplavskaya	Belarus	13.12	
4	4	Yevhenila Snihur	Ukraine	13.28	
5	3	Micol Cattaneo	Italy	13.32	
6	7	Martina Valoyes Serna	Colombia	14.46	
7	2	Lina Paula Caicedo Gonzalez	Colombia	15.10	
