= 2009 European Athletics U23 Championships – Women's 100 metres hurdles =

The women's 100 metres hurdles event at the 2009 European Athletics U23 Championships was held in Kaunas, Lithuania, at S. Dariaus ir S. Girėno stadionas (Darius and Girėnas Stadium) on 17 and 18 July.

== Medalists ==
Gold	Christina Vukicevic; Norway
Silver	Yekaterina Shtepa; Russia
Bronze	Alina Talay; Belarus

== Results ==
=== Final ===
18 July
Wind: -2.0 m/s

Rank	Name	Nationality	Time	Notes
1st place, gold medalist(s)	Christina Vukicevic	Norway	12.99	
2nd place, silver medalist(s)	Yekaterina Shtepa	Russia	13.28	
3rd place, bronze medalist(s)	Alina Talay	Belarus	13.30	
4	Katsiaryna Paplauskaya	Belarus	13.32	
5	Sonata Tamošaitytė	Lithuania	13.36	
6	Lisa Urech	Switzerland	13.41	
7	Anne-Kathrin Elbe	Germany	13.45	
8	Galina Ivanchenko	Russia	13.48	

=== Semifinals ===
17 July
Qualified: first 3 in each heat and 2 best to the Final

==== Semifinal 1 ====
Wind: 0.1 m/s

Rank	Name	Nationality	Time	Notes
1	Christina Vukicevic	Norway	13.05	Q
2	Alina Talay	Belarus	13.07	Q
3	Sonata Tamošaitytė	Lithuania	13.10	Q
4	Zara Hohn	United Kingdom	13.39	
5	Solène Hamelin	France	13.43	
6	Cindy Roleder	Germany	13.50	
7	Clélia Reuse	Switzerland	13.60	
8	Tatyana Filatova	Russia	13.72	

==== Semifinal 2 ====
Wind: 0.3 m/s

Rank	Name	Nationality	Time	Notes
1	Yekaterina Shtepa	Russia	13.15	Q
2	Galina Ivanchenko	Russia	13.26	Q
3	Katsiaryna Paplauskaya	Belarus	13.31	Q
4	Anne-Kathrin Elbe	Germany	13.34	q
5	Lisa Urech	Switzerland	13.39	q
6	Beate Schrott	Austria	13.48	
7	Veronica Borsi	Italy	13.54	
8	Ana Torrijos	Spain	13.57	

=== Heats ===
17 July
Qualified: first 3 in each heat and 4 best to the Semifinals

==== Heat 1 ====
Wind: -0.9 m/s

Rank	Name	Nationality	Time	Notes
1	Sonata Tamošaitytė	Lithuania	13.45	Q
2	Katsiaryna Paplauskaya	Belarus	13.46	Q
3	Tatyana Filatova	Russia	13.68	Q
4	Giia Lindström	Finland	13.69	
5	Aisseta Diawara	France	13.70	
6	Marie Hagle	Norway	13.73	
7	Giulia Pennella	Italy	13.85	
8	Sara Strajnar	Slovenia	14.27	

==== Heat 2 ====
Wind: -0.9 m/s

Rank	Name	Nationality	Time	Notes
1	Christina Vukicevic	Norway	13.12	Q
2	Anne-Kathrin Elbe	Germany	13.33	Q
3	Galina Ivanchenko	Russia	13.48	Q
4	Clélia Reuse	Switzerland	13.51	q
5	Veronica Borsi	Italy	13.64	q
6	Annimari Korte	Finland	13.84	
7	Anne Møller	Denmark	14.02	

==== Heat 3 ====
Wind: 0.0 m/s

Rank	Name	Nationality	Time	Notes
1	Yekaterina Shtepa	Russia	13.37	Q
2	Solène Hamelin	France	13.38	Q
3	Cindy Roleder	Germany	13.42	Q
4	Zara Hohn	United Kingdom	13.46	q
5	Beate Schrott	Austria	13.52	q
6	Sara Balduchelli	Italy	13.84	
7	Petra Fontanive	Switzerland	14.16	
8	Estefanía Fortes	Spain	14.45	

==== Heat 4 ====
Wind: -0.3 m/s

Rank	Name	Nationality	Time	Notes
1	Lisa Urech	Switzerland	13.28	Q
2	Alina Talay	Belarus	13.32	Q
3	Ana Torrijos	Spain	13.71	Q
4	Andreea Radu	Romania	13.72	
5	Dimitra Arachoviti	Cyprus	13.89	
6	Stefanie Saumweber	Germany	13.90	
7	Hege Vold	Norway	13.97	
8	Arna Erega	Croatia	14.07	

== Participation ==
According to an unofficial count, 31 athletes from 17 countries participated in the event.

- Austria (1)
- Belarus (2)
- Croatia (1)
- Cyprus (1)
- Denmark (1)
- Finland (2)
- France (2)
- Germany (3)
- Italy (3)
- Lithuania (1)
- Norway (3)
- Romania (1)
- Russia (3)
- Slovenia (1)
- Spain (2)
- Switzerland (3)
- United Kingdom (1)
