= Athletics at the 2011 Summer Universiade – Women's 100 metres hurdles =

The women's 100 metres hurdles event at the 2011 Summer Universiade was held on 18–19 August.

== Medalists ==
| Gold | Silver | Bronze |
|---|---|---|
| Nia Ali; United States | Natalya Ivoninskaya; Kazakhstan | Christina Manning; United States |

== Results ==
=== Heats ===
Qualification: First 4 of each heat (Q) and the next 4 fastest (q) qualified for the semifinals.

Wind:
Heat 1: +0.7 m/s, Heat 2: -0.3 m/s, Heat 3: -0.1 m/s, Heat 4: -1.0 m/s, Heat 5: -0.3 m/s

| Rank | Heat | Name | Nationality | Time | Notes |
|---|---|---|---|---|---|
| 1 | 5 | Nia Ali | United States | 13.08 | Q |
| 2 | 2 | Christina Manning | United States | 13.23 | Q |
| 3 | 1 | Svetlana Topilina | Russia | 13.26 | Q |
| 4 | 1 | Indira Spence | Jamaica | 13.29 | Q |
| 5 | 1 | Natalya Ivoninskaya | Kazakhstan | 13.29 | Q |
| 6 | 3 | Anastasia Solovyeva | Russia | 13.30 | Q |
| 7 | 3 | Beate Schrott | Austria | 13.31 | Q |
| 7 | 4 | Nevin Yanıt | Turkey | 13.31 | Q |
| 9 | 5 | Ekaterina Poplavskaya | Belarus | 13.33 | Q |
| 10 | 4 | Christie Gordon | Canada | 13.39 | Q |
| 11 | 2 | Sonata Tamošaitytė | Lithuania | 13.40 | Q |
| 12 | 2 | Veronica Borsi | Italy | 13.47 | Q |
| 13 | 3 | Gemma Bennett | Great Britain | 13.50 | Q |
| 14 | 5 | Giia Lindstrom | Finland | 13.56 | Q |
| 15 | 2 | Deng Ru | China | 13.58 | Q |
| 16 | 4 | Shermaine Williams | Jamaica | 13.60 | Q |
| 17 | 4 | Anastassiya Soprunova | Kazakhstan | 13.61 | Q |
| 18 | 5 | Marlen Affentranger | Switzerland | 13.62 | Q |
| 19 | 1 | Ashley Helsby | Great Britain | 13.74 | Q |
| 20 | 3 | Marie-Eve Dugas | Canada | 13.86 | Q |
| 21 | 2 | Shannon McCann | Australia | 13.87 | q |
| 22 | 3 | Airi Ito | Japan | 13.93 | q |
| 23 | 1 | Wallapa Punsoongneun | Thailand | 13.99 | q |
| 24 | 1 | Sun Minjing | China | 13.99 | q |
| 25 | 4 | Tale Oerving | Norway | 14.05 | |
| 26 | 3 | Marie Hagle | Norway | 14.20 | |
| 26 | 5 | Agustina Bawele | Indonesia | 14.20 | |
| 28 | 4 | Jeimmy Bernardez | Honduras | 14.27 | |
| 29 | 3 | Dipna Prasad | Singapore | 14.39 | |
| 30 | 5 | Anne Moeller | Denmark | 14.45 | |
| 31 | 2 | Kadidiatou Loure | Burkina Faso | 14.89 | |
| 32 | 1 | Inese Nagle | Latvia | 15.20 | |
| 33 | 4 | Thulasi Weerasekara | Sri Lanka | 16.46 | |
| 34 | 2 | Poon Pakyan | Hong Kong | 16.61 | |
| 35 | 4 | Ng Nganfan | Macau | 18.00 | |
| | 5 | Anne Zagré | Belgium | DNS | |

=== Semifinals ===
Qualification: First 2 of each semifinal (Q) and the next 2 fastest (q) qualified for the final.

Wind:
Heat 1: -0.4, Heat 2: -0.7 m/s, Heat 3: +0.5 m/s

| Rank | Heat | Name | Nationality | Time | Notes |
|---|---|---|---|---|---|
| 1 | 3 | Nia Ali | United States | 12.79 | Q |
| 2 | 2 | Natalya Ivoninskaya | Kazakhstan | 13.04 | Q |
| 3 | 3 | Beate Schrott | Austria | 13.12 | Q |
| 4 | 2 | Ekaterina Poplavskaya | Belarus | 13.17 | Q |
| 5 | 1 | Svetlana Topilina | Russia | 13.19 | Q |
| 6 | 1 | Nevin Yanıt | Turkey | 13.24 | Q |
| 7 | 3 | Indira Spence | Jamaica | 13.26 | q |
| 8 | 2 | Christina Manning | United States | 13.31 | q |
| 9 | 1 | Christie Gordon | Canada | 13.33 | |
| 9 | 2 | Anastasia Solovyeva | Russia | 13.33 | |
| 11 | 1 | Sonata Tamošaitytė | Lithuania | 13.37 | |
| 12 | 1 | Deng Ru | China | 13.42 | |
| 13 | 1 | Shermaine Williams | Jamaica | 13.42 | |
| 14 | 3 | Anastassiya Soprunova | Kazakhstan | 13.43 | |
| 15 | 3 | Gemma Bennett | Great Britain | 13.47 | |
| 16 | 1 | Airi Ito | Japan | 13.56 | |
| 16 | 3 | Veronica Borsi | Italy | 13.56 | |
| 18 | 3 | Marie-Eve Dugas | Canada | 13.60 | |
| 19 | 2 | Ashley Helsby | Great Britain | 13.67 | |
| 20 | 1 | Shannon McCann | Australia | 13.83 | |
| 21 | 2 | Marlen Affentranger | Switzerland | 13.89 | |
| 22 | 3 | Sun Minjing | China | 14.09 | |
| | 2 | Giia Lindstrom | Finland | DNF | |
| | 2 | Wallapa Punsoongneun | Thailand | DNS | |

=== Final ===
Wind: -1.3 m/s

| Rank | Lane | Name | Nationality | Time | Notes |
|---|---|---|---|---|---|
| 1st place, gold medalist(s) | 6 | Nia Ali | United States | 12.85 | |
| 2nd place, silver medalist(s) | 7 | Natalya Ivoninskaya | Kazakhstan | 13.16 | |
| 3rd place, bronze medalist(s) | 2 | Christina Manning | United States | 13.17 | |
| 4 | 5 | Svetlana Topilina | Russia | 13.23 | |
| 5 | 8 | Ekaterina Poplavskaya | Belarus | 13.24 | |
| 6 | 9 | Nevin Yanıt | Turkey | 13.27 | |
| 7 | 4 | Beate Schrott | Austria | 13.34 | |
| | 3 | Indira Spence | Jamaica | DNS | |
