= Clélia Rard-Reuse =

Swiss track and field athlete

Personal information
- Born: Clélia Reuse; 1 August 1988 (age 37) Riddes, VS
- Height: 1.73 m (5 ft 8 in)
- Weight: 57 kg (126 lb)

Sport
- Country: Switzerland
- Sport: Athletics
- Event(s): 100m hurdles, 100m, long jump

Clélia Rard-Reuse (born 1 August 1988 in Riddes, Valais) is a Swiss athlete specialising in the sprint hurdles.

She was an unused reserve runner in the 4 × 100 metres relay at the 2012 Summer Olympics.

== International competitions ==
Year	Competition	Venue	Position	Event	Notes
Representing Switzerland
2005	European Junior Championships	Lignano Sabbiadoro, Italy	1st	100 m hurdles	13.74
2005	European Junior Championships	Lignano Sabbiadoro, Italy	2nd	Long jump	6.36 m
2007	European Junior Championships	Hengelo, Netherlands	12th (h)	100 m hurdles	14.07
2007	European Junior Championships	Hengelo, Netherlands	7th	4 × 100 m relay	46.51
2007	European Junior Championships	Hengelo, Netherlands	16th (q)	Long jump	5.75 m
2006	World Junior Championships	Beijing, China	28th (h)	100 m hurdles	14.14
2009	European U23 Championships	Kaunas, Lithuania	15th (sf)	100 m hurdles	13.60
2009	European U23 Championships	Kaunas, Lithuania	10th (q)	Long jump	6.33 m (w)
2010	European Championships	Barcelona, Spain	26th (h)	100 m hurdles	13.73
2011	European Indoor Championships	Paris, France	17th (h)	60 m hurdles	8.24
2011	World Championships	Daegu, South Korea	13th (h)	4 × 100 m relay	44.04
2012	European Championships	Helsinki, Finland	18th (h)	100 m hurdles	13.25
2013	Jeux de la Francophonie	Nice, France	3rd	100 m hurdles	13.57
2013	Jeux de la Francophonie	Nice, France	2nd	4x100 mrelay	45.01
2016	European Championships	Amsterdam, Netherlands	4th	100 m hurdles	12.96
2016	Olympic Games	Rio de Janeiro, Brazil	16th (sf)	100 m hurdles	12.96

== Personal bests ==
Outdoors

- 100 metres – 11.58 (+0.2 m/s, Thun 2016)
- 100 metres hurdles – 12.87 (+1.6 m/s, Thun 2016)
- Long jump – 6.60 (+0.5 m/s, Bulle 2011)
- Heptathlon – 5305 (Landquart 2010)

Indoors

- 60 metres hurdles – 8.14 (St. Gallen 2016)
- Long jump – 6.44 (Magglingen 2011)
