= Kendra Harrison =

American hurdler (born 1992)

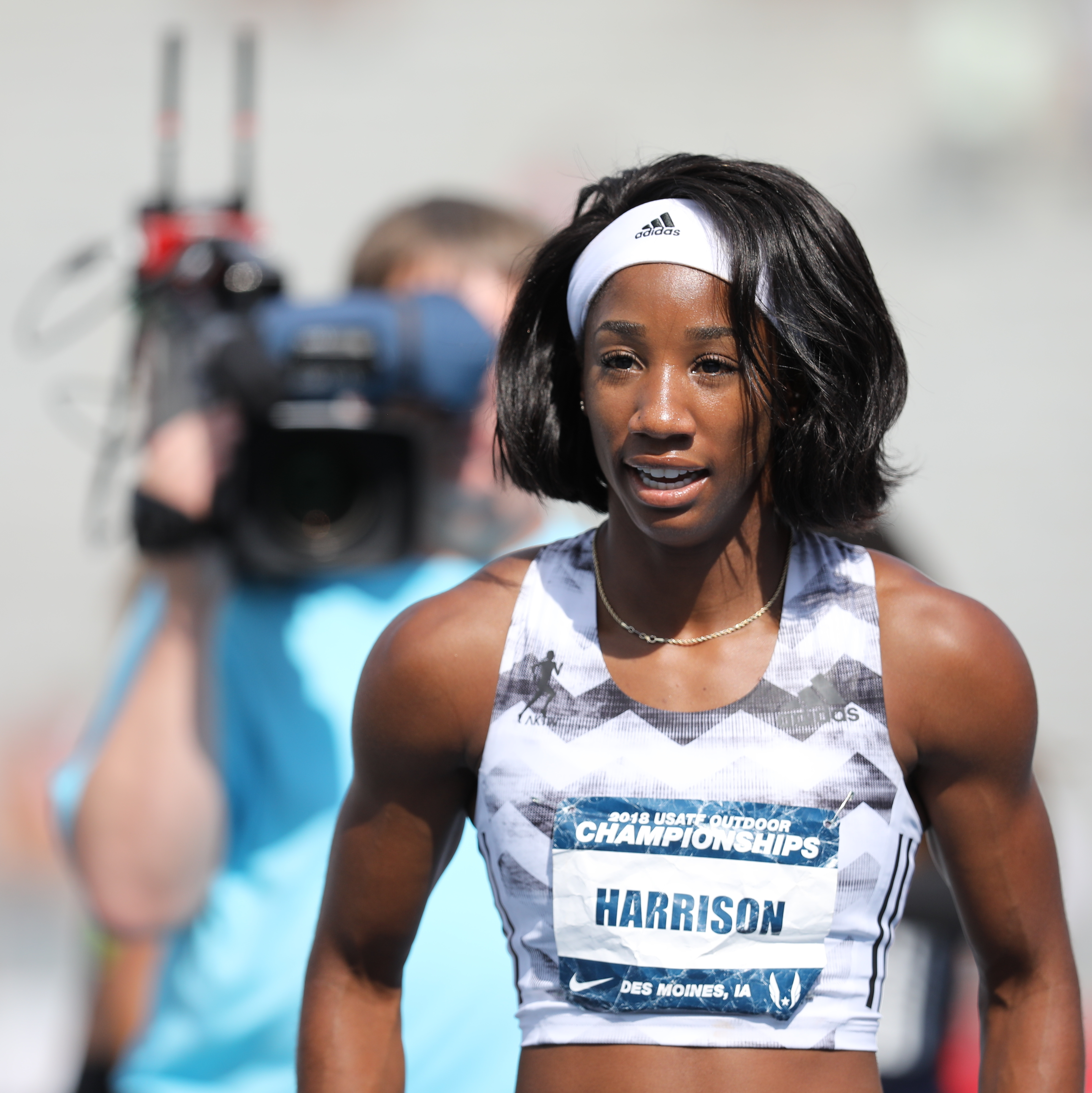
- Harrison in 2018

Personal information
- Nickname: Keni Harrison
- Born: September 18, 1992 (age 34) Tennessee, U.S.
- Home town: Clayton, North Carolina, U.S.
- Height: 5 ft 4 in (163 cm)

Sport
- Country: United States
- Sport: Track and field
- Events: 100 meters hurdles, 60 meters hurdles
- College team: Kentucky
- Team: Adidas
- Coached by: Edrick Floréal

Achievements and titles
- Personal bests: 100 m hurdles: 12.20 AR (London 2016); 400 m hurdles: 54.09 (Eugene, OR 2015); Indoors; 60 m hurdles: 7.70 AR (Birmingham 2018)
Medal record
Women's athletics
Representing the United States
Olympic Games
Silver medal – second place	2020 Tokyo	100 m hurdles
World Championships
Silver medal – second place	2019 Doha	100 m hurdles
Bronze medal – third place	2023 Budapest	100 m hurdles
World Indoor Championships
Gold medal – first place	2018 Birmingham	60 m hurdles
NACAC Championships
Gold medal – first place	2018 Toronto	100 m hurdles
Representing Americas
Continental Cup
Silver medal – second place	2018 Ostrava	100 m hurdles

Kendra "Keni" Harrison (born September 18, 1992) is an American hurdler. Harrison held the world record in the women's 100 metres hurdles with a time of 12.20 seconds, set on July 22, 2016, at the London Müller Anniversary Games, breaking the previous world record of 12.21 seconds achieved nearly 28 years earlier by Bulgarian athlete Yordanka Donkova.

In college, she competed for the University of Kentucky Wildcats and in 2015 she won NCAA championship titles both indoors and outdoors. She was runner-up in the 100 m hurdles at the 2015 USA Outdoor Championships; at the 2016 Olympic Trials she placed sixth because she tripped, and missed qualifying for the Olympics. Between the US trials and the Olympic Games, she broke the 28-year-old world record. Harrison won the 60 m hurdles at the 2018 World Indoor Championship and the 100 m hurdles at the 2018 NACAC Championships. She placed second in the 100 m hurdles at the 2019 World Championship, and at the 2020 Tokyo Olympics held in 2021.

== Career ==
=== Early life ===
Kendra Harrison was born in Tennessee on September 18, 1992, and adopted by Gary and Karon Harrison; she grew up in a large family with ten other children, eight of them also adopted. Harrison's first sport was soccer; she took up track and field at Clayton High School in Clayton, North Carolina. She soon became a leading scholastic hurdler, winning state championship titles at the 2010 and 2011 NCHSAA 4A state meets; in 2011 she also won the 100 m hurdles at the New Balance Nationals and was named Gatorade North Carolina Girls Track & Field Athlete of the Year.

=== College athletics ===
After graduating from Clayton High in 2011 Harrison went to Clemson University; as a freshman in 2012 she was Atlantic Coast Conference champion in the 400 m hurdles and the 4 × 400 m relay and qualified for the NCAA championships in both hurdles races. She competed in the 2012 Olympic Trials in the 100 m hurdles but was eliminated in the heats. In 2013, she placed fifth in the 100 m hurdles (12.88) and fourth in the 400 m hurdles (55.75) at the NCAA outdoor championships.

Harrison transferred from Clemson to the University of Kentucky after the 2013 season, together with sprinter Dezerea Bryant and coach Tim Hall. She continued to develop, winning both the 100 m hurdles (12.86) and the 400 m hurdles (54.76) at the 2014 Southeastern Conference (SEC) championships; she was the first athlete to win both events since 1999. She entered the NCAA outdoor championships as the leading favorite and collegiate leader in the 400 m hurdles, but failed to match her personal best and lost to Texas A&M's Shamier Little; in the 100 m hurdles she placed fifth for the second consecutive year.

Harrison injured her hamstring in the winter of 2014–15 and missed the early part of the 2015 indoor season. She returned in time to win the 60 m hurdles at the SEC and NCAA indoor championships, setting personal bests in both meets; her time in the NCAA meet (7.87 seconds) ranked her fourth in the world that indoor season. Harrison also won her first outdoor NCAA title in 2015, winning the 100 m hurdles in 12.55; in the 400 m hurdles she placed second to Little in a personal best 54.09, at that point the second-fastest in the world that year.

In November 2015, Harrison was named as a 2016 recipient of the NCAA's Today's Top 10 Award, presented annually to 10 individuals who completed their athletic eligibility in the previous school year "for successes on the field, in the classroom and in the community."

=== Professional ===
Following her graduation, University of Kentucky coach Edrick Floréal continued to train her. At the 2015 United States championships, which doubled as trials for the World Championships in Beijing, Harrison decided to concentrate on the 100 m hurdles only; she set a personal all-conditions best of 12.46w in the heats and ran a wind-legal 12.56 in the final, placing a close second to 2008 Olympic Champion Dawn Harper-Nelson and qualifying for the American team. The Americans were heavy favorites for the world championships, but underperformed; Harrison had a false start in the semi-finals and was disqualified.

Harrison opened her 2016 indoor season winning the 60 metres hurdles in Lexington, Kentucky, Karlsruhe, Germany and Glasgow in 7.92. In a tightly competed race at the 2016 USA Indoor Track and Field Championships, Harrison took second place by one hundredth of a second to Brianna Rollins, setting a personal record of 7.77 seconds and moving herself into 13th place on the all-time lists. At the 2016 IAAF World Indoor Championships one week later, Harrison led the qualifying with 7.81 seconds. However, in the final she hit the first hurdle heavily and never recovered, ending in eighth while Nia Ali (the least favoured American) took the title.

She began the outdoor season in April with the fastest opener recorded by a hurdler, 12.36 seconds, to go up to ninth on the all-time lists. A run of 12.42 followed at the start of May. Then at the Prefontaine Classic in late May she perfectly cleared all the hurdles and won in a time of 12.24 seconds – the second fastest time in history after Yordanka Donkova's world record of 12.21 from 1988. She was favored to win the 100 m hurdles at the 2016 United States Olympic Trials in early July, but only placed sixth in 12.62 and missed qualifying for the 2016 Summer Olympics in Rio de Janeiro; the three spots on the American Olympic team went to Rollins, Kristi Castlin and Ali.

Harrison broke the 100 m hurdles world record on July 22, 2016, at the London Müller Anniversary Games, running 12.20 (+0.3 m/s) to lower Donkova's mark by one one-hundredth of a second; Rollins, Castlin and Ali placed second, third and fourth in the race. The trackside clock in the record race initially stopped at 12.58, the unadjusted time of runner-up Rollins, as Harrison ducked under the timing beam at the finish line.

In 2021, Harrison finally qualified for her first Olympics. On August 2, 2021, she won the silver medal in the 100 meter hurdles at the 2020 Tokyo Games.

== Achievements ==
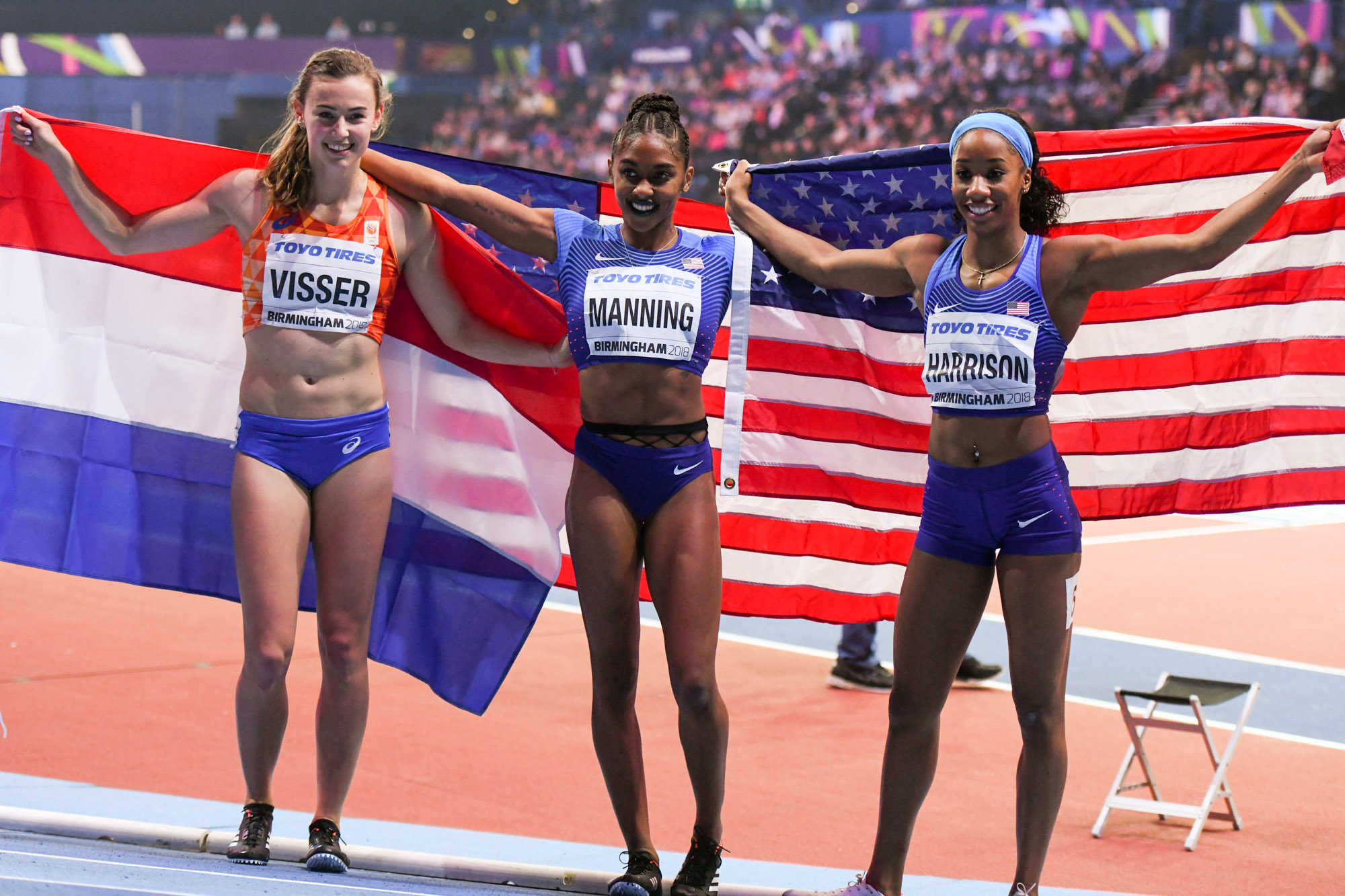
Harrison (R) celebrates her 60 m hurdles victory at the 2018 World Indoor Championships held in Birmingham.

=== Circuit performances ===
Grand Slam Track results
Slam	Race group	Event	Pl.	Time	Prize money
2025 Miami Slam	Short hurdles	100 m hurdles	4th	12.40	US$20,000
2025 Miami Slam	Short hurdles	100 m	3rd	11.35	US$20,000

=== Personal bests ===
- 60 m hurdles – 7.70 (Birmingham 2018) =North American record
- 60 meters – 7.23 (Houston, TX 2020)

- 100 m hurdles – 12.20 (London 2016) North American record
- 100 meters – 11.35 (Lexington, KY 2016)
- 200 meters – 22.81 (+1.5 m/s, Gainesville, FL 2018) (also 22.19 w)
  - 200 meters indoor – 23.10 (Lubbock, TX 2019)
- 300 m hurdles – 41.41 (Greensboro, NC 2011)
  - 300 meters indoor – 36.83 (Fayetteville, AR 2021)
- 400 m hurdles – 54.09 (Eugene, OR 2015)

=== International competitions ===
Representing the United States
Year	Competition	Venue	Position	Event	Time
2015	World Championships	Beijing, China	– (sf)	100 m hurdles	DQ
2016	World Indoor Championships	Portland, United States	8th	60 m hurdles	8.87
2017	World Championships	London, United Kingdom	4th	100 m hurdles	12.74
2018	World Indoor Championships	Birmingham, United Kingdom	1st	60 m hurdles	7.70
2018	NACAC Championships	Toronto, Canada	1st	100 m hurdles	12.55
2018	IAAF Continental Cup	Ostrava, Czech Republic	2nd	100 m hurdles	12.52
2019	World Championships	Doha, Qatar	2nd	100 m hurdles	12.46
2021	Olympic Games	Tokyo, Japan	2nd	100 m hurdles	12.52
2022	World Championships	Eugene, OR, United States	2nd (sf)	100 m hurdles	12.27^{1}
2023	World Championships	Budapest, Hungary	3rd	100 m hurdles	12.46
2026	World Ultimate Championship	Budapest, Hungary	14th (h)	100 m hurdles	12.88

^{1}Disqualified in the final

=== National titles ===
- NCAA Women's Division I Indoor Track and Field Championships
  - 60 m hurdles: 2015
- NCAA Women's Division I Outdoor Track and Field Championships
  - 100 m hurdles: 2015

Records
Preceded by (Bulgaria) Yordanka Donkova	Women's 100 m hurdles world record holder July 22, 2016 – July 24, 2022	Succeeded by (Nigeria) Tobi Amusan
