= 2016 IAAF World Indoor Championships – Women's 60 metres hurdles =

Women's 60 metres hurdles at the 2016 IAAF World Indoor Championships
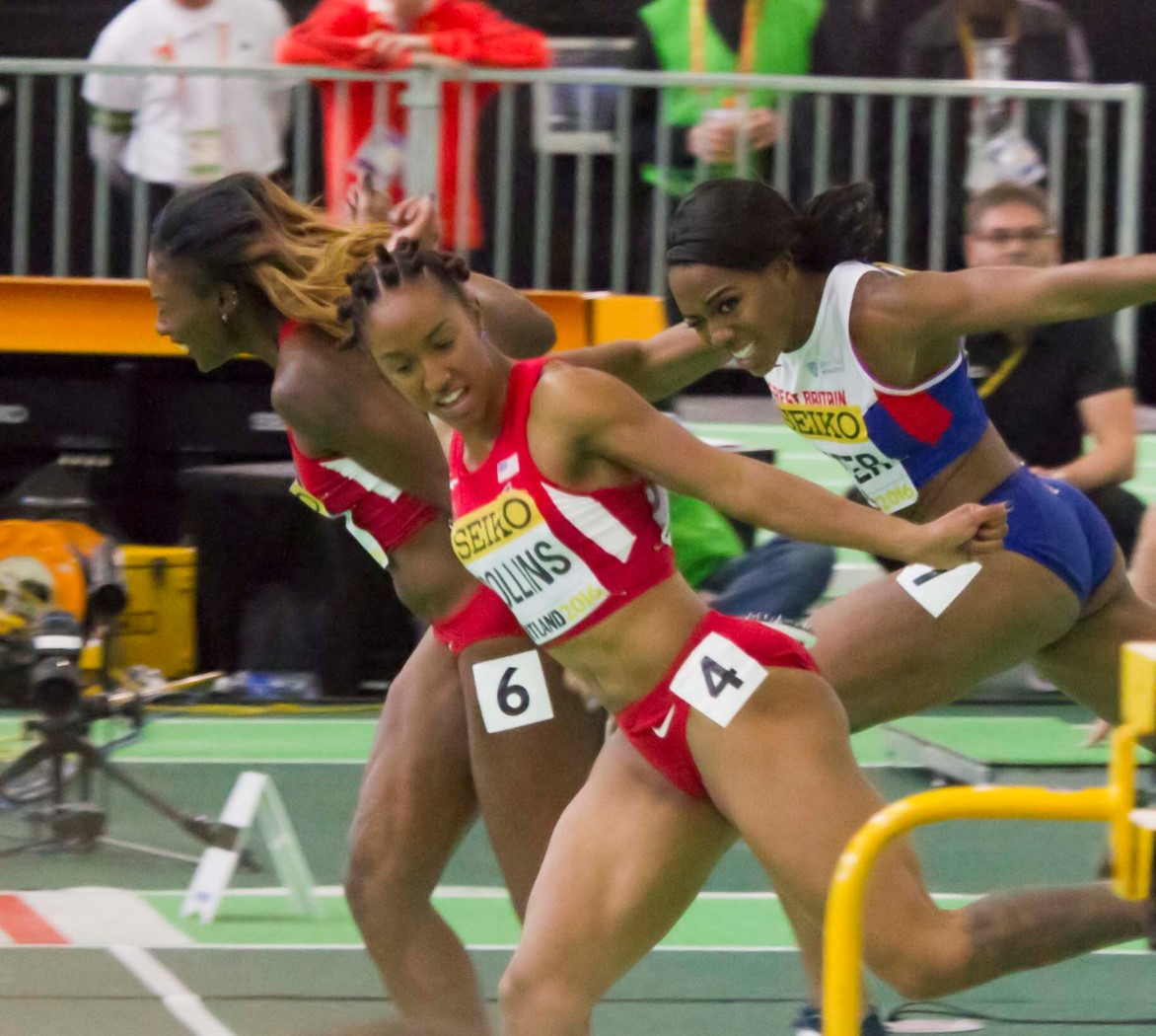
- Venue: Oregon Convention Center
- Dates: March 18
- Competitors: 19 from 14 nations
- Winning time: 7.81

Medalists
gold medal	Nia Ali	United States
silver medal	Brianna Rollins	United States
bronze medal	Tiffany Porter	Great Britain

Video on YouTube Official Video

The women's 60 metres hurdles at the 2016 IAAF World Indoor Championships took place on March 18, 2016.

In the final, Angela Whyte had the best start, while Kendra Harrison led the American pack in the center of the track. While Harrison was the first to the first hurdle, she hit it flat with her shoe, losing her balance and all momentum. She was unable to clear the second hurdle in stride and was out of contention. To her left Brianna Rollins was clean over the first hurdles while on her right Nia Ali hit the first and was half a meter behind. Rollins' speed between the hurdles easily passed Whyte, while Ali gained a little ground aggressively snapping over each hurdle. Coming off the last hurdle, Rollins lead was only inches, but Ali was able to make up just enough ground to out lean Rollins at the finish. To Ali's right, Tiffany Porter came off the first hurdle even with Ali, but her taller, more upright running form lost a little ground as Ali was chasing Rollins. Still Porter was clearly the next best of the field.

== Results ==
=== Heats ===
Qualification: First 2 (Q) and next 2 fastest (q) qualified for the final.

Rank	Heat	Name	Nationality	Time	Notes
1	3	Kendra Harrison	United States	7.81	Q
2	1	Brianna Rollins	United States	7.82	Q
3	3	Andrea Ivančević	Croatia	7.91	Q, NR
4	2	Nia Ali	United States	7.91	Q
5	1	Alina Talay	Belarus	7.96	Q, SB
6	2	Tiffany Porter	Great Britain	8.00	Q
7	1	Serita Solomon	Great Britain	8.04	q
8	3	Angela Whyte	Canada	8.09	q
9	2	Hanna Plotitsyna	Ukraine	8.09	
10	1	Michelle Jenneke	Australia	8.10	PB
11	1	Pedrya Seymour	Bahamas	8.15	PB
12	1	Wu Shuijiao	China	8.18	SB
13	2	Stephanie Bendrat	Austria	8.25	
14	3	Fabiana Moraes	Brazil	8.28	
15	3	Marina Tomić	Slovenia	8.33	
16	2	Gréta Kerekes	Hungary	8.37	
17	1	Samantha Scarlett	Jamaica	8.37	
18	3	Luca Kozák	Hungary	8.46	
	2	Danielle Williams	Jamaica	DNF	

=== Final ===
The final was started at 20:30.

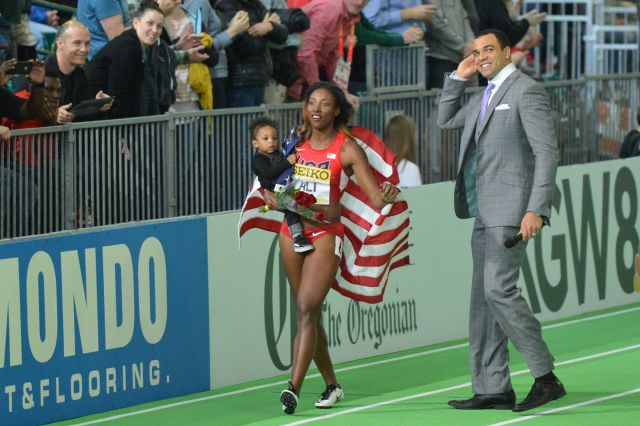
Nia Ali after winning

Rank	Lane	Name	Nationality	Time	Notes
1st place, gold medalist(s)	6	Nia Ali	United States	7.81	SB
2nd place, silver medalist(s)	4	Brianna Rollins	United States	7.82	
3rd place, bronze medalist(s)	7	Tiffany Porter	Great Britain	7.90	
4	3	Andrea Ivančević	Croatia	7.95	
5	2	Angela Whyte	Canada	7.99	SB
6	8	Alina Talay	Belarus	8.00	
7	1	Serita Solomon	Great Britain	8.29	
8	5	Kendra Harrison	United States	8.87	
