= Kierre Beckles =

Barbadian hurdler (born 1990)

Personal information
- Born: May 21, 1990 (age 36) Pinelands, Saint Michael, Barbados
- Education: University of South Carolina
- Height: 1.76 m (5 ft 9 in)
- Weight: 61 kg (134 lb)

Sport
- Country: Barbados
- Sport: Athletics
- Event: Hurdling
- Coached by: James Daniels
- Updated on 2 January 2015

Kierre Kamille Beckles (born 21 May 1990) is a Barbadian athlete specializing in the 100 metres hurdles. She competed at the 2011 and 2013 World Championships failing to advance to the semi-finals on both occasions.

== Personal bests ==
Her personal bests of 12.98 (100 m hurdles) from 2014 and 8.11 (60 m hurdles) from 2012 are the current Barbadian records.

Event	Result	Venue	Date
Outdoor
100 m hurdles	12.98 s (wind: +0.9 m/s)	(United States) Clermont, Florida	31 May 2014
Indoor
60 m hurdles	8.11 s	(United States) Lexington, Kentucky	26 Feb 2012

== Competition record ==
Year	Competition	Venue	Position	Event	Notes
Representing Barbados
2004	CARIFTA Games (U17)	Hamilton, Bermuda	7th	100 m H	15.49
2004	CARIFTA Games (U17)	Hamilton, Bermuda	3rd	300 m H	44.23
2004	CARIFTA Games (U17)	Hamilton, Bermuda	4th	4 × 100 m	48.32
2004	CAC Junior Championships (U17)	Coatzacoalcos, Mexico	6th	100 m H	14.98
2004	CAC Junior Championships (U17)	Coatzacoalcos, Mexico	2nd	300 m H	44.67
2005	CARIFTA Games (U17)	Bacolet, Trinidad and Tobago	9th (h)	100 m H	15.31
2005	CARIFTA Games (U17)	Bacolet, Trinidad and Tobago	7th	300 m H	46.86
2006	CARIFTA Games (U17)	Les Abymes, Guadeloupe	2nd	100 m H	13.90
2006	CARIFTA Games (U17)	Les Abymes, Guadeloupe	2nd	300 m H	41.76
2006	CARIFTA Games (U17)	Les Abymes, Guadeloupe	4th	4 × 100 m	47.05
2006	CARIFTA Games (U17)	Les Abymes, Guadeloupe	3rd	4 × 400 m	3:49.78
2006	CAC Junior Championships (U17)	Port of Spain, Trinidad	1st	100 m H	13.72
2006	CAC Junior Championships (U17)	Port of Spain, Trinidad	1st	300 m H	41.55
2006	CAC Junior Championships (U17)	Port of Spain, Trinidad	6th	4 × 100 m	51.79
2006	CAC Junior Championships (U17)	Port of Spain, Trinidad	3rd	4 × 400 m	3:47.38
2006	World Junior Championships	Beijing, China	16th (sf)	100 m H	14.04 (-1.6 m/s)
2007	CARIFTA Games (U20)	Providenciales, Turks and Caicos Islands	3rd	100 m H	14.03
2007	CARIFTA Games (U20)	Providenciales, Turks and Caicos Islands	5th	Pentathlon	3115 pts
2007	World Youth Championships	Ostrava, Czech Republic	10th (sf)	100 m H (76.2 cm)	13.79 (0.0 m/s)
2008	CARIFTA Games (U20)	Basseterre, Saint Kitts and Nevis	1st	100 m H	13.43
2008	CARIFTA Games (U20)	Basseterre, Saint Kitts and Nevis	3rd	4 × 100 m	45.75
2008	World Junior Championships	Bydgoszcz, Poland	8th	100 m H	13.96 (-2.4 m/s)
2008	Commonwealth Youth Games	Pune, India	1st	100 m H	13.88
2009	CARIFTA Games (U20)	Vieux Fort, Saint Lucia	1st	100 m H	13.31 (w)
2009	CARIFTA Games (U20)	Vieux Fort, Saint Lucia	—	4 × 100 m	DQ
2009	CARIFTA Games (U20)	Vieux Fort, Saint Lucia	2nd	4 × 400 m	3:41.75
2009	Central American and Caribbean Championships	Havana, Cuba	8th	100 m H	13.85
2011	Central American and Caribbean Championships	Mayagüez, Puerto Rico	4th	100 m H	13.24
2011	World Championships	Daegu, South Korea	31st (h)	100 m H	13.44
2012	NACAC U23 Championships	Irapuato, Mexico	2nd	100 m H	13.05 w (+4.5 m/s)
2013	Central American and Caribbean Championships	Morelia, Mexico	2nd	100 m H	13.37
2013	World Championships	Moscow, Russia	31st (h)	100 m H	13.47
2014	Commonwealth Games	Glasgow, United Kingdom	6th	100 m H	13.38
2014	Pan American Sports Festival	Mexico City, Mexico	7th (h)^{1}	100 m H	13.33 A (+0.6 m/s)
2014	Central American and Caribbean Games	Xalapa, Mexico	3rd	100 m H	13.47 A (-0.8 m/s)
2015	Pan American Games	Toronto, Canada	7th	100 m H	13.24
2015	NACAC Championships	San José, Costa Rica	3rd	100 m H	12.88 (w)
2015	World Championships	Beijing, China	12th (sf)	100 m H	12.90
2016	Olympic Games	Rio de Janeiro, Brazil	24th (h)	100 m H	13.01
2018	Commonwealth Games	Gold Coast, Australia	10th (h)	100 m H	13.64
2018	Central American and Caribbean Games	Barranquilla, Colombia	8th	100 m H	13.48
2018	NACAC Championships	Toronto, Canada	9th (h)	100 m H	13.45

^{1}: Did not finish in the final,
