= 2008 World Junior Championships in Athletics – Women's 100 metres hurdles =

The women's 100 metres hurdles event at the 2008 World Junior Championships in Athletics was held in Bydgoszcz, Poland, at Zawisza Stadium on 10, 11 and 12 July.

== Medalists ==
Gold	Teona Rodgers; United States
Silver	Shermaine Williams; Jamaica
Bronze	Belkis Milanés; Cuba

== Results ==
=== Final ===
12 July
Wind: -2.4 m/s

Rank	Name	Nationality	Time	Notes
1st place, gold medalist(s)	Teona Rodgers	United States	13.40	
2nd place, silver medalist(s)	Shermaine Williams	Jamaica	13.48	
3rd place, bronze medalist(s)	Belkis Milanés	Cuba	13.49	
4	Alina Talai	Belarus	13.50	
5	Anne Zagré	Belgium	13.55	
6	Natasha Ruddock	Jamaica	13.70	
7	Krystal Bodie	Bahamas	13.72	
8	Kierre Beckles	Barbados	13.96	

=== Semifinals ===
11 July

==== Semifinal 1 ====
Wind: -0.3 m/s

Rank	Name	Nationality	Time	Notes
1	Belkis Milanés	Cuba	13.46	Q
2	Krystal Bodie	Bahamas	13.57	Q
3	Lisa Urech	Switzerland	13.72	
4	Marika Partinen	Finland	13.84	
5	Asuka Terada	Japan	13.85	
6	Tine Teigene Dalen	Norway	13.98	
7	Anna Nastusenko	Russia	13.99	
8	Claudia Viljoen	South Africa	14.08	

==== Semifinal 2 ====
Wind: -0.3 m/s

Rank	Name	Nationality	Time	Notes
1	Alina Talai	Belarus	13.31	Q
2	Shermaine Williams	Jamaica	13.37	Q
3	Kierre Beckles	Barbados	13.44	q
4	Anne Zagré	Belgium	13.56	q
5	Aisseta Diawara	France	13.64	
6	Isabelle Pedersen	Norway	13.82	
7	Katerina Rajmová	Czech Republic	14.39	
	Karelie Edwards	Canada	DNF	

==== Semifinal 3 ====
Wind: -1.5 m/s

Rank	Name	Nationality	Time	Notes
1	Teona Rodgers	United States	13.43	Q
2	Natasha Ruddock	Jamaica	13.79	Q
3	Justyna Rybak	Poland	13.79	
4	Jessica Alcan	France	13.84	
5	Emma Tuvesson	Sweden	14.08	
6	Nicole Kroonenburg	Netherlands	14.10	
7	Cindy Roleder	Germany	14.10	
8	Matilda Bogdanoff	Finland	14.12	

=== Heats ===
10 July

==== Heat 1 ====
Wind: -1.3 m/s

Rank	Name	Nationality	Time	Notes
1	Teona Rodgers	United States	13.53	Q
2	Marika Partinen	Finland	13.97	Q
3	Nicole Kroonenburg	Netherlands	14.11	Q
4	Emma Tuvesson	Sweden	14.20	Q
5	Marzena Koscielniak	Poland	14.26	
6	Meng Yuan	China	14.30	
7	Merita Bytyqiova	Slovakia	14.51	
8	Agustina Bawele	Indonesia	15.11	

==== Heat 2 ====
Wind: -1.8 m/s

Rank	Name	Nationality	Time	Notes
1	Cindy Roleder	Germany	13.98	Q
2	Asuka Terada	Japan	14.09	Q
3	Tine Teigene Dalen	Norway	14.14	Q
4	Katerina Rajmová	Czech Republic	14.15	Q
5	Kärt Kuningas	Estonia	14.24	
6	Vashti Thomas	United States	14.39	
7	Sara Strajnar	Slovenia	14.47	
8	Sandra Lawler	Ireland	14.58	

==== Heat 3 ====
Wind: -1.6 m/s

Rank	Name	Nationality	Time	Notes
1	Belkis Milanés	Cuba	13.62	Q
2	Natasha Ruddock	Jamaica	13.73	Q
3	Aisseta Diawara	France	13.78	Q
4	Justyna Rybak	Poland	13.81	Q
5	Anna Nastusenko	Russia	13.89	q
6	Mairead Murphy	Ireland	14.21	
7	Junel Anderson	Austria	14.34	
8	Elminette Beckmann	South Africa	14.83	

==== Heat 4 ====
Wind: +1.2 m/s

Rank	Name	Nationality	Time	Notes
1	Alina Talai	Belarus	13.34	Q
2	Shermaine Williams	Jamaica	13.38	Q
3	Jessica Alcan	France	13.62	Q
4	Lisa Urech	Switzerland	13.70	Q
5	Claudia Viljoen	South Africa	13.87	q
6	Matilda Bogdanoff	Finland	13.93	q
7	Anastasiya Stoyanova	Ukraine	14.15	
8	Lecabela Quaresma	São Tomé and Príncipe	14.81	

==== Heat 5 ====
Wind: -2.0 m/s

Rank	Name	Nationality	Time	Notes
1	Krystal Bodie	Bahamas	13.66	Q
2	Anne Zagré	Belgium	13.72	Q
3	Isabelle Pedersen	Norway	13.92	Q
4	Kierre Beckles	Barbados	13.95	Q
5	Karelie Edwards	Canada	14.01	q
6	Giulia Pennella	Italy	14.14	
7	Gorana Cvijetic	Bosnia and Herzegovina	14.26	
8	Ljubica Milos	Chile	14.29	
9	Chang Hsin-Fang	Chinese Taipei	14.37	

== Participation ==
According to an unofficial count, 41 athletes from 33 countries participated in the event.

- Austria (1)
- Bahamas (1)
- Barbados (1)
- Belarus (1)
- Belgium (1)
- Bosnia and Herzegovina (1)
- Canada (1)
- Chile (1)
- China (1)
- Chinese Taipei (1)
- Cuba (1)
- Czech Republic (1)
- Estonia (1)
- Finland (2)
- France (2)
- Germany (1)
- Indonesia (1)
- Ireland (2)
- Italy (1)
- Jamaica (2)
- Japan (1)
- Netherlands (1)
- Norway (2)
- Poland (2)
- Russia (1)
- São Tomé and Príncipe (1)
- Slovakia (1)
- Slovenia (1)
- South Africa (2)
- Sweden (1)
- Switzerland (1)
- Ukraine (1)
- United States (2)
