= Claudia Heunis =

South African hurdler (born 1989)

Medal record

Women's athletics

Representing South Africa

African Championships
Gold medal – first place	2016 Durban	100 m hurdles

Claudia Heunis (née Viljoen; born 1 May 1989) is a South African track and field athlete who competes in the 100 metres hurdles. She was the gold medallist in the event at the African Championships in Athletics in 2016. She holds a personal best of 13.36 seconds, set while winning that medal. Currently her personal best is 13.23 seconds.

Heunis competed as a junior athlete and won a bronze medal at the 2007 African Junior Athletics Championships. She was a semi-finalist at the 2008 World Junior Championships in Athletics and also ran as part of the 4 × 100 metres relay team. She took a break from the sport for four years and reappeared in the senior ranks for the 2012 African Championships in Athletics, where she came seventh in the final.

Heunis was much improved in the 2015 season, recording a best of 13.36 seconds in winning the 2015 South African Athletics Championships. A fifth-place finish followed at the 2015 African Games. She rose to the top of the continental scene with a win at the 2016 African Championships in Athletics.

== International competitions ==
Year	Competition	Venue	Position	Event	Notes
2007	African Junior Championships	Ouagadougou, Burkina Faso	3rd	100 m hurdles	14.48
2008	World Junior Championships	Bydgoszcz, Poland	8th (semis)	100 m hurdles	14.08
2008	World Junior Championships	Bydgoszcz, Poland	7th (heats)	4 × 100 m relay	46.37
2012	African Championships	Porto-Novo, Benin	7th	100 m hurdles	13.97
2012	African Championships	Porto-Novo, Benin	4th	4 × 100 m relay	45.56
2015	African Games	Brazzaville, Republic of Congo	5th	100 m hurdles	13.45
2016	African Championships	Durban, South Africa	1st	100 m hurdles	13.35

== National titles ==
- South African Athletics Championships
  - 100 m hurdles: 2015

100mh. 2016 South African Champion 100mh. 2012 South African Champion 100mh. 2011 South African Champion
