= 2016 African Championships in Athletics – Women's 100 metres hurdles =

The women's 100 metres hurdles event at the 2016 African Championships in Athletics was held on 22 and 23 June in Kings Park Stadium.

== Medalists ==
Gold	Silver	Bronze
Claudia Heunis; South Africa	Marthe Koala; Burkina Faso	Maryke Brits; South Africa

== Results ==
=== Heats ===
Qualification: First 3 of each heat (Q) and the next 2 fastest (q) qualified for the final.

Wind:
Heat 1: +0.5 m/s, Heat 2: +1.2 m/s

Rank	Heat	Name	Nationality	Time	Notes
1	2	Marthe Koala	Burkina Faso	13.43	Q
2	2	Maryke Brits	South Africa	13.52	Q
3	1	Claudia Heunis	South Africa	13.58	Q
4	2	Rahamatou Drame	Mali	13.60	Q
5	1	Gnima Faye	Senegal	13.66	Q
6	1	Taylon Bieldt	South Africa	13.71	Q
7	1	Lina Ahmed	Egypt	13.84	q
8	2	Karel Ziketh	Ivory Coast	13.86	q
9	2	Toyin Augustus	Nigeria	14.19	
10	1	Priscilla Tabunda	Kenya	14.79	
11	2	Veronica Chebet	Kenya	15.52	
12	2	Alice Maunze	Zimbabwe	16.25	
	1	Miheret Tamirat	Ethiopia	DNF	
	1	Nene Kanate	Ivory Coast	DNF	
	1	Reïna-Flor Okori	Equatorial Guinea	DNS	
	2	Elizabeth Dadzie	Ghana	DNS	

=== Final ===
Wind: +1.6 m/s

Rank	Lane	Athlete	Nationality	Time	Notes
1st place, gold medalist(s)	3	Claudia Heunis	South Africa	13.35	
2nd place, silver medalist(s)	4	Marthe Koala	Burkina Faso	13.36	
3rd place, bronze medalist(s)	6	Maryke Brits	South Africa	13.47	
4	8	Taylon Bieldt	South Africa	13.47	
5	5	Gnima Faye	Senegal	13.63	
6	1	Karel Ziketh	Ivory Coast	13.68	
7	2	Lina Ahmed	Egypt	13.81	
8	7	Rahamatou Drame	Mali	14.01	
