= Nia Ali =

American track and field athlete

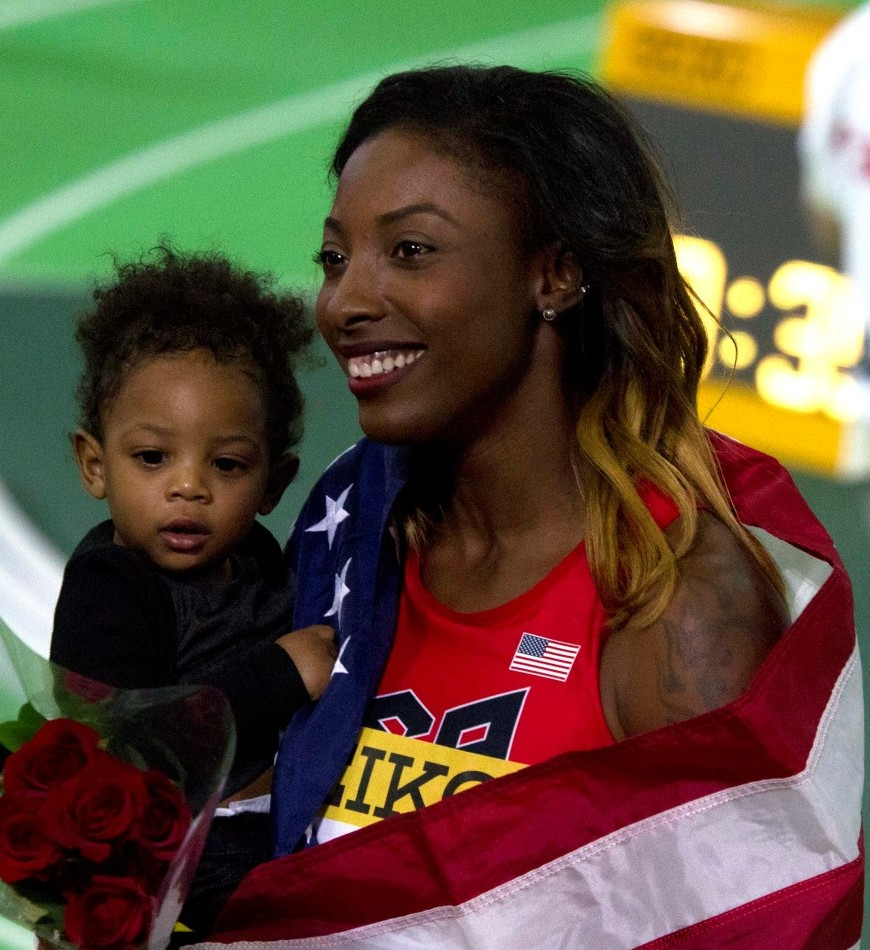
- Ali at the 2016 Summer Olympics

Personal information
- Full name: Nia Ali
- Nationality: American
- Born: October 23, 1988 (age 37) Philadelphia, Pennsylvania, U.S.
- Height: 5 ft 7 in (170 cm)
- Weight: 143 lb (65 kg)

Sport
- Country: United States
- Sport: Track and field
- Event: 100 metres hurdles
- College team: USC Trojans
- Team: Nike
- Turned pro: 2011
- Coached by: John Coghlan

Achievements and titles
- Olympic finals: 2016
- Personal best: 100 metres hurdles: 12.30
Medal record
Women's track and field
Representing United States
Olympic Games
Silver medal – second place	2016 Rio de Janeiro	100 m hurdles
World Championships
Gold medal – first place	2019 Doha	100 m hurdles
World Indoor Championships
Gold medal – first place	2014 Sopot	60 m hurdles
Gold medal – first place	2016 Portland	60 m hurdles
World University Games
Gold medal – first place	2011 Shenzhen	100 m hurdles

Nia Ali (born October 23, 1988) is an American track and field athlete who specializes in the 100 m hurdles, heptathlon, and other events.

She is the 2016 Olympic Silver Medalist in the 100-meter hurdles, the 2019 World champion in the 100-meter hurdles, and twice in a row world indoor champion (2014 Sopot and 2016 Portland) in 60 meters hurdles.

== Early life ==
Raised in the Germantown section of Philadelphia and attending West Catholic Preparatory High School, Ali moved to Pleasantville, New Jersey, for her senior year and graduated from Pleasantville High School in 2006.

== Career ==
=== NCAA ===
In college, Ali was the 2011 NCAA leader and NCAA champion for the USC Trojans in the 100 m hurdles in a time of (2.1w) 12.63. Ali formerly competed for the Tennessee Volunteers (then the Lady Volunteers) where she was Southeastern Conference champion in the heptathlon and at USC she was an All-American in the heptathlon.

=== Professional ===
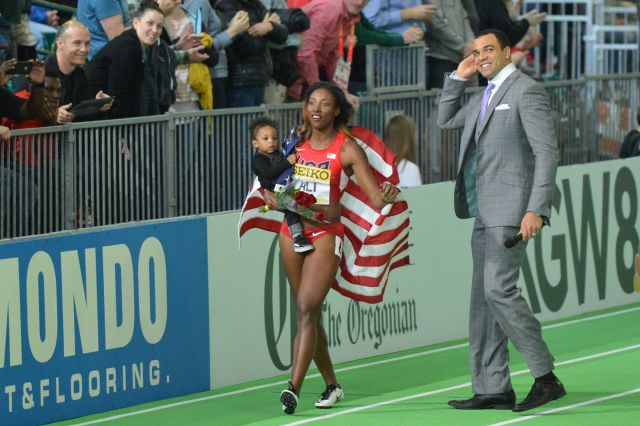
Nia Ali with her son after winning the 2016 World Indoor Championships

Ali was selected to represent the U.S. in Shenzhen, China for the World University Games where she won the gold medal in a time of 12.85.

At the 2013 USA Outdoor Track and Field Championships Ali took third in the 100 m hurdles to qualify for the 2013 World Championships in Athletics. At the World Championships, Ali was a semi-finalist in the 100 m hurdles, ultimately finishing 10th.

At the 2014 USA Outdoor Track and Field Championships Ali took eighth in the 100 m hurdles.

She won the 60 meters hurdles at the 2013 USA Indoor Track and Field Championships in Albuquerque, New Mexico in a personal best of 7.93 and repeated the year later with a new personal best of 7.80, which also qualified her for the 2014 World Indoor Championships where she took the gold medal running 7.80 a second time.

In 2015, Ali took a year off to give birth to her son with hurdler Michael Tinsley. She returned to the 2016 World Indoor Championships to successfully defend her gold medal. After winning, she carried her son on the victory lap.

Ali placed third in the 100 hurdles in a time of 12.55 at the 2016 United States Olympic Trials behind Team USA teammates Brianna Rollins, Kristi Castlin to qualify to represent the United States at the 2016 Summer Olympics in Brazil. Later that year she won the silver medal at the Olympics. The United States was the first country to win gold, silver, and bronze in the women's 100 hurdles in one Olympics in 2016; this was also the first time American women achieved such a sweep in any Olympic track and field event.

In 2019, Ali won the gold medal in the 100 m hurdles at the IAAF world championships in Doha, Qatar with a personal-best time of 12.34. The time ties her with Sharika Nelvis as the #9 performer of all time.

== Competition record ==
=== National championships results ===
Representing the Pleasantville High School Greyhounds (2006), University of Tennessee Volunteers (2007), University of Southern California Trojans (2007–2011), and Nike (2011–2024)
Year	Championship	Position	Event	Time or mark	Wind (m/s)	Venue
2006	USA Junior Outdoor Track and Field Championships	4th	100 m hurdles	13.55	+2.5	Indianapolis, Indiana
2009	USA Outdoor Track and Field Championships	DNF	Heptathlon	N/A	—N/a	Eugene, Oregon
2011	USA Outdoor Track and Field Championships	5th	100 m hurdles	12.86	+1.8	Eugene, Oregon
2012	USA Olympic Trials	8th	100 m hurdles	13.02	-1.6	Eugene, Oregon
2013	USA Indoor Track and Field Championships	1st	60 m hurdles	7.93	—N/a	Albuquerque, New Mexico
2013	USA Outdoor Track and Field Championships	3rd	100 m hurdles	12.48	+1.2	Des Moines, Iowa
2014	USA Indoor Track and Field Championships	1st	60 m hurdles	7.80	—N/a	Albuquerque, New Mexico
2014	USA Outdoor Track and Field Championships	8th	100 m hurdles	13.16	-1.6	Sacramento, California
2016	USA Indoor Track and Field Championships	SF1 1st	60 m hurdles	7.85	—N/a	Portland, Oregon
2016	USA Indoor Track and Field Championships	10th	High jump	1.75	—N/a	Portland, Oregon
2016	USA Olympic Trials	3rd	100 m hurdles	12.55	+1.2	Eugene, Oregon
2017	USA Outdoor Track and Field Championships	2nd	100 m hurdles	12.68	−1.7	Sacramento, California
2019	U.S. Championships	2nd	100 m hurdles	12.55	−1.2	Des Moines, Iowa
2022	USA Outdoor Track and Field Championships	DNS	100 m hurdles	N/A	—N/a	Eugene, Oregon
2023	USA Outdoor Championships	1st	100 m hurdles	12.37	+0.4	Eugene, Oregon
2024	USA Olympic Trials	4th	100 m hurdles	12.37	+0.7	Eugene, Oregon

=== International championship results ===
Year	Competition	Venue	Position	Event	Time	Wind (m/s)	Notes
2013	World Championships	Moscow, Russia	3rd (sf)	100 m hurdles	12.83	-0.6	
2014	World Indoor Championships	Sopot, Poland	1st	60 m hurdles	7.80		PB
2016	World Indoor Championships	Portland, USA	1st	60 m hurdles	7.81		PB
2016	Olympic Games	Rio de Janeiro, Brazil	2nd	100 m hurdles	12.59	+0.0	
2017	World Championships	London, England	8th	100 m hurdles	13.04	+0.1	
2019	World Championships	Doha, Qatar	1st	100 m hurdles	12.34	+0.3	PB
2022	World Championships	Eugene, USA	100 m hurdles	DQ (h)	-	-0.3	
2023	World Championships	Budapest, Hungary	8th	100 m hurdles	12.78	-0.2	

== Personal life ==
Ali has a son, Titus Maximus, with American Olympian Michael Tinsley, an American track and field athlete specializing in the 400-metre hurdles. In June 2018, she had a daughter with her partner, Canadian Olympic sprinter Andre De Grasse, and a second child in May 2021.
