= Lisa Urech =

Swiss hurdler

Lisa Urech (born 27 July 1989) is a retired Swiss track and field athlete who specialised in the 100 metres hurdles. She holds the national record in the 100 metres hurdles since 2011. After several injury-plagued years, Urech retired from competitive athletics in 2016.

== Competition record ==
Year	Competition	Venue	Position	Event	Notes
Representing Switzerland
2007	European Junior Championships	Hengelo, Netherlands	14th (h)	100 m hurdles	14.14
2008	World Junior Championships	Bydgoszcz, Poland	9th (sf)	100 m hurdles	13.72 (wind: -0.3 m/s)
2009	European Indoor Championships	Turin, Italy	19th (h)	60 metres hurdles	8.31
2009	European U23 Championships	Kaunas, Lithuania	6th	100 m hurdles	13.41 (wind: -2.0 m/s)
2009	World Championships	Berlin, Germany	28th (h)	100 m hurdles	13.36
2010	World Indoor Championships	Doha, Qatar	12th (sf)	60 metres hurdles	8.09
2010	European Championships	Barcelona, Spain	7th	100 metres hurdles	13.02
2011	European Indoor Championships	Paris, France	11th (sf)	60 metres hurdles	8.06
2011	European U23 Championships	Ostrava, Czech Republic	2nd	100 m hurdles	13.00 (wind: -1.0 m/s)
2011	World Championships	Daegu, South Korea	9th (h)	100 m hurdles	12.86
2014	European Championships	Zürich, Switzerland	12th (sf)	100 m hurdles	13.10

== Personal bests ==
Outdoor

- 100m hurdles – 12.62 (2011 La Chaux-de-Fonds)

Indoor

- 60m hurdles – 8.00 (2011 Karlsruhe)
