= Cindy Roleder =

German hurdler

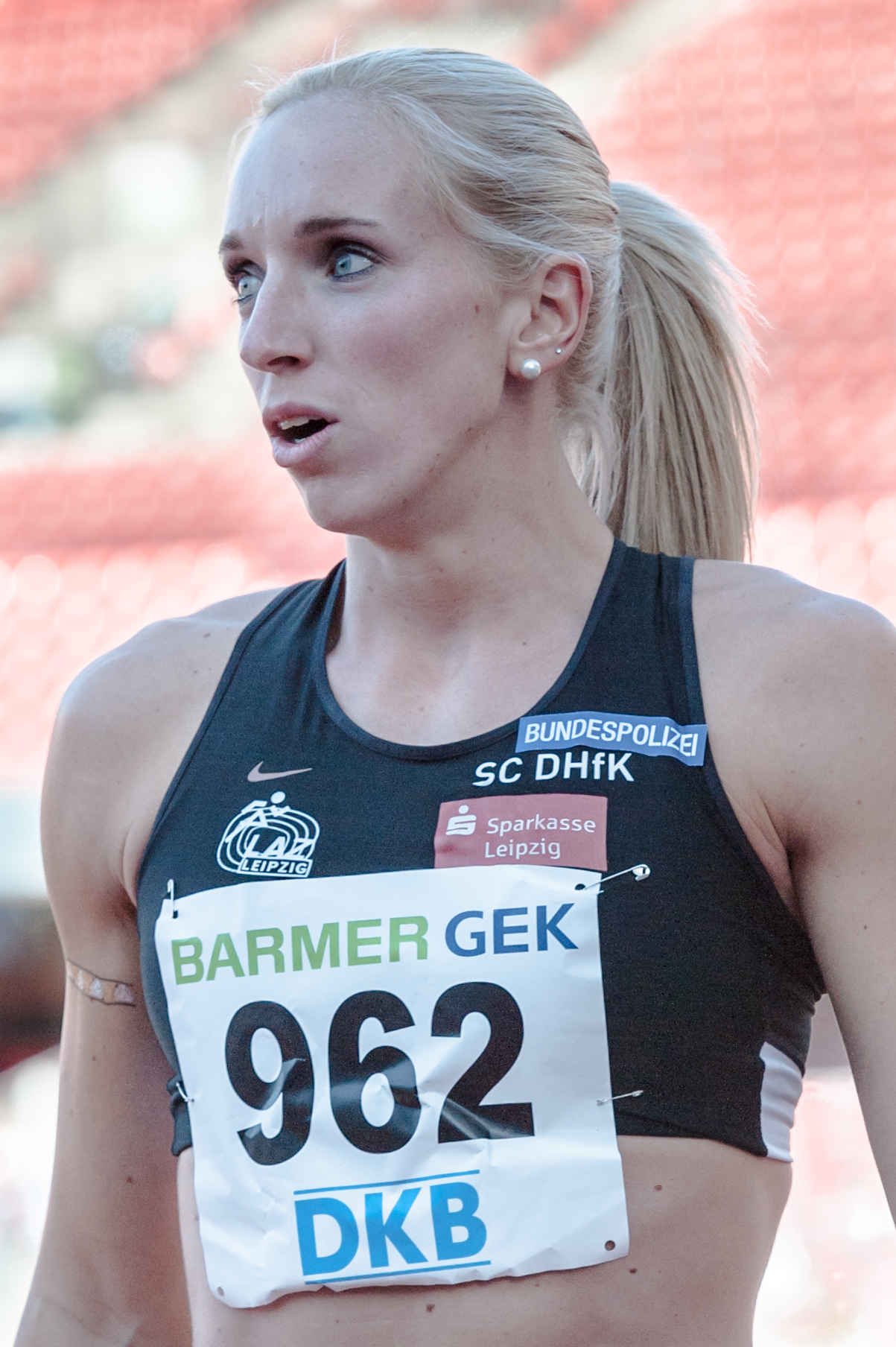
- Roleder in 2015

Personal information
- Born: 21 August 1989 (age 36) Karl-Marx-Stadt, East Germany
- Height: 1.78 m (5 ft 10 in)

Sport
- Country: Germany
- Sport: Athletics
- Events: 100 metres hurdles, 60 m hurdles
- Club: SC DHfK Leipzig
- Retired: 2023

Achievements and titles
- Personal bests: 100 m hurdles: 12.59 (Beijing 2015); 60 m hurdles: 7.84 (Leipzig 2017)
Medal record
Women's athletics
Representing Germany
World Championships
Silver medal – second place	2015 Beijing	100 m hurdles
European Championships
Gold medal – first place	2016 Amsterdam	100 m hurdles
Bronze medal – third place	2014 Zürich	100 m hurdles
Bronze medal – third place	2018 Berlin	100 m hurdles
European Indoor Championships
Gold medal – first place	2017 Belgrade	60 m hurdles
Silver medal – second place	2019 Glasgow	60 m hurdles
European U23 Championships
Bronze medal – third place	2011 Ostrava	100 m hurdles

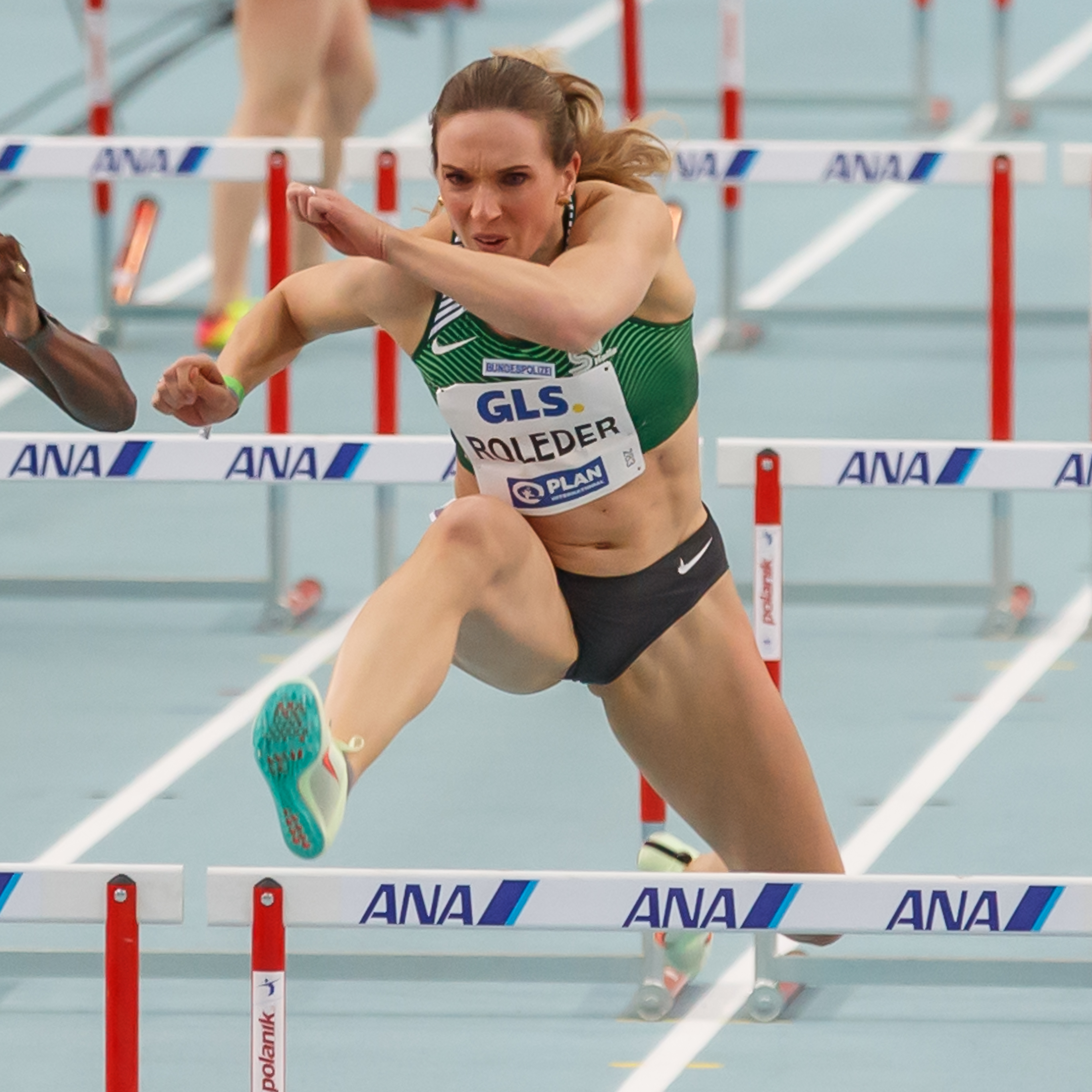
Roleder at the German Indoor Championships in 2022

Cindy Roleder (born 21 August 1989) is a German track and field athlete, specializing in 100 metres hurdles. She won the silver medal at the 2015 World Championships in Athletics. Roleder claimed three medals at the European Athletics Championships, becoming the first German winner of the European 100 m hurdles title since reunification in 2016. She also won the 60 m hurdles title at the 2017 European Indoor Championships.

Roleder won nine German national titles outdoors and indoors.

== Early life and early career ==
Cindy Roleder was born in Karl-Marx-Stadt, now Chemnitz. Originally a gymnast, she took up athletics at the age of 8 when her sports teacher Mr Grosser spotted her running speed and asked her to join his running club, where Roleder competed against children 1–2 years older than herself. She made her international debut at the 2007 European Junior Championships in Hengelo, Netherlands, where she finished fourth in the 100 metres hurdles. In 2011, Roleder won her first international medal in the event at the European Under-23 Championships held in Ostrava.

== Career ==
Roleder competed at the 2012 Summer Olympics in London reaching the semifinals in her specialist event. She went one step better at the 2016 Olympic Games held in Rio de Janeiro and reached the final, finishing fifth. The biggest success of her career is the silver medal at the 2015 World Championships in Athletics in the 100 m hurdles with a personal best time of 12.59 seconds. She also won the 100 m hurdles at the 2016 European Championships and 60 m hurdles at the 2017 European Indoor Championships.

== Achievements ==
=== International competitions ===
Representing Germany
Year	Competition	Venue	Position	Event	Notes
2007	European Junior Championships	Hengelo, Netherlands	4th	100 m hurdles	13.65
2008	World Junior Championships	Bydgoszcz, Poland	21st (sf)	100 m hurdles	14.10
2009	European U23 Championships	Kaunas, Lithuania	12th (sf)	100 m hurdles	13.50 (+0.1 m/s)
2010	European Championships	Barcelona, Spain	12th (h)	100 m hurdles	13.19
2011	European Indoor Championships	Paris, France	11th (sf)	60 m hurdles	8.06
2011	European U23 Championships	Ostrava, Czech Republic	3rd	100 m hurdles	13.10 (-1.0 m/s)
2011	World Championships	Daegu, South Korea	12th (sf)	100 m hurdles	12.91
2012	World Indoor Championships	Istanbul, Turkey	17th (h)	60 m hurdles	8.35
2012	European Championships	Helsinki, Finland	7th	100 m hurdles	13.11
2012	Olympic Games	London, United Kingdom	18th (sf)	100 m hurdles	13.02
2014	World Indoor Championships	Sopot, Poland	6th	60 m hurdles	8.01
2014	European Championships	Zürich, Switzerland	3rd	100 m hurdles	12.82
2015	European Indoor Championships	Prague, Czech Republic	4th	60 m hurdles	7.93
2015	World Championships	Beijing, China	2nd	100 m hurdles	12.59
2016	European Championships	Amsterdam, Netherlands	1st	100 m hurdles	12.62
2016	Olympic Games	Rio de Janeiro, Brazil	5th	100 m hurdles	12.74
2017	European Indoor Championships	Belgrade, Serbia	1st	60 m hurdles	7.88
2018	World Indoor Championships	Birmingham, United Kingdom	5th	60 m hurdles	7.87
2018	European Championships	Berlin, Germany	3rd	100 m hurdles	12.77
2019	European Indoor Championships	Glasgow, United Kingdom	2nd	60 m hurdles	7.97
2019	World Championships	Doha, Qatar	11th (sf)	100 m hurdles	12.86

=== National titles ===
- German Athletics Championships
  - 100 m hurdles: 2011, 2015, 2016, 2019
- German Indoor Athletics Championships
  - 60 m hurdles: 2012, 2015, 2016, 2018, 2022
