= 2015 World Championships in Athletics – Women's 100 metres hurdles =

Women's 100 metres hurdles at the 2015 World Championships
- Venue: Beijing National Stadium
- Dates: 27 August (heats); 28 August (semifinals and final)
- Competitors: 37 from 27 nations
- Winning time: 12.57

Medalists
gold medal	Danielle Williams	Jamaica
silver medal	Cindy Roleder	Germany
bronze medal	Alina Talay	Belarus

The women's 100 metres hurdles at the 2015 World Championships in Athletics was held at the Beijing National Stadium on 27 and 28 August.

== Summary ==
Brianna Rollins of the United States entered the competition as the defending champion. Coming into this meet, on paper, this was an American event as eight of the top ten athletes in the world were Americans, but even with the returning champion, only four could compete here. The returning silver medalist, reigning Olympic Champion and two-time winner Sally Pearson could not return due to a tragic accident in Rome, so the best the world could offer was returning bronze medalist Tiffany Porter. But the hurdles require execution.

Two of the Americans disappeared in the semi-finals, Kendra Harrison by false start, 2008 Olympic Champion Dawn Harper-Nelson falling flat at the second hurdle. Making the finals were Rollins, after a tight battle with Andrea Ivančević and world #1 Sharika Nelvis, along with Porter and Jamaica's version of the Williams sisters, Danielle and Shermaine. Danielle along with Alina Talay and Cindy Roleder had to run personal bests just to make it into the finals.

In the final, Rollins was clearly the first to the first hurdle, however when she got to the first hurdle she didn't lift her lead leg high enough to clear it instead firmly hitting it with her foot and riding it down. That slight delay gave Danielle the narrow lead, chased by Porter and Nelvis. Porter started to move ahead and Rollins started to come back. At the ninth hurdle, Porter began to lose her balance putting Williams back in the lead. Bracketing the field, Talay in lane 2 and Roleder in lane 8 were running error free races away from the fireworks in the middle of the track. By the sixth hurdle, Talay was almost even with Rollins, while Roleder, last over the first hurdle, was steadily gaining. Coming over the final barrier, Roleder clearly took it the smoothest and had the strongest run to the finish. A perfectly timed lean almost caught Williams. In contrast, the off balance Porter lunged at Rollins way too early and tumbled to the track with a full somersault, while Talay efficiently out leaned Rollins for bronze. It was again a significant personal best for all three medalists with Talay's being a new National Record.

== Records ==
Prior to the competition, the records were as follows:

World record	Yordanka Donkova (BUL)	12.21	Stara Zagora, Bulgaria	20 August 1988
Championship record	Sally Pearson (AUS)	12.28	Daegu, South Korea	3 September 2011
World leading	Sharika Nelvis (USA)	12.34	Eugene, United States	26 June 2015
African record	Glory Alozie (NGR)	12.44	Fontvieille, Monaco	8 August 1998
African record	Glory Alozie (NGR)	12.44	Brussels, Belgium	28 August 1998
African record	Glory Alozie (NGR)	12.44	Seville, Spain	28 August 1999
Asian record	Olga Shishigina (KAZ)	12.44	Luzern, Switzerland	27 June 1995
NACAC record	Brianna Rollins (USA)	12.26	Des Moines, United States	22 June 2013
South American record	Maurren Higa Maggi (BRA)	12.71	Manaus, Brazil	19 May 2001
European Record	Yordanka Donkova (BUL)	12.21	Stara Zagora, Bulgaria	20 August 1988
Oceanian record	Sally Pearson (AUS)	12.28	Daegu, South Korea	3 September 2011

== Qualification standards ==
Entry standards
13.00

== Schedule ==
Date	Time	Round
27 August 2015	11:15	Heats
28 August 2015	19:25	Semifinals
28 August 2015	21:35	Final

All times are local times (UTC+8)

== Results ==
KEY:	Q	Qualified	q	Fastest non-qualifiers	NR	National record	PB	Personal best	SB	Seasonal best

=== Heats ===
Qualification: First 4 in each heat (Q) and the next 4 fastest (q) advanced to the semifinals.

Wind: Heat 1: -1.8 m/s, Heat 2: -1.2 m/s, Heat 3: -1.0 m/s, Heat 4: -0.4 m/s, Heat 5: -1.1 m/s.

Rank	Heat	Name	Nationality	Time	Notes
1	4	Brianna Rollins	United States	12.67	Q
2	5	Tiffany Porter	Great Britain & N.I.	12.73	Q
3	1	Danielle Williams	Jamaica	12.77	Q
4	4	Shermaine Williams	Jamaica	12.78	Q, PB
5	3	Dawn Harper-Nelson	United States	12.79	Q
6	2	Cindy Roleder	Germany	12.86	Q, SB
6	5	Nikkita Holder	Canada	12.86	Q
8	5	Alina Talay	Belarus	12.87	Q
9	3	Kierre Beckles	Barbados	12.88	Q, NR
9	4	Andrea Ivančević	Croatia	12.88	Q
11	1	Kendra Harrison	United States	12.90	Q
11	3	Anne Zagré	Belgium	12.90	Q
13	2	Sharika Nelvis	United States	12.93	Q
13	2	Noemi Zbären	Switzerland	12.93	Q
15	1	Isabelle Pedersen	Norway	12.96	Q
16	4	Cindy Ofili	Great Britain & N.I.	12.97	Q
17	3	Michelle Jenneke	Australia	13.02	Q
18	4	Phylicia George	Canada	13.03	q
19	3	Beate Schrott	Austria	13.04	q
20	2	Karolina Kołeczek	Poland	13.05	Q
21	2	Nina Morozova	Russia	13.06	q
22	5	Wu Shuijiao	China	13.09	Q
23	3	Kimberly Laing	Jamaica	13.10	q
24	2	Nooralotta Neziri	Finland	13.13	
25	1	Yekaterina Galitskaya	Russia	13.14	Q
26	1	Hanna Platitsyna	Ukraine	13.15	
27	3	Devynne Charlton	Bahamas	13.16	
28	1	Cindy Billaud	France	13.23	
29	5	Caridad Jerez	Spain	13.27	
30	4	Adelly Santos	Brazil	13.29	
31	5	Lindsay Lindley	Nigeria	13.30	
32	5	Fabiana Moraes	Brazil	13.35	
33	1	LaVonne Idlette	Dominican Republic	13.70	
34	2	Adanaca Brown	Bahamas	13.74	
35	5	Anna Camila Pirelli	Paraguay	14.09	
36	4	Yvette Lewis	Panama	14.12	
37	4	Beatriz Flamenco	El Salvador	14.77	

=== Semifinals ===
Qualification: First 2 in each heat (Q) and the next 2 fastest (q) advanced to the final.

Wind: Heat 1: -0.3 m/s, Heat 2: -0.4 m/s, Heat 3: -0.8 m/s

Rank	Heat	Name	Nationality	Time	Notes
1	1	Danielle Williams	Jamaica	12.58	Q, PB
2	1	Sharika Nelvis	United States	12.59	Q
3	2	Tiffany Porter	Great Britain & N.I.	12.62	Q
4	1	Alina Talay	Belarus	12.70	q, PB
5	3	Brianna Rollins	United States	12.71	Q
6	2	Cindy Roleder	Germany	12.79	Q, PB
7	2	Noemi Zbären	Switzerland	12.81	q
8	1	Isabelle Pedersen	Norway	12.86	PB
8	3	Shermaine Williams	Jamaica	12.86	Q
10	1	Phylicia George	Canada	12.87	SB
11	3	Anne Zagré	Belgium	12.88	
12	2	Kierre Beckles	Barbados	12.90	
13	1	Cindy Ofili	Great Britain & N.I.	12.91	
13	3	Nina Morozova	Russia	12.91	
15	3	Karolina Kołeczek	Poland	12.97	
16	2	Kimberly Laing	Jamaica	13.00	
16	3	Nikkita Holder	Canada	13.00	
18	2	Michelle Jenneke	Australia	13.01	
19	3	Wu Shuijiao	China	13.06	
20	3	Andrea Ivančević	Croatia	33.95	
	1	Beate Schrott	Austria	DNF	
	1	Dawn Harper-Nelson	United States	DNF	
	2	Yekaterina Galitskaya	Russia	DNF	
	2	Kendra Harrison	United States	DQ	R162.7

=== Final ===
The final was held at 21:35.

Wind: -0.3 m/s

Rank	Lane	Name	Nationality	Time	Notes
1st place, gold medalist(s)	5	Danielle Williams	Jamaica	12.57	PB
2nd place, silver medalist(s)	8	Cindy Roleder	Germany	12.59	PB
3rd place, bronze medalist(s)	2	Alina Talay	Belarus	12.66	NR
4	4	Brianna Rollins	United States	12.67	
5	7	Tiffany Porter	Great Britain & N.I.	12.68	
6	3	Noemi Zbären	Switzerland	12.95	
7	9	Shermaine Williams	Jamaica	12.95	
8	6	Sharika Nelvis	United States	13.06	
