= Karel Elodie Ziketh =

Ivorian hurdler (born 1991)

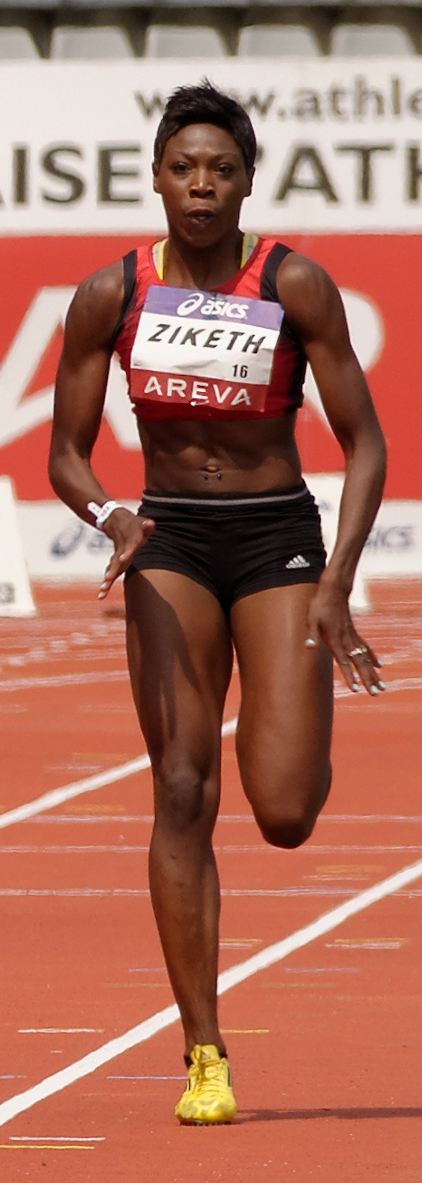
- Karel Elodie Ziketh (2013).

Medal record

Women's athletics

Representing Ivory Coast

African Championships
Silver medal – second place	2018 Asaba	4×100 m

Karel Elodie Ziketh (born 23 September 1991) is an Ivorian hurdler.

Despite representing the Ivory Coast, she hails from Cachan, France. She moved to the United States to study business management at Benedict College. She finished sixth at the 2016 African Championships, did not finish the race at the 2017 Jeux de la Francophonie and competed at the 2017 Summer Universiade and the 2018 World Indoor Championships without reaching the final.

At the 2017 Jeux de la Francophonie she also won a gold medal in the 4 × 100 meters relay.

Her personal best times are 13.68 seconds, achieved at the 2016 African Championships in Durban; and 11,86 in the 100 meters, achieved in June 2013 in Créteil.
