= Danielle Williams =

Jamaican hurdler (born 1992)

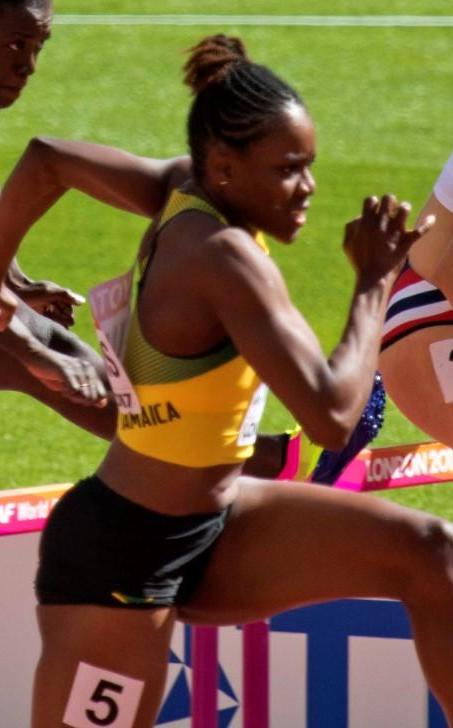

Personal information
- Full name: Danielle Gracia Williams
- Born: 14 September 1992 (age 34) St. Andrew, Jamaica
- Education: Johnson C. Smith University
- Height: 1.67 m (5 ft 6 in)
- Weight: 59 kg (130 lb)

Sport
- Country: Jamaica
- Sport: Track and field
- Event: 100 metres hurdles
- Coached by: Lennox Graham

Achievements and titles
- Personal bests: 100 m: 11.24 (Pueblo 2013); 100 m H: 12.31 (Silesia 2025 ); 200 m: 22.62: (Pueblo 2013); Indoors; 60 m H: 7.75 (Clemson 2022); 200 m: 23.12 (Clemson 2020)
Medal record
Women's athletics
Representing Jamaica
World Championships
Gold medal – first place	2015 Beijing	100 m hurdles
Gold medal – first place	2023 Budapest	100 m hurdles
Bronze medal – third place	2019 Doha	100 m hurdles
Commonwealth Games
Silver medal – second place	2018 Gold Coast	100 m hurdles
Diamond League
First place	2019 Brussels	100 mh
Summer Universiade
Gold medal – first place	2015 Gwangju	100 m hurdles
Bronze medal – third place	2013 Kazan	100 m hurdles
NACAC Championships
Silver medal – second place	2018 Toronto	100 m hurdles
Pan American Junior Championships
Silver medal – second place	2011 Miramar	100 m hurdles
CAC Junior Championships (U20)
Gold medal – first place	2010 Santo Domingo	100 m hurdles
Gold medal – first place	2010 Santo Domingo	4 × 100 m relay
Representing Americas
Continental Cup
Gold medal – first place	2018 Ostrava	100 m hurdles

Danielle Gracia Williams (born 14 September 1992) is a Jamaican track and field athlete specialising in the 100 metres hurdles. She is best known for winning gold medals at the 2015 World Championships and at the 2023 World Championships. In addition, she won a bronze medal at the 2019 World Championships, won two medals at Summer Universiades, bronze in 2013 and gold in 2015, won silver medals at the 2018 Commonwealth Games and the 2018 NACAC Championships, and represented her country at the 2013 World Championships, all in the 100 m hurdles.

Her older sister, Shermaine, is also a hurdler.

== Career ==
In 2013, Williams placed third in the 100 m hurdles at the Summer Universiade. Later that year, she competed at the World Championships in Moscow, where she made the semi-finals.

At the 2014 Commonwealth Games, Williams placed fourth in the 100 m hurdles, narrowly missing out on a medal.

Williams won gold at the 2015 Summer Universiade with a time of 12.78 s. She followed that up by winning gold at the 2015 World Championships in a new personal best of 12.57 s.

In 2017, Williams won the Jamaican Championships in a personal best time of 12.56 s, qualifying her for the World Championships where she made the semi-final.

The following year, she competed at the Commonwealth Games held on the Gold Coast, winning a silver medal behind Tobi Amusan. In June, Williams finished second at the Stockholm Diamond League in a new personal best of 12.48 s. The same month, Williams won the Jamaican Championships in 12.63 s. At the 2018 NACAC Championships in Toronto, Williams won a silver medal behind Kendra Harrison, clocking a time of 12.67 s. Williams won the Continental Cup in September with a time of 12.49 s.

Williams recorded her first Diamond League win at the Doha Diamond League in May 2019, running a time of 12.66 s. In July, she won the Müller Anniversary Games in a new national record of 12.32 s. At the Diamond League Final in Brussels, Williams won the 100 m hurdles in 12.46 s. She competed at the 2019 World Championships, winning the bronze medal.

In 2022, Williams set a new 60 m hurdles personal best of 7.75 s in Clemson. She competed at the World Championships in Eugene, finishing sixth. The next month, she represented Jamaica at the 2022 Commonwealth Games, also finishing sixth.

Williams finished third at the 2023 Jamaican Championships in 12.82 s, to qualify for the 2023 World Championships, where she won gold in a time of 12.43 s. She continued her good form by winning the Zurich Diamond League on 31 August in 12.54 s.

In 2024, Williams finished second behind Ackera Nugent at the Jamaican Championships, qualifying her for her first Olympics, where she went out in the semi-finals. The following year, Williams won the 2025 Kingston Slam on 5–6 April, finishing second in the 100 m hurdles in 12.70 s before winning the 100 m in 11.54 s. On 26 April, Williams also won at the Xiamen Diamond League in 12.53 s. She ran a new personal best of 12.31 s in finishing fourth at the Silesia Diamond League on 16 August.

== Statistics ==
=== Circuit performances ===
Grand Slam Track results
Slam	Race group	Event	Pl.	Time	Prize money
2025 Kingston Slam	Short hurdles	100 m hurdles	2nd	12.70	US$100,000
2025 Kingston Slam	Short hurdles	100 m	1st	11.54	US$100,000
2025 Philadelphia Slam	Short hurdles	100 m hurdles	7th	12.84	US$12,500
2025 Philadelphia Slam	Short hurdles	100 m	4th	11.44	US$12,500

=== Competition record ===
Year	Competition	Venue	Position	Event	Notes
Representing Jamaica
2010	CARIFTA Games (U20)	George Town, Cayman Islands	4th	100 m	11.72
2010	CARIFTA Games (U20)	George Town, Cayman Islands	3rd	4 × 100 m	45.69
2010	Central American and Caribbean; Junior Championships (U20)	Santo Domingo, Dom. Rep.	1st	100 m H	14.11
2010	Central American and Caribbean; Junior Championships (U20)	Santo Domingo, Dom. Rep.	1st	4 × 100 m	45.03
2010	World Junior Championships	Moncton, Canada	4th	100 m H	13.46 (+0.9 m/s)
2010	World Junior Championships	Moncton, Canada	4th	4 × 100 m	44.24
2011	Pan American Junior Championships	Miramar, United States	2nd	100 m H	13.32
2013	Universiade	Kazan, Russia	3rd	100 m H	12.84
2013	World Championships	Moscow, Russia	20th (sf)	100 m H	13.13
2014	Commonwealth Games	Glasgow, United Kingdom	4th	100 m H	13.06
2015	Universiade	Gwangju, South Korea	1st	100 m H	12.78
2015	World Championships	Beijing, China	1st	100 m H	12.57 PB
2016	World Indoor Championships	Portland, United States	–	60 m H	DNF
2017	World Championships	London, United Kingdom	18th (sf)	100 m H	13.14
2018	Commonwealth Games	Gold Coast, Australia	2nd	100 m H	12.78
2018	NACAC Championships	Toronto, Canada	2nd	100 m H	12.67
2019	World Championships	Doha, Qatar	3rd	100 m H	12.47
2022	World Indoor Championships	Belgrade, Serbia	33rd (h)	60 m H	8.23
2022	World Championships	Eugene, United States	6th	100 m H	12.44
2023	World Championships	Budapest, Hungary	1st	100 m H	12.43 SB
2024	Olympic Games	Paris, France	16th (sf)	100 m H	12.82
2025	World Championships	Tokyo, Japan	7th	100 m H	12.53
2026	World Ultimate Championship	Budapest, Hungary	11th (h)	100 m H	12.72

== Personal bests ==
Outdoor

- 100 metres – 11.24 (−0.7 m/s) (Pueblo 2013)
- 200 metres – 22.62 (−0.7 m/s) (Pueblo 2013)
- 100 metres hurdles – 12.31 (+1. 4 m/s) (Silesia 2025 )

Indoor

- 60 metres – 7.29 (Clemson 2022)
- 200 metres – 23.12 (Clemson 2020)
- 60 metres hurdles – 7.75 (Clemson 2022)
