= Shermaine Williams =

Jamaican hurdler

Personal information
- Born: 4 February 1990 (age 36) Saint Andrew Parish, Jamaica
- Height: 1.73 m (5 ft 8 in)
- Weight: 64 kg (141 lb)

Sport
- Country: Jamaica
- Sport: Athletics
- Event: Hurdling
Medal record
Representing Jamaica
Summer Universiade
Bronze medal – third place	2011 Shenzhen	4×100 m relay
World Junior Championships
Silver medal – second place	2008 Bydgoszcz	100 m hurdles
Pan American Junior Championships
Gold medal – first place	2009 Port of Spain	100 m hurdles
World Youth Championships
Silver medal – second place	2007 Ostrava	100 m hurdles
CARIFTA Games (U20)
Gold medal – first place	2007 Providenciales	100 m hurdles
CAC Junior Championships (U17)
Silver medal – second place	2006 Port of Spain	100 m hurdles
CARIFTA Games (Youth)
Silver medal – second place	2005 Bacolet	100 m hurdles
- Updated on 4 May 2023

Shermaine Williams (born 4 February 1990) is a Jamaican hurdler. At the 2012 and 2016 Summer Olympics, she competed in the Women's 100 metres hurdles. She is an alumna of Johnson C. Smith University.

Her younger sister, Danielle, is also a hurdler.

== Personal bests ==
Event	Result	Venue	Date
Outdoor
100 m	11.79 s (wind: +0.4 m/s)	Charlotte, United States	27 May 2010
200 m	23.98 s (wind: +1.9 m/s)	Petersburg, United States	17 April 2010
400 m	56.05 s	Charlotte, United States	15 March 2013
100 m hurdles	12.78 s (wind: +1.3 m/s)	Kingston, Jamaica	1 July 2012
Indoor
60 m	7.56 s	Hampton, United States	13 February 2011
200 m	23.83 s	Albuquerque, United States	15 March 2010
400 m	54.92 s	Blacksburg, United States	2 March 2013
60 m hurdles	8.07 s	Houston, United States	13 March 2009

== International competitions ==
Year	Competition	Venue	Position	Event	Notes
Representing Jamaica
2005	CARIFTA Games (U17)	Bacolet, Trinidad and Tobago	2nd	100m hurdles (76.2 cm)	13.93 (wind: -0.8 m/s)
2005	World Youth Championships	Marrakesh, Morocco	6th	100m hurdles (76.2 cm)	13.69 (wind: +1.1 m/s)
2006	Central American and Caribbean Junior Championships (U17)	Port of Spain, Trinidad and Tobago	2nd	100m hurdles (76.2 cm)	13.79 (wind: +1.3 m/s)
2007	CARIFTA Games (U20)	Providenciales, Turks and Caicos Islands	1st	100m hurdles	13.51 (wind: +1.3 m/s)
2007	World Youth Championships	Ostrava, Czech Republic	2nd	100m hurdles (76.2 cm)	13.48 (wind: -1.3 m/s)
2008	World Junior Championships	Bydgoszcz, Poland	2nd	100m hurdles	13.48 (wind: -2.4 m/s)
2009	Pan American Junior Championships	Port of Spain, Trinidad and Tobago	1st	100m hurdles	13.22 w (wind: +2.2 m/s)
2011	Universiade	Shenzhen, China	13th (sf)	100m hurdles	13.42 (wind: -0.4 m/s)
2011	Universiade	Shenzhen, China	3rd	4 × 100 m relay	43.57
2012	Olympic Games	London, United Kingdom	12th (sf)	100 m hurdles	12.83 (wind: +0.9 m/s)
2013	World Championships	Moscow, Russia	14th (sf)	100 m hurdles	12.93 (wind: +0.2 m/s)
2014	Pan American Sports Festival	Mexico City, Mexico	2nd	100m hurdles	12.91 (wind: +0.9 m/s) A
2015	World Championships	Beijing, China	7th	100 m hurdles	12.95
2016	Olympic Games	Rio de Janeiro, Brazil	9th (sf)	100 m hurdles	12.86
