= Kimberly Laing =

Jamaican hurdler (born 1988)

Kimberley Williams
Personal information
- Born: Kimberley A. Laing; January 8, 1988 (age 38) St. Catherine, Jamaica
- Education: The University of Alabama

Sport
- Sport: Track and field
- Event: 100 metres hurdles

Kimberley A. Laing Williams (born 8 January 1988 in St. Catherine) is a Jamaican athlete specialising in the 100 metres hurdles. She represented her country at the 2015 World Championships reaching the semifinals. In addition, she finished fourth at the 2015 Pan American Games.

Laing was an All-American hurdler for the Alabama Crimson Tide track and field team, finishing 7th in the 100 m hurdles at the 2010 NCAA Division I Outdoor Track and Field Championships.

Her personal bests are 12.89 seconds in the 100 metres hurdles (-1.1 m/s, Kingston 2015) and 8.23 seconds in the 60 metres hurdles (Fayetteville 2010).

== Competition record ==
Year	Competition	Venue	Position	Event	Notes
Representing Jamaica
2004	CARIFTA Games (U17)	Hamilton, Bermuda	2nd	100 m hurdles	14.76
2005	CARIFTA Games (U20)	Bacolet, Trinidad and Tobago	2nd	100 m hurdles	14.35
2006	CARIFTA Games (U20)	Les Abymes, Guadeloupe	1st	100 m hurdles	13.97
2007	Pan American Junior Championships	São Paulo, Brazil	3rd	100 m hurdles	13.85
2015	Pan American Games	Toronto, Canada	4th	100 m hurdles	12.95
2015	World Championships	Beijing, China	16th (sf)	100 m hurdles	13.00
Representing The University of Alabama
2010	2010 SEC Indoor Championships	Nashville, TN	Champion	60 m Hurdles	8.21
2010	2010 SEC Outdoor Championships	Knoxville, TN	Champion	100 m Hurdles	13.32
