= Sharika Nelvis =

American hurdler (born 1990)

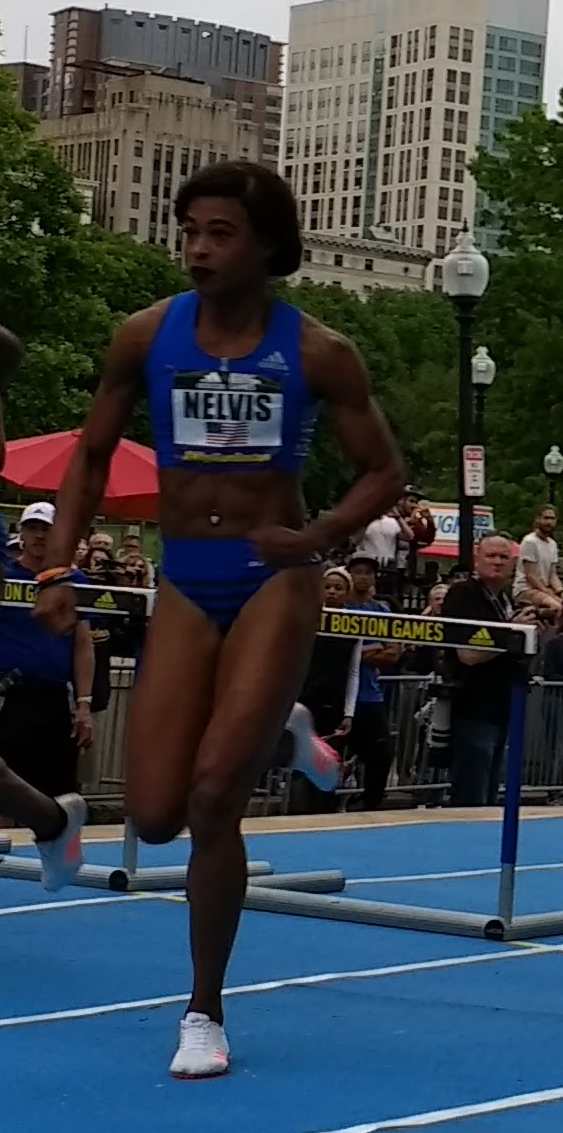
- Sharika Nelvis Boost Boston Games 2017

Personal information
- Nationality: American
- Born: May 10, 1990 (age 36)
- Education: Arkansas State Red Wolves
- Height: 5 ft 9 in (175 cm)
- Weight: 155 lb (70 kg)

Sport
- Country: United States
- Sport: Athletics; Track and field
- Position: 60 m hurdles 100 m hurdles
- Event: Hurdles
- University team: Arkansas State University
- Turned pro: 2014
Medal record
Event	1st	2nd	3rd
Olympic Games	0	0	0
World Championships	0	0	0
World Indoor Championships	0	0	0
Total	0	0	0
Event	1st	2nd	3rd
United States Olympic Trials (track and field)	0	0	0
USA Outdoor Track and Field Championships	0	0	2
USA Indoor Track and Field Championships	2	0	1
Total	2	0	3
- Updated on March 22, 2018

Sharika Renea Nelvis (born May 10, 1990) is an American hurdler. In 2014, she was NCAA indoor and outdoor sprint hurdles champion. After graduating from Arkansas State University that summer, Nelvis turned professional and topped the indoor world list in 2015. Nelvis represented the United States at the 2015 World Championships in Athletics in 100 m hurdles and the 2018 IAAF World Indoor Championships in 60 m hurdles. Nelvis won the women's 60 metres hurdles with a time of 7.70 at 2018 USA Indoor Track and Field Championships and repeated in 2019.

== Early life ==
Nelvis was born in Memphis, Tennessee on May 10, 1990. She had a difficult childhood; both of her parents died before she'd turned eight, and after her grandmother had a stroke Nelvis was taken in by an aunt and separated from three of her four siblings.

Nelvis took up track and field in sixth grade, competing first in the sprints and then also the hurdles and the long jump; in addition, she played volleyball, softball and basketball. She became a leading track athlete at Northside High School, winning four events at the 2009 class AAA Tennessee state championship meet.

== Collegiate career ==
After graduating from high school, Nelvis briefly attended Southwest Mississippi Community College, but found it did not suit her; she left almost immediately and transferred to Arkansas State University, having been recruited by its assistant track coach, fellow Memphis native Jason Brooks.

Nelvis missed the 2009–10 track and field season due to ineligibility resulting from her transfer, but after that, she developed rapidly under the coaching of Brooks and Arkansas State's head track coach Jim Patchell. In 2011, she was named the Sun Belt Conference's top freshman both indoors and outdoors. Over the next three years Nelvis won Sun Belt championships in the sprints, hurdles and long jump; she was named the conference's top track and field athlete indoors and outdoors in 2012 and again in 2013. She broke 13 seconds in the 100 m hurdles for the first time at the 2013 NCAA championships, winning her semi-final in 12.84 (+1.3); in the final she ran 12.92 and placed sixth, her first points finish in an NCAA meet.

In 2014, her senior year, Nelvis developed into America's top collegiate hurdler. She became NCAA indoor champion in the 60 m hurdles (7.93) and outdoor champion in the 100 m hurdles (12.52w), both times defeating a field that included Jasmin Stowers. Nelvis was named Sun Belt Female Athlete of the Year and won the Honda Sports Award for the best collegiate female track and field athlete in the nation; she was also short-listed for the Bowerman, but lost to middle-distance runner Laura Roesler of Oregon.

== Professional career ==
Nelvis started competing as a professional in 2015. After losing her first race she remained unbeaten during the 2015 indoor season, winning seven consecutive races; her winning time in Malmö (7.83) was her personal best and the fastest time in the world that winter, one-hundredth of a second ahead of Stowers.

Outdoors, Nelvis made her Diamond League debut in Doha, placing second to Stowers in a personal best 12.54. She then scored her first Diamond League victory in Rome, improving to 12.52 as Stowers, Brianna Rollins and Sally Pearson all crashed; the win moved her into an early lead in the 2015 Diamond Race. Nelvis entered the national outdoor championships as one of the favorites, and won her heat in a world-leading 12.34 (+1.9); the time moved her up to seventh on the world all-time list and third on the national all-time list. She also led the field in the semi-finals (12.37); in the final she only placed third in 12.59, and made the American team at 2015 US Outdoor Track & Field Championships for the World Championships in Beijing by one-hundredth of a second.

Nelvis won her first US title in the women's 60 metres hurdles with a time of 7.70 at 2018 USA Indoor Track and Field Championships where she set the NACAC & American record and earned a spot on Team USA at 2018 Birmingham World Championships where she placed 4th in 7.86.
