= Alina Talay =

Belarusian hurdler

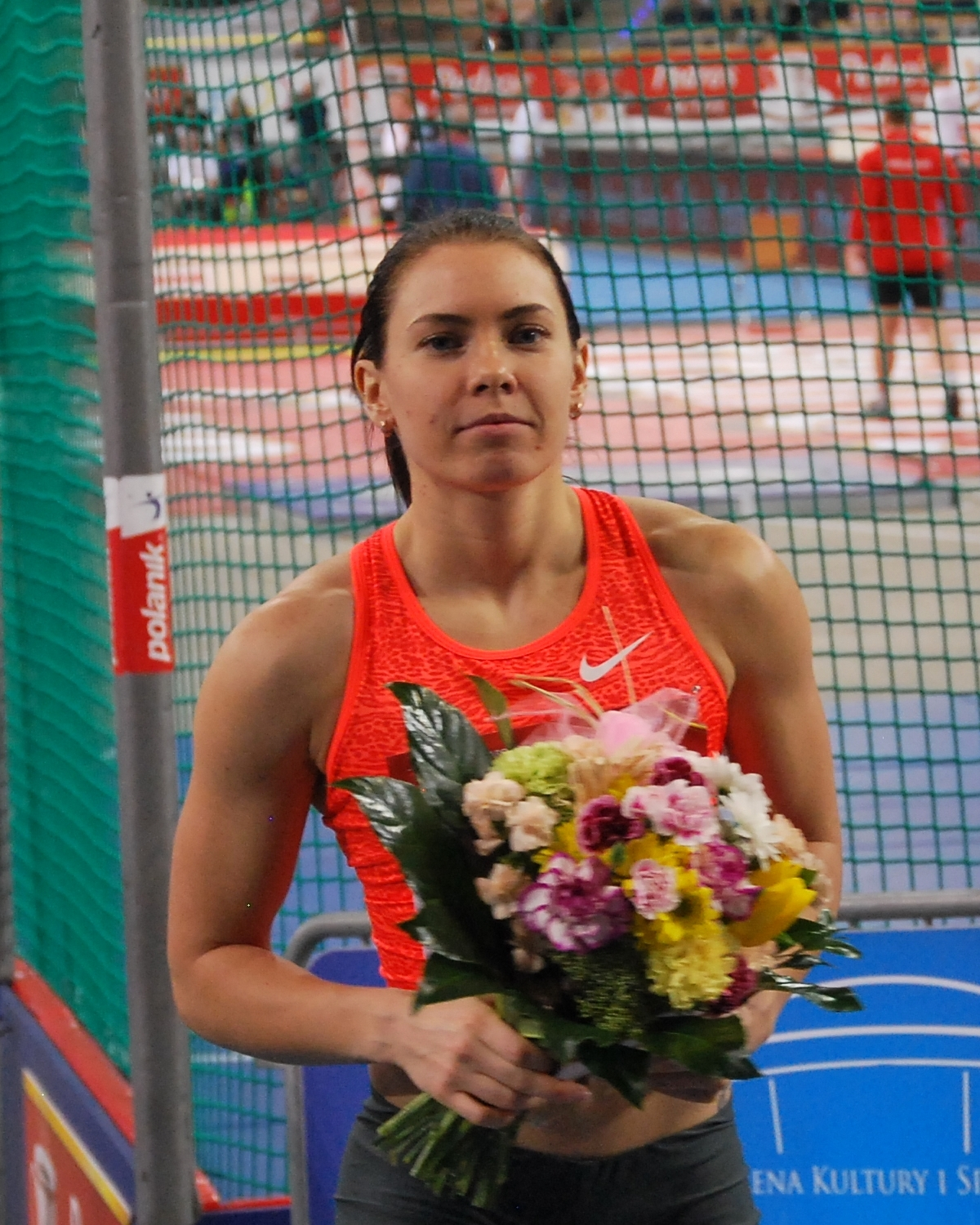
- Alina Talay in Pedro's Cup in Łódź (2016)

Personal information
- Full name: Alina Henadzeuna Talay
- Nationality: Belarusian
- Born: 14 May 1989 (age 37) Orsha, Soviet Union
- Height: 1.64 m (5 ft 5 in)
- Weight: 54 kg (119 lb)

Sport
- Sport: Athletics
- Event: 100 metres hurdles
- Coached by: Viktor Myasnikov. Philip Winfried (2015–)

Achievements and titles
- Personal bests: 100 m hurdles: 12.41 (2018); 60 m hurdles: 7.85 (2015)
Medal record
Women's athletics
Representing Belarus
World Championships
| Bronze medal – third place | 2015 Beijing | 100 m hurdles |
World Indoor Championships
| Bronze medal – third place | 2012 Istanbul | 60 m hurdles |
European Championships
| Gold medal – first place | 2012 Helsinki | 100 m hurdles |
| Silver medal – second place | 2016 Amsterdam | 100 m hurdles |
European Indoor Championships
| Gold medal – first place | 2013 Gothenburg | 60 m hurdles |
| Gold medal – first place | 2015 Prague | 60 m hurdles |
| Silver medal – second place | 2017 Belgrade | 60 m hurdles |
European Athletics U23 Championships
| Bronze medal – third place | 2009 Kaunas | 100 m hurdles |

Alina Henadzeuna Talay (Belarusian: Аліна Генадзеўна Талай; born 14 May 1989) is a Belarusian track and field athlete who specialises in the 100 metres hurdles.

== Career ==
She was fourth in the event at the 2008 World Junior Championships in Athletics and won the bronze medal at the 2009 European Athletics U23 Championships a year after. Talay began competing in the senior ranks in 2009 and was a semi-finalist in the 60 metres hurdles at the 2009 European Athletics Indoor Championships. She dipped under 13 seconds for the 100 m hurdles for the first time in 2010 and ended the year having a personal best of 12.87 seconds. That year she was a semi-finalist at both the 2010 IAAF World Indoor Championships and the 2010 European Athletics Championships.

Talay ran a best of 7.95 seconds for the 60 m hurdles at the 2011 European Athletics Indoor Championships and came fifth overall, making her first championship final. Still eligible for the age category competitions, she won at the 2011 European Athletics U23 Championships. She missed the World Championships, but competed at the 2011 Military World Games and won in a games record time of 12.95 seconds. She claimed her first world medal at the 2012 IAAF World Indoor Championships, taking the bronze. At the 2012 Summer Olympics, she raced in the 100 m hurdles and the 4 × 100 m relay. At the 2016 Olympics, she competed in the 100 m hurdles only.

Her personal bests are 12.41 seconds in the 100 metres hurdles (0.5 m/s, St. Polten 2018) and 7.85 seconds in the 60 metres hurdles (Prague 2015).

== International competitions ==
| Year | Competition | Venue | Position | Event | Notes |
Representing Belarus
| 2008 | World Junior Championships | Bydgoszcz, Poland | 4th | 100 m hurdles | 13.50 (-2.4 m/s) |
| 2009 | European U23 Championships | Kaunas, Lithuania | 3rd | 100 m hurdles | 13.30 (-2.0 m/s) |
| 2009 | European U23 Championships | Kaunas, Lithuania | 6th | 4 × 100 m relay | 44.86 |
| 2010 | World Indoor Championships | Doha, Qatar | 15th (sf) | 60 m hurdles | 8.18 |
| 2010 | European Championships | Barcelona, Spain | 15th (sf) | 100 m hurdles | DSQ |
| 2011 | European Indoor Championships | Paris, France | 5th | 60 m hurdles | 7.98 |
| 2011 | European Team Championships Super League | Stockholm, Sweden | 2nd | 100 m hurdles | 13.19 |
| 2011 | European U23 Championships | Ostrava, Czech Republic | 1st | 100 m hurdles | 12.91 (-1.0 m/s) |
| 2012 | World Indoor Championships | Istanbul, Turkey | 3rd | 60 m hurdles | 7.97 |
| 2012 | European Championships | Helsinki, Finland | 1st | 100 m hurdles | 12.91 |
| 2012 | Olympic Games | London, United Kingdom | 13th (sf) | 100 m hurdles | 12.84 |
| 2012 | Olympic Games | London, United Kingdom | 14th (h) | 4 × 100 m relay | 43.90 |
| 2013 | European Indoor Championships | Gothenburg, Sweden | 1st | 60 metres hurdles | 7.94 |
| 2013 | Universiade | Kazan, Russia | 2nd | 100 m hurdles | 12.78 |
| 2013 | World Championships | Moscow, Russia | 9th (sf) | 100 m hurdles | 12.82 |
| 2014 | European Championships | Zürich, Switzerland | 5th | 100 m hurdles | 12.97 |
| 2015 | European Indoor Championships | Prague, Czech Republic | 1st | 60 metres hurdles | 7.85 (NR) |
| 2015 | World Championships | Beijing, China | 3rd | 100 m hurdles | 12.66 (NR) |
| 2016 | World Indoor Championships | Portland, United States | 6th | 60 m hurdles | 8.00 |
| 2016 | European Championships | Amsterdam, Netherlands | 2nd | 100 m hurdles | 12.68 |
| 2016 | Olympic Games | Rio de Janeiro, Brazil | 21st (sf) | 100 m hurdles | 13.66 |
| 2017 | European Indoor Championships | Belgrade, Serbia | 2nd | 60 metres hurdles | 7.92 |
| 2017 | World Championships | London, United Kingdom | 6th | 100 m hurdles | 12.81 |
| 2018 | European Championships | Berlin, Germany | 2nd (sf) | 100 m hurdles | 12.76^{1} |
| 2019 | European Indoor Championships | Glasgow, United Kingdom | 15th (sf) | 60 m hurdles | 8.15 |

^{1}Disqualified in the final

== Personal bests ==
- 100 m hurdles: 12.41 (May 2018) NR
- 60 m hurdles: 7.85 (March 2015) NR
- 50 m hurdles: 6.89 (December 2011) NR
