= Brianna Rollins-McNeal =

American track and field athlete

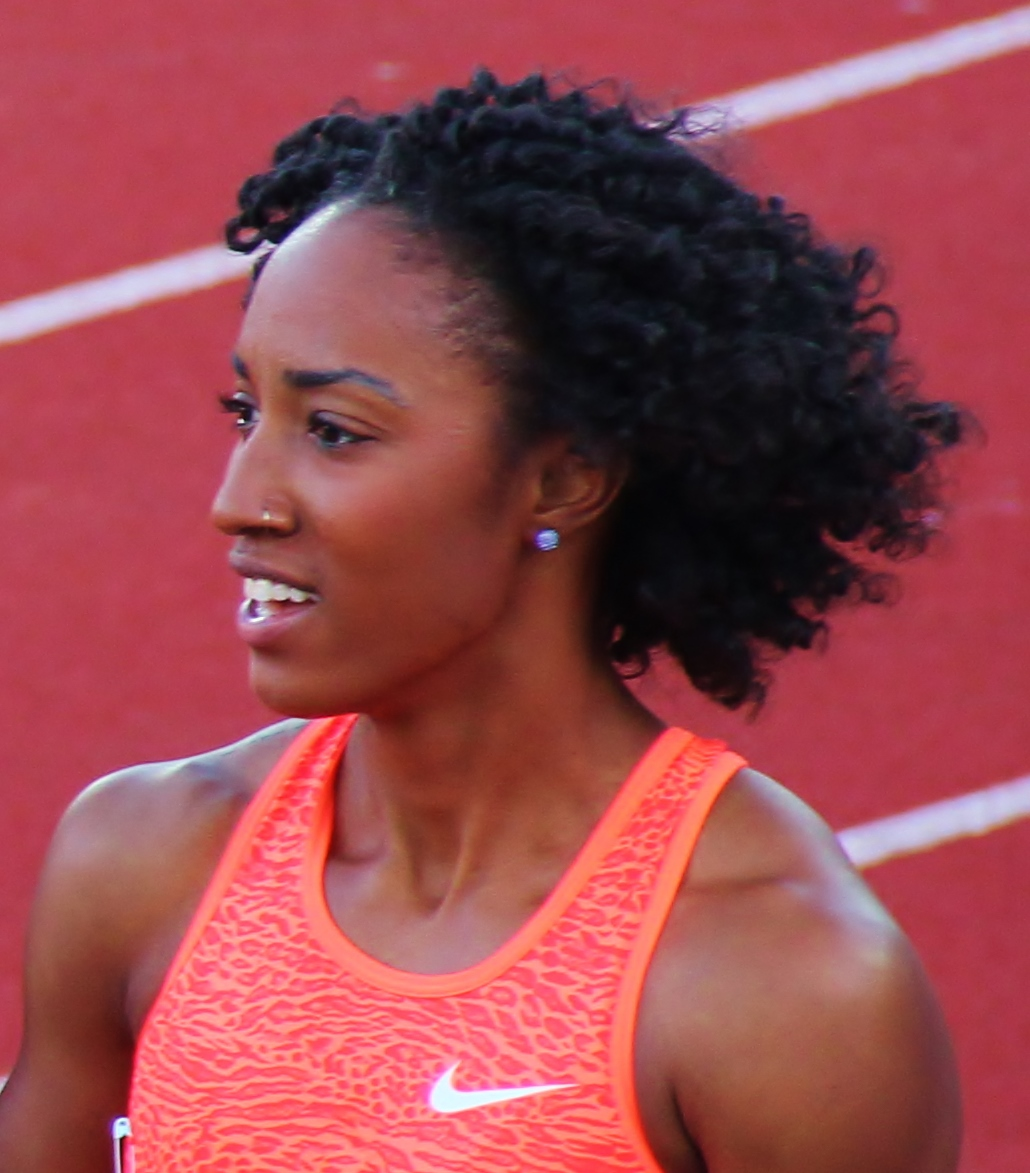
- Rollins at the 2015 Bislett Games

Personal information
- Born: Brianna Rollins; August 18, 1991 (age 35) Miami, Florida, U.S.
- Height: 5 ft 5 in (165 cm)
- Spouse: Bryce McNeal (m. 2017)

Sport
- Sport: Athletics
- Event: 100 metres hurdles

Achievements and titles
- Personal best: 60 m hurdles: 7.78 s (2013) 100 m hurdles: 12.26 s (2013)
Medal record
Olympic Games
Gold medal – first place	2016 Rio de Janeiro	100 m hurdles
World Championships
Gold medal – first place	2013 Moscow	100 m hurdles
World Indoor Championships
Silver medal – second place	2016 Portland	60 m hurdles
Diamond League
First place	2018	100 m hurdles

Brianna Rollins-McNeal (born August 18, 1991) is an American track and field athlete who specializes in the 100 metres hurdles. She is the 2016 Olympic champion and the 2013 World champion in the 100 metres hurdles. Her time of 12.26 ties her as the ninth-fastest 100 metre hurdler in history.

== Personal life ==
Rollins was born in Miami, Florida, daughter of Temperance Rollins. She is the eldest of seven siblings and the only female. She is a 2009 graduate of Miami Northwestern Senior High School. Rollins competed for Clemson University and graduated in 2013, majoring in travel and tourism. At Clemson, Rollins was a three-time NCAA champion: winning the 60 metres hurdles in 2011 and 2013 and the 100 metres hurdles in 2013. She turned professional following the 2013 NCAA Outdoor Championships, where she broke the NCAA record in the 100 m hurdles with a time of 12.39.

In 2017, she married Bryce McNeal in a ceremony in San Diego. The two met at Clemson where Bryce was part of the Tigers football team.

== Career ==
Rollins competed at the 2012 U.S. Olympic Trials, but did not make the Olympic team, finishing sixth in the 100 metres hurdles with a time of 12.94. The following month, at the 2012 NACAC Under-23 Championships, Rollins won gold in the 100 metres hurdles with a time of 12.60 (+4.5).

At the 2013 USA Track and Field Championships, Rollins won the 100 metres hurdles in an American record time of 12.26, bettering Gail Devers's previous record of 12.33 set in 2000. At the 2013 World Championships in Moscow, Rollins won the 100 metres hurdles with a time of 12.44, beating Olympic and reigning world champion Sally Pearson (12.50). In the final, Rollins had the slowest reaction time in the field (0.263), but was able to run down the field and win gold. For her performances in 2013, she was presented the Jackie Joyner-Kersee Athlete of the Year Award.

At the 2014 IAAF Diamond League, which consists of fourteen meetings from May to September, Rollins won one 100 metres hurdles race in Rome with a time of 12.53. At the 2014 USA Track and Field Championships, Rollins placed 5th in the 100 metres hurdles with a time of 12.81.

At the 2016 USA Indoor Track and Field Championships, Rollins won the 60 metres hurdles in 7.76 seconds. She finished second at 2016 IAAF World Indoor Championships in 60 m hurdles.

Brianna Rollins won in the 100 hurdles in a time of 12.34 at the 2016 United States Olympic Trials (track and field) ahead of Team USA teammates Kristi Castlin and Nia Ali to qualify to represent United States at Athletics at the 2016 Summer Olympics in Brazil. Not only did she win a gold medal, but her teammates placed second and third, making it the first time in history that one country gained all medals in this discipline at the Olympic Games, and the first time American women achieved such a sweep in any Olympic event.

She was banned for a year by the World Anti-Doping Agency after missing three drugs tests in 2016 – two of them after she forgot to update her whereabouts details when she was attending a fete of honor in her hometown and travelling to the White House to meet the president. Rollins was punished under the World Anti-Doping Agency Code for failing to properly file whereabouts information on three occasions in a 12-month period. The start of Rollins' 12-month period of ineligibility was backdated to 19 December 2016, the day on which WADA formally notified her of her potential rule violation. As a result, Rollins' competitive results obtained on and subsequent to 27 September 2016, the date of her third whereabouts failure, have been disqualified and any medals, points, and prizes are forfeited. She also was not able to compete in the 2017 World Championships in Women's 100 metres hurdles.

McNeal finished third at the 2019 USA Track & Field Outdoor Championships in the 100 metres hurdles in a season's best time of 12.61, qualifying for the 2019 World Athletics Championships. She was disqualified from the 100 m hurdles after a false start in qualification during the Doha World Championships.

In January 2021, McNeal was suspended from competition by the Athletics Integrity Unit following a missed drug test in January 2020. She denied the allegations and claimed that she was innocent and clean. The Athletics Integrity Unit's Disciplinary Tribunal declared that she intentionally altered 3 medical notes without verifying the details with the clinic or anyone else "as a reasonable person would have done". In a striking admission, McNeal confessed to not having written the date down at all because it was firmly fixed in her mind. The Tribunal dismissed her defense.

In June 2021, she was banned for five years for "tampering with the anti-doping testing process" which would effectively make her ineligible to participate in both 2020 Summer Olympics and in the 2024 Summer Olympics. Her official ban is set to be completed in August 2025. McNeal was made eligible to take part in US national trials for the 2020 Tokyo Olympics while she fought the suspension in the courts. However, as the disqualification was confirmed, the fourth place Gabbi Cunningham replaced McNeal. On 2 July 2021, the ban was upheld by CAS. Following the upholding of the ban, McNeal commented on social media that the presence of "white European men" on the Panel may have led to a different consideration than if she was a "white woman, or a European".

== Competition record ==
Year	Competition	Venue	Position	Event	Notes
Representing United States
2012	NACAC U23 Championships	Irapuato, Mexico	1st	100 m hurdles	12.60
2013	World Championships	Moscow, Russia	1st	100 m hurdles	12.44
2015	World Championships	Beijing, China	4th	100 m hurdles	12.67
2016	World Indoor Championships	Portland, Oregon, United States	2nd	60 m hurdles	7.82
2016	Olympic Games	Rio de Janeiro, Brazil	1st	100 m hurdles	12.48
2019	World Championships	Doha, Qatar	–	100 m hurdles	DQ

Awards
Preceded by Kimberlyn Duncan	The Bowerman (women's winner); 2013	Succeeded by Laura Roesler
