= Katsiaryna Paplauskaya =

Belarusian hurdler

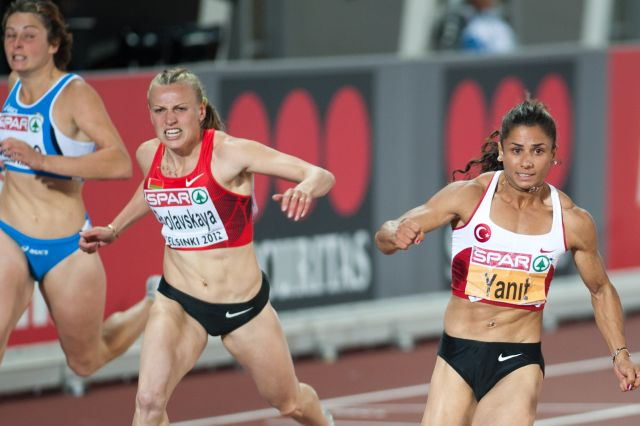
- Paplauskaya (center) at the 2012 European Championships.

Personal information
- Full name: Katsiaryna Paplauskaya
- Born: 7 May 1987 (age 39) Gomel

Sport
- Country: Belarus
- Sport: Athletics
- Event: 100 metres hurdles

Achievements and titles
- Regional finals: 3rd at the 2012 European Athletics Championships

Katsiaryna Paplauskaya (Belarusian: Кацярына Паплаўская; born 7 May 1987) is a Belarusian athlete who competes in the 100 metres hurdles with a personal best time of 12.88 seconds (set in Lapinlahti in 2016).

Paplauskaya won the bronze medal at the 2012 European Athletics Championships in Helsinki. She has competed at 2008 Summer Olympics and 2012 Summer Olympics.
