= 2002 European Athletics Championships – Women's 100 metres hurdles =

Women's 100 metres hurdles at the European Athletics Championships

The women's 100 metres hurdles at the 2002 European Athletics Championships were held at the Olympic Stadium on August 8–9.

== Medalists ==
Gold	Silver	Bronze
Glory Alozie; Spain	Olena Krasovska; Ukraine	Yana Kasova; Bulgaria

== Results ==
=== Heats ===
Qualification: First 2 of each heat (Q) and the next 6 fastest (q) qualified for the semifinals.

Wind:
Heat 1: +0.5 m/s, Heat 2: 0.0 m/s, Heat 3: -0.3 m/s, Heat 4: +0.3 m/s, Heat 5: +1.1 m/s

Rank	Heat	Name	Nationality	Time	Notes
1	1	Patricia Girard	France	13.00	Q
1	4	Haydy Aron	France	13.00	Q
3	2	Susanna Kallur	Sweden	13.01	Q
4	3	Svetlana Laukhova	Russia	13.02	Q
4	5	Svetla Dimitrova	Bulgaria	13.02	Q, SB
6	2	Glory Alozie	Spain	13.03	Q
6	5	Linda Ferga	France	13.03	Q
8	4	Olena Krasovska	Ukraine	13.04	Q
9	4	Irina Lenskiy	Israel	13.04	q
10	3	Yana Kasova	Bulgaria	13.07	Q
11	1	Aurelia Trywiańska	Poland	13.08	Q
11	4	Aneta Sosnowska	Poland	13.08	q
13	1	Diane Allahgreen	Great Britain	13.10	q
13	5	Tania Tambaki	Greece	13.10	q
15	2	Mariya Koroteyeva	Russia	13.23	q
16	2	Justyna Oleksy	Poland	13.31	
17	3	Judith Vis	Netherlands	13.31	q
18	1	Edit Vári	Hungary	13.32	
19	4	Derval O'Rourke	Ireland	13.41	
20	3	Flora Redoumi	Greece	13.42	
21	5	Johanna Halkoaho	Finland	13.45	
22	5	Kirsten Bolm	Germany	13.46	
23	3	Arantza Loureiro	Spain	13.47	
24	3	Jenny Kallur	Sweden	13.48	
25	3	Margaret Macchiut	Italy	13.48	
26	5	Svetlana Gnezdilov	Israel	13.50	
27	5	Daniela Wöckinger	Austria	13.52	
28	4	Manuela Bosco	Finland	13.60	
29	1	Lucie Martincová	Czech Republic	13.66	
30	4	Urska Beti	Slovenia	13.69	
31	4	Miriam Bobková	Slovakia	13.71	
32	1	Sabrina Previtali	Italy	13.74	
33	2	Mirjam Liimask	Estonia	13.75	
34	2	Barbara Panno	Italy	13.80	
35	2	Anila Meta	Albania	14.18	NR

=== Semifinals ===
Qualification: First 4 of each semifinal (Q) qualified directly for the final.

Wind:
Heat 1: 0.0 m/s, Heat 2: +0.6 m/s

Rank	Heat	Name	Nationality	Time	Notes
1	2	Glory Alozie	Spain	12.79	Q
2	1	Patricia Girard	France	12.82	Q
3	1	Olena Krasovska	Ukraine	12.88	Q
4	1	Diane Allahgreen	Great Britain	12.92	Q
5	2	Haydy Aron	France	12.93	Q, PB
6	1	Yana Kasova	Bulgaria	12.98	Q
7	2	Susanna Kallur	Sweden	13.02	Q
8	1	Aneta Sosnowska	Poland	13.04	PB
9	2	Svetla Dimitrova	Bulgaria	13.05	Q
10	2	Irina Lenskiy	Israel	13.05	
11	1	Svetlana Laukhova	Russia	13.06	
12	2	Aurelia Trywiańska	Poland	13.08	
13	1	Linda Ferga	France	13.11	
14	2	Tania Tambaki	Greece	13.18	
15	2	Mariya Koroteyeva	Russia	13.20	
16	1	Judith Vis	Netherlands	13.22	

=== Final ===
Wind: -0.7 m/s

Rank	Name	Nationality	Time	Notes
1st place, gold medalist(s)	Glory Alozie	Spain	12.73	
2nd place, silver medalist(s)	Olena Krasovska	Ukraine	12.88	
3rd place, bronze medalist(s)	Yana Kasova	Bulgaria	12.91	
4	Patricia Girard	France	13.03	
5	Diane Allahgreen	Great Britain	13.07	
5	Haydy Aron	France	13.07	
7	Susanna Kallur	Sweden	13.09	
8	Svetla Dimitrova	Bulgaria	13.75	
