= 2007 World Championships in Athletics – Women's 100 metres hurdles =

The 100 metres hurdles at the 2007 World Championships in Athletics was held at the Nagai Stadium in Osaka, Japan from August 27 to August 29.

== Summary ==
Bursting from the blocks in the final, Susanna Kallur took a narrow lead over the first hurdle slightly ahead of defending champion Michelle Perry. Over the next two hurdles, Kallur established a half metre gap on Perry, with returning silver medalist Delloreen Ennis-London almost matching Perry. After the fifth hurdle, Ennis-London started to spend more time in the air over the hurdles, losing ground. Virginia Powell and 2003 champion Perdita Felicien were gaining to award challenging Perry for second place. After the sixth hurdle, Kallur's lead began to shrink. By the ninth hurdle, the lead was gone, with Felicien holding a slight advantage over a wall of Powell, Perry, Kallur and Ennis-London. Going in to the tenth hurdle, Powell and Ennis-London lost a little ground while Perry, Kallur and Felicien were virtually even coming off the final hurdle. Two metres early, Perry began to lean, listing to her left with arms stretched back as in aerodynamic ski jumping form. She crossed the finish line a foot (30 cm) ahead of Felicien who was even less ahead of a virtual tie between Ennis-London and Kallur, with Ennis-London getting the nod for bronze.

== Medalists ==
Gold	Michelle Perry; United States (USA)
Silver	Perdita Felicien; Canada (CAN)
Bronze	Delloreen Ennis-London; Jamaica (JAM)

== Schedule ==
Date	Time	Round
27 August 2009	10:10	Heats
28 August 2009	19:35	Semi-finals
29 August 2009	21:05	Final

== Results ==
=== Heats ===
Qualification: First 3 in each heat (Q) and the next 4 fastest (q) advance to the semi-finals.

Rank	Heat	Name	Nationality	Time	Notes
1	4	Susanna Kallur	Sweden	12.66	Q
2	1	Michelle Perry	United States	12.72	Q
3	3	Perdita Felicien	Canada	12.73	Q
4	4	Delloreen Ennis-London	Jamaica	12.74	Q
5	3	Virginia Powell	United States	12.76	Q
6	3	Vonette Dixon	Jamaica	12.77	Q
7	2	Nevin Yanit	Turkey	12.78	Q
8	2	Angela Whyte	Canada	12.81	Q
9	1	Sally McLellan	Australia	12.85	Q
10	2	LoLo Jones	United States	12.86	Q
11	1	Adrianna Lamalle	France	12.88	Q
11	3	Flora Redoumi	Greece	12.88	q, SB
13	4	Nichole Denby	United States	12.91	Q
13	4	Anay Tejeda	Cuba	12.91	q
13	1	Derval O'Rourke	Ireland	12.91	q
16	2	Lacena Golding-Clarke	Jamaica	12.92	q
17	1	Priscilla Lopes	Canada	12.94	
18	2	Aleksandra Antonova	Russia	12.95	SB
19	4	Eline Berings	Belgium	12.97	NR
20	4	Tatyana Pavliy	Russia	12.99	
21	3	Yevgeniya Snihur	Ukraine	13.01	
22	4	Miriam Bobková	Slovakia	13.04	NR
23	2	Aurelia Trywiańska	Poland	13.05	
24	2	Christina Vukicevic	Norway	13.07	PB
25	2	Jenny Kallur	Sweden	13.08	SB
26	1	Toyin Augustus	Nigeria	13.10	
27	3	Natalya Ivoninskaya	Kazakhstan	13.12	
28	3	Nadine Faustin-Parker	Haiti	13.16	
29	1	Edit Vári	Hungary	13.28	
30	4	Mami Ishino	Japan	13.29	
31	3	Esen Kizildag	Turkey	13.48	SB
32	1	Jeimy Bernardez	Honduras	14.35	
33	3	Sumita Rani	Bangladesh	14.89	SB
34	1	María Gabriela Carrillo	El Salvador	15.78	

=== Semi-finals ===
Qualification: First 4 in each semi-final (Q) advance to the final.

Rank	Heat	Name	Nationality	Time	Notes
1	2	Michelle Perry	United States	12.55	Q
2	2	Perdita Felicien	Canada	12.61	Q, SB
3	1	Susanna Kallur	Sweden	12.64	Q
4	1	Angela Whyte	Canada	12.65	Q
4	2	Vonette Dixon	Jamaica	12.65	Q, PB
6	1	Delloreen Ennis-London	Jamaica	12.67	Q
6	2	Virginia Powell	United States	12.67	Q
8	1	LoLo Jones	United States	12.68	Q
9	1	Nichole Denby	United States	12.80	SB
10	2	Sally McLellan	Australia	12.82	
11	1	Lacena Golding-Clarke	Jamaica	12.85	SB
12	1	Nevin Yanit	Turkey	12.85	
13	1	Flora Redoumi	Greece	12.88	SB
14	2	Anay Tejeda	Cuba	12.89	
15	2	Adrianna Lamalle	France	12.93	
16	2	Derval O'Rourke	Ireland	12.98	

=== Final ===
Wind: -0.1 m/s

Rank	Lane	Name	Nationality	Time	Notes
1st place, gold medalist(s)	6	Michelle Perry	United States	12.46	
2nd place, silver medalist(s)	4	Perdita Felicien	Canada	12.49	SB
3rd place, bronze medalist(s)	3	Delloreen Ennis-London	Jamaica	12.50	PB
4	5	Susanna Kallur	Sweden	12.51	PB
5	9	Virginia Powell	United States	12.55	
6	2	LoLo Jones	United States	12.62	
7	8	Vonette Dixon	Jamaica	12.64	PB
8	7	Angela Whyte	Canada	12.66	
