= 2006 European Athletics Championships – Women's 100 metres hurdles =

Women's 100 metres hurdles at the European Athletics Championships

The women's 100 metres hurdles at the 2006 European Athletics Championships were held at the Ullevi on August 10 and August 11.

== Medalists ==
Gold	Silver	Silver
Susanna Kallur; Sweden	Kirsten Bolm; Germany	Derval O'Rourke; Ireland

== Schedule ==
Date	Time	Round
August 10, 2006	10:45	Round 1
August 11, 2006	18:10	Semifinals
August 11, 2006	19:50	Final

== Results ==
KEY:	q	Fastest non-qualifiers	Q	Qualified	NR	National record	PB	Personal best	SB	Seasonal best

=== Round 1 ===
Qualification: First 2 in each heat (Q) and the next 6 fastest (q) advance to the semifinals.

Rank	Heat	Name	Nationality	Time	Notes
1	1	Susanna Kallur	Sweden	12.70	Q
2	4	Kirsten Bolm	Germany	12.83	Q
3	4	Jenny Kallur	Sweden	12.92	Q, SB
4	2	Aleksandra Antonova	Russia	12.94	Q
5	5	Aurelia Trywiańska	Poland	12.96	Q
6	5	Glory Alozie	Spain	12.98	Q
7	2	Derval O'Rourke	Ireland	13.03	Q
8	1	Tatyana Pavliy	Russia	13.06	Q
9	3	Adrianna Lamalle	France	13.07	Q
9	5	Reïna-Flor Okori	France	13.07	q
11	4	Esen Kızıldağ	Turkey	13.15	q
11	5	Micol Cattaneo	Italy	13.15	q, PB
13	4	Olga Korsunova	Russia	13.21	q
14	2	Margaret Macchiut	Italy	13.27	q
15	3	Flora Redoumi	Greece	13.28	Q
16	4	Sara McGreavy	United Kingdom	13.30	q
17	2	Nicole Ramalalanirina	France	13.34	
18	5	Piia Roslund	Finland	13.35	PB
19	1	Sarah Claxton	United Kingdom	13.39	
20	3	Gemma Bennett	United Kingdom	13.40	
21	4	Petra Seidlová	Czech Republic	13.41	
22	1	Edit Vári	Hungary	13.42	
22	5	Eline Berings	Belgium	13.42	
24	3	Lucie Martincová	Czech Republic	13.45	
25	2	Johanna Halkoaho	Finland	13.47	
25	3	Irina Lenskiy	Israel	13.47	
27	2	Radmila Vukmirović	Slovenia	13.49	
28	1	Victoria Schreibeis	Austria	13.54	
28	2	Mirjam Liimask	Estonia	13.54	
28	5	Marie Elisabeth Maurer	Austria	13.54	
31	1	Arantza Loureiro	Spain	13.56	
32	2	Andrea Ivančević	Croatia	13.60	
33	3	Aliuska López	Spain	13.73	
34	1	Alexándra Kómnou	Greece	13.76	
35	4	Marina Tomić	Slovenia	13.79	
36	5	Barbara Rustignoli	San Marino	16.05	
—N/a	3	Nevin Yanıt	Turkey		DNF

=== Semifinals ===
First 4 of each Semifinal will be directly qualified (Q) for the Final.

==== Semifinal 1 ====
Rank	Lane	Name	Nationality	React	Time	Notes
1	3	Kirsten Bolm	Germany	0.154	12.85	Q
2	6	Glory Alozie	Spain	0.182	12.89	Q
3	4	Aleksandra Antonova	Russia	0.152	12.98	Q
4	5	Jenny Kallur	Sweden	0.169	13.04	Q
5	7	Reïna-Flor Okori	France	0.187	13.08	
6	1	Flora Redoumi	Greece	0.182	13.15	
7	8	Olga Korsunova	Russia	0.179	13.29	
8	2	Margaret Macchiut	Italy	0.158	13.31	

==== Semifinal 2 ====
Rank	Lane	Name	Nationality	React	Time	Notes
1	5	Susanna Kallur	Sweden	0.177	12.76	Q
2	4	Adrianna Lamalle	France	0.173	12.93	Q
3	6	Derval O'Rourke	Ireland	0.139	12.94	Q
4	3	Aurelia Trywiańska	Poland	0.153	12.98	Q
5	2	Tatyana Pavliy	Russia	0.160	13.00	
6	1	Esen Kizildag	Turkey	0.182	13.24	
7	7	Micol Cattaneo	Italy	0.169	13.38	
8	8	Sara McGreavy	United Kingdom	0.160	13.67	

=== Final ===
Rank	Lane	Name	Nationality	React	Time	Notes
1st place, gold medalist(s)	4	Susanna Kallur	Sweden	0.171	12.59	
2nd place, silver medalist(s)	5	Kirsten Bolm	Germany	0.148	12.72	
2nd place, silver medalist(s)	1	Derval O'Rourke	Ireland	0.140	12.72	NR
4	3	Glory Alozie	Spain	0.204	12.86	
5	8	Aurelia Trywiańska	Poland	0.153	12.90	
6	2	Aleksandra Antonova	Russia	0.134	12.93	
7	7	Jenny Kallur	Sweden	0.213	12.94	
8	6	Adrianna Lamalle	France	0.197	12.99	
