= 2002 European Athletics Indoor Championships – Women's 60 metres hurdles =

The women's 60 metres hurdles event at the 2002 European Athletics Indoor Championships was held on March 2.

== Medalists ==
Gold	Silver	Bronze
Linda Ferga; France	Kirsten Bolm; Germany	Patricia Girard; France

Note: Glory Alozie of Spain originally won gold with 7.84, but was later disqualified as she was not yet eligible to compete for Spain after having switched allegiance from Nigeria.

== Results ==
=== Heats ===
First 2 of each heat (Q) and the next 2 fastest (q) qualified for the final.

Rank	Heat	Name	Nationality	Time	Notes
1	2	Patricia Girard	France	7.91	Q, SB
2	2	Flora Redoumi	Greece	8.01	Q, NR
3	1	Kirsten Bolm	Germany	8.04	Q
3	2	Nadine Hentschke	Germany	8.04	q, PB
3	3	Linda Ferga	France	8.04	Q
3	3	Diane Allahgreen	Great Britain	8.04	q
7	1	Nicole Ramalalanirina	France	8.06	Q
8	1	Irina Lenskiy	Israel	8.09	
9	3	Mariya Koroteyeva	Russia	8.20	
10	2	Derval O'Rourke	Ireland	8.22	NR
11	1	Margaret Macchiut	Italy	8.27	
12	2	Svetlana Laukhova	Russia	8.28	
13	3	Urska Beti	Slovenia	8.29	SB
14	1	Rachel King	Great Britain	8.31	
15	1	Elke Wölfling	Austria	8.32	SB
16	1	Mirjam Liimask	Estonia	8.33	
17	3	Daniela Wöckinger	Austria	8.34	
18	2	Lucie Škrobáková	Czech Republic	8.35	
19	3	Edit Vári	Hungary	8.37	
20	1	Esen Kizildag	Turkey	8.51	PB
21	2	Anila Meta	Albania	8.80	
	2	Marie Maurer	Austria	DQ	
	3	Glory Alozie	Spain	DQ	
	3	Svetlana Ganzdilov	Israel	DNF	

=== Final ===
Rank	Name	Nationality	Time	Notes
1st place, gold medalist(s)	Linda Ferga	France	7.96	SB
2nd place, silver medalist(s)	Kirsten Bolm	Germany	7.97	
3rd place, bronze medalist(s)	Patricia Girard	France	7.98	
4	Nicole Ramalalanirina	France	8.01	
5	Flora Redoumi	Greece	8.02	
6	Diane Allahgreen	Great Britain	8.06	
7	Nadine Hentschke	Germany	8.20	
	Glory Alozie	Spain	DQ	
