= 2005 European Athletics Indoor Championships – Women's 60 metres hurdles =

The women's 60 metres hurdles event at the 2005 European Athletics Indoor Championships was held on March 5–6.

== Medalists ==
| Gold | Silver | Bronze |
|---|---|---|
| Susanna Kallur; Sweden | Jenny Kallur; Sweden | Kirsten Bolm; Germany |

== Results ==
=== Heats ===
First 4 of each heat (Q) and the next 4 fastest (q) qualified for the semifinals.

| Rank | Heat | Name | Nationality | Time | Notes |
|---|---|---|---|---|---|
| 1 | 2 | Jenny Kallur | Sweden | 7.92 | Q, PB |
| 2 | 3 | Susanna Kallur | Sweden | 7.96 | Q |
| 3 | 1 | Nicole Ramalalanirina | France | 7.99 | Q, SB |
| 4 | 2 | Derval O'Rourke | Ireland | 8.02 | Q, NR |
| 4 | 3 | Patricia Girard | France | 8.02 | Q, SB |
| 6 | 1 | Kirsten Bolm | Germany | 8.04 | Q |
| 7 | 2 | Diane Allahgreen | Great Britain | 8.05 | Q |
| 8 | 3 | Sarah Claxton | Great Britain | 8.06 | Q |
| 9 | 2 | Irina Shevchenko | Russia | 8.07 | Q |
| 10 | 1 | Lucie Martincová | Czech Republic | 8.10 | Q |
| 10 | 3 | Aliuska López | Spain | 8.10 | Q, SB |
| 12 | 3 | Nadine Hentschke | Germany | 8.11 | q |
| 13 | 1 | Glory Alozie | Spain | 8.16 | Q |
| 14 | 2 | Judith Ritz | Germany | 8.18 | q |
| 15 | 1 | Micol Cattaneo | Italy | 8.19 | q, PB |
| 16 | 1 | Flora Redoumi | Greece | 8.21 | q |
| 17 | 3 | Georgia Stoyiannidou | Greece | 8.23 | |
| 18 | 1 | Mirjam Liimask | Estonia | 8.25 | |
| 18 | 2 | Marina Tomić | Slovenia | 8.25 | |
| 20 | 2 | Reina-Flor Okori | France | 8.27 | |
| 21 | 2 | Patricia Vieira | Portugal | 8.33 | |
| 22 | 3 | Miriam Bobková | Slovakia | 8.35 | |
| 23 | 3 | Margaret Macchiut | Italy | 8.35 | |
| | 1 | Yevgeniya Likhuta | Belarus | DQ | |

=== Semifinals ===
First 4 of each semifinals qualified directly (Q) for the final.

| Rank | Heat | Name | Nationality | Time | Notes |
|---|---|---|---|---|---|
| 1 | 2 | Susanna Kallur | Sweden | 7.90 | Q, =WL |
| 2 | 2 | Kirsten Bolm | Germany | 7.92 | Q, SB |
| 3 | 1 | Jenny Kallur | Sweden | 7.93 | Q |
| 4 | 1 | Nadine Hentschke | Germany | 8.00 | Q, PB |
| 5 | 1 | Glory Alozie | Spain | 8.00 | Q |
| 6 | 1 | Patricia Girard | France | 8.04 | Q |
| 7 | 1 | Sarah Claxton | Great Britain | 8.05 | |
| 8 | 2 | Diane Allahgreen | Great Britain | 8.07 | Q |
| 9 | 1 | Derval O'Rourke | Ireland | 8.09 | |
| 10 | 1 | Flora Redoumi | Greece | 8.10 | |
| 11 | 2 | Irina Shevchenko | Russia | 8.11 | Q |
| 12 | 2 | Nicole Ramalalanirina | France | 8.12 | |
| 13 | 2 | Aliuska López | Spain | 8.15 | |
| 14 | 1 | Lucie Martincová | Czech Republic | 8.20 | |
| 15 | 2 | Judith Ritz | Germany | 8.21 | |
| 16 | 2 | Micol Cattaneo | Italy | 8.30 | |

=== Final ===
| Rank | Lane | Name | Nationality | Time | React | Notes |
|---|---|---|---|---|---|---|
| 1st place, gold medalist(s) | 6 | Susanna Kallur | Sweden | 7.80 | 0.175 | WL, NR |
| 2nd place, silver medalist(s) | 3 | Jenny Kallur | Sweden | 7.99 | 0.209 | |
| 3rd place, bronze medalist(s) | 5 | Kirsten Bolm | Germany | 8.00 | 0.134 | |
| 4 | 8 | Glory Alozie | Spain | 8.00 | 0.209 | |
| 5 | 1 | Irina Shevchenko | Russia | 8.02 | 0.142 | |
| 6 | 7 | Patricia Girard | France | 8.04 | 0.144 | |
| 7 | 3 | Nadine Hentschke | Germany | 8.07 | 0.140 | |
| 8 | 2 | Diane Allahgreen | Great Britain | 8.15 | 0.148 | |
