= 2006 IAAF World Indoor Championships – Women's 60 metres hurdles =

The Women's 60 metres hurdles event at the 2006 IAAF World Indoor Championships was held on March 11.

== Medalists ==
Gold	Silver	Bronze
Derval O'Rourke; Ireland	Glory Alozie; Spain	Susanna Kallur; Sweden

== Results ==
=== Heats ===
First 4 of each heat (Q) and next 4 fastest (q) qualified for the semifinals.

Rank	Heat	Name	Nationality	Time	Notes
1	3	Michelle Freeman	Jamaica	7.90	Q
2	3	Derval O'Rourke	Ireland	7.93	Q
3	2	Susanna Kallur	Sweden	7.96	Q
4	2	Damu Cherry	United States	7.97	Q
5	1	Lacena Golding-Clarke	Jamaica	7.98	Q
6	2	Adrianna Lamalle	France	8.02	Q, PB
7	3	Glory Alozie	Spain	8.03	Q
8	1	Danielle Carruthers	United States	8.04	Q
8	1	Feng Yun	China	8.04	Q, NR
8	2	Aurelia Trywiańska-Kollasch	Poland	8.04	Q
11	1	Kirsten Bolm	Germany	8.05	Q
11	3	Anay Tejeda	Cuba	8.05	Q, SB
13	3	Jenny Kallur	Sweden	8.06	q, SB
14	2	Sarah Claxton	Great Britain	8.07	q
15	3	Tatyana Pavliy	Russia	8.07	q
16	2	Maíla Machado	Brazil	8.08	AR
16	3	Nadine Faustin-Parker	Haiti	8.08	q
18	1	Nicole Ramalalanirina	France	8.14	
19	1	Alexandra Komnou	Greece	8.14	
20	1	Olga Korsunova	Russia	8.25	
21	2	Solène Eboulabeka	Republic of the Congo	8.88	
22	3	María Gabriela Carrillo	El Salvador	9.14	PB

=== Semifinals ===
First 4 of each semifinal (Q) qualified directly for the final.

Rank	Heat	Name	Nationality	Time	Notes
1	2	Derval O'Rourke	Ireland	7.87	Q, NR
2	2	Glory Alozie	Spain	7.88	Q, SB
3	1	Kirsten Bolm	Germany	7.91	Q, SB
4	2	Jenny Kallur	Sweden	7.93	Q, SB
5	1	Lacena Golding-Clarke	Jamaica	7.94	Q
6	1	Susanna Kallur	Sweden	7.95	Q
7	1	Danielle Carruthers	United States	7.95	Q
8	2	Damu Cherry	United States	7.96	Q
9	1	Aurelia Trywiańska-Kollasch	Poland	7.97	
10	1	Adrianna Lamalle	France	8.06	
11	1	Tatyana Pavliy	Russia	8.06	PB
12	2	Nadine Faustin-Parker	Haiti	8.07	
13	2	Feng Yun	China	8.12	
14	1	Sarah Claxton	Great Britain	8.19	
15	2	Anay Tejeda	Cuba	8.25	
16	2	Michelle Freeman	Jamaica	36.17	

=== Final ===
Rank	Lane	Name	Nationality	Time	React	Notes
1st place, gold medalist(s)	3	Derval O'Rourke	Ireland	7.84	0.141	NR
2nd place, silver medalist(s)	4	Glory Alozie	Spain	7.86	0.151	SB
3rd place, bronze medalist(s)	2	Susanna Kallur	Sweden	7.87	0.140	
4	1	Danielle Carruthers	United States	7.88	0.157	PB
5	5	Kirsten Bolm	Germany	7.93	0.166	
6	6	Lacena Golding-Clarke	Jamaica	7.94	0.139	
7	7	Damu Cherry	United States	7.95	0.155	PB
8	8	Jenny Kallur	Sweden	7.98	0.170	
