= 2009 European Athletics Indoor Championships – Women's 60 metres hurdles =

The Women's 60 metres hurdles event at the 2009 European Athletics Indoor Championships was held on March 6.

== Medalists ==
| Gold | Silver | Bronze |
|---|---|---|
| Eline Berings; Belgium | Lucie Škrobáková; Czech Republic | Derval O'Rourke; Ireland |

== Results ==
=== Heats ===
First 3 of each heat (Q) and the next 4 fastest (q) qualified for the semifinals.

| Rank | Heat | Name | Nationality | Time | Notes |
|---|---|---|---|---|---|
| 1 | 4 | Eline Berings | Belgium | 8.00 | Q |
| 2 | 2 | Christina Vukicevic | Norway | 8.05 | Q |
| 3 | 1 | Derval O'Rourke | Ireland | 8.06 | Q |
| 4 | 3 | Lucie Škrobáková | Czech Republic | 8.07 | Q |
| 4 | 3 | Carolin Nytra | Germany | 8.07 | Q |
| 4 | 4 | Sarah Claxton | Great Britain | 8.07 | Q |
| 7 | 2 | Anastasiya Solovyova | Russia | 8.10 | Q |
| 8 | 1 | Nadine Hildebrand | Germany | 8.11 | Q |
| 9 | 1 | Elisabeth Davin | Belgium | 8.13 | Q |
| 10 | 3 | Yuliya Kondakova | Russia | 8.17 | Q |
| 10 | 4 | Alina Talay | Belarus | 8.17 | Q, PB |
| 12 | 2 | Micol Cattaneo | Italy | 8.18 | Q |
| 12 | 4 | Cindy Billaud | France | 8.18 | q |
| 14 | 4 | Aleksandra Antonova | Russia | 8.19 | q |
| 15 | 1 | Glory Alozie | Spain | 8.20 | q |
| 16 | 2 | Jelena Jotanović | Serbia | 8.24 | q |
| 17 | 1 | Katsiaryna Paplauskaya | Belarus | 8.28 | |
| 17 | 3 | Esen Kizildag | Turkey | 8.28 | |
| 19 | 3 | Lisa Urech | Switzerland | 8.31 | |
| 20 | 4 | Ana Torrijos | Spain | 8.32 | |
| 21 | 1 | Kadri Viigipuu | Estonia | 8.34 | |
| 22 | 4 | Angela Moroșanu | Romania | 8.35 | |
| 23 | 2 | Gemma Bennett | Great Britain | 8.75 | |
| 24 | 3 | Patricia Girard | France | 8.98 | |
| 25 | 2 | Barbara Rustignoli | San Marino | 9.36 | |
| | 2 | Miriam Bobková | Slovakia | DQ | |

=== Semifinals ===
First 4 of each semifinals qualified directly (Q) for the final.

| Rank | Heat | Name | Nationality | Time | Notes |
|---|---|---|---|---|---|
| 1 | 2 | Sarah Claxton | Great Britain | 7.96 | Q, NR |
| 2 | 1 | Derval O'Rourke | Ireland | 8.00 | Q |
| 3 | 2 | Eline Berings | Belgium | 8.01 | Q |
| 4 | 1 | Christina Vukicevic | Norway | 8.02 | Q |
| 5 | 1 | Anastasiya Solovyova | Russia | 8.02 | Q, PB |
| 6 | 1 | Cindy Billaud | France | 8.05 | Q, PB |
| 6 | 1 | Carolin Nytra | Germany | 8.05 | PB |
| 6 | 2 | Lucie Škrobáková | Czech Republic | 8.05 | Q |
| 9 | 1 | Elisabeth Davin | Belgium | 8.07 | PB |
| 10 | 1 | Yuliya Kondakova | Russia | 8.08 | |
| 11 | 2 | Nadine Hildebrand | Germany | 8.14 | Q |
| 12 | 2 | Aleksandra Antonova | Russia | 8.15 | |
| 13 | 2 | Alina Talay | Belarus | 8.20 | |
| 14 | 1 | Glory Alozie | Spain | 8.21 | |
| 14 | 2 | Micol Cattaneo | Italy | 8.21 | |
| 16 | 2 | Jelena Jotanović | Serbia | 8.26 | |

=== Final ===
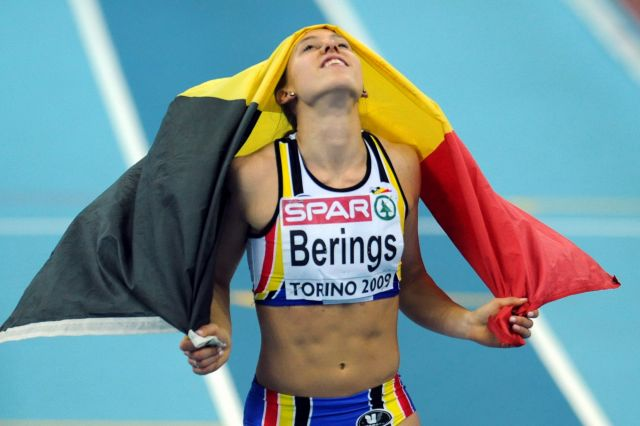
Eline Berings won the gold for Belgium.

| Rank | Name | Nationality | React | Time | Notes |
|---|---|---|---|---|---|
| 1st place, gold medalist(s) | Eline Berings | Belgium | 0.233 | 7.92 | NR |
| 2nd place, silver medalist(s) | Lucie Škrobáková | Czech Republic | 0.201 | 7.95 | NR |
| 3rd place, bronze medalist(s) | Derval O'Rourke | Ireland | 0.181 | 7.97 | SB |
| 4 | Christina Vukicevic | Norway | 0.174 | 8.04 | |
| 5 | Anastasiya Solovyova | Russia | 0.168 | 8.05 | |
| 6 | Nadine Hildebrand | Germany | 0.179 | 8.16 | |
| 7 | Cindy Billaud | France | 0.160 | 8.19 | |
| 8 | Sarah Claxton | Great Britain | 0.197 | 8.21 | |
