= 2007 European Athletics Indoor Championships – Women's 60 metres hurdles =

The Women's 60 metres hurdles event at the 2007 European Athletics Indoor Championships was held on March 2.

== Medalists ==
Gold	Silver	Bronze
Susanna Kallur; Sweden	Aleksandra Antonova; Russia	Kirsten Bolm; Germany

== Results ==
=== Heats ===
First 2 of each heat (Q) and the next 2 fastest (q) qualified for the final.

Rank	Heat	Name	Nationality	Time	Notes
1	1	Susanna Kallur	Sweden	7.84	Q, SB
2	1	Irina Shevchenko	Russia	7.90	Q, SB
3	3	Aleksandra Antonova	Russia	7.95	Q
4	2	Reina-Flor Okori	France	8.01	Q
5	2	Kirsten Bolm	Germany	8.05	Q
5	3	Aurelia Trywiańska	Poland	8.05	Q
7	3	Eline Berings	Belgium	8.07	q, NR
8	1	Sara McGreavy	Great Britain	8.10	q
9	3	Nevin Yanit	Turkey	8.11	
10	1	Adrianna Lamalle	France	8.12	
11	2	Tatyana Pavliy	Russia	8.17	
12	1	Edit Vári	Hungary	8.24	
13	3	Alice Decaux	France	8.27	
14	2	Esen Kızıldağ	Turkey	8.38	
15	3	Johanna Halkoaho	Finland	8.41	
16	1	Arantza Loureiro	Spain	8.57	
17	1	Zanda Grava	Latvia	8.58	
18	3	Jelena Jotanović	Serbia	8.59	
	2	Flora Redoumi	Greece	DQ	
	2	Andrea Ivančević	Croatia	DNS	

=== Final ===
Rank	Lane	Name	Nationality	Time	Notes
1st place, gold medalist(s)	6	Susanna Kallur	Sweden	7.87	
2nd place, silver medalist(s)	5	Aleksandra Antonova	Russia	7.94	
3rd place, bronze medalist(s)	2	Kirsten Bolm	Germany	7.97	SB
4	3	Irina Shevchenko	Russia	8.01	
5	7	Sara McGreavy	Great Britain	8.04	
6	4	Reina-Flor Okori	France	8.08	
7	1	Aurelia Trywiańska	Poland	8.25	
8	8	Eline Berings	Belgium	8.56	
