= 2008 IAAF World Indoor Championships – Women's 60 metres hurdles =

== Medalists ==
Gold
| LoLo Jones | United States |
Silver
| Candice Davis | United States |
Bronze
| Anay Tejeda | Cuba |

== Heats ==
| Heat | Lane | Name | Country | Mark | Q | React |
|---|---|---|---|---|---|---|
| 1 | 4 | Susanna Kallur | Sweden | 7.87 | Q | 0.259 |
| 1 | 8 | Lacena Golding-Clarke | Jamaica | 8.01 | Q | 0.230 |
| 1 | 2 | Eline Berings | Belgium | 8.05 NR | Q | 0.151 |
| 1 | 6 | Angela Whyte | Canada | 8.16 | | 0.221 |
| 1 | 7 | Reïna-Flor Okori | France | 8.18 | | 0.256 |
| 1 | 5 | Glory Alozie | Spain | 8.19 SB | | 0.173 |
| 1 | 3 | Esen Kizildag | Turkey | 8.33 SB | | 0.277 |
| 2 | 2 | Nevin Yanit | Turkey | 8.09 | Q | 0.255 |
| 2 | 4 | Yuliya Kondakova | Russia | 8.13 | Q | 0.187 |
| 2 | 5 | Cindy Billaud | France | 8.20 | Q | 0.151 |
| 2 | 3 | Yauhenia Valadzko | Belarus | 8.27 | | 0.257 |
| 2 | 7 | Toyin Augustus | Nigeria | 8.46 | | 0.233 |
| 2 | 8 | Priscilla Lopes-Schliep | Canada | 8.66 | | 0.206 |
| 2 | 6 | Fadwa Al Bouza | Syria | 9.06 SB | | 0.272 |
| 3 | 2 | Anay Tejeda | Cuba | 7.93 | Q | 0.133 |
| 3 | 5 | Micol Cattaneo | Italy | 8.02 PB | Q | 0.149 |
| 3 | 3 | Candice Davis | United States | 8.02 | Q | 0.149 |
| 3 | 4 | Miriam Bobková | Slovakia | 8.08 | q | 0.181 |
| 3 | 7 | Kia Davis | Liberia | 8.14 | q | 0.195 |
| 3 | 6 | Flóra Redoúmi | Greece | DNF | | 0.242 |
| 4 | 7 | Josephine Onyia | Spain | 7.84 PB | Q | 0.171 |
| 4 | 4 | LoLo Jones | United States | 7.96 | Q | 0.184 |
| 4 | 5 | Aleksandra Antonova | Russia | 8.05 | Q | 0.123 |
| 4 | 8 | Sarah Claxton | United Kingdom | 8.12 | q | 0.207 |
| 4 | 6 | Yevgeniya Snihur | Ukraine | 8.16 | q | 0.134 |
| 4 | 3 | Denisa Šcerbová | Czech Republic | 8.42 | | 0.235 |
| 4 | 2 | Anne Møller | Denmark | 8.54 | | 0.256 |

== Semifinals ==
| Heat | Lane | Name | Country | Mark | Q | React |
|---|---|---|---|---|---|---|
| 1 | 6 | LoLo Jones | United States | 7.82 | Q | 0.192 |
| 1 | 5 | Josephine Onyia | Spain | 8.00 | Q | 0.269 |
| 1 | 7 | Yuliya Kondakova | Russia | 8.01 | Q | 0.188 |
| 1 | 2 | Yevgeniya Snihur | Ukraine | 8.06 PB | Q | 0.130 |
| 1 | 4 | Micol Cattaneo | Italy | 8.10 | | 0.225 |
| 1 | 3 | Nevin Yanit | Turkey | 8.19 | | 0.251 |
| 1 | 8 | Cindy Billaud | France | 8.19 | | 0.212 |
| 1 | 1 | Miriam Bobková | Slovakia | 8.24 | | 0.236 |
| 2 | 5 | Anay Tejeda | Cuba | 7.96 | Q | 0.228 |
| 2 | 4 | Candice Davis | United States | 7.99 | Q | 0.160 |
| 2 | 3 | Lacena Golding-Clarke | Jamaica | 8.00 | Q | 0.224 |
| 2 | 7 | Aleksandra Antonova | Russia | 8.07 | Q | 0.132 |
| 2 | 1 | Sarah Claxton | United Kingdom | 8.07 SB | | 0.218 |
| 2 | 8 | Eline Berings | Belgium | 8.10 | | 0.138 |
| 2 | 2 | Kia Davis | Liberia | 8.10 | | 0.205 |
| 2 | 6 | Susanna Kallur | Sweden | DNS | | |

== Final ==
| Heat | Lane | Name | Country | Mark | React |
|---|---|---|---|---|---|
| Gold medal | 5 | LoLo Jones | United States | 7.80 | 0.161 |
| Silver medal | 3 | Candice Davis | United States | 7.93 | 0.145 |
| Bronze medal | 6 | Anay Tejeda | Cuba | 7.98 | 0.184 |
| 4 | 8 | Lacena Golding-Clarke | Jamaica | 8.01 | 0.227 |
| 5 | 1 | Aleksandra Antonova | Russia | 8.02 | 0.165 |
| 6 | 2 | Yevgeniya Snihur | Ukraine | 8.12 | 0.237 |
| 7 | 7 | Yuliya Kondakova | Russia | 10.19 | 0.239 |
| 8 | 4 | Josephine Onyia | Spain | 43.72 | 0.253 |
