= 1994 World Junior Championships in Athletics – Women's 100 metres hurdles =

The women's 100 metres hurdles event at the 1994 World Junior Championships in Athletics was held in Lisbon, Portugal, at Estádio Universitário de Lisboa on 21 and 22 July.

== Medalists ==
Gold	Kirsten Bolm; Germany
Silver	LaTasha Colander; United States
Bronze	Diane Allahgreen; United Kingdom

== Results ==
=== Final ===
22 July
Wind: +0.5 m/s

Rank	Name	Nationality	Time	Notes
1st place, gold medalist(s)	Kirsten Bolm	Germany	13.26	
2nd place, silver medalist(s)	LaTasha Colander	United States	13.30	
3rd place, bronze medalist(s)	Diane Allahgreen	United Kingdom	13.31	
4	Chen Zhenhong	China	13.59	
5	Ingvild Larsen	Norway	13.66	
6	Carmen Banks	United States	13.72	
7	Nikola Špinová	Czech Republic	13.74	
	Astia Walker	Jamaica	DNF	

=== Semifinals ===
21 July

==== Semifinal 1 ====
Wind: +1.0 m/s

Rank	Name	Nationality	Time	Notes
1	LaTasha Colander	United States	13.30	Q
2	Chen Zhenhong	China	13.32	Q
3	Astia Walker	Jamaica	13.37	Q
4	Ingvild Larsen	Norway	13.67	Q
5	Katia Brito	Cuba	13.70	
6	Rachel Links	Australia	13.74	
7	Claudia Ruge	Germany	14.10	
	Orla Bermingham	United Kingdom	DNF	

==== Semifinal 2 ====
Wind: +1.1 m/s

Rank	Name	Nationality	Time	Notes
1	Diane Allahgreen	United Kingdom	13.25	Q
2	Kirsten Bolm	Germany	13.48	Q
3	Carmen Banks	United States	13.65	Q
4	Nikola Špinová	Czech Republic	13.67	Q
5	Vanina Fouet	France	13.87	
6	Fan Min-Hua	Chinese Taipei	13.91	
7	Myriam Tschomba	Belgium	13.98	
	Yelena Ovcharova	Ukraine	DNF	

=== Heats ===
21 July

==== Heat 1 ====
Wind: +0.5 m/s

Rank	Name	Nationality	Time	Notes
1	Astia Walker	Jamaica	13.40	Q
2	Diane Allahgreen	United Kingdom	13.48	Q
3	Claudia Ruge	Germany	13.87	Q
4	Katia Brito	Cuba	13.88	q
5	Adri van der Merwe	South Africa	13.96	
6	Francis Seally	Canada	13.98	
7	Rachel Rogers	Fiji	14.01	
8	Wenche Selbo	Norway	14.82	

==== Heat 2 ====
Wind: +2.2 m/s

Rank	Name	Nationality	Time	Notes
1	Kirsten Bolm	Germany	13.46 w	Q
2	Orla Bermingham	United Kingdom	13.87 w	Q
3	Fan Min-Hua	Chinese Taipei	13.94 w	Q
4	Aurelia Trywiańska	Poland	14.10 w	
5	Aya Tanaka	Japan	14.17 w	
6	Edit Vári	Hungary	14.55 w	
7	Gillian Ragus	Australia	17.94 w	

==== Heat 3 ====
Wind: +0.4 m/s

Rank	Name	Nationality	Time	Notes
1	Yelena Ovcharova	Ukraine	13.29	Q
2	Carmen Banks	United States	13.63	Q
3	Ingvild Larsen	Norway	13.70	Q
4	Emmanuelle Devaud	Switzerland	14.01	
5	Lisa Duffus	Canada	14.12	
6	Nadine Fensham	South Africa	14.24	
7	Barbara Panno	Italy	14.28	
8	Sévérine Troonen	Belgium	14.85	

==== Heat 4 ====
Wind: +2.9 m/s

Rank	Name	Nationality	Time	Notes
1	Chen Zhenhong	China	13.35 w	Q
2	LaTasha Colander	United States	13.54 w	Q
3	Nikola Špinová	Czech Republic	13.60 w	Q
4	Vanina Fouet	France	13.66 w	q
5	Rachel Links	Australia	13.69 w	q
6	Myriam Tschomba	Belgium	13.89 w	q
7	Kristina Pihl	Sweden	13.96 w	
8	Gilda Massa	Peru	14.31 w	

== Participation ==
According to an unofficial count, 31 athletes from 23 countries participated in the event.

- Australia (2)
- Belgium (2)
- Canada (2)
- China (1)
- Chinese Taipei (1)
- Cuba (1)
- Czech Republic (1)
- Fiji (1)
- France (1)
- Germany (2)
- Hungary (1)
- Italy (1)
- Jamaica (1)
- Japan (1)
- Norway (2)
- Peru (1)
- Poland (1)
- South Africa (2)
- Sweden (1)
- Switzerland (1)
- Ukraine (1)
- United Kingdom (2)
- United States (2)
