= Bobková =

Bobková is a surname. Notable people with the surname include:

- Hana Bobková (1929–2017), Czech gymnast
- Miriam Bobková (born 1979), Slovak sprint hurdler
- Radka Bobková (born 1973), Czech tennis player
