= Lolo Jones =

American hurdler and bobsledder

Lolo Jones OLY
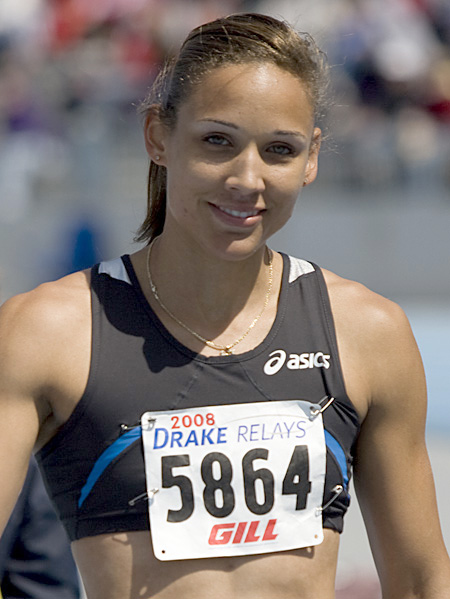
- Jones at the 2008 Drake Relays in Des Moines, Iowa

Personal information
- Nickname: Lolo
- Nationality: American
- Born: Lori Susan Jones; August 5, 1982 (age 44) Des Moines, Iowa, U.S.
- Height: 5 ft 9 in (175 cm)
- Weight: 135 lb (61 kg)–160 lb (73 kg) (Note: Jones weighs 133 pounds when competing in hurdles and 160 pounds when competing in bobsled.)

Sport
- Sport: Track and field, bobsleigh
- Events: 100 m hurdles, two-woman
- College team: Louisiana State University

Achievements and titles
- Personal bests: 100 m 11.24 (Stuttgart 2006); 100 m hurdles 12.43 (2008 Olympic Games)
Medal record
Women's athletics
Representing the United States
World Indoor Championships
Gold medal – first place	2008 Valencia	60 m hurdles
Gold medal – first place	2010 Doha	60 m hurdles
IAAF World Athletics Final
Gold medal – first place	2008 Stuttgart	100 m hurdles
NACAC Championships
Gold medal – first place	2015 Costa Rica	100 m hurdles
Women's bobsleigh
Representing United States
World Championships
Gold medal – first place	2013 St. Moritz	Mixed team
Gold medal – first place	2021 Alternberg	Two-woman

Lori Susan "Lolo" Jones (born August 5, 1982) is an American hurdler and bobsledder who specializes in the 60-meter and 100-meter hurdles. She won three NCAA titles and garnered 11 All-American honors while at Louisiana State University. She won indoor national titles in 2007, 2008, and 2009 in the 60-meter hurdles, with gold medals at the World Indoor Championship in 2008 and 2010, and won outdoor national titles in 2008 and 2010 in the 100-meter hurdles.

She was favored to win the 100-meter hurdles at the 2008 Beijing Olympics, but tripped on the penultimate hurdle, finishing in seventh place. She went on to win gold at the 2008 World Athletics Final, beating the newly crowned Olympic champion Dawn Harper with a time of 12.56. Jones was the American record holder in the 60-meter hurdles with a time of 7.72 until 2018 when both Kendra Harrison and Sharika Nelvis improved the time to 7.70.

Jones also competes as a brakewoman on the U.S. national bobsled team. She won a gold medal in the mixed team event at the 2013 World Championships and in the two-woman bobsled at the 2021 World Championships. She represented the U.S. at the 2014 Winter Olympics, making her one of the few athletes who has competed in both the Summer and Winter Olympic Games.

Outside of the Olympics, Jones has also appeared on many reality TV shows, such as Dancing with the Stars, Celebrity Big Brother, The Challenge, and Name That Tune.

== Early life ==
Jones was born on August 5, 1982, in Des Moines, Iowa. She attended eight schools in eight years while her single mother, Lori, often held down two jobs to support her family of six. Jones' father spent most of her childhood in the Air Force and later in state prison. When Jones was in third grade, her family settled in the basement of a Des Moines Salvation Army church. During the summer when day camps were offered at the church, Jones would wake up early to avoid being teased by other kids if they found out she was living in the basement.

When her family was about to make another move, to Forest City, Iowa, Jones told her mother, "Mom, I can't go to a city that doesn't have a track. I'm trying to pursue my dream." She was, however, mistaken, as Forest City High School did, in fact, have a track. Jones and her family parted ways, and her mentor, Coach Ferguson, arranged for her to live with four different families during her enrollment at Theodore Roosevelt High School in Des Moines. One of those who took Jones in was Janis Caldwell, who had seen Jones compete at Roosevelt. Jones stayed with the Caldwells after her senior year at Roosevelt, while she attended college, trained and worked part-time at the Iowa Bakery Cafe, a local coffee shop.

During her junior and senior years, she lived with the family of medical writing consultant Marilyn K. Hauk and her then-husband, former Des Moines Register assistant managing editor Randy Essex. Hauk and Essex already knew Jones through the Des Moines Area Youth Track Club. Knowing that she showed such promise, they asked Des Moines youth coach Phil Ferguson if they could help. They became part of a community that nurtured her, which included teachers at Roosevelt High School who made sure that she put together the right classes to be ready for college, an orthodontist who reduced the cost of her braces and an attorney who handled paperwork pro bono to assure she was covered by health insurance. Jean and Kim Walker and later Janis Caldwell also welcomed her into their homes. Jones went on to receive college degrees in economics and Spanish.

At Roosevelt, she excelled in the classroom, keeping her grades up and playing the cello in the school orchestra. She was named Gatorade Midwest Athlete of the Year and set a record at the Iowa state track meet with a mark of 13.40 seconds for the 100-meter hurdles.

== College track and field career ==
Jones originally intended to enroll at Iowa State University through its Upward Bound/Science Bound program. Instead, she followed the lead of elite hurdler Kim Carson, who was her role model and Caldwell's goddaughter. Carson was an All-American and national champion at Louisiana State University. Like Carson, Jones competed on LSU's track team.

In 2002, she was runner-up in both 100-meter hurdles and 4 × 100-meter relay at the NCAA Outdoor Championships. In 2003, Jones won the 60-meter Hurdles at the NCAA Indoor Championships. She was later part of the winning 4 × 100-meter team at the 2003 NCAA Outdoor Championships. In the 2004 indoor campaign, she finished second at the NCAA Championships in both the 60-meter hurdles and 60-meter dash. In her 2004 outdoor season, she won the 100-meter hurdles title at the NCAA Mideast Region Championships, the SEC Championships, and the Penn Relays. At the 2004 NCAA Outdoor Championships, she won another national title as a member of the winning 4 × 100-meter team. Her career at LSU saw her finish as an 11-time All-American and a 6-time SEC champion, and she is ranked among the top-three women for all-time in both the 60-meter hurdles and 100-meter hurdles.

After failing to qualify for the 2004 Summer Olympics in Athens, Greece, Jones found herself contemplating her future. When Jones told Shaver she wanted to retire from track, he replied, "I'll see you at practice tomorrow." Despite any second thoughts, Jones' heart led her back to running. Jones' financial situation also was still a concern, forcing her to choose to focus on track and not earning a steady paycheck, or using her economics degree to get a regular job. To save money, Jones would leave the air conditioner off, which meant suffering through the hot Louisiana summer days. She also held several different part-time jobs after college, including working at Home Depot, waiting tables, and a personal trainer at a gym.

== Professional track and field career ==
=== 2004–2008: Early professional career ===
After a disappointing finish at the 2004 U.S. Olympic Outdoor Trials, Jones finished second in her first professional meet at Stuttgart. She had a stellar 2006 campaign, which saw her win at Heusden-Zolder in July, running a personal best time of 12.56. At the 2006 World Athletics Final, she finished sixth in the 100 m hurdles and fifth in the 100 m. She also did well on the European circuit, winning a meet in Ostrava. She finished the 2006 season ranked fourth in the U.S. and seventh in the world by Track & Field News.

Jones won her first national championship in 2007, winning the 60 m hurdles at the USA Indoor Championships with a time of 7.88 seconds. In the European winter circuit, Jones won two meets and finished second in two others in the 60 m hurdles. In April, she won the 100 m hurdles at the Drake Relays. At the 2007 USA Outdoor Track and Field Championships, Jones finished third in the 100 m hurdles, thereby earning a spot on the U.S. Team at the World Championships in Osaka, Japan, where she finished sixth. On the summer track circuit, Jones won meets at Rethimno and Heusden along with second-place finishes at Doha, Sheffield, and Monaco.

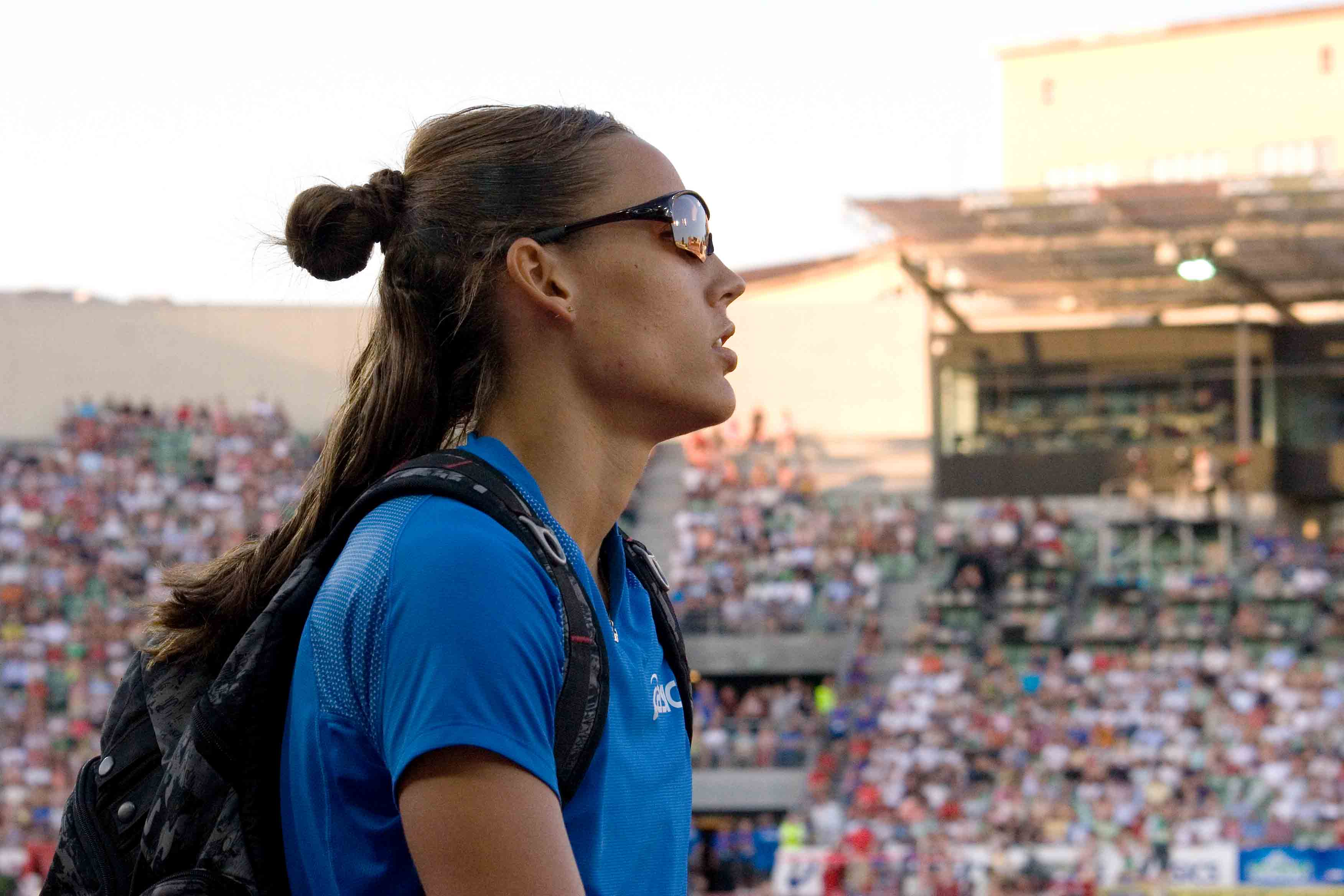
Jones at the 2008 Bislett Games

=== 2008–09: Major championship frustration ===
Jones started the 2008 season with hopes of making the 2008 Summer Olympics. She began the indoor campaign with second-place finishes in Glasgow, Gothenburg, and Stuttgart in the 60 m hurdles. She then picked up a win in Düsseldorf, setting a meet record in the process. In Karlsruhe, Jones ran a personal best time of 7.77 seconds and finished second to Susanna Kallur, who broke the world record with a time of 7.68 seconds. Jones' time was the second-fastest ever by an American. She was named USA Track & Field's Athlete of the Week on February 12 for her performance in Karlsruhe. At the 2008 USA Indoor Championships, Jones won her second straight national championship with a time of 7.88 seconds and also won the Visa Championship Series title for the 2008 indoor season. At the World Indoor Championships in Valencia, Spain, Jones won the 60 m hurdles with a time of 7.80 for her first world championship.

Jones opened the 2008 outdoor season with a first-place finish at the LSU Alumni Gold meet in Baton Rouge, setting a stadium record in the process.

At the 2008 Beijing Olympics, Jones was favored to win the 100-meter hurdles. In the final, she was pulling away from the pack when she clipped the 9th hurdle (of 10) and stumbled, breaking stride to drop her back to a 7th-place finish. Teammate Dawn Harper surged through to win gold. Jones was seen pounding the ground close to tears, trying to comprehend what had happened. "You hit a hurdle about twice a year where it affects your race. It's just a shame that it happened on the biggest race of my life." Jones was later seen crying to herself in a hallway, mouthing, "why, why, why?" Jones reports she played basketball with Angela Whyte that night while talking about their losses.

According to the SEC-sponsored, ESPN Films' documentary Lolo about Jones' life (and her personal telling of the story during it), the "clipping" of the ninth hurdle at the 2008 Beijing Olympics was attributed to a spinal problem. The doctor who treated her said that the problem was so bad that he would examine her feet and ask which toe of which foot he was touching and she told him that she couldn't feel anything. The doctor said that the problem was that, since she couldn't feel her feet, her brain wasn't able to process where they were, leading to the "clipping" in the medal race in Beijing. Also according to the documentary, the doctor operated on Jones to repair the problem and the operation was a success.

Jones began the 2009 indoor season in Europe, scoring victories in the 60 m hurdles with world-leading times of 7.82 seconds in Karlsruhe and Birmingham. She returned to the States and won the national indoor title in the 60 m hurdles. A hamstring injury at her hometown meet, the Drake Relays, caused her to miss a month's worth of training but she returned in time for the outdoor national championships. She did not repeat her indoor success, however, as her arms collided with Michelle Perry in the semi-finals and fell, missing out on the opportunity to compete at the 2009 World Championships in Berlin. Vowing to salvage her season, she returned to Europe to compete on the major World Athletics Tour meets, but she only finished seventh and eighth in Oslo and Lausanne. She returned to form in Rethymno, beating Priscilla Lopes-Schliep and Damu Cherry with a world-leading time of 12.47 seconds.

She faced strong competition on the European circuit: Jones took third at the London Grand Prix behind Sally McLellan and Perdita Felicien, and a run of 12.61 seconds was only enough for third again at Herculis. She ran her second-fastest time of the season (12.51) at the DN Galan meeting, but she was beaten to the line by Lopes-Schliep. She re-injured her hamstring at Weltklasse Zürich, ruling her out for the rest of the season. Having missed the major championships and suffered injuries, the 2009 season was largely disappointing for Jones, although she took solace from having run the second fastest time that season.

=== 2010 and 2011 seasons ===
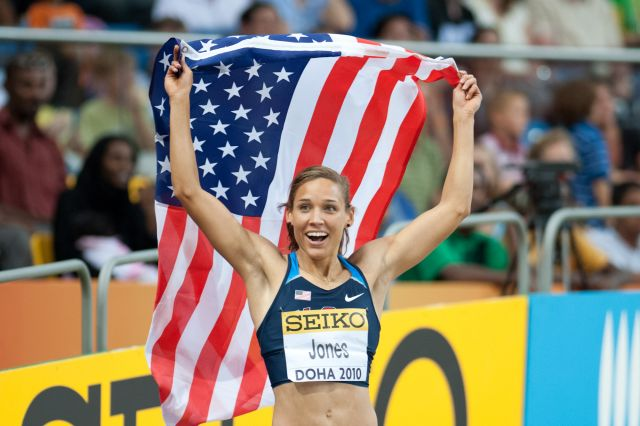
Jones during 2010 IAAF World Indoor Championships in Doha

Jones defended her 60 m hurdles Indoor World Title in Doha after finishing with a time of 7.72, a new American record. Due to there being no major championships for Americans, Jones then traveled to Europe and competed in mainly Diamond League events. After wins in Doha, Oslo, New York and Monaco, going into the last Diamond League race, Jones was tied at the top of the standings with Canadian Priscilla Lopes-Schliep. Lopes-Schliep won the final race which left Jones second in the overall standings.

Jones made her 2011 race debut at Aviva International match, Kelvin Hall in Glasgow. Jones finished the race in fourth with a time of 8.27 after hitting the third hurdle. A close third-place finish followed in Stuggart, with Jones finishing in 7.94 behind Carolin Nytra (7.92) and Christina Vukicevic (7.93). Injury and illness forced Jones to miss the rest of the indoor season.

=== 2012 Summer Olympics ===
On June 23, 2012, Jones placed third in the 100 m hurdles at the U.S. Olympics trials, qualifying her for a spot on the 2012 Summer Olympics team.

At the London Olympics on August 6, Jones won her heat in the 100-meter hurdles with a time of 12.68 s. On August 7, she placed third in the semi-finals of the 100-meter hurdles, gaining progression to the finals. In the finals later that day Jones finished fourth with a time of 12.58 s.

=== 2013 ===
In May 2013, Jones earned her first win of the 2013 season at the Seiko Golden Grand Prix in Tokyo. She clocked 12.92 seconds in the race – well behind her Drake time of 12.79 and Queen Harrison's 2013 world-leading time of 12.71 due to the headwind – to hold off Wells, who was still fast enough to finish with silver in 13.07 seconds.

=== 2015 ===
At the 2015 USA Outdoor Track and Field Championships, Jones advanced to the finals. She qualified for the NACAC Championships in Costa Rica. Jones won the NACAC Championships women's 100 m hurdles in 12.63 {4.1 wind}.

=== 2020 Return to Competition ===
On March 7, 2020, Jones ran her first outdoor race in three years at the 2020 Mississippi College Season Opener in Clinton, Mississippi, participating in the 100 Meters Hurdles & 100 Meters events. Jones won the 100 Meters Hurdles final with 13.45 (−0.1 wind) and the 100 Meters Dash final with 11.93 (1.3 wind).

=== 2023 Masters World Record ===
As a 40 year old on January 21, Jones ran 8.38 for the 60 m hurdles in the preliminary round at the Iowa Hawkeyes Invitational. Her time took over a third of a second off of Monica Pelligrinelli's 2006 W40 world record. The race also qualified her for the finals where she improved upon her own record by another .03 to 8.35.

=== 2024 US Olympic Trials ===
With an entry time of 13.10, Jones earned a spot in the 100 m hurdles at the 2024 US Olympic Trials, 12 years after her last trials appearance in the event.

== Bobsledding ==
Jones was introduced to bobsledding by Elana Meyers. After a disappointing 2008 Olympics campaign where she failed to medal, she took up the sport and gained weight. In October 2012, Jones was named to the U.S. national bobsled team. Jones was one of three track and field Olympians (along with Tianna Madison and Hyleas Fountain) invited to the U.S. women's bobsled push championship by coach Todd Hays. Jones and Madison made the bobsled team, giving them a chance to earn a spot on the bobsled World Cup circuit. On November 9, 2012, Jones and teammate Jazmine Fenlator placed second in Jones' first career World Cup bobsledding competition.

=== 2014 Winter Olympics ===
On January 27, 2013, Jones won gold in the team event with the U.S. at the FIBT World Championships in St. Moritz. She was selected for the U.S. bobsled team to compete at the 2014 Sochi Olympics on January 19, 2014, as the brakewoman for the USA Team-3 sled. Some sports journalists argued that bobsledder Katie Eberling was more qualified for the spot, but the USBSF stood by their decision. On February 19, 2014, the team placed tenth, 3.36 seconds behind the gold medal-winning Canadian team.

=== 2021 World Championship ===
Lolo Jones and Kaillie Humphries won the two-woman bobsleigh world championship in February 2021.

== Personal life ==
Jones was named Lori at birth, after her mother, but said she started going by "Lolo" in order to differentiate the two on the telephone. Her mother claims that "Lolo" is what she called her daughter from birth. She has described herself as being of "French, African-American, Native American and Norwegian descent." She is a devout Christian, and often prays before competitions and talks about her faith on Twitter.

A 2005 graduate of Louisiana State University (LSU), Jones resides in Baton Rouge, Louisiana, and is sponsored by Asics and Red Bull. In a 2012 segment on HBO's Real Sports, Jones said that she was a virgin, dated online, and was struggling to maintain her virginity. She said:

If there's virgins out there, I'm going to let them know, it's the hardest thing I've ever done in my life—harder than training for the Olympics, harder than graduating from college, has been to stay a virgin before marriage.

Jones has openly shared her experience with egg freezing.

=== Charitable contributions to Iowa ===
While visiting Des Moines for the Drake Relays, she made a surprise visit to her alma mater, Roosevelt High School, to deliver a pair of new Asics running shoes for each member of the school's track team. She also delivered a $3,000 check to buy indoor practice hurdles and for improvements to repair the school's track surface.

In July 2008, while back in Des Moines for a send-off ceremony before the 2008 Summer Olympics, Jones donated the $4,000 prize from winning the 100-meter hurdles at the Olympic trials to Renee Trout, a single mother from Cedar Rapids, Iowa, who was hit by the Iowa flood of 2008. Asics and Oakley each matched Jones' $4,000 prize, bringing the total donation to $12,000. After the sendoff ceremony, Jones flew with Trout to Cedar Rapids aboard a private jet provided by the Iowa Farm Bureau to tour the neighborhoods affected by the flood, including Trout's.

=== Mental health ===
Jones states she struggles with passive suicidal thoughts and was diagnosed with PTSD following the 2008 Olympics.

== In the media ==
In October 2009, Jones posed nude for The Body Issue of ESPN the Magazine. In 2012, she appeared on the cover of Outside magazine wearing a bathing suit made of strategically placed ribbon.

Jones appeared as a guest on the June 25, 2012, episode of The Tonight Show with Jay Leno.

On August 19, 2013, Jones was announced as a cast member in the 2014 remake of the Left Behind movie series. She portrayed an airport gate attendant.

On September 4, 2014, Jones was announced as one of the celebrities competing on the 19th season of Dancing with the Stars. She paired with professional dancer Keoikantse Motsepe. On September 16, Jones was the first celebrity eliminated.

Jones appeared as a special guest on Whose Line Is It Anyway? on July 13, 2016.

In 2017, Jones joined the cast of MTV's special mini-series The Challenge: Champs vs. Pros. She was eliminated in episode 6, raising $1,000 for her charity Hurdles of Hope.

Jones is the most followed U.S. track and field athlete on Twitter. Her tweets have frequently been the subject of controversy and media coverage. She has stated she greatly dislikes the attention, but tries to consider the potential benefits of social media views.

In January 2019, Jones was one of the twelve houseguests competing on the second season of Celebrity Big Brother. She was evicted in the final episode. In the same year, she hosted the two-part reunion show for The Challenge: War of the Worlds alongside WWE pro wrestler Mike "The Miz" Mizanin.

In 2020, Jones joined the cast of the 36th season of The Challenge. She left the show on her own accord in episode 11, citing frustrations with her performance in the competition and to prepare for the Olympic Games. Jones disputed the portrayal of her departure on her social media, claiming production "forced" her to leave.

== Criticism ==
On August 4, 2012, Jones was criticized by Jeré Longman of The New York Times: "This [media attention paid to her] was based not on achievement but on her exotic beauty and on a sad and cynical marketing campaign." Janice Forsyth, director of the International Centre for Olympic Studies at the University of Western Ontario, compared her to tennis' Anna Kournikova, who had never won a WTA Tour singles tournament but became well known after appearing in numerous photo shoots and product advertisements. Jones rejected the criticism, saying that her critics should be supporting the U.S. Olympic athletes, whereas instead they just "ripped me to shreds". Jones also stated that The New York Times did not do its research properly, since, unlike Kournikova, she had won several major races, including two world indoor titles and holding the indoor American record.

The selection of Jones to the U.S. 2014 Winter Olympics bobsled team was criticized by some American bobsledders as happening due to her fame. Curt Tomasevicz said, "It's hard for me to name one or two athletes that would completely agree with that decision." Emily Azevedo, who was competing with Katie Eberling and Jones for a spot on the team, said: "I should have been working harder on gaining Twitter followers than gaining muscle mass." Neither Eberling nor Azevedo blamed Jones for her selection. The United States Bobsled and Skeleton Federation CEO Darrin Steele defended the selection: "I haven't heard anyone making the argument about Lolo not being a better athlete right now, a better brakeman for the team. I don't think I've come across that one time. I've heard a lot about history and all that's nice. But who's going to provide the best results for the U.S. team in Sochi? That's the bottom line. And I'll have that debate with anyone who wants to have it." The team ended up in 11th place. Bobsledder Elana Meyers defended the selection of Jones, saying that "Everyone may not agree with the decision, but the fact of the matter is, the numbers supported the selection committee’s decision."

== Achievements ==
=== Personal bests ===
Event	Time (seconds)	Venue	Date
55-meter hurdles	7.57	Gainesville, Florida	March 2, 2003
60-meter hurdles	7.72	Doha, Qatar	March 13, 2010
100-meter hurdles	12.43	Beijing, China	August 18, 2008
60 meters	7.29	Fayetteville, Arkansas, U.S.	March 14, 2003
100 meters	11.24	Stuttgart, Germany	September 10, 2006

- All information from IAAF Profile

=== Competition record ===
Year	Competition	Venue	Position	Event	Result
Representing the United States
2004	NACAC U-23 Championships	Sherbrooke, Canada	1st	100 m hurdles	13.05 (wind: +0.0 m/s)
2004	NACAC U-23 Championships	Sherbrooke, Canada	2nd	4 × 100 m relay	43.63
2006	World Athletics Final	Stuttgart, Germany	5th	100 m dash	11.24 (wind: -0.2 m/s)
2006	World Athletics Final	Stuttgart, Germany	6th	100 m hurdles	12.76 (wind: +0.6 m/s)
2007	2007 USA Outdoor Track and Field Championships	Indianapolis, USA	3rd	100 m hurdles	12.79
2007	World Championships	Osaka, Japan	6th	100 m hurdles	12.62 (wind: -0.1 m/s)
2008	World Indoor Championships	Valencia, Spain	1st	60 m hurdles	7.80
2008	IAAF Golden League	Weltklasse Zürich, Switzerland	1st	100 m hurdles	12.56
2008	2008 United States Olympic Trials (track and field)	Eugene, Oregon, USA	1st	100 m hurdles	12.29 (wind: +3.8 m/s )
2008	Olympic Games	Beijing, China	7th	100 m hurdles	12.72 (wind: +0.1 m/s)
2008	World Athletics Final	Stuttgart, Germany	1st	100 m hurdles	12.56 (wind: +0.3 m/s)
2010	World Indoor Championships	Doha, Qatar	1st	60 m hurdles	7.72
2010	2010 USA Outdoor Track and Field Championships	Des Moines, Iowa, USA	1st	100 m hurdles	12.69 (wind: -2.1 m/s )
2010	Diamond League	Doha, Qatar	1st	100 m hurdles	12.63
2010	Diamond League	Oslo, Norway	1st	100 m hurdles	12.66
2010	Diamond League	New York, USA	1st	100 m hurdles	12.55
2010	IAAF Continental Cup	Split, Croatia	2nd	100 m hurdles	12.66
2012	2012 United States Olympic Trials (track and field)	Eugene, Oregon, USA	3rd	100 m hurdles	12.86
2012	Olympic Games	London, United Kingdom	4th	100 m hurdles	12.58 (wind: -0.2 m/s)
2014	2014 USA Outdoor Track and Field Championships	Sacramento, California, USA	3rd	100 m hurdles	12.65 (wind: -1.6 m/s)
2015	NACAC Championships	San José, Costa Rica	1st	100 m hurdles	12.63 w (wind: +4.1 m/s)

=== Competition record in Winter Sports ===
Year	Competition	Venue	Position	Event	Result
Representing Team United States
2012	2012–13 Bobsleigh World Cup	Lake Placid	2nd	Two-woman	1:55.33
2013	2012–13 Bobsleigh World Cup	Igls	3rd	Team Competition	3:37.34
2013	FIBT World Championships 2013	St.Moritz	1st	Two-woman	1:07.76
2013	2013–14 Bobsleigh World Cup	Park City	2nd	Two-woman	1:39.24
2014	2013–14 Bobsleigh World Cup	Winterberg	2nd	Two-woman	1:55.42
2014	2014 Winter Olympics	Sliding Center Sanki, Krasnaya Polyana	11th	Two-woman	3:53.97
2016	2016–17 Bobsleigh World Cup	Lake Placid	2nd	Two-woman	1:52.16
2017	2016–17 Bobsleigh World Cup	Igls	1st	Two-woman	1:46.14
2017	2016–17 Bobsleigh World Cup	Pyeongchang	2nd	Two-woman	1:43.80
2017	2017–18 Bobsleigh World Cup	Park City	3rd	Two-woman	1:40.99
2018	2017–18 Bobsleigh World Cup	St. Moritz	1st	Two-woman	2:15.27
2021	2020–21 Bobsleigh World Cup	Igls	1st	Two-woman	1:47.07
2021	2021 IBSF World Championships	Altenberg	1st	Two-woman	3:48.26

== Filmography ==
=== Films ===
Year	Title	Role
2012	Red Bull Kluge	Herself
2014	Left Behind	Lori
2015	Navy Seals vs. Zombies	Margaret

=== Television ===
Year	Title	Role	Notes
2012	The Tonight Show with Jay Leno	Guest	June 25
2014	Dancing with the Stars 19	Contestant	Eliminated; 1 episode
2016	Whose Line is it Anyway?	Guest	July 13
2017	The Challenge: Champs vs. Pros	Contestant	Eliminated; 6 episodes
2019	Celebrity Big Brother 2	Contestant	3rd place
2019	The Challenge: War of the Worlds	Host	Reunion show host
2020–21	The Challenge: Double Agents	Contestant	Withdrew; 11 episodes
2023	Celebrity Name That Tune	Contestant	September 19 (S3 Ep6)
