= Athletics at the 2005 Summer Universiade – Women's 4 × 100 metres relay =

The women's 4 × 100 metres relay event at the 2005 Summer Universiade was held on 20 August in İzmir, Turkey.

== Results ==
| Rank | Nation | Athletes | Time | Notes |
|---|---|---|---|---|
| 1st place, gold medalist(s) | Russia | Yevgeniya Polyakova, Olga Khalandyreva, Yelena Yakovleva, Yuliya Chermoshanskaya | 43.62 | |
| 2nd place, silver medalist(s) | France | Natacha Vouaux, Aurore Kassambara, Céline Thelamon, Adrianna Lamalle | 43.73 | |
| 3rd place, bronze medalist(s) | Ireland | Derval O'Rourke, Anna Boyle, Ailis McSweeney, Emily Maher | 44.69 | |
| 4 | Canada | Martine Cloutier-LeBlanc, Karlyn Serby, Nicole Buchholz, Adrienne Power | 44.78 | |
| 5 | Nigeria | Chinoye Ohadugha, Shola Ogundemi, Judith Ademuwagun, Omolara Omoloye | 46.32 | |
| 6 | Turkey | Esen Kızıldağ, Birsen Engin, Gülay Kırşan-Kılıç, Burcu Şentürk | 46.41 | |
| | South Africa | Cindy Stewart, Ilze Jordaan, Karin Mey, Delia Smith | DQ | |
