= 1996 World Junior Championships in Athletics – Women's 100 metres hurdles =

The women's 100 metres hurdles event at the 1996 World Junior Championships in Athletics was held in Sydney, Australia, at International Athletic Centre on 23, 24 and 25 August.

== Medalists ==
Gold	Joyce Bates; United States
Silver	Glory Alozie; Nigeria
Bronze	Tan Yali; China

== Results ==
=== Final ===
25 August

Rank	Name	Nationality	Time	Notes
1st place, gold medalist(s)	Joyce Bates	United States	13.27	
2nd place, silver medalist(s)	Glory Alozie	Nigeria	13.30	
3rd place, bronze medalist(s)	Tan Yali	China	13.37	
4	Dominque Calloway	United States	13.55	
5	Anna Pettersson	Sweden	13.88	
6	Tasha Danvers	United Kingdom	14.00	
7	Sandra Ingelmo	Spain	14.11	
	Reïna-Flor Okori	France	DQ	IAAF rule 168.7

=== Semifinals ===
24 August

==== Semifinal 1 ====
Rank	Name	Nationality	Time	Notes
1	Joyce Bates	United States	13.47	Q
2	Reïna-Flor Okori	France	13.73	Q
3	Tasha Danvers	United Kingdom	13.88	Q
4	Sandra Ingelmo	Spain	13.89	Q
5	Katia Brito	Cuba	13.97	
6	Nicole Gale	Australia	14.06	
7	Joanna Buciarska	Denmark	14.24	
	Sabine Scheuring	Germany	DNF	

==== Semifinal 2 ====
Rank	Name	Nationality	Time	Notes
1	Dominque Calloway	United States	13.58	Q
2	Glory Alozie	Nigeria	13.68	Q
3	Tan Yali	China	13.79	Q
4	Anna Pettersson	Sweden	14.04	Q
5	Denise Bolton	United Kingdom	14.07	
6	Veronica Dyer	Canada	14.27	
7	Anat Morad	Israel	14.32	
8	Hanna Korell	Finland	14.67	

=== Heats ===
23 August

==== Heat 1 ====
Rank	Name	Nationality	Time	Notes
1	Tasha Danvers	United Kingdom	13.80	Q
2	Sandra Ingelmo	Spain	14.06	Q
3	Katia Brito	Cuba	14.16	Q
4	Anat Morad	Israel	14.32	q
5	Polina Korobova	Russia	14.33	
6	Ahlam Allali	Algeria	14.71	
7	Shanna Sokolova	Tajikistan	15.95	

==== Heat 2 ====
Rank	Name	Nationality	Time	Notes
1	Joyce Bates	United States	13.63	Q
2	Glory Alozie	Nigeria	13.64	Q
3	Hanna Korell	Finland	13.91	Q
4	Veronica Dyer	Canada	14.11	q
5	Celia Medina	Spain	14.60	
	Andrea Markert	Germany	DNF	
	Marilia Gregoriou	Cyprus	DNF	

==== Heat 3 ====
Rank	Name	Nationality	Time	Notes
1	Tan Yali	China	13.91	Q
2	Denise Bolton	United Kingdom	13.99	Q
3	Nicole Gale	Australia	14.15	Q
4	Reïna-Flor Okori	France	14.31	q
5	Jaana Kalliojärvi	Finland	14.42	
6	Aryiró Tsoka	Greece	14.84	
	Grainne Redmond	Ireland	DNF	

==== Heat 4 ====
Rank	Name	Nationality	Time	Notes
1	Dominque Calloway	United States	13.55	Q
2	Sabine Scheuring	Germany	13.82	Q
3	Anna Pettersson	Sweden	14.16	Q
4	Joanna Buciarska	Denmark	14.28	q
5	Akiko Morimoto	Japan	14.36	
6	Dragana Ciganovic	Croatia	14.56	
7	Simone Purvis	Australia	35.09	
	Anila Meta	Albania	DNF	

== Participation ==
According to an unofficial count, 29 athletes from 23 countries participated in the event.

- Albania (1)
- Algeria (1)
- Australia (2)
- Canada (1)
- China (1)
- Croatia (1)
- Cuba (1)
- Cyprus (1)
- Denmark (1)
- Finland (2)
- France (1)
- Germany (2)
- Greece (1)
- Ireland (1)
- Israel (1)
- Japan (1)
- Nigeria (1)
- Russia (1)
- Spain (2)
- Sweden (1)
- Tajikistan (1)
- United Kingdom (2)
- United States (2)
