= Micol Cattaneo =

Italian athlete (born 1982)

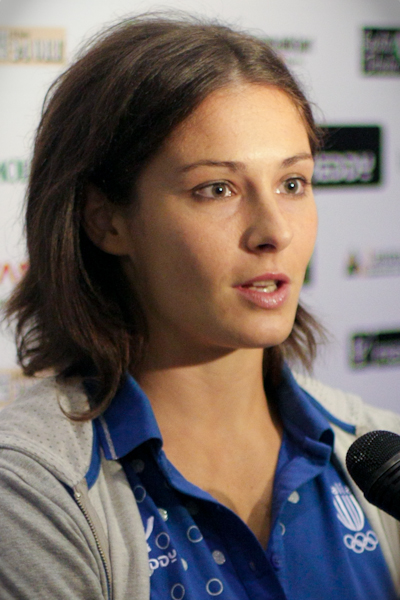

Personal information
- Nationality: Italian
- Born: 13 May 1982 (age 44) Como, Italy
- Height: 1.78 m (5 ft 10 in)
- Weight: 62 kg (137 lb)

Sport
- Country: Italy
- Sport: Athletics
- Event: 100 metres hurdles
- Club: C.S. Carabinieri
- Coached by: Flavio Alberio

Achievements and titles
- Personal bests: 100 m hs: 12.98 (2008); 60 m hs: 8.02 (2008)
Medal record
Event	1st	2nd	3rd
Mediterranean Games	1	0	1
Military World Games	1	1	0

Micol Cattaneo (born 13 May 1982) is an Italian athlete who competes mainly in the 100 metres hurdles. She represented Italy at the 2008 Olympic Games in Beijing, China. In the season 2018–2019 she also competed as bobsledder.

== Biography ==
Cattaneo was born in Como, Italy. In the 100 metres hurdles, she won a silver medal at the 2007 Military World Games and a bronze medal at the 2009 Mediterranean Games. In the 4 × 100 metres relay, she won gold medals at the 2007 Military World Games and the 2013 Mediterranean Games.

Her personal best time of 12.98s was set on 22 June 2008 in Annecy, France. Later that year she competed at the Olympic Games in Beijing, where she was eliminated in the heats, running 13.13s.

She is the daughter of the former Italian football player Giuseppe Cattaneo. She has 17 international appearances for the Italian national team from 2003 to 2012.

== Achievements ==
Year	Competition	Venue	Position	Event	Notes
Representing Italy
2000	World Junior Championships	Santiago, Chile	25th (h)	100m hurdles	13.97 (wind: +0.1 m/s)
2003	European U23 Championships	Bydgoszcz, Poland	22nd (h)	100m hurdles	13.83 (wind: 1.2 m/s)
2003	European U23 Championships	Bydgoszcz, Poland	5th	4 × 100 m relay	44.82
2005	European Indoor Championships	(Spain) Madrid	SF	60 metres hurdles	8.30
2005	European Cup	(Italy) Florence	5th	100 metres hurdles	13.34
2006	European Championships	(Sweden) Gothenburg	SF	100 metres hurdles	13.38
2007	Military World Games	(India) Hyderabad	2nd	100 metres hurdles	13.36
2007	Military World Games	(India) Hyderabad	1st	4 × 100 metres relay	44.97
2008	World Indoor Championships	(Spain) Valencia	SF	60 metres hurdles	8.10
2008	European Cup	(France) Annecy	5th	100 metres hurdles	12.98
2008	Olympic Games	(China) Beijing	Heat	100 metres hurdles	13.13
2009	European Indoor Championships	(Italy) Turin	SF	60 metres hurdles	8.21
2009	Mediterranean Games	(Italy) Pescara	3rd	100 metres hurdles	13.39
2012	European Championships	(Finland) Helsinki	8th	100 metres hurdles	13.16
2013	Mediterranean Games	(Turkey) Mersin	1st	4 × 100 m relay	44.66

== National titles ==
Cattaneo has won 9 senior national championship titles.

- 5 wins Italian 100 metres hurdles Champion (2005, 2007, 2008, 2009, 2017)
- 4 wins Italian Indoor 60 metres hurdles Champion (2005, 2007, 2008, 2009)

== See also ==
- Italian all-time lists – 100 metres hurdles
- Italy at the Military World Games
- Italy national relay team
