= Margaret Macchiut =

Italian hurdler

Personal information
- Born: 14 July 1974 (age 51) Nova Gorica, Slovenia
- Height: 1.71 m (5 ft 7 in)
- Weight: 57 kg (126 lb)

Sport
- Sport: Track and field
- Event: 100 metres hurdles
- Club: Fondiaria SAI Atletica
- Coached by: Adriano Lassich

Margaret Macchiut (born 14 July 1974) is a retired Italian athlete who specialised in the 100 metres hurdles. She won the bronze medal at the 2001 Mediterranean Games.

== Biography ==
Her personal bests are 13.03 seconds in the 100 metres hurdles (+1.6 m/s, Valencia 2006) and 8.14 seconds in the 60 metres hurdles (Ancona 2005).

She is married to a former footballer, Alessandro Teodorani.

== Competition record ==
Year	Competition	Venue	Position	Event	Notes
Representing Italy
1993	European Junior Championships	San Sebastián, Spain	6th (h)	100 m hurdles	13.94 (w)
1997	Mediterranean Games	Bari, Italy	5th	100 m hurdles	13.47
2000	European Indoor Championships	Ghent, Belgium	9th (h)	60 m hurdles	8.22
2001	Mediterranean Games	Radès, Tunisia	3rd	100 m hurdles	13.31
2002	European Indoor Championships	Vienna, Austria	11th (h)	60 m hurdles	8.27
2002	European Championships	Munich, Germany	25th (h)	100 m hurdles	13.48
2005	European Indoor Championships	Madrid, Spain	23rd (h)	60 m hurdles	8.35
2006	European Championships	Gothenburg, Sweden	14th (sf)	100 m hurdles	13.31
