= Esen Kızıldağ =

Turkish hurdler (born 1980)

Esen Kızıldağ (born 30 September 1980) is a retired Turkish hurdler who specialized in the 100 metres hurdles.

She finished sixth at the 2001 Mediterranean Games, seventh at the 2005 Mediterranean Games, and won the 2005 Balkan Indoor Championships. In the 4 × 100 metres relay she finished sixth at the 2005 Universiade and finished last in the heats at the 2006 European Championships.

She competed at the 2001 European U23 Championships, the 2002 European Indoor Championships, the 2005 Universiade, the 2006 European Championships, the 2007 European Indoor Championships, the 2007 Universiade, the 2007 World Championships, the 2008 World Indoor Championships, and the 2009 European Indoor Championships without reaching the final.

Kızıldağ became Turkish champion several times, including one title in the 100 metres in 2001.

At the 2013 Turkish championships, she tested positive for doping, and was suspended between June 2013 and June 2015.

Her personal best time was 12.99 seconds, achieved in July 2006 in Helsinki. In the 60 metres hurdles she had 8.19 seconds from February 2007 in Ghent and Piraeus.
