= Irina Shevchenko =

Russian hurdler

Personal information
- Born: 2 September 1975 (age 51) Frunze, Kyrgyz SSR, Soviet Union

Sport
- Sport: Track and field
Medal record
Representing Russia
European Championships
Bronze medal – third place	1998 Budapest	100 m hurdles
European U23 Championships
Gold medal – first place	1997 Turku	100 m hurdles
Silver medal – second place	1997 Turku	4x100 m relay
Summer Universiade
Silver medal – second place	1997 Catania	4x100 m relay

Irina Shevchenko, née Korotya (Russian: Ирина Шевченко; born 2 September 1975) is a Russian hurdler.

Her personal best time is 12.67 seconds, achieved in July 2004 in Tula. She equalled this time in the 2004 Olympic semi final. Reaching the hurdles final at the 2004 Olympic Games, she fell after Perdita Felicien stumbled into her.

She did not compete during the 2000, 2002 or 2006 seasons.

She is coached by Valentin Maslakov and her husband Dmitriy Shevchenko.

== International competitions ==
Representing Russia
Year	Competition	Venue	Position	Event	Time	Notes
1997	Universiade	Catania, Italy	4th	100 m hurdles	13.29	
1997	European U23 Championships	Turku, Finland	1st	100 m hurdles	12.97	wind: +1.9 m/s
1997	European U23 Championships	Turku, Finland	2nd	4 × 100 m relay	44.41	
1998	European Championships	Budapest, Hungary	3rd	100 m hurdles	12.85	
1998	World Cup	Johannesburg, South Africa	3rd	100 m hurdles	12.77	
1999	World Indoor Championships	Maebashi, Japan	8th	60 m hurdles	8.09	
2005	European Indoor Championships	Madrid, Spain	5th	60 m hurdles	8.02	
2005	World Championships	Helsinki, Finland	7th	100 m hurdles	12.97	
2007	European Indoor Championships	Birmingham, United Kingdom	4th	60 m hurdles	8.01	

== See also ==
- List of European Athletics Championships medalists (women)
- List of Olympic Games scandals and controversies
