= LaTasha Colander =

American track and field sprinter

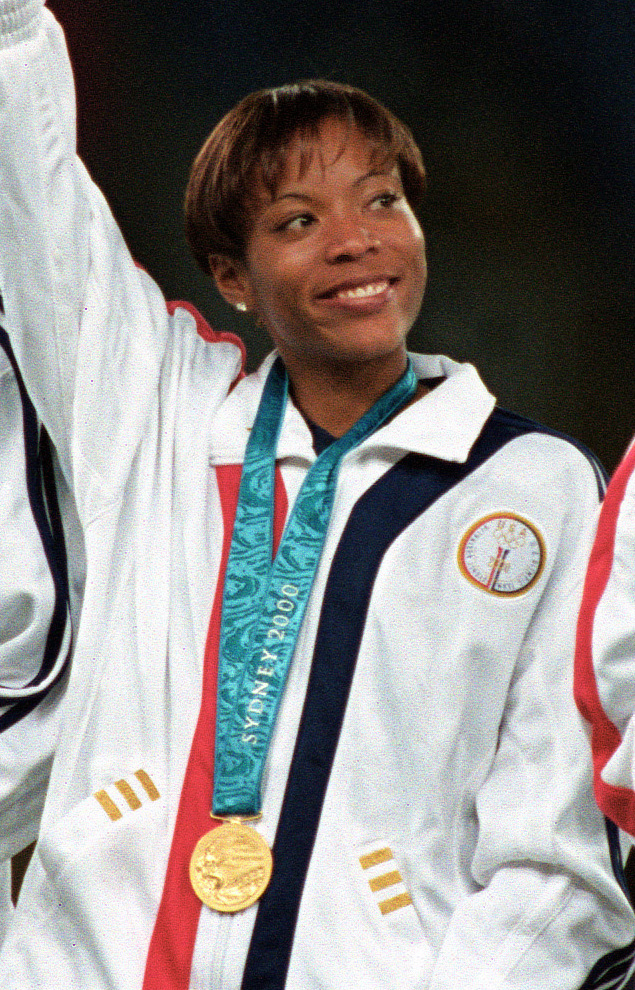
- LaTasha Colander, Sydney 2000

Personal information
- Born: August 23, 1976 (age 49) Portsmouth, Virginia, U.S.
- Height: 5 ft 5 in (165 cm)
- Weight: 130 lb (59 kg)
Medal record
Women's athletics
Representing the United States
Olympic Games
Gold medal – first place	2000 Sydney	4 × 400 m Relay

LaTasha Colander (born August 23, 1976, in Portsmouth, Virginia) is a retired track and field sprinter who competed internationally for the United States. In 1994, on athletic scholarship, Colander enrolled at, and later graduated from, the University of North Carolina at Chapel Hill.

In 1994, in the 100 m hurdles, Colander was the USA Juniors champion, and placed second in the World Junior Champs. Yet soon, she switched to sprints. In 2000 and 2001, she was the U.S. champion in the 400 m. In April 2000, her team set the women's world record in the 4 × 200 m relay, a record standing over 15 years onward.

In the 2000 Olympics, Colander won a gold medal in the 4 × 400 m relay. Upon her teammate Marion Jones's 2007 admission of illegal doping, the International Olympic Committee stripped the whole team's medals; in 2010, however, by a successful appeal, all team members except Jones had their medals restored.

Colander missed the 2001 World Championships because of a quadriceps injury. In 2003, she switched concentration to the 100 m, and won the 2004 US Olympic Trials in this shorter event. At the 2005 World Championships, she placed fifth in the 200 meters.

In 2000, Colander had established the LC Treasures Within Foundation, its mission to strengthen kids, families, and the world through education, sports, and spirituality.

In 2014, Colander was inducted into the Virginia Sports Hall of Fame.

== Achievements ==
Year	Competition	Venue	Position	Event	Notes
Representing the United States
1994	World Junior Championships	Lisbon, Portugal	2nd	100m hurdles	13.30 (wind: +0.5 m/s)
1994	World Junior Championships	Lisbon, Portugal	—	4 × 100 m relay	DQ
2000	Olympic Games	Sydney, Australia	quarter-finals	400 m	52.07
2000	Olympic Games	Sydney, Australia	1st	4 × 400 m	3:22.62
2004	Olympic Games	Athens, Greece	8th	100 m	11.18
2004	Olympic Games	Athens, Greece	—	4 × 100 m	DNF
2005	World Championships	Helsinki, Finland	5th	200 m	22.66
