= Miriam Bobková =

Slovak hurdler

Personal information
- Full name: Miriam Bobková-Cupáková
- Nationality: Slovakia
- Born: 2 March 1979 (age 47) Spišská Nová Ves, Czechoslovakia
- Height: 1.70 m (5 ft 7 in)
- Weight: 58 kg (128 lb)

Sport
- Sport: Athletics
- Event: 100 metres hurdles
- Club: AK Spartak Dubnica
- Coached by: Eugen Laczo

Achievements and titles
- Personal bests: 100 m hurdles: 13.04 s (2007); 60 m hurdles: 8.04 s (2008)
Medal record
Women's athletics
Representing Slovakia
European Youth Summer Olympic Festival
Gold medal – first place	1995 Bath	100m Hurdles

Miriam Bobková-Cupáková (born 2 March 1979) is a Slovak retired sprint hurdler. She competed in the women's 100 m hurdles at the 2008 Summer Olympics. She also took part in the 2007 IAAF World Championships. Bobková competed in the women's 60 m hurdles in major indoor competitions including the 2008 IAAF World Indoor Championships, as well as the European Athletics Indoor Championships in 2005 and 2009.

== Career ==
Bobková was among seven athletes in the Slovak delegation to the 2005 European Athletics Indoor Championships, sent to take part in the women's 60 metres hurdles, having set a personal best time of 8.28 seconds in the event earlier that year.

At the 2007 IAAF World Championships in Osaka, Japan, Bobková set both a national record and a personal best time of 13.04 seconds, by finishing seventh in the preliminary heats of the women's 100 hurdles.

In January 2008, Bobková set a new national record in the 60 metres hurdles, winning the B-final with a time of 8.15 seconds in Linz, Austria, and qualifying for the World Indoor Championships to be held later in the year. Following the meeting in Linz, she improved on her time three times in quick succession, setting new national records with a times of 8.13 and then 8.08 seconds in the French town of Eaubonne, both on 8 February, followed by running 8.04 seconds in Karlsruhe, Germany on 10 February. In March she took part in the 2008 IAAF World Indoor Championships in Valencia, Spain, where she advanced to the semi-finals after recording a time of 8.08 seconds in the women's 60 metres hurdles.

Bobková represented Slovakia at the 2008 Summer Olympics in Beijing, where she competed in the women's 100 m hurdles. She ran in the first heat against seven other competitors, including Turkey's Nevin Yanıt and Poland's Aurelia Trywiańska-Kollasch. She finished the race in last place by twenty-six hundredths of a second (0.26) behind Belarus' Katsiaryna Paplauskaya, with a time of 13.65 seconds. Bobková, however, failed to advance into the semi-finals, as she placed thirty-seventh overall, and was ranked farther below two mandatory slots for the next round.

In 2009, Bobková participated in the European Athletics Indoor Championships in Turin. She ran in the second heat of the women's 60 metres hurdles but she was disqualified for a false start, concluding her participation in the event.
