= Flora Redoumi =

Greek hurdler

Flora Redoumi (Greek: Φλώρα Ρεντούμη; born 11 September 1976) is a Greek hurdler and she was born in Athens.

She finished fifth at the 2002 European Indoor Championships, seventh at the 2004 IAAF World Indoor Championships and seventh at the 2006 IAAF World Cup.

Her personal best time is 12,86 seconds, which ranks her second among Greek 100 m hurdlers of all time, only behind Paraskevi Patoulidou (12.64).

== Competition record ==
Year	Competition	Venue	Position	Event	Notes
Representing Greece
2001	World Indoor Championships	Lisbon, Portugal	17th (h)	60 m hurdles	8.29
2001	Mediterranean Games	Radès, Tunisia	5th	100 m hurdles	13.41
2002	European Indoor Championships	Vienna, Austria	5th	60 m hurdles	8.02
2002	European Championships	Munich, Germany	20th (h)	100 m hurdles	13.42
2003	World Indoor Championships	Birmingham, United Kingdom	9th (sf)	60 m hurdles	8.12
2003	World Championships	Paris, France	18th (sf)	100 m hurdles	13.10
2004	World Indoor Championships	Budapest, Hungary	7th	60 m hurdles	7.94
2004	Olympic Games	Athens, Greece	22nd (h)	100 m hurdles	13.14
2005	European Indoor Championships	Madrid, Spain	10th (sf)	60 m hurdles	8.10
2005	Mediterranean Games	Almería, Spain	3rd	100 m hurdles	13.16
2005	Mediterranean Games	Almería, Spain	4th	4 × 100 m relay	45.33
2005	World Championships	Helsinki, Finland	28th (h)	100 m hurdles	13.65
2006	European Championships	Gothenburg, Sweden	11th (sf)	100 m hurdles	13.15
2007	European Indoor Championships	Birmingham, United Kingdom	–	60 m hurdles	DQ
2007	World Championships	Osaka, Japan	13th (sf)	100 m hurdles	12.88
2008	World Indoor Championships	Valencia, Spain	–	60 m hurdles	DNF
2008	Olympic Games	Beijing, China	35th (h)	100 m hurdles	13.56

== Personal bests ==
Date	Event	Venue	Time
12 June 2004	100 m hurdles	Athens, Greece	12.86
7 March 2004	60 m hurdles	Budapest, Hungary	7.91 (NR)
