= Perdita Felicien =

Canadian hurdler

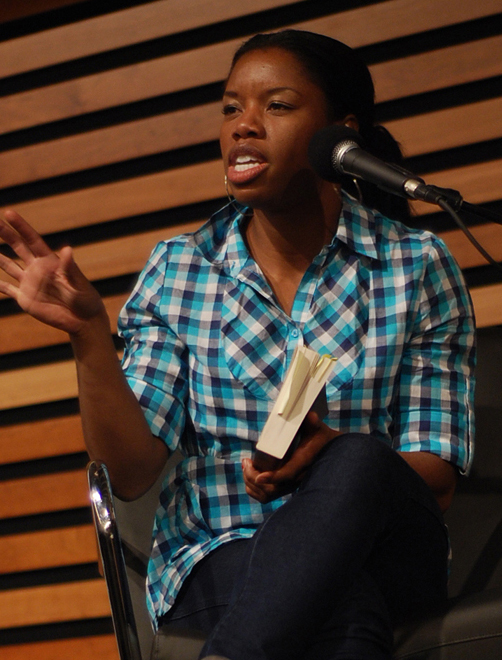

Personal information
- Nationality: Canadian
- Born: 29 August 1980 (age 46) Oshawa, Ontario
- Height: 5 ft 5 in (1.65 m)
- Weight: 140 lb (64 kg)

Sport
- Sport: 100 m hurdles
- Turned pro: 2003
- Retired: October 24, 2013

Achievements and titles
- Personal bests: 100 m hurdles: 12.46 NR, Eugene, 2004
Medal record
Women's athletics
Representing Canada
World Championships
Gold medal – first place	2003 Paris	100 m hurdles
Silver medal – second place	2007 Osaka	100 m hurdles
World Indoor Championships
Gold medal – first place	2004 Budapest	60 m hurdles
Silver medal – second place	2010 Doha	60 m hurdles
Continental Cup.
Bronze medal – third place	2010 Split	100 m hurdles
Pan American Games
Silver medal – second place	2003 Santo Domingo	100 m hurdles
Silver medal – second place	2007 Rio de Janeiro	100 m hurdles
- Updated on July 2012

Perdita Felicien (born August 29, 1980) is a Canadian retired hurdler. Felicien is the 2003 World champion in the 100 metres hurdles and 2004 World indoor champion in the 60 metres hurdles. She also won silver medals at the 2007 World Championships, the 2010 World Indoor Championships, and twice at the Pan American Games. Her best time for the 100 metres hurdles of 12.46 secs from 2004 still stands as the Canadian record.

== Early life ==
Born in Oshawa, Ontario, Felicien carries her mother's maiden name, whose origins are in the Caribbean island nation of Saint Lucia. Her mother named her "Perdita" after she heard the name on the TV game show, The Price is Right.

Felicien moved to Pickering, Ontario, where, as a student, she began competing in track and field events at her school. She was motivated to join the school's track and field team after receiving an Award of Excellence in the Canada Fitness Award Program in grade 3. At first, she competed in the 100 m dash, inspired by Donovan Bailey and Bruny Surin of Canada, later adding the 200 m dash and long jump. Felicien dedicated herself to hurdling at Pine Ridge Secondary School and won the Ontario high-school hurdling championship in 1998. That year she added the first of two consecutive Canadian junior championships. Her performance at a scholastic meet in Ohio brought offers of athletic scholarships from a number of U.S. universities, from which she chose the University of Illinois at Urbana-Champaign, where she enrolled in the study of kinesiology.

== Career ==
Coached by Gary Winckler, in her first year competing at the university level, Felicien earned All-American honors and in the 100 m hurdles set the record for the fastest time by a freshman in NCAA history for the event. The following year she was ranked No. 1 in the 100 m hurdles by the NCAA for the entire outdoor season, and was the first Illinois athlete ever to win a national championship during both the indoor and outdoor seasons. Her performance earned her the first of three consecutive University of Illinois Female Athlete of the Year awards, and she was voted the U.S. Track Coaches Association National Female Outdoor Athlete of the Year.

An undefeated Felicien won her second consecutive 100 m hurdles national title in 2003. She became the first University of Illinois female athlete to be named the Big Ten Conference "Athlete of the Year", and also earned NCAA Female Track & Field Athlete of the Year honors. Felicien blossomed into a major force on the international hurdling scene, topping off her season by winning the women's 100 m Hurdles Final at the 2003 World Championships in Athletics in Paris, France. With that win, Felicien became Canada's first ever female world gold medallist and the first female in Illinois track & field history to win a gold medal in an individual event at the World Championships. She was named Canada's female athlete of the year – the first track athlete to capture that honor in 25 years.

A much-anticipated showdown with hurdling great Gail Devers took place in March 2004. Felicien set a new record in defeating the three-time hurdles world champion in the 60 m hurdle final at the 2004 IAAF World Indoor Championships in Budapest, Hungary. She chalked up six straight wins leading up to the Summer Olympics in Athens, Greece, where she was expected to win gold in the 100 m hurdles on August 24, especially after Devers pulled out with an injury. Unexpectedly, in the event final, Felicien failed to clear the first hurdle and fell into the adjacent lane, knocking down the Russian competitor, Irina Shevchenko, and taking her out of the race and a chance at an Olympic medal, much to the obvious dismay of Shevchenko.

Felicien returned to the track and had some success, winning medals at the world championships alongside her teammate Priscilla Lopes-Schliep. In 2007, she won a silver medal at the world championships in the 100 metre hurdles.

Felicien did not compete in the 2008 Summer Olympics in Beijing, China due to a foot injury. In August 2008, she was a guest commentator for CBC Television's 2008 Olympics coverage of hurdles.

During the summer of 2011, Felicien relocated to the University of Calgary in Alberta to train under the tutelage of former national team head coach, Les Gramantik, and her old coach, Gary Winckler. She also partnered with Jessica Zelinka, ranked the sixth-best heptathlete in the world. In June 2012, Felicien failed to qualify for the Canadian Olympic team for the 2012 London Olympics. She had finished third in the 2012 Canadian Olympic trials for track and field, in the 100 m hurdles event, under protest. However, she false started, and was disqualified.

Felicien retired from competition in 2013. She went back to school to study journalism, and was a writer/reporter with CHCH News in Hamilton, Ontario. She was part of the broadcasting team for the Toronto 2015 PanAm Games coverage. In 2018, Felicien joined the CBC TV network broadcasting the Winter Olympics in Pyeongchang in South Korea and later the Tokyo Olympics (2021).

Since 2020, Felicien has been the host of All-Round Champion, a TV series produced by Marblemedia for TV Ontario and BYU TV.

== Charity ==
Felicien is a supporter of Count Me In, the largest youth-run organization in Canada. She spoke at the 2013 Count Me In Conference in Toronto.

She is also an active ambassador for Right To Play.

== Track & field accomplishments ==
2011

- Harry Jerome International Track Classic Winner the 100 metre hurdles in 12:79 secs.
- Canadian National Champion (10th Title)

2010

- World Indoor Silver Medalist
- 60 m hurdles 7.86
- Drake Relays Hall of Fame Inductee
- Continental Cup Bronze Medalist

2009

- Canadian National Champion
- World Championship Finalist

2008

- Injured

2007

- 2007 IAAF World Championships Silver Medalist 100 m hurdles - 12.49
- Pan Am Games Silver Medalist
- Canadian Track and Field Athlete of the Year
- 2007 Ontario Female Athlete of the Year

2005

- Canadian National Champion
- World Championship Semi-Finalist

2004

- World Indoor Champion in the 60 m hurdles
- Olympic Finalist
- Canadian National Champion
- City of Pickering Civic Award
- Canadian Track and Field Athlete of the Year

2003

- IAAF World Championships World Champion in the 100 m hurdles
- Big Ten Champion in the 60 m and 100 m hurdles
- Drake Relays Most Outstanding Athlete
- Canadian Female Athlete of the Year
- Canadian Track and Field Athlete of the Year
- Canadian National Champion
- Pan Am Games Silver Medalist
- University of Illinois Athlete of the Year
- Big Ten Conference Athlete of the Year

2002

- NCAA Champion in the 100 m hurdles
- University of Illinois Female Athlete of the Year
- Drake Relays Most Outstanding Athlete
- NCAA Record holder in the 60 m hurdles, 7.90 seconds
- NCAA Champion in the 60 m hurdles
- Big Ten Champion in the 60 m hurdles
- All-American in the 60 m hurdles
- Canadian National Champion
- University of Illinois Female Athlete of the Year

2001

- All-American in the 100 m hurdles
- All-American in the 60 m hurdles
- USTCA National Female Athlete of the Year
- Big Ten Female Outdoor Athlete of the Year
- University of Illinois Female Athlete of the Year
- Big Ten Indoor Freshman of the Year
- World Track and Field Championship Semifinalist
- Francophone Games Champion
- University of Illinois Female Athlete of the Year

2000

- Olympian
- Big Ten Outdoor Freshman of the Year
- All-American in the 100 m hurdles
- Canadian National Champion

1999

- Canadian Junior Champion 100 m h

1998

- Canadian Junior Champion 100 m h
- OFSAA 100 m h Record Holder - 13.41
- 1998 OFSAA Champion 100 m h
- 1998 OFSAA Silver 100 m
- 1998 OFSAA Champion 200 m - 24.67

1997 OFSAA Silver Medalist 100 m

== Awards and nominations ==
Year	Organisation	Category	Project	Result	Ref.
2025	Children's and Family Emmy Awards	Outstanding Children's Personality	All-Round Champion	Nominated	
