= Aurelia Trywiańska =

Polish hurdler

Aurelia Trywiańska-Kollasch (born 9 May 1976 in Szczecin) is a former Polish athlete specializing in the 100 meters hurdles. She finished fifth at the 2003 World Championships, the 2006 European Championships and the 2006 World Cup. She also competed in the 2004 Olympics, but did not progress from her heat. In 60 metres hurdles she finished seventh at the 2007 European Indoor Championships.

Her personal best time is 12.73 seconds, achieved in July 2003 in Zagreb.

== Competition record ==
Year	Competition	Venue	Position	Event	Notes
Representing Poland
1994	World Junior Championships	Lisbon, Portugal	22nd (h)	100 m hurdles	14.10 w (wind: +2.2 m/s)
1995	European Junior Championships	Nyíregyháza, Hungary	8th (h)	100 m hurdles	14.17
1995	European Junior Championships	Nyíregyháza, Hungary	3rd	4 × 100 m relay	45.56
1997	European U23 Championships	Turku, Finland	4th	100 m hurdles	13.50 (wind: +1.9 m/s)
2002	European Championships	Munich, Germany	12th (sf)	100 m hurdles	13.08
2003	World Championships	Paris, France	5th	100 m hurdles	12.75
2004	Olympic Games	Athens, Greece	17th (h)	100 m hurdles	13.01
2005	World Championships	Helsinki, Finland	18th (sf)	100 m hurdles	13.11
2006	World Indoor Championships	Moscow, Russia	9th (sf)	60 m hurdles	7.97
2006	European Championships	Gothenburg, Sweden	5th	100 m hurdles	12.90
2007	European Indoor Championships	Birmingham, United Kingdom	7th	60 m hurdles	8.25
2007	World Championships	Osaka, Japan	23rd (h)	100 m hurdles	13.05
2008	Olympic Games	Beijing, China	11th (sf)	100 m hurdles	12.96
