= Sara McGreavy-Wills =

British athlete

Sara McGreavy-Wills (née McGreavy; born 13 December 1982 in Leamington Spa) is an English and UK former international track and field athlete. Educated at North Leamington Community School and Arts College she excelled at cross-country. After joining the Leamington Cycling and Athletics Club she became interested in 100m hurdles. She won five times at The English Schools Championships over this distance. Sarah also runs 60m hurdles indoors.

It was however during her time at the University of Bath and Loughborough University, where she gained a duel degree in Geography and Sport & Leisure Management, that she developed into a world-class athlete. At Bath she was coached by Colin Jackson's former coach Malcolm Arnold. She was later coached by the well known Graham Knight and still occasionally trains at Leamington Athletics Club. She works part-time at a local golf course and lives in Lillington.

Sara currently runs for the Sale Harriers athletics club. She was ranked 4th in the UK for 2006 and 23rd best ever in the 100m hurdles. For the 2005/2006 indoor season she was ranked 3rd in the UK in 60m hurdles, and on 27 January 2007 she became one of the British Top 10 fastest women over that distance ever. On 10 February 2007 she improved on this at the UK Championships and won the 60m hurdles in a time of 8.03s. Not only did this make her number 1 in Britain in 2007 but also the 4th fastest of all time. This meant she qualified for the 2007 European Indoor Championships in Athletics in Birmingham. On 3 March of that year she reached the final and came a creditable 5th with a time of 8.04s. Sara got the 2008 season off to a good start by finishing 2nd in the UK Indoor Championship and followed this up with 2nd in the AAA Championships outdoors.

She retired from elite competition in 2012 and club athletics in 2016.

== International competitions ==
- 2006 European Championships in Athletics (August, Gothenburg, Sweden): 7th, Semi-Final 2
- 2007 European Indoor Championships in Athletics (March, Birmingham, UK): 3rd Semi-Final 1; 5th in Final

== National competitions ==
- Amateur Athletic Association Championships 2005 (July, Manchester, UK): 7th
- AAA Indoor Championships 2006 (February, Sheffield, UK): 4th
- AAA Championships 2006 (July, Manchester, UK): 2nd
- UK Challenge Final 2006 (August, Manchester, UK): 1st
- AAA Indoor Championships 2007 (February, Sheffield, UK): 1st
- AAA Indoor Championships 2008 (February, Sheffield, UK): 2nd
- AAA Championships 2008 (July, Birmingham, UK): 2nd

== Personal bests ==
- 60 m: 7.75 s (2005)
- 100 m: 12.5 s (2006)
- 200 m: 25.8 s (2006)
- 60 m hurdles: 8.03 s (2007)
- 100 m hurdles: 13.20 s (2006)
