= Derval O'Rourke =

Irish hurdler

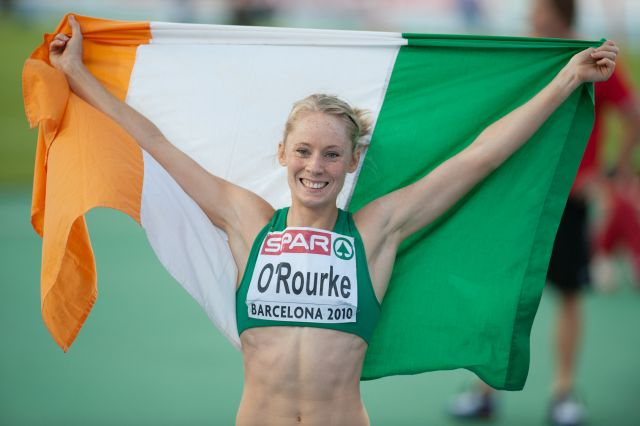
- Derval O'Rourke

Medal record

Representing Ireland

Women's athletics

World Indoor Championships
Gold medal – first place	2006 Moscow	60 m hurdles

European Championships
Silver medal – second place	2006 Gothenburg	100 m hurdles
Silver medal – second place	2010 Barcelona	100 m hurdles

European Indoor Championships
Bronze medal – third place	2009 Turin	60 m hurdles
Bronze medal – third place	2013 Gothenburg	60 m hurdles

Summer Universiade
Bronze medal – third place	2005 Izmir	100 m hurdles
Bronze medal – third place	2005 Izmir	4 × 100 m Relay

European Team Championships
Silver medal – second place	2009 Banska Bystrica	Second League

Derval O'Rourke (born 28 May 1981) is an Irish former sprint hurdles athlete. She competed internationally in the 60 and 100 metres hurdles, and is the Irish national record holder in the former. She participated in two Indoor World Championships, five Outdoor World Championships and the 2004, 2008, and 2012 Summer Olympics.

== Early life and education ==
Born in Cork, O'Rourke attended University College, Dublin (UCD) where she held a sports scholarship between 2000 and 2004. She graduated with a BA (Hons) degree from the college in 2003 and a Diploma in Business Studies from the UCD Michael Smurfit Graduate School of Business in 2005.

== Competition ==
Derval first broke 13 seconds when she finished 4th at the 2003 European Under 23 Athletics Championships in Bydgoszcz, Poland, running a national record of 12.96 seconds, missing out on a medal by just 0.01 seconds. This mark saw her achieve the exact 'A standard' qualification time for the 2004 Olympics.

Also in 2003, she competed at her first World Athletics Championships in Paris before racing at her first Olympic Games in Athens, on both occasions failing to make it past the heats. In 2005 O'Rourke reached the semi-finals of the World Championships in Helsinki. One week later, O'Rourke won the bronze medal in the 100 m Hurdles at the World University Games in Izmir, Turkey in a time of 13.02 seconds. O'Rourke was also part of the Irish 4 × 100 m Relay team that won Bronze.

At the 2006 IAAF World Indoor Championships O'Rourke won the gold medal in the 60 m hurdles, becoming the first Irish woman to win an indoor world athletics championship. On her way to winning she broke the Irish national record twice and her winning time was 7.84 s.

O'Rourke had a successful 2006 outdoor track season after missing the initial part of the season due to injury. In the run up to the European Championships, O'Rourke lowered her Irish national record for the 100 m hurdles twice and had a personal best of 12.85 s before the championships. In the 2006 European Championships in Athletics, O'Rourke finished joint second with Kirsten Bolm and behind Swedish athlete and favourite, Susanna Kallur in a time of 12.72, a new national record. Later in the same championship O'Rourke ran the first leg for the Irish 4 × 100 m relay team which included Joanne Cuddihy, Ailis McSweeney, and Anna Boyle which set a new national record of 44.38 s.

The 2007 season proved less successful for O'Rourke. She did not participate in competition during the indoor season. She did however travel to Osaka, Japan for the World Championships and qualified for the semi-finals but finished eighth. She ended the 2007 season with a best of 12.88 set in Bochum

2008 was also a poor season for O'Rourke. She did not compete at the World Indoor Championships, where she was the defending champion. Lolo Jones went on to win the championships and O'Rourke ended the indoor season with a best of 8.09 set in Peanía. O'Rourke competed for Ireland in the Women's 100-metre hurdles at the 2008 Summer Olympics held in Beijing, China: she failed to qualify from her heat, finishing sixth in a time of 13.22 s.

O'Rourke showed a return to form in 2009, highlighted by her capturing of the bronze medal in the 60 m hurdles at the 2009 European Indoor Championships in Turin, Italy in a time of 7.97 s.

On 18 August 2009, O'Rourke qualified from her 100 m hurdles quarter-final at the World Championships, coming in 2nd place in Heat 3 in a time of 12.86, a season's best. A time of 12.73 when finishing 3rd in her semi-final was good enough to qualify her for the World Championship final as a fastest loser. In the final on 19 August 2009, O'Rourke finished 4th behind winner Brigitte Foster-Hylton, Priscilla Lopes-Schliep and Delloreen Ennis-London, with a time of 12.67 setting a new national record and the fastest time by a European in 2009. She was quoted afterwards as being "gutted not to have won a medal" but "It's a new national record, fourth in the world. I can't really complain."

O'Rourke chose not to compete in the 2010 World Indoor Championships in Athletics due to minor injury.

O'Rourke was one of the favourites for the European title at the European Championships after a seasonal best of 12.71 in the semi-final and, her silver medal attained at the 2006 Championships amongst other chief contenders like Carolin Nytra and Christina Vukicevic. In the final, she won the silver medal once again. O'Rourke set an Irish record of 12.65, cutting .02secs off her previous mark. Turkey's Nevin Yanit won in 12.63, just .02 of a second ahead. O'Rourke said after the race "Medals are very special and, winning a silver medal in a new Irish record, I would take every day of the week, I think when I look back on my career whenever it ends, the only thing that will count is medals because they go into the history books and can't be taken away". O'Rourke has now been the only Irish athlete to win medals at the European Athletics Championships in 2006 and 2010. She was greeted by her fans, the media and the sports minister Mary Hanafin when she landed home on 2 August.

O'Rourke was selected to represent Europe in the 2010 IAAF Continental Cup (Formerly IAAF World Cup) making her the 5th Irish person and second female to be selected to represent Europe after John Treacy (7th in 1979), Eamonn Coghlan (Gold in 1981), John Doherty (Silver in 1991) and Sonia O'Sullivan (5th in 1994, and Gold in 1998). O'Rourke finished 5th in a time of 12.99 seconds. The winner was Sally Pearson in a time of 12.65.

After injury interrupted training O'Rourke competed in the 60 m Hurdles at the 2011 European Athletics Indoor Championships in Paris. She finished 2nd in her heat in 8.07 seconds and then ran a season's best of 7.98 to come 3rd in the semi-final. O'Rourke finished 4th in the final, running another season's best of 7.96.

A the 2011 World Championships in Athletics, O'Rourke finished second in her heat behind eventual champion Sally Pearson of Australia who clocked 12.53. O'Rourke withdrew from her semi-final citing injury. She clocked a seasonal best of 12.84 at La Chaux-de-Fonds.

Heading to her third Olympics in 2012, O'Rourke would at last make the semi-finals where she posted a season's best of 12.91 seconds.

As her career wound down, O'Rourke picked up a fifth major medal - 60 m hurdles bronze at the 2013 European Athletics Indoor Championships in Gothenburg. This medal, however, was not awarded to her until 2015 when initial gold medalist, Nevin Yanit, had her result rescinded following multiple doping violations. This saw O'Rourke's 7.95 seconds finish elevated from fourth to the bronze medal position.

In June 2014 O'Rourke (Leevale AC) announced her retirement from athletics.

== Personal life ==
O'Rourke and her husband, two-time Olympian Peter O'Leary, welcomed their first child, daughter Dafne, in August 2015. Son Archie was then born in April 2019.

== Major competition finals record ==
2013 European Athletics Indoor Championships (Gothenburg)

- Bronze – 60 m Hurdles (7.95 SB)

2011 European Athletics Indoor Championships (Paris)

- 4th place – 60 m Hurdles (7.96 SB)

2010 IAAF Continental Cup (Split)

- 5th place – 100 m Hurdles (12.99)

2010 European Championships (Barcelona)

- Silver – 100 m Hurdles (12.65 NR)

2009 World Championships (Berlin)

- 4th place – 100 m Hurdles (12.67 NR)

2009 European Athletics Indoor Championships (Turin)

- Bronze – 60 m Hurdles (7.97 SB)

2006 European Championships (Gothenburg)

- Silver – 100 m Hurdles (12.72 NR)

2006 World Indoor Championships (Moscow)

- Gold – 60 m Hurdles (7.84 NR)

2005 World University Games (Izmir)

- Bronze – 100 m Hurdles (13.02)

2005 World University Games (Izmir)

- Bronze – 4 × 100 m Relay

2003 European Athletics U23 Championships (Bydgoszcz)

- 4th place – 100 m Hurdles (12.96 NR)

== Personal bests ==
Event	Best (seconds)	Location	Date
50 metre hurdles	6.80	Liévin, France	3 March 2006
60 metres hurdles	7.84	Moscow, Russia	11 March 2006
100 metres	11.54	Santry, Dublin, Ireland	2005
100 metre hurdles	12.65	Barcelona, Spain	31 July 2010

- All information taken from IAAF profile.

=== National records ===
- Outdoor
  - 100 metres hurdles – 12.65 (Barcelona, 31 July 2010)
- Indoor
  - 60 metres hurdles – 7.84 (Moscow, 11 March 2006)

== See also ==
- Ireland at the 2004 Summer Olympics
- Ireland at the 2006 European Championships in Athletics
- Ireland at the 2008 Summer Olympics
