= Susanna Kallur =

Swedish hurdler (born 1981)

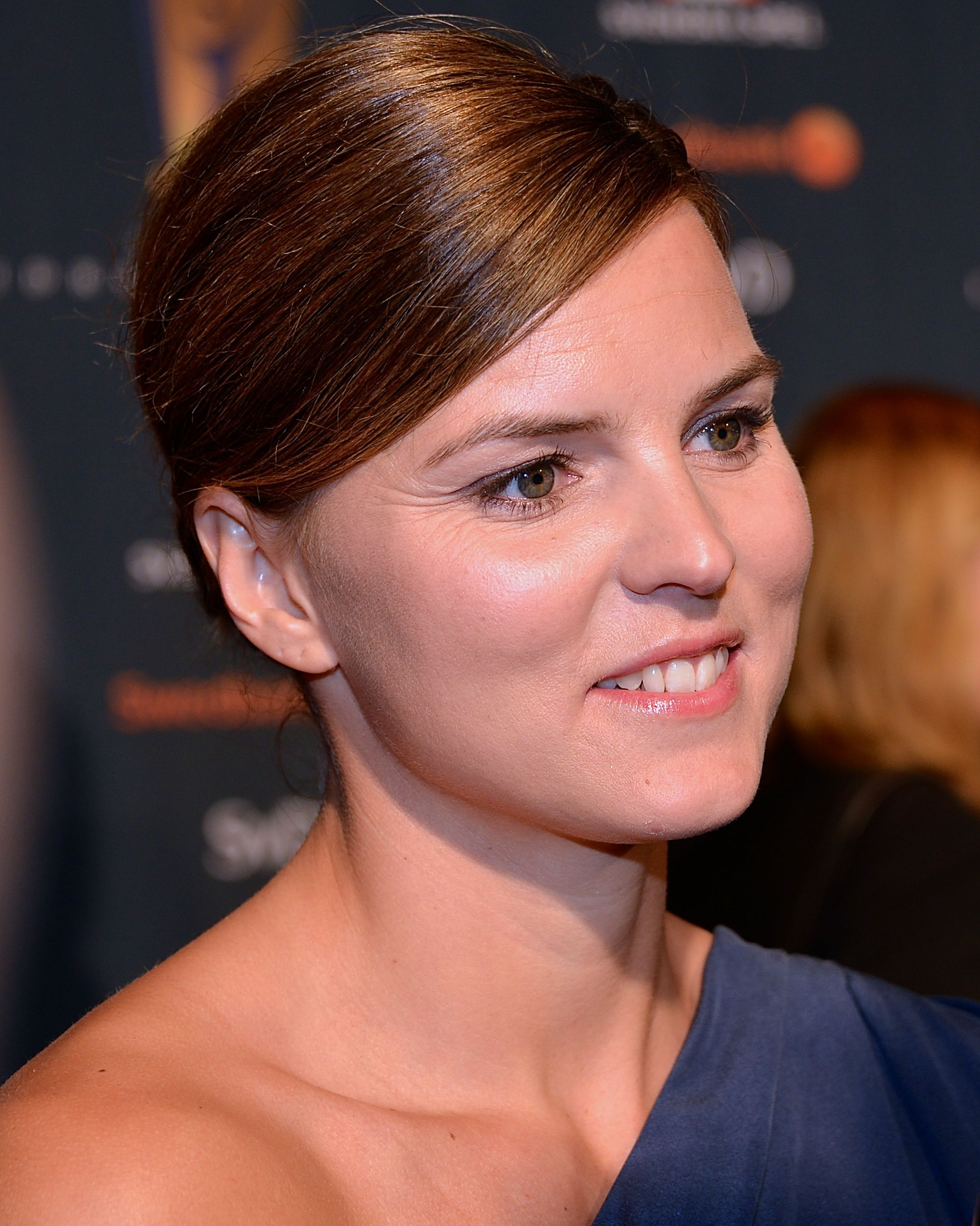
- Kallur in 2013

Personal information
- Born: 16 February 1981 (age 45) Huntington, New York, U.S.

Susanna Kallur
Medal record

Representing Sweden

Women's athletics

World Indoor Championships
Bronze medal – third place	2006 Moscow	60 m hurdles

European Championships
Gold medal – first place	2006 Gothenburg	100 m hurdles

European Indoor Championships
Gold medal – first place	2005 Madrid	60 m hurdles
Gold medal – first place	2007 Birmingham	60 m hurdles

European U23 Championships
Gold medal – first place	2003 Bydgoszcz	100 m hurdles

World Junior Championships
Gold medal – first place	2000 Santiago	100 m hurdles
Bronze medal – third place	1998 Annecy	100 m hurdles
Bronze medal – third place	2000 Santiago	4 × 100 m relay

Susanna Elisabeth "Sanna" Kallur (Swedish pronunciation: [sɵˈsânːa ˈkǎlːɵr]; born 16 February 1981) is a Swedish former athlete competing mainly in sprint hurdles. She has won several international medals, including the gold medal in the 100 m hurdles at the 2006 European Athletics Championships. Kallur previously held the world indoor record for the 60 metres hurdles for 16 years (2008–2024).

== Career ==
Kallur made a breakthrough by winning the 100 m hurdles at the 2000 World Junior Championships held in Santiago, Chile. She then initially failed to make an impact on senior competition, failing to make the final of two World Championships and then the 2004 Olympic Games in Athens, where she improved her personal best to 12.67 seconds.

=== European champion ===
In 2005, she won her first senior gold medal at the European Indoor Championships in Madrid. But once again she failed to reach the final of the 2005 World Championships staged in Helsinki.

She came third in the 2006 World Indoor Championships held in Moscow. That year Kallur, in her biggest achievement to date, claimed the 100 m hurdles title at the European Championships in front of her home crowd in Gothenburg. She won in a time of 12.59 seconds ahead of Kirsten Bolm and Derval O'Rourke.

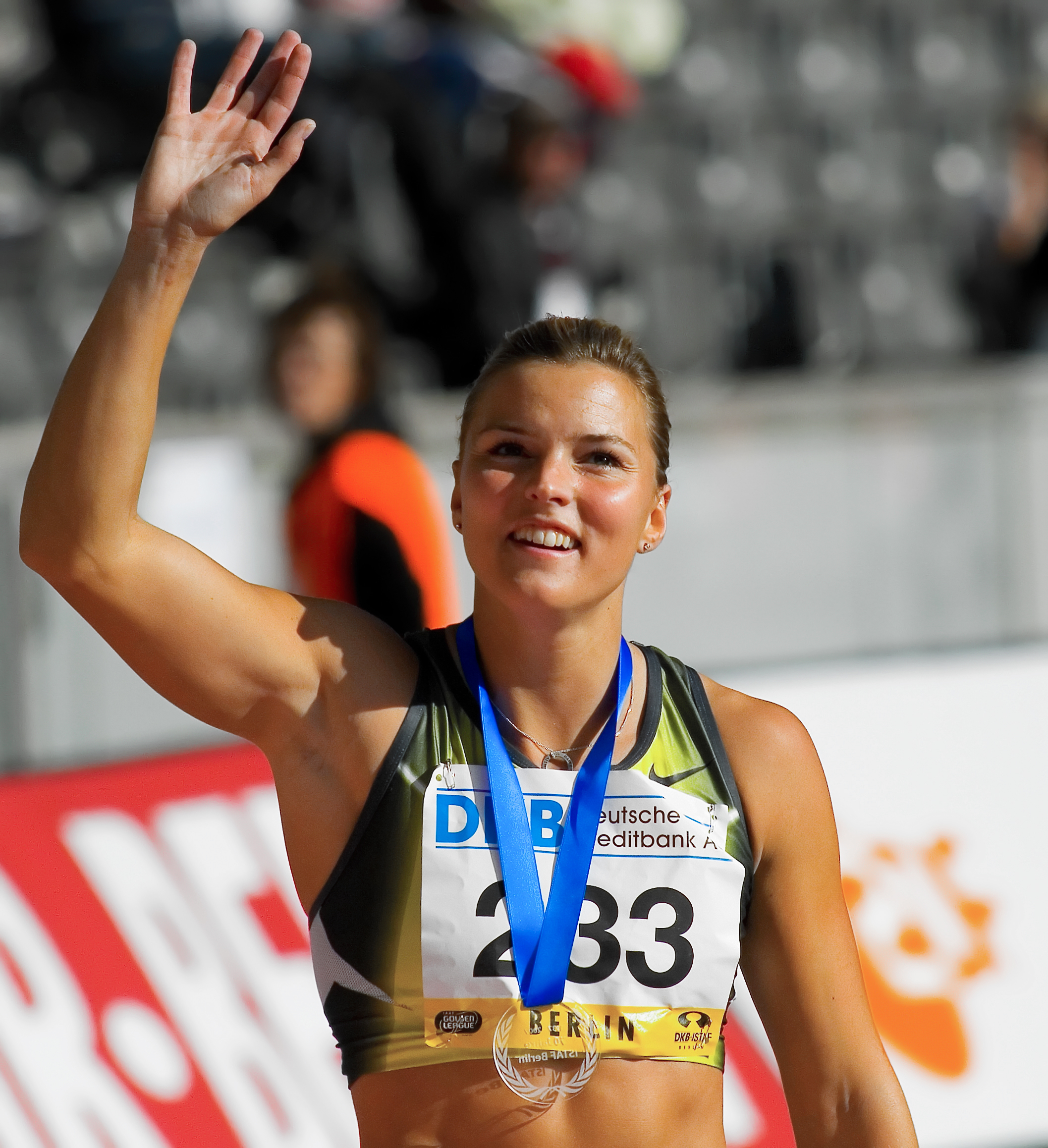
Kallur at the ISTAF Berlin in 2007

Kallur retained her title at the 2007 European Indoor Championships in Birmingham. She finished only fourth in the 100 m hurdles at the 2007 World Championships held in Osaka, despite running a personal best of 12.51 s and having a clear lead to the final hurdle. The Swedish team had grounds for appeal, as eventual winner Michelle Perry had crossed over into Kallur's lane, possibly interfering. But by the time they did register an appeal, the time limit had elapsed. After the World Championships, Kallur won the three remaining Golden League events in Berlin, Zürich and Brussels, posting a personal best in the German capital and beating Perry in all three races.

=== World record and injuries ===
After posting several fast times throughout the beginning of the 2008 indoor season, Kallur broke the 60 m hurdles world indoor record with a time of 7.68 seconds at a meeting in Karlsruhe, Germany on 10 February. She was then the clear favourite for the World Indoor title in Valencia, Spain and won her heat in 7.87 seconds, but did not start the semi-finals, pulling out injured.

She fell at the first hurdle of her semi-final of the 100 m women's hurdles event at the 2008 Olympic Games in Beijing. She missed the entirety of the 2009 season through a stress fracture injury. She had surgery on her shin in late 2008 and, although she had a metal plate removed in June 2009, she declared herself unfit for the 2009 World Championships.

She briefly returned to competition in 2010 running a time of 12.78 s in New York City to finish seventh and coming fourth over 100 m hurdles in the first division of the European Cup. However, she was again sidelined from athletics in 2011. She had hoped to compete at the World Championships but did not recover from injury in time. She resumed training in August at a low-intensity, with the aim of competing in the Olympics in 2012.

In March 2017, she competed in European Indoor Championships held in Belgrade, Serbia. She reached the final in 60 m hurdles and finished eighth with a time of 8.14 seconds as her last match before retirement.

== Personal life ==
Born on 16 February 1981 in Huntington, New York, U.S., Kallur is now a resident of Falun, Sweden, and trains with Falu IK. Her twin sister Jenny Kallur, who is 4 minutes older, is also a 100 m hurdler. They are daughters of the ice hockey player Anders Kallur, who won four Stanley Cup championships with the New York Islanders, and his wife Lisa.

She is 1.70 metres (5 ft 7 in) tall and weighs 61 kilograms (134 lb; 9 st 8 lb). She was coached by Torbjörn Eriksson and also by Karin Torneklint. Often called 'Sanna' in Sweden.

As she was born in the US, Kallur has dual-citizenship. She studied at and competed for University of Illinois at Urbana-Champaign.

In January 2007, she won the Jerring Award, voted by the people of Sweden to be the best sports person or team in Sweden at the time. Number two in the vote was the Swedish national men's ice hockey team, which won Olympic gold and World Championships in 2006.

Susanna and her twin sister Jenny have also done gymnastics and used to be members of the Swedish Junior National Team.

== Competition record ==
- 2005 European Indoor Championships (Madrid)

(60 m hurdles) Gold medal (7.80), making it a double win for the twins.

- 2006 World Indoor Championships (Moscow)

(60 m hurdles) Bronze medal

- 2006 European Championships (Göteborg)

(100 m hurdles) Gold medal

- 2007 European Indoor Championships (Birmingham)

(60 m hurdles) Gold medal

== Personal bests ==
- 60 metres: 7.24 secs (Birmingham, 3 March 2007)
- 60 metres hurdles: 7.68 secs (Karlsruhe, 10 February 2008) World record
- 100 metres: 11.30 secs (Malmö, 22 August 2006)
- 100 metres hurdles: 12.49 secs (Berlin, 16 September 2007)
- 200 metres: 23.32 (Gothenburg, 28 August 2005)

Records
Preceded by (Soviet Union) Ludmila Engquist	Women's 60 m hurdles indoor world record holder 10 February 2008 – 10 February 2024	Succeeded by (The Bahamas) Devynne Charlton (United States) Tia Jones
