= Kirsten Bolm =

German hurdler

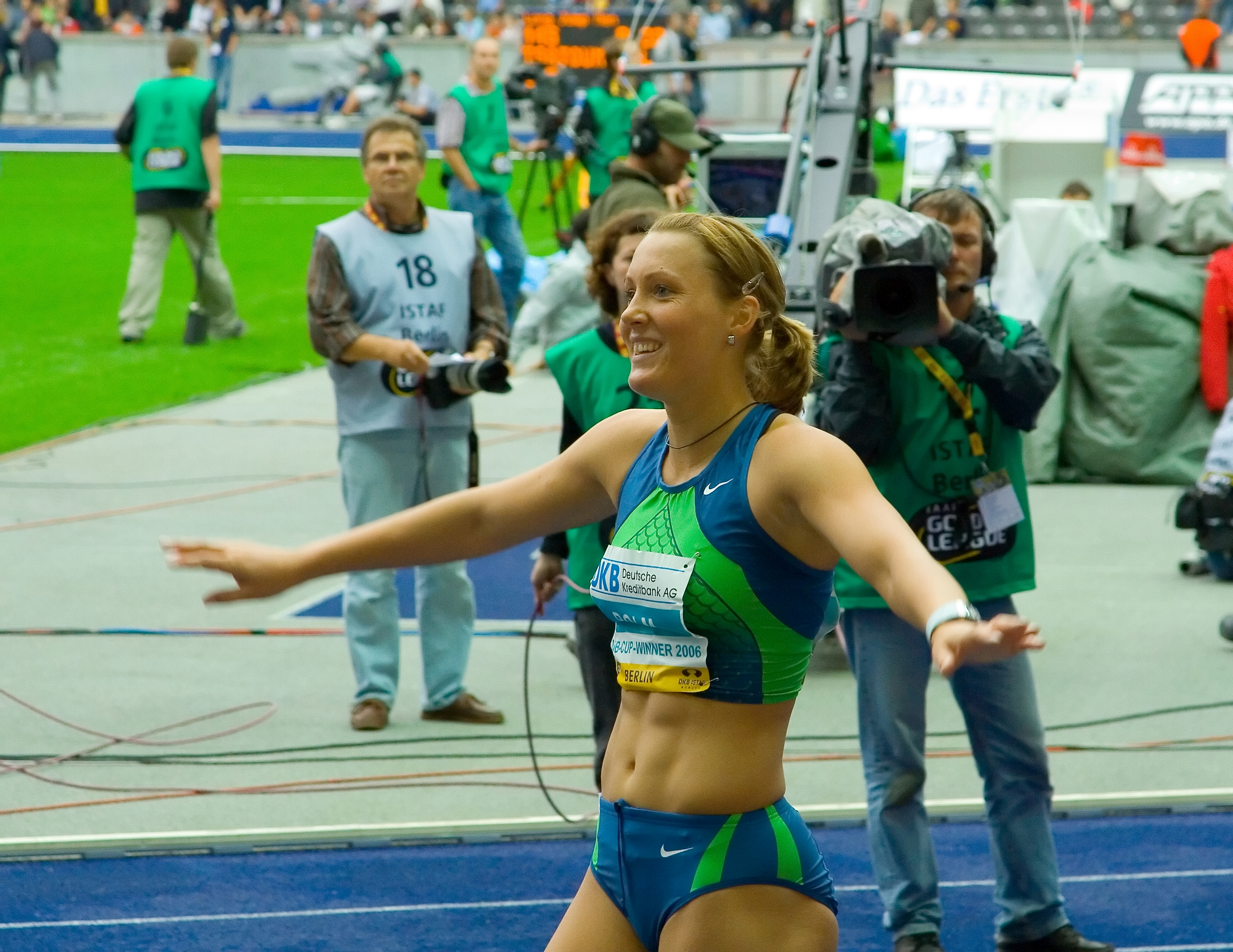
- Bolm at the 2006 Internationales Stadionfest

Personal information
- Born: 4 March 1975 (age 51) Frechen, West Germany

Sport
- Sport: Track and field
Medal record
Representing Germany
European Championships
Silver medal – second place	2006 Gothenburg	100m hurdles
European Indoor Championships
Silver medal – second place	2002 Vienna	60m hurdles
Bronze medal – third place	2005 Madrid	60m hurdles
Bronze medal – third place	2007 Birmingham	60m hurdles
Summer Universiade
Bronze medal – third place	1999 Palma de Mallorca	4x100m relay
World Junior Championships
Gold medal – first place	1994 Lisbon	100m hurdles

Kirsten Bolm (born 4 March 1975) is a retired German hurdler. She competed in the women's 100 metres hurdles at the 2004 Summer Olympics.

Bolm was an All-American jumper for the BYU Cougars track and field team, finishing 3rd in the long jump at the 2000 NCAA Division I Indoor Track and Field Championships. Bolm fell in her 2004 Olympic semi-final and was helped by Joanna Hayes.

Bolm's personal best is 12.59 seconds, achieved in July 2005 in the Crystal Palace Grand Prix at the Crystal Palace National Sports Centre.

Bolm was diagnosed with an inflamed heart muscle in 2007, ending her season. She graduated in psychology from the University of Heidelberg in 2009.

== Achievements ==
Year	Competition	Venue	Position	Event	Notes
Representing Germany
1992	World Junior Championships	Seoul, South Korea	5th	100 m hurdles	13.75 (wind: +1.0 m/s)
1994	World Junior Championships	Lisbon, Portugal	1st	100 m hurdles	13.26 (wind: +0.5 m/s)
1994	World Junior Championships	Lisbon, Portugal	5th	Long jump	6.33 m w (wind: +2.3 m/s)
2002	European Indoor Championships	Vienna, Austria	2nd	60 m hurdles	7.97
2005	European Indoor Championships	Madrid, Spain	3rd	60 m hurdles	8.00
2005	World Championships	Helsinki, Finland	4th	100 m hurdles	12.82
2005	World Athletics Final	Monte Carlo, Monaco	8th	100 m hurdles	12.84
2006	World Indoor Championships	Moscow, Russia	5th	60 m hurdles	7.93
2006	European Championships	Gothenburg, Sweden	2nd	100 m hurdles	12.72
2006	World Athletics Final	Stuttgart, Germany	8th	100 m hurdles	13.37
2007	European Indoor Championships	Birmingham, England	3rd	60 m hurdles	7.97
