= Sarah Claxton =

English hurdler

Personal information
- Nationality: British (English)
- Born: 23 September 1979 (age 46) Colchester, Essex, England
- Height: 167 cm (5 ft 6 in)
- Weight: 61 kg (134 lb)

Sport
- Sport: Track and field
- Event(s): 60 metres hurdles 100 metres hurdles Long jump
- Club: Belgrave Harriers; Woodford Green with Essex Ladies

Achievements and titles
- Olympic finals: 8th 2008
- Personal best(s): 12.81 (100m hurdles); 6.60 (long jump)

Sarah Louise Claxton (born 23 September 1979) is a retired English athlete who specialised in the 100 metres hurdles and competed at two Olympic Games.

== Biography ==
Claxton grew up in Colchester, Essex. She attended Monkwick Infant and Junior schools then went on to The Thomas Lord Audley School aged 11. Claxton formerly competed in the long jump, finishing second behind Andrea Coore in the long jump event at the 1997 AAA Championships and fourth at the 1998 World Junior Championships. Her personal best long jump was 6.60 metres, achieved in August 2003 in Tessenderlo.

After switching primarily to hurdles Claxton competed at the World Indoor Championships in 2001, 2003 and 2004. Claxton became the British 100 metres hurdles champion after winning the British AAA Championships title at the 2004 AAA Championships. Shortly afterwards at the 2004 Olympic Games in Athens, she represented Great Britain in the women's 100 metres hurdles.

She retained her AAA title in 2005 and 2006 and competed at the 2005 World Championships, 2006 and 2008 without reaching the final round.

Claxton won a fourth AAA title in 2008 and set her personal best time for 100m hurdles is 12.81 seconds, achieved in July 2008 in Loughborough. She is a former British record holder in the 60 metres hurdles, with a personal best of 7.96 seconds, achieved in February 2005 in Sheffield. However, this was beaten by Tiffany Porter in 2011 with a time of 7.80s at the 2011 European Athletics Indoor Championships.

She finished eighth at the 2008 Olympic Games.

In 2023, she took part in the third series of DNA Family Secrets, attempting to discover who her biological father is, having never known him. Professor Turi King was able to trace her father for her.
