= Diane Allahgreen =

British hurdler (born 1975)

Personal information
- Nationality: British (English)
- Born: 21 February 1975 (age 51) Liverpool, England
- Height: 164 cm (5 ft 5 in)
- Weight: 63 kg (139 lb)

Sport
- Sport: Athletics
- Event: hurdles
- Club: Trafford AC
Medal record
Representing Great Britain
European Indoor Championships
Bronze medal – third place	1998 Valencia	60m hurdles
Summer Universiade
Bronze medal – third place	1999 Palma de Mallorca	100m hurdles

Diane Allahgreen Hawkins (born 21 February 1975) is a former British Olympic sprint hurdler.

== Biography ==
Allahgreen finished second behind Angie Thorp in the 100 metres hurdles event at the 1996 AAA Championships.

After winning a bronze medal in the 60 m hurdles at the 1998 European Indoor Athletics Championships in Valencia she became the British 100 metres hurdles champion after winning the British AAA Championships title at the 2000 AAA Championships.

Shortly after her maiden British title, Allahgreen represented Great Britain at the 2000 Olympic Games in Sydney.

Further AAA titles were sealed at both the 2001 AAA Championships and 2002 AAA Championships. and then Allahgreen represented England at the 2002 Commonwealth Games in Manchester.

She retired from competition in 2006. and now works on Merseyside as a Child Protection Social Worker. She is married with two children, Che and Rio.

== Achievements ==
- 1994 World Junior Championships in Athletics:
  - bronze medal (100 m hurdles)
  - bronze medal (4 × 100 m relay) with Susie McLoughlin, Sinead Dudgeon, Rebecca Drummond
- 1998 European Indoor Athletics Championships – bronze medal (60 m hurdles)
