= Glory Alozie =

Spanish athlete (born 1977)

Personal information
- Born: 30 December 1977 (age 48) Amator, Abia State, Niger
Medal record
Women's athletics
Representing Nigeria
Olympic Games
Silver medal – second place	2000 Sydney	100 m hurdles
World Championships
Silver medal – second place	1999 Seville	100 m hurdles
World Indoor Championships
Silver medal – second place	1999 Maebashi	60 m hurdles
African Championships
Gold medal – first place	1996 Yaoundé	100 m hurdles
Gold medal – first place	1998 Dakar	100 m hurdles
Gold medal – first place	2000 Algiers	100 m hurdles
Representing Spain
World Indoor Championships
Silver medal – second place	2003 Birmingham	60 m hurdles
Silver medal – second place	2006 Moscow	60 m hurdles
European Athletics Championships
Gold medal – first place	2002 Munich	100 m hurdles

Gloria “Glory” Alozie Oluchi (born 30 December 1977) is a former track and field athlete competing mostly in hurdling. Born in Nigeria, she represented her country of birth and Spain.

The world junior second placer from 1996, she went on to have a successful senior career, although she has never won a global international event (placing second on five occasions). While representing Nigeria she became African champion twice, and was at a time the African record and Commonwealth record holder at 100 metres hurdles.

On 6 July 2001 she officially became a Spanish citizen. She won the gold medal at the 2002 European Athletics Championships the year after. In the 60 meter hurdles, she won the silver medal first at the World Indoor Championships in 2003 and again in 2006.

== Personal bests ==
Event	Time	Date	Venue
100 m	10.90	6 May 1999	La Laguna, Spain
200 m	23.09	14 July 2001	La Laguna, Spain
100 m hurdles	12.44	8 August 1998	Monaco

== International competitions ==
Year	Competition	Venue	Position	Event	Notes
Representing Nigeria
1995	African Junior Championships	Bouaké, Ivory Coast	2nd	100 m hurdles	14.21
1996	World Junior Championships	Sydney, Australia	2nd	100 m hurdles	13.30 (wind: +0.7 m/s)
1996	African Championships	Yaoundé, Cameroon	1st	100 m hurdles	13.62
1998	Grand Prix Final	Moscow, Russia	3rd	100 m hurdles	12.72
1998	African Championships	Dakar, Senegal	1st	100 m hurdles	12.77
1999	World Indoor Championships	Maebashi, Japan	2nd	60 m hurdles	7.87
1999	World Championships	Sevilla, Spain	2nd	100 m hurdles	12.44
2000	Olympic Games	Sydney, Australia	2nd	100 m hurdles	12.68
2000	Grand Prix Final	Doha, Qatar	2nd	100 m hurdles	12.94
Representing Spain
2002	World Cup	Madrid, Spain	3rd	100 m hurdles	12.95
2002	World Cup	Madrid, Spain	4th	100 m	11.28
2002	European Championships	Munich, Germany	1st	100 m hurdles	12.73
2002	European Championships	Munich, Germany	4th	100 m	11.32
2002	Grand Prix Final	Paris, France	4th	100 m hurdles	12.65
2003	World Indoor Championships	Birmingham, United Kingdom	2nd	60 m hurdles	7.90
2003	European Indoor Cup	Leipzig, Germany	1st	60 m hurdles	7.94
2003	World Athletics Final	Monaco	2nd	100 m hurdles	12.66
2003	World Championships	Paris Saint-Denis, France	4th	100 m hurdles	12.75
2003	European Cup	Florence, Italy	3rd	100 m	11.29
2003	European Cup	Florence, Italy	1st	100 m hurdles	12.86
2004	European Indoor Cup	Leipzig, Germany	2nd	60 m hurdles	7.99
2004	World Athletics Final	Monaco	4th	100 m hurdles	12.69
2005	European Indoor Championships	Madrid, Spain	4th	60 m hurdles	8.00
2005	World Athletics Final	Monaco	5th	100 m hurdles	12.76
2005	European Cup First League (A)	Gävle, Sweden	2nd	100 m hurdles	13.18
2005	European Cup First League (A)	Gävle, Sweden	1st	100 m	11.53
2005	Mediterranean Games	Almería, Spain	1st	100 m hurdles	12.90
2006	World Indoor Championships	Moscow, Russia	2nd	60 m hurdles	7.86
2006	European Championships	Gothenburg, Sweden	4th	100 m hurdles	12.86
2009	Mediterranean Games	Pescara, Italy	4th	100 m hurdles	13.42

Sporting positions
Preceded by Ludmila Engquist	Women's 100m Hurdles Best Year Performance; 1998	Succeeded by Gail Devers
