= Aleksandra Antonova (hurdler) =

Russian hurdler

Aleksandra Antonova (Russian: Александра Антонова; born March 24, 1980) is a Russian hurdler.

She finished sixth in 100 metres hurdles at the 2006 European Athletics Championships and at the 2006 IAAF World Cup. At the 2007 European Athletics Indoor Championships she won the silver medal in 60 metres hurdles.

Her personal best time is 12.78 seconds, achieved in July 2006 in Tula.
