= Edit Vári =

Hungarian hurdler

Personal information
- Nationality: Hungary
- Born: 31 May 1975 (age 51) Mosonmagyaróvár, Hungary
- Height: 1.72 m (5 ft 7 1/2 in)
- Weight: 61 kg (134 lb)

Sport
- Sport: Athletics
- Event: 100 metres hurdles
- Club: BEAC
- Coached by: Gyula Németh

Edit Vári (born May 31, 1975 in Mosonmagyaróvár) is a Hungarian sprint hurdler. At age thirty-three, Vari made her official debut for the 2008 Summer Olympics in Beijing, where she competed in the women's 100 m hurdles. She ran in the third heat against seven other athletes, including Australia's Sally McLellan, who later won the silver medal in the final. She finished the heat in last place by three hundredths of a second (0.03) behind Greece's Flora Redoumi, with a slowest possible time of 13.59 seconds. Vari, however, failed to advance into the semi-finals, as she placed thirty-sixth overall, and was ranked below two mandatory slots for the next round.
