= Athletics at the 2013 National Games of China =

Athletics at the 12th National Games of China
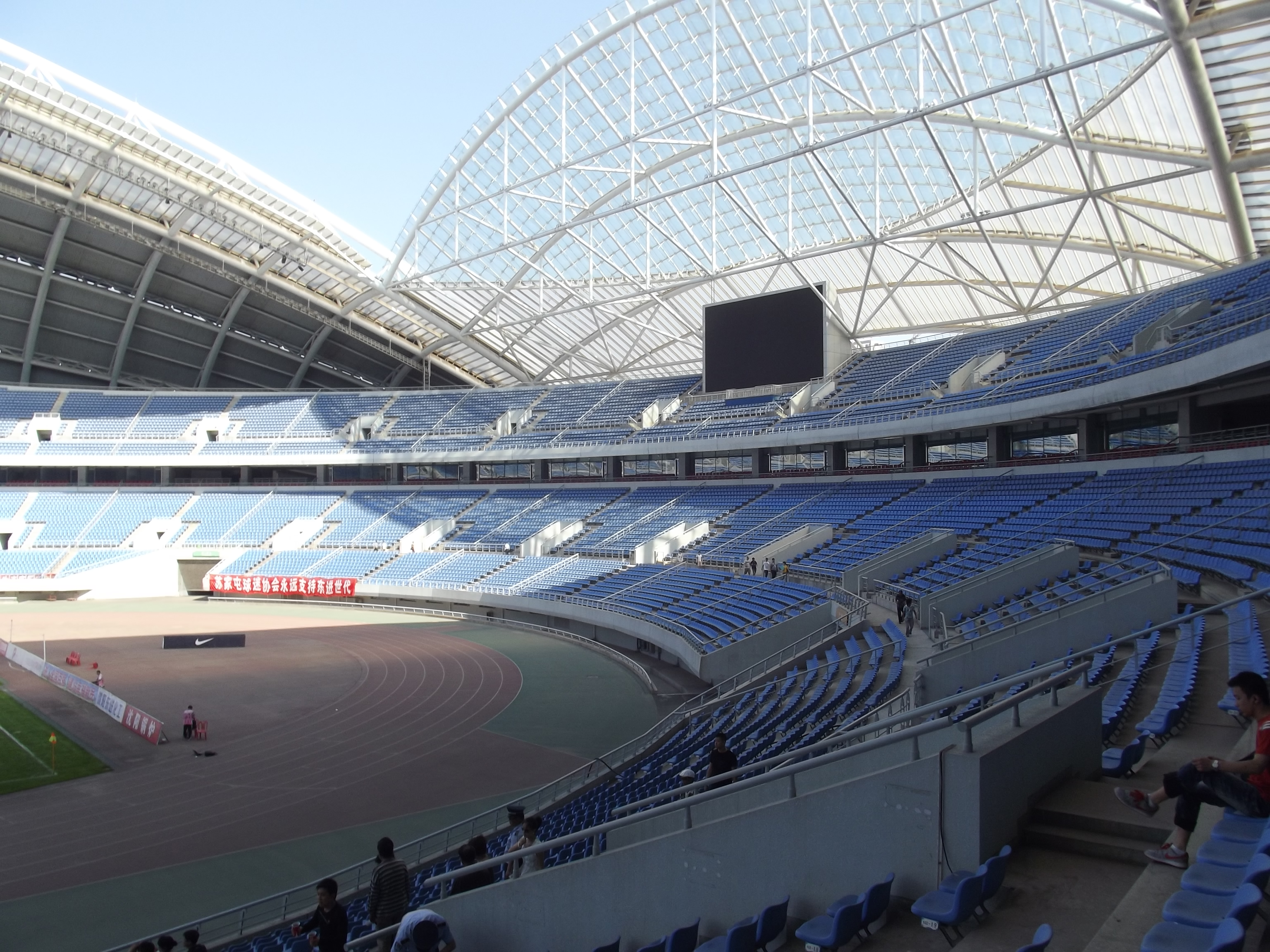
- The Shenyang Olympic Stadium hosted the events
- Dates: 7–11 September
- Host city: Shenyang, PR China
- Venue: Crystal Crown
- Level: Senior
- Events: 46
- Records set: 9 games records

At the 2013 National Games of China, the athletics events were held at the Crystal Crown in Shenyang, People's Republic of China from 7–11 September, 2013. The walks and marathon events were held in May, prior to the main track and field competitions.

Nine games records were equalled or bettered during the course of the five-day competition. In addition to those marks, Li Ling set an Asian record of 4.65 metres in the women's pole vault and Zhang Peimeng broke the Chinese record in the men's 200 metres with his run of 20.47 seconds. Zhang broke both games records in the short sprints. Li Jinzhe ranked fourth in the world that year with his games record of 8.34 m in the men's long jump. Zhao Qinggang's record of 83.14 m in the men's javelin throw was over seven metres clear of the rest of the field. The women's side of that event was closer, but Li Lingwei's winning mark of 63.06 m was a games record and made her eleventh best in the world for 2013.

Three of China's four medallists from the 2013 World Championships in Athletics were present. Women's throws bronze medallists Zhang Wenxiu (hammer throw) and Gong Lijiao (shot put) won their respective events over the reigning Asian Champions (Wang Zheng and Liu Xiangrong). Liu Hong was runner-up to Li Xiuzhi in the 20 kilometres walk, with Li being declared the winner in a rare photo-finish for the long-distance race. Asian champion Cao Shuo defeated Dong Bin in the men's triple jump with a clearance of 17.26 m – a mark which ranked him eighth overall that season. Zhao Jing emerged as the nation's top women's middle-distance runner by taking both the 800 metres and 1500 metres titles.

Jiangsu was the best performing team in the medal table, taking seven gold medals and seventeen medals overall. Shandong equalled that haul, but had six golds. The hosts Liaoning had the largest total, with 18 medals, although only two of these were gold. Guangdong, Shanghai and Beijing each took four golds in the athletics competition. Twenty-eight teams reached the medal table.

== Medal summary ==
=== Men ===
| Event | Gold | | Silver | | Bronze | |
|---|---|---|---|---|---|---|
| 100 metres | Zhang Peimeng; Beijing | 10.08 GR | Su Bingtian; Guangdong | 10.12 | Xie Zhenye; Zhejiang | 10.32 |
| 200 metres | Zhang Peimeng; Beijing | 20.47 NR, GR | Xie Zhenye; Zhejiang | 20.87 | Zhang Feng; Jiangsu | 20.99 |
| 400 metres | Chen Jianxin (athlete); Tianjin | 46.19 | Qu Shaowei; Guangdong | 46.42 | Zhu Chenbin; Shandong | 46.54 |
| 800 metres^{[a]} | | Did not play | | ? | | ? |
| 1500 metres | Zhang Haikun; Shanghai | 3:41.27 | Yu Zhiyang; Fujian | 3:42.11 | Yang Xiaofei; Shandong | 3:42.84 |
| 5000 metres^{[a]} | | Did not play | | ? | | ? |
| 10,000 metres | Ren Longyun; Qinghai | 29:03.83 | Sun Jiahui; Liaoning | 29:04.92 | Tai Yunlong; Liaoning | 29:06.21 |
| 110 metres hurdles | Xie Wenjun; Shanghai | 13.36 | Jiang Fan; Jiangsu | 13.52 | Ji Wei; People's Liberation Army | 13.65 |
| 400 metres hurdles | Cheng Wen; Shandong | 50.08 | Chen Ke; Zhejiang | 50.80 | Shao Jianfeng; Chongqing | 50.94 |
| 3000 metres steeplechase | Wang Yashuan; Shaanxi | 8:37.66 | Zhang Zhongji; People's Liberation Army | 8:38.97 | Yang Tao; Ningxia | 8:39.65 |
| 4×100 metres relay | Guangdong; Tan Juquan; Mo Youxue; Su Bingtian; Liang Jiahong | 38.73 GR | Sichuan; Ma Jun; Xu Cheng; Deng Shijie; Huang Xiang | 39.12 | Zhejiang; Zhang Junpeng; Zhong Sheng; Ye Zhiqiao; Xie Zhenye | 39.25 |
| 4×400 metres relay | Guangdong; Cui Haojing; Qin Jian; Liu Xiaosheng; Qu Shaowei | 3:05.14 | Shandong; Cheng Wen; Wang Weihai; Zhang Yaorong; Zhu Chenbin | 3:05.28 | Tianjin; Lu Yuanshuai; Wang Di; Wang Lei; Chen Jianxin | 3:05.34 |
| Marathon | Yin Shujin; Qinghai | 2:18:03 | Han Gang; Sichuan | 2:18:18 | Tai Yunlong; Liaoning | 2:18:24 |
| 20 km walk | Wang Zhen; Heilongjiang | 1:19:54 | Cai Zelin; Yunnan | 1:20:18 | Bian Fongda; Shandong | 1:22:41 |
| 20 km walk team | Shandong; Jiang Jie; Liu Jianmin; Su Guanyu; Sun Chenggang; Yu Wei | 6:53:12 (13 pts) | Liaoning; Ji Chunlong; Lee Shijia; Lu Hongyue; Qu Guan Chen; Wang Gang | 6:57:21 (11 pts) | Inner Mongolia; Chu Yafei; Huen Xi; Ma Youshan; Wang Hao; Xie Sichao | 6:59:18 (10 pts) |
| 50 km walk | Wu Qianlong; Inner Mongolia | 3:51:35 | Li Jianbo; Yunnan | 3:52:12 | Si Tianfeng; Shandong | 3:53:19 |
| High jump | Wang Yu; Beijing | 2.29 m | Pai Long; Tianjin | 2.26 m | Wang Chen; Tianjin | 2.23 m |
| Pole vault | Xue Changrui; Shandong | 5.60 m GR= | Yang Yansheng; Shandong | 5.50 m | Yao Jie; Anhui | 5.50 m |
| Long jump | Li Jinzhe; Beijing | 8.34 m GR | Su Xiongfeng; Hubei | 8.08 m | Zhang Yaoguang; Liaoning | 7.98 m |
| Triple jump | Cao Shuo; Hebei | 17.26 m | Dong Bin; Hunan | 16.76 m | Fu Haitao; Fujian | 16.43 m |
| Shot put | Wang Guangfu; Henan | 20.12 m | Liu Yang; Liaoning | 19.77 m | Ding Weiye; Inner Mongolia | 19.12 m |
| Discus throw | Wu Jian; Jiangsu | 60.98 m | Tulake Nuermaimaiti; Xinjiang | 59.82 m | Hong Qingbin; Henan | 58.89 m |
| Hammer throw | Wang Shizhu; Liaoning | 75.20 m GR | Wan Yong; Jiangxi | 73.49 m | Qi Dakai; Shaanxi | 71.82 m |
| Javelin throw | Zhao Qinggang; Liaoning | 83.14 m GR | Chen Qi; Shanghai | 75.88 m | Sun Jianjun; Zhejiang | 75.27 m |
| Decathlon | Zhu Hengjun; People's Liberation Army | 7662 pts | Liu Haibo; Liaoning | 7575 pts | Qi Haifeng; Liaoning | 7520 pts |

- ^{a} The games of the men's 800 metres and 5000 metres were not held due to China's poor performance in these events.

=== Women ===
| Event | Gold | | Silver | | Bronze | |
|---|---|---|---|---|---|---|
| 100 metres | Tao Yujia; Jiangxi | 11.48 | Wei Yongli; Guangxi | 11.48 | Jiang Lan; Jiangsu | 11.53 |
| 200 metres | Jiang Lan; Jiangsu | 23.31 | Kong Lingwei; Heilongjiang | 23.44 | Zhu Yayun; Jiangsu | 23.51 |
| 400 metres | Zhao Yanmin; Shandong | 52.15 | Chen Jingwen; Guangdong | 52.79 | Cheng Chong; Shandong | 53.14 |
| 800 metres | Zhao Jing; Shanghai | 2:02.36 | Wang Chunyu; Anhui | 2:02.74 | Song Tingting; Liaoning | 2:03.26 |
| 1500 metres | Zhao Jing; Shanghai | 4:12.32 | Liu Fang; Sichuan | 4:13.88 | Zheng Xiaolin; Liaoning | 4:14.12 |
| 5000 metres | Jiang Xiaoli; Shandong | 15:49.14 | Cao Mojie; Qinghai | 15:49.22 | Xue Fei; Jiangsu | 15:49.47 |
| 10,000 metres | Cao Mojie; Qinghai | 31:55.66 | Liu Ruihuan; Henan | 31:56.80 | Jiang Xiaoli; Shandong | 31:58.34 |
| 100 metres hurdles | Wu Shuijiao; Guangdong | 12.96 | Sun Yawei; Jiangsu | 13.01 | Wang Dou; Jiangsu | 13.09 |
| 400 metres hurdles | Xiao Xia; Jiangsu | 56.25 | Yang Qi; Sichuan | 58.30 | Li Manyuan; Jiangsu | 58.68 |
| 4×100 metres relay | Jiangsu; Xu Meiling; Zhu Yayun; Jiang Lan; Yuan Qiqi | 43.44 | Zhejiang; Ye Jiabei; Xing Lulu; He Jiawen; Wang Xiaojiao | 44.25 | Guangdong; Han Huijiang; Jiang Shan; Wu Shuijiao; Li Meijuan | 44.43 |
| 4×400 metres relay | Guangdong; Tang Xiaoyin; Li Xueji; Chen Yanmei; Chen Jingwen | 3:31.21 | Shandong; Chen Lin; Cheng Chong; Geng Qingyu; Zhao Yanmin | 3:31.98 | Jiangsu; Fang Fang; Xiao Xia; Pan Gaoqin; Li Manyuan | 3:32.38 |
| Half marathon | Liu Zhuang; Jiangsu | 1:15:07 | Pan Yinli; Yunnan | 1:15:21 | Lu Jiao; Liaoning | 1:15:52 |
| Marathon | Jia Chaofeng; Gansu | 2:29:45 | Ding Changqin; Guizhou | 2:30:20 | Wei Xiaojie; Jiangsu | 2:31:00 |
| Marathon team | Jiangsu; Wang Tian; Yue Chao; Hao Xiaofan; Wang Xueqin; Liu Zhuang; Wei Xiaojie | 12:52:10 (13 pts) | Yunnan; Pan Yinli; Fu Tinglian; Zhang Kaiqin; Zheng Wenrong; Lin Lizhi; Zao Youli | 12:58:52 (11 pts) | Liaoning; Zheng Xiaolin; Zhu Xiaolin; Sun Weiwei; Lu Jiao; Jin Man; Mu Yu | 13:10:32 (10 pts) |
| 20 km walk | Lü Xiuzhi; Anhui | 1:27:53 | Liu Hong; Guangdong | 1:27:53 | Li Yanfei; Shandong | 1:28:03 |
| 20 km walk team | Jiangsu; He Qin; Shi Tianshu; Su Yingqiu; Nie Jingjing; Zhang Xuhong | 7:36:59 (13 pts) | Chongqing; Li Ping; Luo Xingcai; Shi Yang; Xie Lijuan; Xu Yaozhi | 7:56:58 (11 pts) | Shandong; Chen Shuangyan; Li Hua; Wang Shanshan; Wang Zhenzhen; Yang Lei | 8:07:58 (10 pts) |
| High jump | Zheng Xingjuan; Fujian | 1.92 m | Wang Yang; Liaoning | 1.92 m | Zhang Luyu; Xinjiang | 1.87 m |
| Pole vault | Li Ling; Zhejiang | 4.65 m AR, GR | Ren Mengqian; Zhejiang | 4.40 m | Wu Sha; Anhui | 4.40 m |
| Long jump | Xu Xiaoling; Henan | 6.48 m | Jiang Yanfei; Hunan | 6.26 m | Wang Wupin; Fujian | 6.24 m |
| Triple jump | Xie Limei; Fujian | 14.39 m | Li Yanmei; Guangdong | 14.35 m | Deng Lina; Hebei | 13.92 m |
| Shot put | Gong Lijiao; Hebei | 19.75 m | Liu Xiangrong; Inner Mongolia | 18.45 m | Li Ling; Liaoning | 18.40 m |
| Discus throw | Tan Jian; Sichuan | 64.11 m | Li Yanfeng; Heilongjiang | 63.91 m | Yang Yanbo; Shanghai | 63.30 m |
| Hammer throw | Zhang Wenxiu; People's Liberation Army | 73.68 m | Wang Zheng; Shaanxi | 71.48 m | Liu Tingting; Liaoning | 68.62 m |
| Javelin throw | Li Lingwei; Shandong | 63.06 m GR | Zhang Li; People's Liberation Army | 62.07 m | Chang Chunfeng; Heilongjiang | 60.90 m |
| Heptathlon | Wang Qingling; Fujian | 5785 pts | Sun Lu; Liaoning | 5580 pts | Li Weijian; Heilongjiang | 5509 pts |

== Medal table ==
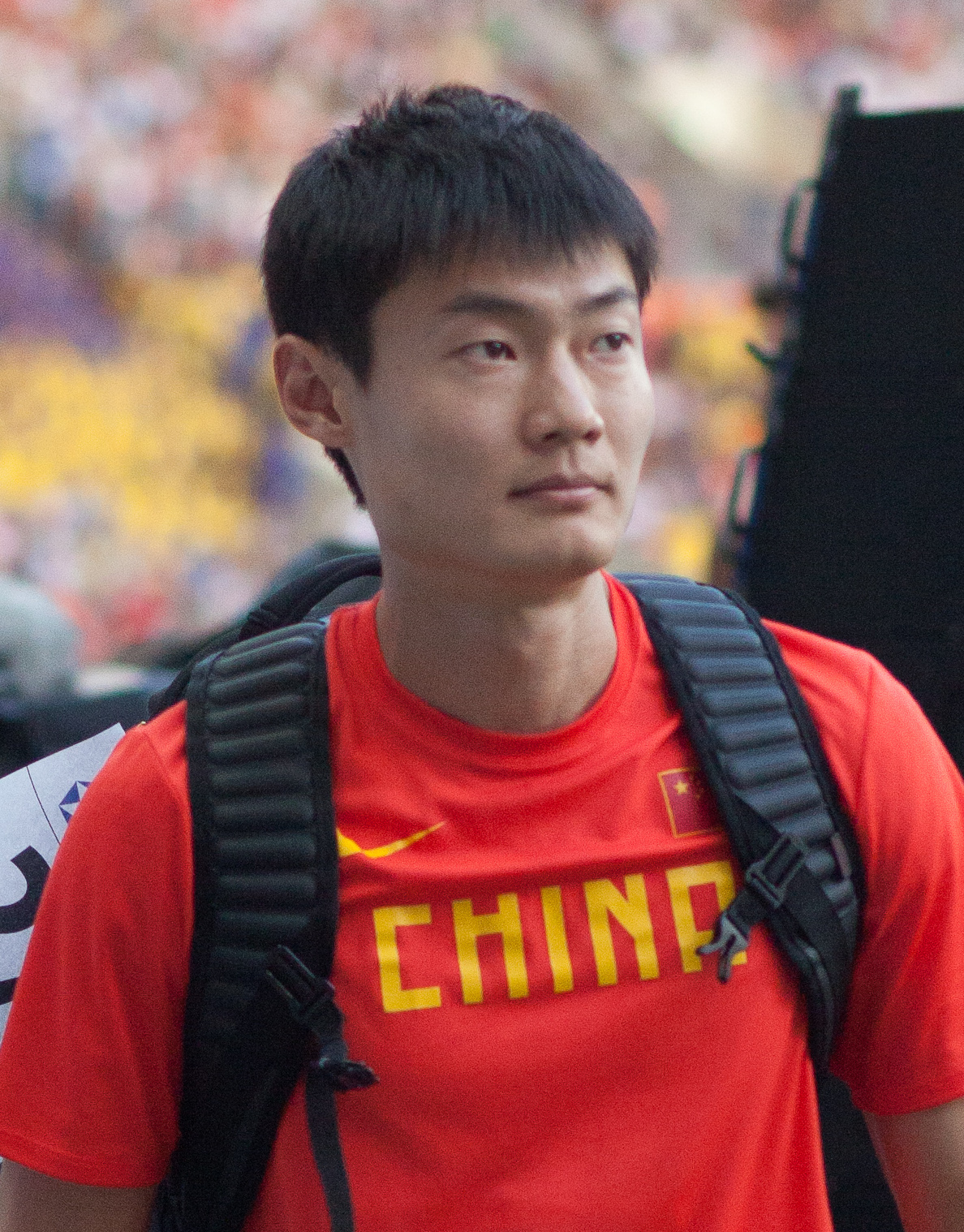
Zhang Peimeng won two of Beijing's four gold medals.

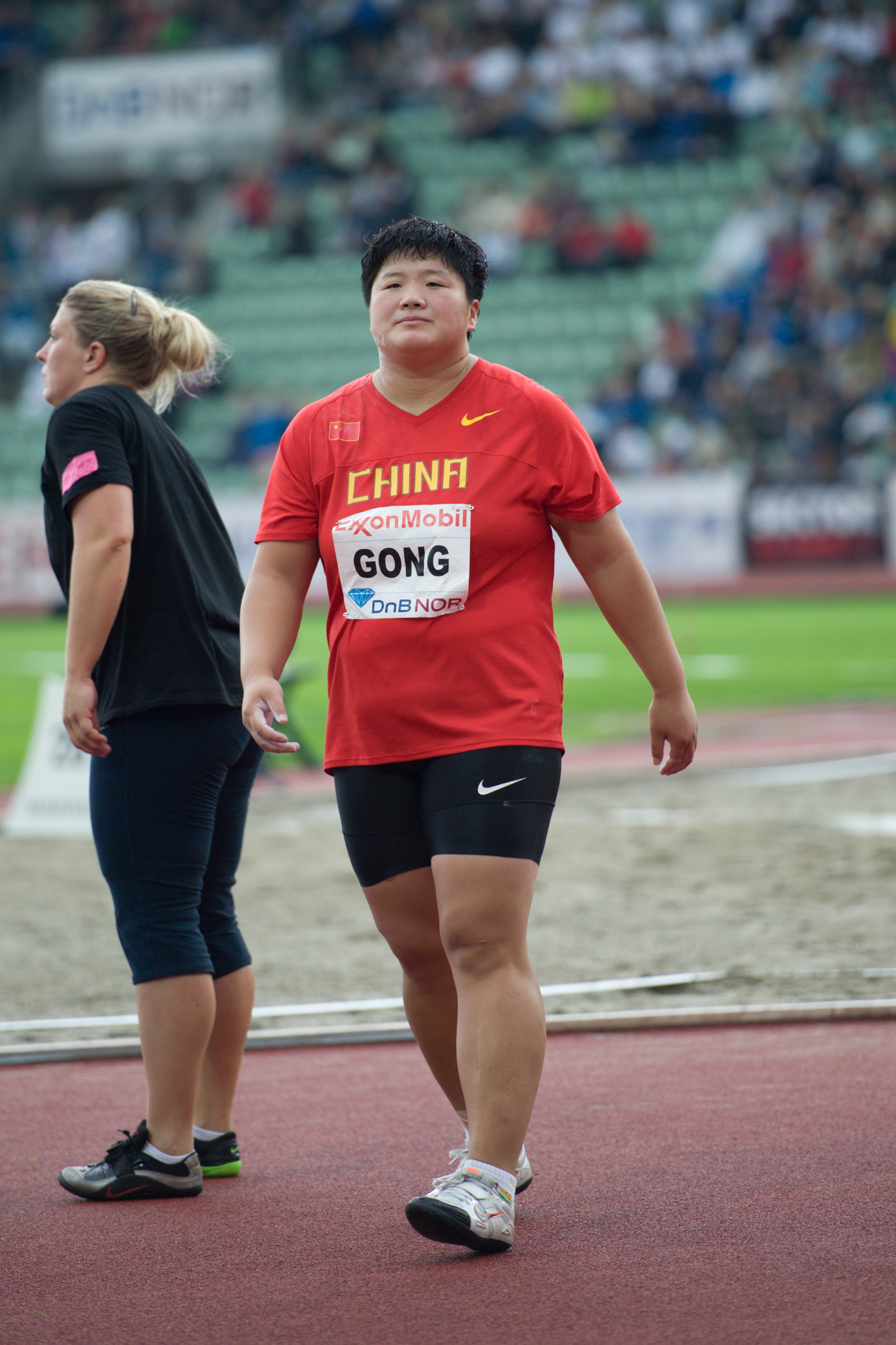
Shot put winner Gong Lijiao was one of three medallists for Hebei.

| Rank | Delegation | Gold | Silver | Bronze | Total |
|---|---|---|---|---|---|
| 1 | Jiangsu | 7 | 2 | 8 | 17 |
| 2 | Shandong | 6 | 3 | 8 | 17 |
| 3 | Guangdong | 4 | 3 | 1 | 8 |
| 4 | Shanghai | 4 | 1 | 1 | 6 |
| 5 | Beijing | 4 | 0 | 0 | 4 |
| 6 | Fujian | 3 | 1 | 2 | 6 |
| 7 | Qinghai | 3 | 1 | 0 | 4 |
| 8 | Liaoning | 2 | 6 | 10 | 18 |
| 9 | People's Liberation Army | 2 | 2 | 1 | 5 |
| 10 | Henan | 2 | 1 | 1 | 4 |
| 11 | Hebei | 2 | 0 | 1 | 3 |
| 12 | Zhejiang | 1 | 4 | 3 | 8 |
| 13 | Sichuan | 1 | 4 | 0 | 5 |
| 14 | Heilongjiang | 1 | 2 | 2 | 5 |
| 15 | Anhui | 1 | 1 | 2 | 4 |
| 15 | Inner Mongolia | 1 | 1 | 2 | 4 |
| 15 | Tianjin | 1 | 1 | 2 | 4 |
| 18 | Shaanxi | 1 | 1 | 1 | 3 |
| 19 | Jiangxi | 1 | 1 | 0 | 2 |
| 20 | Gansu | 1 | 0 | 0 | 1 |
| 21 | Yunnan | 0 | 4 | 0 | 4 |
| 22 | Hunan | 0 | 2 | 0 | 2 |
| 23 | Chongqing | 0 | 1 | 1 | 2 |
| 23 | Xinjiang | 0 | 1 | 1 | 2 |
| 25 | Guangxi | 0 | 1 | 0 | 1 |
| 25 | Guizhou | 0 | 1 | 0 | 1 |
| 25 | Hubei | 0 | 1 | 0 | 1 |
| 28 | Ningxia | 0 | 0 | 1 | 1 |
| Totals (28 entries) | | 48 | 46 | 48 | 142 |
