= 2015 Asian Athletics Championships – Women's 100 metres hurdles =

The women's 100 metres hurdles event at the 2015 Asian Athletics Championships was held on June 3.

== Medalists ==
Gold	Wu Shuijiao; China
Silver	Anastassiya Pilipenko; Kazakhstan
Bronze	Ayako Kimura; Japan

== Results ==
=== Heats ===
First 2 in each heat (Q) and the next 2 fastest (q) qualified for the final.

Wind:
Heat 1: -0.4 m/s, Heat 2: +0.6 m/s

Rank	Heat	Name	Nationality	Time	Notes
1	1	Wu Shuijiao	China	13.21	Q
2	2	Anastassiya Pilipenko	Kazakhstan	13.31	Q
3	2	Hitomi Shimura	Japan	13.35	Q
4	2	Kang Ya	China	13.44	Q
5	1	Jung Hye-lim	South Korea	13.46	Q
6	1	Ayako Kimura	Japan	13.51	Q
7	2	Sun Yawei	China	13.53	q
8	2	Gayathri Govindaraj	India	13.60	q
9	1	Valentina Kibalnikova	Uzbekistan	13.82	
10	2	Lui Lai Yiu	Hong Kong	14.05	
11	1	Hsieh Shi-En	Chinese Taipei	14.16	
12	1	P. Deepika	India	14.25	
13	1	Trinh Thi Thu Mai	Vietnam	14.97	
14	2	Kerstin Ong	Singapore	15.55	
15	2	Christel El Saneh	Lebanon	15.63	

=== Final ===
Wind: -0.4 m/s

Rank	Lane	Name	Nationality	Result	Notes
1st place, gold medalist(s)	4	Wu Shuijiao	China	13.12	
2nd place, silver medalist(s)	5	Anastassiya Pilipenko	Kazakhstan	13.33	
3rd place, bronze medalist(s)	9	Ayako Kimura	Japan	13.41	
4	8	Kang Ya	China	13.46	
5	6	Hitomi Shimura	Japan	13.48	
6	7	Jung Hye-lim	South Korea	13.54	
7	2	Gayathri Govindaraj	India	13.69	
8	3	Sun Yawei	China	13.72	
