= Jennifer =

Jennifer or Jenifer may refer to:

== People ==
- Jennifer (given name)
- Jenifer (singer), French pop singer
- Jennifer Warnes, American singer who formerly used the stage name Jennifer
- Daniel of St. Thomas Jenifer
- Daniel Jenifer

== Film and television ==
- Jennifer (1953 film), a film starring Ida Lupino
- Jennifer (1978 film), a horror film by Brice Mack
- Jennifer, a 1998 Ghanaian film starring Brew Riverson Jnr
- "Jenifer" (Masters of Horror), an episode of Masters of Horror

== Music ==
- The Jennifers, a British band, some of whose members later formed Supergrass
- Jenifer (album), an album by French singer Jenifer
- Jennifer (album), a 1972 album by Jennifer Warnes
- "Jennifer", a 1974 song by Faust from Faust IV
- "Jennifer", a 1983 song by Eurythmics from Sweet Dreams (Are Made of This) (album)
- "Jennifer", a 2001 song by M2M from The Big Room

== Other uses ==
- Hurricane Jennifer
- Project Jennifer, a CIA attempt to recover a Soviet submarine in 1974

== See also ==
- Jeniffer Viturino (1993–2011), Brazilian fashion model
- Jenniffer González-Colón (born in 1976), Puerto Rican politician
- Jenny (disambiguation)
- Jenni, a given name
- Jenna, a given name
- Yennifer (disambiguation), a given name
