= Jenney =

Jenney may refer to:

People

- Jack Jenney (1910–1945), jazz trombonist
- Lucinda Jenney (born 1954), American actress
- Neil Jenney (born 1945), self-taught artist
- Newton-Jenney Party led by Henry Newton and Walter P. Jenney
- Ralph E. Jenney (1883–1945), United States federal judge and attorney
- William Le Baron Jenney (1832–1907), American architect and engineer

Locations

- Jenney Grist Mill, working grist mill located in Plymouth, Massachusetts
- Jenney Stockade Site, stage station on the Cheyenne-Deadwood route near Newcastle, Wyoming

== See also ==
- Janney (disambiguation)
- Jeannie (disambiguation)
- Jeanny (disambiguation)
- Jennie (disambiguation)
- Jenny (disambiguation)
