= Jennika (disambiguation) =

Jennika is a superheroine appearing in Teenage Mutant Ninja Turtles comic books.

Jennika may also refer to:

- Jennika Hanusaari, Finnish winner of Miss Universe 2010

== See also ==
- Jennica
- Jennifer (disambiguation)
- Jenny (disambiguation)
