= Mami Ishino =

Japanese hurdler (born 1983)

Personal information
- Nationality: Japanese
- Born: 10 January 1983 (age 43) Chiba Prefecture, Japan
- Education: Japan Women's College of Physical Education
- Height: 1.69 m (5 ft 7 in)
- Weight: 53 kg (117 lb)

Sport
- Country: Japan
- Sport: Track and field
- Event: 100 metres hurdles
- Personal best: 13.08 (Odawara 2006)
Medal record
Women's athletics
Representing Japan
Asian Championships
Gold medal – first place	2007 Amman	100 m hurdles
East Asian Games
Silver medal – second place	2009 Hong Kong	100 m hurdles

Mami Ishino (石野 真美, Ishino Mami; born 10 January 1983) is a Japanese track and field athlete who specialises in the 100 metres hurdles. Her personal best for the event is 13.08 seconds.

Her greatest achievement was a gold medal at the 2007 Asian Athletics Championships. She also represented her country at the 2007 World Championships in Athletics, held in Osaka that year. She was the silver medalist at the 2009 East Asian Games. Ishino won national titles in the hurdles in 2006 and 2007.

== Career ==
Born in Chiba Prefecture, she attended high school in Otaki before gaining a degree from the Japan Women's College of Physical Education. After graduation she signed up with the Hasegawa Corporation track team. Her breakthrough year came in 2004, when she placed fourth in the 100 m hurdles at the Japan Championships in Athletics, won the Japan universities title, then set a personal best of 13.44 seconds to win at the National Sports Festival of Japan. She defended her national games title the following year. That year she had runner-up placings at the Japanese Championships and the Japan Corporate Track and Field Championships, improving her best to 13.33 seconds at the latter competition. Her international debut came at the 2005 Asian Athletics Championships and she finished just two hundredths behind bronze medallist and fellow Japanese Kumiko Imura. A run of 13.08 seconds in Odawara brought her to third on the all-time Japanese lists.

She secured her first national title in 2006 and was also runner-up at the Corporate Championships and Japanese Games. Ishino won a second, consecutive national title the following year and also topped the podium at the 2007 Asian Athletics Championships with her time of 13.26 seconds. She won the titles at the corporate meet and the National Games as well. She made her global debut at the 2007 World Championships, but did not get past the heats stage.

In 2008, she found herself finishing behind teenager Asuka Terada at both the national championships and the national games. She opened 2009 with a win at the Oda Memorial. She again was beaten by Terada at two competitions, coming second in the Japanese championship and missing the medals at the 2009 Asian Athletics Championships (Terada was runner-up). Ishino did manage to win at the Japanese Games and Corporate championships that year. She was the silver medallist behind Sun Yawei at the 2009 East Asian Games in December.

Ishino retained her corporate title in 2010, but was third at the Japanese Championships and Games and did not compete internationally. For the first since 2004, Ishino failed to reach the top three at the 2011 Japan Championships in Athletics and also had to settle for third at the corporate meet and the Japanese Games. Her form continued to diminish in 2012 and 2013, as she failed even to reach the national finals in the 100 m hurdles.

== International competition ==
Year	Competition	Venue	Position	Event	Time (s)
Representing Japan
2005	Asian Athletics Championships	Incheon, South Korea	4th	100 m hurdles	13.56 (wind: +0.4 m/s)
2007	Asian Athletics Championships	Amman, Jordan	1st	100 m hurdles	13.26 (wind: +1.9 m/s)
2007	World Athletics Championships	Osaka, Japan	30th (h)	100 m hurdles	13.29 (wind: +0.4 m/s)
2009	Asian Athletics Championships	Guangzhou, China	4th	100 m hurdles	13.39 (wind: +0.5 m/s)
2009	East Asian Games	Hong Kong, China	2nd	100 m hurdles	13.42 (wind: +0.5 m/s)

== National titles ==
- Japanese Athletics Championships
  - 100 m hurdles: 2006, 2007
