= 2013 Asian Athletics Championships – Women's 100 metres hurdles =

The women's 100 metres hurdles event at the 2013 Asian Athletics Championships was held at the Shree Shiv Chhatrapati Sports Complex. The final took place on 5 July.

== Medalists ==
Gold	Silver	Bronze
Ayako Kimura; Japan	Anastassiya Soprunova; Kazakhstan	Jayapal Hemasree; India

== Results ==
=== Heats ===
First 3 in each heat (Q) and 2 best performers (q) advanced to the semifinals.

Wind: Heat 1: +0.1 m/s, Heat 2: -0.2 m/s

Rank	Heat	Name	Nationality	Time	Notes
1	1	Anastassiya Soprunova	Kazakhstan	13.47	Q
2	2	Hitomi Shimura	Japan	13.60	Q
3	1	Ayako Kimura	Japan	13.61	Q
4	1	Wang Dou	China	13.71	Q
4	2	Anastassiya Pilipenko	Kazakhstan	13.71	Q
6	1	Gayathri Govindaraj	India	13.78	q
7	2	Jayapal Hemasree	India	14.07	Q
8	2	Emilia Nova	Indonesia	14.67	q
9	1	Maria Maratab	Pakistan	15.68	
10	2	Keshari Chaudhari	Nepal	17.61	

=== Final ===
Wind: -0.5 m/s

Rank	Name	Nationality	Time	Notes
1st place, gold medalist(s)	Ayako Kimura	Japan	13.25	
2nd place, silver medalist(s)	Anastassiya Soprunova	Kazakhstan	13.44	
3rd place, bronze medalist(s)	Jayapal Hemasree	India	14.01	
4	Gayathri Govindaraj	India	14.07	
	Anastassiya Pilipenko	Kazakhstan	DQ	
	Hitomi Shimura	Japan	DQ	
	Wang Dou	China	DNF	
	Emilia Nova	Indonesia	DNS	
