= Athletics at the 2014 Asian Games – Women's 100 metres hurdles =

Women's 100 metres hurdles at the 2014 Asian Games
- Venue: Incheon Asiad Main Stadium
- Dates: 30 September – 1 October 2014
- Competitors: 14 from 10 nations

Medalists
gold medal	Wu Shuijiao	China
silver medal	Sun Yawei	China
bronze medal	Ayako Kimura	Japan

The women's 100 metres hurdles event at the 2014 Asian Games was held at the Incheon Asiad Main Stadium, Incheon, South Korea on 30 September – 1 October.

== Schedule ==
All times are Korea Standard Time (UTC+09:00)

Date	Time	Event
Tuesday, 30 September 2014	18:45	Round 1
Wednesday, 1 October 2014	18:35	Final

== Records ==
Prior to this competition, the existing world, Asian and Games records were as follows.

World Record	Yordanka Donkova (BUL)	12.21	Stara Zagora, Bulgaria	20 August 1988
Asian Record	Olga Shishigina (KAZ)	12.44	Lucerne, Switzerland	27 June 1995
Games Record	Olga Shishigina (KAZ)	12.63	Bangkok, Thailand	19 December 1998

== Results ==
Legend

- DNF — Did not finish
- DSQ — Disqualified

=== Round 1 ===
- Qualification: First 3 in each heat (Q) and the next 2 fastest (q) advance to the final.

==== Heat 1 ====
- Wind: +0.7 m/s

Rank	Athlete	Time	Notes
1	Wu Shuijiao (CHN)	13.00	Q
2	Jung Hye-lim (KOR)	13.17	Q
3	Valentina Kibalnikova (UZB)	13.52	Q
4	Masumi Aoki (JPN)	13.76	
5	Wallapa Punsoongneun (THA)	13.77	
6	Lui Lai Yiu (HKG)	13.99	
7	Fatemeh Sassanipoor (QAT)	17.93	

==== Heat 2 ====
- Wind: +0.7 m/s

Rank	Athlete	Time	Notes
1	Sun Yawei (CHN)	13.26	Q
2	Ayako Kimura (JPN)	13.47	Q
3	Lee Yeon-kyung (KOR)	13.67	Q
4	Dedeh Erawati (INA)	13.70	q
5	Anastassiya Pilipenko (KAZ)	13.73	q
6	Manivanh Chanthavong (LAO)	15.14	
7	Badia Camara (QAT)	15.94	

=== Final ===
- Wind: 0.0 m/s

Rank	Athlete	Time	Notes
1st place, gold medalist(s)	Wu Shuijiao (CHN)	12.72	
2nd place, silver medalist(s)	Sun Yawei (CHN)	13.05	
3rd place, bronze medalist(s)	Ayako Kimura (JPN)	13.25	
4	Jung Hye-lim (KOR)	13.39	
5	Valentina Kibalnikova (UZB)	13.47	
6	Lee Yeon-kyung (KOR)	13.73	
—	Anastassiya Pilipenko (KAZ)	DNF	
—	Dedeh Erawati (INA)	DSQ	
