= Athletics at the 2012 Summer Olympics – Women's 100 metres hurdles =

Women's 100 metres hurdles at the Games of the XXX Olympiad
- Venue: Olympic Stadium
- Date: 6–7 August
- Competitors: 50 from 36 nations
- Winning time: 12.35 OR

Medalists
| 1st place, gold medalist(s) | | Sally Pearson | Australia |
| 2nd place, silver medalist(s) | | Dawn Harper | United States |
| 3rd place, bronze medalist(s) | | Kellie Wells | United States |

Official Video

The women's 100 metres hurdles competition at the 2012 Summer Olympics in London, United Kingdom was held at the Olympic Stadium on 6–7 August.

The semi-finals showed all the top athletes were at their best, with the first 5 finalists achieving their personal best, except Sally Pearson who improved the 2012 world leading time.

In the final under London rains, Pearson led from the start but after ticking a hurdle, defending champion Dawn Harper closed fast to make it close. Kellie Wells was solidly in third while Lolo Jones edged Yanit for fourth place. It was an Olympic record for Pearson, a new personal best for Harper and Wells, equal personal best for 6th place Phylicia George and a season best for Jones after a difficult journey from the next to last hurdle four years earlier.

== Competition format ==
The women's 100m Hurdles competition consisted of heats (Round 1), Semifinals and a Final. The fastest competitors from each race in the heats qualified for the Semifinals along with the fastest overall competitors not already qualified that were required to fill the available spaces in the Semifinals. A total of eight competitors qualified for the Final from the Semifinals.

== Records ==
Prior to the competition, the existing World and Olympic records were as follows.

| World record | Yordanka Donkova (BUL) | 12.21 | Stara Zagora, Bulgaria | 20 August 1988 |
| Olympic record | Joanna Hayes (USA) | 12.37 | Athens, Greece | 24 August 2004 |
| 2012 World leading | Sally Pearson (AUS) | 12.40 | Paris, France | 6 July 2012 |

The following new Olympic record was set during this competition:

| Date | Event | Athlete | Time | Notes |
|---|---|---|---|---|
| 7 August | Final | Sally Pearson (AUS) | 12.35 | OR |

== Schedule ==
All times are British Summer Time (UTC+1).

| Date | Time | Round |
|---|---|---|
| Monday, 6 August 2012 | 10:05 | Round 1 |
| Tuesday, 7 August 2012 | 19:15; 21:15 | Semifinals; Finals |

== Results ==
=== Round 1 ===
Qual. rule: first 3 of each heat (Q) plus the 6 fastest times (q) qualified.

==== Heat 1 ====
| Rank | Athlete | Nation | Time | Notes |
|---|---|---|---|---|
| 1 | Alina Talay | Belarus | 12.71 | Q, PB |
| 2 | Jessica Zelinka | Canada | 12.75 | Q |
| 3 | Tiffany Porter | Great Britain | 12.79 | Q |
| 4 | Anne Zagré | Belgium | 13.04 | q |
| 5 | Marina Tomić | Slovenia | 13.10 | |
| 6 | Rosvitha Okou | Ivory Coast | 13.62 | SB |
| 7 | Ayako Kimura | Japan | 13.75 | |
| —N/a | Rahamatou Drame | Mali | —N/a | DQ |

- Rahamatou Drame was disqualified for false starting.

==== Heat 2 ====
| Rank | Athlete | Nation | Time | Notes |
|---|---|---|---|---|
| 1 | Beate Schrott | Austria | 13.09 | Q |
| 2 | Eline Berings | Belgium | 13.46 | Q |
| 3 | Ivanique Kemp | Bahamas | 13.51 | Q |
| 4 | Seun Adigun | Nigeria | 13.56 | |
| 5 | Anastassiya Pilipenko | Kazakhstan | 13.77 | |
| 6 | Lecabela Quaresma | São Tomé and Príncipe | 14.56 | SB |
| —N/a | Jessica Ennis | Great Britain | —N/a | DNS |
| —N/a | Latoya Greaves | Jamaica | —N/a | DNS |

==== Heat 3 ====
| Rank | Athlete | Nation | Time | Notes |
|---|---|---|---|---|
| 1 | Kellie Wells | United States | 12.69 | Q |
| 2 | Tatyana Dektyareva | Russia | 12.87 | Q |
| 3 | Lucie Škrobáková | Czech Republic | 13.01 | Q, SB |
| 4 | Cindy Roleder | Germany | 13.06 | q |
| 5 | Shermaine Williams | Jamaica | 13.07 | q |
| 6 | Lina Florez | Colombia | 13.17 | |
| 7 | Natalya Ivoninskaya | Kazakhstan | 13.48 | |
| 8 | Marthe Koala | Burkina Faso | 13.91 | PB |

==== Heat 4 ====
| Rank | Athlete | Nation | Time | Notes |
|---|---|---|---|---|
| 1 | Dawn Harper | United States | 12.75 | Q |
| 3 | Derval O'Rourke | Ireland | 12.91 | q, SB |
| 4 | Nikkita Holder | Canada | 12.93 | q |
| 5 | Brigitte Merlano | Colombia | 13.21 | SB |
| 6 | Jung Hye-Lim | South Korea | 13.48 | |
| 7 | Jeimy Bernárdez | Honduras | 14.36 | |
| DSQ | Nevin Yanıt | Turkey | ~~12.70~~ | Q, Doping |
| DSQ | Yekaterina Galitskaya | Russia | ~~12.89~~ | Q, Doping |

==== Heat 5 ====
| Rank | Athlete | Nation | Time | Notes |
|---|---|---|---|---|
| 1 | Sally Pearson | Australia | 12.57 | Q |
| 2 | Reïna-Flor Okori | France | 13.01 | Q |
| 3 | Carolin Nytra | Germany | 13.30 | Q |
| 4 | Anastasiya Soprunova | Kazakhstan | 13.40 | |
| 5 | Sonata Tamošaitytė | Lithuania | 13.59 | |
| 6 | LaVonne Idlette | Dominican Republic | 13.60 | |
| 7 | Dipna Lim Prasad | Singapore | 14.68 | SB |
| 8 | Silvia Panguana | Mozambique | 14.68 | PB |
| —N/a | Ekaterina Poplavskaya | Belarus | —N/a | DQ |

- Ekaterina Poplavskaya ran off the track after failing to clear her fourth hurdle, and was therefore disqualified.

==== Heat 6 ====
| Rank | Athlete | Nation | Time | Notes |
|---|---|---|---|---|
| 1 | Lolo Jones | United States | 12.68 | Q, SB |
| 2 | Phylicia George | Canada | 12.83 | Q |
| 3 | Marzia Caravelli | Italy | 13.01 | Q |
| 5 | Sun Yawei | China | 13.26 | |
| 6 | Noemi Zbären | Switzerland | 13.33 | |
| 7 | Brigitte Foster-Hylton | Jamaica | 13.98 | |
| 8 | Odile Ahouanwanou | Benin | 14.76 | NR |
| 9 | Bibiana Olama | Equatorial Guinea | 16.18 | SB |
| DSQ | Yuliya Kondakova | Russia | ~~13.10~~ | q, doping |

=== Semi-finals ===
Semi-Finals Official Video

Qual. rule: first 2 of each heat (Q) plus the 2 fastest times (q) qualified.

==== Heat 1 ====
| Rank | Athlete | Nation | Time | Notes |
|---|---|---|---|---|
| 1 | Dawn Harper | United States | 12.46 | Q, PB |
| 2 | Beate Schrott | Austria | 12.83 | Q |
| 3 | Shermaine Williams | Jamaica | 12.83 | |
| 4 | Alina Talay | Belarus | 12.84 | |
| 6 | Nikkita Holder | Canada | 12.93 | |
| 7 | Carolin Nytra | Germany | 13.31 | |
| —N/a | Reïna-Flor Okori | France | DQ | |
| DSQ | Yekaterina Galitskaya | Russia | ~~12.90~~ | |

- Reïna-Flor Okori was disqualified for false starting.

==== Heat 2 ====
| Rank | Athlete | Nation | Time | Notes |
|---|---|---|---|---|
| 1 | Sally Pearson | Australia | 12.39 | Q, SB |
| 2 | Jessica Zelinka | Canada | 12.66 | Q |
| 3 | Lolo Jones | United States | 12.71 | q |
| 4 | Tiffany Porter | Great Britain | 12.79 | |
| 5 | Derval O'Rourke | Ireland | 12.91 | =SB |
| 7 | Eline Berings | Belgium | 13.26 | |
| 8 | Ivanique Kemp | Bahamas | 13.56 | |
| DSQ | Yuliya Kondakova | Russia | ~~13.13~~ | DSQ (doping) |

==== Heat 3 ====
| Rank | Athlete | Nation | Time | Notes |
|---|---|---|---|---|
| 1 | Kellie Wells | United States | 12.51 | Q, SB |
| 2 | Phylicia George | Canada | 12.65 | q, PB |
| 3 | Tatyana Dektyareva | Russia | 12.75 | SB |
| 4 | Lucie Škrobáková | Czech Republic | 12.81 | SB |
| 5 | Anne Zagré | Belgium | 12.94 | |
| 6 | Cindy Roleder | Germany | 13.02 | |
| —N/a | Marzia Caravelli | Italy | DQ | |
| DSQ | Nevin Yanıt | Turkey | ~~12.58~~ | Q, NR, Doping |

- Marzia Caravelli stopped running after failing to clear the fourth hurdle and was disqualified.

=== Final ===
Wind: −0.2 m/s

| Rank | Lanes | Athlete | Nation | Time | Notes |
|---|---|---|---|---|---|
| 1st place, gold medalist(s) | 7 | Sally Pearson | Australia | 12.35 | OR |
| 2nd place, silver medalist(s) | 4 | Dawn Harper | United States | 12.37 | PB |
| 3rd place, bronze medalist(s) | 5 | Kellie Wells | United States | 12.48 | PB |
| 4 | 2 | Lolo Jones | United States | 12.58 | SB |
| 5 | 3 | Phylicia George | Canada | 12.65 | =PB |
| 6 | 8 | Jessica Zelinka | Canada | 12.69 | |
| 7 | 9 | Beate Schrott | Austria | 13.07 | |
| DSQ | 6 | Nevin Yanıt | Turkey | ~~12.58~~ | ~~=NR~~, Doping |
