= Jeny =

Jeny may refer to:

Surname

- Rudolf Jeny (1901 – 1975), Hungarian football player and manager (also spelt as Jenny, Jeney or Jenei)

Given name

- Jeny Velazco, Mexican Paralympian athlete

Fiction

- Jeny, a character in Kiss the Girls (1965 film) played by Zoi Laskari

== See also ==
- Jeney (disambiguation)
- Jenny (disambiguation)
- Jenei (disambiguation)
