= Yenny =

Yenny may refer to:

== People ==
- Yenny Acuña (born 1997), Chilean footballer
- Yenny Sinisterra (born 2000), Colombian weightlifter
- Yenny Wahid (born 1974), Indonesian Islamic activist, journalist, and politician
- Park Ye-eun (born 1989), South Korean singer, songwriter and composer, professionally known as Yenny

== Other uses ==
- Yenny, a comic series by David Álvarez (artist)

== See also ==
- Jenny (disambiguation)
