= 2011 Asian Athletics Championships – Women's 100 metres hurdles =

The women's 100 metres hurdles at the 2011 Asian Athletics Championships was held at the Kobe Universiade Memorial Stadium on 10 July.

== Medalists ==
Gold	Silver	Bronze
Sun Yawei; China	Jung Hye-lim; South Korea	Natalya Ivoninskaya; Kazakhstan

== Results ==
=== Heats ===
First 3 in each heat (Q) and the next 2 best performers (q) advanced to the final.

Wind:
Heat 1: –0.8 m/s, Heat 2: –0.6 m/s

Rank	Heat	Name	Nationality	Time	Notes
1	2	Natalya Ivoninskaya	Kazakhstan	13.15	Q, SB
2	2	Wu Shuijiao	China	13.23	Q
3	2	Jung Hye-lim	South Korea	13.25	Q
4	1	Sun Yawei	China	13.43	Q
5	1	Anastassiya Soprunova	Kazakhstan	13.45	Q
6	1	Dedeh Erawati	Indonesia	13.47	Q
7	1	Ayako Kimura	Japan	13.48	q
8	2	Airi Ito	Japan	13.50	q
9	2	Wallapa Punsoongneun	Thailand	13.86	
10	1	Lim Dipna	Singapore	14.53	
11	2	Sumita Sumita Rani	Bangladesh	16.82	
	1	Poon Pak Yan	Hong Kong	DNF	

=== Final ===
Wind: –0.9 m/s

Rank	Lane	Name	Nationality	Time	Notes
1st place, gold medalist(s)	4	Sun Yawei	China	13.04	
2nd place, silver medalist(s)	9	Jung Hye-lim	South Korea	13.11	
3rd place, bronze medalist(s)	7	Natalya Ivoninskaya	Kazakhstan	13.15	=SB
4	2	Ayako Kimura	Japan	13.26	
5	6	Anastassiya Soprunova	Kazakhstan	13.32	
6	8	Dedeh Erawati	Indonesia	13.42	
7	5	Wu Shuijiao	China	13.51	
8	3	Airi Ito	Japan	13.55	
