= Jenei =

Jenei is a surname. It may refer to:

- Emerich Jenei (1937–2025), Romanian football player and coach
- Ileana Gyulai-Drîmbă-Jenei (1946–2021), Romanian fencer
- László Jenei (1923–2006), Hungarian water polo player
- Rudolf Jenei (1901–1975), Hungarian football player and manager

== See also ==
- Jeny (disambiguation)
- Jeney, a Hungarian surname
- Jenny (disambiguation)
