= Athletics at the 2010 Asian Games – Women's 100 metres hurdles =

Asian Games Event for Women

Women's 100 metres hurdles at the 2010 Asian Games
- Venue: Aoti Main Stadium
- Dates: 24–25 November 2010
- Competitors: 10 from 7 nations

Medalists
gold medal	Lee Yeon-kyung	South Korea
silver medal	Natalya Ivoninskaya	Kazakhstan
bronze medal	Sun Yawei	China

The women's 100 metres hurdles event at the 2010 Asian Games was held at the Aoti Main Stadium, Guangzhou, China on 24–25 November.

== Schedule ==
All times are China Standard Time (UTC+08:00)

Date	Time	Event
Wednesday, 24 November 2010	17:10	Round 1
Thursday, 25 November 2010	17:05	Final

== Records ==
Prior to this competition, the existing world, Asian and Games records were as follows.

World Record	Yordanka Donkova (BUL)	12.21	Stara Zagora, Bulgaria	20 August 1988
Asian Record	Olga Shishigina (KAZ)	12.44	Lucerne, Switzerland	27 June 1995
Games Record	Olga Shishigina (KAZ)	12.63	Bangkok, Thailand	19 December 1998

== Results ==
Legend

- DNS — Did not start

=== Round 1 ===
- Qualification: First 3 in each heat (Q) and the next 2 fastest (q) advance to the final.

==== Heat 1 ====
- Wind: +0.9 m/s

Rank	Athlete	Time	Notes
1	Sun Yawei (CHN)	13.15	Q
2	Natalya Ivoninskaya (KAZ)	13.22	Q
3	Lee Yeon-kyung (KOR)	13.22	Q
4	Wallapa Punsoongneun (THA)	13.38	q
5	Rena Joshita (JPN)	13.43	q

==== Heat 2 ====
- Wind: +1.3 m/s

Rank	Athlete	Time	Notes
1	Asuka Terada (JPN)	13.17	Q
2	Dedeh Erawati (INA)	13.20	Q
3	Anastassiya Soprunova (KAZ)	13.22	Q
4	Jung Hye-lim (KOR)	13.57	
—	Fatmata Fofanah (BRN)	DNS	

=== Final ===
- Wind: 0.0 m/s

Rank	Athlete	Time	Notes
1st place, gold medalist(s)	Lee Yeon-kyung (KOR)	13.23	
2nd place, silver medalist(s)	Natalya Ivoninskaya (KAZ)	13.24	
3rd place, bronze medalist(s)	Sun Yawei (CHN)	13.27	
4	Anastassiya Soprunova (KAZ)	13.28	
5	Asuka Terada (JPN)	13.29	
6	Dedeh Erawati (INA)	13.42	
7	Wallapa Punsoongneun (THA)	13.59	
—	Rena Joshita (JPN)	DNS	
