= 2009 Asian Athletics Championships – Women's 100 metres hurdles =

The women's 100 metres hurdles event at the 2009 Asian Athletics Championships was held at the Guangdong Olympic Stadium on November 10–11.

== Medalists ==
| Gold | Silver | Bronze |
|---|---|---|
| Sun Yawei; China | Asuka Terada; Japan | Dedeh Erawati; Indonesia |

== Results ==
=== Heats ===
Wind: Heat 1: -0.5 m/s, Heat 2: -0.1 m/s

| Rank | Heat | Name | Nationality | Time | Notes |
|---|---|---|---|---|---|
| 1 | 1 | Sun Yawei | China | 13.32 | Q |
| 2 | 1 | Dedeh Erawati | Indonesia | 13.34 | Q |
| 3 | 2 | Fatmata Fofanah | Bahrain | 13.39 | Q |
| 4 | 2 | Mami Ishino | Japan | 13.41 | Q |
| 5 | 1 | Asuka Terada | Japan | 13.47 | Q |
| 6 | 1 | Natalya Ivoninskaya | Kazakhstan | 13.76 | q |
| 7 | 1 | Chung Hye-rim | South Korea | 13.76 | q |
| 8 | 2 | Anastassya Soprunova | Kazakhstan | 13.89 | Q |
| 9 | 2 | Han Kyong Ae | North Korea | 14.34 | |
| 10 | 2 | Agustina Bawele | Indonesia | 14.61 | |
| | 2 | Sumita Rani | Bangladesh | DNS | |

=== Final ===
Wind: +0.5 m/s

| Rank | Lane | Name | Nationality | Time | Notes |
|---|---|---|---|---|---|
| 1st place, gold medalist(s) | 6 | Sun Yawei | China | 13.19 | |
| 2nd place, silver medalist(s) | 7 | Asuka Terada | Japan | 13.20 | |
| 3rd place, bronze medalist(s) | 4 | Dedeh Erawati | Indonesia | 13.32 | |
| 4 | 3 | Mami Ishino | Japan | 13.39 | |
| 5 | 2 | Chung Hye-rim | South Korea | 13.52 | |
| 6 | 5 | Fatmata Fofanah | Bahrain | 13.63 | |
| 7 | 1 | Natalya Ivoninskaya | Kazakhstan | 13.65 | F1 |
| 8 | 8 | Anastassya Soprunova | Kazakhstan | 13.94 | |
