= 2006 World Junior Championships in Athletics – Women's 100 metres hurdles =

The women's 100 metres hurdles event at the 2006 World Junior Championships in Athletics was held in Beijing, China, at Chaoyang Sports Centre on 17 and 18 August.

== Medalists ==
Gold	Yekaterina Shtepa; Russia
Silver	Christina Vukicevic; Norway
Bronze	Tiffany Ofili; United States

== Results ==
=== Final ===
18 August
Wind: 0.0 m/s

Rank	Name	Nationality	Time	Notes
1st place, gold medalist(s)	Yekaterina Shtepa	Russia	13.33	
2nd place, silver medalist(s)	Christina Vukicevic	Norway	13.34	
3rd place, bronze medalist(s)	Tiffany Ofili	United States	13.37	
4	Aleksandra Fedoriva	Russia	13.57	
5	Zara Hohn	United Kingdom	13.62	
6	Natasha Ruddock	Jamaica	13.82	
7	Kettiany Clarke	Jamaica	14.00	
	Shalina Clarke	United States	DNF	

=== Semifinals ===
18 August

==== Semifinal 1 ====
Wind: -1.6 m/s

Rank	Name	Nationality	Time	Notes
1	Christina Vukicevic	Norway	13.45	Q
2	Kettiany Clarke	Jamaica	13.72	Q
3	Anna Plotitsyna	Ukraine	13.91	
4	Nikkita Holder	Canada	13.94	
5	Yekaterina Poplavskaya	Belarus	13.96	
6	Kierre Beckles	Barbados	14.04	
7	Emilia Rundqvist	Sweden	14.49	
	Annimari Korte	Finland	DNF	

==== Semifinal 2 ====
Wind: -0.3 m/s

Rank	Name	Nationality	Time	Notes
1	Aleksandra Fedoriva	Russia	13.60	Q
2	Shalina Clarke	United States	13.70	Q
3	Anne-Kathrin Elbe	Germany	13.80	
4	Arna Erega	Croatia	13.88	
5	Manuela Galtier	France	14.02	
6	Erika Kleynhans	South Africa	14.24	
7	Jenni Hucul	Canada	14.35	
	Giia Lindström	Finland	DQ	

==== Semifinal 3 ====
Wind: -1.7 m/s

Rank	Name	Nationality	Time	Notes
1	Tiffany Ofili	United States	13.47	Q
2	Yekaterina Shtepa	Russia	13.57	Q
3	Zara Hohn	United Kingdom	13.71	q
4	Natasha Ruddock	Jamaica	13.71	q
5	Nadine Hildebrand	Germany	13.95	
6	Jung Hye-lim	South Korea	14.12	
7	Jiang Yanhua	China	14.20	
8	Kim Reuland	Luxembourg	14.68	

=== Heats ===
17 August

==== Heat 1 ====
Wind: +1.1 m/s

Rank	Name	Nationality	Time	Notes
1	Tiffany Ofili	United States	13.68	Q
2	Anna Plotitsyna	Ukraine	13.73	Q
3	Manuela Galtier	France	14.06	Q
4	Kierre Beckles	Barbados	14.07	Q
5	Emilia Rundqvist	Sweden	14.11	q
6	Urska Ozimek	Slovenia	14.49	
7	Tara Holt	Australia	14.50	
8	Aiganysh Asanalieva	Kyrgyzstan	14.61	
	Sonata Tamošaitytė	Lithuania	DQ	

==== Heat 2 ====
Wind: +0.5 m/s

Rank	Name	Nationality	Time	Notes
1	Christina Vukicevic	Norway	13.51	Q
2	Shalina Clarke	United States	13.86	Q
3	Annimari Korte	Finland	13.93	Q
4	Nikkita Holder	Canada	13.97	Q
5	Erika Kleynhans	South Africa	14.07	q
6	Zhang Hongpei	China	14.15	
7	Sara Balduchelli	Italy	14.47	
8	Veronica Torr	New Zealand	14.83	

==== Heat 3 ====
Wind: +0.5 m/s

Rank	Name	Nationality	Time	Notes
1	Anne-Kathrin Elbe	Germany	13.56	Q
2	Kettiany Clarke	Jamaica	13.58	Q
3	Arna Erega	Croatia	13.68	Q
4	Zara Hohn	United Kingdom	13.90	Q
5	Jenni Hucul	Canada	14.08	q
6	Jung Hye-lim	South Korea	14.08	q
7	Anne Møller	Denmark	14.12	
8	Clélia Reuse	Switzerland	14.14	

==== Heat 4 ====
Wind: +0.8 m/s

Rank	Name	Nationality	Time	Notes
1	Yekaterina Shtepa	Russia	13.51	Q
2	Natasha Ruddock	Jamaica	13.73	Q
3	Yekaterina Poplavskaya	Belarus	13.74	Q
4	Giia Lindström	Finland	13.84	Q
5	Kimberly Stanford	Barbados	14.15	
6	Ana Torrijos	Spain	14.18	
7	Elena Radu	Romania	14.24	
8	Karla Dueñas	Mexico	14.54	

==== Heat 5 ====
Wind: +0.1 m/s

Rank	Name	Nationality	Time	Notes
1	Aleksandra Fedoriva	Russia	13.60	Q
2	Nadine Hildebrand	Germany	13.80	Q
3	Kim Reuland	Luxembourg	14.01	Q
4	Jiang Yanhua	China	14.08	Q
5	Claudia Rileose	France	14.13	
6	Marie Hagle	Norway	14.13	
7	Maja Petan	Slovenia	14.29	
8	Natalya Asanova	Uzbekistan	14.48	

== Participation ==
According to an unofficial count, 41 athletes from 30 countries participated in the event.

- Australia (1)
- Barbados (2)
- Belarus (1)
- Canada (2)
- China (2)
- Croatia (1)
- Denmark (1)
- Finland (2)
- France (2)
- Germany (2)
- Italy (1)
- Jamaica (2)
- Kyrgyzstan (1)
- Lithuania (1)
- Luxembourg (1)
- Mexico (1)
- New Zealand (1)
- Norway (2)
- Romania (1)
- Russia (2)
- Slovenia (2)
- South Africa (1)
- South Korea (1)
- Spain (1)
- Sweden (1)
- Switzerland (1)
- Ukraine (1)
- United Kingdom (1)
- United States (2)
- Uzbekistan (1)
