= 2007 Asian Athletics Championships – Women's 100 metres hurdles =

The women's 100 metres hurdles event at the 2007 Asian Athletics Championships was held in Amman, Jordan on July 27.

== Results ==
Wind: +1.9 m/s

Rank	Lane	Name	Nationality	Time	Notes
1st place, gold medalist(s)	4	Mami Ishino	Japan	13.26	
2nd place, silver medalist(s)	5	He Liyuan	China	13.31	
3rd place, bronze medalist(s)	3	Lee Yeon-Kyoung	South Korea	13.50	
4	6	Moh Siew Wei	Malaysia	13.68	
5	2	Sheena Atilano	Philippines	13.78	
6	8	Fadwa Al-Bouza	Syria	14.31	
7	7	Han Kyong-Ae	North Korea	14.96	
8	1	Erawati Dedeh	Indonesia	27.73	
