= Jennie =

Jennie may refer to:

== People ==
- Jennie (given name) or Jenny, a female given name
- Jennie (singer), South Korean singer

== Arts and entertainment ==
- Jennie (film), a 1940 American drama film
- Jennie (musical), a 1963 Broadway production
- Jennie (novel), a 1994 science fiction thriller by Douglas Preston
- Jennie: Lady Randolph Churchill, a 1974 British television serial
- Jennie, a 1969/1971 two-volume biography of Lady Randolph Churchill by Ralph G. Martin
- "Jennie", a 2018 song by Felix Jaehn, featuring R. City and Bori, from I (Felix Jaehn album)
- "Jennie", a 2023 song by the Lottery Winners from Anxiety Replacement Therapy

== Places in the United States ==
- Jennie, Arkansas
- Jennie, Georgia
- Jennie, Minnesota

== See also ==
- Jenni
- Jenny (disambiguation)
