= Rena Joshita =

Japanese hurdler

Personal information
- Nationality: Japanese
- Born: 2 April 1986 (age 40) Kanagawa Prefecture, Japan
- Education: Aoyama Gakuin University
- Height: 1.68 m (5 ft 6 in)
- Weight: 50 kg (110 lb)

Sport
- Country: Japan
- Sport: Track and field
- Event: 100 m hurdles

Achievements and titles
- Personal best: 13.25 (Marugame 2010)

Rena Joshita (城下 麗奈, Jōshita Rena; born 2 April 1986) is a retired Japanese hurdler. She reached the final of the 2010 Asian Games in the 100 metres hurdles. She was also the former Japanese university record holder (13.26 seconds, set in 2009) in the 100 metres hurdles.

== Personal best ==
Event	Time (s)	Competition	Venue	Date
100 m hurdles	13.25 (wind: +1.9 m/s)	Japanese Championships	Marugame, Japan	5 June 2010

== International competition ==
Year	Competition	Venue	Position	Event	Time	Notes
Representing Japan
2004	Asian Junior Championships	Ipoh, Malaysia	6th	100 m hurdles	14.34	
2010	Asian Games	Guangzhou, China	—	100 m hurdles	DNS	8th (h): 13.43 (wind: +0.9 m/s)
