= Anastasiya Soprunova =

Kazakhstani hurdler (born 1986)

Medal record

Women's athletics

Representing Kazakhstan

Asian Indoor Championships
Gold medal – first place	2016 Doha	60 m hurdles
Silver medal – second place	2008 Doha	60 m hurdles
Silver medal – second place	2014 Hangzhou	60 m hurdles

Anastasiya Soprunova (born 14 January 1986 in Ust Kamenogorsk) is a Kazakhstani hurdler. At the 2012 Summer Olympics, she competed in the Women's 100 metres hurdles.

== Competition record ==
Year	Competition	Venue	Position	Event	Notes
Representing Kazakhstan
2003	World Youth Championships	Sherbrooke, Canada	20th (h)	100 m hurdles	14.35
2008	Asian Indoor Championships	Doha, Qatar	2nd	60 m hurdles	8.34
2009	Universiade	Belgrade, Serbia	11th (sf)	100 m hurdles	13.55
2009	Asian Indoor Games	Hanoi, Vietnam	3rd	60 m hurdles	8.39
2009	Asian Championships	Guangzhou, China	8th	100 m hurdles	13.94
2010	Asian Games	Guangzhou, China	4th	100 m hurdles	13.28
2011	Asian Championships	Kobe, Japan	5th	100 m hurdles	13.32
2011	Universiade	Shenzhen, China	14th (sf)	100 m hurdles	13.43
2011	World Championships	Daegu, South Korea	30th (h)	100 m hurdles	13.43
2012	Asian Indoor Championships	Hangzhou, China	5th	60 m hurdles	8.47
2012	Olympic Games	London, United Kingdom	28th (h)	100 m hurdles	14.35
2013	Asian Championships	Pune, India	2nd	100 m hurdles	13.44
2013	World Championships	Moscow, Russia	35th (h)	100 m hurdles	13.85
2016	Asian Indoor Championships	Doha, Qatar	1st	60 m hurdles	8.17
