= Ayako Kimura =

Japanese hurdler (born 1988)

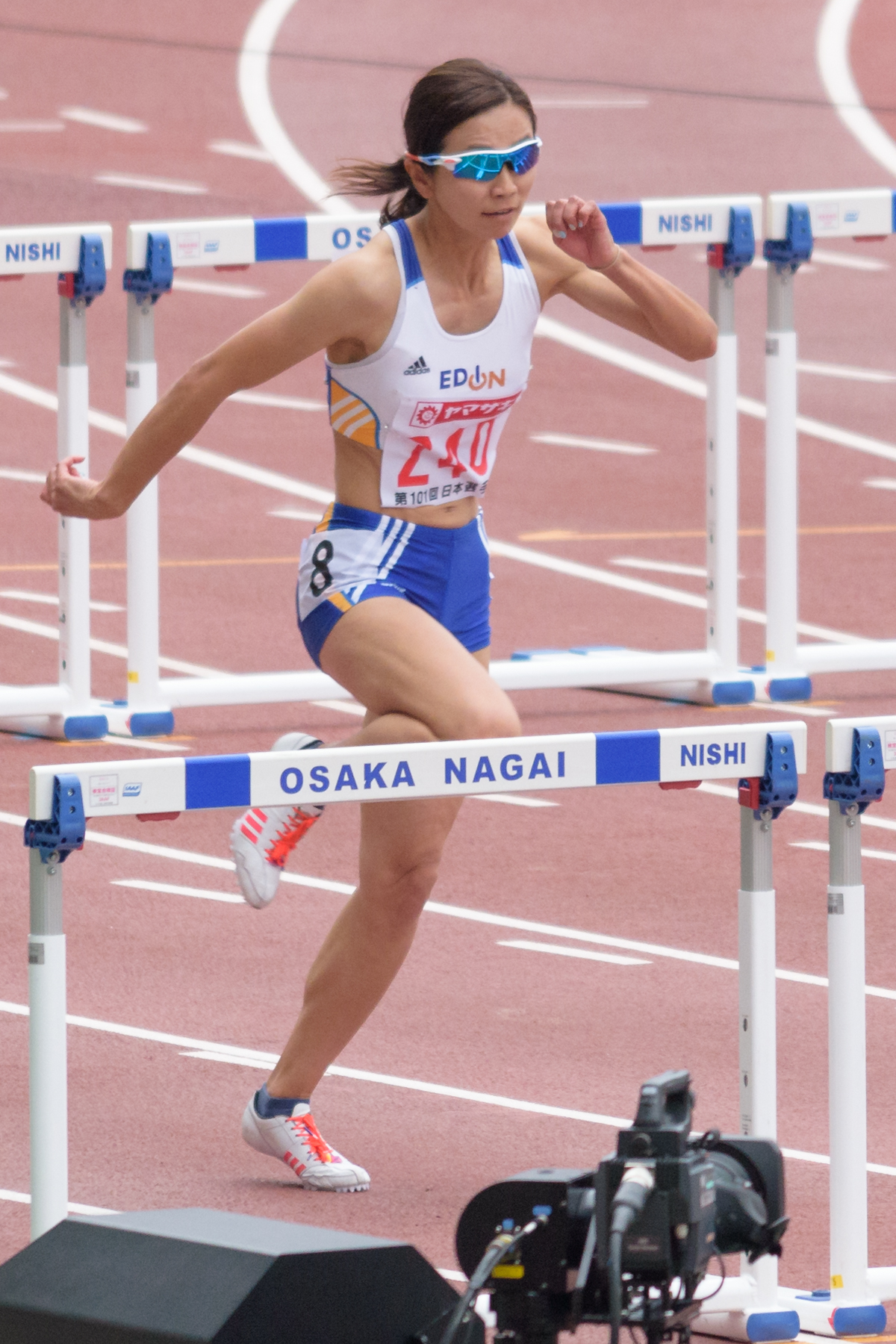
- Kimura at the 2017 Japan Championships

Personal information
- Born: 11 June 1988 (age 38) Hiroshima, Japan
- Education: Yokohama National University
- Height: 168 cm (5 ft 6 in)
- Weight: 52 kg (115 lb)

Sport
- Sport: Athletics
- Event(s): 100 m hurdles, 200 m
- Club: Edion, Hiroshima
- Coached by: Manabu Kawagoe

Achievements and titles
- Personal best(s): 200 m – 25.00 (2017); 100 mH – 13.03 (2013)
Medal record
Women's athletics
Representing Japan
Asian Games
Bronze medal – third place	2014 Incheon	100 metres hurdles
Asian Championships
Gold medal – first place	2013 Pune	100 metres hurdles
Bronze medal – third place	2015 Wuhan	100 metres hurdles
Silver medal – second place	2017 Bhubaneswar	100 metres hurdles
Gold medal – first place	2019 Doha	100 metres hurdles

Ayako Kimura (木村 文子, Kimura Ayako; born 11 June 1988) is a Japanese hurdler. She competed at the 2012 Summer Olympics in the 100 meter hurdles, and failed to reach the final. She won a gold, a bronze and a silver medal in this event at the Asian championships in 2013, 2015 and 2017, respectively.

== Competition record ==
Year	Competition	Venue	Position	Event	Notes
Representing Japan
2011	Asian Championships	Kobe, Japan	4th	100 m hurdles	13.26
2012	Olympic Games	London, United Kingdom	37th (h)	100 m hurdles	13.75
2013	Asian Championships	Pune, India	1st	100 m hurdles	13.25
2014	Continental Cup	Marrakesh, Morocco	6th	100 m hurdles	13.17
2014	Asian Games	Incheon, South Korea	3rd	100 m hurdles	13.25
2015	Asian Championships	Wuhan, China	3rd	100 m hurdles	13.41
2017	Asian Championships	Bhubaneswar, India	2nd	100 m hurdles	13.30
2017	World Championships	London, United Kingdom	23rd (sf)	100 m hurdles	13.29
2019	Asian Championships	Doha, Qatar	1st	100 m hurdles	13.13
2019	World Championships	Doha, Qatar	28th (h)	100 m hurdles	13.19
2021	Olympic Games	Tokyo, Japan	34th (h)	100 m hurdles	13.25
