= Valentina Kibalnikova =

Uzbekistani hurdler (born 1990)

Personal information
- Born: 16 October 1990 (age 35) Tashkent, Uzbek SSR, Soviet Union
- Height: 1.74 m (5 ft 9 in)
- Weight: 56 kg (123 lb)

Sport
- Sport: Athletics
- Events: 100 m hurdles, 60 m hurdles
Medal record
Women's athletics
Representing Uzbekistan
Asian Indoor Championships
Bronze medal – third place	2016 Doha	60 m hurdles

Valentina Sergeyevna Kibalnikova (Uzbek: Валентина Сергеевна Кибальникова; born 16 October 1990) is an Uzbekistani athlete competing in the sprint hurdles. She represented her country at the 2016 Summer Olympics without advancing from the first round.

Her personal bests are 13.00 seconds in the 100 metres hurdles (-0.2 m/s, Almaty 2016) and 8.32 seconds in the 60 metres hurdles (Doha 2016). The first is the current national records.

== International competitions ==
Year	Competition	Venue	Position	Event	Notes
Representing Uzbekistan
2007	World Youth Championships	Ostrava, Czech Republic	29th (h)	100 m hurdles (76.2 cm)	14.39
2014	Asian Games	Incheon, South Korea	5th	100 m hurdles	13.47
2015	Asian Championships	Wuhan, China	9th (h)	100 m hurdles	13.82
2016	Asian Indoor Championships	Doha, Qatar	3rd	60 m hurdles	8.32
2016	Olympic Games	Rio de Janeiro, Brazil	39th (h)	100 m hurdles	13.29
2017	Asian Championships	Bhubaneswar, India	4th	100 m hurdles	13.51
2017	Asian Indoor and Martial Arts Games	Ashgabat, Turkmenistan	4th	60 m hurdles	8.61
2023	Asian Indoor Championships	Astana, Kazakhstan	–	60 m hurdles	DNF
