= Kellie Wells (athlete) =

American hurdler (born 1982)

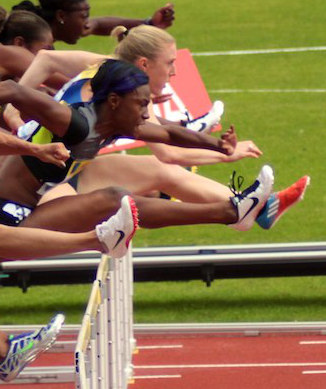

Personal information
- Nationality: United States
- Born: July 16, 1982 (age 44) Richmond, Virginia
- Height: 5 ft 4 in (1.63 m)
- Weight: 126 lb (57 kg)
- Spouse: Jasper Brinkley

Sport
- College team: Hampton University
- Coached by: Dennis Mitchell

Achievements and titles
- Personal best: 100 m hurdles 12.48 (-0.2 m/s) (London 2012)
Medal record
Women's athletics
Representing the United States
Olympic Games
Bronze medal – third place	2012 London	100 m hurdles

Kellie Wells-Brinkley, née Kellie Wells, (July 16, 1982) is an American track and field athlete who specialises in the 100 metres hurdles. She won an Olympic bronze medal at the London 2012, setting a personal best in the process.

== Personal ==
As a high school sophomore at James River High School in Chesterfield, Virginia, Wells left home after her mother's fiancé raped her. Her mother and stepfather were killed in a car accident a month later.

In December 2015, Wells and her husband, New York Giants linebacker Jasper Brinkley, had a son.

Wells and LaVonne Idlette appeared on The Amazing Race 32 and placed tenth. Wells discussed having dyslexia on the show.

== Achievements ==
- 2011 US National 100 metres Hurdles Champion ( 2nd in 2010, 2012 )

Year	Competition	Venue	Position	Event	Notes
Representing United States
2011	World Championships	Daegu, South Korea	—	100 meter hurdles	DNF
2012	Olympic Games	London, United Kingdom	3rd	100 meter hurdles	12.48

In the 2011 World Championship final, Wells fell after hitting the seventh hurdle and failed to finish.
