= Jung Hye-lim =

South Korean hurdler (born 1987)

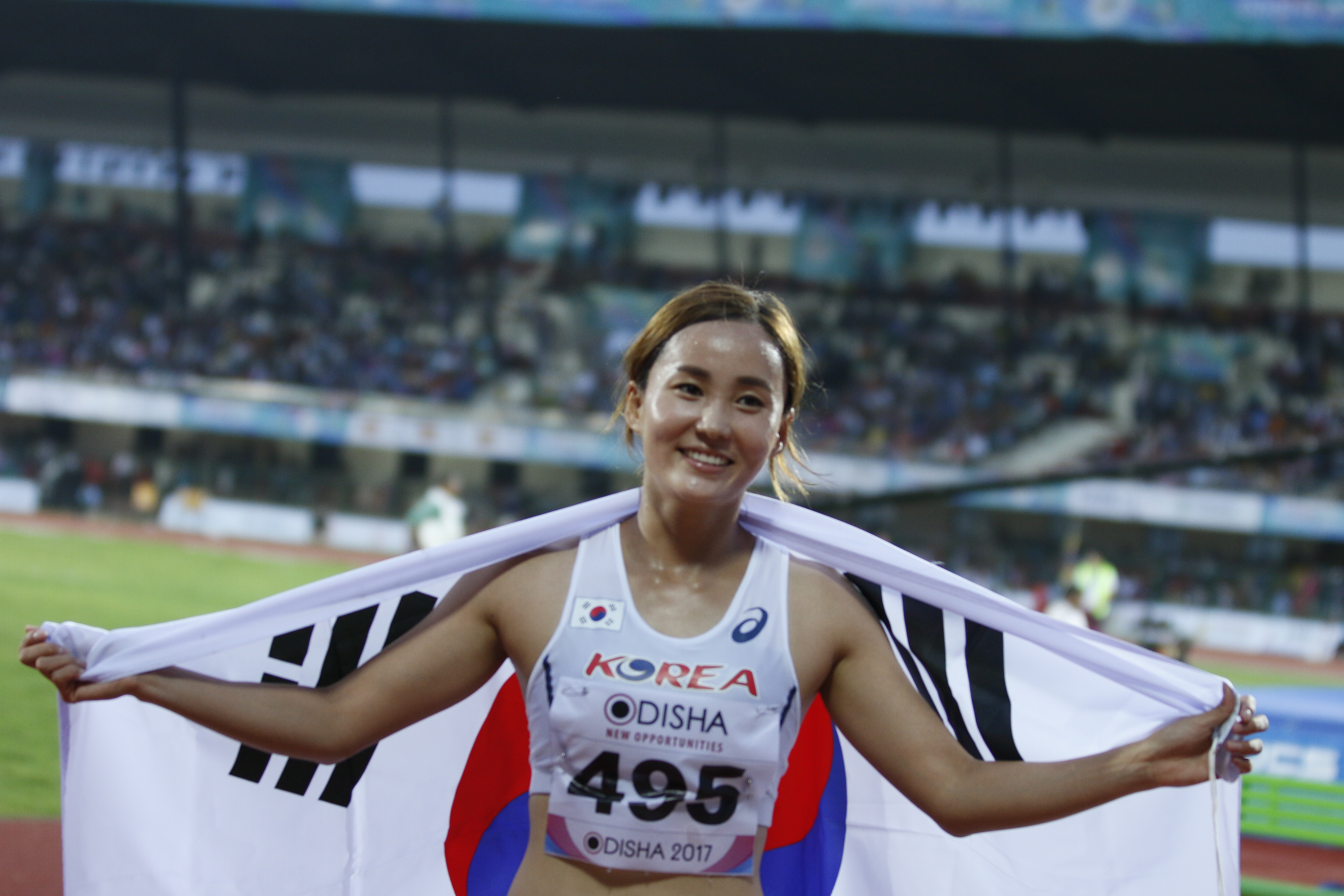
- Born: 1 July 1987 (age 38); Busan, South Korea
- Occupation: Hurdler

Korean name
- Hangul: 정혜림
- RR: Jeong Hyerim
- MR: Chŏng Hyerim

Jung Hye-lim (Korean: 정혜림; born 1 July 1987) is a South Korean hurdler. At the 2012 Summer Olympics, she competed in the Women's 100 metres hurdles. In her home country, she was nicknamed "the eoljjang hurdler" for her pretty appearance.

== Competition record ==
Year	Competition	Venue	Position	Event	Notes
Representing South Korea
2005	Asian Indoor Games	Pattaya, Thailand	5th	60 m hurdles	8.81
2006	World Junior Championships	Beijing, China	17th (sf)	100 m hurdles	14.12
2009	East Asian Games	Hong Kong, China	4th	100 m hurdles	13.61
2010	Asian Games	Guangzhou, China	9th (h)	100 m hurdles	13.57
2011	Asian Championships	Kobe, Japan	2nd	100 m hurdles	13.11
2011	World Championships	Daegu, South Korea	40th (h)	100 m	11.87
2011	World Championships	Daegu, South Korea	28th (h)	100 m hurdles	13.39
2012	Olympic Games	London, United Kingdom	30th (h)	100 m hurdles	13.48
2013	East Asian Games	Tianjin, China	3rd	100 m hurdles	13.41
2014	Asian Games	Incheon, South Korea	4th	100 m hurdles	13.39
2015	Asian Championships	Wuhan, China	6th	100 m hurdles	13.54
2017	Asian Championships	Bhubaneswar, India	1st	100 m hurdles	13.16
2017	World Championships	London, United Kingdom	34th (h)	100 m hurdles	13.37
2018	Asian Games	Jakarta, Indonesia	1st	100 m hurdles	13.20
2018	Asian Games	Jakarta, Indonesia	11th (h)	4 × 100 m relay	46.04
2019	Asian Championships	Doha, Qatar	7th	100 m hurdles	13.50
