= 2017 Asian Athletics Championships – Women's 100 metres hurdles =

The women's 100 metres hurdles at the 2017 Asian Athletics Championships was held on 8 July.

== Medalists ==
Gold	Jung Hye-lim; South Korea
Silver	Ayako Kimura; Japan
Bronze	Wang Dou; China

== Results ==
=== Heats ===
Qualification rule: First 3 in each heat (Q) and the next 2 fastest (q) qualified for the final.

Wind:
Heat 1: +0.1 m/s, Heat 2: +0.8 m/s

Rank	Heat	Name	Nationality	Time	Notes
1	1	Jung Hye-lim	South Korea	13.16	Q
2	1	Hitomi Shimura	Japan	13.38	Q
3	2	Ayako Kimura	Japan	13.55	Q
4	2	Valentina Kibalnikova	Uzbekistan	13.56	Q
5	2	Wang Dou	China	13.56	Q
6	1	Anastassiya Vinogradova	Kazakhstan	13.62	Q
7	2	Lui Lai Yiu	Hong Kong	13.79	q
8	1	Aigerim Shynazbekova	Kazakhstan	13.88	q
9	2	Hsieh Hsi-en	Chinese Taipei	13.89	
10	1	Nayana James	India	14.45	

=== Final ===
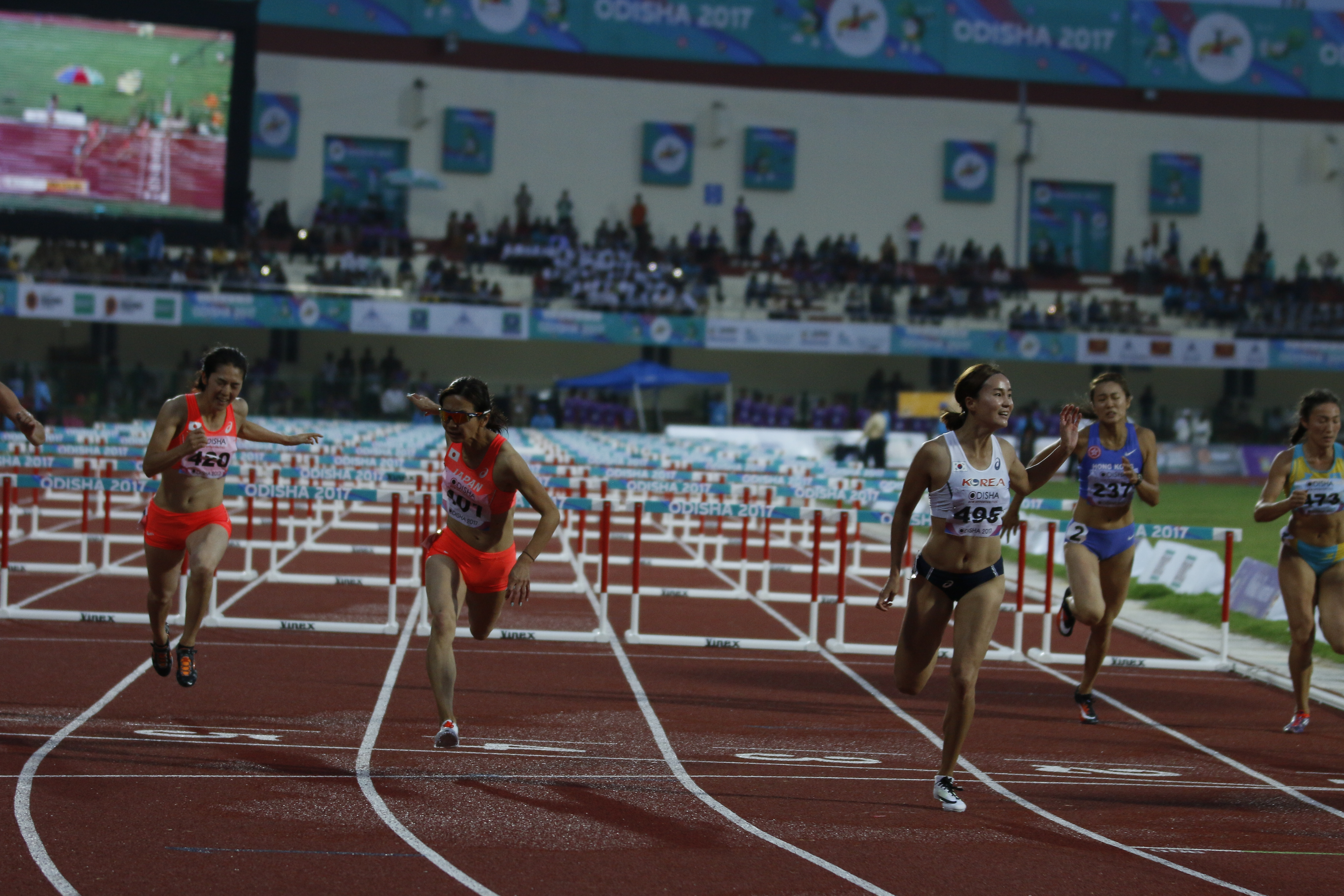
The final

Wind: -0.1 m/s

Rank	Heat	Name	Nationality	Time	Notes
1st place, gold medalist(s)	3	Jung Hye-lim	South Korea	13.16	
2nd place, silver medalist(s)	4	Ayako Kimura	Japan	13.30	
3rd place, bronze medalist(s)	7	Wang Dou	China	13.36	
4	6	Valentina Kibalnikova	Uzbekistan	13.51	
5	5	Hitomi Shimura	Japan	13.59	
6	8	Anastassiya Vinogradova	Kazakhstan	13.59	
7	2	Lui Lai Yiu	Hong Kong	13.89	
8	1	Aigerim Shynazbekova	Kazakhstan	13.93	
