= Hitomi Shimura =

Japanese hurdler

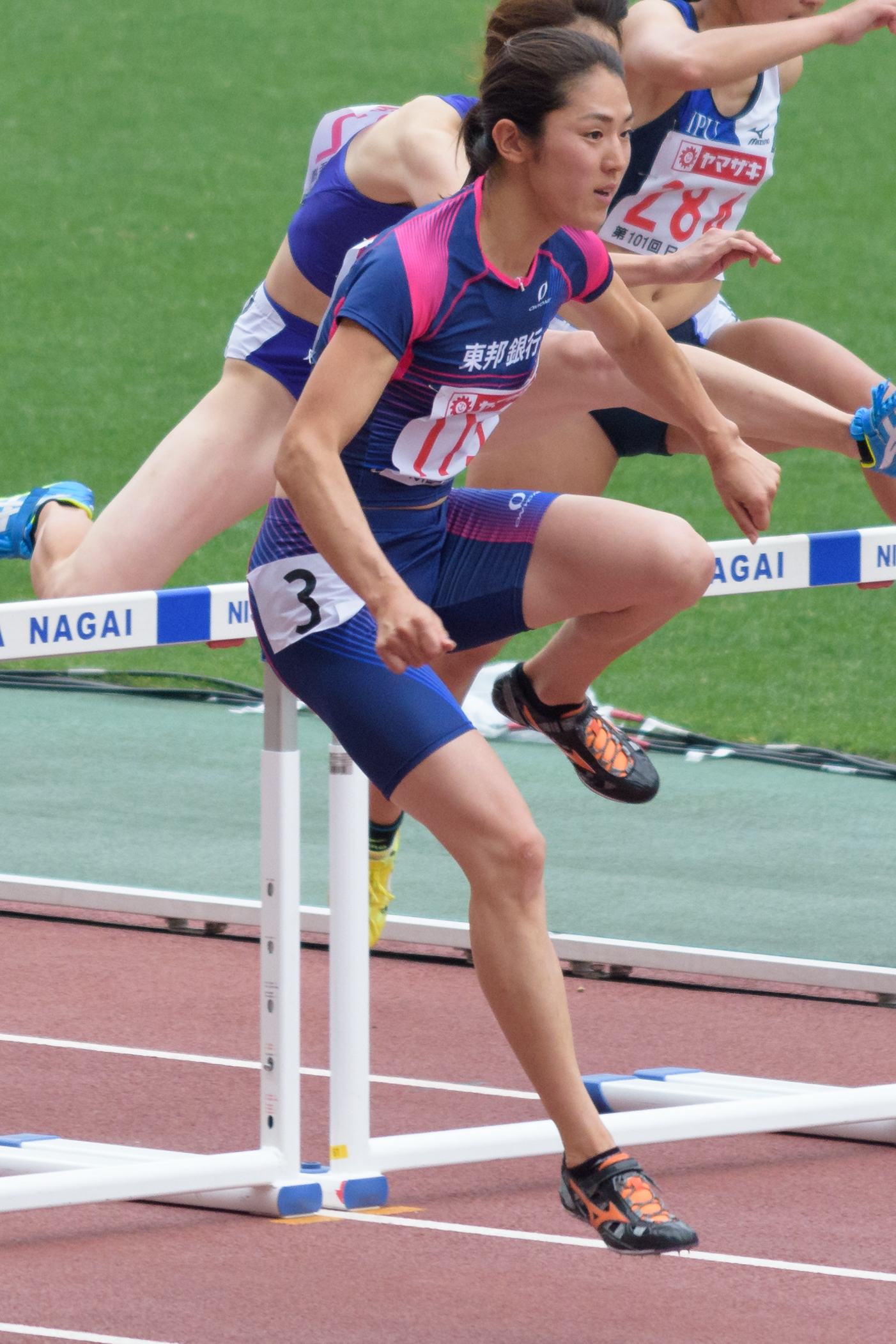
- Hitomi Shimura in 2017

Personal information
- Nationality: Japanese
- Born: 8 November 1990 (age 35) Tosu, Saga, Japan
- Education: Waseda University
- Height: 1.67 m (5 ft 6 in)
- Weight: 56 kg (123 lb)

Sport
- Country: Japan
- Sport: Hurdling
- Event: 100 metres hurdles
- Club: Toho Bank
- Personal best(s): 100 m: 11.85 (2015) 200 m: 24.01 (2012) 100 m hurdles: 13.02 (2013)

Hitomi Shimura (紫村 仁美, Shimura Hitomi; born 8 November 1990) is a Japanese hurdler. She competed in the women's 100 metres hurdles at the 2017 World Championships in Athletics.

== Personal bests ==
Event	Time	Competition	Venue	Date	Notes
100 m	11.85 (+1.8 m/s)	Spring Junior Meet	Saga, Japan	11 April 2015	
200 m	24.01 (-0.1 m/s)	Shizuoka International meet	Fukuroi, Japan	3 May 2012	
100 m hurdles	13.02 (-0.6 m/s)	Japanese Championships	Chōfu, Japan	8 June 2013	
4 × 200 m relay	1:35.36 (relay leg: 1st) (Note: Toho Bank team, with teammates Asami Chiba, Sayaka Aoki and Mayumi Watanabe)	Fukushima Relays	Fukushima, Japan	17 October 2015	Former NR (Note: record was broken by national team in 2019)

=== National university record holder ===
Event	Time	Competition	Venue	Date	Notes
100 m hurdles	13.15 (+1.7 m/s)	Mikio Oda Memorial	Hiroshima, Japan	29 April 2012	

== International competition ==
Year	Competition	Venue	Position	Event	Time (s)	Notes
Representing Japan
2013	Asian Championships	Pune, India	— (f)	100 m hurdles	DQ	(Note: 2nd (h): 13.60 (wind: -0.2 m/s))
2013	World Championships	Moscow, Russia	34th (h)	100 m hurdles	13.72 (wind: -0.5 m/s)	
2015	Asian Championships	Wuhan, China	5th	100 m hurdles	13.48 (wind: -0.4 m/s)	
2015	DécaNation	Paris, France	6th	100 m hurdles	14.01 (wind: -0.5 m/s)	
2017	Asian Championships	Bhubaneswar, India	5th	100 m hurdles	13.59 (wind: -0.1 m/s)	
2017	World Championships	London, United Kingdom	31st (h)	100 m hurdles	13.29 (wind: -0.6 m/s)	
2018	Asian Games	Jakarta, Indonesia	7th	100 m hurdles	13.74 (wind: +0.2 m/s)	

== National titles ==
- Japanese Championships
  - 100 m hurdles: 2013, 2015
  - 4 × 100 m relay: 2020
  - 4 × 400 m relay: 2020
