= Anastassiya Vinogradova =

Kazakhstani hurdler

Anastassiya Pilipenko
Personal information
- Born: 13 September 1986 (age 39) Alma-Ata, Kazakh SSR, Soviet Union
- Education: Specialised Higher Sports School
- Height: 1.74 m (5 ft 9 in)
- Weight: 55 kg (121 lb)

Sport
- Sport: Athletics
- Event: 100 metres hurdles
- Coached by: Oleg Vinogradov
Medal record
Women's athletics
Representing Kazakhstan
Asian Indoor Championships
Silver medal – second place	2016 Doha	60 m hurdles

Anastassiya Olegovna Pilipenko (Russian: Анастасия Олеговна Пилипенко; née Vinogradova; born 13 September 1986 in Alma-Ata, Kazakh S.S.R.) is a Kazakhstani hurdler. At the 2012 Summer Olympics, she competed in the Women's 100 metres hurdles.

Her mother Elena and her father-coach Oleg are both former sprinters.

== Competition record ==
Year	Competition	Venue	Position	Event	Notes
Representing Kazakhstan
2003	World Youth Championships	Sherbrooke, Canada	22nd (h)	100 m hrd (76.2 cm)	14.39
2005	Universiade	İzmir, Turkey	23rd (h)	100 m hrd	14.42
2006	Asian Games	Doha, Qatar	5th	100 m hrd	13.30
2007	Universiade	Bangkok, Thailand	4th	100 m hrd	13.12
2007	World Championships	Osaka, Japan	42nd (h)	100 m	11.69
2007	Asian Indoor Games	Macau	3rd	60 m hrd	8.48
2008	Olympic Games	Beijing, China	17th (h)	100 m hrd	12.99
2012	Olympic Games	London, United Kingdom	38th (h)	100 m hrd	13.77
2013	Asian Championships	Pune, India	4th (h)	100 m hrd	13.71
2014	Asian Indoor Championships	Hangzhou, China	2nd	60 m hrd	8.27
2014	World Indoor Championships	Sopot, Poland	27th (h)	60 m hrd	8.27
2014	Asian Games	Incheon, South Korea	8th (h)	100 m hrd	13.73
2015	Asian Championships	Wuhan, China	2nd	100 m hrd	13.33
2016	Asian Indoor Championships	Doha, Qatar	2nd	60 m hrd	8.17
2016	Olympic Games	Rio de Janeiro, Brazil	39th (h)	100 m hrd	13.29
2017	Asian Championships	Bhubaneswar, India	6th	100 m hrd	13.59
2017	Asian Indoor and Martial Arts Games	Ashgabat, Turkmenistan	3rd	60 m hrd	8.59
2018	Asian Games	Jakarta, Indonesia	6th	100 m hrd	13.64
