= Yennefer =

Yennefer, Yenifer, or Yennifer is a (usually female) given name likely derived from the Cornish name Jennifer, itself a cognate of the name Guinevere. It appears more in Spanish speaking and Latin American countries. Real and fictional people with the name include:

== Yennefer ==
- Yennefer of Vengerberg, a female character from The Witcher universe

== Yenifer ==
- Yenifer Giménez (born 1996, Yenifer Yuliet Giménez Gamboa), female Venezuelan footballer
- Jennifer Padilla (born 1990, Jennifer Padilla González), female Colombian track and field athlete

== Yennifer ==
- Yennifer Toledo (born 2000, Yennifer Amanda Toledo Abreu), female Cuban handball player
- Jennifer Cesar (born 1989, Jennifer Mariana Cesar Salazar), female Venezuelan road cyclist
- Frank Casañas (born 1978, Yennifer Frank Casañas Hernández), male Spanish discus thrower who competed for Cuba and Spain

== See also ==
- Jennifer
- Park Ye-eun (born 1989, also known as Yenny), female South Korean singer
