= Jenni =

Jenni is a feminine given name, sometimes a modern diminutive or short form of Jennifer. The etymology is actually that of a diminutive of Jane, however.

A separate name, with the same spelling, serves as a Finnish language diminutive of Johanna.

== People with the given name Jenni ==
- Jenni Baird (born 1976), Australian actress
- Jenni Barber, American actress and singer
- Jenni Burke, Australian swimmer
- Jenni Calder (21st century), Scottish literary historian
- Jenni Dahlman (born 1981), Finnish model
- Jenni Dant (born 1982), American basketball player
- Jenni Falconer (born 1976), Scottish television presenter
- Jenni Farley (born 1986), American television personality
- Jenni Haukio (born 1977), Finnish poet and the wife of the former President of Finland
- Jenni Hucul (born 1988), Canadian bobsledder
- Jenni Irani (1923–1982), Indian cricketer
- Jenni Keenan Green (born 1970), Scottish actress
- Jenni Meno (21st century), American pair skater
- Jenni Murray (born 1950), British journalist and broadcaster
- Jenni Ogden, New Zealand neuroscientist
- Jenni Olson (born 1962), American film director
- Jenni Rivera (born 1969), Mexican American musician
- Jenni Vartiainen (born 1983), Finnish pop singer
- Jenni Vähämaa (born 1992), Finnish figure skater

== Fictional characters with the given name Jenni ==
- Jenni Vainio, a fictional character in the Finnish drama series Salatut elämät

== People with the surname Jenni ==
- Clarence Marvin Jenni (1896–1973), discoverer of Jennite, a calcium silicate hydrate mineral, and director of the Geological Museum at the University of Missouri
- Florian Jenni (born 1980), Swiss chess player
- Marcel Jenni (born 1974), Swiss ice hockey player
- Alexis Jenni (born 1963), French literary writer

== See also ==
- Jenny (given name), includes variant spelling Jennie
- Jennifer (disambiguation)
