= Jenny (elephant) =

Female Asian elephant

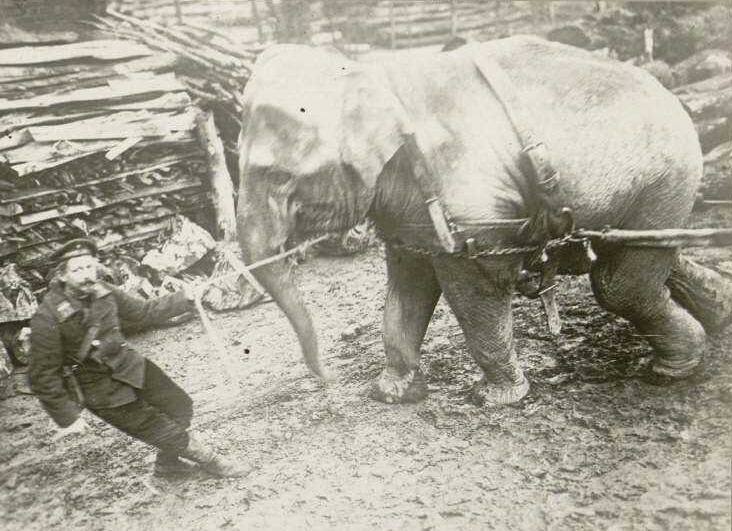
- Jenny with her mahout Matthias Walter carrying logs in northern France, c. 1915
- Species: Asian elephant
- Sex: Female
- Born: 1899 probably Ceylon
- Died: February 1941 (aged approximately 42 years); Paris, France
- Occupation: Zoo and circus attraction
- Owners: Tierpark Hagenbeck; Imperial German Army; Jardin d'Acclimatation
- Height: 2.50 m (8 ft 2 in)

Jenny (1899 – February 1941), was a 20th-century female Asian elephant probably born in Ceylon. Jenny was exported to Germany, between 1915 and 1917 she was put into a work service in the Imperial German Army being one of the very few elephants serving in the Central Powers armies in World War I.

== History ==
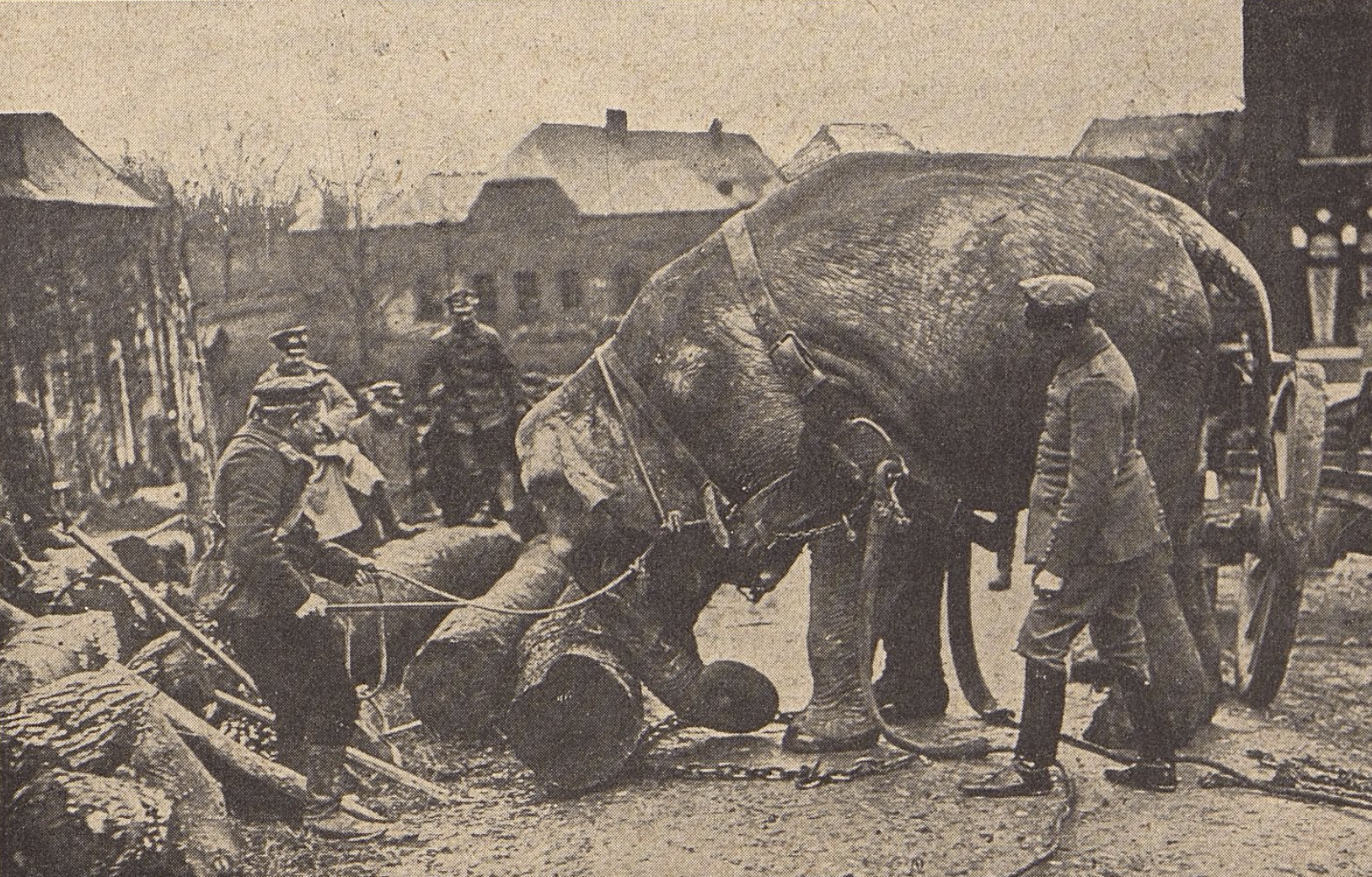
Jenny with Walter at work in 1915.

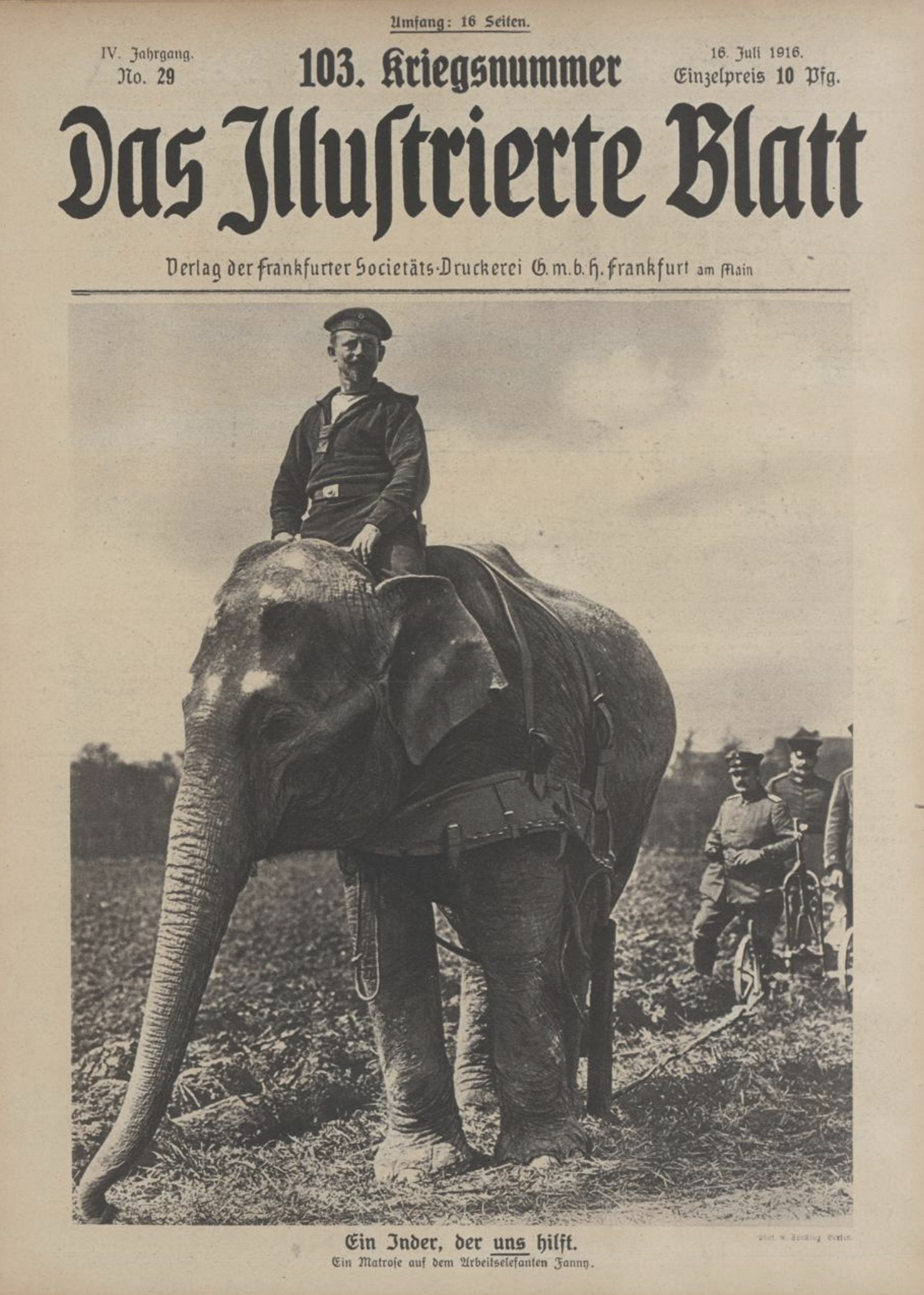
The Indian, who helps us. Jenny with Walter plowing the field in northern France (Das Illustrierte Blatt, 1916).

Jenny was born in 1899, probably in Ceylon. In 1904, at the age of five she was bought by Carl Hagenbeck, German merchant of wild animals, and transferred to his zoo Tierpark Hagenbeck in Hamburg.

After the beginning of World War I Jenny was transported by train to the occupied north of France at the initiative of the German commanding officer of the Avesnes area, arriving in January or April 1915. Her German mahout (keeper), Matthias Walter, who was drafted into the Imperial German Navy in 1914, was recalled and sent to Avesnes to look after the animal. The elephant worked at various tasks to help German war efforts on the occupied territory like pushing rail wagons of coal, pulling the plough or carrying wood logs. In 1916, Germans transferred Jenny and her mahout, by train again, to Felleries, where she took part in the logging work in the surrounding forests. Jenny was capable of moving 50 logs a day, as much as twelve horses. She also participated in circus performances for the German soldiers. Her photos were widely used as a part of German war propaganda.

On 2 April 1917, the elephant returned to Hamburg and was sold to the Circus Strassbourger from Strasbourg. Jenny spent her last years in the Jardin d'Acclimatation zoo in Paris, where she died in February 1941 at age of approximately 41 or 42 years.

== Memory ==
In 2015, a life-size steel and wicker statue of Jenny was erected in Felleries (4 m long and 2.5 m wide).

== See also ==
- History of elephants in Europe
- List of individual elephants

== Literature ==
- Lorenz Hagenbeck (1962). Presses pocket (ed.). Ces bêtes que j'aimais tant (in German). René Jouan. p. 253.
- Jean-Michel Boulenger (December 2016). "Il était une fois Felleries, annuaire des activités de 1914 à 1939" (PDF). L'Avesnois Bulletin.
- "Ein Inder, der uns hilft". Das Illustrierte Blatt (in German). 103: 1. 16 July 1916.
