= Cao Mojie =

Chinese athlete

Personal information
- Nationality: Chinese
- Born: 10 April 1992 (age 34)

Sport
- Sport: Long-distance running
- Event: Marathon

Cao Mojie (born 10 April 1992) is a Chinese long-distance runner. She competed in the women's marathon at the 2017 World Championships in Athletics.
