= Jennica =

Jennica is a female given name. Notable people with the name include:

- Jennica Garcia (born 1989), Filipino actress, host, and director
- Jennica Haikarainen (born 1989), Finnish ice hockey player
- Jennica Harper, Canadian television writer and producer
- Jennica Sanchez, contestant on series five of Asia's Next Top Model

== See also ==
- Jenica Atwin (born 1987), Canadian politician
