= Brew Riverson Jnr =

Ghanaian actor

- Born: Ebenezer Henry Brew-Riverson Jnr; Ghana
- Occupation(s): Actor, lecturer
- Notable work: Deadly Voyage

Ebenezer Henry Brew-Riverson Jnr, is a veteran actor who played multi-character roles on Ghanaian television in the 1980s and 1990s. His father has the same name as him (minus the jnr). As of 2016, he is a lecturer with the Theater Arts Department of the University of Education, Winneba.

== Filmography ==
- Sika Sunsum (1991)
- Nkrabea (1992) – Pastor
- Stolen Pregnancy (Part 1, 2 & 3)
- Through a Film Darkly
- Jennifer (1998 film) (1998) – Dr. Frank Addo
- One Flesh
- Accra Killings
- Life and Living it (2007) – Kente
- Deadly Voyage (1996)
- The Police Officer (Part 1 & 2)
- "I Will Stop Them Now"
- " Midnight Call"
- "Who Killed Nancy" (1995)
- Dark Sand (1999) – Ins. Opoku
