= Jenny (surname) =

Jenny as a surname may refer to:

- William Le Baron Jenney (1832–1907) American architect and engineer
- Hans Jenny (pedologist) (1899–1992), soil scientist
- Tina Keller-Jenny (1887–1985) Swiss physician and Jungian psychotherapist
- Hans Jenny (cymatics) (1904–1972), father of Cymatics, the study of wave phenomena
- Zoë Jenny (born 1974), German-Swiss author
- Jean-François Jenny-Clark (1944–1998) French double bass player
- Ladina Jenny (born 1993) Swiss snowboarder
- Samuel Ludwig Jenny (born 25-Aug-1888, died 19-Jun-1964, world champion skeet shooter
- Edward Irvin Jenny (born March 20, 1947), Musician, photographer, software and recording engineer and producer

== See also ==
- William Jennys (1774–1859), American primitive portrait painter
