= Jenney Stockade Site =

- U.S. National Register of Historic Places
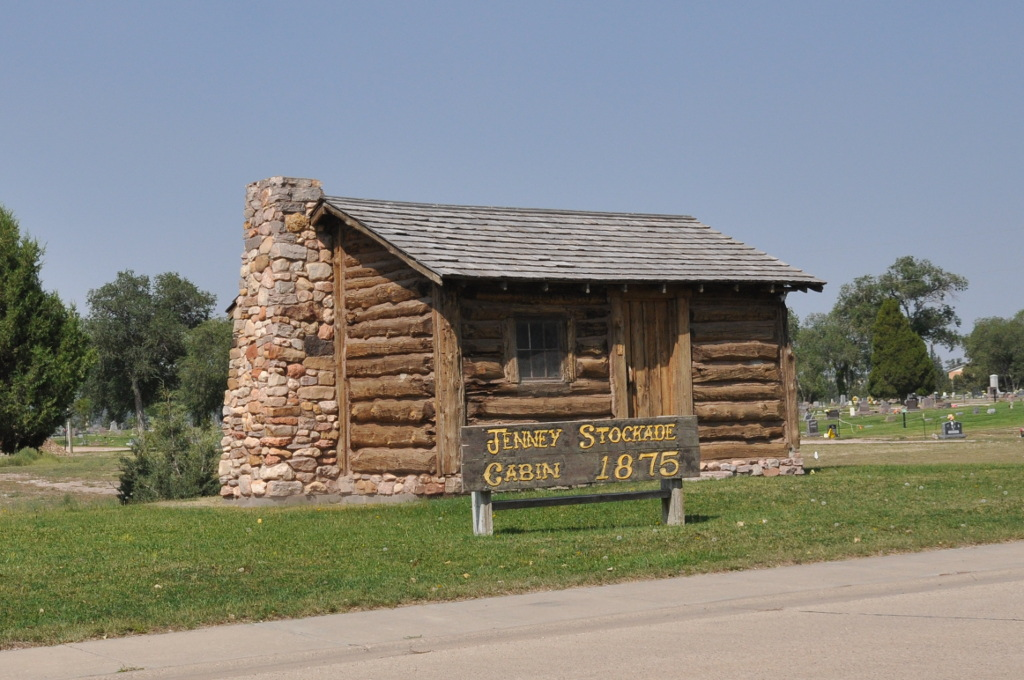

- Location within Wyoming Location within the United States
- Nearest city: Newcastle, Wyoming
- Coordinates: 43°51′02.1″N 104°11′36.3″W
- Built: 1857
- NRHP reference No.: 69000198
- Added to NRHP: September 30, 1969

The Jenney Stockade was a stage station on the Cheyenne-Deadwood route near Newcastle, Wyoming. It also served as a headquarters for a military expedition to the Black Hills to survey the area for minerals. The site was first occupied in 1857, when Lieutenant G.K. Warren and geologist Dr. F.V. Hayden set up a small base camp for their expedition. In 1875, the site was reoccupied by a party of 75 miners and geologist, accompanied by 432 soldiers, who built a log fort, named Camp Jenney after the chief geologist, Professor Walter P. Jenney.

From June 1877 the site became a stop on the Cheyenne-Deadwood stage line, and was renamed the Jenney Stockade. The stockade served as a base for cavalry escorts of Black Hills gold shipments to the south. In 1878 oil was discovered in the district. From 1877 the stockade and surrounding lands became the property of LAK Cattle Company. The stockade was used for a time by the LAK, but was eventually moved from the site to Newcastle to make way for newer buildings.

The Jenney Stockade Site was placed on the National Register of Historic Places in 1969. The site is described at a nearby roadside pullout east of Newcastle.

The Jenney stockade has been relocated into the town of Newcastle, in a small city park.
