= Asuka Terada =

Japanese hurdler (born 1990)

Personal information
- Born: 14 January 1990 (age 36) Sapporo, Japan
- Education: Waseda University
- Height: 1.68 m (5 ft 6 in)
- Weight: 57 kg (126 lb)

Sport
- Sport: Athletics
- Event: 100 m hurdles
Medal record
Women's athletics
Representing Japan
Asian Indoor Championships
Silver medal – second place	2024 Tehran	60 m hurdles

Asuka Terada (寺田 明日香, Terada Asuka; born 14 January 1990, in Sapporo) is a Japanese athlete specialising in the sprint hurdles. She twice represented her country at the World Championships, first at the 2009 edition in Berlin and then over a decade later at the 2019 edition in Doha.

Her personal best in the event is 12.86 seconds (+0.7 m/s) set in Osaka in 2023. This is the current national record.

She retired in 2013 because of injuries. After marriage and childbirth, she decided to return to sport in 2017, first giving rugby a try and a year later coming back to athletics.

== International competitions ==
Year	Competition	Venue	Position	Event	Notes
Representing Japan
2008	World Junior Championships	Bydgoszcz, Poland	55th (h)	100 m	12.53
2008	World Junior Championships	Bydgoszcz, Poland	15th (sf)	100 m hurdles	13.85
2009	World Championships	Berlin, Germany	29th (h)	100 m hurdles	13.41
2009	Asian Championships	Guangzhou, China	2nd	100 m hurdles	13.20
2009	Asian Championships	Guangzhou, China	1st (h)	4 × 100 m relay	44.34
2010	Continental Cup	Split, Croatia	8th	100 m hurdles	13.67^{1}
2010	Asian Games	Guangzhou, China	5th	100 m hurdles	13.29
2010	Asian Games	Guangzhou, China	2nd (h)	4 × 100 m relay	44.73
2019	World Championships	Doha, Qatar	29th (h)	100 m hurdles	13.20
2021	Olympic Games	Tokyo, Japan	20th (sf)	100 m hurdles	13.06
2023	Asian Championships	Bangkok, Thailand	2nd	100 m hurdles	13.13
2023	World Championships	Budapest, Hungary	36th (h)	100 m hurdles	13.15
2024	Asian Indoor Championships	Tehran, Iran	2nd	60 m hurdles	8.21

^{1}Representing Asia-Pacific
