= Wu Shuijiao =

Chinese hurdler (born 1991)

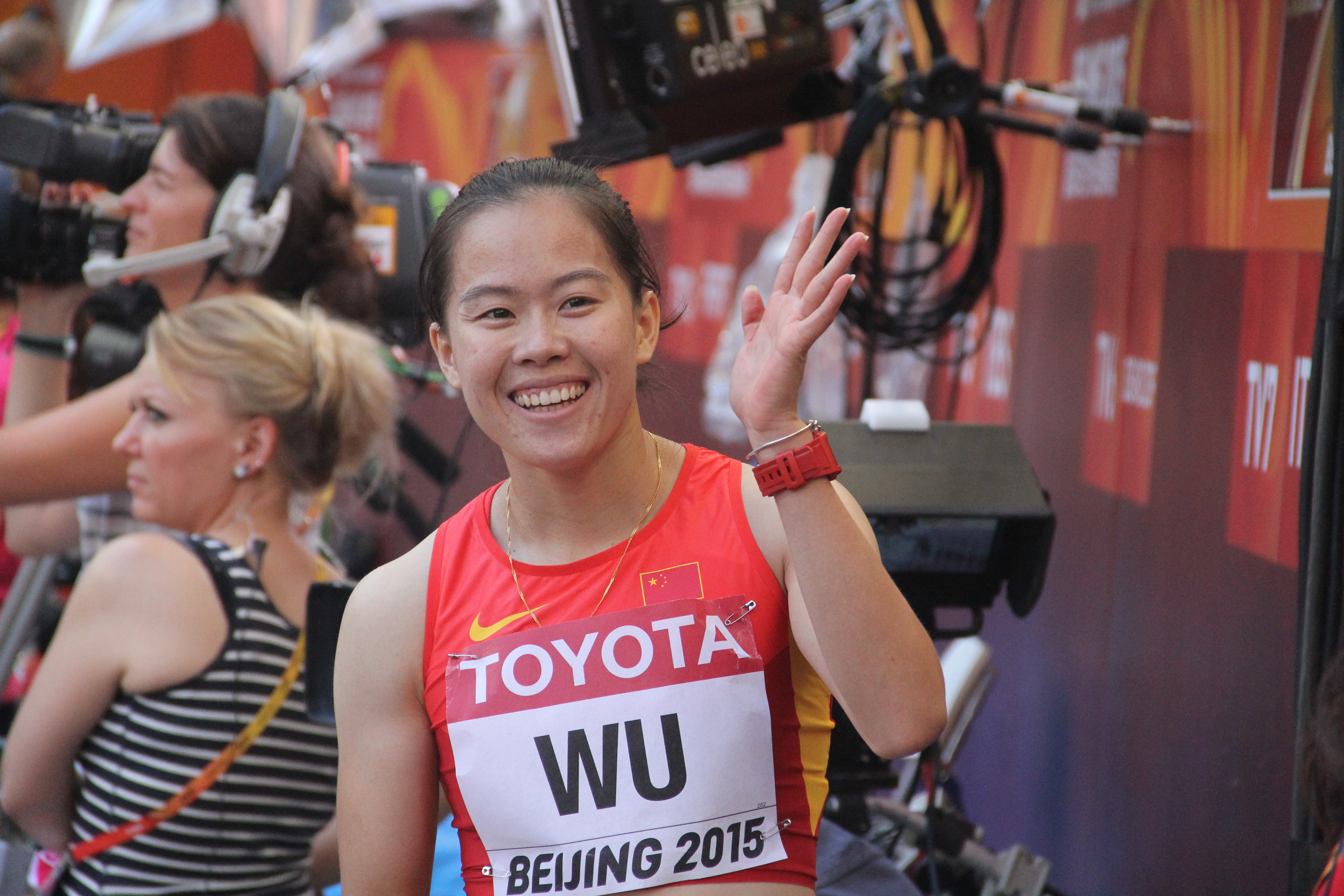
- Wu at the 2015 World Championships

Medal record

Women's athletics

Representing China

Asian Indoor Championships
| Gold medal – first place | 2012 Guangzhou | 60 m hurdles |
| Gold medal – first place | 2014 Hangzhou | 60 m hurdles |

East Asian Games
| Gold medal – first place | 2013 Tianjin | 100 m hurdles |

Wu Shuijiao (simplified Chinese: 吴水娇; traditional Chinese: 吳水娇; pinyin: Wú Shuǐjiāo; born 19 June 1991 in Xinyi) is a female Chinese track and field athlete who competes in hurdling. Her personal best for the 100 metres hurdles is 12.93 seconds, set in 2013. Wu was the Chinese champion in the event in 2012 and 2013.

She was the 2010 Asian Junior champion and won her first senior title at the 2012 Asian Indoor Athletics Championships. She was the gold medallist in the hurdles at the 2013 East Asian Games and the 2013 National Games of China. She represented China at the 2011 Asian Athletics Championships and the 2013 World Championships in Athletics.

== Career ==
Wu was recruited to begin training in hurdling when she was a fifth-grade student in elementary school in Doumen District, Zhuhai. As a teenager, she won three straight national junior (under-20) titles from 2008 to 2010. At the 11th Chinese National Games in 2009 she set a personal best time of 13.67 seconds and was a finalist in the event, as well as placing fourth in the 4×100 metres relay with her native province, Guangdong. Her first international medals came at the 2010 Asian Junior Athletics Championships: she claimed the 100 m hurdles title at the 2010 Asian Junior Athletics Championships, winning by almost half a second, and also helped China to the silver medals in the 4×100 m relay. In her last race of the season, she set a new best of 13.62 seconds to place fifth at the Chinese Athletics Championships.

Wu moved into the senior ranks in 2011. That year she improved her best time to 13.19 seconds, won the Kunshan and Jiaxing legs of the Chinese Athletics Grand Prix and came seventh in the final of the 2011 Asian Athletics Championships. She managed only seventh at the national championships that year. Her breakthrough year came in 2012 and began with her winning the 60 metres hurdles gold medal at the 2012 Asian Indoor Athletics Championships in a championship record time of 8.24 seconds. A string of outdoor wins in China that season, including the national universities championship, concluded in her first national title and a personal best of 12.98 seconds at the Chinese Championships in September.

She opened 2013 with a 60 m hurdles best of 8.19 seconds in Nanjing. Her first outdoor competition that year saw her run 13.08 seconds, and she established her supremacy among Chinese hurdlers that year by taking her second national title. This earned her a debut appearance 2013 World Championships in Athletics, but she failed to get past the heats of the global level event. At the 12th Chinese Games she beat two-time Asian champion Sun Yawei to take the hurdles gold medal in a new best of 12.96 seconds. She also helped the Guangdong team to third in the relay race. Wu closed the year with a gold medal at the 2013 East Asian Games in a Games record of 12.93 seconds – a time that ranked her as the top Asian hurdler that year. Wu has been banned after testing positive in June 2018 for norandrosterone. Wu is banned until July 2022 and her coach Dai Jianhua received a two year ban.

== Personal bests ==
| Event | Time (sec) | Date | Place |
|---|---|---|---|
| 60 metres hurdles | 8.19 | 6 March 2013 | Nanjing, China |
| 100 metres hurdles | 12.93 | 9 October 2013 | Tianjin, China |

== Major competition record ==
| Year | Competition | Venue | Position | Event | Notes |
|---|---|---|---|---|---|
| 2009 | Chinese National Games | Jinan, China | 8th | 100 m hurdles | |
| 2009 | Chinese National Games | Jinan, China | 4th | 4×100 m relay | |
| 2010 | Asian Junior Championships | Hanoi, Vietnam | 1st | 100 m hurdles | |
| 2010 | Asian Junior Championships | Hanoi, Vietnam | 2nd | 4×100 m relay | |
| 2011 | Asian Championships | Kobe, Japan | 7th | 100 m hurdles | |
| 2012 | Asian Indoor Championships | Hangzhou, China | 1st | 100 m hurdles | |
| 2013 | World Championships | Moscow, Russia | 26th (heats) | 100 m hurdles | |
| 2013 | Chinese National Games | Shenyang, China | 1st | 100 m hurdles | |
| 2013 | Chinese National Games | Shenyang, China | 3rd | 4×100 m relay | |
| 2013 | East Asian Games | Tianjin, China | 1st | 100 m hurdles | |
| 2015 | World Championships | Beijing, China | 19th (sf) | 100 m hurdles | 13.06 |
| 2016 | Olympic Games | Rio de Janeiro, Brazil | 25th (h) | 100 m hurdles | 13.03 |
