= Jeniffer Viturino =

Brazilian fashion model (1993–2011)

Jeniffer Corneau Viturino
- Born: 13 May 1993; Rio de Janeiro, Brazil
- Died: 8 April 2011 (aged 17); Parque das Naçõs neighborhood, Lisbon, Portugal
- Cause of death: Suicide

Jeniffer Corneau Viturino (13 May 1993 – 8 April 2011) was a Brazilian fashion model who died in 2011 at the age of 17. She was best known for her cover appearance on the Portuguese J magazine and later known for her mysterious death ruled as suicide.

Born in Brazil, Viturino moved to Portugal in 2007 and began modeling there. She won the Miss Odivelas contest in 2009, and landed on the cover of the Portuguese J magazine's February 2011 issue (No. 233). Her last modeling activity was a runway walking for a cosmetics brand.

== Death ==
On the evening of 8 April 2011, Viturino was found dead in Parque das Nações, a prestigious neighborhood in Lisbon. She died after falling from the 15th floor of the building where she lived with her boyfriend Miguel Alves da Silva, a 31-year-old businessman known to have multiple wives and to be abusive to his girlfriends, according to her brother. She was 17.

Police concluded she committed suicide, as the evidence collected did not indicate any third party intervention. Viturino left a suicide note which asked her family for forgiveness for her action. The note included some cryptic messages for her family, which her mother described to be "very vague".
