= Viktor de Jeney =

Hungarian painter (1902–1996)

Viktor de Jeney (December 26, 1902 in Marosvásárhely, Transylvania – December 18, 1996 in St. Louis, Missouri) was a Hungarian painter.

== Biography ==
De Jeney was a Hungarian artist who came to the United States after fleeing Hungary for his role in a Hungarian anti-communist uprising. On October 23, 1956, De Jeney, then 53, was part of a small group who tried to topple a 25-foot statue of Soviet premier Joseph Stalin in Budapest's Stalin Square. The uprising was halted at that time by Russian tanks.

De Jeney moved to St. Louis, Missouri, in part due to his passion for fishing and outdoor activities. He was a highly regarded portrait painter and was also known for creating replicas of famous oil paintings that rivaled the originals. In 1976, De Jeney moved to Washington, D.C., after receiving a special honor to create commissioned copies of historical paintings. He also created a renowned etching of the 56 signers of the Declaration of Independence.

De Jeney died in a house fire in 1996 while making violins, a trade he took up in his 90s.

== Works ==
An unknown number of De Jeney originals and replicas remain in circulation, mostly in the United States and Europe. De Jeney was known mostly for oil on canvas and his replicas of other paintings are most frequently found to be remarkably similar to those of Rembrandt. De Jeney's respect among the art community has continued to grow significantly since his death. Like many top artists, his fame in the art community appears to have come well after his death.

=== Notable works ===
Four of De Jeney's original oil paintings have received significant interest in the art community and recently sold for significant sums.

1. Haystacks in Winter, 1971, 63.5 in × 46.7 in (161 cm × 119 cm) or 63.5 cm × 46.7 cm (25.0 in × 18.4 in) oil/canvas
2. Old Native American Figure in Southwest Landscape, 1967, 101.6 in × 72.2 in (258 cm × 183 cm) or 101.6 cm × 72.2 cm (40.0 in × 28.4 in) oil/canvas
3. Seated Native American Figure, 1967, 76.2 in × 61.0 in (194 cm × 155 cm) or 76.2 cm × 61.0 cm (30.0 in × 24.0 in) oil/canvas
4. Profile of a young native American Girl in Straw Hat
