= List of storms named Jennifer =

The name Jennifer has been used for three tropical cyclones in the East Pacific Ocean:

- Tropical Storm Jennifer–Katherine (1963)
- Hurricane Jennifer (1969)
- Tropical Storm Jennifer (1973)
