= Nikkita Holder =

Canadian hurdler

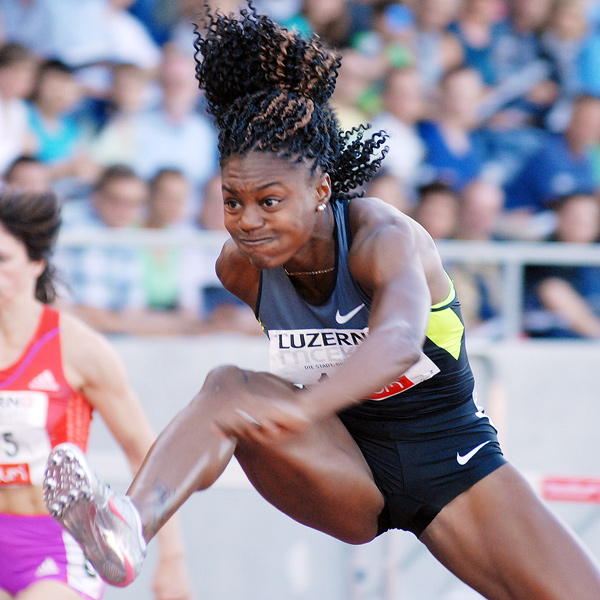
- Nikkita Holder at "Spitzen Leichtathletik Luzern" 2012, Lucerne, Switzerland

Personal information
- Nationality: Canadian
- Born: 7 May 1987 (age 39) East York, Ontario
- Height: 1.70 m (5 ft 7 in)
- Weight: 59 kg (130 lb)

Sport
- Sport: 100 m hurdles

Achievements and titles
- Personal bests: 100 m hurdles: 12.80 Calgary, 2012
Medal record
Women's athletics
Representing Canada
Pan American Games
Bronze medal – third place	2015 Toronto	100 m hurdles

Nikkita Holder (born May 7, 1987 in East York, Ontario) is a Canadian track and field athlete of Barbadian descent who specialises in the 100 metres hurdles. Holder won the bronze medal at the 2015 Pan American Games in her home country and city in Toronto.

== Career ==
Holder competed at the 2015 Pan American Games. This event took place just one month after her father's death, in the finals she ran toward a bronze setting a season's best at 12.85. After the race she said "Since he’s passed, right before I race I kind of have this moment when I get teary-eyed. It kind of lets me know that he’s here. Getting this medal is a confirmation of my training, how hard I’ve worked emotionally and physically. I’m pretty pleased with myself."

In July 2016 she was officially named to Canada's Olympic team.

== Personal ==
She was married to fellow national track and sprinter Justyn Warner, together they have one child.

== Honours ==
In 2012 Holder was awarded the Queen Elizabeth II Diamond Jubilee Medal.

== Achievements ==
Year	Competition	Venue	Position	Event	Notes
Representing Canada
2006	World Junior Championships	Beijing, China	12th (sf)	100m hurdles	13.94 (wind: -1.6 m/s)
2011	World Championships	Daegu, South Korea	6th	100 m hurdles	12.93
2012	World Indoor Championships	Istanbul, Turkey	6th	60 m hurdles	8.09
2015	World Championships	Beijing, China	16th (sf)	100 m hurdles	13.00
2016	Olympic Games	Rio de Janeiro, Brazil	20th (h)	100 m hurdles	12.92^{1}

^{1}Disqualified in the semifinals

== See also ==
- List of Canadian sports personalities
