= Jenny =

Jenny may refer to:

- Jenny (given name), a popular feminine name
- Jenny (surname), a family name

== Animals ==
- Jenny (donkey), a female donkey
- Jenny (elephant), a female elephant in the German Army in World War I
- Jenny (gorilla), the oldest gorilla in captivity at the time of her death at age 55
- Jenny (orangutan), an orangutan in the London Zoo in the 1830s

== Films ==
- Jenny (1936 film), a French film by Marcel Carné
- Jenny (1958 film), a Dutch film
- Jenny (1962 film), an Australian television film
- Jenny (1970 film), a film starring Alan Alda and Marlo Thomas

== Music ==
- "Jenny" (The Click Five song) (2007)
- "Jenny" (Johnny Mathis song) (1961)
- "Jenny" (Nothing More song) (2015)
- "Jenny" (Studio Killers song) (2013)
- "867-5309/Jenny", a 1982 song by Tommy Tutone
- "Jenny", a 1968 song by John Mayall & the Bluesbreakers
- "Jenny", a 1973 song by Chicago from Chicago VI
- "Jenny", a 1995 song by Shaggy from Boombastic
- "Jenny", a 1997 song by Sleater-Kinney from Dig Me Out
- "Jenny", a 1997 song by Edyta Bartosiewicz from Dziecko
- "Jenny", a 2002 song by the Mountain Goats from All Hail West Texas
- "Jenny", a 2003 song by Stellastarr
- "Jenny", a 2012 song by Walk the Moon from Walk the Moon
- "Jenny", a 2019 song by Kate Rusby from Philosophers, Poets & Kings
- "Jenny (Iowa Sunrise)", by Janis Ian from Night Rains

== People and fictional characters ==
- Jenny (actor) (fl. 21st century), Indian comedian and actor in Telugu cinema
- Jenny (singer) (fl. 2006), Spanish singer
- Jenny (Doctor Who), a character in Doctor Who
- Jenny, a character in the 2022 Indian film RRR, played by Olivia Morris

== Places ==
- Jenny, Suriname, a town
- Jenny Estate, a mansion in Thalwil, Switzerland

== Transportation ==
- Jenny (schooner), an alleged English ship in an unsubstantiated legend
- Jenny (1783 ship), an earlier schooner
- SS Jenny, a Panamanian steamship
- Curtiss JN-4 or Jenny, a biplane training aircraft
- Genoa (sail) or Jenny, a large form of the jib sail

== Other uses ==
- Jenny (novel), a 1911 novel by Sigrid Undset
- Jenny (doll), a Japanese toy
- Jenny (TV series), a 1997 sitcom featuring Jenny McCarthy
- "Jenny", a 1978 poem by Patti Smith from Babel
- "Jenny", a 2022 Indonesian film series starring by Prilly Latuconsina from Happy Go Jenny

== See also ==
- Jennie (disambiguation)
- Jenei (disambiguation)
- Jeney (disambiguation)
- Jenny (brand), a fashion brand of Jenny Sacerdote
- "Jenny Jenny", a 1957 song by Little Richard from Here's Little Richard
- Spinning jenny, a device used in the textile industry
