= Gayathri Govindaraj =

Indian athlete

Gayathry Govindharaj
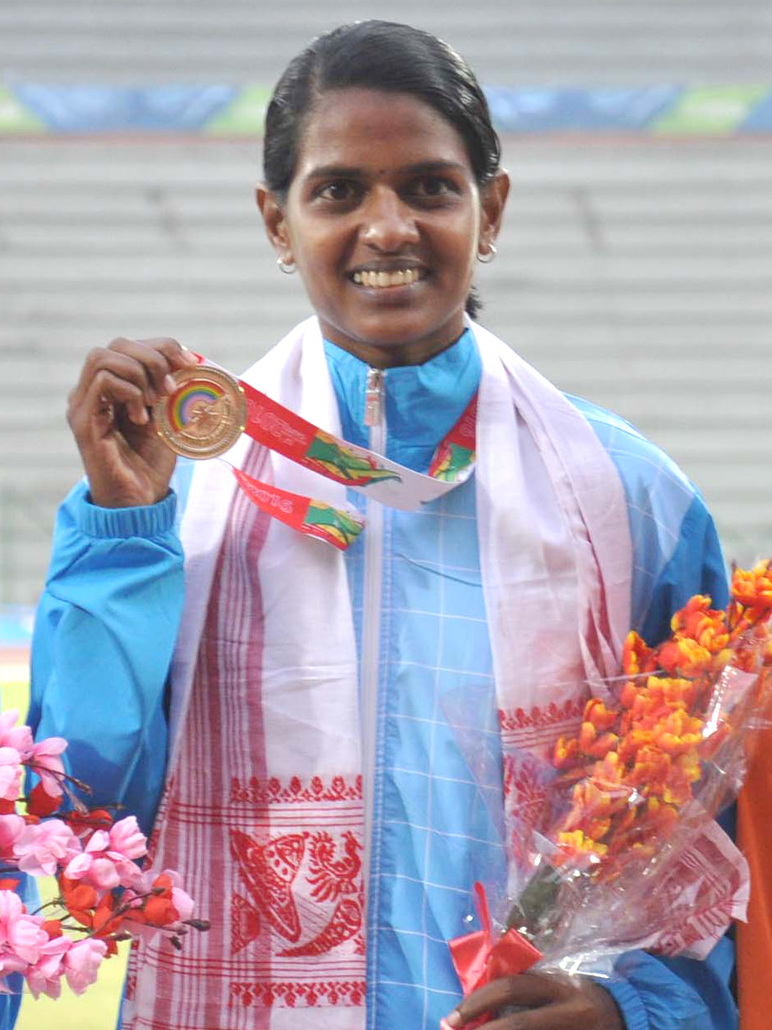
- Gayathry with her Gold Medal, at the 12th South Asian Games in 2016

Personal information
- Nationality: Indian
- Born: 27 April 1991 (age 35) Chennai, India

Sport
- Country: India
- Sport: Track and field
- Events: 100 metres hurdles Triple jump
- College team: St.Joseph's College of Engineering & M.O.P.Vaishnav College for Women

Achievements and titles
- Personal bests: 100 m hurdles: 13.59 s Triple jump: 13.58 m Recipient of Tamilnadu Chief Minister's Best Sports Person Award for the year 2009-10
Medal record
Commonwealth Youth Games
Silver medal – second place	2008 Pune	100 m hurdles
Silver medal – second place	2008 Pune	Triple jump
Gold medal – first place	2008 Pune	4×100 m relay
South Asian Games
Gold medal – first place	2016 Guwahati	100m hurdles
Gold medal – first place	2010 Dhaka	100m hurdles
Asian Indoor Athletics Championships
Bronze medal – third place	2016 Doha	60m hurdles
Asian Junior Athletics Championships
Silver medal – second place	2010 Hanoi	Triple Jump
Silver medal – second place	2010 Hanoi	4x100m Relay
Asian Grand Prix
Silver medal – second place	2015 Chanthaburi	100m Hurdles
Bronze medal – third place	2015 Pathum Thani	100m Hurdles
Bronze medal – third place	2015 Bangkok	100m Hurdles
Commonwealth Games
	2010 New Delhi	100m Hurdles & Triple Jump
Asian Athletics Championships
	2013 Pune	100m Hurdles
	2015 Wuhan	100m Hurdles
World Junior Athletics Championships
	2010 Wuhan	100m Hurdles & Triple Jump

Gayathry Govindharaj (born 27 April 1991) is an Indian athlete who competes in the 100 metres hurdles and triple jump events. She was supported by Olympic Gold Quest, a not-for-profit foundation that identifies and supports Indian athletes. She works with the Indian Income Tax department. She was roughed up DMK cadres and her vehicle was damaged when raiding the premises of alleged DMK partymen. She was later admitted in a hospital for wounds. She is famously called as "Indian Usain Bolt".

== Early life and education ==
Gayathry comes from a small village in Ariyalur district. She comes from a humble background and before she gained fame, her family found it difficult to make ends meet. Due to her economic background her parents could not afford to provide her a formal training hence was trained at St. Joseph's Sports Academy (sponsored by St. Joseph's College of Engineering, Chennai) and she says in an interview with The Indian Express, "My parents recollect that I used to run around a lot during my childhood. In school, I used to participate in every athletic event in every tournament."

She completed her schooling from St. Ursula's A.I.Hr.Sec School, Church Park, Chennai, in 2008. After securing 91 per cent in her twelfth standard, She went to pursue her master's degree in business administration from St. Joseph's College of Engineering, where she secured 33rd Rank in Anna University among 8599 qualified candidates. Her mother's dream of pursuing PhD came true, when she was awarded a PhD (business administration – commerce) by the University of Madras in 2022, for her interdisciplinary thesis on Effectiveness of Training.

== Career and achievements ==
After participating in various inter college sports events, she gained fame through the 18th Zone Junior inter-State athletic Championship (2006) in Raichur. She won gold in U-16 100M hurdles in this. She also broke Poonam Belliappa's 11-year-old record of 14.40 seconds in the under-18 category in the year 2016. This was followed by her another 14.04 seconds in 2008 and in Mysore she beat her own record by 0.02 seconds.

Her left knee was injured during the triple jump event of the Commonwealth Games 2010 that happened in New Delhi. After being operated on her left leg, she said in an interview with The Hindu that she has been practicing hard to be a part of sports once again.
