= Wang Dou =

Chinese hurdler (born 1993)

Personal information
- Born: 18 May 1993 (age 33)
- Education: Physical education at Nanjing Normal University
- Height: 167 cm (5 ft 6 in)
- Weight: 57 kg (126 lb)

Sport
- Sport: Athletics
- Event: 100 m hurdles

Achievements and titles
- Personal best: 13.09 (2013)
Medal record
Representing China
Asian Athletics Championships
Bronze medal – third place	2017 Bhubaneswar	100 m hurdles

Wang Dou (born 18 May 1993) is a Chinese hurdler who specializes in the 100 m distance. She won a bronze medal at the 2017 Asian Championships and placed fourth at the 2018 Asian Games.

== Athletic Career ==
Wang Dou gained her first international experience at the 2012 Asian Junior Championships in Colombo, where she won the gold medal in 13.80 seconds, qualifying for the World Junior Championships in Barcelona, where she finished seventh in 13.58 seconds. The following year, she was unable to finish her race in the final of the Asian Championships in Pune, and at the East Asian Games in Tianjin, she finished fourth in 13.53 seconds. It wasn't until four years later that she participated in the Asian Championships in Bhubaneswar, winning the bronze medal in 13.36 seconds. In 2018, she participated in the Asian Games in Jakarta for the first time, finishing fourth in 13.50 seconds.
