= Jeney =

Jeney is a surname. Notable people with the surname include:

- László Jeney (1923–2006), Hungarian water polo player
- Mihály Lajos Jeney (1723/1724–1797), Hungarian general and mapmaker
- Viktor de Jeney (1902–1996), Hungarian painter
- Zoltán Jeney (1943–2019), Hungarian composer
