= Jenni Hucul =

Canadian bobsledder (born 1988)

Personal information
- Born: May 17, 1988 (age 38)
Medal record
Bobsleigh
World Championships
Silver medal – second place	2008 Altenberg	Mixed team

Jenni Hucul (born May 17, 1988) is a Canadian bobsledder who has competed since 2007. She won the silver medal in the mixed bobsleigh-skeleton team event at the 2008 FIBT World Championships in Altenberg, Germany.

Jenni was also a star track & field athlete. She is the Canadian Youth (17 and under) record holder in the 100m, which she set when she won the Canadian Junior Championships with a time of 11.54 +1.4 m/s in Saskatoon on July 4, 2003, running in a higher age category. She also won the Canadian Junior championships in the 100m Hurdles in 2007.
