= Sun Yawei =

Chinese hurdler (born 1987)

Medal record

Women's athletics

Representing China

Asian Games
Bronze medal – third place	2010 Guangzhou	100 m hurdles

Asian Championships
Gold medal – first place	2009 Guangzhou	100 m hurdles
Gold medal – first place	2011 Kobe	100 m hurdles

Asian Indoor Championships
Bronze medal – third place	2012 Hangzhou	60 m hurdles
Bronze medal – third place	2014 Hangzhou	60 m hurdles

Sun Yawei (Chinese: 孙雅薇; born 17 October 1987, Changzhou) is a female Chinese track and field athlete who competes in the 100 meter hurdles. She is a two-time gold medallist in the event at the Asian Athletics Championships and won the bronze at the Asian Games in 2010. In China, she is referred to as the "female Liu Xiang", in respect of her more successful hurdling compatriot. Her personal best time is 12.94 seconds, set in July 2011.

Born in Nanjing in Jiangsu Province, she took part in athletics at high school level and began competing at national level in 2007. After winning the 2007 Chinese junior title in the 100 m hurdles, she came third at the World Trials event, improved to second at the Chinese Athletics Championships, then topped the podium at the end of the year at the Chinese City Games. The following year she was third at the Olympic Trials and was again runner-up in the hurdles at the Chinese Championships. She closed 2008 with a personal best run of 13.39 seconds in Zhaoqing.

Sun made improvements in the 2009 season, which began with her winning her first national title with a best of 13.15 seconds. She ran faster (13.12) in the heats at the 11th Chinese National Games, but was not as quick in the final – the more experienced Liu Jing edged Sun into second place. In spite of her defeat in the national competition, she went unbeaten at regional level, winning gold medals at the 2009 Asian Athletics Championships and the East Asian Games.

She ran in Europe for the first time in 2010, setting a 60 metres hurdles best time of 8.24 seconds at the BW-Bank Meeting in Germany. After two wins on the Chinese Athletics Grand Prix circuit, she won China's university title for Nanjing Agricultural University, where she was studying veterinary science. She repeated as the national champion and represented her country in the Décanation event in France, coming fourth. She was among the favorites for the hurdles at the 2010 Asian Games, but it was Korean Lee Yeon-Kyung who went away with the gold, while Sun had to settle for the bronze medal. She began her 2011 outdoor season in good form, winning an Asian Grand Prix meet in 13.18 seconds, and rose to the occasion at the 2011 Asian Athletics Championships in July, where she retained her title in a personal best of 13.04 seconds. Later that month she ran under thirteen seconds for the first time, taking advantage of a 1.7 m/s wind to clock a time of 12.94 seconds in Nanching.
