= 2010 IAAF World Indoor Championships – Women's 60 metres hurdles =

The women's 60 metres hurdles at the 2010 IAAF World Indoor Championships will be held at the ASPIRE Dome on 12 and 13 March.

== Medalists ==
Gold	Silver	Bronze
Lolo Jones; United States	Perdita Felicien; Canada	Priscilla Lopes-Schliep; Canada

== Records ==
Standing records prior to the 2010 IAAF World Indoor Championships
World record	Susanna Kallur (SWE)	7.68	Karlsruhe, Germany	10 February 2008
Championship record	Perdita Felicien (CAN)	7.75	Budapest, Hungary	7 March 2004
World Leading	Priscilla Lopes-Schliep (CAN)	7.82	Stuttgart, Germany	6 February 2010
African record	Glory Alozie (NGR)	7.82	Madrid, Spain	16 February 1999
Asian record	Olga Shishigina (KAZ)	7.82	Liévin, France	21 February 1999
European record	Susanna Kallur (SWE)	7.68	Karlsruhe, Germany	10 February 2008
North and Central American and Caribbean record	Michelle Freeman (JAM)	7.74	Madrid, Spain	3 February 1998
North and Central American and Caribbean record	Gail Devers (USA)	7.74	Boston, United States	1 March 2003
Oceanian Record	Sally McLellan (AUS)	7.96	New York City, United States	30 January 2009
South American record	Maíla Machado (BRA)	8.08	Moscow, Russia	11 March 2006

== Qualification standards ==
Indoor	Outdoor
8.18	12.95 (100mH)

== Schedule ==
Date	Time	Round
March 12, 2010	14:35	Heats
March 13, 2010	16:00	Semifinals
March 13, 2010	18:25	Final

== Results ==
=== Heats ===
Qualification: First 3 in each heat (Q) and the next 4 fastest (q) advance to the semifinals.

Rank	Heat	Name	Nationality	Time	Notes
1	3	Priscilla Lopes-Schliep	Canada	7.94	Q
2	4	Lolo Jones	United States	7.95	Q
3	2	Eline Berings	Belgium	8.00	Q, SB
4	2	Christina Vukicevic	Norway	8.01	Q
5	3	Lacena Golding-Clarke	Jamaica	8.02	Q
6	2	Perdita Felicien	Canada	8.04	Q
7	4	Vonette Dixon	Jamaica	8.04	Q
8	2	Aleksandra Fedoriva	Russia	8.05	q
9	1	Ginnie Powell	United States	8.07	Q
10	1	Lucie Škrobáková	Czech Republic	8.09	Q
11	3	Nadine Hildebrand	Germany	8.10	Q
12	4	Anay Tejeda	Cuba	8.11	Q
13	1	Tatyana Dektyareva	Russia	8.12	Q
14	4	Alice Decaux	France	8.14	q
15	1	Lisa Urech	Switzerland	8.15	q
16	4	Alina Talay	Belarus	8.15	q
17	1	Gemma Bennett	Great Britain	8.20	
18	2	Yevgeniya Snihur	Ukraine	8.22	
19	3	Elisabeth Davin	Belgium	8.23	
20	1	Shantia Moss	Dominican Republic	8.34	
21	2	Aisseta Diawara	France	8.32	
22	3	Seun Adigun	Nigeria	8.58	
23	3	Agustina Bawele	Indonesia	8.99	PB
24	4	Gertrude Lossou	Togo	9.62	
	3	Nevin Yanıt	Turkey	DNS	

=== Semifinals ===
Qualification: First 4 in each heat (Q) advance to the final.

Rank	Heat	Name	Nationality	Time	Notes
1	1	Priscilla Lopes-Schliep	Canada	7.91	Q
2	1	Vonette Dixon	Jamaica	7.94	Q, SB
3	2	Perdita Felicien	Canada	7.94	Q, SB
4	2	Anay Tejeda	Cuba	7.95	Q, SB
5	1	Tatyana Dektyareva	Russia	7.99	Q
6	1	Ginnie Powell	United States	7.99	Q
7	2	Lacena Golding-Clarke	Jamaica	8.01	Q
8	1	Christina Vukicevic	Norway	8.02	
9	2	Lolo Jones	United States	8.04	Q
10	2	Eline Berings	Belgium	8.05	
11	2	Aleksandra Fedoriva	Russia	8.06	
12	2	Lisa Urech	Switzerland	8.09	
13	2	Lucie Škrobáková	Czech Republic	8.13	
14	1	Nadine Hildebrand	Germany	8.17	
15	1	Alina Talay	Belarus	8.18	
16	1	Alice Decaux	France	8.23	

=== Final ===
Rank	Name	Nationality	Time	Notes
Gold medal	Lolo Jones	United States	7.72	CR, AR, WL
Silver medal	Perdita Felicien	Canada	7.86	SB
Bronze medal	Priscilla Lopes-Schliep	Canada	7.87	
4	Anay Tejeda	Cuba	7.91	SB
5	Ginnie Powell	United States	7.97	
6	Vonette Dixon	Jamaica	7.99	
7	Lacena Golding-Clarke	Jamaica	8.02	
8	Tatyana Dektyareva	Russia	8.05	
