= Athletics at the 2005 Summer Universiade – Women's 100 metres hurdles =

The women's 100 metres hurdles event at the 2005 Summer Universiade was held on 15–16 August in İzmir, Turkey.

== Medalists ==
Gold	Silver	Bronze
Mirjam Liimask; Estonia	Tatyana Pavliy; Russia	Derval O'Rourke; Ireland

== Results ==
=== Heats ===
Wind:
Heat 1: +0.6 m/s, Heat 2: -0.1 m/s, Heat 3: ? m/s, Heat 4: ? m/s

Rank	Heat	Athlete	Nationality	Time	Notes
1	4	Adrianna Lamalle	France	12.90	Q
2	3	Tatyana Pavliy	Russia	13.00	Q
3	4	Mirjam Liimask	Estonia	13.15	Q
4	3	Natalya Ivoninskaya	Kazakhstan	13.20	Q, SB
5	2	Derval O'Rourke	Ireland	13.27	Q
5	4	Johanna Halkoaho	Finland	13.27	Q
7	2	Hanna Korell	Finland	13.30	Q
8	3	Kadri Viigipuu	Estonia	13.37	Q
9	4	Ji Fangqian	China	13.40	q, SB
10	1	Sabrina Altermatt	Switzerland	13.52	Q
11	1	Anay Tejeda	Cuba	13.53	Q
12	2	Patrícia Vieira	Portugal	13.57	Q
13	2	Anna Yevdokimova	Russia	13.57	q
14	2	Eline Berings	Belgium	13.58	q
14	4	Nevin Yanıt	Turkey	13.58	q
16	1	Jelena Jotanović	Serbia and Montenegro	13.59	Q, SB
17	1	Judith Ritz	Germany	13.64	q
18	2	Micol Cattaneo	Italy	13.67	
19	2	Esen Kızıldağ	Turkey	13.73	
20	1	Elisabeth Davin	Belgium	13.78	
21	3	Han Juan	China	13.82	SB
22	1	Naïma Bentahar	Algeria	14.06	
23	4	Anastassiya Pilipenko	Kazakhstan	14.42	
24	3	Violeta Ávila	Mexico	14.43	
25	1	Leung Shuk Wa	Hong Kong	14.91	
	3	Andrea Ivančević	Croatia	DNS	

=== Semifinals ===
Wind:
Heat 1: -0.9 m/s, Heat 2: -0.7 m/s

Rank	Heat	Athlete	Nationality	Time	Notes
1	1	Tatyana Pavliy	Russia	13.02	Q
2	2	Mirjam Liimask	Estonia	13.07	Q
3	1	Derval O'Rourke	Ireland	13.09	Q
4	2	Adrianna Lamalle	France	13.18	Q
5	1	Hanna Korell	Finland	13.22	Q
6	2	Anay Tejeda	Cuba	13.38	Q
7	1	Natalya Ivoninskaya	Kazakhstan	13.45	Q
8	1	Kadri Viigipuu	Estonia	13.47	
9	2	Anna Yevdokimova	Russia	13.51	Q
10	2	Judith Ritz	Germany	13.52	
11	1	Patrícia Vieira	Portugal	13.59	
12	2	Sabrina Altermatt	Switzerland	13.63	
13	2	Johanna Halkoaho	Finland	13.69	
13	2	Jelena Jotanović	Serbia and Montenegro	13.69	
15	1	Eline Berings	Belgium	13.70	
16	2	Nevin Yanıt	Turkey	13.89	
	1	Ji Fangqian	China	DNS	

=== Final ===
Wind: +0.5 m/s

Rank	Athlete	Nationality	Time	Notes
1st place, gold medalist(s)	Mirjam Liimask	Estonia	12.96	
2nd place, silver medalist(s)	Tatyana Pavliy	Russia	13.01	
3rd place, bronze medalist(s)	Derval O'Rourke	Ireland	13.02	
4	Adrianna Lamalle	France	13.07	
5	Anay Tejeda	Cuba	13.33	
6	Hanna Korell	Finland	13.38	
7	Anna Yevdokimova	Russia	13.39	
8	Natalya Ivoninskaya	Kazakhstan	13.46	
