= 2003 European Athletics U23 Championships – Women's 100 metres hurdles =

Sports event

The women's 100 metres hurdles event at the 2003 European Athletics U23 Championships was held in Bydgoszcz, Poland, at Zawisza Stadion on 18 and 20 July.

== Medalists ==
| Gold | Susanna Kallur; Sweden |
| Silver | Nadine Hentschke; Germany |
| Bronze | Mariya Koroteyeva; Russia |

== Results ==
=== Final ===
20 July
Wind: 1.0 m/s

| Rank | Name | Nationality | Time | Notes |
|---|---|---|---|---|
| 1st place, gold medalist(s) | Susanna Kallur | Sweden | 12.88 | CR |
| 2nd place, silver medalist(s) | Nadine Hentschke | Germany | 12.89 | |
| 3rd place, bronze medalist(s) | Mariya Koroteyeva | Russia | 12.95 | |
| 4 | Derval O'Rourke | Ireland | 12.96 | |
| 5 | Justyna Oleksy | Poland | 13.01 | |
| 6 | Jenny Kallur | Sweden | 13.15 | |
| 7 | Yauhenia Valadzko | Belarus | 13.28 | |
| 8 | Marina Tomić | Slovenia | 13.37 | |

=== Semifinals ===
20 July
Qualified: first 4 in each to the Final

==== Semifinal 1 ====
Wind: -0.2 m/s

| Rank | Name | Nationality | Time | Notes |
|---|---|---|---|---|
| 1 | Susanna Kallur | Sweden | 13.02 | Q |
| 2 | Derval O'Rourke | Ireland | 13.16 | Q |
| 3 | Yauhenia Valadzko | Belarus | 13.35 | Q |
| 4 | Marina Tomić | Slovenia | 13.36 | Q |
| 5 | Mirjam Liimask | Estonia | 13.41 | |
| 6 | Agnieszka Frankowska | Poland | 13.42 | |
| 7 | Élodie Ouédraogo | Belgium | 13.57 | |
| 8 | Tina Klein | Germany | 13.81 | |

==== Semifinal 2 ====
Wind: 1.2 m/s

| Rank | Name | Nationality | Time | Notes |
|---|---|---|---|---|
| 1 | Nadine Hentschke | Germany | 12.96 | Q |
| 2 | Mariya Koroteyeva | Russia | 13.09 | Q |
| 3 | Jenny Kallur | Sweden | 13.14 | Q |
| 4 | Justyna Oleksy | Poland | 13.15 | Q |
| 5 | Lucie Martincová | Czech Republic | 13.15 | |
| 6 | Fanny Gérance | France | 13.34 | |
| 7 | Kadri Viigipuu | Estonia | 13.60 | |
| 8 | Daniela Wöckinger | Austria | 13.62 | |

=== Heats ===
18 July
Qualified: first 3 in each heat and 4 best to the Final

==== Heat 1 ====
Wind: -1.7 m/s

| Rank | Name | Nationality | Time | Notes |
|---|---|---|---|---|
| 1 | Mariya Koroteyeva | Russia | 13.14 | Q |
| 2 | Justyna Oleksy | Poland | 13.29 | Q |
| 3 | Lucie Martincová | Czech Republic | 13.39 | Q |
| 4 | Kadri Viigipuu | Estonia | 13.61 | q |
| 5 | Marie Dia | France | 13.72 | |
| 6 | Corinna Rehwagen | Germany | 13.82 | |
| 7 | Micol Cattaneo | Italy | 13.83 | |

==== Heat 2 ====
Wind: -1.4 m/s

| Rank | Name | Nationality | Time | Notes |
|---|---|---|---|---|
| 1 | Nadine Hentschke | Germany | 13.20 | Q |
| 2 | Derval O'Rourke | Ireland | 13.20 | Q |
| 3 | Jenny Kallur | Sweden | 13.29 | Q |
| 4 | Agnieszka Frankowska | Poland | 13.64 | q |
| 5 | Marie Elisabeth Maurer | Austria | 13.90 | |
| 6 | Elisabeth Davin | Belgium | 14.01 | |
| 7 | Anila Meta | Albania | 14.94 | |

==== Heat 3 ====
Wind: 1.6 m/s

| Rank | Name | Nationality | Time | Notes |
|---|---|---|---|---|
| 1 | Yauhenia Valadzko | Belarus | 13.30 | Q |
| 2 | Fanny Gérance | France | 13.34 | Q |
| 3 | Élodie Ouédraogo | Belgium | 13.44 | Q |
| 4 | Tina Klein | Germany | 13.68 | q |
| 5 | Elisabeth García | Spain | 13.72 | |
| 6 | Justyna Szulc | Poland | 13.76 | |

==== Heat 4 ====
Wind: -0.1 m/s

| Rank | Name | Nationality | Time | Notes |
|---|---|---|---|---|
| 1 | Susanna Kallur | Sweden | 12.97 | Q |
| 2 | Marina Tomić | Slovenia | 13.46 | Q |
| 3 | Mirjam Liimask | Estonia | 13.55 | Q |
| 4 | Daniela Wöckinger | Austria | 13.63 | q |
| 5 | Petra Seidlová | Czech Republic | 13.77 | |
| 6 | Emma Montell | Finland | 13.88 | |
| 7 | Arantza Loureiro | Spain | 14.00 | |

== Participation ==
According to an unofficial count, 27 athletes from 16 countries participated in the event.

- Albania (1)
- Austria (2)
- Belarus (1)
- Belgium (2)
- Czech Republic (2)
- Estonia (2)
- Finland (1)
- France (2)
- Germany (3)
- Ireland (1)
- Italy (1)
- Poland (3)
- Russia (1)
- Slovenia (1)
- Spain (2)
- Sweden (2)
