= 2004 World Junior Championships in Athletics – Women's 100 metres hurdles =

The women's 100 metres hurdles event at the 2004 World Junior Championships in Athletics was held in Grosseto, Italy, at Stadio Olimpico Carlo Zecchini on 15 and 16 July.

== Medalists ==
Gold	Ronetta Alexander; United States
Silver	Sabrina Altermatt; Switzerland
Bronze	Stephanie Lichtl; Germany

== Results ==
=== Final ===
16 July
Wind: -1.0 m/s

Rank	Name	Nationality	Time	Notes
1st place, gold medalist(s)	Ronetta Alexander	United States	13.28	
2nd place, silver medalist(s)	Sabrina Altermatt	Switzerland	13.39	
3rd place, bronze medalist(s)	Stephanie Lichtl	Germany	13.40	
4	Sally McLellan	Australia	13.41	
5	Christina Vukicevic	Norway	13.58	
6	Carolin Nytra	Germany	13.62	
7	Elisa Hakamäki	Finland	13.69	
8	Alice Decaux	France	14.69	

=== Semifinals ===
16 July

==== Semifinal 1 ====
Wind: -0.3 m/s

Rank	Name	Nationality	Time	Notes
1	Sally McLellan	Australia	13.38	Q
2	Sabrina Altermatt	Switzerland	13.45	Q
3	Stephanie Lichtl	Germany	13.48	Q
4	Carolin Nytra	Germany	13.60	Q
5	Keisha Brown	Jamaica	13.60	
6	Eline Berings	Belgium	13.92	
7	Yelena Bandina	Russia	13.94	
8	Arna Erega	Croatia	14.28	

==== Semifinal 2 ====
Wind: -0.9 m/s

Rank	Name	Nationality	Time	Notes
1	Ronetta Alexander	United States	13.42	Q
2	Alice Decaux	France	13.49	Q
3	Christina Vukicevic	Norway	13.51	Q
4	Elisa Hakamäki	Finland	13.59	Q
5	Monique Morgan	Jamaica	13.60	
6	Cindy Billaud	France	13.83	
7	Jaime Cruickshank	Canada	13.95	
8	Shantia Moss	United States	14.16	

=== Heats ===
15 July

==== Heat 1 ====
Wind: +1.0 m/s

Rank	Name	Nationality	Time	Notes
1	Sally McLellan	Australia	13.30	Q
2	Stephanie Lichtl	Germany	13.36	Q
3	Eline Berings	Belgium	13.54	Q
4	Arna Erega	Croatia	13.91	q
5	Sandra Hernanz	Spain	13.92	
6	Nevin Yanıt	Turkey	13.98	
7	Nataliya Ivoninskaya	Kazakhstan	14.12	
8	Ada Hernández	Venezuela	14.34	

==== Heat 2 ====
Wind: -0.4 m/s

Rank	Name	Nationality	Time	Notes
1	Ronetta Alexander	United States	13.43	Q
2	Elisa Hakamäki	Finland	13.70	Q
3	Keisha Brown	Jamaica	13.93	Q
4	Nicola Robinson	United Kingdom	14.03	
5	Azusa Ichiki	Japan	14.04	
6	Beata Gorzelanczyk	Poland	14.27	
7	Giulia Tessaro	Italy	14.28	

==== Heat 3 ====
Wind: +0.4 m/s

Rank	Name	Nationality	Time	Notes
1	Shantia Moss	United States	13.46	Q
2	Yelena Bandina	Russia	13.74	Q
3	Cindy Billaud	France	13.75	Q
4	Francis Keating	Canada	13.93	
5	Jenni Niittonen	Finland	14.07	
6	Veronica Borsi	Italy	14.09	
7	Christine Skodvin	Norway	14.98	
8	Zarina Islyamova	Uzbekistan	15.31	

==== Heat 4 ====
Wind: +0.2 m/s

Rank	Name	Nationality	Time	Notes
1	Sabrina Altermatt	Switzerland	13.53	Q
2	Christina Vukicevic	Norway	13.56	Q
3	Monique Morgan	Jamaica	13.59	Q
4	Carolin Nytra	Germany	13.60	q
5	Alice Decaux	France	13.62	q
6	Jaime Cruickshank	Canada	13.85	q
7	Claudia Troppa	Spain	14.22	

== Participation ==
According to an unofficial count, 30 athletes from 21 countries participated in the event.

- Australia (1)
- Belgium (1)
- Canada (2)
- Croatia (1)
- Finland (2)
- France (2)
- Germany (2)
- Italy (2)
- Jamaica (2)
- Japan (1)
- Kazakhstan (1)
- Norway (2)
- Poland (1)
- Russia (1)
- Spain (2)
- Switzerland (1)
- Turkey (1)
- United Kingdom (1)
- United States (2)
- Uzbekistan (1)
- Venezuela (1)
