= 2007 European Athletics U23 Championships – Women's 100 metres hurdles =

The women's 100 metres hurdles event at the 2007 European Athletics U23 Championships was held in Debrecen, Hungary, at Gyulai István Atlétikai Stadion on 13 and 14 July.

== Medalists ==
Gold	Nevin Yanıt; Turkey
Silver	Christina Vukicevic; Norway
Bronze	Jessica Ennis; United Kingdom

== Results ==
=== Final ===
14 July
Wind: -0.3 m/s

Rank	Name	Nationality	Time	Notes
1st place, gold medalist(s)	Nevin Yanıt	Turkey	12.90	
2nd place, silver medalist(s)	Christina Vukicevic	Norway	13.08	
3rd place, bronze medalist(s)	Jessica Ennis	United Kingdom	13.09	
4	Eline Berings	Belgium	13.12	
5	Yekaterina Shtepa	Russia	13.16	
6	Carolin Nytra	Germany	13.29	
7	Alice Decaux	France	13.38	
8	Katsiaryna Paplauskaya	Belarus	13.48	

=== Semifinals ===
13 July
Qualified: first 4 in each heat to the Final

==== Semifinal 1 ====
Wind: -1.9 m/s

Rank	Name	Nationality	Time	Notes
1	Nevin Yanıt	Turkey	12.98	Q
2	Jessica Ennis	United Kingdom	13.08	Q
3	Eline Berings	Belgium	13.25	Q
4	Katsiaryna Paplauskaya	Belarus	13.41	Q
5	Cindy Billaud	France	13.60	
6	Stephanie Lichtl	Germany	13.64	
7	Rahmatou Dramé	France	13.67	
8	Smaro Kokkinidou	Greece	13.74	

==== Semifinal 2 ====
Wind: -1.4 m/s

Rank	Name	Nationality	Time	Notes
1	Christina Vukicevic	Norway	13.27	Q
2	Carolin Nytra	Germany	13.35	Q
3	Alice Decaux	France	13.40	Q
4	Yekaterina Shtepa	Russia	13.45	Q
5	Femke van der Meij	Netherlands	13.49	
6	Svetlana Topylina	Russia	13.57	
7	Nadine Hildebrand	Germany	13.71	
8	Emma Hansson	Sweden	13.92	

=== Heats ===
13 July
Qualified: first 3 in each heat and 4 best to the Semifinale

==== Heat 1 ====
Wind: 0.6 m/s

Rank	Name	Nationality	Time	Notes
1	Nevin Yanıt	Turkey	13.03	Q
2	Jessica Ennis	United Kingdom	13.06	Q
3	Rahmatou Dramé	France	13.52	Q
3	Nadine Hildebrand	Germany	13.52	Q
5	Smaro Kokkinidou	Greece	13.82	q
6	Anne Møller	Denmark	13.85	
7	Marie Hagle	Norway	14.05	

==== Heat 2 ====
Wind: 0.2 m/s

Rank	Name	Nationality	Time	Notes
1	Christina Vukicevic	Norway	13.13	Q
2	Yekaterina Shtepa	Russia	13.25	Q
3	Katsiaryna Paplauskaya	Belarus	13.30	Q
4	Femke van der Meij	Netherlands	13.36	q
5	Emma Hansson	Sweden	13.72	q
6	Giia Lindström	Finland	13.93	
7	Kim Reuland	Luxembourg	14.01	
8	Veronica Borsi	Italy	14.10	

==== Heat 3 ====
Wind: -1.2 m/s

Rank	Name	Nationality	Time	Notes
1	Eline Berings	Belgium	13.42	Q
2	Cindy Billaud	France	13.54	Q
3	Stephanie Lichtl	Germany	13.75	Q
4	Sabrina Altermatt	Switzerland	13.94	
5	Giulia Tessaro	Italy	13.97	
6	Sonata Tamošaitytė	Lithuania	14.13	
	Ana Torrijos	Spain	DNS	

==== Heat 4 ====
Wind: -1.5 m/s

Rank	Name	Nationality	Time	Notes
1	Alice Decaux	France	13.30	Q
2	Carolin Nytra	Germany	13.42	Q
3	Svetlana Topylina	Russia	13.50	Q
4	Claudia Troppa	Spain	13.86	
5	Sara Balduchelli	Italy	13.95	
6	Johanna Sjöström	Sweden	13.97	
7	Andrea Radu	Romania	14.04	
8	Réka Csúz	Hungary	15.60	

== Participation ==
According to an unofficial count, 29 athletes from 20 countries participated in the event.

- Belarus (1)
- Belgium (1)
- Denmark (1)
- Finland (1)
- France (3)
- Germany (3)
- Greece (1)
- Hungary (1)
- Italy (3)
- Lithuania (1)
- Luxembourg (1)
- Netherlands (1)
- Norway (2)
- Romania (1)
- Russia (2)
- Spain (1)
- Sweden (2)
- Switzerland (1)
- Turkey (1)
- United Kingdom (1)
