= 2000 World Junior Championships in Athletics – Women's 100 metres hurdles =

The women's 100 metres hurdles event at the 2000 World Junior Championships in Athletics was held in Santiago, Chile, at Estadio Nacional Julio Martínez Prádanos on 17, 18 and 19 October.

== Medalists ==
Gold	Susanna Kallur; Sweden
Silver	Fanny Gérance; France
Bronze	Adriana Lamalle; France

== Results ==
=== Final ===
19 October
Wind: -1.7 m/s

Rank	Name	Nationality	Time	Notes
1st place, gold medalist(s)	Susanna Kallur	Sweden	13.02	
2nd place, silver medalist(s)	Fanny Gérance	France	13.21	
3rd place, bronze medalist(s)	Adriana Lamalle	France	13.27	
4	Toni-Ann Doyley	Jamaica	13.29	
5	Jacquie Munro	Australia	13.30	
6	Jenny Kallur	Sweden	13.30	
7	Anay Tejeda	Cuba	13.38	
8	Maíla Paula Machado	Brazil	13.50	

=== Semifinals ===
18 October

==== Semifinal 1 ====
Wind: -0.9 m/s

Rank	Name	Nationality	Time	Notes
1	Susanna Kallur	Sweden	13.03	Q
2	Fanny Gérance	France	13.25	Q
3	Maíla Paula Machado	Brazil	13.47	Q
4	Anay Tejeda	Cuba	13.55	Q
5	Daniela Wöckinger	Austria	13.68	
6	Manuela Bosco	Finland	13.69	
7	Élodie Ouédraogo	Belgium	13.76	
8	Derval O'Rourke	Ireland	13.76	

==== Semifinal 2 ====
Wind: -0.4 m/s

Rank	Name	Nationality	Time	Notes
1	Toni-Ann Doyley	Jamaica	13.33	Q
2	Jacquie Munro	Australia	13.36	Q
3	Adriana Lamalle	France	13.38	Q
4	Jenny Kallur	Sweden	13.39	Q
5	Mariya Koroteyeva	Russia	13.47	
6	Kumiko Ikeda	Japan	13.52	
7	Nadine Hentschke	Germany	13.67	
8	Yana Kasova	Bulgaria	13.68	

=== Heats ===
17 October

==== Heat 1 ====
Wind: -0.2 m/s

Rank	Name	Nationality	Time	Notes
1	Maíla Paula Machado	Brazil	13.57	Q
2	Mariya Koroteyeva	Russia	13.64	Q
3	Élodie Ouédraogo	Belgium	13.72	q
4	Andrea Miller	New Zealand	13.77	
5	Jessica Zelinka	Canada	13.81	
6	Georgina Power	Australia	13.87	
7	Jelena Jotanovic	Yugoslavia	14.26	
	Naïma Bentahar	Algeria	DNF	

==== Heat 2 ====
Wind: -1.2 m/s

Rank	Name	Nationality	Time	Notes
1	Adriana Lamalle	France	13.63	Q
2	Daniela Wöckinger	Austria	13.74	Q
3	Ashlee Williams	United States	14.04	
4	Hiroe Washizu	Japan	14.06	
5	Priscilla Lopes	Canada	14.07	
6	Sandrine Legenort	Venezuela	14.24	
7	Tsai Chih-Chieh	Chinese Taipei	14.46	
	Keitha Moseley	Barbados	DQ	

==== Heat 3 ====
Wind: -0.4 m/s

Rank	Name	Nationality	Time	Notes
1	Manuela Bosco	Finland	13.51	Q
2	Nadine Hentschke	Germany	13.62	Q
3	Kumiko Ikeda	Japan	13.63	q
4	Nicole Scherler	Switzerland	13.85	
5	Helen Worsey	United Kingdom	14.11	
6	Zhang Lu	China	14.27	
7	Nagore Iraola	Spain	14.32	
8	Lin Yueh-Chin	Chinese Taipei	14.52	

==== Heat 4 ====
Wind: +0.1 m/s

Rank	Name	Nationality	Time	Notes
1	Jenny Kallur	Sweden	13.18	Q
2	Fanny Gérance	France	13.27	Q
3	Micol Cattaneo	Italy	13.97	
4	Sira Córdoba	Colombia	13.97	
5	Camilla Hatlen	Norway	14.06	
6	Martina Makos	Croatia	14.20	
7	LaTasha Pharr	United States	14.82	

==== Heat 5 ====
Wind: +0.7 m/s

Rank	Name	Nationality	Time	Notes
1	Jacquie Munro	Australia	13.38	Q
2	Anay Tejeda	Cuba	13.53	Q
3	Arantza Loureiro	Spain	13.77	
4	Corinna Rehwagen	Germany	13.84	
5	Yelena Nikitenko	Kazakhstan	14.12	
6	Marina Tomić	Slovenia	14.25	
7	Alicia Cave	Trinidad and Tobago	14.62	
	Hamida Benhocine	Algeria	DNF	

==== Heat 6 ====
Wind: +0.6 m/s

Rank	Name	Nationality	Time	Notes
1	Susanna Kallur	Sweden	13.13	Q
2	Toni-Ann Doyley	Jamaica	13.46	Q
3	Derval O'Rourke	Ireland	13.61	q
4	Yana Kasova	Bulgaria	13.66	q
5	Francisca Guzmán	Chile	13.83	
6	Lucie Škrobáková	Czech Republic	13.86	
7	Sanna Saarman	Finland	14.03	
8	Sara McGreavy	United Kingdom	14.34	

== Participation ==
According to an unofficial count, 47 athletes from 35 countries participated in the event.

- Algeria (2)
- Australia (2)
- Austria (1)
- Barbados (1)
- Belgium (1)
- Brazil (1)
- Bulgaria (1)
- Canada (2)
- Chile (1)
- China (1)
- Chinese Taipei (2)
- Colombia (1)
- Croatia (1)
- Cuba (1)
- Czech Republic (1)
- Finland (2)
- France (2)
- Germany (2)
- Ireland (1)
- Italy (1)
- Jamaica (1)
- Japan (2)
- Kazakhstan (1)
- New Zealand (1)
- Norway (1)
- Russia (1)
- Slovenia (1)
- Spain (2)
- Sweden (2)
- Switzerland (1)
- Trinidad and Tobago (1)
- United Kingdom (2)
- United States (2)
- Venezuela (1)
- Yugoslavia (1)
