= 2001 European Athletics U23 Championships – Women's 100 metres hurdles =

The women's 100 metres hurdles event at the 2001 European Athletics U23 Championships was held in Amsterdam, Netherlands, at Olympisch Stadion on 14 and 15 July.

== Medalists ==
Gold	Susanna Kallur; Sweden
Silver	Jenny Kallur; Sweden
Bronze	Tessy Prediger; Germany

== Results ==
=== Final ===
15 July
Wind: 1.2 m/s

Rank	Name	Nationality	Time	Notes
1st place, gold medalist(s)	Susanna Kallur	Sweden	12.96	
2nd place, silver medalist(s)	Jenny Kallur	Sweden	13.19	
3rd place, bronze medalist(s)	Tessy Prediger	Germany	13.31	
4	Judith Vis	Netherlands	13.45	
5	Julie Pratt	Great Britain	13.46	
6	Mariya Korotayeva	Russia	13.48	
7	Derval O'Rourke	Ireland	13.57	
8	Joanna Bujak	France	13.90	

=== Heats ===
14 July
Qualified: first 2 in each heat and 2 best to the Final

==== Heat 1 ====
Wind: -0.3 m/s

Rank	Name	Nationality	Time	Notes
1	Jenny Kallur	Sweden	13.45	Q
2	Mariya Korotayeva	Russia	13.58	Q
3	Joanna Bujak	France	13.67	q
4	Jennifer Komoll	Germany	13.72	
5	Yevgeniya Likhuta	Belarus	13.93	
6	Élodie Ouédraogo	Belgium	14.22	

==== Heat 2 ====
Wind: -1.2 m/s

Rank	Name	Nationality	Time	Notes
1	Tessy Prediger	Germany	13.52	Q
2	Julie Pratt	Great Britain	13.71	Q
3	Yana Kasova	Bulgaria	13.75	
4	Daniela Wöckinger	Austria	13.79	
5	Arantza Loureiro	Spain	13.94	
6	Reïna-Flor Okori	France	19.68	

==== Heat 3 ====
Wind: -0.3 m/s

Rank	Name	Nationality	Time	Notes
1	Susanna Kallur	Sweden	12.95	Q, CR
2	Judith Vis	Netherlands	13.44	Q
3	Derval O'Rourke	Ireland	13.65	q
4	Fanny Gérance	France	13.78	
5	Esen Kızıldağ	Turkey	14.30	

== Participation ==
According to an unofficial count, 17 athletes from 13 countries participated in the event.

- Austria (1)
- Belarus (1)
- Belgium (1)
- Bulgaria (1)
- France (3)
- Germany (2)
- Great Britain (1)
- Ireland (1)
- Netherlands (1)
- Russia (1)
- Spain (1)
- Sweden (2)
- Turkey (1)
