= Athletics at the 2003 Summer Universiade – Women's 100 metres hurdles =

The women's 100 metres hurdles event at the 2003 Summer Universiade was held in Daegu, South Korea on 25–26 August.

== Medalists ==
Gold	Silver	Bronze
Xu Jia; China	Yevgeniya Likhuta; Belarus	Natalya Kresova; Russia

== Results ==
=== Heats ===
Wind:
Heat 1: +0.1 m/s, Heat 2: +0.1 m/s, Heat 3: +0.7 m/s

Rank	Heat	Athlete	Nationality	Time	Notes
1	1	Xu Jia	China	13.17	Q
2	1	Justyna Oleksy	Poland	13.25	Q
3	3	Natalya Kresova	Russia	13.29	Q
4	2	Marina Tomić	Slovenia	13.36	Q
5	2	Yevgeniya Likhuta	Belarus	13.39	Q
6	3	Aurore Kassambara	France	13.41	Q
7	1	Mirjam Liimask	Estonia	13.42	q
8	1	Myriam Tschomba	Belgium	13.46	q
9	1	Fanny Gérance	France	13.47	
10	2	Edit Vári	Hungary	13.48	
11	1	Hiroe Washizu	Japan	13.61	
12	2	Ji Fangqian	China	13.63	
12	3	Kadri Viigipuu	Estonia	13.63	
13	3	Gilvaneide Parrela	Brazil	13.64	
15	2	Annika Meyer	Germany	13.65	
16	2	Jacquie Munro	Australia	13.68	
17	2	Moh Siew Wei	Malaysia	13.68	
18	3	Elisabeth Davin	Belgium	13.69	
19	3	Annette Thimm	Germany	13.70	
20	3	Micol Cattaneo	Italy	13.71	
21	3	Francisca Guzmán	Chile	13.97	
22	1	Toni-Ann D'Oyley	Jamaica	13.99	
23	2	Lucilia Contreras	Mexico	14.07	

=== Final ===
Wind: -0.9 m/s

Rank	Lane	Athlete	Nationality	Time	Notes
1st place, gold medalist(s)	5	Xu Jia	China	13.29	
2nd place, silver medalist(s)	8	Yevgeniya Likhuta	Belarus	13.33	
3rd place, bronze medalist(s)	3	Natalya Kresova	Russia	13.35	
4	6	Justyna Oleksy	Poland	13.36	
5	2	Aurore Kassambara	France	13.36	
6	1	Mirjam Liimask	Estonia	13.59	
	7	Myriam Tschomba	Belgium	DNF	
	4	Marina Tomić	Slovenia	DQ	
