= Athletics at the 2009 Summer Universiade – Women's 100 metres hurdles =

The women's 100 metres hurdles event at the 2009 Summer Universiade was held on 9–10 July.

== Medalists ==
| Gold | Silver | Bronze |
|---|---|---|
| Nevin Yanıt; Turkey | Sonata Tamošaitytė; Lithuania | Andrea Miller; New Zealand |

== Results ==
=== Heats ===
Qualification: First 3 of each heat (Q) and the next 4 fastest (q) qualified for the semifinals.

Wind:
Heat 1: 0.0 m/s, Heat 2: +1.6 m/s, Heat 3: +0.4 m/s, Heat 4: +0.6 m/s

| Rank | Heat | Name | Nationality | Time | Notes |
|---|---|---|---|---|---|
| 1 | 4 | Nevin Yanıt | Turkey | 13.26 | Q |
| 2 | 4 | Sonata Tamošaitytė | Lithuania | 13.29 | Q, PB |
| 3 | 4 | Marina Andryukhina | Russia | 13.34 | Q, PB |
| 4 | 1 | Natalya Ivoninskaya | Kazakhstan | 13.36 | Q |
| 5 | 2 | Jelena Jotanović | Serbia | 13.40 | Q |
| 6 | 3 | Marina Tomić | Slovenia | 13.44 | Q |
| 7 | 3 | Laetitia Denis | France | 13.49 | Q |
| 8 | 2 | Elena Andrea Radu | Romania | 13.51 | Q |
| 9 | 4 | Lina Flórez | Colombia | 13.51 | q |
| 10 | 4 | Olympia Petsoudi | Greece | 13.59 | q |
| 11 | 3 | Zhang Rong | China | 13.62 | Q |
| 12 | 1 | Andrea Miller | New Zealand | 13.64 | Q |
| 13 | 4 | Alice Decaux | France | 13.71 | q |
| 13 | 2 | Anastassiya Soprunova | Kazakhstan | 13.71 | Q |
| 15 | 4 | Anne Muller | Denmark | 13.75 | q |
| 16 | 3 | Arna Erega | Croatia | 13.77 | |
| 17 | 1 | Sara Balduchelli | Italy | 13.79 | Q |
| 18 | 3 | Adja Arette Ndiaye | Senegal | 13.80 | |
| 19 | 1 | Maja Pisić | Serbia | 13.99 | PB |
| 20 | 2 | Jeimy Bernárdez | Honduras | 14.06 | PB |
| 21 | 1 | Sun Minjing | China | 14.08 | SB |
| 22 | 2 | Gorana Cvijetić | Bosnia and Herzegovina | 14.13 | PB |
| 23 | 2 | Moa Larsson | Sweden | 14.35 | |
| 24 | 1 | Abigail Amoah Aduse | Ghana | 15.58 | PB |
| 25 | 3 | Thulasi Weerasekara | Sri Lanka | 16.17 | |
| — | 1 | Kristina Damyanova | Bulgaria | DNS | |
| — | 3 | Jessica Ohanaja | Nigeria | DNS | |

=== Semifinals ===
Qualification: First 3 of each semifinal (Q) and the next 2 fastest (q) qualified for the finals.

Wind:
Heat 1: +0.5 m/s, Heat 2: −0.3 m/s

| Rank | Heat | Name | Nationality | Time | Notes |
|---|---|---|---|---|---|
| 1 | 1 | Nevin Yanıt | Turkey | 13.16 | Q |
| 2 | 1 | Andrea Miller | New Zealand | 13.23 | Q |
| 3 | 2 | Natalya Ivoninskaya | Kazakhstan | 13.28 | Q |
| 3 | 1 | Sonata Tamošaitytė | Lithuania | 13.28 | Q, PB |
| 5 | 1 | Marina Andryukhina | Russia | 13.33 | q, PB |
| 6 | 1 | Alice Decaux | France | 13.36 | q, SB |
| 7 | 2 | Laetitia Denis | France | 13.42 | Q |
| 8 | 1 | Marina Tomić | Slovenia | 13.43 | SB |
| 9 | 2 | Jelena Jotanović | Serbia | 13.44 | Q |
| 10 | 2 | Lina Flórez | Colombia | 13.48 | |
| 11 | 1 | Anastassiya Soprunova | Kazakhstan | 13.55 | |
| 12 | 2 | Olympia Petsoudi | Greece | 13.57 | |
| 13 | 2 | Sara Balduchelli | Italy | 13.61 | PB |
| 14 | 2 | Zhang Rong | China | 13.66 | |
| 15 | 2 | Elena Andrea Radu | Romania | 13.68 | |
| 16 | 1 | Anne Muller | Denmark | 13.95 | |

=== Final ===
Wind: +1.5 m/s

| Rank | Lane | Name | Nationality | Time | Notes |
|---|---|---|---|---|---|
| 1st place, gold medalist(s) | 6 | Nevin Yanıt | Turkey | 12.89 | |
| 2nd place, silver medalist(s) | 7 | Sonata Tamošaitytė | Lithuania | 13.10 | PB |
| 3rd place, bronze medalist(s) | 3 | Andrea Miller | New Zealand | 13.13 | |
| 4 | 4 | Natalya Ivoninskaya | Kazakhstan | 13.18 | |
| 5 | 8 | Jelena Jotanović | Serbia | 13.19 | NR |
| 6 | 2 | Marina Andryukhina | Russia | 13.28 | PB |
| 7 | 5 | Laetitia Denis | France | 13.36 | SB |
| — | 1 | Alice Decaux | France | DNF | |
