= 2011 European Athletics Indoor Championships – Women's 60 metres hurdles =

The women's 60 metres hurdles event at the 2011 European Athletics Indoor Championships was held on 4 March with the final being held 18:40 local time.

== Records ==
Standing records prior to the 2011 European Athletics Indoor Championships
World record	Susanna Kallur (SWE)	7.68	Karlsruhe, Germany	10 February 2008
European record	Susanna Kallur (SWE)	7.68	Karlsruhe, Germany	10 February 2008
Championship record	Lyudmila Narozhilenko (URS)	7.74	Glasgow, United Kingdom	4 March 1990
World Leading	Kellie Wells (USA)	7.79	Albuquerque, United States	27 February 2011
European Leading	Christina Vukicevic (NOR)	7.90	Karlsruhe, Germany	13 February 2011

== Results ==
=== Heats ===
First 3 in each heat and 4 best performers advanced to the Semifinals. The heats were held at 09:20.

Rank	Heat	Name	Nationality	React	Time	Notes
1	2	Christina Vukicevic	Norway	0.157	7.95	Q
2	4	Carolin Nytra	Germany	0.190	7.96	Q
3	2	Tiffany Ofili	Great Britain	0.187	8.05	Q
4	1	Alina Talay	Belarus	0.180	8.06	Q, PB
5	1	Lisa Urech	Switzerland	0.183	8.07	Q
5	4	Derval O'Rourke	Ireland	0.156	8.07	Q
7	4	Elisabeth Davin	Belgium	0.198	8.08	Q, SB
8	2	Cindy Roleder	Germany	0.186	8.09	Q
9	3	Aleksandra Antonova	Russia	0.205	8.11	Q
9	4	Anastasiya Solovyova	Russia	0.209	8.11	q
11	3	Sandra Gomis	France	0.195	8.12	Q
12	1	Lucie Škrobáková	Czech Republic	0.211	8.17	Q
13	2	Marina Tomić	Slovenia	0.159	8.18	q
14	3	Katsiaryna Paplauskaya	Belarus	0.168	8.19	Q, =SB
15	3	Nadine Hildebrand	Germany	0.202	8.20	q
16	1	Alice Decaux	France	0.176	8.22	q
17	4	Clélia Reuse	Switzerland	0.184	8.24	
18	1	Beate Schrott	Austria	0.238	8.25	
18	2	Giulia Pennella	Italy	0.182	8.25	
20	3	Josephine Onyia	Spain	0.193	8.33	
21	1	Isabelle Pedersen	Norway	0.207	8.38	
22	2	Andrea Ivančević	Croatia	0.213	8.43	
23	3	Dimitra Arachoviti	Cyprus	0.191	8.43	
24	4	Arna Erega	Croatia	0.195	8.62	
25	2	Gorana Cvijetić	Bosnia and Herzegovina	0.204	8.68	PB

=== Semifinals ===
First 4 in each heat advanced to the Final. The semifinals were held at 15:45.

Rank	Heat	Name	Nationality	React	Time	Notes
1	2	Tiffany Ofili	Great Britain	0.149	7.89	Q, NR, EL
2	2	Christina Vukicevic	Norway	0.146	7.93	Q
3	1	Carolin Nytra	Germany	0.187	7.94	Q
4	1	Alina Talay	Belarus	0.178	7.95	Q, PB
5	2	Aleksandra Antonova	Russia	0.166	7.96	Q
6	1	Derval O'Rourke	Ireland	0.154	7.98	Q, SB
7	1	Lucie Škrobáková	Czech Republic	0.206	8.00	Q, SB
7	2	Sandra Gomis	France	0.179	8.00	Q, =PB
9	1	Anastasiya Solovyova	Russia	0.192	8.02	=SB
9	2	Elisabeth Davin	Belgium	0.196	8.02	PB
11	1	Lisa Urech	Switzerland	0.190	8.06	
11	2	Cindy Roleder	Germany	0.189	8.06	
13	2	Katsiaryna Paplauskaya	Belarus	0.183	8.14	SB
14	1	Marina Tomić	Slovenia	0.163	8.21	
15	2	Nadine Hildebrand	Germany	0.194	8.23	
—N/a	1	Alice Decaux	France	0.178	DSQ	

=== Final ===
The final was held at 18:40.

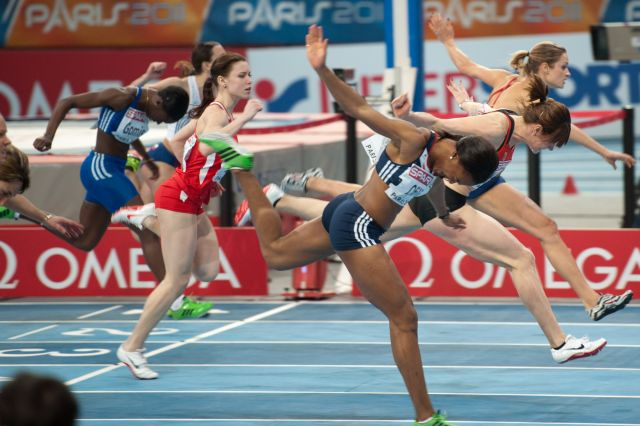
The finish of the final.

Rank	Lane	Name	Nationality	React	Time	Notes
1st place, gold medalist(s)	5	Carolin Nytra	Germany	0.179	7.80	EL
2nd place, silver medalist(s)	6	Tiffany Ofili	Great Britain	0.171	7.80	NR, =EL
3rd place, bronze medalist(s)	3	Christina Vukicevic	Norway	0.166	7.83	NR
4	8	Derval O'Rourke	Ireland	0.164	7.96	SB
5	4	Alina Talay	Belarus	0.195	7.98	
6	7	Aleksandra Antonova	Russia	0.208	8.00	
7	1	Lucie Škrobáková	Czech Republic	0.220	8.10	
8	2	Sandra Gomis	France	0.202	8.11	
