= 1998 World Junior Championships in Athletics – Women's 100 metres hurdles =

The women's 100 metres hurdles event at the 1998 World Junior Championships in Athletics was held in Annecy, France, at Parc des Sports on 1 and 2 August.

== Medalists ==
Gold	Julie Pratt; United Kingdom
Silver	Sun Hong Wei; China
Bronze	Susanna Kallur; Sweden

== Results ==
=== Final ===
2 August
Wind: -1.0 m/s

Rank	Name	Nationality	Time	Notes
1st place, gold medalist(s)	Julie Pratt	United Kingdom	13.75	
2nd place, silver medalist(s)	Sun Hong Wei	China	13.75	
3rd place, bronze medalist(s)	Susanna Kallur	Sweden	13.77	
4	Arnella Jacobs	South Africa	13.79	
5	Manuela Bosco	Finland	13.83	
6	Jennifer Komoll	Germany	13.94	
7	Fanny Gérance	France	13.97	
8	Baya Rahouli	Algeria	14.05	

=== Heats ===
1 August

==== Heat 1 ====
Wind: -1.8 m/s

Rank	Name	Nationality	Time	Notes
1	Sun Hong Wei	China	13.71	Q
2	Manuela Bosco	Finland	13.77	Q
3	Tessy Prediger	Germany	13.78	
4	Daveetta Shepherd	United States	13.91	
5	Jacquie Munro	Australia	14.06	
6	Diana Bulatova	Russia	14.25	
7	Lee Yeon-Gyeong	South Korea	14.61	

==== Heat 2 ====
Wind: +0.1 m/s

Rank	Name	Nationality	Time	Notes
1	Arnella Jacobs	South Africa	13.52	Q
2	Julie Pratt	United Kingdom	13.61	Q
3	Fanny Gérance	France	13.72	q
4	Hanna Korell	Finland	13.86	
5	Alexándra Kómnou	Greece	13.87	
6	Yana Kasova	Bulgaria	13.98	
7	Lutisha Shittu	United States	14.39	
8	Verónica Quijano	El Salvador	15.11	

==== Heat 3 ====
Wind: -1.3 m/s

Rank	Name	Nationality	Time	Notes
1	Baya Rahouli	Algeria	13.50	Q
2	Susanna Kallur	Sweden	13.52	Q
3	Jennifer Komoll	Germany	13.59	q
4	Reïna-Flor Okori	France	13.73	
5	Marilia Gregoriou	Cyprus	13.77	
6	Sarah Claxton	United Kingdom	14.00	
7	Nagore Iraola	Spain	14.28	
8	Huh Soon-Bok	South Korea	14.36	

== Participation ==
According to an unofficial count, 23 athletes from 17 countries participated in the event.

- Algeria (1)
- Australia (1)
- Bulgaria (1)
- China (1)
- Cyprus (1)
- El Salvador (1)
- Finland (2)
- France (2)
- Germany (2)
- Greece (1)
- Russia (1)
- South Africa (1)
- South Korea (2)
- Spain (1)
- Sweden (1)
- United Kingdom (2)
- United States (2)
