= 2002 World Junior Championships in Athletics – Women's 100 metres hurdles =

The women's 100 metres hurdles event at the 2002 World Junior Championships in Athletics was held in Kingston, Jamaica, at National Stadium on 19 and 20 July.

== Medalists ==
Gold	Anay Tejeda; Cuba
Silver	Agnieszka Frankowska; Poland
Bronze	Tina Klein; Germany

== Results ==
=== Final ===
19 July
Wind: +3.4 m/s

Rank	Name	Nationality	Time	Notes
1st place, gold medalist(s)	Anay Tejeda	Cuba	12.81 w	
2nd place, silver medalist(s)	Agnieszka Frankowska	Poland	13.16 w	
3rd place, bronze medalist(s)	Tina Klein	Germany	13.23 w	
4	Ashlee Williams	United States	13.36 w	
5	Melaine Walker	Jamaica	13.66 w	
6	Olga Samylova	Russia	13.72 w	
7	Mirjam Liimask	Estonia	13.80 w	
8	Marie Elisabeth Maurer	Austria	15.70 w	

=== Heats ===
20 July

==== Heat 1 ====
Wind: +0.4 m/s

Rank	Name	Nationality	Time	Notes
1	Agnieszka Frankowska	Poland	13.24	Q
2	Olga Samylova	Russia	13.29	Q
3	Marie Elisabeth Maurer	Austria	13.31	q
4	Tiffany Ross	United States	13.78	
5	Darcelle McCutcheon	Canada	14.02	
6	Sandrine Legenort	Venezuela	14.37	
7	Dóra Horváth	Hungary	14.41	
	Elisabet García	Spain	DNF	

==== Heat 2 ====
Wind: +0.3 m/s

Rank	Name	Nationality	Time	Notes
1	Ashlee Williams	United States	13.44	Q
2	Melaine Walker	Jamaica	13.51	Q
3	Mirjam Liimask	Estonia	13.72	q
4	Marina Tomić	Slovenia	13.74	
5	Andrea Ivančević	Croatia	13.86	
6	Sylvia Krause	Germany	14.10	
7	Eliána Durkó	Hungary	14.14	
8	Gnima Faye	Senegal	15.07	

==== Heat 3 ====
Wind: +0.1 m/s

Rank	Name	Nationality	Time	Notes
1	Anay Tejeda	Cuba	13.07	Q
2	Tina Klein	Germany	13.20	Q
3	Gemma Fergusson	United Kingdom	13.81	
4	Kasia Williams	Jamaica	14.19	
5	Zolymar Febles	Puerto Rico	14.24	
6	Chiara Da Rin	Italy	14.43	
7	Sarah Dosen	Australia	14.46	
	Justyna Oleksy	Poland	DQ	

== Participation ==
According to an unofficial count, 24 athletes from 19 countries participated in the event.

- Australia (1)
- Austria (1)
- Canada (1)
- Croatia (1)
- Cuba (1)
- Estonia (1)
- Germany (2)
- Hungary (2)
- Italy (1)
- Jamaica (2)
- Poland (2)
- Puerto Rico (1)
- Russia (1)
- Senegal (1)
- Slovenia (1)
- Spain (1)
- United Kingdom (1)
- United States (2)
- Venezuela (1)
