= Natalya Ivoninskaya =

Kazakhstani hurdler (born 1985)

Medal record

Women's athletics

Representing Kazakhstan

Asian Indoor Championships
| Silver medal – second place | 2006 Pattaya | 60 m hurdles |
| Silver medal – second place | 2012 Hangzhou | 60 m hurdles |

Natalya Ivoninskaya (born 22 February 1985 in Astana) is a Kazakhstani hurdler. (Note: "Natalya Ivoninskaya". London 2012. The London Organising Committee of the Olympic Games and Paralympic Games Limited.) At the 2008 and 2012 Summer Olympics, she competed in the Women's 100 metres hurdles.

== International competitions ==
| Year | Competition | Venue | Position | Event | Notes |
Representing Kazakhstan
| 2001 | World Youth Championships | Debrecen, Hungary | 14th (sf) | 100 m hurdles | 14.53 |
| 2004 | Asian Junior Championships | Ipoh, Malaysia | 1st | 100 m hurdles | 13.92 |
| 2004 | World Junior Championships | Grosseto, Italy | 25th (h) | 100 m hurdles | 14.12 (wind: +1.0 m/s) |
| 2005 | Universiade | İzmir, Turkey | 8th | 100 m hurdles | 13.46 |
| 2005 | Asian Championships | Incheon, South Korea | 5th | 100 m hurdles | 13.62 |
| 2005 | Asian Indoor Games | Pattaya, Thailand | 2nd | 60 m hurdles | 8.41 |
| 2006 | Asian Indoor Championships | Pattaya, Thailand | 2nd | 60 m hurdles | 8.49 |
| 2006 | Asian Games | Doha, Qatar | 4th | 100 m hurdles | 13.27 |
| 2007 | Universiade | Bangkok, Thailand | 5th | 100 m hurdles | 13.13 |
| 2007 | World Championships | Osaka, Japan | 27th (h) | 100 m hurdles | 13.12 |
| 2007 | Asian Indoor Games | Macau | 1st | 60 m hurdles | 8.33 |
| 2008 | Olympic Games | Beijing, China | 27th (h) | 100 m hurdles | 13.20 |
| 2009 | Universiade | Belgrade, Serbia | 4th | 100 m hurdles | 13.18 |
| 2009 | World Championships | Berlin, Germany | 29th (h) | 100 m hurdles | 13.41 |
| 2009 | Asian Indoor Games | Hanoi, Vietnam | 2nd | 60 m hurdles | 8.38 |
| 2009 | Asian Championships | Guangzhou, China | 7th | 100 m hurdles | 13.65 |
| 2010 | Asian Games | Guangzhou, China | 2nd | 100 m hurdles | 13.24 |
| 2011 | Asian Championships | Kobe, Japan | 3rd | 100 m hurdles | 13.15 |
| 2011 | Universiade | Shenzhen, China | 2nd | 100 m hurdles | 13.16 |
| 2011 | World Championships | Daegu, South Korea | 15th (sf) | 100 m hurdles | 12.96 |
| 2012 | Asian Indoor Championships | Hangzhou, China | 2nd | 60 m hurdles | 8.29 |
| 2012 | World Indoor Championships | Istanbul, Turkey | 23rd (h) | 60 m hurdles | 8.49 |
| 2012 | Olympic Games | London, United Kingdom | 30th (h) | 100 m hurdles | 13.48 |
| 2013 | Universiade | Kazan, Russia | 8th (h) | 100 m hurdles | 13.42 |
| 2014 | World Indoor Championships | Sopot, Poland | 28th (h) | 60 m hurdles | 8.44 |
