= Yevgeniya Snihur =

Ukrainian hurdler

Yevgeniya Snihur (born March 7, 1984, in Kyiv Oblast) is a Ukrainian track and field athlete who specialises in the 100 metres hurdles.

== Achievements ==
Year	Competition	Venue	Position	Event	Notes
Representing Ukraine
2005	European U23 Championships	Erfurt, Germany	10th (h)	100m hurdles	13.57 (wind: -0.3 m/s)
2007	Universiade	Bangkok, Thailand	3rd	100 m hurdles	13.08
2007	World Championships	Osaka, Japan	21st (h)	100 m hurdles	13.01
2007	Military World Games	Hyderabad, India	1st	100 m hurdles	13.23
2008	World Indoor Championships	Valencia, Spain	6th	60 m hurdles	8.12
2008	Summer Olympics	Beijing, China	21st	100 m hurdles	13.06
2010	World Indoor Championships	Doha, Qatar	18th	60 metres hurdles	8.22
2010	European Championships	Barcelona, Spain	5th	100 metres hurdles	12.92
