= Laetitia Denis =

French hurdler

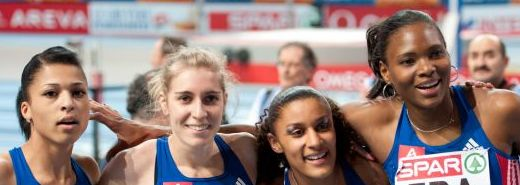
France 4 x 400 m relay at the 2011 European Athletics Indoor Championships in Paris. Floria Guei, Marie Gayot, Lætitia Denis, Muriel Hurtis-Houairi.

Laetitia Denis (born 4 February 1988 in Yaoundé, Cameroon) is a French athlete specializing in the 400 metres hurdles.

== Biography ==
A versatile athlete, she made her debut in the heptathlon by finishing sixth of the 2005 Cadet World Championships with a total of 5402 points. She won in 2006 the junior national titles in the 400m hurdles and the 60m hurdles, and became vice-European champion in the 110m hurdles in 2007. Junior champion of France at the 110m hurdles in 2008, she won the bronze medal in the relay 4 × 400 m at the 2009 Summer Universiade.

In March 2011, Laetitia Denis won the relay bronze medal for the 4 × 400 m at the European Indoor Championships in Paris-Bercy alongside Muriel Hurtis-Houairi, Floria Gueï and Marie Gayot. The French team ran a time of 3 min 32 s 16 losing that day to Russia and the UK .

== Achievements ==
Year	Competition	Venue	Position	Event	Notes
Representing France
2006	World Junior Championships	Beijing, China	14th (sf)	400m hurdles	58.55
2006	World Junior Championships	Beijing, China	8th (h)	4×400m relay	3:39.28
2007	European Junior Championships	Hengelo, Netherlands	2nd	100 m hurdles	13.35
2007	Universiade	Bangkok, Thailand	12th (sf)	100 m hurdles	13.51
2009	Universiade	Belgrade, Serbia	7th	100 m hurdles	13.36
2009	Universiade	Belgrade, Serbia	3rd	4 x 100 m relay	44.31
2009	European U23 Championships	Kaunas, Lithuania	12th (sf)	400m hurdles	58.04
2009	Jeux de la Francophonie	Beirut, Lebanon	5th	400 m hurdles	58.99
2010	European Championships	Barcelona, Spain	6th	4 x 400 m relay	3:27.44 (h)
2011	European Indoor Championships	Paris, France	3rd	4 x 400 m relay	3:32.16

=== Personal Bests ===
Event	Performance	Location	Date
400 m hurdles	57 s 40	Angers	25 July 2009
400 m Indoor	53 s 29	Paris	28 February 2010

== Bibliography ==
- Laetitia Denis at World Athletics
