= Yana Kasova =

Bulgarian hurdler (born 1981)

Medal record

Women's athletics

Representing Bulgaria

European Championships
Bronze medal – third place	2002 Munich	100 m hurdles

Yana Kasova (Bulgarian: Яна Касова; born 13 August 1981) is a Bulgarian former track and field athlete who specialised in the 100 metres hurdles. Her personal best for the event is 12.75 seconds. She was the bronze medallist at the 2002 European Athletics Championships.

== Career ==
She made her international debut at age sixteen at the 1998 World Junior Championships in Athletics, competing in the heats only. She returned two years later at the 2000 World Junior Championships in Athletics and was a semi-finalist. That same year she won the national title in the 100 m hurdles and the 60 metres hurdles indoors. She failed to defend these titles in 2001 and did not have much success internationally either, as she did not get past the heats at the 2001 European Athletics U23 Championships.

Kasova won the third and last of her national titles at the Bulgarian Indoor Championships at the start of 2002. Her career breakthrough came at the 2002 European Cup B Final, where she won the 100 m hurdles in a new personal best of 12.75 seconds. This time ranked her tenth in the world for that year, and third among Europeans. Desislava Mutafchieva was the winner at the Bulgarian Championships that year, but at the 2002 European Athletics Championships Kasova came away with the bronze medal. She again dipped under thirteen seconds and was beaten only by Spanish-Nigerian Glory Alozie and Ukraine's Olena Krasovska.

The following year she ran 12.95 seconds at the start of June (ultimately ranking in the global top forty that season). However, this proved to be the last time she ran that fast, as she suffered a severe injury to her left foot during training, breaking the bone and having surgery as a result. She attempted a return, but additional complications forced her to retire from athletics.

She finished her career ranking fourth on the all-time Bulgarian rankings for the 100 m hurdles, behind world record breakers Yordanka Donkova, Ginka Zagorcheva and world medallist Svetla Dimitrova.

== National titles ==
- Bulgarian Athletics Championships
  - 100 m hurdles: 2000
- Bulgarian Indoor Championships
  - 60 m hurdles: 2000, 2002

== International competitions ==
Year	Competition	Venue	Position	Event	Notes
1998	World Junior Championships	Annecy, France	6th (heats)	100 m hurdles	13.98
2000	World Junior Championships	Santiago, Chile	8th (semis)	100 m hurdles	13.68
2001	European U23 Championships	Amsterdam, Netherlands	3rd (heats)	100 m hurdles	13.75
2002	European Cup B Final	Banská Bystrica, Slovakia	1st	100 m hurdles	12.75
2002	European Championships	Munich, Germany	3rd	100 m hurdles	12.91

== See also ==
- List of European Athletics Championships medalists (women)
