= Jenny Kallur =

Swedish track and field athlete

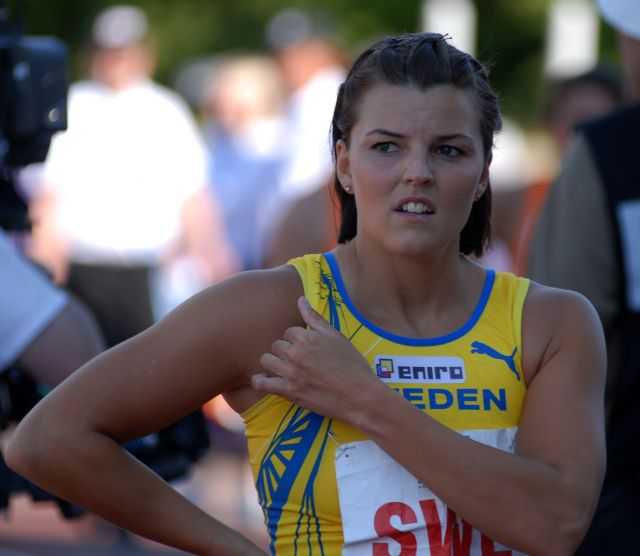
- Kallur in 2008

Personal information
- Born: 16 February 1981 (age 45) Huntington, New York, U.S.

Jenny Kallur
Medal record

Representing Sweden

European Indoor Championships
Silver medal – second place	2005 Madrid	60 m hurdles

World Junior Championships
Bronze medal – third place	2000 Santiago	4 x 100 m relay

Jenny Margareta Kallur (Swedish pronunciation: [ˈjɛ̌nːʏ ˈkǎlːɵr]; born 16 February 1981) is a Swedish former track and field athlete who competed in hurdling and sprinting events. Her twin sister Susanna Kallur, who is four minutes younger, is also a 100 m hurdler. She was coached by Torbjörn Eriksson and Anders Henriksson.

Her first athletic successes came as a young athlete: she won the 100 metres title at the European Youth Olympic Festival in 1997 and took a bronze medal in the sprint relay at the 2000 World Junior Championships in Athletics, setting a Swedish junior record. She made successive appearances on the European, World and Olympic stage from 2002 to 2004.

Her best performances came in 2005, when she won the silver medal at the European Athletics Indoor Championships behind her sister and then teamed up with her to run a Swedish national record in the 4×100 metres relay at the 2005 World Championships in Athletics (where she was sixth in the hurdles final). She reached the hurdles finals at both the 2006 IAAF World Indoor Championships and the 2006 European Athletics Championships, but injuries brought her career to a halt in 2007, eventually resulting in her retirement from the sport in 2011.

She won 100/200 m sprint doubles at the 1998 and 2002 Swedish National Championships, and won a fifth outdoor title in the 100 m hurdles in 2006. She is also a three-time Swedish champion indoors, having won the 60 metres title in 2004 and the 200 metres title in 1998 and 2000.

== Career ==
=== Junior and collegiate career ===
Kallur studied at the University of Illinois and competed collegiately for the Fighting Illini. In 2001, she was seventh in the 100 m hurdles at the Outdoor NCAA Championships and came fourth in the final at the Big Ten Conference meet, where she was also sixth over 200 metres and runner-up in the 4×100 metres relay. At the 2001 Drake Relays she helped set a world record in the rarely contested 4×100 metres shuttle hurdle relay.

Internationally, she began her career as a junior athlete by winning the 100 metres title at the 1997 European Youth Olympic Festival. She reached the semi-finals of the 200 m at the 1998 World Junior Championships in Athletics and at the 1999 European Athletics Junior Championships she was a finalist in the 100, 200 and sprint relay events. She ran at the next edition of the world competition in 2000 and, after coming sixth in the 100 m hurdles, she claimed her first medal with the Swedish women's 4×100 m relay team. Alongside Linda Fernström, Emma Rienas and her twin Susanna, she took the bronze medal with a national junior record of 44.78 seconds.

=== Senior competition ===
She moved up an age level to take part in the 2001 European Athletics U23 Championships and she won the silver medal in the 100 m hurdles, finishing behind her sister. Her major senior debut came at the 2002 European Athletics Championships, but she failed to make it beyond the heats stage of either the 200 m or hurdles competitions. She was chosen for the Swedish relay team at the 2003 World Championships in Athletics, but the Swedes failed to finish their race.

Kallur made her global indoor debut at the 2004 IAAF World Indoor Championships and reached the semi-finals of the 60 metres hurdles. An Olympic debut followed later that year, but she did not progress beyond the heats, coming fifth in the hurdles at the 2004 Athens Olympics. She ended her year with two career bests in the sprints in Gothenburg, running 11.43 seconds for the 100 m and 23.26 for the 200 m.

=== European medallist ===
The 2005 season provided her career highlights, starting with a career best run of 7.92 seconds in the 60 m hurdles in February and then a silver medal at the 2005 European Athletics Indoor Championships behind Susanna Kallur. At the beginning of the outdoor season, she won the 200 m gold medal and 100 m silver at the 2006 European Cup. She was chosen to represent Sweden in the hurdles at the 2005 World Championships in Athletics and she ran a career best of 12.85 seconds to make her first major outdoor final. She came sixth in the hurdles final and later ran a Swedish record of 43.67 seconds in the 4×100 m relay, in a team comprising the Kallur twins, Emma Rienas and Carolina Klüft.

Her good form continued into 2006, where she was a hurdles finalist at the 2006 IAAF World Indoor Championships and the 2006 European Athletics Championships, as well as part of the fifth-placed relay team at the Europeans. The next year she was selected for the 2007 World Championships in Athletics but she finished last in her heat in what would be her final appearance on the international stage.

=== Injury and retirement ===
Kallur suffered a stress fracture in September 2007 and missed the 2008 season. It had not healed by February 2008 and she opted for surgery, which eventually ruled her out for the 2009 season as well. Her sister Susanna also had a similar injury, raising the suspicion that it may have been caused by their training programme. Kallur's injuries continued to persist and when a separate foot problem emerged in 2011 she decided to call an end to her athletics career at the age of thirty. Following her track career, she focused on training to be an advertising copywriter.

== Personal life ==
Jenny Kallur and her sister Susanna are daughters of former ice hockey player Anders Kallur, who won four Stanley Cup championships with the New York Islanders. Since she was born in Huntington, New York, U.S., she has dual citizenship. She is a resident of Falun, in Sweden. In 2005, she and Swedish tennis professional Joachim Johansson announced they were a couple but in August 2008 they separated.

== Best performances ==
=== 2006 ===
- 2006 European Championships (Göteborg)

(100m Hurdles) Final, 7th Place

=== 2005 ===
- 28th European Indoor Athletics Championships (Madrid)

(60m Hurdles) Silver Medal (7.99), making it a double win for the twins.

- European Cup First League Group A (Gävle)

(200 m) Gold Medal (23.47)

- 10th IAAF World Championships in Athletics (Helsinki)

(100m Hurdles) Final, 6th Place, (12.95)

=== 2000 ===
- IAAF/Coca-Cola World Junior Championships (Santiago de Chile)

(100 metres Hurdles) Final, 6th Place, (13.30)
(Relay) Bronze Medal

== Competition record ==
Year	Competition	Venue	Position	Event	Notes
Representing Sweden
1998	World Junior Championships	Annecy, France	13th (h)	200 m	24.01 (wind: -0.7 m/s)
1999	European Junior Championships	Riga, Latvia	7th	100 m	11.93
1999	European Junior Championships	Riga, Latvia	5th	200 m	23.71
1999	European Junior Championships	Riga, Latvia	5th	4 × 100 m relay	45.42
2000	World Junior Championships	Santiago, Chile	6th	100 m hurdles	13.30 (wind: -1.7 m/s)
2000	World Junior Championships	Santiago, Chile	3rd	4 × 100 m relay	44.78
2001	European U23 Championships	Amsterdam, Netherlands	2nd	100 m hurdles	13.19 (wind: 1.2 m/s)
2002	European Championships	Munich, Germany	22nd (h)	200 m	23.96
2002	European Championships	Munich, Germany	24th (h)	100 m hurdles	13.48
2002	European Championships	Munich, Germany	11th (h)	4 × 100 m relay	44.33
2003	European U23 Championships	Bydgoszcz, Poland	6th	100 m hurdles	13.15 (wind: 1.0 m/s)
2003	World Championships	Paris, France	–	4 × 100 m relay	DNF
2004	World Indoor Championships	Budapest, Hungary	12th (sf)	60 m hurdles	8.03
2004	Olympic Games	Athens, Greece	21st (h)	100 m hurdles	13.11
2005	European Indoor Championships	Madrid, Spain	2nd	60 m hurdles	7.99
2005	World Championships	Helsinki, Finland	6th	100 m hurdles	12.95
2005	World Championships	Helsinki, Finland	11th (h)	4 × 100 m relay	43.67
2006	World Indoor Championships	Moscow, Russia	8th	60 m hurdles	7.98
2006	European Championships	Gothenburg, Sweden	7th	100 m hurdles	12.94
2006	European Championships	Gothenburg, Sweden	5th	4 × 100 m relay	44.16
2007	World Championships	Osaka, Japan	25th (h)	100 m hurdles	13.08

== Personal bests ==
- 60 metres hurdles: 7.92 secs
- 100 metres: 11.43 secs
- 200 metres: 23.26 secs
- 100 metres hurdles: 12.85 secs
