= Elisabeth Davin =

Belgian hurdler (born 1981)

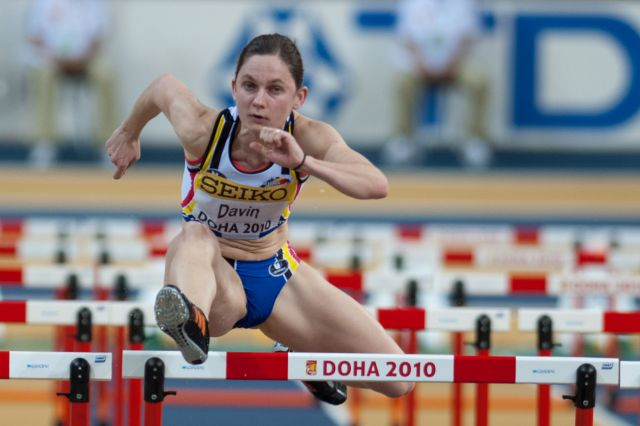
- Elisabeth Davin in 2010

Personal information
- Born: 3 June 1981 Virton, Belgium
- Height: 1.70 m (5 ft 7 in)
- Weight: 55 kg (121 lb)

Sport
- Sport: Athletics
- Event: 100 m hurdles
- Club: Dampicourt
- Coached by: Alain Hoffelt; JP Bourdon

Elisabeth Davin (born 3 June 1981) is a Belgian athlete specialising in the sprint hurdles. She represented her country at the 2009 World Championships and 2010 IAAF World Indoor Championships without advancing from the first round. In addition, she won a gold medal at the 2009 Jeux de la Francophonie.

Her personal bests are 12.97 seconds in the 100 metres hurdles (+0.4 m/s, La Chaux-de-Fonds 2009) and 8.02 seconds in the 60 metres hurdles (Paris 2011).

== International competitions ==
Year	Competition	Venue	Position	Event	Notes
Representing Belgium
2003	European U23 Championships	Bydgoszcz, Poland	26th (h)	100 m hurdles	14.01
2003	European U23 Championships	Bydgoszcz, Poland	7th	4 × 100 m relay	44.94
2003	Universiade	Daegu, South Korea	7th (qf)	100 m	12.27
2003	Universiade	Daegu, South Korea	18th (h)	100 m hurdles	13.69
2005	Universiade	İzmir, Turkey	14th (sf)	100 m	12.00
2005	Universiade	İzmir, Turkey	20th (h)	100 m hurdles	13.78
2005	Jeux de la Francophonie	Niamey, Niger	9th (sf)	100 m	12.13
2005	Jeux de la Francophonie	Niamey, Niger	3rd	100 m hurdles	13.65
2009	European Indoor Championships	Turin, Italy	9th (sf)	60 m hurdles	8.07
2009	World Championships	Berlin, Germany	–	100 m hurdles	DNF
2009	Jeux de la Francophonie	Beirut, Lebanon	1st	100 m hurdles	13.32
2010	World Indoor Championships	Doha, Qatar	19th (h)	60 m hurdles	8.23
2010	European Championships	Barcelona, Spain	13th (sf)	100 m hurdles	13.15
2011	European Indoor Championships	Paris, France	9th (sf)	60 m hurdles	8.02
