= 2005 European Athletics U23 Championships – Women's 100 metres hurdles =

The women's 100 metres hurdles event at the 2005 European Athletics U23 Championships was held in Erfurt, Germany, at Steigerwaldstadion on 15 and 17 July.

== Medalists ==
Gold	Mirjam Liimask; Estonia
Silver	Tina Klein; Germany
Bronze	Anna Yevdokimova; Russia

== Results ==
=== Final ===
17 July
Wind: 0.9 m/s

Rank	Name	Nationality	Time	Notes
1st place, gold medalist(s)	Mirjam Liimask	Estonia	12.93	NR
2nd place, silver medalist(s)	Tina Klein	Germany	12.97	
3rd place, bronze medalist(s)	Anna Yevdokimova	Russia	13.12	
4	Marie Elisabeth Maurer	Austria	13.24	
5	Judith Ritz	Germany	13.32	
6	Carolin Nytra	Germany	13.34	
7	Aurore Ruet	France	13.41	
8	Rosina Hodde	Netherlands	13.54	

=== Heats ===
15 July
Qualified: first 2 in each heat and 2 best to the Final

==== Heat 1 ====
Wind: 0.6 m/s

Rank	Name	Nationality	Time	Notes
1	Anna Yevdokimova	Russia	13.31	Q
2	Judith Ritz	Germany	13.42	Q
3	Rahmatou Dramé	France	13.60	
4	Sabrina Altermatt	Switzerland	13.60	
5	Justyna Oleksy	Poland	13.62	
6	Silvia Franzon	Italy	13.88	
7	Andrea Ivančević	Croatia	13.88	

==== Heat 2 ====
Wind: -0.3 m/s

Rank	Name	Nationality	Time	Notes
1	Tina Klein	Germany	13.25	Q
2	Marie Elisabeth Maurer	Austria	13.38	Q
3	Rosina Hodde	Netherlands	13.43	q
4	Aurore Ruet	France	13.48	q
5	Yevheniya Snihur	Ukraine	13.57	
6	Jelena Jotanović	Serbia and Montenegro	13.89	
7	Agnieszka Czyż	Poland	14.39	

==== Heat 3 ====
Wind: -1.8 m/s

Rank	Name	Nationality	Time	Notes
1	Mirjam Liimask	Estonia	13.24	Q
2	Carolin Nytra	Germany	13.46	Q
3	Joanna Kocielnik	Poland	13.52	
4	Gemma Bennett	United Kingdom	13.59	
5	Dora Jémaa	France	13.65	
6	Daniela Lincoln Saavedra	Sweden	13.82	
7	Femke van der Meij	Netherlands	14.00	

== Participation ==
According to an unofficial count, 21 athletes from 14 countries participated in the event.

- Austria (1)
- Croatia (1)
- Estonia (1)
- France (3)
- Germany (3)
- Italy (1)
- Netherlands (2)
- Poland (3)
- Russia (1)
- Serbia and Montenegro (1)
- Sweden (1)
- Switzerland (1)
- Ukraine (1)
- United Kingdom (1)
