= Athletics at the 2007 Summer Universiade – Women's 100 metres hurdles =

The women's 100 metres hurdles event at the 2007 Summer Universiade was held on 9–10 August.

== Medalists ==
Gold	Silver	Bronze
Yauhenia Valadzko; Belarus	Nevin Yanıt; Turkey	Yevgeniya Snihur; Ukraine

== Results ==
=== Heats ===
Qualification: First 3 of each heat (Q) and the next 4 fastest (q) qualified for the semifinals.

Rank	Heat	Name	Nationality	Time	Notes
1	1	Anastasiya Vinogradova	Kazakhstan	13.12	Q
2	2	Nevin Yanıt	Turkey	13.17	Q
3	3	Natalya Ivoninskaya	Kazakhstan	13.22	Q
4	3	Yevgeniya Snihur	Ukraine	13.24	Q
5	4	Eline Berings	Belgium	13.27	Q
6	4	Yauhenia Valadzko	Belarus	13.28	Q
7	1	Carolin Nytra	Germany	13.30	Q
8	4	Yenima Arencibia	Cuba	13.32	Q
9	1	Aleksandra Fedoriva	Russia	13.33	Q
9	3	Andrea Miller	New Zealand	13.33	Q
11	2	Hanna Korell	Finland	13.40	Q
12	4	Ekaterina Shtepa	Russia	13.42	q
13	1	Laetitia Denis	France	13.50	q
14	2	Stephanie Lichtl	Germany	13.59	Q
15	1	Solymar Febles	Puerto Rico	13.71	q
16	2	Marie-Eve Dugas	Canada	13.76	q
17	2	Zhang Rong	China	13.76	
18	3	Mirjam Liimask	Estonia	13.77	
19	2	Jelena Jotanović	Serbia	13.81	FS1
20	4	Andrea Ivančević	Croatia	13.84	
21	1	Sonata Tamošaitytė	Lithuania	13.89	
22	3	Dedeh Erawati	Indonesia	13.91	
23	1	Esen Kizildag	Turkey	14.04	
24	4	Christine Ras	South Africa	14.24	
25	4	Marina Tomic	Slovenia	14.38	
26	2	Wallapa Pansoongnuen	Thailand	14.48	
27	2	Kadidiatou Loure	Burkina Faso	15.45	
	1	Patricia Riesco	Peru	DNF	
	4	Petra Seidlová	Czech Republic	DNF	
	3	Nguyen Thi Tham	Vietnam	DNS	

=== Semifinals ===
Qualification: First 4 of each semifinal qualified directly (Q) for the final.

Rank	Heat	Name	Nationality	Time	Notes
1	1	Yevgeniya Snihur	Ukraine	13.02	Q
2	2	Nevin Yanıt	Turkey	13.09	Q
3	1	Anastasiya Vinogradova	Kazakhstan	13.12	Q
4	2	Natalya Ivoninskaya	Kazakhstan	13.22	Q
5	2	Yauhenia Valadzko	Belarus	13.27	Q
6	1	Eline Berings	Belgium	13.30	Q
6	2	Andrea Miller	New Zealand	13.30	Q
8	1	Yenima Arencibia	Cuba	13.31	Q
9	2	Aleksandra Fedoriva	Russia	13.34	
10	2	Carolin Nytra	Germany	13.39	
11	1	Ekaterina Shtepa	Russia	13.47	
12	2	Laetitia Denis	France	13.51	
13	1	Hanna Korell	Finland	13.61	
14	2	Solymar Febles	Puerto Rico	13.66	
15	1	Stephanie Lichtl	Germany	13.84	
16	1	Marie-Eve Dugas	Canada	14.13	

=== Final ===
Wind: -0.3 m/s

Rank	Lane	Name	Nationality	Time	Notes
1st place, gold medalist(s)	7	Yauhenia Valadzko	Belarus	13.03	
2nd place, silver medalist(s)	4	Nevin Yanıt	Turkey	13.07	
3rd place, bronze medalist(s)	5	Yevgeniya Snihur	Ukraine	13.08	
4	6	Anastasiya Vinogradova	Kazakhstan	13.12	
5	3	Natalya Ivoninskaya	Kazakhstan	13.13	
6	2	Eline Berings	Belgium	13.17	
7	8	Andrea Miller	New Zealand	13.20	
8	1	Yenima Arencibia	Cuba	13.33	
