= Arantza Loureiro =

Spanish hurdler and long jumper

Arantza Loureiro (born 22 February 1981) is a Spanish athlete from País Vasco who specialized in the long jump and the 100 metres hurdles.

== Hurdles ==
In the 100 metres hurdles, she finished fifth at the 2008 Ibero-American Championships and fourth at the 2008 Ibero-American Championships. She also competed at the 2000 World Junior Championships, the 2001 European U23 Championships, the 2002 European Championships, the 2003 European U23 Championships, the 2006 European Championships, the 2007 European Indoor Championships without reaching the final.

Her personal best time was 13.35 seconds, achieved in July 2002 in Madrid.

She also finished seventh in the 4 x 100 metres relay at the 1999 European Junior Championships.

== Long jump ==
She finished eleventh at the 2001 European U23 Championships and won the gold medal at the 2008 Ibero-American Championships. She also competed at the 2007 European Indoor Championships and the 2009 European Indoor Championships without reaching the final.

Her personal best jump was 6.53 metres, achieved indoors in February 2009 in Seville. With this result, she became Spanish indoor champion, her only national title.

During the 2009 European Indoor Championships, she experienced a wrong landing in her second jump, and injured her right knee. A checkup in Madrid revealed a tore meniscus and cruciate ligament. She went through surgery and five months on crutches. Determined to reach her former level, she missed the entire 2010 season due to reconvalescence. She returned in 2011, but was not able to pass 6 metres in competition, and retired.

She resided in Etxebarri.
