= Anay Tejeda =

Cuban hurdler

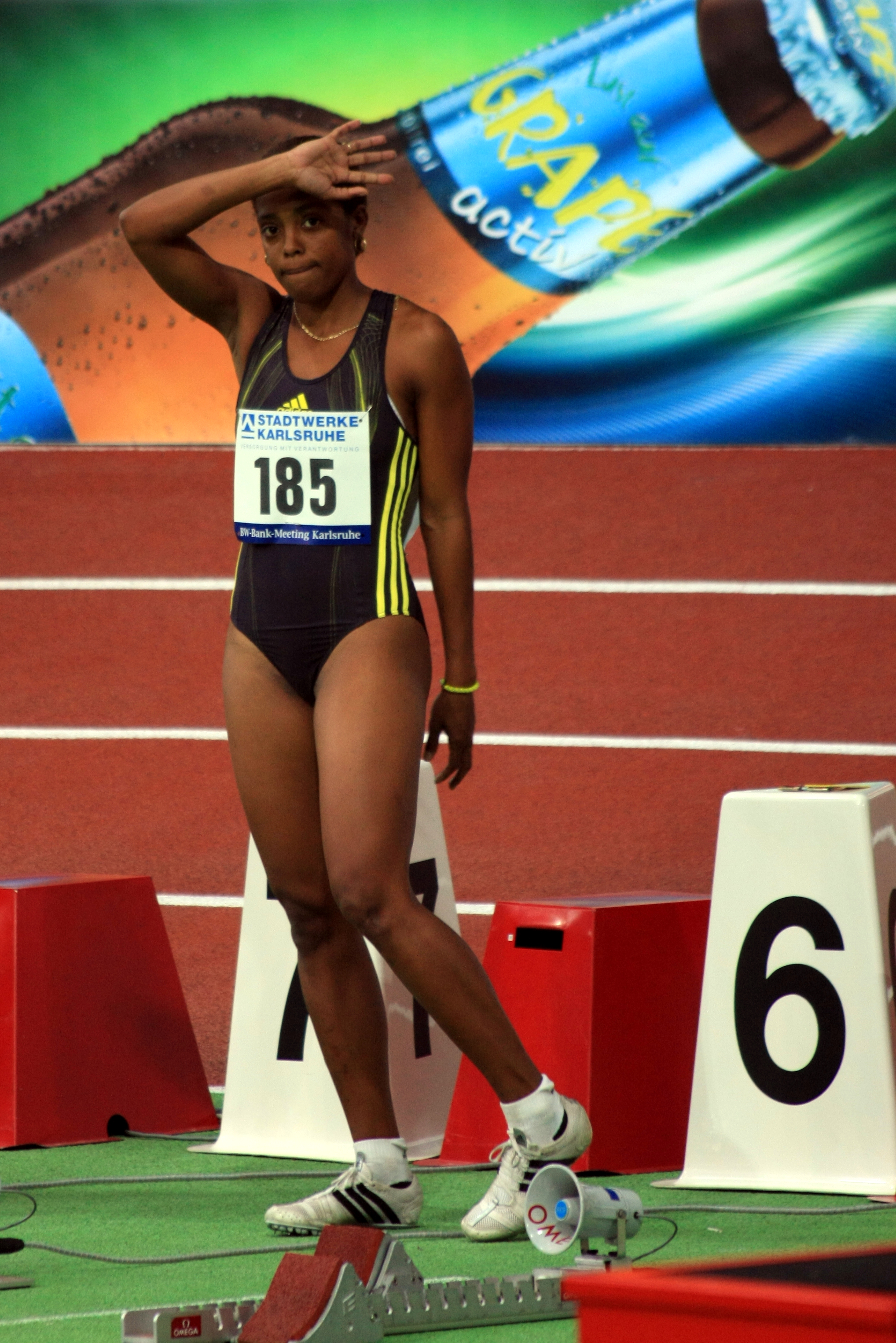
- Anay Tejeda in 2009

Personal information
- Full name: Anay Tejeda Quesada
- Born: April 3, 1983 (age 43) Marianao, Havana
- Height: 1.65 m (5 ft 5 in)
- Weight: 58 kg (128 lb)

Sport
- Country: Cuba
- Sport: Athletics
Medal record
Athletics
Representing Cuba
World Indoor Championships
Bronze medal – third place	2008 Valencia	60m hurdles
Pan American Games
Bronze medal – third place	2007 Rio de Janeiro	4x100m relay
Central American and Caribbean Games
Gold medal – first place	2006 Cartagena	100m hurdles
Gold medal – first place	2006 Cartagena	4x100m relay
World Junior Championships
Gold medal – first place	2002 Kingston	100m hurdles
CAC Junior Championships (U20)
Gold medal – first place	2002 Bridgetown	100 m hurdles
- Updated on 25 June 2013

Anay Tejeda Quesada (born 3 April 1983 in Marianao, Havana) is a Cuban hurdler. Her personal best time is 12.61 seconds, achieved in July 2008 in Cali.

== Personal bests ==
Event	Best	Venue	Date
Outdoor
100 metres	11.81 s (wind: -1.5 m/s)	(Spain) Cáceres	28 June 2006
200 metres	24.76 s (wind: +1.8 m/s)	(Morocco) Tangier	12 July 2009
100 metres hurdles	12.61 s A NR (wind: +1.4 m/s)	(Colombia) Cali	5 July 2008
Indoor
60 metres	7.43 s	(France) Aubière	26 February 2008
50 metres hurdles	6.83 s	(France) Liévin	5 March 2010
60 metres hurdles	7.43 s	(Germany) Karlsruhe	10 February 2008

== Achievements ==
Year	Competition	Venue	Position	Event	Notes
Representing Cuba
1999	World Youth Championships	Bydgoszcz, Poland	3rd	100 m hurdles	13.45 s (wind: -0.4 m/s)
2000	World Junior Championships	Santiago, Chile	7th	100 m hurdles	13.38 s PB (wind: -1.7 m/s)
2002	Central American and Caribbean Junior Championships (U-20)	Bridgetown, Barbados	1st	100 m hurdles	12.93 s CR (wind: +0.0 m/s)
2002	World Junior Championships	Kingston, Jamaica	1st	100 m hurdles	12.81 s w (wind: +3.4 m/s)
2003	Pan American Games	Santo Domingo, Dominican Republic	8th	100 m hurdles	13.20 s (wind: -0.3 m/s)
2004	World Indoor Championships	Budapest, Hungary	14th (h)	60 m hurdles	8.18 s
2004	Olympic Games	Athens, Greece	25th (h)	100 m hurdles	13.24 s (wind: +. m/s)
2005	World Championships	Helsinki, Finland	11th (sf)	100 m hurdles	12.95 s (wind: -0.5 m/s)
2005	Universiade	İzmir, Turkey	5th	100 m hurdles	13.33 s (wind: +0.5 m/s)
2006	World Indoor Championships	Moscow, Russia	15th (sf)	60 m hurdles	8.25 s
2006	Central American and Caribbean Games	Cartagena, Colombia	1st	100 m hurdles	12.86 s (wind: +0.4 m/s)
2006	Central American and Caribbean Games	Cartagena, Colombia	1st	4 × 100 m relay	43.29 s
2007	Pan American Games	Rio de Janeiro, Brazil	5th	100 m hurdles	12.95 s (wind: +0.0 m/s)
2007	Pan American Games	Rio de Janeiro, Brazil	3rd	4 × 100 m relay	43.62 s
2007	World Championships	Osaka, Japan	14th (sf)	100 m hurdles	12.89s (wind: -0.1 m/s)
2008	World Indoor Championships	Valencia, Spain	3rd	60 m hurdles	7.98 s
2008	Central American and Caribbean Championships	Cali, Colombia	1st	100 m hurdles	12.61 s (wind: +1.4 m/s)
2008	Olympic Games	Beijing, China	10th (h)	100 m hurdles	12.84 s (wind: -0.6 m/s)
2009	ALBA Games	Havana, Cuba	1st	100 m hurdles	12.98 s w (wind: +3.3 m/s)
2009	Central American and Caribbean Championships	Havana, Cuba	1st	100 m hurdles	12.95 s (wind: +1.0 m/s)
2009	World Championships	Berlin, Germany	11th (sf)	100 m hurdles	12.82 s (wind: +0.1 m/s)
2010	World Indoor Championships	Doha, Qatar	4th	60 m hurdles	7.91 s
2010	Ibero-American Championships	San Fernando, Spain	1st	100 m hurdles	12.84 s (wind: +0.5 m/s)
