= Mariya Koroteyeva =

Russian hurdler

Mariya Mikhailovna Koroteyeva (Russian: Мария Михайловна Коротеева; born 10 November 1981) is a Russian athlete who specializes in the 100 metres hurdles.

Her personal best time is 12.60 seconds, achieved during the Olympic Games in Athens.

== International competitions ==
Representing Russia
Year	Competition	Venue	Position	Event	Time	Notes
2000	World Junior Championships	Santiago, Chile	8th (sf)	100 m hurdles	13.47	wind: -0.4 m/s
2003	European U23 Championships	Bydgoszcz, Poland	3rd	100 m hurdles	12.95	wind: 1.0 m/s
2004	Olympic Games	Athens, Greece	4th	100 m hurdles	12.72	
2004	World Athletics Final	Monte Carlo, Monaco	8th	100 m hurdles	12.79	
2005	World Championships	Helsinki, Finland	5th	100 m hurdles	12.93	
