= Mirjam Liimask =

Estonian hurdler

Personal information
- Born: 25 October 1983 (age 42) Tartu, then part of Estonian SSR, Soviet Union
- Height: 1.70 m (5 ft 7 in)
- Weight: 58 kg (128 lb)

Mirjam Liimask (born 25 October 1983) is an Estonian retired hurdler. She became the European U23 champion in 2005.

== Competition record ==
Year	Competition	Venue	Position	Event	Notes
Representing Estonia
2002	European Indoor Championships	Vienna, Austria	21st (h)	60 m	7.53
2002	European Indoor Championships	Vienna, Austria	16th (h)	60 m hurdles	8.33
2002	World Junior Championships	Kingston, Jamaica	7th	100 m hurdles	13.80 w (wind: +3.4 m/s)
2002	European Championships	Munich, Germany	33rd (h)	100 m hurdles	13.75
2003	European U23 Championships	Bydgoszcz, Poland	11th (sf)	100m hurdles	13.41 (wind: +1.0 m/s)
2003	Universiade	Daegu, South Korea	6th	100m hurdles	13.59
2005	European Indoor Championships	Madrid, Spain	18th (h)	60 m hurdles	8.25
2005	European U23 Championships	Erfurt, Germany	1st	100m hurdles	12.93 (wind: +0.9 m/s) NR
2005	Universiade	İzmir, Turkey	1st	100 m hurdles	12.96
2006	European Championships	Gothenburg, Sweden	28th (h)	100 m hurdles	13.54
2007	Universiade	Bangkok, Thailand	31st (qf)	100 m	12.31
2007	Universiade	Bangkok, Thailand	18th (h)	100 m hurdles	13.77
