= Marina Tomić =

Slovenian hurdler (born 1983)

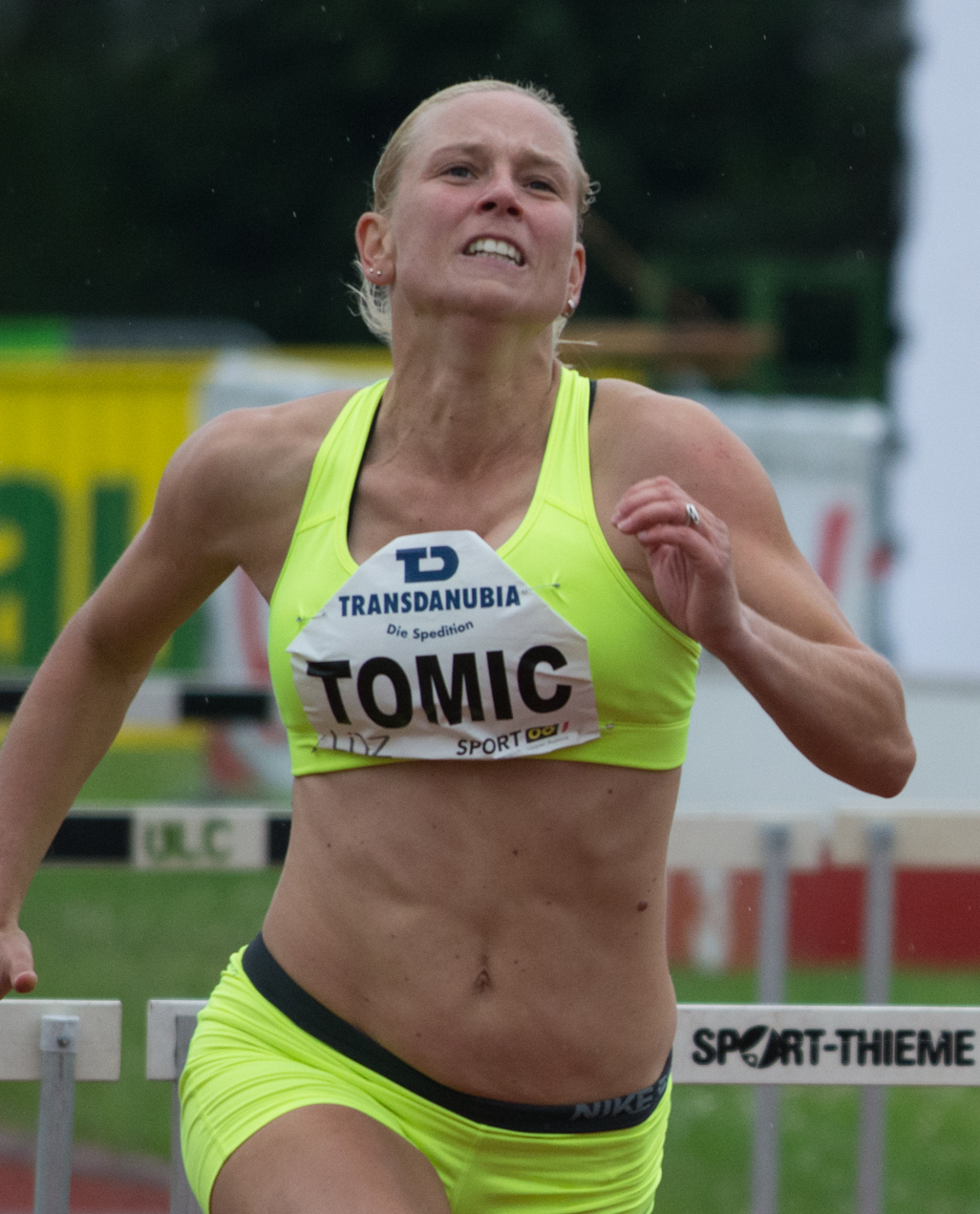
- Tomić in 2016

Personal information
- Full name: Marina Tomić
- Born: 30 April 1983 (age 43) Celje, SFR Yugoslavia
- Height: 1.68 m (5 ft 6 in)

Sport
- Country: Slovenia
- Sport: Athletics
- Events: 60 m hurdles, 100 m hurdles

Achievements and titles
- Personal bests: 60 m hurdles: 8.13 (Val-de-Reuil, February 2012); 100 m hurdles: 13.04 (Slovenska Bistrica, May 2012)
Medal record
Women's athletics
Representing Slovenia
Mediterranean Games
Bronze medal – third place	2013 Mersin	100 m hurdles

Marina Tomić (born 30 April 1983 in Celje) is a Slovenian athlete who specialises in the 100 metres hurdles.

Tomić represented Slovenia at the 2012 Summer Olympics where she finished in joint 21st place in the 100 m hurdles.

== Achievements ==
Year	Competition	Venue	Position	Event	Notes
Representing Slovenia
2000	World Junior Championships	Santiago, Chile	36th (h)	100 m hurdles	14.25 (+0.7 m/s)
2001	European Junior Championships	Grosseto, Italy	18th (h)	100 m hurdles	17.08 (w)
2002	World Junior Championships	Kingston, Jamaica	9th (h)	100 m hurdles	13.74 (+0.3 m/s) PB
2003	World Indoor Championships	Birmingham, United Kingdom	22nd (h)	60 m hurdles	8.31
2003	European U23 Championships	Bydgoszcz, Poland	8th	100 m hurdles	13.37 (+1.0 m/s)
2003	Universiade	Daegu, South Korea	8th	100 m hurdles	DQ
2005	European Indoor Championships	Madrid, Spain	=18th (h)	60 m hurdles	8.25
2006	European Championships	Gothenburg, Sweden	35th (h)	100 m hurdles	13.79
2007	Universiade	Bangkok, Thailand	25th (h)	100 m hurdles	14.38
2009	Universiade	Belgrade, Serbia	8th (sf)	100 m hurdles	13.43, SB
2009	Universiade	Belgrade, Serbia	9th (h)	4 × 100 m relay	45.61
2010	European Championships	Barcelona, Spain	18th (h)	100 m hurdles	13.28
2011	European Indoor Championships	Paris, France	14th (sf)	60 m hurdles	8.21
2011	World Championships	Daegu, South Korea	27th (h)	100 m hurdles	13.36
2012	World Indoor Championships	Istanbul, Turkey	24th (h)	60 m hurdles	8.67
2012	European Championships	Helsinki, Finland	20th (h)	100 m hurdles	13.36
2012	Olympic Games	London, United Kingdom	=21st (h)	100 m hurdles	13.10
2013	European Indoor Championships	Gothenburg, Sweden	23rd (h)	60 m hurdles	8.34
2013	Mediterranean Games	Mersin, Turkey	3rd	100 m hurdles	13.11
2013	World Championships	Moscow, Russia	25th (h)	100 m hurdles	13.26
2014	World Indoor Championships	Sopot, Poland	11th (sf)	60 m hurdles	8.05
2014	European Championships	Zürich, Switzerland	17th (sf)	100 m hurdles	13.32
2015	European Indoor Championships	Prague, Czech Republic	13th (sf)	60 m hurdles	8.08
2016	World Indoor Championships	Portland, United States	15th (h)	60 m hurdles	8.33
2016	European Championships	Amsterdam, Netherlands	20th (sf)	100 m hurdles	13.32
