= Nevin Yanıt =

Turkish hurdler (born 1986)

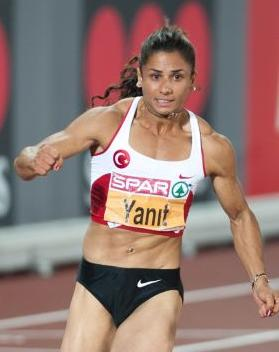
- Yanıt at the 2012 European Athletics Championships

Personal information
- Nationality: Turkish
- Born: 16 February 1986 (age 40) Mersin, Turkey
- Height: 1.65 m (5.4 ft)
- Weight: 60 kg (130 lb)

Sport
- Sport: Running
- Events: 60 metres hurdles 100 metres hurdles
- Club: Fenerbahçe Athletics

Achievements and titles
- Personal bests: 60 m hs: 8.00 (2007); 100 m hs: 12.63 (2010)
Medal record
Representing Turkey
Women's athletics
Event	1st	2nd	3rd
European Championships	1	0	0
Summer Universiade	1	1	0
Mediterranean Games	1	0	0
European U23 Championships	1	0	0
European Championships
Disqualified	2012 Helsinki	100 m hurdles
Gold medal – first place	2010 Barcelona	100 m hurdles
European Indoor Championships
Disqualified	2013 Gothenburg	60 m hurdles
European U23 Championships
Gold medal – first place	2007 Debrecen	100 m hurdles
Mediterranean Games
Gold medal – first place	2009 Pescara	100 m hurdles
Universiade
Gold medal – first place	2009 Belgrade	100 m hurdles
Silver medal – second place	2007 Bangkok	100 m hurdles

Nevin Yanıt (born 16 February 1986) is a Turkish former sprinter specializing in high hurdling.

On 29 August 2013, Yanit was banned from athletic competition for two years following a failed doping test in February 2013. After IAAF appealed the length of the ban to the Court of Arbitration for Sport, her ban was extended for a further year.

== Biography ==
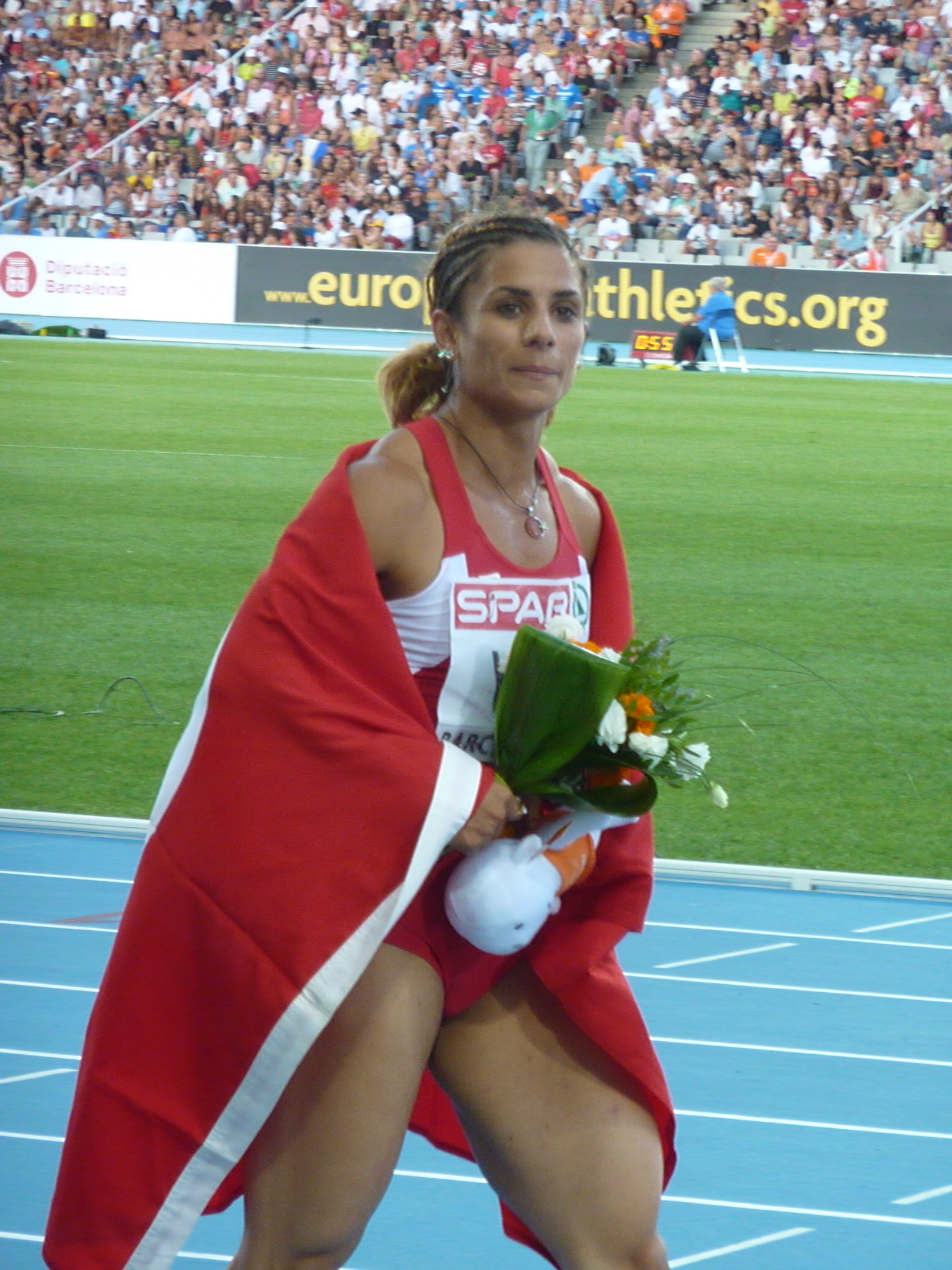
Yanit in 2010 with Turkey flag, at her 1st European title.

Yanıt won the 100 m hurdles at the 2007 European Under 23 Athletics Championships. She won the silver medal at the 2007 Summer Universiade in Bangkok, Thailand.

At the 2008 Summer Olympics in Beijing, China, she reached the semi-finals in the 100 m hurdles. Yanıt participated at the 2009 Mediterranean Games in Pescara, Italy and won the gold medal in women's 100 m hurdles. She won the 100 m hurdles at the European Cup First League Group B on 18 June 2006, in Thessaloniki, Greece. At the 2010 European Athletics Championships in Barcelona, she won the gold medal in the 100 m hurdles, edging favourites, Derval O'Rourke and Carolin Nytra.

At the 2012 Summer Olympics in London, she progressed to the final in the 100 m hurdles, taking fifth place-a result she of which she was later stripped. At the 2013 European Athletics Indoor Championships in Gothenburg, Sweden, she won the gold medal-a medal of which she was later stripped.

== Doping ban ==
In 2013 the Turkish Athletics Federation announced that Yanit had failed a doping test, after traces of testosterone and the anabolic steroid Stanozolol were found in a testing sample. On 29 August 2013, a two-year ban was handed down by the Turkish Federation, precluding Yanit from competition until 5 August 2015. Following IAAF's appeal to the Court of Arbitration for sport, her ban was extended to 3 years for aggravating circumstances. In addition to the positive for two prohibited substances her biological passport data showed that she had been blood doping between June 2012 and February 2013.

The IAAF later confirmed that her results since 28 June 2012 had all been voided and she was stripped of her European Championship title and 5th-place finish at the 2012 Summer Olympics.

== Personal life ==
Yanıt competed between 2007 and 2008 for Vestel Athletics. In 2008, she joined Fenerbahçe Athletics. She majored in Physical Education at Mersin University,

In 2011, an athletics venue in Mersin with 4,500 seating capacity, built in 2010, was named in her honor.

== Achievements ==
Year	Competition	Venue	Position	Event	Notes
Representing Turkey
2004	World Junior Championships	Grosseto, Italy	19th (h)	100 m hurdles	13.98 (wind: +1.0 m/s)
2004	World Junior Championships	Grosseto, Italy	—	4 × 400 m relay	DQ
2005	European Junior Championships	Kaunas, Lithuania	9th (sf)	100 m hurdles	13.91
2005	Universiade	İzmir, Turkey	16th (sf)	100 m hurdles	13.89
2006	European Championships	Gothenburg, Sweden	14th (h)	4 × 100 m relay	46.32
2007	European Indoor Championships	Birmingham, United Kingdom	9th (h)	60 m hurdles	8.11
2007	European U23 Championships	Debrecen, Hungary	1st	100 m hurdles	12.90 (wind: -0.3 m/s)
2007	Universiade	Bangkok, Thailand	2nd	100 m hurdles	13.07
2007	World Championships	Osaka, Japan	12th (sf)	100 m hurdles	12.85
2008	World Indoor Championships	Valencia, Spain	14th (sf)	60 m hurdles	8.19
2008	Olympic Games	Beijing, China	14th (sf)	100 m hurdles	13.28
2009	Mediterranean Games	Pescara, Italy	1st	100 m hurdles	13.08
2009	Universiade	Belgrade, Serbia	1st	100 m hurdles	12.89
2009	World Championships	Berlin, Germany	15th (sf)	100 m hurdles	12.99
2010	European Championships	Barcelona, Spain	1st	100 m hurdles	12.63
2011	Universiade	Shenzhen, China	6th	100 m hurdles	13.27
2011	World Championships	Daegu, South Korea	22nd (sf)	100 m hurdles	13.31
2012	European Championships	Helsinki, Finland	DSQ	100 m hurdles	~~12.81~~
2012	Olympic Games	London, United Kingdom	DSQ	100 m hurdles	~~12.58~~ ~~NR~~
2013	European Indoor Championships	Gothenburg, Sweden	DSQ	60 m hurdles	~~7.89~~ ~~EL NR~~

== See also ==
- Turkish women in sports
- Nevin Yanıt Athletics Complex
