= Andrea Ivančević =

Croatian hurdler (born 1984)

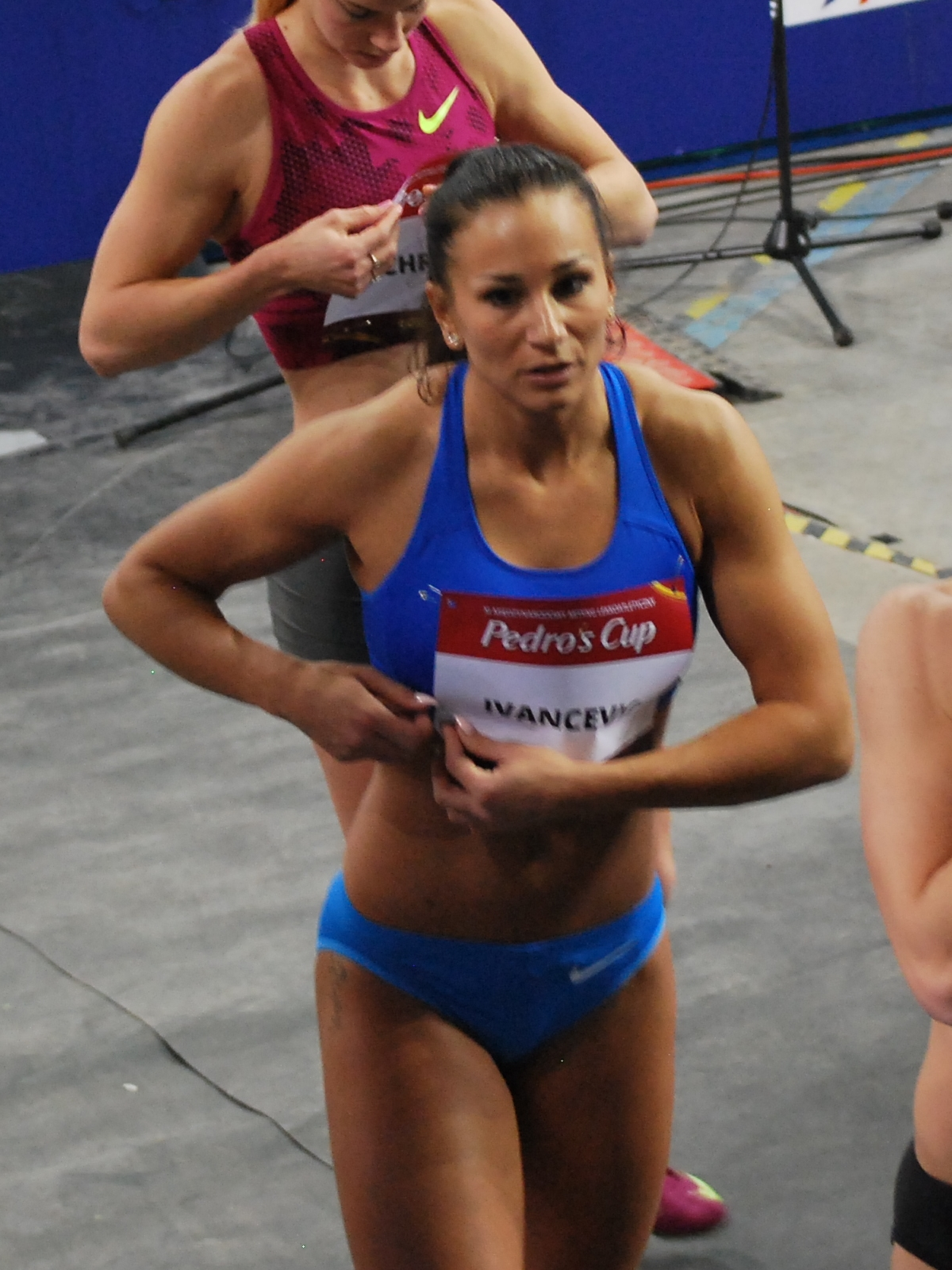
- Ivančević in Łódź, 2015

Personal information
- Nationality: Croatian
- Born: 21 August 1984 (age 41)

Sport
- Country: (Croatia)
- Sport: Athletics
- Event: 100 metres hurdles
- Club: Atletski klub Zagreb
- Coached by: Igor Čordaš
Medal record
Mediterranean Games
Gold medal – first place	2018 Tarragona	100 m hs

Andrea Ivančević (born 21 August 1984) is a Croatian track and field athlete who specialises in the 100 metres hurdles. She has a best of 12.85 seconds for the event which is as well Croatian national record. She holds Croatian records in the indoor 60 metres and 60 metres hurdles. Ivančević has represented Croatia at the European Athletics Championships, European Athletics Indoor Championships and the IAAF World Indoor Championships

== Career ==
Born in Zagreb, Ivančević took up gymnastics at an early age but switched to athletics at the age of 15 after ten years of little success in her previous sport. Focusing on hurdling instead, she competed internationally as a youth and ran in the heats of both the 2001 World Youth and the 2002 World Junior Championships in Athletics. She ran a Croatian junior record at the latter event. She gradually improved her personal bests in her first seasons as a senior athlete, having a best of 13.86 seconds for the 100 m hurdles in 2003, 13.64 in 2004, then 13.60 in 2005. She competed in the heats only of the 2005 European Athletics U23 Championships and made her senior debut at the 2006 European Athletics Championships, again only competing in the heats. A personal best of 13.42 seconds came in 2006, but a further appearance at the 2007 Summer Universiade saw her again fail to pass the heats.

At the start of 2008 she ran a Croatian record of 7.32 seconds for the 60 metres flat indoors. She missed the 2009 and 2010 seasons, but helped set another national record in 2011: 45.14 for the 4×100 metres relay while at the 2011 European Team Championships. She also represented her country at the 2011 European Athletics Indoor Championships, but did not qualify for the final. She was again inactive in 2012 and 2013. Her sole major outing of 2014 IAAF World Indoor Championships brought her success in the form of two national record runs – first she ran 8.10, then 8.09 in the semi-finals.

Ivančević broke new ground at the 2015 European Athletics Indoor Championships. Having national record times of 8.02 seconds in the heats and 7.97 seconds in the semi-finals, she made her first continental final and ended up seventh overall.

== Personal bests ==
- 100 metres hurdles – 12.85 (2018) NR
- 60 metres – 7.29 (2015) NR
- 60 metres hurdles – 7.91 (2016) NR
- 100meters - 11.30 (2015) NR

== International competitions ==
Year	Competition	Venue	Position	Event	Notes
Representing Croatia
2001	World Youth Championships	Debrecen, Hungary	20th (h)	100 m hurdles (76.2 cm)	14.60
2002	World Junior Championships	Kingston, Jamaica	12th (h)	100 m hurdles	13.86 (+0.3 m/s)
2005	European U23 Championships	Erfurt, Germany	18th (h)	100 m hurdles	13.88 (+0.6 m/s)
2006	European Championships	Gothenburg, Sweden	32nd (h)	100 m hurdles	13.60
2007	Universiade	Bangkok, Thailand	20th (h)	100 m hurdles	13.84
2011	European Indoor Championships	Paris, France	22nd	60 m hurdles	8.43
2014	World Indoor Championships	Sopot, Poland	13th (sf)	60 m hurdles	8.09 NR
2015	European Indoor Championships	Prague, Czech Republic	7th	60 m hurdles	8.02
2015	World Championships	Beijing, China	20th (sf)	100 m hurdles	33.95
2016	World Indoor Championships	Portland, United States	4th	60 m hurdles	7.95
2016	Olympic Games	Rio de Janeiro, Brazil	13th (sf)	100 m hurdles	12.93
2018	World Indoor Championships	Birmingham, United Kingdom	12th (sf)	60 m hurdles	8.07
2018	Mediterranean Games	Tarragona, Spain	1st	100 m hurdles	13.19
2018	European Championships	Berlin, Germany	17th (sf)	100 m hurdles	13.13
2019	European Indoor Championships	Glasgow, United Kingdom	7th	60 m hurdles	8.14
