= Nadine Hentschke =

German hurdler

Nadine Hentschke (born 27 January 1982, in Rheinberg) is a German athlete who specialises in the 100 metres hurdles.

Hentschke finished seventh at the 2002 and 2005 European Indoor Championships. She also competed at the 2003 World Championships and the 2004 Olympic Games without reaching the finals.

Her personal best is 12.89 seconds, achieved in July 2003 in Bydgoszcz.
