= Julie Pratt =

English athlete (born 1979)

Personal information
- Nationality: British (English)
- Born: 20 March 1979 (age 46)

Sport
- Sport: Athletics
- Event: hurdles
- Club: Woodford Green with Essex Ladies

Julie Pratt (born 20 March 1979) is an English female athlete who competed in the 100 metres hurdles. She has a personal best time of 13.08 seconds.

== Biography ==
Pratt was the first ever British athlete to win a gold medal in the 100 metres hurdles at the World Junior Championships, winning in Annecy, France in 1998. This was Britain's first ever gold medal at World or Olympic level in the women's 100 metres hurdles.

She also won a silver medal at the 1999 European Under 23 Championships in Gothenburg, Sweden.

Pratt finished third behind Diane Allahgreen in the 100 metres hurdles event at the 2000 AAA Championships and two years later finished second behind Allahgreen again at the 2002 AAA Championships.

Pratt represented England at the 2002 Commonwealth Games in Manchester finishing in sixth place.

After a third place finish at the 2003 AAAs behind Rachel King, she represented England at the 2006 Commonwealth Games in Melbourne.

== Coaching ==
Julie now coaches under her married name of Julie Pratt-Benterman, and is mainly based at Chelmsford Sport and Athletics Centre. She works with England Athletics as their Talent Event Lead for Sprint hurdles, focusing on U20 athletes, and is a Regional Coach Lead for the South East.
