= Christina Vukicevic =

Norwegian hurdler

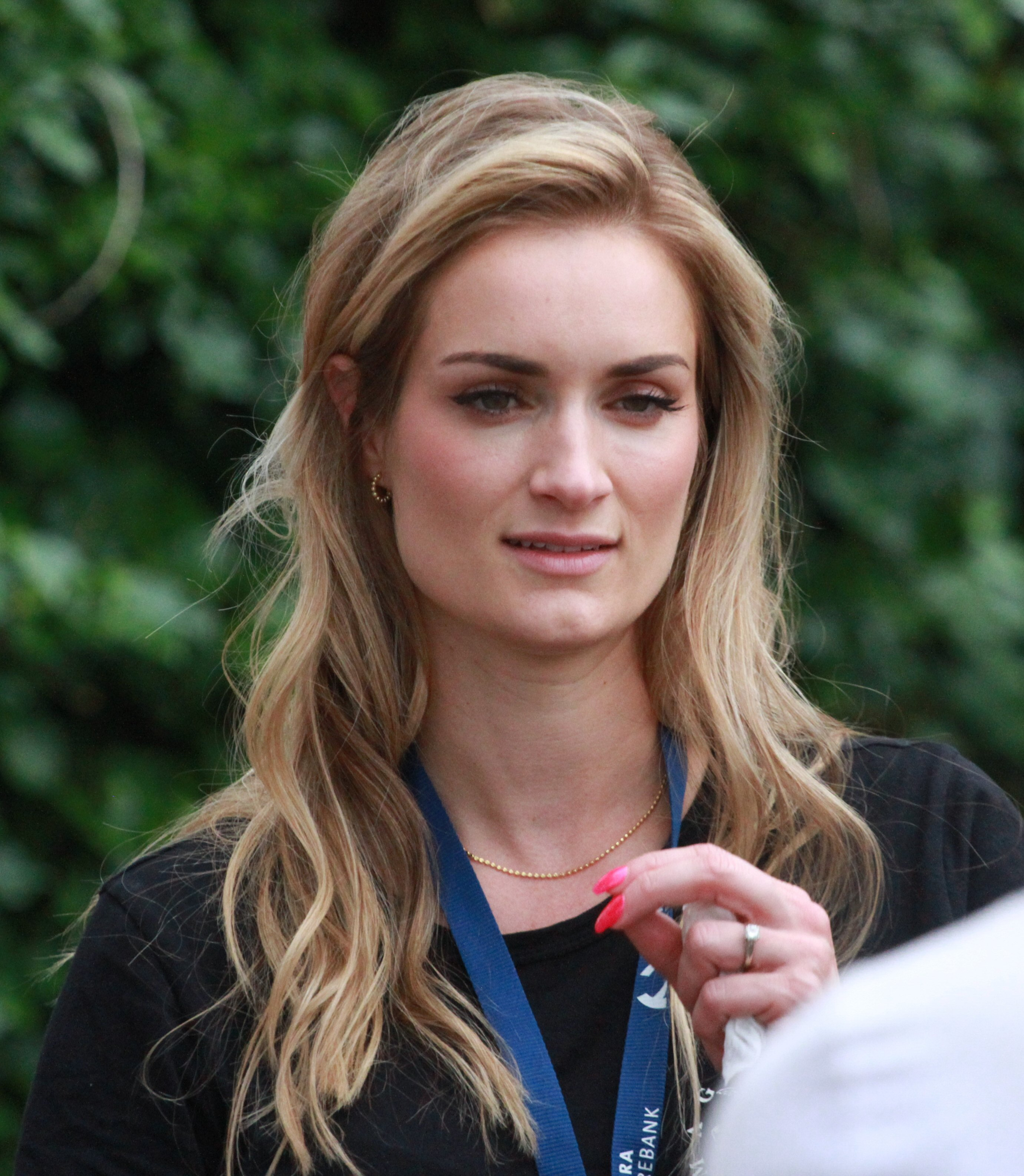
- Vukicevic at the Norwegian Athletics Championships in 2022

Personal information
- Born: Ljubica Christina Vukicevic; 18 June 1987 (age 39) Lørenskog, Norway
- Height: 1.77 m (5 ft 10 in)

Sport
- Country: Norway
- Sport: Athletics
- Events: 60 m hurdles 100 m hurdles
- Club: Ski IL
- Coached by: Petar Vukičević

Achievements and titles
- Personal bests: 100 m hurdles: 12.74 (2009); 60 m hurdles: 7.83 (2011) NR
Medal record
Women's athletics
Representing Norway
European Indoor Championships
| Bronze medal – third place | 2011 Paris | 60 m hurdles |
European U23 Championships
| Gold medal – first place | 2009 Kaunas | 100 m hurdles |
| Silver medal – second place | 2007 Debrecen | 100 m hurdles |
World Junior Championships
| Silver medal – second place | 2006 Beijing | 100 m hurdles |
European Junior Championships
| Silver medal – second place | 2005 Kaunas | 100 m hurdles |
European Youth Olympic Festival
| Gold medal – first place | 2003 Paris | 100 m hurdles |

Ljubica Christina Vukicevic Demidov (Serbian: Ljubica Kristina Vukićević, Љубица Кристина Вукићевић, pronounced [ʎûbitsa kristǐːna ʋukǐːtɕeʋitɕ]; born 18 June 1987) is a Norwegian former hurdler. She is a European Indoor Championships bronze medallist, European U23 gold and silver medallist, World Junior and European Junior silver medallist, and European Youth Olympics gold medallist.

Vukicevic competed at the 2008 Summer Olympics, and represented Ski IL and IL Tyrving during her career. She is also a seven-time Norwegian national champion in the 100 metres hurdles and holds the national record in the 60 m hurdles with a personal best of 7.83 seconds, set at the 2011 European Indoor Championships.

== Career ==
Vukicevic earned her first international medal when she won the gold medal in the 100 metres hurdles event at the 2003 European Youth Summer Olympic Festival in Paris. She finished fifth at the 2004 World Junior Championships, and won a silver medal at the 2005 European Junior Championships in Kaunas. Vukicevic was forced to take a prolonged break during the summer of 2005 due to a knee-injury and the following surgery. At the 2006 World Junior Championships, she took the silver medal with the time 13.34 seconds, a national junior record. She made her senior international debut at the 2007 World Championships and ran a personal best of 13.07 seconds in the heats. Since 2004, she has been the Norwegian champion, last in 2008 with a time of 13.20 seconds.

Vukicevic has later lowered her personal best time to 13.05 seconds, achieved during the 2008 Olympic Games in Beijing. On the 60 meter hurdles she has 8.03 seconds set on an international meeting in Düsseldorf 2008. She just missed out on the podium with a fourth-place finish at the 2009 European Indoor Championships. She won her first international gold medal at the 2009 European U23 Championships in Kaunas, with a time of 12.99 seconds. She lowered her best that year to 12.74, which she achieved in Hengelo. She competed at the 2009 World Championships in Athletics but she could not reach heights she had in Hengelo, and was knocked out in the semifinals after running 13.00 seconds.

Vukicevic started the 2010 season by setting a new best in the 60 metres hurdles with a run of 7.94 seconds – a Norwegian record. She narrowly missed a place in the final at the 2010 IAAF World Indoor Championships. At the 2010 European Team Championships she won the bronze medal and came fourth at the 2010 European Athletics Championships later on, recording her season's best of 12.78 seconds in the final. Her 2011 season opened just as it had the previous year, with a national record over 60 m hurdles (7.92 seconds). She improved her mark further to 7.90 seconds at the BW Bank Meeting in February. Vukicevic won a bronze medal in the 60 m event at the 2011 European Athletics Indoor Championships in March and set a new personal best and Norwegian national record in the finals with a time of 7.83 seconds. In November 2012, it was reported that she had been training with the controversial doctor Srdjan Djordjevic. On 29 February 2016, Vukicevic announced her retirement as an athlete, having not competed since 2012 due to an injury. She has worked as a commentator for the Norwegian public broadcaster NRK since 2021.

== Personal life ==
Vukicevic was born and raised in Drøbak by Serbian professional hurdler and sport of athletics coach Petar Vukičević and a half-Norwegian, half-Serbian mother. She grew up with her younger brother, Vladimir Vukicevic and has two younger half-siblings. She is married to Norwegian footballer Vadim Demidov. On 29 February 2016, she revealed that she is expecting a child with Demidov and announced her retirement from professional sport.

== Personal bests ==
| Event | Time (sec) | Venue | Date |
|---|---|---|---|
| 60 metres hurdles | 7.83 NR | Paris, Bercy, France | 4 March 2011 |
| 100 metres hurdles | 12.74 | Hengelo, Netherlands | 1 June 2009 |
| 60 metres | 7.76 | Oslo, Norway | 15 January 2005 |
| 100 metres | 12.26 | Nadderud, Norway | 13 June 2004 |
| 200 metres | 24.90 | Fagernes, Norway | 15 August 2004 |

- All information taken from IAAF profile.
