= Kadri Viigipuu =

Estonian athlete (born 1982)

Kadri Viigipuu (since 2014 Viigipuu-Joorits; born 4 February 1982) is an Estonian athletics competitor.

She was born in Tartu. In 2007 graduated University of Tartu's Institute of Physical Education.

She began athletics training under the guidance of Kersti Viru and Katrin Klaup. She has competed at European Athletics Indoor Championships. She is multiple-times Estonian champion in different running disciplines. 2001–2005 and 2009 she was a member of Estonian national athletics team.

Personal best:

- 100 m: 11,97 (2002)
- 200 m: 24,24 (2005)
- 100 m hurdles: 13,31 (2005)
- 60 m hurdles: 8,29 (2006)
