= Alice Decaux =

French hurdler

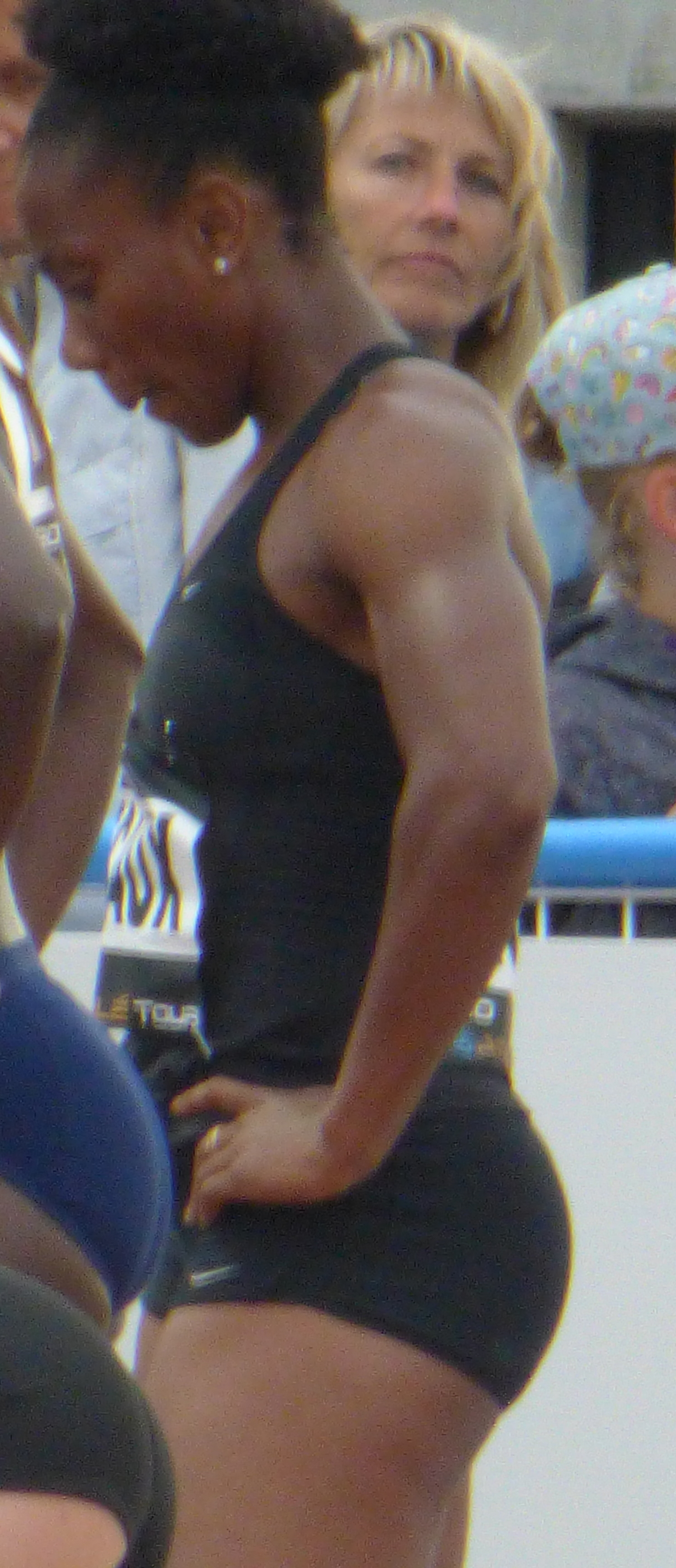

Personal information
- Nationality: French
- Born: 10 April 1985 (age 40) Abidjan
- Years active: 2003-présent
- Height: 1.64 m (5 ft 5 in)
- Weight: 60 kg (132 lb)

Sport
- Event(s): 60m hurdles, 100m hurdles
- Club: US Ivry

Alice Decaux (born 10 April 1985 in Abidjan) is a French athlete, who specializes in the 60 meter hurdles and 100 meters hurdles.

== Career ==
She was eliminated in the 60 meters hurdles semifinals at Doha world Championships, Saturday 13 March 2010, placing 8th and last with a time of 8.23s. A year later, she seemed to have turned a corner by running 7.97s in the final of the Indoors French championship, making her a serious contender for the podium 2011 Indoors European Championships at Paris, in France. But on 4 March 2011, at Palais Omnisports de Paris-Bercy, she failed in the semifinal of the 60 meter hurdles, where she failed on the fifth and final hurdle before which she was doing well.

In 2012, she stopped being coached by former French hurdles champion Patricia Girard.

In 2013, she further improved her personal best on 13 July on the occasion of French Championships running 12.70s. However a few days later she was declared positive for the use of amphetamines, as a result of a check performed during 23 June 2013 European Team Championships. She was suspended six months by the IAAF and therefore excluded from the French delegation for World Athletic Games at Moscow.

== Prize list ==
=== National ===
- Champion of France of 60 meter hurdles in 2010 (8.06s) and 2011 (7.97s)
- 3rd at Championships of France in 60 meters hurdles in 2009
- 3rd at Championships of France in 60 meters hurdles in 2007 Aubière (Clermont-Ferrand)
- 3rd at the French Championships of 100 meters hurdles in 2008 to Albi (13.28s)
- 1st at the French Championships of 100 meters hurdles in 2012 Angers (12.88s)
- 2nd at the French Championships of 100 meters hurdles in 2013 Paris (12.70s)

=== Personal Bests ===
- 60 meters hurdles (indoors) : 7.97 s at Aubière 19 February 2011 at the French Indoor Championships
- 100 meters hurdles (outdoor) : 12.70s at Paris on 13 July 2013 during the French Championships.
