= 2025 European Athletics U23 Championships – Women's 100 metres hurdles =

Women's 100 metres hurdles at the 2025 European Athletics U23 Championships
- Venue: Fana Stadion
- Location: Bergen, Norway
- Dates: 17 July (heats); 18 July (semi-finals & final)
- Competitors: 48 from 26 nations
- Winning time: 12.91

Medalists
gold medal	Alicja Sielska	Poland
silver medal	Anna Tóth	Hungary
bronze medal	Tereza Čorejová	Slovakia

The women's 100 metres hurdles event at the 2025 European Athletics U23 Championships was held in Bergen, Norway, at Fana Stadion on 17 and 18 July.

== Records ==
Prior to the competition, the records were as follows:

Record	Athlete (nation)	Time (s)	Location	Date
European U23 record	Ditaji Kambundji (SUI)	12.40	Rome, Italy	8 June 2024
Championship U23 record	Ditaji Kambundji (SUI)	12.68	Espoo, Finland	15 July 2023

== Results ==
=== Heats ===
First 3 in each heat (Q) and the next 6 fastest (q) qualified for the semi-finals.

==== Heat 1 ====
Place	Athlete	Nation	Time	Notes
1	Alicja Sielska	Poland	13.13	Q
2	Melissa Sereno	Portugal	13.24	Q
3	Auceane Bouijoux	France	13.50	Q
4	Ava Testa	Austria	13.69	
5	Katjuša Jordan Nadižar	Slovenia	14.05	
6	Elisa Fossattelli	Italy	14.11	
7	Linoy Levy	Israel	14.17	
8	Gabija Klimukaitė	Lithuania	14.27	
			Wind: (−1.3 m/s)	

==== Heat 2 ====
Place	Athlete	Nation	Time	Notes
1	Hawa Jalloh	Germany	13.29	Q
2	Celeste Polzonetti	Italy	13.40	Q
3	Anna Maria Millend	Estonia	13.43	Q
4	Cosmina Denisa Balaban	Romania	13.81	
5	Adi Onyalissi	Israel	14.28	
6	Meeri Riiali	Finland	14.45	
—	Lovise Skarbøvik Andresen	Norway	DNF	
—	Zuzanna Gozdera	Poland	DQ	TR 22.6.2
			Wind: (−2.5 m/s)	

==== Heat 3 ====
Place	Athlete	Nation	Time	Notes
1	Lerato Pages	Spain	13.18	Q
2	Rosina Schneider	Germany	13.39	Q
3	Essi Niskala	Finland	13.57	Q
4	Lana Andolšek	Slovenia	13.63	q
5	Rebecca Slezáková	Slovakia	13.78	
6	Valérie Guignard	Switzerland	13.80	
7	Alkyoni Zarokosta	Greece	14.04	
8	Karla Schärfe	Denmark	14.05	
			Wind: (−1.2 m/s)	

==== Heat 4 ====
Place	Athlete	Nation	Time	Notes
1	Anna Tóth	Hungary	13.28	Q
2	Paula Blanquer	Spain	13.46	Q
3	Isabelle Engel	Austria	13.66	Q
4	Júlía Kristín Jóhannesdóttir	Iceland	13.75	
5	Steffi de Saegher	Belgium	13.83	
6	Yaren Yildirim	Turkey	13.87	
7	Lucija Grd	Croatia	13.88	
8	Julia Håkansson	Sweden	14.17	
			Wind: (−1.5 m/s)	

==== Heat 5 ====
Place	Athlete	Nation	Time	Notes
1	Tereza Čorejová	Slovakia	13.14	Q
2	Natalia Szczęsna	Poland	13.16	Q
3	Fenna Achterberg	Netherlands	13.31	Q, =PB
4	Jenna Vakkilainen	Finland	13.53	q
5	Alina Frei	Switzerland	13.64	q
6	Elena Nessenzia	Italy	13.74	
7	Izabella Olofsson	Sweden	13.87	
8	Martha Neamoniti	Greece	14.22	
			Wind: (−1.3 m/s)	

==== Heat 6 ====
Place	Athlete	Nation	Time	Notes
1	Amira Never	Germany	13.15 [.147]	Q
2	Noor Koekelkoren	Belgium	13.15 [.150]	Q
3	Alina Kyshkina	Ukraine	13.17	Q, PB
4	Cansu Nimet Sayin	Turkey	13.35	q
5	Stella Derungs	Switzerland	13.39	q, PB
6	Sofia Kamperidou	Greece	13.47	q, PB
7	Neda Lasickaitė	Lithuania	13.72	PB
8	Nina Mayrhofer	Austria	13.93	
			Wind: (+0.5 m/s)	

=== Semi-finals ===
First 2 in each heat (Q) and the next 2 fastest (q) qualified for the final.

==== Heat 1 ====
Place	Athlete	Nation	Time	Notes
1	Anna Tóth	Hungary	13.07	Q
2	Rosina Schneider	Germany	13.23 [.221]	Q
3	Natalia Szczęsna	Poland	13.23 [.230]	q
4	Tereza Čorejová	Slovakia	13.26	q
5	Fenna Achterberg	Netherlands	13.51	
6	Essi Niskala	Finland	13.52	
7	Lana Andolšek	Slovenia	13.74	
8	Stella Derungs	Switzerland	13.78	
			Wind: (−2.2 m/s)	

==== Heat 2 ====
Place	Athlete	Nation	Time	Notes
1	Alicja Sielska	Poland	12.95	Q
2	Noor Koekelkoren	Belgium	13.25	Q
3	Hawa Jalloh	Germany	13.30	
4	Alina Kyshkina	Ukraine	13.37	
5	Paula Blanquer	Spain	13.40	
6	Isabelle Engel	Austria	13.65	
7	Alina Frei	Switzerland	13.68	
8	Cansu Nimet Sayin	Turkey	13.77	
			Wind: (−1.2 m/s)	

==== Heat 3 ====
Place	Athlete	Nation	Time	Notes
1	Lerato Pages	Spain	13.09	Q, PB
2	Amira Never	Germany	13.25	Q
3	Melissa Sereno	Portugal	13.27	
4	Celeste Polzonetti	Italy	13.29	
5	Auceane Bouijoux	France	13.30	
6	Anna Maria Millend	Estonia	13.39	
7	Sofia Kamperidou	Greece	13.71	
—	Jenna Vakkilainen	Finland	DNF	
			Wind: (−1.6 m/s)	

=== Final ===
Place	Athlete	Nation	Time	Notes
1st place, gold medalist(s)	Alicja Sielska	Poland	12.91	
2nd place, silver medalist(s)	Anna Tóth	Hungary	13.02	
3rd place, bronze medalist(s)	Tereza Čorejová	Slovakia	13.05	
4	Natalia Szczęsna	Poland	13.20	
5	Amira Never	Germany	13.22	
6	Lerato Pages	Spain	13.23	
7	Noor Koekelkoren	Belgium	13.38	
8	Rosina Schneider	Germany	13.71	
			Wind: (−1.7 m/s)	
