= Athletics at the 2025 Summer World University Games – Women's 100 metres hurdles =

Women's 100 metres hurdles at the 2025 Summer World University Games
- Venue: Lohrheidestadion
- Location: Bochum, Germany
- Dates: 24 July (heats); 25 July (semi-finals & final)
- Competitors: 32 from 25 nations
- Winning time: 12.88 [.872]

Medalists
gold medal	Saara Keskitalo	Finland
silver medal	Anna Tóth	Hungary
bronze medal	Alicja Sielska	Poland

The women's 100 metres hurdles event at the 2025 Summer World University Games was held in Bochum, Germany, at Lohrheidestadion on 24 and 25 July.

== Records ==
Prior to the competition, the records were as follows:

Record	Athlete (nation)	Time (s)	Location	Date
Games record	Vashti Thomas (USA)	12.61	Kazan, Russia	11 July 2013

== Results ==
=== Heats ===
First 4 in each heat (Q) and the next 4 fastest (q) qualified for the semi-finals.

==== Heat 1 ====
Place	Athlete	Nation	Time	Notes
1	Vilma Mäki	Finland	13.15	Q
2	Alicja Sielska	Poland	13.16	Q
3	Lucy-Jane Matthews	Great Britain	13.26	Q, SB
4	Alina Kyshkina	Ukraine	13.44	Q
5	Birgen Nelson	United States	13.46	q
6	Adenike Abiodun	Canada	13.53	
			Wind: (+0.6 m/s)	

==== Heat 2 ====
Place	Athlete	Nation	Time	Notes
1	Elena Carraro	Italy	12.90	Q
2	Ida Beiter Bomme	Denmark	13.04	Q
3	Laura Bankò	Hungary	13.13	Q
4	Zhang Bo-ya	Chinese Taipei	13.33	Q
5	Marli Jessop	Great Britain	13.39	q
6	Tyra Boug	Canada	13.52	
			Wind: (+2.5 m/s)	

==== Heat 3 ====
Place	Athlete	Nation	Time	Notes
1	Mao Shimano	Japan	13.04	Q
2	Yanla Ndjip-Nyemeck	Belgium	13.10	Q
3	Tereza Čorejová	Slovakia	13.21	Q
4	Delta Amidzovski	Australia	13.29	Q
5	Alva von Gerber	Sweden	13.33	q, PB
6	Moumita Mondal	India	13.37	q
7	Kayla van der Bergh	South Africa	13.67	
			Wind: (+0.5 m/s)	

==== Heat 4 ====
Place	Athlete	Nation	Time	Notes
1	Anna Tóth	Hungary	12.95	Q
2	Franziska Schuster	Germany	13.13	Q
3	Anna Maria Millend	Estonia	13.21	Q, PB
4	Rei Honda	Japan	13.42	Q
5	Chloe Pak Hoi-man	Hong Kong	13.99	SB
6	Emelia Surch	Australia	DNF	
7	Kristina Jermola	Kazakhstan	DQ	TR 22.6.2(K)
			Wind: (+0.6 m/s)	

==== Heat 5 ====
Place	Athlete	Nation	Time	Notes
1	Saara Keskitalo	Finland	12.82	Q
2	Rosina Schneider	Germany	13.18	Q
3	Larissa Bertényi	Switzerland	13.24	Q
4	Cansu Nimet Sayin	Turkey	13.49	Q
5	Daniela Lasmane	Latvia	14.05	PB
6	Thi Bich Ngoc Dao	Vietnam	14.28	
			Wind: (+1.3 m/s)	

=== Semi-finals ===
First 2 in each heat (Q) and the next 2 fastest (q) qualified for the final.

==== Heat 1 ====
Place	Athlete	Nation	Time	Notes
1	Elena Carraro	Italy	12.87	Q
2	Franziska Schuster	Germany	12.92	Q, PB
3	Laura Bankò	Hungary	13.08	q, PB
4	Vilma Mäki	Finland	13.12	
5	Larissa Bertényi	Switzerland	13.19	
6	Zhang Bo-ya	Chinese Taipei	13.48	
7	Marli Jessop	Great Britain	13.53	
8	Cansu Nimet Sayin	Turkey	13.65	
			Wind: (+1.1 m/s)	

==== Heat 2 ====
Place	Athlete	Nation	Time	Notes
1	Alicja Sielska	Poland	12.92	Q
2	Anna Tóth	Hungary	12.95	Q
3	Mao Shimano	Japan	13.11	q
4	Lucy-Jane Matthews	Great Britain	13.24	SB
5	Rosina Schneider	Germany	13.27	
6	Delta Amidzovski	Australia	13.34	
7	Moumita Mondal	India	13.42	
8	Alva von Gerber	Sweden	13.46	
			Wind: (+0.1 m/s)	

==== Heat 3 ====
Place	Athlete	Nation	Time	Notes
1	Saara Keskitalo	Finland	12.94 [.940]	Q
1	Yanla Ndjip-Nyemeck	Belgium	12.94 [.940]	Q
3	Rei Honda	Japan	13.17	
4	Ida Beiter Bomme	Denmark	13.22	
5	Tereza Čorejová	Slovakia	13.24	
6	Anna Maria Millend	Estonia	13.34	
7	Birgen Nelson	United States	13.47	
			Wind: (−1.0 m/s)	

=== Final ===
Place	Athlete	Nation	Time	Notes
1st place, gold medalist(s)	Saara Keskitalo	Finland	12.88 [.872]	
2nd place, silver medalist(s)	Anna Tóth	Hungary	12.88 [.877]	
3rd place, bronze medalist(s)	Alicja Sielska	Poland	12.95	
4	Yanla Ndjip-Nyemeck	Belgium	12.96	
5	Elena Carraro	Italy	12.98	
6	Franziska Schuster	Germany	13.03	
7	Mao Shimano	Japan	13.17	
8	Laura Bankò	Hungary	13.19	
			Wind: (+0.1 m/s)	
