= Danae Dyer =

American hurdler (born 2000)

Personal information
- Born: 26 April 2000 (age 26) San Diego, California, U.S.
- Home town: Temecula, California, U.S.
- Education: San Diego State University
- Height: 178 cm (5 ft 10 in)

Sport
- Sport: Athletics
- Event: Hurdles

Achievements and titles
- Personal best(s): 60m hurdles: 7.90 (2026); 100m hurdles: 12.98 (2024)

Danae Dyer (born 26 April 2000) is an American sprint hurdler. She placed second at the 2026 USA Indoor Track and Field Championships competing in the 60 metres hurdles to represent Team USA at 2026 World Athletics Indoor Championships.

== Biography ==
Dyer attended Temecula Valley High School in California, and in February 2018 won the 60 metres hurdles at the California Winter Outdoor Championships in 8.49 seconds. Later that year, Dyer set a meet record in winning the 100 metres hurdles in 13.90 seconds at the Inland Empire Championships.

Dyer later attended San Diego State University, where she won the 100 metres hurdles at the Mountain West Conference in 2021 and 2022 helping the San Diego State Aztecs win the overall conference title in both years. Dyer also won the women's 60m hurdles and as part of the 4 x 400 metres relay at the 2022 Mountain West Indoor Championships in Albuquerque, New Mexico, despite overcoming an emergency appendectomy prior to the championships.

Coaches by Shelia Burrell, in May 2024, Dyer won her Olympic Trial 100 metres hurdles qualifying race in Chula Vista in a personal best 12.98 seconds. Competing at the U.S. Olympic Trials, she was a semi-finalist, running 13.02 seconds in her heat and 13.08 seconds in the final.

Dyer placed second at the 2026 USA Indoor Track and Field Championships, finishing behind Alia Armstrong in a personal best 7.92 seconds. She was selected to represent the United States 60 metres hurdles at the 2026 World Athletics Indoor Championships in Toruń, Poland, qualifying for the semi-finals with a personal best 7.90 seconds, before placing fourth in her semi-final in 7.92.

Dyer ran a wind-assisted 12.75 (+3.2) for the 100 m hurdles in April 2026 at the Arkansas Spring Invitational, before winning the following week in 12.76 seconds at the Mt. SAC Relays in California, winning ahead of Keni Harrison and Aaliyah McCormick.

== Personal life ==
Dyer was born at Marine Corps Base Camp Pendleton to Andre and Dawn Dyer. Her father Andre died in April 2023. Alongside her athletics, Dyer has worked in Digital Marketing for Sports San Diego.
