= Jaiya Covington =

American hurdler (born 2001)

Personal information
- Born: 9 August 2003 (age 22)

Sport
- Sport: Athletics
- Event: Hurdles

Achievements and titles
- Personal bests: 60m hurdles: 7.90 (Virginia Beach, 2025); 100m hurdles: 12.86 (Baton Rouge, 2025)

Jaiya Covington (born 9 August 2003) is an American hurdler. She won the 60 metres hurdles title at the 2025 NCAA Championships.

== Biography ==
Covington attended Aldine Eisenhower High School in Houston, Texas, and was national age-group champion in the 100 metres hurdles at the AAU Junior Olympic Games in August 2021. She later attended Texas A&M University.

In March 2025, she won the 60 metres hurdles at the 2025 NCAA Division I Indoor Track and Field Championships in Virginia Beach, ahead of Aaliyah McCormick and Oneka Wilson, in 7.90 seconds. She finished 2025 ranked 13th in the world for the 60 metres hurdles due to that best time of 7.90 seconds.

She qualified for the final of the 100 metres hurdles at the 2025 NCAA Outdoor Championships in Eugene, Oregon, placing second overall behind Aaliyah McCormick, in 12.93 seconds.

She qualified for the 2026 NCAA Division I Indoor Track and Field Championships, placing fourth in 7.94 seconds in the 60 m hurdles final. In June, she qualified for the 2026 NCAA Outdoor Championships.
