= 2026 World Athletics Indoor Championships – Women's 60 metres hurdles =

Women's 60 metres hurdles at the 2026 World Athletics Indoor Championships
- Venue: Kujawsko-Pomorska Arena Toruń
- Location: Toruń, Poland
- Dates: 22 March
- Winning time: 7.65 =WR

Medalists
gold medal	Devynne Charlton	Bahamas
silver medal	Nadine Visser	Netherlands
bronze medal	Pia Skrzyszowska	Poland

The women's 60 metres hurdles at the 2026 World Athletics Indoor Championships took place on the short track of the Kujawsko-Pomorska Arena Toruń in Toruń, Poland, on 22 March 2026. This was the 22nd time the event was contested at the World Athletics Indoor Championships. Athletes could qualify by achieving the entry standard or by their World Athletics Ranking in the event.

== Background ==
The women's 60 metres hurdles was contested 21 times before 2026, at every previous edition of the World Athletics Indoor Championships.

Records before the 2026 World Athletics Indoor Championships
Record	Athlete (nation)	Time (s)	Location	Date
World record	Devynne Charlton (BAH)	7.65	Glasgow, United Kingdom	3 March 2024
Championship record	Devynne Charlton (BAH)	7.65	Glasgow, United Kingdom	3 March 2024
2026 World Lead	Devynne Charlton (BAH)	7.77	Toruń, Poland	22 February 2026

== Qualification ==
For the women's 60 metres hurdles, the qualification period ran from 1 November 2025 until 8 March 2026. Athletes could qualify by achieving the entry standard of 8.02 s. Athletes could also qualify by virtue of their World Athletics Ranking for the event or by virtue of their World Athletics Indoor Tour wildcard. There is a target number of 48 athletes.

== Results ==
=== Round 1 ===
Round 1 was held on 22 March, starting at 12:55 (UTC+1) in the morning.

==== Heat 1 ====
Place	Lane	Athlete	Nation	Time	Notes
1	4	Ditaji Kambundji	Switzerland	7.84	Q
2	5	Danae Dyer	United States	7.90	Q, PB
3	7	Kreete Verlin	Estonia	7.97	Q
4	1	Emma Nwofor	Great Britain	8.04	PB
5	8	Sarah Lavin	Ireland	8.08	
6	2	Elisa Maria Di Lazzaro	Italy	8.10	
7	3	Oneka Wilson	Jamaica	8.12	
8	6	Lana Andolšek	Slovenia	8.25	

==== Heat 2 ====
Place	Lane	Athlete	Nation	Time	Notes
1	3	Pia Skrzyszowska	Poland	7.84	Q
2	8	Luca Kozák	Hungary	7.88	Q, NR
3	4	Martine Hjørnevik	Norway	7.95	Q, PB
4	1	Sacha Alessandrini	France	7.96	q
5	2	Sienna MacDonald	Canada	8.03	q
6	5	Greisys Roble	Cuba	8.05	PB
7	6	Zhang Bo-ya	Chinese Taipei	8.23	
8	7	Nancy Sandoval	El Salvador	8.71	SB

==== Heat 3 ====
Place	Lane	Athlete	Nation	Time	Notes
1	4	Megan Simmonds	Netherlands	7.89	Q
2	5	Laëticia Bapté	France	7.96 [.954]	Q
3	1	Denisha Cartwright	Bahamas	7.96 [.960]	Q, SB
4	3	Mariam Abdul-Rashid	Canada	8.00	q, SB
5	2	Karin Strametz	Austria	8.03	
6	6	Myreanna Bebe	Haiti	8.08	
7	8	Júlía Kristín Jóhannesdóttir	Iceland	8.11	NR
8	7	Jéssica Barreira	Portugal	8.29	

==== Heat 4 ====
Place	Lane	Athlete	Nation	Time	Notes
1	5	Devynne Charlton	Bahamas	7.82	Q
2	8	Ida Beiter Bomme	Denmark	7.89	Q, NR
3	2	María Fernanda Murillo	Colombia	7.95	Q, NR
4	3	Maayke Tjin A-Lim	Netherlands	8.04	
5	6	Vitoria Alves	Brazil	8.09	
6	7	Evonne Britton	Ghana	8.15	
7	4	Victoria Rausch	Luxembourg	8.18	
8	7	Jéssica Barreira	Portugal	8.29	

==== Heat 5 ====
Place	Lane	Athlete	Nation	Time	Notes
1	3	Nadine Visser	Netherlands	7.82	Q
2	8	Yanla Ndjip-Nyemeck	Belgium	7.93	Q
3	6	Charisma Taylor	Bahamas	7.97	Q, SB
4	5	Michelle Jenneke	Australia	7.98	q, SB
5	4	Lovise Skarbøvik Andresen	Norway	7.99	q, PB
6	7	Ricarda Lobe	Germany	8.03	
7	1	Chisato Kiyoyama	Japan	8.15	
8	2	Tereza Čorejová	Slovakia	8.18	

==== Heat 6 ====
Place	Lane	Athlete	Nation	Time	Notes
1	6	Alia Armstrong	United States	7.85	Q
2	7	Marlene Meier	Germany	7.96	Q
3	1	Nika Glojnarič	Slovenia	7.99	Q
4	3	Mako Fukube	Japan	8.02	q, PB
5	8	Giada Carmassi	Italy	8.05	
6	4	Larissa Bertényi	Switzerland	8.13	
7	5	Ketiley Batista	Brazil	8.25	
8	2	Shing Cho Yan	Hong Kong	8.34	

=== Semi-finals ===
The semi-finals were held on 22 March, starting at 18:52 (UTC+1) in the evening.

==== Heat 1 ====
Place	Lane	Athlete	Nation	Time	Notes
1	4	Nadine Visser	Netherlands	7.82 [.812]	Q
2	5	Megan Simmonds	Jamaica	7.82 [.815]	Q, PB
3	3	Marlene Meier	Germany	7.91 [.903]	q, PB
4	2	Charisma Taylor	Bahamas	7.91 [.908]	PB
5	7	Martine Hjørnevik	Norway	7.97	
6	1	Sacha Alessandrini	France	7.98	
7	6	Luca Kozák	Hungary	8.01	
8	8	Sienna MacDonald	Canada	8.05	

==== Heat 2 ====
Place	Lane	Athlete	Nation	Time	Notes
1	6	Pia Skrzyszowska	Poland	7.76 [.752]	Q, WL
2	4	Ditaji Kambundji	Switzerland	7.76 [.755]	Q, WL
3	2	Denisha Cartwright	Bahamas	7.90	q, SB
4	3	Danae Dyer	United States	7.92	
5	5	Yanla Ndjip-Nyemeck	Belgium	7.99	
6	7	Kreete Verlin	Estonia	8.01	
7	1	Lovise Skarbøvik Andresen	Norway	8.04	
8	8	Mariam Abdul-Rashid	Canada	8.35	

==== Heat 3 ====
Place	Lane	Athlete	Nation	Time	Notes
1	3	Devynne Charlton	Bahamas	7.74	Q, WL
2	6	Alia Armstrong	United States	7.84	Q
3	4	Ida Beiter Bomme	Denmark	7.97 [.961]	
4	7	María Fernanda Murillo	Colombia	7.97 [.962]	
5	5	Laëticia Bapté	France	7.97 [.964]	
6	8	Michelle Jenneke	Australia	8.02	
7	1	Mako Fukube	Japan	8.06 [.052]	
7	2	Nika Glojnarič	Slovenia	8.06 [.052]	

=== Final ===
The final was held on 22 March, starting at 20:13 (UTC+1) in the evening.

Place	Lane	Athlete	Nation	Time	Notes
1	6	Devynne Charlton	Bahamas	7.65	=WR
2	3	Nadine Visser	Netherlands	7.73 [.723]	SB
3	5	Pia Skrzyszowska	Poland	7.73 [.728]	NR
4	4	Ditaji Kambundji	Switzerland	7.75	SB
5	7	Megan Simmonds	Jamaica	7.82	
6	2	Alia Armstrong	United States	7.85	
7	1	Denisha Cartwright	Bahamas	7.90 [.898]	SB
7	8	Marlene Meier	Germany	7.90 [.898]	PB
