= Yanla Ndjip-Nyemeck =

Belgian hurdler

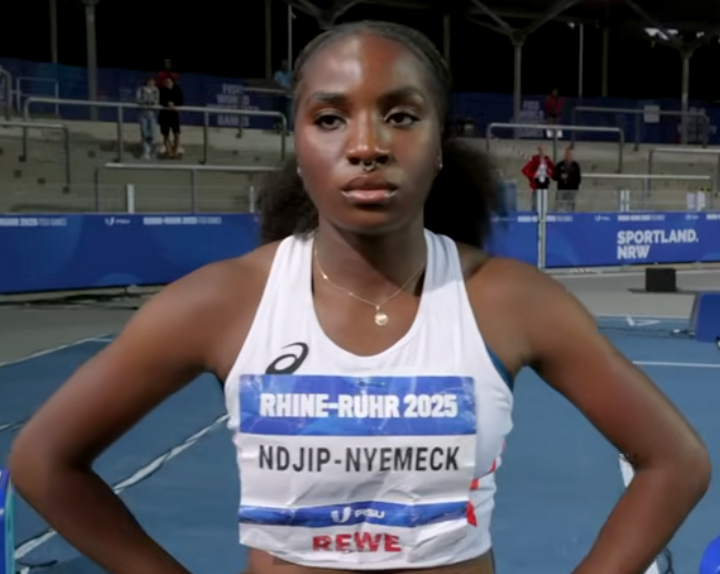
- At the 2025 Summer World University Games

Personal information
- Born: 12 July 2002 (age 24)

Sport
- Sport: Athletics
- Event: Hurdles

Achievements and titles
- Personal bests: 60m hurdles 7.92 (2026); 100m hurdles 12.71 (2025) NR

Yanla Ndjip-Nyemeck (born 12 July 2002) is a Belgian hurdler. She won the Belgian Athletics Championships in the 100 metres hurdles in 2023. She represented Belgium in the 60 metres hurdles at the 2024 World Athletics Indoor Championships. She equalled the Belgian national record for the 100 metres hurdles in 2025.

== Early life ==
She is from Brussels and was born in Anderlecht, but moved to France at the age of 12 years-old. She moved to the United States in 2019 where she studied sociology studies at the University of California, Los Angeles. She is of Cameroonian descent.

== Career ==
She set a personal best in the 60 metres hurdles of 8.01 seconds during the winter indoor season of 2023. She won the Belgian Athletics Championships in the 100 metres hurdles in July 2023 in Bruges. That month, she made her international debut representing Belgium at the European Athletics U23 Championships in Espoo, Finland.

She competed for Belgium in the 60 metres hurdles at the 2024 World Athletics Indoor Championships in Glasgow, but crashed out after striking a hurdle in her heat.

In April 2025, she lowered her personal best 12.87 (wind: 0.0 m/s) in the 100m hurdles at the Mt. Sac Relays in Walnut, California, to move to third on the Belgian all-time list.

She equaled the Belgian 100m hurdles national record of 12.71 seconds (+1.5 m/s) in the semi-finals of the 2025 NCAA Outdoor Championships in Eugene, Oregon on 12 June 2025. The national record time had been first set by Anne Zagré in 2015. Competing at the 2025 Summer World University Games in Germany she placed fourth in the 100 metres hurdles final, her time of 12.96 seconds being one hundredth of a second slower than bronze medal winner Alicja Sielska of Poland. In September, she was a semi-finalist at the 2025 World Athletics Championships in Tokyo, Japan.

Runner-up over 60 m hurdles to Myreanna Bebe at the 2026 Tyson Invitational in 8.00 seconds, she set a personal best 7.96 seconds at the 2026 Dr. Martin Luther King Jr. Invitational in Alburquerque. She placed second in a new personal best 7.92 seconds at the 2026 NCAA Division I Indoor Track and Field Championships, finishing behind Aaliyah McCormick. In March 2026, she ran in the 60 metres hurdles at the 2026 World Athletics Indoor Championships in Toruń, Poland, reaching the semi-finals. In August 2026, she competed at the 2026 European Athletics Championships in Birmingham, England, in the women's 100 metres hurdles, reaching the final and placing seventh overall.
