= Elena Carraro =

Italian hurdler (born 2001)

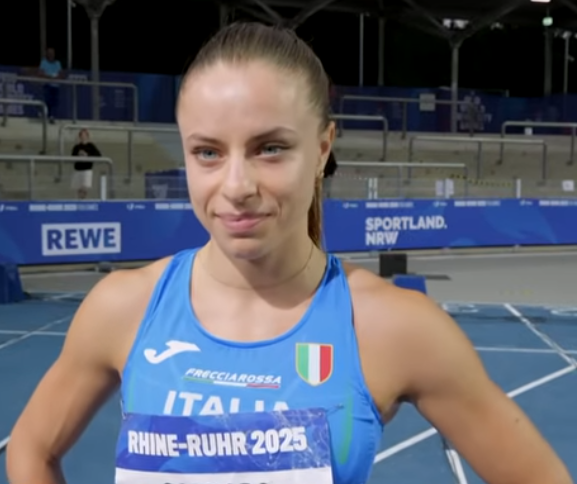
- At the 2025 Summer World University Games

Personal information
- Nationality: Italy
- Born: 3 January 2001 (age 25)
- Home town: Palazzolo sull'Oglio, Brescia, Italy
- Education: Università Iuav di Venezia
- Height: 165 cm (5 ft 5 in)
- Weight: 55 kg (121 lb)

Sport
- Sport: Athletics
- Events: 100 metres hurdles 60 metres hurdles
- Club: Atletica Brescia 1950
- Coached by: Andrea Uberti

Achievements and titles
- National finals: 2018 Italian Indoor U18s; • 60m hurdles, 2nd (silver); 2018 Italian U18s; • 100m hurdles, 2nd (silver); 2019 Italian Indoor U20s; • 60m hurdles, 1st (gold); 2019 Italian U20s; • 100m hurdles, 2nd (silver); 2020 Italian U20s; • 100m hurdles, 2nd (silver); 2021 Italian Champs; • 100m hurdles, 4th; 2022 Italian Indoor U23s; • 60m hurdles, 1st (gold); 2022 Italian Indoors; • 60m hurdles, 3rd (bronze); 2022 Italian Champs; • 100m hurdles, 3rd (bronze); 2023 Italian Indoor U23s; • 60m hurdles, 2nd (silver); 2023 Italian Indoors; • 60m hurdles, 7th; 2023 Italian U23s; • 100m hurdles, 1st (gold); 2023 Italian Champs; • 100m hurdles, 2nd (silver); 2024 Italian Indoors; • 60m hurdles, 7th
- Personal bests: 100 m hs: 12.84 (2025); 60 m hs: 8.17 (2023)
Medal record
Women's athletics
Representing Italy
European U23 Championships
| Silver medal – second place | 2023 Espoo | 100 m hurdles |
Mediterranean Games
| Silver medal – second place | 2026 Taranto | 100 m hurdles |
- Updated on 20 February 2024

Elena Carraro (born 3 January 2001) is an Italian hurdler specializing in the 100 metres hurdles. She is an indoor and outdoor Italian U23 Championships winner, and she won the silver medal in the 100 m hurdles at the 2023 European Athletics U23 Championships.

== Career ==
Cararro began competing in the hurdles in 2017, failing to qualify for the finals of the 2017 Italian U18 Championships. The following year, she advanced to the finals and finished 2nd, qualifying her to represent Italy at the 2018 European Athletics U18 Championships. At the championships, she fell on the fourth hurdle and did not finish her heat.

Cararro won her first national title in 2019, in the 60 m hurdles at the Italian U20 Indoor Championships. A silver medal at the 2019 Italian U20 Outdoor Championships qualified her for the 2019 European Athletics U20 Championships. At the championships, she placed 6th in her heat and did not advance, splitting a 14.25 mark that was far off her previous times that season.

After a 7th-place finish at the COVID-19 pandemic-delayed Italian U20 Championships in 2020, Cararro finished 4th at her first senior Italian Athletics Championships in 2021. She went on to compete at the 2021 European Athletics U23 Championships, this time advancing from the first round but placing 5th in her semifinal.

Cararro qualified for her first senior national team in 2022, representing Italy at the 2022 Mediterranean Games by virtue of placing 3rd at the 2022 Italian Athletics Championships. At the Games, she qualified for the finals by winning her heat. In the finals, she collided with the third barrier, slowing her down to place 7th overall.

Cararro began her 2023 season by representing Italy at the Mediterranean U23 Indoor Championships. She qualified for the finals, but only placing 6th overall and sustained a muscle injury during the race. Following that, she won the Italian U23 Championships in a personal best of 12.89 seconds. The time was an Italian under-23 record, also making her the first Italian U23 athlete to break the 13-second barrier and the fourth-fastest Italian woman of all time. The previous record-holder Veronica Besana led the race early on, but was passed after two hurdles by Carraro.

The time qualified Cararro for the 2023 European Athletics U23 Championships in Espoo. She ran 12.97 seconds in the final to edge out Anna Tóth, winning the silver medal behind Ditaji Kambundji and falling after finishing the race.

== Personal life ==
Carraro is from Palazzolo sull'Oglio, Brescia, Italy where she competes for the Atletica Brescia 1950 club coached by Andrea Uberti. After trying various sports including artistic gymnastics, she began competing in athletics during her seventh year of school. She attended the Università Iuav di Venezia where she studied graphic design and architecture, graduating in 2023.

== Statistics ==
=== Personal best progression ===
100m Hurdles progression
| # | Mark | Pl. | Competition | Venue | Date | Ref. |
|---|---|---|---|---|---|---|
| 1 | 14.22 | 1st place, gold medalist(s) | Cinisello Balsamo Regional Athletics Championships | Cinisello Balsamo, Italy | 25 May 2018 | |
| 2 | 14.11 | 4th | C.D.S. Assoluto Femminile – Prova Regionale | Mariano Comense, Italy | 10 May 2019 | |
| 3 | 13.91 | 2nd place, silver medalist(s) | Trofeo Bracco | Cinisello Balsamo, Italy | 24 May 2019 | |
| 4 | 13.86 | 2nd place, silver medalist(s) | Italian U20 Athletics Championships | Rieti, Italy | 7 Jun 2019 | |
| 5 | 13.70 | 3rd place, bronze medalist(s) | Meeting Brazzale | Vicenza, Italy | 10 Jul 2020 | |
| 6 | 13.66 | 3rd place, bronze medalist(s) | Meeting Internazionale Città Di Nembro | Nembro, Italy | 16 Jun 2021 | |
| 7 | 13.63 | 1st place, gold medalist(s) | Meeting Di Primavera | Mondovì, Italy | 19 Jun 2021 | |
| 8 | 13.39 | 4th | Italian Athletics Championships | Rovereto, Italy | 25 Jun 2021 | |
| 9 | 13.19 | 1st place, gold medalist(s) | Trofeo Liberazione | Modena, Italy | 24 Apr 2022 | |
| 10 | 13.13 | 4th | Meeting Internazionale Città Di Savona | Savona, Italy | 17 May 2022 | |
| 11 | 13.09 | 1st place, gold medalist(s) | Meeting Della Leonessa Memorial Davide Boroni | Brescia, Italy | 3 Jun 2023 | |
| 12 | 12.89 | 1st place, gold medalist(s) | Italian U23 Athletics Championships | Agropoli, Italy | 16 Jun 2023 | |

=== National titles ===
Carraro has won a national championship at individual senior level

- Italian Athletics Championships
  - 100 m hs: 2025

== See also ==
- List of Italian records in athletics
