= 2023 European Athletics U23 Championships – Women's 100 metres hurdles =

Women's 100 metres hurdles at the 2023 European Athletics U23 Championships
- Venue: Leppävaara Stadium
- Location: Espoo, Finland
- Dates: 14 July (heats & semi-finals); 15 July (final)
- Competitors: 37 from 20 nations
- Winning time: 12.68

Medalists
gold medal	Ditaji Kambundji	Switzerland
silver medal	Elena Carraro	Italy
bronze medal	Anna Tóth	Hungary

The women's 100 metres hurdles event at the 2023 European Athletics U23 Championships was held in Espoo, Finland, at Leppävaara Stadium on 14 and 15 July.

== Records ==
Prior to the competition, the records were as follows:

European U23 record	Pia Skrzyszowska (POL)	12.51	Chorzów, Poland	6 August 2022
Championship U23 record	Elvira Herman (BLR)	12.70	Gävle, Sweden	12 July 2019

== Results ==
=== Round 1 ===
Qualification rule: First 2 in each heat (Q) and the next 6 fastest (q) advance to the Semi-Finals.

Wind:
Heat 1: -0.3 m/s, Heat 2: -0.4 m/s, Heat 3: +1.5 m/s, Heat 4: +1.7 m/s, Heat 5: +0.1 m/s

Rank	Heat	Name	Nationality	Time	Notes
1	4	Veronica Besana	Italy	12.90	Q, PB
2	4	Anna Tóth	Hungary	13.06	Q
3	1	Ditaji Kambundji	Switzerland	13.07	Q
4	5	Elena Carraro	Italy	13.10	Q
5	3	Laura Bankó	Hungary	13.22	Q, PB
6	4	Paula Blanquer	Spain	13.23	q, PB
7	5	Claudia Villalante	Spain	13.26	Q, PB
8	2	Weronika Nagięć	Poland	13.27	Q
9	3	Yanla Ndjip-Nyemeck	Belgium	13.28	Q
10	1	Franziska Schuster	Germany	13.31	Q
11	1	Tereza Elena Šínová	Czech Republic	13.44	q
12	1	Weronika Barcz	Poland	13.50	q
13	4	Ingrid Pernille Rismark	Norway	13.50	q
14	2	Iryna Budzynska	Ukraine	13.52	Q
15	3	Martina Cuccú	Italy	13.54	q, PB
16	3	Anisiya Lochman	Ukraine	13.56	q, PB
17	2	Meret Baumgartner	Switzerland	13.61	
18	4	Annika Haldbo	Denmark	13.62	PB
19	1	Vilma Mäki	Finland	13.64	
20	5	Martine Hjørnevik	Norway	13.66	
21	4	Dana Maria Govoreanu	Romania	13.68	
22	2	Viktória Forster	Slovakia	13.69	
22	5	Tanja Kokkonen	Finland	13.69	
24	2	Sonja Stång	Finland	13.72	
24	3	Maja Maunsbach	Sweden	13.72	
26	2	Iulia-Dariana Grigoroiu	Romania	13.78	
27	4	Cansu Nimet Sayin	Turkey	13.83	
28	3	Lena Lackner	Austria	13.86	SB
29	5	Izabella Navodnik	Slovenia	13.98	
30	5	Gabija Klimukaitė	Lithuania	14.05	
31	2	Hannah Krawanja	Austria	14.14	
32	3	Maëva Tahou	Switzerland	14.32	
33	1	Yaren Yildirim	Turkey	14.38	
	5	Ida Beiter Bomme	Denmark	DNF	
	3	Abigail Pawlett	Great Britain	DNF	
	1	Krystyna Yurchuk	Ukraine	DQ	
	5	Marika Majewska	Poland	DQ	

=== Semifinals ===
Qualification rule: First 3 in each heat (Q) and the next 2 fastest (q) advance to the Final.

Wind:
Heat 1: +0.4 m/s, Heat 2: 0.0 m/s

Rank	Heat	Name	Nationality	Time	Notes
1	1	Ditaji Kambundji	Switzerland	12.83	Q
2	1	Elena Carraro	Italy	12.98	Q
3	2	Veronica Besana	Italy	12.98	Q
4	1	Anna Tóth	Hungary	12.99	Q
5	2	Franziska Schuster	Germany	13.16	Q, PB
6	1	Weronika Nagięć	Poland	13.17	q
7	2	Claudia Villalante	Spain	13.20	Q, PB
8	1	Paula Blanquer	Spain	13.21	q, PB
9	1	Iryna Budzynska	Ukraine	13.34	PB
10	2	Laura Bankó	Hungary	13.37	
11	2	Tereza Elena Šínová	Czech Republic	13.43	
12	2	Weronika Barcz	Poland	13.61	
13	1	Ingrid Pernille Rismark	Norway	13.66	
14	2	Yanla Ndjip-Nyemeck	Belgium	13.71	
15	1	Martina Cuccú	Italy	13.89	
16	2	Anisiya Lochman	Ukraine	13.91	

=== Final ===
Wind: 0.0 m/s

Rank	Lane	Name	Nationality	Time	Notes
1st place, gold medalist(s)	3	Ditaji Kambundji	Switzerland	12.68	CR
2nd place, silver medalist(s)	4	Elena Carraro	Italy	12.97	
3rd place, bronze medalist(s)	2	Anna Tóth	Hungary	12.97	
4	5	Franziska Schuster	Germany	13.11	PB
5	1	Paula Blanquer	Spain	13.22	
6	8	Weronika Nagięć	Poland	13.28	
7	7	Claudia Villalante	Spain	13.31	
	6	Veronica Besana	Italy		DNF
