= Tamara Clark =

American sprinter (born 1999)

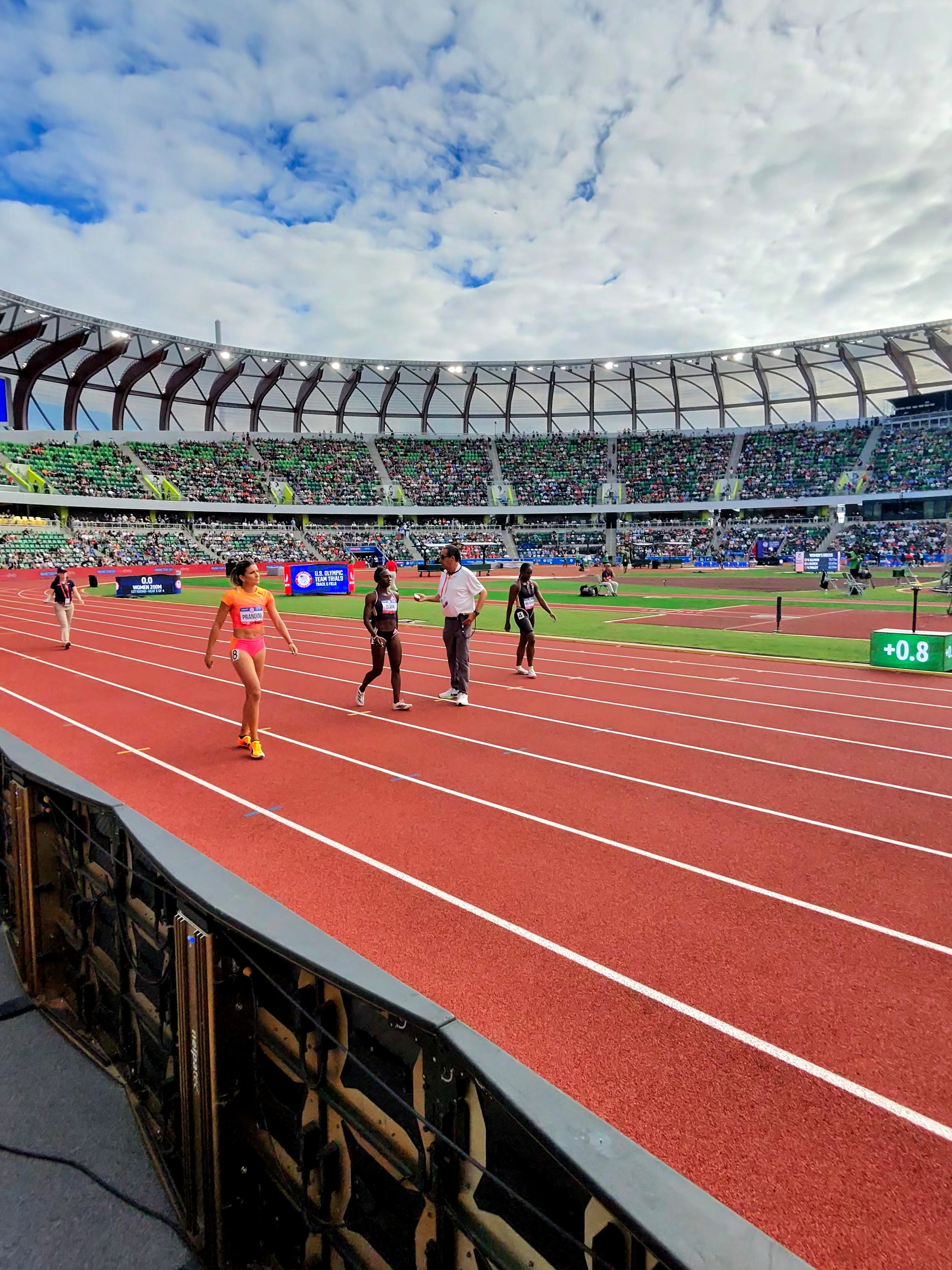
- Clark in 2024

Personal information
- Nationality: American
- Born: 9 January 1999 (age 27) High Point, North Carolina, U.S.

Sport
- Sport: Track and field
- Event: 200 metres
Medal record
Women's athletics
Representing the United States
World Championships
Gold medal – first place	2023 Budapest	4 × 100 m relay

Tamara Clark (born 9 January 1999) is an American track and field athlete who competes as a sprinter.

== High school ==
Clark attended High Point Central High School in High Point, North Carolina. She was a two-time North Carolina High School Athletic Association (NCHSAA) 4A outdoor state champion in the 100 meters and 200 meters in 2016 and 2017 and a two-time NCHSAA 4A indoor state champion in the 55 meters and 300 meters in 2016 and 2017. She won relay state championships in the indoor 4 × 200 and 4 × 400 relay in 2017 and outdoor 4 × 100 meter relay in 2017. Clark was also an AAU national champion in the 100 meters and 200 meters in 2016.

== College and professional career ==
Representing the University of Alabama, Clark received five All-American awards and swept the 100 and 200 meters at the 2021 SEC Championships before making her Diamond League debut in 2021 in the 200 metres in Monaco. Clark finished in second place at the 2022 USATF Championships in the 200 metres to qualify for the 2022 World Athletics Championships, and cried with relief after missing out on a spot on the US Olympic team the year previous by one place. Clark was also named in the pool for the 4 × 100-meter relay for the event in Eugene, Oregon. Clark won her heat in a time 22.27, edging former world champion Dina Asher-Smith into second, to qualify for the semi-finals, before then reaching the final and finishing sixth overall on her major event debut.

She was selected for the 2023 World Athletics Championships in Budapest in August 2023.

In April 2024, she was selected as part of the American team for the 2024 World Athletics Relays in Nassau, Bahamas.

She reached the semi-finals of the 100 metres at the 2025 USA Outdoor Track and Field Championships, running her heat in 11.18 seconds (+1.8 m/s). After running her semi-final in 11.14 seconds (+1.1) she returned to place seventh in the final in 11.11 (+0.4). She was selected for the American team for the 2025 World Athletics Championships in Tokyo, Japan, as part of the relay pool.

== Personal records ==
Tamara Clark's current personal best in the 100 m is 10.88. While in the 200 m race, it is 21.92.

== Statistics ==
Grand Slam Track results
Slam	Race group	Event	Pl.	Time	Prize money
2025 Kingston Slam	Short sprints	100 m	7th	11.58	US$10,000
2025 Kingston Slam	Short sprints	200 m		DNS	US$10,000
