= Franziska Schuster =

German hurdler

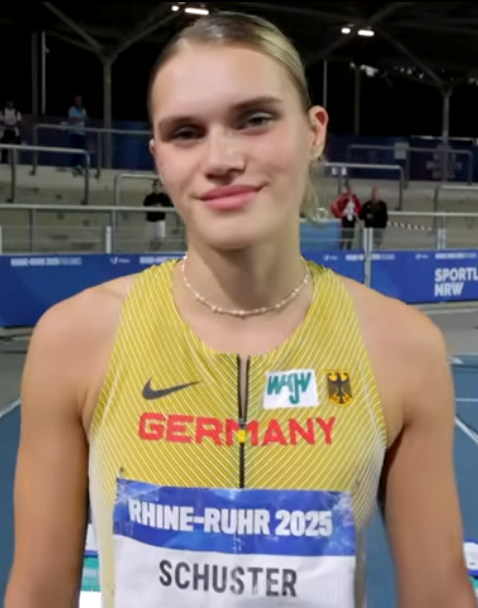
- Schuster in 2025

Personal information
- Nationality: German
- Born: 22 February 2002 (age 24)
- Height: 1.73 m (5 ft 8 in)

Sport
- Sport: Athletics
- Event: Hurdles
- Club: TSV Bayer o4 Leverkusen

Achievements and titles
- Personal bests: 60 m hurdles: 8.03 (2026); 100 m hurdles: 12.91 (2026)

Franziska Schuster (born 22 February 2002) is a German hurdler. She won the German Athletics Championships in the 100 metres hurdles in 2023.

== Biography ==
A member of TSV Bayer 04 Leverkusen, Schuster is from Xanten and started in athletics at primary school. By 2017, she was top of the German Athletics Association (DLV) rankings in her age group for the high hurdles. She won a silver medal at the 2019 European Youth Olympic Festival in Baku, Azerbaijan, in the 100 metres hurdles. In 2021, she won both the German Youth Championships and the German U23 title and represented Germany at the 2021 European Athletics U20 Championships in Tallinn, Finland.

Schuster won the senior German Athletics Championships national title in 2023, running 13.17 for the 100 metres hurdles in Kassel. She placed fourth in the final of the 2023 European Athletics U23 Championships in Espoo, Finland, running a personal best 13.11 seconds for the 100 metres hurdles in the final.

Having opened her 2024 season with a time of 8.18 seconds for the 60 metres hurdles competing in Luxembourg, she placed third in the discipline at the 2024 German Indoor Athletics Championships. However, Schuster was unable to compete in the rest of 2024 after being diagnosed with mononucleosis. Returning to action in 2025 she lowered her personal best to below 13 seconds for the 100 metres hurdles for the first time while competing in Regensburg. Schuster represented Germany at the 2025 World Summer University Games in Bochum, qualifying for the final and placing sixth overall.

In August 2026, she competed at the 2026 European Athletics Championships in Birmingham, England, in the women's 100 metres hurdles, reaching the semi-finals.

== Personal life ==
In 2020, she began to study Biology at the University of Cologne.
