= 2021 World Athletics U20 Championships – Women's 100 metres hurdles =

Women's 100 metres hurdles at the 2021 World Athletics U20 Championships
- Venue: Kasarani Stadium
- Dates: 20 August (heats and semifinals); 21 August (final)
- Competitors: 33 from 26 nations
- Winning time: 12.95

Medalists
gold medal	Ackera Nugent	Jamaica
silver medal	Anna Maria Millend	Estonia
bronze medal	Anna Tóth	Hungary

The women's 100 metres hurdles at the 2021 World Athletics U20 Championships was held at the Kasarani Stadium on 20 and 21 August.

== Records ==
Standing records prior to the 2021 World Athletics U20 Championships
World U20 Record	Britany Anderson (JAM)	12.71	Joensuu, Finland	24 July 2019
Championship Record	Elvira Herman (BLR)	12.85	Bydgoszcz, Poland	24 July 2016
World U20 Leading	Ackera Nugent (JAM)	12.76	College Station, United States	29 May 2021

== Results ==
=== Heats ===
Qualification: First 4 of each heat (Q) and the 4 fastest times (q) qualified for the semifinals.

Wind:
Heat 1: +0.2 m/s, Heat 2: -0.6 m/s, Heat 3: +0.1 m/s, Heat 4: +0.5 m/s, Heat 5: +0.2 m/s

Rank	Heat	Name	Nationality	Time	Note
1	3	Ditaji Kambundji	Switzerland	13.30	Q
2	2	Ackera Nugent	Jamaica	13.35	Q
3	5	Oneka Wilson	Jamaica	13.36	Q, PB
4	5	Anna Maria Millend	Estonia	13.56	Q, PB
5	1	Marika Majewska	Poland	13.58	Q
6	4	Marione Fourie	South Africa	13.64	Q
7	5	Weronika Barcz	Poland	13.65	Q
8	2	Anna Tóth	Hungary	13.67	Q
9	4	Aitana Radsma	Spain	13.67	Q
10	3	Viktória Forster	Slovakia	13.75	Q
11	3	Sonja Stång	Finland	13.82	Q
12	4	Giovana Corradi	Brazil	13.95	Q, PB
13	1	Veronica Besana	Italy	13.97	Q
14	5	Tanja Kokkonen	Finland	13.97	Q
15	3	Dana-Maria Govoreanu	Romania	14.00	Q
16	1	Madina Toure	Burkina Faso	14.00	Q
17	3	Gabija Klimukaitė	Lithuania	14.03	q, PB
18	1	Yaren Yıldırım	Turkey	14.06	Q
19	1	Marta Marksa	Latvia	14.09	q
20	1	Klara Loessl	Denmark	14.12	q
21	4	Nandini Agasara	India	14.18	Q
22	2	Giorgia Marcomin	Italy	14.26	Q
23	3	Cansu Nimet Sayın	Turkey	14.26	q
24	2	Annika Haldbo	Denmark	14.33	Q
25	5	Daniele Campigotto	Brazil	14.49	
26	2	Eva Murn	Slovenia	14.51	
27	3	Rahil Hamel	Algeria	14.64	
28	4	Krystyna Yurchuk	Ukraine	14.83	
29	1	Agnes Mutindi Ngumbi	Kenya	15.72	PB
30	2	Isabel Urrutia	Colombia	19.43	
	4	Ester Bendová	Czech Republic	DNF	
	4	Jaclyn González Mendoza	Mexico	DNF	
	2	Léa Vendôme	France	DNF	
	5	Kayla van der Bergh	South Africa	DNS	

=== Semifinals ===
Qualification: First 2 of each heat (Q) and the 2 fastest times (q) qualified for the final.

Wind:
Heat 1: +0.3 m/s, Heat 2: +0.3 m/s, Heat 3: +0.3 m/s

Rank	Heat	Name	Nationality	Time	Note
1	3	Ackera Nugent	Jamaica	13.02	Q
2	2	Ditaji Kambundji	Switzerland	13.02	Q
3	3	Weronika Barcz	Poland	13.36	Q, PB
4	1	Oneka Wilson	Jamaica	13.39	Q
5	2	Anna Maria Millend	Estonia	13.44	Q, NU20R
6	2	Anna Tóth	Hungary	13.46	q, PB
7	2	Sonja Stång	Finland	13.59	q
8	1	Viktória Forster	Slovakia	13.59	Q
9	3	Marione Fourie	South Africa	13.60	
10	3	Aitana Radsma	Spain	13.68	
11	1	Tanja Kokkonen	Finland	13.81	
12	1	Gabija Klimukaitė	Lithuania	13.84	PB
13	1	Dana-Maria Govoreanu	Romania	13.87	
14	1	Marika Majewska	Poland	13.91	
15	2	Yaren Yıldırım	Turkey	13.93	
16	1	Marta Marksa	Latvia	14.00	
17	1	Veronica Besana	Italy	14.01	
18	3	Cansu Nimet Sayın	Turkey	14.08	
19	2	Nandini Agasara	India	14.16	
20	3	Annika Haldbo	Denmark	14.20	
21	3	Giorgia Marcomin	Italy	14.26	
22	3	Madina Toure	Burkina Faso	14.96	
	2	Klara Loessl	Denmark	DNF	
	2	Giovana Corradi	Brazil	DNS	

=== Final ===
The final was held on 21 August at 16:00.

Wind: +0.8 m/s

Rank	Lane	Name	Nationality	Time	Note
1st place, gold medalist(s)	7	Ackera Nugent	Jamaica	12.95	
2nd place, silver medalist(s)	9	Anna Maria Millend	Estonia	13.45	
3rd place, bronze medalist(s)	3	Anna Tóth	Hungary	13.58	
4	2	Sonja Stång	Finland	13.63	
	5	Weronika Barcz	Poland	DNF	
	8	Viktória Forster	Slovakia	DQ	TR22.6.2
	6	Ditaji Kambundji	Switzerland	DQ	TR22.6.2
	4	Oneka Wilson	Jamaica	DNS	
