= 2025 Kingston Slam =

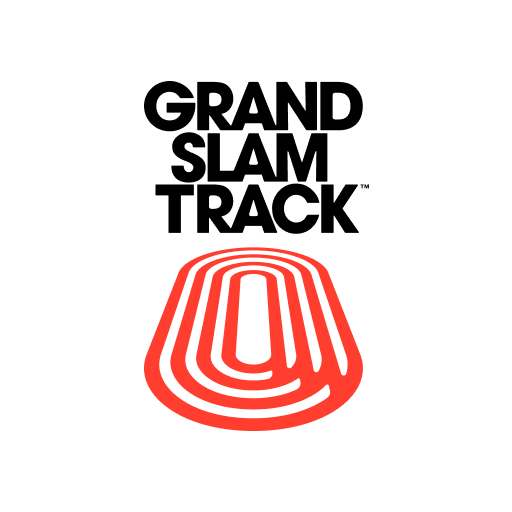
- Organisers: Grand Slam Track
- Dates: 4–6 April 2025
- Host city: Kingston, Jamaica
- Venue: Independence Park
- Events: 12
- Participation: 96 athletes
- Official website: Grand Slam Track

The 2025 Kingston Slam was an outdoor track and field meeting held from 4–6 April 2025 in The National Stadium, Kingston, Jamaica. It was the inaugural meet of the 2025 Grand Slam Track season, the debut season of Michael Johnson's Grand Slam Track league.

The city was confirmed as the first Grand Slam Track leg on 11 November 2024. It was the second of four cities to be announced, after the Los Angeles Slam was announced as part of the league's launch. A full field of 96 athletes from 20 countries to compete at the meet was announced on 13 March, though ten scratches and replacements were announced on 31 March.

The meeting offered US$100,000 of prize money for the winners of each of six men's and six women's event groups, in addition to appearance fees and league salaries. The meet was billed by the media as a test of the Grand Slam Track series' viability and the broader popularity of track and field in North America.

Some signed racers, including Devon Allen and Luis Grijalva, missed the Kingston Slam due to injuries. Additional challengers stepped in as replacements.

== Slam winners ==
Key: (R) = Racer / (C) = Challenger

| Race group | Men | Women |
|---|---|---|
| Short Sprints | Kenny Bednarek (USA) (R) | Melissa Jefferson-Wooden (USA) (R) |
| Short Hurdles | Sasha Zhoya (FRA) (R) | Danielle Williams (JAM) (C) |
| Long Sprints | Matthew Hudson-Smith (GBR) (R) | Gabrielle Thomas (USA) (R) |
| Long Hurdles | Alison dos Santos (BRA) (R) | Sydney McLaughlin-Levrone (USA) (R) |
| Short Distance | Emmanuel Wanyonyi (KEN) (C) | Diribe Welteji (ETH) (R) |
| Long Distance | Grant Fisher (USA) (R) | Ejgayehu Taye (ETH) (C) |

== Men's results ==
=== Short sprints ===
The 100 metres race was held on 4 April, starting at 20:21 (UTC−5).

100 Metres
| Place | Athlete | Nation | Time | Points | Notes |
|---|---|---|---|---|---|
| 1 | Kenny Bednarek (R) | United States | 10.07 | 12 | CR |
| 2 | Oblique Seville (R) | Jamaica | 10.08 | 8 | |
| 3 | Zharnel Hughes (R) | Great Britain | 10.13 | 6 | |
| 4 | Ackeem Blake (C) | Jamaica | 10.13 | 5 | |
| 5 | Courtney Lindsey (C) | United States | 10.25 | 4 | |
| 6 | Terrence Jones (C) | Bahamas | 10.26 | 3 | |
| 7 | Fred Kerley (R) | United States | 10.30 | 2 | |
| 8 | Joseph Fahnbulleh (C) | Liberia | 10.39 | 1 | |
| | | | Wind: (−1.3 m/s) | | |

The 200 metres race was held on 5 April, starting at 20:07 (UTC−5).

200 Metres
| Place | Athlete | Nation | Time | Points | Notes |
|---|---|---|---|---|---|
| 1 | Kenny Bednarek (R) | United States | 20.07 | 12 | CR |
| 2 | Zharnel Hughes (R) | Great Britain | 20.37 | 8 | SB |
| 3 | Fred Kerley (R) | United States | 20.39 | 6 | SB |
| 4 | Joseph Fahnbulleh (C) | Liberia | 20.42 | 5 | |
| 5 | Oblique Seville (R) | Jamaica | 20.43 | 4 | |
| 6 | Courtney Lindsey (C) | United States | 20.62 | 3 | |
| 7 | Ackeem Blake (C) | Jamaica | 20.68 | 2 | |
| 8 | Terrence Jones (C) | Bahamas | 20.79 | 1 | |
| | | | Wind: (+0.2 m/s) | | |

Race group summary
| Place | Athlete | Nation | Points | Prize |
|---|---|---|---|---|
| 1st place, gold medalist(s) | Kenny Bednarek (R) | United States | 24 | $100,000.00 |
| 2nd place, silver medalist(s) | Zharnel Hughes (R) | Great Britain | 14 | $50,000.00 |
| 3rd place, bronze medalist(s) | Oblique Seville (R) | Jamaica | 12 | $30,000.00 |
| 4 | Fred Kerley (R) | United States | 8 | $25,000.00 |
| 5 | Ackeem Blake (C) | Jamaica | 7 | $20,000.00 |
| 6 | Courtney Lindsey (C) | United States | 7 | $15,000.00 |
| 7 | Joseph Fahnbulleh (C) | Liberia | 6 | $12,500.00 |
| 8 | Terrence Jones (C) | Bahamas | 4 | $10,000.00 |

=== Short hurdles ===
The 110mH race was held on 5 April, starting at 18:42 (UTC−5).

110 Metres hurdles
| Place | Athlete | Nation | Time | Points | Notes |
|---|---|---|---|---|---|
| 1 | Dylan Beard (C) | United States | 13.29 | 12 | CR |
| 2 | Sasha Zhoya (R) | France | 13.34 | 8 | |
| 3 | Freddie Crittenden (R) | United States | 13.35 | 6 | |
| 4 | Daniel Roberts (R) | United States | 13.36 | 5 | |
| 5 | Cordell Tinch (C) | United States | 13.38 | 4 | |
| 6 | Omar McLeod (C) | Jamaica | 13.38 | 3 | |
| 7 | Eric Edwards (C) | United States | 13.42 | 2 | |
| 8 | Orlando Bennett (C) | Jamaica | 13.61 | 1 | |
| | | | Wind: (−0.5 m/s) | | |

The 100 metres race was held on 6 April, starting at 16:29 (UTC−5).

100 Metres
| Place | Athlete | Nation | Time | Points | Notes |
|---|---|---|---|---|---|
| 1 | Sasha Zhoya (R) | France | 10.55 | 12 | |
| 2 | Cordell Tinch (C) | United States | 10.65 | 8 | PB |
| 3 | Dylan Beard (C) | United States | 10.67 | 6 | |
| 4 | Eric Edwards (C) | United States | 10.68 | 5 | SB |
| 5 | Daniel Roberts (R) | United States | 10.70 | 4 | |
| 6 | Omar McLeod (C) | Jamaica | 10.73 | 3 | |
| 7 | Orlando Bennett (C) | Jamaica | 10.77 | 2 | |
| 8 | Freddie Crittenden (R) | United States | 10.97 | 1 | |
| | | | Wind: (−2.0 m/s) | | |

Race group summary
| Place | Athlete | Nation | Points | Prize |
|---|---|---|---|---|
| 1st place, gold medalist(s) | Sasha Zhoya (R) | France | 20 | $100,000.00 |
| 2nd place, silver medalist(s) | Dylan Beard (C) | United States | 18 | $50,000.00 |
| 3rd place, bronze medalist(s) | Cordell Tinch (C) | United States | 12 | $30,000.00 |
| 4 | Daniel Roberts (R) | United States | 9 | $25,000.00 |
| 5 | Freddie Crittenden (R) | United States | 7 | $20,000.00 |
| 6 | Eric Edwards (C) | United States | 7 | $15,000.00 |
| 7 | Omar McLeod (C) | Jamaica | 6 | $12,500.00 |
| 8 | Orlando Bennett (C) | Jamaica | 3 | $10,000.00 |

=== Long sprints ===
The 200 metres race was held on 5 April, starting at 18:56 (UTC−5).

200 Metres
| Place | Athlete | Nation | Time | Points | Notes |
|---|---|---|---|---|---|
| 1 | Matthew Hudson-Smith (R) | Great Britain | 20.77 | 12 | |
| 2 | Jereem Richards (R) | Trinidad and Tobago | 20.81 | 8 | |
| 3 | Deandre Watkin (C) | Jamaica | 20.91 | 6 | |
| 4 | Vernon Norwood (C) | United States | 20.92 | 5 | |
| 5 | Christopher Bailey (C) | United States | 20.93 | 4 | |
| 6 | Busang Kebinatshipi (C) | Botswana | 21.08 | 3 | |
| 7 | Muzala Samukonga (R) | Zambia | 21.24 | 2 | |
| 8 | Zandrion Barnes (C) | Jamaica | 21.59 | 1 | |
| | | | Wind: (−3.3 m/s) | | |

The 400 metres race was held on 4 April, starting at 18:54 (UTC−5).

400 Metres
| Place | Athlete | Nation | Time | Points | Notes |
|---|---|---|---|---|---|
| 1 | Christopher Bailey (C) | United States | 44.34 | 12 | CR, WL |
| 2 | Matthew Hudson-Smith (R) | Great Britain | 44.65 | 8 | |
| 3 | Vernon Norwood (C) | United States | 44.70 | 6 | SB |
| 4 | Busang Kebinatshipi (C) | Botswana | 45.15 | 5 | |
| 5 | Muzala Samukonga (R) | Zambia | 45.27 | 4 | |
| 6 | Jereem Richards (R) | Trinidad and Tobago | 45.35 | 3 | SB |
| 7 | Deandre Watkin (C) | Jamaica | 45.45 | 2 | SB |
| — | Zandrion Barnes (C) | Jamaica | DQ | — | |

Race group summary
| Place | Athlete | Nation | Points | Prize |
|---|---|---|---|---|
| 1st place, gold medalist(s) | Matthew Hudson-Smith (R) | Great Britain | 20 | $100,000.00 |
| 2nd place, silver medalist(s) | Christopher Bailey (C) | United States | 16 | $50,000.00 |
| 3rd place, bronze medalist(s) | Vernon Norwood (C) | United States | 11 | $30,000.00 |
| 4 | Jereem Richards (R) | Trinidad and Tobago | 11 | $25,000.00 |
| 5 | Busang Kebinatshipi (C) | Botswana | 8 | $20,000.00 |
| 6 | Deandre Watkin (C) | Jamaica | 8 | $15,000.00 |
| 7 | Muzala Samukonga (R) | Zambia | 6 | $12,500.00 |
| 8 | Zandrion Barnes (C) | Jamaica | 1 | $10,000.00 |

=== Long hurdles ===
The 400mH race was held on 4 April, starting at 19:34 (UTC−5).

400 Metres hurdles
| Place | Athlete | Nation | Time | Points | Notes |
|---|---|---|---|---|---|
| 1 | Alison dos Santos (R) | Brazil | 47.61 | 12 | CR, WL |
| 2 | Roshawn Clarke (R) | Jamaica | 48.20 | 8 | |
| 3 | Caleb Dean (R) | United States | 48.58 | 6 | |
| 4 | Malik James-King (C) | Jamaica | 48.69 | 5 | |
| 5 | CJ Allen (C) | United States | 48.71 | 4 | |
| 6 | Chris Robinson (C) | United States | 49.21 | 3 | |
| 7 | Assinie Wilson (C) | Jamaica | 53.24 | 2 | |
| — | Clement Ducos (R) | France | DQ | — | |

The 400 metres race was held on 6 April, starting at 15:54 (UTC−5).

400 Metres
| Place | Athlete | Nation | Time | Points | Notes |
|---|---|---|---|---|---|
| 1 | Alison dos Santos (R) | Brazil | 45.52 | 12 | |
| 2 | Chris Robinson (C) | United States | 45.54 | 8 | PB |
| 3 | Caleb Dean (R) | United States | 45.68 | 6 | |
| 4 | Roshawn Clarke (R) | Jamaica | 45.73 | 5 | |
| 5 | Malik James-King (C) | Jamaica | 46.57 | 4 | |
| 6 | Assinie Wilson (C) | Jamaica | 46.70 | 3 | |
| 7 | CJ Allen (C) | United States | 46.95 | 2 | |
| — | Clement Ducos (R) | France | DNS | — | |

Race group summary
| Place | Athlete | Nation | Points | Prize |
|---|---|---|---|---|
| 1st place, gold medalist(s) | Alison dos Santos (R) | Brazil | 24 | $100,000.00 |
| 2nd place, silver medalist(s) | Roshawn Clarke (R) | Jamaica | 13 | $50,000.00 |
| 3rd place, bronze medalist(s) | Caleb Dean (R) | United States | 12 | $30,000.00 |
| 4 | Chris Robinson (C) | United States | 11 | $25,000.00 |
| 5 | Malik James-King (C) | Jamaica | 9 | $20,000.00 |
| 6 | CJ Allen (C) | United States | 6 | $15,000.00 |
| 7 | Assinie Wilson (C) | Jamaica | 5 | $12,500.00 |
| — | Clement Ducos (R) | France | — | — |

=== Short distance ===
The 800 metres race was held on 6 April, starting at 15:39 (UTC−5).

800 Metres
| Place | Athlete | Nation | Time | Points | Notes |
|---|---|---|---|---|---|
| 1 | Marco Arop (R) | Canada | 1:45.13 | 12 | CR |
| 2 | Emmanuel Wanyonyi (C) | Kenya | 1:46.44 | 8 | |
| 3 | Bryce Hoppel (C) | United States | 1:47.02 | 6 | |
| 4 | Neil Gourley (C) | Great Britain | 1:47.84 | 5 | |
| 5 | Cole Hocker (R) | United States | 1:48.02 | 4 | |
| 6 | Yared Nuguse (R) | United States | 1:48.16 | 3 | |
| 7 | Mohamed Attaoui (C) | Spain | 1:48.44 | 2 | |
| 8 | Josh Kerr (R) | Great Britain | 1:50.68 | 1 | |

The 1500 metres race was held on 5 April, starting at 18:50 (UTC−5).

1500 Metres
| Place | Athlete | Nation | Time | Points | Notes |
|---|---|---|---|---|---|
| 1 | Emmanuel Wanyonyi (C) | Kenya | 3:35.18 | 12 | CR, PB |
| 2 | Yared Nuguse (R) | United States | 3:35.36 | 8 | |
| 3 | Cole Hocker (R) | United States | 3:35.52 | 6 | |
| 4 | Neil Gourley (C) | Great Britain | 3:35.60 | 5 | |
| 5 | Josh Kerr (R) | Great Britain | 3:35.61 | 4 | |
| 6 | Marco Arop (R) | Canada | 3:39.65 | 3 | |
| 7 | Bryce Hoppel (C) | United States | 3:39.78 | 2 | PB |
| 8 | Mohamed Attaoui (C) | Spain | 3:39.78 | 1 | |

Race group summary
| Place | Athlete | Nation | Points | Prize |
|---|---|---|---|---|
| 1st place, gold medalist(s) | Emmanuel Wanyonyi (C) | Kenya | 20 | $100,000.00 |
| 2nd place, silver medalist(s) | Marco Arop (R) | Canada | 15 | $50,000.00 |
| 3rd place, bronze medalist(s) | Yared Nuguse (R) | United States | 11 | $30,000.00 |
| 4 | Cole Hocker (R) | United States | 10 | $25,000.00 |
| 5 | Neil Gourley (C) | Great Britain | 10 | $20,000.00 |
| 6 | Bryce Hoppel (C) | United States | 8 | $15,000.00 |
| 7 | Josh Kerr (R) | Great Britain | 5 | $12,500.00 |
| 8 | Mohamed Attaoui (C) | Spain | 3 | $10,000.00 |

=== Long distance ===
The 3000 metres race was held on 6 April, starting at 16:49 (UTC−5).

3000 Metres
| Place | Athlete | Nation | Time | Points | Notes |
|---|---|---|---|---|---|
| 1 | Hagos Gebrhiwet (R) | Ethiopia | 7:51.55 | 12 | CR |
| 2 | Telahun Haile Bekele (C) | Ethiopia | 8:00.68 | 8 | |
| 3 | Grant Fisher (R) | United States | 8:03.85 | 6 | |
| 4 | Ronald Kwemoi (R) | Kenya | 8:04.12 | 5 | |
| 5 | Cooper Teare (C) | United States | 8:04.16 | 4 | |
| 6 | Dylan Jacobs (C) | United States | 8:04.86 | 3 | |
| 7 | Thierry Ndikumwenayo (C) | Spain | 8:08.52 | 2 | |
| 8 | Charles Philibert-Thiboutot (C) | Canada | 8:09.46 | 1 | |

The 5000 metres race was held on 4 April, starting at 19:56 (UTC−5).

5000 Metres
| Place | Athlete | Nation | Time | Points | Notes |
|---|---|---|---|---|---|
| 1 | Grant Fisher (R) | United States | 14:39.14 | 12 | CR |
| 2 | Cooper Teare (C) | United States | 14:39.31 | 8 | |
| 3 | Dylan Jacobs (C) | United States | 14:39.56 | 6 | |
| 4 | Hagos Gebrhiwet (R) | Ethiopia | 14:40.20 | 5 | |
| 5 | Ronald Kwemoi (R) | Kenya | 14:40.64 | 4 | |
| 6 | Thierry Ndikumwenayo (C) | Spain | 14:41.23 | 3 | |
| 7 | Telahun Haile Bekele (C) | Ethiopia | 14:42.20 | 2 | |
| 8 | Charles Philibert-Thiboutot (C) | Canada | 14:44.30 | 1 | |

Race group summary
| Place | Athlete | Nation | Points | Prize |
|---|---|---|---|---|
| 1st place, gold medalist(s) | Grant Fisher (R) | United States | 18 | $100,000.00 |
| 2nd place, silver medalist(s) | Hagos Gebrhiwet (R) | Ethiopia | 17 | $50,000.00 |
| 3rd place, bronze medalist(s) | Cooper Teare (C) | United States | 12 | $30,000.00 |
| 4 | Telahun Haile Bekele (C) | Ethiopia | 10 | $25,000.00 |
| 5 | Dylan Jacobs (C) | United States | 9 | $20,000.00 |
| 6 | Ronald Kwemoi (R) | Kenya | 9 | $15,000.00 |
| 7 | Thierry Ndikumwenayo (C) | Spain | 5 | $12,500.00 |
| 8 | Charles Philibert-Thiboutot (C) | Canada | 2 | $10,000.00 |

== Women's results ==
=== Short sprints ===
The 100 metres race was held on 5 April, starting at 19:38 (UTC−5).

100 Metres
| Place | Athlete | Nation | Time | Points | Notes |
|---|---|---|---|---|---|
| 1 | Melissa Jefferson-Wooden (R) | United States | 11.11 | 12 | CR |
| 2 | Jenna Prandini (C) | United States | 11.23 | 8 | |
| 3 | Jacious Sears (C) | United States | 11.25 | 6 | |
| 4 | Daryll Neita (R) | Great Britain | 11.33 | 5 | |
| 5 | Kemba Nelson (C) | Jamaica | 11.37 | 4 | |
| 6 | Alana Reid (C) | Jamaica | 11.47 | 3 | |
| 7 | Tamara Clark (C) | United States | 11.58 | 2 | |
| 8 | Jodean Williams (C) | Jamaica | 11.68 | 1 | |
| | | | Wind: (−0.6 m/s) | | |

The 200 metres race was held on 6 April, starting at 17:08 (UTC−5).

200 Metres
| Place | Athlete | Nation | Time | Points | Notes |
|---|---|---|---|---|---|
| 1 | Melissa Jefferson-Wooden (R) | United States | 23.46 | 12 | CR |
| 2 | Jenna Prandini (C) | United States | 23.56 | 8 | |
| 3 | Jacious Sears (C) | United States | 23.79 | 6 | |
| 4 | Kemba Nelson (C) | Jamaica | 23.84 | 5 | |
| 5 | Daryll Neita (R) | Great Britain | 23.89 | 4 | |
| 6 | Alana Reid (C) | Jamaica | 24.02 | 3 | |
| 7 | Jodean Williams (C) | Jamaica | 24.29 | 2 | |
| — | Tamara Clark (C) | United States | DNS | — | |
| | | | Wind: (−4.7 m/s) | | |

Race group summary
| Place | Athlete | Nation | Points | Prize |
|---|---|---|---|---|
| 1st place, gold medalist(s) | Melissa Jefferson-Wooden (R) | United States | 24 | $100,000.00 |
| 2nd place, silver medalist(s) | Jenna Prandini (C) | United States | 16 | $50,000.00 |
| 3rd place, bronze medalist(s) | Jacious Sears (C) | United States | 12 | $30,000.00 |
| 4 | Kemba Nelson (C) | Jamaica | 9 | $25,000.00 |
| 5 | Daryll Neita (R) | Great Britain | 9 | $20,000.00 |
| 6 | Alana Reid (C) | Jamaica | 6 | $15,000.00 |
| 7 | Jodean Williams (C) | Jamaica | 3 | $12,500.00 |
| 8 | Tamara Clark (C) | United States | 2 | $10,000.00 |

=== Short hurdles ===
The 100mH race was held on 5 April, starting at 19:25 (UTC−5).

100 Metres hurdles
| Place | Athlete | Nation | Time | Points | Notes |
|---|---|---|---|---|---|
| 1 | Tia Jones (C) | United States | 12.63 | 12 | CR, WL |
| 2 | Danielle Williams (C) | Jamaica | 12.70 | 8 | |
| 3 | Jasmine Camacho-Quinn (R) | Puerto Rico | 12.70 | 6 | |
| 4 | Ackera Nugent (R) | Jamaica | 12.75 | 5 | |
| 5 | Masai Russell (R) | United States | 12.78 | 4 | |
| 6 | Denisha Cartwright (C) | Bahamas | 12.96 | 3 | |
| 7 | Amber Hughes (C) | United States | 13.39 | 2 | |
| | | | Wind: (−1.4 m/s) | | |

The 100 metres race was held on 6 April, starting at 15:42 (UTC−5).

100 Metres
| Place | Athlete | Nation | Time | Points | Notes |
|---|---|---|---|---|---|
| 1 | Danielle Williams (C) | Jamaica | 11.54 | 12 | |
| 2 | Ackera Nugent (R) | Jamaica | 11.57 | 8 | |
| 3 | Jasmine Camacho-Quinn (R) | Puerto Rico | 11.73 | 6 | |
| 4 | Denisha Cartwright (C) | Bahamas | 11.74 | 5 | |
| 5 | Masai Russell (R) | United States | 11.86 | 4 | |
| 6 | Tia Jones (C) | United States | 12.26 | 3 | |
| 7 | Amber Hughes (C) | United States | 12.32 | 2 | |
| | | | Wind: (−3.4 m/s) | | |

Race group summary
| Place | Athlete | Nation | Points | Prize |
|---|---|---|---|---|
| 1st place, gold medalist(s) | Danielle Williams (C) | Jamaica | 20 | $100,000.00 |
| 2nd place, silver medalist(s) | Tia Jones (C) | United States | 15 | $50,000.00 |
| 3rd place, bronze medalist(s) | Ackera Nugent (R) | Jamaica | 13 | $30,000.00 |
| 4 | Jasmine Camacho-Quinn (R) | Puerto Rico | 12 | $25,000.00 |
| 5 | Denisha Cartwright (C) | Bahamas | 8 | $20,000.00 |
| 6 | Masai Russell (R) | United States | 8 | $15,000.00 |
| 7 | Amber Hughes (C) | United States | 4 | $12,500.00 |

=== Long sprints ===
The 200 metres race was held on 4 April, starting at 18:42 (UTC−5).

Gabby Thomas, who originally signed on for the short sprints category, moved to the long sprints category for the Kingston Slam.

200 Metres
| Place | Athlete | Nation | Time | Points | Notes |
|---|---|---|---|---|---|
| 1 | Gabrielle Thomas (R) | United States | 22.62 | 12 | CR |
| 2 | Marileidy Paulino (R) | Dominican Republic | 22.93 | 8 | |
| 3 | Dina Asher-Smith (C) | Great Britain | 22.96 | 6 | |
| 4 | Salwa Eid Naser (R) | Bahrain | 22.99 | 5 | |
| 5 | Talitha Diggs (C) | United States | 23.30 | 4 | |
| 6 | Alexis Holmes (R) | United States | 23.33 | 3 | |
| 7 | Stacey Ann Williams (C) | Jamaica | 23.35 | 2 | |
| 8 | Nickisha Pryce (R) | Jamaica | 23.75 | 1 | |
| | | | Wind: (−0.2 m/s) | | |

The 400 metres race was held on 5 April, starting at 20:21 (UTC−5).

400 Metres
| Place | Athlete | Nation | Time | Points | Notes |
|---|---|---|---|---|---|
| 1 | Salwa Eid Naser (R) | Bahrain | 48.67 | 12 | CR, SB |
| 2 | Gabrielle Thomas (R) | United States | 49.14 | 8 | PB |
| 3 | Marileidy Paulino (R) | Dominican Republic | 49.35 | 6 | |
| 4 | Alexis Holmes (R) | United States | 50.12 | 5 | SB |
| 5 | Stacey Ann Williams (C) | Jamaica | 50.37 | 4 | SB |
| 6 | Nickisha Pryce (R) | Jamaica | 50.92 | 3 | SB |
| 7 | Talitha Diggs (C) | United States | 52.05 | 2 | |
| 8 | Dina Asher-Smith (C) | Great Britain | 52.15 | 1 | PB |

Race group summary
| Place | Athlete | Nation | Points | Prize |
|---|---|---|---|---|
| 1st place, gold medalist(s) | Gabrielle Thomas (R) | United States | 20 | $100,000.00 |
| 2nd place, silver medalist(s) | Salwa Eid Naser (R) | Bahrain | 17 | $50,000.00 |
| 3rd place, bronze medalist(s) | Marileidy Paulino (R) | Dominican Republic | 14 | $30,000.00 |
| 4 | Alexis Holmes (R) | United States | 8 | $25,000.00 |
| 5 | Dina Asher-Smith (C) | Great Britain | 7 | $20,000.00 |
| 6 | Stacey Ann Williams (C) | Jamaica | 6 | $15,000.00 |
| 7 | Talitha Diggs (C) | United States | 6 | $12,500.00 |
| 8 | Nickisha Pryce (R) | Jamaica | 4 | $10,000.00 |

=== Long hurdles ===
The 400mH race was held on 4 April, starting at 19:46 (UTC−5).

400 Metres hurdles
| Place | Athlete | Nation | Time | Points | Notes |
|---|---|---|---|---|---|
| 1 | Sydney McLaughlin-Levrone (R) | United States | 52.76 | 12 | CR, WL |
| 2 | Dalilah Muhammad (C) | United States | 54.59 | 8 | |
| 3 | Rushell Clayton (R) | Jamaica | 55.02 | 6 | |
| 4 | Andrenette Knight (C) | Jamaica | 55.06 | 5 | |
| 5 | Cathelijn Peeters (C) | Netherlands | 55.85 | 4 | |
| 6 | Shiann Salmon (C) | Jamaica | 55.89 | 3 | |
| 7 | Cassandra Tate (C) | United States | 56.65 | 2 | |

The 400 metres race was held on 6 April, starting at 17:21 (UTC−5).

400 Metres
| Place | Athlete | Nation | Time | Points | Notes |
|---|---|---|---|---|---|
| 1 | Sydney McLaughlin-Levrone (R) | United States | 50.32 | 12 | |
| 2 | Andrenette Knight (C) | Jamaica | 52.09 | 8 | SB |
| 3 | Dalilah Muhammad (C) | United States | 52.21 | 6 | SB |
| 4 | Shiann Salmon (C) | Jamaica | 52.25 | 5 | |
| 5 | Cathelijn Peeters (C) | Netherlands | 52.52 | 4 | |
| 6 | Cassandra Tate (C) | United States | 52.73 | 3 | |
| — | Rushell Clayton (R) | Jamaica | DNF | — | |

Race group summary
| Place | Athlete | Nation | Points | Prize |
|---|---|---|---|---|
| 1st place, gold medalist(s) | Sydney McLaughlin-Levrone (R) | United States | 24 | $100,000.00 |
| 2nd place, silver medalist(s) | Dalilah Muhammad (C) | United States | 14 | $50,000.00 |
| 3rd place, bronze medalist(s) | Andrenette Knight (C) | Jamaica | 13 | $30,000.00 |
| 4 | Shiann Salmon (C) | Jamaica | 8 | $25,000.00 |
| 5 | Cathelijn Peeters (C) | Netherlands | 8 | $20,000.00 |
| 6 | Rushell Clayton (R) | Jamaica | 6 | $15,000.00 |
| 7 | Cassandra Tate (C) | United States | 5 | $12,500.00 |

=== Short distance ===
The 800 metres race was held on 4 April, starting at 19:21 (UTC−5).

800 Metres
| Place | Athlete | Nation | Time | Points | Notes |
|---|---|---|---|---|---|
| 1 | Nikki Hiltz (R) | United States | 1:58.23 | 12 | CR, WL, PB |
| 2 | Diribe Welteji (R) | Ethiopia | 1:58.29 | 8 | |
| 3 | Jessica Hull (R) | Australia | 1:58.58 | 6 | PB |
| 4 | Sage Hurta-Klecker (C) | United States | 1:59.26 | 5 | SB |
| 5 | Susan Ejore (C) | Kenya | 1:59.26 | 4 | |
| 6 | Natoya Goule-Toppin (C) | Jamaica | 1:59.78 | 3 | SB |
| 7 | Heather Maclean (C) | United States | 2:00.71 | 2 | |
| 8 | Mary Moraa (R) | Kenya | 2:00.97 | 1 | |

The 1500 metres race was held on 5 April, starting at 19:08 (UTC−5).

1500 Metres
| Place | Athlete | Nation | Time | Points | Notes |
|---|---|---|---|---|---|
| 1 | Diribe Welteji (R) | Ethiopia | 4:04.51 | 12 | CR |
| 2 | Susan Ejore (C) | Kenya | 4:05.10 | 8 | |
| 3 | Nikki Hiltz (R) | United States | 4:05.39 | 6 | SB |
| 4 | Jessica Hull (R) | Australia | 4:05.48 | 5 | |
| 5 | Heather Maclean (C) | United States | 4:07.11 | 4 | |
| 6 | Sage Hurta-Klecker (C) | United States | 4:10.16 | 3 | SB |
| 7 | Natoya Goule-Toppin (C) | Jamaica | 4:20.73 | 2 | |
| — | Mary Moraa (R) | Kenya | DNS | — | |

Race group summary
| Place | Athlete | Nation | Points | Prize |
|---|---|---|---|---|
| 1st place, gold medalist(s) | Diribe Welteji (R) | Ethiopia | 20 | $100,000.00 |
| 2nd place, silver medalist(s) | Nikki Hiltz (R) | United States | 18 | $50,000.00 |
| 3rd place, bronze medalist(s) | Susan Ejore (C) | Kenya | 12 | $30,000.00 |
| 4 | Jessica Hull (R) | Australia | 11 | $25,000.00 |
| 5 | Sage Hurta-Klecker (C) | United States | 8 | $20,000.00 |
| 6 | Heather Maclean (C) | United States | 6 | $15,000.00 |
| 7 | Natoya Goule-Toppin (C) | Jamaica | 5 | $12,500.00 |
| 8 | Mary Moraa (R) | Kenya | 1 | $10,000.00 |

=== Long distance ===
The 3000 metres race was held on 4 April, starting at 19:04 (UTC−5).

3000 Metres
| Place | Athlete | Nation | Time | Points | Notes |
|---|---|---|---|---|---|
| 1 | Ejgayehu Taye (C) | Ethiopia | 8:28.42 | 12 | CR |
| 2 | Agnes Jebet Ngetich (R) | Kenya | 8:28.75 | 8 | PB |
| 3 | Tsigie Gebreselama (R) | Ethiopia | 8:38.15 | 6 | |
| 4 | Hellen Ekalale Lobun (C) | Kenya | 8:42.51 | 5 | |
| 5 | Whittni Morgan (C) | United States | 8:43.35 | 4 | |
| 6 | Elise Cranny (R) | United States | 8:44.03 | 3 | |
| 7 | Nozomi Tanaka (R) | Japan | 8:49.10 | 2 | |
| 8 | Emily Infeld (C) | United States | 8:56.66 | 1 | |

The 5000 metres was held on 6 April, starting at 16:04 (UTC−5).

5000 Metres
| Place | Athlete | Nation | Time | Points | Notes |
|---|---|---|---|---|---|
| 1 | Ejgayehu Taye (C) | Ethiopia | 14:54.88 | 12 | CR |
| 2 | Agnes Jebet Ngetich (R) | Kenya | 14:59.80 | 8 | |
| 3 | Tsigie Gebreselama (R) | Ethiopia | 15:24.62 | 6 | |
| 4 | Emily Infeld (C) | United States | 15:26.87 | 5 | |
| 5 | Hellen Ekalale Lobun (C) | Kenya | 15:28.70 | 4 | |
| 6 | Elise Cranny (R) | United States | 15:31.61 | 3 | |
| 7 | Nozomi Tanaka (R) | Japan | 15:31.93 | 2 | |
| 8 | Whittni Morgan (C) | United States | 15:36.31 | 1 | |

Race group summary
| Place | Athlete | Nation | Points | Prize |
|---|---|---|---|---|
| 1st place, gold medalist(s) | Ejgayehu Taye (C) | Ethiopia | 24 | $100,000.00 |
| 2nd place, silver medalist(s) | Agnes Jebet Ngetich (R) | Kenya | 16 | $50,000.00 |
| 3rd place, bronze medalist(s) | Tsigie Gebreselama (R) | Ethiopia | 12 | $30,000.00 |
| 4 | Hellen Ekalale Lobun (C) | Kenya | 9 | $25,000.00 |
| 5 | Emily Infeld (C) | United States | 6 | $20,000.00 |
| 6 | Elise Cranny (R) | United States | 6 | $15,000.00 |
| 7 | Whittni Morgan (C) | United States | 5 | $12,500.00 |
| 8 | Nozomi Tanaka (R) | Japan | 4 | $10,000.00 |

=== Broadcast ===
In February 2025, Grand Slam Track announced agreements with The CW, an over-the-air network, and the streaming service Peacock in the United States. All events streamed on Peacock while The CW aired weekend coverage. NBC, whose parent company owns Peacock, also aired a highlight special.

== See also ==
- 2025 Grand Slam Track season
- 2025 Diamond League
