= Saara Keskitalo =

Finnish hurdler (born 2000)

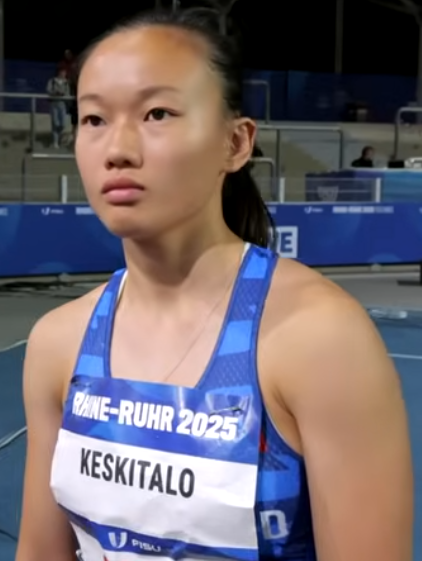
- At the 2025 Summer World University Games

Personal information
- Born: 3 July 2000 (age 26) China

Sport
- Sport: Athletics
- Event: Hurdles

Achievements and titles
- Personal bests: 60m hurdles: 8.02 s (2026); 100m hurdles: 12.64 s (2026)
Medal record
Women's athletics
Representing Finland
Summer World University Games
Gold medal – first place	2025 Bochum	100m hurdles

Saara Keskitalo (born 3 July 2000) is a Finnish hurdler. She was Finnish 60 metres hurdles champion in 2025 and 2025 Summer World University Games champion over 100 metres hurdles.

== Biography ==
She reached the semi-finals of the women's 100 metres hurdles at the 2018 World Athletics U20 Championships in Tampere, Finland.

Competing at the delayed 2021 University Games in Chengdu, China in August 2023, Keskitalo set a personal best of 13.17 in the semifinals before placing sixth overall in the final with a time of 13.32 seconds.

In 2024, Keskitalo finished third in the 100 metres hurdles at the Kaleva Games. The following month, she broke 13 seconds for the first time for the 100 metres hurdles and moved to fifth on the Finnish all-time list with a time of 12.84 in Joensuu.

In January 2025, she improved her personal best for the 60 metres hurdles from 8.22 seconds to 8.11 and then 8.03 seconds. She won the Finnish Indoor Athletics Championships over 60 metres hurdles in February 2025. She subsequently competed for Finland at the 2025 European Athletics Indoor Championships in Apeldoorn, Netherlands.

She won the gold medal in the 100 metres hurdles at the 2025 World University Games in Germany, winning with a time of 12.88 seconds. She was a semi-finalist at the 2025 World Athletics Championships in Tokyo, Japan.

Competing at the Meeting de l’Eure in Val-de-Reuil, a World Athletics Indoor Tour Silver meeting on 1 February 2026, Keskitalo ran a personal best of 7.95 seconds for the 60 metres hurdles, winning ahead of Laeticia Bapte and Alaysha Johnson. On 1 March 2026, she was a narrow second to Lotta Harala in the 60 metres hurdles, running 8.01 seconds at the Finish Indoor Championships in Espoo. She also placed second in 7.36 seconds to Lotta Kemppinen in the 60 metres dash at the championships. In August 2026, she competed at the 2026 European Athletics Championships in Birmingham, England, in the women's 100 metres hurdles, reaching the semi-finals. She also competed in the women's 4 × 100 metres relay at the championships.

== Personal life ==
Keskitalo was born in China, but was adopted by Finnish parents, Jukka and Marja, at the age of eleven months old. She spent her childhood in Jyväskylä and Helsinki, and has two sisters. In 2020, her parents moved to Oulu, where father serves as a Diocesan bishop but Keskitalo stayed in Helsinki to study at Mäkelänrinne Sports High School. She is a member of Espoo Tapiot and is studying at the University of Helsinki.
