= Denisha Cartwright =

Bahamian athlete

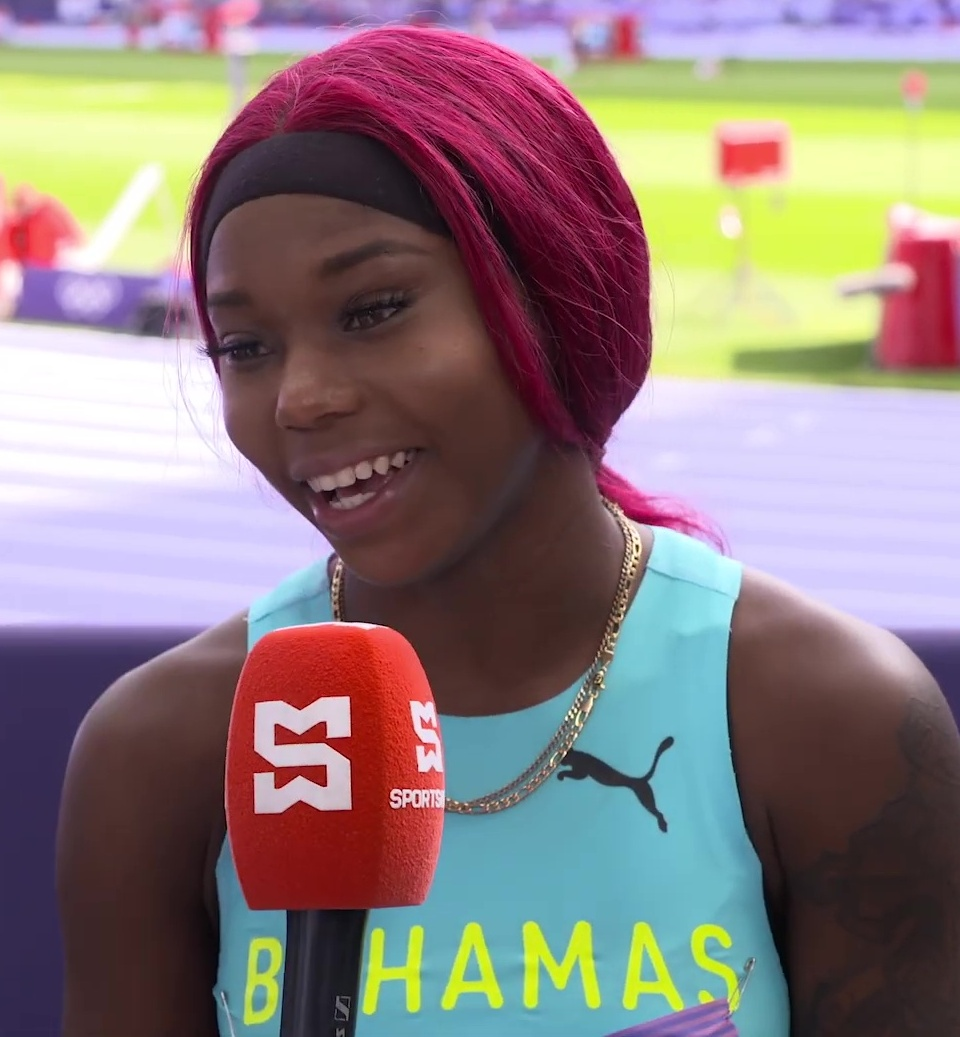

Personal information
- Nationality: Bahamian
- Born: 28 December 1999 (age 26)

Sport
- Sport: Athletics
- Event: Hurdles

Achievements and titles
- Personal bests: 60m: 7.23 (Mankato, 2023); 100m: 11.28 (Austin, 2024); 200m 23.07 (Mankato, 2024); 400m: 53.63 (Mankato, 2023); 60m hurdles: 7.78 (Nanjing, 2025); 100m hurdles: 12.60 (Mankato, 2024)
Medal record
Women's athletics
Representing Bahamas
NACAC U23 Championships
Bronze medal – third place	2021 San José	100 m

Denisha Cartwright (born 28 December 1999) is a Bahamian sprinter and sprint hurdler. She competed in the 100 metre hurdles at the 2024 Olympic Games and 60 metres hurdles at the 2025 World Athletics Indoor Championships.

== Early life ==
Cartwright grew up in the Bahamas. She first competed for the Central State Lady Marauders track and field team before attending Minnesota State University and competing for the Minnesota State Mavericks track and field team.

== Career ==
In 2021, she was a NACAC U23 Championships bronze medallist in San Jose, Costa Rica in the 100 metres. In May 2022, she won the NCAA Division II gold in the women's 100m hurdles, winning in a new personal best time of 13.35 seconds. The following year she retained her title in the women's 100 metre hurdles running 12.94 seconds.

In March 2024, Cartwright was named the Northern Sun Intercollegiate Conference (NSIC) Women's Indoor Track & Field Athlete of the Year for the fourth consecutive year. This came after she won the conference 60 metre hurdles indoor title for the fourth year in a row, running an NCAA record time of 7.93. She also broke the NSIC record in the 200m dash in a time of 23.68 and won the 60m dash with a time of 7.23, tying her own record from 2023.

In April 2024, she won the Texas Relays 100m hurdles. She competed at the NSIC Outdoor Championship in May 2024, and won the 100m, 200m and 100m hurdles. Her winning time of 12.60 seconds in the 100m hurdles broke the NSIC record and met the qualifying standard for the 2024 Olympic Games. She subsequently competed in the 100m hurdles at the 2024 Paris Olympics.

In March 2025, she set a new personal best for the 60 metres hurdles of 7.78 seconds at the 2025 World Athletics Indoor Championships in Nanjing. In April 2025, she competed at the inaugural Grand Slam Track event in Kingston, Jamaica in the Short Hurdles category, placing sixth in the 100 metres hurdles and fifth in the 100 metres dash in 11.74 seconds.

In March 2026, she was a finalist in the 60 metres hurdles at the 2026 World Athletics Indoor Championships in Toruń, Poland.

== Personal life ==
She is the daughter of Bahamian former volleyball national team player and coach Leslie ‘Russia’ Cartwright.

== Statistics ==
Grand Slam Track results
Slam	Race group	Event	Pl.	Time	Prize money
2025 Kingston Slam	Short hurdles	100 m hurdles	6th	12.96	US$20,000
2025 Kingston Slam	Short hurdles	100 m	4th	11.74	US$20,000
