= Mako Fukube =

Japanese athlete

Personal information
- Born: 28 October 1995 (age 30) Hiroshima Prefecture, Japan

Sport
- Sport: Athletics
- Event: 100 m hurdles
Medal record
Women's athletics
Representing Japan
Asian Games
Gold medal – first place	2026 Aichi–Nagoya	110 m hurdles

Mako Fukube (福部 真子, Fukube Mako; born 28 October 1995) is a Japanese athlete who specialises in the sprint hurdles. She represented her country at the 2022 World Championships and at the 2024 Summer Olympics.

Her personal best in the event is 12.69 seconds (+1.2 m/s) set in Hiratsuka in 2024. This is the current national record.

== International competitions ==
Year	Competition	Venue	Position	Event	Notes
Representing Japan
2022	World Championships	Eugene, United States	16th (sf)	100 m hurdles	12.82
2024	Olympic Games	Paris, France	17th (sf)	100 m hurdles	12.89
2025	World Championships	Tokyo, Japan	21st (sf)	100 m hurdles	13.06
2026	World Indoor Championships	Toruń, Poland	22nd (sf)	60 m hurdles	8.06
