= Anna Maria Millend =

Estonian hurdler (born 2004)

Personal information
- Born: 1 April 2004 (age 22)

Sport
- Sport: Athletics
- Event(s): Sprints, Hurdles

Achievements and titles
- Personal best(s): 100 m: 11.78 (Tallinn 2022); 100 mH: 13.16 (Tallinn 2025); 60 mH: 8.28 (Tallinn 2026)
Medal record
Women's athletics
Representing Estonia
World U20 Championships
Silver medal – second place	2021 Nairobi	100 m hurdles

Anna Maria Millend (born 1 April 2004) is an Estonian hurdler. She was a silver medalist at the 2021 World Athletics U20 Championships in the 100 metres hurdles.

== Career ==
Millend is a member of Audentes Sports Club. She competed for Estonia at the 2021 European Athletics U20 Championships in Tallinn in July 2021. The following month, she won the silver medal in the 100 metres hurdles at the 2021 World Athletics U20 Championships in Nairobi, Kenya, running 13.45 seconds to finish runner-up to Ackera Nugent of Jamaica, but ahead of Anna Tóth of Hungary. Millend set both a new personal best, and an Estonian junior record, being timed at 13.56 in the heats before setting a time of 13.44 seconds in the semi-final.

In June 2022, Millend set a new U20 Estonian record of 11.78 seconds in the 100 metres at the Tallinn Youth Summer Championships. In 2023, shortly after her nineteenth birthday, Millend moved to fifth place on the Estonian all-time list, and set a new Estonian under-20 record, with a run of 13.30 for the 100 metres hurdles whilst competing in Finland.

In June 2025, she was part of the Estonian women's 4 x 100 metres relay team which set a new national record whilst competing at the 2025 European Athletics Team Championships Second Division in Maribor, running 43.98 seconds alongside Miia Ott, Kreete Verlin and Ann Marii Kivikas. The following month, Millend set a new 100m hurdles personal best in Joensuu, Finland, running a time of 13.24 seconds. She competed for Estonia at the 2025 European Athletics U23 Championships in Bergen , Norway, and the 2025 Summer World University Games in Bochum, Germany. In August, she lowered her personal best to 13.16 seconds at the 2025 Estonian Championships.
