= Whittni Morgan =

American middle-distance runner and steeplechaser

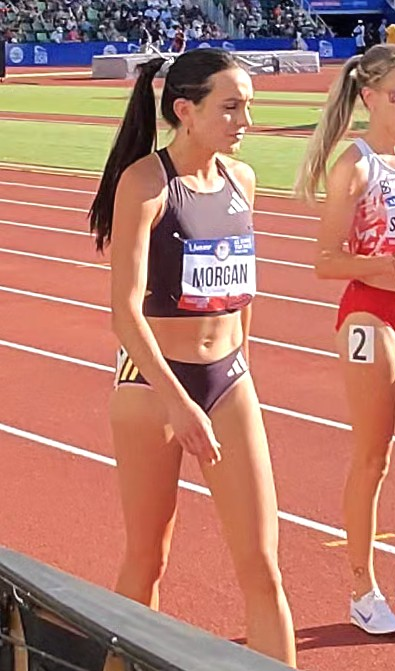
- Morgan at the 2024 United States Olympic trials

Personal information
- Born: Whittni Orton; October 22, 1997 (age 28) Panguitch, Utah, U.S.
- Height: 5 ft 7 in (170 cm)

Sport
- Event(s): 800 m, 1500 m, 3000 m, 5000 m
- College team: BYU Cougars
- Club: Adidas
- Turned pro: 2021
- Coached by: Diljeet Taylor

Achievements and titles
- Personal bests: Outdoor; 800 m: 2:05.97 (Palo Alto, California 2019); 1500 m: 4:04.86 (Portland, OR 2022); Mile: 4:47.16 (Provo, Utah 2018); 3000 m: 8:43.39 (Eugene, OR 2022); 5000 m: 14:53.57 (Paris, France 2024); Indoor; 800 m: 2:07.57 i (New York City 2018); Mile: 4:23.97 i (New York City 2023); 3000 m: 8:28.03i (New York City 2025); 5000 m: 14:48.41 i (Boston 2025)

Whittni Morgan (née Orton; born October 22, 1997) is an American middle distance runner. Originally from Panguitch, Utah, Morgan represents Adidas and debuted at the 2022 Millrose Games 3000 meters. She competed for Team USA in the 5000 m at the 2024 Summer Olympics.

Prior to going pro, Morgan competed for the BYU Cougars. There she earned 10 All-American awards, won the 2021 NCAA Division I Cross Country Championship individual title, and led the school to a 2nd-place team finish ― the highest in school history. In high school, Morgan was Utah's 2016 Female Athlete of the Year, winning four Utah High School Activities Association 1A individual cross country state championships, in addition to three basketball state championships and two volleyball state championships.

== Statistics ==
=== Circuit performances ===
Grand Slam Track results
| Slam | Race group | Event | Pl. | Time | Prize money |
|---|---|---|---|---|---|
| 2025 Kingston Slam | Long distance | 3000 m | 5th | 8:43.35 | US$12,500 |
| 2025 Kingston Slam | Long distance | 5000 m | 8th | 15:36.31 | US$12,500 |

=== International competitions ===
Representing the United States
| Year | Competition | Venue | Position | Event | Time |
|---|---|---|---|---|---|
| 2024 | Olympic Games | Paris, France | 14th | 5000 m | 14:53.57 |
| 2025 | World Indoor Championships | Nanjing, China | 4th | 3000 m | 8:39.18 |
