= Myreanna Bebe =

Haitian hurdler (born 2001)

Personal information
- Nationality: Haitian
- Born: 13 June 2001 (age 25) Orlando, United States

Sport
- Sport: Athletics
- Event: Hurdles

Achievements and titles
- Personal best(s): 60 m hurdles: 7.95 (College Station, 2026); 100 m hurdles: 12.81 (Knoxville, 2025)

Myreanna Bebe (born 13 June 2001) is an American-born, Haitian sprint hurdler. She represented Haiti in the 60 metres hurdles at the 2026 World Athletics Indoor Championships.

== Biography ==
Bebe was born in Orlando, Florida and later moved to Arizona, where she attended Queen Creek High School. She started running cross country in junior high school before later transitioning to hurdles and competing for Arizona Elite Track Club. In 2018, she won the Arizona Meet of Champions 100 metres hurdles title. She attended Louisiana Tech University the following year.

Bebe later transferred to the University of Iowa, and from 2023 the University of Tennessee. She won the 60 metres hurdles at the 2025 Southeastern Conference Indoor Track & Field Championship. She also qualified for the 2026 NCAA Division I Indoor Track and Field Championships where she was a semi-finalist, running 8.11 seconds for the 60m hurdles.

In March 2026, she represented Haiti in the 60 metres hurdles at the 2026 World Athletics Indoor Championships in Toruń, Poland.

== Personal life ==
Her brother Jason Josaphat was killed in 2016 in Orlando at the Pulse nightclub shooting.
