= Ackera Nugent =

Jamaican sprinter (born 2002)

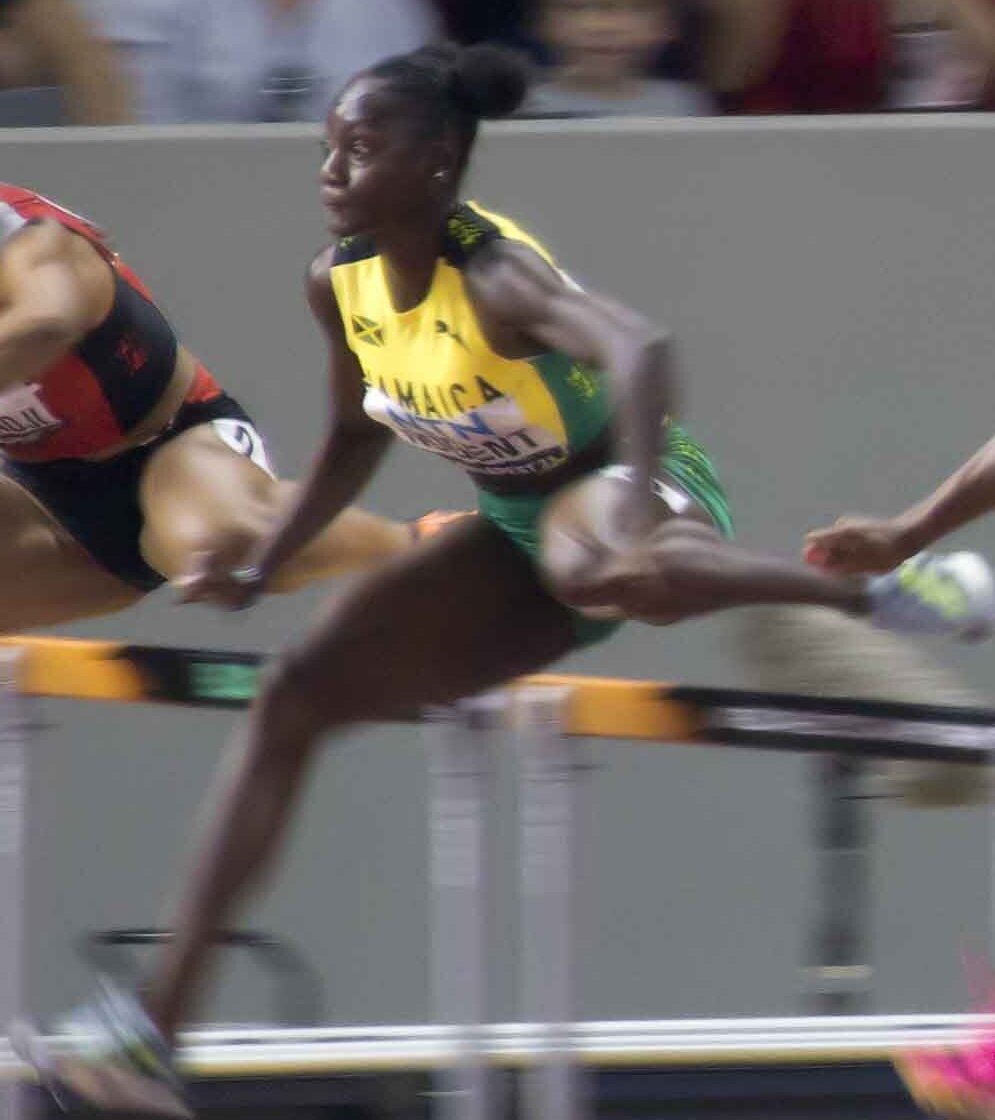
- Nugent at the 2023 World Athletics Championships in the 100 metres hurdles final

Personal information
- Nationality: Jamaica
- Born: 29 April 2002 (age 24) Kingston, Jamaica

Sport
- Sport: Track and field
- Events: Sprints, Hurdles
- College team: Baylor Bears; Arkansas Razorbacks
- Club: Hurdle Mechanic; Racers Track Club; Swept Track Club
- Coached by: Boogie Johnson; Craig Sewell; Okeil Stewart

Achievements and titles
- Personal bests: 60mH: 7.72 NR (Albuquerque 2023); 100 m: 11.09 (Texas 2021); 100 mH: 12.24 NR (Rome 2024); 200 m: 23.10 (Gainesville 2023)
Medal record
Women's athletics
Representing Jamaica
World Indoor Championships
Bronze medal – third place	2025 Nanjing	60 m hurdles
Diamond League
First place	2025 Zurich	100 m hurdles
Third place	2024 Brussels	100 mh
World U20 Championships
Gold medal – first place	2021 Nairobi	100 m hurdles
Summer Youth Olympics
Bronze medal – third place	2018 Buenos Aires	100 m hurdles
Pan American U20 Championships
Silver medal – second place	2019 San Jose	100 m hurdles
NACAC Championships (U23)
Gold medal – first place	2021 San José	100 m hurdles
NACAC Championships (U18)
Silver medal – second place	2019 Queretaro	100 m hurdles
Gold medal – first place	2019 Queretaro	4×100m relay
Carifta Games Junior (U20)
Gold medal – first place	2019 George Town	100 m hurdles
Gold medal – first place	2019 George Town	4×100 meters relay
Carifta Games Youth (U18)
Silver medal – second place	2018 Nassau	100 m hurdles

Ackera Nugent (born 29 April 2002) is a Jamaican athlete who specializes in sprint hurdles. She is the 2021 World Athletics U20 Champion in the 100m hurdles.

== Biography ==
Nugent attended Excelsior High School in Kingston, home of the Eagles. She graduated from the University of Arkansas with a degree in communications and media studies, after transferring from Baylor University.

== Career ==
In 2019, at the ISSA Boys and Girls Championships, she won the class two 100 metres hurdles in 12.91, a Champs record, captured gold and entered the spotlight.

== 2021 ==
In 2021, Nugent set an under-20 60m hurdles world record with a time of 7.91s. She won gold at the NCAA Indoor Championships, and came third in the 100m Hurdles at the NCAA Outdoor Championships, also making the final of the 100 metres, where she came ninth. Nugent won gold in the 100m Hurdles at the World U20 Championships, clocking a time of 12.95s.

== 2022 ==
Nugent ran a big personal best over 100m hurdles in 2022, improving to 12.45s. She qualified for the 2022 NCAA Championships however missed them due to an ankle injury.

== 2023 ==
In 2023, Nugent ran a new Jamaican national record over 60m hurdles, with a time of 7.72s in Albuquerque. She competed at the 2023 World Championships, where she finished fifth in the final.

== 2024 ==
Nugent ran a Jamaican national record over 100m hurdles at the 2024 Jamaican Championships, clocking a time of 12.28s. In July 2024, she was officially selected in the Jamaican team for the 2024 Summer Olympics, where she made it to the final.

In October 2024, it was announced that she had signed up for the inaugural season of the Michael Johnson founded Grand Slam Track.

== 2025 ==
She represented Jamaica at the 2025 World Athletics Indoor Championships in Nanjing, China coming in third for bronze in 7.74s. In addition, she is the Wanda Diamond League season winner in the 100mh.

== 2026 ==
She opened her season at the Camperdown Classics in Kingston running the 400m in a personal best 55.63 to win. At Velocity Fest 18, she finished the Final Two 200 metres 3rd in 23.35 (+1.4). For the Shanghai DL, she ran against a stacked field including Masai Russell and training partner Tobi Amusan recording 12.98 in 6th for her first hurdles race of the season.

== Achievements ==
=== Personal bests ===
Type	Distance	Result	Venue	Date	Notes
Outdoor	100 metres	11.09	College Station, United States	27 May 2021	(Wind: +1.6 m/s)
Outdoor	200 metres	23.10	Gainesville, United States	14 April 2023	(Wind: +1.2 m/s)
Outdoor	400 metres	55.63	Kingston, Jamaica	14 February 2026	
Outdoor	100 metres hurdles	12.24	Rome, Italy	30 August 2024	(Wind: -0.4 m/s), NR
Outdoor	400 metres hurdles	59.80	Kingston, Jamaica	9 March 2019	
Outdoor	Long jump	5.01 m	Kingston, Jamaica	13 June 2015	(Wind: +0.0 m/s)
Indoor	60 metres	7.20	Fayetteville, United States	25 February 2023	
Indoor	50 metres hurdles	6.68+	Liévin, France	26 January 2024	
Indoor	60 metres hurdles	7.72	Albuquerque, United States	10 March 2023	NR
Indoor	200 metres sh	24.13	Lubbock, United States	30 January 2021	
	Team events				
Outdoor	4 x 100 metres relay	42.83	Austin, United States	10 June 2023	
Indoor	4 x 400 metres relay sh	3:39.48	Lubbock, United States	15 January 2022	

=== International competitions ===
Representing Jamaica
Year	Competition	Venue	Position	Event	Result
2018	CARIFTA Games (U18)	Nassau, Bahamas	2nd	100 m hurdles (76.2 cm)	13.35
2018	World U20 Championships	Tampere, Finland	—	4 × 100 m	DQ
2018	Youth Olympic Games	Buenos Aires, Argentina	3rd	100 m hurdles (76.2 cm)	26.41
2019	CARIFTA Games (U20)	George Town, Cayman Islands	1st	100 m hurdles	13.24
2019	CARIFTA Games (U20)	George Town, Cayman Islands	1st	4 × 100 m	44.25
2019	NACAC U18 Championships	Queretaro, Mexico	2nd	100 m hurdles (76.2 cm)	13.50
2019	NACAC U18 Championships	Queretaro, Mexico	1st	4 × 100 m	45.02
2019	Pan American U20 Championships	San José, Costa Rica	2nd	100 m hurdles	13.37
2021	NACAC U20 Championships	San José, Costa Rica	1st	100 m hurdles	13.64
2021	World U20 Championships	Nairobi, Kenya	1st	100 m hurdles	12.95
2023	World Championships	Budapest, Hungary	5th	100 m hurdles	12.61
2024	Olympic Games	Paris, France	—	100 m hurdles	DNF
2025	World Indoor Championships	Nanjing, China	3rd	60 m hurdles	7.74
2025	World Championships	Tokyo, Japan	9th (sf)	100 m hurdles	12.63
2026	World Ultimate Championship	Budapest, Hungary	12th (h)	100 m hurdles	12.81

=== Circuit performances ===
Grand Slam Track results
Slam	Race group	Event	Pl.	Time	Prize money
2025 Kingston Slam	Short hurdles	100 m hurdles	4th	12.75	US$30,000
2025 Kingston Slam	Short hurdles	100 m	2nd	11.57	US$30,000
2025 Miami Slam	Short hurdles	100 m hurdles	3rd	12.34	US$100,000
2025 Miami Slam	Short hurdles	100 m	1st	11.09	US$100,000
2025 Philadelphia Slam	Short hurdles	100 m hurdles	1st	12.44	US$100,000
2025 Philadelphia Slam	Short hurdles	100 m	1st	11.11	US$100,000
