= Marlene Meier =

German hurdler

Personal information
- Nationality: German
- Born: 7 March 2002 (age 24)
- Height: 1.78 m (5 ft 10 in)

Sport
- Sport: Athletics
- Event: Hurdles

Achievements and titles
- Personal best(s): 60 m hurdles: 7.90 (Toruń, 2026); 100 m hurdles: 12.93 (Berlin, 2024)

Marlene Meier (born 7 March 2002) is a German sprint hurdler. She has won German national titles over 100 metres hurdles and 60 metres hurdles.

== Early and personal life ==
From Pulheim, her parents are former athletes Heike Henkel and Paul Meier. She started athletics at TSV Glessen but also participated in gymnastics and ballet as a child. She attended school in Leverkusen before studying Sustainable Design in Cologne.

== Career ==
A TSV Bayer 04 Leverkusen athlete, she showed aptitude for sprint hurdles from an early age, winning German titles at under-15 and under-16 level. In 2020, she won the German U20 national title. She qualified for the 2021 European Athletics U20 Championships in Tallinn, Estonia with a personal best time in the 100 metres hurdles recorded at the Junior Gala in Mannheim, of 13.56 seconds. At the Championships, she reached the semi-finals.

She became German national champion in the 100 metres hurdles for the first time in 2022. That year, she also won the German U23 title in Wattenscheid. In February 2023, she was runner-up at the German Indoor Championships over 60 metres hurdles. In September 2023, she improved her personal best over 100 m hurdles to 13.00. She competed at the 2024 European Athletics Championships in Rome. In July 2024, she ran under 13 seconds for the 100 metres hurdles for the first time.

She ran under 8 seconds for the 60 m hurdles for the first time on 9 February 2025, in Düsseldorf. She became German national indoor champion over 60 metres hurdles in Dortmund in February 2025. She was selected for the 2025 European Athletics Indoor Championships in Appeldoorn, where she qualified for the final, placing sixth overall.

Meier went below eight seconds again the following year and had a victory in the 60 m hurdles at the Erfurt Indoor 2026, a World Athletics Indoor Tour Challenger meeting, beating Rosina Schneider in 7.97 seconds. She then successfully defended her national title at the German Indoor Championships, equalling her personal best to win the 60 metres hurdles final on 28 February 2026. Competing at the 2026 World Athletics Indoor Championships in Poland, Meier became the first German hurdler since Cindy Roleder in 2018 to reach an indoor World Championship final, placing seventh overall and running a personal best 7.90 seconds.
