= Fenna Achterberg =

Dutch sprinter (born 2004)

Personal information
- Born: 12 October 2004 (age 21)

Sport
- Sport: Athletics
- Events: Sprint, Hurdles

Achievements and titles
- Personal bests: 60m: 7.47 (2026); 100m: 11.38 (2026); 60mH: 8.13 (2026); 100mH: 13.20 (2025)

Fenna Achterberg (born 12 October 2004) is a Dutch sprinter and high hurdler.

== Biography ==
From Veenendaal, she nominated for Sports Talent of 2021 Veenendaal having, as a 15-year-old in 2020, placing third in the indoor heptathlon at the Dutch Under-18 National Championships, and placing second in the long jump, the 100 metres hurdles, and the heptathlon, at the Under-18 Outdoor National Athletics Championships, before her progress was hampered by injury.

In February 2025, she won the Dutch under-20 indoor title in the 60 metres hurdles, and placed fourth the following weekend in the 60 metres hurdles at the senior Dutch Indoor Athletics Championships, running 8.20 seconds in the final. She made her senior international debut with the Dutch team at the 2025 World Athletics Relays as part of the mixed 4 × 100 m relay team in Guangzhou, China in May 2025. In August 2025, she placed third with 13.21 seconds at the senior Dutch Athletics Championships in the 100 meters hurdles and later set a new personal best in the 100 metres hurdles, competing in Belgium, with 13.20 seconds.

On 1 March 2026, she placed fourth in the 60 metres hurdles at the Dutch Indoor Championships, running 8.15 seconds in the semi-final and 8.13 in the final. Achterberg competed with the Dutch squad at the 2026 World Athletics Relays in Gaborone, Botswana. On 25 July, she placed second behind Isabel van den Berg at the Dutch Championships in Hengelo over 100 metres with a time of 11.38 seconds. The following day, she placed third in the 100 metres hurdles final behind Nadine Visser and Mira Groot. She competed for the Netherlands at the 2026 European Athletics Championships in both the women's and mixed 4 x 100 metres relays.
