= 2021 Italian Athletics Championships =

Italian athletic competition

- Dates: 23 January (35 & 50 km racewalk); 6 March (20 km racewalk); 2 May (10,000 m); 25–27 June (track & field)
- Host city: Ostia (35 & 50 km racewalk); Grottaglie (20 km racewalk); Molfetta (10,000 m); Rome (half marathon); Reggio Emilia (marathoon); Rovereto (track & field)
- Venue: Quercia Stadium
- Level: Senior
- Events: 42+6

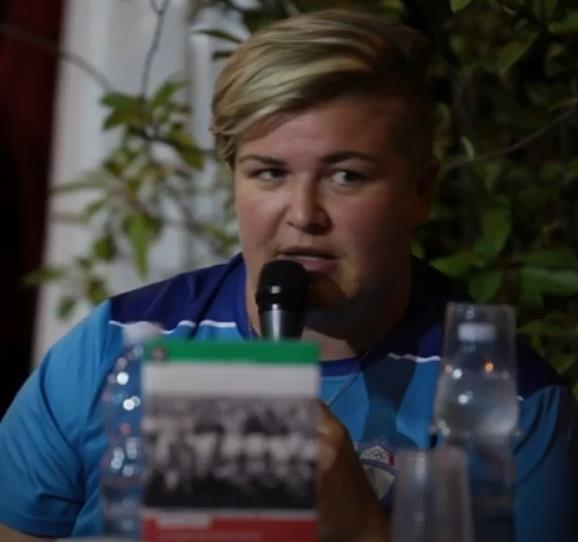
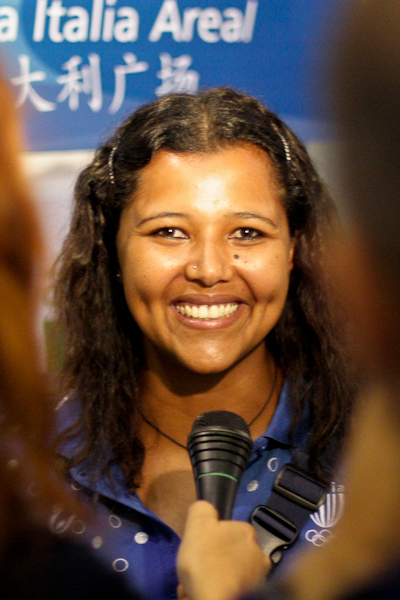
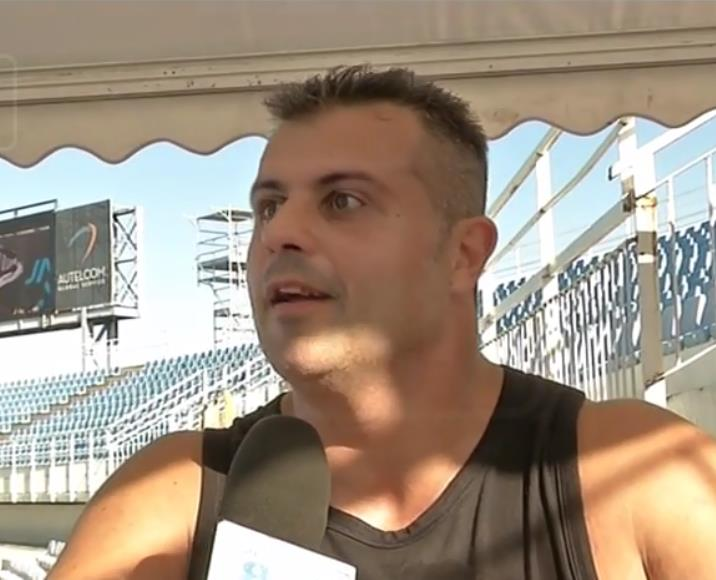
Chiara Rosa won her 29th senior national title (12 winter), Zahra Bani her 17th (9 winter) and Marco Lingua his 16th (9 winter).

The 2021 Italian Athletics Championships was the 111th edition of the Italian Athletics Championships which took place in Rovereto from 25 to 27 June. It is the second edition held in this town, after 2014 edition.

10 km Racewalking will be held in Corso Bettini with arrival outside the Museum of Modern and Contemporary Art of Trento and Rovereto. However national racewalking titles were also awarded earlier. 10,000 m championships were held in Molfetta on 2 May.

== National records ==
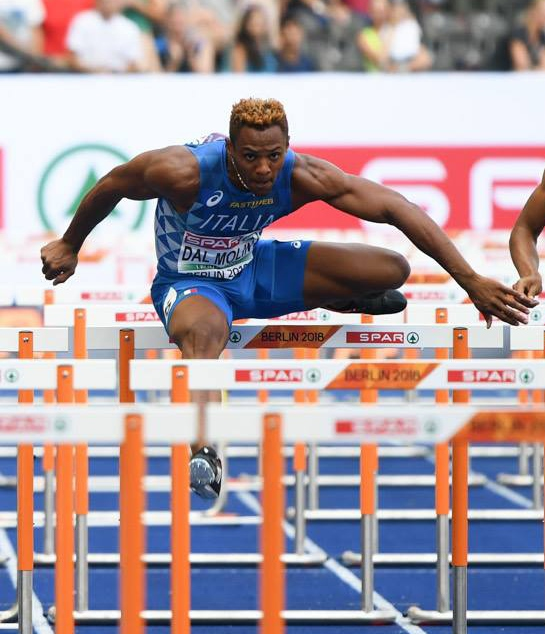
Paolo Dal Molin set national record and also the qualifying standard for Tokyo 2021.

- 110 metres hurdles: Paolo Dal Molin 13:27

== Champions ==
=== Road events ===
Date	Venue	Event	Men	Time	Women	Time	Notes
23 January	Ostia	50 km walk (men) 35 km (women)	Teodorico Caporaso	4:01:14	Eleonora Giorgi	3:00:21	
6 March	Grottaglie	20 km walk	Federico Tontodonati	1:20:12	Eleonora Giorgi	1:28:39	
2 May	Molfetta	10,000 m	Iliass Aouani	28:26.38	Martina Merlo	34:23.25	
25 June	Rovereto	10 km walk	Francesco Fortunato	40:02	Nicole Colombi	45:36	
7 November	Rome	Half marathon	Iliass Aouani	1:02:58	Giovanna Epis	1:11:01	
12 December	Reggio Emilia	Marathon	Antonino Lollo	2:16:22	Arianna Lutteri	2:50:09	

=== Track & field events ===
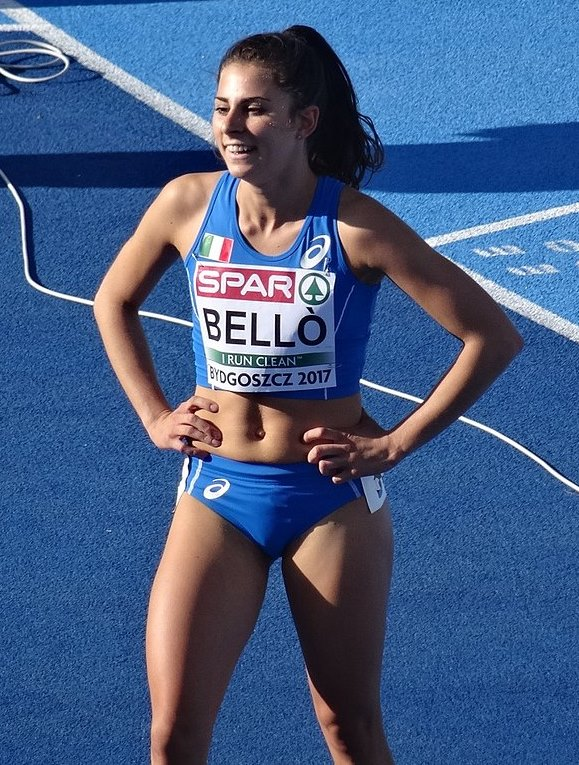
Elena Bellò wins her sixth national 800 m title, two outdoors and four indoors.

In the Quercia Stadium of Rovereto (26 and 27 June).

Note: athletes with a Q are qualified or already qualified for 2020 Olympics with Standard entry. Key:
≠ Athlete without Olympic qualifying standard, not selected
Athlete without Olympic qualifying standard, invited to Olympics based on world ranking position

Track events
Event	Men	Performance	Women	Performance
100 m	Marcell Jacobs Q	10.01 CR (-1.0)	Anna Bongiorni	11.27 PB (-1.0)
200 m	Fausto Desalu	20.38 SB (-1.8)	Dalia Kaddari	22.89 (+0.1)
400 m	Edoardo Scotti	46.13	Alice Mangione	52.09
800 m	Simone Barontini	1:46.13 PB	Elena Bellò	2:00.44 PB
1500 m	Mohamed Zerrad	3:39.31	Nadia Battocletti Q	4:09.38 PB
5000 m	Pietro Riva	13:52:38	Anna Arnaudo	15:57.69 PB
110/100 m hs	Paolo Dal Molin Q	13.27 NR (+1.2)	Luminosa Bogliolo Q	12.90 CR (+1.1)
400 m hs	Alessandro Sibilio	48.96 PB	Eleonora Marchiando Q	55.16 PB
3000 m st	Ala Zoghlami Q	8:17.65 PB	Martina Merlo	10:00.01
4 × 100 m relay	Atletica Riccardi; Alessandro Malvezzi; Simone Tanzilli; Diego Marani; Hillary Wanderson Polanco Rijo	40.16	Atletica Brescia 1950; Chiara Melon; Gaia Pedreschi; Alessia Niotta; Chiara Torrisi	45.42
4 × 400 m relay	Gruppo Sportivo Fiamme Azzurre; Lorenzo Benati; Simone Barontini; Lorenzo Veroli; Brayan Lopez	3:09.88	CUS Pro Patria Milano; Ilaria Burattin; Serena Troiani; Alexandra Troiani; Virginia Troiani	3:31.16 (NR for clubs)
Field events
High jump	Marco Fassinotti	2,26 m SB	Elena Vallortigara Q	1.88 m SB
Pole vault	Ivan De Angelis	5.50 m PB	Elisa Molinarolo	4.50 m
Long jump	Filippo Randazzo	7.94 m (+2.6)	Larissa Iapichino Q	6.42 m (+0.4)
Triple jump	Tobia Bocchi Q	17.14 m PB (+0.1)	Dariya Derkach Q	14.47 m PB (+0.5)
Shot put	Nick Ponzio Q	20.78 m	Chiara Rosa	16.79 m
Discus throw	Giovanni Faloci Q	60.10 m	Daisy Osakue	61.55 m CR
Hammer throw	Marco Lingua	74.47 m SB	Sara Fantini	70.34 m
Javelin throw	Roberto Orlando	80.35 m CR PB	Zahra Bani	55.50 m
Combined
Decathlon/Heptathlon	Lorenzo Modugno	7303 pts PB	Marta Giovannini	5496 pts

== Top ten results in the Italian all-time lists ==
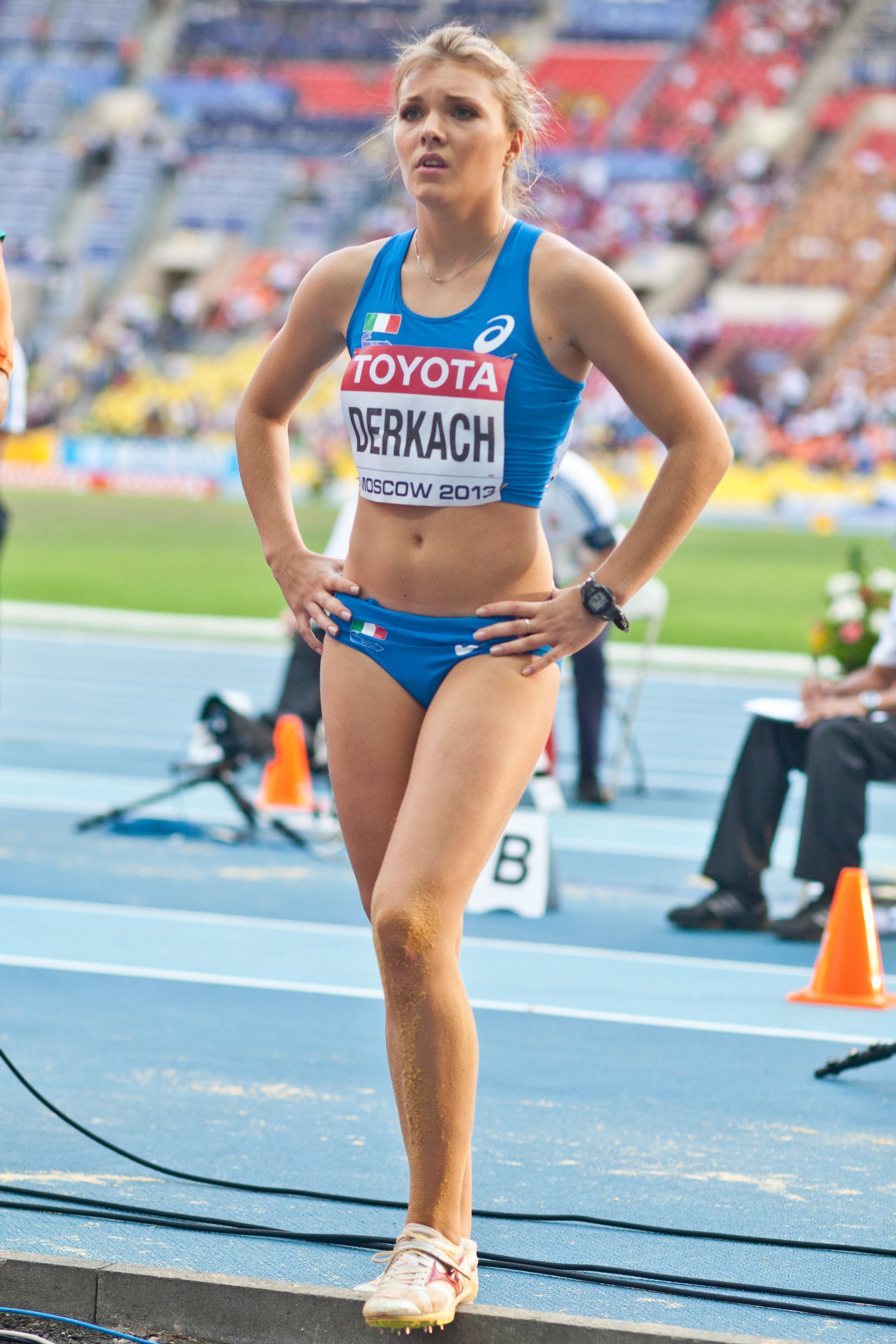
Dariya Derkach with 14.47 m in triple jump set the Olympic standard for Tokyo 2021.

In this edition of the championships 12 athletes, 6 men and 6 women, have set a top ten all-time performance in the Italian lists.

=== Men ===
Event	Athlete	Performance	Rank	Notes
110 m hs	Paolo Dal Molin	13.27	1	NR CR Olympic standard
110 m hs	Hassane Fofana	13.42	4	
400 m hs	Alessandro Sibilio	48.96	4	
3000 m st	Ala Zoghlami	8:17.65	9	CR Olympic standard
Triple jump	Tobia Bocchi	17.14 m	8	Olympic standard
Javelin throw	Roberto Orlando	80.35 m	7	CR

=== Women ===
Event	Athlete	Performance	Rank	Notes
100 m	Anna Bongiorni	11.27	5	
800 m	Elena Bellò	2:00.44	7	
800 m	Gaia Sabbatini	2:00.75	9	
400 m hs	Eleonora Marchiando	55.16	5	Olympic standard
400 m hs	Linda Olivieri	55.54	7	
Triple jump	Dariya Derkach	14.47 m	4	Olympic standard

== See also ==
- 2021 Italian Athletics Indoor Championships
