= Oneka Wilson =

Jamaican athlete (born 2003)

Personal information
- Nationality: Jamaican
- Born: 9 June 2003 (age 23)

Sport
- Country: Jamaica
- Sport: Athletics
- Event: Hurdling

Achievements and titles
- Personal bests: 60 mH: 7.95 (Clemson, 2025); 100 mH: 12.70 (Kingston, 2024)
Medal record
Women's athletics
Representing Jamaica
CARIFTA Games Junior (U20)
Silver medal – second place	2022 Kingston	100m hurdles

Oneka Wilson (born 9 June 2003) is a Jamaica hurdler.

== Biography ==
Wilson was educated at Hydel High School. She was a finalist competing for Jamaica in the 100 metres hurdles at the 2021 World Athletics U20 Championships in Nairobi, Kenya, but was unable to start in the final after testing positive for Covid-19.

Competing for Hydel High, Wilson won the ISSA GraceKennedy Boys and Girls’ Athletics Championships, breaking the Class One 100m hurdles record in a personal best time of 13.00 seconds. Wilson subsequently won a silver medal in the women’s under-20 100 metres hurdles at the 2022 CARIFTA Games. Although she missed the World U20 Championships that year due to injury, Wilson committed to compete for Clemson University in the United States under coach Lennox Graham, having received a scholarship offer.

Competing for Clemson, Wilson won the Atlantic Coast Conference (ACC) title over 60 metres hurdles in 2023, and would go on to retain the ACC title in 2024 and 2025. In February 2025 Wilson set a new personal best of 7.95 seconds in the event. In March 2025, Wilson placed third in the 60 metres hurdles at the 2025 NCAA Indoor Championships, in 7.99 seconds.

Wilson set a personal best of 12.70 seconds for the 100 metres hurdles at the 2024 Jamaican Athletics Championships in June 2024. She was a finalist at the 2025 NCAA Championships, placing fifth in 13.02 seconds. Wilson qualified for the final of the 100 metres hurdles at the 2025 Junior Pan American Games in Asunción, but was unable to compete in the final.

Continuing at Clemson, Wilson began her 2026 indoor season finishing runner-up to compatriot Danielle Williams over 60 metres hurdles at the Clemson Invitational. Competing at the 2026 NCAA Division I Indoor Track and Field Championships, she qualified for the final of the 60 metres hurdles, placing sixth overall. She ran in the 60 metres hurdles at the 2026 World Athletics Indoor Championships in Toruń, Poland. In June, Wilson qualified for the 2026 NCAA Outdoor Championships.
