= Tereza Čorejová =

Slovak hurdler (born 2005)

Personal information
- Born: 19 July 2005 (age 21)

Sport
- Sport: Athletics
- Event: Hurdles

Achievements and titles
- Personal bests: 100mH: 13.04 s (2025); 60mH: 8.07 s (2026)
Medal record
Women's athletics
Representing Slovakia
European U23 Championships
Bronze medal – third place	2025 Bergen	100 m Hurdles

Tereza Čorejová (born 19 July 2005) is a Slovak hurdler. She won the 60 metres hurdles at the 2026 Slovak Indoor Championships. She was a bronze medalist at the 2025 European Athletics U23 Championships in the 100 metres hurdles.

== Biography ==
She studied at the STU Academic Sport Centre in Bratislava and competed as a member of Naša atletika Bratislava under the coach Igor Gavenčiak. As a 14 year-old in January 2020, she broke the Slovak age-group record for the 60 metres hurdles, running 8.73 seconds to break the previous record set ten years previously by Monika Baňovičová. In March of that year, she also set the Slovakia age-group record in the 60 metres, running 7.81 seconds. By 2021, she had won twelve Slovak age-group championship titles, and also set twelve Slovak age-group national records. She was later coached by Peter Bottlík.

She opened her 2024 outdoor season in the 100 metres hurdles with a wind-aided 14.06 seconds in Košice in May 2024. She took part in the 100 metres hurdles at the 2024 World Athletics U20 Championships in Lima, Peru in August 2025.

She was runner up to Viktoria Forster in the 60 metres hurdles at the Slovak Indoor Championships in February 2025. She also placed fifth in the 60 metres final at the same championships. In June 2025, she improved her personal best for the 100 metres hurdles to 13.25 seconds to move to fourth on the Slovak all-time list. Later that month, she lowered her personal best to 13.04 seconds (+1.9 m/s) whilst competing in Banská Bystrica.

She won a bronze medal in the 100 meters hurdles at the 2025 European Athletics U23 Championships in Bergen, Norway, running just 0.01 outside her lifetime best with a time of 13.05 seconds into a headwind (-1.7 m/s) from an outside lane, having been only the eighth fastest qualifier from the semi-final, although she had previously ran the second fastest time in the preliminary round prior to the semi-finals. Later that month, she was a semi-finalist at the 2025 University Games in Germany.

Čorejová set a personal best of 8.07 seconds for the 60 metres hurdles in Vienna on 21 February 2026. The time moved her to third on the Slovak all-time list. The following week, she won the 60m hurdles title at the Slovak Indoor Athletics Championships with a time of 8.08 seconds in the final. She equalled her personal best the following month in Vienna, again running 8.07 seconds at the same venue as the previous month. She competed in the 60 metres hurdles at the 2026 World Athletics Indoor Championships in Toruń, Poland.

== Personal bests ==
- 100 metres hurdles – 13.04 (17 June 2025)
- 60 metres hurdles – 8.07 (21 February 2026)
- 100 metres – 11.81 (2025)
- 200 metres – 24.12 (2025)
