= Anna Tóth =

Hungarian athlete

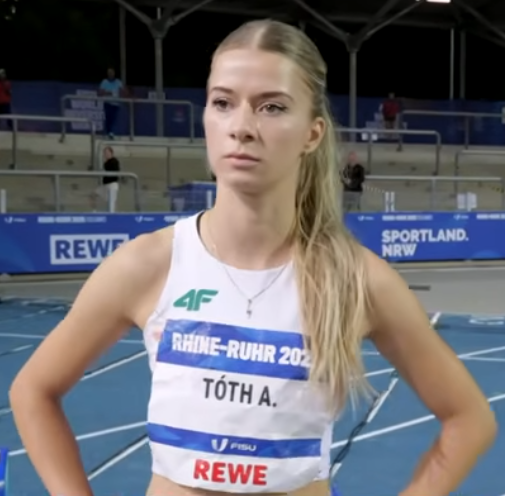
- At the 2025 Summer World University Games

Personal information
- Nationality: Hungarian
- Born: 20 November 2003 (age 22)

Sport
- Sport: Athletics
- Event: 100m hurdles

Achievements and titles
- Personal bests: 100m hurdles: 12.77 (Budapest, 2025)
Medal record
Women's athletics
Representing HUN
Summer World University Games
Silver medal – second place	2025 Bochum	100m hurdles
World U20 Championships
Bronze medal – third place	2021 Nairobi	100m hurdles
Bronze medal – third place	2022 Cali	100m hurdles
European U23 Championships
Silver medal – second place	2025 Bergen	100 m hurdles
Bronze medal – third place	2023 Espoo	100 m hurdles

Anna Tóth (born 20 November 2003) is a Hungarian track and field athlete. She has won Hungarian national championships in the 60 metres hurdles and the 100 metres hurdles and has represented Hungary at major championships in both disciplines.

== Biography ==
She won a bronze medal at the 2021 World Athletics U20 Championships in the women's 100 metres hurdles in August 2021 in Nairobi, Kenya. Toth won another bronze medal whilst competing at the 2022 World U20 Athletics Championships in Cali, Colombia, as she ran a new national under-20 record time of 13.00 for the 100 metres hurdles.

In July 2023, Toth won the bronze medal at the 2023 European Athletics U23 Championships in the women's 100 metres hurdles in Espoo, Finland. Later that month, she finished in second place at the Hungarian national championships, and set a new personal best time that also lowered the national under-23 record to 12.84 seconds. She was selected for the 2023 World Athletics Championships in Budapest in August 2023.

She won the 100 metres hurdles at the Hungarian Athletics Championships foe the first time in June 2024, just ending ahead of Greta Kerekes who was credited with the same time of 13.00 seconds.

She won the 60 metres hurdles title at the Hungarian Indoor Athletics Championships in Nyíregyháza on 22 February 2025 in a time of 7.95 seconds. she represented Hungary in the 60 metres hurdles at the 2025 European Athletics Indoor Championships in Apeldoorn, Netherlands, in March 2025, where she progressed to the semi-finals with a run of 8.05 seconds, but did not then qualify for the final. She was also then subsequently selected for the 2025 World Athletics Indoor Championships in Nanjing, but could not travel due to illness.

She won the silver medal in the 100 meters hurdles at the 2025 European Athletics U23 Championships in Bergen, Norway, running 13.02 seconds into a headwind (-1.7 m/s). She won the silver medal in the 100 metres hurdles at the 2025 World University Games in Germany. She lowered her personal best to 12.77 seconds for the 100 metres hurdles at the 2025 Hungarian Championships in Budapest. She competed at the 2025 World Athletics Championships in Tokyo, Japan.

In May 2026, she ran at the 2026 World Athletics Relays in the women's 4 × 100 metres relay in Gaborone, Botswana. In August 2026, she competed at the 2026 European Athletics Championships in Birmingham, England, in the women's 100 metres hurdles.
