= Alicja Sielska =

Polish hurdler (born 2003)

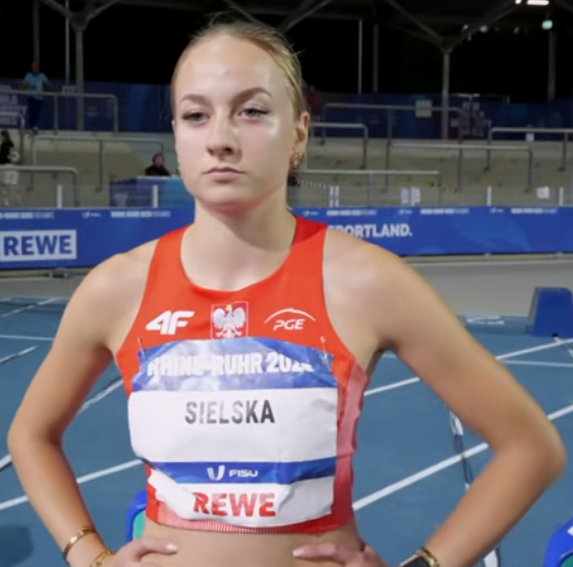
- At the 2025 Summer World University Games

Personal information
- Full name: Alicja Katarzyna Sielska
- Born: 12 July 2003 (age 22)
- Education: University School of Physical Education in Kraków

Sport
- Sport: Athletics
- Event: Hurdles

Achievements and titles
- Personal best(s): 100mH: 12.81 s (Chorzow, 2025); Indoors; 60mH: 8.03 s Łódź (2025)
Medal record
Women's athletics
Representing Poland
European U23 Championships
Gold medal – first place	2025 Bergen	100 m Hurdles
Summer World University Games
Bronze medal – third place	2025 Bochum	100m hurdles

Alicja Katarzyna Sielska (born 12 July 2003) is Polish hurdler. She won the gold medal at the 2025 European Athletics U23 Championships in the 100 metres hurdles.

== Career ==
As an under-16 athlete she competed in multi-events but was beset with knee injuries that required surgery and rehabilitation. She later became a member of KS AZS AWF Kraków. She won the Polish 100 metres hurdles title in the under-23 age-group in 2024 in Lublin, with a wind assisted time of 12.75 mph (+2.6 m/s).

She set a personal best for the 60 metres hurdles, running 8.03 seconds in Łódź in February 2025. She competed for Poland at the 2025 European Athletics Indoor Championships in Apeldoorn, Netherlands in March 2025 in the 60 metres hurdles but did not progress past the preliminary heats.

In May 2025, she won the Polish university championships in the 100 metres hurdles. She lowered her personal best to 12.86 seconds for the 100 metres hurdles in Gorzow in June 2025, in an event part of the World Athletics Continental Tour Bronze series. The time also placed her top of the European under-23 rankings. The following month, she started as favourite in the Polish under-23 championships for the 100 metres hurdles but fell at the final hurdle. She recovered to later win the national under-23 title in the 200 metres.

She won the gold medal in the 100 meters hurdles at the 2025 European Athletics U23 Championships in Bergen, Norway, running 12.91 seconds into a headwind (-1.7 m/s). She was the only athlete to dip below 13 seconds throughout the preliminary rounds which were also beset by headwinds. She won the bronze medal in the 100 metres hurdles at the 2025 World University Games in Germany. She set a new personal best at the 2025 Kamila Skolimowska Memorial, in Poland, with a run of 12.81 seconds for the 100 metres hurdles. In September, she ran 12.99 seconds at the 2025 World Athletics Championships in Tokyo, Japan without qualifying for the semi-finals.

Competing at the 2026 Polish Indoor Athletics Championships, she was runner-up to Pia Skrzyszowska in the 60 metres hurdles in 8.10 seconds, but ran 8.02 seconds in the heats to meet the automatic standard for the World Indoors.

== Personal life ==
She was born in Kędzierzyn-Koźle. She enrolled at the University of Physical Education in Kraków.
