= Aaliyah McCormick =

American sprint hurdler (born 2004)

Personal information
- Born: 17 September 2004 (age 21)

Sport
- Sport: Athletics
- Event: Hurdles

Achievements and titles
- Personal best(s): 60mH: 7.89 (2026); 100mH: 12.44 (2026)

Aaliyah McCormick (born 17 September 2004) is an American sprint hurdler. She won the 2025 and 2026 NCAA Outdoor Championships in the 100 metres hurdles, and the 2026 NCAA Indoor Championships title in the 60 metres hurdles.

== Early life ==
She attended Scripps Ranch High School in San Diego, California, before attending the University of Oregon.

== Career ==
McCormick won in the U20 100 meter hurdles at the USA Outdoor Track and Field Championships at Hayward Field in Eugene, Oregon, in July 2023, with a time of 13.02 seconds. She was subsequently selected for the United States team for the 2023 Pan American U20 Championships, in which she placed fifth in the final.

In March 2025, McCormick was runner-up to Jaiya Covington in the 60 metres hurdles at the 2025 NCAA Division I Indoor Track and Field Championships in Virginia Beach.

McCormick won the 2025 NCAA Outdoor Championships title over 100 metres hurdles in Eugene, Oregon in June 2025 in 12.81 seconds. She had won her semi-final in 12.76 seconds. She finished in seventh place in the 100m hurdles at the 2025 Prefontaine Classic on 5 July.

In February 2026, she won the 60m hurdles in 7.89 seconds at the Big Ten Indoor Championships. She won the 60 m hurdles at the 2026 NCAA Division I Indoor Track and Field Championships in 7.86 seconds, to move into the top-ten NCAA all-time list. In May, she ran the seventh-fastest time in collegiate history with 12.44 to win the 100 m hurdles at the NCAA Regionals. On 13 June, she ran 12.47 seconds in the final to retain the 100 metres hurdles title at the 2026 NCAA Outdoor Championships.
