= 2025 European Athletics Indoor Championships – Women's 60 metres hurdles =

Women's 60 metres hurdles at the 2025 European Athletics Indoor Championships
- Venue: Omnisport Apeldoorn
- Location: Apeldoorn, Netherlands
- Dates: 6 March 2025 (round 1); 7 March 2025 (semi-finals and final)
- Competitors: 32 from 21 nations
- Winning time: 7.67 ER, CR

Medalists
gold medal	Ditaji Kambundji	Switzerland
silver medal	Nadine Visser	Netherlands
bronze medal	Pia Skrzyszowska	Poland

The women's 60 metres hurdles at the 2025 European Athletics Indoor Championships was held on the short track of Omnisport in Apeldoorn, Netherlands, on 6 and 7 March 2025. This was the 36th time the event is contested at the European Athletics Indoor Championships. Athletes can qualify by achieving the entry standard or by their World Athletics Ranking in the event.

Round 1 was held on 6 March during the evening session. The semi-finals were held on 7 March during the morning session. The final was held on 7 March during the evening session.

== Background ==
The women's 60 metres hurdles was contested 35 times before 2025, at every previous edition of the European Athletics Indoor Championships (1970–2023), with the exception of 1972 and 1981, when the 50 metres hurdles were held instead. The 2025 European Athletics Indoor Championships were held in Omnisport Apeldoorn in Apeldoorn, Netherlands. The removable indoor athletics track was retopped for these championships in September 2024.

Devynne Charlton is the world record holder in the event, with a time of 7.65 set in 2024. Susanna Kallur is the European record holder with a time of 7.68, set in 2008. The championship record is held by Lyudmila Narozhilenko, who had a time of 7.74, and was set at the 1990 championships.

Records before the 2025 European Athletics Indoor Championships
Record	Athlete (nation)	Time (s)	Location	Date
World record	Devynne Charlton (BAH)	7.65	Glasgow, Great Britain	3 March 2024
European record	Susanna Kallur (SWE)	7.68	Karlsruhe, Germany	10 February 2008
Championship record	Lyudmila Narozhilenko (URS)	7.74	Glasgow, Great Britain	4 March 1990
World leading	Masai Russell (USA)	7.74	New York, United States	22 February 2025
European leading	Laëticia Bapté (FRA)	7.76	Miramas, France	22 February 2025

== Qualification ==
For the women's 60 metres hurdles, the qualification period runs from 25 February 2024 until 23 February 2025. Athletes can qualify by achieving the entry standards of 8.00 s indoors or by running 12.80 s over 100 metres hurdles outdoors. Athletes can also qualify by virtue of their World Athletics Ranking for the event. There is a target number of 32 athletes.

== Results ==
=== Round 1 ===
Round 1 was held on 6 March, starting at 20:50 (UTC+1) in the evening. First 3 in each heat (Q) and the next 4 by time (q) qualify for the semi-finals.

==== Heat 1 ====
Rank	Athlete	Nation	Time	Notes
1	Nadine Visser	Netherlands	7.89	Q
2	Lotta Harala	Finland	8.00	Q, =PB
3	Elisa Di Lazzaro	Italy	8.05 [.041]	Q, SB
4	Anna Tóth	Hungary	8.05 [.049]	q
5	Sacha Alessandrini	France	8.05 [.050]	q
6	Mia Wild	Croatia	8.11	
7	Diana Suumann	Estonia	8.13	
8	Hanna Plotitsyna	Ukraine	8.24	

==== Heat 2 ====
Rank	Athlete	Nation	Time	Notes
1	Ditaji Kambundji	Switzerland	7.92	Q
2	Rosina Schneider	Germany	7.97	Q
3	Ida Beiter Bomme	Denmark	8.01	Q
4	Helena Jiranová	Czech Republic	8.06	
5	Saara Keskitalo	Finland	8.09 [.083]	
6	Nika Glojnarič	Slovenia	8.09 [.084]	
7	Marika Majewska	Poland	8.24	
8	Lovise Skarbøvik Andresen	Norway	8.32	

==== Heat 3 ====
Rank	Athlete	Nation	Time	Notes
1	Pia Skrzyszowska	Poland	7.88	Q
2	Giada Carmassi	Italy	7.98	Q, PB
3	Marlene Meier	Germany	8.01	Q
4	Kreete Verlin	Estonia	8.08	
5	Viktória Forster	Slovakia	8.11	
6	Anja Lukić	Serbia	8.12	
7	Beatrice Juškevičiūtė	Lithuania	8.14	
8	Selina von Jackowski	Switzerland	8.22	

==== Heat 4 ====
Rank	Athlete	Nation	Time	Notes
1	Sarah Lavin	Ireland	7.93	Q, SB
2	Laëticia Bapté	France	7.97	Q
3	Karin Strametz	Austria	7.99	Q, PB
4	Reetta Hurske	Finland	8.03	q, =SB
5	Luca Kozák	Hungary	8.04	q
6	Alicja Sielska	Poland	8.12	
7	Maayke Tjin-A-Lim	Netherlands	8.13	
8	Elisavet Pesiridou	Greece	8.70	

=== Semi-finals ===
The semi-finals were held on 7 March, starting at 13:45 (UTC+1) in the afternoon. First 3 in each heat (Q) and the next 2 by time (q) qualify for the final.

==== Heat 1 ====
Rank	Athlete	Nation	Time	Notes
1	Pia Skrzyszowska	Poland	7.84	Q, SB
2	Sarah Lavin	Ireland	7.94	Q
3	Luca Kozák	Hungary	7.96	Q, SB
4	Lotta Harala	Finland	7.97	q, PB
5	Rosina Schneider	Germany	8.01 [.003]	
6	Karin Strametz	Austria	8.01 [.009]	
7	Elisa Di Lazzaro	Italy	8.05	=SB
8	Sacha Alessandrini	France	8.08	

==== Heat 2 ====
Rank	Athlete	Nation	Time	Notes
1	Ditaji Kambundji	Switzerland	7.82	Q
2	Nadine Visser	Netherlands	7.85	Q
3	Reetta Hurske	Finland	7.96	Q, SB
4	Marlene Meier	Germany	7.97	q
5	Giada Carmassi	Italy	8.04	
6	Anna Tóth	Hungary	8.08	
7	Laëticia Bapté	France	8.12 [.114]	
8	Ida Beiter Bomme	Denmark	8.12 [.115]	

=== Final ===
The final was held on 7 March, starting at 21:43 (UTC+1) in the evening.

Rank	Athlete	Nation	Time	Notes
1st place, gold medalist(s)	Ditaji Kambundji	Switzerland	7.67	ER, CR, WL
2nd place, silver medalist(s)	Nadine Visser	Netherlands	7.72	NR
3rd place, bronze medalist(s)	Pia Skrzyszowska	Poland	7.83	SB
4	Sarah Lavin	Ireland	7.92	SB
5	Reetta Hurske	Finland	8.00	
6	Marlene Meier	Germany	8.04	
—	Luca Kozák	Hungary	DNF	
—	Lotta Harala	Finland	DNF	
