= 2024 European Athletics Championships – Women's 100 metres hurdles =

Women's 100 metres hurdles at the 2024 European Athletics Championships
- Venue: Stadio Olimpico
- Location: Rome
- Dates: 7 June (heats); 8 June (semifinals & final)
- Competitors: 34 from 22 nations
- Winning time: 12.31 CR

Medalists
| gold medal | Cyréna Samba-Mayela | France |
| silver medal | Ditaji Kambundji | Switzerland |
| bronze medal | Pia Skrzyszowska | Poland |

The women's 100 metres hurdles at the 2024 European Athletics Championships took place at the Stadio Olimpico on 7 and 8 June.

== Records ==
Standing records prior to the 2024 European Athletics Championships
| World record | Tobi Amusan (NGR) | 12.12 | Eugene, Oregon, United States | 24 July 2022 |
| European record | Yordanka Donkova (BUL) | 12.21 | Stara Zagora, Bulgaria | 20 August 1988 |
| Championship record | Yordanka Donkova (BUL) | 12.38 | Stuttgart, West Germany | 29 August 1986 |
| World Leading | Tobi Amusan (NGR) | 12.40 | Kingston, Jamaica | 11 May 2024 |
| Europe Leading | Ditaji Kambundji (SUI) | 12.49 | Doha, Qatar | 10 May 2024 |

== Schedule ==
| Date | Time | Round |
|---|---|---|
| 7 June 2024 | 10:10 | Round 1 |
| 8 June 2024 | 20:12 | Semifinals |
| 8 June 2024 | 22:08 | Final |

All times are local times (UTC+2)

== Results ==
=== Round 1 ===
The 11 fastest (q) advanced to the semifinals. The 13 highest ranked athletes received a bye into the semifinals.

Klaudia Wojtunik was originally disqualified for a false start in heat 2, but successfully appealed the decision and was allowed a rerun.

Wind:
Heat 1: +0.1 m/s, Heat 2: -1.3 m/s, Heat 3: 0.0 m/s, Rerun: +0.4 m/s

| Rank | Heat | Lane | Name | Nationality | Time | Note |
|---|---|---|---|---|---|---|
| 1 | 1 | 6 | Lotta Harala | Finland | 12.91 | q |
| 2 | 1 | 4 | Klaudia Siciarz | Poland | 12.94 | q, SB |
| 3 | 1 | 5 | Lovise Skarbøvik Andresen | Norway | 12.96 | q, PB |
| 4 | 3 | 6 | Karin Strametz | Austria | 12.99 | q |
| 5 | 1 | 3 | Gréta Kerekes | Hungary | 13.02 | q |
| 6 | 1 | 2 | Veronica Besana | Italy | 13.05 | q |
| 7 | 3 | 2 | Rosina Schneider | Germany | 13.10 | q |
| 8 | 3 | 8 | Marika Majewska | Poland | 13.11 | q |
| 9 | 3 | 7 | Giada Carmassi | Italy | 13.13 | q |
| 10 | 2 | 7 | Nika Glojnarič | Slovenia | 13.21 | q |
| 11 | Rerun | 2 | Klaudia Wojtunik | Poland | 13.22 | q |
| 12 | 2 | 5 | Elena Carraro | Italy | 13.23 | q |
| 13 | 3 | 4 | Milica Emini | Serbia | 13.24 | |
| 14 | 2 | 6 | Marlene Meier | Germany | 13.25 | |
| 15 | 3 | 3 | Elisavet Pesiridou | Greece | 13.32 | |
| 16 | 1 | 7 | Anna Plotitsyna | Ukraine | 13.35 | |
| 17 | 2 | 8 | Mette Graversgaard | Denmark | 13.42 | SB |
| 18 | 2 | 4 | Stanislava Škvarková | Slovakia | 13.44 | |
| 19 | 2 | 3 | Helena Jiranová | Czech Republic | 13.45 | |
| 20 | 3 | 5 | Anne Zagré | Belgium | 13.70 | |
| 21 | 1 | 8 | Anamaria Nesteriuc | Romania | 14.09 | SB |

=== Semifinals ===
First 2 in each heat (Q) and the next 2 fastest (q) advance to the final.

Wind:
Heat 1: +0.1 m/s, Heat 2: +0.4 m/s, Heat 3: +0.1 m/s

| Rank | Heat | Lane | Name | Nationality | Time | Note |
|---|---|---|---|---|---|---|
| 1 | 2 | 4 | Cyréna Samba-Mayela* | France | 12.43 | Q, EL |
| 2 | 2 | 7 | Pia Skrzyszowska* | Poland | 12.62 | Q |
| 3 | 3 | 5 | Cindy Sember* | Great Britain | 12.64 | Q |
| 4 | 1 | 7 | Sarah Lavin* | Ireland | 12.73 | Q, =SB |
| 5 | 2 | 5 | Reetta Hurske* | Finland | 12.78 | q, SB |
| 6 | 1 | 6 | Ditaji Kambundji* | Switzerland | 12.79 | Q |
| 7 | 3 | 7 | Nadine Visser* | Netherlands | 12.81 | Q |
| 8 | 3 | 6 | Viktória Forster* | Slovakia | 12.83 | q, SB |
| 9 | 1 | 9 | Klaudia Wojtunik | Poland | 12.84 | PB |
| 10 | 2 | 9 | Karin Strametz | Austria | 12.87 | PB |
| 11 | 2 | 2 | Lovise Skarbøvik Andresen | Norway | 12.89 | PB |
| 12 | 3 | 2 | Klaudia Siciarz | Poland | 12.94 | |
| 13 | 3 | 4 | Laëticia Bapté* | France | 12.95 | |
| 14 | 3 | 3 | Lotta Harala | Finland | 12.98 | |
| 15 | 3 | 9 | Giada Carmassi | Italy | 13.00 | |
| 16 | 2 | 6 | Luca Kozák* | Hungary | 13.01 | SB |
| 17 | 2 | 8 | Veronica Besana | Italy | 13.02 | |
| 18 | 3 | 8 | Gréta Kerekes | Hungary | 13.05 | |
| 19 | 1 | 1 | Elena Carraro | Italy | 13.06 | SB |
| 20 | 1 | 5 | Maayke Tjin-A-Lim* | Netherlands | 13.08 | |
| 21 | 2 | 3 | Marika Majewska | Poland | 13.08 | |
| 22 | 1 | 3 | Nika Glojnarič | Slovenia | 13.15 | |
| 23 | 1 | 4 | Natalia Christofi* | Cyprus | 13.20 | |
| 24 | 1 | 2 | Rosina Schneider | Germany | 13.41 | |
| | 1 | 8 | Anna Tóth* | Hungary | DNF | |

*Athletes that received a bye into the semifinal

=== Final ===
The final was started on 8 June at 22:08.

Wind: +0.8 m/s

| Rank | Lane | Name | Nationality | Time | Note |
|---|---|---|---|---|---|
| 1st place, gold medalist(s) | 5 | Cyréna Samba-Mayela | France | 12.31 | WL, CR, NR |
| 2nd place, silver medalist(s) | 8 | Ditaji Kambundji | Switzerland | 12.40 | EU23R, NR |
| 3rd place, bronze medalist(s) | 6 | Pia Skrzyszowska | Poland | 12.42 | PB |
| 4 | 7 | Cindy Sember | Great Britain | 12.56 | SB |
| 5 | 3 | Nadine Visser | Netherlands | 12.72 | SB |
| 6 | 9 | Reetta Hurske | Finland | 12.84 | |
| 7 | 4 | Sarah Lavin | Ireland | 12.94 | |
| 8 | 2 | Viktória Forster | Slovakia | 13.25 | |
