= 2025 World Athletics Indoor Championships – Women's 60 metres hurdles =

Women's 60 metres hurdles at the 2025 World Athletics Indoor Championships
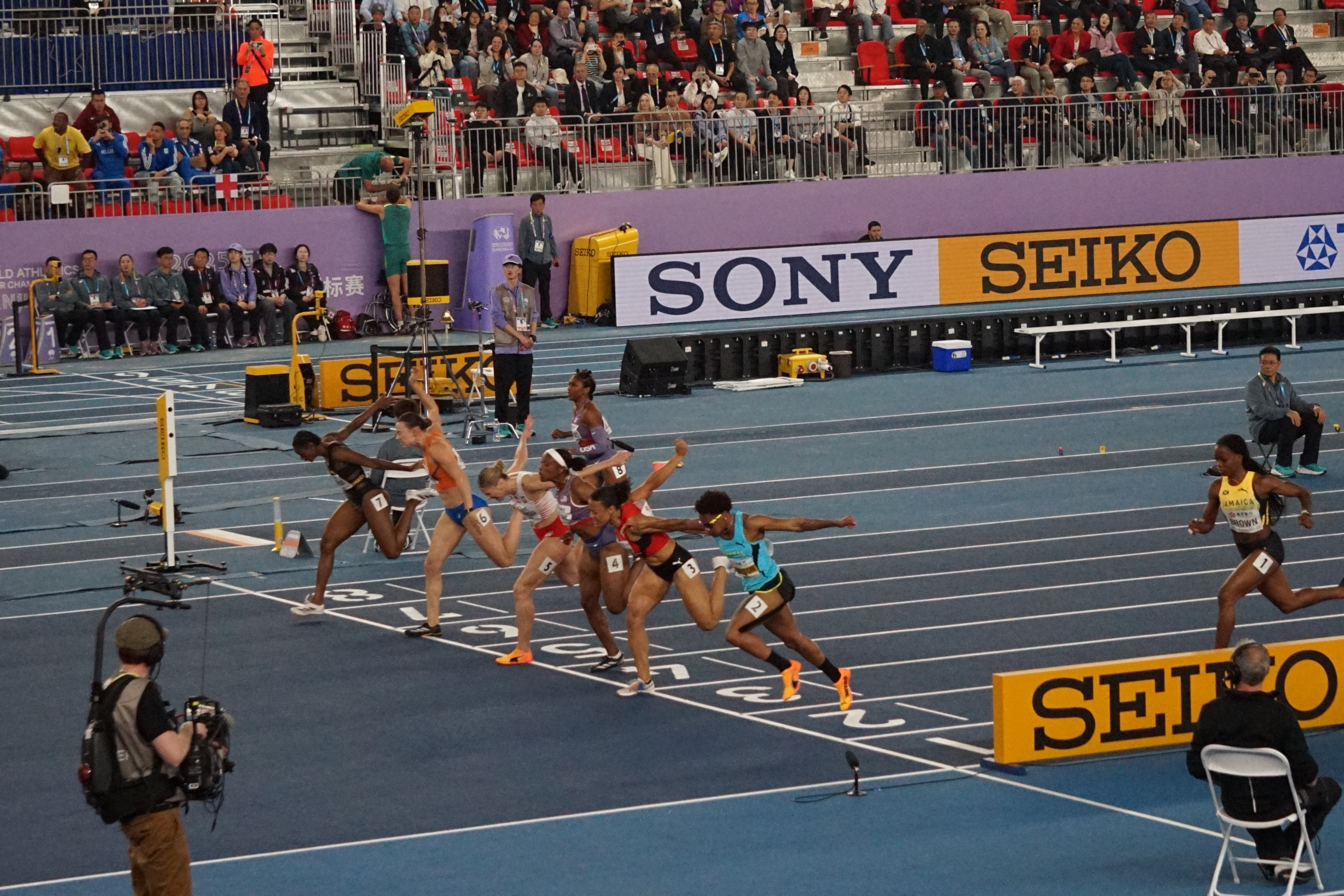
- The finish of the final
- Venue: Nanjing's Cube at Nanjing Youth Olympic Sports Park
- Location: Nanjing, China
- Dates: 23 March
- Competitors: 35 from 26 nations
- Winning time: 7.72

Medalists
gold medal	Devynne Charlton	Bahamas
silver medal	Ditaji Kambundji	Switzerland
bronze medal	Ackera Nugent	Jamaica

The women's 60 metres hurdles at the 2025 World Athletics Indoor Championships took place on the short track of the Nanjing's Cube at Nanjing Youth Olympic Sports Park in Nanjing, China, on 23 March 2025. This was the 21st time the event was contested at the World Athletics Indoor Championships. Athletes could qualify by achieving the entry standard or by their World Athletics Ranking in the event.

The heats took place on 23 March during the morning session. The semi-finals and the final took place on 23 March during the evening session.

== Background ==
The women's 60 metres hurdles was contested 20 times before 2025, at every previous edition of the World Athletics Indoor Championships.

Records before the 2025 World Athletics Indoor Championships
Record	Athlete (nation)	Time (s)	Location	Date
World record	Devynne Charlton (BAH)	7.65	Glasgow, United Kingdom	3 March 2024
Championship record	Devynne Charlton (BAH)	7.65	Glasgow, United Kingdom	3 March 2024
World leading	Ditaji Kambundji (SUI)	7.67	Apeldoorn, Netherlands	10 February 2025

== Qualification ==
For the women's 60 metres hurdles, the qualification period ran from 1 September 2024 until 9 March 2025. Athletes could qualify by achieving the entry standards of 7.94 s. Athletes could also qualify by virtue of their World Athletics Ranking for the event or by virtue of their World Athletics Indoor Tour wildcard. There was a target number of 48 athletes.

== Results ==
=== Heats ===
The heats were held on 23 March, starting at 10:25 (UTC+8) in the morning.

==== Heat 1 ====
Place	Lane	Athlete	Nation	Time	Notes
1	5	Ackera Nugent	Jamaica	7.90	Q
2	7	Christina Clemons	United States	7.95	Q
3	3	Ida Beiter Bomme	Denmark	8.05	Q
4	6	Yumi Tanaka	Japan	8.06	Q
5	2	Helena Jiranová	Czech Republic	8.07 [.064]	q
6	8	Tatiana Aholou	Canada	8.07 [.065]	q
7	4	Sofia Iosifidou	Greece	8.28	

==== Heat 2 ====
Place	Lane	Athlete	Nation	Time	Notes
1	8	Devynne Charlton	Bahamas	7.94	Q
2	5	Sarah Lavin	Ireland	8.04	Q
3	2	Micaela de Mello	Brazil	8.06	Q
4	3	Mia Wild	Croatia	8.13	Q
5	6	Giada Carmassi	Italy	8.15	
6	7	Diana Suumann	Estonia	8.19	
7	4	Annika Baun Haldbo	Denmark	8.23	

==== Heat 3 ====
Place	Lane	Athlete	Nation	Time	Notes
1	5	Nadine Visser	Netherlands	7.82	Q
2	7	Amber Hughes	United States	8.03	Q
3	2	Aasia Laurencin	Saint Lucia	8.06	Q
4	8	Elisa Di Lazzaro	Italy	8.09	Q
5	6	Marija Bukvić	Serbia	8.24	
6	4	Viktória Forster	Slovakia	8.26 [.252]	
7	3	Hanna Plotitsyna	Ukraine	8.26 [.258]	

==== Heat 4 ====
Place	Lane	Athlete	Nation	Time	Notes
1	5	Grace Stark	United States	7.73	Q, PB
2	7	Denisha Cartwright	Bahamas	7.78	Q, PB
3	3	Amoi Brown	Jamaica	7.98	Q
4	4	Wu Yanni	China	8.05	Q, PB
5	8	Nika Glojnarič	Slovenia	8.11	q
6	2	Anja Lukic	Serbia	8.16	
7	6	Sienna MacDonald	Canada	8.18	

==== Heat 5 ====
Place	Lane	Athlete	Nation	Time	Notes
1	6	Pia Skrzyszowska	Poland	7.83	Q, SB
2	5	Ditaji Kambundji	Switzerland	7.85	Q
3	7	Lotta Harala	Finland	8.07	Q
4	3	Sidonie Fiadanantsoa	Madagascar	8.08	Q, SB
5	4	Kreete Verlin	Estonia	8.09	q
6	2	Zhang Bo-ya	Chinese Taipei	8.27	NR
7	8	Cecilia Guambe	Mozambique	8.59	NR

=== Semi-finals ===
The semi-finals were held on 23 March, starting at 19:35 (UTC+8).

==== Heat 1 ====
Place	Lane	Athlete	Nation	Time	Notes
1	3	Pia Skrzyszowska	Poland	7.79	Q, SB
2	6	Ackera Nugent	Jamaica	8.00	Q
3	2	Wu Yanni	China	8.01	NR
4	1	Helena Jiranová	Czech Republic	8.08	
5	7	Lotta Harala	Finland	8.10	
6	8	Tatiana Aholou	Canada	8.11	
7	5	Sarah Lavin	Ireland	8.14	
8	4	Amber Hughes	United States	8.21	

==== Heat 2 ====
Place	Lane	Athlete	Nation	Time	Notes
1	4	Nadine Visser	Netherlands	7.81	Q
2	3	Devynne Charlton	Bahamas	7.82	Q, SB
3	6	Christina Clemons	United States	7.93	q
4	5	Amoi Brown	Jamaica	7.96	q
5	7	Yumi Tanaka	Japan	8.03	
6	1	Mia Wild	Croatia	8.10	
7	8	Kreete Verlin	Estonia	8.21	
8	2	Aasia Laurencin	Saint Lucia	8.60	

==== Heat 3 ====
Place	Lane	Athlete	Nation	Time	Notes
1	4	Grace Stark	United States	7.72	Q, PB
2	6	Ditaji Kambundji	Switzerland	7.76	Q
3	3	Denisha Cartwright	Bahamas	8.08	
4	7	Sidonie Fiadanantsoa	Madagascar	8.11	
5	8	Nika Glojnarič	Slovenia	8.16	
6	5	Ida Beiter Bomme	Denmark	8.19	
7	1	Elisa Di Lazzaro	Italy	8.42	
8	2	Micaela de Mello	Brazil	DQ	TR22.6.2[K]

=== Final ===
The final was held on 23 March, starting at 21:01 (UTC+8).

Place	Lane	Athlete	Nation	Time	Notes
1st place, gold medalist(s)	2	Devynne Charlton	Bahamas	7.72	SB
2nd place, silver medalist(s)	3	Ditaji Kambundji	Switzerland	7.73	
3rd place, bronze medalist(s)	7	Ackera Nugent	Jamaica	7.74 [.735]	SB
4	5	Pia Skrzyszowska	Poland	7.74 [.738]	NR
5	4	Grace Stark	United States	7.74 [.740]	
6	6	Nadine Visser	Netherlands	7.76	
7	8	Christina Clemons	United States	8.03	
8	1	Amoi Brown	Jamaica	8.07	
