= 2026 European Athletics Championships – Women's 100 metres hurdles =

Women's 100 metres hurdles at the 2026 European Athletics Championships
- Venue: Alexander Stadium
- Location: Birmingham, United Kingdom
- Dates: 10 August 2026 (round 1); 11 August 2026 (semi-finals & final)
- Competitors: 36
- Winning time: 12.67

Medalists
gold medal	Nadine Visser	Netherlands
silver medal	Pia Skrzyszowska	Poland
bronze medal	Laëticia Bapté	France

The women's 100 metres hurdles at the 2026 European Athletics Championships took place over three rounds at the Alexander Stadium in Birmingham, United Kingdom, on 10 and 11 August 2026.

== Background ==
Records before the 2026 European Athletics Championships
Record	Athlete (nation)	Time	Location	Date
World record	Tobi Amusan (NGR)	12.12	Eugene, Oregon, United States	24 July 2022
European record	Yordanka Donkova (BUL)	12.21	Stara Zagora, Bulgaria	20 August 1988
Championship record	Cyrena Samba-Mayela (FRA)	12.31	Rome, Italy	8 June 2024
World leading	Masai Russell (USA)	12.14	Xiamen, China	23 May 2026
European leading	Nadine Visser (NED)	12.41	Paris, France	28 June 2026

== Qualification ==
For the women's 100 metres hurdles, the qualification period was from 27 July 2025 to 26 July 2026. Athletes qualified by running the entry standard of 12.88 or faster, by wildcard for the 2024 European Athletics Champion (not used since Cyréna Samba-Mayela elected not to participate), or by their position on the World Athletics Rankings for the event. The target number was 36 athletes.

Qualification standings per 31 July 2026
QP	CP	Country	Athlete	PB	SB	Status	Details
1	1	Switzerland	Ditaji Kambundji	12.24	12.62	Qualified by Entry Standard	12.24 - National Stadium, Tokyo (JPN) - 15 SEP 2025
2	1	Netherlands	Nadine Visser	12.28	12.41	Qualified by Entry Standard	12.28 - Stadion Śląski, Chorzów (POL) - 16 AUG 2025
3	1	Poland	Pia Skrzyszowska	12.37	12.44	Qualified by Entry Standard	12.44 - Stade Raymond Petit, Tomblaine (FRA) - 03 JUL 2026
4	1	France	Sacha Alessandrini	12.53	12.53	Qualified by Entry Standard	12.53 - Stade Pierre de Coubertin, Montgeron (FRA) - 19 JUN 2026
5	1	Hungary	Luca Kozák	12.59	12.59	Qualified by Entry Standard	12.59 - Nemzeti Atlétikai Központ, Budapest (HUN) - 14 JUL 2026
6	2	France	Laëticia Bapté	12.60	12.60	Qualified by Entry Standard	12.60 - Stade Raymond Petit, Tomblaine (FRA) - 03 JUL 2026
7	1	Slovakia	Viktória Forster	12.63	13.12	Qualified by Entry Standard	12.63 - Štadión SNP, Banská Bystrica (SVK) - 08 AUG 2025
8	1	Finland	Saara Keskitalo	12.64	12.64	Qualified by Entry Standard	12.64 - Stadion, Lahti (FIN) - 10 JUN 2026
9	1	Great Britain & N.I.	Marcia Sey	12.65	12.65	Qualified by Entry Standard	12.65 - Alexander Stadium, Birmingham (GBR) - 20 JUN 2026
10	2	Finland	Lotta Harala	12.65	12.78	Qualified by Entry Standard	12.67 - Leppävaaran Stadion, Espoo (FIN) - 01 AUG 2025
11	2	Netherlands	Maayke Tjin-A-Lim	12.66	12.86	Qualified by Entry Standard	12.68 - FBK Stadium, Hengelo (NED) - 03 AUG 2025
12	1	Germany	Franziska Schuster	12.69	12.69	Qualified by Entry Standard	12.69 - Lohrheidestadion, Wattenscheid, Bochum (GER) - 25 JUL 2026
13	1	Belgium	Yanla Ndjip-Nyemeck	12.71	12.81	Qualified by Entry Standard	12.74 - National Stadium, Tokyo (JPN) - 14 SEP 2025
14	1	Italy	Celeste Polzonetti	12.74	12.74	Qualified by Entry Standard	12.74 - Hayward Field, Eugene, OR (USA) - 11 JUN 2026
15	1	Norway	Martine Kolbeinshavn Hjørnevik	12.74	12.74	Qualified by Entry Standard	12.74 - Østerbro Stadium, Copenhagen (DEN) - 22 JUN 2026
16	2	Hungary	Anna Tóth	12.77	12.79	Qualified by Entry Standard	12.77 - Nemzeti Atlétikai Központ, Budapest (HUN) - 03 AUG 2025
17	2	Germany	Rosina Schneider	12.77	12.77	Qualified by Entry Standard	12.77 - Paul-Greifzu-Stadion, Dessau (GER) - 19 JUN 2026
18	2	Italy	Elena Carraro	12.79	12.85	Qualified by Entry Standard	12.79 - National Stadium, Tokyo (JPN) - 15 SEP 2025
19	1	Denmark	Ida Beiter Bomme	12.79	12.79	Qualified by Entry Standard	12.79 - Østerbro Stadium, Copenhagen (DEN) - 22 JUN 2026
20	3	Italy	Giada Carmassi	12.69	12.90	Qualified by Entry Standard	12.83 - National Stadium, Tokyo (JPN) - 14 SEP 2025
21	3	Germany	Lia Flotow	12.83	12.83	Qualified by Entry Standard	12.83 - Lohrheidestadion, Wattenscheid, Bochum (GER) - 25 JUL 2026
22	2	Switzerland	Larissa Bertényi	12.84	12.84	Qualified by Entry Standard	12.84 - Sportzentrum Niederösterreich, St. Pölten (AUT) - 04 JUN 2026
reserve	4	Germany	Marlene Meier	12.84	12.84	Qualified by Entry Standard	12.84 - Paul-Greifzu-Stadion, Dessau (GER) - 19 JUN 2026
23	2	Poland	Klaudia Wojtunik	12.84	12.84	Qualified by Entry Standard	12.84 - Kuortaneen keskusurheilukenttä, Kuortane (FIN) - 20 JUN 2026
24	1	Ireland	Sarah Lavin	12.62	13.31	Qualified by Entry Standard	12.86 - National Stadium, Tokyo (JPN) - 15 SEP 2025
25	2	Great Britain & N.I.	Emma Nwofor	12.86	12.86	Qualified by Entry Standard	12.86 - Percy Beard Track, Gainesville, FL (USA) - 18 APR 2026
reserve	5	Germany	Ricarda Lobe	12.82	12.86	Qualified by Entry Standard	12.86 - Lohrheidestadion, Wattenscheid, Bochum (GER) - 25 JUL 2026
26	2	Norway	Elea Jørstad Bock	12.87	12.87	Qualified by Entry Standard	12.87 - Trondheim Stadion, Trondheim (NOR) - 25 JUL 2026
27	1	Austria	Karin Strametz	12.81	12.97	Qualified by Entry Standard	12.88 - Štadión SNP, Banská Bystrica (SVK) - 08 AUG 2025
28	1	Czech Republic	Ester Bendová	12.89	12.89	Qualified by World Rankings	31st - 1204 points
29	3	Netherlands	Mira Groot-Romijn	12.91	12.98	Qualified by World Rankings	34th - 1202 points
30	3	Switzerland	Selina von Jackowski	12.94	12.98	Qualified by World Rankings	39th - 1189 points
31	3	Norway	Lovise Skarbøvik Andresen	12.89	12.95	Qualified by World Rankings	40th - 1188 points
32	2	Denmark	Annika Baun Haldbo	12.96	12.96	Qualified by World Rankings	42nd - 1186 points
33	2	Czech Republic	Tereza Elena Šínová	12.92	12.92	Qualified by World Rankings	43rd - 1184 points
34	1	Serbia	Milica Emini	12.99	13.16	Qualified by World Rankings	45th - 1180 points
35	3	Denmark	Mette Laugesen Kammer	12.83	12.96	Qualified by World Rankings	46th - 1177 points
reserve	4	Italy	Veronica Besana	12.88	13.06	Qualified by World Rankings	49th - 1170 points
36	1	Spain	Lerato Pagès	13.06	13.06	Qualified by World Rankings	56th - 1164 points
reserve	1	Estonia	Anna Maria Millend	13.10	13.10	Next best by World Rankings	58th - 1163 points
reserve	1	Portugal	Melissa Sereno	13.16	13.20	Next best by World Rankings	61st - 1160 points
reserve	5	Italy	Nicla Mosetti	13.02	13.07	Next best by World Rankings	64th - 1157 points
reserve	3	Czech Republic	Pavla Kvasničková	12.94	12.94	Next best by World Rankings	67th - 1153 points
reserve	1	Greece	Sofia Iosifidou	13.08	13.30	Next best by World Rankings	69th - 1153 points
reserve	1	Cyprus	Dafni Georgiou	13.09	13.39	Next best by World Rankings	71st - 1152 points
reserve	1	Croatia	Mia Wild	13.10	13.24	Next best by World Rankings	73rd - 1147 points
reserve	3	Finland	Vilma Mäki	12.88	13.20	Next best by World Rankings	74th - 1147 points

Bye to semi-finals	Reserve activated	Withdrawal / reserve unused

== Schedule ==
Date	Time	Round
10 August 2026	19:35	Round 1
11 August 2026	19:55	Semi-finals
11 August 2026	21:30	Final

All times are local times (UTC+1)

== Results ==
=== Round 1 ===
Round 1 was held on 10 August 2026, at 19:35 in the evening. The 12 fastest (q) qualified for the semi-finals.′

==== Heat 1 ====
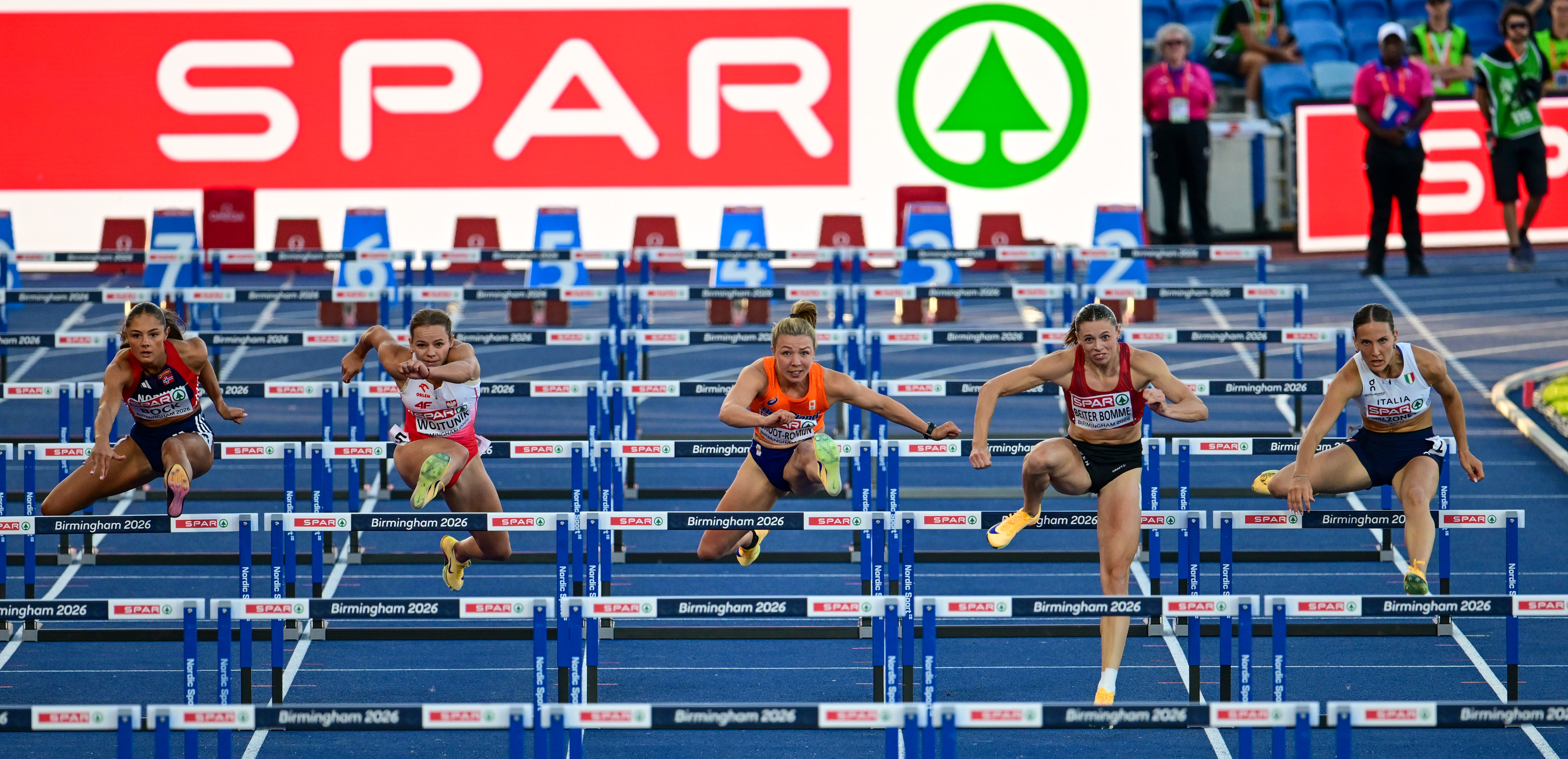
Heat 1

Place	Lane	Athlete	Nation	Time	Notes
1	2	Celeste Polzonetti	Italy	12.80	q
2	3	Ida Beiter Bomme	Denmark	12.88	q
3	6	Elea Jørstad Bock	Norway	12.98	q
4	7	Emma Nwofor	Great Britain & N.I.	13.04	R
5	4	Mira Groot-Romijn	Netherlands	13.13	
6	8	Selina von Jackowski	Switzerland	13.14	
7	5	Klaudia Wojtunik	Poland	13.20	
8	9	Milica Emini	Serbia	13.86	
				Wind: (−1.2 m/s)	

==== Heat 2 ====
Place	Lane	Athlete	Nation	Time	Notes
1	5	Martine Kolbeinshavn Hjørnevik	Norway	12.82	q
2	2	Yanla Ndjip-Nyemeck	Belgium	12.87	q
3	9	Mette Laugesen Kammer	Denmark	12.92	q, SB
4	3	Giada Carmassi	Italy	12.94	q
5	4	Lia Flotow	Germany	12.95	q
6	6	Sarah Lavin	Ireland	13.07	SB
7	7	Karin Strametz	Austria	13.10	
—	8	Ester Bendová	Czech Republic	DNF	
				Wind: (+0.6 m/s)	

==== Heat 3 ====
Place	Lane	Athlete	Nation	Time	Notes
1	8	Rosina Schneider	Germany	12.76	q, PB
2	3	Annika Baun Haldbo	Denmark	12.94	q, PB
3	2	Larissa Bertényi	Switzerland	13.01 [.005]	q
4	6	Elena Carraro	Italy	13.01 [.009]	q
5	7	Anna Tóth	Hungary	13.04	
6	4	Lerato Pagès	Spain	13.09	
7	5	Tereza Elena Šínová	Czech Republic	13.26	
8	9	Lovise Skarbøvik Andresen	Norway	DNF	
				Wind: (+1.8 m/s)	

=== Semi-finals ===
The semi-finals were held on 11 August 2026, at 19:55 in the evening. First 2 in each heat (Q) and the next 2 fastest (q) advanced to the final.

==== Heat 1 ====
Place	Lane	Athlete	Nation	Time	Notes
1	5	Pia Skrzyszowska	Poland	12.60	Q
2	7	Marcia Sey	Great Britain & N.I.	12.77	Q
3	6	Laëticia Bapté	France	12.80	q
4	4	Celeste Polzonetti	Italy	12.93	
5	3	Lia Flotow	Germany	13.02	
6	2	Emma Nwofor	Great Britain & N.I.	13.16	
7	9	Annika Baun Haldbo	Denmark	13.17	
8	8	Lotta Harala	Finland	13.18	
				Wind: (−0.3 m/s)	

==== Heat 2 ====
Place	Lane	Athlete	Nation	Time	Notes
1	5	Luca Kozák	Hungary	12.83	Q
2	3	Yanla Ndjip-Nyemeck	Belgium	12.83	Q
3	4	Sacha Alessandrini	France	12.89	q
4	6	Martine Kolbeinshavn Hjørnevik	Norway	12.97	
5	9	Giada Carmassi	Italy	13.11	
6	2	Mette Laugesen Kammer	Denmark	13.14	
7	8	Larissa Bertényi	Switzerland	13.32	
—	7	Franziska Schuster	Germany	DNF	
				Wind: (−1.2 m/s)	

==== Heat 3 ====
Place	Lane	Athlete	Nation	Time	Notes
1	4	Nadine Visser	Netherlands	12.69	Q
2	6	Ditaji Kambundji	Switzerland	12.94	Q
3	5	Rosina Schneider	Germany	12.96	
4	7	Saara Keskitalo	Finland	13.09	
5	9	Elea Jørstad Bock	Norway	13.10	
6	3	Ida Beiter Bomme	Denmark	13.16	
7	8	Elena Carraro	Italy	13.29	
8	2	Viktória Forster	Slovakia	13.43	
				Wind: (−1.3 m/s)	

=== Final ===
The final was held on 11 August 2026, at 21:30 in the evening.

Place	Lane	Athlete	Nation	Time	Notes
1st place, gold medalist(s)	4	Nadine Visser	Netherlands	12.67 [.668]	
2nd place, silver medalist(s)	5	Pia Skrzyszowska	Poland	12.67 [.669]	
3rd place, bronze medalist(s)	2	Laëticia Bapté	France	12.73	
4	3	Ditaji Kambundji	Switzerland	12.75	
5	7	Luca Kozák	Hungary	12.84	
6	9	Sacha Alessandrini	France	12.92	
7	8	Yanla Ndjip-Nyemeck	Belgium	12.97	
8	6	Marcia Sey	Great Britain & N.I.	13.01	
				Wind: (−0.8 m/s)	
