= 2024 World Athletics Indoor Championships – Women's 60 metres hurdles =

Women's 60 metres hurdles at the 2024 World Athletics Indoor Championships
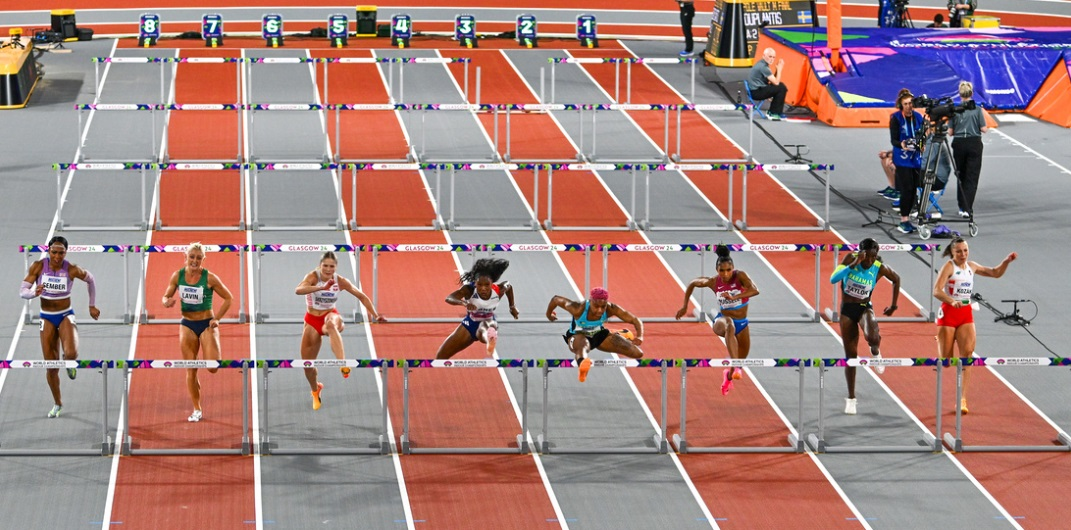
- Venue: Commonwealth Arena
- Dates: 3 March
- Winning time: 7.65 WR

Medalists
gold medal	Devynne Charlton	Bahamas
silver medal	Cyréna Samba-Mayela	France
bronze medal	Pia Skrzyszowska	Poland

The women's 60 metres hurdles at the 2024 World Athletics Indoor Championships took place on 3 March 2024.

== Results ==
=== Heats ===
Qualification: First 3 in each heat (Q) and the next 6 fastest (q) advance to the Semi-Finals

The heats were started at 10:25.

Rank	Heat	Lane	Name	Nationality	Time	Notes
1	2	5	Pia Skrzyszowska	Poland	7.80	Q, SB
2	6	6	Cyréna Samba-Mayela	France	7.81	Q, SB
3	1	5	Nadine Visser	Netherlands	7.85	Q
4	5	4	Masai Russell	United States	7.89	Q
5	6	4	Cindy Sember	Great Britain	7.89	Q, PB
6	4	4	Sarah Lavin	Ireland	7.90	Q, PB
7	3	6	Devynne Charlton	Bahamas	7.93	Q
8	2	8	Solenn Compper	France	7.96	Q, PB
9	2	3	Christina Clemons	United States	7.96	Q
10	4	6	Reetta Hurske	Finland	7.97	Q, SB
11	1	3	Michelle Jenneke	Australia	7.97	Q, SB
12	5	6	Luca Kozák	Hungary	7.98	Q, SB
13	5	5	Mariam Abdul-Rashid	Canada	7.99	Q, PB
14	1	7	Giada Carmassi	Italy	8.03	Q, PB
15	2	4	Karin Strametz	Austria	8.04	q
15	1	4	Nika Glojnarič	Slovenia	8.05	q, PB
17	6	3	Megan Tapper	Jamaica	8.05	Q
18	5	3	Charisma Taylor	Bahamas	8.05	q
19	2	6	Gréta Kerekes	Hungary	8.06	q
20	3	7	Xènia Benach	Spain	8.08	Q
21	6	7	Diana Suumann	Estonia	8.09	q, SB
22	3	5	Mette Graversgaard	Denmark	8.10	Q
23	4	5	Maayke Tjin-A-Lim	Netherlands	8.10	Q
23	3	4	Viktória Forster	Slovakia	8.10	q
25	6	2	Stanislava Škvarková	Slovakia	8.11	SB
26	4	3	Wu Yanni	China	8.12	PB
27	1	6	Masumi Aoki	Japan	8.13	SB
28	3	3	Veronica Besana	Italy	8.15	
29	1	2	Weronika Nagięć	Poland	8.17	
30	2	2	Helena Jiranová	Czech Republic	8.19	
31	4	7	Dafni Georgiou	Cyprus	8.19	SB
32	5	7	Anna Plotitsyna	Ukraine	8.22	
33	6	5	Taylon Bieldt	South Africa	8.25	PB
34	3	2	Elisavet Pesiridou	Greece	8.28	
35	4	8	Vanessa Clerveaux	Haiti	8.29	
36	4	2	Milica Emini	Serbia	8.31	
37	6	8	Shing Cho Yan	Hong Kong	8.45	
38	5	2	Caroline Tomaz	Brazil	8.46	PB
39	2	7	Ketiley Batista	Brazil	8.60	
	1	8	Adrine Monagi	Papua New Guinea	DNF	
	3	8	Yanla Ndjip-Nyemeck	Belgium	DNF	

=== Semifinals ===
First 2 in each heat (Q) and the next 2 fastest (q) advance to the Final.

Rank	Heat	Lane	Name	Nationality	Time	Notes
1	1	5	Devynne Charlton	Bahamas	7.72	Q
2	2	4	Cyréna Samba-Mayela	France	7.73	Q, NR
3	1	6	Pia Skrzyszowska	Poland	7.78	Q, =PB
4	3	6	Masai Russell	United States	7.79	Q, SB
5	2	6	Sarah Lavin	Ireland	7.90	Q, =PB
6	3	1	Charisma Taylor	Bahamas	7.91	Q, =PB
7	1	4	Cindy Sember	Great Britain	7.95	q
8	2	5	Luca Kozák	Hungary	7.95	q, SB
9	2	7	Mariam Abdul-Rashid	Canada	7.99	=PB
10	1	7	Christina Clemons	United States	7.99	
11	3	7	Megan Tapper	Jamaica	8.00	
12	2	3	Reetta Hurske	Finland	8.00	
13	1	1	Karin Strametz	Austria	8.00	PB
14	2	8	Viktória Forster	Slovakia	8.04	SB
15	3	4	Solenn Compper	France	8.04	
16	3	5	Michelle Jenneke	Australia	8.05	
17	2	2	Mette Graversgaard	Denmark	8.07	SB
18	3	8	Gréta Kerekes	Hungary	8.12	
19	1	3	Xènia Benach	Spain	8.12	
20	1	2	Stanislava Škvarková	Slovakia	8.16	
21	2	1	Nika Glojnarič	Slovenia	8.17	
22	1	8	Diana Suumann	Estonia	8.22	
23	3	2	Giada Carmassi	Italy	8.27	
24	3	3	Nadine Visser	Netherlands	8.42	

=== Final ===
The final was started on 3 March at 21:01.

Rank	Lane	Name	Nationality	Time	Notes
1st place, gold medalist(s)	4	Devynne Charlton	Bahamas	7.65	WR
2nd place, silver medalist(s)	5	Cyréna Samba-Mayela	France	7.74	
3rd place, bronze medalist(s)	6	Pia Skrzyszowska	Poland	7.79	
4	3	Masai Russell	United States	7.81	
5	7	Sarah Lavin	Ireland	7.91	
6	2	Charisma Taylor	Bahamas	7.92	
7	8	Cindy Sember	Great Britain	7.92	
8	1	Luca Kozák	Hungary	8.01	
