= Elea Jørstad Bock =

Austrian athlete (born 1998)

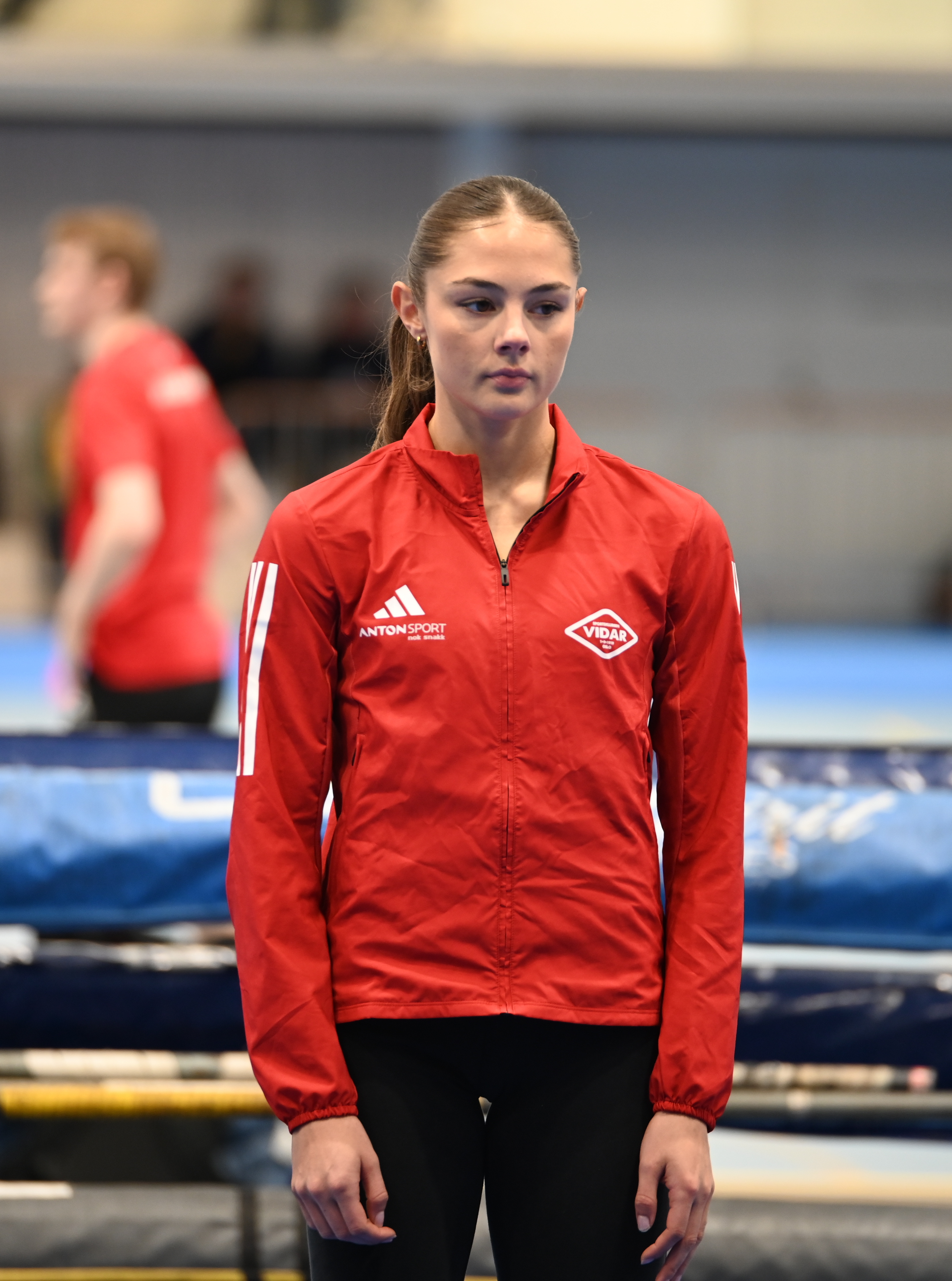

Personal information
- Nationality: Norwegian
- Born: 4 November 2002 (age 23)

Sport
- Sport: Athletics
- Event: Hurdles

Achievements and titles
- Personal bests: 60 m hurdles: 7.95 (Bergen, 2026); 100 m hurdles: 12.95 (Copenhagen, 2026)

Elea Jørstad Bock (born 4 November 2002) is a Norwegian sprint hurdler. She won the 60 metres hurdles at the Norwegian Indoor Athletics Championships in 2025 and 2026.

== Biography ==
From Hammerfest, In 2018, as a 15 year-old, Bock set a new Norwegian age-group record for in the 100 metres hurdles as she ran in a time of 12.56 seconds. That year, due in part to a lack of facilities in Finnmark, she moved to Oslo to attend the Norwegian College of Elite Sport, and continue her focus on athletics.

Bock set a personal best for the 100 metres hurdles of 13.89 seconds as a 19 year-old in 2021, competing in Mannheim, Germany. In July of that year, Bock was selected as part of Norway's squad for 2021 European Athletics U20 Championships in Tallinn, Estonia.

Bock is a member of SK Vidar, and in 2023 was part of a Norwegian national record setting relay team alongside Line Kloster, Laura Tangen and Ingrid Pernille Rismark.

Bock won the 60 metres hurdles at the Norwegian Indoor Athletics Championships in 2025 in Bærum. That year, she won the national 100 metres hurdles race at the 2025 Bislett Games.

Bock was runner-up in the 60m hurdles to Ida Beiter Bomme at the Nordenkampen in Karlstad in 7.99 seconds. The time met the automatic qualifying standard for the upcoming World Indoors. She also ran 7.61 seconds for the 60 metres that weekend. Bock set a personal best of 7.95 seconds for the 60m hurdles at the 2026 Norwegian Indoor Athletics Championships in Bergen in 2026. She later won the 60 metres hurdles title, running 8.05 seconds in the final to win ahead of Martine Hjørnevik. She was selected for the 2026 World Athletics Indoor Championships in Toruń, Poland. In August 2026, she competed at the 2026 European Athletics Championships in Birmingham, England, in the women's 100 metres hurdles, reaching the semi-finals.
