= Celeste Polzonetti =

Italian hurdler (born 2005)

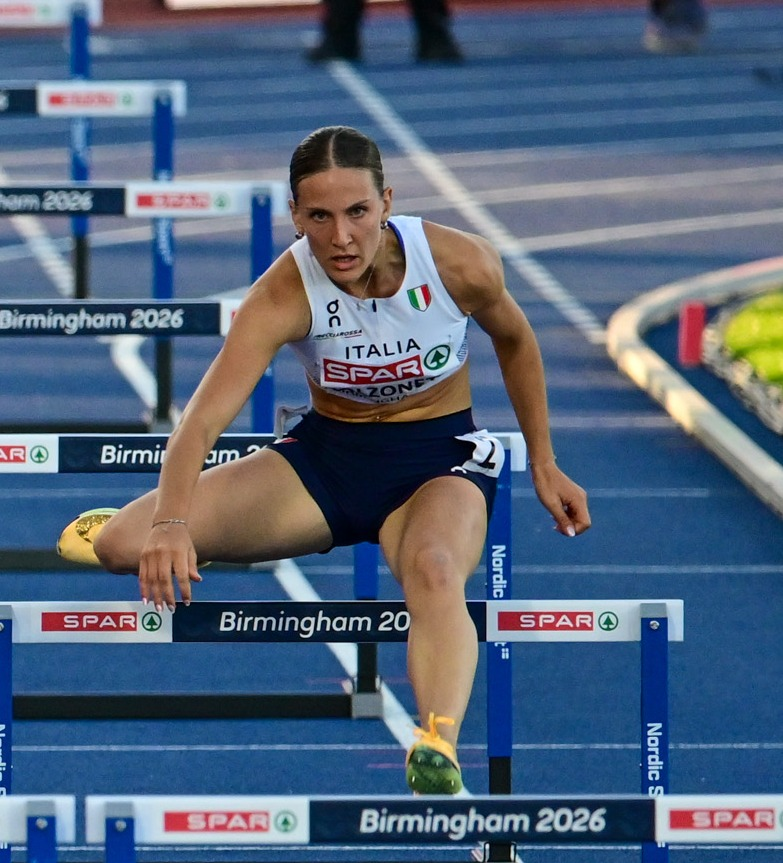

Personal information
- Born: 26 December 2005 (age 20) Desio, Italy

Sport
- Sport: Athletics
- Event: High hurdles
- Club: Bracco Atletica; UCLA Bruins

Achievements and titles
- Personal bests: 60 m hs: 8.14 (2026); 100 m hs: 12.74 (2026)
Medal record
Women's athletics
Representing Italy
Mediterranean Games
Gold medal – first place	2026 Taranto	100 m hurdles

Celeste Polzonetti (born 26 December 2005) is an Italian high hurdler. In 2026, she moved to second on the Italian all-time list for the 100 metres hurdles.

== Career ==
From Desio, Brianza, and a member of Bracco Atletica, she trained alongside Erika Saraceni under Aldo Maggi. She won Italian junior 60m hurdles and the junior 100m hurdles titles in 2023. Polzonetti competed for Italy at the 2023 European Athletics U20 Championships in Jerusalem, at the age of 18 years-old. Competing in the 100m hurdles, she qualified for the final, and placed fourth overall in 13.36 seconds (+0.5m/s).

In February 2024, she won the Italian junior 60m hurdles title with a personal best, lowering it from 8.47 seconds to a 8.34, then to 8.32 in the final, to move to third on the Italian all time under-20 list. She was a semi-finalist in the 100m hurdles at the 2024 World Athletics U20 Championships in Lima, Peru in August 2024.

In 2025, Polzonetti ran a new personal best of 12.98 (+1.3m/s) for the 100m hurdles in Los Angeles. That summer, she won the Italian U23 100m hurdles title. She was a semi-finalist in the 100m hurdles at the 2025 European Athletics U23 Championships in Bergen, Norway. She placed third at the senior Italian Athletics Championships in August 2025.

Competing for the University of California, Los Angeles (UCLA) in the United States, Polzonetti ran a personal best of 12.74 seconds in the 2026 NCAA Outdoor Championships 100 metres hurdles semi-finals on 11 June, to move to second on the Italian all-time list, behind only Giada Carmassi. In the final on 13 June, she initially finished in third place behind Aaliyah McCormick and Emmi Scales in 12.78 seconds but was later promoted to second when Scales was disqualified for falling into Polzonetti's lane after tripping over the final hurdle. In August 2026, she competed at the 2026 European Athletics Championships in Birmingham, England, in the women's 100 metres hurdles, reaching the semi-finals.

== Achievements ==
Year	Competition	Venue	Rank	Event	Time	Notes
2026	European Championships	(United Kingdom) Birmingham	Semifinal	100 m hs	12.93	(Note: He ran the heat with a best time: 12.80)

== National titles ==
She has won a national titles at individual senior level.

- Italian Athletics Championships
  - 100 m hs: 2026

== See also ==
- Italian all-time lists - 100 metres hurdles
