= Emma Nwofor =

British sprinter (born 1996)

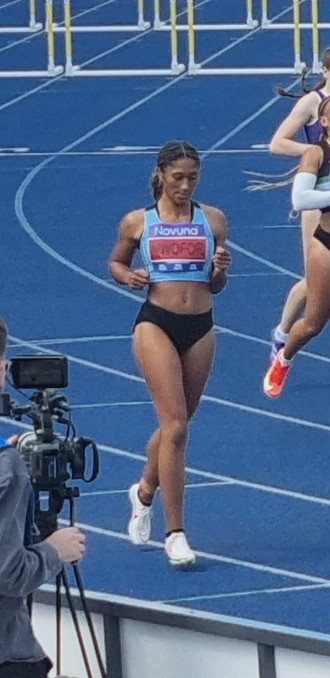
- 2025 UK Athletics Championships

Personal information
- Born: 22 August 1996 (age 29)

Sport
- Sport: Athletics
- Events: Heptathlon, Hurdles

Achievements and titles
- Personal bests: 60m: 7.79 (Manchester, 2022); 100m: 12.28 (Tucson, 2021); 200m: 24.95 (Champaign, 2021); 60m hurdles: 8.04 (Toruń, 2026); 100m hurdles 12.86 (Gainesville, 2026); Heptathlon: 5685 (Champaign, 2021); Pentathlon: 4113 (Geneva, 2020)

Emma Nwofor (born 22 August 1996) is a British multi-event athlete and was the champion of heptathlon at the 2018 British Athletics Championships, before later focusing on high hurdles and represented Great Britain at the 2026 World Athletics Indoor Championships.

Nwofor finished runner-up at the 2026 UK Championships in the 100 metres hurdles, and at the 2025 and 2026 British Indoor Championships over 60 metres hurdles.

== Biography ==
In January 2018, she was selected to represent Great Britain in the pentathlon at the Indoor Combined Events International in Madrid, placing ninth overall. Competing for Brunel University London she won three medals at the British Universities and Colleges Sport (BUCS) indoor national athletics championships in Sheffield in 2018; gold in the 60 metres hurdles and high jump, and bronze in the long jump. She won the heptathlon title at the 2018 British Athletics Championships held as part of the England Combined Events Championships in Bedford in 2018.

After which, in the following year she began to compete for Arkansas State University in the United States, where she won the 60m hurdles at the Sun Belt Indoor Championships in February 2019, as well as having a second place finish in the heptathlon at the championships. In 2020, she competed at the Big Ten Indoor Championships; placing second in the high jump, third in the pentathlon, and winning the 60 metres hurdles.

A member of Newham and Essex Beagles, she made her senior international debut in the women's 60m hurdles at the 2021 European Athletics Indoor Championships in Poland, where she ran a time of 8.24 seconds in her heat.

She finished second at the 2025 British Indoor Athletics Championships in Birmingham over the 60 metres hurdles in February 2025, running a time of 8.11 seconds, to finish 0.02 seconds behind race winner Abigail Pawlett. She lowered her personal best for the 100 metres hurdles to 12.87 seconds in London in June 2025. On 2 August, she qualified for the final of the 100 metres hurdles at the 2025 UK Athletics Championships in Birmingham but was one of four athletes who failed to finish.

On 14 February 2026, Nwofor finished runner-up to Abigail Pawlett in the 60 metres hurdles at the 2026 British Indoor Athletics Championships in Birmingham, running 8.14 seconds in the final. She was named in the British squad for the 60 metres hurdles at the 2026 World Athletics Indoor Championships in Toruń, Poland, where she ran a personal best of 8.04 seconds. In May, she won over 100m hurdles at the Canarias Athletics Invitational in Tenerife. On 20 June, Nwofor was runner-up to Marcia Sey in 12.90 seconds in the final of the 2026 UK Athletics Championships. She competed in the 100 metres hurdles at the 2026 Commonwealth Games in Glasgow, Scotland. In August 2026, she competed at the 2026 European Athletics Championships in Birmingham, England, in the women's 100 metres hurdles, reaching the semi-finals.

== Personal life ==
She is from London.
