= Emmi Scales =

American hurdler (born 2004)

Personal information
- Born: 2004 (age 21–22)

Sport
- Sport: Athletics
- Event: Hurdles

Achievements and titles
- Personal bests: 60mH: 7.83 (2026); 100mH: 12.64 (Auburn, 2026)

Emmi Scales (born 2004) is an American high hurdler who competes for the University of Kentucky.

== Early and personal life ==
From Arlington Heights, Illinois, Scales attended St. Viator High School. From an athletic family, her mother, Anna, was a track athlete in high school and her father played basketball. Her brother, PJ, plays as a wide receiver at Johns Hopkins University. Scales was active in competitive cheerleading as her middle school in Roselle did not have a track team, and she only later became involved in athletics. She was named East Suburban Catholic Conference track athlete of the year in 2022. That year, she set a 7.72 seconds personal best in the 60 meters and 8.72 for the 60 metres hurdles at the 2022 Adidas Track National Championships, where she placed in the top five of both events. She then had a dominant outdoor season in 2022, going unbeaten over 300 m hurdles and only losing one race in the 100 metres hurdles. She signed that year for the University of Kentucky.

== Career ==
Competing for the University of Kentucky, Scales set a personal best in the women’s 60m hurdles event with a time of 7.83 seconds at the Tiger Paw Invitational on 13 February 2026. That month, she won the women's 60 hurdles in 7.85 seconds at the 2026 SEC Indoor Championships. Scales qualified for the 2026 NCAA Division I Indoor Track and Field Championships, and went into the championships unbeaten across the indoor season against other college athletes. She placed fifth in the final in 7.95 seconds. She finished the 2026 indoor season tied for eighth worldwide due to her best time of 7.83 seconds, and third American behind Alia Armstrong and Christina Clemons.

On 18 April 2026, Scales ran a personal best 12.88 (+1.0) for the 100 metres hurdles in Gainesville, Florida, lowering it to 12.86 (+0.5) the following month in Lexington. In May, she ran 12.64 seconds (+0.4) to win the 100 m hurdles at the SEC Championships, and was the fastest qualifier at the East Regionals with 12.69 seconds. Scales ran 12.72 seconds to win her 2026 NCAA Outdoor Championships 100 metres hurdles semi-final on 11 June, ahead of Italian Celeste Polzonetti. In the final on 13 June, Scales initially finished in second place behind Aaliyah McCormick in a time of 12.69 seconds but was later disqualified for falling into Polzonetti's lane after tripping over the final hurdle.
