= Lia Flotow =

German athlete (born 2004)

Personal information
- Born: 19 August 2004 (age 22)

Sport
- Country: Germany
- Sport: Athletics
- Event: Hurdles

Achievements and titles
- Personal bests: 60 m hurdles 8.09 (2026); 100 m hurdles: 13.01 (2025)
Medal record
Women's athletics
Representing Germany
European U20 Championships
Bronze medal – third place	2023 Jerusalem	100 m hurdles

Lia Flotow (born 19 August 2004) is a German sprint hurdler. She placed third over 100 metres hurdles at the 2023 European U20 Championships and 2025 German Championships.

== Biography ==
From Rostock, Flotow is a member of 1. LAV Rostock, where she is coached by Birger Voigt.

Flotow was runner-up in the heptathlon at the German U20 Championships in 2022. That year, she ran 13.54 seconds at the German Youth Championships in Ulm for the 100 metres hurdles, and began to focus more on hurdles than the combined events. She won the Junior Gala in Mannheim over 100 metres hurdles in June 2023, running 13.12 seconds, and beating the personal best she set the week prior, of 13.46 seconds. She was the bronze medalist at the 2023 European Athletics U20 Championships in Jerusalem, Israel, in the 100 metres hurdles, with compatriot Rosina Schneider claiming the gold medal in the race.

After missing the vast majority of the indoor season in 2024, Flotow returned to she won the North German Championships in June 2024 in Rostock, running 13.31 seconds. Later that month, ran a personal best 13.09 seconds for the 100 metres hurdles as she placed fourth overall at the senior German Athletics Championships in Braunschweig.

In January 2025, Flotow ran a personal best 8.19 seconds for the 60 metres hurdles to win the 26th International Indoor Meeting in Chemnitz. At the International Indoor Meeting in Erfurt the following month, she ran the 60m hurdles in 8.18 seconds, a new best. That summer, she made steady improvements to her time for the 100 metres hurdles. In June, Flotow lowered her personal best to 13.05 seconds and then 13.03 seconds. Flotow placed third in the 100 metres hurdles at the German Athletics Championships in August 2025, running 13.02 seconds in Dresden. In August, she lowered her best again to 13.01 seconds in Sondershausen. In August 2026, she competed at the 2026 European Athletics Championships in Birmingham, England, in the women's 100 metres hurdles, reaching the semi-finals.
