= Sarah Lavin =

Irish hurdler (born 1994)

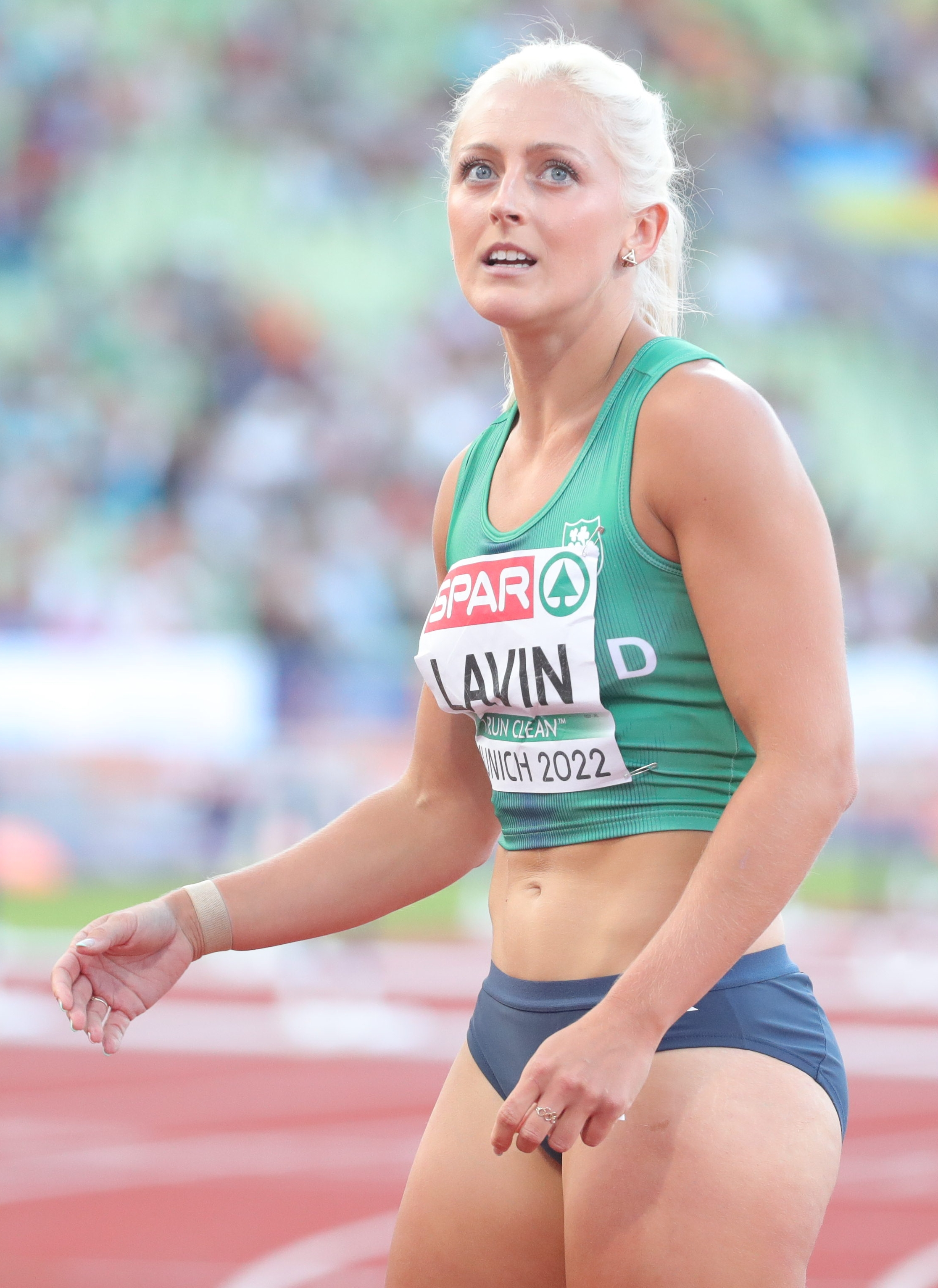
- Lavin in 2022

Personal information
- Full name: Sarah Kate Lavin
- Born: 28 May 1994 (age 32) Lisnagry, Limerick, Ireland
- Education: University College Dublin

Sport
- Sport: Athletics
- Events: 100 m hurdles, 60 m hurdles
Medal record
Women's athletics
Representing Ireland
European Games
Bronze medal – third place	2023 Kraków-Małopolska	100 m hurdles

Sarah Kate Lavin (born 28 May 1994) is an Irish athlete specialising in the high hurdles. She finished fourth at the 2019 Summer Universiade. In addition, she won a silver medal at the 2013 European Junior Championships and represented Ireland at the 2020 Summer Games. Lavin competed in the 2024 Paris Olympics, where she made it to the semi finals of the 100m hurdles.

Her personal bests are 12.62 seconds in the 100 metres hurdles (the Irish national record) (+0.5 m/s, Budapest 2023) and 7.90 60 metres hurdles (Glasgow 2024).

With a time of 11.27 seconds, Lavin was the previous Irish recordholder in the 100 metres flat (Switzerland 2023).

== International competitions ==
Year	Competition	Venue	Position	Event	Notes
Representing Ireland
2012	World Junior Championships	Barcelona, Spain	18th (h)	100 m hurdles	13.90^{1}
2013	European Junior Championships	Rieti, Italy	2nd	100 m hurdles	13.34
2014	European Championships	Zürich, Switzerland	29th (h)	100 m hurdles	13.25
2014	European Championships	Zürich, Switzerland	10th (h)	4 × 100 m relay	43.84
2015	World Relays	Nassau, Bahamas	5th	4 × 200 m relay	1:36.90
2015	European U23 Championships	Tallinn, Estonia	17th (h)	100 m hurdles	13.87
2015	European U23 Championships	Tallinn, Estonia	5th (h)	4 × 100 m relay	44.68^{2}
2017	Universiade	Taipei, Taiwan	9th (sf)	100 m hurdles	13.64
2019	Universiade	Naples, Italy	4th	100 m hurdles	13.28
2021	European Indoor Championships	Toruń, Poland	9th (sf)	60 m hurdles	8.07
2021	World Relays	Chorzów, Poland	10th (h)	4 × 100 m relay	44.53
2021	Olympic Games	Tokyo, Japan	32nd (h)	100 m hurdles	13.16
2022	World Indoor Championships	Belgrade, Serbia	7th	60 m hurdles	8.09
2022	World Championships	Eugene, United States	17th (sf)	100 m hurdles	12.87
2022	European Championships	Munich, Germany	5th	100 m hurdles	12.86
2023	European Indoor Championships	Istanbul, Turkey	6th	60 m hurdles	8.03
2023	World Championships	Budapest, Hungary	11th (sf)	100 m hurdles	12.62
2024	World Indoor Championships	Glasgow, United Kingdom	5th	60 m hurdles	7.91
2024	European Championships	Rome, Italy	7th	100 m hurdles	12.94
2024	Olympic Games	Paris, France	15th (sf)	100 m hurdles	12.69
2025	European Indoor Championships	Apeldoorn, Netherlands	4th	60 m hurdles	7.92
2025	World Indoor Championships	Nanjing, China	17th (sf)	60 m hurdles	8.14
2025	World Championships	Tokyo, Japan	13th (sf)	100 m hurdles	12.86
2026	World Indoor Championships	Toruń, Poland	32nd (h)	60 m hurdles	8.08
2026	European Championships	Birmingham, United Kingdom	15th (h)	100 m hurdles	13.07

^{1}Did not finish in the semifinals
^{2}Did not finish in the final

== Personal life ==
Lavin was in a relationship with rally driver Craig Breen, until his death in a rallying accident in April 2023.
