= Mira Groot-Romijn =

Dutch hurdler

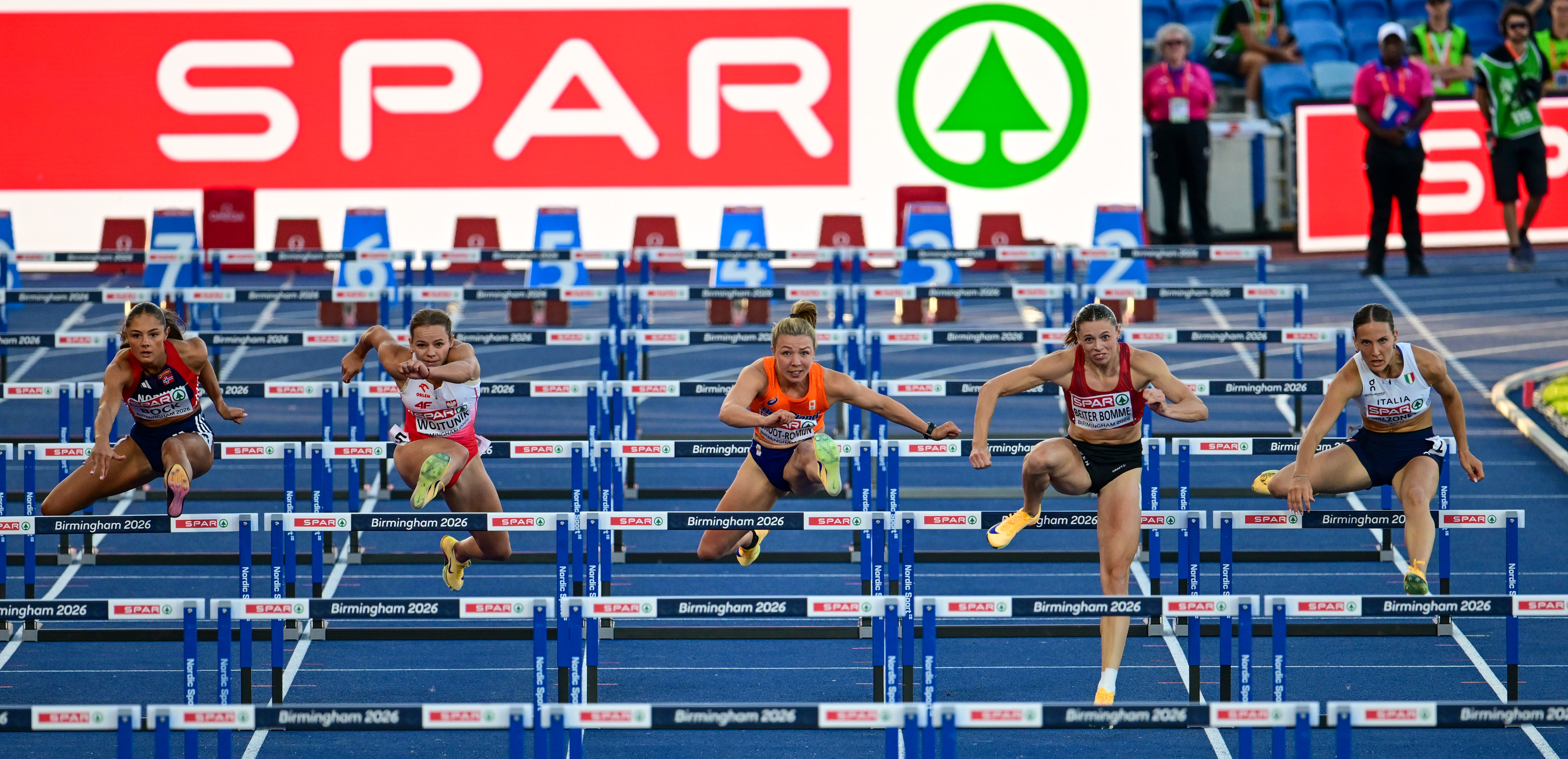
- Competing at the 2026 European Championships

Personal information
- Born: 8 March 1995 (age 31)

Sport
- Sport: Athletics
- Event: Hurdles

Achievements and titles
- Personal bests: 60mH: 7.99 (2026); 100mH: 12.91 (2025)

Mira Groot-Romijn (née Groot; born 8 March 1995) is a Dutch hurdler. She has multiple podium appearances at the Dutch Athletics Championships in the 60 metres hurdles and 100 metres hurdles.

== Biography ==
From The Hague, she is a member of HAAG Athletics. Groot placed third over 60 metres hurdles at the 2025 Dutch Indoor Championships, and placed second to Maayke Tjin A-Lim in the 100 metres hurdles in a personal best 12.91 seconds at the 2025 Dutch Championships in Hengelo.

On 1 March 2026, she placed third to Nadine Visser and Tjin A-Lim at the Dutch Indoor Championships, running 7.99 seconds in both the semi-final and the final. On 26 July, she finished runner-up to Visser in the 100 metres hurdles final at the 2026 Dutch Outdoor Championships. In August 2026, she competed at the 2026 European Athletics Championships in Birmingham, England, in the women's 100 metres hurdles.
