= Martine Hjørnevik =

Austrian athlete (born 1998)

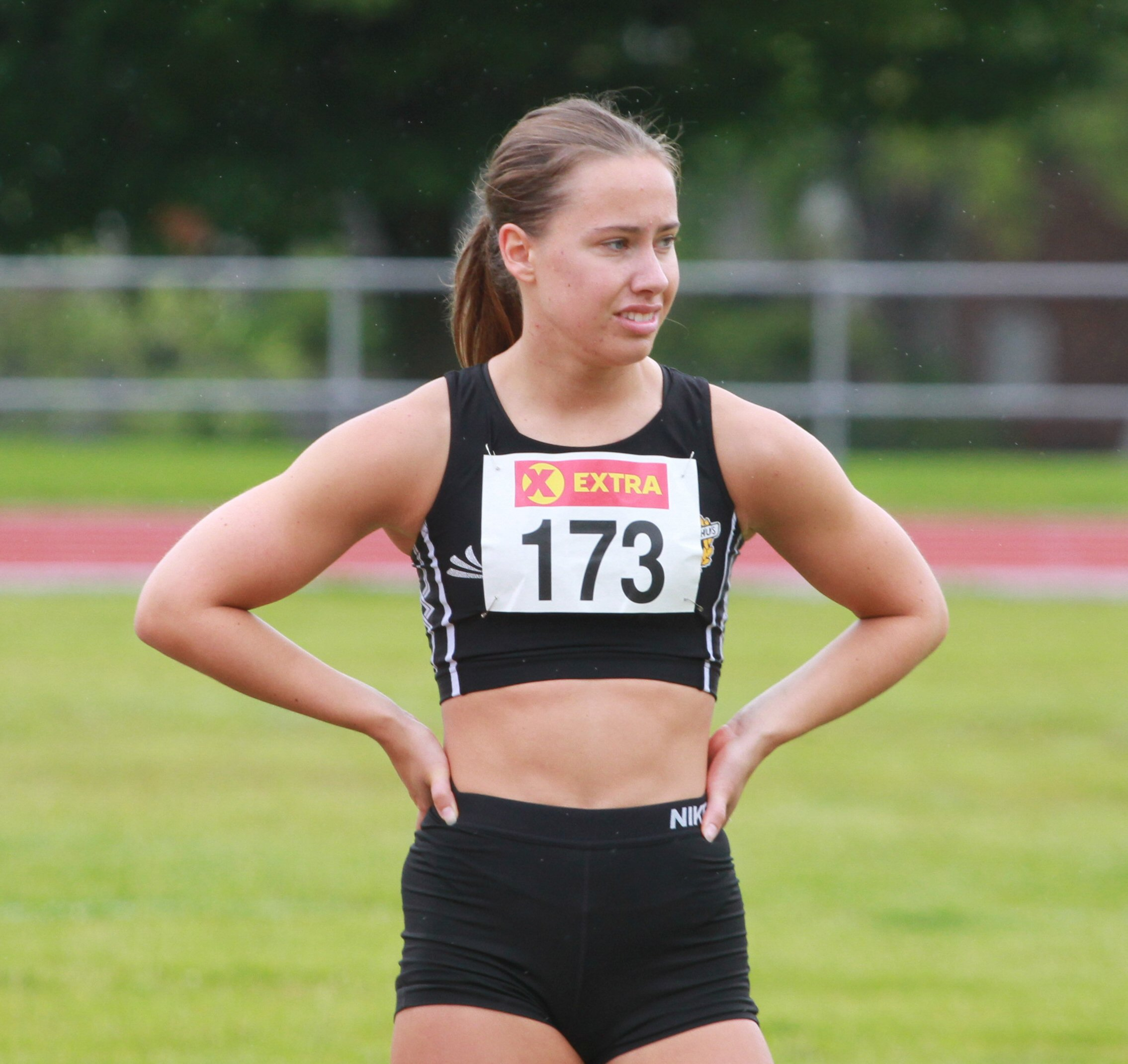
- Martine Hjørnevik

Personal information
- Nationality: Norwegian
- Born: Martine Kolbeinshavn Hjørnevik; 18 February 2001 (age 25)

Sport
- Sport: Athletics
- Event: Hurdles

Achievements and titles
- Personal bests: 60 m hurdles: 7.95 (Toruń, 2026); 100 m hurdles: 12.74 (Copenhagen, 2026)
Medal record
Women's athletics
Representing Norway
European U18 Championships
Gold medal – first place	2018 Gyor	100 m hurdles
European Youth Olympic Festival
Silver medal – second place	2017 Győr	100 m hurdles

Martine Kolbeinshavn Hjørnevik (born 18 February 2001) is a Norwegian sprint hurdler. She has won Norwegian national titles over 100 metres hurdles and 60 metres hurdles, She was the 2018 European under-18 champion.

== Biography ==
From Bergen, and a member of IL Norna-Salhus, Hjørnevik excelled in athletics from a young age. At the 2016 Norwegian Youth Athletics Championships, she won the 100 metres and 80 metres hurdles.

Competing at the 2017 European Youth Olympic Festival, she won the silver medal in the 100 metres hurdles, behind Zoë Sedney of the Netherlands. As a 16 year-old in February 2018, Hjørnevik won the 60 metres hurdles at the senior Norwegian Indoor Athletics Championships, in her first race over senior hurdlers. She won in 8.36 seconds, to take the U18 world lead. That year, she won the 100 metres hurdles at the 2018 European Athletics U18 Championships in Győr, Hungary ahead of Sedney.

Hjørnevik was a finalist in the 100 metres hurdles at the 2019 European Athletics U20 Championships. She lowered her personal best by three hundredths in her heat with a time of 13.64, before running 13.60 seconds in the final to place sixth. She later also represented Norway at the 2023 European Athletics U23 Championships in Espoo.

Hjørnevik was runner-up to Elea Jørstad Bock in the 60 metres hurdles at the 2025 Norwegian Indoor Athletics Championships in Bærum. In August 2025, she won the 100 metres hurdles with a time of 13.10 seconds at the 2025 Norwegian Athletics Championships.

Hjørnevik set a new personal best of 8.11 seconds for the 60m hurdles on 1 February 2026, before lowering it to 7.96 seconds the following week to go under the automatic standard for the World Indoors. Hjørnevik was runner-up to Elea Jørstad Bock in the 60 metres hurdles at the 2026 Norwegian Indoor Athletics Championships in Bergen. She ran a personal best 7.95 seconds to reach the semi-finals of the 60 metres hurdles at the 2026 World Athletics Indoor Championships in Toruń, Poland. In May, she won the 100 metres hurdles at the Trond Mohn Games in Bergen, running 13.14 seconds. On 22 June, she set a new personal best in the 100 metres hurdles with 12.74 seconds in Copenhagen. In August 2026, she competed at the 2026 European Athletics Championships in Birmingham, England, in the women's 100 metres hurdles, reaching the semi-finals.
