= Annika Baun Haldbo =

Danish sprinter (born 2023)

Personal information
- Nationality: Danish
- Born: 28 July 2003 (age 23)
- Height: 1.75 m (5 ft 9 in)

Sport
- Sport: Track and Field
- Event: Hurdles

Achievements and titles
- Personal bests: 60m hurdles: 8.15 (2025); 100m hurdles: 12.94 (2026)

Annika Baun Haldbo (born 28 July 2003) is a Danish high hurdler. She represented Denmark in the 60 metres hurdles at the 2025 World Athletics Indoor Championships.

== Biography ==
A member of Sparta Athletics club, she set a new Danish under-18 record for the 60 metres hurdles, with 8.62 seconds in Copenhagen in February 2021. In June 2022, she placed third overall in the 100 metres hurdles at the Danish Athletics Championships, running a personal best 13.81 seconds to improve the Danish under-20 record previously set by Anne K. Andersen in 2001. Competing at the 2023 European Athletics U23 Championships in Espoo, Finland in July 2023, she competed in the 100 metres hurdles, and ran 13.62 seconds (+1.7) to improve her personal best by 0.19 seconds, which moves her to a share of fifth place on the Danish all-time list.

She finished third over 100 metres hurdles at the 2024 Danish Athletics Championships in June 2024 in 13.55 seconds. She improved her personal best to 8.15 seconds for the 60 metres hurdles whilst competing at the Aarhus Sprint'n'Jump event in January 2025. She was runner-up to Ida Beiter Bomme over 60 metres hurdles at the 2025 Danish Indoor Athletics Championships in February 2025, running 8.18 seconds. She made her global event debut competing in the 60 metres hurdles at the 2025 World Athletics Indoor Championships in Nanjing, without advancing to the semi-finals.

In February 2026, she placed fourth over 60 m at the Danish Indoor Championships. In May, she ran a personal best for the 100 metres hurdles at the Irena Szewińska Memorial in Bydgoszcz, Poland, with 13.11 seconds. In August 2026, she competed at the 2026 European Athletics Championships in Birmingham, England, in the women's 100 metres hurdles, reaching the semi-finals. She also competed in the women's 4 × 100 metres relay at the championships.
