= Viktória Forster =

Slovak athlete (born 2002)

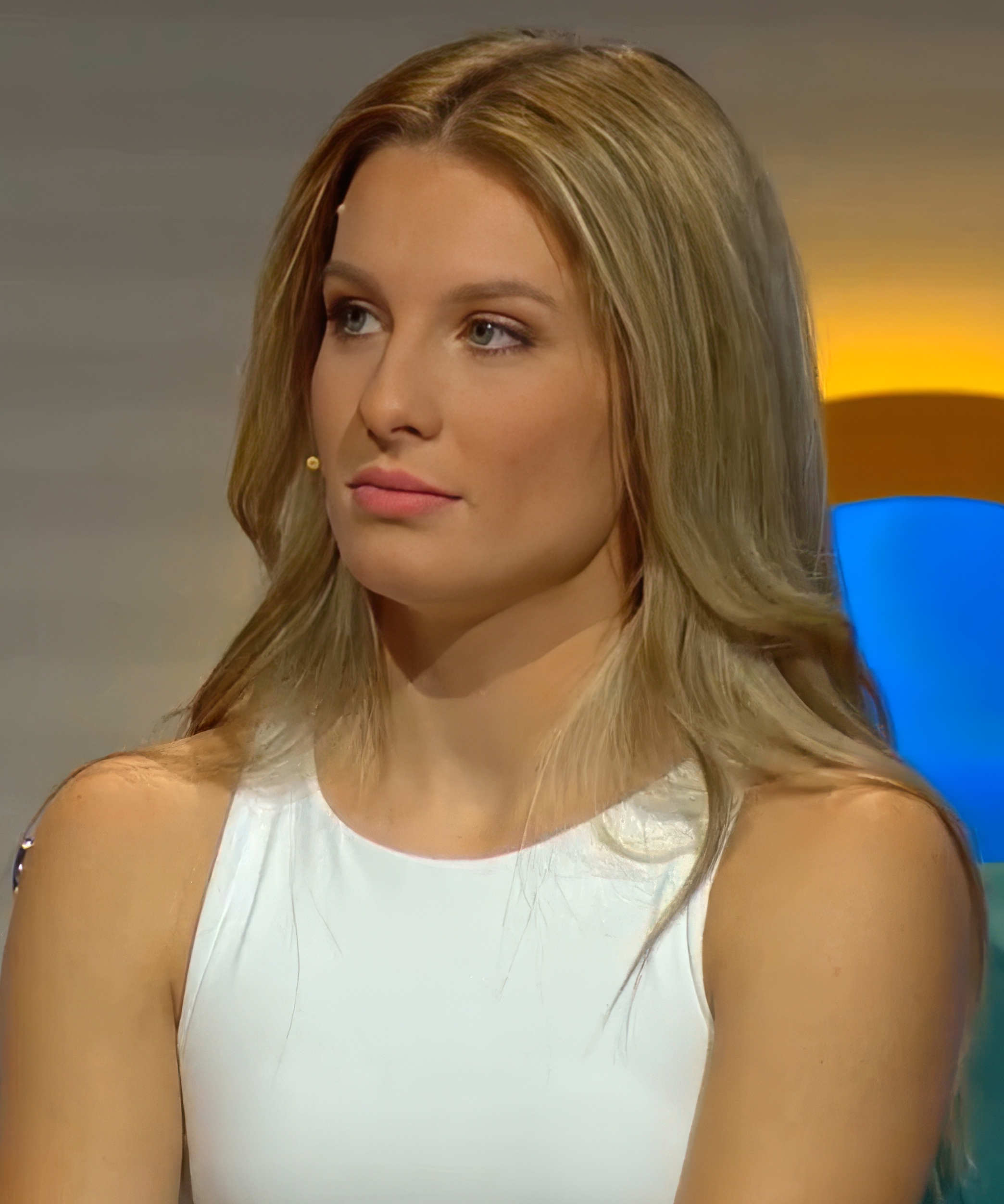

Personal information
- Nationality: Slovak
- Born: 8 April 2002 (age 24) Hronec, Slovakia
- Height: 162 cm (5 ft 4 in)
- Weight: 48 kg (106 lb)

Sport
- Sport: Track and Field
- Events: Sprint, hurdles
- Club: VŠC Dukla Banská Bystrica
- Coached by: Katarína Adlerová

Achievements and titles
- Personal bests: 100m: 11.24 (2023, NR); 60m hurdles: 8.03 (2023, NR); 100m hurdles: 12.72 (2023, NR)
Medal record
Women's athletics
Representing Slovakia
World University Games
Gold medal – first place	2023 Chengdu	100 m hurdles
Silver medal – second place	2023 Chengdu	100 m

Viktória Forster (born 8 April 2002) is a Slovak track and field athlete who competes internationally as a hurdler and a sprinter. She holds the Slovak women's record for 60 metres hurdles, 100 metres hurdles and 100 metres.

== Biography ==
Forster was born on 8 April 2002 in the village of Hronec, close to the town of Brezno. Originally, she competed in biathlon following the example of her mother, but switched to athletics at the age of 13. She studied at the Constantine the Philosopher University in Nitra but suspended her studies to focus on preparation for the 2024 Olympics. Her athletic idol is the Jamaican sprinter Shelly-Ann Fraser-Pryce.

== Career ==
At the indoors Slovak championships in Bratislava, Forster achieved a new Slovak women's record 60 meter hurdle run 8.03, beating the 8.04 time achieved by Miriam Bobková in 2008.

In early 2023, she achieved two Slovak women's records in 100 meters hurdle run, first at Nyíregyháza and later at Golden Spike Ostrava. Wanting to capitalize on her form, she competed solely in this discipline at the 2023 European Athletics U23 Championships in Espoo. Nonetheless she failed to qualify for the semi-finals after tripping at the eight hurdle. At the 2023 P-T-S athletic meeting in Banská Bystrica she ran 100 meters in 11.26, beating the 11.29 national women's record achieved by Eva Glesková at the 1968 Summer Olympics.

At the 2021 Summer World University Games Forster won the 100 meters hurdle race with the time 12.72, making a new Slovak record, beating her own record of 12.82 from Golden Spike Ostrava. She also classified for the 2024 Summer Olympics by clearing the 12.77 threshold. Additionally, she finished second in 100 meters race with the time 11.34.

At the 2023 World Athletics Championships Forster struggled in 100 m hurdles, failing to advance to semi-finals with the time 13.47. Viktória Forster runs for VŠC Dukla Banská Bystrica.

== Competition record ==
Year	Competition	Venue	Position	Event	Notes
Representing Slovakia
2018	Youth Olympic Games	Buenos Aires	14h	200 m	24.86
2019	European Youth Olympic Festival	Baku	6th	100 m	11.96
2019	European Youth Olympic Festival	Baku	4th	200 m	24.47
2021	World U20 Championships	Nairobi	6th	100 m	11.54
2021	World U20 Championships	Nairobi		200 m	DNS
2021	World U20 Championships	Nairobi	6th	100 m hurdles	DQ in the finals
2022	World Indoor Championships	Belgrade	31st	60 m	7.35
2022	World Indoor Championships	Belgrade	24th	60 m hurdles	8.22
2022	European Championships	Munich	23rd	100 m	11.72
2022	European Championships	Munich	23rd	100 m hurdles	13.50
2023	European Indoor Championships	Istanbul	32nd	60 m	7.51
2023	European Indoor Championships	Istanbul	26th	60 m hurdles	8.24
2023	European U23 Championships	Espoo	22nd	100 m hurdles	13.69
2023	European U23 Championships	Espoo	7th	4 × 100 m relay	45.06
2023	World University Games	Chengdu	2nd	100 m	11.34
2023	World University Games	Chengdu	1st	100 m hurdles	12.72
2023	World Championships	Budapest	40th (h)	100 m hurdles	13.47
2024	World Indoor Championships	Glasgow, United Kingdom	37th (h)	60 m	7.35
2024	World Indoor Championships	Glasgow, United Kingdom	14th (sf)	60 m hurdles	8.04
2024	European Championships	Rome, Italy	16th (h)	100 m	11.50
2024	European Championships	Rome, Italy	8th	100 m hurdles	13.25
2024	Olympic Games	Paris, France	6th (h)	100 m	11.44
2024	Olympic Games	Paris, France	7th (rep)	100 m hurdles	12.88
2025	European Indoor Championships	Apeldoorn, Netherlands	22nd (sf)	60 m	7.28
2025	European Indoor Championships	Apeldoorn, Netherlands	22nd (h)	60 m hurdles	8.11
2025	World Indoor Championships	Nanjing, China	31st (h)	60 m	7.39
2025	World Indoor Championships	Nanjing, China	31st (h)	60 m hurdles	8.26
2025	World Championships	Tokyo, Japan	39th (h)	100 m	11.43
2025	World Championships	Tokyo, Japan	34th (h)	100 m hurdles	13.18
2026	European Championships	Birmingham, United Kingdom	20th (h)	100 m	11.51
2026	European Championships	Birmingham, United Kingdom	23rd (sf)	100 m hurdles	13.43
2026	European Championships	Birmingham, United Kingdom	13th (h)	4 × 100 m relay	44.20
