= Cyréna Samba-Mayela =

French athlete (born 2000)

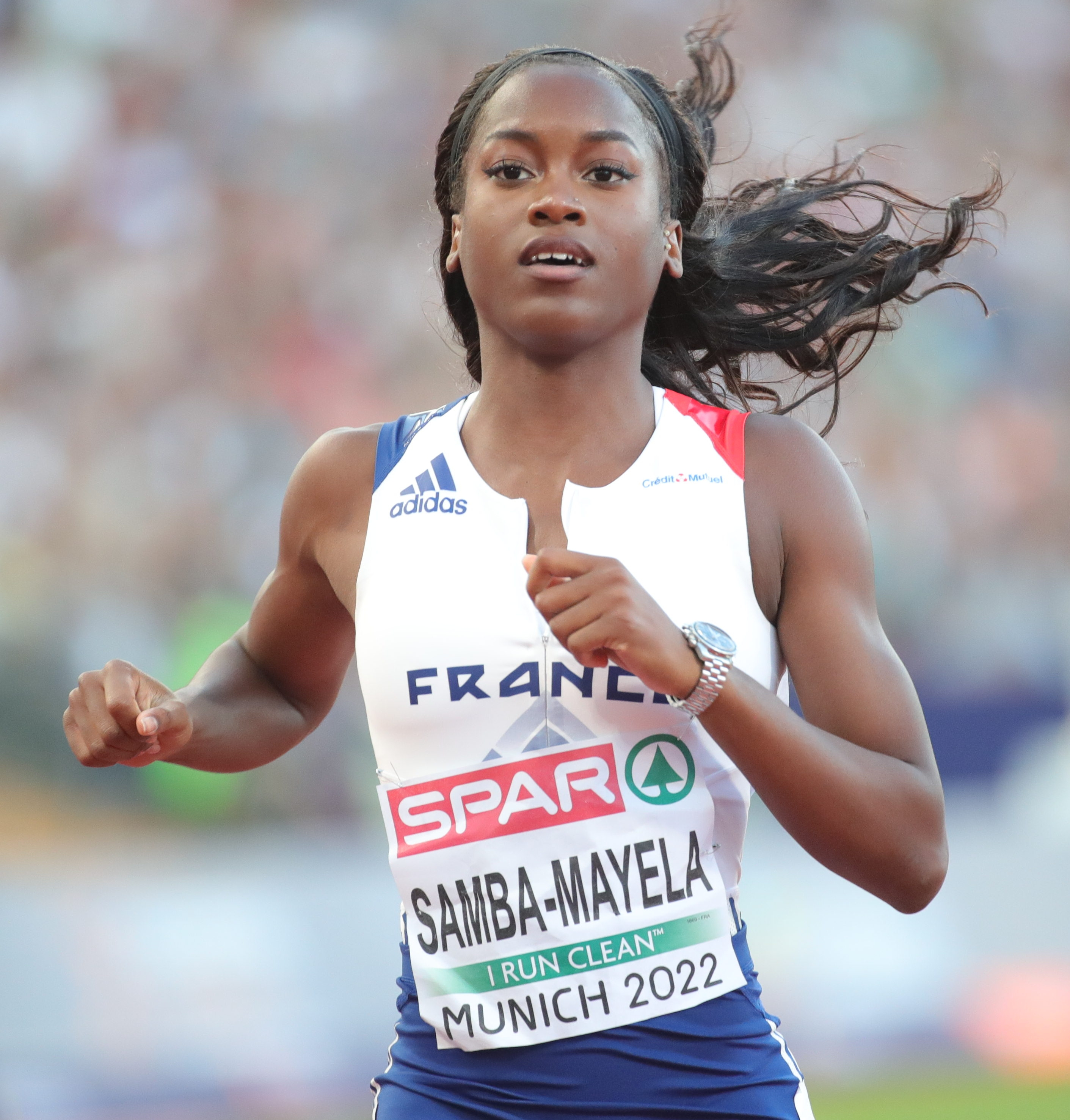
- Samba-Mayela in 2022

Personal information
- Born: 31 October 2000 (age 25) Champigny-sur-Marne, France
- Height: 166 cm (5 ft 5 in)
- Weight: 57 kg (126 lb)

Sport
- Country: France
- Sport: Athletics
- Events: 60 m hurdles 100 m hurdles
- Coached by: Teddy Tamgho (2019–)

Achievements and titles
- Personal bests: 100 m hurdles: 12.31 NR (2024); 100 m: 11.73 (2017); Indoors; 60 m hurdles: 7.73i NR (2024); 60 m: 7.30i (2020)
Medal record
Women's athletics
Representing France
Olympic Games
Silver medal – second place	2024 Paris	100 m hurdles
World Indoor Championships
Gold medal – first place	2022 Belgrade	60 m hurdles
Silver medal – second place	2024 Glasgow	60 m hurdles
European Championships
Gold medal – first place	2024 Rome	100 m hurdles
European U23 Championships
Silver medal – second place	2021 Tallinn	100 m hurdles
World U18 Championships
Silver medal – second place	2017 Nairobi	100 m hurdles
European U18 Championships
Gold medal – first place	2016 Tbilisi	Medley relay

Cyréna Samba-Mayela (born 31 October 2000) is a French athlete who competes in the 60 metres hurdles and 100 metres hurdles. At the 2024 Summer Olympics, Samba-Mayela won the silver medal in the 100 m hurdles event having won the gold medal at the 2024 European Athletics Championships, where she established a new personal best, national record and championship record at 12.31 seconds. She also won the gold medal in the 60 m hurdles at the 2022 World Indoor Championships, and the silver medal at the 2024 World Athletics Indoor Championships where she lowered the current French national record to 7.73 seconds.

Samba-Mayela holds European under-18 bests in the 60 m and 100 m hurdles (76.2 cm). She won silver medals for the 100 m hurdles at the 2017 World U18 Championships and 2021 European U23 Championships.

== Biography ==
=== Junior career ===
Samba-Mayela won the gold medal in the medley relay at the 2016 European Youth Athletics Championships, running the 100 metres leg in Tbilisi.

In 2017, she was the World U18 Championship 100 m hurdles silver medallist in Nairobi.

=== 2020–2022: World Indoor Champion ===
She was crowned French senior champion in the 60 m hurdles indoors in 2020 in Liévin. On 12 September that year, she won the French outdoor championship at the Stadium Municipal, Albi, running the 100 m hurdles in a time of 12.73, the fastest ever time by a European teenager, and the eighth-fastest French woman ever. In 2020 it was the fourth-fastest time by a woman in the world. Shortly prior to this, she had claimed victories over quality international line-ups in Chorzów and Marseille.

In Madrid, on 19 June 2021, Samba-Mayela took victory in 12.80 seconds in the 100 m hurdles to meet the Olympic minimum standard for the delayed 2020 Tokyo Olympics. Unfortunately, an injury during the warm-up pre-race prevented her Olympic debut.

In 2022, she won the gold medal for the 60 m hurdles at the World Indoor Championships held in Belgrade, Serbia, setting a French national record of 7.78 seconds. Devynne Charlton took silver in 7.81 s while the third-placed Gabbi Cunningham clocked 7.87 s.

=== 2023-present: Olympic silver medalist, European Champion ===
In August 2023, she competed at the 2023 World Athletics Championships in Budapest and qualified for the semi-finals. She was a silver medalist at the 2024 World Athletics Indoor Championships in Glasgow in the 60 metres hurdles, running a national record 7.73 seconds in the semi-final and 7.74 seconds in the final.

In April 2024, she ran a personal best and national record time of 12.55 at the 2024 Xiamen Diamond League. She ran 12.52 to win the 2024 Prefontaine Classic in Eugene, Oregon on 25 May 2024. In June, she won the 100 m hurdles at the 2024 European Athletics Championships in Rome, breaking the championship record and setting a personal best time of 12.31 seconds. She won the silver medal in the 100 m hurdles at the 2024 Paris Olympics in August, running 12.34 seconds in the final to finish runner-up to Masai Russell of the United States.

In September 2024, it was announced that she had signed up for the inaugural season of the Michael Johnson founded Grand Slam Track. However, her 2025 season was debilitated by injuries, and she missed the 2025 World Championships and the 2026 World Indoor Championships. After returning to action, she placed second over 100 m hurdles at the Addis Ababa Grand Prix, the first World Athletics Continental Tour meeting to be held in Ethiopia, on 18 April 2026. On 6 June, and ran 12.65 seconds for the 100 metres hurdles, her fastest time since September 2024, at the USATF Lone Star Grand Prix in College Station, Texas.

In September 2026, Samba-Mayela was issued with a provisional suspension by the Athletics Integrity Unit pending further investigation for "whereabouts failures" relating to anti-doping rules.

== Achievements ==
=== International competitions ===
Representing France
Year	Competition	Venue	Position	Event	Time
2016	European U18 Championships	Tbilisi, Georgia	1st	Medley relay	2:08.48 PB
2017	World U18 Championships	Nairobi, Kenya	2nd	100 m hurdles	12.80
2018	World U20 Championships	Tampere, Finland	8th	100 m hurdles	14.11
2021	European U23 Championships	Tallinn, Estonia	2nd	100 m hurdles	12.80
2022	World Indoor Championships	Belgrade, Serbia	1st	60 m hurdles	7.78 NR
2022	World Championships	Eugene, United States	28th (h)	100 m hurdles	13.15
2022	European Championships	Munich, Germany	7th	100 m hurdles	13.05
2023	European Indoor Championships	Istanbul, Turkey	8th (sf)	60 m hurdles	8.00
2023	World Championships	Budapest, Hungary	17th (sf)	100 m hurdles	12.95
2024	World Indoor Championships	Glasgow, United Kingdom	2nd	60 m hurdles	7.74
2024	European Championships	Rome, Italy	1st	100 m hurdles	12.31 CR
2024	Olympic Games	Paris, France	2nd	100 m hurdles	12.34

=== National titles ===
- French Athletics Championships
  - 100 m hurdles: 2020, 2021
- French Indoor Athletics Championships
  - 60 m hurdles: 2020

== Personal life ==
Samba-Mayela was born in Champigny-sur-Marne, in the Île-de-France region. She is of Congolese descent.
