= Milica Emini =

Serbian hurdler

Personal information
- Born: 1 March 1999 (age 27)

Sport
- Sport: Athletics
- Event: Hurdles

Achievements and titles
- Personal bests: 60 m hurdles: 8.13 (2024); 100 m hurdles: 12.99 (2023) NR
Medal record
Representing Serbia
Balkan Indoor Championships
| Bronze medal – third place | 2017 Belgrade | 60 m hurdles |

Milica Emini (born 11 October 1999) is a Serbian hurdler. She is the Serbian national record holder in the 100 metres hurdles, and has won multiple national titles. She has represented Serbia in major championships, including in the 60 metres hurdles at the 2024 World Athletics Indoor Championships.

== Biography ==
She is from Vojvodina. In July 2023, Emini broke the Serbian national record for the 100 metres hurdles twice in a week, first breaking the record at the 2023 Balkan Games in Kraljevo with 13.15 seconds. She then set a new personal best and Serbian national record in the 100 metres hurdles, and dipped below 13 seconds for the first time, by running 12.99 seconds (+1.88 m/ps) in winning the Serbian Championships at the same venue. That year, she was part of the Serbian squad that represented the country at the 2023 European Athletics Team Championships in Poland.

In February 2024, she set a personal best of 8.13 seconds for the 60 metres hurdles in the preliminary heat at ISTAF Berlin Indoor, before running 8.15 in the final. Emini represented Serbia over 60 metres hurdles at the 2024 World Athletics Indoor Championships in Glasgow, Scotland, making her debut at a Global championships, running 8.31 seconds without advancing to the semi-finals. She ran 13.24 seconds for the 100 metres hurdles representing Serbia at the 2024 European Athletics Championships in Rome, Italy in June. That month, she was runner-up in the 100 metres hurdles at the Serbian Championships.

Emini won the 2025 Serbian Championships in 13.08 seconds in August 2025.

In August 2026, she competed at the 2026 European Athletics Championships in Birmingham, England, in the women's 100 metres hurdles.
