= Marcia Sey =

British hurdler (born 2001)

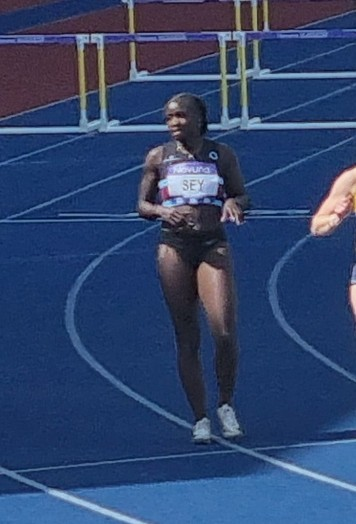
- 2025 UK Athletics Championships

Personal information
- Nationality: British
- Born: 7 November 2001 (age 24)

Sport
- Sport: Athletics
- Event: Hurdles

Achievements and titles
- Personal bests: 60m hurdles: 8.10 (Geneva, 2023); 100m hurdles: 12.65 (Birmingham, 2026)

Marcia Sey (born 7 November 2001) is a British sprint hurdler. She won the 100 metres hurdles title at the 2026 UK Athletics Championships.

== Early life ==
Sey competed as a member of Croydon Athletics Club in Croydon and ran for the club in the age-group relays at the 2015 Anniversary Games at the Olympic Stadium in London. She was educated at Millfield in Somerset, and won the English Schools and England Athletics titles in sprint hurdles in 2016 and the School Games title over the 80m hurdles in 2018.

== Career ==
Sey finished fourth in the sprint hurdles at the 2018 European Athletics U18 Championships in Győr, and was later selected for the British team for the 2019 European Athletics U20 Championships in Borås, Sweden.

Sey competed in the American collegiate system for Ohio State University before transferring to Howard University. She ran 8.21 seconds for the 60 metres hurdles to win the HBCU & Ivy Challenge in Cambridge, Massachusetts in December 2024. The following month, she ran 8.11 seconds for the 60 metres hurdles at the Corky Classic in Lubbock, Texas.

Sey ran a personal best of 13.00 (+1.2) for the 100m hurdles in Texas in March 2025. On 29 March she ran a wind assisted 12.76 at the Texas Relays .01 ahead of Akala Garrett. She placed third at the Tom Jones Memorial in Gainesville, Florida in April 2025 in 13.23 seconds. She ran a wind-legal 12.99 seconds at the NCAA Division I East First Rounds in May 2025. She ran a personal best in the 100 hurdles of 12.88 (+1.5 m/s) to move to tenth best on the all-time British list in the semi-finals of the 2025 NCAA Outdoor Championships in Eugene, Oregon in June 2025, before placing third in the final.

On 2 August, she qualified for the final of the 100 metres hurdles at the 2025 UK Athletics Championships in Birmingham but was one of four athletes who failed to finish, after a fall.

Sey missed the 2026 indoor season due to injury, and missed the 2026 NCAA Championships after being adjudged to false start at the NCAA Regionals. On 20 June 2026, Sey won the 100 metres hurdles title at the 2026 UK Athletics Championships, winning in a personal best 12.65 seconds, a new championship record which surpassed the previous best set in 2013 by Tiffany Porter. On 11 August, Sey was eighth in 13.01 seconds in the 100 metres hurdles final at the 2026 European Athletics Championships in Birmingham. In October 2026, Sey was moved up to the confirmation level in the 2026-27 Olympic World Class Programme awarded by UK Athletics.
