= Laëticia Bapté =

French athlete (born 1999)

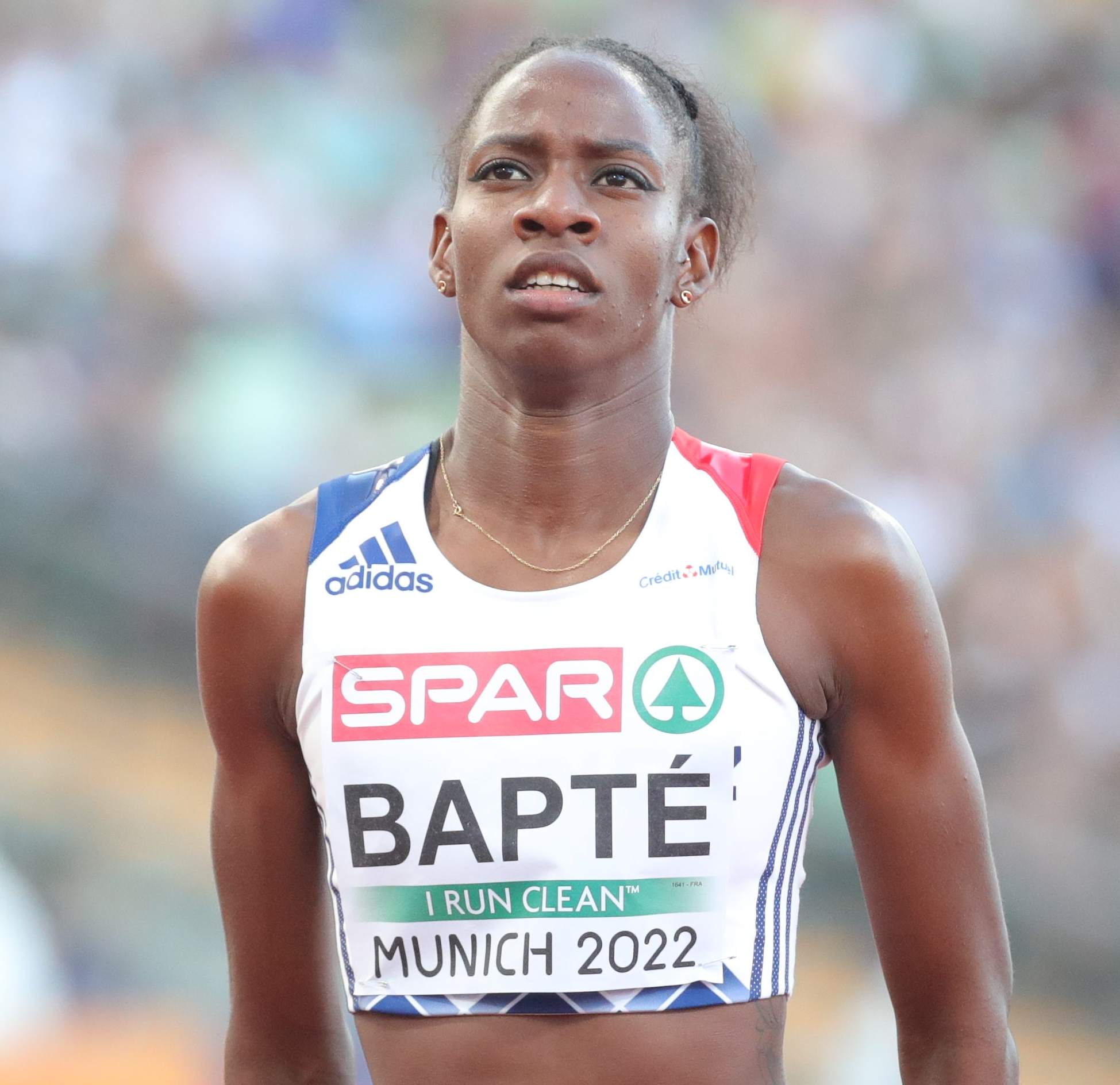
- Bapté in 2022

Personal information
- Nationality: French
- Born: 8 February 1999 (age 27) Fort-de-France, Martinique
- Height: 176 cm (5 ft 9 in)
- Weight: 58 kg (128 lb)

Sport
- Country: France
- Sport: Athletics
- Events: 60 m hurdles, 100 m hurdles

Achievements and titles
- Personal bests: 60 m hurdles: 7.76s (2025); 100 m hurdles: 12.66s (2026)
Medal record
Women's athletics
Representing France
European Championships
Bronze medal – third place	2026 Birmingham	100 m hurdles

Laëticia Bapté (born 8 February 1999) is a French track and field athlete. She is a multiple-time national champion in the 60 m hurdles. She has competed for France in multiple major championships, including the 100 metres hurdles at the 2024 Olympic Games and won the bronze medal at the 2026 European Championships.

== Biography ==
She is from Fort-de-France, on the island of Martinique, She finished third in the U20 100 metres hurdles at the 2017 CARIFTA Games, finishing behind the winner Amoi Brown of Jamaica.

Bapté won her first French title in the 60 m hurdles at the 2021 French Indoor Athletics Championships, running a new personal best time of 7.93 to do so. She was selected for the 2021 European Athletics Indoor Championships where she reached the semi-finals.

She won the French national 60 m hurdles title for a second time in 2022. Competing at the 2022 World Athletics Championships in Eugene, Oregon, Bapté reached the semi-finals of the 100 m hurdles.

Bapté won a third French title over 60 m hurdles in 2023. She was chosen to compete at the 2023 European Athletics Indoor Championships and reached the final with the second fastest time of 7.91 seconds. In the final, she finished fifth overall in a time of 7.97 seconds.

She competed in the 100 m hurdles at the 2024 Paris Olympics. She ran 12.92 seconds in the repechage round but did not qualify for the semi-finals.

She set a new personal best over 60 m hurdles, running 7.85 seconds, in Liévin on 13 February 2025. She lowered her personal best again, running 7.76 seconds to win the French Athletics Indoor Championships in Miramas on 22 February 2025. She was selected for the 2025 European Athletics Indoor Championships in Appeldoorn, Netherlands, where she reached as far as the semi-finals.

Competing indoors in January 2026, Bapte secured a win over 60 metres hurdles at the Meeting de Paris Indoors. Competing at the Meeting de l’Eure in Val-de-Reuil, a World Athletics Indoor Tour Silver meeting on 1 February 2026, Bapté ran 7.95 seconds for the 60 metres to finish in the same time as Saara Keskitalo ahead of Alaysha Johnson. The following weekend, she again finished in the same time as Johnson, winning in 7.90 seconds at the Madrid World Indoor Tour Gold. She won the 60 metres hurdles title at the 2026 French Indoor Athletics Championships in Aubiere. In March 2026, she ran in the 60 metres hurdles at the 2026 World Athletics Indoor Championships in Toruń, Poland, reaching the semi-finals. Bapté ran a new 100 m hurdles personal best 12.66 seconds on 28 June at the 2026 Meeting de Paris. On 25 July 2026, she placed second in the 100 metres hurdles at the 2026 French Championships. On 11 August, Bapté won the bronze medal with a time of 12.73 seconds in the 100 metres hurdles final at the 2026 European Athletics Championships in Birmingham. In September, she competed in the 100 m hurdles at the inaugural World Ultimate Championship in Budapest.
