= Rosina Schneider =

German athlete (born 2004)

Personal information
- Born: 18 August 2004 (age 22)

Sport
- Country: Germany
- Sport: Athletics
- Event: Hurdles

Achievements and titles
- Personal bests: 60 m hurdles 7.96 (Düsseldorf, 2025); 100 m hurdles: 12.76 (Birmingham, 2026)
Medal record
Women's athletics
Representing Germany
European U20 Championships
Gold medal – first place	2023 Jerusalem	100 m hurdles
Gold medal – first place	2023 Jerusalem	4 × 100 m relay

Rosina Schneider (born 18 August 2004) is a German hurdler. A double European U20 champion in 2023, she became German national indoor champion over 60 m hurdles in 2024.

== Early life ==
She grew up in Empfingen in Baden-Württemberg, near the Black Forest. She started athletics at the age of eight and is a member of her hometown club TV Sulz. She moved in 2021 to a boarding school at a sports school in Stuttgart and joined the training group of former sprinter Cathleen Tschirch.

== Career ==
She reached the semifinals in the 100 metres at the 2022 World Athletics U20 Championships in Cali, Colombia in August 2022.

In February 2023, she won double gold at the German Youth Indoor Championships in Dortmund, winning over 60 metres hurdles and 200 metres.

She was European U20 champion in the 100 m hurdles and 4 × 100 m relay in Jerusalem in 2023. In the hurdles she won gold with a personal best and championship record time of 13.06 seconds, with compatriot Lia Flotow claiming the bronze medal in the race.

In the winter of 2023-24 she trained in Florida with Olympic triple jump champion Christian Taylor and his wife Beate Schrott, who finished seventh in the 2012 Olympic hurdles, and then trained for three and-a-half weeks in Jamaica with the training group of Shelly-Ann Fraser-Pryce.

She won the senior German national title in the 60 m hurdles in February 2024. She finished second in the 100 m hurdles at the Liese Prokop Memorial In St. Pölten, Austria on 17 May 2024, running 13.08 seconds. She was selected for the 2024 European Athletics Championships in Rome.

She ran under 8 seconds for the 60 m hurdles for the first time on 9 February 2025, at the ISTAF Indoor in Düsseldorf, where she ran a personal best 7.96 seconds. She competed at the 2025 European Athletics Indoor Championships in Apeldoorn, Netherlands, where she qualified for the semi-finals of the 60 metres hurdles with a time of 7.97 seconds. In the semi-final she ran 8.01 seconds but did not qualify for the final.

Schneider went below eight seconds again the following year in the 60m hurdles at the Erfurt Indoor 2026, a World Athletics Indoor Tour Challenger meeting, finishing runner-up to Marlene Meier in 7.99 seconds. She placed third behind Meier and Ricarda Lobe at the German Indoor Championships in the 60 metres hurdles final on 28 February 2026. In August 2026, she competed at the 2026 European Athletics Championships in Birmingham, England, in the women's 100 metres hurdles, reaching the semi-finals having ran a personal best of 12.76 seconds.
