= Giada Carmassi =

Italian hurdler

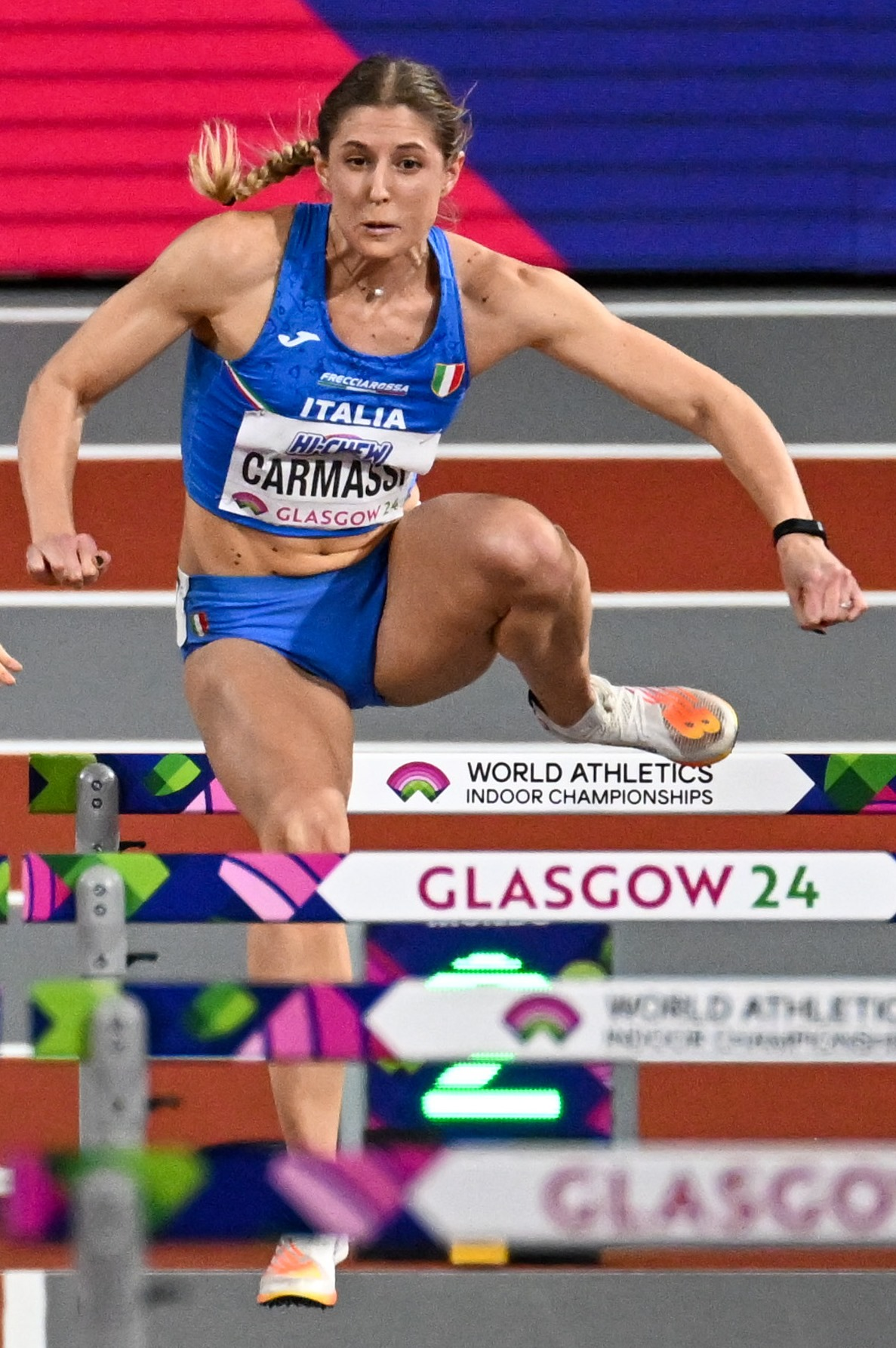
- Carmassi at the 2024 World Athletics Indoor Championships

Personal information
- National team: Italian Team
- Born: 12 May 1994 (age 32) Latisana, Italy
- Height: 1.65 m (5 ft 5 in)
- Weight: 54 kg (119 lb)

Sport
- Sport: Athletics
- Event: Hurdling
- Club: G.S. Esercito
- Coached by: Emanuele Olivieri

Achievements and titles
- Personal bests: 60 m hs: 7.98 (2025); 100 m hs: 12.69 (2025)

Giada Carmassi (born 12 May 1994) is an Italian female hurdler three-time national champion of the 100 m hs and national record holder of the same specialty.

== Career ==
On 15 June 2025 at the Diamond League meeting in 2025 BAUHAUS-galan in Stockholm she set the new Italian record for the 100 m hurdles with 12.69, taking it from Luminosa Bogliolo who held it with 12.75 set at the 2021 Tokyo Olympics.

== Achievements ==
Year	Competition	Venue	Rank	Event	Time	Notes
2024	World Indoor Championships	(United Kingdom) Glasgow	Semifinal	60 m hs	8.03	PB
2024	European Championships	(Italy) Rome	Semifinal	100 m hs	13.00	
2025	European Indoor Championships	(Netherlands) Apeldoorn	Semifinal	60 m hs	8.04	
2026	European Championships	(United Kingdom) Birmingham	Semifinal	100 m hs	13.11	(Note: She ran the heat with a best time: 12.94)

== National titles ==
She has won three national titles at individual senior level.

- Italian Athletics Championships
  - 100 m hs: 2023, 2024
- Italian Athletics Indoor Championships
  - 60 m hs: 2025

== See also ==
- List of Italian records in athletics
- Italian all-time lists - 100 metres hurdles
