= Lovise Skarbøvik Andresen =

Noreegian athlete (born 2004)

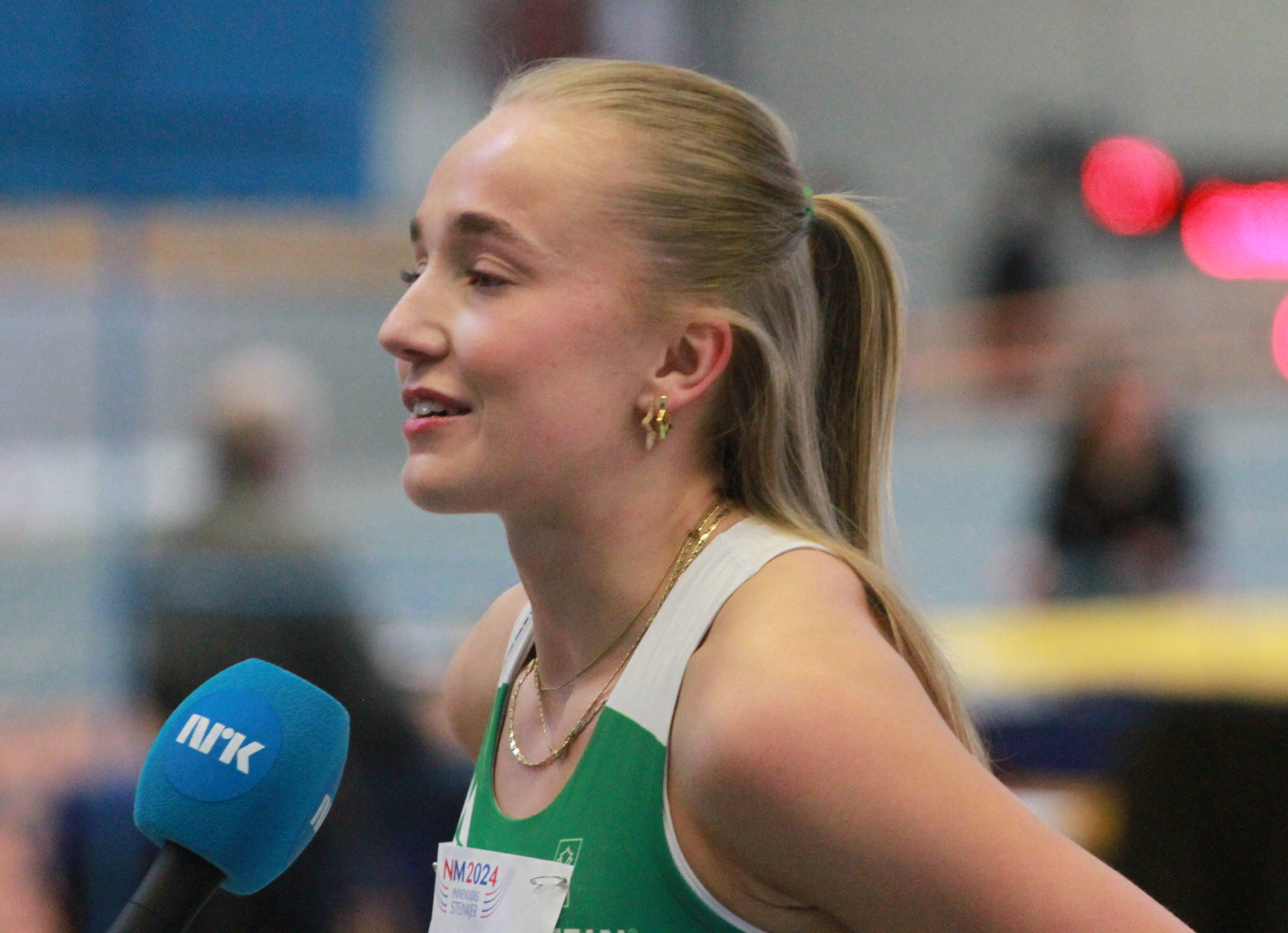
- Andersen in 2024

Personal information
- Nationality: Norwegian
- Born: 17 January 2004 (age 22)

Sport
- Sport: Athletics
- Event: Hurdles

Achievements and titles
- Personal bests: 100m hurdles: 12.96 (Rome, 2024); 60m hurdles: 7.99 (Toruń, 2026)

Lovise Skarbøvik Andresen (born 17 January 2004) is a Norwegian hurdler. In 2024, she became Norwegian national champion in the 60m hurdles and competed at the 2024 European Athletics Championships in the 100 metres hurdles.

== Early and personal life ==
A member of Dimna IL, she is from Ellingsøya in Ålesund Municipality. In 2020, she moved to Ulsteinvik to live in an apartment at the football team IL Hødd's home ground Høddvoll. She had successive operations when she was 17 and 18 years-old after being diagnosed with a rare condition, Sinus tarsi syndrome, which caused chronic pain along the outside of the foot and damage to ligaments. Doctors told her it would not certain she would be able to compete again.

== Career ==
She is coached by Arve Hatløy. She has spoken about how she has gained inspiration from another of Hatløy's former athletes, Karsten Warholm. She participated in the 100 metres hurdles at the 2022 World Athletics U20 Championships in Cali, Colombia in 2022, and the 2023 European Athletics U20 Championships in Jerusalem, Israel.

She set a personal best competing at the 2023 Bislett Games on 15 June 2023, running 13.25 seconds for the 100 metres hurdles. She won the Norwegian Athletics Indoor Championships in the 60m hurdles on 17 February 2024.

She won the 100m hurdles at the 2024 Bislett Games with a time of 13.03 seconds. She was selected for the 2024 European Athletics Championships in Rome. Competing at the event, she set a new personal best in the 100m hurdles, running 12.96 seconds to qualify from the heats to reach the semi-finals.

She competed in the 60 metres hurdles at the 2025 European Athletics Indoor Championships in Apeldoorn, Netherlands, in March 2025, but did not progress to the semi-finals.

In March 2026, she ran a personal best 7.99 seconds to reach the semi-finals of the 60 metres hurdles at the 2026 World Athletics Indoor Championships in Toruń, Poland. In August 2026, she competed at the 2026 European Athletics Championships in Birmingham, England, in the women's 100 metres hurdles.
