= Maayke Tjin A-Lim =

Dutch athlete (born 1998)

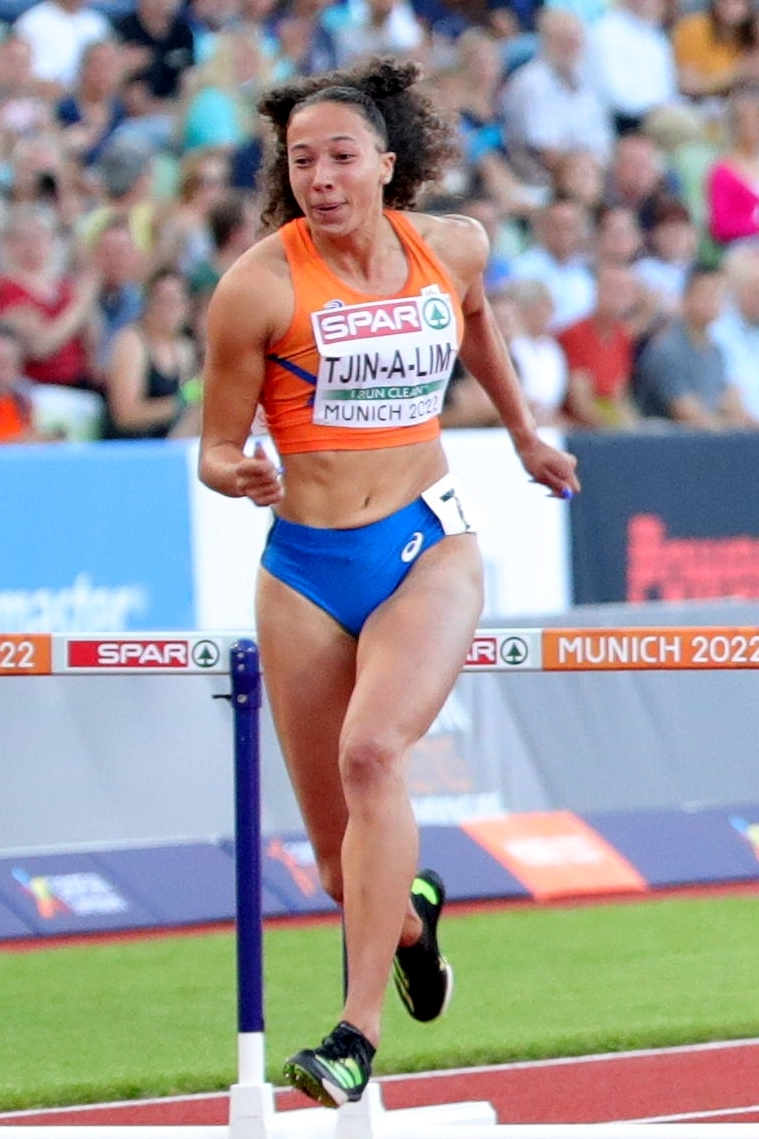
- Maayke Tjin A-Lim in 2022

Personal information
- Nationality: Dutch
- Born: 10 January 1998 (age 28)
- Height: 1.76 m (5 ft 9 in)

Sport
- Sport: Track and Field
- Events: 60 m hurdles 100 m hurdles

Achievements and titles
- Highest world ranking: No. 40 (100 m hurdles)
- Personal bests: 60 m hurdles: 7.95 i (2024); 100 m hurdles: 12.66 (2023)

Maayke Tjin A-Lim (pronounced [ˈmaːikə ˌtɕɪnaːˈlɪm]; born 10 January 1998) is a Dutch track and field athlete who competes over sprint hurdles. She has represented the Netherlands at multiple major championships, including the 2024 Olympic Games.

== Career ==
From Hoorn, Tjin A-Lim runs for the athletics club AV Zaanland, based in Zaandam. In February 2022, she came third at the Dutch Indoor Championships over 60 m hurdles and qualified for the 2022 World Athletics Indoor Championships in Belgrade, where she reached the semi-finals. In doing so she set a new personal best time of 8.21 seconds.

In May 2022, she also set a new personal best time over 100 m hurdles, running 13.16. At the end of May 2022 Tjin A-Lim lowered her personal best again, to 13.02 in Manchester. In August 2022, Tjin A-Lim competed in the 100 m hurdles at the 2022 European Athletics Championships in Munich, where she reached the semi-finals.

In January 2023, racing indoors in Luxembourg she set a new personal best over 60 m hurdles of 8.00. At the 2023 European Athletics Indoor Championships in Istanbul in March 2023, she successfully came through the heats and semi-final and qualified for the final. In the final, she finished eighth in a time of 8.09 seconds. In August 2023, she competed at the 2023 World Athletics Championships in Budapest and qualified for the semi-finals.

In February 2024, she won the Dutch indoor title in the 60 metres hurdles. She was selected for the 2024 World Athletics Indoor Championships in Glasgow to compete in the 60 metres hurdles, where she qualified for the semi-finals. She competed in the 100m hurdles at the 2024 Paris Olympics, reaching the semi-finals.

Having placed second to Nadine Visser at the 2025 Dutch Indoor Championships, she was selected for the 2025 European Athletics Indoor Championships in Apeldoorn. She won in the 100 metres hurdles ahead of Mira Groot at the 2025 Dutch Championships in Hengelo. She was a semi-finalist at the 2025 World Athletics Championships in Tokyo, Japan.

On 1 March 2026, she placed second in 7.95 seconds to Nadine Visser at the Dutch Indoor Championships. She was selected for the 2026 World Athletics Indoor Championships in Poland in March 2026.

== Personal life ==
Tjin A-Lim has discussed overcoming the eating disorder bulimia early in her career.

== Achievements ==
Information from her World Athletics profile unless otherwise noted.

=== Personal bests ===
- 100 metres hurdles: 12.66 s (La Chaux-de-Fonds, 2023)
- 60 metres hurdles: 8.00 s i (Luxembourg, 2023)

=== International competitions ===
Representing the Netherlands
Year	Competition	Venue	Position	Event	Time	Notes
2013	European Youth Summer Olympic Festival	Utrecht, Netherlands	5th	100 m hurdles	14.11 s	
2017	European U20 Championships	Grosseto, Italy	10th (sf)	100 m hurdles	14.00 s	
2022	World Indoor Championships	Belgrade, Serbia	19th (sf)	60 m hurdles	8.13 s	
2022	European Championships	Munich, Germany	19th (sf)	100 m hurdles	13.21 s	
2023	European Indoor Championships	Istanbul, Turkey	8th	60 m hurdles	8.09 s	
2023	World Championships	Budapest, Hungary	22nd (sf)	100 m hurdles	13.05 s	
2024	World Indoor Championships	Glasgow, United Kingdom	23rd (h)	60 m hurdles	8.10 s	
2024	European Championships	Rome, Italy	20th (sf)	100 m hurdles	13.08 s	
2024	Olympic Games	Paris, France	21st (sf)	100 m hurdles	13.03 s	
2025	European Indoor Championships	Apeldoorn, Netherlands	26th (h)	60 m hurdles	8.13 s	
2025	World Championships	Tokyo, Japan	12th (sf)	100 m hurdles	12.85 s	
2026	World Indoor Championships	Toruń, Poland	27th (h)	60 m hurdles	8.04 s	

^{1}Did not start in the semifinals
