= Ida Beiter Bomme =

Danish sprinter (born 2001)

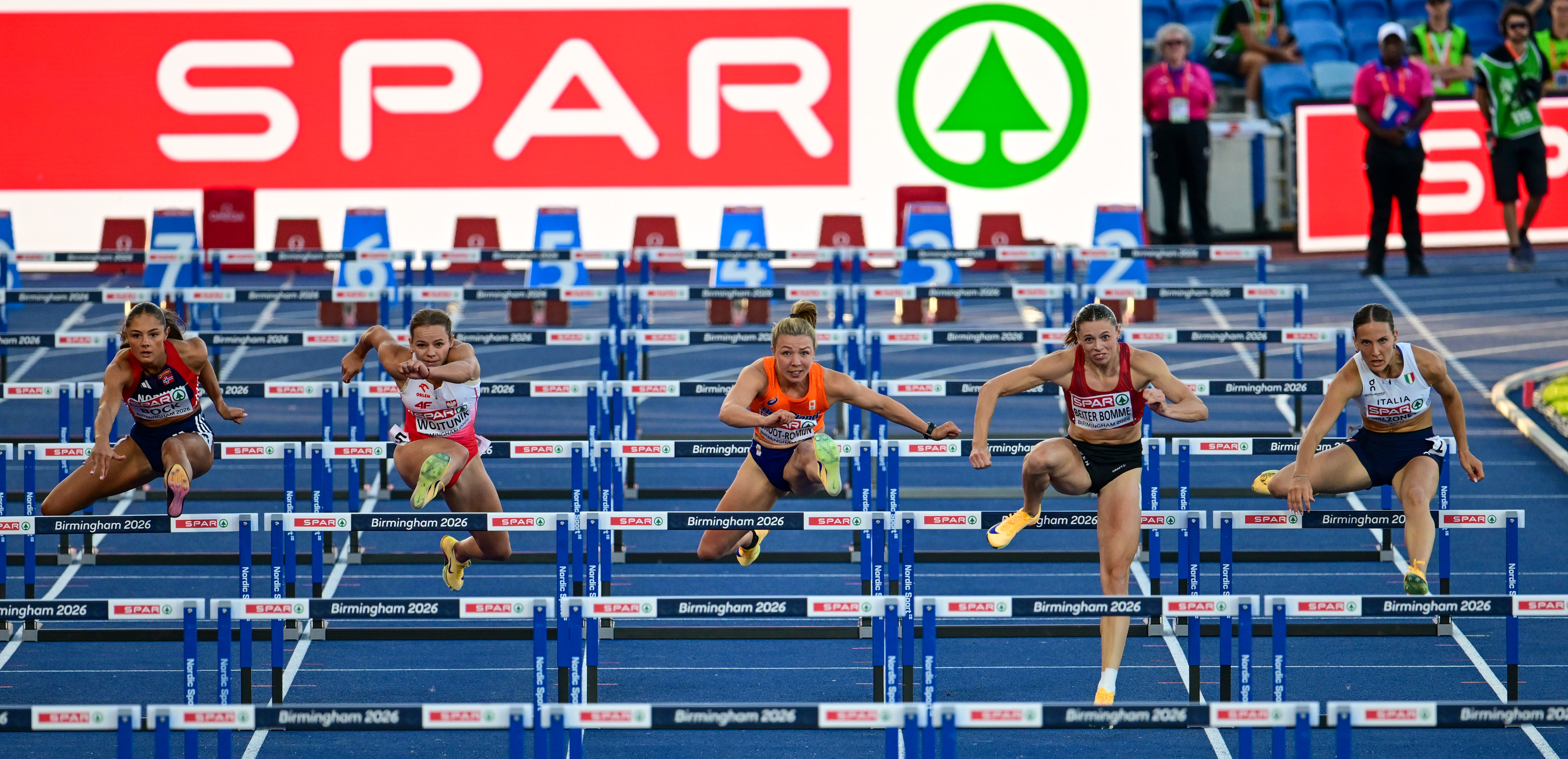
- Competing at the 2026 European Championships

Personal information
- Nationality: Danish
- Born: 25 September 2001 (age 24)
- Height: 1.70 m (5 ft 7 in)

Sport
- Sport: Track and Field
- Event: Hurdles

Achievements and titles
- Personal bests: 60m hurdles: 7.89 (Toruń, 2026) NR; 100m hurdles: 12.79 (Copenhagen, 2026) NR; Long jump: 6.58m (Karlstad, 2026)

Ida Beiter Bomme (born 25 September 2001) is a Danish hurdler. She has won Danish national titles in the 60 metres hurdles and the long jump. In 2026, she set Danish national record in the 60 metres hurdles and 100 metres hurdles. She was a semi-finalist in the 60 m hurdles at the 2025 and 2026 World Athletics Indoor Championships, and the 2025 European Athletics Indoor Championships.

== Biography ==
She competed for Denmark at the Nordic Athletics Championships in 2024, finishing third in the 60 metres hurdles. She also competed in the long jump at the Championships. That month, she set a personal best to win the 2024 Danish Indoor Athletics Championships in a time of 8.21 seconds. That year, she also won the Danish indoor long jump national title. She qualified for the final of the 100 metres hurdles at the 2024 Danish Athletics Championships in June 2024, but was unable to complete the race.

She improved her personal best from 8.21 to 7.99 seconds for the 60 metres hurdles competing at the Aarhus Sprint'n'Jump event in January 2025. This moved her to second on the Danish all-time list behind only Mette Graversgaard, who ran a best of 7.92 seconds in 2023. She lowered it again to 7.98 seconds in winning the Danish Indoor Athletics Championships in Odense in February 2025.

She competed at the 2025 European Athletics Indoor Championships in Apeldoorn, Netherlands, where she reached the semi-finals. She subsequently competed at the 2025 World Athletics Indoor Championships in Nanjing, China, where she qualified for the semi-finals with a time of 8.05 seconds. In her semi final she ran 8.19 seconds and did not progress to the final. In July, she was a semi-finalist at the 2025 University Games in Germany.

Competing on the World Athletics Indoor Tour, she showed consistency in 2026, as well as setting a personal best 7.95 seconds for the 60m hurdles in Metz. In January, she retained her title at the Aarhus Sprint'n'Jump running 7.99 seconds and 8.01 seconds for the 60 metres hurdles. On 1 February, she set a new personal best of 6.58 metres in the long jump and won the 60m hurdles at the Nordenkampen in Karlstad in 7.96 seconds. A few days later she also ran 7.96 seconds to secure a win in Belgrade. She won both the 60 metres and long jump titles at the 2026 Danish Indoor Championships, in Odense. In March 2026, she ran a Danish national record 7.89 seconds as she reached the semi-finals of the 60 metres hurdles at the 2026 World Athletics Indoor Championships in Toruń, Poland. In June 2026 in Copenhagen, she set a new Danish national record in the 100 metres hurdles with 12.79 seconds. In August 2026, she competed at the 2026 European Athletics Championships in Birmingham, England, in the women's 100 metres hurdles, reaching the semi-finals.

== Personal life ==
She is the sister of Emma Beiter Bomme.
