= Nika Glojnarič =

Slovenian athlete (born 2000)

Personal information
- Born: 29 November 2000 (age 25)

Sport
- Sport: Athletics
- Event: Hurdles

Achievements and titles
- Personal best(s): 60mH: 7.98 (2026); 100mH: 12.76 (2026)

Nika Glojnarič (born 29 November 2000) is a Slovenian sprint hurdler. She is a multiple-time national champion, and competed at the 2023 and 2025 World Championships over 100 metres hurdles and the 2024 and 2025 World Athletics Indoor Championships over 60 metres hurdles.

== Biography ==
From Brežice, she is a member of AK Brežice. In February 2018, as a 17 year-old, she narrowly missed automatic qualification for the 2018 World Indoor Championships by 17 hundredths-of-a second.

Glojnarič competed for Slovenia in the 100 metres hurdles at the 2023 World Athletics Championships in Budapest, Hungary in August 2023.

Glojnarič competed for Slovenia in the 60 metres hurdles at the 2024 World Athletics Indoor Championships in Glasgow, Scotland in March 2024. She was a semi-finalist in the 100 metres hurdles at the 2024 European Athletics Championships in Rome, Italy in June 2024.

Glojnarič competed for Slovenia in the 60 metres hurdles at the 2025 European Athletics Indoor Championships in Apeldoorn, Netherlands in March 2025. Later that month, she reached the semifinals of the 2025 World Athletics Indoor Championships in Nanjing, China.

Glojnarič competed for Slovenia at the 2025 European Athletics Team Championships in Maribor, Slovenia in June 2025. In August 2025, Glojnarič won the 100 metres title at the Slovenian Athletics Championship for the fourth consecutive year. Glojnarič competed for Slovenia at the 2025 World Athletics Championships in Tokyo, Japan, in September 2025, placing fifth in her heat in 13.13 seconds without advancing to the semi-finals.

In January 2026, she won the women’s 60m hurdles in a lifetime best of 8.03 seconds at the Orlen Cup Lodz in Poland, before lowering again to 7.98 seconds the following month in Ostrava. The following month, she won the 2026 Slovenian Indoor Athletics Championships in 8.14 seconds. In March 2026, she ran in the 60 metres hurdles at the 2026 World Athletics Indoor Championships in Toruń, Poland, reaching the semi-finals. On 4 June 2026, at the Liese Prokop Memorial in St. Pölten, she won the 100 metres hurdles in a personal best 12.76 seconds.
