= Assinie Wilson =

Jamaican sprinter (born 2002)

Personal information
- Nationality: Jamaican
- Born: 10 April 2002 (age 24)

Sport
- Sport: Athletics
- Event: 400 metres hurdles
- Club: Titans
- Coached by: Gregory Little

Achievements and titles
- Personal bests: 400m: 45.51 (2023); 400m hurdles: 48.29 (2026)
Medal record
Men's athletics
Representing Jamaica
Commonwealth Games
Bronze medal – third place	2026 Glasgow	400m hurdles
NACAC Championships
Bronze medal – third place	2025 Freeport	400 m hurdles
NACAC U23 Championships
Gold medal – first place	2023 San Jose	4x400m relay
Silver medal – second place	2023 San Jose	400m hurdles

Assinie Wilson (born 10 April 2002) is a Jamaican hurdler. He won the Jamaican Athletics Championships in the 400 metres hurdles in 2026 and won the bronze medal at the 2026 Commonwealth Games. He competed at the 2023 World Athletics Championships.

== Biography ==
He was educated at Ferncourt High School in St. Ann, Jamaica and competed for the school at the ISSA Boys and Girls Athletics Championships.

== Career ==
=== 2023 ===
In 2023, he was a member of Titans International Track Club. He was a silver medalist in the 400 metres hurdles at the 2023 NACAC U23 Championships in Costa Rica, with a time of 49.70 seconds. At the same Championships, he won a gold medal in the men's 4 x 400 metres relay. He ran a personal best 48.50 seconds to finish third at the 2023 Jamaican Athletics Championships over 400 metre hurdles. He was selected for the 400m hurdles at the 2023 World Athletics Championships in Budapest.

=== 2024 ===
In April 2024, he was selected as part of the Jamiacan team for the 2024 World Athletics Relays in Nassau, Bahamas. He ran a personal best 48.36 for the 400 metres hurdles but was out-dipped by Jaheel Hyde into fourth place at the Jamaican Olympic Trials in June 2024.

=== 2025 ===
In March 2025, coached by Greg Little, alongside Malik James-King, he opened his 2025 season with a time of 48.68 seconds in the men's 400m hurdles at the Velocity Fest 16 meet in Jamaica. He was announced as a competitor at the inaugural Grand Slam Track event, in Kingston, Jamaica, held in April 2025. In May 2025, month, he was named as a challenger again for the 2025 Grand Slam Track event in Philadelphia. He finished second in the 400m hurdles on 7 June 2025, at the Racers Grand Prix, a World Athletics Continental Tour Silver meeting, in Kingston, Jamaica. He was runner-up to Roshawn Clarke in the 400 metres hurdles final at the 2025 Jamaican Athletics Championships in 48.42 seconds before placing seventh at the 2025 Prefontaine Classic on 5 July. He was named in the Jamaican squad for the 2025 NACAC Championships in Freeport, The Bahamas, winning the bronze medal in the 400m hurdles. He competed at the 2025 World Athletics Championships in the men's 400 metres hurdles in Tokyo, Japan, in September 2025.

=== 2026 ===
In May, he ran at the 2026 World Athletics Relays in the men's 4 × 400 metres relay in Gaborone, Botswana. In June, he won over 400 metres hurdles at the Josef Odložil Memorial in Prague, and won his first senior national title at the 2026 Jamaican Athletics Championships. On 31 July, he won the bronze medal in the 400 metres hurdles at the 2026 Commonwealth Games in Glasgow, Scotland.

== Statistics ==
Grand Slam Track results
Slam	Race group	Event	Pl.	Time	Prize money
2025 Kingston Slam	Long hurdles	400 m hurdles	7th	53.24	US$12,500
2025 Kingston Slam	Long hurdles	400 m	6th	46.70	US$12,500
2025 Philadelphia Slam	Long hurdles	400 m hurdles	6th	49.68	US$20,000
2025 Philadelphia Slam	Long hurdles	400 m	5th	46.24	US$20,000
