= Samuel Chapple =

Dutch middle-distance runner

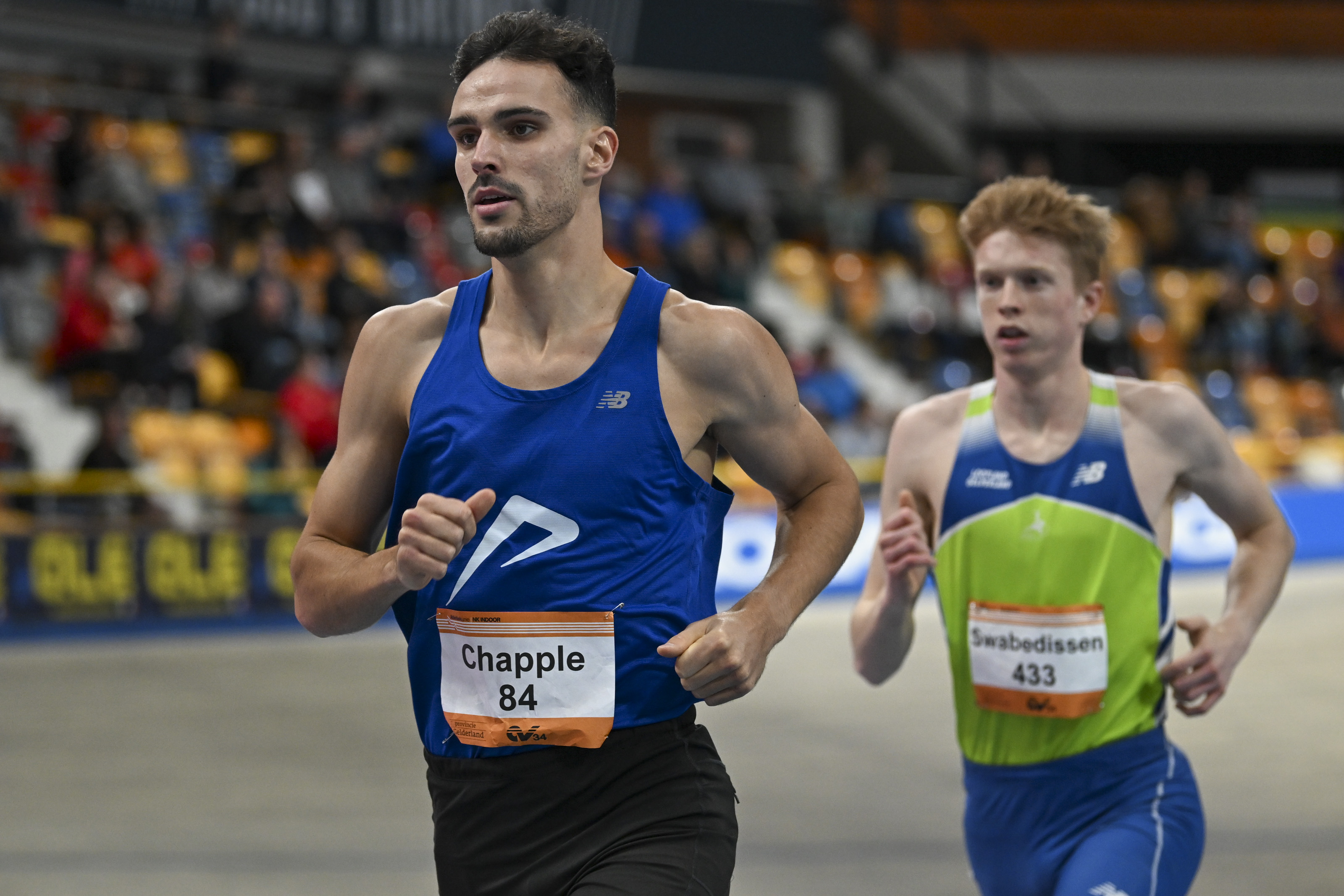
- Samuel Chapple at the 2024 Dutch Indoor Championships.

Personal information
- Nationality: Dutch
- Born: 23 November 1998 (age 27)
- Height: 1.92 m (6 ft 4 in)
- Weight: 80 kg (180 lb; 13 st)

Sport
- Sport: Athletics
- Event: Middle-distance running

Achievements and titles
- Personal bests: 800m: 1:43.96 (Budapest, 2025); Indoors; 800m: 1:44.88 (Apeldoorn, 2025) NR; 1000m: 2:16.09 (Birmingham, 2025) NR; 1500m: 3:32.68 (Torún, 2026) NR
Medal record
Men's athletics
Representing Netherlands
European Indoor Championships
Gold medal – first place	2025 Apeldoorn	800 m

Samuel Chapple (born 23 November 1998) is a Dutch middle-distance runner. He became Dutch national indoor champion in 2022 over 800 metres. In 2025, he became Dutch national record holder over 800 metres, 1000 metres, and 1500 metres indoors. He won the gold medal over 800 metres at the 2025 European Athletics Indoor Championships.

== Early and personal life ==
Born to a Spanish mother and a British father, he is multi-lingual. From The Hague in South Holland, he ran as a member of the Olympus'70 athletic club in Naaldwijk. He was a member of the Team Distance Runners in Castricum from 2018 to 2022 with Guido Hartensveld. He then spent time from 2022 to 2023 with the National Team in Papendal and trained with Tomasz Lewandowski. He later based himself in Ede with the Valley Running Team and his coach Grete Koens.

== Career ==
He won the 800 metres at the 2022 Dutch Indoor Athletics Championships. He competed over 800 metres at the 2022 World Athletics Indoor Championships in Belgrade, placing ninth overall. His progress was hampered when he missed the outdoor season in 2022 after he broke his ankle and tore his ankle ligaments competing in Belgium.

In January 2025, he set a new Dutch indoor record over 1500 metres of 3:35.61, and in February 2025, he set a new Dutch indoor record over 800 metres of 1:45.46, both whilst competing in Apeldoorn. He also beat Rob Druppers’ long-standing Dutch record over 1000 metres with 2:16.09 to win the Keely Klassic on 15 February 2025. The following weekend, he won the Dutch national indoor title over 800 metres. He was selected for the 2025 European Athletics Indoor Championships in Apeldoorn, where he caught Belgian Elliott Crestan on the finish line to win the gold medal in the 800 metres final and lower his national record to 1:44.88. He was selected for the 2025 World Athletics Indoor Championships in Nanjing. He qualified for the final of the 800 metres, placing fourth overall.

In May 2025, he was named as a challenger in the short distance category at the 2025 Grand Slam Track event in Philadelphia. He competed at the 2025 World Athletics Championships in Tokyo, Japan, in September 2025 in the men's 800 metres.

Chapple set an indoor personal best of 1:44.75 for the 800 metres in Ostrava on 3 February 2026. He ran an indoors personal best of 3:32.68 for the 1500 metres at the Copernicus Cup in Toruń on 22 February 2026. He ran 3:47.91 to win the 1500 metres at the 2026 Dutch Indoor Athletics Championships in Apeldoorn. He was selected for the 1500 metres at the 2026 World Athletics Indoor Championships in Poland in March 2026, placing fifth overall in the final. On 21 June, he ran 1:44.63 to place second in the 800 metres behind Niels Laros at the FBK Games in Hengelo. In August, he competed at the 2026 European Athletics Championships in Birmingham, England, in the 1500 metres.

== Statistics ==
=== Circuit performances ===
Grand Slam Track results
Slam	Race group	Event	Pl.	Time	Prize money
2025 Philadelphia Slam	Short distance	800 m	7th	1:46.07	US$12,500
2025 Philadelphia Slam	Short distance	1500 m	7th	3:37.33	US$12,500
