= Isabella Whittaker =

American athlete (born 2002)

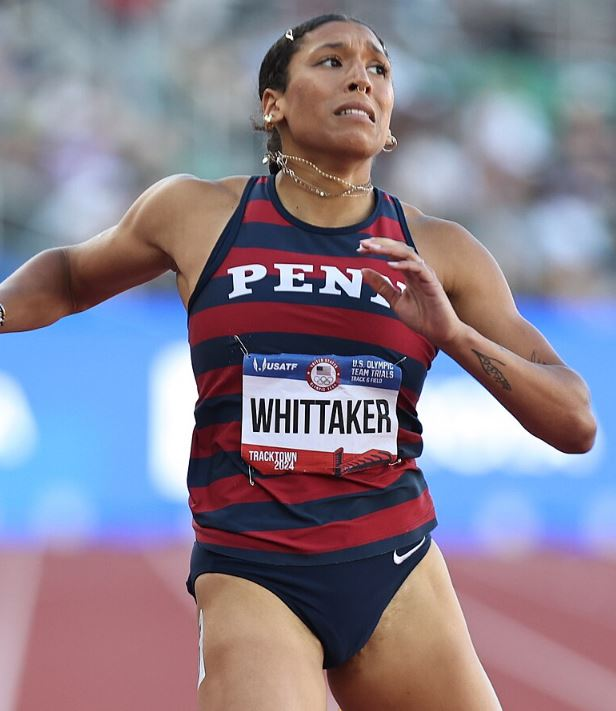

Personal information
- Nationality: American
- Born: February 15, 2002 (age 24)
- Home town: Laurel, Maryland, U.S.

Sport
- Sport: Athletics
- Event: Sprint

Achievements and titles
- Personal best(s): 200m: 23.18 (Princeton, 2024); 400m: 49.24 (Virginia Beach, 2025)
Medal record
Women's athletics
Representing United States
World Championships
Gold medal – first place	2025 Tokyo	4 × 400 m relay

Isabella Whittaker (born February 15, 2002) is an American sprinter. She is the North American indoor record holder for the 400 m dash with a time of 49.24 seconds, set on March 15, 2025, in Virginia Beach.

== Early life ==
She grew up in Laurel, Maryland. She was a competitive swimmer as a youngster and it was not until high school that she started running track. She attended Mount De Sales Academy, a private Catholic all–girls high school in Baltimore. In 2020 she started at the University of Pennsylvania and graduated in 2024. In April 2024, she was announced to be matriculating to the University of Arkansas as a member of their Track and Field team and graduate student. As of April 2025, she was announced as a Grand Slam Track Challenger.

== Career ==
She ran a personal best of 50.17 seconds to finish fifth in the final of the 2024 NCAA Division 1 Outdoor final in Eugene, Oregon in June 2024.

She ran 50.48 seconds to qualify for the final of the American Olympic trials in June 2024. In the final she finished sixth with a time of 50.68 seconds. In July 2024 she was included in the American relay pool for the 2024 Paris Olympics.

On 1 March 2025, she moved to seventh on the women’s world indoor 400m all-time list after running 49.90 at the Southeastern Conference Indoor Track & Field Championships in Texas. On March 15, 2025, she moved to second all-time on the women's world indoor 400m list with an American and NCAA Record time of 49.24 to win the 2025 NCAA Indoor Championships in Virginia Beach. The time bettered Britton Wilson's North American record set in 2023, and placed her second only behind Femke Bol of the Netherlands.

At the second 2025 Grand Slam Track event in Miami she finished fourth in the 400 metres with a time of 50.38 seconds on 2 May 2025. She then finished third in the 200 metres race in her category with a time of 22.76 seconds. She ran 49.58 seconds to win the 400 metres at the 2025 Bislett Games, in Oslo, and 49.78 seconds to win at the 2025 BAUHAUS-galan event in Stockholm, both part of the 2025 Diamond League. She placed third behind Sydney McLaughlin-Levrone and Aaliyah Butler in the 400 metres at the 2025 Prefontaine Classic. She qualified for the final of the 400 metres at the 2025 USA Outdoor Track and Field Championships, running winning her semi-final in 50.07 seconds, finishing second in the final behind Sydney McLaughlin-Levrone in 49.59 seconds. Competing in Switzerland, she finished third at the 2025 Athletissima in wet conditions in Lausanne, and placed sixth in the 400 metres at the Diamond League Final in Zurich, in August 2025.

Competing at the 2025 World Athletics Championships in Tokyo, she was a semi-finalist in the women's 400 metres.

== Personal life ==
Her parents Paul and Jill, both ran in college. Paul was a mid-distance runner and Jill was a hurdler. One of four siblings, her sister Juliette Whittaker competes as a middle-distance runner.

== Statistics ==
Grand Slam Track results
Slam	Race group	Event	Pl.	Time	Prize money
2025 Miami Slam	Long sprints	400 m	4th	50.38	US$30,000
2025 Miami Slam	Long sprints	200 m	3rd	22.76	US$30,000
2025 Philadelphia Slam	Long sprints	400 m	3rd	50.16	US$50,000
2025 Philadelphia Slam	Long sprints	200 m	2nd	22.82	US$50,000
