= Amon Kemboi =

Kenyan long-distance runner

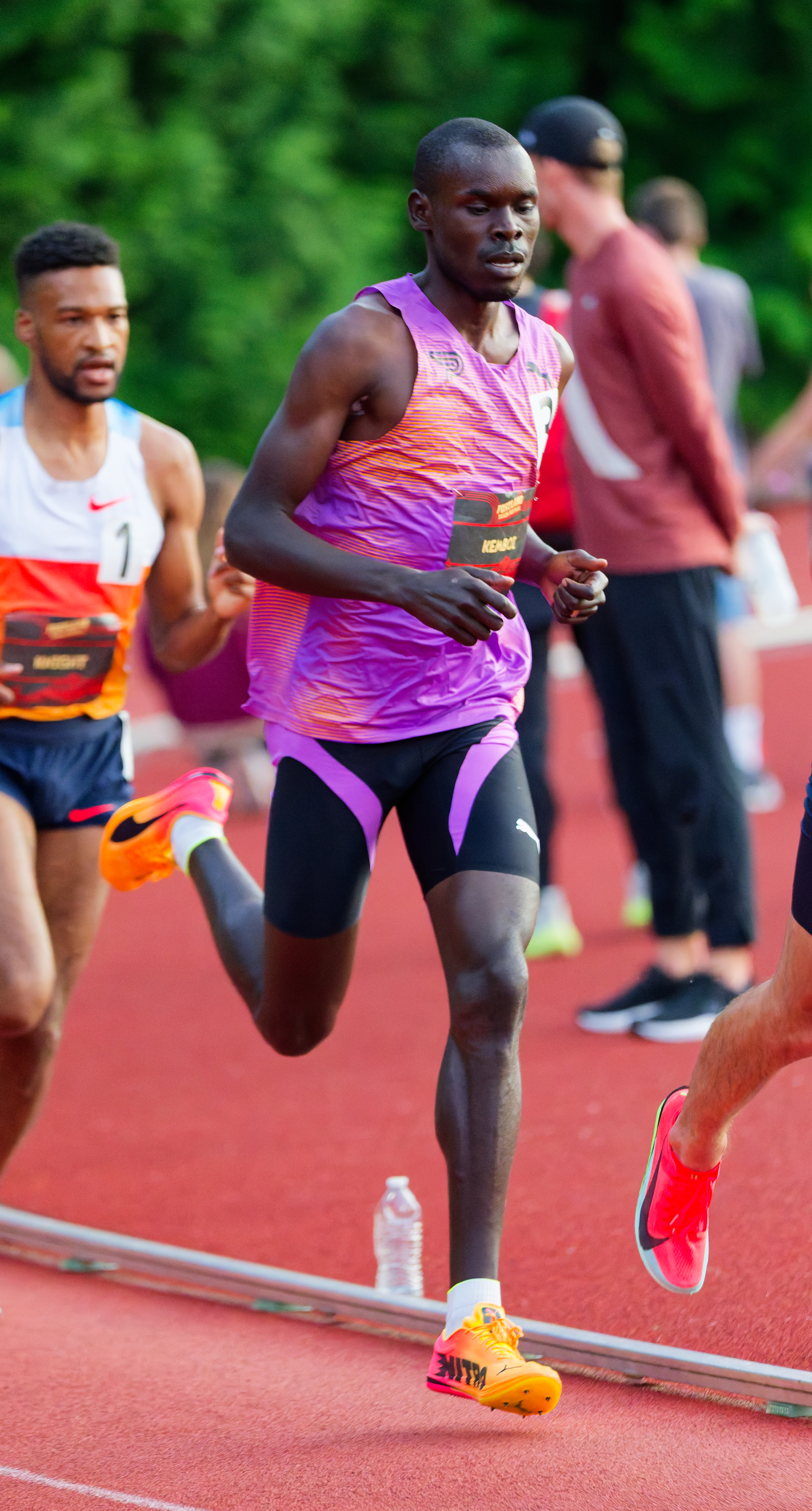
- Kemboi in 2025

Personal information
- Born: 10 December 1995 (age 30)

Sport
- Sport: Athletics
- Event: Long-distance running

Achievements and titles
- Personal bests: 1500m 3:33.49 (Los Angeles, 2024); Mile: 3:53.57 (Boston, 2025); 3000m 7:38.99 (Boston, 2024); 5000m: 12:58.51 (Oordegem, 2025)

Amon Kemboi (born 10 December 1995) is a Kenyan middle- and long-distance runner. Competing in the United States, he became the first man to earn five All-America honours for NCAA cross country running.

== NCAA ==
He is from Kapsabet, Kenya before racing in the college system in the United States. In March 2018, competing for Campbell University, he won All-American indoor honours in the 5000 metres. He was later voted the 2017-18 Big South Conference Men's Runner of the Year. In 2019, he broke his own school record and set a new Big South Conference record, for the indoor mile run. He later also attended the University of Arkansas, for whom he was named the South Central Region Athlete of the Year twice by the United States Track & Field and Cross Country Coaches Association. Kemboi also became the first man to earn five All-America honours in NCAA cross country running.

== Professional career ==
In June 2023, he won the 1500 metres race at the Portland Track Festival in Oregon in 3:34.12, closing the race with 56.40s for the final 400m.

He finished third behind Josh Kerr and Josh Hoey at the New Balance 5th Avenue Mile in New York in September 2024. His time of 3:49.3 moved him into the all-time top-10 in the race's history.

In January 2025, he acted as pacemaker at the Houston Half Marathon as Conner Mantz broke the American half marathon national record.

In April 2025, he finished third at the Boston 5k, running a time of 13:37. He was added as a challenger to the men's long-distance field at the 2025 Grand Slam Track event in Miami, where he finished seventh in the 3000 metres race on 2 May 2025. In August 2025, he won the Falmouth Road Race. On 1 November 2025, Kemboi won the Abbot Dash 5k in New York City.

== Statistics ==
Grand Slam Track results
Slam	Race group	Event	Pl.	Time	Prize money
2025 Miami Slam	Long distance	3000 m	7th	8:20.16	US$10,000
2025 Miami Slam	Long distance	5000 m	6th	13:50.64	US$10,000
