= Chris Robinson (hurdler) =

American hurdler (born 2001)

Personal information
- Nationality: United States
- Born: February 19, 2001 (age 25)

Sport
- Sport: Athletics

Achievements and titles
- Personal bests: Outdoor; 400 m: 44.15 (2025); 400 m hurdles: 47.61 (2026)
Medal record
Men's athletics
Representing the United States
World Indoor Championships
Gold medal – first place	2026 Toruń	4 × 400 m relay
World Relays
Gold medal – first place	2025 Guangzhou	4 × 400 m mixed

Chris Robinson (born February 19, 2001) is an American hurdler. He won the 400 metres hurdles national title at the 2026 USA Championships.

Robinson was the 2023 NCAA champion over 400 metres hurdles and was a semi-finalist at the 2025 World Athletics Championships. He was runner-up over the flat 400 metres at the 2026 USA Indoor Championships and was a gold medalist in the Men's 4 × 400 metres relay at the 2026 World Indoor Championships.

== Early life ==
He attended James S. Rickards High School in Tallahassee, Florida before attending the University of Alabama.

== Career ==
In June 2023, he won the 400 m hurdles at the NCAA Outdoor Track & Field Championships in Austin, Texas, running for the University of Alabama, running a personal best 48.12 seconds, which was also a facility record time.

He set a new personal best of 47.95 seconds for the 400 metres hurdles at the Tom Jones Invitational in Gainesville, Florida in April 2024. He won the 400 m hurdles at the SEC Championships in May 2024. He was runner-up to Caleb Dean at the 2024 NCAA Championships Outdoor Championships final in June 2024. Later that month, he finished in fourth place overall in the 400 metres hurdles at the USATF Olympic Trials in Eugene, Oregon.

He was one of the athletes who took part in the inaugural Grand Slam Track event in April 2025, running in the long hurdles category of 2025 Grand Slam Track Kingston in Jamaica. In the 400 metres race at the weekend, he ran 45.54 to finish as runner-up in the race to Alison Dos Santos. On 19 April 2025, he lowered his personal best for the 400 metres to 44.15 seconds at the Tom Jones Memorial in Gainesville, Florida. At the second 2025 Grand Slam Track event in Miami he finished second behind Dos Santos again in the 400 metres hurdles on 2 May 2025. He then also finished runner-up to Dos Santos in the 400 metres race in their category at the event, in a time of 44.86 seconds.

He was named in the American team for the 2025 World Athletics Relays in Guangzhou, China in May 2025. He was a member of the mixed 4 × 400 metres relay team alongside Courtney Okolo, Johnnie Blockburger, and Lynna Irby-Jackson, that won their heat with a world-leading time to qualify an American team for the 2025 World Championships. In the final the quartet won the gold medal and broke the championship record to win in 3:09.54.

On 1 June 2025, he finished runner-up in the 400 metres in the long hurdles category at the 2025 Philadelphia Slam. He ran a season's best time of 48.05 seconds to win the 400 metres hurdles at the Golden Spike Ostrava on 24 June despite struggling with a kit issue that caused him to adjust his shorts several times mid-race.

He finished third behind Rai Benjamin and Caleb Dean in the final of the 400 metres hurdles at the 2025 USA Outdoor Track and Field Championships in Eugene. Selected for the 2025 World Athletics Championships in Tokyo, Japan, in September 2025, he was a semi-finalist in the men's 400 metres hurdles, but suffered an injury in his semi-final and was unable to finish the race.

On 1 March 2026, he was second behind Khaleb McRae in the 400 metres at the 2026 USA Indoor Track and Field Championships, running 45.36 seconds. He was selected to represent the United States at the 2026 World Athletics Indoor Championships in Toruń, Poland, and won his semi-final to qualify for the 400 metres final. In the split final, he won the first race to finish fourth overall with a time of 45.55 seconds. He also ran in the men’s 4 × 400 metres relay with the team winning the gold medal. On 4 July, Robinson placed fifth in 44.88 seconds in the 400 metres race at the 2026 Prefontaine Classic. On 26 July, Robinson won by almost a full second with a season's best time of 47.61 seconds in the final of the 400 metres hurdles at the 2026 USA Championships in New York.

== Statistics ==
Grand Slam Track results
Slam	Race group	Event	Pl.	Time	Prize money
2025 Kingston Slam	Long hurdles	400 m hurdles	6th	49.21	US$25,000
2025 Kingston Slam	Long hurdles	400 m	2nd	45.54	US$25,000
2025 Miami Slam	Long hurdles	400 m hurdles	2nd	48.92	US$50,000
2025 Miami Slam	Long hurdles	400 m	2nd	44.86	US$50,000
2025 Philadelphia Slam	Long hurdles	400 m hurdles	3rd	48.76	US$30,000
2025 Philadelphia Slam	Long hurdles	400 m	2nd	45.62	US$30,000
