= Jadyn Mays =

American athlete (born 2002)

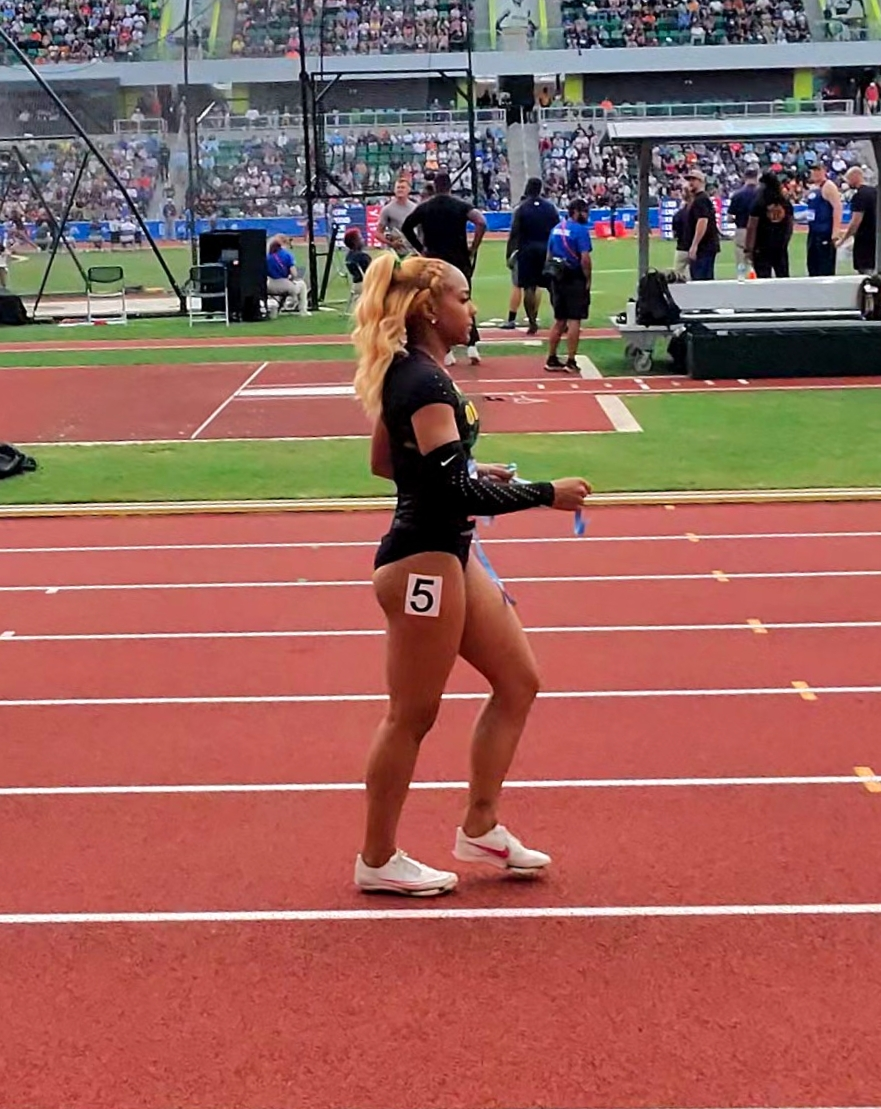
- Mays in 2024

Personal information
- Nationality: American
- Born: 2 April 2002 (age 24)

Sport
- Sport: Athletics
- Event: Sprint

Achievements and titles
- Personal best(s): 60m: 7.07 (Albuquerque, 2023); 100m: 11.01 (Boulder, 2024); 200m: 22.19 (Eugene, 2024)

Jadyn Mays (born 2 April 2002) is an American sprinter.

== Early life ==
She is from Glendale, Arizona and went to North Canyon High School before attending the University of Oregon.

== Career ==
At the 2024 NCAA Indoor Championships, Mays won the bronze medal in the 60 metres, in a time of 7.12s in Boston, Massachusetts. She also had a third-place finish in the 200 metres in a time of 22.60s.

Mays won the 2024 Pac 12 Track and Field Championships in the 100 metres and 200 metres, registering times of 11.01s and 22.46s. She ran a personal best 22.19 to finish third in the 200 metres at the 2024 NCAA Outdoor Championships in Eugene, Oregon in June 2024. At the same event, she ran a wind assisted 10.95 to finish fourth in the 100 metres final. She competed at the United States Olympic trials in June 2024, where she qualified for the final of the 200 metres and placed eighth overall.

She signed an NIL deal with Nike in January 2025. She finished second in both the 60 metres and 200 metres races to help the Oregon Ducks win the indoor Big Ten Championship in March 2025. She then finished runner-up in the 60m and 200m races at the 2025 NCAA Indoor Championships in Virginia Beach on 15 March to help the Oregon Ducks win the NCAA Indoor title as well, on 15 March. In May 2025, she was named as part of the short sprints category for the 2025 Grand Slam Track event in Philadelphia.

She reached the semi-finals of the 100 metres at the 2025 USA Outdoor Track and Field Championships, running her heat in 11.11 seconds (+1.8 m/s).

In May 2026, she ran at the 2026 World Athletics Relays in the women's 4 × 100 metres relay in Gaborone, Botswana.

== Statistics ==
=== Circuit performances ===
Grand Slam Track results
Slam	Race group	Event	Pl.	Time	Prize money
2025 Philadelphia Slam	Short sprints	200 m	5th	22.80	US$15,000
2025 Philadelphia Slam	Short sprints	100 m	7th	11.25	US$15,000
