= Sam Atkin =

British athlete

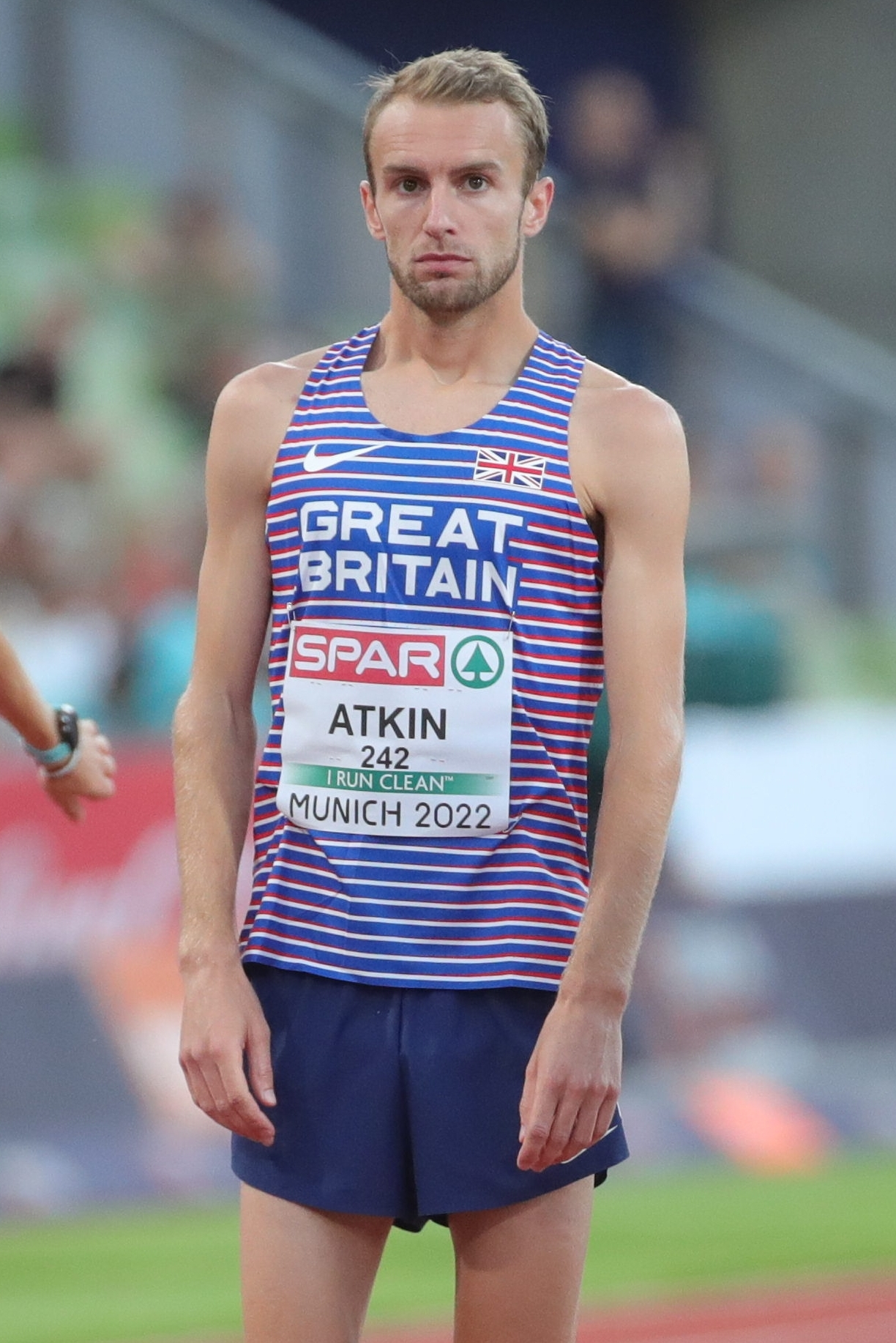
- Atkin at the 2022 European Athletics Championships

Personal information
- Nationality: British (English)
- Born: 14 March 1993 (age 33) Grimsby, England
- Education: Lewis–Clark State College

Sport
- Sport: Long-distance running
- Events: 5000 metres; 10000 metres
- University team: Lewis–Clark State Warriors
- Club: Lincoln Wellington AC

Sam Atkin (born 14 March 1993) is a British Olympic athlete specialising in long-distance running, predominantly the 5000 metres and 10,000 m races.

He is the British record holder for the 5 km road race and the British indoor record holder for the 3000 metres.

== Biography ==
Atkin won the North of England cross-country under-17 men's title in Blackburn. Also a keen footballer and tennis player as a teenager, in athletics he started with Grimsby Harriers and moved to Cleethorpes and eventually Lincoln Wellington, where he teamed up with coach Rob Lewis.

In 2011, aged 18, he had the chance to study in the United States and went to Lewis–Clark State College in Idaho. Atkin's progress was affected by a rare problem called Freiberg disease, where one of the metatarsals in his foot protrudes upwards, causing discomfort. He graduated from LCSC with a degree in Business Management and Sports Administration in 2016, stayed in Idaho and also coaches other athletes. While coaching and competing he also studied at Western Governors University and graduated with an MBA in 2019.

At the Sound Running Track Meet in California on 5 December 2020, Atkin ran the fourth fastest time by a British athlete over the 10,000 metres behind only Mo Farah, Jon Brown and Eamonn Martin. Despite starting that race as a pacemaker, he hit the Olympic qualifying time for the 2020 Tokyo Olympics where he represented Britain in the 10,000 metres race, but did not finish as he suffered an injury mid-race.

On 27 January 2023 at the John Thomas Terrier Classic on a Boston University track, the 29-year-old broke Mo Farah's seven-year British 3000 m indoor record (7:33.1) with a time of 7:31.97. Atkin took 15 seconds off his personal best and set the fastest 3000 m (indoors or out) by a UK athlete in history as (Farah's) outdoor record stood at 7:32.62 at the time. On 19 March, he sliced four seconds off Marc Scott's 2020 British 5 kilometres record with 13:16 in Lille, France.

Due to injury he didn’t compete after March 2023 until he ran a new 5000 metres personal best of 12:58.73 in Boston, Massachusetts in January 2024. He set a new outdoors personal best over 5000m running 12:54.66 at the Los Angeles Grand Prix on 17 May 2024.

Atkin was selected to represent Great Britain in the 5,000 metres at the 2024 Summer Olympics where he failed to reach the final.

He competed at the 2025 Grand Slam Track event in Miami, where he briefly led before finishing eighth in the 3000 metres race.

== Statistics ==
=== Circuit performances ===
Grand Slam Track results
Slam	Race group	Event	Pl.	Time	Prize money
2025 Miami Slam	Long distance	3000 m	8th	8:21.35	US$15,000
2025 Miami Slam	Long distance	5000 m	5th	13:47.84	US$15,000

=== Personal bests ===
Outdoor

- 800 metres – 1:53.13 (Spokane 2018)
- 1500 metres – 3:45.07 (Eugene 2018)
- Mile – 3:58.60 (St. Louis 2018)
- 3000 metres – 7:39.71 (Gateshead 2021)
- 5000 metres – 12:54.66 (Los Angeles 2024)
- 10,000 metres – 27:26.58 (San Juan Capistrano 2020)

Indoor

- 800 metres – 1:53.79 (Nampa 2018)
- Mile – 4:05.39 (Nampa 2020)
- 3000 metres – 7:31.97 (Boston 2023) NR
- 5000 metres – 12:58.73 (Boston 2024)

Road

- 5 kilometres – 13:16 (Lille 2023) NR
