= Sam Gilman (runner) =

American athlete (born 2000)

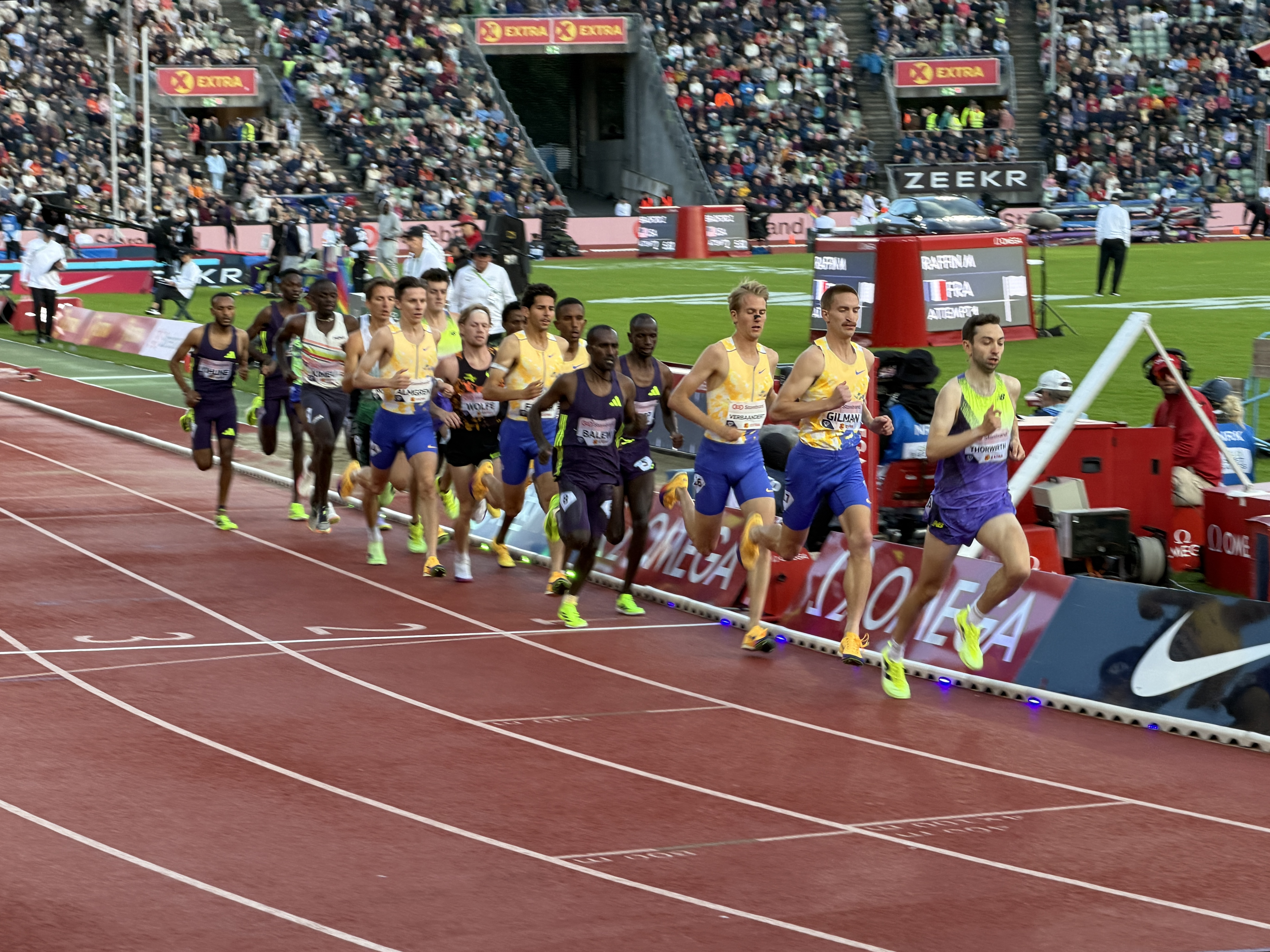
- Gilman at the 2026 Bislett Games

Personal information
- Born: 20 September 2000 (age 25)

Sport
- Sport: Athletics
- Event(s): Middle-distance running, Long-distance running

Achievements and titles
- Personal best(s): 3000m: 7:34.69 (Boston, 2025)

Sam Gilman (born 20 September 2000) is an American middle- and long-distance runner.

== Early and personal life ==
He attended Hilton Head Island High School on Hilton Head Island in South Carolina. He joined the United States Air Force Academy in Colorado Springs in 2019, where he studied business management. He later served as a 2nd Lieutenant in the US Air Force.

== Career ==
Gilman had a sixth place finish in the 2021 NCAA Cross Country Championships, and a fifth place finish in the 2022 NCAA outdoor Championships over 5000 metres.

He finished third in the 3000 metres at 2025 USA Indoor Track and Field Championships in February 2025. The following week, he ran a personal best time of 7:34.69 over that distance in Boston, Massachusetts. He was selected for the 2025 World Athletics Indoor Championships in Nanjing, where he finished fourth in the 3000 metres.

A challenger at the Grand Slam Track event in Philadelphia he was runner-up over 3000 metres to Nico Young on 1 June 2025. In December, he had a fourth place finish over 2 km at the 2025 USA Cross Country Championships.

=== Circuit performances ===
Grand Slam Track results
Slam	Race group	Event	Pl.	Time	Prize money
2025 Philadelphia Slam	Long distance	3000 m	2nd	8:01.70	US$25,000
