= Malik James-King =

Jamaican athlete (born 1999)

Personal information
- Nationality: Jamaican
- Born: 28 June 1999 (age 27)

Sport
- Sport: Athletics
- Events: Sprint, Hurdles
- Club: Titans
- Coached by: Gregory Little

Achievements and titles
- Personal bests: 400m hurdles: 47.42 (Kingston, 2024); 400m: 45.22 (Kingston, 2023)
Medal record
Men's athletics
Representing Jamaica
NACAC Championships
Silver medal – second place	2025 Freeport	400 m hurdles
CARIFTA Games (U20)
Gold medal – first place	2018 Nassau	4x400 m
Bronze medal – third place	2018 Nassau	400m hurdles

Malik James-King (born 28 June 1999) is a Jamaican hurdler. He became Jamaican national champion over 400 metres hurdles in 2024.

== Early life ==
He attended Calabar High School in Kingston, Jamaica. He competed at the 2018 World Athletics U20 Championships in the 400m hurdles in Tampere.

== Career ==
2023

He competed for Jamaica in the mixed 4 × 400 m relay at the 2023 World Athletics Championships in Budapest.

2024

In April 2024, he was selected as part of the Jamaican team for the 2024 World Athletics Relays in Nassau, Bahamas. In May 2024, he was announced as one of five athletes to benefit from sponsorship by the Jamaican Olympic Association. That month, he ran a lifetime best of 48.39 seconds to win the men's 400m hurdles event at the Jamaica Athletics Invitational meet on 11 May 2024, beating a field including World Championship silver medalist Kyron McMaster. He made his Diamond League debut at the 2024 Prefontaine Classic in Eugene, Oregon, finishing fifth in 49.51 seconds.

In June 2024, he won the Jamaican Athletics Championships in the 400m hurdles, running a personal best 47.42 seconds in Kingston. On 12 July 2024, he finished fourth at the 2024 Herculis Diamond League event in Monaco.

He competed at the 2024 Summer Olympics in Paris in August 2024, in the 400 metres hurdles, reaching the semi-finals where he clipped the last hurdle and lost balance.

2025

At the 2025 Grand Slam Track in Miami on 2 May 2025, he ran 49.43 metres for the 400 metres hurdles to finish third in the race. He competed on 16 May 2025 at the 2025 Doha Diamond League. He finished third in the 400 metres hurdles final at the 2025 Jamaican Athletics Championships in 48.49 seconds. He was named in the Jamaican squad for the 2025 NACAC Championships in Freeport, The Bahamas, winning the silver medal in the 400 metres hurdles. Selected for the 2025 World Athletics Championships in Tokyo, Japan, in September 2025, he was a semi-finalist in the men's 400 metres hurdles.

2026

On 21 June 2026, he placed third overall in the 400 metres hurdles at the 2026 Jamaican Athletics Championships. He was named in the Jamaica team for the 2026 Central American and Caribbean Games.

== Statistics ==
Grand Slam Track results
Slam	Race group	Event	Pl.	Time	Prize money
2025 Kingston Slam	Long hurdles	400 m hurdles	4th	48.69	US$20,000
2025 Kingston Slam	Long hurdles	400 m	5th	46.57	US$20,000
2025 Miami Slam	Long hurdles	400 m hurdles	3rd	49.43	US$25,000
2025 Miami Slam	Long hurdles	400 m	5th	45.81	US$25,000
