= Ryan Zeze =

French sprinter (born 1998)

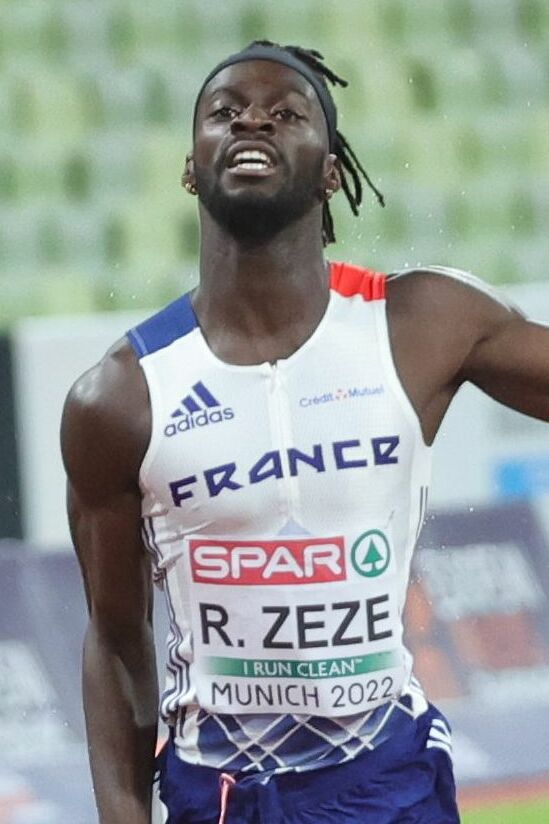
- Zeze in 2020

Personal information
- Nationality: French
- Born: 29 January 1998 (age 28) Louviers, France

Sport
- Sport: Athletics
- Events: 100 metres, 200 metres

Achievements and titles
- Personal bests: 100 m: 10.14 (Albi 2023); 200 m: 20.18 (Austin 2024); 400 m: 47.59 (Cergy-Pontoise 2022)
Medal record
Men's athletics
Representing France
European Championships
Silver medal – second place	2022 Munich	4×100 m relay
European Games
Gold medal – first place	2023 Kraków-Małopolska	200 m
Bronze medal – third place	2023 Kraków-Małopolska	4×100 m relay

Ryan Zeze (born 29 January 1998) is a French sprinter. He competed in the men's 4 × 100 metres relay event at the 2020 Summer Olympics.

Zeze also competed for France at the 2024 Summer Olympics.

== Statistics ==
Grand Slam Track results
Slam	Race group	Event	Pl.	Time	Prize money
2025 Miami Slam	Long sprints	200 m	5th	20.43	US$15,000
2025 Miami Slam	Long sprints	400 m	6th	45.21	US$15,000
