= Khallifah Rosser =

American hurlder

Personal information
- Born: July 13, 1995 (age 31)
- Home town: Fontana, California, United States
- Height: 6 ft 3 in (191 cm)

Sport
- Country: United States
- Sport: Track and field
- Event: 400 m hurdles
- College team: Cal State Los Angeles Golden Eagles

Achievements and titles
- Personal bests: 100 m: 10.83 (Los Angeles 2019); 200 m: 21.30 (Azusa 2021); 400 m: 45.74 (Norwalk 2016); 800 m: 1:51.95 (Los Angeles 2020); 400 mH: 47.65 (Eugene 2022)
Medal record
NACAC Championships
Gold medal – first place	2022 Freeport	4×400 m relay
Silver medal – second place	2022 Freeport	400 m hurdles

Khallifah Rosser (born July 13, 1995) is an American hurdler who specializes in the 400 metres hurdles. He qualified for the 400 metres hurdles at the 2022 World Athletics Championships after finishing third at the 2022 USA Outdoor Track and Field Championships.

== Statistics ==
Grand Slam Track results
Slam	Race group	Event	Pl.	Time	Prize money
2025 Miami Slam	Long hurdles	400 m hurdles	6th	49.97	US$15,000
2025 Miami Slam	Long hurdles	400 m	6th	46.99	US$15,000
