= 2025 Philadelphia Slam =

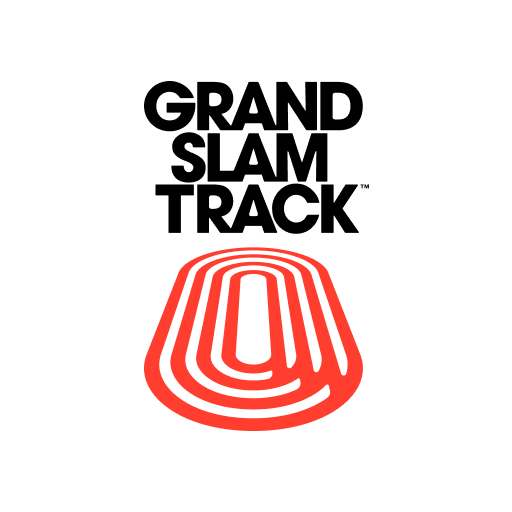
- Organisers: Grand Slam Track
- Dates: May 31 – June 1 2025
- Host city: Philadelphia, United States
- Venue: Franklin Field
- Events: 12
- Participation: 96 athletes
- Official website: Grand Slam Track

The 2025 Philadelphia Slam was an outdoor track and field meeting held from May 31 – June 1 2025 in Franklin Field, Philadelphia, United States. It was the third meet of the 2025 Grand Slam Track season, the debut season of Michael Johnson's Grand Slam Track league.

This meeting had a condensed schedule compared to the 2 previous meetings, moving from a 3-day event to a 2-day event. Another change occurred in the long distance category for both men and women, which was changed to be single race, with athletes now only running the 3000 metres for half the prize money.

== Results ==
Key: (R) = Racer / (C) = Challenger

=== Slam winners ===
Race group	Men	Women
Short Sprints	Kenny Bednarek (USA) (R)	Melissa Jefferson-Wooden (USA) (R)
Short Hurdles	Jamal Britt (USA) (C)	Ackera Nugent (JAM) (R)
Long Sprints	Matthew Hudson-Smith (GBR) (R)	Marileidy Paulino (DOM) (R)
Long Hurdles	Trevor Bassitt (USA) (C)	Jasmine Jones (USA) (R)
Short Distance	Marco Arop (CAN) (R)	Diribe Welteji (ETH) (R)
Long Distance	Nico Young (USA) (C)	Agnes Jebet Ngetich (KEN) (R)

=== Men's results ===
==== Short sprints ====
The 100 metres race was held on 1 June, starting at 17:22 (UTC−4).

100 Metres
Place	Athlete	Nation	Time	Points	Notes
1	Kenny Bednarek (R)	United States	9.86	12	CR, PB, =WL
2	Bryan Levell (C)	Jamaica	10.02	8	SB
3	Zharnel Hughes (R)	Great Britain	10.05	6	SB
4	Christian Coleman (C)	United States	10.12	5	
5	Andre De Grasse (C)	Canada	10.15	4	
6	Udodi Onwuzurike (C)	Nigeria	10.20	3	=SB
7	Aaron Brown (C)	Canada	10.20	2	
—	Christian Miller (C)	United States	DNS	—	
			Wind: (+0.8 m/s)		

The 200 metres race was held on 31 May, starting at 17:07 (UTC−4).

200 Metres
Place	Athlete	Nation	Time	Points	Notes
1	Kenny Bednarek (R)	United States	19.95	12	
2	Zharnel Hughes (R)	Great Britain	20.50	8	
3	Aaron Brown (C)	Canada	20.50	6	
4	Andre De Grasse (C)	Canada	20.58	5	
5	Bryan Levell (C)	Jamaica	20.63	4	
6	Christian Coleman (C)	United States	20.66	3	
7	Udodi Onwuzurike (C)	Nigeria	20.67	2	
8	Christian Miller (C)	United States	20.73	1	SB
			Wind: (±0.0 m/s)		

Race group summary
Place	Athlete	Nation	Points	Prize
1st place, gold medalist(s)	Kenny Bednarek (R)	United States	24	$100,000.00
2nd place, silver medalist(s)	Zharnel Hughes (R)	Great Britain	14	$50,000.00
3rd place, bronze medalist(s)	Bryan Levell (C)	Jamaica	12	$30,000.00
4	Andre De Grasse (C)	Canada	9	$25,000.00
5	Aaron Brown (C)	Canada	8	$20,000.00
6	Christian Coleman (C)	United States	8	$15,000.00
7	Udodi Onwuzurike (C)	Nigeria	5	$12,500.00
8	Christian Miller (C)	United States	1	$10,000.00

==== Short hurdles ====
The 110mH race was held on 31 May, starting at 18:13 (UTC−4).

110 Metres hurdles
Place	Athlete	Nation	Time	Points	Notes
1	Jamal Britt (C)	United States	13.08	12	SB
2	Cordell Tinch (C)	United States	13.10	8	
3	Trey Cunningham (C)	United States	13.18	6	
4	Daniel Roberts (R)	United States	13.30	5	SB
5	Lorenzo Simonelli (C)	Italy	13.55	4	
6	Freddie Crittenden (R)	United States	13.58	3	
7	Eric Edwards Jr. (C)	United States	13.66	2	
8	Jakub Szymanski (C)	Poland	13.67	1	
			Wind: (+0.7 m/s)		

The 100 metres race was held on 1 June, starting at 16:09 (UTC−4).

100 Metres
Place	Athlete	Nation	Time	Points	Notes
1	Trey Cunningham (C)	United States	10.36	12	
2	Jamal Britt (C)	United States	10.50	8	
3	Lorenzo Simonelli (C)	Italy	10.52	6	
4	Cordell Tinch (C)	United States	10.57	5	PB
5	Eric Edwards Jr. (C)	United States	10.90	4	
6	Jakub Szymanski (C)	Poland	10.93	3	PB
7	Freddie Crittenden (R)	United States	10.96	2	
—	Daniel Roberts (R)	United States	DNS	—	
			Wind: (−1.9 m/s)		

Race group summary
Place	Athlete	Nation	Points	Prize
1st place, gold medalist(s)	Jamal Britt (C)	United States	20	$100,000.00
2nd place, silver medalist(s)	Trey Cunningham (C)	United States	18	$50,000.00
3rd place, bronze medalist(s)	Cordell Tinch (C)	United States	13	$30,000.00
4	Lorenzo Simonelli (C)	Italy	10	$25,000.00
5	Eric Edwards Jr. (C)	United States	6	$20,000.00
6	Daniel Roberts (R)	United States	5	$15,000.00
7	Freddie Crittenden (R)	United States	5	$12,500.00
8	Jakub Szymanski (C)	Poland	4	$10,000.00

==== Long sprints ====
The 200 metres race was held on 1 June, starting at 16:52 (UTC−4).

200 Metres
Place	Athlete	Nation	Time	Points	Notes
1	Alexander Ogando (C)	Dominican Republic	20.13	12	
2	Jereem Richards (R)	Trinidad and Tobago	20.34	8	
3	Steven Gardiner (R)	Bahamas	20.49	6	
4	Muzala Samukonga (R)	Zambia	20.56	5	
5	Matthew Hudson-Smith (R)	Great Britain	20.70	4	
6	Khaleb McRae (C)	United States	20.87	3	
7	Matthew Boling (C)	United States	20.87	2	
8	Jevaughn Powell (C)	Jamaica	20.91	1	
			Wind: (+0.8 m/s)		

The 400 metres race was held on 31 May, starting at 17:51 (UTC−4).

400 Metres
Place	Athlete	Nation	Time	Points	Notes
1	Matthew Hudson-Smith (R)	Great Britain	44.51	12	
2	Khaleb McRae (C)	United States	45.04	8	
3	Jereem Richards (R)	Trinidad and Tobago	45.05	6	
4	Muzala Samukonga (R)	Zambia	45.10	5	
5	Matthew Boling (C)	United States	45.21	4	
6	Alexander Ogando (C)	Dominican Republic	45.87	3	
7	Jevaughn Powell (C)	Jamaica	46.08	2	SB
8	Steven Gardiner (R)	Bahamas	46.88	1	

Race group summary
Place	Athlete	Nation	Points	Prize
1st place, gold medalist(s)	Matthew Hudson-Smith (R)	Great Britain	16	$100,000.00
2nd place, silver medalist(s)	Alexander Ogando (C)	Dominican Republic	15	$50,000.00
3rd place, bronze medalist(s)	Jereem Richards (R)	Trinidad and Tobago	14	$30,000.00
4	Khaleb McRae (C)	United States	11	$25,000.00
5	Muzala Samukonga (R)	Zambia	10	$20,000.00
6	Steven Gardiner (R)	Bahamas	7	$15,000.00
7	Matthew Boling (C)	United States	6	$12,500.00
8	Jevaughn Powell (C)	Jamaica	3	$10,000.00

==== Long hurdles ====
The 400mH race was held on 31 May, starting at 16:48 (UTC−4).

400 Metres hurdles
Place	Athlete	Nation	Time	Points	Notes
1	Alison dos Santos (R)	Brazil	48.11	12	
2	Trevor Bassitt (C)	United States	48.25	8	SB
3	Chris Robinson (C)	United States	48.76	6	SB
4	Caleb Dean (R)	United States	49.48	5	
5	CJ Allen (C)	United States	49.61	4	
6	Assinie Wilson (C)	Jamaica	49.68	3	
7	Gerald Drummond (C)	Costa Rica	50.39	2	
8	Clément Ducos (R)	France	50.53	1	

The 400 metres race was held on 1 June, starting at 15:41 (UTC−4).

400 Metres
Place	Athlete	Nation	Time	Points	Notes
1	Trevor Bassitt (C)	United States	45.47	12	
2	Chris Robinson (C)	United States	45.62	8	
3	Alison dos Santos (R)	Brazil	45.63	6	
4	Caleb Dean (R)	United States	46.01	5	
5	Assinie Wilson (C)	Jamaica	46.01	4	SB
6	Gerald Drummond (C)	Costa Rica	47.37	3	
7	Clément Ducos (R)	France	47.59	2	
8	CJ Allen (C)	United States	48.34	1	

Race group summary
Place	Athlete	Nation	Points	Prize
1st place, gold medalist(s)	Trevor Bassitt (C)	United States	20	$100,000.00
2nd place, silver medalist(s)	Alison dos Santos (R)	Brazil	18	$50,000.00
3rd place, bronze medalist(s)	Chris Robinson (C)	United States	14	$30,000.00
4	Caleb Dean (R)	United States	10	$25,000.00
5	Assinie Wilson (C)	Jamaica	7	$20,000.00
6	CJ Allen (C)	United States	5	$15,000.00
7	Gerald Drummond (C)	Costa Rica	5	$12,500.00
8	Clément Ducos (R)	France	3	$10,000.00

==== Short distance ====
The 800 metres race was held on 31 May, starting at 16:57 (UTC−4).

800 Metres
Place	Athlete	Nation	Time	Points	Notes
1	Marco Arop (R)	Canada	1:43.38	12	CR, SB
2	Josh Hoey (C)	United States	1:44.41	8	
3	Yared Nuguse (R)	United States	1:45.36	6	
4	Hobbs Kessler (C)	United States	1:45.60	5	
5	Josh Kerr (R)	Great Britain	1:45.80	4	
6	Cole Hocker (R)	United States	1:45.81	3	
7	Samuel Chapple (C)	Netherlands	1:46.07	2	
8	Elliot Giles (C)	Great Britain	1:46.73	1	

The 1500 metres race was held on 1 June, starting at 17:13 (UTC−4).

1500 Metres
Place	Athlete	Nation	Time	Points	Notes
1	Josh Kerr (R)	Great Britain	3:34.44	12	CR, SB
2	Cole Hocker (R)	United States	3:34.51	8	SB
3	Hobbs Kessler (C)	United States	3:34.91	6	
4	Marco Arop (R)	Canada	3:35.38	5	PB
5	Josh Hoey (C)	United States	3:35.45	4	
6	Yared Nuguse (R)	United States	3:35.59	3	
7	Samuel Chapple (C)	Netherlands	3:37.33	2	
8	Elliot Giles (C)	Great Britain	3:39.92	1	

Race group summary
Place	Athlete	Nation	Points	Prize
1st place, gold medalist(s)	Marco Arop (R)	Canada	17	$100,000.00
2nd place, silver medalist(s)	Josh Kerr (R)	Great Britain	16	$50,000.00
3rd place, bronze medalist(s)	Josh Hoey (C)	United States	12	$30,000.00
4	Cole Hocker (R)	United States	11	$25,000.00
5	Hobbs Kessler (C)	United States	11	$20,000.00
6	Yared Nuguse (R)	United States	9	$15,000.00
7	Samuel Chapple (C)	Netherlands	4	$12,500.00
8	Elliot Giles (C)	Great Britain	2	$10,000.00

==== Long distance ====
The 3000 metres race was held on 1 June, starting at 16:27 (UTC−4).

3000 Metres
Place	Athlete	Nation	Time	Points	Notes
1	Nico Young (C)	United States	8:01.03	12	
2	Sam Gilman (C)	United States	8:01.70	8	
3	Ky Robinson (C)	Australia	8:01.92	6	
4	Andrew Coscoran (C)	Ireland	8:02.17	5	
5	Graham Blanks (C)	United States	8:03.22	4	
6	Edwin Kurgat (C)	Kenya	8:04.18	3	
7	Ronald Kwemoi (R)	Kenya	8:06.03	2	

Race group summary
Place	Athlete	Nation	Points	Prize
1st place, gold medalist(s)	Nico Young (C)	United States	12	$50,000.00
2nd place, silver medalist(s)	Sam Gilman (C)	United States	8	$25,000.00
3rd place, bronze medalist(s)	Ky Robinson (C)	Australia	6	$15,000.00
4	Andrew Coscoran (C)	Ireland	5	$12,500.00
5	Graham Blanks (C)	United States	4	$10,000.00
6	Edwin Kurgat (C)	Kenya	3	$7,500.00
7	Ronald Kwemoi (R)	Kenya	2	$6,250.00

=== Women's results ===
==== Short sprints ====
The 100 metres race was held on 1 June, starting at 17:13 (UTC−4).

100 Metres
Place	Athlete	Nation	Time	Points	Notes
1	Melissa Jefferson-Wooden (R)	United States	10.73	12	CR, PB, WL
2	Tamari Davis (C)	United States	11.03	8	
3	Thelma Davies (C)	Liberia	11.14	6	
4	Gabby Thomas (R)	United States	11.16	5	
5	Dina Asher-Smith (C)	Great Britain	11.16	4	
6	Celera Barnes (C)	United States	11.21	3	
7	Jadyn Mays (C)	United States	11.25	2	
8	Jenna Prandini (C)	United States	11.28	1	
			Wind: (+1.3 m/s)		

The 200 metres race was held on 31 May, starting at 17:16 (UTC−4).

200 Metres
Place	Athlete	Nation	Time	Points	Notes
1	Melissa Jefferson-Wooden (R)	United States	21.99	12	PB
2	Gabby Thomas (R)	United States	22.10	8	
3	Tamari Davis (C)	United States	22.59	6	
4	Dina Asher-Smith (C)	Great Britain	22.65	5	
5	Jadyn Mays (C)	United States	22.80	4	
6	Jenna Prandini (C)	United States	22.82	3	SB
7	Celera Barnes (C)	United States	22.89	2	PB
8	Thelma Davies (C)	Liberia	22.91	1	
			Wind: (+1.1 m/s)		

Race group summary
Place	Athlete	Nation	Points	Prize
1st place, gold medalist(s)	Melissa Jefferson-Wooden (R)	United States	24	$100,000.00
2nd place, silver medalist(s)	Tamari Davis (C)	United States	14	$50,000.00
3rd place, bronze medalist(s)	Gabby Thomas (R)	United States	13	$30,000.00
4	Dina Asher-Smith (C)	Great Britain	9	$25,000.00
5	Thelma Davies (C)	Liberia	7	$20,000.00
6	Jadyn Mays (C)	United States	6	$15,000.00
7	Celera Barnes (C)	United States	5	$12,500.00
8	Jenna Prandini (C)	United States	4	$10,000.00

==== Short hurdles ====
The 100mH race was held on 31 May, starting at 16:22 (UTC−4).

100 Metres hurdles
Place	Athlete	Nation	Time	Points	Notes
1	Ackera Nugent (R)	Jamaica	12.44	12	
2	Tia Jones (C)	United States	12.60	8	
3	Megan Tapper (C)	Jamaica	12.66	6	
4	Tonea Marshall (C)	United States	12.68	5	
5	Sydney McLaughlin-Levrone (R)	United States	12.70	4	
6	Ditaji Kambundji (C)	Switzerland	12.79	3	
7	Danielle Williams (C)	Jamaica	12.84	2	
8	Christina Clemons (C)	United States	12.96	1	
			Wind: (−0.4 m/s)		

The 100 metres race was held on 1 June, starting at 16:18 (UTC−4).

100 Metres
Place	Athlete	Nation	Time	Points	Notes
1	Ackera Nugent (R)	Jamaica	11.11	12	
2	Sydney McLaughlin-Levrone (R)	United States	11.21	8	
3	Ditaji Kambundji (C)	Switzerland	11.41	6	PB
4	Danielle Williams (C)	Jamaica	11.44	5	SB
5	Tonea Marshall (C)	United States	11.48	4	PB
6	Megan Tapper (C)	Jamaica	11.52	3	
7	Tia Jones (C)	United States	11.66	2	
8	Christina Clemons (C)	United States	11.94	1	
			Wind: (±0.0 m/s)		

Race group summary
Place	Athlete	Nation	Points	Prize
1st place, gold medalist(s)	Ackera Nugent (R)	Jamaica	24	$100,000.00
2nd place, silver medalist(s)	Sydney McLaughlin-Levrone (R)	United States	12	$50,000.00
3rd place, bronze medalist(s)	Tia Jones (C)	United States	10	$30,000.00
4	Megan Tapper (C)	Jamaica	9	$25,000.00
5	Ditaji Kambundji (C)	Switzerland	9	$20,000.00
6	Tonea Marshall (C)	United States	9	$15,000.00
7	Danielle Williams (C)	Jamaica	7	$12,500.00
8	Christina Clemons (C)	United States	2	$10,000.00

==== Long sprints ====
The 200 metres race was held on 1 June, starting at 16:34 (UTC−4).

200 Metres
Place	Athlete	Nation	Time	Points	Notes
1	Marileidy Paulino (R)	Dominican Republic	22.46	12	
2	Isabella Whittaker (C)	United States	22.82	8	
3	Jessika Gbai (C)	Ivory Coast	22.85	6	SB
4	Salwa Eid Naser (R)	Bahrain	22.90	5	
5	Nickisha Pryce (R)	Jamaica	22.96	4	
5	Alexis Holmes (R)	United States	22.97	3	
6	Sharlene Mawdsley (C)	Ireland	23.24	2	
7	Laviai Nielsen (C)	Great Britain	23.34	1	SB
			Wind: (+1.6 m/s)		

The 400 metres race was held on 31 May, starting at 17:42 (UTC−4).

400 Metres
Place	Athlete	Nation	Time	Points	Notes
1	Marileidy Paulino (R)	Dominican Republic	49.12	12	SB
2	Nickisha Pryce (R)	Jamaica	50.04	8	SB
3	Isabella Whittaker (C)	United States	50.16	6	
4	Alexis Holmes (R)	United States	51.02	5	
5	Sharlene Mawdsley (C)	Ireland	51.12	4	SB
6	Laviai Nielsen (C)	Great Britain	52.01	3	
7	Jessika Gbai (C)	Ivory Coast	52.54	2	SB
—	Salwa Eid Naser (R)	Bahrain	DQ	—	

Race group summary
Place	Athlete	Nation	Points	Prize
1st place, gold medalist(s)	Marileidy Paulino (R)	Dominican Republic	24	$100,000.00
2nd place, silver medalist(s)	Isabella Whittaker (C)	United States	14	$50,000.00
3rd place, bronze medalist(s)	Nickisha Pryce (R)	Jamaica	12	$30,000.00
4	Jessika Gbai (C)	Ivory Coast	8	$25,000.00
5	Alexis Holmes (R)	United States	8	$20,000.00
6	Sharlene Mawdsley (C)	Ireland	6	$15,000.00
7	Salwa Eid Naser (R)	Bahrain	5	$12,500.00
8	Laviai Nielsen (C)	Great Britain	4	$10,000.00

==== Long hurdles ====
The 400mH race was held on 31 May, starting at 16:39 (UTC−4).

400 Metres hurdles
Place	Athlete	Nation	Time	Points	Notes
1	Anna Cockrell (C)	United States	54.04	12	
2	Jasmine Jones (R)	United States	54.65	8	
3	Andrenette Knight (C)	Jamaica	54.86	6	
4	Dalilah Muhammad (C)	United States	54.88	5	
5	Rushell Clayton (R)	Jamaica	55.14	4	
6	Lina Nielsen (C)	Great Britain	57.14	3	
7	Ayomide Folorunso (C)	Italy	57.90	2	
—	Shamier Little (R)	United States	DNF	1	

The 400 metres race was held on 1 June, starting at 15:50 (UTC−4).

400 Metres
Place	Athlete	Nation	Time	Points	Notes
1	Lina Nielsen (C)	Great Britain	52.60	12	
2	Jasmine Jones (R)	United States	52.73	8	
3	Andrenette Knight (C)	Jamaica	52.87	6	
4	Rushell Clayton (R)	Jamaica	53.17	5	
5	Dalilah Muhammad (C)	United States	53.29	4	
6	Anna Cockrell (C)	United States	53.35	3	
7	Ayomide Folorunso (C)	Italy	53.88	2	

Race group summary
Place	Athlete	Nation	Points	Prize
1st place, gold medalist(s)	Jasmine Jones (R)	United States	16	$100,000.00
2nd place, silver medalist(s)	Anna Cockrell (C)	United States	15	$50,000.00
3rd place, bronze medalist(s)	Lina Nielsen (C)	Great Britain	15	$30,000.00
4	Andrenette Knight (C)	Jamaica	12	$25,000.00
5	Dalilah Muhammad (C)	United States	9	$20,000.00
6	Rushell Clayton (R)	Jamaica	9	$15,000.00
7	Ayomide Folorunso (C)	Italy	4	$12,500.00

==== Short distance ====
The 800 metres race was held on 1 June, starting at 15:59 (UTC−4).

800 Metres
Place	Athlete	Nation	Time	Points	Notes
1	Diribe Welteji (R)	Ethiopia	1:58.94	12	
2	Georgia Hunter Bell (C)	Great Britain	1:58.94	8	
3	Jessica Hull (R)	Australia	1:59.63	6	
4	Abbey Caldwell (C)	Australia	2:00.57	5	
5	Mary Moraa (R)	Kenya	2:00.92	4	
6	Addy Wiley (C)	United States	2:00.92	3	
7	Nikki Hiltz (R)	United States	2:00.93	2	
8	Nia Akins (C)	United States	2:13.07	1	

The 1500 metres race was held on 31 May, starting at 18:00 (UTC−4).

1500 Metres
Place	Athlete	Nation	Time	Points	Notes
1	Diribe Welteji (R)	Ethiopia	3:58.04	12	CR, SB
2	Jessica Hull (R)	Australia	3:58.36	8	SB
3	Nikki Hiltz (R)	United States	4:00.54	6	SB
4	Georgia Hunter Bell (C)	Great Britain	4:00.85	5	
5	Abbey Caldwell (C)	Australia	4:01.54	4	SB
6	Addy Wiley (C)	United States	4:07.41	3	
7	Mary Moraa (R)	Kenya	4:25.79	2	
—	Nia Akins (C)	United States	DNF	—	

Race group summary
Place	Athlete	Nation	Points	Prize
1st place, gold medalist(s)	Diribe Welteji (R)	Ethiopia	24	$100,000.00
2nd place, silver medalist(s)	Jessica Hull (R)	Australia	14	$50,000.00
3rd place, bronze medalist(s)	Georgia Hunter Bell (C)	Great Britain	13	$30,000.00
4	Abbey Caldwell (C)	Australia	9	$25,000.00
5	Nikki Hiltz (R)	United States	8	$20,000.00
6	Mary Moraa (R)	Kenya	6	$15,000.00
7	Addy Wiley (C)	United States	6	$12,500.00
8	Nia Akins (C)	United States	1	$10,000.00

==== Long distance ====
The 3000 metres race was held on 31 May, starting at 17:25 (UTC−4).

3000 Metres
Place	Athlete	Nation	Time	Points	Notes
1	Agnes Jebet Ngetich (R)	Kenya	8:43.61	12	
2	Ejgayehu Taye (C)	Ethiopia	8:43.70	8	
3	Josette Andrews (C)	United States	8:44.70	6	
4	Weini Kelati (C)	United States	8:45.31	5	
5	Elise Cranny (R)	United States	8:45.44	4	
6	Medina Eisa (C)	Ethiopia	8:48.26	3	
7	Nozomi Tanaka (R)	Japan	8:51.64	2	
8	Tsigie Gebreselama (R)	Ethiopia	8:57.64	1	

Race group summary
Place	Athlete	Nation	Points	Prize
1st place, gold medalist(s)	Agnes Jebet Ngetich (R)	Kenya	12	$50,000.00
2nd place, silver medalist(s)	Ejgayehu Taye (C)	Ethiopia	8	$25,000.00
3rd place, bronze medalist(s)	Josette Andrews (C)	United States	6	$15,000.00
4	Weini Kelati (C)	United States	5	$12,500.00
5	Elise Cranny (R)	United States	4	$10,000.00
6	Medina Eisa (C)	Ethiopia	3	$7,500.00
7	Nozomi Tanaka (R)	Japan	2	$6,250.00
8	Tsigie Gebreselama (R)	Ethiopia	1	$5,000.00

== See also ==
- 2025 Grand Slam Track season
- 2025 Diamond League
