= 2025 Miami Slam =

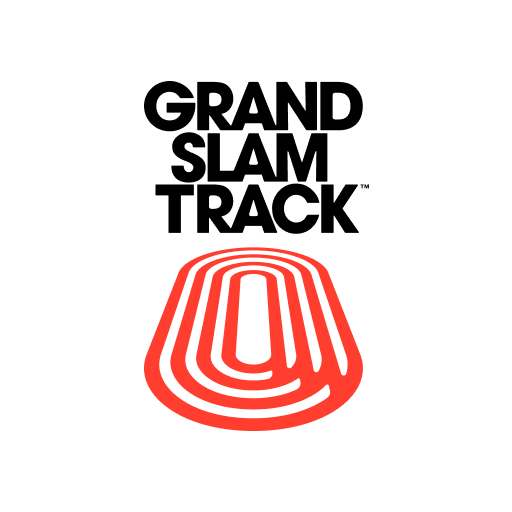
- Organisers: Grand Slam Track
- Dates: 2–4 May 2025
- Host city: Miami, United States
- Venue: Ansin Sports Complex
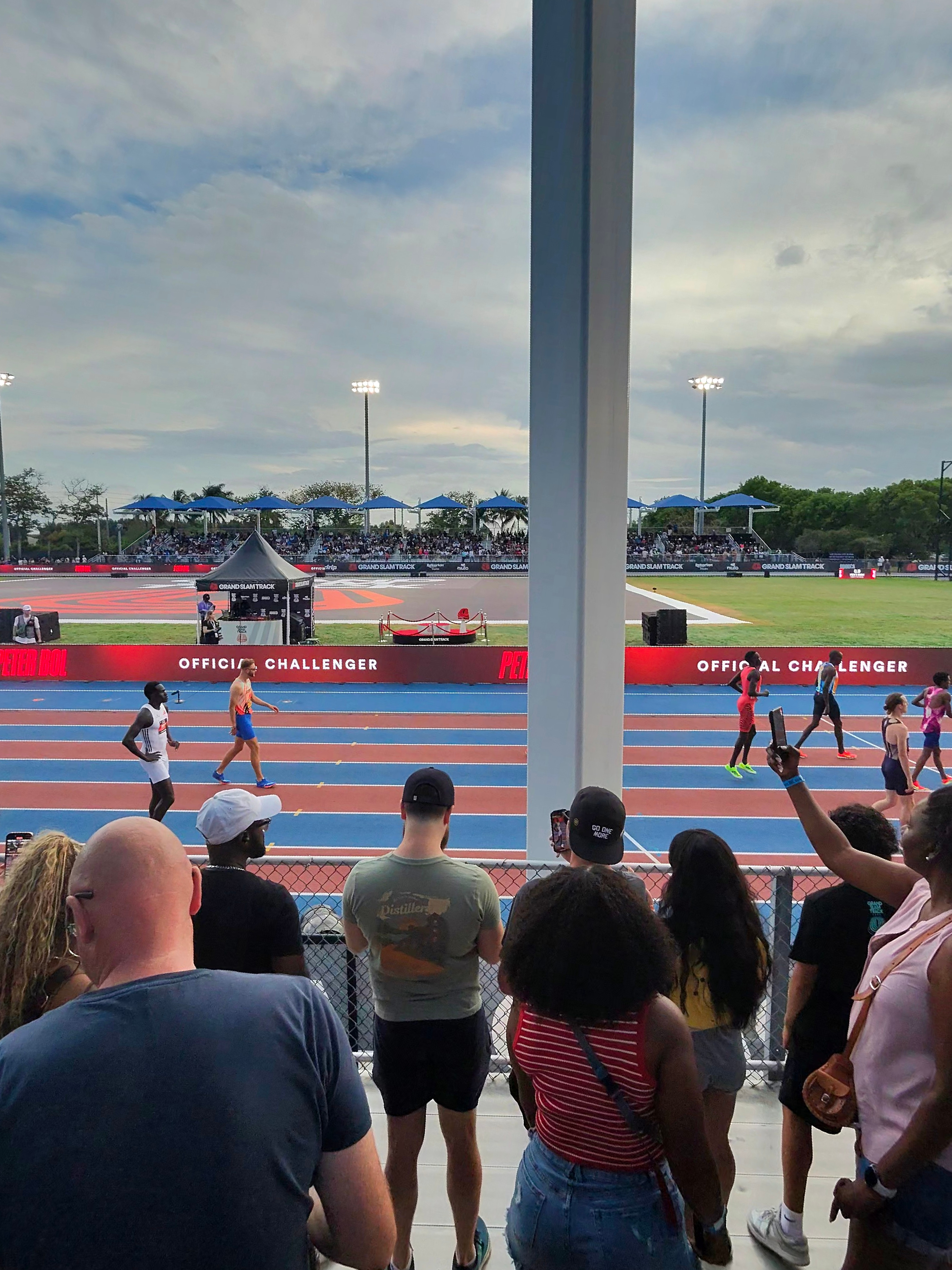
- Events: 12
- Participation: 96 athletes
- Official website: Grand Slam Track

The 2025 Miami Slam is an outdoor track and field meeting held from 2–4 May 2025 in Ansin Sports Complex, Miami, United States. It was the second meeting of the 2025 Grand Slam Track season, the debut season of Michael Johnson's Grand Slam Track league.

Fred Kerley did not compete at the Miami slam due to being arrested and charged with battery on May 1, 2025. He was replaced by Brandon Hicklin.

== Slam winners ==
Key: (R) = Racer / (C) = Challenger

Race group	Men	Women
Short Sprints	Kenny Bednarek (USA) (R)	Melissa Jefferson-Wooden (USA) (R)
Short Hurdles	Trey Cunningham (USA) (C)	Ackera Nugent (JAM) (R)
Long Sprints	Jereem Richards (TTO) (R)	Marileidy Paulino (DOM) (R)
Long Hurdles	Alison dos Santos (BRA) (R)	Sydney McLaughlin-Levrone (USA) (R)
Short Distance	Josh Kerr (GBR) (R)	Freweyni Hailu (ETH) (C)
Long Distance	Grant Fisher (USA) (R)	Agnes Jebet Ngetich (KEN) (R)

== Men's results ==
=== Short sprints ===
The 100 metres race was held on 3 May, starting at 18:53 (UTC−4).

100 Metres
Place	Athlete	Nation	Time	Points	Notes
1	Kenny Bednarek (R)	United States	9.79	12	
2	Oblique Seville (R)	Jamaica	9.84	8	
3	Ackeem Blake (C)	Jamaica	9.85	6	
4	Zharnel Hughes (R)	Great Britain	9.87	5	
5	Brandon Hicklin (C)	United States	9.98	4	
6	Benjamin Richardson (C)	South Africa	9.99	3	
7	Jerome Blake (C)	Canada	10.04	2	
8	Andre De Grasse (C)	Canada	10.05	1	
			Wind: (+2.4 m/s)		

The 200 metres race was held on 4 May, starting at 17:21 (UTC−4).

200 Metres
Place	Athlete	Nation	Time	Points	Notes
1	Kenny Bednarek (R)	United States	19.84	12	CR, WL
2	Zharnel Hughes (R)	Great Britain	20.13	8	SB
3	Oblique Seville (R)	Jamaica	20.13	6	PB
4	Andre De Grasse (C)	Canada	20.23	5	SB
5	Brandon Hicklin (C)	United States	20.40	4	PB
6	Jerome Blake (C)	Canada	20.40	3	
7	Benjamin Richardson (C)	South Africa	20.62	2	
8	Ackeem Blake (C)	Jamaica	21.09	1	
			Wind: (+0.2 m/s)		

Race group summary
Place	Athlete	Nation	Points	Prize
1st place, gold medalist(s)	Kenny Bednarek (R)	United States	24	$100,000.00
2nd place, silver medalist(s)	Oblique Seville (R)	Jamaica	14	$50,000.00
3rd place, bronze medalist(s)	Zharnel Hughes (R)	Great Britain	13	$30,000.00
4	Brandon Hicklin (C)	United States	8	$25,000.00
5	Ackeem Blake (C)	Jamaica	7	$20,000.00
6	Andre De Grasse (C)	Canada	6	$15,000.00
7	Jerome Blake (C)	Canada	5	$12,500.00
8	Benjamin Richardson (C)	South Africa	5	$10,000.00

=== Short hurdles ===
The 110mH race was held on 3 May, starting at 18:39 (UTC−4).

110 Metres hurdles
Place	Athlete	Nation	Time	Points	Notes
1	Trey Cunningham (C)	United States	13.00	12	CR, =PB
2	Sasha Zhoya (R)	France	13.06	8	PB
3	Freddie Crittenden (R)	United States	13.09	6	SB
4	Jamal Britt (C)	United States	13.10	5	SB
5	Dylan Beard (C)	United States	13.24	4	
6	Daniel Roberts (R)	United States	13.36	3	
7	Michael Obasuyi (C)	Belgium	13.41	2	
8	Wilhem Belocian (C)	France	13.47	1	
			Wind: (+1.4 m/s)		

The 100 metres race was held on 4 May, starting at 15:55 (UTC−4).

100 Metres
Place	Athlete	Nation	Time	Points	Notes
1	Trey Cunningham (C)	United States	10.17	12	PB
2	Jamal Britt (C)	United States	10.20	8	=PB
3	Sasha Zhoya (R)	France	10.36	6	PB
4	Daniel Roberts (R)	United States	10.40	5	PB
5	Dylan Beard (C)	United States	10.63	4	
6	Michael Obasuyi (C)	Belgium	10.67	3	
7	Freddie Crittenden (R)	United States	10.68	2	PB
—	Wilhem Belocian (C)	France	DNS		
			Wind: (+0.7 m/s)		

Race group summary
Place	Athlete	Nation	Points	Prize
1st place, gold medalist(s)	Trey Cunningham (C)	United States	24	$100,000.00
2nd place, silver medalist(s)	Sasha Zhoya (R)	France	14	$50,000.00
3rd place, bronze medalist(s)	Jamal Britt (C)	United States	13	$30,000.00
4	Freddie Crittenden (R)	United States	8	$25,000.00
5	Daniel Roberts (R)	United States	8	$20,000.00
6	Dylan Beard (C)	United States	8	$15,000.00
7	Michael Obasuyi (C)	Belgium	5	$12,500.00
8	Wilhem Belocian (C)	France	1	$10,000.00

=== Long sprints ===
The 200 metres race was held on 2 May, starting at 18:40 (UTC−4).

200 Metres
Place	Athlete	Nation	Time	Points	Notes
1	Jereem Richards (R)	Trinidad and Tobago	19.86	12	CR, WL, SB
2	Alexander Ogando (C)	Dominican Republic	19.86	8	=NR
3	Muzala Samukonga (R)	Zambia	20.23	6	PB
4	Steven Gardiner (R)	Bahamas	20.37	5	SB
5	Ryan Zeze (C)	France	20.43	4	
6	Jacory Patterson (C)	United States	20.55	3	
7	Matthew Hudson-Smith (R)	Great Britain	20.64	2	SB
8	Bryce Deadmon (C)	United States	21.01	1	
			Wind: (+1.7 m/s)		

The 400 metres race was held on 3 May, starting at 17:56 (UTC−4).

400 Metres
Place	Athlete	Nation	Time	Points	Notes
1	Jacory Patterson (C)	United States	43.98	12	CR, WL, PB
2	Jereem Richards (R)	Trinidad and Tobago	44.32	8	SB
3	Matthew Hudson-Smith (R)	Great Britain	44.37	6	SB
4	Muzala Samukonga (R)	Zambia	44.56	5	SB
5	Alexander Ogando (C)	Dominican Republic	44.78	4	
6	Ryan Zeze (C)	France	45.21	3	PB
7	Bryce Deadmon (C)	United States	45.52	2	
—	Steven Gardiner (R)	Bahamas	DNF	—	

Race group summary
Place	Athlete	Nation	Points	Prize
1st place, gold medalist(s)	Jereem Richards (R)	Trinidad and Tobago	20	$100,000.00
2nd place, silver medalist(s)	Jacory Patterson (C)	United States	15	$50,000.00
3rd place, bronze medalist(s)	Alexander Ogando (C)	Dominican Republic	12	$30,000.00
4	Muzala Samukonga (R)	Zambia	11	$25,000.00
5	Matthew Hudson-Smith (R)	Great Britain	8	$20,000.00
6	Ryan Zeze (C)	France	7	$15,000.00
7	Steven Gardiner (R)	Bahamas	5	$12,500.00
8	Bryce Deadmon (C)	United States	3	$10,000.00

=== Long hurdles ===
The 400mH race was held on 2 May, starting at 18:06 (UTC−4).

400 Metres hurdles
Place	Athlete	Nation	Time	Points	Notes
1	Alison dos Santos (R)	Brazil	47.97	12	
2	Chris Robinson (C)	United States	48.92	8	SB
3	Malik James-King (C)	Jamaica	49.43	6	
4	Trevor Bassitt (C)	United States	49.49	5	
5	Caleb Dean (R)	United States	49.90	4	
6	Khallifah Rosser (C)	United States	49.97	3	SB
7	Ludvy Vaillant (C)	France	50.38	2	SB
—	Roshawn Clarke (R)	Jamaica	DNF	—	

The 400 metres race was held on 4 May, starting at 16:23 (UTC−4).

400 Metres
Place	Athlete	Nation	Time	Points	Notes
1	Alison dos Santos (R)	Brazil	44.53	12	PB
2	Chris Robinson (C)	United States	44.86	8	
3	Caleb Dean (R)	United States	45.18	6	PB
4	Trevor Bassitt (C)	United States	45.31	5	SB
5	Malik James-King (C)	Jamaica	45.81	4	SB
6	Khallifah Rosser (C)	United States	46.99	3	
7	Ludvy Vaillant (C)	France	47.22	2	
—	Roshawn Clarke (R)	Jamaica	DNS	—	

Race group summary
Place	Athlete	Nation	Points	Prize
1st place, gold medalist(s)	Alison dos Santos (R)	Brazil	24	$100,000.00
2nd place, silver medalist(s)	Chris Robinson (C)	United States	16	$50,000.00
3rd place, bronze medalist(s)	Caleb Dean (R)	United States	10	$30,000.00
4	Malik James-King (C)	Jamaica	10	$25,000.00
5	Trevor Bassitt (C)	United States	10	$20,000.00
6	Khallifah Rosser (C)	United States	6	$15,000.00
7	Ludvy Vaillant (C)	France	5	$12,500.00

=== Short distance ===
The 800 metres race was held on 3 May, starting at 19:05 (UTC−4).

800 Metres
Place	Athlete	Nation	Time	Points	Notes
1	Marco Arop (R)	Canada	1:43.69	12	CR, SB
2	Kethobogile Haingura (C)	Botswana	1:43.75	8	PB
3	Peter Bol (C)	Australia	1:44.13	6	
4	Yared Nuguse (R)	United States	1:44.77	5	PB
5	Josh Kerr (R)	Great Britain	1:45.01	4	PB
6	Cole Hocker (R)	United States	1:45.13	3	PB
7	Tshepo Tshite (C)	South Africa	1:45.36	2	
8	Timothy Cheruiyot (C)	Kenya	1:47.12	1	

The 1500 metres race was held on 2 May, starting at 17:51 (UTC−4).

1500 Metres
Place	Athlete	Nation	Time	Points	Notes
1	Josh Kerr (R)	Great Britain	3:34.51	12	CR, SB
2	Yared Nuguse (R)	United States	3:34.65	8	
3	Cole Hocker (R)	United States	3:34.79	6	SB
4	Kethobogile Haingura (C)	Botswana	3:35.21	5	PB
5	Peter Bol (C)	Australia	3:35.24	4	SB
6	Timothy Cheruiyot (C)	Kenya	3:35.61	3	
7	Marco Arop (R)	Canada	3:35.95	2	PB
8	Tshepo Tshite (C)	South Africa	3:36.28	1	

Race group summary
Place	Athlete	Nation	Points	Prize
1st place, gold medalist(s)	Josh Kerr (R)	Great Britain	16	$100,000.00
2nd place, silver medalist(s)	Marco Arop (R)	Canada	14	$50,000.00
3rd place, bronze medalist(s)	Kethobogile Haingura (C)	Botswana	13	$30,000.00
4	Yared Nuguse (R)	United States	13	$25,000.00
5	Peter Bol (C)	Australia	10	$20,000.00
6	Cole Hocker (R)	United States	9	$15,000.00
7	Timothy Cheruiyot (C)	Kenya	4	$12,500.00
8	Tshepo Tshite (C)	South Africa	3	$10,000.00

=== Long distance ===
The 3000 metres race was held on 2 May, starting at 19:01 (UTC−4).

3000 Metres
Place	Athlete	Nation	Time	Points	Notes
1	Andrew Coscoran (C)	Ireland	8:17.56	12	
2	Grant Fisher (R)	United States	8:17.60	8	
3	George Mills (C)	Great Britain	8:17.77	6	
4	Cooper Teare (C)	United States	8:18.08	5	
5	Dawit Seare (C)	Eritrea	8:18.73	4	
6	Ronald Kwemoi (R)	Kenya	8:19.48	3	
7	Amon Kemboi (C)	Kenya	8:20.16	2	
8	Sam Atkin (C)	Great Britain	8:21.35	1	

The 5000 metres race was held on 4 May, starting at 16:44 (UTC−4).

5000 Metres
Place	Athlete	Nation	Time	Points	Notes
1	Grant Fisher (R)	United States	13:40.32	12	CR
2	Cooper Teare (C)	United States	13:46.25	8	
3	Andrew Coscoran (C)	Ireland	13:46.30	6	
4	Ronald Kwemoi (R)	Kenya	13:46.35	5	SB
5	Sam Atkin (C)	Great Britain	13:47.84	4	
6	Amon Kemboi (C)	Kenya	13:50.64	3	
7	George Mills (C)	Great Britain	13:52.11	2	
8	Dawit Seare (C)	Eritrea	14:01.96	1	

Race group summary
Place	Athlete	Nation	Points	Prize
1st place, gold medalist(s)	Grant Fisher (R)	United States	20	$100,000.00
2nd place, silver medalist(s)	Andrew Coscoran (C)	Ireland	18	$50,000.00
3rd place, bronze medalist(s)	Cooper Teare (C)	United States	13	$30,000.00
4	George Mills (C)	Great Britain	8	$25,000.00
5	Ronald Kwemoi (R)	Kenya	8	$20,000.00
6	Sam Atkin (C)	Great Britain	5	$15,000.00
7	Dawit Seare (C)	Eritrea	5	$12,500.00
8	Amon Kemboi (C)	Kenya	5	$10,000.00

== Women's results ==
=== Short sprints ===
The 100 metres race was held on 2 May, starting at 18:52 (UTC−4).

100 Metres
Place	Athlete	Nation	Time	Points	Notes
1	Melissa Jefferson-Wooden (R)	United States	10.75	12	
2	Tamari Davis (C)	United States	10.79	8	
3	Favour Ofili (C)	Nigeria	10.94	6	
4	Gabby Thomas (R)	United States	10.97	5	
5	Jacious Sears (C)	United States	10.98	4	
6	Brittany Brown (R)	United States	11.06	3	
7	Kayla White (C)	United States	11.08	2	
8	Daryll Neita (R)	Great Britain	11.16	1	
			Wind: (+2.4 m/s)		

The 200 metres race was held on 3 May, starting at 19:21 (UTC−4).

200 Metres
Place	Athlete	Nation	Time	Points	Notes
1	Gabby Thomas (R)	United States	21.95	12	CR, SB
2	Tamari Davis (C)	United States	22.05	8	PB
3	Melissa Jefferson-Wooden (R)	United States	22.15	6	PB
4	Favour Ofili (C)	Nigeria	22.27	5	SB
5	Brittany Brown (R)	United States	22.72	4	
6	Kayla White (C)	United States	22.85	3	SB
7	Jacious Sears (C)	United States	22.89	2	SB
8	Daryll Neita (R)	Great Britain	22.93	1	
			Wind: (+ m/s)		

Race group summary
Place	Athlete	Nation	Points	Prize
1st place, gold medalist(s)	Melissa Jefferson-Wooden (R)	United States	18	$100,000.00
2nd place, silver medalist(s)	Gabby Thomas (R)	United States	17	$50,000.00
3rd place, bronze medalist(s)	Tamari Davis (C)	United States	16	$30,000.00
4	Favour Ofili (C)	Nigeria	11	$25,000.00
5	Brittany Brown (R)	United States	7	$20,000.00
6	Jacious Sears (C)	United States	6	$15,000.00
7	Kayla White (C)	United States	5	$12,500.00
8	Daryll Neita (R)	Great Britain	2	$10,000.00

=== Short hurdles ===
The 100mH race was held on 2 May, starting at 17:42 (UTC−4).

100 Metres hurdles
Place	Athlete	Nation	Time	Points	Notes
1	Masai Russell (R)	United States	12.17	12	CR, NR, WL
2	Tia Jones (C)	United States	12.19	8	PB
3	Ackera Nugent (R)	Jamaica	12.34	6	SB
4	Kendra Harrison (C)	United States	12.40	5	SB
5	Megan Tapper (C)	Jamaica	12.50	4	SB
6	Alaysha Johnson (C)	United States	12.56	3	
7	Maribel Caicedo (C)	Ecuador	13.12	2	SB
			Wind: (+2.0 m/s)		

The 100 metres race was held on 3 May, starting at 18:10 (UTC−4).

100 Metres
Place	Athlete	Nation	Time	Points	Notes
1	Ackera Nugent (R)	Jamaica	11.09	12	CR, =PB
2	Megan Tapper (C)	Jamaica	11.33	8	PB
3	Kendra Harrison (C)	United States	11.35	6	
4	Masai Russell (R)	United States	11.40	5	PB
5	Maribel Caicedo (C)	Ecuador	11.47	4	PB
6	Tia Jones (C)	United States	11.50	3	PB
—	Alaysha Johnson (C)	United States	DNS	—	
			Wind: (+0.9 m/s)		

Race group summary
Place	Athlete	Nation	Points	Prize
1st place, gold medalist(s)	Ackera Nugent (R)	Jamaica	18	$100,000.00
2nd place, silver medalist(s)	Masai Russell (R)	United States	17	$50,000.00
3rd place, bronze medalist(s)	Megan Tapper (C)	Jamaica	12	$30,000.00
4	Tia Jones (C)	United States	11	$25,000.00
5	Kendra Harrison (C)	United States	11	$20,000.00
6	Maribel Caicedo (C)	Ecuador	6	$15,000.00
7	Alaysha Johnson (C)	United States	3	$12,500.00

=== Long sprints ===
The 200 metres race was held on 4 May, starting at 16:35 (UTC−4).

200 Metres
Place	Athlete	Nation	Time	Points	Notes
1	Marileidy Paulino (R)	Dominican Republic	22.30	12	NR
2	Salwa Eid Naser (R)	Bahrain	22.53	8	
3	Isabella Whittaker (C)	United States	22.76	6	PB
4	Nickisha Pryce (R)	Jamaica	22.77	5	SB
5	Alexis Holmes (R)	United States	22.83	4	PB
6	Amber Anning (C)	Great Britain	22.97	3	
7	Stacey-Ann Williams (C)	Jamaica	22.98	2	
8	Kendall Ellis (C)	United States	23.03	1	
			Wind: (+1.0 m/s)		

The 400 metres race was held on 2 May, starting at 19:21 (UTC−4).

400 Metres
Place	Athlete	Nation	Time	Points	Notes
1	Marileidy Paulino (R)	Dominican Republic	49.21	12	SB
2	Salwa Eid Naser (R)	Bahrain	49.33	8	
3	Alexis Holmes (R)	United States	50.36	6	
4	Isabella Whittaker (C)	United States	50.38	5	
5	Nickisha Pryce (R)	Jamaica	50.71	4	SB
6	Stacey-Ann Williams (C)	Jamaica	50.76	3	
7	Amber Anning (C)	Great Britain	50.85	2	
8	Kendall Ellis (C)	United States	52.51	1	

Race group summary
Place	Athlete	Nation	Points	Prize
1st place, gold medalist(s)	Marileidy Paulino (R)	Dominican Republic	24	$100,000.00
2nd place, silver medalist(s)	Salwa Eid Naser (R)	Bahrain	16	$50,000.00
3rd place, bronze medalist(s)	Isabella Whittaker (C)	United States	11	$30,000.00
4	Alexis Holmes (R)	United States	10	$25,000.00
5	Nickisha Pryce (R)	Jamaica	9	$20,000.00
6	Stacey-Ann Williams (C)	Jamaica	5	$15,000.00
7	Amber Anning (C)	Great Britain	5	$12,500.00
8	Kendall Ellis (C)	United States	2	$10,000.00

=== Long hurdles ===
The 400mH race was held on 3 May, starting at 17:42 (UTC−4).

400 Metres hurdles
Place	Athlete	Nation	Time	Points	Notes
1	Sydney McLaughlin-Levrone (R)	United States	52.07	12	CR, WL
2	Andrenette Knight (C)	Jamaica	54.08	8	SB
3	Anna Hall (C)	United States	54.43	6	
4	Shiann Salmon (C)	Jamaica	54.62	5	SB
5	Sarah Carli (C)	Australia	54.93	4	
6	Cassandra Tate (C)	United States	55.94	3	
7	Naomi Van den Broeck (C)	Belgium	56.63	2	
8	Shamier Little (R)	United States	57.55	1	

The 400 metres race was held on 4 May, starting at 17:09 (UTC−4).

400 Metres
Place	Athlete	Nation	Time	Points	Notes
1	Sydney McLaughlin-Levrone (R)	United States	49.69	12	SB
2	Anna Hall (C)	United States	51.68	8	SB
3	Andrenette Knight (C)	Jamaica	51.80	6	SB
4	Shamier Little (R)	United States	51.84	5	
5	Shiann Salmon (C)	Jamaica	52.17	4	SB
6	Naomi Van den Broeck (C)	Belgium	52.26	3	SB
7	Sarah Carli (C)	Australia	53.01	2	SB
8	Cassandra Tate (C)	United States	53.55	1	

Race group summary
Place	Athlete	Nation	Points	Prize
1st place, gold medalist(s)	Sydney McLaughlin-Levrone (R)	United States	24	$100,000.00
2nd place, silver medalist(s)	Andrenette Knight (C)	Jamaica	14	$50,000.00
3rd place, bronze medalist(s)	Anna Hall (C)	United States	14	$30,000.00
4	Shiann Salmon (C)	Jamaica	9	$25,000.00
5	Shamier Little (R)	United States	6	$20,000.00
6	Sarah Carli (C)	Australia	6	$15,000.00
7	Naomi Van den Broeck (C)	Belgium	5	$12,500.00
8	Cassandra Tate (C)	United States	4	$10,000.00

=== Short distance ===
The 800 metres race was held on 4 May, starting at 15:42 (UTC−4).

800 Metres
Place	Athlete	Nation	Time	Points	Notes
1	Mary Moraa (R)	Kenya	1:59.51	12	SB
2	Nikki Hiltz (R)	United States	1:59.75	8	
3	Freweyni Hailu (C)	Ethiopia	1:59.84	6	
4	Diribe Welteji (R)	Ethiopia	1:59.94	5	
5	Jessica Hull (R)	Australia	2:00.88	4	
6	Shafiqua Maloney (C)	Saint Vincent and the Grenadines	2:00.96	3	
7	Emily Mackay (C)	United States	2:02.42	2	
8	Lucia Stafford (C)	Canada	2:04.93	1	

The 1500 metres race was held on 3 May, starting at 18:22 (UTC−4).

1500 Metres
Place	Athlete	Nation	Time	Points	Notes
1	Freweyni Hailu (C)	Ethiopia	4:06.96	12	
2	Nikki Hiltz (R)	United States	4:07.08	8	
3	Diribe Welteji (R)	Ethiopia	4:07.46	6	
4	Jessica Hull (R)	Australia	4:07.67	5	
5	Emily Mackay (C)	United States	4:10.93	4	
6	Shafiqua Maloney (C)	Saint Vincent and the Grenadines	4:14.66	3	
7	Lucia Stafford (C)	Canada	4:16.35	2	SB
8	Mary Moraa (R)	Kenya	4:24.44	1	

Race group summary
Place	Athlete	Nation	Points	Prize
1st place, gold medalist(s)	Freweyni Hailu (C)	Ethiopia	18	$100,000.00
2nd place, silver medalist(s)	Nikki Hiltz (R)	United States	16	$50,000.00
3rd place, bronze medalist(s)	Mary Moraa (R)	Kenya	13	$30,000.00
4	Diribe Welteji (R)	Ethiopia	11	$25,000.00
5	Jessica Hull (R)	Australia	9	$20,000.00
6	Emily Mackay (C)	United States	6	$15,000.00
7	Shafiqua Maloney (C)	Saint Vincent and the Grenadines	5	$12,500.00
8	Lucia Stafford (C)	Canada	4	$10,000.00

=== Long distance ===
The 3000 metres race was held on 4 May, starting at 16:04 (UTC−4).

3000 Metres
Place	Athlete	Nation	Time	Points	Notes
1	Hirut Meshesha (C)	Ethiopia	8:22.72	12	CR, PB
2	Medina Eisa (C)	Ethiopia	8:23.08	8	PB
3	Agnes Jebet Ngetich (R)	Kenya	8:23.14	6	PB
4	Tsigie Gebreselama (R)	Ethiopia	8:24.47	5	PB
5	Aynadis Mebratu (C)	Ethiopia	8:35.61	4	
6	Janeth Chepngetich (C)	Kenya	8:37.06	3	
7	Elise Cranny (R)	United States	8:42.30	2	
8	Nozomi Tanaka (R)	Japan	8:44.51	1	

The 5000 metres was held on 2 May, starting at 18:16 (UTC−4).

5000 Metres
Place	Athlete	Nation	Time	Points	Notes
1	Agnes Jebet Ngetich (R)	Kenya	14:25.80	12	CR, PB
2	Medina Eisa (C)	Ethiopia	14:25.92	8	
3	Hirut Meshesha (C)	Ethiopia	14:40.46	6	
4	Janeth Chepngetich (C)	Kenya	14:46.16	5	
5	Aynadis Mebratu (C)	Ethiopia	15:01.62	4	
6	Tsigie Gebreselama (R)	Ethiopia	15:03.21	3	SB
7	Nozomi Tanaka (R)	Japan	15:06.78	2	
8	Elise Cranny (R)	United States	15:15.31	1	SB

Race group summary
Place	Athlete	Nation	Points	Prize
1st place, gold medalist(s)	Agnes Jebet Ngetich (R)	Kenya	18	$100,000.00
2nd place, silver medalist(s)	Hirut Meshesha (C)	Ethiopia	18	$50,000.00
3rd place, bronze medalist(s)	Medina Eisa (C)	Ethiopia	16	$30,000.00
4	Janeth Chepngetich (C)	Kenya	8	$25,000.00
5	Tsigie Gebreselama (R)	Ethiopia	8	$20,000.00
6	Aynadis Mebratu (C)	Ethiopia	8	$15,000.00
7	Nozomi Tanaka (R)	Japan	3	$12,500.00
8	Elise Cranny (R)	United States	3	$10,000.00

== See also ==
- 2025 Grand Slam Track season
- 2025 Diamond League
