= Jamal Britt =

American athletics competitor

Personal information
- Nationality: American
- Born: December 28, 1998 (age 27)
- Home town: Las Vegas, Nevada
- Height: 6 ft 2 in (1.88 m)
- Weight: 180 lb (82 kg)

Sport
- Sport: Athletics
- Events: 60 metres hurdles, 110 metres hurdles
- College team: Iowa Hawkeyes; College of the Sequoias Giants
- Club: Unattached

Achievements and titles
- National finals: 2022 USA Indoors; • 60m hurdles, 5th; 2022 USA Champs; • 110m hurdles, 4th; 2023 USA Champs; • 110m hurdles, 6th
- Personal bests: 60 mH: 7.46 (New York City 2026); 110 mH: 12.86 (Eugene 2026)
Medal record
Men's athletics
Representing United States
NACAC
Silver medal – second place	2022	110 metres hurdles
NCAA Indoors
Silver medal – second place	2021	60 metres hurdles

Jamal Britt (born 28 December 1998) is an American track and field athlete who competes in the 60 metres hurdles and 110 metres hurdles. He was the 2022 NACAC silver medalist in the 110 m hurdles, only losing to a championship record performance by Freddie Crittenden.

== Biography ==
Britt first competed collegiately at College of the Sequoias before transferring to the University of Iowa. His first NCAA Championship appearance came in March 2021, where he finished 2nd in the 60 metres hurdles at the NCAA Division I Indoor Championships with a time of 7.52 seconds. Later that year, he finished fourth at the equivalent Outdoor Championships, running 13.45 s.

The following year, he competed at the USA Outdoor Championships, finishing fourth in a personal best of 13.09 s. At the NACAC Championships held in Freeport, Britt won silver in the 110 mH, improving his personal best to 13.08 s to finish behind Freddie Crittenden. On 12 September, he won the 110 mH at the Galà dei Castelli meet in Bellinzona, running 13.18 s.

On 31 May 2025, Britt equalled his personal best of 13.08 s to win the 110 mH at the Philadelphia Slam. He also ran 10.50 s for the flat 100 m to finish first overall in the short hurdles group. During the 2025 USA Outdoor Track and Field Championships, Britt made the final for the 110 mH but did not finish. At the Lausanne Diamond League on 20 August, he finished second behind Cordell Tinch, running a time of 13.13 s.

Britt finished third over 60 mH at the USA Indoor Championships on 28 February 2026, running a personal best of 7.46 s. In April, he improved his 110 mH personal best to 13.07 s to win at the Miramar Invitational. On 16 May, Britt won at the Shanghai Diamond League, equalling his personal best of 13.07 s to record his first ever Diamond League win. He also won at the Xiamen Diamond League on 23 May, once again equalling his personal best of 13.07 s. On 14 June, he won at the Los Angeles Grand Prix, improving his personal best to 12.99 s, breaking the 13-second barrier for the first time. He continued his breakout season by winning the Paris Diamond League on 28 June, improving his 110 mH personal best again to 12.89 s, becoming the equal eighth fastest man in the event. On 4 July 2026, Britt ran the 110mH at the Prefontaine Classic at Hayward Field. He won the race with 12.86 s for a meet record and another personal best.

== Statistics ==
=== Circuit performances ===
Grand Slam Track results
Slam	Race group	Event	Pl.	Time	Prize money
2025 Miami Slam	Short hurdles	110 m hurdles	4th	13.10	US$30,000
2025 Miami Slam	Short hurdles	100 m	2nd	10.20	US$30,000
2025 Philadelphia Slam	Short hurdles	110 m hurdles	1st	13.08	US$100,000
2025 Philadelphia Slam	Short hurdles	100 m	2nd	10.50	US$100,000

=== Personal bests ===
Event	Mark	Competition	Venue	Date
60 metres (indoor)	6.85	Tyson Invitational	Fayetteville, AR	11 February 2022
60 metres hurdles (indoor)	7.52	NCAA Indoors	Fayetteville, AR	13 March 2021
100 metres	10.20	Aggie Classic	Greensboro, North Carolina	19 April 2025
110 metres hurdles	12.86 (+1.8 m/s)	Prefontaine Classic	Eugene, Oregon	4 July 2026
400 metres hurdles	49.69	Big Ten Outdoor Track and Field Championships	Champaign, IL	16 May 2021

=== Major competitions ===
Year	Competition	Venue	Position	Event	Notes
2022	Puerto Rico International Athletics Classic	Ponce	3rd	110 metres hurdles	13.30 (−0.2 m/s)
2022	Irena Szewinska Memorial	Bydgoszcz	1st	110 metres hurdles	13.35 (−0.5 m/s)
2022	USATF Outdoors	Eugene, OR	4th	110 metres hurdles	13.09 (+1.2 m/s)
2022	NACAC Championships	Freeport, Bahamas	2nd	110 metres hurdles	13.08 (+0.3 m/s)
2023	London Diamond League	London	3rd	110 metres hurdles	13.25 (+1.3 m/s)
2026	Paris Diamond League	Paris	1st	110 metres hurdles	12.89 (+0.8 m/s)
