= Melissa Jefferson-Wooden =

American sprinter (born 2001)

Melissa Jefferson-Wooden OLY
- Jefferson in the 4 × 100 m at the 2024 World Athletics Relays

Personal information
- Born: Melissa Jefferson; February 21, 2001 (age 25) Georgetown, South Carolina, U.S.
- Height: 5 ft 4 in (162 cm)

Sport
- Country: United States
- Sport: Track and field
- Events: 60 metres 100 metres 200 metres
- College team: Coastal Carolina Chanticleers

Achievements and titles
- Personal bests: 60 m: 7.09 (2022); 100 m: 10.61 (2025); 200 m: 21.47 (2026)
Medal record
Women's athletics
Representing the United States
Olympic Games
Gold medal – first place	2024 Paris	4 × 100 m relay
Bronze medal – third place	2024 Paris	100 m
World Championships
Gold medal – first place	2022 Eugene	4 × 100 m relay
Gold medal – first place	2023 Budapest	4 × 100 m relay
Gold medal – first place	2025 Tokyo	100 m
Gold medal – first place	2025 Tokyo	200 m
Gold medal – first place	2025 Tokyo	4 × 100 m relay
World Ultimate Championship
First place	2026 Budapest	100 m
First place	2026 Budapest	200 m
World Relays
Gold medal – first place	2024 Nassau	4 × 100 m relay

Melissa Jefferson-Wooden (née Jefferson; born February 21, 2001) is an American track and field sprinter who competes in the 100 meters and 200 m. She rose to prominence at the 2024 Summer Olympics, winning bronze in the 100 metres.

At the 2025 World Championships, she became the first American woman—and the second woman ever—to achieve the sprint triple, capturing gold in the 100 m, 200 m, and 4 × 100 m relay. Her winning 100 m time of 10.61 s set a new championship record and made her the fourth-fastest woman of all time. She continued her form into the 2026 season, winning the sprint double at the inaugural 2026 World Ultimate Championship. Her winning 200 m time of 21.47 s made her the third-fastest woman of all time over the distance.

Jefferson-Wooden finished the 2025 and 2026 seasons as the world's top-ranked female sprinter in both the 100 m and 200 m. She has won gold in the 4 × 100 m relay in Tokyo 2025 World Athletics Championships, in the 4 × 100 metres relay at the 2024 Olympic Games, as well as the 2022 and 2023 World Athletics Championships, and the 2024 World Athletics Relays.

== Career ==
=== 2022: U.S. Champion and 4 × 100 m World championships gold ===
Jefferson competed at Coastal Carolina University and won the NCAA Indoor 60 m Championship in 2022. She won the 100 metres at the 2022 USA Outdoor Track and Field Championships to qualify for the 2022 World Athletics Championships held in Eugene, Oregon. Jefferson reached the final and finished eighth. She won gold as part of the 4 × 100 metres relay team.

=== 2023: 4 × 100 m World Championships gold ===
In 2023, she placed fifth at the 2023 USA Outdoor Track and Field Championships and was selected for the relay team. The team won the 4 × 100 m relay at the 2023 World Athletics Championships held in Budapest.

=== 2024: 100 m Olympic bronze, 4 × 100 m gold ===
In 2024, Jefferson was a member of the USA team which won the 4 × 100 m relay at the 2024 World Athletics Relays in Nassau, Bahamas. She won the 100m at the LA Grand Prix meet in May. In June, she finished second in the 100 metres at the U.S. Olympic trials in Eugene, Oregon, in a new personal best of 10.80 seconds. At the Paris Olympics, she won a bronze medal in the 100 m with a time of 10.92 s. She won gold as part of the 4 × 100 m relay team.

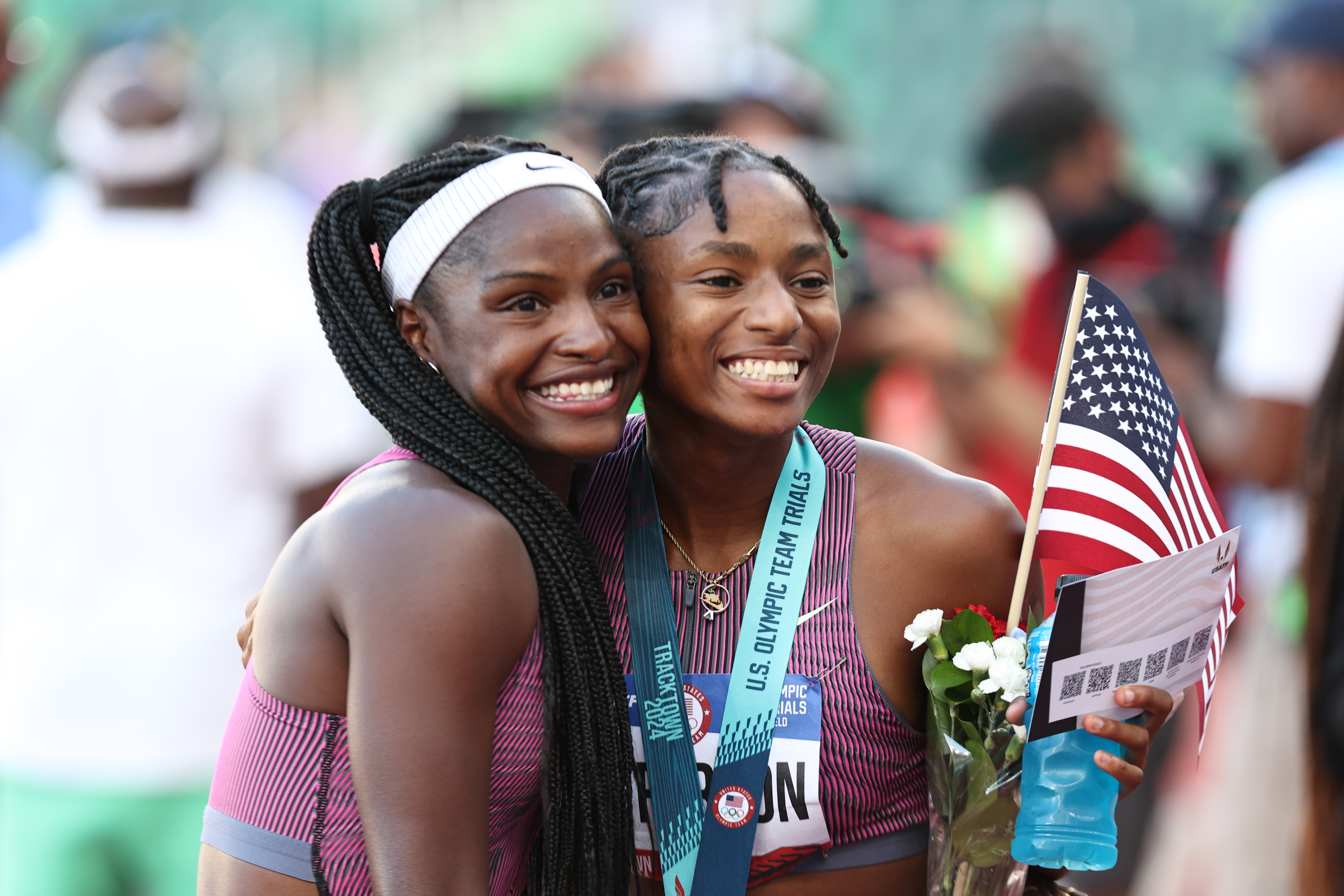
Jefferson (right) and her training partner, Twanisha Terry (left), at the 2024 US Olympic trials

=== 2025: Triple World Champion ===
In September 2024, it was announced that Jefferson had signed up for the inaugural season of the Michael Johnson founded Grand Slam Track taking place in 2025. She won both the 100 metres and 200 metres races in the Short Sprints category, ahead of Jenna Prandini and Jacious Sears, at the inaugural Grand Slam Track Kingston meeting on April 5–6, 2025, in Kingston, Jamaica. Jefferson ran 10.75 (+2.4 wind) to win the women's 100 metres race at the second slam event in Miami on May 2, 2025. The following day, she became the first athlete to claim back-to-back titles as third place in the 200 metres race, which meant she finished a point clear of 200 m winner Gabby Thomas in the two-race format. She ran a personal best of 21.99 seconds to win the 200 metres race at the 2025 Philadelphia Slam on May 31, 2025, beating the 2024 Olympic champion in the 200m, Gabby Thomas. The following day, she moved into the top-ten all-time for the 100 metres, running a personal best and current world lead of 10.73 seconds. On July 5, She ran 10.75 seconds to beat Olympic champion Julien Alfred into second in the 100 metres at the 2025 Prefontaine Classic into a headwind (−1.5 m/s).

She ran 10.65 seconds (+0.4) to win 100 metres at the 2025 USA Outdoor Track and Field Championships, in Eugene, with the time making her the joint-fifth-fastest woman in history. She also ran a personal best to win the 200 meters at the championships in 21.84 seconds. Later that month, she ran 10.66 seconds (+0.1) to win the 100 metres at the Diamond League event in Silesia, and 10.76 (−0.3) to win at the 2025 Memorial Van Damme in the Diamond League, in Brussels, Belgium.

At the 2025 World Athletics Championships, she won the 100 meters in a new championship record time of 10.61 (+0.3), and became the fourth fastest woman in history. She also won the women's 200 metres at the championships, running a world lead of 21.68 seconds. She also won the gold medal with the American team in the women's 4 x 100 metres relay at the championships, completing the sprint triple.

=== 2026: World Ultimate double champion and American 200 m champion ===
Jefferson-Wooden opened her season on June 4, when she was second to Julien Alfred in 22.17 seconds in the women's 200 metres at the 2026 Diamond League event in Rome. On June 7, in the Diamond League, Jefferson-Wooden won over 100 metres in 10.84 seconds (+0.8), at the Bauhausgalan in Stockholm, her fastest season opener over the distance. On July 4, she won the 100 metres at the Prefontaine Classic, winning in a photo finish ahead of Sha'Carri Richardson and Adaejah Hodge in 10.78 seconds (+0.0). Choosing to only compete in the 200 metres at the U.S. Outdoor Championships in a season without USA team trials, she won the title in 21.69 seconds ahead of Cambrea Sturgis and Camryn Dickson.

On August 23, she won over 100 metres equalling her season’s best time of 10.78 seconds (0.6m/s) to win ahead of Alfred and Richardson in the Diamond League at the 2026 Kamila Skolimowska Memorial in Silesia, Poland. On August 27, she ran 10.70 seconds but was edged out in a photo-finish by Alfred in the 100 metres at the Weltklasse Zürich, her first defeat over 100 metres since the 2024 Olympic final after a run of 11 consecutive victories at the distance. On September 12, Jefferson-Wooden won the 100 metres ahead of Alfred at the inaugural World Ultimate Championship in Budapest, running a season's best 10.62 seconds. The following day, she returned to complete the sprint double by winning the 200 metres final, with her time of 21.47 seconds making her the third-fastest woman on the all-time list. Following the race, Jefferson-Wooden expressed shock at her time, stating, "I was thinking 21.6 low, 21.5. I skipped all over 21.5 and went 21.4. I mean I'll take it!"

== Athletics achievements ==
Information from her World Athletics profile unless otherwise noted.

=== Personal bests ===
Type	Distance	Time (s)	Wind (m/s)	Venue	Date	Notes
Individual events
Indoor	60 metres	7.09	—N/a	Birmingham, United States	March 12, 2022	
Indoor	200 metres sh	23.34	—N/a	Columbia, United States	January 22, 2022	
Outdoor	100 metres	10.61	+0.3	Tokyo, Japan	September 14, 2025	
Outdoor	200 metres	21.47	−0.6	Budapest, Hungary	September 13, 2026	
Team events
Indoor	4 × 400 metres relay sh	3:45.48	—N/a	Columbia, United States	January 22, 2022	
Outdoor	4 × 100 metres relay	41.14	—N/a	Eugene, United States	July 23, 2022	
Outdoor	4 × 400 metres relay	3:36.25	—N/a	Jacksonville, United States	April 30, 2022	

=== Circuit performances ===
Grand Slam Track results
Slam	Race group	Event	Pl.	Time	Prize money
2025 Kingston Slam	Short sprints	100 m	1st	11.11	US$100,000
2025 Kingston Slam	Short sprints	200 m	1st	23.46	US$100,000
2025 Miami Slam	Short sprints	100 m	1st	10.75	US$100,000
2025 Miami Slam	Short sprints	200 m	3rd	22.15	US$100,000
2025 Philadelphia Slam	Short sprints	200 m	1st	21.99	US$100,000
2025 Philadelphia Slam	Short sprints	100 m	1st	10.73	US$100,000

=== International competitions ===
Representing the United States
Year	Competition	Venue	Position	Event	Time	Notes
2022	World Championships	Eugene, United States	8th	100 m	11.03	
2022	World Championships	Eugene, United States	1st	4 × 100 m relay	41.14	WL
2023	World Championships	Budapest, Hungary	1st	4 × 100 m relay	41.59	(Note: Time from the heats; she did not run in the final.)
2024	World Relays	Nassau, Bahamas	1st	4 × 100 m relay	41.85	CR WL
2024	Olympic Games	Paris, France	3rd	100 m	10.92	
2024	Olympic Games	Paris, France	1st	4 × 100 m relay	41.78	SB
2025	World Championships	Tokyo, Japan	1st	100 m	10.61	CR WL PB
2025	World Championships	Tokyo, Japan	1st	200 m	21.68	WL PB
2025	World Championships	Tokyo, Japan	1st	4 × 100 m relay	41.75	
2026	World Ultimate Championship	Budapest, Hungary	1st	100 m	10.62	WL
2026	World Ultimate Championship	Budapest, Hungary	1st	200 m	21.47	WL PB

=== National championships and competitions ===
Year	Competition	Venue	Position	Event	Time	Wind (m/s)	Notes
2021	NCAA Division I Championships	Eugene, Oregon	12th (sf)	100 m	11.43	+0.9	
2021	NCAA Division I Championships	Eugene, Oregon	18th (sf)	200 m	23.46	+0.9	
2022	NCAA Division I Indoor Championships	Birmingham, Alabama	1st	60 m	7.09	—N/a	
2022	NCAA Division I Championships	Eugene, Oregon	8th	100 m	11.24	+0.2	
2022	NCAA Division I Championships	Eugene, Oregon	9th	200 m	22.90	+1.3	
2022	NCAA Division I Championships	Eugene, Oregon	8th	4 × 100 m relay	43.78	—N/a	
2022	USA Championships	Eugene, Oregon	1st	100 m	10.69	+2.9	
2023	USA Championships	Eugene, Oregon	5th	100 m	11.03	+0.7	
2024	U.S. Olympic Team Trials	Eugene, Oregon	2nd	100 m	10.80	+0.8	
2025	USA Championships	Eugene, Oregon	1st	100 m	10.65	+0.4	
2025	USA Championships	Eugene, Oregon	1st	200 m	21.84	+0.5	
2026	USA Championships	New York City, New York	1st	200 m	21.69	+1.0	

== Personal life ==
She married Rolan Wooden II in March 2025 in Florida. The ceremony featured Isaiah Likely as best man and Twanisha “Tee Tee” Terry as a bridesmaid, with fellow Olympians Sha'Carri Richardson, Kenny Bednarek and Christian Coleman in attendance. The couple live in Florida.
