= 2025 Grand Slam Track =

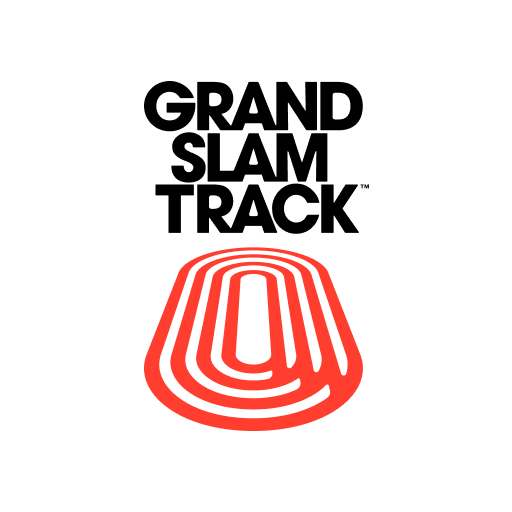
- Edition: 1st
- Dates: 4 April – 1 June 2025
- Events: 12
- Meetings: 3
- Individual Prize Money (US$): $9.45 million

The 2025 Grand Slam Track season was the inaugural season of Grand Slam Track, an outdoor professional track and field league established in 2024 by Michael Johnson. The season lasted from April to June.

== Schedule ==
The 2025 Grand Slam Track season was originally planned to consist of four meetings, or Slams. The Los Angeles Slam was cancelled on 12 June for various reasons, including the current "geopolitical climate of LA" and a "poor lease agreement with UCLA".

Slam	Date	Meet	Stadium	City	Country
1	4–6 April	2025 Kingston Slam	Independence Park	Kingston	Jamaica
2	2–4 May	2025 Miami Slam	Ansin Sports Complex	Miramar	United States
3	May 31–June 1	2025 Philadelphia Slam	Franklin Field	Philadelphia	United States
4	Cancelled (Note: Originally scheduled for 27–29 June)	2025 Los Angeles Slam	Drake Stadium	Los Angeles	United States

== Format ==
There are six race groups for males and females. Each race group features two disciplines that competitors compete in over the course of the weekend.

For each category, there are eight competitors in total. Four of these are the "Grand Slam Racers," who, at the beginning of the season, make the starting list of each of the four Grand Slam events, for a total of 48 consistent athletes present in each Slam (four racers in six categories, male and female). They were chosen based on their world rankings and merits and are among the best in the world. The other four competitors are the "Grand Slam Challengers," who are emerging athletes and are attempting to earn a spot as a Grand Slam Racer for the following season. The Challengers will vary between Grand Slam events based on recent performances and potential matchups.

From first to eighth place, points are awarded as follows for each individual event: 12, 8, 6, 5, 4, 3, 2, and 1. The athlete with the best combined score between the two events in their category is deemed the winner, or Slam champion, of that specific meet. Should there be a tie, the highest individual finishing placement between the two would win the Slam. If there is still a tie, then lowest combined time was utilized as a tiebreaker.

At the conclusion of the season, one male and one female athlete are crowned the "Racer of the Year" based on their cumulative points earned across all four Slams.

Event Category	First Event	Second Event
Short Sprints	100 m	200 m
Short Hurdles	100 m hurdles (W); 110 m hurdles (M)	100 m flat
Long Sprints	200 m	400 m
Long Hurdles	400 m hurdles	400 m flat
Short Distance	800 m	1500 m
Long Distance (Note: Changed to 3000 m only at the 2025 Philadelphia Slam)	3000 m	5000 m

=== Prize money ===
The Grand Slam Track league offers a chance for athletes, should they win each of the four (Note: Three for 2025 season) Slams in their event category, to win upwards of US$400,000.00 (Note: US$300,000.00 for 2025 season) in a single season. (Note: At the 2025 Philadelphia Slam, prize money was halved for the Long Distance event category, since only one event was contested.)

Place	Prize money per slam
1st	$100,000.00
2nd	$50,000.00
3rd	$30,000.00
4th	$25,000.00
5th	$20,000.00
6th	$15,000.00
7th	$12,500.00
8th	$10,000.00

== Slam winners ==
Key: (R) = Racer / (C) = Challenger

=== Men ===
Event Category	Kingston	Miami	Philadelphia	Racer of the Year
Short Sprints	Kenny Bednarek (USA) (R)			Kenny Bednarek (USA) (R)
Short Hurdles	Sasha Zhoya (FRA) (R)	Trey Cunningham (USA) (C)	Jamal Britt (USA) (C)	Kenny Bednarek (USA) (R)
Long Sprints	Matthew Hudson-Smith (GBR) (R)	Jereem Richards (TTO) (R)	Matthew Hudson-Smith (GBR) (R)	Kenny Bednarek (USA) (R)
Long Hurdles	Alison dos Santos (BRA) (R)		Trevor Bassitt (USA) (C)	Kenny Bednarek (USA) (R)
Short Distance	Emmanuel Wanyonyi (KEN) (C)	Josh Kerr (GBR) (R)	Marco Arop (CAN) (R)	Kenny Bednarek (USA) (R)
Long Distance	Grant Fisher (USA) (R)		Nico Young (USA) (C)	Kenny Bednarek (USA) (R)

=== Women ===
Event Category	Kingston	Miami	Philadelphia	Racer of the Year
Short Sprints	Melissa Jefferson-Wooden (USA) (R)			Melissa Jefferson-Wooden (USA) (R)
Short Hurdles	Danielle Williams (JAM) (C)	Ackera Nugent (JAM) (R)		Melissa Jefferson-Wooden (USA) (R)
Long Sprints	Gabrielle Thomas (USA) (R)	Marileidy Paulino (DOM) (R)		Melissa Jefferson-Wooden (USA) (R)
Long Hurdles	Sydney McLaughlin-Levrone (USA) (R)		Jasmine Jones (USA) (R)	Melissa Jefferson-Wooden (USA) (R)
Short Distance	Diribe Welteji (ETH) (R)	Freweyni Hailu (ETH) (C)	Diribe Welteji (ETH) (R)	Melissa Jefferson-Wooden (USA) (R)
Long Distance	Ejgayehu Taye (ETH) (C)	Agnes Jebet Ngetich (KEN) (R)		Melissa Jefferson-Wooden (USA) (R)

== Racers ==
Men
Event category	Athlete	Signing date	Best individual WC / Oly. finish
Short Sprints	Kenny Bednarek (USA)	12 Sep 2024	2nd (2020, 2022, 2024)
Short Sprints	Fred Kerley (USA)	12 Sep 2024	1st (2022)
Short Sprints	Oblique Seville (JAM)	10 Dec 2024	4th (2022, 2023)
Short Sprints	Zharnel Hughes (GBR)	19 Dec 2024	3rd (2023)
Short Hurdles	Devon Allen (USA)	22 Oct 2024	4th (2021)
Short Hurdles	Daniel Roberts (USA)	22 Oct 2024	2nd (2024)
Short Hurdles	Sasha Zhoya (FRA)	10 Dec 2024	6th (2023)
Short Hurdles	Freddie Crittenden (USA)	19 Dec 2024	4th (2023)
Long Sprints	Muzala Samukonga (ZAM)	26 Sep 2024	3rd (2024)
Long Sprints	Quincy Hall (USA) (Note: Hall was replaced by Steven Gardiner on 24 April 2025.)	10 Oct 2024	1st (2024)
Long Sprints	Steven Gardiner (BAH)	24 April 2025	1st (2019, 2021)
Long Sprints	Matthew Hudson-Smith (GBR)	10 Oct 2024	2nd (2023, 2024)
Long Sprints	Jereem Richards (TRI)	22 Oct 2024	4th (2024)
Long Hurdles	Alison Dos Santos (BRA)	26 Sep 2024	1st (2022)
Long Hurdles	Clément Ducos (FRA)	26 Sep 2024	4th (2024)
Long Hurdles	Roshawn Clarke (JAM)	17 Oct 2024	4th (2023)
Long Hurdles	Caleb Dean (USA)	19 Dec 2024	N/A
Short Distance	Josh Kerr (GBR)	27 Jun 2024	1st (2023)
Short Distance	Yared Nuguse (USA)	4 Sep 2024	3rd (2024)
Short Distance	Cole Hocker (USA)	4 Sep 2024	1st (2024)
Short Distance	Marco Arop (CAN)	22 Oct 2024	1st (2023)
Long Distance	Grant Fisher (USA)	15 Oct 2024	3rd (2024)
Long Distance	Ronald Kwemoi (KEN)	15 Oct 2024	2nd (2024)
Long Distance	Luis Grijalva (GUA)	22 Oct 2024	4th (2022, 2023)
Long Distance	Hagos Gebrhiwet (ETH)	10 Dec 2024	2nd (2013)
Women
Event category	Athlete	Signing date	Best individual WC / Oly. finish
Short Sprints	Melissa Jefferson (USA)	19 Sep 2024	3rd (2024)
Short Sprints	Daryll Neita (GBR)	21 Nov 2024	4th (2024)
Short Sprints	Gabby Thomas (USA)	27 Nov 2024	1st (2024)
Short Sprints	Brittany Brown (USA)	19 Dec 2024	2nd (2019)
Short Hurdles	Masai Russell (USA)	25 Sep 2024	1st (2024)
Short Hurdles	Cyrena Samba-Mayela (FRA)	25 Sep 2024	2nd (2024)
Short Hurdles	Jasmine Camacho-Quinn (PUR)	25 Sep 2024	1st (2020)
Short Hurdles	Ackera Nugent (JAM)	17 Oct 2024	5th (2023)
Long Sprints	Marileidy Paulino (DOM)	22 Oct 2024	1st (2023, 2024)
Long Sprints	Salwa Eid Naser (BHR)	21 Nov 2024	1st (2019)
Long Sprints	Alexis Holmes (USA)	10 Dec 2024	6th (2024)
Long Sprints	Nickisha Pryce (JAM)	10 Dec 2024	14th sf (2024)
Long Hurdles	Sydney McLaughlin-Levrone (USA)	18 Jun 2024	1st (2020, 2021, 2022, 2024)
Long Hurdles	Jasmine Jones (USA)	22 Oct 2024	4th (2024)
Long Hurdles	Rushell Clayton (JAM)	22 Oct 2024	3rd (2019, 2023)
Long Hurdles	Shamier Little (USA)	22 Oct 2024	2nd (2015, 2023)
Short Distance	Nikki Hiltz (USA)	15 Oct 2024	7th (2024)
Short Distance	Jess Hull (AUS)	22 Oct 2024	2nd (2024)
Short Distance	Mary Moraa (KEN)	21 Nov 2024	1st (2023)
Short Distance	Diribe Welteji (ETH)	19 Dec 2024	2nd (2023)
Long Distance	Agnes Ngetich (KEN)	1 Nov 2024	6th (2023)
Long Distance	Tsigie Gebreselama (ETH)	1 Nov 2024	10th (2024)
Long Distance	Elise Cranny (USA)	21 Nov 2024	9th (2022, 2023)
Long Distance	Nozomi Tanaka (JPN)	21 Nov 2024	8th (2021, 2023)
