= Grand Slam Track =

Professional track and field league

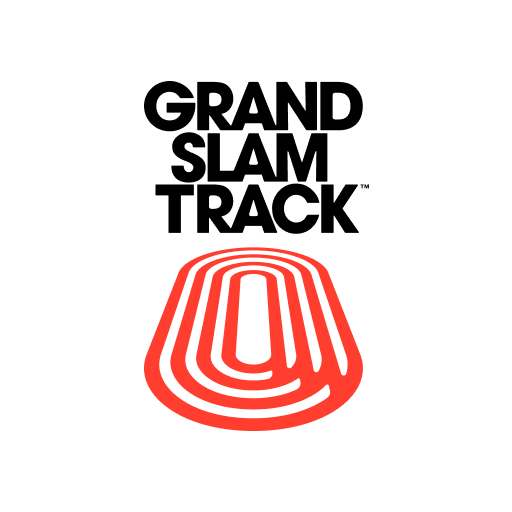
- Sport: Athletics
- Founded: February 2024
- First season: 2025
- Folded: December 2025
- Website: Grand Slam Track

Grand Slam Track is a professional track and field league, first announced in 2024 by American former Olympic champion sprinter Michael Johnson. The first season ran from April to June 2025. After being initially announced in February 2024, the name of the league and other details were announced at a June 2024 press conference in Los Angeles hosted by John Anderson.

Following a series of financial challenges, the league filed for Chapter 11 bankruptcy in December 2025 and entered a period of reorganization.

== Development ==
Former sprinter Michael Johnson, who had had the idea for Grand Slam Track since the 1990s, announced in February 2024 his intention to launch a track and field league in 2025. It was announced that the league would include a series of events during the track season between April and September, though events ended up only running through June. Johnson, along with billionaire hedge fund manager Bill Ackman, were reported to be investing millions of their own money in the league.

The announcement of the League in February 2024 came with the stated aims to increase and boost the sport of track and field in public consciousness and to promote the sport outside the four-yearly cycle of Olympic Games. One of the aims is for the Track and Field League to resemble other sports leagues, with global athletes. As opposed to once every four years like the Olympic Games, the Grand Slam Track league will occur four times every year.

In May 2024, former middle-distance runner Kyle Merber confirmed he was employed as Senior Director of Racing. Olympic champion and former sprinter Morolake Akinosun was announced as the Head of Athlete Relations in September 2024.

Among the first athletes to sign-up for the events in June 2024 were double Olympic champion 400 m hurdler Sydney McLaughlin-Levrone and 2023 world champion and 2024 Olympic silver medalist in the 1500 m Josh Kerr. In September 2024, it was confirmed that Cole Hocker and Yared Nuguse, the 2024 Olympic gold and bronze medalists respectively in the 1500 metres, had signed onto the league. During this month sprinters Kenny Bednarek and Fred Kerley also signed onto the league.

On 13 September 2024, LetsRun.com reported that the Grand Slam Track meet locations would be in Los Angeles, New York City, Kingston (Jamaica), and Birmingham (England), with the events being held during two weeks in April and two weeks in May, noting that they had not yet confirmed the information with a second source. In November 2024, Grand Slam Track officially announced the four locations as Kingston, Los Angeles, Miramar, and Philadelphia.

By 19 December 2024, the entire set of racers for the 2025 season was announced. The roster included 13 individual global gold medalists, although notable omissions included Noah Lyles and Sha'Carri Richardson.

On 12 June 2025, it was announced that the Los Angeles Slam was cancelled, with the league's offered explanations placing blame on the "geopolitical climate of LA" at the time, and a "poor lease agreement with UCLA". On 18 June 2025, Grand Slam Track announced a partnership with Sundial Media and Technology Group.

== Financial challenges ==
Following the conclusion of the 2025 season, as of July 2025, the league has yet to pay the City of Miramar for the rental of the Ansin Sports Complex for the duration of the Miami Slam. It has also been reported that the league still owes $13 million in prize money and appearance fees to athletes, though Kingston Slam appearance fees have been paid out. Prize money payouts are scheduled from the end of July through to the end of September, and will include the honoring of Los Angeles appearance fees. Some athletes, including Gabby Thomas, Emmanuel Wanyonyi, Alison dos Santos, and Grant Fisher have commented about not having yet received payment. Sebastian Coe commented that World Athletics was monitoring outstanding athlete payments from Grand Slam Track. In an interview on July 24, Michael Johnson stated the league was facing a difficult financial situation, in part caused by excessive spending. Furthermore, a key investor withdrew an eight-figure commitment shortly after the Kingston Slam.

On July 31, it was reported that the prize money payments scheduled for the end of July, roughly $3 million, were not paid. In August, Michael Johnson apologized for missing the payment deadline and stated the 2026 season will not occur unless a solution is found.

In late November 2025, it was reported that Grand Slam Track offered its creditors, including vendors, a settlement of 50% of the amounts owed to avoid bankruptcy. Legal representatives warned that if the proposal was rejected collectively, the organization would seek bankruptcy protection. The report also noted that athletes had previously received half of their outstanding payments, but under U.S. bankruptcy law, those payments could be subject to clawback if the league files for bankruptcy. Grand Slam Track filed for Chapter 11 bankruptcy in December 2025; organizers said that they were entering a "court-supervised reorganization". Grand Slam Track has expressed its intention to return for a 2026 season once its financial obligations are resolved.

== Overview ==
The league has four "slams," also known as meets, which take place in a season from April through June. In each slam, there are six event categories for males and females, listed below. Each event category features two disciplines that athletes will compete in over the course of a weekend.

For each category, there are eight competitors in total. Four of these are the "Grand Slam Racers," who, at the beginning of the season, make the starting list of each of the four Grand Slam events, for a total of 48 consistent athletes present in each slam (four racers in six categories, male and female). They are chosen based on their world rankings and merits and are among the best in the world. The other four competitors are the "Grand Slam Challengers," who are emerging athletes and are attempting to earn a spot as a Grand Slam Racer for the following season. The Challengers will vary between Grand Slam events based on recent performances and potential matchups.

From first to eighth place, points are distributed as follows for each individual event: 12, 8, 6, 5, 4, 3, 2, and 1. (Note: Points were originally announced in 2024 as 10, 8, 6, 5, 4, 3, 2, and 1, but by 2025 before the first Slam, the points system was changed to award 12 points to the winner instead of 10.) The athlete with the best combined score between the two events in their category is deemed the winner, or Slam champion, of that specific meet. Should there be a tie, the highest individual finishing placement between the two will win the Slam. If the tie persists, then the lowest combined time is utilized as a tiebreaker.

At the conclusion of the season, one male and one female athlete are crowned the "Racer of the Year" based on their cumulative points earned across all four Slams.

=== Event categories ===
Event category	First event	Second event
Short Sprints	100 m	200 m
Short Hurdles	100 m hurdles (W); 110 m hurdles (M)	100 m flat
Long Sprints	200 m	400 m
Long Hurdles	400 m hurdles	400 m flat
Short Distance	800 m	1500 m
Long Distance (Note: Changed to 3000 m only at the 2025 Philadelphia Slam)	3000 m	5000 m

=== Prize money ===
The Grand Slam Track league offers a chance for athletes, should they win each of the four (Note: Three for 2025 season) Slams in their event category, to win upwards of US$400,000 (Note: US$300,000.00 for 2025 season) in a single season. (Note: At the 2025 Philadelphia Slam, prize money was halved for the Long Distance event category, since only one event was contested.)

Place	Prize money per slam
1st	$100,000
2nd	$50,000
3rd	$30,000
4th	$25,000
5th	$20,000
6th	$15,000
7th	$12,500
8th	$10,000

=== Broadcast ===
In February 2025, Grand Slam Track announced agreements with The CW, an over-the-air network, and the streaming service Peacock in the United States. All events stream on Peacock, while The CW airs weekend coverage. NBC, whose parent company owns Peacock, also airs a highlight special.

== Editions ==
The league officially launched in June 2024, prior to its 2025 debut season.

Season	Info	Kingston Slam	Miami Slam	Philadelphia Slam	Los Angeles Slam
2025	Venue, City, Country	Independence Park, Kingston, Jamaica	Ansin Sports Complex, Miami, US	Franklin Field, Philadelphia, US	Drake Stadium, Los Angeles, US
2025	Date	April 4–6	May 2–4	May 31 – June 1	Cancelled (Note: Originally scheduled for June 27–29)

== Slam winners ==
Key: (R) = Racer / (C) = Challenger

=== 2025 season ===
==== Men ====
Event Category	Kingston	Miami	Philadelphia	Racer of the Year
Short Sprints	Kenny Bednarek (USA) (R)			Kenny Bednarek (USA) (R)
Short Hurdles	Sasha Zhoya (FRA) (R)	Trey Cunningham (USA) (C)	Jamal Britt (USA) (C)	Kenny Bednarek (USA) (R)
Long Sprints	Matthew Hudson-Smith (GBR) (R)	Jereem Richards (TTO) (R)	Matthew Hudson-Smith (GBR) (R)	Kenny Bednarek (USA) (R)
Long Hurdles	Alison dos Santos (BRA) (R)		Trevor Bassitt (USA) (C)	Kenny Bednarek (USA) (R)
Short Distance	Emmanuel Wanyonyi (KEN) (C)	Josh Kerr (GBR) (R)	Marco Arop (CAN) (R)	Kenny Bednarek (USA) (R)
Long Distance	Grant Fisher (USA) (R)		Nico Young (USA) (C)	Kenny Bednarek (USA) (R)

==== Women ====
Event Category	Kingston	Miami	Philadelphia	Racer of the Year
Short Sprints	Melissa Jefferson-Wooden (USA) (R)			Melissa Jefferson-Wooden (USA) (R)
Short Hurdles	Danielle Williams (JAM) (C)	Ackera Nugent (JAM) (R)		Melissa Jefferson-Wooden (USA) (R)
Long Sprints	Gabrielle Thomas (USA) (R)	Marileidy Paulino (DOM) (R)		Melissa Jefferson-Wooden (USA) (R)
Long Hurdles	Sydney McLaughlin-Levrone (USA) (R)		Jasmine Jones (USA) (R)	Melissa Jefferson-Wooden (USA) (R)
Short Distance	Diribe Welteji (ETH) (R)	Freweyni Hailu (ETH) (C)	Diribe Welteji (ETH) (R)	Melissa Jefferson-Wooden (USA) (R)
Long Distance	Ejgayehu Taye (ETH) (C)	Agnes Jebet Ngetich (KEN) (R)	Agnes Jebet Ngetich (KEN) (R)	Melissa Jefferson-Wooden (USA) (R)

== League records ==
Key: (R) = Racer / (C) = Challenger

=== Men ===
Event	Record	Athlete	Nation	Date	Slam	Ref
100 m	9.86 (+0.8 m/s)	Kenny Bednarek (R)	United States	1 June 2025	2025 Philadelphia	
200 m	19.84 (+0.2 m/s)	Kenny Bednarek (R)	United States	4 May 2025	2025 Miami	
400 m	43.98	Jacory Patterson (C)	United States	3 May 2025	2025 Miami	
800 m	1:43.38	Marco Arop (R)	Canada	31 May 2025	2025 Philadelphia	
1500 m	3:34.44	Josh Kerr (R)	Great Britain	1 June 2025	2025 Philadelphia	
3000 m	7:51.55	Hagos Gebrhiwet (R)	Ethiopia	6 April 2025	2025 Kingston	
5000 m	13:40.32	Grant Fisher (R)	United States	4 May 2025	2025 Miami	
110 m hurdles	13.00 (+1.4 m/s)	Trey Cunningham (C)	United States	3 May 2025	2025 Miami	
400 m hurdles	47.61	Alison dos Santos (R)	Brazil	4 April 2025	2025 Kingston	

=== Women ===
Event	Record	Athlete	Nation	Date	Slam	Ref
100 m	10.73 (+1.3 m/s)	Melissa Jefferson-Wooden (R)	United States	1 June 2025	2025 Philadelphia	
200 m	21.95 (+1.1 m/s)	Gabrielle Thomas (R)	United States	3 May 2025	2025 Miami	
400 m	48.67	Salwa Eid Naser (R)	Bahrain	5 April 2025	2025 Kingston	
800 m	1:58.23	Nikki Hiltz (R)	United States	4 April 2025	2025 Kingston	
1500 m	3:58.04	Diribe Welteji (R)	Ethiopia	31 May 2025	2025 Philadelphia	
3000 m	8:22.72	Hirut Meshesha (C)	Ethiopia	4 May 2025	2025 Miami	
5000 m	14:25.80	Agnes Jebet Ngetich (R)	Kenya	2 May 2025	2025 Miami	
100 m hurdles	12.17 (+2.0 m/s)	Masai Russell (R)	United States	2 May 2025	2025 Miami	
400 m hurdles	52.07	Sydney McLaughlin-Levrone (R)	United States	3 May 2025	2025 Miami	
