= 2023 Asian Athletics Championships – Women's 100 metres hurdles =

Women's 100 metres hurdles at the 2023 Asian Athletics Championships
- Venue: National Stadium
- Location: Bangkok, Thailand
- Dates: 13 July
- Competitors: 16 from 10 nations
- Winning time: 13.09

Medalists
gold medal	Jyothi Yarraji	India
silver medal	Asuka Terada	Japan
bronze medal	Masumi Aoki	Japan

The women's 100 metres hurdles event at the 2023 Asian Athletics Championships was held on 13 July.

== Records ==
Records before the 2023 Asian Athletics Championships
Record	Athlete (nation)	Time (s)	Location	Date
World record	Tobi Amusan (NGR)	12.12	Eugene, United States	24 July 2022
Asian record	Olga Shishigina (KAZ)	12.44	Lucerne, Switzerland	27 June 1995
Championship record	Feng Yun (CHN)	12.97	Fukuoka, Japan	20 July 1998
World leading	Jasmine Camacho-Quinn (PUR)	12.31	Los Angeles, United States	27 May 2023
Asian leading	Jyothi Yarraji (IND)	12.84	Weinheim, Germany	27 May 2023

== Results ==
=== Heats ===
Qualification rule: First 3 in each heat (Q) and the next 2 fastest (q) qualified for the final.

Wind:
Heat 1: +0.8 m/s, Heat 2: 0.0 m/s

Rank	Heat	Name	Nationality	Time	Notes
1	1	Jyothi Yarraji	India	12.98	Q
2	1	Masumi Aoki	Japan	13.12	Q
3	2	Asuka Terada	Japan	13.14	Q
4	2	Wu Yanni	China	13.18	Q
5	1	Lui Lai Yiu	Hong Kong	13.33	Q
6	1	Huỳnh Thị Mỹ Tiên	Vietnam	13.46	q, PB
7	2	Nithya Ramraj	India	13.53	Q
8	2	Chang Po-ya	Chinese Taipei	13.61	q
9	2	Nguyễn Bùi Thị	Vietnam	13.65	
10	1	Dina Aulia	Indonesia	13.68	
11	1	Lin Shih-ting	Chinese Taipei	13.80	
12	2	Jo Eun-ju	South Korea	13.84	
13	1	Lydiya Podsepkina	Uzbekistan	13.93	
14	2	Yuliya Bashmanova	Kazakhstan	14.17	
	2	Shing Cho Yan	Hong Kong	DNF	
	1	Lin Yuwei	China	DNS	

=== Final ===
Wind: -0.1 m/s

Rank	Lane	Name	Nationality	Time	Notes
1st place, gold medalist(s)	5	Jyothi Yarraji	India	13.09	
2nd place, silver medalist(s)	3	Asuka Terada	Japan	13.13	
3rd place, bronze medalist(s)	6	Masumi Aoki	Japan	13.26	
4	7	Nithya Ramraj	India	13.55	
5	2	Huỳnh Thị Mỹ Tiên	Vietnam	13.65	
6	8	Lui Lai Yiu	Hong Kong	13.65	
7	1	Chang Po-ya	Chinese Taipei	13.68	
	4	Wu Yanni	China	DQ	FS
