= 2025 Asian Athletics Championships – Women's 100 metres hurdles =

Women's 100 metres hurdles at the 2025 Asian Athletics Championships
- Venue: Gumi Civic Stadium
- Location: Gumi, South Korea
- Dates: 28 May (heats); 29 May (final)
- Competitors: 15 from 10 nations
- Winning time: 12.96

Medalists
gold medal	Jyoti Yarraji	India
silver medal	Yumi Tanaka	Japan
bronze medal	Wu Yanni	China

The women's 100 metres hurdles event at the 2025 Asian Athletics Championships was held on 28 and 29 May.

== Records ==
Records before the 2025 Asian Athletics Championships
Record	Athlete (nation)	Time (s)	Location	Date
World record	Tobi Amusan (NGR)	12.12	Eugene, United States	24 July 2022
Asian record	Olga Shishigina (KAZ)	12.44	Lucerne, Switzerland	27 June 1995
Championship record	Feng Yun (CHN)	12.97	Fukuoka, Japan	20 July 1998
World leading	Masai Russell (USA)	12.17	Miramar, United States	2 May 2025
Asian leading	Yumi Tanaka (JPN)	12.81	Tokyo, Japan	18 May 2025

== Schedule ==
The event schedule, in local time (UTC+9), was as follows:

Date	Time	Round
28 May	11:00	Heats
29 May	22:20	Final

== Results ==
=== Heats ===
Held on 28 May. First 3 in each heat (Q) and the next 2 fastest (q) qualified for the final.

==== Heat 1 ====
Place	Lane	Athlete	Nation	Time	Notes
1	3	Yumi Tanaka	Japan	12.89	Q, CR
2	2	Wu Yanni	China	13.07	Q
3	6	Jyothi Yarraji	India	13.18	Q
4	4	Lui Lai Yiu	Hong Kong	13.42	q
5	5	Lidiya Podsepkina	Uzbekistan	13.68	
6	7	Jeong Yeon-jin	South Korea	13.70	PB
7	8	Antonina Chernyshova	Kazakhstan	14.17	PB
				Wind: (+1.8 m/s)	

==== Heat 2 ====
Place	Lane	Athlete	Nation	Time	Notes
1	8	Dina Aulia	Indonesia	13.11	Q, PB
2	2	Zhang Bo-ya	Chinese Taipei	13.17	Q
3	4	Liu Jingyang	China	13.25	Q, SB
4	3	Huỳnh Thị Mỹ Tiên	Vietnam	13.51	q
5	1	Ryu Na-nae	South Korea	13.61	SB
6	5	Yuliya Bashmanova	Kazakhstan	13.67 [.665]	SB
7	6	Shing Cho Yan	Hong Kong	13.67 [.668]	
8	7	Park Ji-young	South Korea	14.12	PB
				Wind: (±0.0 m/s)	

=== Final ===
Place	Lane	Athlete	Nation	Time	Notes
1st place, gold medalist(s)	7	Jyoti Yarraji	India	12.96	
2nd place, silver medalist(s)	4	Yumi Tanaka	Japan	13.07 [.061]	
3rd place, bronze medalist(s)	6	Wu Yanni	China	13.07 [.068]	
4	3	Dina Aulia	Indonesia	13.32 [.316]	
5	2	Liu Jingyang	China	13.32 [.317]	
6	5	Zhang Bo-ya	Chinese Taipei	13.42	
7	1	Huỳnh Thị Mỹ Tiên	Vietnam	13.69	
8	8	Lui Lai Yiu	Hong Kong	13.73	
				Wind: (−0.1 m/s)	
