= Athletics at the 2021 Summer World University Games – Women's 100 metres hurdles =

The women's 100 metres hurdles event at the 2021 Summer World University Games was held on 3 and 4 August 2023 at the Shuangliu Sports Centre Stadium in Chengdu, China.

== Medalists ==
Gold	Silver	Bronze
Viktória Forster; Slovakia	Wu Yanni; China	Jyothi Yarraji; India

== Results ==
=== Round 1 ===
Qualification: First 3 in each heat (Q) and the next 4 fastest (q) advance to semifinal.

Rank	Heat	Name	Nationality	Time	Notes
1	4	Wu Yanni	China	12.98	Q
2	4	Veronica Besana	Italy	13.05	Q
3	2	Viktória Forster	Slovakia	13.11	Q
4	1	Jyothi Yarraji	India	13.12	Q
5	3	Anna Tóth	Hungary	13.16	Q
6	3	Lin Yuwei	China	13.18	Q
7	1	Klaudia Wojtunik	Poland	13.31	Q
8	1	Tereza Šínová	Czech Republic	13.36	Q
9	3	Imogen Breslin	Australia	13.37	Q
10	2	Emily Britton	Australia	13.38	Q
11	4	Saara Keskitalo	Finland	13.41	Q
12	2	Weronika Nagięć	Poland	13.42	Q
13	3	Elsabe van der Merwe	South Africa	13.42	q
14	1	Şevval Ayaz	Turkey	13.51	q
15	4	Victoria Rausch	Luxembourg	13.52	q
16	1	Hsu Le	Chinese Taipei	13.53	q
17	2	Anni Siirtola	Finland	13.58	
18	3	Selina von Jackowski	Switzerland	13.74	
19	2	Pragyan Sahu	India	13.75	
20	2	Dina Aulia	Indonesia	13.87	
21	1	Vitória Alves	Brazil	13.89	
22	4	Adeyah Brewster	Barbados	14.09	
23	3	Lin Shih-ting	Chinese Taipei	14.14	
24	2	Ayaka Ito	Japan	14.18	
25	3	Candela Belaustegui	Argentina	15.09	
26	4	Tamanna Akter	Bangladesh	15.54	
27	2	Tinuade Adekola	Nigeria	19.17	
–	1	Eva Murn	Slovenia	DNF	
–	4	Meret Baumgartner	Switzerland	DQ	TR22.6.2

=== Semifinal ===
Qualification: First 3 in each heat (Q) and the next 2 fastest (q) advance to final.

Rank	Heat	Name	Nationality	Time	Notes
1	2	Wu Yanni	China	12.86	Q, PB
2	2	Veronica Besana	Italy	12.98	Q
3	2	Anna Tóth	Hungary	12.98	Q
4	1	Jyothi Yarraji	India	13.05	Q
5	1	Viktória Forster	Slovakia	13.05	Q
6	1	Lin Yuwei	China	13.08	Q
7	1	Saara Keskitalo	Finland	13.17	q, PB
8	2	Tereza Šínová	Czech Republic	13.18	q
9	1	Klaudia Wojtunik	Poland	13.19	
10	2	Weronika Nagięć	Poland	13.21	
11	2	Emily Britton	Australia	13.22	
12	2	Elsabe van der Merwe	South Africa	13.32	
13	1	Imogen Breslin	Australia	13.41	
14	1	Şevval Ayaz	Turkey	13.49	
15	1	Victoria Rausch	Luxembourg	13.57	
16	2	Hsu Le	Chinese Taipei	13.75	

=== Final ===
Rank	Name	Nationality	Time	Notes
1st place, gold medalist(s)	Viktória Forster	Slovakia	12.72	PB
2nd place, silver medalist(s)	Wu Yanni	China	12.76	PB
3rd place, bronze medalist(s)	Jyothi Yarraji	India	12.78	NR
4	Veronica Besana	Italy	12.98	
5	Lin Yuwei	China	13.03	
6	Saara Keskitalo	Finland	13.32	
7	Tereza Šínová	Czech Republic	16.94	
–	Anna Tóth	Hungary	DNF	
