= Athletics at the 2026 Asian Games – Women's 100 metres hurdles =

Women's 100 metres hurdles at the 2026 Asian Games
- Venue: Mizuho Park Athletic Stadium, Nagoya
- Dates: 26 September 2026 (round 1); 27 September 2026 (final)
- Competitors: 12 from 8 nations
- Winning time: 12.74 s

Medalists
gold medal	Mako Fukube	Japan
silver medal	Hitomi Nakajima	Japan
bronze medal	Wu Yanni	China

The women's 100 metres hurdles was held over two rounds at the 2026 Asian Games at the Mizuho Park Athletic Stadium in Nagoya, Japan on 26 and 27 September 2026.

== Schedule ==
All times are Japan Standard Time (UTC+09:00)

Schedule
Date	Time	Event
26 September 2026	19:42	Round 1
27 September 2026	20:23	Final

== Records ==
Prior to this competition, the existing world, Asian and Games records were as follows.

Record	Time	Athlete (nation)	Location	Date
World record	12.12	Tobi Amusan (NGR)	Eugene, United States	24 July 2022
Asian record	12.44	Olga Shishigina (KAZ)	Lucerne, Switzerland	27 June 1995
Games record	12.63	Olga Shishigina (KAZ)	Bangkok, Thailand	19 December 1998

== Results ==
=== Round 1 ===
First 3 in each heat (Q) and next 2 fastest (q) advanced to the final.

==== Heat 1 ====
Place	Athlete	Nation	Time	Notes
1	Hitomi Nakajima	Japan	12.85	Q
2	Zhang Bo-ya	Chinese Taipei	13.08	Q
3	Lin Yuwei	China	13.52	Q
4	Shing Cho Yan	Hong Kong	13.86	q
5	Khamailayphom Bounyaveun	Laos	14.61	PB
6	Nomin-od Ser-Od	Mongolia	14.98	
			Wind: (±0.0 m/s)	

==== Heat 2 ====
Place	Athlete	Nation	Time	Notes
1	Mako Fukube	Japan	12.85	Q
2	Wu Yanni	China	13.18	Q
3	Dina Aulia	Indonesia	13.39	Q, SB
4	Nandhini Kongan	India	13.48	q
5	Yi Bo-An	Chinese Taipei	14.05	
6	Lau Tsz Yan	Hong Kong	14.14	
			Wind: (−0.4 m/s)	

=== Final ===
Place	Athlete	Nation	Time	Notes
1st place, gold medalist(s)	Mako Fukube	Japan	12.74	
2nd place, silver medalist(s)	Hitomi Nakajima	Japan	12.78	
3rd place, bronze medalist(s)	Wu Yanni	China	13.12	
4	Zhang Bo-ya	Chinese Taipei	13.17	
5	Dina Aulia	Indonesia	13.25	SB
6	Nandhini Kongan	India	13.45	
7	Lin Yuwei	China	13.47	
8	Shing Cho Yan	Hong Kong	13.95	
			Wind: (−0.2 m/s)	
