= 2016 IAAF World U20 Championships – Women's 100 metres hurdles =

The women's 100 metres hurdles event at the 2016 IAAF World U20 Championships was held at Zdzisław Krzyszkowiak Stadium on 22, 23 and 24 July.

== Medalists ==
Gold	Elvira Herman; Belarus
Silver	Rushelle Burton; Jamaica
Bronze	Tia Jones; United States

== Records ==
Standing records prior to the 2016 IAAF World U20 Championships in Athletics
World Junior Record	Oluwatobiloba Amusan (NGR)	12.83	El Paso, TX, United States	30 April 2016
Championship Record	Kendell Williams (USA)	12.89	Eugene, OR, United States	27 July 2014
World Junior Leading	Oluwatobiloba Amusan (NGR)	12.83	El Paso, TX, United States	30 April 2016
Broken records during the 2016 IAAF World U20 Championships in Athletics
Championship Record	Elvira Herman (BLR)	12.85	Bydgoszcz, Poland	24 July 2016

== Results ==
=== Final ===
24 July
Start time: 16:04 Temperature: 25 °C Humidity: 61 %
Wind: +2.0 m/s

Rank	Name	Nationality	Lane	Reaction Time	Time	Notes
1st place, gold medalist(s)	Elvira Herman	Belarus	4	0.160	12.85	CR, AJR
2nd place, silver medalist(s)	Rushelle Burton	Jamaica	8	0.161	12.87	NJR
3rd place, bronze medalist(s)	Tia Jones	United States	7	0.180	12.89	
4	Alexis Duncan	United States	6	0.159	12.93	PB
5	Oluwatobiloba Amusan	Nigeria	5	0.197	12.95	
6	Alicia Barrett	Great Britain	2	0.175	13.15	PB
7	Taylon Bieldt	South Africa	3	0.150	13.37	
8	Laura Valette	France	9	0.183	13.42	

=== Semifinals ===
23 July
First 2 in each heat (Q) and the next 2 fastest (q) advance to the Final

==== Summary ====
Rank	Name	Nationality	Time	Notes
1	Elvira Herman	Belarus	12.97 (w: +0.9 m/s)	Q NJR
2	Oluwatobiloba Amusan	Nigeria	12.99 (w: +0.6 m/s)	Q
3	Alexis Duncan	United States	13.02 (w: +0.6 m/s)	Q PB
4	Tia Jones	United States	13.09 (w: -0.1 m/s)	Q
5	Rushelle Burton	Jamaica	13.21 (w: -0.1 m/s)	Q PB
6	Laura Valette	France	13.23 (w: +0.9 m/s)	Q
7	Alicia Barrett	Great Britain	13.34 (w: +0.6 m/s)	q PB
8	Taylon Bieldt	South Africa	13.35 (w: +0.9 m/s)	q NJR
9	Mollie Courtney	Great Britain	13.42 (w: -0.1 m/s)	
10	Yumi Tanaka	Japan	13.46 (w: +0.6 m/s)	PB
11	Jeanine Williams	Jamaica	13.59 (w: +0.6 m/s)	PB
12	Danielle Shaw	Australia	13.60 (w: +0.9 m/s)	PB
13	Ruslana Rashkavan	Belarus	13.61 (w: -0.1 m/s)	
14	Chloë Beaucarne	Belgium	13.65 (w: +0.9/s)	
15	Yuri Okubo	Japan	13.67 (w: -0.1 m/s)	
16	Lina Amr Gaber	Egypt	13.68 (w: +0.6 m/s)	
17	Mariam Abdul-Rashid	Canada	13.70 (w: +0.9 m/s)	
18	Nicla Mosetti	Italy	13.77 (w: -0.1 m/s)	PB
19	Sarah Koutouan	France	13.87 (w: +0.6 m/s)	
20	Wu Yanni	China	13.90 (w: -0.1 m/s)	
21	Kateřina Dvořáková	Czech Republic	14.00 (w: +0.9 m/s)	
22	Kristi Strømmen Kjerpeset	Norway	14.01 (w: +0.9 m/s)	
	Gabriella O'Grady	Australia	DNF	
	Nora Orduña	Spain	DNF	

==== Details ====
First 2 in each heat (Q) and the next 2 fastest (q) advance to the Final

===== Semifinal 1 =====
23 July
Start time: 17:13 Temperature: 22 °C Humidity: 65 %
Wind: +0.6 m/s

Rank	Name	Nationality	Lane	Reaction Time	Time	Notes
1	Oluwatobiloba Amusan	Nigeria	5	0.152	12.99	Q
2	Alexis Duncan	United States	4	0.165	13.02	Q PB
3	Alicia Barrett	Great Britain	7	0.182	13.34	q PB
4	Yumi Tanaka	Japan	9	0.138	13.46	PB
5	Jeanine Williams	Jamaica	2	0.155	13.59	PB
6	Lina Amr Gaber	Egypt	3	0.180	13.68	
7	Sarah Koutouan	France	8	0.180	13.87	
	Nora Orduña	Spain	6	0.186	DNF	

===== Semifinal 2 =====
23 July
Start time: 17:21 Temperature: 22 °C Humidity: 65 %
Wind: -0.1 m/s

Rank	Name	Nationality	Lane	Reaction Time	Time	Notes
1	Tia Jones	United States	7	0.176	13.09	Q
2	Rushelle Burton	Jamaica	5	0.157	13.21	Q PB
3	Mollie Courtney	Great Britain	6	0.147	13.42	
4	Ruslana Rashkavan	Belarus	8	0.190	13.61	
5	Yuri Okubo	Japan	4	0.153	13.67	
6	Nicla Mosetti	Italy	3	0.175	13.77	PB
7	Wu Yanni	China	9	0.164	13.90	
	Gabriella O'Grady	Australia	2	0.127	DNF	

===== Semifinal 3 =====
23 July
Start time: 17:30 Temperature: 22 °C Humidity: 65 %
Wind: +0.9 m/s

Rank	Name	Nationality	Lane	Reaction Time	Time	Notes
1	Elvira Herman	Belarus	5	0.160	12.97	Q NJR
2	Laura Valette	France	6	0.155	13.23	Q
3	Taylon Bieldt	South Africa	7	0.139	13.35	q NJR
4	Danielle Shaw	Australia	8	0.149	13.60	PB
5	Chloë Beaucarne	Belgium	3	0.209	13.65	
6	Mariam Abdul-Rashid	Canada	4	0.151	13.70	
7	Kateřina Dvořáková	Czech Republic	9	0.175	14.00	
8	Kristi Strømmen Kjerpeset	Norway	2	0.140	14.01	

=== Heats ===
22 July
First 3 in each heat (Q) and the next 6 fastest (q) advance to the Semi-Finals

==== Summary ====
Rank	Name	Nationality	Time	Notes
1	Tia Jones	United States	13.04 (w: +1.6 m/s)	Q
2	Alexis Duncan	United States	13.11 w (w: +1.5 m/s)	Q
3	Elvira Herman	Belarus	13.13 (w: +0.7 m/s)	Q
4	Laura Valette	France	13.25 (w: +1.3 m/s)	Q
5	Oluwatobiloba Amusan	Nigeria	13.26 (w: +1.0 m/s)	Q
6	Mollie Courtney	Great Britain	13.28 (w: +1.3 m/s)	Q PB
7	Alicia Barrett	Great Britain	13.35 (w: +1.6 m/s)	Q PB
8	Rushelle Burton	Jamaica	13.39 (w: +2.0 m/s)	Q
9	Ruslana Rashkavan	Belarus	13.50 (w: +1.3 m/s)	Q PB
10	Gabriella O'Grady	Australia	13.53 (w: +1.3 m/s)	q PB
10	Taylon Bieldt	South Africa	13.58 (w: +2.0 m/s)	Q PB
12	Yumi Tanaka	Japan	13.62 (w: +1.6 m/s)	Q PB
13	Lina Amr Gaber	Egypt	13.64 (w: +1.3 m/s)	q NJR
14	Mariam Abdul-Rashid	Canada	13.65 (w: +1.5 m/s)	Q
15	Kateřina Dvořáková	Czech Republic	13.66 (w: +1.5 m/s)	Q PB
16	Nora Orduña	Spain	13.70 (.692) (w: +0.7 m/s)	Q
17	Danielle Shaw	Australia	13.70(.699) (w: +0.7 m/s)	Q
18	Sarah Koutouan	France	13.71 (w: +2.0 m/s)	Q
19	Yuri Okubo	Japan	13.73 (.722) (w: +1.0 m/s)	Q
20	Kristi Strømmen Kjerpeset	Norway	13.73 (.730) (w: +1.3 m/s)	q PB
21	Chloë Beaucarne	Belgium	13.74 (.731) (w: +1.6 m/s)	q
22	Wu Yanni	China	13.74 (.738) (w: +1.0 m/s)	Q
23	Jeanine Williams	Jamaica	13.80 (w: +1.5 m/s)	q
24	Nicla Mosetti	Italy	13.82 (w: +0.7 m/s)	q
25	Olena Maliarenko	Ukraine	13.85 (w: +1.3 m/s)	PB
26	Jeminise Sade Parris	Trinidad and Tobago	13.90 (w: +1.6 m/s)	PB
27	Klaudia Sorok	Hungary	13.92 (w: +1.6 m/s)	PB
28	Shi Jiali	China	13.93 (w: +1.5 m/s)	
29	Fionda Ribeaud	Switzerland	13.96 (.957) (w: +1.0 m/s)	PB
30	Abigail Gyedu	Italy	13.96 (.960) (w: +1.0 m/s)	PB
31	Karin Strametz	Austria	13.97 (w: +0.7 m/s)	PB
32	Maayke Tjin A-Lim	Netherlands	13.98 (w: +1.0 m/s)	
33	Kreete Verlin	Estonia	14.11 (w: +1.5 m/s)	PB
34	Sasha Wells	Bahamas	14.12 (w: +2.0 m/s)	
35	María Mújika	Spain	14.13 (w: +1.6 m/s)	
36	Cheng Tang-hsiu	Chinese Taipei	14.14 (w: +1.0 m/s)	
37	Kiana Rösli	Switzerland	14.20 (w: +1.3 m/s)	
38	Greta Plečkaitytė	Lithuania	14.38 (w: +2.0 m/s)	
39	Keira Christie-Galloway	Canada	14.43 (w: +2.0 m/s)	
40	Catarina de Queirós	Portugal	14.53 (w: +0.7 m/s)	
41	Mariana António	Portugal	14.80 (w: +2.0 m/s)	
42	Charisma Taylor	Bahamas	14.94 (w: +1.5 m/s)	
	Natalia Christofi	Cyprus	DNF	
	Diana-Ioana Volf	Romania	DQ	
	Maribel Caicedo	Ecuador	DQ	
	Daphni Georgiou	Cyprus	DNS	
	Song Yu-jin	South Korea	DNS	

==== Details ====
First 3 in each heat (Q) and the next 6 fastest (q) advance to the Semi-Finals

===== Heat 1 =====
22 July
Start time: 9:34 Temperature: 21 °C Humidity: 49 %
Wind: +2.0 m/s

Rank	Name	Nationality	Lane	Reaction Time	Time	Notes
1	Rushelle Burton	Jamaica	7	0.167	13.39	Q
2	Taylon Bieldt	South Africa	4	0.136	13.58	Q PB
3	Sarah Koutouan	France	9	0.165	13.71	Q
4	Sasha Wells	Bahamas	5	0.176	14.12	
5	Greta Plečkaitytė	Lithuania	8	0.176	14.38	
6	Keira Christie-Galloway	Canada	2	0.135	14.43	
7	Mariana António	Portugal	6	0.152	14.80	
	Natalia Christofi	Cyprus	3	0.161	DNF	

===== Heat 2 =====
22 July
Start time: 9:41 Temperature: 21 °C Humidity: 49 %
Wind: +1.6 m/s

Rank	Name	Nationality	Lane	Reaction Time	Time	Notes
1	Tia Jones	United States	7	0.171	13.04	Q
2	Alicia Barrett	Great Britain	9	0.182	13.35	Q PB
3	Yumi Tanaka	Japan	2	0.127	13.62	Q PB
4	Chloë Beaucarne	Belgium	3	0.195	13.74 (.731)	q
5	Jeminise Sade Parris	Trinidad and Tobago	8	0.165	13.90	PB
6	Klaudia Sorok	Hungary	4	0.152	13.92	PB
7	María Mújika	Spain	6	0.164	14.13	
	Song Yu-jin	South Korea	5		DNS	

===== Heat 3 =====
22 July
Start time: 9:48 Temperature: 21 °C Humidity: 49 %
Wind: +1.3 m/s

Rank	Name	Nationality	Lane	Reaction Time	Time	Notes
1	Laura Valette	France	4	0.149	13.25	Q
2	Mollie Courtney	Great Britain	7	0.157	13.28	Q PB
3	Ruslana Rashkavan	Belarus	6	0.182	13.50	Q PB
4	Gabriella O'Grady	Australia	2	0.113	13.53	q PB
5	Lina Amr Gaber	Egypt	8	0.157	13.64	q NJR
6	Kristi Strømmen Kjerpeset	Norway	5	0.150	13.73 (.730)	q PB
7	Olena Maliarenko	Ukraine	3	0.194	13.85	PB
8	Kiana Rösli	Switzerland	9	0.130	14.20	

===== Heat 4 =====
22 July
Start time: 9:55 Temperature: 21 °C Humidity: 49 %
Wind: +0.7 m/s

Rank	Name	Nationality	Lane	Reaction Time	Time	Notes
1	Elvira Herman	Belarus	4	0.200	13.13	Q
2	Nora Orduña	Spain	9	0.173	13.70 (.692)	Q
3	Danielle Shaw	Australia	5	0.163	13.70 (.699)	Q
4	Nicla Mosetti	Italy	7	0.180	13.82	q
5	Karin Stramtz	Austria	6	0.189	13.97	PB
6	Catarina de Queirós	Portugal	8	0.219	14.53	
	Maribel Caicedo	Ecuador	2	0.186	DQ 168.7	
	Diana-Ioana Volf	Romania	3	0.000	DQ 168.7(b)	

Note:
IAAF Rule 168.7 - Not jumping each hurdle
IAAF Rule 168.7(b) - Deliberately knocking down a hurdle

===== Heat 5 =====
22 July
Start time: 10:02 Temperature: 21 °C Humidity: 49 %
Wind: +1.5 m/s

Rank	Name	Nationality	Lane	Reaction Time	Time	Notes
1	Alexis Duncan	United States	5	0.163	13.11	Q
2	Mariam Abdul-Rashid	Canada	3	0.151	13.65	Q
3	Kateřina Dvořáková	Czech Republic	4	0.138	13.66	Q PB
4	Jeanine Williams	Jamaica	8	0.160	13.80	q
5	Shi Jiali	China	2	0.154	13.93	
6	Kreete Verlin	Estonia	6	0.148	14.11	PB
7	Charisma Taylor	Bahamas	7	0.164	14.94	
	Daphni Georgiou	Cyprus	9		DNS	

==== Heat 6 ====
22 July
Start time: 10:10 Temperature: 21 °C Humidity: 49 %
Wind: +1.0 m/s

Rank	Name	Nationality	Lane	Reaction Time	Time	Notes
1	Oluwatobiloba Amusan	Nigeria	4	0.160	13.26	Q
2	Yuri Okubo	Japan	7	0.145	13.73 (.722)	Q
3	Wu Yanni	China	9	0.144	13.74 (.738)	Q
4	Fionda Ribeaud	Switzerland	5	0.168	13.96 (.957)	PB
5	Abigail Gyedu	Italy	3	0.133	13.96 (.960)	PB
6	Maayke Tjin A-Lim	Netherlands	8	0.159	13.98	
7	Cheng Tang-hsiu	Chinese Taipei	6	0.134	14.14	
