= Jyothi Yarraji =

Indian hurdler (born 1999)

Personal information
- Born: 28 August 1999 (age 27) Visakhapatnam, Andhra Pradesh, India
- Height: 1.76 m (5 ft 9 in)

Sport
- Sport: Athletics
- Events: 60 m hurdles, 100 m hurdles, 200 m

Achievements and titles
- Personal bests: 60 m hurdles: 8.04 (2025); 100 m hurdles: 12.78 NR (2023); 200 m: 23.13 (2023)
Medal record
Women's athletics
Representing India
Asian Games
Silver medal – second place	2022 Hangzhou	100 m hurdles
Asian Championships
Gold medal – first place	2023 Bangkok	100 m hurdles
Gold medal – first place	2025 Gumi	100 m hurdles
Silver medal – second place	2023 Bangkok	200 m
Asian Indoor Championships
Gold medal – first place	2024 Tehran	60 m hurdles
Silver medal – second place	2023 Astana	60 m hurdles
World University Games
Bronze medal – third place	2021 Chengdu	100 m hurdles

Jyothi Yarraji (born 28 August 1999) is an Indian athlete who specialises in the 100 m hurdles. She is a two-time Asian champion, winning gold at the 2023 and 2025 Asian Championships, and a silver medalist at the 2022 Asian Games.

== Early life ==
Jyothi was born on 28 August 1999 in Visakhapatnam in the state of Andhra Pradesh. Her father Suryanarayana is a security guard and her mother works as a domestic help. She did her schooling at the Port High School in Visakhapatnam, and completed her Bachelor of Arts in History from the Acharya Nagarjuna University.

== Career ==
Jyothi represented India at the 2022 Commonwealth Games in the 100 m hurdles, where she finished tenth among seventeen athletes with a time of 13.18 in the qualification round and did not advance to the final. She was also a part of the 4 × 100 m relay team that narrowly missed the podium with a fourth-place finish clocking 43.81. Later that year, she became the first Indian woman to clock sub-13 seconds in the 100 m hurdles, as she won in 12.82 at the National Championships in Bengaluru.

At the 2023 Asian Indoor Championships in Astana, she won the silver medal in the 60 m hurdles with a time of 8.13 and finished ninth in the 60 m heats in 7.47. At the 2023 Asian Championships in Bangkok, she won gold in the 100 m hurdles in 13.09 and silver in the 200 m in 23.13. Later that year, she claimed bronze in the 100 m hurdles at the World University Games in Chengdu in 12.78, setting a new national record. At the 2023 World Championships in Budapest, she finished 29th among 43 athletes in the 100 m hurdles heats with a time of 13.05 and failed to advance to the final. Her career highlight came at the Asian Games in Hangzhou, where she won the silver medal in the 100 m hurdles with a time of 12.91. She was initially disqualified for a false start alongside Chinese athlete Wu Yanni but was later reinstated and allowed to compete. Following a review, Wu Yanni was disqualified, promoting Jyothi to the silver-medal position. She also competed in the 200 m, finishing ninth in the heats with a time of 23.78, narrowly missing the final, with only the top eight advancing.

She won the gold medal in the 60 m hurdles at the 2024 Asian Indoor Championships in Tehran with a time of 8.12. At the 2024 Paris Olympics, she became the first Indian woman to compete in the 100 m hurdles at the Games. She clocked 13.16 in the heats and 13.17 in the repechage, finishing 16th among 40 athletes and failing to qualify for the semi-finals.

At the 2025 Asian Championships in Gumi, she won the gold medal in the 100 m hurdles with a time of 12.96 and finished fifth in the 200 m in 23.47. In July 2025, she suffered a knee injury during training and underwent ACL surgery, ruling her out of the 2025 World Championships and the remainder of the season.

== International competitions ==
Representing India
Year	Competition	Host	Position	Event	Result
2022	Commonwealth Games	Birmingham, England	10th (h)	100 m hurdles	13.18
2022	Commonwealth Games	Birmingham, England	4th	4 × 100 m relay	43.81
2023	Asian Indoor Championships	Astana, Kazakhstan	9th (h)	60 m	7.47
2023	Asian Indoor Championships	Astana, Kazakhstan	2nd	60 m hurdles	8.13
2023	Asian Championships	Bangkok, Thailand	1st	100 m hurdles	13.09
2023	Asian Championships	Bangkok, Thailand	2nd	200 m	23.13
2023	World University Games	Chengdu, China	3rd	100 m hurdles	12.78
2023	World Championships	Budapest, Hungary	29th (h)	100 m hurdles	13.05
2023	Asian Games	Hangzhou, China	2nd	100 m hurdles	12.91
2023	Asian Games	Hangzhou, China	9th (h)	200 m	23.78
2024	Asian Indoor Championships	Tehran, Iran	1st	60 m hurdles	8.12
2024	Olympic Games	Paris, France	16th (h)	100 m hurdles	13.17
2025	Asian Championships	Gumi, South Korea	1st	100 m hurdles	12.96
2025	Asian Championships	Gumi, South Korea	5th	200 m	23.47
