= Athletics at the 2022 Asian Games – Women's 100 metres hurdles =

Women's 100 metres hurdles at the 2022 Asian Games
- Venue: Hangzhou Olympic Expo Main Stadium
- Date: 30 September – 1 October 2023
- Competitors: 15 from 11 nations

Medalists
| gold medal | Lin Yuwei | China |
| silver medal | Jyothi Yarraji | India |
| bronze medal | Yumi Tanaka | Japan |

The women's 100 metres hurdles competition at the 2022 Asian Games took place on 30 September and 1 October 2023 at the HOC Stadium, Hangzhou.

== Schedule ==
All times are China Standard Time (UTC+08:00)

| Date | Time | Event |
|---|---|---|
| Saturday, 30 September 2023 | 09:15 | Round 1 |
| Sunday, 1 October 2023 | 21:15 | Final |

== Records ==
Prior to this competition, the existing world, Asian and Games records were as follows.

| World Record | Tobi Amusan (NGR) | 12.12 | Eugene, United States | 24 July 2022 |
| Asian Record | Olga Shishigina (KAZ) | 12.44 | Lucerne, Switzerland | 27 June 1995 |
| Games Record | Olga Shishigina (KAZ) | 12.63 | Bangkok, Thailand | 19 December 1998 |

== Results ==
Legend

- DSQ — Disqualified

=== Round 1 ===
- Qualification: First 3 in each heat (Q) and the next 2 fastest (q) advance to the final.

==== Heat 1 ====
- Wind: +2.0 m/s

| Rank | Athlete | Time | Notes |
|---|---|---|---|
| 1 | Lin Yuwei (CHN) | 12.79 | Q |
| 2 | Jyothi Yarraji (IND) | 13.03 | Q |
| 3 | Masumi Aoki (JPN) | 13.38 | Q |
| 4 | Yuliya Bashmanova (KAZ) | 13.74 | |
| 5 | Dina Aulia (INA) | 13.92 | |
| 6 | Shing Cho Yan (HKG) | 14.46 | |
| 7 | Ghazala Ramzan (PAK) | 15.43 | |

==== Heat 2 ====
- Wind: +2.8 m/s

| Rank | Athlete | Time | Notes |
|---|---|---|---|
| 1 | Wu Yanni (CHN) | 12.80 | Q |
| 2 | Zhang Bo-ya (TPE) | 13.10 | Q |
| 3 | Yumi Tanaka (JPN) | 13.10 | Q |
| 4 | Lui Lai Yiu (HKG) | 13.24 | q |
| 5 | Nithya Ramraj (IND) | 13.30 | q |
| 6 | Jo Eun-ju (KOR) | 13.44 | |
| 7 | Aminat Yusuf Jamal (BRN) | 13.44 | |
| 8 | Angelina Tiapova (KGZ) | 14.93 | |

=== Final ===
- Wind: 0.0 m/s

| Rank | Athlete | Time | Notes |
|---|---|---|---|
| 1st place, gold medalist(s) | Lin Yuwei (CHN) | 12.74 | |
| 2nd place, silver medalist(s) | Jyothi Yarraji (IND) | 12.91 | |
| 3rd place, bronze medalist(s) | Yumi Tanaka (JPN) | 13.04 | |
| 4 | Zhang Bo-ya (TPE) | 13.31 | |
| 5 | Masumi Aoki (JPN) | 13.34 | |
| 6 | Lui Lai Yiu (HKG) | 13.35 | |
| 7 | Nithya Ramraj (IND) | 13.40 | |
| — | Wu Yanni (CHN) | DSQ | |
