= 2015 World Youth Championships in Athletics – Girls' 100 metres hurdles =

Girls' 100 metres hurdles at the 2015 World Youth Championships in Athletics
- Venue: Estadio Olímpico Pascual Guerrero
- Dates: 15–16 July
- Competitors: 38 from 28 nations
- Winning time: 13.04

Medalists
gold medal	Maribel Caicedo	Ecuador
silver medal	Brittley Humphrey	United States
bronze medal	Sarah Koutouan	France

The girls' 100 metres hurdles at the 2015 World Youth Championships in Athletics was held at the Estadio Olímpico Pascual Guerrero in Cali, Colombia from 15 to 16 July 2015.

== Records ==
Prior to the competition, the following records were as follows.

World Youth Best	Yanique Thompson (JAM)	12.94	Donetsk, Ukraine	11 July 2013
Championship Record	Yanique Thompson (JAM)	12.94	Donetsk, Ukraine	11 July 2013
World Youth Leading	Alexis Duncan (USA)	13.20	Havana, Cuba	12 June 2015

== Results ==
=== Round 1 ===
First 4 in each heat (Q) and the next 4 fastest (q) advance to the semifinals.

Rank	Heat	Name	Nationality	Time	Note
1	1	Alexis Duncan	United States	13.13	Q, WYL
2	3	Maribel Caicedo	Ecuador	13.32	Q, PB
3	3	Marisa Vaz Carvalho	Portugal	13.36	Q, PB
4	4	Alicia Barrett	Great Britain	13.46	Q, PB
5	4	Brittley Humphrey	United States	13.47	Q, PB
6	5	Ilionis Guillaume	France	13.48	Q
7	2	Sarah Koutouan	France	13.62	Q
8	5	Keira Christie-Galloway	Canada	13.63	Q, PB
9	3	Janeek Brown	Jamaica	13.67	Q
9	3	Klaudia Sorok	Hungary	13.67	Q, SB
11	5	Danielle Shaw	Australia	13.69	Q
12	1	Klaudia Siciarz	Poland	13.70	Q
13	1	Yu Jiaru	China	13.72	Q, PB
14	4	Taylon Bieldt	South Africa	13.76	Q
15	2	Hope Sarti	Great Britain	13.76	Q
16	4	Elisa Di Lazzaro	Italy	13.88	Q
17	2	Sidney Marshall	Jamaica	13.89	Q
17	1	Adelina Sandu	Romania	13.89	Q
19	3	Yumi Tanaka	Japan	13.92	q, PB
20	1	Desola Oki	Italy	13.93	q
21	2	Karin Strametz	Austria	13.95	Q
22	4	Tereza Vokálová	Czech Republic	14.02	q
23	5	Dayana Ramos	Colombia	14.05	Q, PB
24	1	Charisma Taylor	Bahamas	14.06	q, PB
25	2	Greta Plečkaitytė	Lithuania	14.10	
26	5	Kieshonna Brooks	Saint Kitts and Nevis	14.11	
27	3	Kristi Strømmen Kjerpeset	Norway	14.13	
28	4	Tsabíka-Neféli Rámmou	Greece	14.15	PB
29	4	Sasha Wells	Bahamas	14.22	
30	2	Damaris Palomeque	Colombia	14.26	PB
31	5	Diana Volf	Romania	14.27	
32	3	Deng Xuelin	China	14.28	
33	2	Eneritz Busto	Spain	14.36	
34	1	Valentina Sánchez	Argentina	14.40	
35	5	Triana Alonso	Peru	14.62	SB
36	2	Kany Touré	Luxembourg	14.74	
37	3	Lam Yan Tung	Hong Kong	14.98	
–	5	Mar Ramírez	Spain	DNF	

=== Semifinal ===
First 2 in each heat (Q) and the next 2 fastest (q) advance to the final.

Rank	Heat	Name	Nationality	Time	Note
1	3	Alexis Duncan	United States	12.95	Q, WYL
2	1	Maribel Caicedo	Ecuador	13.11	Q, WYL
3	1	Sarah Koutouan	France	13.16	Q, PB
4	2	Ilionis Guillaume	France	13.23	Q, PB
5	3	Marisa Vaz Carvalho	Portugal	13.37	Q
6	2	Alicia Barrett	Great Britain	13.40	Q, PB
7	1	Brittley Humphrey	United States	13.41	q, PB
8	2	Klaudia Siciarz	Poland	13.50	q, PB
9	3	Karin Strametz	Austria	13.52	PB
10	1	Taylon Bieldt	South Africa	13.57	
11	3	Danielle Shaw	Australia	13.59	
12	2	Janeek Brown	Jamaica	13.62	
13	1	Desola Oki	Italy	13.64	
13	2	Yumi Tanaka	Japan	13.64	PB
13	2	Klaudia Sorok	Hungary	13.64	SB
13	1	Sidney Marshall	Jamaica	13.64	
17	3	Yu Jiaru	China	13.68	PB
18	1	Hope Sarti	Great Britain	13.70	
19	3	Keira Christie-Galloway	Canada	13.71	
20	2	Elisa Di Lazzaro	Italy	13.82	
21	3	Charisma Taylor	Bahamas	13.85	PB
22	2	Tereza Vokálová	Czech Republic	13.95	
23	3	Adelina Sandu	Romania	13.97	
24	1	Dayana Ramos	Colombia	14.17	

=== Final ===
Rank	Name	Nationality	Time	Note
1st place, gold medalist(s)	Maribel Caicedo	Ecuador	13.04	PB
2nd place, silver medalist(s)	Brittley Humphrey	United States	13.22	PB
3rd place, bronze medalist(s)	Sarah Koutouan	France	13.29	
4	Ilionis Guillaume	France	13.31	
5	Marisa Vaz Carvalho	Portugal	13.51	
6	Alicia Barrett	Great Britain	13.52	
7	Alexis Duncan	United States	13.56	
8	Klaudia Siciarz	Poland	13.75	
