= 2025 World Athletics Championships – Women's 100 metres hurdles =

Women's 100 metres hurdles at the 2025 World Athletics Championships
- Venue: National Stadium
- Location: Tokyo, Japan
- Dates: 14 September (heats); 15 September (semi-finals & final)
- Winning time: 12.24 NR

Medalists
gold medal	Ditaji Kambundji	Switzerland
silver medal	Tobi Amusan	Nigeria
bronze medal	Grace Stark	United States

The women's 100 metres hurdles at the 2025 World Athletics Championships were held at the National Stadium in Tokyo on 14 and 15 September 2025.

== Summary ==
Danielle Williams came in as the reigning champion but Masai Russell had dominated the season. Her 12.17 in May was the second fastest race in history. She backed that up with a 12.19 win at the Silesia Diamond League meet. Only Tobi Amusan had run faster before winning the 2022 World Championship. #6 Grace Stark and =#7Ackera Nugent were all in this field. In a race where the slightest problem can be the difference, Nugent didn't make it out of the semis.

In the final, Stark and Ditaji Kambundji were out fast, first over the first hurdle. By the third hurdle, Kambundji edged ahead. Amusan edged ahead of Stark over the eighth hurdle. That became the finish order with Russell a full tenth behind as the next competitor. With the 12.24 winning time, Kambundji joined that group at #7 all time and improving her own Swiss national record.

== Records ==
Before the competition records were as follows:

Record	Athlete & Nat.	Perf.	Location	Date
World record	Tobi Amusan (NGR)	12.12	Eugene, United States	24 July 2022
Championship record	Tobi Amusan (NGR)	12.12	Eugene, United States	24 July 2022
World Leading	Masai Russell (USA)	12.17	Miramar, United States	2 May 2025
African Record	Tobi Amusan (NGR)	12.12	Eugene, United States	24 July 2022
Asian Record	Olga Shishigina (KAZ)	12.44	Luzern, Switzerland	27 June 1995
European Record	Yordanka Donkova (BUL)	12.21	Stara Zagora, Bulgaria	20 August 1988
North, Central American and Caribbean record	Masai Russell (USA)	12.17	Miramar, United States	2 May 2025
Oceanian record	Sally Pearson (AUS)	12.28	Daegu, South Korea	3 September 2011
South American Record	Maribel Caicedo (ECU)	12.49	Fayetteville, United States	23 May 2024

== Qualification standard ==
The standard to qualify automatically for entry was 12.73.

== Schedule ==
The event schedule, in local time (UTC+9), is as follows:

Date	Time	Round
14 September	11:28	Heats
15 September	21:06	Semi-finals
15 September	22:20	Final

== Results ==
=== Heats ===
The heats took place on 14 September. The first three athletes in each heat ( Q ) and the next six fastest ( q ) qualified for the semi-finals.

==== Heat 1 ====
Place	Lane	Athlete	Nation	Time	Notes
1	5	Masai Russell	United States	12.53	Q
2	7	Marione Fourie	South Africa	12.86	Q
3	8	Sarah Lavin	Ireland	12.94	Q
4	6	Luca Kozák	Hungary	12.96	q
5	9	Wu Yanni	China	13.12	
6	4	Viktória Forster	Slovakia	13.18	
7	3	Denisha Cartwright	Bahamas	13.50	
				Wind: (+0.2 m/s)	

==== Heat 2 ====
Place	Lane	Athlete	Nation	Time	Notes
1	6	Danielle Williams	Jamaica	12.40	Q
2	7	Alaysha Johnson	United States	12.76	Q
3	4	Sacha Alessandrini	France	12.99	Q
4	8	Karin Strametz	Austria	13.02	
5	5	Aasia Laurencin	Saint Lucia	13.03	
6	3	Yumi Tanaka	Japan	13.05	
7	2	Lai Yiu Lui	Hong Kong	13.43	
8	9	Huỳnh Thị Mỹ Tiên	Vietnam	13.77	
				Wind: (±0.0 m/s)	

==== Heat 3 ====
Place	Lane	Athlete	Nation	Time	Notes
1	5	Nadine Visser	Netherlands	12.48	Q
2	4	Giada Carmassi	Italy	12.83	Q
3	7	Greisys Roble	Cuba	12.84	Q
4	8	Alicja Sielska	Poland	12.99	
5	3	Mariam Abdul-Rashid	Canada	13.02	
6	2	Dina Aulia	Indonesia	13.28	
7	9	Cecilia Guambe	Mozambique	13.78	SB
—	6	Megan Tapper	Jamaica	DNS	
				Wind: (−0.2 m/s)	

==== Heat 4 ====
Place	Lane	Athlete	Nation	Time	Notes
1	4	Ackera Nugent	Jamaica	12.54	Q
2	7	Ditaji Kambundji	Switzerland	12.59	Q
3	6	Maayke Tjin-A-Lim	Netherlands	12.71	Q
4	5	Yanla Ndjip-Nyemeck	Belgium	12.74	q
5	3	Saara Keskitalo	Finland	12.95	q
6	8	Charisma Taylor	Bahamas	12.96	
7	9	Nathalie Abigail Almendarez	El Salvador	13.70	
8	2	Liz Clay	Australia	13.82	
				Wind: (+0.5 m/s)	

==== Heat 5 ====
Place	Lane	Athlete	Nation	Time	Notes
1	7	Grace Stark	United States	12.46	Q
2	6	Pia Skrzyszowska	Poland	12.51	Q, SB
3	4	Amoi Brown	Jamaica	12.82	Q
4	5	Mako Fukube	Japan	12.92	q
5	3	Nika Glojnarič	Slovenia	13.13	
6	8	Tatiana Aholou	Canada	13.21	
7	9	Sidonie Fiadanantsoa	Madagascar	13.27	
				Wind: (+0.1 m/s)	

==== Heat 6 ====
Place	Lane	Athlete	Nation	Time	Notes
1	7	Tobi Amusan	Nigeria	12.53	Q
2	4	Devynne Charlton	Bahamas	12.69	Q
3	3	Elena Carraro	Italy	12.86 [.855]	Q
4	5	Lotta Harala	Finland	12.86 [.857]	q
5	6	Hitomi Nakajima	Japan	12.88	q
6	8	Anna Tóth	Hungary	13.06	
7	9	Ketiley Batista	Brazil	13.30	
				Wind: (±0.0 m/s)	

=== Semi-finals ===
The heats took place on 15 September. The first two athletes in each heat ( Q ) and the next two fastest ( q ) qualified for the inal.

==== Heat 1 ====
Place	Lane	Athlete	Nation	Time	Notes
1	4	Grace Stark	United States	12.37	Q
2	5	Ditaji Kambundji	Switzerland	12.44	Q
3	7	Ackera Nugent	Jamaica	12.63	
4	3	Sarah Lavin	Ireland	12.86	
5	6	Giada Carmassi	Italy	12.95	
6	8	Greisys Roble	Cuba	12.97	
7	2	Mako Fukube	Japan	13.06	
	9	Lotta Harala	Finland	DQ	
				Wind: (−0.5 m/s)	

==== Heat 2 ====
Place	Lane	Athlete	Nation	Time	Notes
1	4	Tobi Amusan	Nigeria	12.36	Q
2	5	Nadine Visser	Netherlands	12.45	Q
3	6	Pia Skrzyszowska	Poland	12.53	q
4	7	Alaysha Johnson	United States	12.66	
5	8	Elena Carraro	Italy	12.79	PB
6	3	Amoi Brown	Jamaica	12.93	
7	2	Hitomi Nakajima	Japan	13.02	
8	9	Saara Keskitalo	Finland	13.02	
				Wind: (−0.2 m/s)	

==== Heat 3 ====
Place	Lane	Athlete	Nation	Time	Notes
1	6	Masai Russell	United States	12.42	Q
2	5	Danielle Williams	Jamaica	12.44	Q
3	7	Devynne Charlton	Bahamas	12.51	q, SB
4	3	Maayke Tjin-A-Lim	Netherlands	12.85	
5	9	Luca Kozák	Hungary	13.01	
6	2	Yanla Ndjip-Nyemeck	Belgium	13.05	
7	8	Sacha Alessandrini	France	13.08	
	4	Marione Fourie	South Africa	DQ	
				Wind: (+0.2 m/s)	

=== Final ===
Place	Lane	Athlete	Nation	Time	Notes
1st place, gold medalist(s)	3	Ditaji Kambundji	Switzerland	12.24	NR
2nd place, silver medalist(s)	6	Tobi Amusan	Nigeria	12.29	
3rd place, bronze medalist(s)	5	Grace Stark	United States	12.34	
4	7	Masai Russell	United States	12.44	
5	2	Pia Skrzyszowska	Poland	12.49	SB
6	9	Devynne Charlton	Bahamas	12.49	SB
7	4	Danielle Williams	Jamaica	12.53	
8	8	Nadine Visser	Netherlands	12.56	
			Wind: (−0.1 m/s)		
