= 2023 Asian Athletics Championships – Women's 200 metres =

Women's 200 metres at the 2023 Asian Athletics Championships
- Venue: National Stadium
- Location: Bangkok, Thailand
- Dates: 15 July (heats & semi-finals); 16 July (final)
- Competitors: 27 from 19 nations
- Winning time: 22.70 CR

Medalists
gold medal	Shanti Pereira	Singapore
silver medal	Jyothi Yarraji	India
bronze medal	Li Yuting	China

The women's 200 metres event at the 2023 Asian Athletics Championships was held on 15 and 16 July.

== Records ==
Records before the 2023 Asian Athletics Championships
Record	Athlete (nation)	Time (s)	Location	Date
World record	Florence Griffith Joyner (USA)	21.34	Seoul, South Korea	28 September 1988
Asian record	Li Xuemei (CHN)	22.01	Shanghai, China	22 October 1997
Championship record	Salwa Eid Naser (QAT)	22.74	Doha, Qatar	24 April 2019
World leading	Gabrielle Thomas (USA)	21.60	Eugene, United States	9 July 2023
Asian leading	Shanti Pereira (SGP)	22.69	Phnom Penh, Cambodia	8 May 2023

== Results ==
=== Heats ===
Held on 15 July

Qualification rule: First 4 in each heat (Q) and the next 4 fastest (q) qualified for the semifinals.

Wind:
Heat 1: +0.1 m/s, Heat 2: 0.0 m/, Heat 3: -0.1 m/s, Heat 4: -0.6 m/s

Rank	Heat	Name	Nationality	Time	Notes
1	3	Remi Tsuruta	Japan	23.72	Q
2	3	Jyothi Yarraji	India	23.85	Q
3	1	Olga Safronova	Kazakhstan	23.98	Q
4	2	Li Yuting	China	23.99	Q
5	4	Kristina Knott	Philippines	24.04	Q
6	1	Aziza Sbaity	Lebanon	24.05	Q
7	2	Arisa Kimishima	Japan	24.12	Q
8	2	Laylo Allaberganova	Uzbekistan	24.15	Q
9	3	Trần Thị Yến Hòa	Vietnam	24.19	Q
10	1	Nur Afrina Mohamad Rizal	Malaysia	24.29	Q
11	4	Shanti Pereira	Singapore	24.33	Q
12	4	Mudhawi Al-Shammari	Kuwait	24.51	Q
13	3	Athicha Petchakul	Thailand	24.57	q
14	1	Yuan Qiqi	China	24.62	q
15	2	Elizabeth-Ann Tan	Singapore	24.70	q
16	4	Jirapat Khanonta	Thailand	24.79	q, PB
17	3	Tsz To Li	Hong Kong	24.88	
18	1	Sin Ting Yau	Hong Kong	24.91	
19	1	Malika Rajabova	Uzbekistan	25.09	
20	3	Aliya Boshnak	Jordan	25.60	
21	4	Ahnaa Nizaar	Maldives	25.73	PB
22	4	Solongo Batbold	Mongolia	25.97	PB
23	2	Aishath Shaba Saleem	Maldives	27.17	PB
24	4	Sharlot Abyad	Jordan	27.72	PB
	1	Hamideh Esmaeilnejad	Iran	DNS	
	2	Loi Im Lan	Macau	DNS	
	2	Esha Imran	Pakistan	DNS	

=== Semifinals ===
Held on 15 July
Qualification rule: First 3 in each heat (Q) and the next 2 fastest (q) qualified for the final.

Wind:
Heat 1: 0.0 m/s, Heat 2: +0.1 m/

Rank	Heat	Name	Nationality	Time	Notes
1	2	Jyothi Yarraji	India	23.29	Q, PB
2	2	Remi Tsuruta	Japan	23.47	Q
3	2	Shanti Pereira	Singapore	23.51	Q
4	1	Li Yuting	China	23.52	Q, PB
5	2	Kristina Knott	Philippines	23.54	q
6	1	Arisa Kimishima	Japan	23.57	Q
7	1	Aziza Sbaity	Lebanon	23.75	Q
7	1	Olga Safronova	Kazakhstan	23.75	q
9	2	Mudhawi Al-Shammari	Kuwait	23.94	
10	1	Trần Thị Yến Hòa	Vietnam	24.00	
11	2	Yuan Qiqi	China	24.00	
12	1	Athicha Petchakul	Thailand	24.11	
13	2	Laylo Allaberganova	Uzbekistan	24.15	
14	1	Nur Afrina Mohamad Rizal	Malaysia	24.25	
15	2	Jirapat Khanonta	Thailand	24.73	PB
16	1	Elizabeth-Ann Tan	Singapore	24.83	

=== Final ===
Held on 16 July
Wind: +0.1 m/s

Rank	Lane	Name	Nationality	Time	Notes
1st place, gold medalist(s)	8	Shanti Pereira	Singapore	22.70	
2nd place, silver medalist(s)	3	Jyothi Yarraji	India	23.13	PB
3rd place, bronze medalist(s)	5	Li Yuting	China	23.25	PB
4	1	Kristina Knott	Philippines	23.39	
5	4	Remi Tsuruta	Japan	23.48	
6	7	Olga Safronova	Kazakhstan	23.63	
7	2	Aziza Sbaity	Lebanon	23.77	
8	6	Arisa Kimishima	Japan	28.00	
