= Athletics at the 2024 Summer Olympics – Women's 100 metres hurdles =

Women's 100 metres hurdles at the Games of the XXXIII Olympiad
- Venue: Stade de France, Paris, France
- Dates: 7 August 2024 (heats); 8 August 2024 (repechage round); 9 August 2024 (semi-finals); 10 August 2024 (final)
- Winning time: 12.33

Medalists
1st place, gold medalist(s)		Masai Russell	United States
2nd place, silver medalist(s)		Cyréna Samba-Mayela	France
3rd place, bronze medalist(s)		Jasmine Camacho-Quinn	Puerto Rico

Official Video

The women's 100 metres hurdles at the 2024 Summer Olympics was held in four rounds at the Stade de France in Paris, France, between 7 and 10 August 2024. This was the fourteenth time that the women's 100 metres hurdles was contested at the Summer Olympics.

== Summary ==
Gold medalist Jasmine Camacho-Quinn was the only one to return from the podium at the previous Olympics. She also was on the most recent two World Championship podiums and #6 in history. The 2022 Gold Medalist Tobi Amusan was entered, having set that record in the semi-final in Eugene. Then she ran faster in the final only to have a second record improvement disallowed due to assisting wind. The 2023 World Champion Danielle Williams came but #2 in history Kendra Harrison, couldn't get out of the US Trials, against a crop of young hurdlers including Masai Russell who ran the World Leading time 12.25, =#4 in history, while winning those trials ahead of Alaysha Johnson and Grace Stark both credited with equalling the #12 time in history, also equalled by Cyréna Samba-Mayela a few weeks earlier.

In the semi-final round, Amusan and Williams couldn't make the final. Only three finishers in the round failed to break 13 seconds. In the final, Devynne Charlton was a bit slow to react to the gun. Russell and Johnson were inches ahead over the first hurdle, which Ackera Nugent hit, knocking her off balance. By the second barrier, Nadine Visser was inches ahead of Russell, but even last place Nugent was within 60cm of the lead. By the third hurdle, six athletes were virtually even, but Johnson clobbered the hurdle with her trail leg taking her out of contention. By the fifth, Visser and Camacho-Quinn were the first to touch down, with Samba-Mayela within inches. Stark and Russell were about even a half metre down. Over the next three hurdles, Russell regained her deficit clearing even with Visser and Camacho-Quinn, now a few inches down on Samba-Mayela. Nugent hit 8 and ran around 9 taking her out of the race. Johnson hit 9 ending her chances. Visser slowed slightly going into 10 while Samba-Mayela, Camacho-Quinn and Russell took it in that order within inches of each other. Russell was faster on the run in, almost throwing her body over the finish line, flailing her arms to keep her balance. Samba-Mayela maintained her edge on Camacho-Quinn. Stark almost caught a slowing Visser for fourth. Three weeks after the Olympics, Nugent beat both Russell and Samba-Mayela in Rome running 12.24, the #4 time in history.

== Background ==
The first women's sprint hurdling event was added to the programme at the 1932 Olympics in the form of the 80 metres hurdles. At the 1972 Games the women's distance was extended to the 100 metres hurdles, which is the current international standard.

Global records before the 2024 Summer Olympics
Record	Athlete (Nation)	Time (s)	Location	Date
World record	Tobi Amusan (NGR)	12.12	Eugene, United States	24 July 2022
Olympic record	Jasmine Camacho-Quinn (PUR)	12.26	Tokyo, Japan	1 August 2021
World leading	Masai Russell (USA)	12.25	Eugene, United States	30 June 2024

Area records before the 2024 Summer Olympics
Area Record	Athlete (Nation)	Time (s)
Africa (records)	Tobi Amusan (NGR)	12.12 WR
Asia (records)	Olga Shishigina (KAZ)	12.44
Europe (records)	Yordanka Donkova (BUL)	12.21
North, Central America and Caribbean (records)	Kendra Harrison (USA)	12.20
Oceania (records)	Sally Pearson (AUS)	12.28
South America (records)	Maribel Caicedo (ECU)	12.49

== Qualification ==
For the women's 100 metres hurdles event, the qualification period was between 1 July 2023 and 30 June 2024. 40 athletes were able to qualify for the event, with a maximum of three athletes per nation, by running the entry standard of 12.77 seconds or faster or by their World Athletics Ranking for this event.

== Results ==
=== Heats ===
The heats were held on 7 August, starting at 10:15 (UTC+2) in the morning.

==== Heat 1 ====
Rank	Lane	Athlete	Nation	Time	Notes
1	9	Tobi Amusan	Nigeria	12.49	Q
2	7	Alaysha Johnson	United States	12.61	Q
3	4	Janeek Brown	Jamaica	12.84	Q
4	2	Mako Fukube	Japan	12.85	q
5	3	Sidonie Fiadanantsoa	Madagascar	12.92	
6	8	Wu Yanni	China	12.97	
7	5	Maayke Tjin-A-Lim	Netherlands	12.98	
8	6	Maribel Caicedo	Ecuador	13.05	
				Wind: -0.1 m/s	

==== Heat 2 ====
Rank	Lane	Athlete	Nation	Time	Notes
1	2	Jasmine Camacho-Quinn	Puerto Rico	12.42	Q
2	9	Cindy Sember	Great Britain	12.62	Q
3	8	Pia Skrzyszowska	Poland	12.72	Q
4	7	Denisha Cartwright	Bahamas	12.89	
5	4	Yumi Tanaka	Japan	12.90	
6	6	Ebony Morrison	Liberia	12.93	
7	3	Celeste Mucci	Australia	13.05	
8	5	Emelia Chatfield	Haiti	13.06	
				Wind: 0.0 m/s	

==== Heat 3 ====
Rank	Lane	Athlete	Nation	Time	Notes
1	6	Masai Russell	United States	12.53	Q
1	9	Nadine Visser	Netherlands	12.53	Q
3	3	Cyrena Samba-Mayela	France	12.56	Q
4	8	Charisma Taylor	Bahamas	12.78	q
5	2	Mariam Abdul-Rashid	Canada	12.80	q
6	7	Reetta Hurske	Finland	12.96	
7	5	Gréta Kerekes	Hungary	13.50	
8	4	Michelle Jenneke	Australia	20.85	
				Wind: + 0.8 m/s	

==== Heat 4 ====
Rank	Lane	Athlete	Nation	Time	Notes
1	9	Danielle Williams	Jamaica	12.59	Q
2	6	Sarah Lavin	Ireland	12.73	Q
3	2	Ditaji Kambundji	Switzerland	12.81	Q
4	4	Marione Fourie	South Africa	12.91	
5	8	Laëticia Bapté	France	13.04	
6	5	Luca Kozák	Hungary	13.11	
7	3	Jyothi Yarraji	India	13.16	
	7	Yoveinny Mota	Venezuela	DQ	
				Wind: 0.0 m/s	

==== Heat 5 ====
Rank	Lane	Athlete	Nation	Time	Notes
1	3	Ackera Nugent	Jamaica	12.65	Q
2	2	Devynne Charlton	Bahamas	12.71	Q
3	9	Grace Stark	United States	12.72	Q
4	5	Liz Clay	Australia	12.94	
5	4	Lotta Harala	Finland	12.97	
6	7	Viktória Forster	Slovakia	13.08	
7	6	Lin Yuwei	China	13.24	
8	8	Michelle Harrison	Canada	13.40	
				Wind: -0.6 m/s	

=== Repechage round ===
The repechage round was held on 8 August, starting at 10:35 (UTC+2) in the morning.

==== Heat 1 ====
Rank	Lane	Athlete	Nation	Time	Notes
1	4	Marione Fourie	South Africa	12.79	Q
2	5	Maayke Tjin-A-Lim	Netherlands	12.87	Q, SB
3	2	Viktória Forster	Slovakia	12.88	
4	8	Jyothi Yarraji	India	13.17	
5	7	Gréta Kerekes	Hungary	13.20	
6	3	Emelia Chatfield	Haiti	13.24	
7	6	Michelle Jenneke	Australia	13.86	
				Wind: +0.1 m/s	

==== Heat 2 ====
Rank	Lane	Athlete	Nation	Time	Notes
1	4	Ebony Morrison	Liberia	12.82	Q
2	2	Maribel Caicedo	Ecuador	12.83 (.828)	Q
3	6	Reetta Hurske	Finland	12.83 (.830)	
4	8	Laëticia Bapté	France	12.92	
5	3	Celeste Mucci	Australia	13.00	
6	5	Lin Yuwei	China	13.13	
7	7	Michelle Harrison	Canada	13.30	
				Wind: +0.4 m/s	

==== Heat 3 ====
Rank	Lane	Athlete	Nation	Time	Notes
1	6	Lotta Harala	Finland	12.86	Q
2	8	Yumi Tanaka	Japan	12.89	Q
3	2	Luca Kozák	Hungary	12.96	SB
4	3	Wu Yanni	China	12.98	
5	5	Liz Clay	Australia	12.99	
6	7	Sidonie Fiadanantsoa	Madagascar	13.12	
7	4	Denisha Cartwright	Bahamas	13.45	
				Wind: -0.2 m/s	

=== Semi-finals ===
The semi-finals were held on 9 August, starting at 12:05 (UTC+2) in the afternoon.

==== Semifinal 1 ====
Rank	Lane	Athlete	Nation	Time	Notes
1	4	Grace Stark	United States	12.39	Q
2	7	Devynne Charlton	Bahamas	12.50	Q
3	6	Tobi Amusan	Nigeria	12.55 (.548)	
3	8	Pia Skrzyszowska	Poland	12.55 (.548)	
5	3	Mariam Abdul-Rashid	Canada	12.60	PB
6	5	Danielle Williams	Jamaica	12.82	
7	9	Yumi Tanaka	Japan	12.91	
	2	Ebony Morrison	Liberia	DQ	
				Wind: +0.5 m/s	

==== Semifinal 2 ====
Rank	Lane	Athlete	Nation	Time	Notes
1	4	Alaysha Johnson	United States	12.34	Q
2	7	Nadine Visser	Netherlands	12.43	Q
3	8	Charisma Taylor	Bahamas	12.63	PB
4	9	Maribel Caicedo	Ecuador	12.67	
5	6	Ditaji Kambundji	Switzerland	12.68	
6	4	Sarah Lavin	Ireland	12.69	
7	9	Janeek Brown	Jamaica	12.92	
8	2	Lotta Harala	Finland	13.05	
				Wind: +0.4 m/s	

==== Semifinal 3 ====
Rank	Lane	Athlete	Nation	Time	Notes
1	5	Jasmine Camacho-Quinn	Puerto Rico	12.35	Q
2	7	Masai Russell	United States	12.42	Q
3	4	Ackera Nugent	Jamaica	12.44	q
4	6	Cyrena Samba-Mayela	France	12.52	q
5	3	Mako Fukube	Japan	12.89	
6	9	Marione Fourie	South Africa	13.01	
7	2	Maayke Tjin-A-Lim	Netherlands	13.03	
	8	Cindy Sember	Great Britain	DNF	
				Wind: -0.7 m/s	

=== Final ===
The final was held on 10 August, starting at 19:45 (UTC+2) in the evening.

Wind reading: -0.3 m/s

Rank	Lane	Athlete	Nation	Reaction	Time	Notes
1st place, gold medalist(s)	5	Masai Russell	United States	0.137	12.33	
2nd place, silver medalist(s)	2	Cyréna Samba-Mayela	France	0.143	12.34	
3rd place, bronze medalist(s)	7	Jasmine Camacho-Quinn	Puerto Rico	0.173	12.36	
4	3	Nadine Visser	Netherlands	0.134	12.43 (.425)	
5	4	Grace Stark	United States	0.161	12.43 (.428)	
6	8	Devynne Charlton	Bahamas	0.203	12.56	
7	6	Alaysha Johnson	United States	0.151	12.93	
—	9	Ackera Nugent	Jamaica	0.138	DNF	
