= 2019 Asian Athletics Championships – Women's 100 metres hurdles =

Women's 100 metres hurdles at the 2019 Asian Athletics Championships
- Venue: Khalifa International Stadium
- Location: Doha, Qatar
- Dates: 23 April (heats); 24 April (final)
- Competitors: 12 from 9 nations
- Winning time: 13.13

Medalists
gold medal	Ayako Kimura	Japan
silver medal	Chen Jiamin	China
bronze medal	Masumi Aoki	Japan

The women's 100 metres hurdles event at the 2019 Asian Athletics Championships was held on 23 and 24 April.

== Records ==
Records before the 2019 Asian Athletics Championships
Record	Athlete (nation)	Time (s)	Location	Date
World record	Kendra Harrison (USA)	12.20	London, United Kingdom	22 July 2016
Asian record	Olga Shishigina (KAZ)	12.44	Lucerne, Switzerland	27 June 1995
Championship record	Feng Yun (CHN)	12.97	Fukuoka, Japan	20 July 1998
World leading	Kendra Harrison (USA)	12.63	Torrance, United States	20 April 2019
Asian leading	No times recorded			

== Results ==
=== Heats ===
Qualification rule: First 3 in each heat (Q) and the next 2 fastest (q) qualified for the final.

Wind:
Heat 1: +1.3 m/s, Heat 2: +1.9 m/s

Rank	Heat	Name	Nationality	Time	Notes
1	2	Ayako Kimura	Japan	13.19	Q
2	1	Chen Jiamin	China	13.30	Q, SB
3	1	Masumi Aoki	Japan	13.31	Q
4	2	Lui Lai Yiu	Hong Kong	13.35	Q, PB
5	1	Hsieh Hsi-en	Chinese Taipei	13.39	Q, PB
6	1	Jung Hye-lim	South Korea	13.46	q
7	2	Wu Yanni	China	13.52	Q
8	1	Aygerim Shynazbekova	Kazakhstan	13.60	q, SB
9	2	Cheng Tan-hsiu	Chinese Taipei	13.66	
10	2	Emilia Nova	Indonesia	13.70	SB
11	2	Elnaz Kompanizare	Iran	14.12	SB
12	1	Manevanh Chanthavong	Laos	14.79	
	1	Dlsoz Obed Najim	Iraq	DNS	
	2	Rita Abdalla	Jordan	DNS	

=== Final ===
Wind: +1.3 m/s

Rank	Lane	Name	Nationality	Time	Notes
1st place, gold medalist(s)	4	Ayako Kimura	Japan	13.13	
2nd place, silver medalist(s)	6	Chen Jiamin	China	13.24	PB
3rd place, bronze medalist(s)	7	Masumi Aoki	Japan	13.28	
4	5	Lui Lai Yiu	Hong Kong	13.32	PB
5	9	Wu Yanni	China	13.33	SB
6	8	Hsieh Hsi-en	Chinese Taipei	13.37	PB
7	2	Jung Hye-lim	South Korea	13.50	
8	3	Aygerim Shynazbekova	Kazakhstan	13.50	SB
