= Rushelle Burton =

Jamaican hurdler (born 1997)

Personal information
- Nationality: Jamaican
- Born: 4 December 1997 (age 28)

Sport
- Sport: Hurdling
- Event: 100 metres hurdles
Medal record
Women's athletics
Representing Jamaica
World U20 Championships
Silver medal – second place	2016 Bydgoszcz	100 m hurdles
CARIFTA Games (U20)
Gold medal – first place	2016 St. George's	100 m hurdles

Rushelle Burton (born 4 December 1997) is a Jamaican hurdler. She competed in the women's 100 metres hurdles at the 2017 World Championships in Athletics.
