= Masumi Aoki =

Japanese hurdler (born 1994)

Personal information
- Born: 16 April 1994 (age 32) Okayama City, Japan
- Education: International Pacific University
- Height: 1.66 m (5 ft 5 in)
- Weight: 58 kg (128 lb)

Sport
- Sport: Athletics
- Event: 100 m hurdles
Medal record
Representing Japan
Women's athletics
Asian Games
Bronze medal – third place	2014 Incheon	4 × 100 m relay
Bronze medal – third place	2026 Aichi–Nagoya	4 × 100 m relay
Asian Championships
Bronze medal – third place	2019 Doha	100 m hurdles
Bronze medal – third place	2023 Bangkok	100 m hurdles
Asian Indoor Championships
Gold medal – first place	2023 Astana	60 m hurdles

Masumi Aoki (青木益未, Aoki Masumi; born 16 April 1994) is a Japanese athlete specialising in the sprint hurdles. She won a bronze medal at the 2019 Asian Championships.

Her personal bests are 13.17 seconds in the 100 metres hurdles (+1.1 m/s, Yamaguchi 2018) and 8.18 seconds in the 60 metres hurdles (Osaka 2019).

== International competitions ==
Year	Competition	Venue	Position	Event	Notes
Representing Japan
2011	World Youth Championships	Lille, France	18th (sf)	200 m	24.64
2011	World Youth Championships	Lille, France	9th (h)	Medley relay	2:10.54
2014	Asian Games	Incheon, South Korea	9th (h)	100 m hurdles	13.76
2014	Asian Games	Incheon, South Korea	3rd	4 × 100 m relay	44.05
2016	Asian Indoor Championships	Doha, Qatar	5th	100 m hurdles	8.36
2018	Asian Games	Jakarta, Indonesia	5th	100 m hurdles	13.63
2018	Asian Games	Jakarta, Indonesia	5th	4 × 100 m relay	44.93
2019	Asian Championships	Doha, Qatar	3rd	100 m hurdles	13.28
2021	Olympic Games	Tokyo, Japan	37th (h)	100 m hurdles	13.59
2022	World Championships	Eugene, United States	21st (sf)	100 m hurdles	13.04
2022	World Championships	Eugene, United States	12th (h)	4 × 100 m relay	43.33
2023	Asian Indoor Championships	Astana, Kazakhstan	1st	60 m hurdles	8.01
2023	Asian Championships	Bangkok, Thailand	3rd	100 m hurdles	13.26
2023	World Championships	Budapest, Hungary	39th (h)	100 m hurdles	13.26
2023	Asian Games	Hangzhou, China	5th	100 m hurdles	13.34
2024	World Indoor Championships	Glasgow, United Kingdom	27th (h)	60 m hurdles	8.13
