= Athletics at the 2018 Asian Games – Women's 100 metres hurdles =

Women's 100 metres hurdles at the 2018 Asian Games
- Venue: Gelora Bung Karno Stadium
- Date: 25–26 August 2018
- Competitors: 15 from 12 nations

Medalists
gold medal	Jung Hye-lim	South Korea
silver medal	Emilia Nova	Indonesia
bronze medal	Lui Lai Yiu	Hong Kong

The women's 100 metres hurdles competition at the 2018 Asian Games took place on 25 and 26 August 2018 at the Gelora Bung Karno Stadium.

== Schedule ==
All times are Western Indonesia Time (UTC+07:00)

Date	Time	Event
Saturday, 25 August 2018	21:05	Round 1
Sunday, 26 August 2018	20:10	Final

== Records ==
Prior to this competition, the existing world, Asian and Games records were as follows.

World Record	Kendra Harrison (USA)	12.20	London, United Kingdom	22 July 2016
Asian Record	Olga Shishigina (KAZ)	12.44	Lucerne, Switzerland	27 June 1995
Games Record	Olga Shishigina (KAZ)	12.63	Bangkok, Thailand	19 December 1998

== Results ==
Legend

- DSQ — Disqualified

=== Round 1 ===
- Qualification: First 2 in each heat (Q) and the next 2 fastest (q) advance to the final.

==== Heat 1 ====
- Wind: +0.4 m/s

Rank	Athlete	Time	Notes
1	Emilia Nova (INA)	13.43	Q
2	Masumi Aoki (JPN)	13.48	Q
3	Lui Lai Yiu (HKG)	13.52	q
4	Dlsoz Obed (IRQ)	14.90	
—	Aigerim Shynazbekova (KAZ)	DSQ	

==== Heat 2 ====
- Wind: +0.8 m/s

Rank	Athlete	Time	Notes
1	Jung Hye-lim (KOR)	13.17	Q
2	Wang Dou (CHN)	13.58	Q
3	Hsieh Hsi-en (TPE)	13.75	q
4	Shing Cho Yan (HKG)	14.48	
5	Maria Maratab (PAK)	15.72	

==== Heat 3 ====
- Wind: −0.7 m/s

Rank	Athlete	Time	Notes
1	Anastassiya Vinogradova (KAZ)	13.74	Q
2	Hitomi Shimura (JPN)	13.87	Q
3	Suchada Meesri (THA)	14.06	
4	Trần Thị Yến Hoa (VIE)	14.10	
5	Nur Izlyn Zaini (SGP)	14.53	

=== Final ===
- Wind: +0.2 m/s

Rank	Athlete	Time	Notes
1st place, gold medalist(s)	Jung Hye-lim (KOR)	13.20	
2nd place, silver medalist(s)	Emilia Nova (INA)	13.33	
3rd place, bronze medalist(s)	Lui Lai Yiu (HKG)	13.42	
4	Wang Dou (CHN)	13.50	
5	Masumi Aoki (JPN)	13.63	
6	Anastassiya Vinogradova (KAZ)	13.64	
7	Hitomi Shimura (JPN)	13.74	
8	Hsieh Hsi-en (TPE)	13.92	
