= Chen Jiamin =

Chinese hurdler

Medal record

Women's athletics

Representing China

Asian Indoor Championships
Bronze medal – third place	2023 Astana	60 m hurdles

Chen Jiamin (Chinese: 陳佳敏, born 1 May 1996 in Henan) is a Chinese hurdler specialising in the 100m hurdles. She won the silver medal at the 2019 Asian Athletics Championships – Women's 100 metres hurdles and qualified for the 2020 Tokyo Olympics. She was second at the National Championships in 2021.
