= Lui Lai Yiu =

Hong Kong hurdler

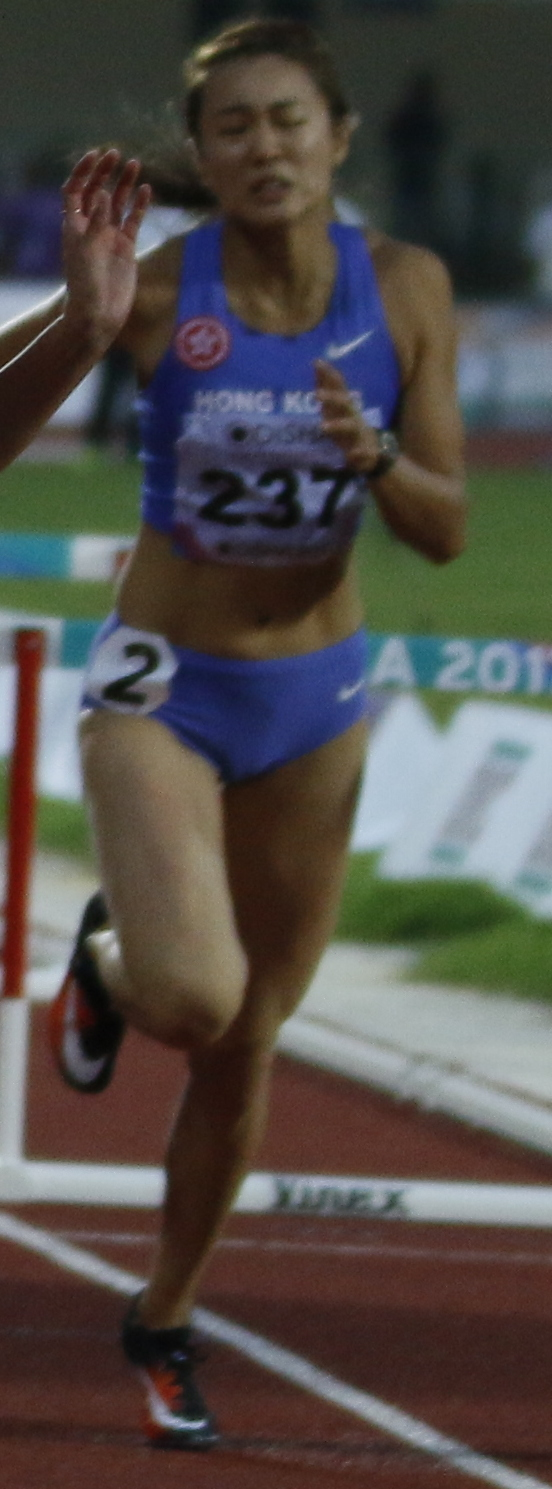
- Lui Lai Yiu in 2017

Personal information
- Born: 30 November 1994 (age 31) Hong Kong
- Height: 1.77 m (5 ft 10 in)
- Weight: 62 kg (137 lb)

Sport
- Sport: Athletics
- Event: 100 m hurdles
Medal record
Women's athletics
Representing Hong Kong
Asian Indoor Championships
Bronze medal – third place	2024 Tehran	60 m hurdles

Lui Lai Yiu (born 30 November 1994) is an athlete from Hong Kong specialising in the sprint hurdles. She won a bronze medal at the 2018 Asian Games. She also won a gold medal at the 2017 Asian Indoor and Martial Arts Games.

Her personal bests are 13.32 seconds in the 100 metres hurdles (+1.3 m/s, Doha 2019) and 8.41 seconds in the 60 metres hurdles (Ashgabat 2017).

== International competitions ==
Year	Competition	Venue	Position	Event	Notes
Representing Hong Kong
2010	Asian Junior Championships	Hanoi, Vietnam	6th	100 m hurdles	17.31
2012	Asian Junior Championships	Colombo, Sri Lanka	3rd	100 m hurdles	14.59
2013	East Asian Games	Tianjin, China	5th	100 m hurdles	14.07
2013	East Asian Games	Tianjin, China	3rd	4 × 400 m relay	4:00.05
2014	Asian Indoor Championships	Hangzhou, China	4th	60 m hurdles	8.76
2014	Asian Games	Incheon, South Korea	11th (h)	100 m hurdles	13.99
2014	Asian Games	Incheon, South Korea	8th	4 × 100 m relay	46.14
2015	Asian Championships	Wuhan, China	10th (h)	100 m hurdles	14.05
2015	Universiade	Gwangju, South Korea	19th (h)	100 m hurdles	14.29
2016	Asian Indoor Championships	Doha, Qatar	–	60 m hurdles	DQ
2017	Asian Championships	Bhubaneswar, India	7th	100 m hurdles	13.89
2017	Universiade	Taipei, Taiwan	19th (h)	100 m hurdles	14.07
2017	Asian Indoor and Martial Arts Games	Ashgabat, Turkmenistan	1st	60 m hurdles	8.41
2018	Asian Games	Jakarta, Indonesia	3rd	100 m hurdles	13.42
2019	Asian Championships	Doha, Qatar	4th	100 m hurdles	13.32
2019	Universiade	Naples, Italy	10th (sf)	100 m hurdles	13.52
2022	World Indoor Championships	Belgrade, Serbia	40th (h)	60 m hurdles	8.45
2023	Asian Championships	Bangkok, Thailand	6th	100 m hurdles	13.65
2023	Asian Games	Hangzhou, China	6th	100 m hurdles	13.35
2024	Asian Indoor Championships	Tehran, Iran	3rd	60 m hurdles	8.26
2025	Asian Championships	Gumi, South Korea	8th	100 m hurdles	13.73
2025	World Championships	Tokyo, Japan	39th (h)	100 m hurdles	13.43
