= Hsieh Hsi-en =

Taiwanese hurdler (born 1994)

Personal information
- Nationality: Taiwanese
- Born: 29 September 1994 (age 31)

Sport
- Sport: Athletics
- Event(s): 100 metres, 100 metres hurdles

Hsieh Hsi-en 謝喜恩 (born 29 September 1994) is a Taiwanese athlete from Yuli, Hualien.

She reached the semifinals at the Athletics at the Athletics at the 2017 Summer Universiade – Women's 100 metres hurdles but didn't make it through the heats at Athletics at the 2019 Summer Universiade – Women's 100 metres hurdles.

She was sixth at the 2019 Asian Athletics Championships – Women's 100 metres hurdles, eighth at the Athletics at the 2018 Asian Games – Women's 100 metres hurdles and represented Chinese Taipei at the 2020 Summer Olympics in the 2020 Olympics Women's 100 metres, for which the country received a Universality place.

She is a student at National Taiwan Normal University.
