= Emelia Chatfield =

Haitian athlete

Personal information
- Nationality: Haitian
- Born: 23 November 2001 (age 24)

Sport
- Sport: Athletics
- Events: Sprint, Hurdles

Achievements and titles
- Personal bests: 100m: 11.96 (Austin, 2023); 100m hurdles 12.72 (Fayetteville, 2024)

Emelia Chatfield (born 23 November 2001) is a Haitian-American hurdler and sprinter. She competed for Haiti at the 2024 Paris Olympics in the 100 metres hurdles.

== Early life ==
She was born in Miami where she attended St. Thomas Aquinas High School before attending the University of Texas at Austin.

== Career ==
=== Collegiate ===
She won the Florida high school state championship over 300 metres in 2018, as well as winning the Florida Relays sprint hurdles and placed third at Brooks PR in the 100m hurdles. She ran a 100m hurdles time of 13.52 to earn a fourth-place finish at the USA Track and Field U20 Championships in 2019. She finished the 2019 season with a personal best of 41.15 seconds in the 300-meter hurdles to rank as the US No. 5 for her age-group and committed to run for the Texas Longhorns. She finished third in the Big 12 indoor championships 60m hurdles in Lubbock, Texas in 2022.

=== Senior ===
She was selected to compete for Haiti in the 100 metres hurdles at the 2024 Paris Olympics. Competing at the Games, she ran a time of 13.24 seconds in the repechage round on 8 August 2024. This came after she ran a time of 13.06 seconds in her qualifying heat on the previous day.

== Personal life ==
Although born in the United States, Chatfield is qualified to run for Haiti through her family heritage. Her grandfather Anelus Arre lived in Beauvois, Jean-Rabel, in the Northwestern Department before moving his family to Miami when her mother, Ketelie Chatfield, was 12 years old. Her father is American. She was one of the athletes at the 2024 Paris Olympics who criticised the conditions on social media. She was reported to give the dining hall food a "0 out of 10", calling it “disgusting.”
