= Emily Britton =

Australian athlete

Personal information
- Nationality: Australian

Sport
- Sport: Athletics
- Event: 100 metres hurdles

Achievements and titles
- Personal best: 100m hurdles 12.95 (2026)
Medal record
Women's athletics
Representing Australia
Oceania Championships
Silver medal – second place	2026 Darwin	100m hurdles

Emily Britton is an Australian high hurdler.

== Biography ==
From Cherrybrook in Northern Sydney, Britton was New South Wales age-group champion in the 100 metres hurdles from 2016 to 2019, and won the Australian age-group national title in 2016. Britton placed third over 100 m hurdles at the 2018 Australian Junior Championships.

In 2023, ran a personal best tune of 13.29 seconds to finish third at the Maurie Plant Meet in Melbourne in February, and took another 0.11 of a second from that best in while winning her heat at 13.18 seconds, and then a further 0.09 to run 13.09 to places second overall at the NSW Open Track and Field Championship in March. She finished fourth at the 2023 Australian Championships in Brisbane in April. She was selected to represent Australia at the 2023 Summer World University Games in Chengdu, China, reaching the semi-finals of the 100 m hurdles.

Britton ran a 13.06 personal best in January 2026 at the ACT Championships in Canberra. In March, she placed second in the 100 metres hurdles to Delta Amidzovski at the NSW State Championships. Competing at the 2026 Maurie Plant Meet in Melbourne later that month, she was runner-up in the 100 metres hurdles to Michelle Jenneke in 13.07 seconds. She was runner-up to Jenneke again on 12 April at the 2026 Australian Championships in Sydney, and broke 13-seconds for the first time, running 12.95 seconds (+1.3). She was selected for the 100 metres hurdles as part of the Australian team to compete at the 2026 Oceania Athletics Championships in Darwin, Northern Territory, winning the silver medal behind Michelle Jenneke.

== Personal life ==
Britton attended Australian Catholic University.
