= Emilia Nova =

Indonesian hurdler (born 1995)

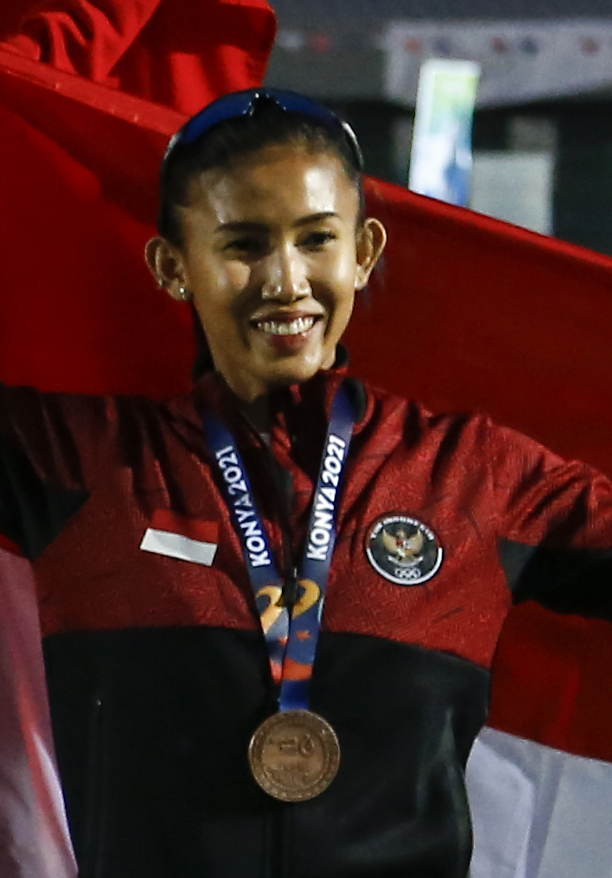

Personal information
- Born: 20 August 1995 (age 31) Jakarta, Indonesia

Sport
- Country: Indonesia
- Sport: Track and field
Medal record
Women's athletics
Representing Indonesia
Asian Games
Silver medal – second place	2018 Jakarta-Palembang	100 m hurdles
Islamic Solidarity Games
Bronze medal – third place	2021 Konya	100 m hurdles
SEA Games
Gold medal – first place	2019 Philippines	100 m hurdles
Gold medal – first place	2025 Thailand	Heptathlon
Silver medal – second place	2017 Kuala Lumpur	Heptathlon
Silver medal – second place	2021 Vietnam	100 m hurdles
Silver medal – second place	2025 Thailand	100 m hurdles
ASEAN University Games
Gold medal – first place	2016 Singapore	100 m hurdles
Gold medal – first place	2018 Naypyidaw	100 m hurdles
Silver medal – second place	2016 Singapore	4x100 m relay

Emilia Nova (born 20 August 1995) is an Indonesian athlete competing in hurdling. She won the silver medal in the women's 100 metres hurdles event at the 2018 Asian Games held in Jakarta, Indonesia.

== Career ==
At the 2019 SEA Games held in the Philippines, she won the gold medal in the women's 100 metres hurdles event. Two years earlier, at the 2017 SEA Games held in Kuala Lumpur, Malaysia, she won the silver medal in the heptathlon event.

In 2019, she competed in the women's 100 metres hurdles event at the Asian Athletics Championships held in Doha, Qatar where she failed to qualify to compete in the final. Later that year, she also competed in the women's 100 metres hurdles at the 2019 Summer Universiade held in Naples, Italy. Here she failed to qualify to compete in the semifinals.

In the 2025 SEA Games, Emilia won the gold medal in the heptathlon event and a silver medal in the 100 meters hurdles.

== Competition record ==
Year	Competition	Venue	Position	Event	Notes
Representing Indonesia
2017	Southeast Asian Games	Kuala Lumpur, Malaysia	2nd	Heptathlon	5386 pts
2018	Asian Games	Jakarta, Indonesia	2nd	100 m hurdles	13.33
2019	Asian Championships	Doha, Qatar	10th (h)	100 m hurdles	13.70
2019	Summer Universiade	Naples, Italy	21st (h)	100 m hurdles	14.19
2019	SEA Games	Philippines	1st	100 m hurdles	13.61
2022	Islamic Solidarity Games	Konya, Turkey	3rd	100 m hurdles	13.59
