= Pierre-Quinon Metropolitan Stadium =

Indoor sports arean in Nantes, France

Stadium Métropolitain Pierre-Quinon
- Location within France
- Address: Boulevard Guy Mollet, Nantes, France
- Coordinates: 47.248°N 1.555°W
- Owner: Nantes Métropole
- Capacity: 532 seats

Construction
- Built: 8 December 2011-2013
- Architect: Jean Guervilly

Website
- www.nantes.fr/stadium-pierre-quinon

The Pierre Quinon Metropolitan stadium is an indoor arena located in Nantes, France, in the Nantes Nord district.

== Location ==
The stadium is located in the northern districts of Nantes, near the Petit Port racecourse and the rugby stadium of the same name, at the corner of Guy Mollet Blvd. and of Fresh rue du-Blanc.

== History ==
In the early 2000s, the need for Nantes high level athletes to be able to train without suffering the vagaries of weather arose. Until then Nantes athletes had to go to Bordeaux, Caen or Clermont-Ferrand to find equipment that met their expectations. It was decided to give the Nantes area a covered stadium dedicated primarily to the practice of indoor athletics, but also badminton, basketball, handball, and volleyball, etc. And this indoor stadium also occasionally hosts university exams. It is currently the only enclosure of this type in the city of Nantes and the "Grand Ouest ".

The indoor stadium is on a field of 10,000m^{2}, located in the northern districts, at the heart of the university center, close to the SUAPS (University Department of Physical and Sports Activities). The architect appointed to complete the project was Jean Guervilly. On 8 December 2011 the first stone was laid in the presence of Jean-Marc Ayrault, then mayor of Nantes. The building was finished in the summer 2013 after 18 months of work that cost EUR 21.150 million (funded by Nantes Métropole for €9 million, the Region Pays de la Loire for €3.5 million, the General Council for €3.5 million, the University Nantes to €2.7 million, and the State for €2.45 million).

On 24 June 2013 the Community Council of the Nantes Métropole named the stadium after Pierre Quinon, pole vault Olympic champion at the 1984 Los Angeles Games who had died suddenly in 2011 at the age of 49.

By consequence of the transformation of the urban community in metropolis, the stadium becomes a metropolitan enclosure on 1 January 2015.

== Characteristics ==
The building has a 200m track held within a large hall of 4,539m^{2} space (called the Fernand Lancereau Room in honor of the former President of the Loire-Atlantique Athletics Committee 1986-1998 and creator of "Foulées du tram"). Next to the track are placed bleachers (532 seats). Behind these items is an additional room of 2,175m^{2}, named the Alice Milliat Hall after a Nantes sports lady, who was a swimmer, hockey player and rower, and who was committed to the recognition of women's sport. This room is for various sports (athletics, badminton, basketball, handball). The building makes its own energy, a positive energy building. The roof is covered by 4,000 m^{2} photovoltaic cells.

== Access ==
The site is accessible by public transport routes:

- Bus route 75, stop "Guy Mollet"
- Tram line 2, bus lines 25 & 80, stop "Facultés ou École Centrale - Audencia"
