= Masai Russell =

American sprinter and hurdler (born 2000)

Masai Russell OLY
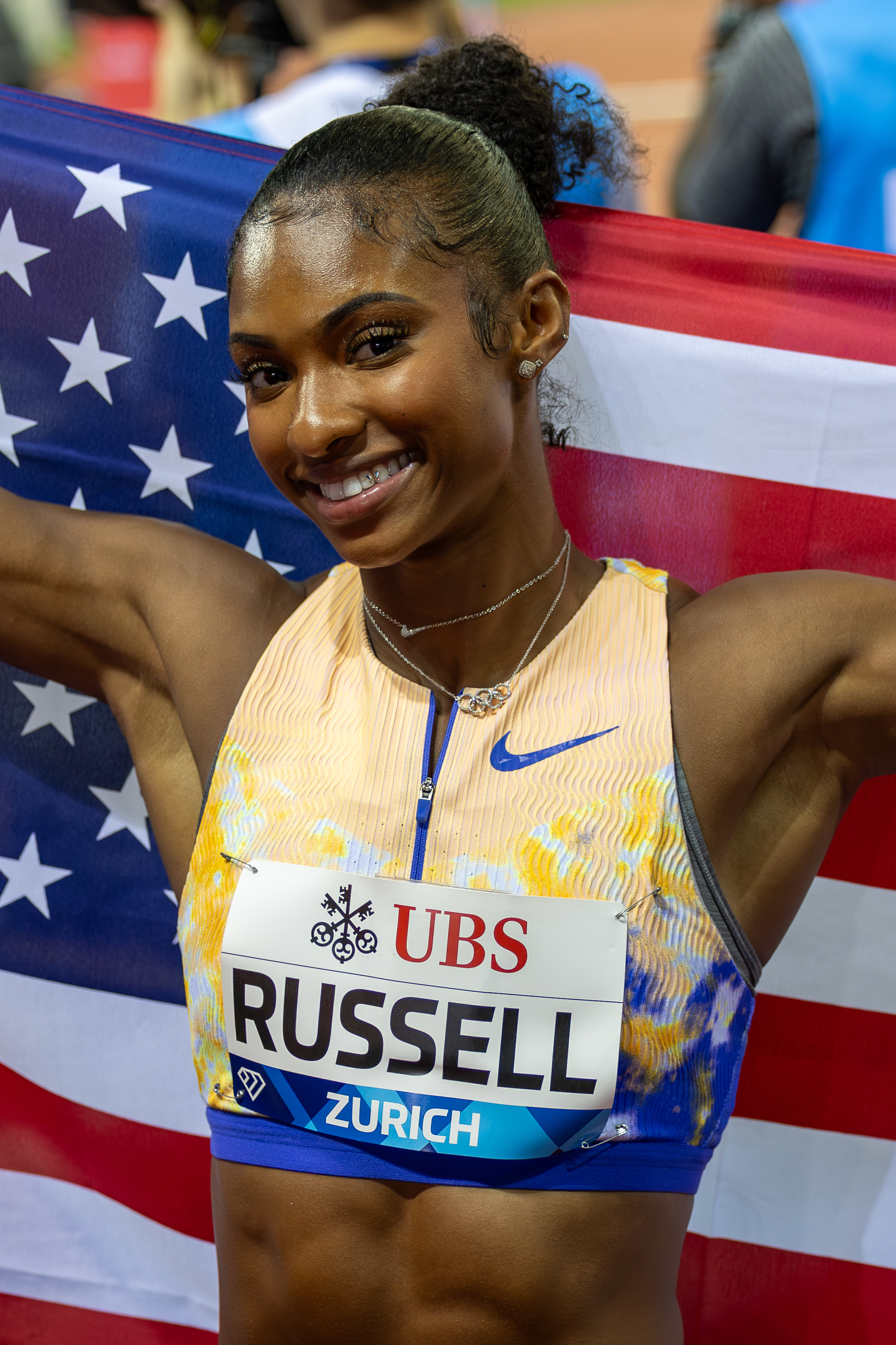
- Russell at the 2026 Weltklasse Zürich

Personal information
- Born: June 17, 2000 (age 26) Washington, D.C., U.S.
- Height: 5 ft 4 in (163 cm)

Sport
- Country: United States
- Sport: Athletics/Track
- Events: 100 meters hurdles, 400 meters hurdles, 60 metres hurdles
- College team: Kentucky Wildcats (2021–2023)
- Team: Nike
- Turned pro: June 2023
- Coached by: Lonnie Greene

Achievements and titles
- Olympic finals: 2024 Paris; 100 mH, Gold
- Personal bests: 100 mH: 12.09 (Zurich 2026) WR; 400 mH: 54.66 (Austin 2023); 60 mH: 7.74i (New York City 2025)
Medal record
Women's athletics
Representing the United States
Olympic Games
Gold medal – first place	2024 Paris	100 m hurdles
World Ultimate Championship
First place	2026 Budapest	100 m hurdles
Diamond League
First place	2026 Brussels	100 m hurdles

Masai Russell (/məˈsaɪ/ mə-SY; born June 17, 2000) is an American track and field sprinter and hurdler. She won the gold medal at the 2024 Summer Olympics in the 100 m hurdles event. Russell is the world record holder in the 100 m hurdles, running a time of 12.09 seconds on August 27, 2026.

In addition to her world record, Russell holds personal bests of 7.74 seconds over the 60-meter hurdles, which is tied for thirteenth-fastest of all time, and 54.66 seconds over the 400-meter hurdles.

== Career ==
In 2021, Russell ran her first sub-13s 100 m hurdles in placing second in her heat at the SEC Championships. She went on to place sixth in the final. Later that year, Russell ran 12.93s to make the final of the NCAA Division I Championships, where she finished sixth. She also placed fourth in the 400 meter hurdles with a time of 56.18s, a personal best at the time.

At the 2022 NCAA Division I Outdoor Championships, Russell placed third in the 100 m hurdles and fourth in the 400 m hurdles.

In 2023, Russell broke the collegiate record for the 60 m hurdles, running 7.75s to beat Grace Stark's time of 7.78s set the year before. In April, she ran a collegiate/NCAA record of 12.36s over 100 m hurdles at the Texas Relays. In June, she placed second in both the 100 m hurdles and 400 m hurdles at the 2023 NCAA Division I Outdoor Championships. After the conclusion of the 2023 NCAA season, Russell turned professional. At the 2023 USA Outdoor Championships, Russell finished third qualifying to represent the United States at the World Championships in Budapest. She made the semi-finals, but did not finish there after hitting a hurdle.

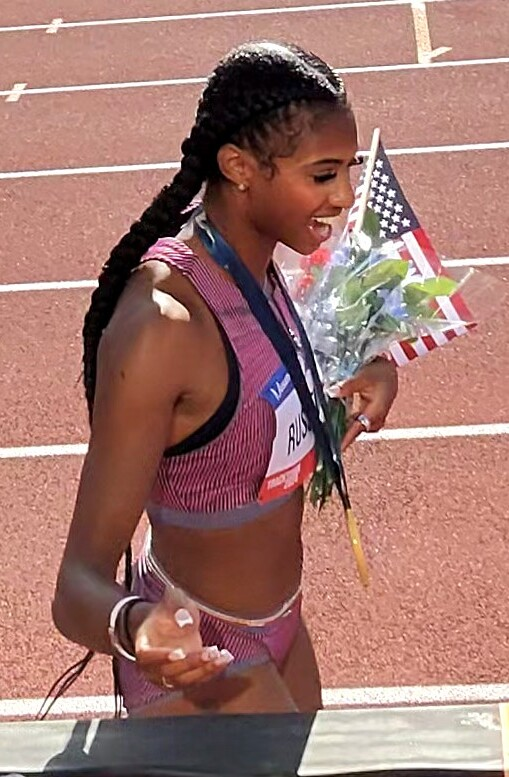
Russell at the 2024 United States Olympic trials

Russell finished fourth in the 60 m hurdles at the 2024 World Indoor Championships. In April 2024, she signed a sponsorship deal with Nike after previously being signed with Gymshark. She placed first at the 2024 U.S. Olympic Trials in the 100 m hurdles in a personal best time of 12.25 to qualify her for the 2024 Summer Olympics in Paris. At the Olympics, Russell won gold with a time of 12.33s, narrowly beating Cyréna Samba-Mayela. In September 2024, it was announced that Russell had signed up for the inaugural season of the Michael Johnson-founded Grand Slam Track. She ended her 2024 season by finishing third at the inaugural Athlos meet.

On May 2, 2025, she ran the 100-meter hurdles in a time of 12.17 seconds, an American record, at the 2025 Miami Grand Slam meet. On July 5, she ran to fourth place at the 2025 Prefontaine Classic. On August 2, she competed in the 2025 USA Outdoor Track and Field Championships and won the gold medal with a time of 12.22 seconds. At the 2025 World Athletics Championships, Russell won both her heat and semi-final race but only finished fourth in the final. She ended the season with winning the 2025 Athlos meet for the 100 m hurdles with a wind-assisted 12.52 seconds.

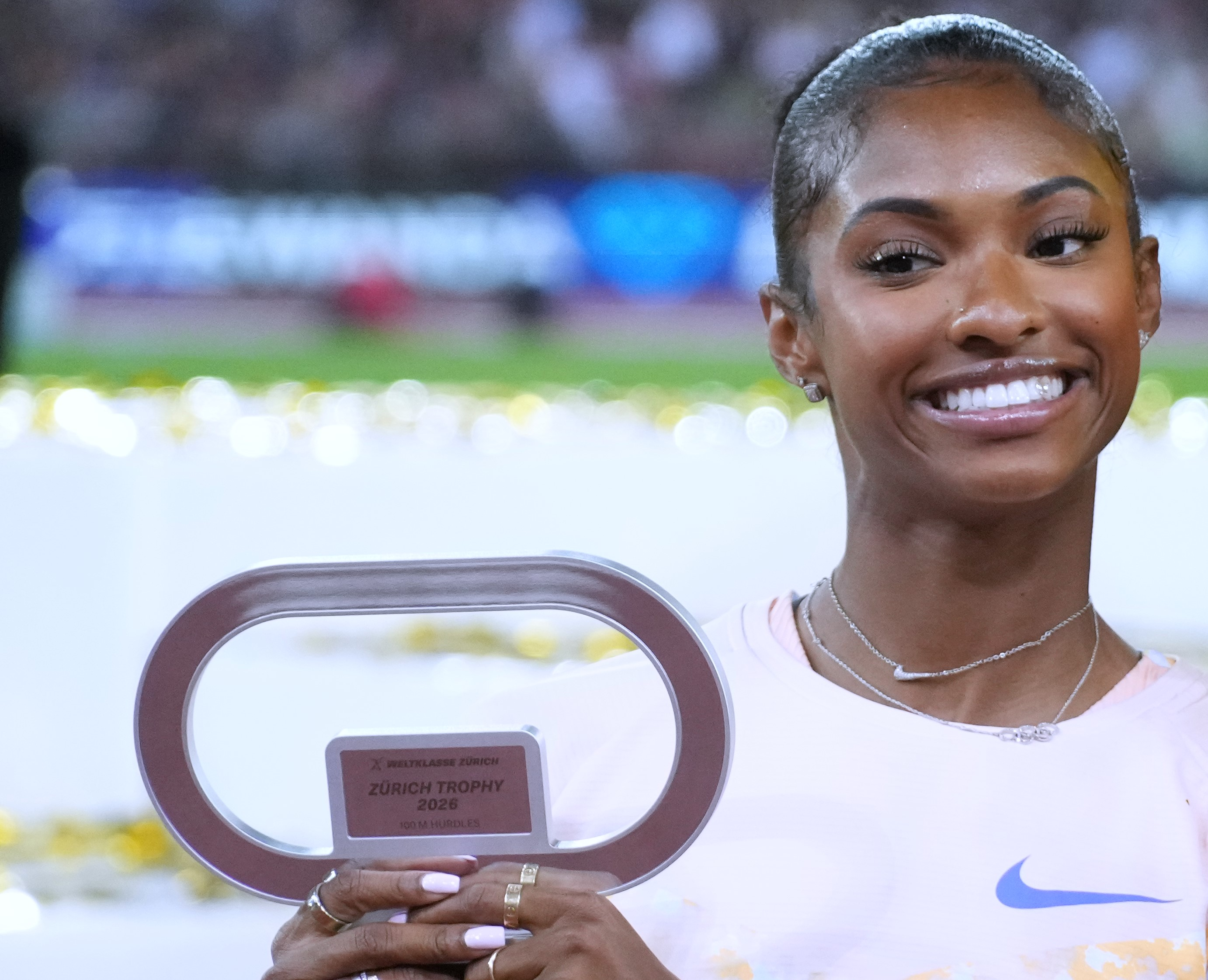
Russell after breaking the 100 metres hurdles world record at the 2026 Weltklasse Zürich

In May 2026, Russell further improved on her personal best to 12.14 seconds after winning the event at the Xiamen Diamond League. On June 24, 2026, Russell competed in the Los Angeles Grand Prix in the 100 meter hurdles and won with a time of 12.26 seconds. On July 4, she won the same event at the 2026 Prefontaine Classic with a time of 12.24, equaling a meet record.

On August 27, 2026, Russell won the 100 m hurdles in the 2026 Zürich Diamond League with a world record time of 12.09 seconds, one of two world records set at that meet. This broke the previous record time of 12.12s by Tobi Amusan back in 2022. The victory marked her 11th consecutive win in the event. Reflecting on her performance, Russell suggested that a stronger tailwind could have pushed her under the 12-second barrier. "If we get a 1.9 wind behind my back, that could have been a sub-12 race," she noted, adding, "Everything that I’ve said that I wanted to do has come into fruition, so why not say I think I can be the first one to run sub-12?"

Russell ended her season in September, first by winning her first Diamond League Final in Brussels in 12.20 seconds, and later by winning the inaugural World Ultimate Championship in Budapest in 12.22 seconds. She ended her 2026 season with nine of the ten fastest times in the 100 m hurdles during the season and ran under 12.30 seconds nine times, remaining unbeaten in the event all year. For her efforts, she was one of the 10 female athletes nominated for World Athlete of the Year.

== Education ==
Russell graduated from Bullis School in 2018. She graduated from the University of Kentucky with a degree in Health Science in 2023.

== Competition results ==
Information taken from World Athletics profile unless otherwise noted.

=== Circuit performances ===
Grand Slam Track results
Slam	Race group	Event	Pl.	Time	Prize money
2025 Kingston Slam	Short hurdles	100 m hurdles	5th	12.78	US$15,000
2025 Kingston Slam	Short hurdles	100 m	5th	11.86	US$15,000
2025 Miami Slam	Short hurdles	100 m hurdles	1st	12.17	US$50,000
2025 Miami Slam	Short hurdles	100 m	4th	11.40	US$50,000

=== National championships ===
Year	Competition	Venue	Position	Event	Time	Notes
2021	US Olympic Trials	Eugene, Oregon	6th (sf)	400 Meters Hurdles	58.00	
2022	USA Outdoor Track and Field Championships	Eugene, Oregon	6th	400 Meters Hurdles	55.66	
2023	USA Outdoor Track and Field Championships	Eugene, Oregon	3rd	100 Meters Hurdles	12.46	
2024	USA Indoor Track and Field Championships	Albuquerque, New Mexico	3rd	60 Meters Hurdles	7.80	
2024	US Olympic Trials	Eugene, Oregon	1st	100 Meters Hurdles	12.25	
2025	USA Indoor Track and Field Championships	New York, New York	1st	60 Meters Hurdles	7.74	
2025	USA Outdoor Track and Field Championships	Eugene, Oregon	1st	100 Meters Hurdles	12.22	

=== International competition ===
Representing the United States
Year	Competition	Venue	Position	Event	Time	Notes
2017	Pan American U20 Championships	Trujillo, Peru	3rd	400 m hurdles	57.55	
2023	World Championships	Budapest, Hungary	9th (h)	100 m hurdles	12.60^{1}	
2024	World Indoor Championships	Glasgow, United Kingdom	4th	60 m hurdles	7.81	
2024	Olympic Games	Paris, France	1st	100 m hurdles	12.33	
2025	World Championships	Tokyo, Japan	4th	100 m hurdles	12.44	
2026	World Ultimate Championship	Budapest, Hungary	1st	100 m hurdles	12.22	

^{1}DNF in the semi-finals.

View chart definition.

== Awards ==
- Night of Legends Award 2024: Breakthrough Performer Wing Award

Records
Preceded by (Nigeria) Tobi Amusan	Women's 100 m hurdles world record holder August 27, 2026 – present	Succeeded by Incumbent
