= Hitomi Nakajima =

Japanese hurdler (born 1995)

Personal information
- Nationality: Japanese
- Born: 13 July 1995 (age 31)

Sport
- Sport: Athletics
- Event: Hurdles

Achievements and titles
- Personal bests: 60 m hurdles: 8.15 (Osaka, 2025); 100 m hurdles: 12.71 (Tampere, 2023)
Medal record
Women's athletics
Representing Japan
Asian Games
Silver medal – second place	2026 Aichi–Nagoya	110 m hurdles
Asian Indoor Championships
Bronze medal – third place	2026 Tanjijn	60 m hurdles

Hitomi Nakajima (born 13 July 1995) is a Japanese sprint hurdler. She was runner-up in the 100 metres hurdles at 2026 Asian Games and won the bronze medal in the 60 metres hurdles at the 2026 Asian Indoor Athletics Championships. She was a semi-finalist in the 100 m hurdles at the 2025 World Championships.

== Biography ==
Nakajima attended Shukugawa Gakuin High School in Kobe, and Sonoda Gakuen University in Amagasaki Japan. She started in 100 metres hurdles at high school won the All-Japan Junior High School Championships, the Japan youth championships and the Japanese Games, but had a period of not competing due to a stress related illness, prior to returning to the sport and placing fourth at the Japanese Athletics Championships in 2022. She ran below 13 seconds for the 100 m hurdles for the first time in September 2024.

In July 2025, she was runner-up to Yumi Tanaka at the 2025 Japanese Athletics Championships, running 12.86 seconds in the final. That month, she ran a personal best of 12.71 seconds at the Motonet GP Tampere in Tampere, Finland to finish ahead of an international-class field including local athlete Lotta Harala, as well as Maayke Tjin-A-Lim of the Netherlands and Australian Michelle Jenneke. She met the automatic standard for the upcoming world championships and was subsequently named in the Japanese team for the 2025 World Athletics Championships in Tokyo, Japan, and spoke of her pride at representing Japan at the team unveiling. On 15 September, she was a semi-finalist at the women's 100 metres hurdles, having run 12.88 seconds to place fifth in her heat won by Tobi Amusan to proceed as a time qualifier, before placing seventh in her semi-final in a time of 13.02.

In February 2026, she won the bronze medal in the 60 metres hurdles at the 2026 Asian Indoor Athletics Championships in Tianjin, China. In September, she won the silver medal in the 100 metres hurdles final at the 2026 Asian Games in Nagoya, rubbing 12.78 seconds despite wet weather conditions.
