= Janeek Brown =

Jamaican sprinter (born 1998)

Personal information
- Native name: Janeek Brown
- Nationality: Jamaican
- Born: 14 May 1998 (age 28)
- Home town: Kingston, Jamaica
- Education: Wolmer's High School for Girls
- Height: 5 ft 5 in (165 cm)

Sport
- Sport: Track and field
- Events: 100-meter hurdles 200 meters
- College team: University of Arkansas
- Turned pro: 2019

Achievements and titles
- World finals: 2019; 7th
Medal record
Representing Jamaica
Carifta Games Junior (U20)
Silver medal – second place	2017 Willemstad	100 m hurdles
Carifta Games Youth (U18)
Gold medal – first place	2015 Basse-Terre	100 m hurdles
Gold medal – first place	2015 Basse-Terre	4×100 m relay

Janeek Brown (born 14 May 1998) is a Jamaican athlete who specializes in the 100m hurdles. Her personal best is in that event is 12.40s. She set the mark while winning the 2019 NCAA Championships, running for the University of Arkansas as a sophomore.

== Biography ==
Brown tied for the second fastest in NCAA history, close to Brianna Rollins' 12.39. It also became the pending Jamaican record, though it will not be ratified because Danielle Williams superseded it with a 12.32 run later in the season during the Diamond League. That same day she ran a Razorbacks school record of 22.40 in the 200 metres. The two marks combined 34.80 beat the world record for same day performance previously held by Jackie Joyner-Kersee, from her world record heptathlon at the 1988 Olympics.

== NCAA ==
Brown is the Arkansas Razorbacks track and field and Southeastern Conference 100 meter hurdles all-time record setter. In 2019, as a sophomore, Brown earned her fifth NCAA Division I All-American track and field award.

== Professional ==
She had previously represented Jamaica at the 2014 Summer Youth Olympics. Based on the hurdle mark, she qualified to represent Jamaica at the 2019 World Championships, qualifying for the final. She ultimately finished in seventh place.

In July 2019, Brown chose to represent Puma as a title sponsor following a 2019 world leading time.

In July 2024, she was selected for the Jamaican team at the 2024 Paris Olympics.

=== Competition record ===
Year	Competition	Venue	Position	Event	Notes
Representing Jamaica
2019	World Championships	Doha, Qatar	7th	100 m hurdles	12.88
2024	Olympic Games	Paris, France	19th (sf)	100 m hurdles	12.92
