= Imogen Breslin =

Australian athlete (born 2001)

Personal information
- Nationality: Australian
- Born: 20 June 2001 (age 25)

Sport
- Sport: Track and Field
- Event: 100 metres hurdles

Achievements and titles
- Personal best(s): 100m hurdles: 13.31 (Sydney, 2023)
Medal record
Pacific Games
Gold medal – first place	2023 Honiara	100m hurdles

Imogen Breslin (born 20 June 2001) is an Australian track and field athlete who competes over 100m hurdles. In December 2023, she won gold at the 2023 Pacific Games in Honiara.

== Career ==
Coached by Mick Zisti since her early teens, Breslin is from New South Wales. In March 2023 at the NSW Games in Sydney, Breslin set a new personal best for the 100m hurdles of 13.31 seconds.

A student at Macquarie University, in May 2023 Breslin was selected to compete at the 2023 Summer World University Games in Chengdu.

In December 2023, she became Oceanic champion at the 2023 Pacific Games in Honiara, running 13.81 seconds.
