= Remi Tsuruta =

Japanese sprinter (born 1997)

Personal information
- Nationality: Japanese
- Born: 18 April 1997 (age 28) Kagoshima City, Kagoshima Prefecture, Japan

Sport
- Sport: Athletics
- Event: 100 metres

Remi Tsuruta (鶴田 玲美, born 18 April 1997) is a Japanese athlete. She competed in the women's 4 × 100 metres relay event at the 2020 Summer Olympics.
