= Nithya Ramraj =

Indian athlete

Personal information
- Born: September 20, 1998 (age 28) Coimbatore, Tamil Nadu, India

Sport
- Sport: Athletics
- Event: 100 m hurdles

Achievements and titles
- Personal best: 100 m hurdles: 13.04 (31 August 2024)

Nithya Ramraj (born 20 September 1998) is an Indian athlete who competes in 100 metres hurdles. She was part of the Indian contingent for the 2022 Asian Games.

== Early and personal life ==
Nithya Ramraj was born 20 September 1998, and hails from Coimbatore, Tamil Nadu. Her father is a truck driver. She is one of the three daughters to her parents, and has an identical twin, Vithya, who is also an athlete. The twins initially played field hockey at school and took up athletics when they joined the sports school at Erode for Class 7. She is employed by the Income Tax Department.

== Career ==
Nithya focused on 100 and 100 metres hurdles while her elder twin focused on 400 metres and 400 metres hurdles. In August 2019, she placed fourth in the 100 metres hurdles at the National Athletics Championships at Lucknow. In October that year, she won the silver medal in the same event at the 59th National Open Athletics Championships at Ranchi. In March 2021, she won a bronze medal in the 100 metres hurdles in the 24th National Federation Cup Senior Athletic Championships at Patiala.

Since 2021, Nithya and her sister are being trained by Nehpal Singh Rathore at the Jawaharlal Nehru Stadium in Chennai. Both the sisters were part of the Indian contingent for the 2022 Asian Games. At the Asian Games, she finished seventh in the 100 metres hurdles. In the 2023 Asian Athletics Championships, she finished fourth in the 100 metres hurdles event.
