= Lin Yuwei =

Chinese athlete (born 1999)

Lin Yuwei 林雨薇
Personal information
- Born: 2 May 1999 (age 27) Youxi, Fujian, China
- Height: 1.71 m (5 ft 7 in)

Sport
- Country: China
- Sport: Athletics
- Event: 100 metres hurdles

Achievements and titles
- Personal bests: 100m: 11.57 (Shenyang, 2023); 100m hurdles: 12.74 (Hangzhou, 2023)
Medal record
Women's athletics
Representing China
Asian Games
Gold medal – first place	2022 Hangzhou	100m hurdles

Lin Yuwei (born 2 May 1999) is a Chinese track and field athlete who competes in the 100 metres hurdles. In 2023, she won the gold medal for the 100m hurdles event at the 2022 Asian Games, in Hangzhou.

== Career ==
Born in Youxi County, Lin was first selected for the prestigious Fujian Provincial Team in November 2014. She won the 100m and 200m at the Fujian Provincial Games in 2014. She would go on to finish runner-up in the 100 metres hurdles at the 2018 National Youth Championship. She then won the 100m hurdles title at the National University Games in 2019. She won gold at the National Games in 2021, running a personal best time of 12.85 seconds for the 100m hurdles. She won gold in the 60m hurdles championship at the 2023 National Indoor Track and Field Championships. She then had a second-place finish in the 100m hurdles at the National Track and Field Championship in 2023, clocking a time of 12.97 seconds

Lin won gold at the delayed 2022 Asian Games in October 2023, running a time of 12.74 seconds for the 100 metres hurdles.

She finished second to Wu Yanni in the 110m hurdles at the Chinese Athletics Championships in June 2024. She competed in the 100m hurdles at the 2024 Paris Olympics.

== Personal life ==
She attends East China Normal University in Shanghai. Her younger sister Lin Yuxi has also competed in athletics at national level.
