= Huỳnh Thị Mỹ Tiên =

Vietnamese athlete (born 1999)

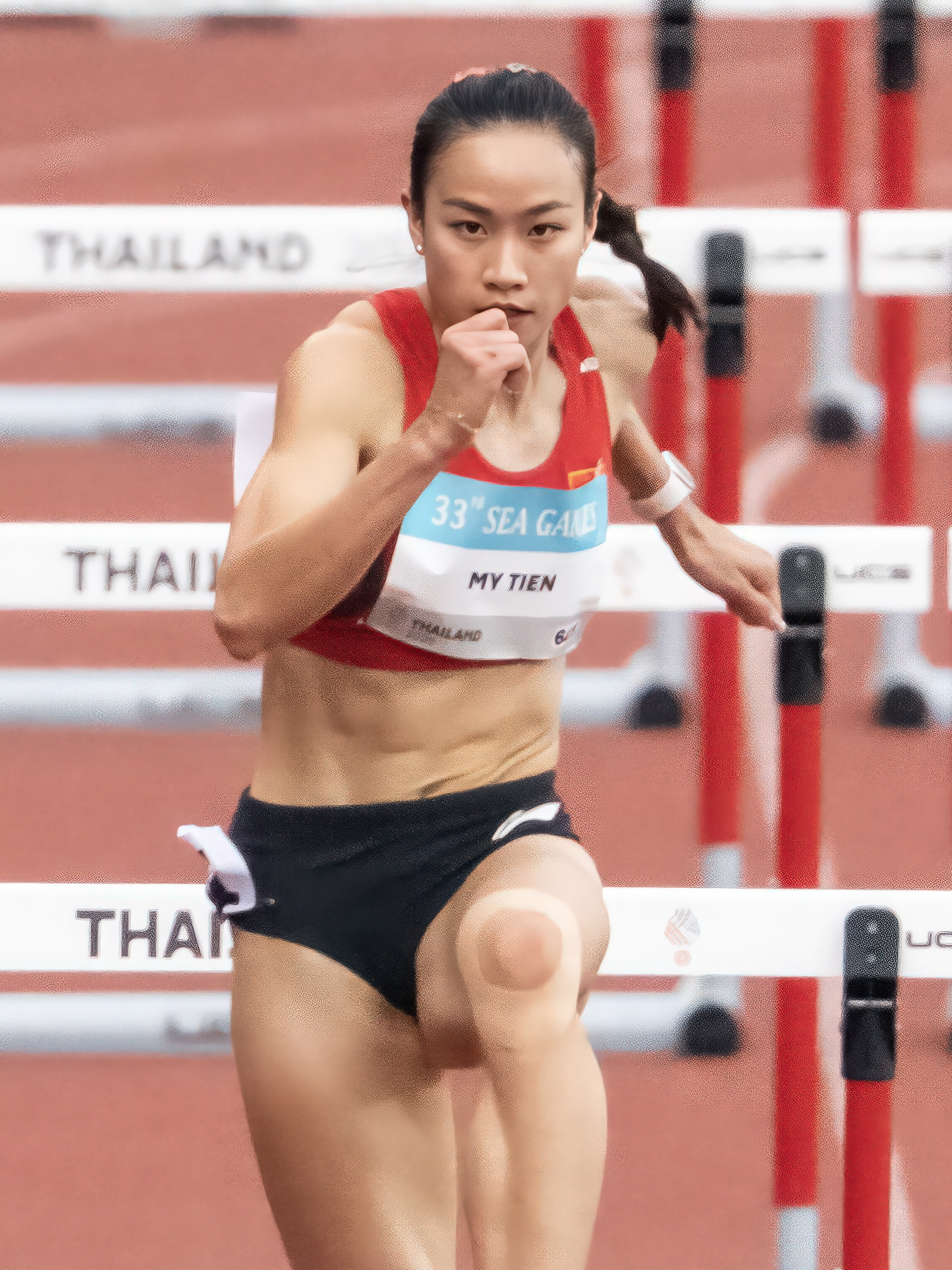
- Mỹ Tiên at the 2025 Southeast Asian Games

Personal information
- Born: 24 March 1999 (age 27)

Sport
- Sport: Athletics
- Event: Hurdles

Achievements and titles
- Personal bests: 100mH: 13.46 (Bangkok, 2023)
Medal record
Women's athletics
Representing Vietnam
SEA Games
Gold medal – first place	2023 Cambodia	100 m hurdles
Silver medal – second place	2023 Cambodia	4x100 m relay
Bronze medal – third place	2025 Thailand	100 m hurdles

Huỳnh Thị Mỹ Tiên (born 24 March 1999) is a Vietnamese hurdler. She won the gold medal at the 2023 Southeast Asian Games in the 100 metres hurdles and competed at the 2025 World Championships.

== Career ==
Mỹ Tiên is from Vinh Long, and became involved in athletics during high school. She won the Vietnamese Athletics Championships in the 100 metres hurdles in 2020 and 2021. In May 2023, she won gold medal the 100 metres hurdles at the 2023 Southeast Asian Games in Phnom Penh, Cambodia in a time of 13.50 seconds. She was also a silver medalist in the 4 x 100 metres relay at the Games.

In July 2023, she ran a personal best of 13.46 seconds to reach the final of the 100 metres hurdles the 2023 Asian Athletics Championships in Bangkok, before placing fifth overall.

At the 2024 Vietnamese Athletics Championship, she ran an all-conditions lifetime best tine of 13.38 seconds, 0.02 seconds behind the national record of 13.36 seconds held by Vũ Bích Hường, set in 1999, who also acts as her coach in Hanoi.

After qualifying for the final, she placed seventh overall in the 100 metres hurdles the 2025 Asian Athletics Championships in Gumi, South Korea in May 2025. She won the 2025 Vietnamese Athletics Championship in Da Nang, running the women's 100m hurdles in a time of 13.52 seconds.

In September, she was the sole Vietnamese female athlete selected to compete at the 2025 World Athletics Championships in Tokyo, Japan. She competed in the women’s 100 metres hurdles, running a time of 13.77 seconds in her heat, without advancing to the semi-finals. In December, she won the 100m hurdles bronze medal at the 2025 SEA Games.
