= Zhang Bo-ya =

Taiwanese hurdler (born 2003)

Personal information
- Born: 3 April 2003 (age 23)

Sport
- Sport: Athletics
- Event: Hurdles

Achievements and titles
- Personal bests: 60m hurdles: 8.07 (2026) NR; 100m hurdles: 13.05 (2025)
Medal record
Women's athletics
Representing Chinese Taipei
Asian Indoor Championships
Gold medal – first place	2026 Tanjijn	60 m hurdles

Zhang Bo-ya (born 3 April 2003) is a Taiwanese sprint hurdler. She won the gold medal at the 2026 Asian Indoor Athletics Championships in the 60 metres hurdles in a national record time. She has represented Chinese Taipei at major championships, including the 2024 Olympic Games and 2025 World Athletics Indoor Championships.

== Biography ==
Zhang was a finalist at the 2023 Asian Athletics Championships in Bangkok, placing seventh overall in the 100 metres hurdles. That year, she placed fourth st the 2023 Asian Games, running 13.31 seconds for the 100 metres hurdles in Hangzhou, China.

Zhang placed third behind former world champion and Olympic silver medallist Nia Ali at the Taiwan Athletics Open 2024. She competed in the 100 metres at the 2024 Summer Olympics in Paris, advancing from the preliminary round without reaching the semi-finals.

Zhang ran a personal best of 8.27 seconds for the 60 metres hurdles at the 2025 World Athletics Indoor Championships in March 2025 in Nanjing. Zhang was a finalist in the 100 metres hurdles at the 2025 Asian Athletics Championships in Gumi, South Korea, placing sixth overall. That summer she competed for Chinese Taipei at the 2025 World University Games in Bochum, Germany, reaching the semi-finals of the 100 metres hurdles.

In February 2026, Zhang won the gold medal in the 60 metres hurdles at the 2026 Asian Indoor Athletics Championships in China, winning ahead of Japanese athletes Chisato Kiyoyama and Hitomi Nakajima in a personal best time and national record of 8.12 seconds. The following month, she lowered her national record to 8.07 seconds competing in Xi'an, China. In March 2026, she competed in the 60 metres hurdles at the 2026 World Athletics Indoor Championships in Toruń, Poland. Competing at the 2026 Asian Games in Nagoya, Japan, she placed fourth in the 100 metres hurdles final.
