= Yumi Tanaka =

Japanese athlete

Personal information
- Born: 15 December 1998 (age 27) Osaka Prefecture, Japan
- Education: Ritsumeikan University

Sport
- Sport: Athletics
- Event: 100 m hurdles
Medal record
Women's Athletics
Representing Japan
Asian Games
Bronze medal – third place	2022 Hangzhou	100 m hurdles

Yumi Tanaka (田中 佑美, Tanaka Yumi; born 15 December 1998) is a Japanese athlete specialising in the sprint hurdles. She represented her country at the 2023 World Championships, at the 2022 Asian Games and at the Paris Olympic Games 2024.

Her personal best in the event is 12.85 seconds (−0.3 m/s) set in Niigata in 2024. This is the currently 2nd best in Japanese history.

== International competitions ==
Year	Competition	Venue	Position	Event	Notes
Representing Japan
2015	World Youth Championships in Athletics	Cali, Colombia	13th (sf)	100 m hurdles	13.64
2023	World Championships	Budapest, Hungary	34th (h)	100 m hurdles	13.12
2023	Asian Games	Hangzhou, China	3rd	100 m hurdles	13.04
2024	Olympic Games	Paris, France	18th (sf)	100 m hurdles	12.91
2025	World Indoor Championships	Nanjing, China	10th (sf)	60 m hurdles	8.03
2025	Asian Championships	Gumi, South Korea	2nd	100 m hurdles	13.07
2025	World Championships	Tokyo, Japan	30th (h)	100 m hurdles	13.05
