= Maribel Caicedo =

Ecuadorian sprinter (born 1998)

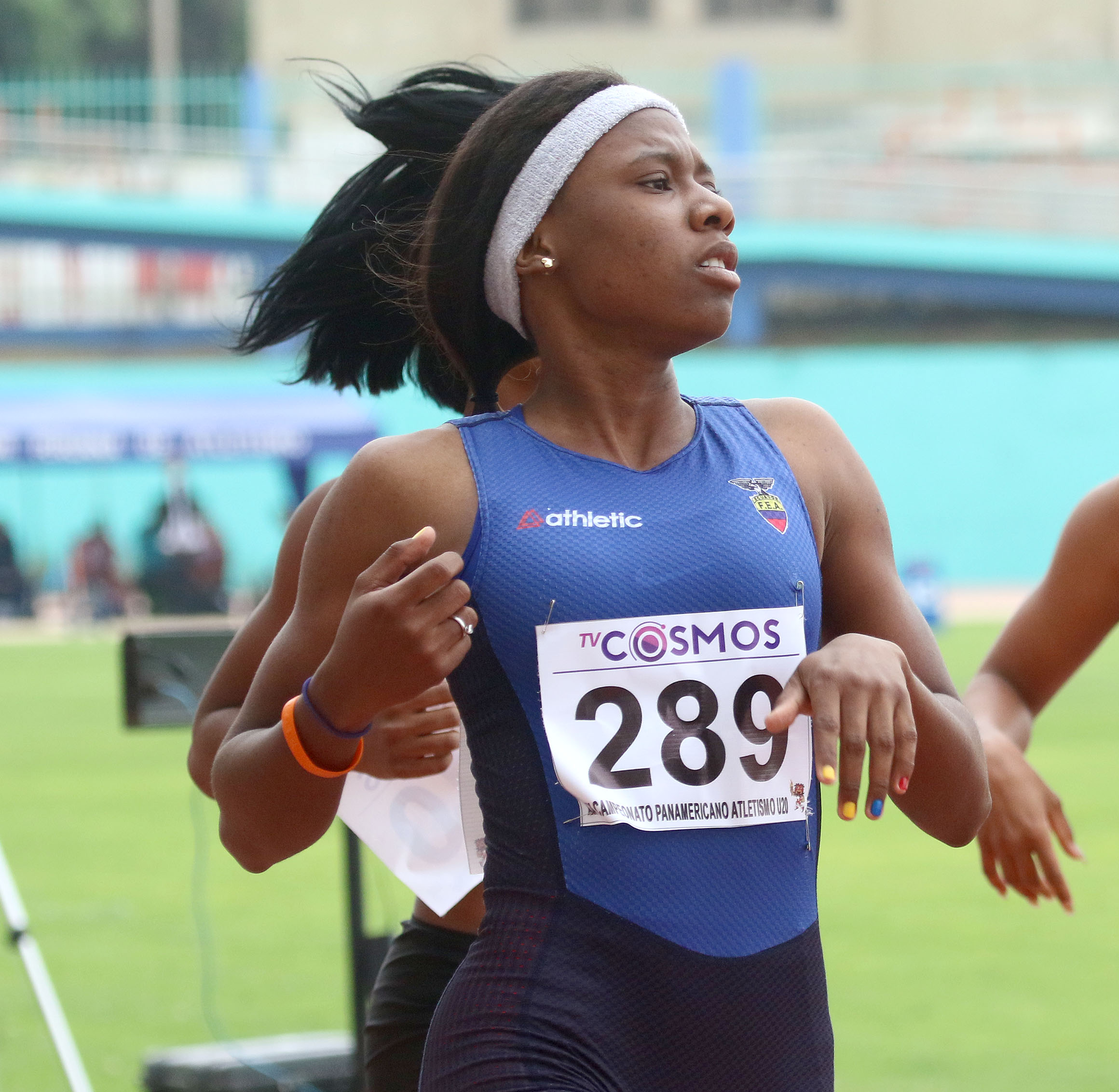
- Caicedo at the 2017 Pan American Championships in Trujillo, Peru

Personal information
- Full name: Maribel Vanessa Caicedo Vernaza
- Born: April 1, 1998 (age 28) Guayaquil, Ecuador
- Height: 1.74 m (5 ft 9 in)
- Weight: 60 kg (132 lb)
Medal record
Women's hurdling
Representing Ecuador
World Youth Championships
Gold medal – first place	2015 Cali
Bolivarian Games
Bronze medal – third place	2017 Santa Marta
Bolivarian Games
Silver medal – second place	2022 Valledupar

Maribel Vanessa Caicedo Vernaza (born April 1, 1998) is an Ecuadorian track and field athlete.

== Biography ==
On July 16, 2015, Maribel Caicedo won a gold medal in the 100 meter hurdles at the IAAF World Youth Championships in Athletics held in Colombia. She is the first Ecuadorian to gain a gold medal at the IAAF World Youth Championships. In 2017, she won a bronze medal at the Bolivarian Games, also in the 100 meter hurdles.

In December 2017, she traveled to Brandenton, Florida in the USA to train under the coach Loren Seagrave. She has also trained under Fátima Navarro.

In May 2018, she broke the previous Ecuadorian record for 100 meter hurdles set by Nancy Vallecilla in 1998, when she reached a time of 13.12 seconds, beating the record time of 13.16 seconds. On the same day, she broke the record once more with a time of 13.01 seconds. With this record, she reached seventh place in the South American ranking. For this, she obtained public recognition from the South America Athletics Confederation.

Caicedo competed for the Washington State Cougars track and field team in the NCAA.

Caicedo is an evangelical Christian.

== Statistics ==
Grand Slam Track results
Slam	Race group	Event	Pl.	Time	Prize money
2025 Miami Slam	Short hurdles	100 m hurdles	7th	13.12	US$15,000
2025 Miami Slam	Short hurdles	100 m	5th	11.47	US$15,000
