= Dina Aulia =

Indonesian athlete (born 2003)

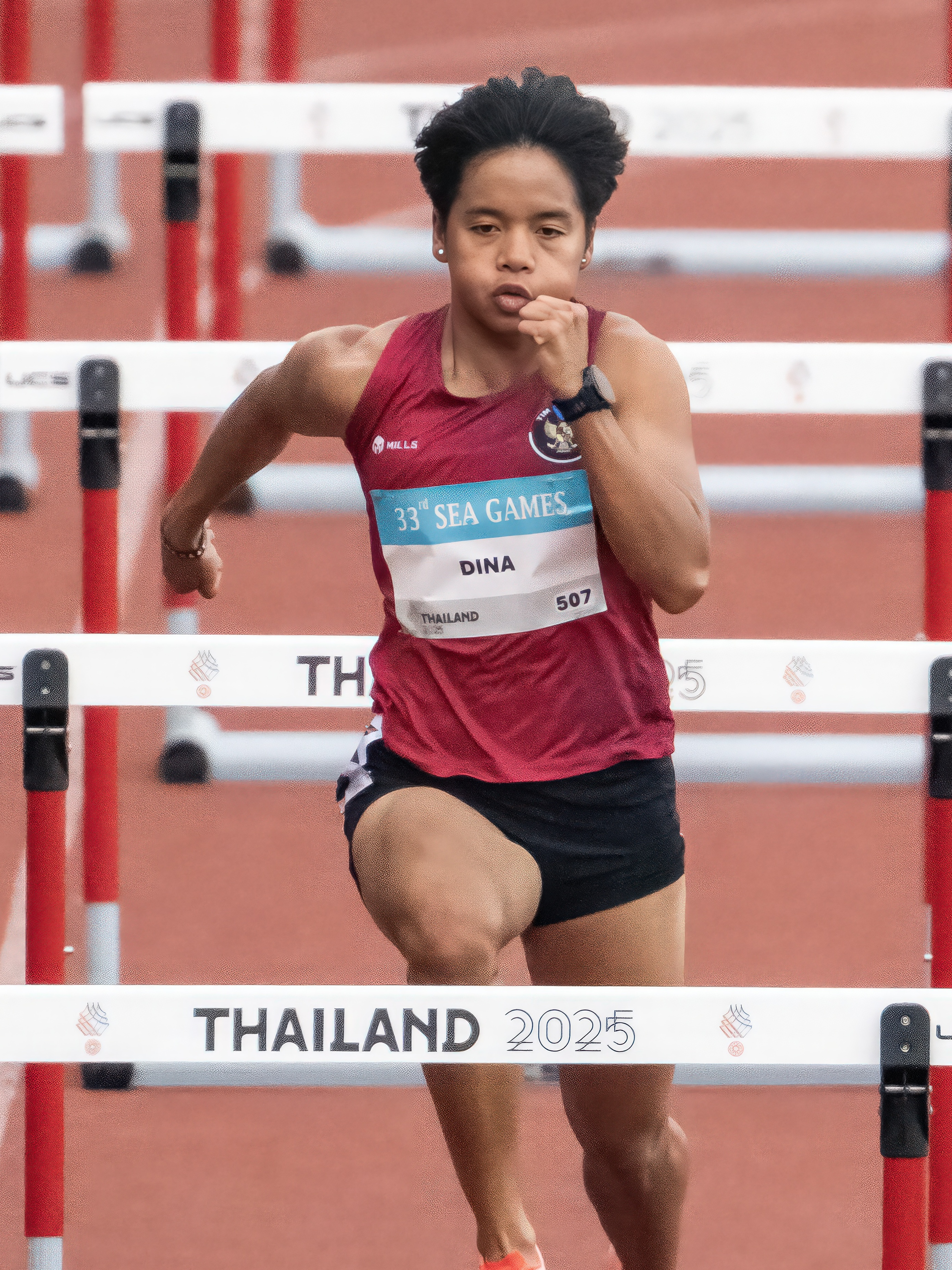
- Aulia at the 2025 Southeast Asian Games

Personal information
- Born: 3 August 2003 (age 23) Barabai, South Kalimantan, Indonesia

Sport
- Sport: Athletics
- Event: Hurdles

Achievements and titles
- Personal bests: 60 m hurdles: 8.24 (Nur-Sultan , 2023); 100 m hurdles: 13.11 (Gumi, 2025) NR
Medal record
Women's athletics
Representing Indonesia
SEA Games
Gold medal – first place	2025 Thailand	100m hurdles
Bronze medal – third place	2023 Cambodia	100m hurdles

Dina Aulia (born 3 August 2003) is an Indonesian hurdler. She is the national record holder in the 100 metres hurdles and competed at the 2025 World Championships.

== Career ==
In August 2022, Aulia broke the Indonesia under-20 national record in the 100 metres hurdles event, running 13.44 seconds twice, both in Round 1 and finishing third in the semi-final, at the 2022 World Athletics U20 Championships in Cali, Colombia, narrowly missing a place in the final as a fastest qualifier.

Aulia placed fifth over 60 metres hurdles at the 2023 Asian Indoor Athletics Championships in Nur-Sultan, Kazakhstan, running a personal best time of 8.24 seconds. In May 2023, she won the 100 metres hurdles bronze medal at the 2023 Southeast Asian Games in Phnom Penh, Cambodia.

In September 2024, she set a new Indonesian national record of 13.24 seconds for the 100 metres hurdles at the 2024 PON XXI Aceh-Sumut held in Sena Village, Batang Kuis District, Deli Serdang, North Sumatra, breaking the previous record set in 2016 by Emilia Nova. She also won the 100 metres race at the event.

She placed fourth in the 100 metres hurdles the 2025 Asian Athletics Championships in Gumi, South Korea, running a personal best of 13.11 seconds and setting a new national record. The sole female representative for Indonesia at the 2025 World Athletics Championships in Tokyo, Japan in September 2025, she finished sixth in her preliminary heat with a time of 13.28 seconds without advancing to the semi-finals. In December, she won the 100m hurdles gold medal at the 2025 SEA Games.

== Personal life ==
She is from Barabai in the Central Hulu Sungai Regency in South Kalimantan.
