= Wu Yanni =

Chinese hurdler (born 1997)

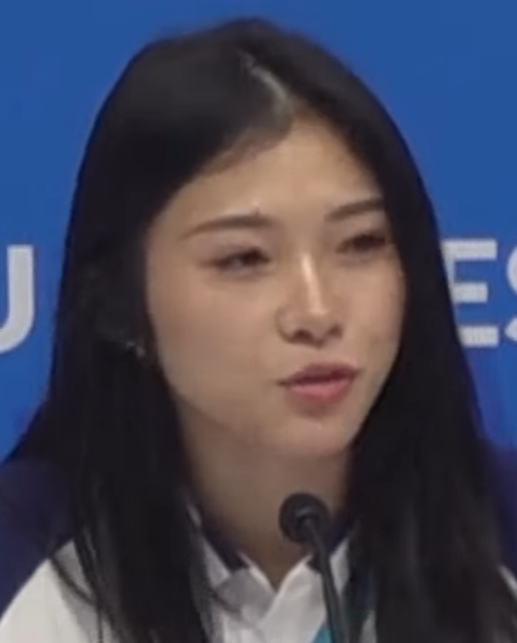
- Wu in 2023

Personal information
- Native name: 吴艳妮
- Born: 28 July 1997 (age 29) Fushun County, Sichuan, China

Sport
- Country: China
- Sport: Running
- Event: 100 m hurdles

Achievements and titles
- Personal bests: 60 m hurdles: 8.01 (Nanjing, 2025) NR; 100 m: 12.11 (Chongqing, 2022); 100 m hurdles: 12.74 (Rizhao, 2024)
Medal record
Women's athletics
Representing China
Asian Games
Bronze medal – third place	2026 Nagoya	100 m hurdles
Asian Championships
Bronze medal – third place	2025 Gumi	100 m hurdles
Summer World University Games
Silver medal – second place	2021 Chengdu	100 m hurdles

Wu Yanni (Chinese: 吴艳妮; pinyin: Wú Yànnī; born 28 July 1997) is a Chinese track and field athlete. She is a multiple time Chinese national champion in the 100 metres hurdles and Chinese national record holder in the 60 metres hurdles. She was a bronze medalist in the 100 metres hurdles at the 2025 Asian Athletics Championships and 2026 Asian Games.

== Early life ==
Wu was born in Zigong, a city in southern Sichuan, she started her hurdling career in Neijiang before moving to study at Beijing Sports University.

== Career ==
On 15 September 2016, while representing Sichuan team in the women's 100 m hurdles at the 2016 National Track and Field Championships, she won third place in 13.58 seconds. On 4 September, at the 13th National Games held in Tianjin, she won third place in 13.36 seconds. She won the Chinese national title in the 100 metres hurdles in 2023. She qualified for the final of the 2023 Asian Athletics Championships, held in Bangkok, but was disqualified in the final due to a false start. Yanni won silver in the 100 m women’s hurdles in the World University Games in Chengdu in August 2023, running a personal best time in the semi finals of 12.85 seconds, before breaking it again later that day in the final, where she clocked a time of 12.76 seconds.

During the women's 100-meter hurdles final of track and field at the 2022 Asian Games, Wu was disqualified for her false start.

She was selected for the 2024 World Athletics Indoor Championships in Glasgow to compete in the women's 60 metres hurdles, where she ran a personal best time of 8.12 seconds.

She won the 100 m hurdles at the World Continental Tour Gold event in Tokyo on 19 May 2024. She set a new personal best of 12.74 seconds in the 100 m hurdles to win the Chinese Athletics Championships in June 2024. She was named in the Chinese team for the 2024 Paris Olympics. At the Olympics, Wu ranked sixth in her group with a time of 12.97 seconds in the preliminaries and fourth in her group with a time of 12.98 seconds in the repechange round, but still created the best result for a Chinese athlete in the women's 100 m hurdles.

She qualified for the semi-finals of the 60 metres hurdles at the 2025 World Athletics Indoor Championships in Nanjing, where she ran a national record time of 8.01 seconds, missing a place in the final in front of her home crowd by 0.01 of a second. She finished seventh in the 100 m hurdles at the 2025 Xiamen Diamond League event in China, in April 2025. The following week, she ran a seasons best 12.96 seconds at the 2025 Shanghai Diamond League event in China on 3 May 2025. That month, she won the bronze medal in the 100 metres hurdles at the 2025 Asian Athletics Championships. Yanni won the 100 m hurdles in 13.15 seconds at the 2025 Chinese Athletics Championships in Quzhou. She competed for China at the 2025 World Athletics Championships in Tokyo, Japan.

Competing at the 2026 Asian Games in Nagoya, Japan, she won the bronze medal in the 100 metres hurdles final.

== Personal life ==
She has been nicknamed “China’s goddess of track and field” and attracted social media attention due to her outgoing personality and body tattoos, which she has said are a symbol of her self confidence.
