= Denmark at the 2022 European Athletics Championships =

- Flag of Denmark
- WA code: DEN
- National federation: Danish Athletics Federation

in Munich, Germany 15 August 2022 – 21 August 2022
- Competitors: 28 (16 men and 12 women) in 17 events
- Medals Ranked 28th: Gold 0 Silver 0 Bronze 1 Total 1

European Athletics Championships appearances
- 1934; 1938; 1946; 1950; 1954; 1958; 1962; 1966; 1969; 1971; 1974; 1978; 1982; 1986; 1990; 1994; 1998; 2002; 2006; 2010; 2012; 2014; 2016; 2018; 2022; 2024; 2026

Denmark competed at the 2022 European Athletics Championships in Munich, Germany, between 15 and 21 August 2022.

== Medallists ==
Medal	Name	Event	Date
Bronze	Ida Karstoft	Women's 200 metres	19 August

== Results ==
Denmark entered the following athletes.

Key

- Q = Qualified for the next round
- q = Qualified for the next round as a fastest loser or, in field events, by position without achieving the qualifying target
- NR = National record
- PB = Personal best
- SB = Season best
- N/A = Round not applicable for the event

=== Men ===
Track and road events

Athlete	Event	Heat		Semifinal		Final	
Athlete	Event	Result	Rank	Result	Rank	Result	Rank
Kojo Musah	100 m	DNF	–	Did not advance			
Frederik Schou-Nielsen	100 m	10.34	5	Did not advance			
Simon Hansen	200 m	20.81	5 q	DNS	–	Did not advance	
Tazana Kamanga-Dyrbak	200 m	20.88	5	Did not advance			
Gustav Lundholm Nielsen	400 m	46.05 SB	5 q	46.30	8	Did not advance	
Benjamin Lobo Vedel	400 m	45.50 =NR	1 Q	DNS	–	Did not advance	
Joel Ibler Lillesø	5000 m	—N/a				13:50.24	22
Rune Bækgaard	Marathon	—N/a				2:31:37	62
Andreas Lommer	Marathon	—N/a				2:20:34	46
Martin Egebjerg Olesen	Marathon	—N/a				2:28:04	60
Abdi Hakin Ulad	Marathon	—N/a				2:16:41	27
Jakob Dybdal Abrahamsen	3000 m steeplechase	9:05.26	14	—N/a		Did not advance	
Axel Vang Christensen	3000 m steeplechase	DNF	–	—N/a		Did not advance	
Rasmus Thornbjerg Klausen; Frederik Schou-Nielsen; Tobias Larsen; Tazana Kamanga-Dyrbak	4 × 100 m relay	DNF	–	—N/a		Did not advance	

Field events

Athlete	Event	Qualification		Final	
Athlete	Event	Distance	Position	Distance	Position
Arthur Wiborg Petersen	Javelin throw	72.82	21	Did not advance	

=== Women ===
Track and road events

Athlete	Event	Heat		Semifinal		Final	
Athlete	Event	Result	Rank	Result	Rank	Result	Rank
Mathilde Kramer	100 m	11.58	6	Did not advance			
Ida Karstoft	200 m	Bye		22.73	1 Q	22.72	3rd place, bronze medalist(s)
Karen Ehrenreich	Marathon	—N/a				2:44:28	43
Mette Graversgaard	100 m hurdles	Bye		12.87	3 q	12.99	6
Mathilde Heltbech	100 m hurdles	13.41	5	Did not advance			
Annemarie Nissen	400 m hurdles	57.71	8	Did not advance			
Mette Graversgaard; Mathilde Kramer; Emma Beiter Bomme; Astrid Glenner-Frandsen	4 × 100 m relay	44.20	6	—N/a		Did not advance	

Field events

Athlete	Event	Qualification		Final	
Athlete	Event	Distance	Position	Distance	Position
Caroline Bonde Holm	Pole vault	4.50	=4 q	4.55 NR	=4
Lisa Brix Pedersen	Discus throw	59.40	8 q	57.02	10
Katrine Koch Jacobsen	Hammer throw	68.26	7 q	67.06	10
