= Denmark at the 2026 European Athletics Championships =

- Flag of Denmark
- WA code: DEN

in Birmingham, United Kingdom 10–16 August 2026
- Competitors: 28 (11 men and 17 women)
- Medals: Gold 0 Silver 0 Bronze 0 Total 0

European Athletics Championships appearances
- 1934; 1938; 1946; 1950; 1954; 1958; 1962; 1966; 1969; 1971; 1974; 1978; 1982; 1986; 1990; 1994; 1998; 2002; 2006; 2010; 2012; 2014; 2016; 2018; 2022; 2024; 2026

Denmark competed at the 2026 European Athletics Championships in Birmingham, United Kingdom from 10–16 August 2026.

== Results ==
Denmark entered the following athletes.

Key

- Q = Qualified for the next round
- q = Qualified for the next round as a fastest loser or, in field events, by position without achieving the qualifying target
- NR = National record
- PB = Personal best
- SB = Season best
- N/A = Round not applicable for the event

=== Men ===
Track and road events

Athlete	Event	Heat		Semifinal		Final	
Athlete	Event	Result	Rank	Result	Rank	Result	Rank
Simon Hansen	100 m	10.46	5 q	10.40	7	Did not advance	
Gustav Lundholm Nielsen	400 m	45.83	10 q	45.65	7	Did not advance	
Joel Ibler Lillesø	5000 m	—N/a				13:32.58	15
Jacob Dahl	Marathon	—N/a				2:27:04	49
Martin Egebjerg Olesen	Marathon	—N/a				2:18:28 SB	34
Sebastian Monneret	400 m hurdles	49.94	13 q	50.17	8	Did not advance	
Gustav Lundholm Nielsen; Neloo Falck; Jacob Hvorup; Sebastian Monneret	4 × 400 m relay	3:02.19 NR	6	—N/a		Did not advance	

Field events

Athlete	Event	Qualification		Final	
Athlete	Event	Distance	Position	Distance	Position
Arthur W. Petersen	Javelin throw	79.30 SB	10 q	71.63	11

=== Women ===
Track and road events

Athlete	Event	Heat		Semifinal		Final	
Athlete	Event	Result	Rank	Result	Rank	Result	Rank
Annemarie Nissen	1500 m	4:10.77	10	—N/a		Did not advance	
Kathrine Højgaard	Marathon	—N/a				2:45:42	43
Luna Paltorp	Marathon	—N/a				2:40:38	36
Ida Beiter Bomme	100 m hurdles	12.88	5 q	13.16	6	Did not advance	
Annika Baun Haldbo	100 m hurdles	12.94 PB	8 q	13.17	7	Did not advance	
Mette Laugesen Kammer	100 m hurdles	12.92 SB	6 q	13.14	6	Did not advance	
Martha Rasmussen	400 m hurdles	56.34 PB	12 q	56.74	8	Did not advance	
Anna Mark Helwigh	3000 m steeplechase	9:51.20	12	—N/a		Did not advance	
Juliane Hvid	3000 m steeplechase	9:37.27	9	—N/a		Did not advance	
Mette Laugesen Kammer; Amaya Kruse Jørgensen; Ronja Christophersen; Annika Baun Haldbo	4 × 100 m relay	43.49 SB	6	—N/a		Did not advance	

Field events

Athlete	Event	Qualification		Final	
Athlete	Event	Distance	Position	Distance	Position
Ida Beiter Bomme	Long jump	6.57	15	Did not advance	
Janne Nielsen	Triple jump	13.23	25	Did not advance	
Anne Juul Jensen	Discus throw	56.58	18	Did not advance	
Annesofie Hartmann Nielsen	Discus throw	57.99	14	Did not advance	
Lisa Brix Pedersen	Discus throw	57.78	15	Did not advance	
Katrine Koch Jacobsen	Hammer throw	72.62	1 Q	68.70	9
