= Denmark at the 2018 European Athletics Championships =

- WA code: DEN
- National federation: DAF
- Website: www.dansk-atletik.dk

in Berlin
- Competitors: 11
- Medals: Gold 0 Silver 0 Bronze 0 Total 0

European Athletics Championships appearances
- 1934; 1938; 1946; 1950; 1954; 1958; 1962; 1966; 1969; 1971; 1974; 1978; 1982; 1986; 1990; 1994; 1998; 2002; 2006; 2010; 2012; 2014; 2016; 2018; 2022; 2024; 2026

Denmark competed at the 2018 European Athletics Championships in Berlin, Germany, from 6–12 August 2018. A delegation of 11 athletes were sent to represent the country.

The following athletes were selected to compete by the Danish Athletics Federation.

Men
Track and road

Athletes	Event	Heats		Semifinal		Final	
Athletes	Event	Result	Rank	Result	Rank	Result	Rank
Andreas Bube	800 metres	1:47.94	15 Q	1:46.40	5 Q	1:45.92 SB	5
Abdi Hakin Ulad	Marathon	—N/a				did not finish	
Ole Hesselbjerg	3000 metres steeplechase	8:30.44	15 q	—N/a		8:48.48	15

Field events

Athletes	Event	Qualification		Final	
Athletes	Event	Distance	Position	Distance	Position
Jonas Kløjgaard Jensen	High jump	2.16	20	did not advance	

Women
Track and road

Athletes	Event	Heats		Semifinal		Final	
Athletes	Event	Result	Rank	Result	Rank	Result	Rank
Sara Slott Petersen	400 metres hurdles	—N/a		56.91	18	did not finish	
Anna Emilie Møller	3000 metres steeplechase	9:34.46 SB	8 Q	—N/a		9:31.66 NR	7
Astrid Glenner-Frandsen; Mette Graversgaard; Ida Kathrine Karstoft; Mathilde Kramer; Louise Østergård	4 × 100 metres relay	44.09 NR	11	—N/a		did not advance	

== See also ==
- Denmark at the 2018 European Championships
