= Denmark at the 2016 European Athletics Championships =

- WA code: DEN
- National federation: DAF
- Website: dansk-atletik.dk

in Amsterdam
- Competitors: 12 (8 men and 4 women) in 9 events
- Medals Ranked 17th: Gold 1 Silver 0 Bronze 0 Total 1

European Athletics Championships appearances
- 1934; 1938; 1946; 1950; 1954; 1958; 1962; 1966; 1969; 1971; 1974; 1978; 1982; 1986; 1990; 1994; 1998; 2002; 2006; 2010; 2012; 2014; 2016; 2018; 2022; 2024; 2026

Denmark competed at the 2016 European Athletics Championships in Amsterdam, Netherlands, between 6 and 10 July 2016.

== Medals ==
Medal	Name	Event	Date
Gold	Sara Slott Petersen	400 m hurdles	10 July

== Results ==
Men

Track & road events

Athlete	Event	Heat		Semifinal		Final	
Athlete	Event	Result	Rank	Result	Rank	Result	Rank
Andreas Bube	800 m	1:48.36	8 Q	1:47.55	9	did not advance	
Andreas Bueno	1500 m	3:46.44	31	—N/a		did not advance	
Andreas Martinsen	110 m hurdles	13.65 SB	5 Q	13.89	23	did not advance	
Nicolai Hartling	400 m hurdles	51.49	17	did not advance			
Jakob Dybdal Abrahamsen	3000 m steeplechase	DNF		—N/a		did not advance	
Ole Hesselbjerg	3000 m steeplechase	8:32.17	5 Q	—N/a		8:42.27	11
Abdi Hakin Ulad	Half marathon	—N/a				1:03:22	5

Field Events

Athlete	Event	Qualification		Final	
Athlete	Event	Distance	Rank	Distance	Rank
Rasmus Jørgensen	Pole vault	5.35	19	did not advance	

Women

Track & road events

Athlete	Event	Heat		Semifinal		Final	
Athlete	Event	Result	Rank	Result	Rank	Result	Rank
Sara Slott Petersen	400 m hurdles	—N/a		55.59	1 Q	55.12 SB	1st place, gold medalist(s)
Stina Troest	400 m hurdles	56.32 SB	1 Q	56.03 SB	7 q	56.34	7
Anna Sofie Holm Baumeister	Half marathon	—N/a				1:15:40	44
Jess Draskau-Petersson	Half marathon	—N/a				1:13:50	31
