= Denmark at the 2014 European Athletics Championships =

- WA code: DEN
- National federation: Dansk Atletik Forbund
- Website: www.dansk-atletik.dk

in Zürich
- Competitors: 16 in 11 events
- Medals: Gold 0 Silver 0 Bronze 0 Total 0

European Athletics Championships appearances
- 1934; 1938; 1946; 1950; 1954; 1958; 1962; 1966; 1969; 1971; 1974; 1978; 1982; 1986; 1990; 1994; 1998; 2002; 2006; 2010; 2012; 2014; 2016; 2018; 2022; 2024; 2026

Denmark are competing in the 2014 European Athletics Championships in Zürich, Switzerland. Sixteen athletes were selected for the championships, making it the biggest team since the 2002 championships.

== Men ==
=== Track and road ===
Event	Athlete	Heats		Semi-final		Final	
Event	Athlete	Result	Rank	Result	Rank	Result	Rank
400 metres	Nick Ekelund-Arenader	45.91	13 Q	47.16	23	DNQ	
800 metres	Andreas Bube	1:47.50	3 Q	1:46.09 SB	3 Q	1:45.21 SB	4
1500 metres	Andreas Bueno	3:42.06	20	Not held		DNQ	
10,000 metres	Abdi Hakin Ulad	Not held				29:50.67	15
Marathon	Peter Bech	Not held				2:28:38	48
Marathon	Lars Budolfsen	Not held				2:17:54	17
Marathon	Jesper Faurschou	Not held				2:18:12	22
Marathon	Henrik Them	Not held				2:17:55	19
Marathon Cup	3 athletes: Lars Budolfsen; Jesper Faurschou; Henrik Them	Not held				6:54:01	5
110 m hurdles	Andreas Martinsen	13.97	=27	DNQ			
400 m hurdles	Nicolai Hartling	51.15	29	DNQ			
4 × 400 m relay	4 athletes: Festus Asante; Andreas Bube; Nick Ekelund-Arenander; Nicklas Hyde	3:08.12	13	Not held		DNQ	

Q
Qualified by heat position
DNQ
Did not qualify
SB
Season best

== Women ==
=== Track and road ===
Event	Athlete	Heats		Semi-final		Final	
Event	Athlete	Result	Rank	Result	Rank	Result	Rank
Marathon	Jessica Draskau-Petersson	Not held				2:30:53 PB	8
400 m hurdles	Sara Petersen	DQ	–	DNQ			
400 m hurdles	Stina Troest	56.95	10 q	56.81	12	DNQ	

PB
Personal best
DQ
Disqualified
- Petersen was disqualified for a false start in her heat
DNQ
Did not qualify
q
Qualified by time

=== Field ===
Event	Athlete	Qualifying		Final	
Event	Athlete	Result	Rank	Result	Rank
Pole vault	Caroline Bonde Holm	4.25	23	DNQ	

DNQ
Did not qualify
