= Denmark at the 2024 European Athletics Championships =

- Flag of Denmark
- WA code: DEN

in Rome, Italy 7 June 2024 – 12 June 2022
- Competitors: 28 (11 men and 17 women)
- Medals: Gold 0 Silver 0 Bronze 0 Total 0

European Athletics Championships appearances
- 1934; 1938; 1946; 1950; 1954; 1958; 1962; 1966; 1969; 1971; 1974; 1978; 1982; 1986; 1990; 1994; 1998; 2002; 2006; 2010; 2012; 2014; 2016; 2018; 2022; 2024; 2026

Denmark competed at the 2024 European Athletics Championships in Rome, Italy from 7–12 June 2024.

== Medallists ==
Medal	Name	Event	Date

== Results ==
Denmark entered the following athletes.

Key

- Q = Qualified for the next round
- q = Qualified for the next round as a fastest loser or, in field events, by position without achieving the qualifying target
- NR = National record
- PB = Personal best
- SB = Season best
- N/A = Round not applicable for the event

=== Men ===
Track and road events

Athlete	Event	Heat		Semifinal		Final	
Athlete	Event	Result	Rank	Result	Rank	Result	Rank
Simon Hansen	100 metres	10.22	3 q	10.22	9 q	10.19 PB	7
Gustav Lundholm Nielsen	400 metres	45.84 SB	12 q	46.01	20	Did not advance	
Jacob Sommer Simonsen	Half marathon	—N/a				1:06:27	50
Ole Hesselbjerg	3000 metres steeplechase	8:38.99	11	—N/a		Did not advance	
Simon Hansen; Emil Mader Kjær; Jacob Hvorup; Frederik Schou-Nielsen; Rasmus Thornbjerg Klausen (heats)	4 × 100 metres relay	39.10	8 q	—N/a		39.21	6

Field events

Athlete	Event	Qualification		Final	
Athlete	Event	Distance	Position	Distance	Position
Arthur W. Petersen	Javelin throw	71.20	25	Did not advance	

=== Women ===
Track and road events

Athlete	Event	Heat		Semifinal		Final	
Athlete	Event	Result	Rank	Result	Rank	Result	Rank
Nanna Bové	Half marathon	—N/a				1:15:16 SB	53
Sara Schou Kristensen	Half marathon	—N/a				1:16:45	61
Carolien Millenaar	Half marathon	—N/a				1:16:40	60
Nanna Bové; Karen Ehrenreich; Sara Schou Kristensen; Carolien Millenaar	Half marathon team	—N/a				3:48:41	10
Mette Graversgaard	100 metres hurdles	13.42 SB	17	Did not advance			
Juliane Hvid	3000 metres steeplechase	9:42.32	9	—N/a		Did not advance	
Astrid Glenner-Frandsen; Mathilde U. Kramer; Mette Graversgaard; Klara Skriver Loessl	4 × 100 metres relay	44.21 SB	14	—N/a		Did not advance	

Field events

Athlete	Event	Qualification		Final	
Athlete	Event	Distance	Position	Distance	Position
Caroline Bonde Holm	Pole vault	4.25	23	Did not advance	
Annesofie Hartmann Nielsen	Discus throw	55.73	20	Did not advance	
Lisa Brix Pedersen	Discus throw	57.64	15	Did not advance	
Katrine Koch Jacobsen	Hammer throw	72.88 SB	1 Q	70.57	5
