= Harald Agger =

Danish hammer thrower (1889–1954)

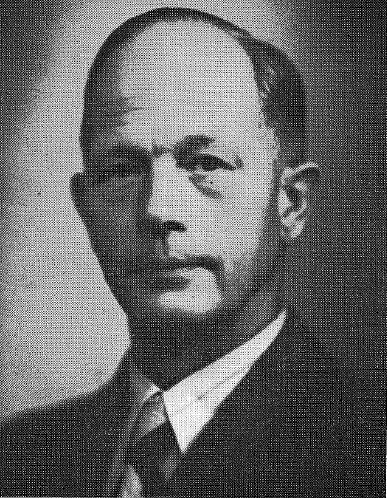

Personal information
- Nationality: Danish
- Born: 11 April 1889 Struer, Denmark
- Died: 20 May 1954 (aged 65) Holstebro, Denmark

Sport
- Sport: Athletics
- Event: Hammer throw

Harald Agger (11 April 1889 – 20 May 1954) was a Danish athlete who competed in the hammer throw, shot put, discus throw, high jump, and pole vault. He was a multiple-time Danish Athletics Championships winner and competed in the men's hammer throw at the 1908 Summer Olympics.

== Personal life ==
Agger was born on 11 April 1889 in Gimsing Sogn, Struer Municipality, Denmark. Outside of his athletics career, he was a dentist and married to Karen Margrethe Agger. He is the cousin of Danish painter Knud Agger.

He founded the AK-Holstebro athletics club in 1920 after a falling out with the Holstebro Sports Association. In the early years of AK-Holstebro, Agger gave away his own trophies as prizes because the club did not have enough money to afford its own medals. This led to an amusing situation where Denmark's top javelin thrower was given a trophy with the Danish inscription "Danish champion Harald Agger".

He was once profiled by Idrætsbladet, where the author described Agger in Danish as the most beautifully built athlete he had ever met. In 1939, he received a badge of honor from the Danish Athletics Federation.

In 1944, Agger helped start the Danish resistance movement in Holstebro during World War II. He had to go into hiding when a local communist leader was captured by the Germans.

== Career ==
Agger won eight Danish Athletics Championships titles over his career. He first won the 1908 championships in the high jump followed 1909 titles in the discus throw and pole vault along with a runner-up high jump placing. He then won 1911 titles in the high jump and shot put before placing runner-up in the high jump at the 1916 championships. Agger also won shot put championships in 1919 and 1925.

Agger was seeded in the 'B' qualifying round of the hammer throw at the 1908 Olympics. He threw less than 37.35 metres and did not advance to the finals. As of 2016, Agger was still the 3rd-youngest hammer throw competitor in Olympic history having competed at 19 years and 94 days.
