= Danish Athletics Championships =

- Sport: Track and field
- Founded: 1894
- Country: Denmark

The Danish Athletics Championships (Danish: Danske mesterskaber i atletik, abbreviated DM) is an annual outdoor track and field competition organised by the Danish Athletics Federation (DAF), which serves as the Danish national championships for the sport. Founded in 1894, the three-day event is typically held in early or mid-summer and the venue has varied between Esbjerg, Holte, Odense, København, Roskilde, Aabenraa, Blovstrød, Maribo, Aalborg, Vallensbæk, and Aabenraa since 2002. It is open to adults of all ages and is thus referred to as the senior championships, as opposed to the U20 or U18 championships.

In 2021, sprinter Kojo Musah set a then-Danish record of 10.14 seconds in the 100 metres at the championships.

The next championship will be held on 29–30 June 2024.

== Editions ==
Year	Date	Venue	Ref.
2002	25-25 August	Esbjerg	
2003	17-17 August	Holte	
2004	10-10 October	Odense	
2005	21-21 August	København	
2006	22-23 July	Odense	
2007	12-12 August	Randers	
2008	9-9 August	Holte	
2009	29-30 August	Odense	
2010	21-22 August	Roskilde	
2011	19-20 August	Aabenraa	
2012	25-26 August	København	
2013	10-10 August	Blovstrød	
2014	23-23 August	Holte	
2015	15-16 August	Maribo	
2016	27-28 August	Aarhus	
2017	2-3 September	Aalborg	
2018	24-26 August	Odense	
2019	26-28 July	Esbjerg	
2020	3-4 October	Vallensbæk	
2021	18-18 September	København	
2022	17-18 September	Aabenraa	
2023	16-17 September	Esbjerg	
2024	29-30 June	Hvidovre	

== Championship records ==
Compiled using winning marks from 1960-2002 and results from 2003-2023.

=== Men ===
Event	Record	Athlete/Team	Date	Place	Ref.
100 m	10.11 (−0.1 m/s)	Simon Hansen	29 June 2024	Hvidovre	
200m	20.53	Simon Hansen	2022		
400m	46.05	Gustav Lundholm Nielsen	2023		
800m	1:48.00	Wilson Kipketer	1994		
1500m	3:40.45	Kristian Uldbjerg Hansen	2023		
5000m	13:45.57	Dennis Jensen	2001		
10,000m	28:48.54	Christian Olsen	2005		
24 hours	223251 m	Johnny Dietz Visholm	2020		
110m Hurdles	13.68 (+1.9 m/s)	Andreas Martinsen	2015		
400m Hurdles	50.82	Nicolai Trock Hartling	2016		
3000m Steeplechase	8:35.6	Allan Zachariasen	1983		
High Jump	2.22 m	Janick Klausen	2016		
Pole Vault	5.70 m	Piotr Buciarski	1997		
Long Jump	8.03 m (+0.3 m/s)	Morten Jensen	2004		
Triple jump	16.88 m (+0.6 m/s)	Anders Møller	7 August 2011	Copenhagen	
Shot Put	21.00 m	Jan Cordius	1996		
Discus Throw	58.80 m	Joachim Olsen	2001		
Hammer Throw	74.96 m	Jan Bielecki	2002		
Javelin Throw	77.38 m	Thomas Jørgensen	1996		
Weight Throw	21.95 m	Jan Bielecki	2004		
Pentathlon	3851 pts	Lars Warming	1987		
Decathlon	7741 pts	Lars Warming	1989		
Throws Pentathlon	4720 pts	Stefan Lehnert	2021		

Event	Record	Athlete/Team	Date	Place	Ref.
100m	11.40 (+1.1 m/s)	Mathilde U. Kramer	2021		
100m (wind assisted)	11.36 (+2.5 m/s)	Mathilde U. Kramer	2021		
200m	23.52	Dorthe A. Rasmussen	1983		
200m (wind assisted)	23.1 (wind assisted)	Dorthe A. Rasmussen	1981		
400m	53.39	Sara Slott Petersen	2020		
800m	2:03.12	Tina Krebs	1983		
1500m	4:11.97	Tina Krebs	1985		
5000m	15:35.04	Anna Emilie Møller	2019		
10,000m	32:43.19	Dorte Vibjerg	2003		
100m Hurdles	12.84 (+0.9 m/s)	Mette Graversgaard	2022		
400m Hurdles	56.79	Sara Slott Petersen	2014		
3000m Steeplechase	9:34.85	Anna Emilie Møller	2018		
24 hours	200819 m	Katja Lykke Tonstad	2023		
4 x 100m	47.16	Frederiksberg IF	2018		
Discus Throw	62.22 m	Lisa Brix Pedersen	2023		
Hammer Throw	71.06 m	Katrine Koch Jacobsen	2022		
Heptathlon	5652 pts	Karla Schärfe	2023		
High Jump	1.87 m	Pia Zinck	1998		
Javelin Throw	61.72 m	Christina Scherwin	2005		
Long Jump	6.84 m	Renata Nielsen	1993		
Pole Vault	4.51 m	Caroline Bonde Holm	2022		
Shot Put	17.48 m	Julia Ritter	2021		
Throws Pentathlon	3977 pts	Lise Lotte Jepsen	2021		
Triple Jump	13.82 m (+1.2 m/s)	Janne Nielsen	2020		
Weight Throw	18.23 m	Celina Julin	2015		
5000m Race Walk	21:34.93	Jacob Sørensen	2003		
