= IAAF World Youth Championships in Athletics =

Former global track and field athletics event

The IAAF U18 Championships in Athletics (until 2015 known as IAAF World Youth Championships in Athletics) was a global athletics event comprising track and field events for competitors who were 17 or younger (youth = Under-18). The event was organized by International Association of Athletics Federations (IAAF). It was held biennially from 1999 to 2017.

== Name change and cancellation ==
In the 206th IAAF Council Meeting, held after the 2016 Summer Olympics, the council decided to conclude the world championship for under-18 athletes after the 2017 event. The decision was made with the intention of improving under-18 competitions at continental level instead. The competition was renamed to the IAAF World U18 Championships in November 2015, though ultimately only the 2017 competition used this title.

The competition was the under-18 counterpart to the World U20 Championships, which are for athletes who are 19 years of age or under in the year of competition.

== Editions ==
Edition	Year	City	Country	Date	Venue	Top of the medal table
1st	1999	Bydgoszcz	Poland	16–18 July	Zdzisław Krzyszkowiak Municipal Stadium	Kenya
2nd	2001	Debrecen	Hungary	12–15 July	Gyulai István Athletic Stadium	United States
3rd	2003	Sherbrooke	Canada	9–13 July	Université de Sherbrooke Stadium	United States
4th	2005	Marrakesh	Morocco	13–17 July	Stade Sidi-Youssef-Ben-Ali	United States
5th	2007	Ostrava	Czech Republic	11–15 July	Městský stadion	United States
6th	2009	Brixen	Italy	8–12 July	Raiffeisen Arena di Bressanone	Kenya
7th	2011	Lille	France	6–10 July	Stadium Lille Métropole	United States
8th	2013	Donetsk	Ukraine	10–14 July	RSC Olimpiyskiy	Jamaica
9th	2015	Cali	Colombia	15–19 July	Cali Olympic Stadium	United States
10th	2017	Nairobi	Kenya	12–16 July	Moi International Sports Centre	South Africa

== Championships records ==
Key: Defunct event

=== Boys ===
Event	Record (wind speed)	Name	Nation	Date	Games	Ref.	Video
100 m	10.28 (−0.4 m/s)	Abdul Hakim Sani Brown	Japan	15 July 2015	2015 Cali		
200 m	20.34 (−0.4 m/s)	Abdul Hakim Sani Brown	Japan	19 July 2015	2015 Cali		
400 m	45.24	Kirani James	Grenada	10 July 2009	2009 Brixen		
800 m	1:44.08	Leonard Kirwa Kosencha	Kenya	9 July 2011	2011 Lille		
1500 m	3:36.38	Kumari Taki	Kenya	17 July 2015	2015 Cali		
3000 m	7:40.10	William Malel Sitonik	Kenya	10 July 2011	2011 Lille		
110 m hurdles (91.4 cm)	13.04 A (+0.1 m/s)	De'Jour Russell	Jamaica	14 July 2017	2017 Nairobi		
400 m hurdles (84.0 cm)	49.01	William Wynne	United States	15 July 2007	2007 Ostrava		
2000 m steeplechase	5:19.99	Meresa Kahsay	Ethiopia	12 July 2013	2013 Donetsk		
High jump	2.27 m	Huang Haiqiang	China	16 July 2005	2005 Marrakesh		
Pole vault	5.30 m	Armand Duplantis	Sweden	19 July 2015	2015 Cali		
Pole vault	5.30 m	Vladyslav Malykhin	Ukraine	19 July 2015	2015 Cali		
Long jump	8.05 m (+0.5 m/s)	Maykel Massó	Cuba	16 July 2015	2015 Cali		
Triple jump	17.30 m A (+0.6 m/s)	Jordan A. Díaz	Cuba	14 July 2017	2017 Nairobi		
Shot put (5 kg)	24.35 m	Jacko Gill	New Zealand	7 July 2011	2011 Lille		
Discus throw (1.5 kg)	70.67 m	Mykyta Nesterenko	Ukraine	13 July 2007	2007 Ostrava		
Hammer throw (5 kg)	84.91 m	Hlib Piskunov	Ukraine	17 July 2015	2015 Cali		
Javelin throw (700 g)	83.16 m	Morné Moolman	South Africa	9 July 2011	2011 Lille		
Octathlon	6491 pts	Jake Stein	Australia	6–7 July 2011	2011 Lille		
Octathlon	100m (wind) / Long jump (wind) / Shot put / 400m / 110m H (wind) / High jump / Javelin / 1000m; 11.52 (−0.5 m/s) / 7.22 m (+1.2 m/s) / 17.22 m / 51.32 / 14.25 (−1.0 m/s) / 1.98 m / 59.65 m / 2:52.93						
Decathlon	8002 pts	Niklas Kaul	Germany	15–16 July 2015	2015 Cali		
Decathlon	100m / Long jump / Shot put / High jump / 400m / 110m H / Discus / Pole vault / Javelin / 1500m; 11.59 (−0.2 m/s) / 6.76 m (+1.1 m/s) / 16.08 m (5 kg) / 2.05 m / 51.20 / 15.44 (−0.7 m/s) (91.4 cm) / 44.09 m (1.5 kg) / 4.70 m / 78.20 m (700 g) / 4:42.29						
10,000 m walk (track)	40:51.31	Pavel Parshin	Russia	9 July 2011	2011 Lille		
Sprint medley relay	1:49.23	Waseem Williams; Michael O'Hara; Okeen Williams; Martin Manley	Jamaica	14 July 2013	2013 Donetsk		

=== Girls ===
Event	Record	Name	Nation	Date	Games	Ref.
100 m	11.08 (±0.0 m/s)	Candace Hill	United States	16 July 2015	2015 Cali	
200 m	22.43 (−0.7 m/s)	Candace Hill	United States	19 July 2015	2015 Cali	
400 m	51.19	Nawal El Jack	Sudan	15 July 2005	2005 Marrakesh	
800 m	2:01.13	Aníta Hinriksdóttir	Iceland	14 July 2013	2013 Donetsk	
1500 m	4:09.48	Faith Kipyegon	Kenya	9 July 2011	2011 Lille	
3000 m	8:53.94	Mercy Cherono	Kenya	11 July 2007	2007 Ostrava	
100 m hurdles (76.2 cm)	12.94 (±0.0 m/s)	Yanique Thompson	Jamaica	11 July 2013	2013 Donetsk	
400 m hurdles	55.94	Sydney McLaughlin	United States	18 July 2015	2015 Cali	
2000 m steeplechase	6:11.83	Korahubsh Itaa	Ethiopia	10 July 2009	2009 Brixen	
High jump	1.92 m	Iryna Kovalenko	Ukraine	12 July 2003	2003 Sherbrooke	
High jump	1.92 m A	Yaroslava Mahuchikh	Ukraine	14 July 2017	2017 Nairobi	
Pole vault	4.35 m	Vicky Parnov	Australia	14 July 2007	2007 Ostrava	
Long jump	6.47 m (+1.3 m/s)	Darya Klishina	Russia	15 July 2007	2007 Ostrava	
Triple jump	13.86 m (−0.6 m/s)	Cristine Spataru	Romania	11 July 2003	2003 Sherbrooke	
Shot put (3 kg)	20.14 m	Emel Dereli	Turkey	11 July 2013	2013 Donetsk	
Shot put (4 kg)	16.87 m	Valerie Adams	New Zealand	13 July 2001	2001 Debrecen	
Discus throw	56.34 m	Xie Yuchen	China	10 July 2013	2013 Donetsk	
Hammer throw (3 kg)	73.20 m	Réka Gyurátz	Hungary	13 July 2013	2013 Donetsk	
Hammer throw (4 kg)	64.61 m	Bianca Perie	Romania	14 July 2007	2007 Ostrava	
Javelin throw (500 g)	62.92 m A	Marisleisys Duarthe	Cuba	16 July 2017	2017 Nairobi	
Javelin throw (600 g)	59.74 m	Christin Hussong	Germany	7 July 2011	2011 Lille	
Heptathlon (4 kg Shot put & 600 g Javelin)	5875	Tatyana Chernova	Russia	15–16 July 2005	2005 Marrakesh	
Heptathlon (4 kg Shot put & 600 g Javelin)	100m H / High jump / Shot put / 200m / Long jump / Javelin / 800m; 13.62 (+1.4 m/s) / 1.69 m / 10.79 m / 24.79 (+0.2 m/s) / 6.13 m (+0.5 m/s) / 48.20 m / 2:21.91					
Heptathlon (with 3 kg Shot Put & 500 g Javelin)	6037	Géraldine Ruckstuhl	Switzerland	17–18 July 2015	2015 Cali	
Heptathlon (with 3 kg Shot Put & 500 g Javelin)	100m H / High jump / Shot put / 200m / Long jump / Javelin / 800m; 13.93 (+0.7 m/s) (76.2 cm) / 1.73 m / 14.25 m (3 kg) / 25.83 (−0.5 m/s) / 5.71 m (±0.0 m/s) / 52.87 m (500 g) / 2:17.58					
5000 m walk (track)	20:28.05	Tatyana Kalmykova	Russia	12 July 2007	2007 Ostrava	
Sprint medley relay	2:03.42	Christania Williams; Shericka Jackson; Chrisann Gordon; Olivia James	Jamaica	10 July 2011	2011 Lille	

== All-time medal table ==
- Correct as of 2017 edition

Rank	Nation	Gold	Silver	Bronze	Total
1	United States	50	41	40	131
2	Kenya	45	45	25	115
3	China	28	24	13	65
4	Russia	27	29	17	73
5	Jamaica	22	17	19	58
6	Germany	20	19	26	65
7	South Africa	18	15	16	49
8	Cuba	18	13	14	45
9	Ethiopia	16	18	20	54
10	Australia	14	14	13	41
11	Great Britain	14	5	13	32
12	France	11	6	13	30
13	Romania	10	4	10	24
14	Ukraine	7	13	10	30
15	Japan	6	9	16	31
16	Hungary	6	6	3	15
17	Sweden	5	7	3	15
18	Brazil	4	4	7	15
19	Czech Republic	4	4	6	14
20	Qatar	4	4	2	10
21	Sudan	4	0	2	6
22	Poland	3	9	4	16
23	Finland	3	4	3	10
24	Bahamas	3	0	2	5
24	Slovenia	3	0	2	5
26	Saudi Arabia	2	7	4	13
27	Croatia	2	4	2	8
28	Turkey	2	4	1	7
29	Italy	2	2	11	15
30	Bahrain	2	2	1	5
30	Ecuador	2	2	1	5
32	Chinese Taipei	2	1	2	5
33	Norway	2	1	1	4
33	South Korea	2	1	1	4
35	Grenada	2	1	0	3
35	New Zealand	2	1	0	3
37	Syria	2	0	0	2
38	Belarus	1	7	7	15
39	Spain	1	4	5	10
40	Greece	1	2	3	6
40	Trinidad and Tobago	1	2	3	6
42	Barbados	1	2	0	3
42	Ireland	1	2	0	3
44	Morocco	1	1	6	8
45	Bulgaria	1	1	3	5
46	Estonia	1	1	1	3
47	Moldova	1	1	0	2
47	Switzerland	1	1	0	2
47	Thailand	1	1	0	2
47	Venezuela	1	1	0	2
51	Uzbekistan	1	0	2	3
52	Argentina	1	0	1	2
52	Israel	1	0	1	2
52	Uruguay	1	0	1	2
55	Bermuda	1	0	0	1
55	Chile	1	0	0	1
55	Iceland	1	0	0	1
55	Iran	1	0	0	1
59	Canada	0	6	7	13
60	Latvia	0	4	4	8
61	Mexico	0	2	3	5
62	U.S. Virgin Islands	0	2	0	2
63	Colombia	0	1	2	3
63	Egypt	0	1	2	3
63	Eritrea	0	1	2	3
63	Slovakia	0	1	2	3
67	Montenegro	0	1	1	2
67	Serbia	0	1	1	2
–	Independent Athletes^{[1]}	0	1	1	2
69	Austria	0	1	0	1
69	Azerbaijan	0	1	0	1
69	British Virgin Islands	0	1	0	1
69	Cyprus	0	1	0	1
69	Denmark	0	1	0	1
69	Guyana	0	1	0	1
69	India	0	1	0	1
69	Nigeria	0	1	0	1
69	Samoa	0	1	0	1
69	Tajikistan	0	1	0	1
79	Belgium	0	0	2	2
79	Kazakhstan	0	0	2	2
79	Lithuania	0	0	2	2
82	Kuwait	0	0	1	1
82	Paraguay	0	0	1	1
82	Portugal	0	0	1	1
82	Saint Lucia	0	0	1	1
82	Turks and Caicos Islands	0	0	1	1
82	Uganda	0	0	1	1
82	United Arab Emirates	0	0	1	1
Totals (88 entries)		390	393	394	1,177

Notes

^[1] Independent Athletes were not included in the official medal table.

== See also ==
- Youth (athletics)
- World Para Athletics Junior Championships
