= Claus Jørgensen =

Claus Jørgensen may refer to:

- Claus Jørgensen (racewalker) (born 1974), Danish race walker
- Claus Bech Jørgensen (born 1976), Danish footballer
