= Athletics at the 2021 Summer World University Games – Women's discus throw =

The women's discus throw event at the 2021 Summer World University Games was held at the Shuangliu Sports Centre Stadium in Chengdu, China on 5 August 2023.

== Medalists ==
Gold	Silver	Bronze
Antonia Kinzel; Germany	Yolandi Stander; South Africa	Xie Yuchen; China

== Results ==
Rank	Name	Nationality	#1	#2	#3	#4	#5	#6	Result	Notes
1st place, gold medalist(s)	Antonia Kinzel	Germany	51.35	59.18	x	57.30	58.51	x	59.18	
2nd place, silver medalist(s)	Yolandi Stander	South Africa	57.89	56.35	x	x	56.53	57.41	57.89	
3rd place, bronze medalist(s)	Xie Yuchen	China	51.62	55.21	55.47	57.62	56.73	56.82	57.62	SB
4	Amanda Ngandu-Ntumba	France	57.36	x	54.82	56.10	x	55.88	57.36	
5	Wang Fang	China	57.25	55.64	55.99	x	56.83	55.57	57.25	
6	Helena Leveelahti	Finland	51.64	57.07	54.12	53.97	56.75	54.90	57.07	
7	Özlem Becerek	Turkey	55.57	56.51	x	55.91	54.56	55.09	56.51	
8	Maki Saito	Japan	53.27	x	54.28	x	52.93	51.77	54.28	
9	Jeong Ji-hye	South Korea	53.44	52.87	52.99				53.44	
10	Queenie Kung Ni Ting	Malaysia	x	50.56	50.40				50.56	
11	Eglė Zarankaitė	Lithuania	x	47.70	49.97				49.97	
12	Despoina Filippidou	Greece	49.51	49.59	x				49.59	
13	Shalini Choudhary	India	x	44.16	44.42				44.42	
14	Mukesh Kumari	India	x	43.13	42.88				43.13	
