= 2013 World Youth Championships in Athletics – Girls' discus throw =

Girls' discus throw at the 2013 World Youth Championships in Athletics
- Venue: RSC Olimpiyskiy
- Dates: 10 July (qualification & final)
- Competitors: 28
- Winning distance: 56.34 CR

Medalists
gold medal	Xie Yuchen	China
silver medal	Claudine Vita	Germany
bronze medal	Liang Xingyun	China

The girls' discus throw at the 2013 World Youth Championships in Athletics was held on 11 July.

== Medalists ==
Gold	Silver	Bronze
Xie Yuchen; China	Claudine Vita; Germany	Liang Xingyun; China

== Records ==
Prior to the competition, the following records were as follows.

World Youth Best	Ilke Wyludda (GDR)	65.86	Neubrandenburg, East Germany	1 August 1986
Championship Record	Ma Xuejun (CHN)	55.26	Debrecen, Hungary	12 July 2001
World Youth Leading	Xie Yuchen (CHN)	54.16	Zhaoqing, China	28 April 2013

== Qualification ==
Qualification rule: 48.50 (Q) or at least 12 best performers (q) qualified.

Rank	Group	Name	Nationality	#1	#2	#3	Result	Notes
1	B	Xie Yuchen	China	52.94			52.94	Q
2	A	Liang Xinyun	China	47.43	49.97		49.97	Q
3	A	Yasenaca Denicaucau	Australia	48.73			48.73	Q, PB
4	A	Claudine Vita	Germany	43.22	47.46	46.10	47.46	q
5	A	Liandri Geel	South Africa	44.80	43.08	46.27	46.27	q
6	A	Lloydricia Cameron	United States	43.99	44.99	x	44.99	q
7	B	Veronika Domjan	Slovenia	44.69	42.58	x	44.69	q
8	B	Amira Sayed	Egypt	42.86	41.63	43.86	43.86	q
9	A	Karyna Cherednychenko	Ukraine	35.09	43.51	x	43.51	q
10	B	Lara Kempka	Germany	40.20	43.05	42.63	43.05	q
11	B	Lenuţa Burueană	Romania	40.93	42.92	42.33	42.92	q
12	B	Vilma Paakkala	Finland	41.27	x	42.76	42.76	q
13	B	Georgie Taylor	Great Britain	42.69	x	x	42.69	
14	A	Paul-Ann Gayle	Jamaica	40.98	42.63	41.84	42.63	
15	B	Ashley Nieuwenhuyzen	South Africa	42.40	x	42.51	42.51	
16	A	Lisa Brix Pedersen	Denmark	42.30	x	41.14	42.30	
17	B	Ashlie Blake	United States	42.02	x	x	42.02	
18	A	Ivana Mužarić	Croatia	41.15	x	41.86	41.86	
19	A	Kim Mi-yeon	South Korea	x	38.10	41.80	41.80	
20	B	Dimitra Zotou	Greece	37.89	x	39.65	39.65	
21	A	Tresna Gustiayu	Indonesia	x	39.33	37.65	39.33	
22	B	Djeneba Touré	Austria	x	39.07	38.84	39.07	
23	A	Živa Gornik	Slovenia	x	38.74	38.81	38.81	
24	A	Vilma Sendriūtė	Lithuania	37.99	38.66	x	38.66	
25	B	Giulia Camporese	Italy	30.18	38.00	x	38.00	
26	B	Kaleigh Cronin	Australia	37.86	36.23	37.78	37.86	
27	B	Micaela Garbarino	Uruguay	35.86	x	37.29	37.29	
28	A	Manpreet Grewal	Canada	x	33.31	36.01	36.01	

== Final ==
Rank	Name	Nationality	#1	#2	#3	#4	#5	#6	Result	Notes
1st place, gold medalist(s)	Xie Yuchen	China	53.24	50.78	55.01	x	54.06	56.34	56.34	CR
2nd place, silver medalist(s)	Claudine Vita	Germany	49.69	50.51	52.59	x	49.37	x	52.59	PB
3rd place, bronze medalist(s)	Liang Xinyun	China	50.65	49.95	51.50	51.38	50.55	43.27	51.50	PB
4	Veronika Domjan	Slovenia	x	40.29	45.58	45.82	47.66	47.60	47.66	
5	Yasenaca Denicaucau	Australia	x	44.86	x	x	x	47.03	47.03	
6	Karyna Cherednychenko	Ukraine	46.89	40.75	46.56	46.02	39.86	x	46.89	PB
7	Liandri Geel	South Africa	46.36	46.38	x	43.52	44.65	45.61	46.38	
8	Lloydricia Cameron	United States	x	43.49	45.36	45.48	37.77	45.16	45.48	
9	Amira Sayed	Egypt	43.66	44.61	43.92				44.61	PB
10	Vilma Paakkala	Finland	41.71	x	43.47				43.47	
11	Lenuţa Burueană	Romania	x	42.82	41.52				42.82	
12	Lara Kempka	Germany	40.15	42.42	x				42.42	
