= Loa Olafsson =

Danish athlete

Personal information
- Full name: Loa Olafsson McNeese
- Born: January 29, 1958
- Height: 1.68 m (5 ft 6 in)
- Weight: 54 kg (119 lb)

Sport
- Sport: Athletics
- Event: 10000 metres

Loa Olafsson McNeese (born 29 January 1958) is a Danish athlete. She recorded world records in the women's 5,000 metres and women's 10,000 metres.

== Athletics Career ==
She recorded two world records in the women's 10,000 metres of 33:34.2 on 19 March 1977 in Hvidovre, Denmark and 31:45.4 on 6 April 1978 in Copenhagen, Denmark. Olafsson also recorded a world record in the 5,000 metres of 15:08.8 on 30 May 1978 in Sollerod, Denmark.

The records are unofficial because the governing body of the sport, the IAAF (now World Athletics), did not list an official world record in these events until 1981, and because it was recorded in a mixed race with men.

As a young athlete, Olafsson won silver in the 1,500 metres at the 1975 European Under 20 Championships.

Olafsson also competed in the 3,000 meters at the 1978 European Championships where she finished 16th. This was the longest distance event for women competitors at this championship.

Olafsson retired from elite competition due to injuries. As of December 2025, Olafsson still held Danish national records in the mile, 3,000 metres and 10,000 metres.
