= National records in the 1500 metres =

The following table is an overview of national records in the 1500 metres.

== Outdoor ==
=== Men ===
Country	Time	Athlete	Date	Place	Ref.
Morocco	3:26.00	Hicham El Guerrouj	14 July 1998	Rome	
Kenya	3:26.34	Bernard Lagat	24 August 2001	Brussels	
Norway	3:26.73	Jakob Ingebrigtsen	12 July 2024	Monaco	
Algeria	3:27.37	Noureddine Morceli	12 July 1995	Nice	
United States	3:27.40 (Note: While Bernard Lagat became a US citizen on 7 May 2004, he still competed for his homeland Kenya at the August 13 to 29, 2004 Summer Olympics. Therefore, at the 2005 USATF annual meeting, his 3:27.40 win in the 1500 meters, on August 6, 2004, in Zurich, was not ratified as an American record. However, in December 2018, the USATF reversed their earlier decision. NACAC, however, has still not ratified this record.)	Bernard Lagat	6 August 2004	Zurich	
France	3:27.49	Azeddine Habz	20 June 2025	Paris	
Great Britain	3:27.62+	Josh Kerr	18 July 2026	London	
Australia	3:28.00	Cameron Myers	28 June 2026	Paris	
Spain	3:28.76	Mohamed Katir	9 July 2021	Monaco	
Bahrain	3:29.14	Rashid Ramzi	14 July 2006	Rome	
Burundi	3:29.18	Vénuste Niyongabo	22 August 1997	Brussels	
Netherlands	3:29.20	Niels Laros	28 August 2025	Zurich	
Portugal	3:29.37	Isaac Nader	24 June 2025	Ostrava	
Ethiopia	3:29.51	Lamecha Girma	30 June 2023	Lausanne	
Djibouti	3:29.58	Ayanleh Souleiman	18 July 2014	Monaco	
New Zealand	3:29.66	Nick Willis	17 July 2015	Monaco	
Germany	3:30.09+	Robert Farken	18 July 2026	London	
Ukraine	3:30.33	Ivan Heshko	3 September 2004	Brussels	
Poland	3:30.42	Marcin Lewandowski	9 July 2021	Monaco	
Ireland	3:30.42	Andrew Coscoran	16 July 2023	Chorzów	
Somalia	3:30.55	Abdi Bile	3 September 1989	Rieti	
Uganda	3:30.58	Ronald Musagala	12 July 2019; 24 August 2019	Monaco; Paris	
Italy	3:30.74	Pietro Arese	6 August 2024	Paris	
Sweden	3:30.87	Samuel Pihlström	6 June 2025	Rome	
Belgium	3:30.99	Ruben Verheyden	20 June 2025	Paris	
Qatar	3:31.04	Daham Najim Bashir	13 May 2005	Doha	
Wales	3:31.08	Jake Heyward	5 August 2022	Birmingham	
Denmark	3:31.17	Robert Kiplagat Andersen	13 August 1997	Zurich	
Turkey	3:31.30	Ilham Tanui Özbilen	19 July 2013	Monaco	
South Africa	3:31.35	Tshepo Tshite	20 June 2025	Paris	
Tunisia	3:31.70	Ali Hakimi	22 August 1997	Brussels	
Canada	3:31.71	Kevin Sullivan	30 June 2000	Rome	
Switzerland	3:31.75	Pierre Délèze	21 August 1985	Zurich	
Sudan	3:31.76	Abubaker Kaki	22 July 2011	Monaco	
Saudi Arabia	3:31.82	Mohammed Shaween	29 May 2011	Hengelo	
Tanzania	3:32.2 h	Filbert Bayi	2 February 1974	Christchurch	
Russia	3:32.28	Vyacheslav Shabunin	30 June 2000	Rome	
Czech Republic	3:32.49	Jakub Holuša	20 July 2018	Monaco	
Luxembourg	3:32.86	Charles Grethen	5 August 2021	Tokyo	
Austria	3:32.96	Raphael Pallitsch	24 June 2025	Ostrava	
Brazil	3:33.25	Hudson Santos de Souza	28 August 2005	Rieti	
Croatia	3:33.30	Branko Zorko	8 August 1998	Monaco	
Romania	3:34.13	Alexandru Vasile	13 June 1997	Bucharest	
Serbia	3:34.20	Elzan Bibić	4 August 2023	Bern	
Israel	3:34.51	Matan Ivri	11 July 2026	Kortrijk	
Andorra	3:34.54	Pol Moya	26 June 2026	Zagreb	
Peru	3:34.67	David Torrence	18 June 2017	Stockholm	
Hungary	3:34.79	Ferenc Kovács	15 June 2025	Portland	
Finland	3:34.89	Santtu Heikkinen	28 June 2026	Troyes	
Cuba	3:35.03	Maury Surel Castillo	7 June 2012	Huelva	
Mexico	3:35.03	Eduardo Herrera	12 July 2025	Los Angeles	
South Sudan	3:35.22	Dominic Lokinyomo Lobalu	4 September 2023	Bellinzona	
India	3:35.24	Jinson Johnson	1 September 2019	Berlin	
Guatemala	3:35.32	Luis Grijalva	18 July 2021	Mission Viejo	
Japan	3:35.42	Kazuki Kawamura	17 July 2021	Chitose	
Puerto Rico	3:35.63	Rob Napolitano	3 June 2021	Portland	
Belarus	3:35.73	Illia Karnavukhau	17 August 2022	Minsk	
Zimbabwe	3:35.76	Phillimon Hanneck	11 August 1991	Grosseto	
Uruguay	3:35.82	Santiago Catrofe	12 June 2021	Nice	
Eritrea	3:35.96	Hais Welday	10 June 2009	Huelva	
South Korea	3:36.01	Lee Jae-ung	16 July 2025	Kitami	
Thailand	3:36.16	Kieran Tuntivate	15 June 2024	Burnaby	
Argentina	3:36.18	Federico Bruno	29 June 2021	Castellón de la Plana	
China	3:36.49	Dou Zhaobo	24 October 2003	Changsha	
Dominica	3:36.60 (Note: Agar ran his personal best of 3:36.36 on 19 July 1998, 3 months after he had changed his allegiance from Dominica to Canada.)	Steve Agar	2 June 1996	Abbotsford	
Greece	3:36.74	Panayotis Stroubakos	24 August 1997	Cologne	
Iran	3:36.92	Amir Zamanpour	9 May 2025	Dubai	
Venezuela	3:36.96	Eduard Villanueva	1 September 2011	Daegu	
Lithuania	3:37.19	Simas Bertašius	26 May 2024	Brussels	
Moldova	3:37.2 h	Anatoliy Mamontov	22 July 1976	Podolsk	
Latvia	3:37.35	Dmitrijs Jurkevičs	28 June 2011	Sollentuna	
Kazakhstan	3:37.54	Vladimir Kalsin	24 June 1984	Kyiv	
Armenia	3:37.80	Yervand Mkrtchyan	4 July 2026	Decines	
Chile	3:37.82	Carlos Díaz	3 June 2016	Huelva	
Albania	3:37.82	David Nikolli	5 September 2021	Padua	
Ecuador	3:37.88	Byron Piedra	25 July 2007	Rio de Janeiro	
Kuwait	3:37.95	Mohammad Al-Azemi	12 June 2013	Dakar	
Egypt	3:38.16	Hamada Mohamed	29 July 2011	Stockholm	
Rwanda	3:38.16	Alexis Sharangabo	29 July 2000	Stanford	
Estonia	3:38.59	Tiidrek Nurme	15 August 2008	Beijing	
Senegal	3:38.88	Mor Seck	15 July 2014	Trento	
Jamaica	3:39.19	Steve Green	28 August 1994	Victoria, BC	
Slovenia	3:39.29	Aleš Tomič	8 July 2002	Zagreb	
Liechtenstein	3:39.34	Günther Hasler	29 July 1976	Montreal	
Bulgaria	3:39.34 (Note: Accepted by World Athletics, but not indicated as national record); 3:39.53	Martin Prodanov; Evgeni Ignatov	15 April 2022; 28 August 1982	Azusa; Sofia	
Slovakia	3:39.4 h 3:39.41	Ivan Kováč; Jozef Lenčéš	30 May 1974; 26 June 1977	Bratislava; Athens	
Mozambique	3:39.41	Flavio Daniel Sehohle	13 April 2013	Stellenbosch	
Cyprus	3:39.50	Amine Khadiri	3 June 2016	Huelva	
Angola	3:39.54	João N'Tyamba	3 August 1992	Barcelona	
Botswana	3:39.60	Glody Dube	24 May 2001	Nijmegen	
Ivory Coast	3:39.60	Siahka Bamba	23 August 2001	Nantes	
Sri Lanka	3:39.61	Chaminda Wijekoon	30 August 2011	Daegu	
Bosnia and Herzegovina	3:39.83	Vinko Pokrajčić	22 July 1981	Bucharest	
Iceland	3:39.90	Baldvin Magnússon	24 July 2024	London	
Ghana	3:40.23	Sampson Laari	2 June 2018	Nashville	
Costa Rica	3:40.25	Juan Diego Castro	15 April 2023	Azusa	
Philippines	3:40.87	Yacine Guermali	14 July 2024	Lignano Sabbiadoro	
Kyrgyzstan	3:41.12	Nursultan Keneshbekov	3 June 2022	Bydgoszcz	
Bermuda	3:41.24	Dage Minors	23 July 2022	Manchester	
Pakistan	3:41.4 h	Muhammad Younis	11 August 1970	Cologne	
Kosovo	3:41.6 h 3:44.02	Ismet Abazi; Musa Hajdari	11 June 1975; 27 July 2019	Belgrade; Skopje	
Panama	3:41.73	Donaldo Arza	8 September 1972	Munich	
Colombia	3:41.99	Carlos San Martín	14 June 2023	Castellón	
Congo DR	3:42.02	Patrick Tambwé	5 July 2001	Reims	
Zambia	3:42.09	Tonny Wamulwa	3 June 2012	Orvieto	
Libya	3:42.11	Aboubaker El-Gatrouni	27 May 2012	Rabat	
Congo Republic	3:42.11	Alex Ngouari-Mouissi	19 June 2024	Bordeaux	
Georgia	3:42.4 h	Mikhail Shapovalov	28 July 1979	Moscow	
Turkmenistan	3:42.48	Rashid Kayumov	27 July 1982	Kyiv	
Iraq	3:42.50	Adnan Almntfage	29 September 2014	Incheon	
Malawi	3:42.73	Chauncy Makolani Master	11 June 2008	Avellino	
Fiji	3:42.81	Richard Kermode	13 February 1982	Auckland	
Nigeria	3:42.85	Ado Maude	19 July 1991	Cesenatico	
Dominican Republic	3:43.57; 3:43.09 i	Isidro Pimentel; Matthew Payamps	30 March 2002	Stanford; Boston	
Gabon	3:43.58	Jean-Marc Léandro	30 July 1999	Niort	
Bolivia	3:43.60	David Ninavia	1 July 2022	Valledupar	
Azerbaijan	3:43.7 h	Boris Kutukov	22 April 1979	Baku	
Guyana	3:43.81	Quamel Prince	13 April 2019	Fairfax	
Gibraltar	3:43.84	Harvey Dixon	14 April 2018	Gold Coast	
Uzbekistan	3:44.0 h	Ilshat Kalimuddin	30 July 1987	Chelyabinsk	
Lebanon	3:44.11	Munir Kabbara	15 April 2022	Azusa	
Malta	3:44.48	Jared Micallef	1 June 2023	Marsa	
Tajikistan	3:44.51	Yevgeniy Stakanov	24 June 2004	Tula, Russia	
Madagascar	3:44.80	Edouard Rasoanaivo	13 January 1973	Lagos	
Eswatini	3:44.89	Sipho Dlamini	7 April 1995	Knoxville	
Jordan	3:45.0 h	Jihad Al-Balawi	7 September 1992	Latakia	
Trinidad and Tobago	3:45.09	Sheldon Monderoy	26 July 1998	Lahti	
Chinese Taipei	3:45.26	Chien Tzu-Chieh	25 July 2025	Hiroshima	
Vietnam	3:45.31	Nguyễn Đình Cương	11 December 2007	Nakhon Ratchasima	
Palestine	3:45.32	Wesam Al-Massri	28 September 2014	Incheon	
Namibia	3:45.35	Reinholdt Iita	5 June 1998	Kotka	
Malaysia	3:45.70	Mahendran Vadivellan	11 December 2007	Nakhon Ratchasima	
Bahamas	3:45.72	William Johnson	17 May 1983	Austin	
Cape Verde	3:45.94	Samuel Freire	24 June 2017	Bilbao	
Haiti	3:45.96; 3:45.54 #	Moise Joseph	21 July 2009; 12 May 2002	Ghent; Starkville	
North Korea	3:46.0 h	Kang Hyong-Man	20 October 1963	Pyongyang	
Cayman Islands	3:46.09	Jon Rankin	15 July 2011	Mayagüez	
Equatorial Guinea	3:46.14	Benjamín Enzema	14 July 2018	Kortrijk	
Saint Vincent	3:46.20	Nicol-Samuel Delohnni	19 June 2016	London	
Indonesia	3:46.21	Julius Leuwol	24 September 1995	Jakarta	
Mauritius	3:46.22	Mohammed Dookun	2 April 2016	Réduit	
Nepal	3:46.38	Siddhant Adhikari	29 April 2016	New Delhi	
British Virgin Islands	3:46.47	Greg Rhymer	21 May 1994	Athens	
North Macedonia	3:46.6 h 3:44.98 i 3:47.13	Sotir Gavrilovski; Dario Ivanovski; Dario Ivanovski	27 June 1970; 31 January 2021; 29 June 2018	Belgrade; Belgrade; Tarragona	
Cameroon	3:46.75	Hamadjam Soudi	3 June 2014	Warri	
Oman	3:46.88	Husain Mohsin al-Farsi	11 June 2012	Doha	
Comoros	3:46.96	Mohamed Ahmed	5 June 1996	Marseille	
United Arab Emirates	3:47.06	Mohamed Ahmed Amer	19 August 1992	Dortmund	
Lesotho	3:47.36	Moses Moeketsi Mosuhli	24 March 2006	Melbourne	
U.S. Virgin Islands	3:47.75	Billy Bohlke	April 13, 2002	Tempe	
Chad	3:47.8 h	Ahmed Issa	22 July 1965	Brazzaville	
Barbados	3:47.82	Leo Garnes	4 April 1991	Austin	
Myanmar	3:47.83	Shwe Aung	13 June 1993	Singapore	
Central African Republic	3:48.07	Arnold Gabin Kangai	8 June 2005	Saint-Maur-des-Fossés	
Syria	3:48.12	Mahmoud Kheirat	30 June 1999	Beirut	
Saint Lucia	3:48.50	Zepherinus Joseph	31 March 2001	Gainesville	
Paraguay	3:48.74	Ramon López	19 September 1988	Seoul	
Antigua and Barbuda	3:49.41	Dale Jones	19 September 1988	Seoul	
Gambia	3:49.59	Omar Jammeh	4 August 2021	Pfungstadt	
Nicaragua	3:49.64	Eric Rodriguez	27 August 2015	Beijing	
Mongolia	3:49.7 h	Davaajav Ganbold	1 June 1980	Ulaanbaatar	
Yemen	3:49.70	Mohamed Mamoun Al-Rajah	9 April 2019	Doha	
Samoa	3:50.24	Aunese Curreen	30 March 2008	Auckland	
Mauritania	3:50.25; 3:48.86	Mohamed Elbendir	6 July 2005; 4 February 2006	Salamanca; Zaragoza	
New Caledonia	3:50.27	Alain Lazare	14 December 1987	Nouméa	
Grenada	3:50.3 h	Donald Pierre	19 March 1972	Pointe-à-Pierre	
Bangladesh	3:50.46	Ahmed Mustaque	23 November 1987	Calcutta	
Timor-Leste	3:51.03	Felisberto de Deus	3 August 2021	Tokyo	
Mali	3:51.2 h	Moussa Camara	12 July 2014	Bamako	
San Marino	3:51.30	Joe Guerra	2 June 2018	Nashville	
French Polynesia	3:51.36	Charles Delys	30 August 2011	Daegu	
Singapore	3:51.51	Lui Yuan Chow	20 December 2018	Melbourne	
Guinea	3:51.96	Mohamed Malal Sy Savané	1 August 1992	Barcelona	
El Salvador	3:52.12	Aarón Hernández	6 July 2023	San Salvador	
Guam	3:52.24	Brent Butler	24 May 1997	Edwardsville	
Sierra Leone	3:52.29	Victor Sesay	11 January 1973	Lagos	
Seychelles	3:52.46	Ronny Marie	5 May 2001	Victoria	
Niger	3:52.55	Adamou Dogo	13 April 2008	Bamako	
Hong Kong	3:52.67	Khan Mohammad Kamran	17 November 2025	Guangzhou	
Netherlands Antilles	3:53.0 h	Richard Riley	16 September 1973	Papendal	
Burkina Faso	3:53.15	Jean-Bernard Yaro	12 July 1995	Ouagadougou	
Togo	3:53.78	Makman Yoagbati	26 August 2022	Lomé	
Monaco	3:53.94	Brice Etès	27 September 2020	Vénissieux	
Aruba	3:54.01	Asher Patel	4 April 2025	Philadelphia	
Benin	3:54.08	Sylvain Azonhin	29 May 2021	Zaria	
Montenegro	3:55.8 h	Muhamed Bardić	2 July 1989	Belgrade	
Suriname	3:55.69	Tommy Asinga	12 May 1991	Ann Arbor	
Belize	3:56.35	Adrian Jorgenson	23 May 1998	Richmond	
Cook Islands	3:56.88	Alex Beddoes	30 November 2023	Honiara	
Maldives	3:57.44	Hussain Fazeel Haroon	18 June 2023	Bhubaneswar	
Brunei	3:57.51	Jimmy Anak Ahar	17 May 2005	Darwin	
Saint Kitts and Nevis	3:57.67	Masai Jeffers	3 July 2016	Road Town	
Vanuatu	3:58.28	Tawai Keiruan	16 December 1993	Port Vila	
Papua New Guinea	3:59.02	Aquila Turalom	30 November 2023	Honiara	
Honduras	3:59.2 h 3:58.56 i	Jorge Ponce; Elvin Canales	28 June 1986; 11 January 2020	Debrecen; Sabadell	
Cambodia	3:59.97	Chhun Bunthorn	30 September 2023	Hangzhou	
Guinea-Bissau	4:00.41	Alfaba Bah	8 June 2007	Uster	
Solomon Islands	4:00.95	Selwyn Kole	20 August 1997	Tafuna	
Afghanistan	4:00.98	Sebghatullah Ismaili	23 August 2020	Frauenfeld	
Liberia	4:01.56	Bill Rogers	27 June 2004	Cotonou	
Turks and Caicos	4:02.0 h	Idi Gardiner	20 March 1996	Cockburn Town	
São Tomé and Príncipe	4:02.3 h	António Cadio Paraiso	2 January 1984	Luanda	
Tonga	4:03.1 h	Tui'ese Ngaluafe	28 April 1979	Nuku'alofa	
Laos	4:04.82	Khambieng Khamiar	3 August 1992	Barcelona	
Macau	4:04.99	Seng Tou Ip	1 April 2023	Hong Kong	
Wallis and Futuna	4:08.1 h	Angélo Pétélo	22 August 1987	Sydney	
Bhutan	4:08.09	Lungten Tshering	15 June 2004	Ipoh	
Tuvalu	4:12.7 h	Filemu	2011	Tuvalu	
Anguilla	4:18.0 h	Nigel Richardson	5 July 1984	St. John's	
Micronesia	4:19.1 h	Elias Rodriguez	11 July 1990	San Antonio, Saipan	
American Samoa	4:19.65	Jezmond Papu	23 April 2011	Pago Pago	
Palau	4:20.11	Douglas Schmidt	5 September 2007	Apia	
Montserrat	4:21.1 h	Cardinal Maynard	9 July 1977	Road Town	
Northern Mariana Islands	4:25.1 h	Joseph Gildilak	1 April 1994	Mangilao	
Norfolk Island	4:28.05	Ben Wieczorek	13 July 2004	Grosseto	
Nauru	4:29.8 h	Gemenoa Joramm	2 September 1963	Suva	
Kiribati	4:32.4 h	Kautu Rabangaki	2 September 1963	Suva	
Marshall Islands	4:36.0 h	Lani Mejbon	30 July 1999	Majuro	
Niue	4:43.08	John Malcolm	11 September 1983	Apia	

=== Women ===
Country	Time	Athlete	Date	Place	Ref.
Kenya	3:49.04	Faith Kipyegon	7 July 2024	Paris	
Ethiopia	3:50.07	Genzebe Dibaba	17 July 2015	Monaco	
China	3:50.46	Yunxia Qu	11 September 1993	Beijing	
Australia	3:50.83	Jessica Hull	7 July 2024	Paris	
Netherlands	3:51.95	Sifan Hassan	5 October 2019	Doha	
Russia	3:52.47	Tatyana Kazankina	13 August 1980	Zurich	
Great Britain	3:52.61	Georgia Bell	10 August 2024	Paris-St-Denis	
Romania	3:53.96	Paula Ivan	1 October 1988	Seoul	
United States	3:54.99	Shelby Houlihan	5 October 2019	Doha	
Algeria	3:55.30	Hassiba Boulmerka	8 August 1992	Barcelona	
Turkey	3:55.33	Süreyya Ayhan-Kop	5 September 2003	Brussels	
Ireland	3:55.87	Ciara Mageean	8 September 2023	Brussels	
Canada	3:56.12	Gabriela DeBues-Stafford	5 October 2019	Doha	
Uzbekistan	3:56.14	Zamira Zaytseva	27 July 1982	Kyiv	
Bahrain	3:56.18	Maryam Yusuf Jamal	27 August 2006	Rieti	
France	3:56.24	Agathe Guillemot	28 June 2026	Paris	
Sweden	3:56.60	Abeba Aregawi	10 May 2013	Doha	
Ukraine	3:56.63; 3:56.50 (Note: Not a national record as Pozdnyakova moved only in 1984 to Ukraine.)	Nadezhda Ralldugina; Tetyana Pozdnyakova	18 August 1984; 27 July 1982	Prague; Kyiv	
Moldova	3:57.05	Svetlana Guskova	27 July 1982	Kyiv	
Poland	3:57.31	Weronika Lizakowska	8 August 2024	Paris-St-Denis	
Germany	3:57.71	Christiane Wartenberg	1 August 1980	Moscow	
Portugal	3:57.71	Carla Sacramento	8 August 1998	Monaco	
Spain	3:57.75	Marta Pérez	8 August 2024	Paris-St-Denis	
Italy	3:58.11	Sintayehu Vissa	8 August 2024	Paris-St-Denis	
Switzerland	3:58.20	Anita Weyermann	8 August 1998	Monaco	
Belarus	3:58.40	Ravilya Agletdinova	18 August 1985	Moscow	
Jamaica	3:58.77	Adelle Tracey	20 August 2023	Budapest	
Morocco	3:58.84	Rababe Arafi	16 June 2019	Rabat	
Bulgaria	3:59.10	Daniela Yordanova	28 August 2004	Athens	
Japan	3:59.19	Nozomi Tanaka	4 August 2021	Tokyo	
Uganda	3:59.56	Winnie Nanyondo	16 June 2019	Rabat	
Lithuania	3:59.74	Gabija Galvydytė	16 May 2026	Shaoxing	
South Africa	3:59.92	Caster Semenya	4 May 2018	Doha	
Norway	4:00.55	Grete Waitz	3 September 1978	Prague	
Czech Republic	4:01.23	Kristina Mäki	4 August 2021	Tokyo	
Hungary	4:01.26	Judit Varga	16 August 2002	Zurich	
Belgium	4:01.26	Elise Vanderelst	14 September 2024	Brussels	
Mozambique	4:01.50	Maria de Lurdes Mutola	12 July 2002	Rome	
Slovenia	4:02.13	Sonja Roman	10 July 2009	Rome	
New Zealand	4:02.20	Maia Ramsden	8 August 2024	Paris-St-Denis	
Finland	4:02.35	Sara Kuivisto	4 August 2021	Tokyo	
Albania	4:02.63	Luiza Gega	15 May 2015	Doha	
Slovakia	4:02.99	Lucia Klocová	8 August 2012	London	
Austria	4:03.02	Theresia Kiesl	3 August 1996	Atlanta	
Mexico	4:03.06	Laura Galván	12 August 2023	Manchester	
Tunisia	4:03.51	Marwa Bouzayani	9 August 2025	Oordegem	
United Arab Emirates	4:03.70	Betlhem Desalegn	18 May 2016	Beijing	
Serbia	4:04.77	Amela Terzić	12 July 2015	Tallinn	
India	4:04.78	K. M. Deeksha	11 May 2024	Los Angeles	
Eritrea	4:05.11	Meraf Bahta (Note: Bahta ran a personal best time of 4:00.49 in 2017, but she transferred to Sweden in January 2024)	13 July 2013	Heusden-Zolder	
Namibia	4:05.30	Agnes Samaria	29 July 2008	Monaco	
Denmark	4:05.34	Sofia Thøgersen	19 August 2023	Budapest	
Argentina	4:05.50	Micaela Levaggi	4 July 2026	Ordizia	
Luxembourg	4:05.58	Vera Bertemes-Hoffmann	5 July 2025	Poznań	
Greece	4:05.63	Konstantina Efentaki	17 July 2004	Madrid	
Suriname	4:05.67	Letitia Vriesde	31 August 1991	Tokyo	
Venezuela	4:05.78	Joselyn Brea	31 May 2024	Atlanta	
Kyrgyzstan	4:05.89	Lyudmila Derevyankina	2 August 1988	Kyiv	
Tajikistan	4:06.42	Alla Libutina	26 July 1982	Kyiv	
Iceland	4:06.43	Aníta Hinriksdóttir	11 June 2017	Hengelo	
Colombia	4:06.99	Muriel Coneo	3 June 2016	Huelva	
Brazil	4:07.30	Juliana Paula dos Santos	5 June 2010	San Fernando	
Zimbabwe	4:07.82	Julia Sakara	21 September 1998	Kuala Lumpur	
Uruguay	4:07.90	María Pía Fernández	22 May 2024	Nerja	
Rwanda	4:08.75	Beatha Nishimwe	24 June 2016	Durban	
Sri Lanka	4:09.12	Gayanthika Artigala	30 October 2021	Colombo	
Croatia	4:09.14	Slobodanka Čolović	21 July 1987	Celje	
Israel	4:09.36	Sivan Auerbach	26 May 2024	Brussels	
Cuba	4:09.57	Adriana Muñoz	7 August 2003	Santo Domingo	
Vietnam	4:09.58	Truong Thanh Hang	23 November 2010	Guangzhou	
Tanzania	4:09.71	Anna Ndege	6 July 2002	Cork	
Latvia	4:09.8 h	Rita Vilciņa	8 June 1979	Sochi	
Puerto Rico	4:09.92	Beverly Ramos	1 July 2011	Burnaby	
Kazakhstan	4:10.26	Galina Reznikova	22 June 1983	Moscow	
Bermuda	4:10.48	Ashley Couper	21 March 2006	Melbourne	
Chile	4:10.76	Josefa Quezada	26 May 2024	Brussels	
Cyprus	4:10.98	Natalia Evangelidou	9 April 2018	Gold Coast	
Estonia	4:11.44	Liina Tšernov	19 June 2016	Brussels	
Botswana	4:11.50 A	Oratile Nowe	15 February 2025	Pretoria	
Sudan	4:12.01; 4:08.49 X	Ehsan Gibril Arbab	4 or 5 June 2011; 8 May 2009	Dar Es Salaam; Doha	
Bosnia and Herzegovina	4:12.19	Marica Mršić	14 June 1983	Nova Gorica	
Myanmar	4:12.21	Khin Khin Htwe	29 August 1991	Tokyo	
Peru	4:12.33	Anita Poma	12 May 2024	Cuiabá	
Djibouti	4:12.53	Zourah Ali	17 March 2023	Djibouti City	
Georgia	4:12.6 h	Elena Shapavalova	1 July 1983	Moscow	
Malta	4:12.64	Gina McNamara	14 July 2023	Langley	
Trinidad and Tobago	4:13.21	Pilar McShine	27 July 2013	Ninove	
Cameroon	4:13.57	Florence Djépé	3 July 2003	Bron	
Ecuador	4:14.08	Carmen Alder Caisalitin	15 April 2023	Azusa	
South Korea	4:14.18	Lee Mi-Kyoung	20 September 1992	Seoul	
Cayman Islands	4:14.48	Michele Bush-Cuke	3 June 1983	Houston	
Saint Vincent and the Grenadines	4:14.60	Shafiqua Maloney	19 April 2024	Fayetteville	
Kosovo	4:14.74	Gresa Bakraçi		20 May 2026	Nerja
North Korea	4:14.76	Choi Ok-Son	13 May 1993	Shanghai	
Madagascar	4:15.13	Eliane Saholinirina	29 May 2016	Oordegem	
Panama	4:15.22	Andrea Ferris	26 November 2013	Trujillo	
Azerbaijan	4:15.72	Gezashign Safarova	24 July 2009	Novi Sad	
Cape Verde	4:16.06	Carla Mendes	20 June 2019	Huelva	
Bolivia	4:16.64	Niusha Mancilla	7 June 2003	Seville	
Zambia	4:16.8 hA	Evelyn Musonda	18 August 1990	Luanshya	
Liechtenstein	4:16.2 + (Note: Intermediate time achieved in a mile race.); 4:17.01	Helen Ritter	26 January 1980; 12 July 1980	Auckland; Stuttgart	
Nigeria	4:17.1 h	Victoria Moradeyo	29 July 1999	Lagos	
Guatemala	4:17.24	Viviana Aroche	2 June 2023	Pamplona	
Lesotho	4:17.31	Tsepang Sello	23 February 2018	Bloemfontein	
Angola	4:17.35	Neide Dias	29 June 2019	Braga	
Ghana	4:17.75	Agnes Abu	21 April 2017	Auburn	
Guyana	4:17.91	Marian Burnett	27 July 2007	Rio de Janeiro	
Jordan	4:18.25	Tamara Armoush	24 June 2017	Watford	
El Salvador	4:18.26	Gladis Landaverde	6 August 2012	London	
Indonesia	4:18.69	Rini Budiarti	9 August 2007	Bangkok	
Dominican Republic	4:18.72	María Mancebo	12 May 2012	Ponce	
Mauritius	4:19.59	Josiane Nairac-Boullé	30 August 1988	Annaba	
Burundi	4:19.90 A 4:11.6+IRM	Francine Niyomukunzi; Francine Niyonsaba	26 July 2019; 8 August 2021	Kampala; Paris	
Senegal	4:20.03	Raïssa Laval	26 June 2016	Angers	
Palestine	4:20.05	Layla Almasri	1 June 2024	Murfreesboro	
Benin	4:20.09	Noélie Yarigo	23 June 2018	Blois	
San Marino	4:20.27	Elisa Vagnini	9 July 1998	Rome	
Congo Republic	4:21.60	Léontine Tsiba	22 August 1998	Dakar	
Thailand	4:22.58	Sasithorn Chantanuhong	10 December 1985	Bangkok	
Chad	4:22.62+	Fraïda Hassanatte	11 June 2022	Milan	
Chinese Taipei	4:22.8 h	Lee Chiu-hsia	17 May 1975	Bakersfield	
Armenia	4:22.8 h	Lyudmila Artyomova	12 July 1976	Moscow	
Grenada	4:23.00	Neisha Bernard-Thomas	13 June 2009	Waltham	
Malaysia	4:23.49	Jayanthi Palaniappan	14 September 1993	New Delhi	
Iraq	4:23.5 h	Maysa Matrood	15 May 1995	Baghdad	
Barbados	4:25.61	Sade Sealy	22 February 2020	Bridgetown	
Antigua and Barbuda	4:27.51	Janil Williams	19 July 2000	Montreal	
Mongolia	4:28.41	Chuluunkhuu Shinetsetseg	1 October 2023	Hangzhou	
Belize	4:29.29	Sharette Garcia	17 April 1992	Walnut	
Pakistan	4:31.41	Sumaira Zahoor	5 April 2004	Islamabad	
South Sudan	4:31.65	Anjelina Lohalith	2 August 2021	Tokyo	
Kuwait	4:32.31; 4:29.62 i	Amal al-Roumi	2 June 2023; 11 February 2023	Ninove; Nur-Sultan	
Central African Republic	4:33.57	Brigitte Nganaye	5 August 1992	Barcelona	
Andorra	4:35.19	Aina Cinca Bons	1 June 2024	Mataró	
U.S. Virgin Islands	4:35.43	Rachel Conhoff	8 May 2022	Collegeville	
Bahamas	4:36.37	Jennaya Hield	6 May 2017	Greensboro	
Burkina Faso	4:37.72	Samatou Tindé	4 June 2024	Accra	
Honduras	4:38.77	Magda Castillo	23 April 2004	Havana	
Saint Lucia	4:39.38	Nessa Paul	5 May 2006	Bloomington	
Turks and Caicos Islands	4:46.03	Rebecca Bernadin	22 April 2022	Tuscaloosa	
Gibraltar	4:47.0 h	Kim Baglietto	3 October 2008	Gibraltar	
Bangladesh	4:50.3 h	Rawshanara Putul	3 April 2009	Dhaka	
British Virgin Islands	4:50.50	Lakeisha Warner	20 March 2012	Road Town	
Solomon Islands	4:52.63	Sharon Firisua	31 October 2015	Melbourne	
Macau	4:52.92	Hoi Long	27 November 2010	Macau	
Aruba	4:53.84	Emma Gobert	4 April 2026	St. George’s	
Samoa	5:25.3 h	Mele Steiner	12 February 1983	Napier	
Afghanistan	5:27.35	Mehrangiz Bijanpoor	3 June 2007	Asker	
Saudi Arabia	5:30.51	Sarah Attar	10 March 2012	Fullerton	
Montserrat	5:48.3 h	Magdalena O'Brien	9 July 1977	Road Town	

== Indoor ==
=== Men ===
Country	Time	Athlete	Date	Place	Ref.
Norway	3:29.63+	Jakob Ingebrigtsen	13 February 2025	Liévin	
Ethiopia	3:31.04	Samuel Tefera	16 February 2019	Birmingham	
Morocco	3:31.18	Hicham El Guerrouj	2 February 1997	Stuttgart	
Kenya	3:32.11	Laban Rotich	1 February 1998	Stuttgart	
France	3:32.24+	Azzedine Habz	8 February 2025	New York City	
Australia	3:32.35	Oliver Hoare	13 February 2021	Staten Island	
Great Britain	3:32.48	Neil Gourley	25 February 2023	Birmingham	
Netherlands	3:32.68	Samuel Chapple	22 February 2026	Toruń	
Ireland	3:33.09	Andrew Coscoran	19 February 2026	Liévin	
Germany	3:33.14+	Robert Farken	8 February 2025	New York City	
Burundi	3:33.17	Vénuste Niyongabo	22 February 1998	Liévin	
United States	3:33.22 +	Yared Nuguse	11 February 2023	New York City	
Spain	3:33.28	Adel Mechaal	25 February 2023	Birmingham	
Belgium	3:33.32+	Pieter Sisk	31 January 2026	Boston	
Canada	3:33.39	Foster Malleck	22 February 2026	Boston	
Sweden	3:33.47	Samuel Pihlström	22 February 2026	Toruń	
Ukraine	3:33.99	Ivan Heshko	13 February 2005	Karlsruhe	
Algeria	3:34.16	Noureddine Morceli	28 February 1991	Seville	
Portugal	3:34.23	Isaac Nader	30 January 2024	Ostrava	
New Zealand	3:34.72	Sam Tanner	13 February 2021	Staten Island	
Turkey	3:34.76	Ilham Tanui Özbilen	12 February 2012	Karlsruhe	
South Africa	3:35.06	Tshepo Tshite	6 February 2024	Toruń	
Djibouti	3:35.2 h 3:35.39	Ayanleh Souleiman	6 February 2014; 13 February 2018	Stockholm; Liévin	
Uruguay	3:35.50	Valentín Soca	19 February 2026	Liévin	
Italy	3:35.63	Ossama Meslek	6 February 2024	Toruń	
Poland	3:35.71	Marcin Lewandowski	17 February 2021	Toruń	
Luxembourg	3:35.99	Charles Grethen	3 February 2024	Boston	
Bahrain	3:36.28	Belal Mansoor Ali	20 February 2007	Stockholm	
Qatar	3:36.35	Mohamad Algarni	20 February 2016	Doha	
Czech Republic	3:36.53	Filip Sasínek	17 February 2021	Toruń	
Russia	3:36.68	Vyacheslav Shabunin	22 February 1998	Liévin	
Mexico	3:37.07+	Eduardo Herrera	22 February 2026	Boston	
Puerto Rico	3:37.33	Rob Napolitano	9 February 2024	Boston	
Austria	3:37.36	Raphael Pallitsch	30 January 2024	Ostrava	
Tunisia	3:37.50	Ali Hakimi	14 February 1997	Karlsruhe	
Hungary	3:37.55	István Szögi	30 January 2021	Vienna	
Serbia	3:37.84	Elzan Bibić	7 March 2022	Belgrade	
Argentina	3:38.03	Federico Bruno	8 February 2022	Sabadell	
Croatia	3:38.05	Branko Zorko	2 February 1997	Stuttgart	
Armenia	3:38.12	Yervand Mkrtchyan	13 February 2024	Belgrade	
Finland	3:38.16	Antti Loikkanen	12 March 1978	Milan	
Lithuania	3:38.32	Simas Bertašius	3 February 2022	Ostrava	
Andorra	3:38.37	Pol Moya	18 January 2026	Kirchberg	
Belarus	3:38.47	Illia Karnavukhau	3 February 2022	Ostrava	
Denmark	3:38.47+	Kristian Uldbjerg Hansen	8 February 2025	Boston	
Somalia	3:38.50	Abdi Bile	16 February 1986	Fairfax	
Switzerland	3:38.86	Peter Philipp	4 February 2001	Stuttgart	
Eritrea	3:39.09	Yobiel Weldrufael	13 February 2024	Belgrade	
Japan	3:39.12	Ryoma Aoki	9 February 2024	Boston	
Brazil	3:39.13	Thiago André	8 February 2020	Toruń	
Uganda	3:39.14	Julius Achon	9 March 2001	Lisbon	
Albania	3:39.18	David Nikolli	5 February 2023	Padua	
Greece	3:39.63	Panayotis Papoulias	1 February 1998	Piraeus	
Thailand	3:39.69 +	Kieran Tuntivate	14 February 2025	Boston	
Peru	3:39.79	David Torrence	4 February 2017	Karlsruhe	
Tanzania	3:40.3 h+	Filbert Bayi	22 February 1980	San Diego	
Romania	3:40.30	Ioan Zăizan	28 January 2014	Vienna	
Jamaica	3:40.7 h	Byron Dyce	8 February 1974	New York City	
Iceland	3:41.05	Baldvin Magnússon	4 February 2024	Reykjavík	
Moldova	3:41.1 h	Anatoliy Mamontov	12 March 1978	Milan	
Guatemala	3:41.11	Luis Grijalva	11 February 2022	Spokane	
India	3:41.18	Chatholi Hamza	15 February 2008	Doha	
Bulgaria	3:41.7 h	Yevgeni Ignatov	8 February 1981	Sofia	
Sudan	3:42.21; 3:39.40 X	Osman Yahya	7 February 2009; 15 February 2009	Stuttgart; Karlsruhe	
Chile	3:42.23; 3:39.39 X	Carlos Díaz; Iván Guido López	7 February 2016; 19 February 2016	Sabadell; Sabadell	
Senegal	3:42.29	Mor Seck	22 January 2012	Ancona	
Dominica	3:42.34	Steve Agar	1 March 1997	Sindelfingen	
Slovakia	3:42.5 h	Jozef Lenčéš	2 March 1977	Bratislava	
Cyprus	3:42.58	Christos Papapetrou	1 February 1998	Piraeus	
Latvia	3:42.84	Dmitrijs Jurkevičs	7 March 2015	Prague	
Cuba	3:43.06 (Note: Not recognized by the Cuban Federation)	Mauris Surel Castillo	19 January 2013	Antequera	
Dominican Republic	3:43.09	Matthew Payamps	3 February 2024	Boston	
Slovenia	3:43.22	Mitja Krevs	7 March 2014	Sopot	
Iran	3:43.37	Amir Zamanpour	21 March 2025	Nanjing	
China	3:43.40	Dezhu Liu	15 March 2023	Tianjin	
Estonia	3:43.64	Deniss Šalkauskas	13 February 2026	Erfurt	
Botswana	3:44.33	Mbiganyi Thee	6 March 1987	Indianapolis	
Iraq	3:44.38	Adnan Taess Akkar	18 February 2009	Stockholm	
Zimbabwe	3:44.43	Tapfumaneyi Jonga (Note: Jonga ran another 1500 m indoors in 1987 with a faster time of 3:41.82, but this has not been recognized by the federation)	6 March 1987	Indianapolis	
Kyrgyzstan	3:44.75	Nursultan Keneshbekov	8 February 2026	Tianjin	
North Macedonia	3:44.98	Dario Ivanovski	31 January 2021	Belgrade	
Kazakhstan	3:45.15	Vladimir Kalsin	12 February 1982	Moscow	
Haiti	3:45.93	Moise Joseph	22 January 2011	New York	
Zambia	3:46.01	Jordan Chipangama	10 March 2006	Moscow	
Bosnia and Herzegovina	3:46.2 h	Vinko Pokrajčić	25 February 1979	Vienna	
Kuwait	3:46.69	Omar Awadh Al-Rashidi	2 November 2009	Hanoi	
Angola	3:46.48	Tulio António	21 February 2009	Pombal	
Israel	3:47.85	Itai Maggidi	25 February 2005	Clemson	
Saudi Arabia	3:48.73; 3:45.12 X	Fayez Abdullah Al Subaie; Mohammed Shaween	1 Marcvh 2024; 9 March 2012	Glasgow; Istanbul	
South Sudan	3:48.82	Abraham Guem	19 March 2022	Belgrade	
Mauritania	3:48.86	Mohamed Elbendir	4 February 2006	Zaragoza	
Gibraltar	3:49.89	Harvey Dixon	3 March 2018	Birmingham	
Venezuela	3:50.20	Miguel Angel García Pérez	1 March 2003	Valencia	
Bolivia	3:51.20 A	David Ninavia	28 February 2026	Cochabamba	
Lebanon	3:53.60	Peter Alkhoury	7 February 2021	Istanbul	
Colombia	3:54.06 A	Dylan Carrasco	28 February 2026	Cochabamba	
Gambia	3:54.39	Omar Jammeh	2 February 2019	Karlsruhe	
United Arab Emirates	3:54.77	Saud Al-Zaabi	12 February 2019	Ostrava	
Seychelles	3:56.24	Gaylord Silly	27 January 2019	Bordeaux	
Honduras	3:58.56	Elvin Canales	10 January 2020	Sabadell	
Ghana	3:58.65 y (Note: by World Athletics source; 3:58.75 by other sources)	Sampson Laari	26 February 2017	Boston	
Hong Kong	4:00.63	Sebastian Sutch	8 February 2025	Boston	
Pakistan	4:02.36	Sohail Amir	6 February 2026	Tianjin	
Chinese Taipei	4:02.68	Chen Fu-pin	8 February 2004	Tehran	
Afghanistan	4:07.14	Dost Mohammed Sultani	12 February 2015	Sandnes	
Macau	4:14.11	Lei Chi Keong	11 February 2007	Macau	
Malaysia	4:16.54	Mohd Jironi Riduan	26 February 2010	Tehran	
Bahamas	4:24.15 y	Andre Colebrook	10 January 2014	New York City	

=== Women ===
Country	Time	Athlete	Date	Place	Ref.
Ethiopia	3:53.09	Gudaf Tsegay	9 February 2021	Liévin	
Sweden	3:57.91	Abeba Aregawi	6 February 2014	Stockholm	
Russia	3:58.28	Yelena Soboleva	18 February 2006	Moscow	
Great Britain	3:58.53	Georgia Hunter Bell	22 March 2026	Toruń	
Australia	3:59.45	Jessica Hull	22 March 2026	Toruń	
Bahrain	3:59.79	Maryam Yusuf Jamal	9 March 2008	Valencia	
Germany	3:59.87 +	Konstanze Klosterhalfen	8 February 2020	New York City	
United States	3:59.98	Regina Jacobs	1 February 2003	Boston	
Romania	4:00.27 +	Doina Melinte	9 February 1990	East Rutherford	
Netherlands	4:00.46	Sifan Hassan	19 February 2015	Stockholm	
Canada	4:00.80 +	Gabriela DeBues-Stafford	8 February 2020	New York City	
Kenya	4:01.17	Beatrice Chepkoech	6 February 2024	Toruń	
Ireland	4:01.62	Sarah Healy	15 February 2025	Birmingham	
Spain	4:01.77	Nuria Fernández	14 February 2009	Valencia	
Morocco	4:02.46	Rababe Arafi	8 February 2020	Toruń	
Uganda	4:02.78	Halimah Nakaayi	6 February 2024	Toruń	
Poland	4:03.58	Lidia Chojecka	21 February 2003	Birmingham	
Italy	4:04.01	Gabriella Dorio	7 March 1982	Milan	
Portugal	4:04.11	Carla Sacramento	25 February 2001	Liévin	
Bulgaria	4:04.19	Daniela Yordanova	9 March 2008	Valencia	
Belarus	4:04.42	Alesia Turava	12 February 2004	Stockholm	
France	4:04.64	Agathe Guillemot	10 February 2024	Liévin	
Jamaica	4:04.95	Aisha Praught-Leer	10 February 2018	Boston	
Slovenia	4:05.44	Jolanda Čeplak	9 March 2002	Glasgow	
Turkey	4:05.66+	Şilan Ayyildiz	15 February 2025	Boston	
Belgium	4:05.71	Elise Vanderelst	9 February 2021	Liévin	
Czech Republic	4:05.73	Simona Vrzalová	12 February 2019	Ostrava	
Hungary	4:06.04	Judit Varga	15 February 2004	Karlsruhe	
Finland	4:06.14	Sara Kuivisto	22 February 2022	Toruń	
New Zealand	4:06.51	Maia Ramsden	1 March 2024	Glasgow	
Switzerland	4:06.55	Joceline Wind	3 February 2026	Ostrava	
Albania	4:06.66	Luiza Gega	17 February 2017	Istanbul	
Austria	4:06.99	Theresia Kiesl	1 February 1998	Stuttgart	
Ukraine	4:07.08; 4:06.78 X 4:06.4 h	Tetyana Samolenko; Anzhelika Shevchenko; Tetyana Pozdnyakova	8 March 1987; 14 February 2012; 5 February 1983	Indianapolis; Liévin; Moscow	
South Africa	4:07.25	Dominique Scott	10 February 2018	Boston	
Algeria	4:07.34	Nouria Mérah-Benida	6 February 2000	Chemnitz	
Moldova	4:07.4 h	Svetlana Guskova	25 February 1979	Vienna	
Lithuania	4:08.02	Laimutė Baikauskaitė	10 February 1988	Volgograd	
Japan	4:08.46	Nozomi Tanaka	4 February 2024	Boston	
Serbia	4:08.48	Amela Terzić	17 February 2019	Istanbul	
Norway	4:08.65	Ingvill Måkestad Bovim	22 February 2011	Stockholm	
Greece	4:08.73	Konstantina Efentaki	29 January 2005	Stuttgart	
Luxembourg	4:08.73	Vera Hoffmann	3 March 2023	Istanbul	
United Arab Emirates	4:08.79; 4:05.61 #	Betlhem Desalegn (Note: All results of Betlhem Desalegn between 6 March 2014 and 22 July 2015 were voided following a doping ban)	6 February 2014; 19 February 2015	Stockholm	
Mexico	4:08.96+	Lorena Rangel	15 February 2025	Boston	
Iceland	4:09.54	Aníta Hinriksdóttir	6 February 2018	Düsseldorf	
China	4:09.71	Xue Fei	13 February 2012	Nanjing	
Denmark	4:10.20	Tina Krebs Bahn	9 February 1985	East Rutherford	
Tanzania	4:12.24 +	Zakia Mrisho Mohamed	8 February 2009	Ghent	
Israel	4:12.44+	Adva Cohen	2 March 2025	Boston	
Argentina	4:12.95	Fedra Luna	28 January 2023	Sabadell	
Tunisia	4:13.83	Abir Nakhli	15 March 2003	Birmingham	
Suriname	4:14.05	Letitia Vriesde	12 February 1992	Budapest	
Cyprus	4:14.62	Natalia Evangelidou	9 April 2018	Athlone	
Latvia	4:15.10	Poļina Jeļizarova	1 March 2013	Gothenburg	
India	4:15.42	Sinimole Paulose	14 February 2008	Doha	
Vietnam	4:15.55	Thi Oanh Nguyen	11 February 2023	Nur-Sultan	
Colombia	4:15.73	Muriel Coneo Paredes	18 February 2018	Istanbul	
Kazakhstan	4:16.96	Svetlana Lukasheva	15 November 2005	Bangkok	
Rwanda	4:17.33	Claire Uwitonze	21 March 2025	Nanjing	
Croatia	4:17.55	Ljiljana Ćulibrk	20 January 2001	Budapest	
Uruguay	4:17.77	María Pía Fernández	1 March 2024	Glasgow	
Mozambique	4:17.93	Maria De Lurdes Mutola	1 February 1992	Portland	
Azerbaijan	4:18.07	Layes Abdullayeva	20 February 2010	Baku	
Cape Verde	4:18.79	Carla Mendes	29 February 2020	Pombal	
Estonia	4:19.12	Maile Magnusson	15 February 2001	Stockholm	
Slovakia	4:19.49; 4:16.2 hMx	Andrea Sollárová	1 February 1992; 8 February 1992	Vienna; Bratislava	
Madagascar	4:19.64	Eliane Saholinirina	29 May 2016	Sopot	
Bolivia	4:20.16	Niusha Mancilla	5 March 1999	Maebashi	
Angola	4:21.20	Lilian Silva	2 February 2008	Espinho	
Panama	4:21.51 +	Rolanda Bell	20 January 2017	New York City	
Bermuda	4:21.53	Ashley Couper	13 February 2004	New York City	
Bosnia and Herzegovina	4:21.72	Jasmina Fočak	16 February 1985	Genoa	
Peru	4:21.77	Anita Poma	21 March 2025	Nanjing	
Cameroon	4:21.78	Florence Djepe	1 March 2003	Clermont-Ferrand	
Kosovo	4:23.01	Gresa Bakraçi	10 February 2024	Istanbul	
Venezuela	4:24.24 y	Valentina Medina	23 February 2002	Lincoln	
San Marino	4:25.92	Elisa Vagnini	14 February 2000	Genoa	
Kuwait	4:29.62	Amal al-Roumi	11 February 2023	Nur-Sultan	
Armenia	4:35.48	Ellada Alaverdyan	12 February 2017	Istanbul	
Iraq	4:38.6 h	Maysa Matrood	12 October 2001	Rasht	
Puerto Rico	4:42.02 y	Liliani Mendez	28 February 2009	College Station	
Ghana	4:43.34 y	Martha Bissah	16 February 2019	Winston-Salem	
Pakistan	4:43.54	Sumaira Zahoor	25 September 2005	Tehran	
Gibraltar	4:48.76	Katherine Rogers	24 February 2024	Antequera	
Malta	4:49.64 (Note: not ratified by MAAA but recognised by World Athletics)	Giselle Camilleri	18 February 2012	Aubière	
Thailand	4:51.42	Woraphan Nuanlsri	19 September 2017	Ashgabat	
U.S. Virgin Islands	4:59.46 y	Ninfa Barnard	8 February 2014	Birmingham	
Singapore	5:09.76	Vanessa Lee Ying Zhuang	6 February 2026	Tianjin	
Bahamas	5:10.92 y	Jennaya Hield	14 February 2014	New York City	
Macau	5:22.84	Cheng Ka I	11 February 2007	Macau	
Turks and Caicos	5:27.45 y	Rebecca Bernadin	28 February 2021	Topeka	
Afghanistan	5:53.68	Madineh Ahmadi	15 February 2013	Tehran	
