= Claus Jørgensen (race walker) =

Danish race walker

Claus Jørgensen (born 15 March 1974 in Randers, Midtjylland) is a retired male race walker from Denmark, who was affiliated with MK Nørrevang during his career. His personal best time of 1:22:18 in the 20 kilometres road walk is the Danish record for the event.

He made his first and only Olympic appearance at the 1996 Summer Olympics, where he was 29th in the men's 20 km walk. He also represented Denmark at the World Championships in Athletics in 1997 and 1999. He is a four-time participant in the IAAF World Race Walking Cup.

== Achievements ==
Year	Competition	Venue	Position	Event	Notes
Representing Denmark
1992	World Junior Championships	Seoul, South Korea	8th	10,000m	41:57.48
1993	World Race Walking Cup	Monterrey, Mexico	83rd	20 km	1:42:43
1994	European Championships	Helsinki, Finland	16th	20 km	1:25:29
1995	World Race Walking Cup	Beijing, PR China	92nd	20 km	1:37:22
1996	Olympic Games	Atlanta, United States	29th	20 km	1:25:28
1997	World Race Walking Cup	Poděbrady, Czech Republic	116th	20 km	1:34:54
1997	World Championships	Athens, Greece	—	20 km	DNF
1998	European Championships	Budapest, Hungary	14th	20 km	1:26:28
1999	World Race Walking Cup	Mézidon-Canon, France	—	20 km	DNF
1999	World Championships	Seville, Spain	23rd	20 km	1:34:47
2000	European Race Walking Cup	Eisenhüttenstadt, Germany	45th	20 km	1:28:48
