= Tazana Kamanga-Dyrbak =

Danish sprinter (born 2002)

Tazana Mikkel Kamanga-Dyrbak OLY
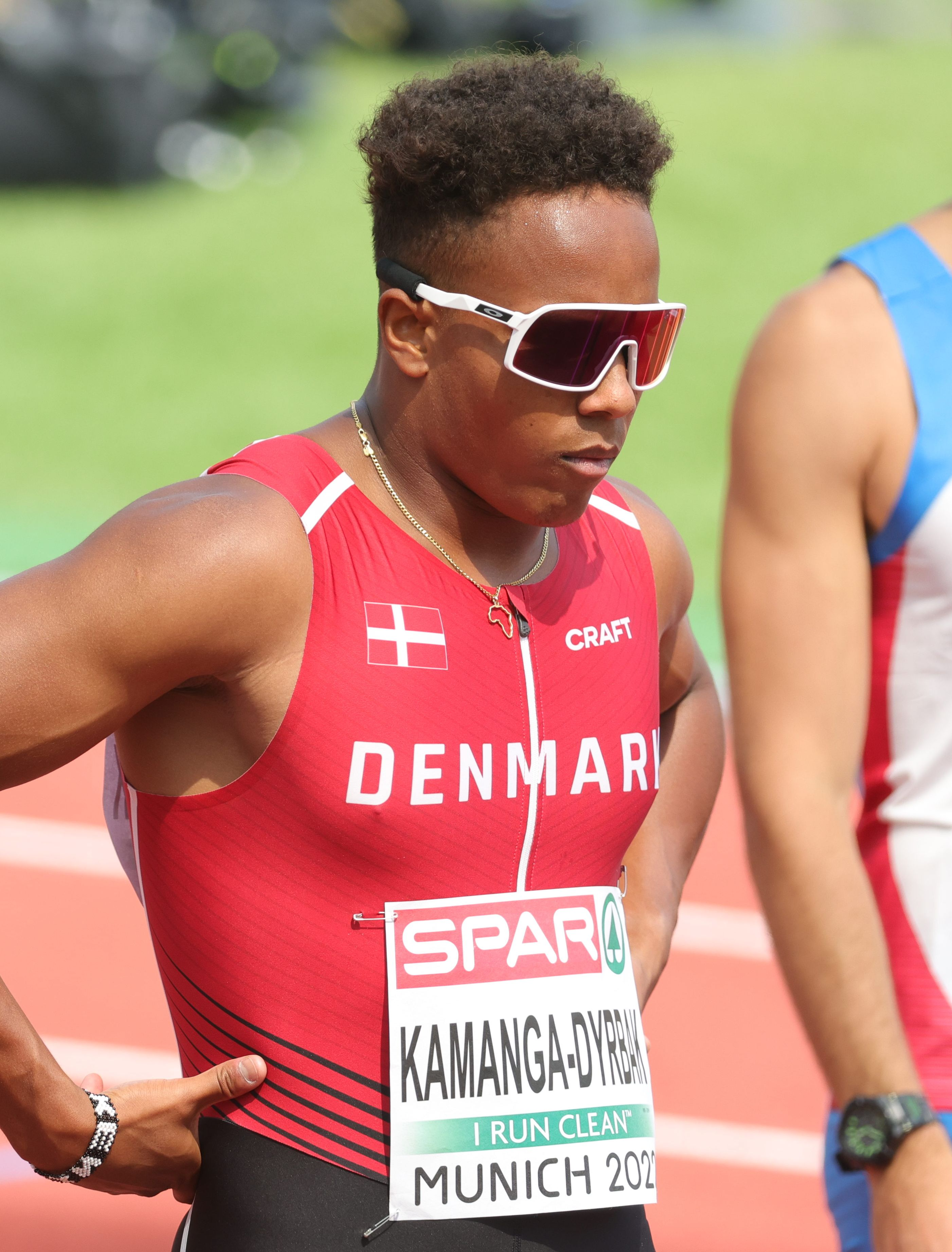
- Tazana in 2022

Personal information
- Born: 12 January 2002 (age 24)

Sport
- Sport: Athletics
- Event(s): 100 m, 200 m
- Club: Sparta AM
- Coached by: Peter Gatana (KEN)

Tazana Mikkel Kamanga-Dyrbak (born 12 January 2002) is a Danish sprinter.

A former rugby player, he has represented his country at the 2021 World Athletics Relays, establishing the national record on 4 × 100 m and qualifying Denmark for the 2020 Olympic Games in Tokyo.

Kamanga-Dyrbak attended Millfield School for a time. He has a Zambian mother, and a Danish father who grew up in Kenya, both former international swimmers. He lives and trains in Kenya where he has set up a sprint club and trains with his Kenyan coach.

== Personal bests ==
Outdoor

- 100 metres – 10.22 (+1.5 m/s, Sestriere 2022)
- 200 metres – 20.48 (+0.3 m/s, Lusaka 2021), NR
- 4 × 100 metres relay – 38.16 (Tokyo 2021) NR
