= Xie Yuchen =

Chinese discus thrower (born 1996)

Personal information
- Born: 12 May 1996 (age 30)

Sport
- Country: China
- Sport: Athletics
- Event: Discus throw

Achievements and titles
- Personal best: Discus throw: 59.76 m (2021)
Medal record
Summer World University Games
Bronze medal – third place	2021 Chengdu	Discus throw

Xie Yuchen (born 12 May 1996) is a Chinese female discus thrower, who won an individual gold medal at the Youth World Championships.
