= Kristian Uldbjerg Hansen =

Danish middle-distance runner (born 1996)

Personal information
- Born: 15 August 1996 (age 29)

Sport
- Sport: Athletics
- Event: Middle distance running

Achievements and titles
- Personal best(s): 1500m: 3:32.60 (Stockholm, 2025); Indoors; 1500m: 3:38.47 (Boston, 2025) NR

Kristian Uldbjerg Hansen (born 15 August 1996) is a Danish middle distance runner. He is the national indoor record holder over 1500 metres.

== Career ==
Born in Aalborg, and a member of Aalborg Athletics, he was raised a kilometre away from Skovdalen Atletikstadion. He won two gold medals at the Danish Athletics Championships in August 2020, winning both the 1500 meters and the 800 meters. He was selected for the 2021 European Athletics Indoor Championships in the men's 1500 metres.

He represented Denmark in the 2023 European Athletics Team Championships in Silesia. He ran at the 2023 World Athletics Championships in Budapest in the men's 1500 metres, and ran a personal best time of 3:37.27.

In February 2024, he ran 3:38.54 for the 1500 meters in Metz and broke the Danish indoor record for the distance, set by Mogens Guldberg in 1991. He competed over 1500 metres at the 2024 World Athletics Indoor Championships in Glasgow, however an injury suffered in May in Germany ruled him out for the rest of the season and meant he missed the Olympic Games.

In January 2025, he won the 1500m at the Astana Indoor Meeting, part of the 2025 World Athletics Indoor Tour, running an event record 3:39.03. In February 2025, he won the Danish Indoor Athletics Championships title over 1500 metres in Odense in a time of 3:49.40. That month, he ran 3:53.80 for a personal best in the mile run, in Boston, Massachusetts. The time cut almost six seconds from the Danish record set by Mogens Guldberg in 1988, but set a new Nordic record, which had been set by the Swede Samuel Pihlströmjust four days earlier. In May he won the 1500 metres in Nijmegen at the Next Generation Athletics. He lowered his personal best to 3:32.60 for the 1500 metres in Stockholm at the 2025 BAUHAUS-galan event in June 2025.

In September 2025, he competed at the 2025 World Championships in Tokyo, Japan, without advancing to the semi-finals.
