= Janne Nielsen =

Danish athlete (born 1993)

Personal information
- Nationality: Danish
- Born: 24 April 1993 (age 33)

Sport
- Sport: Athletics
- Event: Triple jump

Achievements and titles
- Personal bests: Triple jump: 14.13 (Tenerife, 2025) NR

Janne Nielsen (born 24 April 1993) is a Danish triple jumper. She is a multiple-time national champion and the Danish national record holder in the event.

== Early life ==
She is from Kolding, but moved to Aarhus at the age of 18 years-old. She studied Educational Science at Aarhus University.

== Career ==
Nielsen is a member of Aarhus 1900 Athletics and Running club in Aarhus, and worked closely with athletics trainer Lars Nielsen for many years, although she has also spent time training in France with Teddy Tamgho and represented the French club Bordeaux Athlé. She set a new personal best of 13.82 metres to win the Danish Championships in 2020, her eighth national title between indoors and outdoors competition, and extended her own national record in September of that year to 13.99 metres.

However, she had a few years where she was severely impacted by injuries and considered her future in the sport. She returned to Denmark to train under Lars Nielsen again in Aarhus. In May 2025, she set a new Danish national record for the triple jump breaking her own record with a jump of 14.13m at the Canarias Athletics Invitational in Tenerife. The following month, she competed for Denmark at the 2025 European Athletics Team Championships Second Division event in Maribor, Slovenia.

In September 2025, she competed at the 2025 World Championships in Tokyo, Japan, without advancing to the final. In August 2026, she competed at the 2026 European Athletics Championships in Birmingham, England.
