= List of Danish records in athletics =

The following are the national records in athletics in Denmark maintained by Denmark's national athletics federation: Dansk Atletik Forbund (DAF).

== Outdoor ==
Key to tables: Awaiting ratification Record not kept by DAF Not ratified or later rescinded by DAF

=== Men ===
Event	Record	Athlete	Date	Meet	Place	Ref.
100 m	10.11 (−0.1 m/s)	Simon Hansen	29 June 2024	Danish Championships	Hvidovre, Denmark	
200 m	20.49 (−0.2 m/s)	Simon Hansen	5 September 2021		Aarhus, Denmark	
200 m	20.48 A (+0.3 m/s)	Tazana Kamanga-Dyrbak	11 April 2021	All Comers Meet	Lusaka, Zambia	
300 m	32.32	Benjamin Lobo Vedel	30 January 2024	ACNW Track & Field League 1	Potchefstroom, South Africa	
400 m	45.41	Gustav Lundholm Nielsen	14 July 2024	Resisprint International	La Chaux-de-Fonds, Switzerland	
600 m	1:18.14	Andreas Bube	19 August 2020	Gyulai István Memorial	Székesfehérvár, Hungary	
800 m	1:41.11	Wilson Kipketer	24 August 1997		Cologne, Germany	
1000 m	2:16.29	Wilson Kipketer	23 August 1995			
1500 m	3:31.17	Robert Kiplagat Andersen	13 August 1997	Weltklasse Zürich	Zürich, Switzerland	
Mile	3:50.79	Robert Kiplagat Andersen	26 August 1997	ISTAF	Berlin, Germany	
Mile (road)	3:57.3 h	Tom Birger Hansen	4 July 1975		London, United Kingdom	
2000 m	4:59.56	Mogens Guldberg	15 September 1987			
3000 m	7:43.78	Mogens Guldberg	13 September 1989		Jerez, Spain	
5000 m	13:14.98	Joel Ibler Lillesø	9 August 2025	IFAM Oordegem	Oordegem, Belgium	
5 km (road)	13:38	Joel Ibler Lillesø	31 December 2025	B100 Cursa dels Nassos	Barcelona, Spain	
10,000 m	27:54.76	Carsten Jørgensen	4 April 1998		Lisbon, Portugal	
10 km (road)	28:16	Jacob Sommer Simonsen	12 January 2025	10K Valencia Ibercaja	Valencia, Spain	
10 km (road)	27:55	Joel Ibler Lillesø	4 April 2026	Urban Trail de Lille	Lille, France	
15 km (road)	43:11 +	Jacob Sommer Simonsen	20 September 2026	World Road Running Championships	Copenhagen, Denmark	
10 miles (road)	46:13	Carsten Jørgensen	20 September 1998	Glen Dimplex Cross Border Challenge	Newry, United Kingdom	
20,000 m (track)	1:00:03.83+	Abdi Hakin Ulad	4 September 2020	Memorial Van Damme	Brussels, Belgium	
20 km (road)	57:34+	Jacob Sommer Simonsen	25 October 2026	Valencia Half Marathon	Valencia, Spain	
One hour	19985 m	Abdi Hakin Ulad	4 September 2020	Memorial Van Damme	Brussels, Belgium	
Half marathon	1:01:11	Jacob Sommer Simonsen	16 February 2025	Barcelona Half Marathon	Barcelona, Spain	
Half marathon	1:00:46	Jacob Sommer Simonsen	20 September 2026	World Road Running Championships	Copenhagen, Denmark	
Half marathon	1:00:42	Jacob Sommer Simonsen	25 October 2026	Valencia Half Marathon	Valencia, Spain	
25 km (road)	1:15:38+	Jacob Sommer Simonsen	29 September 2024	Berlin Marathon	Berlin, Germany	
Marathon	2:07:51	Jacob Sommer Simonsen	29 September 2024	Berlin Marathon	Berlin, Germany	
100 km (road)	6:52:19	Mads Lund Skaaning	26 April 2025		Viborg, Denmark	
24 hours	266.940 km	Emil Krog Ingerslev	1–2 June 2024		Sæby, Denmark	
24 hours	278.132 km	Emil Krog Ingerslev	18–19 October 2025	IAU 24 Hour World Championship	Albi, France	
110 m hurdles	13.50 (+1.0 m/s)	Andreas Martinsen	20 June 2017	Copenhagen Athletics Games	Copenhagen, Denmark	
200 m hurdles	23.1 h	Claus Hirsbro	20 May 1992			
400 m hurdles	50.01	Nicolai Hartling	10 August 2019	European Team Championships	Varaždin, Croatia	
400 m hurdles	49.81	Sebastian Monneret	24 May 2026	IFAM Outdoor	Brussels, Belgium	
400 m hurdles	49.40	Sebastian Monneret	20 June 2026	Motonet GP Kuortane	Kuortane, Finland	
2000 m steeplechase	5:34.02	Ole Hesselbjerg	3 September 2024	Copenhagen Athletics Games	Copenhagen, Denmark	
3000 m steeplechase	8:20.42	Ole Hesselbjerg	8 June 2021	Paavo Nurmi Games	Turku, Finland	
High jump	2.28 m	Janick Klausen	20 June 2019		Essen, Germany	
Pole vault	5.75 m	Piotr Buciarski	27 April 2002		Fort-de-France, France	
Long jump	8.25 m (+0.5 m/s)	Morten Jensen	3 July 2005		Gothenburg, Sweden	
Triple jump	16.88 m (+0.6 m/s)	Anders Møller	7 August 2011	Danish Championships	Copenhagen, Denmark	
Shot put	21.61 m	Joachim Olsen	13 June 2007		Copenhagen, Denmark	
Discus throw	61.30 m	Steen Hedegård	30 August 1977		Copenhagen, Denmark	
Hammer throw	77.02 m	Jan Bielecki	8 September 2002		Bad Köstritz, Germany	
Javelin throw	81.22 m	Kenneth Pedersen	5 August 1989		Copenhagen, Denmark	
Decathlon	7994 pts	Lars Warming	18–19 June 1988	Hypo-Meeting	Götzis, Austria	
Decathlon	100m (wind) / Long jump (wind) / Shot put / High jump / 400m / 110m H (wind) / Discus / Pole vault / Javelin / 1500m; 11.08 / 7.31 m / 13.54 m / 1.93 m / 48.03 / 14.34 / 42.60 m / 4.70 m / 51.94 m / 4:17.35					
20 km walk (road)	1:22:18	Claus Jørgensen	11 May 1996		Eisenhüttenstadt, Germany	
50 km walk (road)	3:51:46	Jacob Sørensen	15 June 2002		Dublin, Ireland	
4 × 100 m relay	38.16	Denmark; Simon Hansen; Tazana Kamanga-Dyrbak; Kojo Musah; Frederik Schou-Nielsen	5 August 2021	Olympic Games	Tokyo, Japan	
4 × 200 m relay	1:25.53	IF Sparta; Christian Trajkovski; Bernie Bengtsson; Henrik Paulsen; Lars Pedersen	3 June 1989		Østerbro, Denmark	
4 × 200 m relay	1:25.53	IF Sparta; Christian Trajkovski; Henrik Paulsen; Karsten Krygermeier; Lars Pedersen	19 May 1990		Østerbro, Denmark	
4 × 400 m relay	3:03.95	Denmark; Gustav Lundholm Nielsen; Joel Frederik von d'Ahe; Sebastian Højriis Monneret; Benjamin Vedel	15 June 2025	Sparkassen Gala	Regensburg, Germany	
4 × 400 m relay	3:02.19	Denmark; Gustav Lundholm Nielsen; Neloo Falck; Jacob Hvorup; Sebastian Monneret	14 August 2026	European Championships	Birmingham, United Kingdom	
4 × 800 m relay	7:27.3 h	Århus 1900 ? ? ? ?	21 August 1987			
4 × 1500 m relay	15:18.5 h	IF Sparta ? ? ? ?	2 August 1986			

=== Women ===
Event	Record	Athlete	Date	Meet	Place	Ref.
100 m	11.32 (+0.2 m/s)	Ida Karstoft	11 June 2022	Copenhagen Open	Hvidovre, Sweden	
200 m	22.60 (+1.4 m/s)	Ida Karstoft	12 April 2024	Tom Jones Memorial	Gainesville, United States	
300 m	38.74	Sofie Abildtrup	27 August 2002			
400 m	52.84	Rikke Rønholt	6 July 2006		Århus, Denmark	
800 m	2:00.97	Karen Gydesen	29 June 1994		Helsinki, Finland	
1000 m	2:43.7 h	Gitte Karlshøj	27 September 1990			
1500 m	4:05.34	Sofia Thøgersen	19 August 2023	World Championships	Budapest, Hungary	
Mile	4:30.2	Loa Olafsson	25 May 1978			
Mile (road)	4:26.78 Wo	Annemarie Nissen	19 September 2026	World Road Running Championships	Copenhagen, Denmark	
2000 m	5:43.7 h	Gitte Karlshøj	18 September 1991			
3000 m	8:42.3 h	Loa Olafsson	27 June 1978	Bislett Games	Oslo, Norway	
5000 m	15:07.70	Anna Emilie Møller	14 July 2019	European U23 Championships	Gävle, Sweden	
5 km (road)	15:21	Sofia Thøgersen	16 March 2025		Lille, France	
5 km (road)	15:13 (Note: by World Athletics source; 15:12 by DAF source)	Juliane Hvid	21 May 2026	Ditur Gadeløb	Aarhus, Denmark	
10,000 m	31:45.4 Mx	Loa Olafsson	6 April 1978		Copenhagen, Denmark	
10,000 m	32:02.89	Dorthe S. Rasmussen	4 September 1983		Knarvik, Norway	
10 km (road)	32:06	Dorthe S. Rasmussen	15 January 1983		Miami, United States	
15 km (road)	49:08	Dorthe S. Rasmussen	23 June 1991		Portland, United States	
20 km (road)	1:07:06	Dorthe S. Rasmussen	28 November 1982			
Half marathon	1:09:48	Dorthe S. Rasmussen	24 March 1991			
25 km (road)	1:28:32	Annemette Jensen	21 April 1984		Paderborn, Germany	
Marathon	2:29:34	Dorthe S. Rasmussen	23 April 1989	London Marathon	London, United Kingdom	
100 km (road)	7:53.15	Anni Lønstad	16 April 1994		Hanau, Germany	
12-hour run	135.050 km	Bouchra Lundgren Eriksen	2 June 2024	I Feel Slovenia12Run	Kranj, Slovenia	
24 hours	231.339 km	Anne Marie Geisler Andersen	2 July 2017	IAU 24 Hour World Championship	Belfast, United Kingdom	
100 m hurdles	12.83 (+2.0 m/s)	Mette Graversgaard	24 May 2023		Savona, Italy	
200 m hurdles	27.3 h	Dorte Wolfsberg	7 July 1981		?	
300 m hurdles	39.42	Sara Petersen	11 June 2020	Impossible Games	Oslo, Norway	
400 m hurdles	53.55	Sara Petersen	18 August 2016	Olympic Games	Rio de Janeiro, Brazil	
2000 m steeplechase	6:24.51	Sofia Thøgersen	11 September 2021		Hvidovre, Denmark	
3000 m steeplechase	9:13.46	Anna Emilie Møller	30 September 2019	World Championships	Doha, Qatar	
High jump	1.94 m	Pia Zinck	8 August 1997	World Championships	Athens, Greece	
Pole vault	4.55 m	Caroline Bonde Holm	17 August 2022	European Championships	Munich, Germany	
Long jump	6.96 m (+2.0 m/s)	Renata Nielsen	5 June 1994		Seville, Spain	
Triple jump	13.99 m (+0.8 m/s)	Janne Nielsen	13 September 2020	French Championships	Albi, France	
Shot put	16.97 m	Thea Jensen	26 May 2022		Bloomington, United States	
Discus throw	62.22 m	Lisa Brix Pedersen	24 June 2023		Aalborg, Denmark	
Hammer throw	74.22 m	Katrine Koch Jacobsen	8 June 2022		Trnava, Slovakia	
Hammer throw	75.52 m	Katrine Koch Jacobsen	14 March 2026	European Throwing Cup	Nikosia, Cyprus	
Javelin throw	64.83 m	Christina Scherwin	9 September 2006	World Athletics Final	Stuttgart, Germany	
Heptathlon	5722 pts h	Dorte Klein	27–28 August 1983		Århus, Denmark	
Heptathlon	100m H (wind) / High jump / Shot put / 200m (wind) / Long jump (wind) / Javelin / 800m; 14.5w / 1.77 m / 11.07 m / 25.5w / 5.89 m / 48.38 m / 2:18.8					
5000 m walk (track)	23:25.4	Gunhild Kristiansen	21 September 1985			
10 km walk (road)	48:31	Karin Jensen	19 September 1991			
20 km walk (road)	1:45:28	Gunhild Kristiansen	9 May 1986		Värnamo, Sweden	
50 km walk (road)						
4 × 100 m relay	43.46	Denmark; Mette Graversgaard; Mathilde Kramer; Astrid Glenner-Frandsen; Ida Karstoft	22 July 2022	World Championships	Eugene, United States	
4 × 200 m relay	1:37.80	Denmark; Louise Østergaard; Emma Beiter Bomme; Mathilde Kramer; Mette Graversgaard	2 May 2021	World Relays	Chorzów, Poland	
4 × 400 m relay	3:36.2 h	Denmark; Birgitte Jennes; Kirsten Høiler; Pia Lund Hansen; Annelise Damm-Olesen	19 September 1969	European Championships	Athens, Greece	

=== Mixed ===
Event	Record	Athlete	Date	Meet	Place	Ref.
4 × 400 m relay	3:24.72	Denmark	25 June 2019		Minsk, Belarus	
4 × 400 m relay	3:23.15	Denmark; Gustav Lindholm Nielsen; Anna Krab Scheibelein; Nick Rostgaard Jensen; Anne Sofie Kirkegaard	29 June 2025	European Team Championships	Maribor, Slovenia	

== Indoor ==
=== Men ===
Event	Record	Athlete	Date	Meet	Place	Ref.
50 m	5.75	Martin Krabbe	18 February 2010		Århus, Denmark	
50 m	5.5 h	Claus Hirsbro	15 January 1994			
60 m	6.56	Kojo Musah	30 January 2022		Randers, Norway	
200 m	20.97	Benjamin Lobo Vedel	22 February 2019	SEC Championships	Fayetteville, United States	
300 m	32.51	Benjamin Lobo Vedel	6 January 2018	Orange & Purple Invitational	Clemson, United States	
400 m	45.67	Benjamin Lobo Vedel	19 March 2022	World Championships	Belgrade, Serbia	
800 m	1:42.67	Wilson Kipketer	9 March 1997	World Championships	Paris, France	
1000 m	2:14.96	Wilson Kipketer	20 February 2000	Aviva Indoor Grand Prix	Birmingham, United Kingdom	
1500 m	3:38.47+	Kristian Uldbjerg Hansen	8 February 2025	Bruce Lehane Scarlet and White Invitational	Boston, United States	
Mile	3:53.80	Kristian Uldbjerg Hansen	8 February 2025	Bruce Lehane Scarlet and White Invitational	Boston, United States	
3000 m	7:44.76	Mogens Guldberg	9 March 1991	World Championships	Seville, Spain	
5000 m	14:22.54	Lars Juhl	11 March 2000			
50 m hurdles	6.77	Andreas Martinsen	12 February 2015		Århus, Denmark	
60 m hurdles	7.68 (heat)	Andreas Martinsen	3 March 2017	European Championships	Belgrade, Serbia	
60 m hurdles	7.68 (final)	Andreas Martinsen	3 March 2017	European Championships	Belgrade, Serbia	
High jump	2.27 m	Michael Mikkelsen	4 March 1990	European Championships	Glasgow, United Kingdom	
High jump	2.27 m	Janick Klausen	4 March 2011	European Championships	Paris, France	
Pole vault	5.72 m	Martin Voss	25 February 1995		Malmö, Sweden	
Long jump	8.18 m	Morten Jensen	8 February 2006		Gothenburg, Sweden	
Triple jump	17.01 m	Anders Møller	25 February 2006		Malmö, Sweden	
Shot put	21.63 m	Joachim Olsen	25 February 2004		Tallinn, Estonia	
Discus throw	53.43 m	Andreas Ellegaard	1 March 2015	World Indoor Throwing	Växjö, Sweden	
Javelin throw	55.82 m	David Korczynski	10 March 2012	World Indoor Throwing	Växjö, Sweden	
Weight throw (35 lb)	21.55 m	Jan Bielecki	14 February 1997		Baton Rouge, United States	
Heptathlon	5613 pts h	Christian Gundersen	3–4 February 2024	Danish Combined Championships	Randers, Denmark	
Heptathlon	60m / Long jump / Shot put / High jump / 60m H / Pole vault / 1000m; 7.12 / 6.86 m / 13.38 m / 1.83 m / 8.25 / 4.80 m / 2:39.40					
3000 m walk	11:53.9+	Claus Jørgensen	19 February 1994		Århus, Denmark	
5000 m walk	20:14.9	Claus Jørgensen	19 February 1994		Århus, Denmark	
10,000 m walk	42:33.4	Claus Jørgensen	20 March 1994		Århus, Denmark	
4 × 200 m relay	1:26.50	Denmark; Claus Hirsbro; Lars Pedersen; Peter Voigt; Kenneth Jensen	25 February 1996			
4 × 400 m relay						

=== Women ===
Event	Record	Athlete	Date	Meet	Place	Ref.
50 m	6.33	Dorthe A. Rasmussen	22 February 1981	European Championships	Grenoble, France	
60 m	7.24	Ida Karstoft	2 March 2022		Aarhus, Denmark	
200 m	23.22	Ida Karstoft	13 February 2022	Nordic Indoor Match	Uppsala, Sweden	
400 m	52.59 (Note: outdoor mark ratified as absolute record)	Sara Petersen	13 February 2016	Nordenkampen	Växjö, Sweden	
800 m	2:02.33	Heidi Jensen	17 February 2000	GE Galan	Stockholm, Sweden	
1000 m	2:44.90	Tina Krebs	1 March 1986		Clemson, United States	
1500 m	4:10.20	Tina Krebs	9 February 1985		East Rutherford, United States	
Mile	4:29.31	Sofia Thøgersen	30 January 2024	Czech Indoor Gala	Ostrava, Czech Republic	
3000 m	9:00.80	Alberte Kjær Pedersen	4 March 2021	European Championships	Toruń, Poland	
50 m hurdles	7.28	Mette Graversgaard	28 December 2019		Aarhus, Denmark	
60 m hurdles	7.92	Mette Graversgaard	5 March 2023	European Championships	Istanbul, Turkey	
60 m hurdles	7.89	Ida Beiter Bomme	22 March 2026	World Championships	Toruń, Poland	
400 m hurdles	56.66	Sara Petersen	18 February 2012	Meeting National	Val-de-Reuil, France	
High jump	1.90 m	Pia Zinck	7 March 1997	World Championships	Paris, France	
High jump	1.90 m	Pia Zinck	30 January 1998		Arnstadt, Germany	
Pole vault	4.50 m	Caroline Bonde Holm	19 February 2022	stav- och längdhoppsgala	Kalmar, Sweden	
Long jump	6.77 m	Renata Nielsen	12 March 1995	World Championships	Barcelona, Spain	
Triple jump	13.72 m	Janne Nielsen	29 February 2020	French Championships	Liévin, France	
Shot put	16.76 m	Trine Mulbjerg	28 February 2015	World Indoor Throwing	Växjö, Sweden	
Discus throw	59.57 m	Lisa Brix Pedersen	25 February 2022	Swedish Championships	Växjö, Sweden	
Javelin throw	47.92 m	Nina Otto	10 March 2012	World Indoor Throwing	Växjö, Sweden	
Pentathlon	4072 pts	Tine Bach Ejlersen	3 February 2013	Danish Championships	Århus, Denmark	
Pentathlon	60m H / High jump / Shot put / Long jump / 800m; 8.67 / 1.76 m / 10.92 m / 5.90 m / 2:25.28					
3000 m walk	14:11.0	Gunhild Klarksen	24 February 1991		Århus, Denmark	
5000 m walk	24:55.0	Karin Jensen	10 February 1990		Herning, Denmark	
10,000 m walk	51:47.0	Gunhild Kristiansen	17 March 1984		Odense, Denmark	
4 × 200 m relay	1:38.55	Århus 1900; Sara Petersen; Martha Danneskjold Rasmussen; Thea Lyng Møller Jensen; Mette Graversgaard	17 February 2019	Danish Championships	Skive, Denmark	
4 × 400 m relay						
