= Jesper Faurschou =

Danish athlete (born 1983)

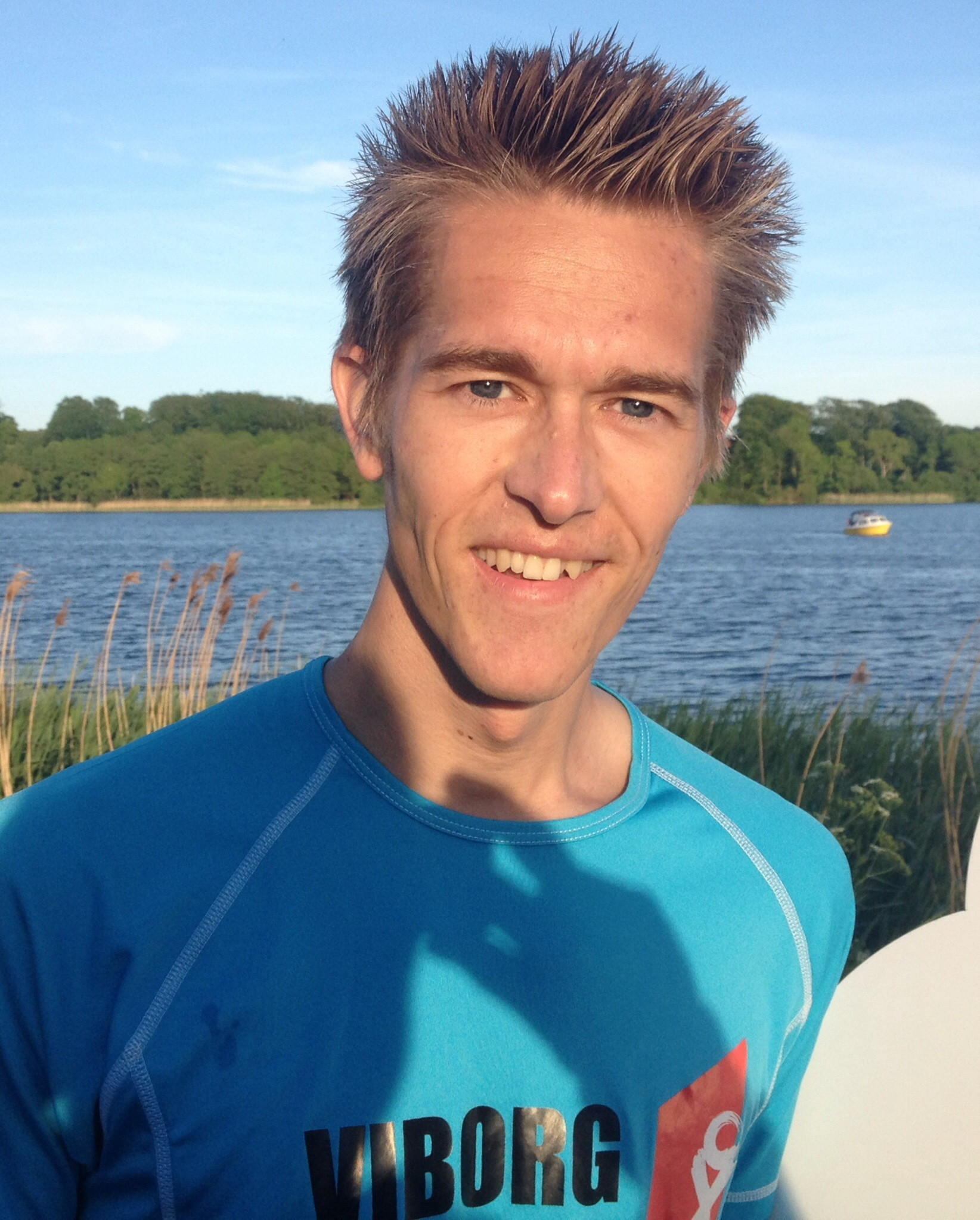
- Jesper Faurschou in 2014

Personal information
- Born: 1 July 1983 (age 42)
- Height: 1.83 m (6 ft 0 in)
- Weight: 63 kg (139 lb)

Sport
- Country: Denmark
- Sport: Athletics
- Event(s): 10,000 metres, Marathon
Medal record
Men's athletics
Danish Championships
| Gold medal – first place | 2006 | 10,000 metres |
| Gold medal – first place | 2007 | Half marathon |
| Gold medal – first place | 2007 | 5000 metres |
| Gold medal – first place | 2007 | 10,000 metres |
| Gold medal – first place | 2008 | Half marathon |
| Gold medal – first place | 2008 | 10,000 metres |
| Silver medal – second place | Middelfart 2014 | Half marathon |
| Silver medal – second place | 2014 | 10,000 metres |

Jesper Lind Faurschou (born 1 July 1983) is a Danish athlete. He is a part of Herning Running Club, Herning Løbeklub, located in Herning. However, he is currently living in Århus.

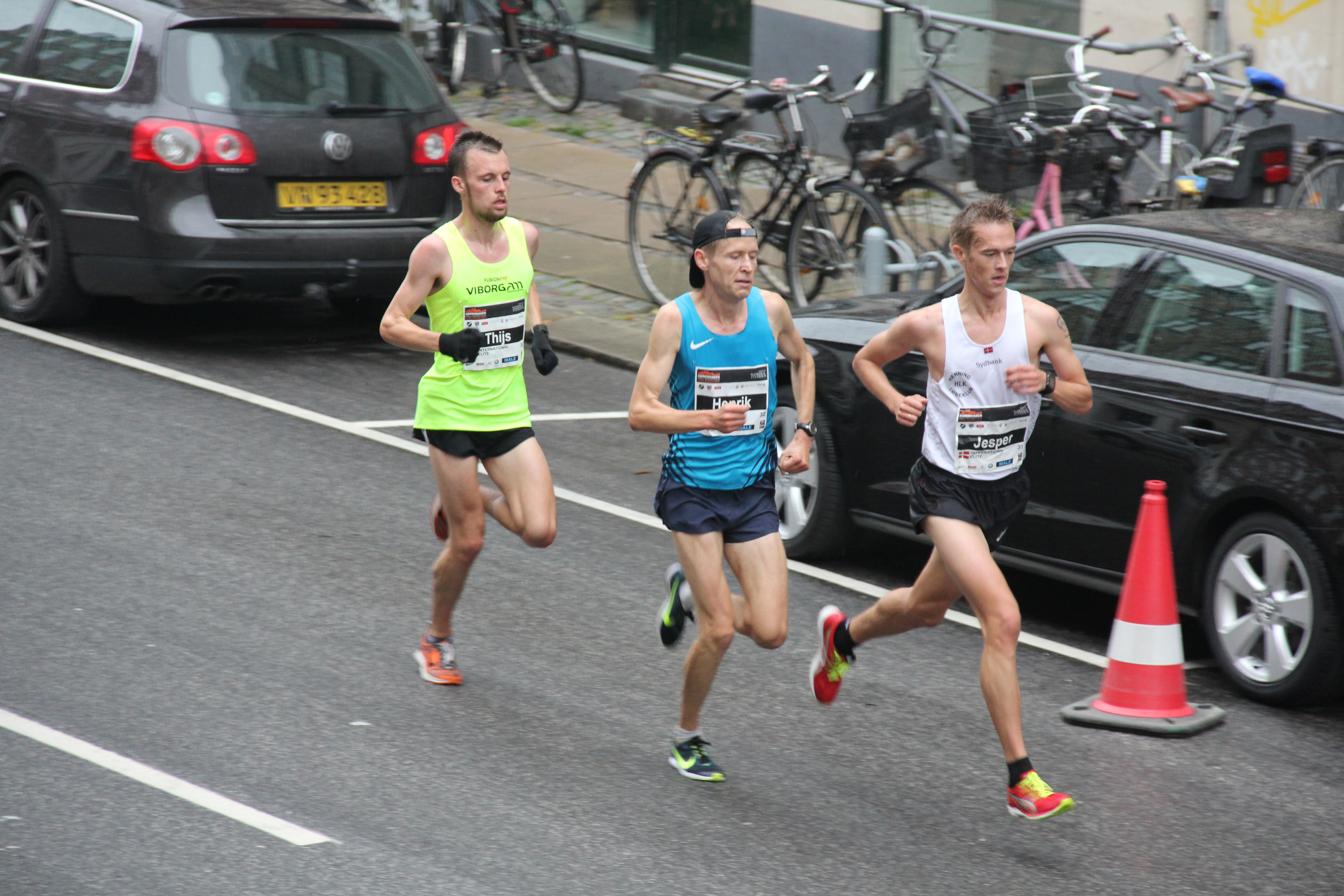
Copenhagen Half marathon Sep 13 2015 at 19.5 km with Thijs Nijhuis and Henrik Them Andersen

In 2007 he set a Danish record. He was the first ever to win 5 individual championships in one year – 10 km road, 4 km cross country, half marathon, 5000 metres and 10000 metres.

In 2008 he participated in the IAAF World Half Marathon Championships, the IAAF World Cross Country Championships (finishing in 127th), and the European Cross Country Championships.

In 2009 he set yet another Danish record, being the first male to win the Winter Tournament three times in a row. The Winter Tournament is a series of 7 runs - either cross country running or road racing.

In 2010, he finished in 29th at the European Championships.

At the 2011 World Championships, he finished in 33rd in the marathon.

He participated in the 2012 Summer Olympics in the marathon finishing 41st.

He competed in the world half marathon championships in 2014, held in Copenhagen, finishing in 62nd. At the 2014 European Championships, he finished in 22nd.

At the end of the year 2020 he set a Danish record at 50 km.

== Records ==
- 1500 metres: 3.51,39 min
- 3000 metres: 8.11,98 min
- 5000 metres: 14.15,56 min
- 10000 metres: 29.42,56 min
- 10K: 29.40 min
- Half marathon: 1.04.01 hours
- Marathon: 2.16.15 hours
- 50K 2.58.31 hours
