= Lisa Brix Pedersen =

Danish discus thrower (born 1996)

Personal information
- Nationality: Denmark
- Born: Lisa Brix; 16 August 1996 (age 30)
- Height: 179 cm (5 ft 10 in)
- Weight: 77 kg (170 lb)

Sport
- Sport: Athletics
- Events: Discus throw Shot put
- Club: Sparta; Løb
- Coached by: Carsten Bomme

Achievements and titles
- National finals: 2012 Danish Champs; • Discus throw, 36.90; 2013 Danish Champs; • Discus throw, 3rd (bronze); 2015 Danish Champs; • Discus throw, 2nd (silver); 2015 Danish U20s; • Discus throw, 1st (gold); 2016 Danish Champs; • Discus throw, 2nd (silver); 2017 Danish U23s; • Discus throw, 1st (gold); 2017 Danish Champs; • Discus throw, 1st (gold); 2018 Belarusian Champs; • Discus throw, 4th; 2018 Danish Champs; • Discus throw, 1st (gold); 2019 Danish Champs; • Discus throw, 2nd (silver); 2020 Danish Champs; • Discus throw, 2nd (silver); 2021 Danish Champs; • Discus throw, 1st (gold); 2022 Danish Champs; • Discus throw, 1st (gold); 2023 Danish Champs; • Discus throw, 1st (gold)
- Personal bests
Medal record
Women's athletics
Representing Denmark
European Throwing Cup
Silver medal – second place	2022 Leiria	Discus throw
- Updated on 1 January 2024

Lisa Brix Pedersen (born 16 August 1996) is a Danish discus thrower. She is a five-time Danish Athletics Championships winner and the championship record-holder in the discus.

== Biography ==
Pedersen's first global championship was at the 2013 World U18 Championships in the discus, where she finished 16th in qualification.

Pedersen broke the Danish record in the discus for the first time in 2022, at the National Long Throw Championships in Vagos, Portugal. She threw 61.29 m on her first attempt, good for second place and automatically qualifying her for both the European and World Championships. At the 2022 European Throwing Cup in Leiria, Pedersen won her first continental medal with a 2nd-place showing in the discus, throwing 61.23 m behind Daisy Osakue's 61.56 m.

At the 2022 World Athletics Championships, Pedersen was diagnosed with COVID-19 shortly after arrival in Eugene. After being confined to a room with limited opportunities to train for several days, she was finally cleared to compete on 18 July, the same day that discus qualification started. She threw 56.54 metres to place 29th out of 30 competitors, not making the finals. Pedersen had an opportunity to redeem herself at the 2022 European Championships discus throw, where she qualified for the finals and placed 10th.

In her first appearance at the Team Championships, Pedersen won the 2023 European Athletics Team Championships Second Division discus throw, scoring 16 points with a 59.20 m throw. She had already secured a winning throw by the end of the fifth round, but on her sixth and final throw she improved even further. The effort helped Denmark total 312 points for 6th place, enough to maintain their position but not enough to be promoted to First Division. At the 2023 World Championships, Pedersen finished 24th out of 37 in qualification with a 57.96 m best throw.

Pedersen is coached by a team managed by Mikkel Larsen, and she is a member of the Sparta and Løb clubs.

== Statistics ==
=== Personal bests ===
Event	Mark	Place	Competition	Venue	Date	Ref
Discus throw	62.22 m NR	1st place, gold medalist(s)	Danish Athletics Championships	Aalborg, Denmark	24 June 2023	
Shot put	11.55 m	6th	Danish U23 Championships	Copenhagen, Denmark	18 June 2016	
