= Danish Athletics Federation =

Sports governing body in Denmark

- Sport: Athletics
- Abbreviation: DAF
- Founded: 1907
- Affiliation: World Athletics
- Regional affiliation: EAA
- Headquarters: Brøndby
- President: Karsten Munkvad
- Secretary: Jakob Larsen

Official website
- dansk-atletik.dk
- (Denmark)

The Danish Athletics Federation (Danish: Dansk Atletik Forbund) is the governing body for the sport of athletics in Denmark. It is responsible for maintaining the Danish records in athletics.

The federation was founded in 1907 and as of 2023 represents 250 athletics associations with a combined total of 32,000 members.

== History ==
The Danish Athletics Federation was founded on 28 July 1907, it replaced the previous athletics federation, which was founded on 23 November 1900.

=== List of presidents ===
Name	Year
Lars Werge	2024
Thomas Vang Christensen	2024
Simone Frandsen	2022
Christina Schnohr	2022
Bent Jensen	2021
Karsten Munkvad	2012
Lars Vermund	2010
Søren B. Henriksen	2006
Martin Roald-Arbøl	2004
Thomas Thomsen	1996
Troels Peter Troelsen	1992
Niels Christian Nygaard	1986
Mogens Finn Jensen (now Jung)	1980
Kristian Lyhne Pedersen	1970
Eigil Kristen Winther Kragh	1965
Johannes Emanuel Rose	1958
Knud Madsen Thomsen	1955
Thor Dahl-Jensen	1948
Axel Harald Pedersen	1944
Peter Immanuel Madsen	1943
Svend Ewald Jensen	1940
Sofus Johannes Larsen	1929
Oluf Mikael Kristian Madsen	1927
Andreas Harsfelt	1924
Georg Louis Hintz	1921
Arne Halfdan Sigurd Højme	1910
Jens Peter Karl Valdemar	1909
Peter Nicholaj Holst	1900,1907
Holger Louis Nielsen	1906
Oluf Benjamin Müller	1905
Johan Ludwig Nathansen	1904

== Board of directors ==
Name	Role
Lars Werge	Chairman
Jon Andersen	Vice-President
Mette Thorup Sørensen	Accounting expert
Jesper Faurschou	Board member
Søren Rasmussen	Board member
Knud Høyer	Board member
Annette Juma Nielsen	Board member
Thomas Meloni Rønn	Board member
Bo Lindholm	Board member

== Committees ==
=== Technical Committee ===
This committee was responsible for rules, conduct of competitions and the upkeep of facilities. The chairman of this committee is [Martin Roald-Arbøl], the members are Kirsten Bergmann, Inge-Marie Schöler, Peer Jensen, and Ole Mark Helwigh.

=== Masters Committee ===
This committee was responsible for implementing the vision of the entire organization for athletes in Danish sports. The chairman of this committee is [Knud Høyer], the members are Thomas Andersen, Inge Faldager, and- Knud Erik Pedersen.

=== Legal Committee ===
The legal committee, formerly the legislative committee, makes sure regulations are logical, that they are met and also revises them to get rid of vagueness. The chairman of this committee is [Bent Bagge], the members are Erik Thestrup, Niels-Chr- Bendixen, and Steen E. Jensen.

=== Committees of Order ===
The committees of order, formerly the appeal committees, The chairman of this committee is [Niels Kahlke], the members are Mikkel Kleis and Simone Frandsen, while the alternates are Ole Middelhea and Thomas Christensen.

=== Disciplinary Committees ===
These committees take action when rules are broken, but they are not functioning at the annual meeting 2024.

== Annual Meetings ==
The Danish Athletics Federation has held annual meetings for every year from 2015 to 2024. Two extraordinary meetings have also been held, in 2024 and 2022.

== Affiliations ==
- World Athletics
- European Athletic Association (EAA)
- National Olympic Committee and Sports Confederation of Denmark

== See also ==
- Denmark
- Sport
