= Denmark at the 2010 European Athletics Championships =

Sporting event delegation

Denmark was represented by 15 athletes (9 men and 3 women) at the 2010 European Athletics Championships held in Barcelona, Spain, from 27 July to 1 August 2010.

== Participants ==
| Event | Men | Women |
|---|---|---|
| 100 m | Jesper Simonsen | |
| 400 m | Nicklas Hyde | |
| 800 m | Andreas Bube | |
| 1500 m | Morten Munkholm | |
| 400 hurdles | | Sara Slott Petersen |
| Marathon | Jesper Faurschou | |
| High Jump | Janick Klausen | |
| Pole Vault | Rasmus W. Jørgensen | Caroline Bonde Holm |
| Long Jump | Morten Jensen | |
| Shot Put | Kim Juhl Christensen | |
| 4 x 400 m relay | Andreas Bube; Daniel B. Christense; Jacob Riis; Nicklas Hyde; Rasmus Olsen | |

== Results ==
| 2010 Barcelona | Gold | Silver | Bronze | Total |
| Denmark (DEN) | 0 | 0 | 0 | 0 |
