= Denmark at the 2012 European Athletics Championships =

Denmark competed at the 2012 European Athletics Championships held in Helsinki, Finland, between 27 June to 1 July 2012.

== Medals ==
Medal	Name	Event	Date
Silver	Andreas Bube	Men's 800 metres	29 June

== Results ==
=== Men ===
Track events

Event	Athletes	Heats		Semifinal		Final	
Event	Athletes	Result	Rank	Result	Rank	Result	Rank
400 m	Nick Ekelund-Arenander	46.78	20 Q	46.57	14	did not advance	
800 m	Andreas Bube	1:46.51	2 Q	1:48.48	14 Q	1:48.69	2nd place, silver medalist(s)
1500 m	Andreas Bueno	3:42.81	9	—N/a		did not advance	

Field events

Event	Athletes	Qualification		Final	
Event	Athletes	Result	Rank	Result	Rank
Long jump	Morten Jensen	8.06	4 Q	7.56	11
Triple jump	Anders Møller	15.98	21	did not advance	
Pole vault	Rasmus Jørgensen	5.50	8 q	5.50	7
Shot put	Kim Christensen	19.69	6 q	19.00	12

=== Women ===
Track events

Event	Athletes	Heats		Semifinal		Final	
Event	Athletes	Result	Rank	Result	Rank	Result	Rank
400 m hurdles	Sara Petersen	56.58	12 Q	56.07	9	did not advance	

Field events

Event	Athletes	Qualification		Final	
Event	Athletes	Result	Rank	Result	Rank
Pole vault	Caroline Bonde Holm	4.15	22	did not advance	
