= 2017 European Athletics U23 Championships – Women's 4 × 100 metres relay =

The women's 4 × 100 metres relay event at the 2017 European Athletics U23 Championships was held in Bydgoszcz, Poland, at Zdzisław Krzyszkowiak Stadium on 16 July.

== Medalists ==
Gold	Silver	Bronze
Spain; Paula Sevilla; Ane Petrirena; Lara Gómez; Cristina Lara	France; Maroussia Paré; Cynthia Leduc; Fanny Peltier; Amandine Brossier	Switzerland; Riccarda Dietsche; Sarah Atcho; Ajla Del Ponte; Géraldine Frey

== Results ==
=== Heats ===
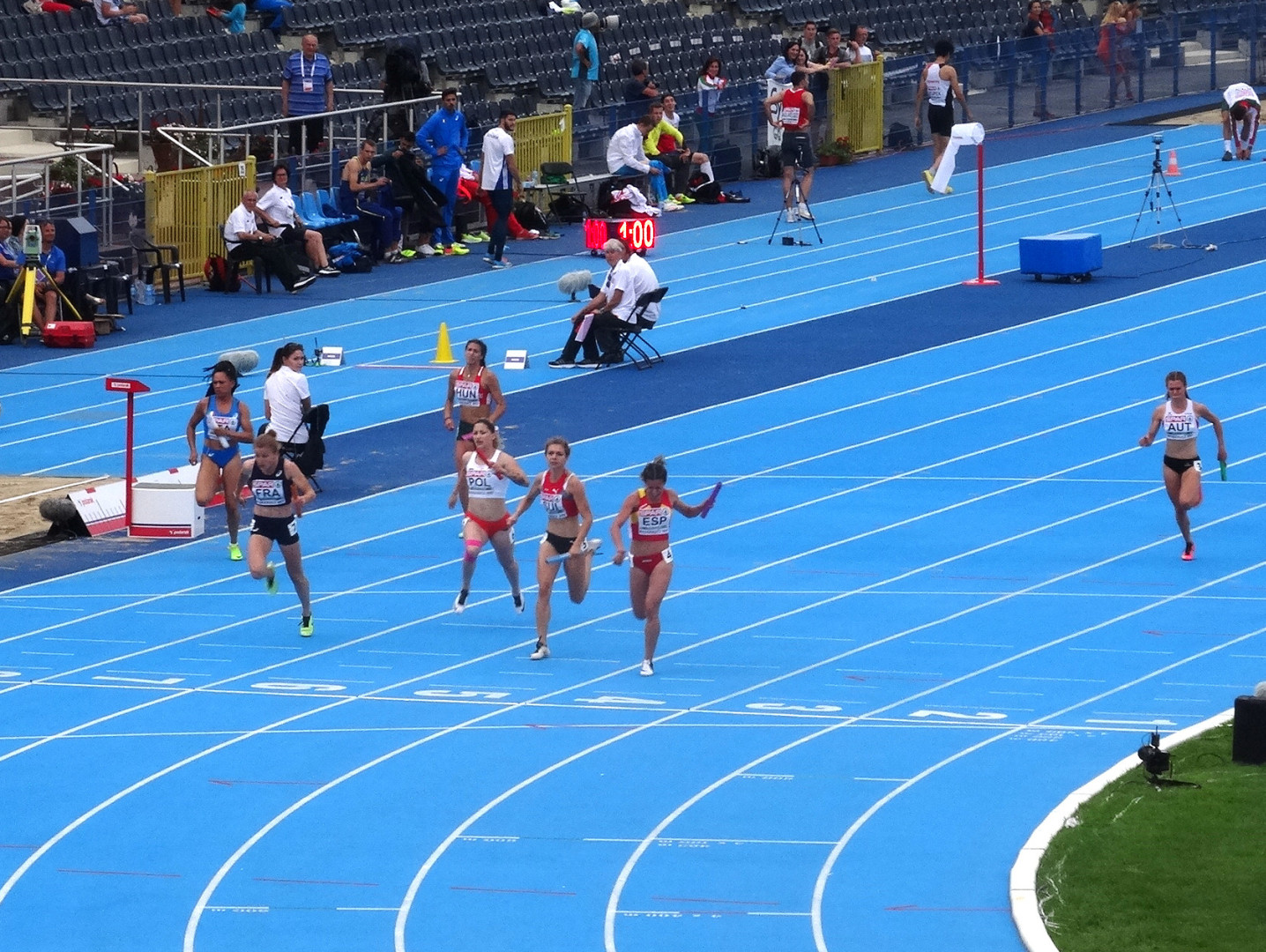
The final

16 July

Qualification rule: First 3 in each heat (Q) and the next 2 fastest (q) qualified for the final.

Rank	Heat	Nation	Athletes	Time	Notes
1	1	Switzerland	Riccarda Dietsche, Sarah Atcho, Ajla Del Ponte, Géraldine Frey	43.99	Q
2	2	Spain	Paula Sevilla, Ane Petrirena, Lara Gómez, Cristina Lara	44.42	Q
3	1	Poland	Ewa Ochocka, Kamila Ciba, Magdalena Wronka, Ewa Swoboda	44.53	Q
4	2	France	Maroussia Paré, Cynthia Leduc, Fanny Peltier, Amandine Brossier	44.56	Q
5	1	Hungary	Luca Kozák, Melinda Ferenczi, Petra Répási, Evelin Nádházy	45.20	Q
6	2	Italy	Chiara Torrisi, Alessia Niotta, Annalisa Spadotto Scott, Johanelis Herrera Abreu	45.39	Q
7	2	Austria	Julia Schwarzinger, Savannah Mapalagama, Bettina Rinderer, Alexandra Toth	50.97	q
	1	Germany	Sina Mayer, Lisa Marie Kwaiye, Jessica-Bianca Wessolly, Chantal Butzek	DNF	
	2	Great Britain	Diani Walker, Finette Agyapong, Ama Pipi, Clieo Stephenson	DNF	
	1	Czech Republic	Helena Jiranová, Barbora Dvořáková, Martina Hofmanová, Marcela Pírková	DQ	R170.7

=== Final ===
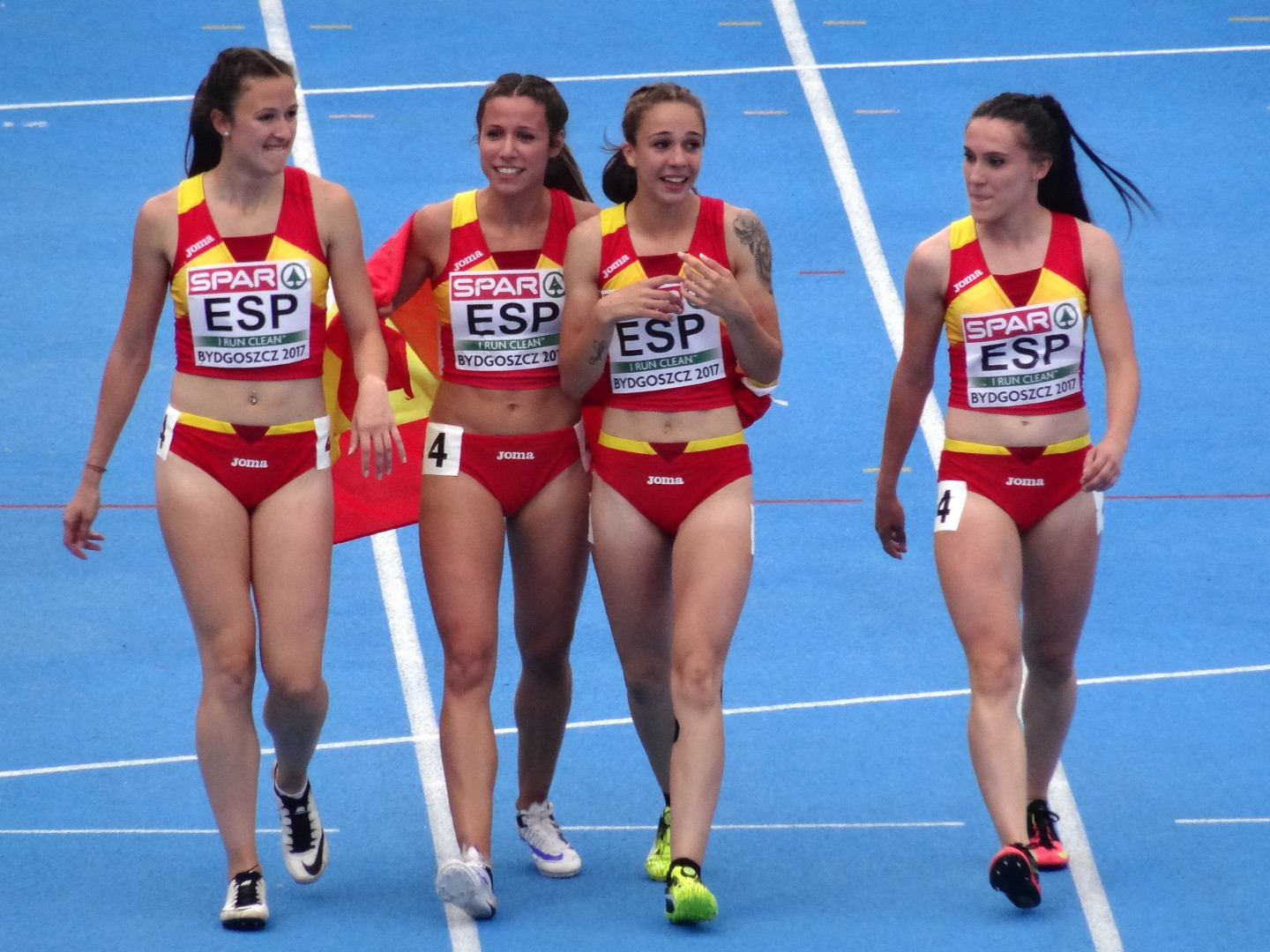
Gold medal winners – Spain

16 July

Rank	Lane	Nation	Athletes	Time	Notes
1st place, gold medalist(s)	4	Spain	Paula Sevilla, Ane Petrirena, Lara Gómez, Cristina Lara	43.96	
2nd place, silver medalist(s)	7	France	Maroussia Paré, Cynthia Leduc, Fanny Peltier, Amandine Brossier	44.06	
3rd place, bronze medalist(s)	5	Switzerland	Riccarda Dietsche, Sarah Atcho, Ajla Del Ponte, Géraldine Frey	44.07	
4	6	Poland	Ewa Ochocka, Kamila Ciba, Magdalena Wronka, Ewa Swoboda	44.21	
5	9	Italy	Chiara Torrisi, Alessia Niotta, Elisabetta De Andreis, Johanelis Herrera Abreu	44.70	
6	8	Hungary	Luca Kozák, Melinda Ferenczi, Petra Répási, Evelin Nádházy	45.03	
7	3	Austria	Julia Schwarzinger, Savannah Mapalagama, Bettina Rinderer, Alexandra Toth	45.08	
