= 2019 European Athletics U23 Championships – Women's 100 metres =

The women's 100 metres event at the 2019 European Athletics U23 Championships was held in Gävle, Sweden, at Gavlehof Stadium Park on 11 and 12 July.

== Records ==
Prior to the competition, the records were as follows:

European U23 record	Marlies Göhr (GDR)	10.88	Dresden, East Germany	1 July 1977
Championship U23 record	Maria Karastamati (GRE)	11.03	Erfurt, Germany	16 July 2005

== Results ==
=== Heats ===
Qualification rule: First 3 (Q) and the next 4 fastest (q) qualified for the semifinals.

Wind:
Heat 1: -1.8 m/s, Heat 2: -2.8 m/s, Heat 3: -4.2 m/s, Heat 4: -2.3 m/s

Rank	Heat	Name	Nationality	Time	Notes
1	1	Ewa Swoboda	Poland	11.48	Q
2	3	Cynthia Leduc	France	11.84	Q
3	1	Marina Andreea Baboi	Romania	11.87	Q
4	2	Lisa Nippgen	Germany	11.87	Q
5	1	Helene Rønningen	Norway	11.88	Q
6	1	Gina Akpe-Moses	Ireland	11.91	q
7	2	Géraldine Frey	Switzerland	11.94	Q
8	1	Jennifer Montag	Germany	11.94	q
9	2	Molly Scott	Ireland	11.98	Q
10	4	Diana Vaisman	Israel	11.98	Q
11	3	Ciara Neville	Ireland	12.00	Q
12	2	Patrizia van der Weken	Luxembourg	12.04	q
13	2	Nikola Bendová	Czech Republic	12.04	q
14	4	Claudia Payton	Sweden	12.06	Q
15	4	Lotta Kemppinen	Finland	12.07	Q
16	3	Sindija Bukša	Latvia	12.07	Q
17	1	Viktoriya Ratnikova	Ukraine	12.07	
18	3	Keshia Kwadwo	Germany	12.09	
19	2	Chiara Melon	Italy	12.11	
20	2	Ingvild Meinseth	Norway	12.11	
21	3	Zaynab Dosso	Italy	12.12	
22	4	Bowien Jansen	Netherlands	12.14	
23	1	Bettina Kéri	Hungary	12.34	
24	4	Laura Fattori	Italy	12.36	
25	3	Inola Blatty	Switzerland	12.40	
26	2	Petra Beáta Farkas	Hungary	12.45	
27	4	Lotti Hajdú	Hungary	12.55	
28	4	Coralie Ambrosini	Switzerland	12.57	
29	4	Ioana Gheorghe	Romania	12.62	
30	3	Julia Schwarzinger	Austria	12.69	
31	3	Ilona Chiabaut	Monaco	13.98	

=== Semifinals ===
12 July

Qualification rule: First 3 (Q) and the next 2 fastest (q) qualified for the final.

Wind:
Heat 1: -0.7 m/s, Heat 2: -1.4 m/s

Rank	Heat	Name	Nationality	Time	Notes
1	2	Ewa Swoboda	Poland	11.41	Q
2	1	Diana Vaisman	Israel	11.60	Q
3	1	Cynthia Leduc	France	11.62	Q
4	1	Ciara Neville	Ireland	11.75	Q
5	2	Lisa Nippgen	Germany	11.75	Q
6	1	Lotta Kemppinen	Finland	11.78	q
7	1	Molly Scott	Ireland	11.78	q
8	1	Géraldine Frey	Switzerland	11.79	
9	1	Patrizia van der Weken	Luxembourg	11.82	
10	2	Sindija Bukša	Latvia	11.83	Q
11	2	Marina Andreea Baboi	Romania	11.84	
12	2	Claudia Payton	Sweden	11.87	
13	2	Gina Akpe-Moses	Ireland	11.90	
14	1	Jennifer Montag	Germany	11.91	
15	2	Helene Rønningen	Norway	11.93	
16	2	Nikola Bendová	Czech Republic	11.98	

=== Final ===
12 July

Wind: +0.6 m/s

Rank	Lane	Name	Nationality	Time	Notes
1st place, gold medalist(s)	6	Ewa Swoboda	Poland	11.15	SB
2nd place, silver medalist(s)	4	Cynthia Leduc	France	11.40	
3rd place, bronze medalist(s)	5	Lisa Nippgen	Germany	11.45	
4	3	Diana Vaisman	Israel	11.48	
5	8	Ciara Neville	Ireland	11.57	=SB
6	2	Lotta Kemppinen	Finland	11.59	
7	7	Sindija Bukša	Latvia	11.64	
8	1	Molly Scott	Ireland	11.70	PB
