= 2019 European Athletics U23 Championships – Women's 4 × 100 metres relay =

The women's 4 × 100 metres relay event at the 2019 European Athletics U23 Championships was held in Gävle, Sweden, at Gavlehov Stadium Park on 14 July.

== Medalists ==
Gold	Silver	Bronze
Germany; Jennifer Montag; Keshia Kwadwo; Sophia Junk; Lisa Nippgen	France; Leisly Regulier; Eloise de la Taille; Estelle Raffai; Sarah Richard	Poland; Klaudia Siciarz; Marlena Gola; Martyna Kotwiła; Ewa Swoboda; Jagoda Mierzyńska*

*Athletes who ran in heats only

== Results ==
=== Heats ===
Qualification rule: First 3 in each heat (Q) and the next 2 fastest (q) qualified for the final.

Rank	Heat	Nation	Athletes	Time	Notes
1	1	Germany	Jennifer Montag, Keshia Kwadwo, Sophia Junk, Lisa Nippgen	43.45	Q, WU23R
2	2	Spain	Anna Obradors, Paula García, Paula Sevilla, Lara Gómez	43.99	Q, SB
3	2	France	Leisly Regulier, Eloise de la Taille, Estelle Raffai, Sarah Richard	44.18	Q
4	2	Great Britain	Melissa Roberts, Alisha Rees, Hannah Brier, Shannon Malone	44.27	Q, SB
5	1	Poland	Jagoda Mierzyńska, Marlena Gola, Klaudia Siciarz, Ewa Swoboda	44.43	Q, SB
6	1	Italy	Zaynab Dosso, Sofia Bonicalza, Laura Fattori, Chiara Melon	44.71	Q
7	2	Ireland	Gina Akpe-Moses, Ciara Neville, Sarah Quinn, Molly Scott	44.79	q
8	1	Switzerland	Inola Blatty, Silke Lemmens, Coralie Ambrosini, Géraldine Frey	44.80	q
9	2	Hungary	Bettina Kéri, Klaudia Sorok, Jusztina Csóti, Lotti Hajdú	44.93	NU23R
10	1	Norway	Ingvild Meinseth, Marte Pettersen, Tonje Fjellet Kristiansen, Helene Rønningen	45.04	NU23R
11	1	Sweden	Claudia Payton, Emma Jansson, Amanda Hansson, Maja Almgren	45.17	SB
12	1	Austria	Karin Strametz, Julia Schwarzinger, Katharina Haberditz, Ina Huemer	45.84	SB
13	2	Romania	Cristina Gabriela Iacoban, Andrea Miklós, Ioana Gheorghe, Marina Andreea Baboi	45.96	SB

=== Final ===
Rank	Lane	Nation	Athletes	Time	Notes
1st place, gold medalist(s)	5	Germany	Jennifer Montag, Keshia Kwadwo, Sophia Junk, Lisa Nippgen	43.45	=WU23R
2nd place, silver medalist(s)	6	France	Leisly Regulier, Eloise de la Taille, Estelle Raffai, Sarah Richard	43.82	
3rd place, bronze medalist(s)	3	Poland	Klaudia Siciarz, Marlena Gola, Martyna Kotwiła, Ewa Swoboda	44.08	SB
4	1	Ireland	Molly Scott, Ciara Neville, Sharlene Mawdsley, Gina Akpe-Moses	44.32	
5	7	Great Britain	Melissa Roberts, Alisha Rees, Hannah Brier, Shannon Malone	44.54	
6	4	Spain	Anna Obradors, Paula García, Paula Sevilla, Lara Gómez	44.56	
7	8	Italy	Zaynab Dosso, Sofia Bonicalza, Laura Fattori, Chiara Melon	45.29	
8	2	Switzerland	Inola Blatty, Silke Lemmens, Coralie Ambrosini, Géraldine Frey	45.64	
