= Fanny Peltier =

French sprinter

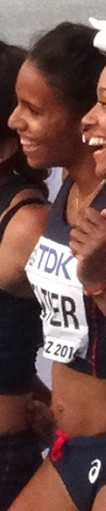
- Peltier at the 2016 World U20 Championships in Athletics

Personal information
- Nationality: French
- Born: 25 May 1997 (age 29)
- Home town: Montpellier

Sport
- Sport: Athletics
- Event(s): 200 metres, 400 metres, 4 × 100 metres relay
- Club: Entente Sud Lyonnais
- Coached by: Dimitri Demoniere; Djamel Boudebibah

Achievements and titles
- Personal bests: 400m: 52.13 (2023); 200m: 23.13 (+1.3) (2017); 100m: 12.02 (+0.4) (2015)
Medal record
Women's athletics
Representing France
World U20 Championships
Silver medal – second place	2016 Bydgoszcz	4 × 100 m
European U23 Championships
Silver medal – second place	2017 Bydgoszcz	4 × 100 m

Fanny Peltier (born 25 May 1997) is a French sprinter. She won silver medals running for the French 4 × 100 m relay team at the 2016 World U20 Championships and the 2017 European U23 Championships.

== Biography ==
Peltier was born and raised in Montpellier, France. She won her first national junior title at the age of 17 in the 200 m.

In 2016, Peltier won her first international medal at the World U20 Championships in Bydgoszcz. Running with Tamara Murcia, Cynthia Leduc, and Estelle Raffai, she helped her team to a 44.05 second clocking and a silver medal.

In 2018, Peltier joined a training group under coach Dimitri Demoniere that includes European 100 m record holder Jimmy Vicaut.

From 2019 to 2021, Peltier was injured eight times. She started to come back to form in 2022, and in 2023 she set the French record in the mixed 4 × 400 metres relay.

== Statistics ==
=== Personal bests ===
Event	Mark	Competition	Venue	Date
400 metres	52.13	Desert Heat Classic	Tucson, Arizona	29 April 2023
200 metres	23.13 (+1.3 m/s)	2017 European Athletics U23 Championships	Bydgoszcz, Poland	15 July 2017
100 metres	12.02 (+0.4 m/s)		Les Abymes, France	6 June 2015
