= 2017 European Athletics U23 Championships – Women's 100 metres =

The women's 100 metres event at the 2017 European Athletics U23 Championships was held in Bydgoszcz, Poland, at Zdzisław Krzyszkowiak Stadium on 13 and 14 July.

== Medalists ==
Gold	Ewa Swoboda; Poland
Silver	Krystsina Tsimanouskaya; Belarus
Bronze	Sina Mayer; Germany

== Records ==
Prior to the competition, the records were as follows:

European U23 record	Ivet Lalova (BUL)	11.00	Athens, Greece	21 August 2004
Championship U23 record	Maria Karastamati (GRE)	11.03	Erfurt, Germany	16 July 2005

== Results ==
=== Heats ===
13 July

Qualification rule: First 3 (Q) and the next 4 fastest (q) qualified for the semifinals.

Wind:
Heat 1: -0.4 m/s, Heat 2: +1.2 m/s, Heat 3: +1.6 m/s, Heat 4: +3.2 m/s

Rank	Heat	Name	Nationality	Time	Notes
1	4	Ewa Swoboda	Poland	11.26	Q
2	4	Lisa Marie Kwaiye	Germany	11.47	Q
3	4	Ajla Del Ponte	Switzerland	11.47	Q
4	3	Kristina Sivkova	Authorised Neutral Athlete	11.52	Q
5	2	Floriane Gnafoua	France	11.55	Q
6	3	Sina Mayer	Germany	11.58	Q
7	2	Krystsina Tsimanouskaya	Belarus	11.63	Q
8	4	Sindija Bukša	Latvia	11.63	q
9	4	Charlotte Jeanne	France	11.68	q
10	1	Cynthia Leduc	France	11.70	Q
11	3	Karolina Deliautaitė	Lithuania	11.71	Q, PB
12	1	Imani Lansiquot	Great Britain	11.72	Q
13	2	Kamila Ciba	Poland	11.73	Q
14	3	Olivia Fotopoulou	Cyprus	11.74	q
15	4	Chiara Torrisi	Italy	11.77	q
15	4	Anniina Kortetmaa	Finland	11.77	
17	1	Lisa Nippgen	Germany	11.77	Q
18	3	Zorana Barjaktarović	Serbia	11.78	
19	3	Johanelis Herrera Abreu	Italy	11.93	
20	1	Alexandra Toth	Austria	11.93	
21	2	Paula Sevilla	Spain	11.99	
22	3	Anastasiya Holeneva	Ukraine	12.05	
23	2	Elisabetta De Andreis	Italy	12.06	
24	1	Géraldine Frey	Switzerland	12.12	
25	1	Nikoleta Šimić	Serbia	12.16	
26	2	Sarah McCarthy	Ireland	12.19	
27	2	Diana Podoleanu	Moldova	12.21	
28	1	Marije van Hunenstijn	Netherlands	12.23	
29	3	Rachel Fitz	Malta	12.62	

=== Semifinals ===
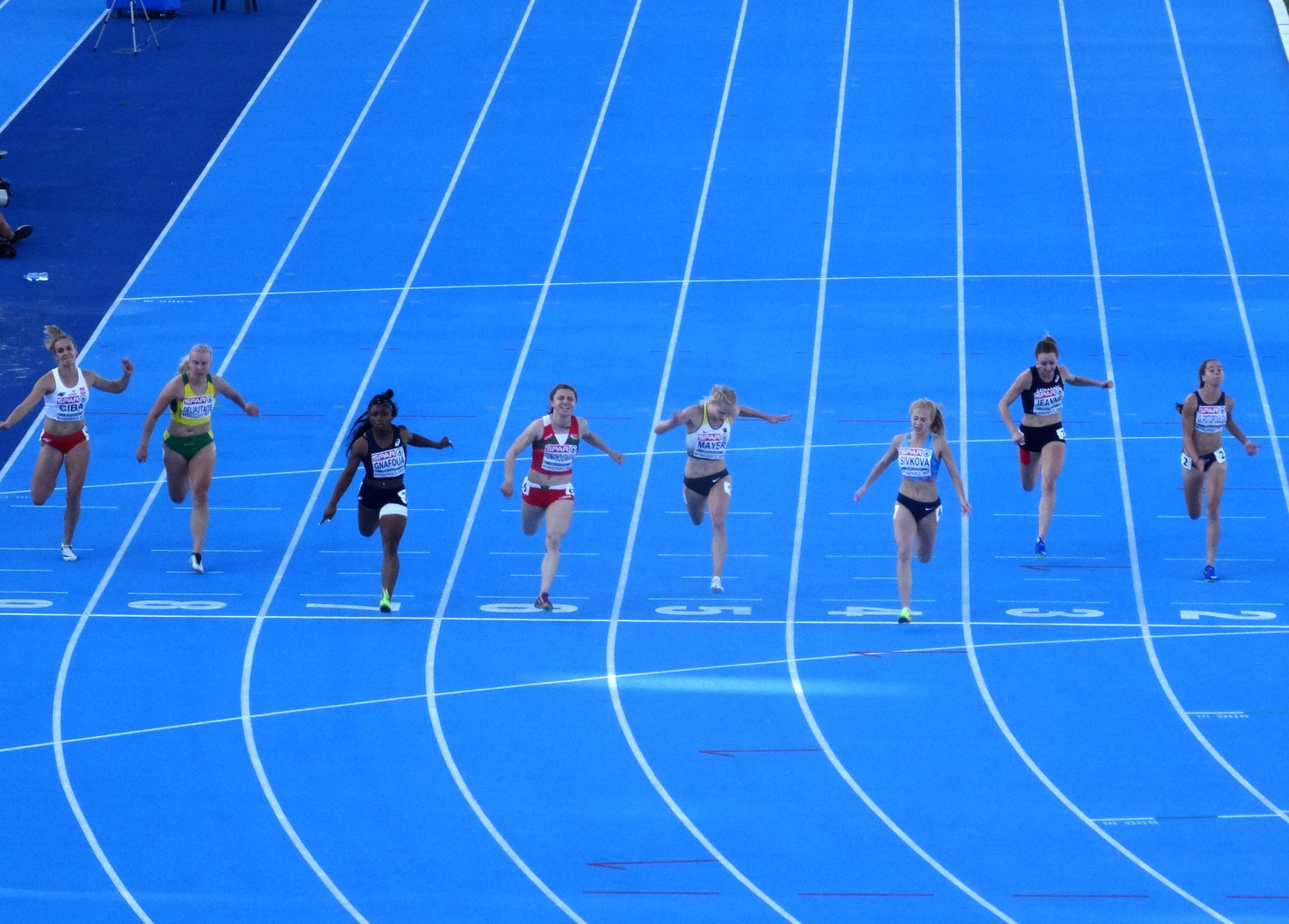
Semifinal 1

13 July

Qualification rule: First 3 (Q) and the next 2 fastest (q) qualified for the final.

Wind:
Heat 1: +0.3 m/s, Heat 2: +0.3 m/s

Rank	Heat	Name	Nationality	Time	Notes
1	2	Ewa Swoboda	Poland	11.32	Q, SB
2	1	Kristina Sivkova	Authorised Neutral Athlete	11.42	Q
3	1	Floriane Gnafoua	France	11.44	Q
4	1	Krystsina Tsimanouskaya	Belarus	11.46	Q
5	2	Imani Lansiquot	Great Britain	11.47	Q
6	2	Ajla Del Ponte	Switzerland	11.49	Q
7	1	Sina Mayer	Germany	11.50	q
8	2	Lisa Nippgen	Germany	11.55	q
9	2	Lisa Marie Kwaiye	Germany	11.57	
10	2	Cynthia Leduc	France	11.62	
11	2	Sindija Bukša	Latvia	11.62	PB
12	1	Karolina Deliautaitė	Lithuania	11.67	PB
13	1	Olivia Fotopoulou	Cyprus	11.68	
14	1	Kamila Ciba	Poland	11.69	
15	1	Charlotte Jeanne	France	11.76	
16	2	Chiara Torrisi	Italy	11.81	

=== Final ===
14 July

Wind:-0.6 m/s

Rank	Lane	Name	Nationality	Time	Notes
1st place, gold medalist(s)	7	Ewa Swoboda	Poland	11.42	
2nd place, silver medalist(s)	9	Krystsina Tsimanouskaya	Belarus	11.54	
3rd place, bronze medalist(s)	2	Sina Mayer	Germany	11.58	
4	6	Imani Lansiquot	Great Britain	11.58	
5	8	Ajla Del Ponte	Switzerland	11.66	
6	5	Kristina Sivkova	Authorised Neutral Athlete	11.67	
7	3	Lisa Nippgen	Germany	11.72	
	4	Floriane Gnafoua	France	DNF	
