= Géraldine Di Tizio-Frey =

Swiss sprinter (born 1997)

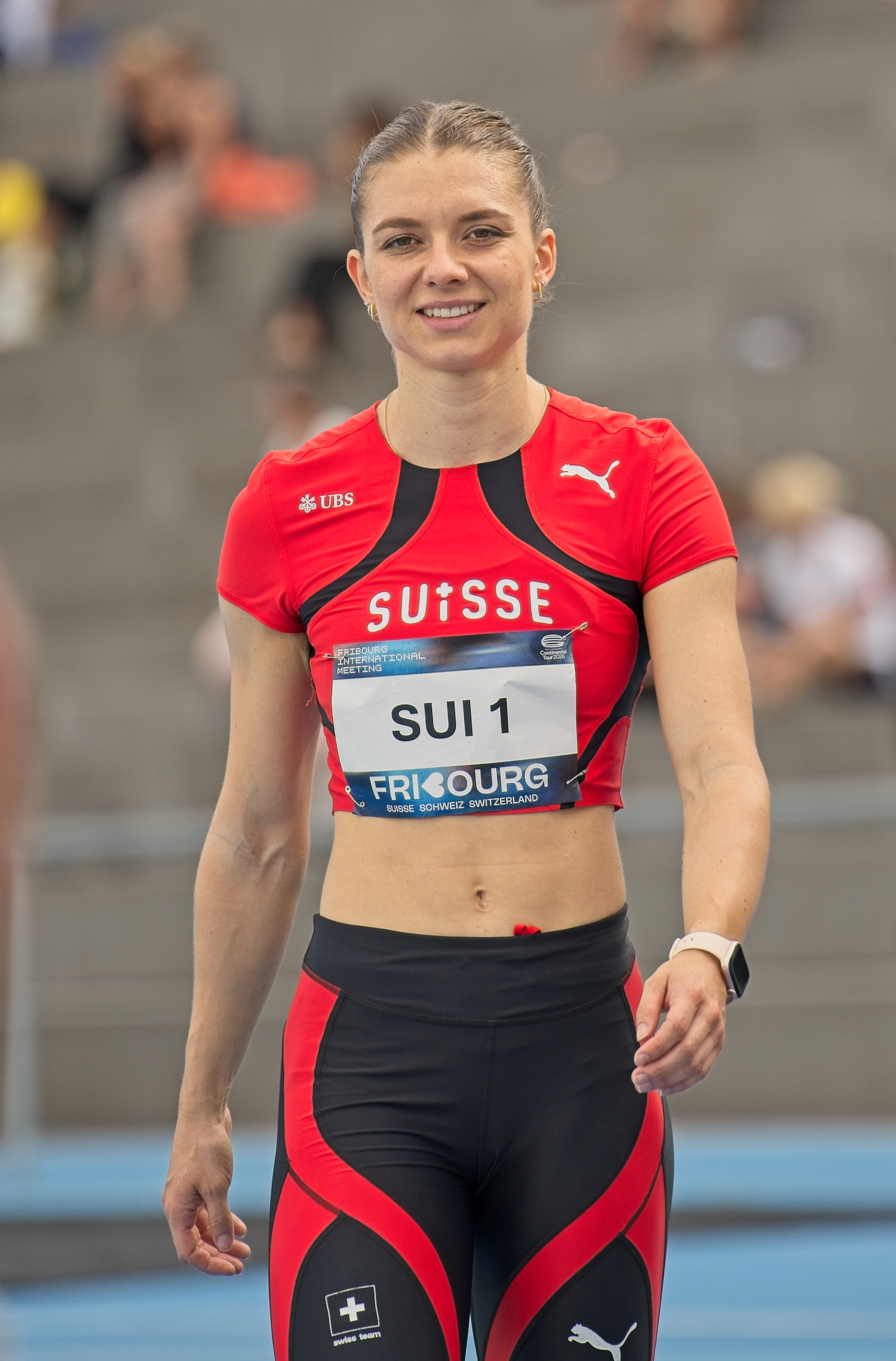

Personal information
- Nationality: Swiss
- Born: Géraldine Frey; 19 June 1997 (age 29) Zug, Switzerland
- Height: 172 cm (5 ft 8 in)

Sport
- Country: Switzerland
- Sport: Track and Field
- Events: 60 m, 100 m, 200 m
- Club: LK Zug
- Coached by: Patrick Saile (since 2026), Lucio Di Tizio (2016-2026)

Achievements and titles
- Personal bests: 60 m: 7.11 (Belgrade 2021); 100 m: 10.96 (Zürich 2026); 200 m: 23.12 (Zürich 2022)
Medal record
Women's athletics
Representing Switzerland
European Championships
Silver medal – second place	2026 Birmingham	4×100 m relay
European Athletics Team Championships
Silver medal – second place	2021 Cluj-Napoca	4 × 100 m relay
European U23 Championships
Bronze medal – third place	2017 Bydgoszcz	4 × 100 m relay

Géraldine Di Tizio-Frey (née Frey; born 19 June 1997) is a Swiss track and field athlete. She has won Swiss national titles over 100 metres, 200 metres and indoors over 60 metres, and has competed at multiple major championships, including the 2024 Olympic Games.

== Early life ==
From Unterägeri in the Swiss canton of Zug, she moved to Zürich to study pharmacy at ETH Zurich. She trained with Lucio Di Tizio and since 2026 has been working with Swiss National Coach Patrick Saile.

== Career ==
Frey was part of the Swiss team that won the bronze medal at the 2017 European Athletics U23 Championships in Bydgoszcz, Poland in the women's 4 × 100 m relay. She also competed in 2015 and 2019 at the European U23 Championships.

In January 2022, Frey ran 7.60 seconds for the 60 metres in St Gallen to qualify for the 2022 World Athletics Indoor Championships in Belgrade. She ran a personal best time of 7.11 seconds for the 60 metres to qualify for the semi-final. Frey won the 2022 Swiss National Championships over 200 metres, at the Letzigrund in Zürich. In doing so, Frey ran a new personal best time of 23.12 seconds. Frey was part of the Swiss relay team that finished seventh at the 2022 World Athletics Championships in the 4 × 100 m relay final. She was selected for the 100 metres at the 2022 European Athletics Championships in Munich. She ran 11.45 seconds in her heat to qualify for the semi-finals. Selected for the 2023 World Athletics Championships in Budapest, Frey qualified for the semi-final of the women's 100 metres.

In March 2024, Frey reached the semi-finals of the women's 60 metres at the 2024 World Athletics Indoor Championships in Glasgow. That spring, Frey ran as part of the Swiss 4 × 100 m relay team which qualified for the 2024 Paris Olympics at the 2024 World Relays Championships in Nassau, Bahamas. She was selected for the 2024 European Athletics Championships in Rome in June 2024. She competed in the 100 metres at the 2024 Paris Olympics.

Frey reached the semi-finals of the 60 metres at the 2025 World Athletics Indoor Championships in Nanjing, China, in March 2025. On 13 August 2025, Frey ran a new 100 m personal best of 11.09 s at the Fribourg International Meeting, becoming the fourth fastest Swiss woman in history. In September, she was a semi-finalist in the 100 metres at the 2025 World Championships in Tokyo, Japan. She also ran in the women's 4 × 100 metres relay at the championships.

On 1 March 2026, she placed third at the Swiss Indoor Championships over 60 metres, running 7.16 seconds in the final. Later that summer, she ran a new personal hest for the 100 metres of 10.98 seconds at the Meeting de la Gruyère in Bulle. Now running under her married name Géraldine Di Tizio-Frey, on 25 July 2026 won the Swiss 100 metres title in Zurich in 10.96 seconds, moving into the European-lead for the season. The time improved on her previous personal best of 10.98 seconds, which she had set two weeks earlier in Bulle. At the same meeting in Bulle, she had recorded a faster time of 10.91 seconds; however, the performance was not eligible for official record purposes because the tailwind of 3.0 m/s exceeded the permitted limit of 2.0 m/s. Competing at the 2026 European Championships in Birmingham, England, the following month, she placed fourth with a time of 11.07 seconds in the final of the 100 metres, 0.01 behind the bronze medal winner Delphine Nkansa of Belgium. In the semi-final, she clocked 11.02 seconds, the second-fastest time at the European Championships. Her European season's best time remained untouched. On 15 August 2026 she ran the first leg and won a silver medal with the 4 × 100 m relay at those same European Championships. With a time of 43.12 seconds it was the first international relay medal for the Swiss team.

== Achievements ==
Information from her World Athletics profile unless otherwise noted.

=== International competitions ===
Year	Competition	Venue	Position	Event	Time	Notes
Representing Switzerland
2015	European U20 Championships	Eskilstuna, Sweden	5th (h)	4 × 100 m relay	45.89	
2017	European U23 Championships	Bydgoszcz, Poland	25th (h)	100 m	12.12	
2017	European U23 Championships	Bydgoszcz, Poland	3rd	4 × 100 m relay	44.07	
2019	European U23 Championships	Gävle, Sweden	8th (sf)	100 m	11.79	
2019	European U23 Championships	Gävle, Sweden	8th	4 × 100 m relay	45.64	
2021	European Team Championships First League	Cluj-Napoca, Romania	2nd	4 × 100 m relay	43.73	
2022	World Indoor Championships	Belgrade, Serbia	9th (sf)	60 m	7.15	
2022	World Championships	Eugene, OR, United States	34th (h)	100 m	11.30	
2022	World Championships	Eugene, OR, United States	7th	4 × 100 m relay	42.81	
2022	European Championships	Munich, Germany	10th (sf)	100 m	11.38	
2022	European Championships	Munich, Germany	9th (h)	4 × 100 m relay	43.93	
2023	European Team Championships First Division	Chorzów, Poland	5th	100 m	11.26	
2023	European Team Championships First Division	Chorzów, Poland	13th	200 m	23.57	
2023	European Team Championships First Division	Chorzów, Poland	11th	4 × 100 m relay	43.39	
2023	World Championships	Budapest, Hungary	24th (sf)	100 m	11.28	
2023	World Championships	Budapest, Hungary	— (f)	4 × 100 m relay	DQ	
2024	World Indoor Championships	Glasgow, United Kingdom	12th (sf)	60 m	7.16	
2024	European Championships	Rome, Italy	16th (sf)	100 m	11.29	
2024	European Championships	Rome, Italy	5th (h)	4 × 100 m relay	42.76^{1}	
2024	Olympic Games	Paris, France	38th (h)	100 m	11.34	
2025	European Indoor Championships	Apeldoorn, Netherlands	9th (sf)	60 m	7.13	
2025	World Indoor Championships	Nanjing, China	13th (sf)	60 m	7.24	
2025	World Championships	Tokyo, Japan	23rd (sf)	100 m	11.34	
2025	World Championships	Tokyo, Japan	–	4 × 100 m relay	DNF	^{1}Disqualified in the final
2026	European Chmapionships	Birmingham, United Kingdom	4th	100 m	11.07	
2026	European Chmapionships	Birmingham, United Kingdom	2nd	4 × 100 m relay	43.15	

=== Circuit wins and titles ===
- Diamond League

(4 × 100 metres relay wins, other events specified in parentheses)

- 2022 (2): Stockholm Bauhaus-Galan (MR), Lausanne Athletissima

=== National titles ===
- Swiss Championships
  - 200 metres: 2022
  - 100 metres: 2026
  - 60 metres: 2024

== See also ==
- List of Swiss records in athletics
