= Hannah Brier =

British sprinter (born 1998)

Personal information
- Nationality: British (Welsh)
- Born: 3 February 1998 (age 28)

Sport
- Sport: Running
- University team: Loughborough
- Club: Swansea Harriers

Achievements and titles
- National finals: 2022 Indoor, 2023 Indoor
- Commonwealth finals: 2014, 2022
- Personal best(s): 200 m: 11.26 (London, 2025)
Medal record
Representing Great Britain
British Indoor Athletics Championships
Gold medal – first place	2022 Birmingham	200m
Silver medal – second place	2023 Birmingham	200m

Hannah Brier (born 3 February 1998) is a British sprinter who won the 200 metres event at the 2022 British Indoor Athletics Championships. She competed at the 2014 and 2022 Commonwealth Games.

== Career ==
Brier trains at Swansea Harriers Athletics Club, and has previously competed for Loughborough. As a youngster, Brier held seven Welsh age groups records, including in the long jump event. In May 2014, Brier, Mica Moore, Hannah Thomas, and Rachel Johncock broke the Welsh 4 × 100 metres relay national record at the Loughborough International event.

At the age of 16, she competed for Wales at the 2014 Commonwealth Games. It was her first senior level international competition. She was initially only selected for the 4 × 100 metres relay event, but was later additionally chosen for the individual 100 metres competition. She finished fifth in her heat, and did not qualify for the semi-finals. The Welsh relay team finished seventh in their final. At the 2015 England Athletics Indoor Under-20s Championships, she set a Welsh under-20s record time of 11.44 seconds for the 100 metres event. Later in the year, she competed at the 2015 World Youth Championships in Athletics. She was included in the 2015–2016 British Athletics Futures Programme.

In 2016, she won the 100 metres event at the Welsh National Championships. That year, she competed at the 2016 IAAF World U20 Championships, coming sixth in the 100 metres event and was part of the British team that did not finish in their heat of the 4 × 100 metres relay. Brier won the 60 metres events at the 2017 and 2018 British Universities and Colleges Sport Indoor Championships, and the 60 metres event at the 2017 England Athletics Indoor Under-20s Championships. She was part of the British relay team that came sixth in the 4 × 100 metres relay event at the 2019 European Athletics U23 Championships.

Brier won the 200 metres event at the 2022 British Indoor Athletics Championships. It was her tenth consecutive win of the season at indoor events. She won the 100 metres event at the 2022 Welsh National Championships, in a wind-assisted time of 11.38 seconds. At the 2022 British Athletics Championships, Brier set the Welsh national 100 metres record. She ran her heat in 11.33 seconds, which was 0.06 seconds faster than the previous record held jointly by herself, Sallyanne Short and Elaine O'Neill.

Brier was selected in the Welsh team for the 2022 Commonwealth Games. Her brother Joe Brier was also selected for the Games, and they were one of four pairs of Welsh siblings scheduled to compete. At the Games, she finished last in her semi-final of the 100 metres, and sixth in her semi-final of the 200 metres competition. Brier finished second in the 200 metres event at the 2023 British Indoor Athletics Championships in a personal best time of 23.60 seconds.

In 2023, Brier considered retiring from athletics, but chose not to do so. In 2024, she won the 400 metres event at the Welsh Indoor Championships, and set a personal best time of 53.36 seconds at the British Indoor Athletics Championships. She was the only Welsh person selected for the 2024 World Athletics Indoor Championships. Brier was in the British squad for the 4 × 400 metres relay, but did not compete.

== Personal life ==
Brier studied at Loughborough University, and later studied for an MSc at Cardiff Metropolitan University. Her brother Joe is an international sprinter, and her mother also ran for Swansea Harriers.
