= 2019 European Athletics U23 Championships – Women's shot put =

The women's shot put event at the 2019 European Athletics U23 Championships will be held in Gävle, Sweden, at Gavlehov Stadium Park on 12 and 13 July.

== Medalists ==
Gold	Silver	Bronze
Alina Kenzel; Germany	Katharina Maisch; Germany	Julia Ritter; Germany

== Results ==
=== Qualification ===
Qualification rule: 16.00 (Q) or the 12 best results (q) qualified for the final.

Rank	Group	Name	Nationality	#1	#2	#3	Results	Notes
1	A	Julia Ritter	Germany	17.32			17.32	Q
2	B	Katharina Maisch	Germany	17.12			17.12	Q
3	A	Alina Kenzel	Germany	16.45			16.45	Q
4	B	Benthe König	Netherlands	16.28			16.28	Q
5	A	Divine Oladipo	Great Britain	16.15			16.15	Q
6	B	Maja Ślepowrońska	Poland	16.09			16.09	Q
7	A	Jessica Schilder	Netherlands	15.44	16.00		16.00	Q
8	B	Violetta Veiland	Hungary	15.23	15.45	15.58	15.58	q
9	B	Eveliina Rouvali	Finland	15.52	x	15.01	15.52	q
10	B	Sydney Giampietro	Italy	15.23	15.45	x	15.45	q, SB
11	A	Aysel Yılmaz	Turkey	15.23	14.58	14.93	15.23	q, PB
12	A	Michella Obijiaku	Italy	x	14.19	15.16	15.16	q
13	B	Sofia Kaisidou	Greece	14.66	15.06	14.69	15.06	
14	A	Martina Carnevale	Italy	14.93	14.79	15.01	15.01	
15	B	Sinem Yıldırım	Turkey	14.55	x	14.48	14.55	
16	A	Thea Jensen	Denmark	x	14.31	x	14.31	
17	B	Michaela Walsh	Ireland	14.06	14.12	14.16	14.16	
18	A	Marija Šyvytė	Lithuania	13.53	x	13.81	13.81	
19	B	Lāsma Padedze	Latvia	12.24	12.28	13.58	13.58	
		Solène Ndama	France				DNS	

=== Final ===
Rank	Name	Nationality	#1	#2	#3	#4	#5	#6	Result	Notes
1st place, gold medalist(s)	Alina Kenzel	Germany	16.76	17.31	x	17.30	17.94	17.74	17.94	
2nd place, silver medalist(s)	Katharina Maisch	Germany	16.74	16.22	17.64	17.59	16.83	17.62	17.64	
3rd place, bronze medalist(s)	Julia Ritter	Germany	16.97	x	17.06	x	17.17	17.10	17.17	
4	Divine Oladipo	Great Britain	15.84	16.38	16.79	x	x	x	16.79	SB
5	Jessica Schilder	Netherlands	16.06	16.46	16.21	16.28	x	16.51	16.51	
6	Benthe König	Netherlands	x	16.24	x	x	16.19	16.37	16.37	
7	Maja Ślepowrońska	Poland	15.37	15.96	x	15.94	x	15.95	15.96	
8	Eveliina Rouvali	Finland	15.04	15.16	15.70	15.45	x	x	15.70	
9	Michella Obijiaku	Italy	15.51	x	15.56				15.56	
10	Sydney Giampietro	Italy	14.86	15.21	15.27				15.27	
11	Violetta Veiland	Hungary	14.64	15.25	15.16				15.25	
12	Aysel Yılmaz	Turkey	14.27	x	14.84				14.84	
