= 2019 IAAF World Relays – Women's 4 × 200 metres relay =

Women's 4 × 200 metres relay at the 2019 IAAF World Relays
- Venue: Nissan Stadium
- Dates: 12 May (final)
- Nations: 9
- Winning time: 1:20.12

Medalists
gold medal	Carolle Zahi; Estelle Raffai; Cynthia Leduc; Maroussia Paré	France
silver medal	Liang Xiaojing; Wei Yongli; Kong Lingwei; Ge Manqi	China
bronze medal	Elaine Thompson; Stephenie Ann McPherson; Shelly-Ann Fraser-Pryce; Shericka Jackson	Jamaica

The women's 4 × 200 metres relay at the 2019 IAAF World Relays was held at the Nissan Stadium on 12 May.

== Records ==
Prior to the competition, the records were as follows:

World record	United States Blue (LaTasha Jenkins, LaTasha Colander, Nanceen Perry, Marion Jones)	1:27.46	Philadelphia, United States	29 April 2000
Championship record	Jamaica (Jura Levy, Shericka Jackson, Shashalee Forbes, Elaine Thompson)	1:29.04	(The Bahamas) Nassau, Bahamas	22 April 2017
World Leading	Pure Athletics	1:29.25	Gainesville, United States	30 March 2019

== Results ==
KEY:	Q	Qualified	q	Fastest non-qualifiers	WL	World leading	CR	Championship record	NR	National record	SB	Seasonal best

Rank	Lane	Nation	Athletes	Time	Notes	Points
1st place, gold medalist(s)	9	France	Carolle Zahi, Estelle Raffai, Cynthia Leduc, Maroussia Paré	1:32.16	NR	8
2nd place, silver medalist(s)	6	China	Liang Xiaojing, Wei Yongli, Kong Lingwei, Ge Manqi	1:32.76	AR	7
3rd place, bronze medalist(s)	5	Jamaica	Elaine Thompson, Stephenie Ann McPherson, Shelly-Ann Fraser-Pryce, Shericka Jackson	1:33.21	SB	6
4	8	Japan	Miku Yamada, Naoka Miyake, Mei Kodama, Shuri Aono	1:34.57	NR	5
5	7	Germany	Jennifer Montag, Katrin Fehm, Sophia Junk, Jessica-Bianca Wessolly	1:34.92		4
6	6	Ecuador	Virginia Villalba, Anahí Suárez, Marizol Landázuri, Ángela Tenorio	1:35.91	NR	3
7	7	Papua New Guinea	Leonie Beu, Isila Manukip Apkup, Edna Boafob, Adrine Monagi	1:43.85	NR	2
	2	Kenya	Eunice Kadogo, Milcent Ndoro, Joan Cherono, Frashia Wangari Mwangi	DNF		0
	4	United States	Kyra Jefferson, Shania Collins, Gabrielle Thomas, Jenna Prandini	DQ	R170.7	0
