= Ajla Del Ponte =

Swiss sprinter (born 1996)

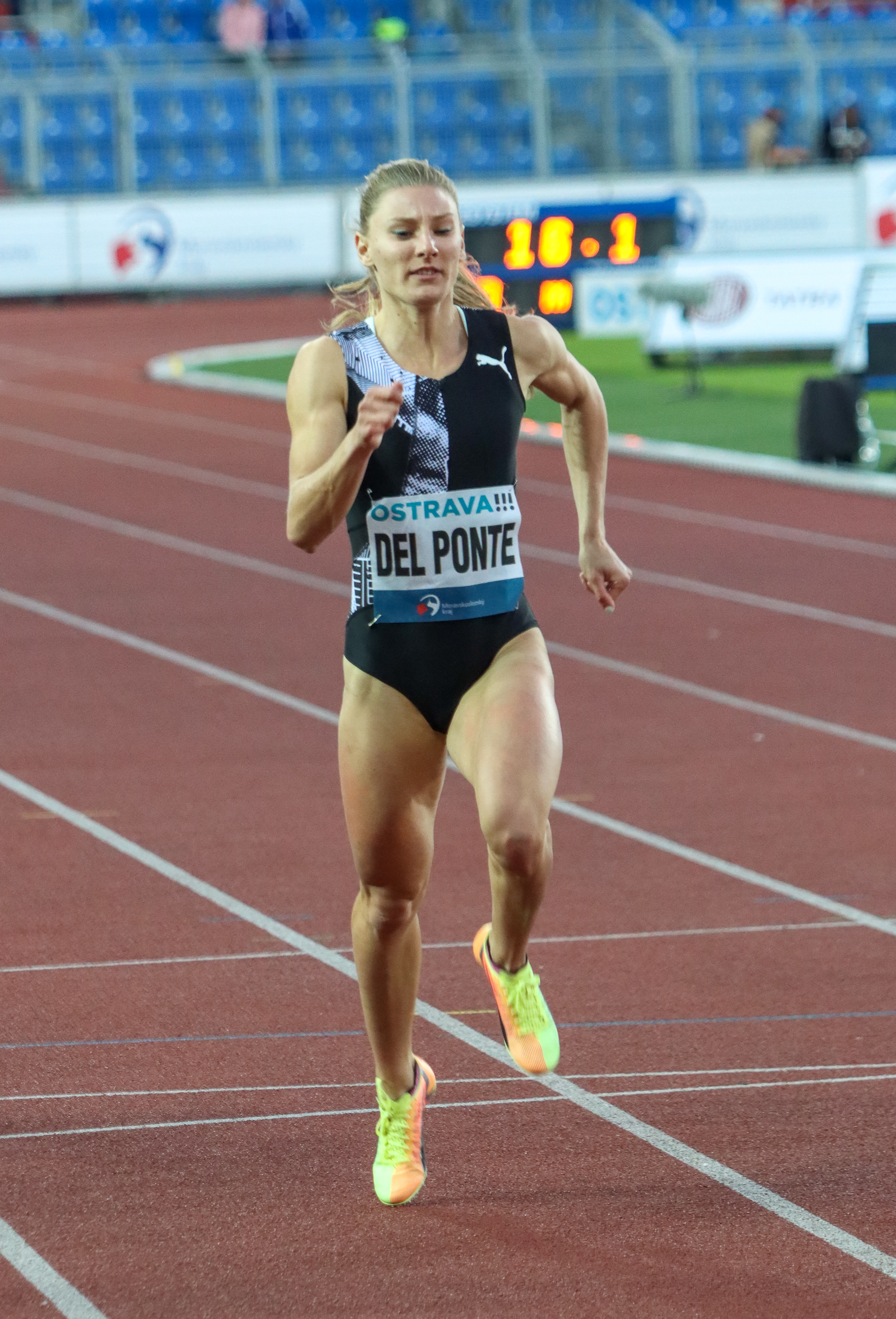
- Ajla Del Ponte in 2020

Personal information
- Nationality: Swiss
- Born: 15 July 1996 (age 30) Locarno, Switzerland

Sport
- Country: Switzerland
- Sport: Track and field
- Event: Sprints
- Coached by: Laurent Meuwly

Achievements and titles
- Personal bests: 100 m: 10.90 (2021); 60 m: 7.03 (2021)
Medal record
Women's athletics
Representing Switzerland
European Championships
Silver medal – second place	2026 Birmingham	4 × 100 m relay
European Indoor Championships
Gold medal – first place	2021 Toruń	60 m

Ajla Del Ponte (born 15 July 1996) is a Swiss sprinter. She competed in the women's 4 × 100 metres relay event at the 2016 Summer Olympics and at the 2017 World Championships in London. She won the women's 60 metres at the 2021 European Athletics Indoor Championships, doing so in a world leading time and equaling the Swiss record of 7.03 seconds. At the 2020 Summer Olympics she set a new national record for the 100 metres running 10.91 in the heats. On 14 August, she shaved a hundredth of a second off of her record, achieving a time of 10.90 at the 2021 Resisprint International.

== International competitions ==
Year	Competition	Venue	Position	Event	Notes
Representing Switzerland
2014	World Junior Championships	Eugene, United States	37th (h)	100 m	11.99
2014	World Junior Championships	Eugene, United States	5th	4 × 100 m relay	45.02
2015	European Junior Championships	Eskilstuna, Sweden	19th (h)	200 m	24.64
2016	European Championships	Amsterdam, Netherlands	5th	4 × 100 m relay	43.00
2016	Olympic Games	Rio de Janeiro, Brazil	11th (h)	4 × 100 m relay	43.02
2017	European Indoor Championships	Belgrade, Serbia	13th (sf)	60 m	7.39
2017	European U23 Championships	Bydgoszcz, Poland	5th	100 m	11.66
2017	European U23 Championships	Bydgoszcz, Poland	3rd	4 × 100 m relay	44.07
2017	World Championships	London, United Kingdom	5th	4 × 100 m relay	42.51
2018	World Indoor Championships	Birmingham, United Kingdom	23rd (sf)	60 m	7.40
2018	European Championships	Berlin, Germany	17th (sf)	100 m	11.38
2018	European Championships	Berlin, Germany	4th	4 × 100 m relay	42.30
2019	European Indoor Championships	Glasgow, United Kingdom	8th	60 m	7.30
2019	Universiade	Naples, Italy	2nd	100 m	11.33
2019	Universiade	Naples, Italy	1st	4 × 100 m relay	43.72
2019	World Championships	Doha, Qatar	29th (h)	100 m	11.36
2019	World Championships	Doha, Qatar	4th	4 × 100 m relay	42.18
2021	European Indoor Championships	Toruń, Poland	1st	60 m	7.03
2021	Olympic Games	Tokyo, Japan	5th	100 m	10.97
2021	Olympic Games	Tokyo, Japan	4th	4 × 100 m relay	42.08
2022	World Championships	Eugene, United States	37th (h)	100 m	11.41
2022	World Championships	Eugene, United States	7th	4 × 100 m relay	42.81
2022	European Championships	Munich, Germany	9th (h)	4 × 100 m relay	43.93
2025	World Championships	Tokyo, Japan	–	4 × 100 m relay	DNF
2026	World Indoor Championships	Toruń, Poland	24th (h)	60 m	7.25
2026	European Championships	Birmingham, United Kingdom	3rd (h)	4 × 100 m relay	42.38

== Personal life ==
Her mother, Senada Položanin, was born in Jajce, SR Bosnia and Herzegovina, SFR Yugoslavia, where she worked as a doctor until the Bosnian War broke out. Her father, Claudio Del Ponte, is a cousin of war crimes prosecutor for the International Criminal Tribunal for the former Yugoslavia, Carla Del Ponte.
