= 2016 IAAF World U20 Championships – Women's 4 × 100 metres relay =

The women's 4 × 100 metres relay event at the 2016 IAAF World U20 Championships was held at Zdzisław Krzyszkowiak Stadium on 22 and 23 July.

== Medalists ==
Gold	Silver	Bronze
United States; Tia Jones; Taylor Bennett; Kaylor Harris; Candace Hill; Lynna Irby*	France; Tamara Murcia; Cynthia Leduc; Fanny Peltier; Estelle Raffai	Germany; Katrin Fehm; Keshia Kwadwo; Eleni Frommann; Chantal Butzek; Johanna Bechthold*

*Athletes who competed in heats only

== Records ==
World Junior Record	United States "Blue"	43.29	Eugene, United States	8 August 2006
Championship Record	Jamaica	43.40	Kingston, Jamaica	21 July 2002
World Junior Leading	Germany	44.25	Pliezhausen, Germany	8 May 2016

== Results ==
=== Heats ===
Qualification: First 2 of each heat (Q) plus the 2 fastest times (q) qualified for the final.

Rank	Heat	Nation	Athletes	Time	Notes
1	2	France	Tamara Murcia, Cynthia Leduc, Fanny Peltier, Estelle Raffai	43.82	Q, WU20L
2	2	United States	Lynna Irby, Tia Jones, Kaylor Harris, Candace Hill	44.31	Q, SB
3	2	Poland	Klaudia Adamek, Martyna Kotwiła, Olga Pietrzak, Ewa Swoboda	44.55	q, NU20R
4	3	Germany	Johanna Bechthold, Keshia Kwadwo, Eleni Frommann, Chantal Butzek	44.73	Q
5	3	Ireland	Molly Scott, Sharlene Mawdsley, Gina Akpe-Moses, Ciara Neville	45.09	Q, SB
6	1	Spain	Andrea Verdú, Ane Petrirena, Paula Sevilla, Lara Gómez	45.10	Q
7	3	Australia	Gabriella O'Grady, Maddison Coates, Samantha Geddes, Nicole Kay	45.18	q, SB
8	3	Italy	Zaynab Dosso, Sofia Bonicalza, Alessia Niotta, Desola Oki	45.50	
9	2	Canada	Shyvonne Roxborough, Natassha McDonald, Chinque Thompson, Keira Christie-Galloway	45.89	SB
10	2	Thailand	On-Uma Chattha, Parichat Charoensuk, Sureewan Runan, Suwimon Khongthong	45.89	
11	3	South Africa	Gezelle Magerman, Cassidy Williamson, Jeanelle Griesel, Taylon Bieldt	45.98	SB
12	1	Ecuador	Marina Poroso, Romina Cifuentes, Katherin Chillambo, Maribel Caicedo	46.20	Q, SB
	1	Czech Republic	Veronika Palicková, Zdenka Seidlová, Kateřina Vávrová, Nikola Bendová	DNF	
	1	Netherlands	Marijke Boogerd, Tasa Jiya, Bowien Jansen, Lieke Klaver	DNF	
	2	Great Britain	Hannah Brier, Charlotte McLennaghan, Finette Agyapong, Megan Marrs	DNF	
	1	Jamaica	Kimone Shaw, Patrice Moody, Shellece Clark, Vanesha Pusey	DQ	R163.3(a)
	3	New Zealand	Brooke Somerfield, Lucy Sheat, Zoe Hobbs, Olivia Eaton	DQ	R163.3(a)
	1	Trinidad and Tobago		DNS	

=== Final ===
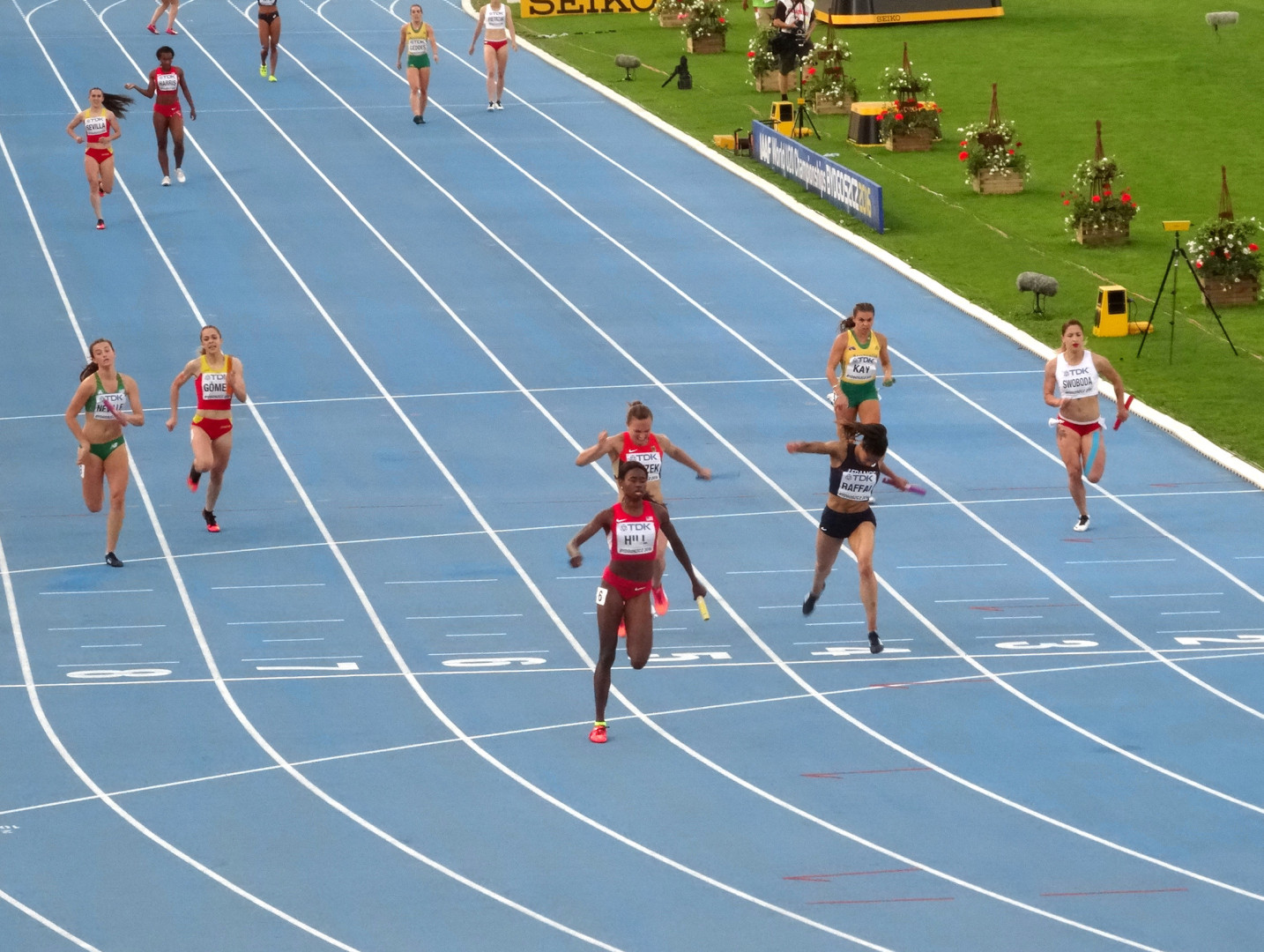
The finish

Rank	Lane	Nation	Athletes	Time	Notes
1st place, gold medalist(s)	6	United States	Tia Jones, Taylor Bennett, Kaylor Harris, Candace Hill	43.69	WU20L
2nd place, silver medalist(s)	4	France	Tamara Murcia, Cynthia Leduc, Fanny Peltier, Estelle Raffai	44.05	
3rd place, bronze medalist(s)	5	Germany	Katrin Fehm, Keshia Beverly Kwadwo, Eleni Frommann, Chantal Butzek	44.18	SB
4	2	Poland	Klaudia Adamek, Martyna Kotwiła, Olga Pietrzak, Ewa Swoboda	44.81	
5	8	Ireland	Molly Scott, Sharlene Mawdsley, Gina Akpe-Moses, Ciara Neville	44.82	NU20R
6	7	Spain	Andrea Verdú, Ane Petrirena, Paula Sevilla, Lara Gómez	44.99	NU20R
7	3	Australia	Nana-Adoma Owusu-Afriyie, Maddison Coates, Samantha Geddes, Nicole Kay	45.15	SB
8	9	Ecuador	Marina Poroso, Romina Cifuentes, Katherin Chillambo, Maribel Caicedo	45.72	SB
