= Alina Kenzel =

German shot putter

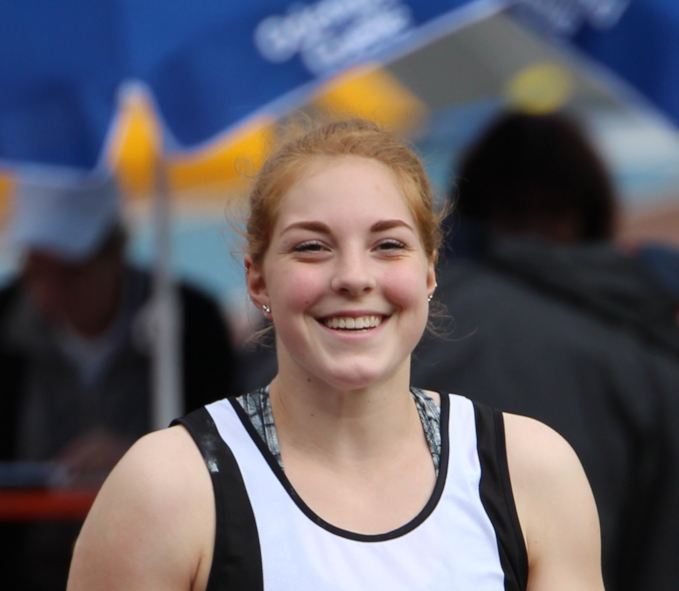
- Alina Kenzel in 2015

Personal information
- Born: 10 August 1997 (age 28) Konstanz, Baden-Württemberg, Germany
- Height: 1.82 m (6 ft 0 in)
- Weight: 90 kg (198 lb)

Sport
- Sport: Athletics
- Event: Shot put
- Club: VfL Waiblingen
- Coached by: Peter Salzer

Alina Kenzel (born 10 August 1997) is a German athlete specialising in the shot put. She won a gold medal at the 2016 World U20 Championships and a bronze at the 2017 European U23 Championships.

Her personal bests in the event are 18.21 metres outdoors (Rechberghausen 2018) and 17.68 metres indoors (Rochlitz 2017).

== International competitions ==
Representing Germany
Year	Competition	Venue	Position	Event	Notes
2013	World Youth Championships	Donetsk, Ukraine	7th	Shot put (3 kg)	16.74 m
2014	World Junior Championships	Eugene, United States	13th (q)	Shot put	14.86 m
2015	European Junior Championships	Eskilstuna, Sweden	6th	Shot put	15.70 m
2016	World U20 Championships	Bydgoszcz, Poland	1st	Shot put	17.58 m
2017	European IndoorChampionships	Belgrade, Serbia	14th (q)	Shot put	16.97 m
2017	European U23 Championships	Bydgoszcz, Poland	3rd	Shot put	17.46 m
2018	European Championships	Berlin, Germany	9th	Shot put	17.26 m
2019	European Indoor Championships	Glasgow, United Kingdom	8th	Shot put	17.55 m
2019	European U23 Championships	Gävle, Sweden	1st	Shot put	17.94 m
2019	World Championships	Doha, Qatar	20th (q)	Shot put	17.46 m
2024	World Indoor Championships	Glasgow, United Kingdom	11th	Shot put	17.80 m
2024	European Championships	Rome, Italy	4th	Shot put	18.55 m
2024	Olympic Games	Paris, France	9th	Shot put	18.29 m
2025	European Indoor Championships	Apeldoorn, Netherlands	6th	Shot put	18.89 m
