= Jennifer Montag =

German sprinter

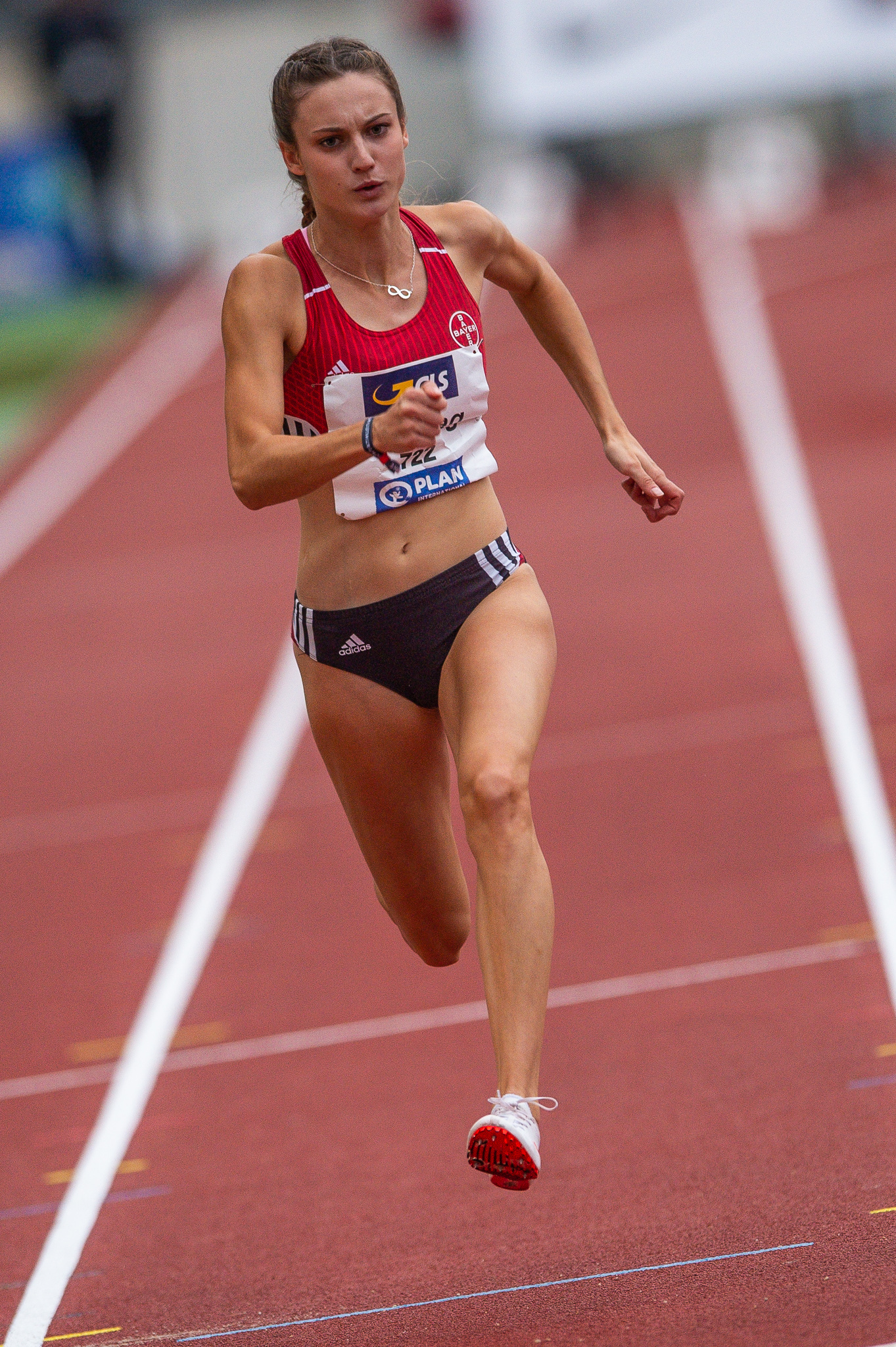
- Montag in 2018

Personal information
- Born: 11 February 1998 (age 27) Hackenbroich, Germany
- Height: 1.64 m (5 ft 5 in)

Sport
- Sport: Athletics
- Event: 100 metres
- Club: TSV Bayer 04 Leverkusen
- Coached by: Hans-Jörg Thomaskamp

Jennifer Montag (born 11 February 1998) is a German sprinter. She represented her country at the 2021 European Indoor Championships finishing seventh in the final. In 2017 she was part of the team that set the world U20 record in the 4 × 100 metres relay.

== International competitions ==
Year	Competition	Venue	Position	Event	Notes
Representing Germany
2017	European U20 Championships	Grosseto, Italy	13th (sf)	100 m	11.89
2017	European U20 Championships	Grosseto, Italy	1st	4 × 100 m relay	43.44
2018	World Cup	London, United Kingdom	4th	4 × 100 m relay	43.04
2019	World Relays	Yokohama, Japan	5th	4 × 200 m relay	1:34.92
2019	European U23 Championships	Gävle, Sweden	14th (sf)	100 m	11.91
2019	European U23 Championships	Gävle, Sweden	3rd	4 × 100 m relay	44.08
2021	European Indoor Championships	Toruń, Poland	7th	60 m	7.29
2024	European Championships	Rome, Italy	8th (h)	100 m	11.31^{1}

^{1}Did not start in the semifinals

== Personal bests ==
Outdoor

- 100 metres – 11.23 (+1.4 m/s, Wetzlar 2020)
- 200 metres – 23.50 (+1.5 m/s, Rehlingen 2018)
- Long jump – 6.42 (+0.9 m/s, Rhede 2020)

Indoor

- 60 metres – 7.19 (Dortmund 2021)
- 200 metres – 24.79 (Leverkusen 2018)
- Long jump – 6.21 (Leverkusen 2019)
