= Ewa Swoboda =

Polish sprinter (born 1997)

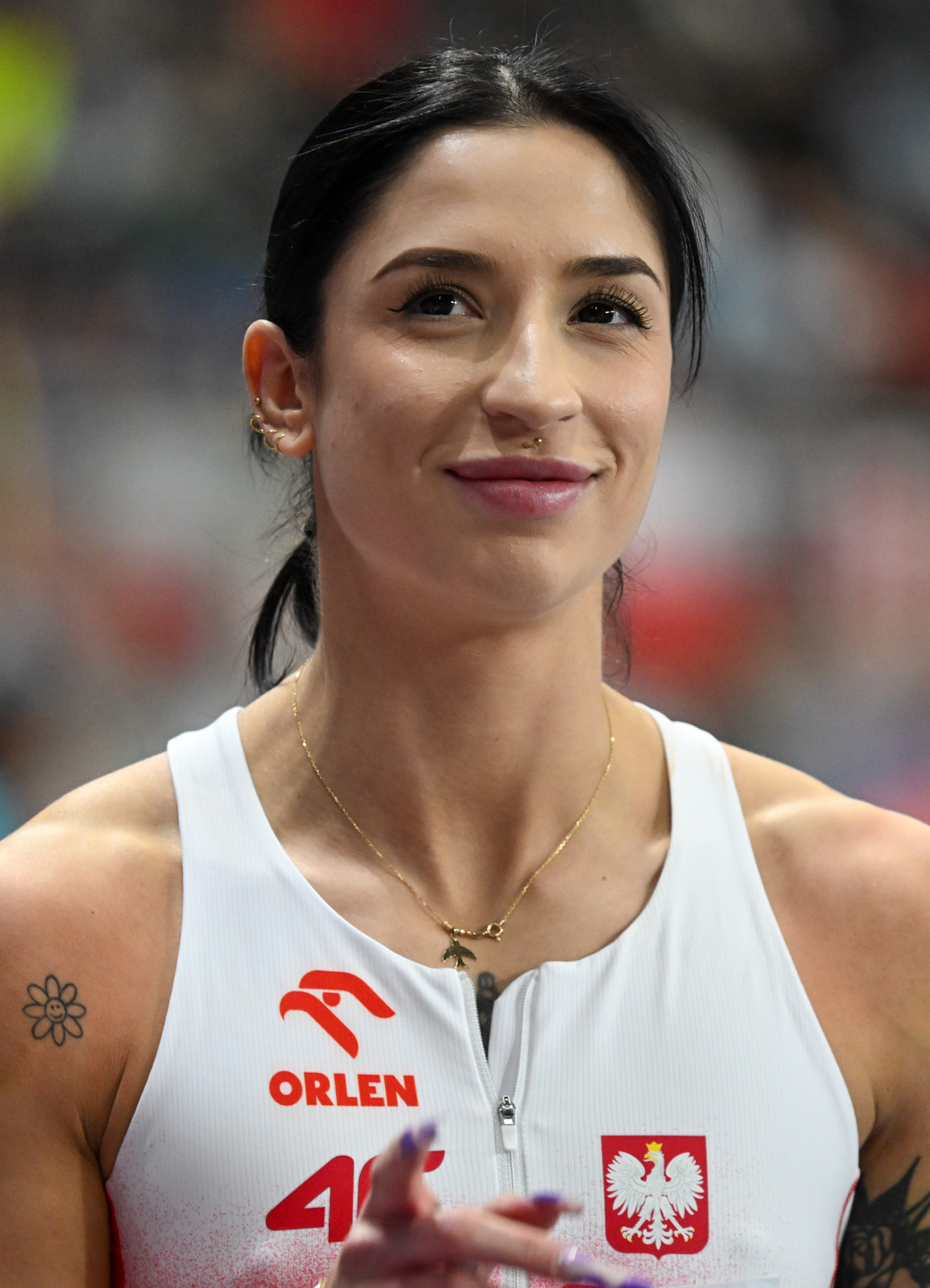
- Swoboda in 2026

Personal information
- Full name: Ewa Nikola Swoboda
- Born: July 26, 1997 (age 29) Żory, Poland
- Height: 1.64 m (5 ft 5 in)
- Weight: 60 kg (132 lb)

Sport
- Country: Poland
- Sport: Track and field
- Event: Sprint
- Club: AZS AWF Katowice, formerly UKS Czwórka Żory
- Coached by: Iwona Krupa

Achievements and titles
- Personal bests: 100 m: 10.94 (2023); 60 m: 6.98i NR (2024)
Medal record
Women's athletics
Representing Poland
World Indoor Championships
Silver medal – second place	2024 Glasgow	60 m
European Championships
Silver medal – second place	2022 Munich	4 × 100 m relay
Silver medal – second place	2024 Rome	100 m
Silver medal – second place	2026 Birmingham	100 m
Bronze medal – third place	2026 Birmingham	4 × 100 m relay
European Indoor Championships
Gold medal – first place	2019 Glasgow	60 m
Silver medal – second place	2017 Belgrade	60 m
Silver medal – second place	2023 Istanbul	60 m
European Games
Gold medal – first place	2023 Kraków–Małopolska	100 m
Silver medal – second place	2023 Kraków–Małopolska	4 × 100 m relay
European U23 Championships
Gold medal – first place	2017 Bydgoszcz	100 m
Gold medal – first place	2019 Gävle	100 m
Bronze medal – third place	2019 Gävle	4 × 100 m relay
World Junior Championships
Silver medal – second place	2016 Bydgoszcz	100 m
European Junior Championships
Gold medal – first place	2015 Eskilstuna	100 m
Silver medal – second place	2015 Eskilstuna	4 × 100 m relay

Ewa Nikola Swoboda (Polish pronunciation: [ˈɛva ɲiˈkɔla sfɔˈbɔda]; born 26 July 1997) is a Polish track and field sprinter who specialises in the short sprints. She is a World Indoor Championships silver medallist, three-time European Championships silver medallist, European Indoor Championships gold and two-time silver medallist, and European Games gold and silver medallist. Swoboda is a two-time Olympian and competed for Poland at the 2016 and 2024 Summer Olympics.

Swoboda is also a two-time European U23 champion, World Junior Championships silver medallist and European junior champion. At age 17, she was a finalist in the 60 metres in her senior debut at the 2015 European Indoor Championships and won the gold medal in the 100 metres at the 2015 European Junior Championships, before taking the silver medal at the 2016 World Junior Championships in the same event. She won the 100 metres event at the European U23 Championships in 2017 and 2019. Swoboda holds the world junior record of 7.07 seconds and the Polish record of 6.98 seconds in the 60 metres. She is a multiple medallist of national outdoor and indoor championships.

== Life and career ==
=== Career beginnings ===
Swoboda started competing in athletics from a young age and after joining the UKS Czwórka Żory athletics club, she began training under her coach Iwona Krupa. She won the Polish youth titles in the 100 metres in 2011 and 2012. The following year she won the national indoor junior 200 metres race.

Her international debut came at the 2013 World Youth Championships in Athletics where she placed fourth in the girls' 100 m with a run of 11.61 seconds; finishing as the best European in the race. Following the event, she ran a personal best and set a new Polish junior record of 11.54 seconds in the 100 m at the Polish Youth Olympic Days, where she completed a sprint double.

At the start of 2014, Swoboda claimed the Polish indoor junior title in the 60 metres. Outdoors, at the 2014 World Junior Championships in Athletics she was fifth in the 100 m, and failed to finish in the 200 m. At the European Youth Olympic Trials in Baku, she won the 100 m and was runner-up in the 200 m. Swoboda was one of the favourites for the 2014 Youth Olympics in the girls' 100 m, where she ran a new best of 11.30 seconds in her opening race – making her the second fastest junior athlete that year. However, she was disqualified in the 100 m final for a false start in the midst of crowd noise.

=== Senior career ===
Swoboda won her first senior national title at the 2015 Polish Indoor Championships and she also set a 60 metres European junior record of 7.21 seconds during the competition, which was also a world best for a seventeen-year-old. This gained her selection for the 2015 European Athletics Indoor Championships – her first senior appearance for Poland. Still aged seventeen, she made the final of the 60 m and ran another personal best of 7.20 seconds, improving her European junior record by 0.01 seconds. This was the joint fastest time achieved by a Polish woman in the competition's history – matching that of Irena Szewińska and Daria Korczyńska (both of whom were medallists). Swoboda competed in the 100 metres event at the 2016 Summer Olympics, where she reached the semifinals.

In March 2018 it was announced that Swoboda would be upgraded to silver medalist at the 2017 European Indoor Championship, after Ukraine's Olesya Povh's was disqualified for the use of unauthorized substances.

She was unable to participate at the 2021 European Athletics Indoor Championships in Toruń after testing positive to COVID-19 shortly before the start of the championships. Swoboda also did not compete at the 2020 Tokyo Olympics due to injury.

On 11 February 2022, she broke the Polish national record in the 60 meters twice at the Orlen Cup meeting in Łódź and set a new one by achieving 7.00 seconds. On 5 March, she broke the record again at the Polish Indoor Championships in Toruń with a time of 6.99 seconds, which was the tenth best result in the history of the competition.

She placed fourth at the 2022 World Indoor Championships held in Belgrade in a time of 7.04 seconds. The same time was measured for the fifth and sixth woman while Swoboda lost the bronze medal by 0.002 s.

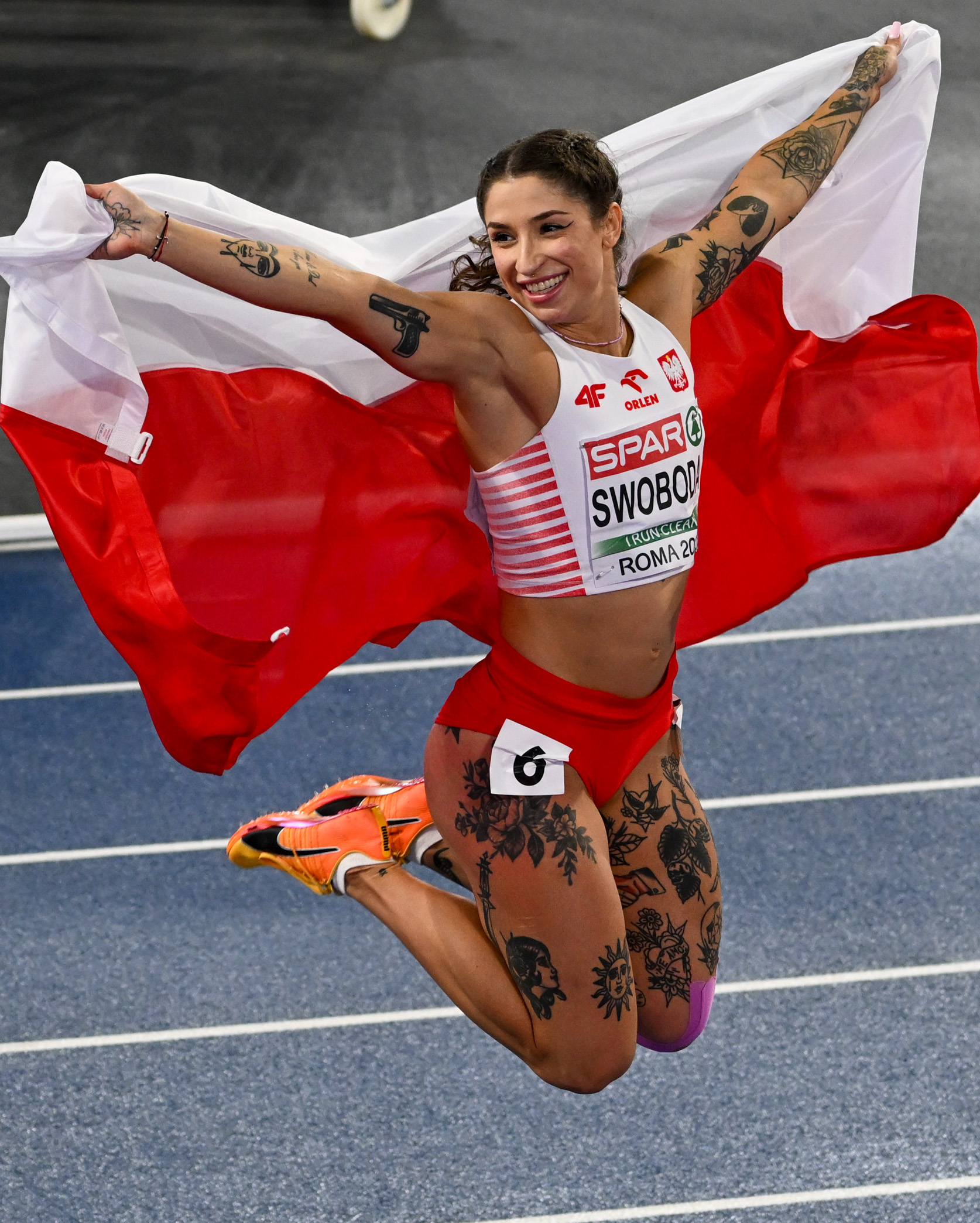
Swoboda at the 2024 European Athletics Championships in Rome

At the Diamond League meeting at the Silesian Stadium in Chorzów on 16 July 2023, she ran her first sub-11 second 100 m, as she placed third in a personal best of 10.94 seconds, just 0.01 adrift of Ewa Kasprzyk's Polish national record set in 1986.

At the 2023 World Athletics Championships she claimed sixth place in the Women's 100 metres achieving 10.97 seconds, the fastest result by a European woman.

In March 2024, Swoboda participated in the women's 60 meters at the World Athletics Indoor Championships in Glasgow. In the semifinals, she improved her personal best record and set a new national record by achieving 6.98 seconds. In the final, she won the silver medal by finishing in a time of 7.00 seconds, thus claiming her first medal at the World Indoor Championships event.

In June 2024, Swoboda won a silver medal in the women's 100 meters event at the European Championships in Rome by achieving 11.03 seconds losing only to Dina Asher-Smith of Great Britain. At the 2024 Summer Olympics, she reached the semifinals in the 100 meters event, but failed to make the final after falling short of 0.01 seconds to qualify.

In August 2026, Swoboda participated in the women's 100 meters event at the European Championships in Birmingham winning her second consecutive silver medal at the event, and her third silver medal overall at the European Championships. She recorded 11.02 seconds behind Britain's Amy Hunt (11.00).

== Personal life ==
She was in a relationship with Polish shot putter Konrad Bukowiecki. As of 2023, she was in a relationship with Polish athlete Krzysztof Kiljan. In one of her interviews, she admitted that in the past she was the target of hate speech and at one point started thinking about quitting the sport. She is a tattoo enthusiast. Her tattoos include a rose, cat and an inscription "Mom and dad, I love you" written in English.

== Achievements ==
=== Personal bests ===
- 100 metres – 10.94 (+0.2 m/s Diamond League - Chorzów 2023)
  - 100 metres U20 – 11.12 (+0.9 m/s Bydgoszcz 2016) NU20R
  - 100 metres U18 – 11.30 (0.0 m/s Nanjing 2014) NU18R
- 200 metres – 23.79 (+0.3 m/s) (Linz 2018)

Indoor

- 60 metres – 6.98 (Glasgow 2024) NR
  - 60 metres U20 – 7.07 (Toruń 2016) WU20R
- 200 metres – 24.55 (Spała 2014)

=== International competitions ===
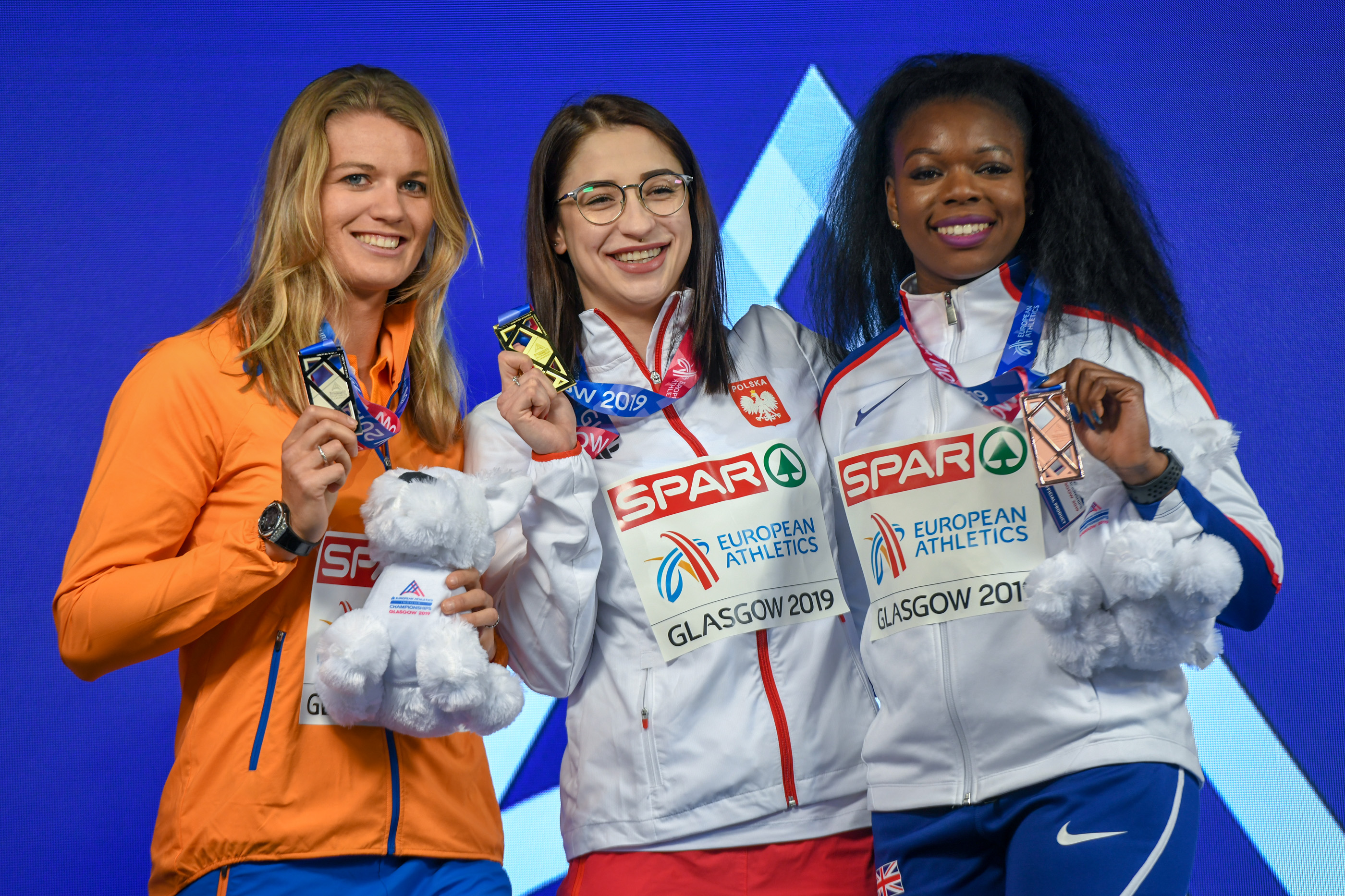
Swoboda won the gold medal in the 60 m at the 2019 European Indoor Championships in Glasgow; Dafne Schippers (L), Asha Philip (R)

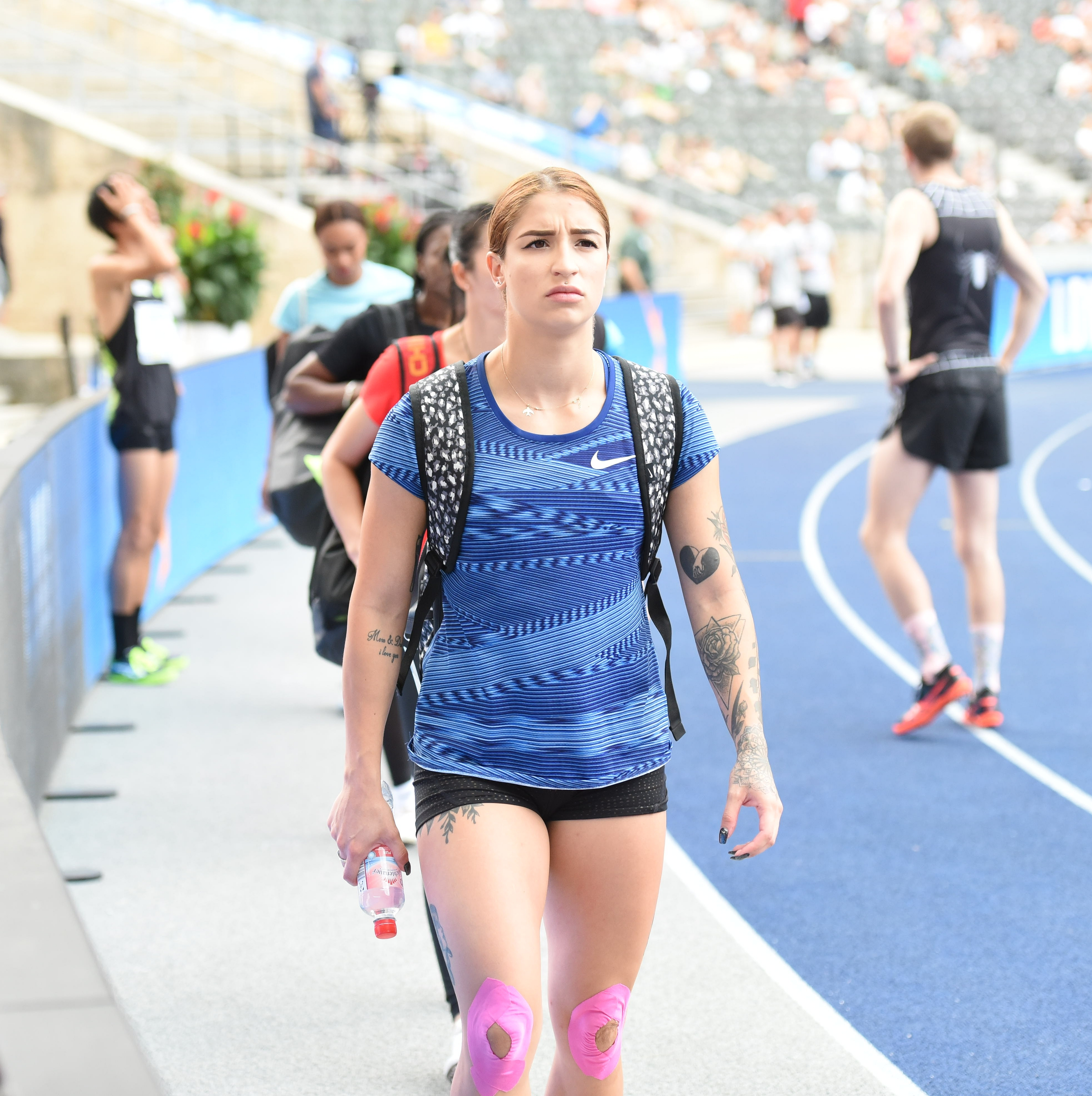
Ewa Swodoba at the ISTAF Berlin in 2019

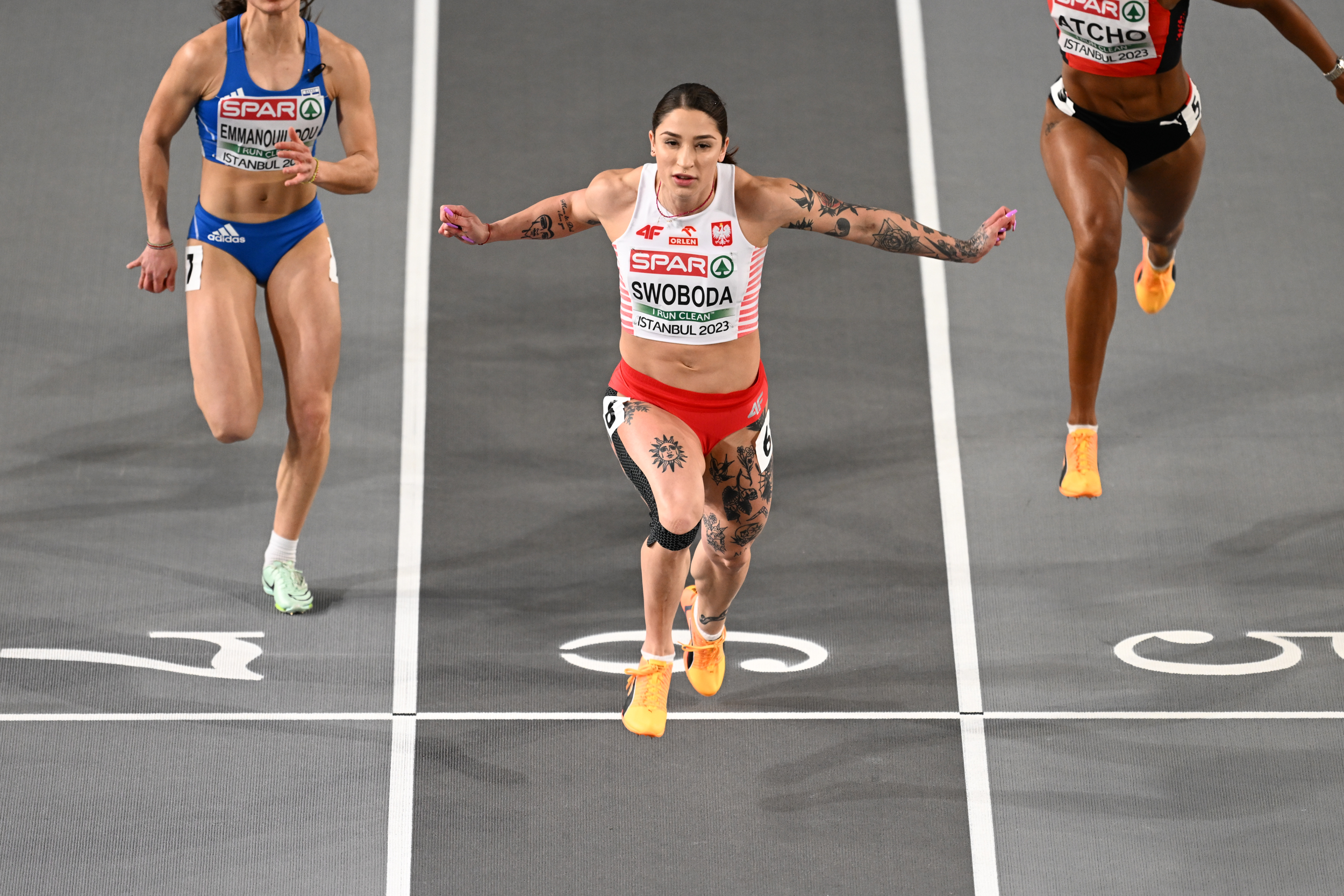
Swoboda at the European Athletics Indoor Championships in 2023

Representing Poland
Year	Competition	Venue	Position	Event	Result	Notes
2013	World Youth Championships	Donetsk, Ukraine	4th	100 m	11.61	
2014	World Junior Championships	Eugene, OR, United States	5th	100 m	11.59	(-1.0 m/s)
2014	World Junior Championships	Eugene, OR, United States	—	200 m	DNF	
2014	World Junior Championships	Eugene, OR, United States	—	4 × 100 m relay	DNF	
2014	Youth Olympics	Nanjing, China	—	100 m	DQ	False start (h NU18R)
2015	European Indoor Championships	Prague, Czech Republic	8th	60 m	7.20	AU20R
2015	European Team Championships, Super League	Cheboksary, Russia	3rd	100 m	11.48	
2015	European Team Championships, Super League	Cheboksary, Russia	4th	4 × 100 m relay	43.28	
2015	European Junior Championships	Eskilstuna, Sweden	1st	100 m	11.52	
2015	European Junior Championships	Eskilstuna, Sweden	2nd	4 × 100 m relay	45.28	
2016	European Championships	Amsterdam, Netherlands	7th	4 × 100 m relay	43.24	
2016	World Junior Championships	Bydgoszcz, Poland	2nd	100 m	11.12	NU20R
2016	World Junior Championships	Bydgoszcz, Poland	4th	4 × 100 m relay	44.81	
2016	Olympic Games	Rio de Janeiro, Brazil	15th (sf)	100 m	11.18	
2016	Olympic Games	Rio de Janeiro, Brazil	13th (h)	4 × 100 m relay	43.33	
2017	European Indoor Championships	Belgrade, Serbia	2nd	60 m	7.10	SB
2017	European Team Championships, Super League	Lille, France	—	100 m	DQ	
2017	European Team Championships, Super League	Lille, France	2nd	4 × 100 m relay	43.07	
2017	European U23 Championships	Bydgoszcz, Poland	1st	100 m	11.42	
2017	European U23 Championships	Bydgoszcz, Poland	4th	4 × 100 m relay	44.21	
2017	World Championships	London, United Kingdom	24th (sf)	100 m	11.35	
2018	World Indoor Championships	Birmingham, United Kingdom	16th (sf)	60 m	7.25	
2018	European Championships	Berlin, Germany	11th (sf)	100 m	11.30	
2018	European Championships	Berlin, Germany	6th	4 × 100 m relay	43.34	
2019	European Indoor Championships	Glasgow, Scotland	1st	60 m	7.09	
2019	World Relays	Yokohama, Japan	—	4 × 100 m relay	DNF	
2019	European U23 Championships	Gävle, Sweden	1st	100 m	11.15	SB
2019	European U23 Championships	Gävle, Sweden	3rd	4 × 100 m relay	44.08	SB
2019	European Team Championships, Super League	Bydgoszcz, Poland	3rd	100 m	11.35	
2019	European Team Championships, Super League	Bydgoszcz, Poland	6th	4 × 100 m relay	44.23	
2019	World Championships	Doha, Qatar	16th (sf)	100 m	11.27	
2022	World Indoor Championships	Belgrade, Serbia	4th	60 m	7.04	
2022	World Championships	Eugene, OR, United States	12th (sf)	100 m	11.08	
2022	World Championships	Eugene, OR, United States	11th (h)	4 × 100 m relay	43.19	
2022	European Championships	Munich, Germany	4th	100 m	11.18	
2022	European Championships	Munich, Germany	2nd	4 × 100 m relay	42.61	NR
2023	European Indoor Championships	Istanbul, Turkey	2nd	60 m	7.09	=SB
2023	World Championships	Budapest, Hungary	6th	100 m	10.97	
2023	World Championships	Budapest, Hungary	5th	4 × 100 m relay	42.66	
2024	World Indoor Championships	Glasgow, United Kingdom	2nd	60 m	7.00	
2024	European Championships	Rome, Italy	2nd	100 m	11.03	
2024	European Championships	Rome, Italy	8th (h)	4 × 100 m relay	43.15^{1}	
2024	Olympic Games	Paris, France	9th (sf)	100 m	11.08	
2024	Olympic Games	Paris, France	12th (h)	4 × 100 m relay	42.86	
2025	European Indoor Championships	Apeldoorn, Netherlands	4th	60 m	7.07	
2025	World Indoor Championships	Nanjing, China	4th	60 m	7.09	
2025	World Championships	Tokyo, Japan	24th (sf)	100 m	11.36	
2025	World Championships	Tokyo, Japan	8th	4 × 100 m relay	42.83^{2}	
2026	World Indoor Championships	Toruń, Poland	6th	60 m	7.07	
2026	European Championships	Birmingham, United Kingdom	2nd	100 m	11.02	
2026	European Championships	Birmingham, United Kingdom	3rd	4 × 100 m relay	43.15	

^{1}Did not finish in the final
^{2}Disqualified in the final

=== National titles ===
- Polish Athletics Championships
  - 100 metres (8): 2016, 2017, 2018, 2019, 2020, 2022, 2023, 2024
  - 4 × 100 m relay (1): 2020
- Polish Indoor Athletics Championships
  - 60 metres (8): 2015, 2017, 2018, 2019, 2021, 2022, 2023, 2024

=== Honours and accolades ===
- Medal of the 100th Anniversary of Regaining Independence (2019)
- Barbie Role Model doll created by Mattel (2024)
