= Sina Mayer =

German sprinter (born 1995)

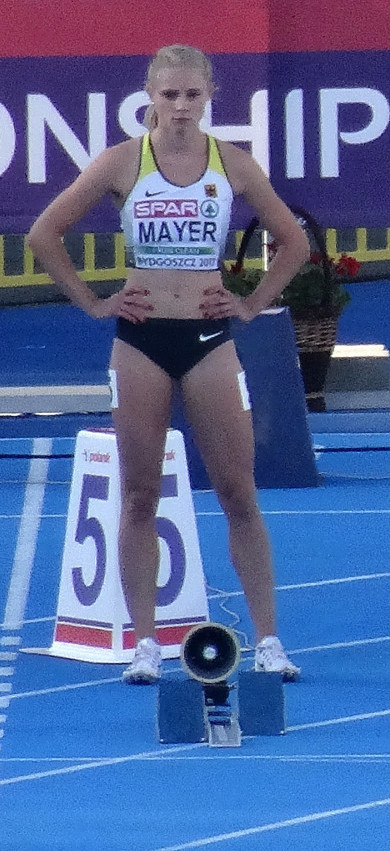
- Mayer in 2017

Personal information
- Born: 10 April 1995 (age 31)
- Height: 1.70 m (5 ft 7 in)

Sport
- Sport: Athletics
- Event: Sprint

Achievements and titles
- Personal best(s): 60 m: 7.30 (2021); 100 m: 11.18 (2025); 200 m 23.36 (2025)
Medal record
Women's athletics
Representing Germany
World Championships
| Bronze medal – third place | 2025 Tokyo | 4 × 100 m relay |
European U20 Championships
| Bronze medal – third place | 2017 Bydgoszcz | 100 m |

Sina Mayer (born 10 April 1995) is a German sprinter. She was a bronze medalist representing her country in the women's 4 × 100 metres relay at the 2025 World Athletics Championships.

== Biography ==
From Rhineland-Palatinate, Mayer has competed as a member of LAZ Zweibrücken. She won a bronze medal in Bydgoszcz, Poland at the 2017 European Athletics U23 Championships in the 100 metres race in 11.58 seconds to finish behind gold medalist Ewa Swoboda, having previously ran 11.50 seconds in the semi-final.

Mayer was a member of the German 4 × 100 metres relay team which placed sixth in the final at the 2023 World Athletics Championships in Budapest, Hungary.

Mayer competed at the 2025 World Athletics Relays in Guangzhou, China in the Mixed 4 × 100 metres relay in May 2025. She was part of the German 4 × 100 metres relay team which finished third at the 2025 European Athletics Team Championships First Division in Madrid, Spain in June 2025. She placed third in the 100 metres at the German Athletics Championships in August 2025 in Dresden, running 11.37 seconds to finish behind Sophia Junk and Gina Lückenkemper.

In September 2025, Mayer competed in the 100 metres at the 2025 World Championships in Tokyo, Japan. She also ran in the women's 4 × 100 metres relay at the championships, winning the bronze medal with the German team.

Mayer placed fourth behind new German champion Philina Schwartz at the German Indoor Championships over 60 metres on 28 February 2026.
