= 2017 European Athletics U23 Championships =

- Dates: 13–16 July
- Host city: Bydgoszcz, Poland
- Venue: Zdzisław Krzyszkowiak Stadium
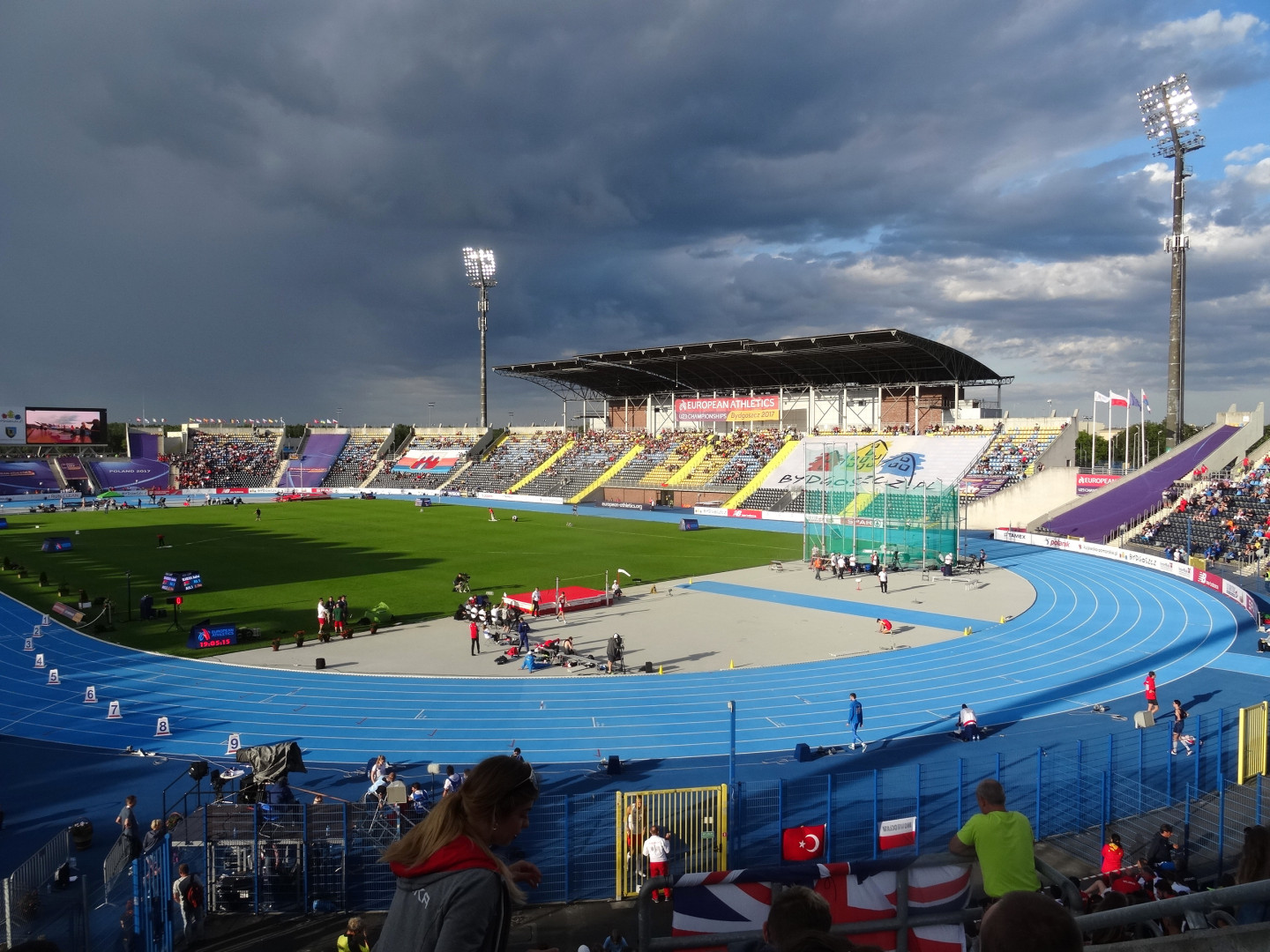
- Level: Under 23
- Type: Outdoor
- Events: 44
- Participation: 1013 athletes from 47 nations

The 2017 European Athletics U23 Championships were the 11th edition of the biennial athletics competition between European athletes under the age of twenty-three. It was held in Bydgoszcz, Poland from 13 to 16 July. This was the second time that the competition was hosted by Bydgoszcz after the 2003 edition.

== Medal summary ==
=== Men ===
==== Track ====
Event	Gold		Silver		Bronze	
100 metres (wind: 0.0 m/s)	Ojie Edoburun; Great Britain	10.14	Ján Volko; Slovakia	10.18	Jonathan Quarcoo; Norway	10.29
200 metres (wind: +1.6 m/s)	Ján Volko; Slovakia	20.33; CR, NR	Gautier Dautremer; France	20.66; PB	Roger Gurski; Germany	20.70
400 metres	Luka Janežič; Slovenia	45.33	Karsten Warholm; Norway	45.75	Benjamin Lobo Vedel; Denmark	46.08
800 metres	Andreas Kramer; Sweden	1:48.15	Daniel Rowden; Great Britain	1:48.16	Marc Reuther; Germany	1:48.66
1500 metres	Marius Probst; Germany	3:49.06	Filip Sasínek; Czech Republic	3:49.23	Michał Rozmys; Poland	3:49.30
5000 metres	Yemaneberhan Crippa; Italy	14:14.28	Simon Debognies; Belgium	14:14.71	Carlos Mayo; Spain	14:15.07
10,000 metres	Carlos Mayo; Spain	29:28.06	Amanal Petros; Germany	29:34.94	Emmanuel Roudolff-Lévisse; France	29:42.85
110 metres hurdles	Ludovic Payen; France	13.49; PB	Khai Riley-Laborde; Great Britain	13.65	Dylan Caty; France	13.66; PB
400 metres hurdles	Karsten Warholm; Norway	48.37; CR	Dany Brand; Switzerland	49.14; NU23R	Ludvy Vaillant; France	49.31; PB
3000 metres steeplechase	Yohanes Chiappinelli; Italy	8:34.33	Ahmed Abdelwahed; Italy	8:37.02	Jamaine Coleman; Great Britain	8:40.44
4 × 100 metres relay	Germany; Roger Gurski; Kai Köllmann; Philipp Trutenat; Daniel Hoffmann; Deniz Almas*	39.11	Great Britain; Theo Etienne; Kyle de Escofet; Reuben Arthur; Ojie Edoburun	39.11	Finland; Willem Kajander; Oskari Lehtonen; Samuli Samuelsson; Aleksi Lehto	39.70
4 × 400 metres relay	Great Britain; Lee Thompson; Ben Snaith; Sam Hazel; Cameron Chalmers; Thomas Somers*	3:03.65	Poland; Wiktor Suwara; Przemysław Waściński; Kajetan Duszyński; Dariusz Kowaluk; Cezary Mirosław*; Łukasz Smolnicki *	3:04.22	France; Victor Coroller; Gilles Biron; Étienne Merville; Ludvy Vaillant; Adrien Coulibaly*; Hugo Houyez*	3:05.24
20 kilometres walk	Diego García; Spain	1:22:29	Karl Junghannß; Germany	1:22:52	Gabriel Bordier; France	1:23:03; PB

* Medalists who participated in heats only.

==== Field ====
Event	Gold		Silver		Bronze	
High jump	Dzmitry Nabokau; Belarus	2.24	Christian Falocchi; Italy	2.24; PB	Viktor Lonskyy; Ukraine	2.24
Pole vault	Ben Broeders; Belgium	5.60	Axel Chapelle; France	5.60	Adrián Vallés; Spain	5.50
Long jump	Vladyslav Mazur; Ukraine	8.04; EL, PB	Filippo Randazzo; Italy	7.98w	Thobias Nilsson Montler; Sweden	7.96
Triple jump	Nazim Babayev; Azerbaijan	17.18; PB	Simo Lipsanen; Finland	17.14; NR	Max Heß; Germany	16.68
Shot put	Konrad Bukowiecki; Poland	21.59; CR, EL	Denzel Comenentia; Netherlands	19.86	Sebastiano Bianchetti; Italy	19.69
Discus throw	Sven Martin Skagestad; Norway	61.00	Alin Firfirică; Romania	60.17	Clemens Prüfer; Germany	60.08
Hammer throw	Bence Halász; Hungary	73.30	Bence Pásztor; Hungary	71.51	Alexej Mikhailov; Germany	70.60
Javelin throw	Norbert Rivasz-Tóth; Hungary	83.08; NR	Ioannis Kiriazis; Greece	81.04	Andrian Mardare; Moldova	78.76

==== Combined ====
Event	Gold		Silver		Bronze	
Decathlon	Jiří Sýkora; Czech Republic	8084	Fredrik Samuelsson; Sweden	8010	Elmo Savola; Finland	7956; PB

=== Women ===
==== Track ====
Event	Gold		Silver		Bronze	
100 metres (wind: -0.6 m/s)	Ewa Swoboda; Poland	11.42	Krystsina Tsimanouskaya; Belarus	11.54	Sina Mayer; Germany	11.58
200 metres (wind: +1.3 m/s)	Finette Agyapong; Great Britain	22.87	Sarah Atcho; Switzerland	22.90; PB	Yana Kachur; Ukraine	23.20; PB
400 metres	Gunta Latiševa-Čudare; Latvia	52.00	Laura Müller; Germany	52.42	Laura de Witte; Netherlands	52.51
800 metres	Renée Eykens; Belgium	2:04.73	Aníta Hinriksdóttir; Iceland	2:05.02	Hannah Segrave; Great Britain	2:05.53
1500 metres	Konstanze Klosterhalfen; Germany	4:10.30	Sofia Ennaoui; Poland	4:13.54	Martyna Galant; Poland	4:17.91
5000 metres	Yasemin Can; Turkey	15:01.67; CR	Alina Reh; Germany	15:10.57; PB	Sarah Lahti; Sweden	15:14.17; SB
10,000 metres	Yasemin Can; Turkey	31:39.80; CR	Sarah Lahti; Sweden	32:46.91	Büşra Nur Koku; Turkey	33:33.22
100 metres hurdles	Nadine Visser; Netherlands	12.92	Elvira Herman; Belarus	12.95	Luca Kozák; Hungary	13.06
400 metres hurdles	Ayomide Folorunso; Italy	55.82; SB	Jessica Turner; Great Britain	56.08; PB	Arna Stefanía Gudmundsdóttir; Iceland	56.37; SB
3000 metres steeplechase	Anna Emilie Møller; Denmark	9:43.05	Nataliya Strebkova; Ukraine	9:44.52; NU23R	Emma Oudiou; France	9:50.30; SB
4 × 100 metres relay	Spain; Paula Sevilla; Ane Petrirena; Lara Gómez; Cristina Lara	43.96	France; Maroussia Paré; Cynthia Leduc; Fanny Peltier; Amandine Brossier	44.06	Switzerland; Riccarda Dietsche; Sarah Atcho; Ajla Del Ponte; Géraldine Frey	44.07
4 × 400 metres relay	Poland; Dominika Muraszewska; Adrianna Janowicz; Mariola Karaś; Aleksandra Gaworska	3:29.66	Germany; Hendrikje Richter; Laura Müller; Nelly Schmidt; Hannah Mergenthaler	3:30.18	Ukraine; Dariya Stavnycha; Yana Kachur; Tetyana Melnyk; Kateryna Klymyuk	3:30.22
20 kilometres walk	Klavdiya Afanasyeva; Individual Athletes	1:31:15	María Pérez; Spain	1:31:29	Živilė Vaiciukevičiūtė; Lithuania	1:32:21

==== Field ====
Event	Gold		Silver		Bronze	
High jump	Yuliya Levchenko; Ukraine	1.96	Iryna Herashchenko; Ukraine	1.92	Erika Furlani; Italy	1.86
Pole vault	Angelica Moser; Switzerland	4.55	Maryna Kylypko; Ukraine	4.45	Lucy Bryan; Great Britain	4.40 =PB
Long jump	Yanis David; France	6.56; PB	Anna Bühler; Germany	6.50	Maryna Bekh; Ukraine	6.48
Triple jump	Elena Panțuroiu; Romania	14.27	Ana Peleteiro; Spain	14.19	Rouguy Diallo; France	13.99w
Shot put	Fanny Roos; Sweden	18.14	Klaudia Kardasz; Poland	17.67	Alina Kenzel; Germany	17.46
Discus throw	Claudine Vita; Germany	61.79	Daria Zabawska; Poland	59.08	Veronika Domjan; Slovenia	58.48; SB
Hammer throw	Alyona Shamotina; Ukraine	67.46	Camille Sainte-Luce; France	66.98	Beatrice Nedberge Llano; Norway	66.74
Javelin throw	Sara Kolak; Croatia	65.12	Anete Kociņa; Latvia	64.47; PB	Marcelina Witek; Poland	63.03; PB

==== Combined ====
Event	Gold		Silver		Bronze	
Heptathlon	Caroline Agnou; Switzerland	6330; NR	Verena Preiner; Austria	6232; NU23R	Celina Leffler; Germany	6070; PB

== Medal table ==
* Host nation (Poland)

Rank	Nation	Gold	Silver	Bronze	Total
1	Germany (GER)	4	6	8	18
2	Great Britain (GBR)	3	4	3	10
2	Poland (POL)*	3	4	3	10
4	Ukraine (UKR)	3	3	4	10
5	Italy (ITA)	3	3	2	8
6	Spain (ESP)	3	2	2	7
7	France (FRA)	2	4	7	13
8	Sweden (SWE)	2	2	2	6
9	Switzerland (SUI)	2	2	1	5
10	Norway (NOR)	2	1	2	5
11	Hungary (HUN)	2	1	1	4
12	Belgium (BEL)	2	1	0	3
13	Turkey (TUR)	2	0	1	3
14	Belarus (BLR)	1	2	0	3
15	Netherlands (NED)	1	1	1	3
16	Czech Republic (CZE)	1	1	0	2
16	Latvia (LAT)	1	1	0	2
16	Romania (ROU)	1	1	0	2
16	Slovakia (SVK)	1	1	0	2
20	Denmark (DEN)	1	0	1	2
20	Slovenia (SLO)	1	0	1	2
22	Azerbaijan (AZE)	1	0	0	1
22	Croatia (CRO)	1	0	0	1
22	Individual Athletes (IEA)	1	0	0	1
25	Finland (FIN)	0	1	2	3
26	Iceland (ISL)	0	1	1	2
27	Austria (AUT)	0	1	0	1
27	Greece (GRE)	0	1	0	1
29	Lithuania (LTU)	0	0	1	1
29	Moldova (MDA)	0	0	1	1
Totals (30 entries)		44	44	44	132

== Participation ==
- Andorra (1)
- Armenia (1)
- Austria (15)
- Azerbaijan (2)
- Belarus (28)
- Belgium (17)
- Bosnia and Herzegovina (3)
- Bulgaria (7)
- Croatia (19)
- Cyprus (7)
- Czech Republic (29)
- Denmark (13)
- Estonia (13)
- Finland (41)
- France (58)
- Georgia (2)
- Germany (72)
- Gibraltar (2)
- Great Britain (45)
- Greece (15)
- Hungary (32)
- Independent Athletes (2)
- Iceland (9)
- Ireland (18)
- Israel (8)
- Italy (81)
- Kosovo (1)
- Latvia (10)
- Lithuania (22)
- Luxembourg (3)
- Macedonia (2)
- Malta (2)
- Moldova (5)
- Netherlands (19)
- Norway (27)
- Poland (58)
- Portugal (28)
- Romania (25)
- San Marino (2)
- Serbia (10)
- Slovakia (15)
- Slovenia (12)
- Spain (64)
- Sweden (43)
- Switzerland (32)
- Turkey (44)
- Ukraine (49)

== Records ==
- (Poland) Konrad Bukowiecki 21.26 CR -Shot Put Men- Qlf
- (Poland) Konrad Bukowiecki 21.44 CR -Shot Put Men- Final
- (Poland) Konrad Bukowiecki 21.59 CR -Shot Put Men- Final
- (Turkey) Yasemin Can 31:39.80 CR -10,000 metres- Final
- (Slovenia) Anita Horvat 51.94 NR -400 metres- Heats
- (Switzerland) Caroline Agnou 6330 NR -Heptathlon-
- (Hungary) Norbert Rivasz-Tóth 83.08 NR -Javelin throw- Final
- (Slovakia) Ján Volko 20.33 CR, NR -200 metres- Final
- (Finland) Simo Lipsanen 17.14 NR -Triple jump- Final
- (Norway) Karsten Warholm 48.37 CR -400 metres hurdles- Final
