= Estelle Raffai =

French sprinter

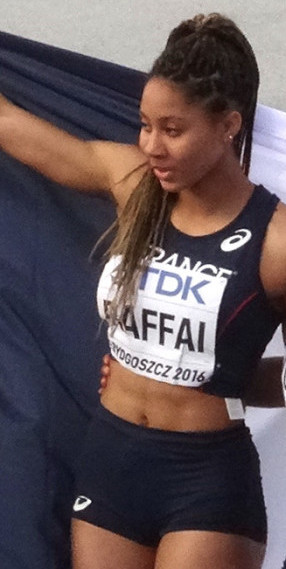
- Estelle Raffai in 2016

Personal information
- Born: 6 February 1998 (age 28) Longjumeau, France
- Height: 1.73 m (5 ft 8 in)
- Weight: 63 kg (139 lb)

Sport
- Sport: Athletics
- Event: 200 metres
- Club: Athle 91
- Coached by: Alex Ménal

Estelle Raffai (born 6 February 1998 in Longjumeau) is a French sprinter competing primarily in the 200 metres. She represented her country at the 2017 World Championships reaching the semifinals. In addition, she won two medals at the 2016 World U20 Championships.

== International competitions ==
Year	Competition	Venue	Position	Event	Notes
Representing France
2015	World Youth Championships	Cali, Colombia	7th	100 m	11.73
2015	World Youth Championships	Cali, Colombia	4th	200 m	23.67
2016	World U20 Championships	Bydgoszcz, Poland	3rd	200 m	23.48
2016	World U20 Championships	Bydgoszcz, Poland	2nd	4 × 100 m relay	44.05
2017	World Relays	Nassau, Bahamas	6th	4 × 200 m relay	1:35.11
2017	European U20 Championships	Grosseto, Italy	5th	200 m	23.58
2017	European U20 Championships	Grosseto, Italy	2nd	4 × 100 m relay	44.03
2017	World Championships	London, United Kingdom	22nd (sf)	200 m	23.45
2018	Mediterranean Games	Tarragona, Spain	7th	200 m	23.51
2018	Mediterranean Games	Tarragona, Spain	1st	4 × 100 m relay	43.29
2019	World Relays	Yokohama, Japan	1st	4 × 200 m relay	1:32.16
2019	European U23 Championships	Gävle, Sweden	2nd	200 m	23.35
2019	European U23 Championships	Gävle, Sweden	2nd	4 × 100 m relay	43.82
2019	World Championships	Doha, Qatar	–	4 × 100 m relay	DQ
2025	World Relays	Guangzhou, China	6th	4 × 400 m relay	3:26.87

== Personal bests ==
Outdoor

- 100 metres – 11.51 (+1.0 m/s, Châteauroux 2016)
- 200 metres – 23.05 (+1.9 m/s, Antony 2017)
- 400 metres – 53.71 (Nice 2017)

Indoor

- 60 metres – 7.40 (Eaubonne 2017)
- 200 metres – 23.57 (Eaubonne 2016)
