= Cynthia Leduc =

French sprinter (born 1997)

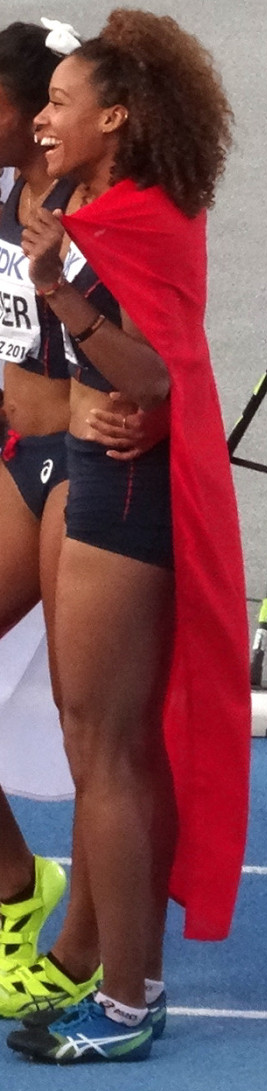
- Leduc in 2016

Personal information
- Born: 16 February 1997 (age 29) Créteil, France
- Height: 1.71 m (5 ft 7 in)
- Weight: 57 kg (126 lb)

Sport
- Country: France
- Sport: Athletics
- Events: 100 m, 200 m
- Club: SCO Marseille
- Coached by: François Pepin

Cynthia Leduc (born 16 February 1997 in Creteil) is a French sprinter. She won a gold medal in the 4 × 200 metres relay at the 2019 World Relays in Yokohama. Later that year, she won a silver medal in the 100 metres at the 2019 European U23 Championships in Gävle.

In 2014, she competed in the girls' 100 metres event at the 2014 Summer Youth Olympics held in Nanjing, China.

== International competitions ==
Year	Competition	Venue	Position	Event	Notes
Representing France
2014	Youth Olympic Games	Nanjing, China	5th (B)	100 m	12.15
2015	European Junior Championships	Eskilstuna, Sweden	3rd	4 × 100 m relay	45.35
2016	World U20 Championships	Bydgoszcz, Poland	16th (sf)	200 m	24.02
2016	World U20 Championships	Bydgoszcz, Poland	2nd	4 × 100 m relay	44.05
2017	European U23 Championships	Bydgoszcz, Poland	10th (sf)	100 m	11.62
2017	European U23 Championships	Bydgoszcz, Poland	2nd	4 × 100 m relay	44.06
2018	Mediterranean U23 Championships	Jesolo, Italy	1st	100 m	23.70
2018	Mediterranean U23 Championships	Jesolo, Italy	1st	4 × 100 m relay	44.39
2019	World Relays	Yokohama, Japan	–	4 × 100 m relay	DNF
2019	World Relays	Yokohama, Japan	1st	4 × 200 m relay	1:32.16
2019	European U23 Championships	Gävle, Sweden	2nd	100 m	11.40
2019	World Championships	Doha, Qatar	–	4 × 100 m relay	DQ
2021	World Relays	Chorzów, Poland	2nd (h)	4 × 100 m relay	43.51^{1}
2021	Olympic Games	Tokyo, Japan	7th	4 × 100 m relay	42.89

^{1}Did not finish in the final

== Personal bests ==
Outdoor

- 100 metres – 11.33 (+0.4 m/s, Chateauroux 2019)
- 200 metres – 23.35 (+1.6 m/s, Cergy-Pontoise 2018)
- 400 metres – 54.10 (Forbach 2018)

Indoor

- 60 metres – 7.29 (Nantes 2019)
- 200 metres – 24.09 (Nantes 1016)
