= Lisa Nippgen =

German sprinter

Personal information
- Born: 2 April 1997 (age 29)

Sport
- Country: Germany
- Sport: Track and field
- Event: 4 × 100 metres relay

Lisa Nippgen (born 2 April 1997) is a German sprinter. She competed in the women's 100 metres at the 2017 European Athletics U23 Championships. She qualified in the women's 4 × 100 metres relay event at the 2020 Summer Olympics held in Tokyo, Japan.

== Education ==
She attended Ludwigshafen University of Applied Sciences, and is currently a student of corporate law at the University of Mannheim.
