= Riccarda Dietsche =

Swiss sprinter

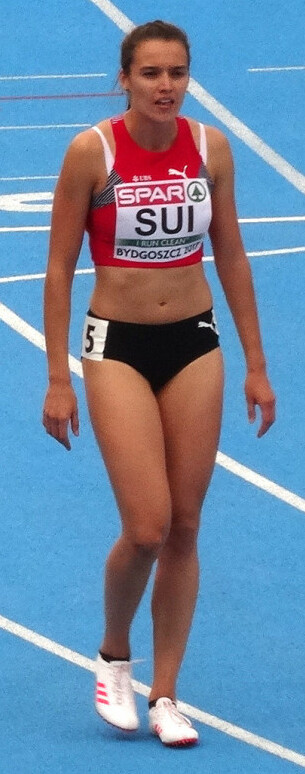

Personal information
- Nationality: Swiss
- Born: 30 April 1996 (age 29)

Sport
- Sport: Athletics
- Event: 100 metres

Riccarda Dietsche (born 30 April 1996) is a Swiss athlete. She competed in the women's 4 × 100 metres relay event at the 2020 Summer Olympics.
