= Maroussia Paré =

French sprinter (born 1996)

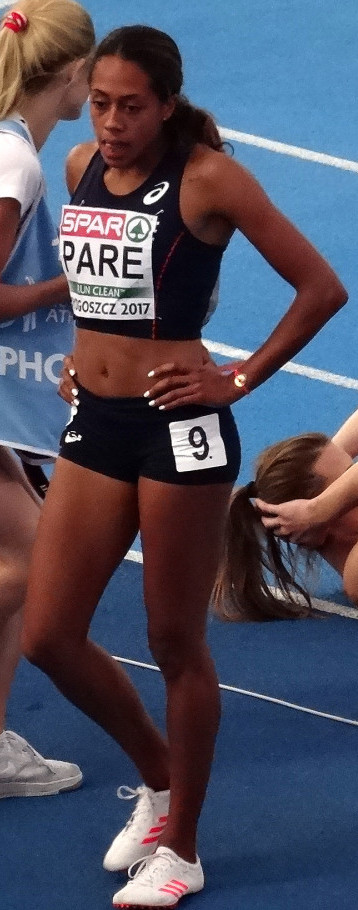
- Paré in 2017

Personal information
- Born: 18 July 1996 (age 30) Bordeaux, France
- Height: 1.63 m (5 ft 4 in)
- Weight: 52 kg (115 lb)

Sport
- Country: France
- Sport: Track and field
- Events: 100 metres 4 × 100 metres relay
- Club: Us Talence
- Coached by: Alain Lastecoueres (2012–)
Medal record
Women's athletics
Representing France
European Championships
Silver medal – second place	2024 Rome	4 × 100 m relay

Maroussia Paré (born 18 July 1996) is a French sprinter. She competed in the 4 × 100 metres relay event at the 2015 World Championships in Athletics in Beijing, China.
