= 2019 European Athletics U23 Championships =

- Dates: 11–14 July
- Host city: Gävle, Sweden
- Venue: Gunder Hägg-stadion
- Level: Under 23
- Type: Outdoor
- Events: 44
- Participation: 1039 athletes from 50 nations

The 2019 European Athletics U23 Championships were the 12th edition of the biennial athletics competition between European athletes under the age of twenty-three. It was held in Gävle, Sweden from 11 to 14 July.

== Medal summary ==
=== Men ===
==== Track ====
Event	Gold		Silver		Bronze	
100 metres	Henrik Larsson; Sweden	10.23	Oliver Bromby; Great Britain	10.24	Joris van Gool; Netherlands	10.27
200 metres	Shemar Boldizsar; Great Britain	20.89	Kobe Vleminckx; Belgium	21.04	Ryan Zézé; France	21.05
400 metres	Fabrisio Saïdy; France	45.79 EU23L	Cameron Chalmers; Great Britain	45.92 SB	Brayan Lopez; Italy	46.16 PB
800 metres	Mateusz Borkowski; Poland	1:48.75	Spencer Thomas; Great Britain	1:49.06	Pablo Sánchez-Valladares; Spain	1:49.36
1500 metres	Ignacio Fontes; Spain	3:50.38	Piers Copeland; Great Britain	3:50.89	Elzan Bibić; Serbia	3:50.90
5000 metres	Jimmy Gressier; France	14:16.55	Hugo Hay; France	14:17.00	Abdessamad Oukhelfen; Spain	14:17.23
10,000 metres	Jimmy Gressier; France	28:44.17	Tadesse Getahon; Israel	28:46.97	Emile Cairess; Great Britain	28:50.21
110 metres hurdles	Jason Joseph; Switzerland	13.45	Michał Sierocki; Poland	13.63 PB	Cameron Fillery; Great Britain	13.64
400 metres hurdles	Wilfried Happio; France	49.03 U23L PB	Nick Smidt; Netherlands	49.49 PB	Emil Agyekum; Germany	49.69 PB
3000 metres steeplechase	Frederik Ruppert; Germany	8:44.49	Alexis Phelut; France	8:45.04	Simon Sundström; Sweden	8:45.82
4 × 100 metres relay	Kevin Kranz; Marvin Schulte; Deniz Almas; Philipp Trutenat; Germany	39.22	Amaury Golitin; Ryan Zézé; Yanis Ammour; Max Sirguey; France	39.57	Simon Verherstraeten; Kobe Vleminckx; Antoine Snyders; Raphaël Kapenda; Camille Snyders*; Belgium	39.77
4 × 400 metres relay	Maximilian Grupen; Marvin Schlegel; Fabian Dammermann; Manuel Sanders; Jean Paul Bredau*; Germany	3:03.92	Alex Haydock-Wilson; Lee Thompson; Joe Brier; Cameron Chalmers; Ellis Greatrex*; Great Britain	3:04.59	Loïc Prévot; Téo Andant; Lidji Mbaye; Fabrisio Saïdy; Diego Milla*; Lorenzo Ricque*; France	3:05.36
20 kilometres walk	Vasiliy Mizinov; Authorised Neutral Athletes	1:21:29 EU23L	Salih Korkmaz; Turkey	1:21:32 NR	Callum Wilkinson; Great Britain	1:22:13

* Medalists who participated in heats only.

==== Field ====
Event	Gold		Silver		Bronze	
High jump	Maksim Nedasekau; Belarus	2.29 m	Tom Gale; Great Britain	2.27 m SB	Norbert Kobielski; Poland	2.23 m
Pole vault	Bo Kanda Lita Baehre; Germany	5.65 m	Emmanouil Karalis; Greece	5.60 m	Thibaut Collet; France	5.60 m
Long jump	Miltiadis Tentoglou; Greece	8.32 m EL	Héctor Santos; Spain	8.19 m PB	Gabriele Chilà; Italy	8.00 m PB
Triple jump	Necati Er; Turkey	17.37 m WU23L NR	Nazim Babayev; Azerbaijan	17.03 m	Andrea Dallavalle; Italy	16.95 PB
Shot put	Konrad Bukowiecki; Poland	21.51 m	Leonardo Fabbri; Italy	20.50 m	Wictor Petersson; Sweden	19.53 m
Discus throw	Kristjan Čeh; Slovenia	63.82 m WU23L PB	Clemens Prüfer; Germany	62.15 m	Oskar Stachnik; Poland	60.01 m
Hammer throw	Alberto González; Spain	74.36 m PB	Bence Halász; Hungary	74.14 m	Mykhaylo Havrylyuk; Ukraine	72.23 m
Javelin throw	Cyprian Mrzygłód; Poland	84.97 m CR NU23R PB	Alexandru Novac; Romania	81.75 m	Aliaksei Katkavets; Belarus	80.31 m

==== Combined ====
Event	Gold		Silver		Bronze	
Decathlon	Niklas Kaul; Germany	8572 pts CR	Johannes Erm; Estonia	8445 pts NU23R	Manuel Eitel; Germany	8067 pts

=== Women ===
==== Track ====
Event	Gold		Silver		Bronze	
100 metres	Ewa Swoboda; Poland	11.15 SB	Cynthia Leduc; France	11.40	Lisa Nippgen; Germany	11.45
200 metres	Sindija Bukša; Latvia	23.24 SB	Estelle Raffai; France	23.35 SB	Sarah Richard; France	23.50
400 metres	Natalia Kaczmarek; Poland	52.34 PB	Lada Vondrová; Czech Republic	52.40	Andrea Miklos; Romania	52.66 SB
800 metres	Jemma Reekie; Great Britain	2:05.19	Ellie Baker; Great Britain	2:06.33	Nadia Power; Ireland	2:06.68
1500 metres	Jemma Reekie; Great Britain	4:22.81	Elise Vanderelst; Belgium	4:23.50	Marta Zenoni; Italy	4:23.96
5000 metres	Anna Emilie Møller; Denmark	15:07.70 NR	Alina Reh; Germany	15:11.25	Célia Antón; Spain	15:28.66 NU23R
10,000 metres	Alina Reh; Germany	31:39.34 CR	Miriam Dattke; Germany	32:29.45 PB	Jasmijn Lau; Netherlands	33:35.66
100 metres hurdles	Elvira Herman; Belarus	12.70 CR	Klaudia Siciarz; Poland	12.82 PB	Laura Valette; France	12.97
400 metres hurdles	Paulien Couckuyt; Belgium	56.17 PB	Linda Olivieri; Italy	56.22	Yasmin Giger; Switzerland	56.37 SB
3000 metres steeplechase	Anna Emilie Møller; Denmark	9:27.31 CR	Eilish Flanagan; Ireland	9:51.72 PB	Claudia Prisecaru; Romania	9:53.21 PB
4 × 100 metres relay	Jennifer Montag; Keshia Kwadwo; Sophia Junk; Lisa Nippgen; Germany	43.45	Leisly Regulier; Eloise de la Taille; Estelle Raffai; Sarah Richard; France	43.82	Klaudia Siciarz; Marlena Gola; Martyna Kotwiła; Ewa Swoboda; Jagoda Mierzyńska*; Poland	44.08
4 × 400 metres relay	Karolina Łozowska; Natalia Wosztyl; Natalia Widawska; Natalia Kaczmarek; Poland	3:32.56	Lily Beckford; Finette Agyapong; Yasmin Liverpool; Hannah Williams; Great Britain	3:32.91	Nelly Schmidt; Corinna Schwab; Alica Schmidt; Luna Bulmahn; Germany	3:33.83
20 kilometres walk	Ayşe Tekdal; Turkey	1:34:47	Olga Niedziałek; Poland	1:35:54	Yana Smerdova; Authorised Neutral Athletes	1:35:58 SB

==== Field ====
Event	Gold		Silver		Bronze	
High jump	Yuliya Levchenko; Ukraine	1.97 m	Christina Honsel; Germany	1.92 m PB	Ella Junnila; Finland	1.92 m
Pole vault	Angelica Moser; Switzerland	4.56 m EU23L	Amálie Švábícová; Czech Republic	4.35 m	Yelizaveta Bondarenko; Authorised Neutral Athletes	4.35 m
Long jump	Hilary Kpatcha; France	6.73 m	Petra Farkas; Hungary	6.55 m PB	Milica Gardašević; Serbia	6.43 m
Triple jump	Diana Zagainova; Lithuania	13.89 m	Tuğba Danışmaz; Turkey	13.85 m NU23R PB	Viyaleta Skvartsova; Belarus	13.79 m SB
Shot put	Alina Kenzel; Germany	17.94 m	Katharina Maisch; Germany	17.64 m	Julia Ritter; Germany	17.17 m
Discus throw	Marija Tolj; Croatia	62.76 m EU23L PB	Alexandra Emilianov; Moldova	57.30 m	Annina Brandenburg; Germany	56.52 m
Hammer throw	Sofiya Palkina; Authorised Neutral Athletes	71.08 m	Nastassia Maslava; Belarus	69.36 m SB	Sara Fantini; Italy	68.35 m
Javelin throw	Annika Fuchs; Germany	63.38 m PB	Eda Tuğsuz; Turkey	61.03 m	Evelina Mendes; France	55.57 m

==== Combined ====
Event	Gold		Silver		Bronze	
Heptathlon	Géraldine Ruckstuhl; Switzerland	6274 pts SB	Sophie Weißenberg; Germany	6175 pts	Hanne Maudens; Belgium	6093 pts SB

== Medal table ==
* Host nation (Sweden)

Rank	Nation	Gold	Silver	Bronze	Total
1	Germany (GER)	9	6	6	21
2	Poland (POL)	6	3	3	12
3	France (FRA)	5	6	6	17
4	Great Britain (GBR)	3	8	3	14
5	Switzerland (SUI)	3	0	1	4
6	Turkey (TUR)	2	3	0	5
7	Spain (ESP)	2	1	3	6
8	Belarus (BLR)	2	1	2	5
–	Authorised Neutral Athletes (ANA)	2	0	2	4
9	Denmark (DEN)	2	0	0	2
10	Belgium (BEL)	1	2	2	5
11	Greece (GRE)	1	1	0	2
12	Sweden (SWE)*	1	0	2	3
13	Ukraine (UKR)	1	0	1	2
14	Croatia (CRO)	1	0	0	1
14	Latvia (LAT)	1	0	0	1
14	Lithuania (LTU)	1	0	0	1
14	Slovenia (SLO)	1	0	0	1
18	Italy (ITA)	0	2	5	7
19	Czech Republic (CZE)	0	2	0	2
19	Hungary (HUN)	0	2	0	2
21	Netherlands (NED)	0	1	2	3
21	Romania (ROU)	0	1	2	3
23	Ireland (IRL)	0	1	1	2
24	Azerbaijan (AZE)	0	1	0	1
24	Estonia (EST)	0	1	0	1
24	Israel (ISR)	0	1	0	1
24	Moldova (MDA)	0	1	0	1
28	Serbia (SRB)	0	0	2	2
29	Finland (FIN)	0	0	1	1
Totals (29 entries)		44	44	44	132

== Participation ==
1039 athletes from 50 nations competed at this edition.

- Albania (1)
- Andorra (1)
- Armenia (1)
- Austria (14)
- Authorised Neutral Athletes (13)
- Azerbaijan (1)
- Belarus (28)
- Belgium (23)
- Bosnia and Herzegovina (5)
- Bulgaria (8)
- Croatia (10)
- Cyprus (5)
- Czech Republic (33)
- Denmark (12)
- Estonia (10)
- Finland (43)
- France (75)
- Georgia (3)
- Germany (55)
- Great Britain (54)
- Greece (27)
- Hungary (30)
- Iceland (3)
- Ireland (38)
- Israel (9)
- Italy (67)
- Kosovo (1)
- Latvia (16)
- Liechtenstein (1)
- Lithuania (13)
- Luxembourg (2)
- Malta (3)
- Moldova (4)
- Monaco (1)
- Montenegro (1)
- Netherlands (22)
- North Macedonia (1)
- Norway (25)
- Poland (51)
- Portugal (31)
- Romania (27)
- San Marino (1)
- Serbia (11)
- Slovakia (10)
- Slovenia (9)
- Spain (45)
- Sweden (50)
- Switzerland (33)
- Turkey (58)
- Ukraine (54)
