= 2021 World Athletics Relays – Men's 4 × 200 metres relay =

Men's 4 × 200 metres relay at the 2021 World Athletics Relays
- Venue: Silesian Stadium
- Dates: 2 May 2021
- Nations: 6

Medalists
gold medal	Steven Müller; Felix Straub; Lucas Ansah-Peprah; Owen Ansah	Germany
silver medal	Mark Odhiambo; Mike Nyang'au; Elijah Mathew; Hesborn Ochieng	Kenya
bronze medal	Frederico Curvelo; Delvis Santos; Diogo Antunes; André Prazeres	Portugal

The Men's 4 × 200 metres relay at the 2021 IAAF World Relays was held at Silesian Stadium on 2 May.

== Records ==
Prior to the competition, the records were as follows:

World record	Jamaica (Nickel Ashmeade; Warren Weir; Jermaine Brown; Yohan Blake)	1:18.63	(The Bahamas) Nassau, Bahamas	24 May 2014
Championship record	Jamaica (Nickel Ashmeade; Warren Weir; Jermaine Brown; Yohan Blake)	1:18.63	(The Bahamas) Nassau, Bahamas	24 May 2014
World lead	Star Athletics (Javon Francis; Justin Gatlin; Isiah Young; Emmanuel Matadi)	1:21.31	Prairie View, Texas, United States	27 March 2021

== Results ==
KEY:	WL	World leading	CR	Championship record	NR	National record	SB	Seasonal best

=== Final ===
Rank	Lane	Nation	Athletes	Time	Notes
1st place, gold medalist(s)	7	Germany	Steven Müller, Felix Straub, Lucas Ansah-Peprah, Owen Ansah	1:22.43	SB
2nd place, silver medalist(s)	5	Kenya	Mark Odhiambo, Mike Nyang'au, Elijah Mathew, Hesborn Ochieng	1:24.26	SB
3rd place, bronze medalist(s)	3	Portugal	Frederico Curvelo, Delvis Santos, Diogo Antunes, André Prazeres	1:24.53	NR
4	2	Ecuador	Alex Quiñónez, Anderson Marquínez, Steeven Salas, Katriel Angulo	1:24.89	NR
	6	Denmark	Steffen Udengaard Knudsen, Simon Hansen, Tazana Kamanga-Dyrbak, Kojo Musah	DNF	
	4	Poland	Dominik Kopeć, Adrian Brzeziński, Łukasz Żok, Karol Zalewski	DQ	TR24.6.3
