= 2019 European Athletics U23 Championships – Men's 200 metres =

The men's 200 metres event at the 2019 European Athletics U23 Championships was held in Gävle, Sweden, at Gavlehov Stadium Park on 12 and 13 July.

== Medalists ==
Gold	Silver	Bronze
Shemar Boldizsar; Great Britain	Kobe Vleminckx; Belgium	Ryan Zézé; France

== Results ==
=== Heats ===
12 July
Qualification: First 4 in each heat (Q) and next 4 fastest (q) qualified for the semifinals.

Wind:
Heat 1: +0.4 m/s, Heat 2: +1.1 m/s, Heat 3: +1.1 m/s, Heat 4: +1.2 m/s, Heat 5: +0.8 m/s

Rank	Heat	Name	Nationality	Time	Notes
1	1	Toby Harries	Great Britain	20.86	Q
2	5	Ryan Zézé	France	20.88	Q, PB
3	2	Loïc Prévot	France	20.93	Q
4	5	Pol Retamal	Spain	20.95	Q
5	5	Shemar Boldizsar	Great Britain	20.96	Q
6	2	Kobe Vleminckx	Belgium	20.96	Q
7	2	Mathias Hove Johansen	Norway	21.01	Q, SB
8	4	Andrey Kukharenko	Authorised Neutral Athletes	21.15	Q
9	3	Felix Straub	Germany	21.17	Q
10	1	Kasper Kadestål	Sweden	21.18	Q
11	5	Oskari Lehtonen	Finland	21.18	Q
12	1	Frieder Scheuschner	Germany	21.18	Q
13	1	Svetlin Ivanov	Bulgaria	21.20	Q
14	3	Adrian Brzeziński	Poland	21.22	Q, =PB
15	4	Adam Balcerek	Poland	21.23	Q, PB
16	3	William Reais	Switzerland	21.23	Q
17	4	Max Sirguey	France	21.23	Q
18	2	Michele Rancan	Italy	21.26	Q
19	3	Henrik Larsson	Sweden	21.28	Q
20	2	Mark Smyth	Ireland	21.29	q, PB
21	4	Frederico Curvelo	Portugal	21.34	Q
22	3	Diego Pettorossi	Italy	21.37	q
23	2	Gediminas Truskauskas	Lithuania	21.39	q
24	5	Anders Pihlblad	Sweden	21.43	q
25	5	Simon Hansen	Denmark	21.47	SB
26	3	Erik Kostrytsya	Ukraine	21.54	
27	4	Antonio Ivanov	Bulgaria	21.59	
28	5	Stanislau Darahakupets	Belarus	21.60	
29	1	Jure Grkman	Slovenia	21.60	
30	5	Jovan Stojoski	North Macedonia	21.64	
31	4	Dániel Szabó	Hungary	21.73	
32	1	Marian Valentin Tanase	Romania	21.80	
32	1	Stanislav Kovalenko	Ukraine	21.85	
33	4	Maksym Kuzin	Ukraine	21.98	
34	3	Philipp Frommelt	Liechtenstein	23.15	PB
	2	Delvis Santos	Portugal	DQ	R163.3

=== Semifinals ===
13 July
Qualification: First 2 in each heat (Q) and next 2 fastest (q) qualified for the final.

Wind:
Heat 1: -1.2 m/s, Heat 2: -1.2 m/s, Heat 3: +1.3 m/s

Rank	Heat	Name	Nationality	Time	Notes
1	1	Shemar Boldizsar	Great Britain	20.93	Q
2	2	Toby Harries	Great Britain	20.97	Q
3	2	Kobe Vleminckx	Belgium	21.03	Q
4	3	Ryan Zézé	France	21.03	Q
5	2	Pol Retamal	Spain	21.20	q
6	3	Kasper Kadestål	Sweden	21.24	Q
7	2	Mathias Hove Johansen	Norway	21.29	q
8	1	Loïc Prévot	France	21.33	Q
9	1	Frieder Scheuschner	Germany	21.34	
10	1	Andrey Kukharenko	Authorised Neutral Athletes	21.37	
11	3	Felix Straub	Germany	21.38	
12	1	Adrian Brzeziński	Poland	21.38	
13	2	Max Sirguey	France	21.46	
14	1	William Reais	Switzerland	21.47	
15	2	Gediminas Truskauskas	Lithuania	21.47	
16	1	Oskari Lehtonen	Finland	21.55	
17	3	Svetlin Ivanov	Bulgaria	21.55	
18	3	Frederico Curvelo	Portugal	21.65	
19	1	Anders Pihlblad	Sweden	21.69	
20	1	Mark Smyth	Ireland	21.71	
21	2	Michele Rancan	Italy	21.74	
22	3	Diego Pettorossi	Italy	21.97	
	2	Adam Balcerek	Poland	DNS	
	3	Henrik Larsson	Sweden	DNS	

=== Final ===
13 July

Wind: -0.1 m/s

Rank	Lane	Name	Nationality	Time	Notes
1st place, gold medalist(s)	6	Shemar Boldizsar	Great Britain	20.89	
2nd place, silver medalist(s)	3	Kobe Vleminckx	Belgium	21.04	
3rd place, bronze medalist(s)	5	Ryan Zézé	France	21.05	
4	4	Toby Harries	Great Britain	21.17	
5	2	Pol Retamal	Spain	21.19	
6	7	Loïc Prévot	France	21.21	
7	8	Kasper Kadestål	Sweden	21.24	
8	1	Mathias Hove Johansen	Norway	21.38	
