= 2024 Ibero-American Championships in Athletics – Results =

These are the official results of the 2024 Ibero-American Championships in Athletics which took place on 10, 11 and 12 May 2024 at the Centro de Treinamento Olímpico in Cuiabá, Brazil.

== Men's results ==
=== 100 metres ===
Heats – 10 May
Wind:
Heat 1: +0.8 m/s, Heat 2: +0.7 m/s, Heat 3: +0.9 m/s

Rank	Heat	Name	Nationality	Time	Notes
1	3	José González	Dominican Republic	10.10	Q
2	1	Felipe Bardi	Brazil	10.11	Q
3	3	Neiker Abello	Colombia	10.15	Q PB
4	2	Arturo Deliser	Panama	10.18	Q
5	2	Erik Cardoso	Brazil	10.18	Q
6	1	Diego González	Puerto Rico	10.27	Q
7	3	André Prazeres	Portugal	10.33	q
8	1	Franco Florio	Argentina	10.35	q
9	2	Franquelo Pérez	Dominican Republic	10.35	
10	1	Jhonny Rentería	Colombia	10.38	
11	3	Misael Zalazar	Paraguay	10.41	
12	3	Frederico Curvelo	Portugal	10.41	
13	2	Katriel Angulo	Ecuador	10.47	
14	2	Daniel Londero	Argentina	10.51	
14	3	Marcos dos Santos	Angola	10.51	
16	1	Aron Earl	Peru	10.53	
17	3	Jonathan Wolk	Paraguay	10.56	
18	1	Enrique Polanco	Chile	10.60	
19	3	Ismael Arevalo	Peru	10.74	
20	1	Tito Hinojosa	Bolivia	11.42	

Final – 10 May

Wind: -0.8 m/s

Rank	Lane	Name	Nationality	Time	Notes
1st place, gold medalist(s)	3	Felipe Bardi	Brazil	10.14	
2nd place, silver medalist(s)	5	José González	Dominican Republic	10.25	
3rd place, bronze medalist(s)	6	Neiker Abello	Colombia	10.26	
4	7	Erik Cardoso	Brazil	10.29	
5	2	Diego González	Puerto Rico	10.34	
6	4	Arturo Deliser	Panama	10.36	
7	1	Franco Florio	Argentina	10.39	
8	8	André Prazeres	Portugal	10.46	

=== 200 metres ===
Heats – 11 May
Wind:
Heat 1: +0.7 m/s, Heat 2: +1.0 m/s, Heat 3: +0.9 m/s

Rank	Heat	Name	Nationality	Time	Notes
1	1	Erik Cardoso	Brazil	20.56	Q
2	3	José González	Dominican Republic	20.58	Q
3	3	César Almirón	Paraguay	20.71	Q
4	2	José Figueroa	Puerto Rico	20.72	Q
5	1	Anderson Marquínez	Ecuador	20.85	Q
6	2	Juan Ignacio Ciampitti	Argentina	20.88	Q
7	2	Delvis Santos	Portugal	20.90	q
8	1	Jeison Phipps	Dominican Republic	20.97	q
9	1	Benjamín Aravena	Chile	20.97	NU20R
10	2	Jorge Vides	Brazil	20.97	
11	1	Rafael Jorge	Portugal	21.04	
12	2	Óscar Baltán	Colombia	21.10	
12	3	Carlos Palacios	Colombia	21.10	SB
14	3	Tomás Mondino	Argentina	21.13	
15	1	Jhumiler Sánchez	Paraguay	21.18	
16	3	Katriel Angulo	Ecuador	21.25	
17	3	Alejandro Díaz	Mexico	21.72	
18	2	César Ramírez	Mexico	23.23	

Final – 12 May

Wind: -0.1 m/s

Rank	Lane	Name	Nationality	Time	Notes
1st place, gold medalist(s)	5	José González	Dominican Republic	20.27	
2nd place, silver medalist(s)	8	Juan Ignacio Ciampitti	Argentina	20.48	
3rd place, bronze medalist(s)	7	Erik Cardoso	Brazil	20.50	
4	3	César Almirón	Paraguay	20.54	
5	6	José Figueroa	Puerto Rico	20.54	
6	2	Delvis Santos	Portugal	20.78	
7	4	Anderson Marquinez	Ecuador	20.95	
8	1	Jeison Phipps	Dominican Republic	21.00	

=== 400 metres ===
Heats – 11 May

Rank	Heat	Name	Nationality	Time	Notes
1	1	Omar Elkhatib	Portugal	46.20	Q
2	3	Lucas Vilar	Brazil	46.41	Q
3	1	Javier Gómez	Venezuela	46.48	Q
4	2	Anthony Zambrano	Colombia	46.51	Q
5	1	Anderson Marquínez	Ecuador	46.59	q
6	1	Edgar Isaac	Mexico	46.69	q
7	2	Elián Larregina	Argentina	46.84	Q
8	2	Valente Mendoza	Mexico	46.93	q
9	3	Markel Fernández	Spain	47.04	Q
10	3	Ricardo dos Santos	Portugal	47.07	
11	1	Wilbert Encarnación	Dominican Republic	47.30	
12	3	Ismael Adon	Dominican Republic	47.87	
13	3	Nicolás Salinas	Colombia	48.27	
14	2	Francisco Tejeda	Ecuador	48.28	
15	2	Paul Wood	Paraguay	49.13	
16	2	Jeffrey Cajo	Peru	50.01	
17	3	Rodrigo Cornejo	Peru	51.89	
	1	Lucas Carvalho	Brazil	DNF	

Final – 11 May

Rank	Lane	Name	Nationality	Time	Notes
1st place, gold medalist(s)	3	Elián Larregina	Argentina	45.27	NR
2nd place, silver medalist(s)	6	Omar Elkhatib	Portugal	45.46	
3rd place, bronze medalist(s)	5	Anthony Zambrano	Colombia	46.05	SB
4	4	Valente Mendoza	Mexico	46.13	
5	7	Javier Gómez	Venezuela	46.24	
6	2	Edgar Isaac	Mexico	46.39	
7	1	Anderson Marquínez	Ecuador	46.83	
8	8	Markel Fernández	Spain	47.77	
	–	Lucas Vilar	Brazil	DNS	

=== 800 metres ===
Heats – 10 May

Rank	Heat	Name	Nationality	Time	Notes
1	1	José Antonio Maita	Venezuela	1:49.53	Q
2	1	Rafael Muñoz	Chile	1:49.54	Q
3	1	Pablo Sánchez-Valladares	Spain	1:49.59	Q
4	1	Marco Vilca	Peru	1:49.67	q
5	2	Jânio Varjão	Brazil	1:49.86	Q
6	1	Eduardo Moreira	Brazil	1:50.51	q
7	2	Chamar Chambers	Panama	1:50.87	Q
8	2	Javier Mirón	Spain	1:51.37	Q
9	2	Ryan López	Venezuela	1:51.72	
10	2	Luis Eduardo Viafara	Colombia	1:54.25	
11	1	Rodis Arrua	Paraguay	2:02.67	

Final – 11 May

Rank	Name	Nationality	Time	Notes
1st place, gold medalist(s)	Chamar Chambers	Panama	1:45.27	NR
2nd place, silver medalist(s)	José Antonio Maita	Venezuela	1:45.55	
3rd place, bronze medalist(s)	Rafael Muñoz	Chile	1:46.37	
4	Marco Vilca	Peru	1:46.39	NR
5	Javier Mirón	Spain	1:46.75	
6	Eduardo Moreira	Brazil	1:47.77	
7	Pablo Sánchez-Valladares	Spain	1:50.79	
8	Jânio Varjão	Brazil	1:53.72	

=== 1500 metres ===
12 May

Rank	Name	Nationality	Time	Notes
1st place, gold medalist(s)	Thiago André	Brazil	3:39.60	
2nd place, silver medalist(s)	Víctor Ortiz	Puerto Rico	3:40.65	
3rd place, bronze medalist(s)	Carlos Sáez	Spain	3:41.07	
4	Héctor Pagan	Puerto Rico	3:41.24	
5	Sebastián López	Venezuela	3:42.21	
6	Gerson Montes de Oca	Ecuador	3:45.72	
7	Guilherme Kurtz	Brazil	3:46.59	
8	Fernando Martínez	Mexico	3:48.80	
9	Gabriel Guzmán	Venezuela	3:48.99	
10	Diego Lacamoire	Argentina	3:49.31	
11	Luis Eduardo Viafara	Colombia	3:52.92	SB
12	Ericky dos Santos	Paraguay	4:05.73	

=== 3000 metres ===
10 May

Rank	Name	Nationality	Time	Notes
1st place, gold medalist(s)	David Ninavia	Bolivia	8:05.26	NR
2nd place, silver medalist(s)	Ignacio Velásquez	Chile	8:05.57	
3rd place, bronze medalist(s)	Pedro Marín	Colombia	8:10.22	PB
4	Guilherme Kurtz	Brazil	8:14.73	
5	Nider Pecho	Peru	8:16.11	
6	Edimar Souza	Brazil	8:16.21	
7	Gerson Montes de Oca	Ecuador	8:18.30	
8	Ericky dos Santos	Paraguay	8:19.55	
9	Oliver Díaz	Venezuela	8:20.26	NU20R
	Luis Huaman	Peru	DNF	
	Daniel Toroya	Bolivia	DNF	

=== 5000 metres ===
11 May

Rank	Name	Nationality	Time	Notes
1st place, gold medalist(s)	Altobeli da Silva	Brazil	14:27.38	
2nd place, silver medalist(s)	Pedro Marín	Colombia	14:27.65	
3rd place, bronze medalist(s)	Wendell Souza	Brazil	14:27.73	
4	David Ninavia	Bolivia	14:30.31	
5	Gabriel Guzmán	Venezuela	14:31.44	
6	Nider Pecho	Peru	14:38.65	
7	Diego Arevalo	Ecuador	14:41.84	
8	Joaquín Campos	Chile	14:46.86	
9	Julián Molina	Argentina	14:48.21	
10	Daniel Toroya	Bolivia	14:50.00	
11	Rubén Barbosa	Colombia	15:02.24	SB
	Fernando Martínez	Mexico	DNF	

=== 10 kilometres ===
12 May

Rank	Name	Nationality	Time	Notes
1st place, gold medalist(s)	Ilias Fifa	Spain	29:41	CR
2nd place, silver medalist(s)	Miguel Baidal	Spain	30:00	
3rd place, bronze medalist(s)	Fabio Correia	Brazil	30:06	
4	Nicolás Herrera	Colombia	30:16	SB
5	Wendell Souza	Brazil	30:25	
6	Nicolás Cuestas	Uruguay	30:49	
7	Rubén Barbosa	Colombia	31:15	SB
8	Daniel Toroya	Bolivia	32:20	
9	Benjamín Jiménez	El Salvador	33:20	
	Víctor Aguilar	Bolivia	DNF	

=== 110 metres hurdles ===
Heats – 11 May
Wind:
Heat 1: +0.5 m/s, Heat 2: +3.3 m/s

Rank	Heat	Name	Nationality	Time	Notes
1	2	Daniel Cisneros	Spain	13.64	Q
2	1	Eduardo de Deus	Brazil	13.75	Q
3	2	João Vítor de Oliveira	Portugal	13.79	Q
4	2	Martín Sáenz	Chile	13.84	Q
5	1	Yohan Chaverra	Colombia	13.89	Q SB
6	2	Rafael Pereira	Brazil	13.92	q
7	1	Kevin Sánchez	Spain	13.93	Q
8	1	Abdel Larrinaga	Portugal	13.95	q
9	2	Marcos Herrera	Ecuador	14.21	
10	1	Renzo Cremaschi	Argentina	14.24	
11	2	Kevin Mendieta	Paraguay	14.64	
12	1	Gabriel Mejía	Honduras	15.16	

Final – 12 May

Wind: +2.8 m/s

Rank	Lane	Name	Nationality	Time	Notes
1st place, gold medalist(s)	5	Eduardo de Deus	Brazil	13.24	
2nd place, silver medalist(s)	8	Rafael Pereira	Brazil	13.35	
3rd place, bronze medalist(s)	2	Kevin Sánchez	Spain	13.43	
4	3	Daniel Cisneros	Spain	13.44	
5	7	Martín Sáenz	Chile	13.50	
6	4	João Vítor de Oliveira	Portugal	13.62	
7	1	Abdel Larrinaga	Portugal	13.63	
8	6	Yohan Chaverra	Colombia	13.64	

=== 400 metres hurdles ===
Heats – 10 May

Rank	Heat	Name	Nationality	Time	Notes
1	2	Mikael Jesus	Portugal	49.89	Q
2	1	Guillermo Campos	Mexico	50.16	Q
3	1	Pablo Andrés Ibáñez	El Salvador	50.37	Q
4	1	Yeral Núñez	Dominican Republic	50.53	Q
5	2	Cristóbal Muñoz	Chile	51.26	Q
6	1	Iker Alfonso	Spain	51.52	q
7	2	Juander Santos	Dominican Republic	51.60	Q
8	1	Alfredo Sepúlveda	Chile	51.62	q
9	1	Neider Abello	Colombia	51.71	
10	2	Márcio Teles	Brazil	52.24	
11	2	Fanor Escobar	Colombia	53.75	SB
12	2	Julio Rodríguez	Venezuela	56.31	
13	2	Iván Britez	Paraguay	58.53	

Final – 11 May

Rank	Lane	Name	Nationality	Time	Notes
1st place, gold medalist(s)	4	Mikael Jesus	Portugal	49.20	
2nd place, silver medalist(s)	6	Guillermo Campos	Mexico	49.27	NR
3rd place, bronze medalist(s)	8	Yeral Núñez	Dominican Republic	49.60	
4	7	Pablo Andrés Ibáñez	El Salvador	49.65	
5	3	Juander Santos	Dominican Republic	49.89	
6	5	Cristóbal Muñoz	Chile	50.52	
7	1	Iker Alfonso	Spain	50.94	
8	2	Alfredo Sepúlveda	Chile	53.03	

=== 3000 metres steeplechase ===
10 May

Rank	Name	Nationality	Time	Notes
1st place, gold medalist(s)	Alejandro Quijada	Spain	8:36.03	
2nd place, silver medalist(s)	Altobeli da Silva	Brazil	8:37.13	
3rd place, bronze medalist(s)	Diddier Rodríguez	Panama	8:39.22	NR
4	José Eduardo Rodríguez	Mexico	8:42.73	
5	Carlos San Martín	Colombia	8:45.41	
6	César Daniel Gómez	Mexico	8:49.19	
7	Víctor Ortiz	Puerto Rico	8:52.30	
8	Julián Molina	Argentina	8:53.53	
9	Diego Caldeira	Venezuela	8:54.42	
10	José Daniel González	Venezuela	8:55.98	
11	Walace Caldas	Brazil	8:57.48	
12	Carlos Johnson	Argentina	9:11.15	
	Víctor Aguilar	Bolivia	DNS	

=== 4 × 100 metres relay ===
May 12

Rank	Lane	Nation	Competitors	Time	Notes
1st place, gold medalist(s)	5	Brazil	Rodrigo do Nascimento, Felipe Bardi, Erik Cardoso, Vinícius Moraes	39.19	
2nd place, silver medalist(s)	4	Colombia	Neiker Abello, Carlos Flórez, Óscar Baltán, Jhonny Rentería	39.23	
3rd place, bronze medalist(s)	2	Argentina	Daniel Londero, Tomás Mondino, Juan Ignacio Ciampitti, Franco Florio	39.85	
4	6	Portugal	David Landin, André Prazeres, Delvis Santos, Frederico Curvelo	39.95	
5	7	Chile	Ignacio Nordetti, Benjamín Aravena, Tomás Vial, Enrique Polanco	40.10	
6	1	Peru	Fabrizio Mautino, Ismael Arevalo, Luis Angulo, Aron Earl	41.35	
	8	Paraguay	Jonatan Wolk, Misael Zalzar, Fredy Maidana, César Almirón	DNF	
	3	Dominican Republic	Christopher Valdez, José González, Érick Sánchez, Franquelo Pérez	DNF	

=== 4 × 400 metres relay ===
May 12

Rank	Lane	Nation	Competitors	Time	Notes
1st place, gold medalist(s)	6	Mexico	Edgar Isaac, Valente Mendoza, Guillermo Campos, Alejandro Díaz	3:05.73	
2nd place, silver medalist(s)	3	Colombia	Jhon Perlaza, Luis Arrieta, Manuel Henao, Raúl Palacios	3:07.09	SB
3rd place, bronze medalist(s)	5	Ecuador	Alan Minda, Steeven Salas, Katriel Angulo, Anderson Marquínez	3:08.47	
4	7	Brazil	Tiago da Silva, Maxsuel Santana, Pedro de Oliveira, Vitor de Miranda	3:09.85	
5	1	Peru	Rodrigo Cornejo, Jeffrey Cajo, Fabrizio Mautino, Marco Vilca	3:15.94	
6	2	Paraguay	Kevin Mendieta, Marcos González, Paul Wood, Jhumiler Sánchez	3:17.30	
	8	Dominican Republic	Juander Santos, Ismael Adon, Wilbert Encarnación, Yeral Núñez	DQ	R17.3.2
	4	Chile	Cristóbal Muñoz, Alfredo Sepúlveda, Rafael Muñoz, Martín Zabala	DQ	R24.19

=== 20 kilometres walk ===
11 May

Rank	Name	Nationality	Time	Notes
1st place, gold medalist(s)	Matheus Corrêa	Brazil	1:23:51	=CR
2nd place, silver medalist(s)	Álvaro López	Spain	1:24:32	
3rd place, bronze medalist(s)	Luis Henry Campos	Peru	1:24:54	
4	César Herrera	Colombia	1:25:09	
5	Max dos Santos	Brazil	1:25:35	
	Juan Manuel Cano	Argentina	DQ	

=== High jump ===
12 May

Rank	Name	Nationality	2.10	2.15	2.20	2.23	Result	Notes
1st place, gold medalist(s)	Edgar Rivera	Mexico	o	o	o	xxx	2.20	
2nd place, silver medalist(s)	Thiago Moura	Brazil	o	o	xo	xxx	2.20	
3rd place, bronze medalist(s)	Fernando Ferreira	Brazil	o	o	xxx		2.15	
4	Carlos Layoy	Argentina	o	xo	xxx		2.15	
5	Nicolás Numair	Chile	xxo	xxx			2.10	

=== Pole vault ===
12 May

Rank	Name	Nationality	4.50	4.70	4.80	4.90	5.00	5.10	5.15	5.20	5.25	5.30	5.35	5.45	5.45	5.50	5.45	Result	Notes
1st place, gold medalist(s)	Aleix Pi	Spain	–	–	–	–	o	–	–	o	–	o	–	xxx	o	x	o	5.45	
2nd place, silver medalist(s)	Isidro Leyva	Spain	–	–	–	–	o	–	–	o	–	o	–	xxx	o	x	x	5.45	
3rd place, bronze medalist(s)	Lucas Pedro	Brazil	–	–	o	–	xxo	–	o	–	xo	–	xxx					5.25	
4	Dyander Pacho	Ecuador	–	–	–	o	–	o	–	o	–	xxx						5.20	
5	Guillermo Correa	Chile	–	–	–	–	o	–	–	xxx								5.00	
6	Aurelio Leite	Brazil	o	o	o	xo	xxx											4.90	
7	Cristóbal Núñez	Chile	–	–	o	–	xxx											4.80	

=== Long jump ===
11 May

Rank	Name	Nationality	#1	#2	#3	#4	#5	#6	Result	Notes
1st place, gold medalist(s)	Emiliano Lasa	Uruguay	x	7.98	x	7.98	x	–	7.98	
2nd place, silver medalist(s)	Arnovis Dalmero	Colombia	7.78	x	7.97	x	x	x	7.97	
3rd place, bronze medalist(s)	Lucas dos Santos	Brazil	7.59	x	x	7.73	7.91	x	7.91	
4	Alejandro Parada	Cuba	7.73	7.79	7.60	x	7.67	7.65	7.79	
5	Maykel Vidal	Cuba	7.70	7.73	x	7.67	7.58	x	7.73	
6	Michael Williams	Puerto Rico	7.28	7.31	7.45	x	7.51	7.64	7.64	
7	Gabriel Boza	Brazil	7.36	x	7.44	x	x	x	7.44	
8	Brayan Piñeros	Colombia	6.85	7.21	7.12	6.91	6.97	6.52	7.21	
9	Gabriel Mejía	Honduras	6.76	6.85	6.80				6.85	
10	Fabrizio Mautino	Peru	6.73	x	6.83				6.83	
11	Gustavo Miño	Paraguay	6.27	6.26	6.26				6.27	

=== Triple jump ===
12 May

Rank	Name	Nationality	#1	#2	#3	#4	#5	#6	Result	Notes
1st place, gold medalist(s)	Almir dos Santos	Brazil	16.84	x	17.31	x	–	–	17.31	CR
2nd place, silver medalist(s)	Andy Hechavarría	Cuba	16.33	16.49	16.62	16.93	x	x	16.93	
3rd place, bronze medalist(s)	Geiner Moreno	Colombia	15.92	x	x	16.31	16.54	x	16.54	SB
4	Luis Reyes	Chile	15.97	16.10	16.31	x	x	15.70	16.31	
5	Kauam Bento	Brazil	15.65	15.59	x	x	16.25	15.89	16.25	
6	Leodan Torrealba	Venezuela	16.06	16.19	16.21	14.87	15.99	16.03	16.21	
7	Juandel Bueno	Dominican Republic	15.58	x	15.92	x	x	14.88	15.92	
8	Maximiliano Díaz	Argentina	15.39	x	15.89	x	15.33	x	15.89	
9	Santiago Theran	Colombia	14.57	14.67	14.94				14.94	
10	Jason Castro	Honduras	x	x	14.24				14.24	

=== Shot put ===
10 May

Rank	Name	Nationality	#1	#2	#3	#4	#5	#6	Result	Notes
1st place, gold medalist(s)	Francisco Belo	Portugal	20.30	20.78	20.78	x	20.50	x	20.78	
2nd place, silver medalist(s)	Darlan Romani	Brazil	20.05	20.02	20.53	x	20.03	19.93	20.53	
3rd place, bronze medalist(s)	Welington Morais	Brazil	20.07	20.12	20.51	20.28	20.25	20.11	20.51	
4	Nazareno Sasia	Argentina	x	18.83	x	20.33	20.12	19.55	20.33	
5	Tsanko Arnaudov	Portugal	19.61	19.82	19.82	x	x	19.66	19.82	
6	José Ángel Pinedo	Spain	18.71	18.65	19.36	x	18.63	18.99	19.36	
7	Ignacio Carballo	Argentina	18.29	18.73	18.99	19.15	18.82	18.87	19.15	
8	Miguel Gómez	Spain	18.09	17.60	18.68	18.42	x	18.04	18.68	

=== Discus throw ===
11 May

Rank	Name	Nationality	#1	#2	#3	#4	#5	#6	Result	Notes
1st place, gold medalist(s)	Wellinton da Cruz Filho	Brazil	x	x	58.26	60.03	60.62	62.31	62.31	
2nd place, silver medalist(s)	Diego Casas	Spain	61.91	61.10	61.68	60.95	60.17	x	61.91	
3rd place, bronze medalist(s)	Mario Díaz	Cuba	61.38	58.27	60.96	59.50	58.52	x	61.38	
4	Mauricio Ortega	Colombia	61.34	x	x	60.49	60.87	54.15	61.34	
5	Lucas Nervi	Chile	59.47	56.39	58.84	x	x	60.20	60.20	
6	Juan José Caicedo	Ecuador	59.00	59.98	59.45	59.17	59.21	x	59.98	
7	Emanuel Sousa	Portugal	57.75	58.83	59.76	58.20	59.87	x	59.87	
8	Douglas dos Reis	Brazil	57.35	56.18	x	x	x	57.79	57.79	
9	Edujose Lima	Portugal	54.13	55.31	55.23				55.31	
10	Rodrigo Cárdenas	Chile	52.53	x	52.64				52.64	
11	Winston Campbell	Honduras	50.59	x	51.53				51.53	
	Bernardo Báez	Paraguay	x	x	x				NM	

=== Hammer throw ===
10 May

Rank	Name	Nationality	#1	#2	#3	#4	#5	#6	Result	Notes
1st place, gold medalist(s)	Humberto Mansilla	Chile	70.07	71.59	72.43	71.76	73.46	75.08	75.08	
2nd place, silver medalist(s)	Jerome Vega	Puerto Rico	71.05	72.59	x	x	x	73.20	73.20	
3rd place, bronze medalist(s)	Ronald Mencía	Cuba	x	x	68.30	x	72.21	73.20	73.20	
4	Gabriel Kehr	Chile	71.79	71.31	72.11	72.35	x	72.48	72.48	
5	Allan Wolski	Brazil	69.92	69.48	69.84	71.23	x	71.89	71.89	
6	Décio Andrade	Portugal	63.14	69.29	66.42	66.35	70.16	x	70.16	
7	Rúben Antunes	Portugal	x	68.69	x	68.90	x	69.74	69.74	
8	Fabián Serna	Colombia	x	66.90	68.79	68.55	x	65.19	68.79	
9	Alencar Pereira	Brazil	67.69	65.18	66.99				67.69	
10	Joaquín Gómez	Argentina	x	x	66.37				66.37	

=== Javelin throw ===
12 May

Rank	Name	Nationality	#1	#2	#3	#4	#5	#6	Result	Notes
1st place, gold medalist(s)	Pedro Henrique Rodrigues	Brazil	81.54	77.10	77.29	79.46	75.55	85.11	85.11	CR, AR
2nd place, silver medalist(s)	Leandro Ramos	Portugal	77.79	82.66	83.09	78.33	82.18	80.52	83.09	
3rd place, bronze medalist(s)	Luiz Maurício da Silva	Brazil	72.49	79.08	80.67	82.02	81.18	76.68	82.02	
4	Billy Julio	Colombia	76.01	77.83	77.24	73.66	x	71.81	77.83	SB
5	Manu Quijera	Spain	x	76.30	73.87	74.01	75.87	75.49	76.30	
6	Giovanni Díaz	Paraguay	70.25	70.70	74.59	65.40	64.20	71.29	74.59	
7	Carlos Armenta	Mexico	69.06	69.66	x	68.73	70.55	67.12	70.55	
8	Luis Mario Taracena	Guatemala	62.57	63.25	65.80	60.81	65.21	62.55	65.80	
9	Orlando Fernández	Venezuela	65.73	65.79	61.91				65.79	
10	Lars Flaming	Paraguay	65.20	64.91	64.56				65.20	

=== Decathlon ===
10–11 May

The highest mark recorded in each event is highlighted in yellow

Rank	Athlete	Nationality	100m	LJ	SP	HJ	400m	110m H	DT	PV	JT	1500m	Points	Notes
1st place, gold medalist(s)	Andy Preciado	Ecuador	11.04	6.44	16.14	2.08	51.45	14.02	52.05	4.40	54.84	4:51.02	7913	
2nd place, silver medalist(s)	Santiago Ford	Chile	11.10	7.44	13.42	2.05	49.18	15.40	47.20	4.20	64.74	4:46.24	7892	PB
3rd place, bronze medalist(s)	Felipe dos Santos	Brazil	10.87	6.82	13.20	1.90	51.91	14.43	43.97	4.60	57.78	4:52.47	7547	
4	Estebán Ibáñez	El Salvador	10.85	6.97	11.74	1.99	47.67	14.58	33.07	4.10	53.83	4:27.25	7490	
5	Pedro de Oliveira	Brazil	10.90	7.33	13.01	1.87	48.59	15.37	42.86	NM	NM	4:52.30	6145	

== Women's results ==
=== 100 metres ===
Heats – 10 May
Wind:
Heat 1: +0.8 m/s, Heat 2: +0.8 m/s, Heat 3: +0.8 m/s

Rank	Heat	Name	Nationality	Time	Notes
1	2	Gladymar Torres	Puerto Rico	11.20	Q, NR
2	1	Vitória Cristina Rosa	Brazil	11.23	Q
3	3	Lorène Bazolo	Portugal	11.24	Q
4	3	Aimara Nazareno	Ecuador	11.26	Q
5	2	Ángela Tenorio	Ecuador	11.28	Q
6	3	Gorete Semedo	São Tomé and Príncipe	11.32	q
7	1	Angélica Gamboa	Colombia	11.37	Q PB
8	3	Laura Martínez	Colombia	11.41	q
9	2	Rosalina Santos	Portugal	11.42	
10	1	María Ignacia Montt	Chile	11.44	
11	3	Anaís Hernández	Chile	11.56	
12	2	María Florencia Lamboglia	Argentina	11.58	
13	1	Orangy Jiménez	Venezuela	11.59	
14	2	Xenia Hiebert	Paraguay	11.62	
15	1	Leticia Arispe	Bolivia	11.63	
16	3	Fiordaliza Cofil	Dominican Republic	11.67	
17	3	Lorraine Martins	Brazil	11.69	
18	2	Guadalupe Torrez	Bolivia	11.74	
19	1	Paula Daruich	Peru	11.87	
20	3	Macarena Giménez	Paraguay	11.89	
21	2	Cayetana Chirinos	Peru	11.90	

Final – 10 May

Wind: -0.6 m/s

Rank	Lane	Name	Nationality	Time	Notes
1st place, gold medalist(s)	6	Gladymar Torres	Puerto Rico	11.21	
2nd place, silver medalist(s)	4	Vitória Cristina Rosa	Brazil	11.23	
3rd place, bronze medalist(s)	2	Ángela Tenorio	Ecuador	11.26	
4	5	Lorène Bazolo	Portugal	11.30	
5	1	Gorete Semedo	São Tomé and Príncipe	11.35	
6	8	Laura Martínez	Colombia	11.36	PB
7	3	Aimara Nazareno	Ecuador	11.38	
8	7	Angélica Gamboa	Colombia	11.41	

=== 200 metres ===
Heats – 11 May
Wind:
Heat 1: +0.9 m/s, Heat 2: +1.6 m/s

Rank	Heat	Name	Nationality	Time	Notes
1	1	Anahí Suárez	Ecuador	23.17	Q
2	1	Lorène Bazolo	Portugal	23.19	Q
3	1	Ana Azevedo	Brazil	23.30	Q
4	2	Aimara Nazareno	Ecuador	23.42	Q
5	2	Lina Licona	Colombia	23.57	Q
6	2	Lorraine Martins	Brazil	23.58	Q
7	1	Orangy Jiménez	Venezuela	23.62	q
8	2	Gorete Semedo	São Tomé and Príncipe	23.62	q
9	1	Melany Bolaño	Colombia	23.85	SB
10	2	María Florencia Lamboglia	Argentina	23.93	
11	1	Alinny Delgadillo	Bolivia	24.40	
12	2	Lurdes Oliveira	Portugal	24.55	
13	2	Xenia Hiebert	Paraguay	24.80	
	1	Fiordaliza Cofil	Dominican Republic	DQ	16.8RT

Final – 12 May

Wind: +0.2 m/s

Rank	Lane	Name	Nationality	Time	Notes
1st place, gold medalist(s)	5	Aimara Nazareno	Ecuador	23.07	
2nd place, silver medalist(s)	6	Anahí Suárez	Ecuador	23.20	
3rd place, bronze medalist(s)	3	Ana Azevedo	Brazil	23.31	
4	7	Lorène Bazolo	Portugal	23.33	
5	4	Lina Licona	Colombia	23.45	SB
6	8	Lorraine Martins	Brazil	23.48	
7	2	Orangy Jiménez	Venezuela	23.65	
8	1	Gorete Semedo	São Tomé and Príncipe	23.80	

=== 400 metres ===
Heats – 11 May

Rank	Heat	Name	Nationality	Time	Notes
1	1	Gabriella Scott	Puerto Rico	51.13	Q
2	1	Anabel Medina	Dominican Republic	51.97	Q
3	2	Anny de Bassi	Brazil	52.66	Q
4	2	Nicole Caicedo	Ecuador	52.85	Q
5	1	Anahí Suárez	Ecuador	53.67	Q
6	1	Tiffani Marinho	Brazil	53.76	q
7	2	Stephanie Saavedra	Chile	53.88	Q
8	2	Paola Loboa	Colombia	54.15	q
9	2	Mariana Gancedo	Mexico	54.31	
10	1	Mónica Ríos	Mexico	54.85	
11	1	Nahomy Castro	Colombia	54.95	
12	1	Montserrath Gauto	Paraguay	57.95	
13	2	Araceli Martínez	Paraguay	1:00.19	

Final – 11 May

Rank	Lane	Name	Nationality	Time	Notes
1st place, gold medalist(s)	5	Gabriella Scott	Puerto Rico	50.99	
2nd place, silver medalist(s)	7	Anabel Medina	Dominican Republic	51.35	
3rd place, bronze medalist(s)	4	Nicole Caicedo	Ecuador	51.65	
4	6	Anny de Bassi	Brazil	52.00	
5	8	Anahí Suárez	Ecuador	53.67	
6	2	Paola Loboa	Colombia	54.04	
7	1	Tiffani Marinho	Brazil	54.07	
8	3	Stephanie Saavedra	Chile	54.16	

=== 800 metres ===
Heats – 10 May

Rank	Heat	Name	Nationality	Time	Notes
1	1	Jaqueline Weber	Brazil	2:06.39	Q
2	1	Déborah Rodríguez	Uruguay	2:06.71	Q
3	1	Karla Vélez	Colombia	2:07.06	Q
4	1	Valentina Barrientos	Chile	2:07.25	q
5	2	Berdine Castillo	Chile	2:07.37	Q
6	2	Zoya Naumov	Spain	2:07.55	Q
7	2	Rosangelica Escobar	Colombia	2:07.59	Q
8	2	Martina Escudero	Argentina	2:07.64	q
9	1	Tania Guasace	Bolivia	2:14.15	
10	2	Cecilia Gómez	Bolivia	2:14.38	
11	2	María Hortensia Caballero	Paraguay	2:16.14	
12	1	Luciana Fernández	Peru	2:20.73	
13	1	Araceli Martínez	Paraguay	2:20.93	

Final – 11 May

Rank	Name	Nationality	Time	Notes
1st place, gold medalist(s)	Berdine Castillo	Chile	2:00.84	
2nd place, silver medalist(s)	Jaqueline Weber	Brazil	2:01.64	
3rd place, bronze medalist(s)	Déborah Rodríguez	Uruguay	2:03.32	
4	Zoya Naumov	Spain	2:04.15	
5	Rosangelica Escobar	Colombia	2:05.56	SB
6	Karla Vélez	Colombia	2:06.39	SB
7	Martina Escudero	Argentina	2:06.70	
8	Valentina Barrientos	Chile	2:08.04	

=== 1500 metres ===
12 May

Rank	Name	Nationality	Time	Notes
1st place, gold medalist(s)	María Pía Fernández	Uruguay	4:11.65	
2nd place, silver medalist(s)	Anita Poma	Peru	4:12.33	NR
3rd place, bronze medalist(s)	Alma Cortes	Mexico	4:12.36	
4	July da Silva	Brazil	4:13.94	
5	Josefa Quezada	Chile	4:15.43	
6	Shellcy Sarmiento	Colombia	4:15.70	PB
7	Fedra Luna	Argentina	4:16.25	
8	Andrea Calderón	Ecuador	4:29.18	
9	María Hortensia Caballero	Paraguay	4:33.44	

=== 3000 metres ===
12 May

Rank	Name	Nationality	Time	Notes
1st place, gold medalist(s)	Alma Cortes	Mexico	9:09.52	
2nd place, silver medalist(s)	Fedra Luna	Argentina	9:12.71	
3rd place, bronze medalist(s)	Carolina Lozano	Argentina	9:17.59	
4	Benita Parra	Bolivia	9:40.44	
5	Andrea Calderón	Ecuador	9:45.67	
6	Mirelle da Silva	Brazil	9:49.34	
7	Luisa Giampaoli	Brazil	10:58.24	

=== 5000 metres ===
11 May

Rank	Name	Nationality	Time	Notes
1st place, gold medalist(s)	Laura Priego	Spain	16:13.97	
2nd place, silver medalist(s)	Micaela Rivera Wood	Peru	16:14.56	
3rd place, bronze medalist(s)	Carolina Lozano	Argentina	16:16.94	
4	Shellcy Sarmiento	Colombia	16:36.09	PB
5	Benita Parra	Bolivia	16:48.06	
6	Leidy Lozano	Colombia	17:09.64	
7	Viviana Aroche	Guatemala	17:13.11	
8	Simone Ferraz	Brazil	17:48.23	
	Jenifer Silva	Brazil	DNF	

=== 10 kilometres ===
12 May

Rank	Name	Nationality	Time	Notes
1st place, gold medalist(s)	Mary Granja	Ecuador	34:25	CR, SB
2nd place, silver medalist(s)	Silvia Ortiz	Ecuador	34:43	
3rd place, bronze medalist(s)	Alicia Berzosa	Spain	35:04	
4	Nubia Silva	Brazil	35:06	
5	Leidy Lozano	Colombia	35:15	PB
6	Amanda de Oliveira	Brazil	35:18	
7	Lina Pantoja	Colombia	35:54	SB
8	Idelma Delgado	El Salvador	39:20	

=== 100 metres hurdles ===
12 May
Wind: +0.2 m/s

Rank	Lane	Name	Nationality	Time	Notes
1st place, gold medalist(s)	6	Paola Vásquez	Puerto Rico	13.03	
2nd place, silver medalist(s)	5	Ketiley Batista	Brazil	13.22	
3rd place, bronze medalist(s)	4	Paula Blanquer	Spain	13.33	
4	3	Claudia Villalante	Spain	13.43	
5	2	Vitoria Alves	Brazil	13.46	
6	8	Ariday Salcedo	Mexico	13.73	
7	1	Rossmary Paredes	Paraguay	15.04	
	7	María Alejandra Rocha	Colombia	DNF	

=== 400 metres hurdles ===
Heats – 10 May

Rank	Heat	Name	Nationality	Time	Notes
1	1	Daniela Fra	Spain	56.54	Q
2	2	Vera Barbosa	Portugal	56.85	Q
3	2	Grace Claxton	Puerto Rico	56.89	Q
4	1	Chayenne da Silva	Brazil	57.52	Q
5	2	Daniela Rojas	Costa Rica	57.86	Q
6	2	Marlene dos Santos	Brazil	58.88	q
7	2	Valeria Cabezas	Colombia	59.31	q
8	1	Virginia Villalba	Ecuador	59.54	Q
9	1	Luz Castro	Colombia	1:03.79	
	1	María Violeta Arnáiz	Chile	DNF	

Final – 11 May

Rank	Lane	Name	Nationality	Time	Notes
1st place, gold medalist(s)	5	Grace Claxton	Puerto Rico	55.41	
2nd place, silver medalist(s)	4	Daniela Fra	Spain	55.73	
3rd place, bronze medalist(s)	7	Chayenne da Silva	Brazil	56.22	
4	6	Vera Barbosa	Portugal	56.37	
5	8	Daniela Rojas	Costa Rica	56.61	
6	1	Valeria Cabezas	Colombia	57.77	SB
7	3	Virginia Villalba	Ecuador	57.96	
8	2	Marlene dos Santos	Brazil	59.53	

=== 3000 metres steeplechase ===
10 May

Rank	Name	Nationality	Time	Notes
1st place, gold medalist(s)	Tatiane Raquel da Silva	Brazil	9:46.25	
2nd place, silver medalist(s)	Simone Ferraz	Brazil	9:52.93	
3rd place, bronze medalist(s)	Alondra Negron	Puerto Rico	10:01.19	
4	Stefany López	Colombia	10:34.02	

=== 4 × 100 metres relay ===
May 12

Rank	Lane	Nation	Competitors	Time	Notes
1st place, gold medalist(s)	6	Brazil	Gabriela Mourão, Ana Azevedo, Lorraine Martins, Vitória Cristina Rosa	43.54	
2nd place, silver medalist(s)	7	Colombia	Marlet Ospino, Angélica Gamboa, Laura Martínez, Evelyn Rivera	44.34	
3rd place, bronze medalist(s)	4	Chile	Viviana Olivares, María Ignacia Montt, Isidora Jiménez, Anaís Hernández	44.56	
4	3	Portugal	Beatriz Andrade, Rosalina Santos, Iris Silva, Lorène Bazolo	44.57	
5	2	Bolivia	Lauren Mendoza, Guadalupe Torrez, Alinny Delgadillo, Leticia Arispe	45.09	NR
6	8	Ecuador	Aimara Nazareno, Anahí Suárez, Evelin Mercado, Ángela Tenorio	45.47	
7	5	Peru	Bianca Conroy, Paula Daruich, Laura Vila, Cayetana Chirinos	46.91	

=== 4 × 400 metres relay ===
May 12

Rank	Lane	Nation	Competitors	Time	Notes
1st place, gold medalist(s)	6	Brazil	Anny de Bassi, Maria de Sena, Jainy Barreto, Letícia Lima	3:30.72	SB
2nd place, silver medalist(s)	7	Colombia	Rosana Palacios, Karla Vélez, Jennifer Padilla, Lina Licona	3:33.20	SB
3rd place, bronze medalist(s)	4	Ecuador	Virginia Villalba, Anahí Suárez, Evelin Mercado, Nicole Caicedo	3:33.71	NR
4	5	Chile	Stephanie Saavedra, Poulette Cardoch, Berdine Castillo, María Violeta Arnaiz	3:38.04	

=== 20 kilometres walk ===
11 May

Rank	Name	Nationality	Time	Notes
1st place, gold medalist(s)	Evelyn Inga	Peru	1:32:46	CR
2nd place, silver medalist(s)	Paula Juárez	Spain	1:34:42	
3rd place, bronze medalist(s)	Gabriela Muniz	Brazil	1:38:33	
4	Mayra Quispe	Bolivia	1:41:42	
5	Mayara Vicentainer	Brazil	1:42:28	

=== High jump ===
10 May

Rank	Name	Nationality	1.70	1.75	1.78	1.81	1.84	1.86	1.88	1.91	Result	Notes
1st place, gold medalist(s)	Valdiléia Martins	Brazil	–	–	o	o	o	o	xo	xxr	1.88	
2nd place, silver medalist(s)	Marysabel Senyu	Dominican Republic	o	o	o	o	xo	xxo	xxx		1.86	
3rd place, bronze medalist(s)	María Arboleda	Colombia	o	o	o	o	xxo	xxo	xxx		1.86	=PB
4	Una Stancev	Spain	o	o	o	o	xxx				1.81	
5	Jennifer Rodríguez	Colombia	o	o	o	xo	xxx				1.81	SB
6	Joice Micolta	Ecuador	o	o	o	xxx					1.78	
7	Maria Eduarda Barbosa	Brazil	–	o	xo	xxx					1.78	
8	Saleta Fernández	Spain	xo	o	xxx						1.75	

=== Pole vault ===
10 May

Rank	Name	Nationality	2.90	3.10	3.30	3.50	3.70	3.80	3.90	4.05	4.10	4.15	4.20	4.25	4.30	4.35	4.40	4.45	4.50	4.60	Result	Notes
1st place, gold medalist(s)	Robeilys Peinado	Venezuela	–	–	–	–	–	–	–	–	o	–	o	–	o	–	o	–	xo	xxx	4.50	
2nd place, silver medalist(s)	Andrea San José	Spain	–	–	–	–	–	–	–	–	o	–	–	o	–	xxo	–	xxx			4.35	
3rd place, bronze medalist(s)	Katherine Castillo	Colombia	–	–	–	–	–	–	–	–	xo	–	o	–	o	–	xxx				4.30	=NR
4	Beatriz Chagas	Brazil	–	–	–	–	–	–	o	o	–	xo	–	xo	–	xxx					4.25	
5	Antonia Crestani	Chile	–	–	–	o	xxx														3.50	
6	Josefina Britez	Paraguay	–	o	o	xxx															3.30	
7	Florencia Britez	Paraguay	o	xxx																	2.90	
	Luna Nazarit	Colombia	–	–	–	–	–	xxx													NM	

=== Long jump ===
10 May

Rank	Name	Nationality	#1	#2	#3	#4	#5	#6	Result	Notes
1st place, gold medalist(s)	Natalia Linares	Colombia	6.54	6.42	6.82	6.66	6.59	6.51	6.82	SB
2nd place, silver medalist(s)	Lissandra Campos	Brazil	6.53	6.44	6.43	6.39	x	6.49	6.53	
3rd place, bronze medalist(s)	Eliane Martins	Brazil	6.29	x	6.44	x	6.47	6.26	6.47	
4	Nathalee Aranda	Panama	6.42	6.31	6.42	x	6.34	x	6.42	
5	Paola Fernández	Puerto Rico	6.11	6.26	6.36	6.17	6.37	6.31	6.37	
6	Alysbeth Félix	Puerto Rico	5.94	6.17	6.04	6.07	6.01	6.04	6.17	
7	Dana Jiménez	Colombia	x	x	5.60	6.06	6.14	5.77	6.14	
8	Paola Mautino	Peru	5.82	5.89	x	x	5.68	5.86	5.89	
9	Antonia Crestani	Chile	x	5.48	5.56				5.56	
10	Noelia Vera	Paraguay	5.42	x	5.55				5.55	
11	Luciana Román	Paraguay	5.04	5.10	5.22				5.22	

=== Triple jump ===
11 May

Rank	Name	Nationality	#1	#2	#3	#4	#5	#6	Result	Notes
1st place, gold medalist(s)	Gabriele dos Santos	Brazil	13.58	13.68	13.52	x	x	x	13.68	
2nd place, silver medalist(s)	Regiclécia da Silva	Brazil	12.47	13.17	13.11	x	13.23	x	13.23	
3rd place, bronze medalist(s)	Valeria Quispe	Bolivia	x	13.11	x	x	13.05	x	13.11	
4	Estrella Lobo	Colombia	13.00	12.88	x	13.06	x	x	13.06	SB
5	Valery Arce	Colombia	12.45	12.19	12.45	–	12.35	12.11	12.45	

=== Shot put ===
11 May

Rank	Name	Nationality	#1	#2	#3	#4	#5	#6	Result	Notes
1st place, gold medalist(s)	Eliana Bandeira	Portugal	x	x	17.19	x	17.72	18.30	18.30	
2nd place, silver medalist(s)	Ivana Gallardo	Chile	16.57	x	17.26	x	17.00	17.09	17.26	
3rd place, bronze medalist(s)	Ana Caroline Silva	Brazil	16.72	17.10	17.17	17.12	x	17.18	17.18	
4	Natalia Duco	Chile	16.74	16.61	16.69	16.43	16.66	16.63	16.74	
5	Ahymara Espinoza	Venezuela	x	16.08	16.59	16.43	16.66	15.84	16.66	
6	Lívia Avancini	Brazil	16.40	16.40	x	x	16.57	16.33	16.57	
7	Rosa Ramírez	Dominican Republic	x	15.89	16.13	16.00	16.49	16.30	16.49	
8	Yerlin Mesa	Colombia	14.61	14.95	x	15.86	15.98	16.12	16.12	SB

=== Discus throw ===
11 May

Rank	Name	Nationality	#1	#2	#3	#4	#5	#6	Result	Notes
1st place, gold medalist(s)	Izabela da Silva	Brazil	62.42	63.60	x	60.77	x	60.77	63.60	
2nd place, silver medalist(s)	Andressa de Morais	Brazil	58.90	60.37	58.58	x	59.75	58.24	60.37	
3rd place, bronze medalist(s)	Silinda Morales	Cuba	57.91	x	56.50	57.31	58.16	57.60	58.16	
4	Karen Gallardo	Chile	x	55.12	55.96	50.77	50.91	x	55.96	
5	Verónica Luzania	Mexico	54.49	52.47	x	53.56	52.87	51.54	54.49	
6	Yerlin Mesa	Colombia	54.11	54.34	x	53.08	51.24	54.30	54.34	SB
7	Ailén Armada	Argentina	52.78	53.90	x	52.95	51.40	53.41	53.90	
8	Ottaynis Febres	Venezuela	43.91	34.66	47.25	45.87	45.68	47.91	47.91	

=== Hammer throw ===
10 May

Rank	Name	Nationality	#1	#2	#3	#4	#5	#6	Result	Notes
1st place, gold medalist(s)	Rosa Rodríguez	Venezuela	67.56	70.75	70.95	69.61	x	x	70.95	
2nd place, silver medalist(s)	Ximena Zorrilla	Peru	66.60	68.47	63.91	x	67.13	66.45	68.47	
3rd place, bronze medalist(s)	Mayra Gaviria	Colombia	59.46	62.75	65.56	64.79	66.92	62.15	66.92	
4	Carolina Ulloa	Colombia	62.33	59.35	56.91	x	61.82	62.40	62.40	SB
5	Mariana García	Chile	62.13	61.41	62.08	61.04	x	x	62.13	
6	Mariana Marcelino	Brazil	x	59.26	61.62	61.32	60.02	61.04	61.62	
7	Mariana Pestana	Portugal	58.45	60.05	60.39	57.07	61.40	x	61.40	
8	Yenniver Veroes	Venezuela	55.69	x	58.03	56.98	54.94	56.49	58.03	
9	Mveh Gracielle	Brazil	56.22	x	x				56.22	
10	Nereida Santacruz	Ecuador	53.54	x	54.91				54.91	
11	Nair Godoy	Paraguay	40.97	43.95	43.27				43.95	

=== Javelin throw ===
12 May

Rank	Name	Nationality	#1	#2	#3	#4	#5	#6	Result	Notes
1st place, gold medalist(s)	Flor Ruiz	Colombia	59.07	65.36	66.70	62.83	–	–	66.70	AR, WL
2nd place, silver medalist(s)	Jucilene de Lima	Brazil	57.68	62.31	x	61.08	59.43	61.49	62.31	
3rd place, bronze medalist(s)	Manuela Rotundo	Uruguay	56.90	61.84	59.79	54.07	56.27	51.14	61.84	AU23R, NR
4	María Lucelly Murillo	Colombia	56.83	x	57.80	x	56.05	x	57.80	
5	Luz Castro	Mexico	51.12	52.85	54.42	x	50.40	52.10	54.42	
6	Cláudia Ferreira	Portugal	49.07	49.52	50.35	52.85	53.35	50.33	53.35	
7	Laila Ferrer e Silva	Brazil	49.06	49.65	52.24	49.28	x	x	52.24	
8	Arantza Moreno	Spain	50.79	48.23	49.35	x	50.38	48.93	50.79	
9	Fiorella Veloso	Paraguay	40.76	42.98	48.52				48.52	
10	María José Cáceres	Paraguay	37.02	35.83	38.37				38.37	

=== Heptathlon ===
11–12 May

The highest mark recorded in each event is highlighted in yellow

Rank	Athlete	Nationality	100m H	HJ	SP	200m	LJ	JT	800m	Points	Notes
1st place, gold medalist(s)	Martha Araújo	Colombia	12.91 PB	1.64	13.82	24.23	6.32	48.61	2:19.54	6274	CR, PB
2nd place, silver medalist(s)	Lilian Borja	Mexico	13.97	1.73	11.92	25.18	5.37	42.74	2:17.75	5637	
3rd place, bronze medalist(s)	Tamara de Sousa	Brazil	14.33	1.76	14.36	25.80	5.81	42.14	2:35.63	5617	
4	Ana Camila Pirelli	Paraguay	14.21	1.61	13.14	25.71	5.22	42.97	2:21.62	5402	
5	Joyce Micolta	Ecuador	14.86	1.73	11.30	27.24	5.54	36.67	2:33.84	5020	
6	Yudisa Martínez	Colombia	15.20	1.61	11.66	26.34	5.27	40.03	2:42.56	4815	PB

== Mixed results ==
=== 4 × 400 metres relay ===
May 10

Rank	Lane	Nation	Competitors	Time	Notes
1st place, gold medalist(s)	7	Brazil	Vitor de Miranda, Maria de Sena, Tiago da Silva, Letícia Lima	3:17.85	CR
2nd place, silver medalist(s)	5	Ecuador	Alan Minda, Virginia Villaba, Steeven Salas, Evelin Mercado	3:23.63	
3rd place, bronze medalist(s)	6	Colombia	Estebán Bermúdez, Nahomy Castro, Óscar Leal, Paola Loboa	3:25.10	NU20R
4	4	Chile	Martín Zabala, Valentina Barrientos, Alejandro Peirano, Poulette Cardoch	3:27.06	
5	3	Peru	Rodrigo Cornejo, Laura Vila, Jeffrey Cajo, Luciana Fernández	3:33.41	
6	8	Paraguay	Marcos González, Araceli Martínez, Paul Wood, Montserrath Gauto	3:34.79	NR
