= 2023 Mediterranean Athletics U23 Indoor Championships =

Athletics competition held in Valencia, Spain

- Dates: 22 January 2023
- Host city: Valencia, Spain
- Venue: Velódromo Luis Puig
- Level: Mediterranean Athletics U23 Indoor Championships
- Events: 15

The 2023 Mediterranean Athletics U23 Indoor Championships was the 2nd edition of the Mediterranean athletics championship for under-23 athletes. It was held in Valencia, Spain at the Velódromo Luis Puig on 22 January 2023.

The Spanish team won four gold medals at the event.

== Medal summary ==
=== Men ===
Event	Gold		Silver		Bronze	
60m	William Aguessy; France	6.71	Edhem Vikalo; Bosnia and Herzegovina	6.73	Matteo Melluzzo; Italy	6.74
400m	Markel Fernández; Spain	46.99	Jakov Vukovic; Croatia	47.55	Lorenzo Benati; Italy	47.71
800m	Yanis Meziane; France	1:51.91	David Carranza; Spain	1:52.79	Paul Anselmini; France	1:52.84
1500m	Mohamed Attaoui; Spain	3:53.89	Flavien Szot; France	3:54.16	Thomas Piquart; France	3:54.53
60mH	Christos-Panagiotis Roumtsios; Greece	7.90	Kenny Fletcher; France	7.93	Mario Revenga; Spain	7.93
High Jump	Edoardo Stronati; Italy	2.17 m	Jason Bayindoula; France	2.14 m	Paul Metayer; France	2.08 m
Triple Jump	Thomas Martinez; France	15.73 m	Federico Lorenzo Bruno; Italy	15.70 m	Batuhan Çakır; Turkey	15.22 m
Shot Put	Miguel Gómez; Spain	18.77 m	Riccardo Ferrara; Italy	18.75 m	Stephen Mailagi; France	17.96 m

=== Women ===
Event	Gold		Silver		Bronze	
60m	Polyniki Emmanouilidou; Greece	7.37	Hillary Gode; France	7.42	Hope Eghonghon Esekheigbe; Italy	7.43
400m	Veronika Drljacic; Croatia	54.16	Berta Segura; Spain	54.88	Laura Elena Rami; Italy	55.11
800m	Nina Vuković; Croatia	2:09.09	Julia Cherot; France	2:09.17	Sofia Bella; Italy	2:10.64
1500m	Klara Andrijašević; Croatia	4:24.07	Mireya Arnedillo; Spain	4:24.27	María González; Spain	4:24.93
60mH	Paula Blanquer; Spain	8.16	Claudia Villalante; Spain	8.24	Lea Vendôme; France	8.28
Pole Vault	Elina Giallurachis; France	4.35 m	Marie-Julie Bonnin; France	4.35 m	Giulia Valletti Borgnini; Italy	4.15 m
Long Jump	Larissa Iapichino; Italy	6.45 m	Tessy Ebosele; Spain	6.24 m	Evelyn Yankey; Spain	6.18 m

== Medal table ==
Rank	Nation	Gold	Silver	Bronze	Total
1	France (FRA)	4	6	5	15
2	Spain (ESP)	4	5	3	12
3	Croatia (CRO)	3	1	0	4
4	Italy (ITA)	2	2	6	10
5	Greece (GRE)	2	0	0	2
6	Bosnia and Herzegovina (BIH)	0	1	0	1
7	Turkey (TUR)	0	0	1	1
Totals (7 entries)		15	15	15	45
