= 2021 World Athletics Relays =

Athletics competition in Chorzów, Poland

- Host city: Chorzów, Poland
- Events: 9
- Dates: 1–2 May
- Main venue: Silesian Stadium

The 2021 World Athletics Relays have been held in Chorzów, Poland from 1 to 2 May 2021.

== Schedule ==
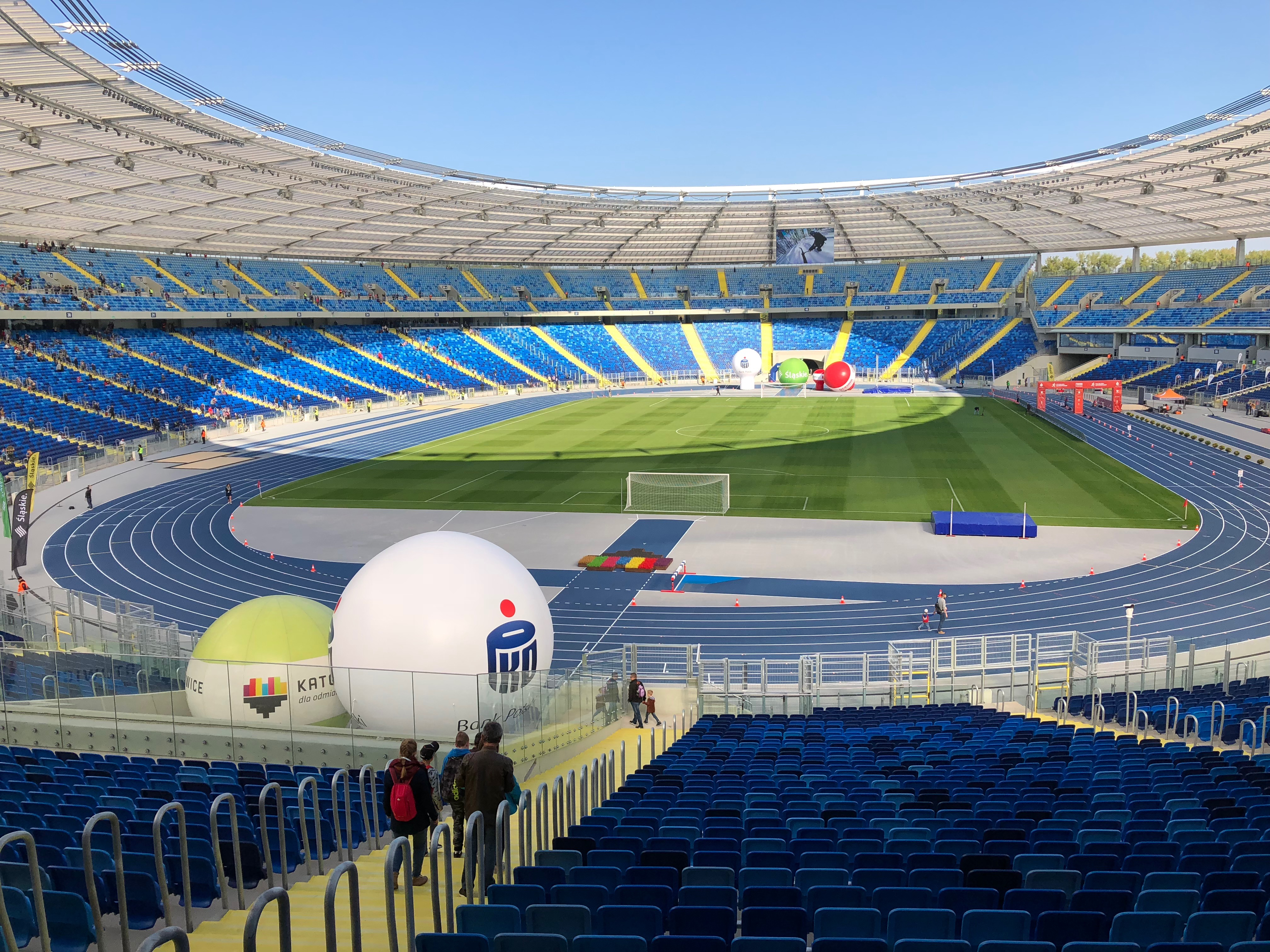
Silesia Stadium, the venue.

Day 1 - Saturday 1 May 2021
Time	Event	Round
~~18:30~~	~~Mixed Hurdle Relay~~	~~Heats~~
19:00	Women's 4 × 400 m	Heats
19:35	Men's 4 × 400 m	Heats
20:08	Women's 4 × 100 m	Heats
20:39	Men's 4 × 100 m	Heats
21:08	Mixed 2 × 2 × 400 m	Final
21:22	Mixed 4 × 400 m	Heats
21:58	Mixed Hurdle Relay	Final

Day 2 - Sunday 2 May 2021
Time	Event	Round
~~18:30~~	~~Women's 4 × 200 m~~	~~Heats~~
~~18:55~~	~~Men's 4 × 200 m~~	~~Heats~~
19:20	Mixed 4 × 400 m	Final
19:35	Men's 4 × 100 m	Final
19:46	Women's 4 × 100 m	Final
19:59	Women's 4 × 200 m	Final
20:13	Men's 4 × 200 m	Final
20:26	Women's 4 × 400 m	Final
20:42	Men's 4 × 400 m	Final

== Winners summary ==
There are no medalists but winners in each event.

=== Men ===
Event	Gold		Silver		Bronze	
4 × 100 metres relay	Italy; Fausto Desalu; Marcell Jacobs; Davide Manenti; Filippo Tortu	39.21	Japan; Ryuichiro Sakai; Ryota Suzuki; Daisuke Miyamoto; Hiroki Yanagita	39.42	Denmark; Simon Hansen; Tazana Kamanga-Dyrbak; Kojo Musah; Frederik Schou-Nielsen	39.56
4 × 200 metres relay	Germany; Steven Müller; Felix Straub; Lucas Ansah-Peprah; Owen Ansah	1:22.43 SB	Kenya; Mark Odhiambo; Mike Nyang'au; Elijah Mathew; Hesborn Ochieng	1:24.26 SB	Portugal; Frederico Curvelo; Delvis Santos; Diogo Antunes; André Prazeres	1:24.53 SB
4 × 400 metres relay	Netherlands; Jochem Dobber; Liemarvin Bonevacia; Ramsey Angela; Tony van Diepen	3:03.45	Japan; Rikuya Ito; Kaito Kawabata; Kentaro Sato; Aoto Suzuki	3:04.45	Botswana; Isaac Makwala; Boitumelo Masilo; Ditiro Nzamani; Leungo Scotch	3:04.77

=== Women ===
Event	Gold		Silver		Bronze	
4 × 100 metres relay	Italy; Irene Siragusa; Gloria Hooper; Anna Bongiorni; Vittoria Fontana	43.79 SB	Poland; Magdalena Stefanowicz; Klaudia Adamek; Katarzyna Sokólska; Pia Skrzyszowska	44.10	Netherlands; Jamile Samuel; Dafne Schippers; Nadine Visser; Naomi Sedney	44.10
4 × 200 metres relay	Poland; Paulina Guzowska; Kamila Ciba; Klaudia Adamek; Marlena Gola	1:34.98 NR	Ireland; Aoife Lynch; Kate Doherty; Sarah Quinn; Sophie Becker	1:35.93 NR	Ecuador; Ángela Tenorio; Virginia Villalba; Marizol Landázuri; Anahí Suárez	1:36.86 SB
4 × 400 metres relay	Cuba; Zurian Hechavarría; Rose Mary Almanza; Lisneidy Veitía; Roxana Gómez	3:28.41	Poland; Kornelia Lesiewicz; Małgorzata Hołub-Kowalik; Karolina Łozowska; Natalia Kaczmarek	3:28.81	Great Britain; Laviai Nielsen; Ama Pipi; Emily Diamond; Jessie Knight	3:29.27

=== Mixed ===
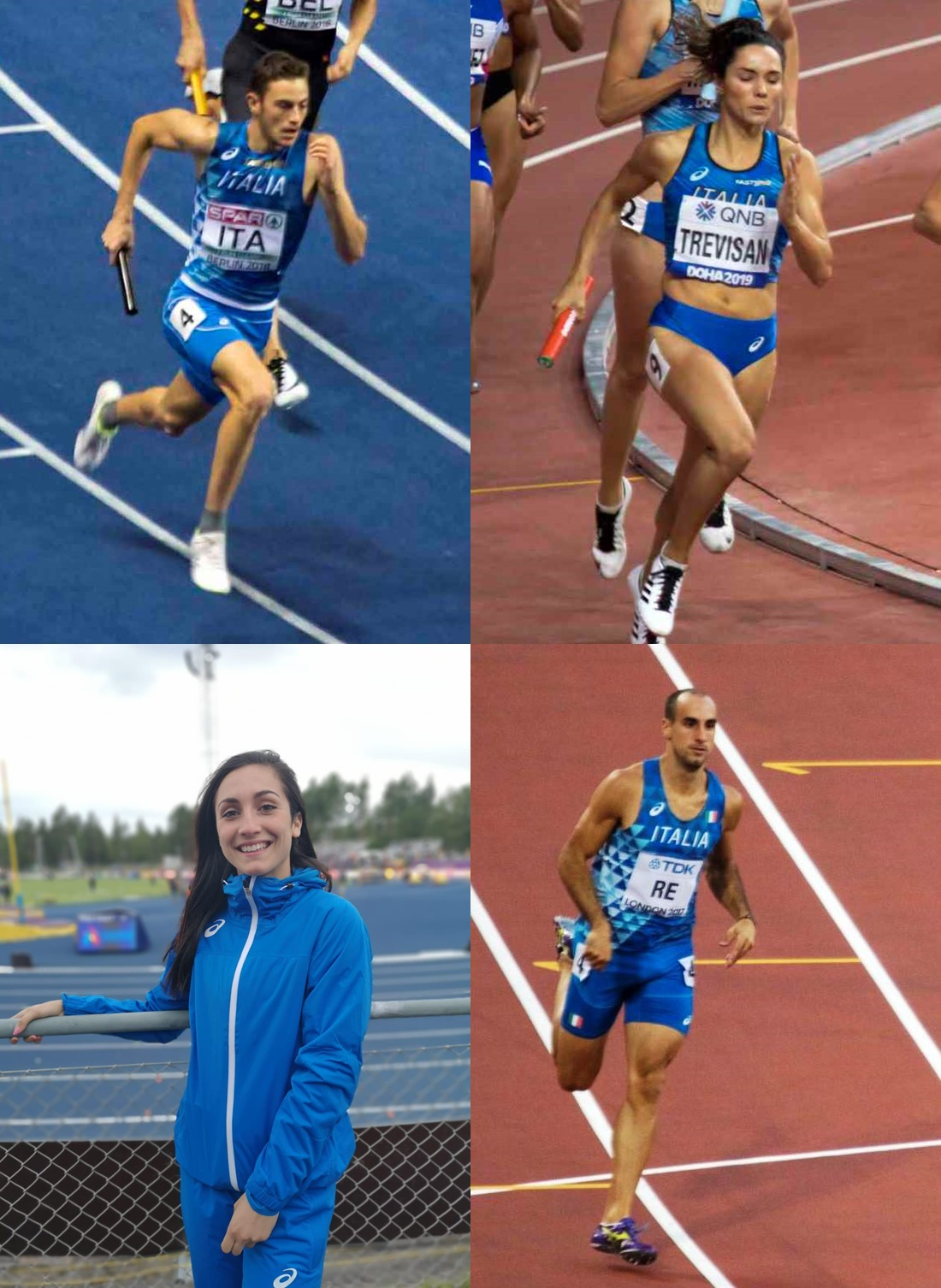
From the top left: Scotti, Trevisan, Mangione and Re, the Italian national track relay team winners of the 4x400 m mixed relay.

Event	Gold		Silver		Bronze	
4 × 400 metres relay details	Italy; Edoardo Scotti; Giancarla Trevisan; Alice Mangione; Davide Re	3:16.60	Brazil; Anderson Henriques; Tiffani Marinho; Geisa Coutinho; Alison dos Santos	3:17.54	Dominican Republic; Lidio Féliz; Anabel Medina Ventura; Marileidy Paulino; Alexander Ogando	3:17.58
2 × 2 × 400 metres relay details	Poland; Joanna Jóźwik; Patryk Dobek	3:40.92	Kenya; Naomi Korir; Ferguson Rotich	3:41.79	Slovenia; Anita Horvat; Žan Rudolf	3:41.95
Shuttle hurdles relay details	Germany; Monika Zapalska; Erik Balnuweit; Anne Weigold; Gregor Traber	56.53	Poland; Zuzanna Hulisz; Krzysztof Kiljan; Klaudia Wojtunik; Damian Czykier	56.68	Kenya; Priscilla Tabunda; Michael Nzuku; Nusra Rukia; Wiseman Mukhobe	59.89

== Winners positions ==
As the World Athletics Relays are not a championship, there are no champions or medalists, but just winners.

* Host nation (Poland)

Rank	Nation	Gold	Silver	Bronze	Total
1	Italy (ITA)	3	0	0	3
2	Poland (POL)*	2	3	0	5
3	Germany (GER)	2	0	0	2
4	Netherlands (NED)	1	0	1	2
5	Cuba (CUB)	1	0	0	1
6	Kenya (KEN)	0	2	1	3
7	Japan (JPN)	0	2	0	2
8	Brazil (BRA)	0	1	0	1
8	Ireland (IRL)	0	1	0	1
10	Botswana (BOT)	0	0	1	1
10	Denmark (DEN)	0	0	1	1
10	Dominican Republic (DOM)	0	0	1	1
10	Ecuador (ECU)	0	0	1	1
10	Great Britain (GBR)	0	0	1	1
10	Portugal (POR)	0	0	1	1
10	Slovenia (SLO)	0	0	1	1
Totals (16 entries)		9	9	9	27

== Team standings ==
Teams scored for every place in the top 8 with 8 points awarded for first place, 7 for second, etc. The overall points winner was given the Golden Baton.

The host country is highlighted in lavender blue

Rank	Nation	Points
1	Poland	37
2	Italy	33
3	Kenya	24
4	Netherlands	20
T-5	Germany	19
T-5	Japan	19
7	Ecuador	15
8	Denmark	14
T-9	Great Britain	10
T-9	Portugal	10

== Participating nations ==
37 nations were due to take part in the competition, before the renouncement of Canada, India, Jamaica, Nigeria, and Trinidad and Tobago. Other notable absences include Australia, China and the USA, who will all be missing the event for the first time. Zambia are set to make their debut.

Spanish Ángel David Rodríguez, 41, is the oldest athlete entered for the event, while 17-year-old Nigerian sprinter Imaobong Nse Uko is the youngest competitor.

- Belarus (13)
- Belgium (12)
- Botswana (21)
- Brazil (20)
- ~~Canada~~ (26)
- Chile (6)
- Colombia (9)
- Cuba (5)
- Czech Republic (31)
- Denmark (12)
- Dominican Republic (6)
- Ecuador (10)
- France (40)
- Germany (40)
- Ghana (11)
- Great Britain (16)
- ~~India~~ (20)
- Ireland (16)
- Italy (38)
- ~~Jamaica~~ (39)
- Japan (29)
- Kenya (36)
- Netherlands (24)
- ~~Nigeria~~ (24)
- Poland (44)
- Portugal (16)
- Puerto Rico (5)
- Slovakia (10)
- Slovenia (2)
- South Africa (16)
- Spain (40)
- Switzerland (14)
- ~~Trinidad and Tobago~~ (8)
- Turkey (16)
- Ukraine (5)
- Zambia (5)
- Zimbabwe (7)
