= Trofeo Luis Puig =

Spanish one-day road cycling race

Race details
- Date: Late January/February
- Region: Comunidad Valenciana, Spain
- Local name(s): Gran Premio Valencia (1969−1979); Trofeo Luis Puig (1981−2005); Clàssica Comunitat Valenciana 1969 (2021−)
- Discipline: Road
- Competition: UCI Europe Tour
- Type: Single-day
- Web site: voltalamarina.com/classica-comunitat-valenciana-1969-gran-premio-valencia

History
- First edition: 1969
- Editions: 42 (as of 2026)
- First winner: (Spain) Carlos Echeverría
- Most wins: (Belgium) Noël Dejonckheere (Germany) Erik Zabel (3 wins)
- Most recent: (Netherlands) Dylan Groenewegen

The Trofeo Luis Puig is a single-day road bicycle race held in Valencian Community, Spain. Originally named the Gran Premio Valencia, it was held annually (except for 1980) from the first edition in 1969 until 2005, in which year it was promoted to be a 1.1 event on the UCI Europe Tour. It was then not run for 16 years, until re-introduced under the name Clàssica Comunitat Valenciana 1969, as the opening event of the 2021 UCI Europe Tour as a race of 1.2 status. In 2023, the race was upgraded to category 1.1. it is now named after Luis Puig, a prominent Spanish sports executive who server as president of the Union Cycliste Internationale.

Spanish rider Vicente Mata died after being hit by a motorist in the 1987 edition of the race.

== Winners ==
Year	Country	Rider	Team
1969	Spain	Carlos Echeverría	
1970	Spain	Ramón Sáez	
1971	Belgium	Frans Verhaegen	
1972	Belgium	Eric Leman	
1973	Belgium	Gustaaf Van Roosbroeck	
1974	Belgium	Eddy Peelman	
1975	Belgium	Eddy Peelman	
1976	Spain	Tomas Nistal	
1977	Spain	Domingo Perurena	
1978	Spain	Francisco Elorriaga	
1979	Spain	Antoine Gutierrez	
1980	No race		
1981	Belgium	Noël Dejonckheere	
1982	West Germany	Reimund Dietzen	
1983	Belgium	Noël Dejonckheere	
1984	Belgium	Noël Dejonckheere	
1985	Spain	Enrique Aja	
1986	France	Bernard Hinault	
1987	Spain	Pello Ruiz Cabestany	
1988	Portugal	Acácio da Silva	
1989	Netherlands	Mathieu Hermans	
1990	Netherlands	Tom Cordes	
1991	Germany	Andreas Kappes	
1992	Ireland	Sean Kelly	
1993	France	Laurent Jalabert	
1994	Italy	Adriano Baffi	
1995	Italy	Mario Cipollini	
1996	Belgium	Peter Van Petegem	
1997	Germany	Erik Zabel	
1998	Belgium	Andrei Tchmil	
1999	Italy	Mario Cipollini	
2000	Germany	Erik Zabel	
2001	Germany	Erik Zabel	
2002	Russia	Sergei Ivanov	
2003	Italy	Alessandro Petacchi	
2004	Spain	Óscar Freire	
2005	Italy	Alessandro Petacchi	
2006–2020	No race		
2021	France	Lorrenzo Manzin	Total Direct Énergie
2022	Italy	Giovanni Lonardi	Eolo–Kometa
2023	Belgium	Arnaud De Lie	Lotto–Dstny
2024	Netherlands	Dylan Groenewegen	Team Jayco–AlUla
2025	Switzerland	Marc Hirschi	Tudor Pro Cycling Team
2026	Netherlands	Dylan Groenewegen	Unibet Rose Rockets
