= 2019 Mediterranean Athletics U23 Indoor Championships =

Athletics competition which was held in Miramas, France

I Mediterranean Athletics U23 Indoor Championships
- Dates: 19 January 2019
- Host city: Miramas, France
- Venue: Estadio Municipal Bahía Sur
- Events: 16

The 2019 Mediterranean Athletics U23 Indoor Championships was an athletics competition which was held in Miramas, France, 19 January 2019. A total of 16 events were contested, of which 8 by male and 8 by female athletes.

== Medal summary ==
=== Men ===
Event	Gold		Silver		Bronze	
60 metres	Viktor Contaret (FRA)	6.78	Ryan Zézé (FRA)	6.79	Sergio López (ESP)	6.80
400 metres	Slimane Moula (ALG)	48.03	João Coelho (POR)	48.15	Fabrisio Saïdy (FRA)	48.43
800 metres	Pablo Sánchez-Valladares (ESP)	1:50.12	Clément Dhainaut (FRA)	1:50.20	Benjamin Robert (FRA)	1:50.25
1500 metres	Adrián Ben (ESP)	3:46.34	Hicham Akankam (MAR)	3:47.45	Pierrick Jocteur-Monrozier (FRA)	3:47.50
60 metre hurdles	Just Kwaou-Mathey (FRA)	7.90	Romain Lecœur (FRA)	7.91	Amine Bouanani (ALG)	13.86
Pole vault	Emmanouil Karalis (GRE)	5.55 m	Thibaut Collet (FRA)	5.45 m	Dario Prekl (CRO)	5.15 m
Long jump	Miltiadis Tentoglou (GRE)	7.99 m	Ivan Vujević (CRO)	7.84 m	Moukdou Saindou (FRA)	7.54 m
Shot put	Odysseas Mouzenidis (GRE)	18.62 m	Alperen Karahan (TUR)	17.69 m	Jordan Guehaseim (FRA)	17.19 m

=== Women ===
Event	Gold		Silver		Bronze	
60 metres	Paula Sevilla (ESP)	7.43	Mizgin Ay (TUR)	7.44	Diana Vaisman (ISR)	7.45
400 metres	Karyl Amaro (FRA)	54.73	Kellya Pauline (FRA)	55.10	Agata Zupin (SLO)	55.83
800 metres	Salomé Afonso (POR)	2:08.18	Khadija Benkassem (MAR)	2:08.88	Charlotte Pizzo (FRA)	2:09.90
1500 metres	Celia Antón (ESP)	4:21.21	Alexa Lemitre (FRA)	4:23.23	Marta García (ESP)	4:23.81
60 metre hurdles	Anja Lukić (SRB)	8.37	María Mugica (ESP)	8.46	Milica Emini (SRB)	8.52
High jump	Élise Le Dieu de Ville (FRA)	1.79 m	Merve Menekşe (TUR)	1.76 m	Alkistis Vangeli (GRE)	1.76 m
Triple jump	Ilionis Guillaume (FRA)	13.37 m	Marina Lobato (ESP)	13.22 m	Victoria Josse (FRA)	12.77 m
Shot put	Amanda Ngandu-Ntumba (FRA)	14.68 m	Aysel Yılmaz (TUR)	14.07 m	Naomie Wuta (FRA)	12.89 m

== Medal table ==
* Host nation (France)

Rank	Nation	Gold	Silver	Bronze	Total
1	France*	6	6	8	20
2	Spain	4	2	2	8
3	Greece	3	0	1	4
4	Portugal	1	1	0	2
5	Algeria	1	0	1	2
5	Serbia	1	0	1	2
7	Turkey	0	4	0	4
8	Morocco	0	2	0	2
9	Croatia	0	1	1	2
10	Israel	0	0	1	1
10	Slovenia	0	0	1	1
Totals (11 entries)		16	16	16	48
