= Mediterranean Athletics U23 Indoor Championships =

Biennial indoor track and field competition

- Status: active
- Genre: indoor track and field championships
- Date: varying
- Frequency: biennial
- Country: varying
- Inaugurated: 2019
- Organiser: Mediterranean Athletics Union

The Mediterranean Athletics U23 Indoor Championships is a biennial indoor track and field competition open to athletes aged under 23 from Mediterranean nations. Organised by the Mediterranean Athletics Union, it was first held in 2019.

== Editions ==
| # | Year | City | Country | Date |
|---|---|---|---|---|
| 1 | 2019 | Miramas | France | 19 January 2019 |
| 2 | 2023 | Valencia | Spain | 22 January 2023 |
| 3 | 2025 | Istanbul | Turkey | Cancelled |

== Medals (2019-2023) ==
| Rank | Nation | Gold | Silver | Bronze | Total |
|---|---|---|---|---|---|
| 1 | France (FRA) | 10 | 12 | 13 | 35 |
| 2 | Spain (ESP) | 8 | 7 | 5 | 20 |
| 3 | Greece (GRE) | 5 | 0 | 1 | 6 |
| 4 | Croatia (CRO) | 3 | 2 | 1 | 6 |
| 5 | Italy (ITA) | 2 | 2 | 6 | 10 |
| 6 | Portugal (POR) | 1 | 1 | 0 | 2 |
| 7 | Algeria (ALG) | 1 | 0 | 1 | 2 |
| 7 | Serbia (SRB) | 1 | 0 | 1 | 2 |
| 9 | Turkey (TUR) | 0 | 4 | 1 | 5 |
| 10 | Morocco (MAR) | 0 | 2 | 0 | 2 |
| 11 | Bosnia and Herzegovina (BIH) | 0 | 1 | 0 | 1 |
| 12 | Israel (ISR) | 0 | 0 | 1 | 1 |
| 12 | Slovenia (SLO) | 0 | 0 | 1 | 1 |
| Totals (13 entries) | | 31 | 31 | 31 | 93 |

== Championship records ==
=== Men ===
| Event | Record | Athlete | Nationality | Date | Meet | Place | Ref |
|---|---|---|---|---|---|---|---|
| 60 m | 6.71 | William Aguessy | France | 22 January 2023 | 2023 Championships | Valencia, Spain | |
| 400 m | 46.99 | Markel Fernández | Spain | 22 January 2023 | 2023 Championships | Valencia, Spain | |
| 800 m | 1:50.12 | Pablo Sánchez-Valladares | Spain | 2019 | 2019 Championships | Miramas, France | |
| 1500 m | 3:46.34 | Adrián Ben | Spain | 2019 | 2019 Championships | Miramas, France | |
| 60 m hurdles | 7.90 | Just Kwaou-Mathey | France | 2019 | 2019 Championships | Miramas, France | |
| 60 m hurdles | 7.90 | Christos-Panagiotis Roumtsios | Greece | 22 January 2023 | 2023 Championships | Valencia, Spain | |
| High jump | 2.17 m | Edoardo Stronati | Italy | 22 January 2023 | 2023 Championships | Valencia, Spain | |
| Long jump | 7.99 m | Miltiadis Tentoglou | Greece | 2019 | 2019 Championships | Miramas, France | |
| Triple jump | 15.73 m | Thomas Martinez | France | 22 January 2023 | 2023 Championships | Valencia, Spain | |
| Shot put | 18.77 m | Miguel Gómez | Spain | 22 January 2023 | 2023 Championships | Valencia, Spain | |

=== Women ===
| Event | Record | Athlete | Nationality | Date | Meet | Place | Ref |
|---|---|---|---|---|---|---|---|
| 60 m | 7.37 | Polyniki Emmanouilidou | Greece | 22 January 2023 | 2023 Championships | Valencia, Spain | |
| 400 m | 54.16 | Veronika Drljacic | Croatia | 22 January 2023 | 2023 Championships | Valencia, Spain | |
| 800 m | 2:08.18 | Salome Afonso | Portugal | 2019 | 2019 Championships | Miramas, France | |
| 1500 m | 4:21.21 | Celia Anton | Spain | 2019 | 2019 Championships | Miramas, France | |
| 60 m hurdles | 8.16 | Paula Blanquer | Spain | 22 January 2023 | 2023 Championships | Valencia, Spain | |
| Pole vault | 4.35 m | Elina Giallurachis | France | 22 January 2023 | 2023 Championships | Valencia, Spain | |
| Long jump | 6.45 m | Larissa Iapichino | Italy | 22 January 2023 | 2023 Championships | Valencia, Spain | |
