= 2023 European Athletics Indoor Championships – Men's 800 metres =

Men's 800 metres at the 2023 European Athletics Indoor Championships
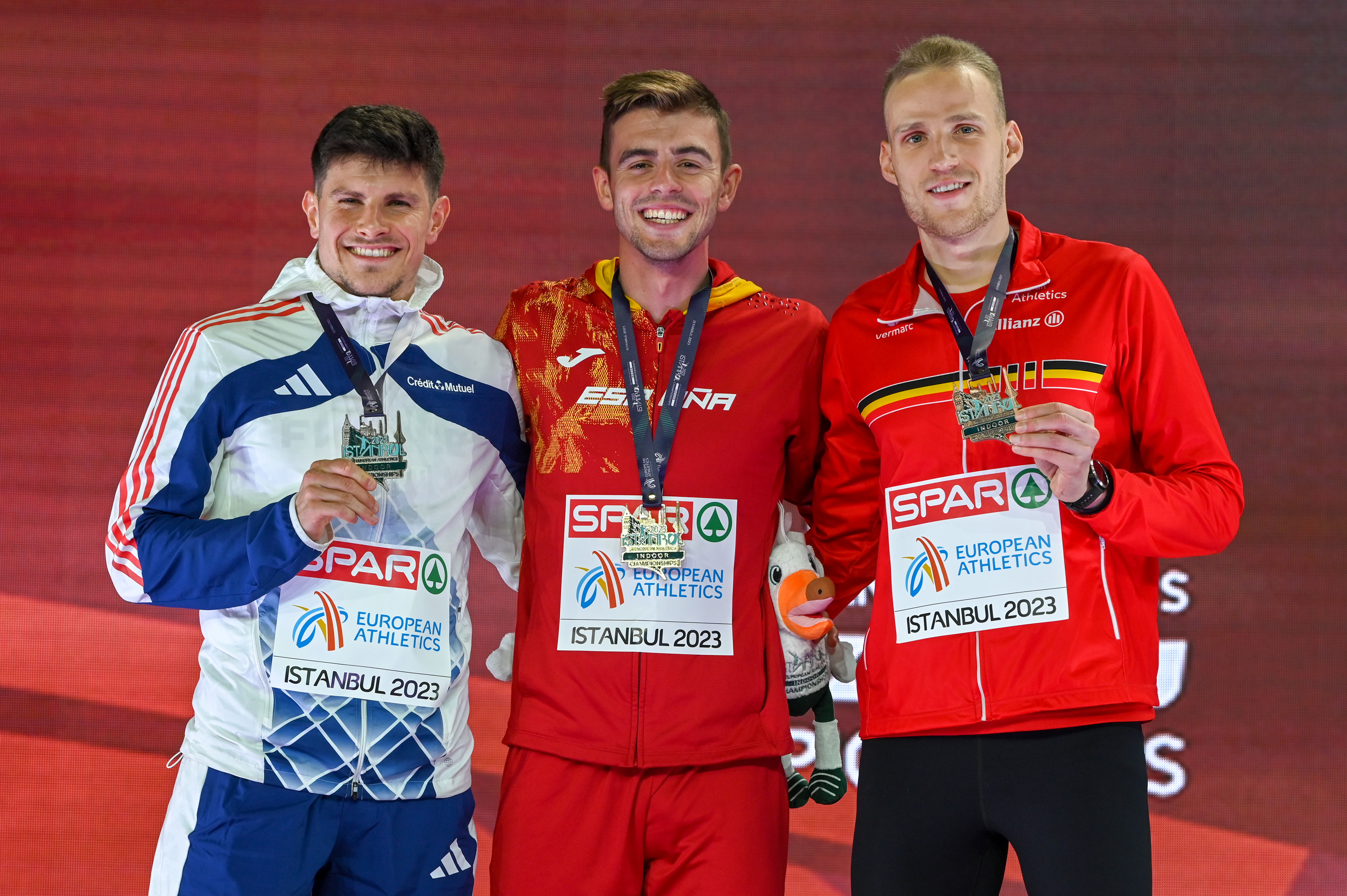
- The medalists.
- Venue: Ataköy Athletics Arena
- Location: Istanbul, Turkey
- Dates: 2 March 2023 (round 1); 4 March 2023 (semi-finals); 5 March 2023 (final)
- Competitors: 28 from 20 nations
- Winning time: 1:47.34

Medalists
gold medal	Adrián Ben	Spain
silver medal	Benjamin Robert	France
bronze medal	Eliott Crestan	Belgium

The men's 800 metres event at the 2023 European Athletics Indoor Championships was held on 2 March 2023 at 19:00 (heats), on 4 March at 19:35 (semi-finals), and on 5 March at 20:22 (final) local time.

== Records ==
Standing records prior to the 2023 European Athletics Indoor Championships
World record	Wilson Kipketer (DEN)	1:42.67	Paris, France	9 March 1997
European record	Wilson Kipketer (DEN)	1:42.67	Paris, France	9 March 1997
Championship record	Paweł Czapiewski (POL)	1:44.78	Vienna, Austria	3 March 2002
World Leading	Noah Kibet (KEN)	1:44.98	New York City, United States	11 February 2023
European Leading	Tibo De Smet (BEL)	1:45.04	Kirchberg, Luxembourg	22 January 2023

== Results ==
=== Heats ===
Qualification: First 2 in each heat (Q) and the next 2 fastest (q) advance to the Semifinals.

Rank	Heat	Athlete	Nationality	Time	Note
1	4	Amel Tuka	Bosnia and Herzegovina	1:47.22	Q
2	1	Catalin Tecuceanu	Italy	1:47.24	Q
3	1	Adrián Ben	Spain	1:47.32	Q
4	4	Javier Mirón	Spain	1:47.38	Q
5	4	Guy Learmonth	Great Britain	1:47.51	q
6	3	Eliott Crestan	Belgium	1:47.76	Q
7	4	Balázs Vindics	Hungary	1:47.82	q, SB
8	3	Andreas Kramer	Sweden	1:47.86	Q
9	5	Benjamin Robert	France	1:47.92	Q
10	5	Simone Barontini	Italy	1:47.94	Q
11	1	Bram Buigel	Netherlands	1:47.95	
12	1	Filip Šnejdr	Czech Republic	1:48.35	
13	5	Tibo De Smet	Belgium	1:48.43	
14	3	Tony van Diepen	Netherlands	1:48.50	
15	1	Abedin Mujezinović	Bosnia and Herzegovina	1:48.77	SB
16	3	John Fitzsimons	Ireland	1:49.36	
17	5	Marino Bloudek	Croatia	1:49.41	
18	4	Aurèle Vandeputte	Belgium	1:49.48	SB
19	2	Mateusz Borkowski	Poland	1:49.88	Q
19	4	Cristian Gabriel Voicu	Romania	1:49.88	
21	3	Jan Vuković	Slovenia	1:49.90	
22	2	Joonas Rinne	Finland	1:50.13	Q
23	1	Robin Oester	Switzerland	1:50.40	
24	2	José Carlos Pinto	Portugal	1:50.57	
25	3	Christos Kotitsas	Greece	1:50.82	
26	2	Saúl Ordóñez	Spain	1:51.72	
27	5	Ole Jakob Solbu	Norway	1:54.10	
	2	Mark English	Ireland	DNS	

=== Semifinals ===
Qualification: First 2 in each heat (Q) and the next 2 fastest (q) advance to the Final.

Rank	Heat	Athlete	Nationality	Time	Note
1	2	Adrián Ben	Spain	1:46.82	Q
2	2	Eliott Crestan	Belgium	1:46.84	Q, SB
3	1	Benjamin Robert	France	1:47.11	Q
4	2	Andreas Kramer	Sweden	1:47.11	Q
5	2	Simone Barontini	Italy	1:47.13	q
6	2	Guy Learmonth	Great Britain	1:47.50	q
7	1	Amel Tuka	Bosnia and Herzegovina	1:47.53	Q
8	1	Catalin Tecuceanu	Italy	1:47.53	Q
9	1	Mateusz Borkowski	Poland	1:47.55	
10	1	Javier Mirón	Spain	1:47.89	
11	2	Joonas Rinne	Finland	1:47.96	PB
12	1	Balázs Vindics	Hungary	1:48.16	

=== Final ===
Rank	Athlete	Nationality	Time	Note
1st place, gold medalist(s)	Adrián Ben	Spain	1:47.34	
2nd place, silver medalist(s)	Benjamin Robert	France	1:47.34	
3rd place, bronze medalist(s)	Eliott Crestan	Belgium	1:47.65	
4	Amel Tuka	Bosnia and Herzegovina	1:47.90	
5	Andreas Kramer	Sweden	1:48.15	
6	Guy Learmonth	Great Britain	1:48.46	
7	Catalin Tecuceanu	Italy	1:48.54	
8	Simone Barontini	Italy	1:48.63	
