= 2019 European Athletics U23 Championships – Men's 800 metres =

The men's 800 metres event at the 2019 European Athletics U23 Championships was held in Gävle, Sweden, at Gavlehov Stadium Park on 12 and 14 July.

== Medalists ==
Gold	Silver	Bronze
Mateusz Borkowski; Poland	Spencer Thomas; Great Britain	Pablo Sánchez-Valladares; Spain

== Results ==
=== Heats ===
Qualification: First 3 in each heat (Q) and next 2 fastest (q) qualified for the final.

Rank	Heat	Name	Nationality	Time	Notes
1	1	Simone Barontini	Italy	1:48.86	Q
2	1	Mateusz Borkowski	Poland	1:48.88	Q
3	1	Spencer Thomas	Great Britain	1:49.12	Q
4	1	Eduardo Romero	Spain	1:49.34	q
5	2	Pablo Sánchez-Valladares	Spain	1:49.49	Q
6	2	John Fitzsimons	Ireland	1:49.64	Q
7	2	Gabriel Tual	France	1:49.65	Q
8	2	Markus Einan	Norway	1:49.91	q
9	2	Gabriele Aquaro	Italy	1:49.99	
10	2	Andreas Kramer	Sweden	1:50.17	
11	1	Leonardo Cuzzolin	Italy	1:50.52	
12	1	Markus Teijula	Finland	1:50.53	
13	2	Benediktas Mickus	Lithuania	1:50.59	
14	1	José Carlos Pinto	Portugal	1:51.01	
15	1	Sven Cepus	Croatia	1:51.05	
16	2	Kevin Viezee	Netherlands	1:51.38	
17	2	Daniels Bambals	Latvia	1:52.89	

=== Final ===
Rank	Name	Nationality	Time	Notes
1st place, gold medalist(s)	Mateusz Borkowski	Poland	1:48.75	
2nd place, silver medalist(s)	Spencer Thomas	Great Britain	1:49.06	
3rd place, bronze medalist(s)	Pablo Sánchez-Valladares	Spain	1:49.36	
4	Eduardo Romero	Spain	1:49.39	
5	Gabriel Tual	France	1:49.43	
6	John Fitzsimons	Ireland	1:49.75	
7	Markus Einan	Norway	1:49.79	
8	Simone Barontini	Italy	1:49.91	
