= Javier Mirón =

Spanish middle-distance runner

Personal information
- Full name: Javier Mirón Caro
- Born: 13 December 1999 (age 26) Ibi, Spain

Sport
- Country: Spain
- Sport: Track and field
- Event: 800 m

Javier Mirón (born 13 December 1999) is a Spanish middle-distance runner.

== Personal life ==
He is from Ibi in the province of Alicante, Spain.

== Career ==
He won the 800m at the Gran Premio Diputacion IV Memorial Jose Antonio Cansino in Castellón-MGH in August 2020 in a time of 1:46.74. In September 2020 at the Spanish championship Mariano García won a close 800m in 1:47.55 from Miron who ran 1:47.76.

In May 2021, he lowered his 800 metres personal best to a time of 1:46.41 whilst running in Granada. On 9 June 2021, Miron ran 1:44.82 at a meeting in Marseille. This time placed him as the world leader of the year, the third fastest under-23 of all time, and sixth on the all time Spanish list. This time met the qualifying standard for the delayed 2020 Olympic Games, but with more Spanish athletes having the requirement than there were available places the allocation was to be decided at the Spanish Athletics Championships in Getafe. Unfortunately for Mirón he competed on the day with mysterious fatigue and later would test positive for the novel coronavirus COVID-19.

From June 2021 until the end of 2022, he differed a succession of injuries which kept him away from the track. At the start of 2023, he won bronze in the Spanish Indoor Athletics Championships, only 10 hundredths behind Saúl Ordóñez in first place. He competed in the 2023 European Athletics Indoor Championships in Istanbul, where he qualified for the semi-finals. However, a hamstring injury spoilt his preparation for the outdoor season and he placed sixth at the 2023 Spanish Championships.

In 2024, he made the decision to concentrate on 1500 metres races to try and obtain a place in the Spanish team for the Olympic Games. He competed in ten races in six weeks to try and establish a ranking at the distance. In June 2024, he finished as runner-up in the final of the 1500 metres at the 2024 Spanish Athletics Championships, won by Adel Mechaal, in a time of 3:36.15.

== Personal best ==
Outdoor

- 800 metres: 1:44.82 (Marseilles 2021)
- 1500 metres: 3:44.93 (Madrid 2020)

Indoor

- 800 metres: 1:45.98 (Madrid 2023)
- 1500 metres: 3:43.75 (Valencia 2023)

== Competition record ==
Year	Competition	Venue	Position	Event	Notes
Representing Spain
2015	European Youth Olympic Festival	Tbilisi, Georgia	3rd	800 m	1:54.92
2017	European U20 Championships	Grosseto, Italy	5th (h)	800 m	1:50.89
2023	European Indoor Championships	Istanbul, Turkey	10th (sf)	800 m	1:47.89
2024	Ibero-American Championships	Cuiabá, Brazil	5th	800 m	1:46.75
