= 2021 World Athletics Relays – Mixed shuttle hurdles relay =

Mixed shuttle hurdle relay at the 2021 World Athletics Relays
- Venue: Silesian Stadium
- Dates: 1 May 2021
- Nations: 4
- Winning time: 56.53

Medalists
gold medal	Monika Zapalska; Erik Balnuweit; Anne Weigold; Gregor Traber	Germany
silver medal	Zuzanna Hulisz; Krzysztof Kiljan; Klaudia Wojtunik; Damian Czykier	Poland
bronze medal	Priscilla Tabunda; Michael Musyoka Nzuku; Nusra Rukia; Wiseman Were Mukhobe	Kenya

The mixed shuttle hurdle relay at the 2021 World Athletics Relays was held at the Silesian Stadium on 1 May.

== Records ==
Prior to the competition, the records were as follows:

World record	Team Blue (Kristi Castlin, Spencer Adams, Nia Ali, Eddie Lovett)	54.42	Des Moines, United States	30 April 2016
Championship record	United States (Christina Clemons, Freddie Crittenden, Sharika Nelvis, Devon Allen)	54.96	Yokohama, Japan	11 May 2019

== Results ==
KEY:	WL	World leading	CR	Championship record	NR	National record	SB	Seasonal best

=== Final ===
Rank	Nation	Athletes	Time	Notes
1st place, gold medalist(s)	Germany	Monika Zapalska, Erik Balnuweit, Anne Weigold, Gregor Traber	56.53	SB
2nd place, silver medalist(s)	Poland	Zuzanna Hulisz, Krzysztof Kiljan, Klaudia Wojtunik, Damian Czykier	56.68	SB
3rd place, bronze medalist(s)	Kenya	Priscilla Tabunda, Michael Musyoka Nzuku, Nusra Rukia, Wiseman Were Mukhobe	59.89	SB
