= Pablo Sánchez-Valladares =

Spanish middle-distance runner

Personal information
- Full name: Pablo Sánchez-Valladares García
- Nationality: Spanish
- Born: 12 November 1997 (age 28) Torrejón de Ardoz, Spain

Sport
- Sport: Athletics
- Event: 800 m

Achievements and titles
- Personal bests: 500 m: 1:00.82 (Barcelona 2020) NB; 800 m: 1:45.19 (Castellón 2021); 1500 m: 3:44.17 (Andújar 2021)
Medal record
Athletics
Representing Spain
European U23 Championships
Bronze medal – third place	2019 Gävle	800 m
Mediterranean U23 Indoor Championships
Gold medal – first place	2019 Miramas	800 m

Pablo Sánchez-Valladares García (born 12 November 1997) is a Spanish middle-distance runner. He competed in the 800 metres at the 2020 Summer Olympics, where he was eliminated in round 1, running a time of 1:46.06.

== Competition record ==
Year	Competition	Venue	Position	Event	Notes
Representing Spain
2017	European U23 Championships	Bydgoszcz, Poland	8th	800 m	1:59.93
2018	Mediterranean U23 Championships	Jesolo, Italy	4th	800 m	1:51.18
2019	Mediterranean Indoor U23 Championships	Miramas, France	1st	800 m	1:50.12
2019	European Indoor Championships	Glasgow, United Kingdom	12th (h)	800 m	1:48.90
2019	European U23 Championships	Gävle, Sweden	3rd	800 m	1:49.36
2021	European Indoor Championships	Toruń, Poland	18th (sf)	800 m	2:05.11
2021	Olympic Games	Tokyo, Japan	4th (h)	800 m	1:46.06
2022	Ibero-American Championships	La Nucía, Spain	8th	800 m	1:49.94
2024	Ibero-American Championships	Cuiabá, Brazil	7th	800 m	1:50.79
2026	European Championships	Birmingham, United Kingdom	26th (h)	800 m	1:47.96
