= Simone Barontini =

Italian middle distance runner

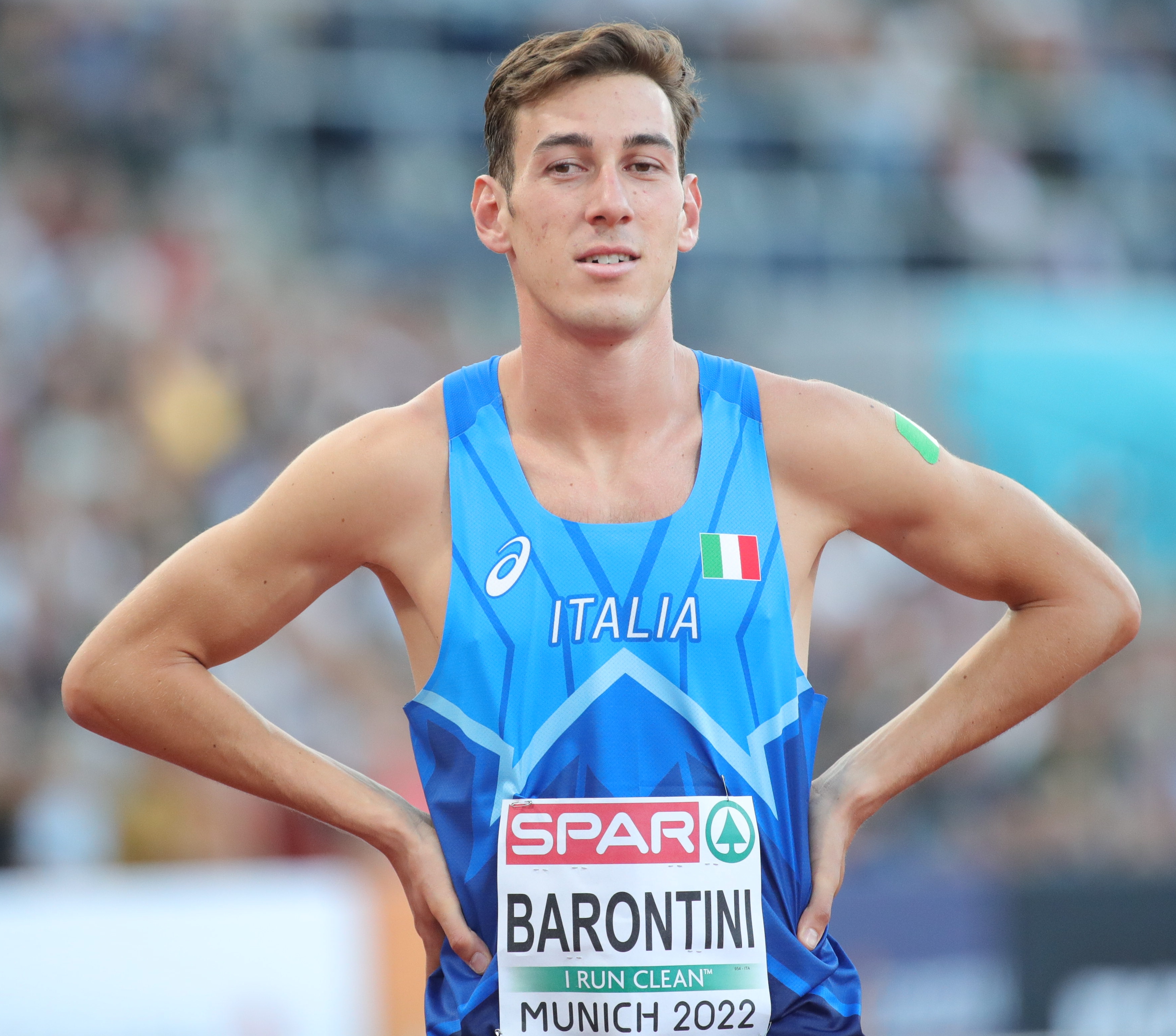
- Barontini at Munich 2022

Personal information
- National team: Italy: 2 caps (2018-2019)
- Born: 5 January 1999 (age 27) Ancona, Italy
- Height: 1.87 m (6 ft 2 in)
- Weight: 74 kg (163 lb)

Sport
- Sport: Athletics
- Event: 800 metres
- Club: G.S. Fiamme Azzurre; S.E.F. Stamura Ancona
- Coached by: Fabrizio Dubbini

Achievements and titles
- Personal bests: 800 m: 1:44.50 (2023); 800 m (indoor): 1:46.82 (2023)
Medal record
European U18 Championships
Bronze medal – third place	2016 Tbilisi	800 metres
European U23 Championships
Gold medal – first place	2021 Tallinn	800 metres

Simone Barontini (born 5 January 1999) is an Italian middle distance runner, who specializes in the 800 metres. He has won seven national titles at the senior level.

== Biography ==
He participated at one edition of the European Athletics Championships in 2018, and one of the European Athletics Indoor Championships in 2019. He finished eighth at the 2019 European U23 Championships. He gained gold at the 2021 European U23 Championships in Tallinn.

== Achievements ==
Year	Competition	Venue	Rank	Event	Time	Notes
2022	European Championships	(Germany) Munich	7th	800 m	1:45.66	PB
2023	European Indoor Championships	(Turkey) Istanbul	8th	800 m	1:48.63	(Note: He ran a better crono 1:47.13 in semifinals)

== National titles ==
Barontini won nine national championships at individual senior level.

- Italian Athletics Championships
  - 800 metres: 2019, 2020, 2021, 2023 (4)
- Italian Athletics Indoor Championships
  - 800 metres: 2017, 2018, 2019, 2020, 2021 (5)
