= Krzysztof Kiljan =

Polish athlete (born 1999)

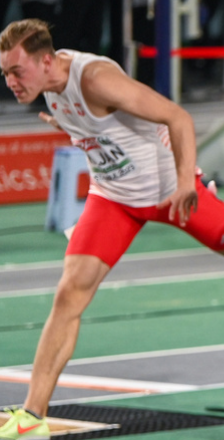
- Kiljan in 2023

Personal information
- Nationality: Polish
- Born: 30 December 1999 (age 26)

Sport
- Sport: Athletics
- Event: Hurdles

Achievements and titles
- Personal bests: 60m hurdles: 7.59 (2024); 110m hurdles: 13.43 (2023)
Medal record
Men's athletics
Representing Poland
World Relays
| Silver medal – second place | 2021 Chorzów | Shuttle Hurdle Relay |
Summer World University Games
| Bronze medal – third place | 2021 Chengdu | 110 m hurdles |

Krzysztof Kiljan (born 30 December 1999) is a Polish hurdler. He competed at the 2023, 2024, and 2025 World Athletics Indoor Championships over 60 metres hurdles, and the 2024 Olympic Games over 110 metres hurdles.

== Career ==
He won a bronze medal at the delayed 2021 Summer World University Games in Chengdu, India in the 100 metres hurdles. In March 2023, he finished sixth in the 60 metres hurdles at the 2023 World Athletics Indoor Championships in Istanbul. That summer, he lowered his 110 m hurdles personal best to 13.43 seconds.

He reached the semi finals in the 60 metres hurdles at the 2024 World Athletics Indoor Championships in Glasgow. He competed at the 2024 European Athletics Championships in Rome, reaching the semi-finals with a run of 13.78 seconds. Later that month he finished third at the Polish Athletics Championships. In July 2024, he qualified by ranking for the 2024 Olympics Games. He subsequently competed in the 110 m hurdles at the 2024 Paris Olympics without reaching the semi-final.

He was selected for the 2025 World Athletics Indoor Championships in Nanjing, China in March 2025. He qualified for the semi-finals with a time of 7.71 seconds. In his semi-final he ran 7.68 seconds, but did not progress through to the final.

== Personal life ==
He is from Białystok, Poland. In 2023, it was reported he was in a relationship with fellow athlete Ewa Swoboda with the pair having first met in 2021. They have since appeared together and danced together at public events. He is a member of Sports Club AZS-AWF in Warsaw.
