= Felix Straub =

German bobsledder (born 1997)

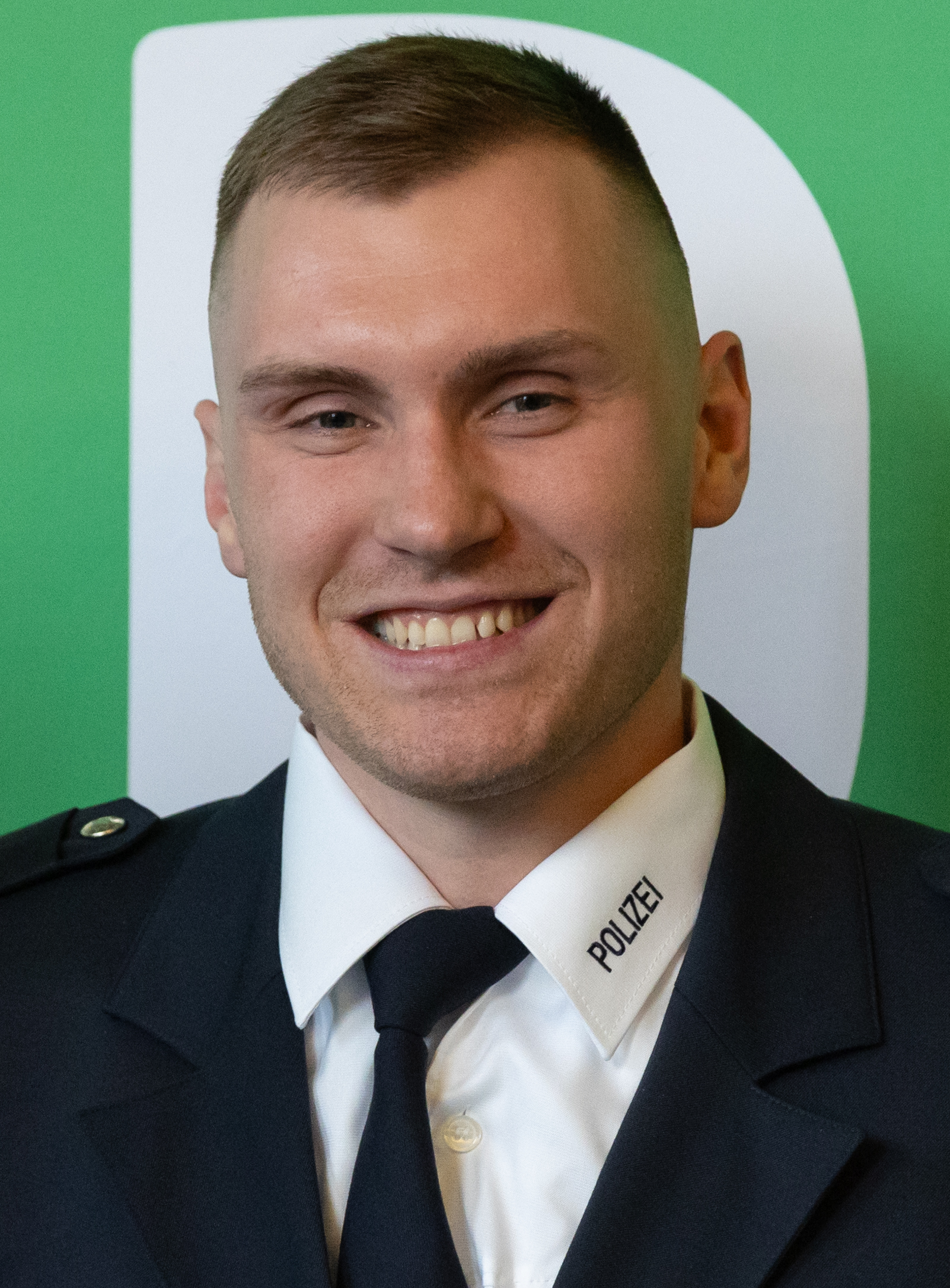
- Straub in 2025

Personal information
- Born: 14 May 1997 (age 29)
- Height: 1.83 m (6 ft 0 in)
- Weight: 94 kg (207 lb)

Sport
- Country: Germany
- Sport: Bobsleigh
- Event: Four-man
- Coached by: René Spies
Medal record
Men's bobsleigh
Representing Germany
Olympic Games
Silver medal – second place	2026 Milano Cortina	Four-man
World Championships
Gold medal – first place	2024 Winterberg	Four-man
Gold medal – first place	2025 Lake Placid	Four-man
European Championships
Gold medal – first place	2024 Sigulda	Four-man
Silver medal – second place	2023 Altenberg	Four-man
Silver medal – second place	2025 Lillehammer	Four-man

Felix Straub (born 14 May 1997) is a German bobsledder and sprinter. He represented Germany at the 2026 Winter Olympics.

== Career ==
Straub began his athletics career as a sprinter before transitioning to bobsleigh. He competed at the 2021 World Athletics Relays and won a gold medal in the 4 × 200 metres relay.

In January 2023, he competed at the IBSF European Championships 2023 and won a silver medal in the four-man event. In December 2023, he again competed at the IBSF European Championships 2024 and won a gold medal in the four-man event.

In March 2024, he represented Germany at the IBSF World Championships 2024 and won a gold medal in the four-man event.

In February 2025, he competed at the IBSF European Championships 2025 and won a silver medal in the four-man event, finishing 0.05 seconds behind the gold medal winners. The next month, he competed at the IBSF World Championships 2025 and won a gold medal in the four-man event.

He represented Germany at the 2026 Winter Olympics and won a silver medal in the four-man event with a time of 3:38.14.

== World Championships results ==
Event	Two-man	Four-man
(Germany) 2024 Winterberg	—N/a	1st
(United States) 2025 Lake Placid	—N/a	1st
