= Frederico Curvelo =

Portuguese sprinter (born 1997)

Frederico Curvelo (born 11 July 1997) is a Portuguese sprinter who specializes in the 100 and 200 metres.

== Individual ==
He hails from Lousã. He studied physiotherapy in Leiria. Curvelo finished second at the 2018 Mediterranean U23 Championships (100 m). He also competed at the 2019 European U23 Championships (100 m and 200 m) without reaching the final.

He became Portuguese 200 metres champion in 2018 (indoor) and 2020, as well as Portuguese 60 metres champion in 2019.

His personal best times are 10.18 in the 100 metres, achieved in June 2022 in Lisbon; and 21.21 seconds in the 200 metres, achieved in April 2021 in Lisbon.

== Relay ==
In the 4 × 100 metres relay, Curvelo finished eighth at the 2018 European Championships and fourth at the 2024 Ibero-American Championships. He also competed in this event at the 2015 European Junior Championships, the 2016 World U20 Championships, the 2019 European U23 Championships and the 2021 World Athletics Relays without reaching the final. In the rarely contested 4 × 200 metres relay, he finished third at the 2021 World Athletics Relays.
