= Benjamin Robert =

French runner

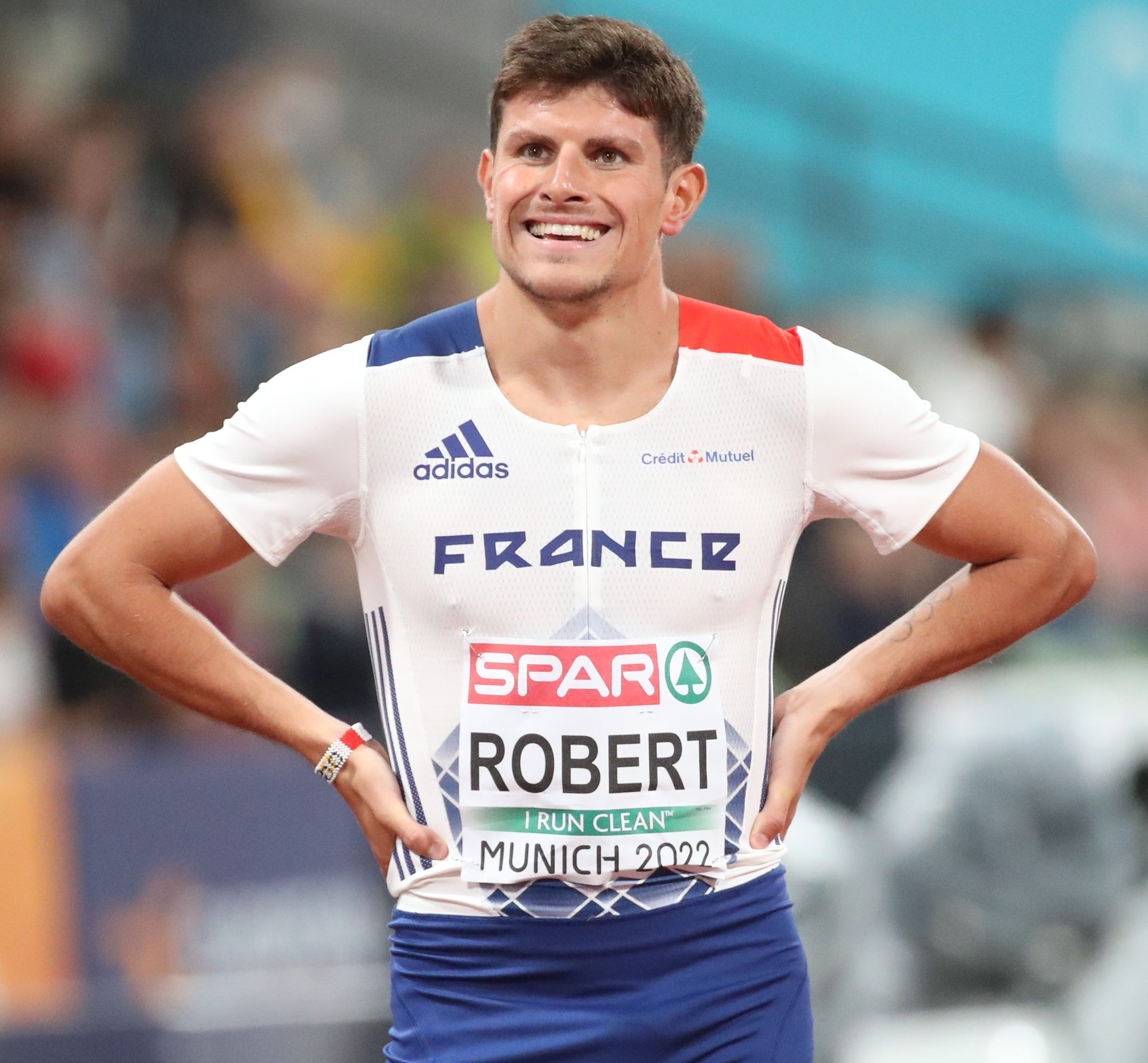
- Robert in 2022

Personal information
- Born: 4 January 1998 (age 28) Toulouse, France
- Height: 1.73 m (5 ft 8 in)
- Weight: 65 kg (143 lb)

Sport
- Sport: Athletics
- Event: 800 metres
- Club: Sa Toulouse Uc
- Coached by: Sébastien Gamel
Medal record
Men's Athletics
Representing France
European Indoor Championships
Silver medal – second place	2023 Istanbul	800 m

Benjamin Robert (born 4 January 1998) is a French middle-distance runner specialising in the 800 metres. He won the silver medal at the 2023 European Indoor Championships.

Robert took six French national titles (800 m indoors and out).

== Statistics ==
=== International competitions ===
Representing France
Year	Competition	Venue	Position	Event	Time
2017	European U20 Championships	Grosseto, Italy	6th	800 m	1:49.82
2018	Mediterranean U23 Championships	Jesolo, Italy	3rd	800 m	1:50.89
2019	Mediterranean U23 Championships	Miramas, France	3rd	800 m	1:50.25
2021	European Indoor Championships	Toruń, Poland	5th (sf)	800 m	1:48.25
2021	Olympic Games	Tokyo, Japan	35th (h)	800 m	1:47.12
2022	World Championships	Eugene, OR, United States	9th (sf)	800 m	1:45.67
2022	European Championships	Munich, Germany	5th	800 m	1:45.42
2023	European Indoor Championships	Istanbul, Turkey	2nd	800 m	1:47.34
2023	World Championships	Budapest, Hungary	12th (sf)	800 m	1:44.38
2024	World Indoor Championships	Glasgow, United Kingdom	3rd (sf)	800 m	1:45.28^{1}
2024	Olympic Games	Paris, France	16th (rep)	800 m	1:45.83

^{1}Disqualified in the final

=== Personal bests ===
- 400 metres – 47.94 (Toulouse 2017)
  - 400 metres indoor – 48.53 (Aubiére 2018)
- 800 metres – 1:43.48 (Paris 2023)
  - 800 metres indoor – 1:46.06 (Miramas 2021)
- 1000 metres – 2:17.11 (Monaco 2022)
  - 1000 metres indoor – 2:19.59 (Val-de-Reuil 2022)
- 1500 metres – 3:50.97 (Toulouse 2018)
  - 1500 metres indoor – 3:44.72 (Miramas 2022)

=== National titles ===
- French Athletics Championships
  - 800 metres: 2020, 2021, 2022
- French Indoor Athletics Championships
  - 800 metres: 2021, 2022, 2023
