= Luis Puig Palace =

Arena in Valencia, Spain

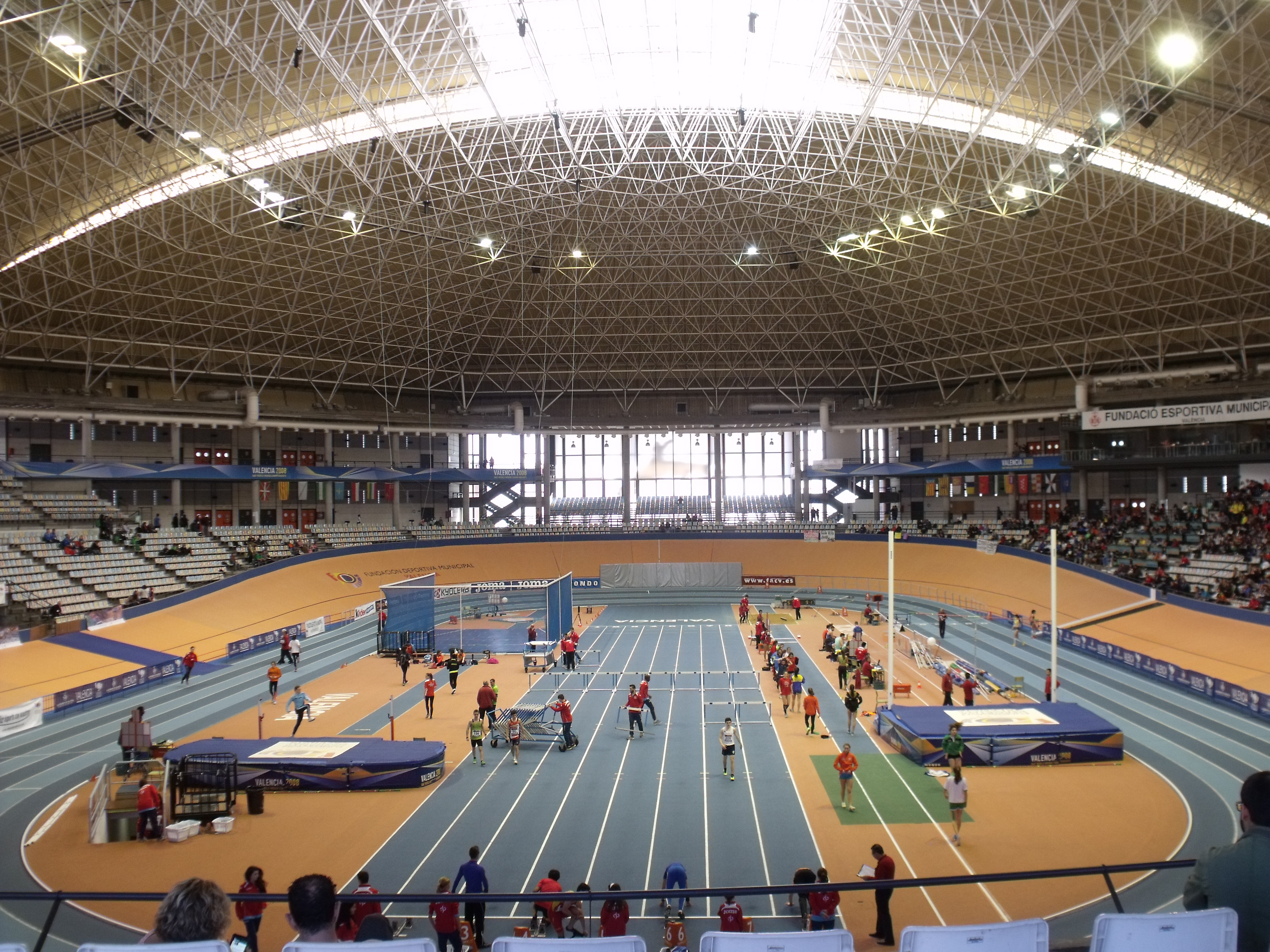
- Interior of the velodrome
- Interactive map of Luis Puig Palace
- Full name: Palau Velòdrom Lluís Puig
- Location: Valencia, Spain
- Coordinates: 39°30′2.3″N 0°25′38.4″W
- Capacity: 6,500
- Surface: Concrete
- Field size: 250 m (270 yd) track

Construction
- Opened: 1992

Luis Puig Palace (Valencian: Palau Velòdrom Lluís Puig, Spanish: Palacio Velódromo Luis Puig) is an arena in Valencia, Spain. It is primarily used for indoor sports and hosted the 2008 IAAF World Indoor Championships. The arena also hosts a 250 metres (270 yd) painted concrete cycling track which played host to the 1992 UCI Track Cycling World Championships. It has a capacity of 6,500 people. The arena is named after Luis Puig, a prominent Spanish sports executive who served as President of the Union Cycliste Internationale.

== See also ==
- List of cycling tracks and velodromes

Events and tenants
Preceded by Hanns-Martin-Schleyer-Halle; Stuttgart	UCI Track Cycling World Championships; Venue; 1992	Succeeded by Vikingskipet Olympic Arena; Hamar
Preceded by Globen Arena; Stockholm	European Indoor Championships in Athletics; Venue; 1998	Succeeded by Flanders Sports Arena; Ghent
Preceded by C.D. Jamor; Lisbon	European Swimming Championships (SC); Venue; 2000	Succeeded by Wezenberg; Antwerp
Preceded by Olimpiysky; Moscow	IAAF World Indoor Championships in Athletics; Venue; 2008	Succeeded by ASPIRE Dome; Doha
