= Luis Puig =

Spanish cycling administrator

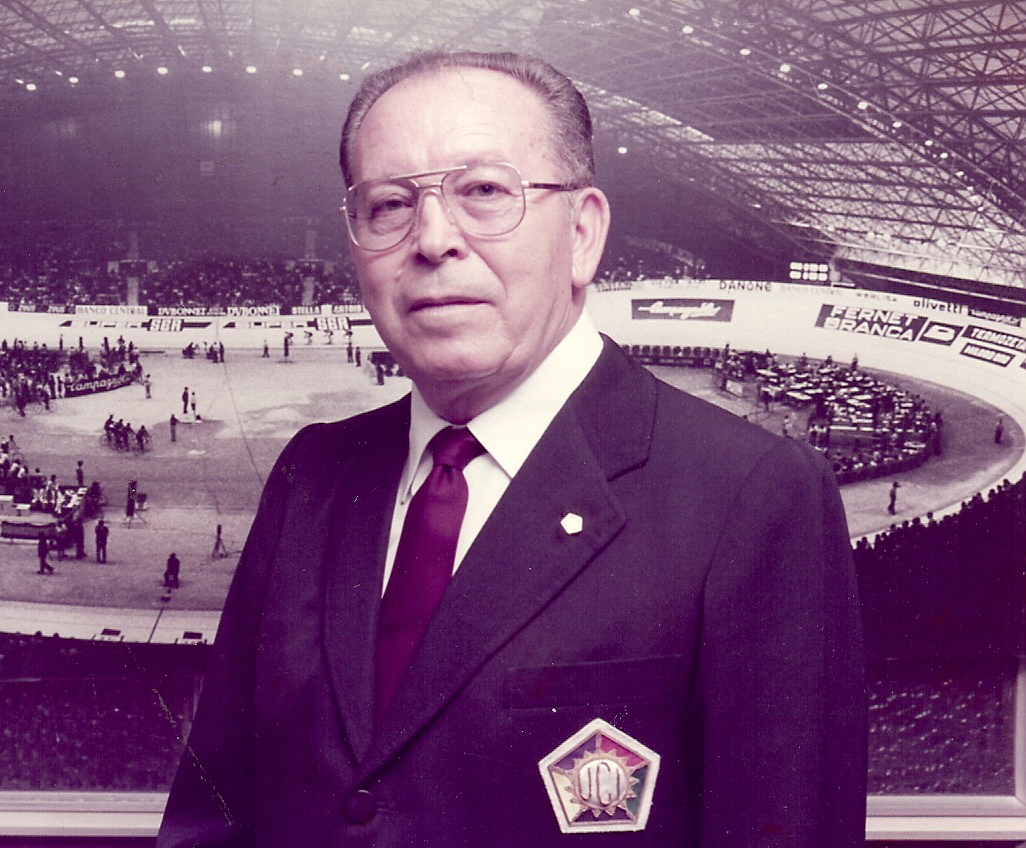

President of the Union Cycliste Internationale
- In office 1981–1990
- Preceded by: Adriano Rodoni
- Succeeded by: Hein Verbruggen

Personal details
- Born: 9 April 1915 L'Alcúdia, Spain
- Died: 31 July 1990 (aged 75) Valencia, Spain

Luis Puig Esteve (9 April 1915 – 31 July 1990) was a prominent Spanish sports executive known for his contributions to sports administration in the 20th century.

== Biography ==
Luis Puig Esteve was born on 9 April 1915, in L'Alcúdia, Spain. He died on 31 July 1990, in Valencia.

== Career ==
Luis Puig held significant leadership positions in various sports organizations throughout his career:

=== International Cycling Union (UCI) ===
Luis Puig served as the President of the International Cycling Union (UCI) from 1981 until his death in 1990. His tenure saw important developments in international cycling competitions and governance.

=== Spanish Olympic Committee (COE) ===
He was an active member of the Spanish Olympic Committee (COE), contributing to the shaping of Spanish sports policies and initiatives.

=== Spanish Cycling Federation (RFEC) ===
From 1968 to 1984, Puig Esteve held the position of President of the Royal Spanish Cycling Federation (RFEC). His leadership during this time was instrumental in the growth and advancement of cycling in Spain.

== Legacy ==
Luis Puig Esteve's impact on the sports community, particularly in cycling and sports administration, remains influential. His dedication and accomplishments have left a lasting legacy in Spanish and international sports history. Luis Puig Palace is a cycling arena named after Puig. It hosted 1992 UCI Track Cycling World Championships and 2008 IAAF World Indoor Championships.

The single-day road bicycle race Trofeo Luis Puig is also named after him.
