= List of presidents of the UCI =

The following is a list of presidents of Union Cycliste Internationale (UCI), the world cycling governing body.

No.	Image	Name	Nationality	Term
1		Emile De Beukelaer	Belgium	1900–1922
2		Léon Breton	France	1922–1936
3		Max Burgi	Switzerland	1936–1939
4		Alban Collignon	Belgium	1939–1947
5		Achille Joinard	France	1947–1958
6		Adriano Rodoni	Italy	1958–1981
7		Luis Puig	Spain	1981–1990
8		Hein Verbruggen	Netherlands	1991–2005
9		Pat McQuaid	Ireland	2005–2013
10		Brian Cookson	United Kingdom	2013–2017
11		David Lappartient	France	2017–
