= Simon Hansen (athlete) =

Danish sprinter (born 1998)

Simon Hansen OLY
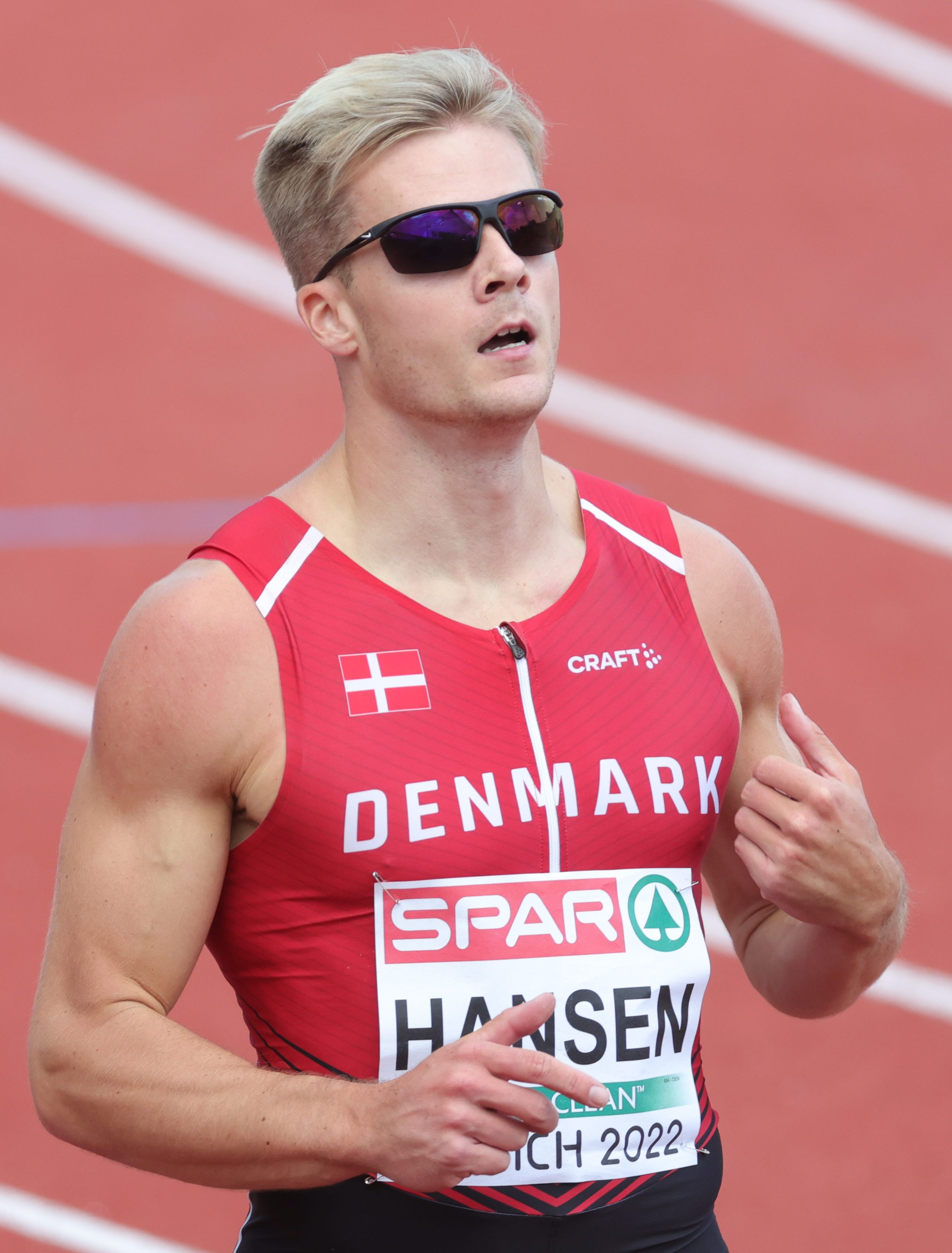
- Hansen in 2022

Personal information
- Nationality: Danish
- Born: 30 June 1998 (age 28)

Sport
- Sport: Athletics
- Event: 100 metres
- University team: Maryland Terrapins

Simon Hansen (born 30 June 1998) is a Danish athlete. He competed in the men's 4 × 100 metres relay event at the 2020 Summer Olympics.

He competed at the collegiate level at the University of Maryland.

== International championships results ==
Representing Denmark
Year	Competition	Venue	Position	Event	Time	Wind (m/s)
2015	World U18 Championships	Cali, Colombia	14th (sf)	100 m	10.65	
2015	World U18 Championships	Cali, Colombia	11th (sf)	200 m	21.37	
2019	European U23 Championships	Gävle, Sweden	25th (h)	200 m	21.47	
2019	European U23 Championships	Gävle, Sweden	9th (h)	4 × 100 m	40.22	
