= Delvis Santos =

Portuguese sprinter (born 1999)

Personal information
- Full name: Delvis Canda dos Santos
- Born: 27 June 1999 (age 27)

Sport
- Sport: Athletics
- Event: Sprint
- Club: Sporting CP
Medal record
Men's athletics
Representing Portugal
Athletics
World Athletics Relays
Bronze medal – third place	2021 Silesia	4×200 metres relay

Delvis Canda dos Santos (born 27 June 1999) is a Portuguese sprinter. He is a multiple-time national champion and was a finalist in the 200 metres at the 2026 European Athletics Championships.

== Biography ==
Santos won a bronze medal at the 2021 World Athletics Relays in Silesia in the 4×200 metres relay. In March 2025, he was eliminated in the first round of the 60 metres at the 2025 European Athletics Indoor Championships in Apeldoorn, Netherlands, running a time of 6.77 seconds. He was part of the Portugal mixed 4 x 100 metres team that set a national record 40.76 seconds at the 2026 World Athletics Relays in Gaborone, Botswana.

A member of Sporting CP, and coached by Adam Ferreira, Santos equalled his personal best of 20.45 seconds for the 200 metres in 2026 and was included in the Portuguese squad to compete at the 2026 European Athletics Championships in Birmingham, England. Santos ran a personal best 20.23 seconds to qualify for the final of the 200 metres as a fastest non-automatic qualifier having placed third in his semi-final. He placed sixth in the final with a wind-assisted 20.55 seconds (+2.5). He also qualified for the semi-finals of the 100 metres earlier in the championships but had to withdraw for medical reasons. He also ran in the men's 4 x 100 metres relay at the championships.
