= 2021 World Athletics Relays – Women's 4 × 100 metres relay =

Women's 4 × 100 metres relay at the 2021 World Athletics Relays
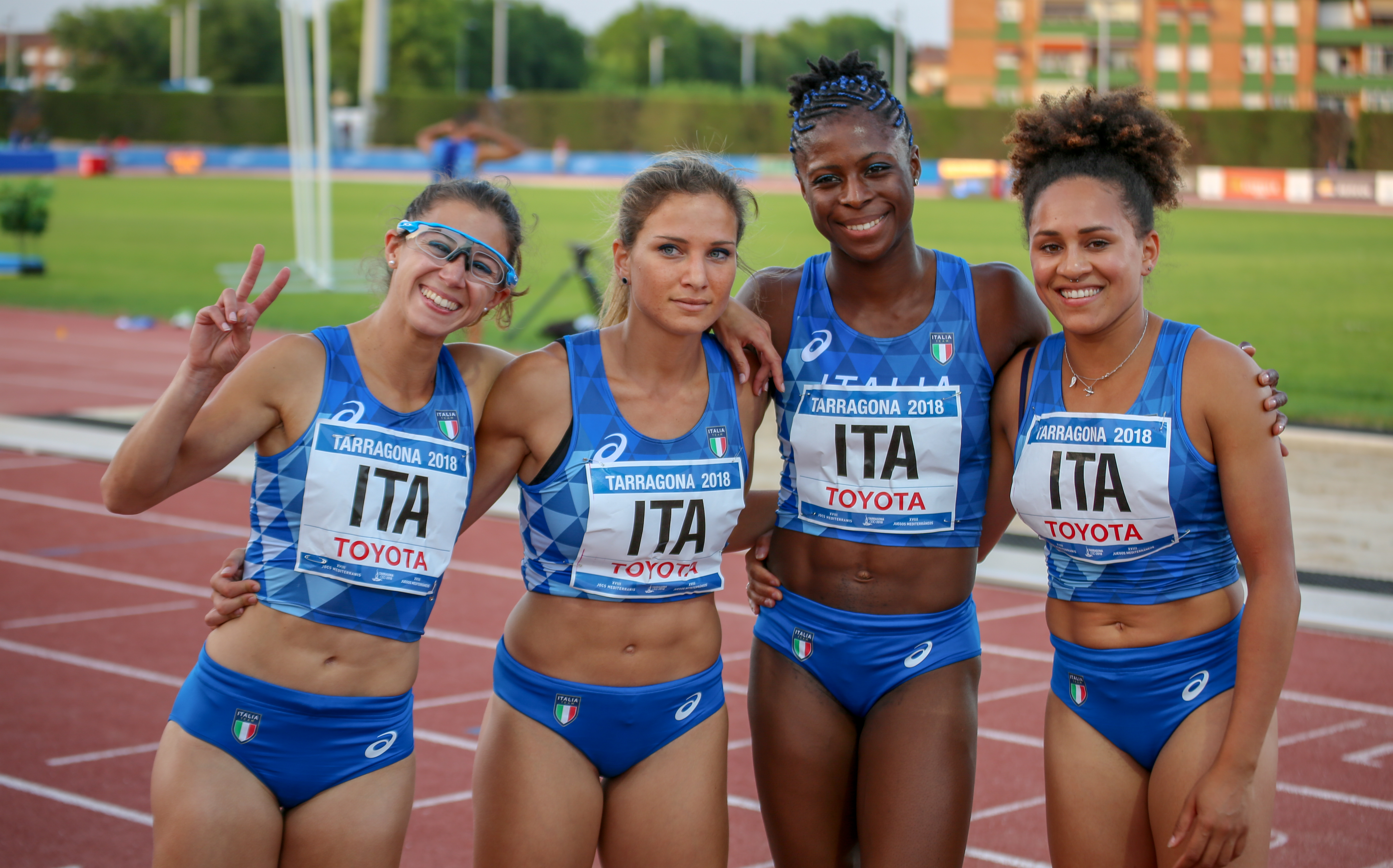
- From left Siragusa, Bongiorni, Hooper, Herrera the Italian national track relay team who ran in heats.
- Venue: Silesian Stadium, Chorzów
- Dates: 1 May (heats) & 2 May (final)
- Nations: 14
- Winning time: 43.79

Medalists
gold medal	Irene Siragusa; Gloria Hooper; Anna Bongiorni; Vittoria Fontana; Johanelis Herrera (ran the heat)	Italy
silver medal	Magdalena Stefanowicz; Klaudia Adamek; Katarzyna Sokólska; Pia Skrzyszowska; Paulina Guzowska (ran the heat)	Poland
bronze medal	Jamile Samuel; Dafne Schippers; Nadine Visser; Naomi Sedney; Marije van Hunenstijn (ran the heat)	Netherlands

The women's 4 × 100 metres relay at the 2021 World Athletics Relays was held at the Silesian Stadium on 1 and 2 May.

== Records ==
Prior to the competition, the records were as follows:

World record	United States(Tianna Madison, Allyson Felix, Bianca Knight, Carmelita Jeter)	40.82	(United Kingdom) London, Great Britain	10 August 2012
Championship record	United States(Tianna Bartoletta, Alexandria Anderson, Jeneba Tarmoh, LaKeisha Lawson)	41.88	(The Bahamas) Nassau, Bahamas	24 May 2014
World Leading	Star Athletics Louisiana State University	42.70	Prairie View, United States Baton Rouge, United States	3 April 2021 24 April 2021

== Results ==
=== Heats ===
Qualification: First 2 of each heat (Q) plus the 2 fastest times (q) advanced to the final.

- Q Qualified
- q Qualified as fastest times
- WL = World leading
- NR = National record
- SB = Seasonal best
- OG* = 2020 Olympic Games qualification
- WC* = 2022 World Championships qualification

Rank	Heat	Country	Athletes	Time	Notes
1	2	Netherlands	Jamile Samuel, Dafne Schippers, Nadine Visser, Marije Van Hunenstijn	43.28	SB, *OG, *WC
2	3	France	Orlann Ombissa-Dzangue, Cynthia Leduc, Maroussia Paré, Sarah Richard-Mingas	43.51	SB, *OG, *WC
3	2	Poland	Paulina Guzowska, Klaudia Adamek, Katarzyna Sokólska, Pia Skrzyszowska	43.64	SB, *OG, *WC
4	3	Switzerland	Riccarda Dietsche, Salomé Kora, Cornelia Halbheer, Cynthia Reinle	43.71	SB, *WC
5	2	Ecuador	Ángela Tenorio, Anahí Suárez, Virginia Villalba, Marizol Landázuri	43.86	NR, *OG, *WC
6	1	Italy	Johanelis Herrera Abreu, Gloria Hooper, Anna Bongiorni, Irene Siragusa	44.02	SB, *WC
7	1	Japan	Hanae Aoyama, Mei Kodama, Ami Saito, Remi Tsuruta	44.17	SB, *OG, *WC
8	3	Denmark	Mathilde Kramer, Astrid Glenner-Frandsen, Mette Graversgaard, Ida Karstoft	44.25	SB, *OG, *WC
9	3	Spain	Maria Isabel Pérez, Estela García, Paula Sevilla, Cristina Lara	44.38	SB, *WC
10	2	Ireland	Molly Scott, Sarah Lavin, Kate Doherty, Sarah Quinn	44.53	SB, *WC
11	2	Zambia	Suwilanji Theresa Mpondela, Lumeka Katundu, Hellen Makumba, Roda Njobvu	44.81	SB
12	1	Ghana	Gemma Acheampong, Latifa Ali, Janet Amponsah, Halutie Hor	44.85	SB
13	1	Czech Republic	Johana Kaiserová, Martina Hofmanová, Jana Slaninová, Barbora Šplechtnová	45.48	SB
	1	Brazil	Ana Cláudia Lemos, Vitória Cristina Rosa, Ana Azevedo, Rosângela Santos	DSQ	

=== Final ===
Rank	Lane	Nation	Athletes	Time	Notes
1st place, gold medalist(s)	6	Italy	Irene Siragusa, Gloria Hooper, Anna Bongiorni, Vittoria Fontana	43.79	SB
2nd place, silver medalist(s)	5	Poland	Magdalena Stefanowicz, Klaudia Adamek, Katarzyna Sokólska, Pia Skrzyszowska	44.10	
3rd place, bronze medalist(s)	4	Netherlands	Jamile Samuel, Dafne Schippers, Nadine Visser, Naomi Sedney	44.10	
4	9	Japan	Hanae Aoyama, Mei Kodama, Ami Saito, Remi Tsuruta	44.40	
5	2	Ecuador	Ángela Tenorio, Anahí Suárez, Yuliana Angulo, Marizol Landázuri	44.43	
6	3	Denmark	Mathilde Kramer, Astrid Glenner-Frandsen, Mette Graversgaard, Emma Beiter Bomme	45.34	
	7	France	Wided Atatou, Cynthia Leduc, Maroussia Paré, Sarah Richard Mingas	DNF	
	8	Switzerland	Riccarda Dietsche, Salomé Kora, Cornelia Halbheer, Cynthia Reinle	DQ	R24.7
