= 2021 European Athletics Indoor Championships – Women's 60 metres =

Women's 60 metres at the 2021 European Athletics Indoor Championships
- Venue: Arena Toruń
- Location: Toruń, Poland
- Dates: 7 March 2021
- Competitors: 40 from 25 nations
- Winning time: 7.03 WL, =NR

Medalists
| gold medal | Ajla Del Ponte | Switzerland |
| silver medal | Lotta Kemppinen | Finland |
| bronze medal | Jamile Samuel | Netherlands |

The women's 60 metres event at the 2021 European Athletics Indoor Championships was held on 7 March 2021 at 10:18 (heats), at 12:40 (semi-finals), and at 18:46 (final) local time.

== Records ==
Standing records prior to the 2019 European Athletics Indoor Championships
| World record | Irina Privalova (RUS) | 6.92 | Madrid, Spain | 11 February 1993 |
| European record | Irina Privalova (RUS) | 6.92 | Madrid, Spain | 9 February 1995 |
| Championship record | Nelli Cooman (NED) | 7.00 | Madrid, Spain | 23 February 1986 |
| World Leading | Dina Asher-Smith (GBR) | 7.08 | Karlsruhe, Germany | 29 January 2021 |
| World Leading | Javianne Oliver (USA) | 7.08 | Toruń, Poland | 17 February 2021 |
| European Leading | Dina Asher-Smith (GBR) | 7.08 | Karlsruhe, Germany | 29 January 2021 |

== Results ==
=== Heats ===
Qualification: First 4 in each heat (Q) and the next fastest 4 (q) advance to the Semifinals.

| Rank | Heat | Athlete | Nationality | Time | Note |
|---|---|---|---|---|---|
| 1 | 2 | Carolle Zahi | France | 7.22 | Q |
| 2 | 3 | Lotta Kemppinen | Finland | 7.25 | Q |
| 3 | 3 | Jennifer Montag | Germany | 7.25 | Q |
| 4 | 4 | Ajla Del Ponte | Switzerland | 7.26 | Q |
| 5 | 2 | Naomi Sedney | Netherlands | 7.27 | Q, SB |
| 6 | 5 | Jamile Samuel | Netherlands | 7.27 | Q, =SB |
| 7 | 5 | Claudia Payton | Sweden | 7.28 | Q, PB |
| 8 | 1 | Amelie-Sophie Lederer | Germany | 7.30 | Q |
| 9 | 3 | Rani Rosius | Belgium | 7.30 | Q |
| 10 | 5 | Orlann Ombissa-Dzangue | France | 7.30 | Q |
| 11 | 5 | Maja Mihalinec | Slovenia | 7.31 | Q |
| 12 | 1 | Viktoriya Ratnikova | Ukraine | 7.31 | Q |
| 13 | 1 | Salomé Kora | Switzerland | 7.32 | Q |
| 14 | 5 | Marina Andreea Baboi | Romania | 7.32 | q |
| 15 | 4 | Rafaéla Spanoudaki-Hatziriga | Greece | 7.33 | Q |
| 16 | 3 | Riccarda Dietsche | Switzerland | 7.33 | Q |
| 17 | 5 | Marcela Pírková | Czech Republic | 7.34 | q, =PB |
| 18 | 5 | Vittoria Fontana | Italy | 7.34 | q, PB |
| 19 | 4 | Inna Eftimova | Bulgaria | 7.36 | Q |
| 20 | 3 | Astrid Glenner-Frandsen | Denmark | 7.36 | q |
| 21 | 3 | Irene Siragusa | Italy | 7.37 | |
| 22 | 2 | Monika Weigertová | Slovakia | 7.37 | Q |
| 22 | 1 | Ciara Neville | Ireland | 7.37 | Q |
| 22 | 3 | Molly Scott | Ireland | 7.37 | |
| 25 | 4 | Rosalina Santos | Portugal | 7.38 | Q |
| 26 | 1 | María Isabel Pérez | Spain | 7.39 | |
| 27 | 1 | Maria Gatou | Greece | 7.40 | |
| 28 | 1 | Lorène Bazolo | Portugal | 7.40 | |
| 29 | 2 | Magdalena Lindner | Austria | 7.40 | Q |
| 30 | 4 | Milana Tirnanić | Serbia | 7.42 | |
| 31 | 4 | Olivia Fotopoulou | Cyprus | 7.43 | |
| 32 | 4 | Paula Sevilla | Spain | 7.44 | |
| 33 | 2 | Katarzyna Sokólska | Poland | 7.46 | |
| 34 | 4 | Joan Healy | Ireland | 7.46 | |
| 35 | 1 | Anniina Kortetmaa | Finland | 7.48 | |
| 36 | 3 | Anasztázia Nguyen | Hungary | 7.50 | |
| 37 | 5 | Kiriaki Samani | Greece | 7.69 | |
| | 2 | Mathilde Kramer | Denmark | DSQ | CR18.5 |
| | 2 | Yasmin Kwadwo | Germany | DSQ | TR17.3.2 |
| | 2 | Krystsina Tsimanouskaya | Belarus | DSQ | TR17.3.2 |

=== Semifinals ===
Qualification: First 2 in each heat (Q) and the next 2 fastest (q) advance to the Final.

| Rank | Heat | Athlete | Nationality | Time | Note |
|---|---|---|---|---|---|
| 1 | 2 | Ajla Del Ponte | Switzerland | 7.19 | Q |
| 2 | 1 | Carolle Zahi | France | 7.21 | Q |
| 3 | 3 | Lotta Kemppinen | Finland | 7.24 | Q |
| 4 | 2 | Maja Mihalinec | Slovenia | 7.25 | Q |
| 5 | 3 | Orlann Ombissa-Dzangue | France | 7.26 | Q |
| 5 | 2 | Jamile Samuel | Netherlands | 7.26 | q, SB |
| 7 | 3 | Claudia Payton | Sweden | 7.26 | q, PB |
| 8 | 1 | Jennifer Montag | Germany | 7.27 | Q |
| 9 | 1 | Salomé Kora | Switzerland | 7.27 | |
| 10 | 3 | Vittoria Fontana | Italy | 7.28 | PB |
| 11 | 1 | Rani Rosius | Belgium | 7.29 | |
| 11 | 2 | Rafaéla Spanoudaki-Hatziriga | Greece | 7.29 | |
| 13 | 3 | Amelie-Sophie Lederer | Germany | 7.29 | |
| 14 | 2 | Viktoriya Ratnikova | Ukraine | 7.31 | |
| 15 | 3 | Riccarda Dietsche | Switzerland | 7.32 | |
| 16 | 3 | Inna Eftimova | Bulgaria | 7.32 | |
| 17 | 1 | Astrid Glenner-Frandsen | Denmark | 7.32 | NR |
| 18 | 1 | Naomi Sedney | Netherlands | 7.35 | |
| 19 | 5 | Marina Andreea Baboi | Romania | 7.36 | |
| 20 | 1 | Ciara Neville | Ireland | 7.37 | |
| 21 | 1 | Rosalina Santos | Portugal | 7.38 | |
| 22 | 2 | Monika Weigertová | Slovakia | 7.42 | |
| 23 | 3 | Magdalena Lindner | Austria | 7.47 | |
| | 2 | Marcela Pírková | Czech Republic | DNS | |

=== Final ===
| Rank | Lane | Athlete | Nationality | Time | Note |
|---|---|---|---|---|---|
| 1st place, gold medalist(s) | 4 | Ajla Del Ponte | Switzerland | 7.03 | WL, =NR |
| 2nd place, silver medalist(s) | 5 | Lotta Kemppinen | Finland | 7.22 | |
| 3rd place, bronze medalist(s) | 1 | Jamile Samuel | Netherlands | 7.22 | SB |
| 4 | 8 | Orlann Ombissa-Dzangue | France | 7.23 | |
| 5 | 6 | Maja Mihalinec | Slovenia | 7.26 | |
| 6 | 3 | Carolle Zahi | France | 7.26 | |
| 7 | 7 | Jennifer Montag | Germany | 7.29 | |
| 8 | 2 | Claudia Payton | Sweden | 7.32 | |
