= Denmark at the 2022 European Championships =

in (Germany) Munich 11 August 2022 – 22 August 2022
- Competitors: 106 in 11 sports
- Medals Ranked 25th: Gold 1 Silver 3 Bronze 3 Total 7

European Championships appearances
- 2018; 2022

Denmark competed in the 2022 European Championships in Munich from August 11 to August 22, 2022.

== Medallists ==
Medal	Name	Sport	Event	Date
Gold	Emma Jørgensen	Canoeing	Women's K–1 200 metres	20 August
Silver	Tobias Hansen; Carl-Frederik Bévort; Robin Skivild; Rasmus Pedersen	Cycling	Men's team pursuit	12 August
Silver	Sebastian Fini Carstensen	Cycling	Men's cross-country	19 August
Silver	Frederikke Matthiesen; Sara Milthers; Pernille Knudsen; Bolette Iversen	Canoeing	Women's K-4 500 metres	21 August
Bronze	Amalie Dideriksen; Julie Leth	Cycling	Women's madison	16 August
Bronze	Ida Karstoft	Athletics	Women's 200 metres	19 August
Bronze	Emma Jørgensen	Canoeing	Women's K–1 500 metres	21 August

== Competitors ==
The following is the list of number of competitors in the Championships:

Sport	Men	Women	Total
Artistic Gymnastics (men and women)	2	5	7
Athletics	16	12	28
Beach volleyball	2	2	4
Canoe sprint	6	5	11
Cycling mountain bike	2	2	4
Cycling road	9	8	17
Cycling track	4	2	6
Rowing	8	11	19
Sport climbing	1	1	2
Table tennis	4	0	4
Triathlon	2	2	4
Total	56	50	106

== Athletics ==
Denmark entered the following athletes.

Key

- Q = Qualified for the next round
- q = Qualified for the next round as a fastest loser or, in field events, by position without achieving the qualifying target
- NR = National record
- PB = Personal best
- SB = Season best
- N/A = Round not applicable for the event

=== Men ===
Track and road events

Athlete	Event	Heat		Semifinal		Final	
Athlete	Event	Result	Rank	Result	Rank	Result	Rank
Kojo Musah	100 m	DNF	–	Did not advance			
Frederik Schou-Nielsen	100 m	10.34	5	Did not advance			
Simon Hansen	200 m	20.81	5 q	DNS	–	Did not advance	
Tazana Kamanga-Dyrbak	200 m	20.88	5	Did not advance			
Gustav Lundholm Nielsen	400 m	46.05 SB	5 q	46.30	8	Did not advance	
Benjamin Lobo Vedel	400 m	45.50 =NR	1 Q	DNS	–	Did not advance	
Joel Ibler Lillesø	5000 m	—N/a				13:50.24	22
Rune Bækgaard	Marathon	—N/a				2:31:37	62
Andreas Lommer	Marathon	—N/a				2:20:34	46
Martin Egebjerg Olesen	Marathon	—N/a				2:28:04	60
Abdi Hakin Ulad	Marathon	—N/a				2:16:41	27
Jakob Dybdal Abrahamsen	3000 m steeplechase	9:05.26	14	—N/a		Did not advance	
Axel Vang Christensen	3000 m steeplechase	DNF	–	—N/a		Did not advance	
Rasmus Thornbjerg Klausen; Frederik Schou-Nielsen; Tobias Larsen; Tazana Kamanga-Dyrbak	4 × 100 m relay	DNF	–	—N/a		Did not advance	

Field events

Athlete	Event	Qualification		Final	
Athlete	Event	Distance	Position	Distance	Position
Arthur Wiborg Petersen	Javelin throw	72.82	21	Did not advance	

=== Women ===
Track and road events

Athlete	Event	Heat		Semifinal		Final	
Athlete	Event	Result	Rank	Result	Rank	Result	Rank
Mathilde Kramer	100 m	11.58	6	Did not advance			
Ida Karstoft	200 m	Bye		22.73	1 Q	22.72	3rd place, bronze medalist(s)
Karen Ehrenreich	Marathon	—N/a				2:44:28	43
Mette Graversgaard	100 m hurdles	Bye		12.87	3 q	12.99	6
Mathilde Heltbech	100 m hurdles	13.41	5	Did not advance			
Annemarie Nissen	400 m hurdles	57.71	8	Did not advance			
Mette Graversgaard; Mathilde Kramer; Emma Beiter Bomme; Astrid Glenner-Frandsen	4 × 100 m relay	44.20	6	—N/a		Did not advance	

Field events

Athlete	Event	Qualification		Final	
Athlete	Event	Distance	Position	Distance	Position
Caroline Bonde Holm	Pole vault	4.50	=4 q	4.55 NR	=4
Lisa Brix Pedersen	Discus throw	59.40	8 q	57.02	10
Katrine Koch Jacobsen	Hammer throw	68.26	7 q	67.06	10

== Beach Volleyball ==
Denmark has qualified 1 male and female pair each.

Athlete	Event	Preliminary round			Round of 24	Round of 16	Quarterfinals	Semifinals	Final / BM	
Athlete	Event	Opposition Score	Opposition Score	Rank	Opposition Score	Opposition Score	Opposition Score	Opposition Score	Opposition Score	Rank
Kristoffer Abell; Jacob Stein Brinck	Men's	Ehlers – Wickler (GER); L 0–2 (21–18, 14–21, 18–20)	Boermans – Immers (NED); L 0–2 (18–21, 15–21)	4	Did not advance					25
Clara Windeleff; Sofia Nørager Bisgaard	Women's	Kravčenoka – Graudiņa (LAT); L 0–2 (16–21, 12–21)	Placette – Richard (FRA); W 2–0 (21–15, 21–17)	3 Q	Schützenhöfer – Plesiutschnig (AUT); W 2–0 (21–14, 22–20)	Hüberli – Brunner (SUI); L 0–2 (15–21, 16–21)	Did not advance			9

== Canoeing ==
Men

Athlete	Event	Heats		Semifinals		Final	
Athlete	Event	Time	Rank	Time	Rank	Time	Rank
Magnus Sibbersen	K-1 500 m	1:44.986	6 SF	1:44.793	2 FA	1:42.998	9
Rene Holtén Poulsen	K-1 1000 m	3:34.945	3 SF	3:38.059	3 FA	3:42.901	9
Rasmus Knudsen	K-1 5000 m	—N/a				KO	
Victor Aasmul; Rene Holtén Poulsen	K-2 500 m	1:34.913	4 SF	1:30.471	2 FA	1:33.621	9
Morten Graversen; Simon Jensen	K-2 1000 m	3:21.725	5 SF	3:18.152	1 F	3:20.548	7
Victor Aasmul; Morten Graversen; Rasmus Knudsen; Magnus Sibbersen	K-4 500 m	1:23.810	6 SF	1:23.251	7	Did not advance	13

Women

Athlete	Event	Heats		Semifinals		Final	
Athlete	Event	Time	Rank	Time	Rank	Time	Rank
Emma Jørgensen	K-1 200 m	40.663	2 F	—N/a		39.848	1st place, gold medalist(s)
Emma Jørgensen	K-1 500 m	1:59.633	4 SF	1:52.854	2 FA	1:55.206	3rd place, bronze medalist(s)
Bolette Iversen; Frederikke Matthiesen	K-2 500 m	1:50.864	5 SF	1:44.943	4 FB	1:45.454	10
Pernille Knudsen; Sara Milthers	K-2 1000 m	3:47.375	4 SF	3:57.674	1 F	3:44.064	8
Bolette Iversen; Pernille Knudsen; Frederikke Matthiesen; Sara Milthers	K-4 500 m	1:36.279	3 F	Bye		1:37.709	2nd place, silver medalist(s)

== Cycling ==
=== Road ===
Men

Athlete	Event	Time	Rank
Mikkel Bjerg	Road race	4:42:01	104
Mikkel Bjerg	Time trial	27:32.63	4
Lasse Norman Hansen	Road race	4:39:07	38
Mikkel Frølich Honoré	Road race	4:38:52	23
Morten Hulgaard	Time trial	28:18.47	8
Michael Mørkøv	Road race	4:39:02	33
Mathias Norsgaard	Road race	4:39:07	37
Mads Pedersen	Road race	4:38:49	10
Johan Price-Pejtersen	Road race	4:42:25	113
Frederik Wandahl	Road race	4:45:27	120

Women

Athlete	Event	Time	Rank
Amalie Dideriksen	Road race	2:59:30	36
Trine Holmsgaard	Road race	3:02:23	71
Marita Jensen	Road race	DNF	
Julie Leth	Road race	2:59:30	39
Emma Norsgaard	Road race	2:59:20	7
Emma Norsgaard	Time trial	32:55.34	11
Mia Sofie Rützou	Road race	DNF	
Mia Sofie Rützou	Time trial	35:48.73	29
Maja Winther Brandt Reisel	Road race	DNF	

=== Track ===
Elimination race

Athlete	Event	Final
Athlete	Event	Rank
Tobias Hansen	Men's elimination race	9

Madison

Athlete	Event	Final	
Athlete	Event	Points	Rank
Tobias Hansen; Robin Skivild	Men's madison	–15	8
Amalie Dideriksen; Julie Leth	Women's madison	38	3rd place, bronze medalist(s)

Omnium

Athlete	Event	Qualification		Scratch Race		Tempo Race		Elimination Race		Points Race		Total points	Rank
Athlete	Event	Rank	Points	Rank	Points	Rank	Points	Rank	Points	Rank	Points	Total points	Rank
Tobias Hansen	Men's omnium	7 Q	1	8	26	7	28	10	22	8	12	88	10
Amalie Dideriksen	Women's omnium	—N/a		7	28	3	36	8	26	9	30	120	8

Points race

Athlete	Event	Final	
Athlete	Event	Points	Rank
Julie Leth	Women's points race	30	4

Pursuit

Athlete	Event	Qualification		Semifinals		Final	
Athlete	Event	Time	Rank	Opponent Results	Rank	Opponent Results	Rank
Robin Skivild	Men's individual pursuit	4:21.803	11	—N/a		did not advance	
Carl-Frederik Bévort; Tobias Hansen; Rasmus Pedersen; Robin Skivild	Men's team pursuit	3:54.280	2 Q	Italy; W DNF	2 QG	France; L 3:51.692	2nd place, silver medalist(s)

Scratch

Athlete	Event	Final	
Athlete	Event	Laps down	Rank
Rasmus Pedersen	Men's scratch	–2	9

Time trial

Athlete	Event	Qualifying		Final	
Athlete	Event	Time	Rank	Time	Rank
Rasmus Pedersen	Men's 1 km time trial	1:00.234	4 Q	1:00.862	5

=== Mountain bike ===
Athlete	Event	Time	Rank
Simon Andreassen	Men's cross-country	1:20:28	20
Sebastian Fini Carstensen	Men's cross-country	1:18:20	2nd place, silver medalist(s)
Caroline Bohé	Women's cross-country	1:32:33	5
Malene Degn	Women's cross-country	1:33:29	8

== Gymnastics ==
Denmark entered two male and five female athletes.

=== Men ===
Qualification

Athlete	Qualification						Total	Rank
Athlete	Apparatus						Total	Rank
Athlete	F	PH	R	V	PB	HB	Total	Rank
Rani Dalsgarð	12.700	—N/a						
Aron Jacobsen	12.666	9.166	12.033	12.366	11.500	11.166	68.897	72

=== Women ===
Qualification

Athlete	Event	Qualification						Final					
Athlete	Event	Apparatus				Total	Rank	Apparatus				Total	Rank
Athlete	Event	V	UB	BB	F	Total	Rank	V	UB	BB	F	Total	Rank
Michelle Lauritsen	Team	11.633	11.633	—N/a				Did not advance					
Camille Normann	Team	—N/a	10.266	10.166	9.133	—N/a		Did not advance					
Freja Petersen	Team	11.566	10.833	11.500	11.733	45.632	58	Did not advance					
Camille Rasmussen	Team	13.733 Q	11.966	11.533	12.533	49.765	23	Did not advance					
Josephine Sørensen	Team	11.733	—N/a	10.200	11.300	—N/a		Did not advance					
Total	Team	37.099	34.432	33.233	35.566	140.330	21	Did not advance					

Individual finals

Athlete	Event	Apparatus				Rank
Athlete	Event	V	UB	BB	F	Rank
Camille Rasmussen	Vault	13.383	—N/a			6

== Rowing ==
Men

Athlete	Event	Heats		Repechage		Semifinals		Final	
Athlete	Event	Time	Rank	Time	Rank	Time	Rank	Time	Rank
Bastian Secher	Single sculls	7:57.90	2 SA/B	Bye		7:26.84	3 FA	7:35.43	6
Kåre Mortensen; Magnus Valbirk; Tobias Bork Christensen; Magnus Rathenborg	Coxless four	6:45.42	4 R	6:37.44	5 FB	—N/a		6:18.66	10
Rasmus Lind	Lightweight single sculls	7:58.97	2 SA/B	Bye		7:17.64	4 FB	7:32.70	8
Oscar Petersen; Alexander Modest	Lightweight double sculls	7:28.71	5 R	7:07.22	5 FB	—N/a		7:09.92	11

Women

Athlete	Event	Heats		Repechage		Semifinals		Final	
Athlete	Event	Time	Rank	Time	Rank	Time	Rank	Time	Rank
Sofie Vikkelsø; Nikoline Laidlaw	Coxless pair	8:02.57	4 R	7:50.69	5 FB	—N/a		7:39.34	9
Julie Poulsen; Marie Skytte Johannesen; Frida Sanggaard Nielsen; Astrid Steensberg	Coxless four	7:13.56	2 FA	Bye		—N/a		6:54.39	4
Nikoline Laidlaw; Sofie Vikkelsø; Christine Amalie Cardel; Cecilie Brunnich Sørensen; Julie Poulsen; Marie Skytte Johannesen; Frida Sanggaard Nielsen; Astrid Steensberg; Sophie Østergaard	Eight	7:02.32	3	—N/a				6:46.88	6
Mathilde Persson; Marie Morch-Pedersen	Lightweight double sculls	7:55.54	3 R	7:44.35	4 FB	—N/a		7:40.36	7

== Sport climbing ==
Boulder

Athlete	Event	Qualification		Semifinal		Final	
Athlete	Event	Result	Rank	Result	Rank	Result	Rank
Theis Lindegren Elfenbein	Men's boulder	0T2z 0 2	38	Did not advance			
Katrine Vandet Salling	Women's boulder	1T2z 1 2	40	Did not advance			

== Table tennis ==
=== Men ===
Athlete	Event	Qualification stage				Preliminary Round 1	Preliminary Round 2	Round of 64	Round of 32	Round of 16	Quarterfinals	Semifinals	Final / BM	
Athlete	Event	Opposition Score	Opposition Score	Opposition Score	Rank	Opposition Score	Opposition Score	Opposition Score	Opposition Score	Opposition Score	Opposition Score	Opposition Score	Opposition Score	Rank
Martin Buch Andersen	Singles	Kožul (SLO); L 1–3	Nielsen (GRL); W 3–0	Mladenovic (LUX); W 3–1	2 Q	Bye	Alexandrov (BUL); W 3–1	Ovtcharov (GER); L 1–4	Did not advance					33
Jonathan Groth	Singles	Bye						Levajac (SRB); L 3–4	Did not advance					33
Anders Lind	Singles	Movileanu (ROU); W 3–0	Tauber (ISR); W 3–0	—N/a	1 Q	Bye		Habesohn (AUT); L 1–4	Did not advance					33
Tobias Rasmussen	Singles	Nuytinck (BEL); L 0–3	Berzosa (ESP); W 3–1	—N/a	2 Q	Bobocica (ITA); L 0–3	Did not advance							73
Tobias Rasmussen; Martin Buch Andersen	Doubles	—N/a				Bye	Zelinka / Klajber (SVK); W 3–1	—N/a	Jarvis / Walker (ENG); W 3–0	Falck / Karlsson (SWE); L 1–3	Did not advance			9
Jonathan Groth; Liam Pitchford (ENG)	Doubles	—N/a				Bye	Mladenovski (MKD) / Karabaxhak (KOS); W 3–0	—N/a	Pištej (SVK) / Karakašević (SRB); L 2–3	Did not advance				17
Anders Lind; Wang Yang (SVK)	Doubles	—N/a				Bye	Peto / Jevtović (SRB); W 3–1	—N/a	Bobocica / Stoyanov (ITA); L 0–3	Did not advance				17

=== Mixed ===
Athlete	Event	Preliminary Round 1	Preliminary Round 2	Round of 32	Round of 16	Quarterfinals	Semifinals	Final / BM	
Athlete	Event	Opposition Score	Opposition Score	Opposition Score	Opposition Score	Opposition Score	Opposition Score	Opposition Score	Rank
Martin Buch Andersen; Inês Matos (POR)	Doubles	Gutić / Mešetović (BIH); W 3–1	Majoros / Hartbrich (HUN); W 3–0	Pištej / Balážová (SVK); L 2–3	Did not advance				17

== Triathlon ==
Athlete	Event	Swim (1.5 km)	Trans 1	Bike (40 km)	Trans 2	Run (10 km)	Total Time	Rank
Emil Holm	Men's	DNS						
Alberte Kjær Pedersen	Women's	20:07	0:37	56:40	0:27	35:41	1:53:32	8

=== Mixed ===
Athlete	Event	Swim (300 m)	Trans 1	Bike (6.8 km)	Trans 2	Run (2 km)	Total Group Time	Rank
Sif Bendix Madsen; Oscar Gladney Rundquist; Emil Holm; Alberte Kjær Pedersen	Mixed relay	15:57	2:56	46:25	1:41	20:51	1:27:59	9
