= 2015 World Youth Championships in Athletics – Girls' 200 metres =

Girls' 200 metres at the 2015 World Youth Championships in Athletics
- Venue: Estadio Olímpico Pascual Guerrero
- Dates: 17–19 July
- Competitors: 53 from 41 nations
- Winning time: 22.43

Medalists
gold medal	Candace Hill	United States
silver medal	Lauren Rain James	United States
bronze medal	Nicola De Bruyn	South Africa

The girls' 200 metres at the 2015 World Youth Championships in Athletics was held at the Estadio Olímpico Pascual Guerrero in Cali, Colombia from 17 to 19 July 2015.

== Records ==
Prior to the competition, the following records were as follows.

World Youth Best	Kaylin Whitney (USA)	22.47	Eugene, United States	28 June 2015
Championship Record	Irene Ekelund (SWE)	22.92	Donetsk, Ukraine	14 July 2013
World Youth Leading	Kaylin Whitney (USA)	22.47	Eugene, United States	28 June 2015

== Results ==
=== Round 1 ===
First 3 in each heat (Q) and the next 3 fastest (q) advance to the semifinals.

Rank	Heat	Name	Nationality	Time	Note
1	4	Lauren Rain Williams	United States	23.41	Q
2	2	Estelle Raffai	France	23.91	Q
3	1	Candace Hill	United States	23.93	Q
4	5	Nicola De Bruyn	South Africa	23.99	Q
5	3	Alessia Pavese	Italy	24.02	Q, PB
6	1	Klaudia Adamek	Poland	24.21	Q, PB
7	7	Shaneil English	Jamaica	24.23	Q
8	5	Romina Cifuentes	Ecuador	24.28	Q
9	3	Brianne Bethel	Bahamas	24.32	Q
9	5	Ashlan Best	Canada	24.32	Q
11	6	Nikola Bendová	Czech Republic	24.33	Q
12	7	Ina Huemer	Austria	24.37	Q, PB
13	4	Anastasiia Bryzhina	Ukraine	24.40	Q
14	2	Kayla Anise Richardson	Philippines	24.41	Q
15	7	Ami Saito	Japan	24.44	Q
15	5	Huang Jiaxin	China	24.44	q, PB
17	4	Georgia Hulls	New Zealand	24.47	Q
18	6	Tristan Evelyn	Barbados	24.48	Q
19	1	Angélica Gamboa	Colombia	24.63	Q, PB
19	3	Shellece Clark	Jamaica	24.63	Q
19	7	Madia Ehlers	South Africa	24.63	q
22	2	Gabriela Mourão	Brazil	24.65	Q
23	4	Liang Nuo	China	24.71	q
24	7	Helene Rønningen	Norway	24.76	
25	1	Shereen Samson Vallabouy	Malaysia	24.81	
26	3	Ebhani Blackwood	Canada	24.82	PB
27	6	Ana Carolina Azevedo	Brazil	24.95	Q
28	1	Bliss Soleyn	Antigua and Barbuda	25.00	
29	5	Shalysa Wray	Cayman Islands	25.01	
30	3	Agata Zupin	Slovenia	25.07	
30	1	Fanny Estupiñán	Ecuador	25.07	
32	2	Kristine Berger	Norway	25.17	
33	7	Emma Beiter Bomme	Denmark	25.24	
34	4	L't'sha Fahie	British Virgin Islands	25.26	
35	2	Patrícia Garčárová	Slovakia	25.28	
35	3	Marija Nonković	Serbia	25.28	
37	2	Shantel Williams	Saint Vincent and the Grenadines	25.29	PB
38	6	Tamara Damjanović	Serbia	25.36	
38	4	Karin Strametz	Austria	25.36	
40	5	Mária Šimlovičová	Slovakia	25.47	
40	3	Damaris Akoth	Kenya	25.47	PB
42	2	Mónica Mendoza	Spain	25.49	
43	4	Edmari Acevedo	Venezuela	25.54	
44	6	Kugapriya Chandran	Singapore	25.56	
44	5	Ramyellie Valentin	Puerto Rico	25.56	
46	6	Blayre Catalyn	Bahamas	25.58	
47	7	Akia Guerrier	Turks and Caicos Islands	25.68	
48	2	Regine Tugade	Guam	25.81	
49	1	Trần Mai Hạnh	Vietnam	25.92	
50	6	Anna Shimanis	Uzbekistan	26.16	
51	3	Hanah Mills	Saint Kitts and Nevis	26.24	
52	5	Wu Cheuk Yan	Hong Kong	26.62	
–	6	Diana Vaisman	Israel	DQ	

=== Semifinal ===
First 2 in each heat (Q) and the next 2 fastest (q) advance to the final. Georgia Hulls achieved time in individual rerun.

Rank	Heat	Name	Nationality	Time	Note
1	3	Lauren Rain Williams	United States	23.03	Q, PB
2	2	Candace Hill	United States	23.21	Q
3	2	Nicola De Bruyn	South Africa	23.54	Q, PB
4	1	Estelle Raffai	France	23.72	Q, PB
5	1	Alessia Pavese	Italy	23.89	Q, PB
6	3	Anastasiia Bryzhina	Ukraine	23.92	Q, PB
7	3	Nikola Bendová	Czech Republic	24.02	q
8	3	Shaneil English	Jamaica	24.07	q
9	1	Klaudia Adamek	Poland	24.16	PB
10	4	Georgia Hulls	New Zealand	24.18	
11	2	Ashlan Best	Canada	24.22	PB
12	1	Madia Ehlers	South Africa	24.23	
13	3	Gabriela Mourão	Brazil	24.24	PB
14	2	Huang Jiaxin	China	24.29	PB
15	1	Ina Huemer	Austria	24.35	PB
16	2	Romina Cifuentes	Ecuador	24.38	
16	2	Ami Saito	Japan	24.38	
18	3	Kayla Anise Richardson	Philippines	24.41	
19	3	Angélica Gamboa	Colombia	24.44	PB
20	2	Ana Carolina Azevedo	Brazil	24.46	
21	3	Liang Nuo	China	24.59	PB
22	1	Shellece Clark	Jamaica	24.72	
–	1	Georgia Hulls	New Zealand	DQ	
–	2	Brianne Bethel	Bahamas	DNS	
–	1	Tristan Evelyn	Barbados	DNS	

=== Final ===
Rank	Name	Nationality	Time	Note
1st place, gold medalist(s)	Candace Hill	United States	22.43	WYB
2nd place, silver medalist(s)	Lauren Rain Williams	United States	22.90	PB
3rd place, bronze medalist(s)	Nicola De Bruyn	South Africa	23.38	PB
4	Estelle Raffai	France	23.67	PB
5	Nikola Bendová	Czech Republic	23.78	
6	Anastasiia Bryzhina	Ukraine	23.84	PB
7	Alessia Pavese	Italy	23.86	PB
–	Shaneil English	Jamaica	DNS	
