= Athletics at the 2020 Summer Olympics – Women's 4 × 100 metres relay =

Women's 4 × 100 metres relay at the Games of the XXXII Olympiad
- Olympic Athletics
- Venue: Japan National Stadium
- Dates: 5 August 2021 (round 1); 6 August 2021 (final)
- Competitors: 68 from 16 nations
- Winning time: 41.02

Medalists
1st place, gold medalist(s)		Briana Williams; Elaine Thompson-Herah; Shelly-Ann Fraser-Pryce; Shericka Jackson; Natasha Morrison*; Remona Burchell*	Jamaica
2nd place, silver medalist(s)		Javianne Oliver; Teahna Daniels; Jenna Prandini; Gabrielle Thomas; English Gardner*; Aleia Hobbs*	United States
3rd place, bronze medalist(s)		Asha Philip; Imani Lansiquot; Dina Asher-Smith; Daryll Neita	Great Britain

The women's 4 × 100 metres relay event at the 2020 Summer Olympics took place on 5 and 6 August 2021 at the Japan National Stadium. There were 16 competing relay teams, with each team having 5 members from which 4 were selected in each round.

== Background ==
This was the 22nd appearance of the event, having appeared at every Olympics since women's athletics was introduced in 1928.

== Qualification ==
A National Olympic Committee (NOC) could qualify a relay team of 5 athletes in one of three ways. A total of 16 NOCs qualified.

- The top 8 NOCs at the 2019 World Athletics Championships qualified a relay team.
- The top 8 NOCs at the 2021 World Athletics Relays qualified a relay team.
- Where an NOC placed in the top 8 at both the 2019 World Championships and the 2021 World Relays, the quota place was allocated to the world ranking list as of 29 June 2021. In this case, 2 teams did so, so there are 2 places available through the world rankings.

The qualifying period was originally from 1 May 2019 to 29 June 2020. Due to the COVID-19 pandemic, the period was suspended from 6 April 2020 to 30 November 2020, with the end date extended to 29 June 2021. The qualifying time standards could be obtained in various meets during the given period that have the approval of the IAAF. Both indoor and outdoor meets are eligible. The most recent Area Championships may be counted in the ranking, even if not during the qualifying period.

== Competition format ==
The event continued to use the two-round format introduced in 2012.

== Records ==
Prior to this competition, the existing world, Olympic, and area records were as follows.

World record	Tianna Madison, Allyson Felix, Bianca Knight, Carmelita Jeter (USA)	40.82	London, United Kingdom	10 August 2012
Olympic record	Tianna Madison, Allyson Felix, Bianca Knight, Carmelita Jeter (USA)	40.82	London, United Kingdom	10 August 2012

Area	Time (s)	Athletes	Nation
Africa (records)	42.39	Beatrice Utondu; Faith Idehen; Christy Opara-Thompson; Mary Onyali-Omagbemi	Nigeria
Asia (records)	42.23	Xiao Lin; Li Yali; Liu Xiaomei; Li Xuemei	China
Europe (records)	41.37	Silke Gladisch; Sabine Rieger; Ingrid Auerswald; Marlies Göhr	East Germany
North, Central America and Caribbean (records)	40.82 WR	Tianna Madison; Allyson Felix; Bianca Knight; Carmelita Jeter	United States
Oceania (records)	42.99	Rachael Massey; Suzanne Broadrick; Jodi Lambert; Melinda Gainsford-Taylor	Australia
South America (records)	42.29	Evelyn dos Santos; Ana Claudia Silva; Franciela Krasucki; Rosângela Santos	Brazil

The following national records were established during the competition:

Country	Athlete	Round	Time	Notes
Great Britain	Asha Philip, Imani-Lara Lansiquot, Dina Asher-Smith, Daryll Neita	Heats	41.55	
Italy	Irene Siragusa, Gloria Hooper, Anna Bongiorni, Vittoria Fontana	Heats	42.84	
Ecuador	Marizol Landázuri, Anahí Suárez, Yuliana Angulo, Ángela Tenorio	Heats	43.69	
Switzerland	Riccarda Dietsche, Ajla Del Ponte, Mujinga Kambundji, Salomé Kora	Heats	42.05	
Denmark	Mathilde Kramer, Astrid Glenner-Frandsen, Emma Beiter Bomme, Ida Karstoft	Heats	43.51	
Jamaica	Briana Williams, Elaine Thompson-Herah, Shelly-Ann Fraser-Pryce, Shericka Jackson	Final	41.02	

== Schedule ==
All times are Japan Standard Time (UTC+9)

The women's 4 × 100 metres relay took place over two consecutive days.

Date	Time	Round
Thursday, 5 August 2021	9:00	Round 1
Friday, 6 August 2021	19:50	Final

== Results ==
=== Heats ===
Qualification Rules: First 3 in each heat (Q) and the next 2 fastest (q) advance to the Final

==== Heat 1 ====
Rank	Lane	Nation	Competitors	Reaction	Time	Notes
3	5	Great Britain	Asha Philip, Imani-Lara Lansiquot, Dina Asher-Smith, Daryll Neita	0.132	41.55	NR, Q
2	4	United States	Javianne Oliver, Teahna Daniels, English Gardner, Aleia Hobbs	0.140	41.90	SB, Q
1	6	Jamaica	Briana Williams, Natasha Morrison, Remona Burchell, Shericka Jackson	0.180	42.15	SB, Q
4	3	France	Carolle Zahi, Orlann Ombissa-Dzangue, Gémima Joseph, Cynthia Leduc	0.156	42.68	SB, q
5	2	Netherlands	Nadine Visser, Dafne Schippers, Marije van Hunenstijn, Naomi Sedney	0.151	42.81	SB, q
6	9	Italy	Irene Siragusa, Gloria Hooper, Anna Bongiorni, Vittoria Fontana	0.143	42.84	NR
7	8	Japan	Hanae Aoyama, Mei Kodama, Ami Saito, Remi Tsuruta	0.145	43.44	SB
8	7	Ecuador	Marizol Landázuri, Anahí Suárez, Yuliana Angulo, Ángela Tenorio	0.141	43.69	NR

==== Heat 2 ====
Rank	Lane	Nation	Competitors	Reaction	Time	Notes
1	7	Germany	Rebekka Haase, Alexandra Burghardt, Tatjana Pinto, Gina Lückenkemper	0.216	42.00	SB, Q
2	6	Switzerland	Riccarda Dietsche, Ajla Del Ponte, Mujinga Kambundji, Salomé Kora	0.166	42.05	NR, Q
3	3	China	Liang Xiaojing, Ge Manqi, Huang Guifen, Wei Yongli	0.137	42.82	Q
4	8	Poland	Marika Popowicz-Drapała, Klaudia Adamek, Paulina Paluch, Pia Skrzyszowska	0.156	43.09	SB
5	2	Brazil	Bruna Farias, Ana Cláudia Lemos, Vitória Cristina Rosa, Rosângela Santos	0.128	43.15	SB
6	4	Nigeria	Oluwatobiloba Amusan, Nzubechi Grace Nwokocha, Patience Okon George, Ese Brume	0.164	43.25	
7	5	Denmark	Mathilde Kramer, Astrid Glenner-Frandsen, Emma Beiter Bomme, Ida Karstoft	0.157	43.51	NR
8	9	Trinidad and Tobago	Khalifa St. Fort, Michelle-Lee Ahye, Kai Selvon, Kelly-Ann Baptiste	0.196	43.62	SB

=== Final ===
Setting a national record, Jamaica won the gold medal with the third fastest time in history.

Rank	Lane	Nation	Competitors	Reaction	Time	Notes
1st place, gold medalist(s)	8	Jamaica	Briana Williams, Elaine Thompson-Herah, Shelly-Ann Fraser-Pryce, Shericka Jackson	0.188	41.02	NR
2nd place, silver medalist(s)	6	United States	Javianne Oliver, Teahna Daniels, Jenna Prandini, Gabrielle Thomas	0.132	41.45	SB
3rd place, bronze medalist(s)	5	Great Britain	Asha Philip, Imani-Lara Lansiquot, Dina Asher-Smith, Daryll Neita	0.121	41.88	
4	7	Switzerland	Riccarda Dietsche, Ajla Del Ponte, Mujinga Kambundji, Salomé Kora	0.166	42.08	
5	4	Germany	Rebekka Haase, Alexandra Burghardt, Tatjana Pinto, Gina Lückenkemper	0.196	42.12	
6	9	China	Liang Xiaojing, Ge Manqi, Huang Guifen, Wei Yongli	0.160	42.71	SB
7	3	France	Carolle Zahi, Orlann Ombissa-Dzangue, Gémima Joseph, Cynthia Leduc	0.146	42.89	
	2	Netherlands	Nadine Visser, Dafne Schippers, Marije van Hunenstijn, Naomi Sedney	0.148	DNF	
