= 2015 World Youth Championships in Athletics – Girls' 100 metres =

Girls' 100 metres at the 2015 World Youth Championships in Athletics
- Venue: Estadio Olímpico Pascual Guerrero
- Dates: 16 July
- Competitors: 58 from 44 nations
- Winning time: 11.08 CR

Medalists
gold medal	Candace Hill	United States
silver medal	Khalifa St. Fort	Trinidad and Tobago
bronze medal	Jayla Kirkland	United States

The girls' 100 metres at the 2015 World Youth Championships in Athletics was held at the Estadio Olímpico Pascual Guerrero in Cali, Colombia on 16 July 2015.

== Records ==
Prior to the competition, the following records were as follows.

World Youth Best	Candace Hill (USA)	10.98	Shoreline, United States	20 June 2015
Championship Record	Jessica Onyepunuka (USA)	11.31	Sherbrooke, Canada	11 July 2003
World Youth Leading	Candace Hill (USA)	10.98	Shoreline, United States	20 June 2015

== Results ==
=== Round 1 ===
First 2 in each heat (Q) and the next 8 fastest (q) advance to the semifinals.

Rank	Heat	Name	Nationality	Time	Note
1	8	Hannah Brier	Great Britain	11.39	Q, PB
1	2	Khalifa St. Fort	Trinidad and Tobago	11.39	Q, PB
3	1	Candace Hill	United States	11.47	Q
4	4	Tristan Evelyn	Barbados	11.57	Q
5	5	Kimone Shaw	Jamaica	11.58	Q
6	7	Keshia Kwadwo	Germany	11.59	Q, PB
7	3	Estelle Raffai	France	11.64	Q
8	6	Nicola De Bruyn	South Africa	11.74	Q
8	3	Nikola Bendová	Czech Republic	11.74	Q
10	7	Jayla Kirkland	United States	11.76	Q
11	2	Katrin Fehm	Germany	11.79	Q, PB
12	4	Diana Vaisman	Israel	11.83	Q
12	8	Vanesha Pusey	Jamaica	11.83	Q, PB
14	4	Georgia Hulls	New Zealand	11.85	q, PB
15	8	Ana Carolina Azevedo	Brazil	11.87	q
15	3	Gabriela Mourão	Brazil	11.87	q, PB
17	6	Brianne Bethel	Bahamas	11.88	Q
18	7	Mechaela Hyacinth	Saint Lucia	11.91	q, PB
19	1	Sarah Richard	France	11.94	Q
19	2	Angélica Gamboa	Colombia	11.94	q, PB
19	8	Bliss Soleyn	Antigua and Barbuda	11.94	q
22	5	Jorden Savoury	Canada	11.95	Q, SB
22	4	L't'sha Fahie	British Virgin Islands	11.95	q
24	6	Helene Rønningen	Norway	11.96	q
25	4	Edmari Acevedo	Venezuela	11.99	PB
26	5	Emma Girardello	Italy	12.02	
26	1	Klaudia Adamek	Poland	12.02	
28	3	Anna Modesti	Italy	12.04	
29	1	Anail Pérez	Dominican Republic	12.15	PB
29	3	Nathalie Ommundsen Johnsen	Norway	12.15	PB
31	2	Marina Baboi	Romania	12.16	
31	8	Huang Jiaxin	China	12.16	
33	5	Josielys O'Farril	Puerto Rico	12.17	PB
34	5	Blayre Catalyn	Bahamas	12.18	
35	2	Mónica Mendoza	Spain	12.20	
36	6	Rosa Ruíz	Colombia	12.21	
37	7	Nia Jack	United States Virgin Islands	12.22	
37	3	Tamara Damjanović	Serbia	12.22	
39	6	Arielle Tessier	Canada	12.24	
39	1	Ina Huemer	Austria	12.24	
41	5	Yimabel Ferrin	Ecuador	12.26	
42	8	Pamela Milano	Venezuela	12.29	
43	6	Miku Yamada	Japan	12.32	
44	2	Lea Obeid	Lebanon	12.35	
44	4	Mária Šimlovičová	Slovakia	12.35	
46	2	Anja Kovač	Serbia	12.38	
46	8	Emma Beiter Bomme	Denmark	12.38	
46	4	Ramyellie Valentin	Puerto Rico	12.38	
49	7	Paola Ascencio	Mexico	12.39	
50	7	Shalysa Wray	Cayman Islands	12.40	
50	3	Carolina Ocampo	Bolivia	12.40	PB
52	1	Patrícia Garčárová	Slovakia	12.45	
53	1	Selena Arjona	Panama	12.46	
54	7	Smriti Manesh Menon	Singapore	12.50	
55	5	Poon Hang Wai	Hong Kong	12.52	
56	6	Martina Miroska	North Macedonia	12.92	PB
57	6	Mariana Cress	Marshall Islands	13.27	
58	3	Zarinae Sapong	Northern Mariana Islands	13.62	PB

=== Semifinal ===
First 2 in each heat (Q) and the next 2 fastest (q) advance to the final.

Rank	Heat	Name	Nationality	Time	Note
1	2	Candace Hill	United States	11.16	Q, CR
2	1	Khalifa St. Fort	Trinidad and Tobago	11.24	Q, CR
3	3	Jayla Kirkland	United States	11.54	Q, SB
4	3	Hannah Brier	Great Britain	11.55	Q
5	1	Estelle Raffai	France	11.64	Q
6	1	Keshia Kwadwo	Germany	11.66	q
7	3	Kimone Shaw	Jamaica	11.68	q
8	2	Tristan Evelyn	Barbados	11.73	Q
8	3	Nicola De Bruyn	South Africa	11.73	
10	1	Diana Vaisman	Israel	11.79	
11	2	Nikola Bendová	Czech Republic	11.87	
11	1	Mechaela Hyacinth	Saint Lucia	11.87	PB
13	2	Sarah Richard	France	11.88	
14	1	Vanesha Pusey	Jamaica	11.89	
15	2	Katrin Fehm	Germany	11.91	
16	3	Brianne Bethel	Bahamas	11.92	
17	3	L't'sha Fahie	British Virgin Islands	11.93	
18	1	Helene Rønningen	Norway	11.94	
19	1	Ana Carolina Azevedo	Brazil	11.95	
20	3	Georgia Hulls	New Zealand	11.98	
21	2	Angélica Gamboa	Colombia	12.09	
22	2	Jorden Savoury	Canada	12.10	
23	3	Gabriela Mourão	Brazil	12.13	
24	2	Bliss Soleyn	Antigua and Barbuda	12.15	

=== Final ===
Rank	Name	Nationality	Time	Note
1st place, gold medalist(s)	Candace Hill	United States	11.08	CR
2nd place, silver medalist(s)	Khalifa St. Fort	Trinidad and Tobago	11.19	PB
3rd place, bronze medalist(s)	Jayla Kirkland	United States	11.41	PB
4	Tristan Evelyn	Barbados	11.59	
5	Kimone Shaw	Jamaica	11.65	
6	Hannah Brier	Great Britain	11.66	
7	Estelle Raffai	France	11.73	
8	Keshia Kwadwo	Germany	11.76	
