= 2022 World Athletics Indoor Championships – Women's 60 metres =

Women's 60 metres at the 2022 World Athletics Indoor Championships
- Venue: Štark Arena
- Dates: 18 March
- Competitors: 47 from 38 nations
- Winning time: 6.96

Medalists
gold medal	Mujinga Kambundji	Switzerland
silver medal	Mikiah Brisco	United States
bronze medal	Marybeth Sant-Price	United States

The women's 60 metres at the 2022 World Athletics Indoor Championships took place on 18 March 2022.

== Results ==
=== Heats ===
Qualification: First 3 in each heat (Q) and the next 6 fastest (q) advance to the Semi-Finals

The heats were started at 10:15.

Rank	Heat	Lane	Name	Nationality	Time	Notes
1	3	5	Mikiah Brisco	United States	7.03	Q, PB
2	6	3	Briana Williams	Jamaica	7.06	Q, PB
3	1	5	Marybeth Sant-Price	United States	7.07	Q
4	4	3	Ewa Swoboda	Poland	7.10	Q
5	3	8	Géraldine Frey	Switzerland	7.11	Q, PB
6	5	6	Daryll Neita	Great Britain	7.13	Q
7	3	4	Zoe Hobbs	New Zealand	7.13	Q, AR
8	1	4	Zaynab Dosso	Italy	7.14	Q, NR
9	5	5	Shericka Jackson	Jamaica	7.16	Q
10	2	3	Mujinga Kambundji	Switzerland	7.17	Q
11	4	8	Lotta Kemppinen	Finland	7.19	Q
12	3	6	Patrizia van der Weken	Luxembourg	7.21	q, NR
13	1	2	Claudia Payton	Sweden	7.21	Q, PB
14	4	6	Anthonique Strachan	Bahamas	7.22	Q
15	1	1	Gina Bass	Gambia	7.22	q, SB
16	5	1	Diana Vaisman	Israel	7.23	Q, NR
17	2	6	Michelle-Lee Ahye	Trinidad and Tobago	7.23	Q
18	2	4	María Isabel Pérez	Spain	7.23	Q
18	6	6	Pia Skrzyszowska	Poland	7.23	Q
20	1	6	Lorène Bazolo	Portugal	7.24	q
21	3	2	Molly Scott	Ireland	7.26	q
22	4	2	Vitória Cristina Rosa	Brazil	7.27	q
23	2	7	Ida Karstoft	Denmark	7.29	q
24	4	4	N'ketia Seedo	Netherlands	7.30	
25	6	2	Cheyanne Evans-Gray	Great Britain	7.30	Q
26	6	1	Aurora Berton	Italy	7.30	
27	2	2	Bassant Hemida	Egypt	7.31	NR
28	5	2	Rani Rosius	Belgium	7.33	
29	6	4	Gina Lückenkemper	Germany	7.33	
30	6	8	Dutee Chand	India	7.35	SB
31	5	4	Viktória Forster	Slovakia	7.35	
32	5	3	Rafaéla Spanoudaki-Hatziriga	Greece	7.35	
33	2	5	Jasmine Abrams	Guyana	7.36	
34	2	1	Rosalina Santos	Portugal	7.37	
35	1	8	Marina Andreea Baboi	Romania	7.38	
36	6	5	Eva Kubíčková	Czech Republic	7.38	
37	3	7	Farzaneh Fasihi	Iran	7.39	
38	2	8	Kristina Knott	Philippines	7.39	SB
39	4	7	Milana Tirnanić	Serbia	7.42	
40	1	3	Monika Weigertová	Slovakia	7.43	
41	4	5	Olivia Fotopoulou	Cyprus	7.45	
42	6	7	Aziza Sbaity	Lebanon	7.47	NR
43	3	3	Guðbjörg Jóna Bjarnadóttir	Iceland	7.47	
44	5	7	Carla Scicluna	Malta	7.71	
45	1	7	Winfrida Makenji	Tanzania	7.71	PB
46	5	8	Charlotte Afriat	Monaco	8.06	SB
	3	1	Rosângela Santos	Brazil	DQ	TR16.8

=== Semifinals ===
Qualification: First 2 in each heat (Q) and the next 2 fastest (q) advance to the Final

The heats were started at 18:05.

Rank	Heat	Lane	Name	Nationality	Time	Notes
1	1	4	Ewa Swoboda	Poland	7.03	Q
2	2	6	Mikiah Brisco	United States	7.03	Q, PB
3	1	3	Marybeth Sant-Price	United States	7.05	Q
4	1	6	Shericka Jackson	Jamaica	7.08	q, PB
5	2	4	Mujinga Kambundji	Switzerland	7.08	Q
6	3	3	Briana Williams	Jamaica	7.08	Q
7	3	4	Michelle-Lee Ahye	Trinidad and Tobago	7.14	Q, SB
8	3	2	Vitória Cristina Rosa	Brazil	7.14	q, AR
9	3	6	Géraldine Frey	Switzerland	7.15	
10	3	5	Daryll Neita	Great Britain	7.15	
11	2	8	Zoe Hobbs	New Zealand	7.16	
12	2	5	Zaynab Dosso	Italy	7.16	
13	1	7	Anthonique Strachan	Bahamas	7.17	PB
14	2	3	Pia Skrzyszowska	Poland	7.17	
15	1	5	Lotta Kemppinen	Finland	7.19	
16	2	7	Cheyanne Evans-Gray	Great Britain	7.19	PB
17	1	8	Diana Vaisman	Israel	7.20	NR
18	3	7	María Isabel Pérez	Spain	7.20	
19	1	1	Molly Scott	Ireland	7.23	
20	1	2	Lorène Bazolo	Portugal	7.24	
21	2	1	Patrizia van der Weken	Luxembourg	7.28	
22	2	2	Ida Karstoft	Denmark	7.30	
23	3	1	Gina Bass	Gambia	7.31	
	3	8	Claudia Payton	Sweden	DQ	TR16.8

=== Final ===
The final was started at 20:52.

Rank	Lane	Name	Nationality	Time	Notes
1st place, gold medalist(s)	7	Mujinga Kambundji	Switzerland	6.96	WL
2nd place, silver medalist(s)	4	Mikiah Brisco	United States	6.99	PB
3rd place, bronze medalist(s)	3	Marybeth Sant-Price	United States	7.04	(.032) PB
4	5	Ewa Swoboda	Poland	7.04	(.034)
5	6	Briana Williams	Jamaica	7.04	(.039) PB
6	1	Shericka Jackson	Jamaica	7.04	(.040) PB
7	8	Michelle-Lee Ahye	Trinidad and Tobago	7.11	
8	2	Vitória Cristina Rosa	Brazil	7.21	
