= 2022 USA Indoor Track and Field Championships =

2022 USA Track & Field Indoor Championships
- Dates: February 26–27
- Host city: Spokane, Washington, United States
- Venue: The Podium
- Level: Senior
- Type: Indoor
- Events: 24 (men: 12; women: 12)
- Participation: 304 = 171 M + 133 W athletes
- Records set: 2

The 2022 USA Indoor Track and Field Championships were held at The Podium in Spokane, Washington. Organized by USA Track and Field (USATF), the two-day competition took place from February 26 to February 27 and served as the national championships in track and field for the United States and selection meet for Team USA for 2022 World Athletics Indoor Championships March 18 to 20, 2022 in Belgrade, Serbia.

== Medal summary ==
=== Men's track ===
Event	Gold		Silver		Bronze	
60 metres	Christian Coleman	6.45	Marvin Bracy	6.48	Brandon Carnes	6.54
400 metres	Trevor Bassitt	45.75	Donavan Brazier	46.14	Marqueze Washington	46.15
800 metres	Bryce Hoppel	1:45.30	Isaiah Harris	1:46.30	Shane Streich	1:46.86
1500 metres	Cole Hocker	3:39.09 MR	Josh Thompson	3:39.24	Henry Wynne	3:39.60
3000 metres	Cole Hocker	7:47.50	Emmanuel Bor	7:48.64	Dillon Maggard	7:49.05
60 m hurdles	Grant Holloway	7.37 =MR	Jarret Eaton	7.47	Aaron Mallett	7.54

=== Men's field ===
Event	Gold		Silver		Bronze	
High jump	JuVaughn Harrison	2.28 m (7 ft 5 3/4 in)	Darryl Sullivan Jr.	2.25 m (7 ft 4 1/2 in)	Darius Carbin	2.25 m (7 ft 4 1/2 in)
Pole vault	Chris Nilsen	5.91 m (19 ft 4 1/2 in)	KC Lightfoot	5.86 m (19 ft 2 1/2 in)	Zach McWhorter	5.81 m (19 ft 1/2 in)
Long jump	Jarrion Lawson	8.19 m (26 ft 10 1/4 in)	Marquis Dendy	8.14 m (26 ft 8 1/4 in)	JuVaughn Harrison	8.05 m (26 ft 4 3/4 in)
Triple jump	Donald Scott	16.88 m (55 ft 4 1/2 in)	Chris Carter	16.67 m (54 ft 8 1/4 in)	Will Claye	16.36 m (53 ft 8 in)
Shot put	Ryan Crouser	22.51 m (73 ft 10 in)	Josh Awotunde	21.74 m (71 ft 3 3/4 in)	Roger Steen	21.07 m (69 ft 1 1/2 in)
Weight Throw	Alex Young	24.84 m (81 ft 5 3/4 in)	Daniel Haugh	24.79 m (81 ft 3 3/4 in)	Rudy Winkler	23.77 m (77 ft 11 3/4 in)
Heptathlon	Garrett Scantling	6382 points MR	Samuel Black	5866 points	Jack Flood	5803 points

=== Women's track ===
Event	Gold		Silver		Bronze	
60 metres	Mikiah Brisco	7.07	Marybeth Sant Price	7.08	Kayla White	7.10
400 metres	Lynna Irby	51.88	Jessica Beard	52.05	Naasha Robinson	52.50
800 metres	Ajeé Wilson	2:01.72	Olivia Baker	2:02.14	Brooke Feldmeier	2:03.01
1500 metres	Heather MacLean	4:06.09	Josette Norris	4:06.13	Elle Purrier St. Pierre	4:06.14
3000 metres	Elle Purrier St. Pierre	8:41.53	Alicia Monson	8:43.86	Weini Kelati	8:47.77
60 m hurdles	Gabbi Cunningham	7.82	Alaysha Johnson	7.91	Christina Clemons	7.92

=== Women's field ===
Event	Gold		Silver		Bronze	
High jump	Vashti Cunningham	1.91 m (6 ft 3 in)	Nicole Greene	1.91 m (6 ft 3 in)	Jelena Rowe	1.91 m (6 ft 3 in)
Pole vault	Sandi Morris	4.80 m (15 ft 8 3/4 in)	Katie Nageotte	4.75 m (15 ft 7 in)	Bridget Williams	4.70 m (15 ft 5 in)
Long jump	Quanesha Burks	6.55 m (21 ft 5 3/4 in)	Tiffany Flynn	6.49 m (21 ft 3 1/2 in)	Sha'Keela Saunders	6.48 m (21 ft 3 in)
Triple jump	Keturah Orji	14.28 m (46 ft 10 in)	Tori Franklin	13.78 m (45 ft 2 1/2 in)	Imani Oliver	13.51 m (44 ft 3 3/4 in)
Shot put	Magdalyn Ewen	19.79 m (64 ft 11 in)	Chase Ealey	19.10 m (62 ft 7 3/4 in)	Jessica Woodard	18.70 m (61 ft 4 in)
Weight Throw	Janee Kassanavoid	24.28 m (79 ft 7 3/4 in)	Erin Reese	23.72 m (77 ft 9 3/4 in)	Lara Boman	23.59 m (77 ft 4 1/2 in)
Pentathlon	Chari Hawkins	4492 points	Kendell Williams	4399 points	Maddie Nickal	4120 points

== Qualification ==
The 2022 USA Indoor Track and Field Championships serve as the qualification meet for United States representatives in international competitions, including the 2022 World Athletics Indoor Championships from 18 to 20 March 2022 in Belgrade, Serbia. In order to be entered, athletes need to achieve a qualifying standard mark and place in the top 2 in their event and top 12 in the world. The United States team, as managed by USATF, can also bring a qualified back up athlete in case one of the team members is unable to perform.

Additionally, defending 2021 World Athletics Indoor Tour Winner (received a wildcard spot subject to ratification by their country) and World Champions received byes into the 2022 World Championships. The athletes eligible for a bye are:

=== Defending World Champions ===
- Courtney Okolo – 400 m
- Will Claye – Triple Jump
- Christian Coleman – 60 m
- Kendra Harrison – 60 m hurdles
- Sandi Morris – Pole vault

=== Defending World Tour Winner ===
- Javianne Oliver – 60 m
- Grant Holloway – 60 m hurdles

== Schedule ==
H	Heats	½	Semi-finals	F	Final
M = morning session, A = afternoon session

Men
Date →	26 February	27 February	
Event ↓	A	A	
60 metres		½	F
400 metres	H	F	
800 metres	H	F	
1500 metres		F	
3000 metres	F		
60 metres hurdles		½	F
High jump	F		
Pole vault	F		
Long jump		F	
Triple jump		F	
Shot put		F	
35 lbs Weight throw		F	

Women
Date →	26 February	27 February	
Event ↓	A	A	
60 metres		½	F
400 metres	H	F	
800 metres	H	F	
1500 metres	F		
3000 metres		F	
60 metres hurdles		½	F
High jump		F	
Pole vault		F	
Long jump	F		
Triple jump		F	
Shot put	F		
20 lbs Weight throw		F	

Event schedule
DAY ONE – - SATURDAY, February 26TH
Indoor pentathlon
9:00 AM	W	Pentathlon (60m Hurdles)	Final
9:45 AM	W	Pentathlon (High Jump)	Final
11:25 AM	W	Pentathlon (Shot Put)	Final
12:45 PM	W	Pentathlon (Long Jump)	Final
1:55 PM; 2:16 PM	W	Pentathlon (800m) Group B Group A	Final
Indoor heptathlon
12:00 AM	M	Heptathlon (60m)	Final
12:45 PM	M	Heptathlon (Long Jump)	Final
2:00 PM	M	Heptathlon (Shot Put)	Final
3:30 PM	M	Heptathlon (High Jump)	Final
DAY TWO—SUNDAY, February 27TH
9:30 AM	M	Heptathlon (60m Hurdles)	Final
10:30 AM	M	Heptathlon (Pole Vault)	Final
1:40 PM	M	Heptathlon (1000m)	Final
DAY ONE—SATURDAY, February 26TH CNBC 2:00 – 4:00 PM PT
Track Events
Time (PST)	Men / Women	Event	Division Round
2:04 PM	W	1500m	Final
2:24 PM	M	400m	First round
2:44 PM	W	400m	First round
3:04 PM	M	800m	First round
3:24 PM	W	800m	First round
3:45 PM	M	3000m	Final
Field Events
1:15 PM	M	High Jump	Final
1:25 PM	M	Pole Vault	Final
2:10 PM	W	Long Jump	Final
2:35 PM	W	Shot Put	Final
DAY TWO—SUNDAY, February 27TH CNBC 2:00 – 4:00 PM PT
Track Events
11:00 AM	W	60mH	Semi-finals
11:23 AM	M	60mH	Semi-finals
11:46 AM	W	60m	Semi-finals
12:09 PM	M	60m	Semi-finals
2:04 PM	M	400m	Final – S
2:13 PM	M	400m	Final – F
2:22 PM	W	800m	Final
2:31 PM	M	800m	Final
2:40 PM	W	3000m	Final
2:56 PM	W	400m	Final – S
3:04 PM	W	400m	Final – F
3:13 PM	M	1500m	Final
3:24 PM	W	60mH	Final
3:33 PM	M	60mH	Final
3:42 PM	W	60m	Final
3:51 PM	M	60m	Final
Field Events
11:00 AM	M	35LB Weight Throw	Final
11:20 AM	W	Triple Jump	Final
11:30 PM	M	Triple Jump	Final
1:20 PM	W	High Jump	Final
1:40 PM	W	Pole Vault	Final
2:00 PM	M	Shot Put	Final
2:05 PM	W	20LB Weight Throw	Final
2:10 PM	M	Long Jump	Final

== Entry Standards ==
Events in bold will be contested at the Championships.

Men	Women
60 meters 24-2
6.70	7.30
60 m hurdles 24-2
8.00	8.16
400 meters 20-2
47.00	52.90
800 meters 20-2
(1000 m) 2:23.55	(1000 m) 2:41.50
(800 m) 1:48.75	(800 m) 2:03.00
1500 meters 12-1
(Mile) 3:56.00	(Mile) 4:30.00
(1500 m) 3:40.00	(1500 m) 4:11.00
3000 meters 16-1
(3000 m) 7:51.00	(3000 m) 8:55.00
(5000 m) 13:30.00	(5000 m) 15:30.00
3000 metres race walk 12-1
12:45	14:40
(Mile) 6:25	(Mile) 7:30
(5000 m) 22:00	(5000 m) 24:30
High Jump 16-1
2.15 m (7 ft 1/2 in)	1.85 m (6 ft 3/4 in)
Pole Vault 16-1
5.65 m (18 ft 6 1/4 in)	4.50 m (14 ft 9 in)
Long Jump 16-1
7.60 m (24 ft 11 in)	6.35 m (20 ft 10 in)
Triple Jump 16-1
15.50 m (50 ft 10 in)	13.35 m (43 ft 9 1/2 in)
Shot Put 16-1
19.40 m (63 ft 7 3/4 in)	17.75 m (58 ft 2 3/4 in)
Weight Throw 16-1
20.50 m (67 ft 3 in)	22.35 m (73 ft 3 3/4 in)
Heptathlon / Pentathlon 12-1
5450 pts	4250 pts
Decathlon 7700 pts	Heptathlon 5900 pts

January 1, 2021 – February 13, 2022 window.
