= Destiny Carter =

American track and field athlete

Destiny Carter (born October 9, 1992) is an American track and field athlete. She has competed in a variety of sprint and jumping events. She was runner up at the 2018 USA Indoor Track and Field Championships in the 60 meters. That qualified her to represent the US at the World Indoor Championships.

Prior to that, Carter's best result was leading off the University of Kentucky winning 4 × 100 meters relay team at the 2017 NCAA Championships. Later in 2017 she placed eight in the long jump at the 2017 USA Outdoor Track and Field Championships. At those same championships, she failed to get out of the semi-final round in both the 100 meters and 200 meters. Prior to Kentucky, she competed for Iowa Central Community College leading her team to a victory in the relay at the 2015 NJCAA Championships.

Previously she had run at Danville High School in Danville, Illinois, winning the state championship in the 400 meters her junior year. After a shortened season her senior year, she dropped the sport. She was lured back to school and then track and field when her sister Kimberly decided to attend Iowa Central. After the long layoff, as a 21-year-old, her results were surprising.
