= Ana Carolina Azevedo =

Brazilian sprinter (born 1998)

Ana Azevedo
Personal information
- Full name: Ana Carolina de Jesus Azevedo
- Born: 19 May 1998 (age 28) São Roque, São Paulo, Brazil

Sport
- Sport: Athletics
- Event: 200m
Medal record
Women's athletics
Representing Brazil
Pan American Games
Bronze medal – third place	2023 Santiago	200 m
Pan American Championships
Silver medal – second place	2026 Medellín	100 m
Silver medal – second place	2026 Medellín	4×100 m mixed relay
Bronze medal – third place	2026 Medellín	200 m
Ibero-American Championships
Gold medal – first place	2024 Cuiabá	4 × 100 m relay
Gold medal – first place	2026 Lima	100 m
Gold medal – first place	2026 Lima	200 m
Gold medal – first place	2026 Lima	4×100 m mixed relay
Bronze medal – third place	2024 Cuiabá	200 m
South American Games
Gold medal – first place	2022 Asunción	100 m
Silver medal – second place	2026 Santa Fe	100 m
Bronze medal – third place	2022 Asunción	200 m
Bronze medal – third place	2026 Santa Fe	200 m
Bronze medal – third place	2022 Asunción	4×100 m relay
Bronze medal – third place	2026 Santa Fe	4×100 m relay
South American Championships
Gold medal – first place	2019 Lima	4 × 100 m relay
Gold medal – first place	2021 Guayaquil	4×100 m relay
Gold medal – first place	2023 São Paulo	4 × 100 m relay
Silver medal – second place	2019 Lima	4 × 400 m relay
Bronze medal – third place	2021 Guayaquil	200 m
Bronze medal – third place	2023 São Paulo	200 m
South American Indoor Championships
Gold medal – first place	2025 Cochabamba	60 m
Gold medal – first place	2026 Cochabamba	60 m

Ana Carolina de Jesus Azevedo (born 19 May 1998) is a Brazilian sprinter. She is the South American record holder over 60 metres, both indoors and outdoors.

== Biography ==
In 2020, Azevedo was named Best Female Athlete by the Brazilian Athletics Confederation. Azevedo completed in the 200 metres at the 2020 Summer Olympics, where she ran a time of 23.20 sec in her qualifying heat.

In November 2023, she won a bronze medal in the 200 meters at the Pan American Games held in Santiago, Chile.

She competed in the women's 60 metres at the 2024 World Athletics Indoor Championships in Glasgow and ran a personal best time of 7.50 seconds. She competed at the 2024 Summer Olympics in Paris over 200 metres. She also competed in the 100 metres race at the Games.

She ran a lifetime best of 7.16 seconds to win the gold medal ahead of Colombian Marlet Ospino at the 2025 South American Indoor Championships in Cochabamba in February 2025. In September 2025, she competed in the 100 metres at the 2025 World Championships in Tokyo, Japan.

In 2026, Azevedo recently 7.05 for the 60 metres, a South American record, in an outdoor meeting in São Paulo. In February 2026, she set a new South American indoor record to win the gold medal in the 60 metres in 7.09 seconds at the South American Indoor Championships, bettering the record of Vitória Cristina Rosa from 2022.

Having equaled her personal best in the semi-finals, Azevedo set a 100m championship record and personal best with 11.08 in the final to win the gold medal at the 2026 Ibero-American Championships in Athletics in Peru. Later at the championships, she won further gold medals over 200 metres, and with the Brazilian mixed 4 x 100 metres relay team. Selected for the inaugural 2026 Pan American Championships in Athletics in Medellín, she placed second in the 100 metres final, running 11.16 seconds to finish runner-up to Canadian Sade McCreath. In September, she won the silver medal in the 100 metres at the 2026 South American Games.

== Athletics achievements ==
Information from her World Athletics profile unless otherwise noted.

=== Personal bests ===
Type	Distance	Time (s)	Wind (m/s)	Venue	Date	Notes
Individual events
Indoor	60 metres	7.09	—N/a	Cochabamba, Bolivia	28 February 2026	AR NR
Outdoor	60 metres	7.05	+0.0	São Paulo, Brazil	18 February 2026	AR NR
Outdoor	100 metres	11.08	+0.7	Lima, Peru	29 May 2026	
Outdoor	200 metres	22.66	+1.5	Bragança Paulista, Brazil	26 April 2026	
Outdoor	400 metres	52.70	—N/a	São Bernardo do Campo, Brazil	16 March 2024	
Team events
Outdoor	4 × 100 metres relay	43.46	—N/a	Budapest, Hungary	25 August 2023	
Outdoor	Mixed 4 × 100 metres relay	40.99	—N/a	Lima, Peru	30 May 2026	AR
Outdoor	4 × 400 metres relay	3:35.29	—N/a	Lima, Peru	26 May 2019	

=== International competitions ===
Representing Brazil
Year	Competition	Venue	Position	Event	Time	Notes
2015	World Youth Championships	Cali, Colombia	19th (sf)	100 m	11.95	
2015	World Youth Championships	Cali, Colombia	20th (sf)	200 m	24.46	
2019	World Relays	Yokohama, Japan	4th	4 × 100 m relay	43.75	
2019	South American Championships	Lima, Peru	5th	200 m	24.01	
2019	South American Championships	Lima, Peru	1st	4 × 100 m relay	44.70	
2019	South American Championships	Lima, Peru	2nd	4 × 400 m relay	3:35.29	
2021	World Relays	Chorzów, Poland	—	4 × 100 m relay	DQ	TR17.3.1
2021	South American Championships	Guayaquil, Ecuador	6th	100 m	11.78	
2021	South American Championships	Guayaquil, Ecuador	3rd	200 m	23.87	
2021	South American Championships	Guayaquil, Ecuador	1st	4 × 100 m relay	44.91	
2021	Olympic Games	Tokyo, Japan	25th (h)	200 m	23.20	SB
2022	World Championships	Eugene, United States	34th (h)	200 m	23.45	
2022	South American Games	Asunción, Paraguay	1st	100 m	11.75	
2022	South American Games	Asunción, Paraguay	3rd	200 m	23.43	
2022	South American Games	Asunción, Paraguay	3rd	4 × 100 m relay	45.43	
2023	South American Championships	São Paulo, Brazil	3rd	200 m	23.13	
2023	South American Championships	São Paulo, Brazil	1st	4 × 100 m relay	43.47	
2023	World Championships	Budapest, Hungary	34th (h)	200 m	23.45	
2023	World Championships	Budapest, Hungary	15th (h)	4 × 100 m relay	43.46	SB PB
2023	Pan American Games	Santiago, Chile	4th	100 m	11.58	
2023	Pan American Games	Santiago, Chile	3rd	200 m	23.52	
2023	Pan American Games	Santiago, Chile	5th	4 × 100 m relay	44.67	
2024	World Indoor Championships	Glasgow, United Kingdom	44th (h)	60 m	7.50	PB
2024	World Relays	Nassau, Bahamas	21st (h)	4 × 100 m relay	43.82	
2024	Ibero-American Championships	Cuiabá, Brazil	3rd	200 m	23.30	
2024	Ibero-American Championships	Cuiabá, Brazil	1st	4 × 100 m relay	43.54	
2024	Olympic Games	Paris, France	35th (h)	100 m	11.32	
2024	Olympic Games	Paris, France	37th (h)	200 m	23.37	
2025	South American Indoor Championships	Cochabamba, Bolivia	1st	60 m	7.16	CR
2025	World Indoor Championships	Nanjing, China	25th (h)	60 m	7.31	
2025	South American Championships	Mar del Plata, Argentina	4th	100 m	11.35	
2025	World Championships	Tokyo, Japan	22nd (h)	100 m	11.24	
2026	South American Indoor Championships	Cochabamba, Bolivia	1st	60 m	7.09	AR NR CR
2026	World Indoor Championships	Toruń, Poland	12th (sf)	60 m	7.15	
2026	Ibero-American Championships	Lima, Peru	1st	100 m	11.08	CR
2026	Ibero-American Championships	Lima, Peru	1st	200 m	22.50	
2026	Ibero-American Championships	Lima, Peru	1st	Mixed 4 × 100 m relay	40.99	AR
2026	Pan American Championships	Medellín, Colombia	2nd	100 m	11.16	
2026	Pan American Championships	Medellín, Colombia	3rd	200 m	23.10	
2026	Pan American Championships	Medellín, Colombia	2nd	Mixed 4 × 100 m relay	41.55	
2026	South American Games	Santa Fe, Argentina	2nd	100 m	11.58	
2026	South American Games	Santa Fe, Argentina	3rd	200 m	23.26	
2026	South American Games	Santa Fe, Argentina	3rd	4 × 100 m relay	44.79	

=== National titles ===
She has won fourteen national titles at senior level.

- Brazilian Athletics Championships
  - 100 metres: 2024, 2025, 2026
  - 200 metres: 2020, 2021, 2024, 2026
  - 4 x 100 metres relay: 2018, 2021, 2023, 2024, 2025
  - 4 x 400 metres relay: 2024
  - Mixed 4 x 100 metres relay: 2026
