= Athletics at the 2023 Pan American Games – Women's 200 metres =

Women's 200 metres at the 2023 Pan American Games
- Venue: Julio Martínez National Stadium
- Dates: November 1 – November 2
- Competitors: 14 from 11 nations
- Winning time: 22.74

Medalists
Gold medal	Marileidy Paulino	Dominican Republic
Silver medal	Yunisleidy García	Cuba
Bronze medal	Ana Carolina Azevedo	Brazil

The women's 200 metres competition of the athletics events at the 2023 Pan American Games was held on November 1 - 2 at the Julio Martínez National Stadium of Santiago, Chile.

== Records ==
Prior to this competition, the existing world and Pan American Games records were as follows:

World record	Florence Griffith Joyner (USA)	21.34	Seoul, South Korea	September 29, 1988
Pan American Games record	Shelly-Ann Fraser-Pryce (JAM)	22.43	Lima, Peru	August 9, 2019

== Schedule ==
Date	Time	Round
November 1, 2023	18:49	Semifinal
November 2, 2023	20:02	Final

== Results ==
All times shown are in seconds.

KEY:	q	Fastest non-qualifiers	Q	Qualified	NR	National record	PB	Personal best	SB	Seasonal best	DQ	Disqualified

=== Semifinal ===
Qualification: First 3 in each heat (Q) and next 2 fastest (q) qualified for the final.
Wind:
Heat 1: +0.9 m/s, Heat 2: +0.2 m/s

Rank	Heat	Name	Nationality	Time	Notes
1	2	Marileidy Paulino	Dominican Republic	23.04	Q
2	1	Ana Carolina Azevedo	Brazil	23.61	Q
3	2	Anahí Suárez	Ecuador	23.63	Q
4	1	Reyare Thomas	Trinidad and Tobago	23.76	Q
5	1	Cecilia Tamayo-Garza	Mexico	23.79	Q
6	1	Aimara Nazareno	Ecuador	23.90	q
7	1	La'nica Locker	Antigua and Barbuda	23.94	q
8	2	Yunisleidy García	Cuba	23.96	Q
9	2	Isidora Jiménez	Chile	24.00	
10	1	Enis Pérez	Cuba	24.07	
11	2	Cristal Cuervo	Panama	24.13	
12	2	Naomi London	Saint Lucia	24.33	
	1	Martha Méndez	Dominican Republic	DNF	
	2	Lina Licona	Colombia	DQ	

=== Final ===
The results were as follows

Wind: +0.0 m/s

Rank	Lane	Name	Nationality	Time	Notes
1st place, gold medalist(s)	6	Marileidy Paulino	Dominican Republic	22.74	
2nd place, silver medalist(s)	3	Yunisleidy García	Cuba	23.33	
3rd place, bronze medalist(s)	7	Ana Carolina Azevedo	Brazil	23.52	
4	5	Anahí Suárez	Ecuador	23.67	
5	4	Reyare Thomas	Trinidad and Tobago	23.79	
6	8	Cecilia Tamayo-Garza	Mexico	23.93	
7	1	La'nica Locker	Antigua and Barbuda	24.28	
	2	Aimara Nazareno	Ecuador	DQ	
