= Lotta Kemppinen =

Finnish sprinter (born 1998)

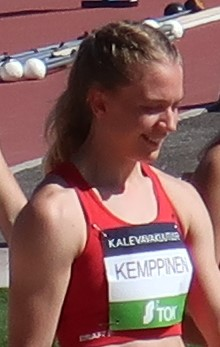

Personal information
- Born: 1 April 1998 (age 28) Helsinki, Finland

Sport
- Country: Finland
- Sport: Athletics
- Event: Sprinting
Medal record
Women's sprinting
Representing Finland
European Indoor Championships
Silver medal – second place	2021 Toruń	60 m

Lotta Kaarina Kemppinen (born 1 April 1998) is a Finnish sprinter. She won the silver medal in the women's 60 metres at the 2021 European Athletics Indoor Championships held in Toruń, Poland.

== International competitions ==
Representing Finland
Year	Competition	Venue	Position	Event	Result	Notes
2021	European Indoor Championships	Toruń, Poland	2nd	60 m	7.22	
2022	World Indoor Championships	Belgrade, Serbia	15th (sf)	60 m	7.19	
2024	World Indoor Championships	Glasgow, United Kingdom	29th (h)	60 m	7.28	
2024	European Championships	Rome, Italy	22nd (sf)	100 m	11.44	
2024	European Championships	Rome, Italy	10th (h)	4 × 100 m relay	43.68	
2024	Olympic Games	Paris, France	54th (h)	100 m	11.56	
2026	World Indoor Championships	Toruń, Poland	15th (sf)	60 m	7.19	
2026	European Championships	Birmingham, United Kingdom	17th (sf)	100 m	11.29	
2026	European Championships	Birmingham, United Kingdom	11th (sf)	4 × 100 m relay	43.78	
