= 2018 IAAF World Indoor Championships – Women's 60 metres =

Women's 60 metres at the 2018 IAAF World Indoor Championships
- Venue: Arena Birmingham
- Dates: 2 March
- Competitors: 47 from 35 nations
- Winning time: 6.97

Medalists
gold medal	Murielle Ahouré	Ivory Coast
silver medal	Marie-Josée Ta Lou	Ivory Coast
bronze medal	Mujinga Kambundji	Switzerland

Video on YouTube Official Video

The women's 60 metres at the 2018 IAAF World Indoor Championships took place on 2 March 2018.

== Summary ==
Carolle Zahi led the opening heats with her personal best of 7.11. Murielle Ahouré showed her cards in the semi-final round, her 7.01 .06 faster than the top sprinter in the world the last couple of seasons, Elaine Thompson. 7.01 would have been fast enough to win the final.

In the final, Ahouré blasted out of the blocks. With short quick, strides she had opened up a metre lead over Zahi, 20 metres into the race. The rest of the contenders formed a line across the track, only Remona Burchell was beaten at this point. The first to run down Zahi was returning silver medalist Dafne Schippers as Zahi faded. Schippers also faded, the battle in the center of the track was between Mujinga Kambundji and Marie-Josée Ta Lou, with Thompson inches behind. With her pursuers in full flight, Ahouré's lead shrunk slightly, but was insurmountable. Ta Lou and Kambundji crossed the line together, Ta Lou getting the silver by .005 over Kambundji.

It was the first gold medal for the Ivory Coast, made more remarkable by the fact that it was a one-two sweep for the nation.

== Results ==
=== Heats ===
The heats were started at 10:35.

Rank	Heat	Lane	Name	Nationality	Time	Notes
1	4	5	Carolle Zahi	France	7.11	Q, PB
2	5	8	Murielle Ahouré	Ivory Coast	7.12	Q
3	4	4	Mujinga Kambundji	Switzerland	7.15	Q
4	2	5	Marie-Josée Ta Lou	Ivory Coast	7.17	Q
5	5	5	Asha Philip	Great Britain	7.18	Q
6	6	4	Tatjana Pinto	Germany	7.18	Q
7	3	3	Dafne Schippers	Netherlands	7.19	Q
8	6	2	Remona Burchell	Jamaica	7.19	Q
9	2	2	Elaine Thompson	Jamaica	7.20	Q
10	1	8	Ezinne Okparaebo	Norway	7.22	Q
11	1	5	Michelle-Lee Ahye	Trinidad and Tobago	7.23	Q
12	2	4	Anna Kiełbasińska	Poland	7.23	Q, =PB
13	3	8	Carina Horn	South Africa	7.23	Q
14	3	5	Liang Xiaojing	China	7.24	Q
15	5	1	Destiny Carter	United States	7.24	Q
16	6	1	Ewa Swoboda	Poland	7.24	Q
17	6	3	Anna Bongiorni	Italy	7.24	q, PB
18	6	5	Kelly-Ann Baptiste	Trinidad and Tobago	7.25	q, SB
19	3	4	Crystal Emmanuel	Canada	7.26	q, SB
20	1	3	Javianne Oliver	United States	7.29	Q
21	3	7	Klára Seidlová	Czech Republic	7.30	q
22	1	2	Bianca Williams	Great Britain	7.31	q
23	5	3	Ajla Del Ponte	Switzerland	7.31	q
24	2	6	Rosângela Santos	Brazil	7.32	
25	4	6	Gayon Evans	Jamaica	7.33	Q
26	4	8	Jamile Samuel	Netherlands	7.34	
27	4	3	Hrystyna Stuy	Ukraine	7.34	
28	1	4	Wei Yongli	China	7.35	
29	2	1	Amy Foster	Ireland	7.35	
30	6	6	Andrea Purica	Venezuela	7.36	
31	1	6	Krystsina Tsimanouskaya	Belarus	7.37	
32	2	3	Isidora Jiménez	Chile	7.38	
33	3	1	Lorène Bazolo	Portugal	7.39	
34	5	7	Vitoria Cristina Rosa	Brazil	7.39	
35	5	2	Rafailia Spanoudaki-Hatziriga	Greece	7.40	
36	5	4	Mathilde Kramer	Denmark	7.43	PB
37	1	7	Ciara Neville	Ireland	7.47	
38	6	7	Flings Owusu-Agyapong	Ghana	7.49	
39	4	7	Tahesia Harrigan-Scott	British Virgin Islands	7.50	
40	2	7	Jolene Jacobs	Namibia	7.67	
41	4	1	Yasmin Kwadwo	Germany	7.68	
42	3	6	Loi Im Lan	Macau	7.69	NR
43	2	8	Mazoon Al-Alawi	Oman	7.78	NR
44	3	2	Cristina Llovera	Andorra	7.84	
45	5	6	Patricia Taea	Cook Islands	7.90	NR
46	4	2	Kendi Rosales	Honduras	8.18	PB
47	6	8	Zarinae Sapong	Northern Mariana Islands	8.54	PB

=== Semifinal ===
The semifinals were started at 18:50.

Rank	Heat	Lane	Name	Nationality	Time	Notes
1	1	3	Murielle Ahouré	Ivory Coast	7.01	Q
2	1	6	Elaine Thompson	Jamaica	7.07	Q, SB
3	2	5	Marie-Josée Ta Lou	Ivory Coast	7.08	Q
4	1	5	Dafne Schippers	Netherlands	7.09	q, SB
5	1	8	Javianne Oliver	United States	7.10	
6	3	3	Mujinga Kambundji	Switzerland	7.10	Q
7	1	4	Asha Philip	Great Britain	7.13	
8	2	4	Remona Burchell	Jamaica	7.15	Q
8	2	6	Michelle-Lee Ahye	Trinidad and Tobago	7.15	Q, SB
10	3	6	Carolle Zahi	France	7.17	Q
11	3	4	Carina Horn	South Africa	7.18	
12	2	3	Tatjana Pinto	Germany	7.18	
13	3	5	Ezinne Okparaebo	Norway	7.19	
14	1	2	Kelly-Ann Baptiste	Trinidad and Tobago	7.21	SB
15	3	8	Anna Kiełbasińska	Poland	7.23	=PB
16	2	8	Ewa Swoboda	Poland	7.25	
17	3	1	Bianca Williams	Great Britain	7.26	PB
18	2	1	Crystal Emmanuel	Canada	7.27	
19	2	7	Destiny Carter	United States	7.28	
20	3	2	Anna Bongiorni	Italy	7.30	
21	1	7	Liang Xiaojing	China	7.30	
22	2	2	Klára Seidlová	Czech Republic	7.35	
23	1	1	Ajla Del Ponte	Switzerland	7.40	
	3	7	Gayon Evans	Jamaica	DNS	

=== Final ===
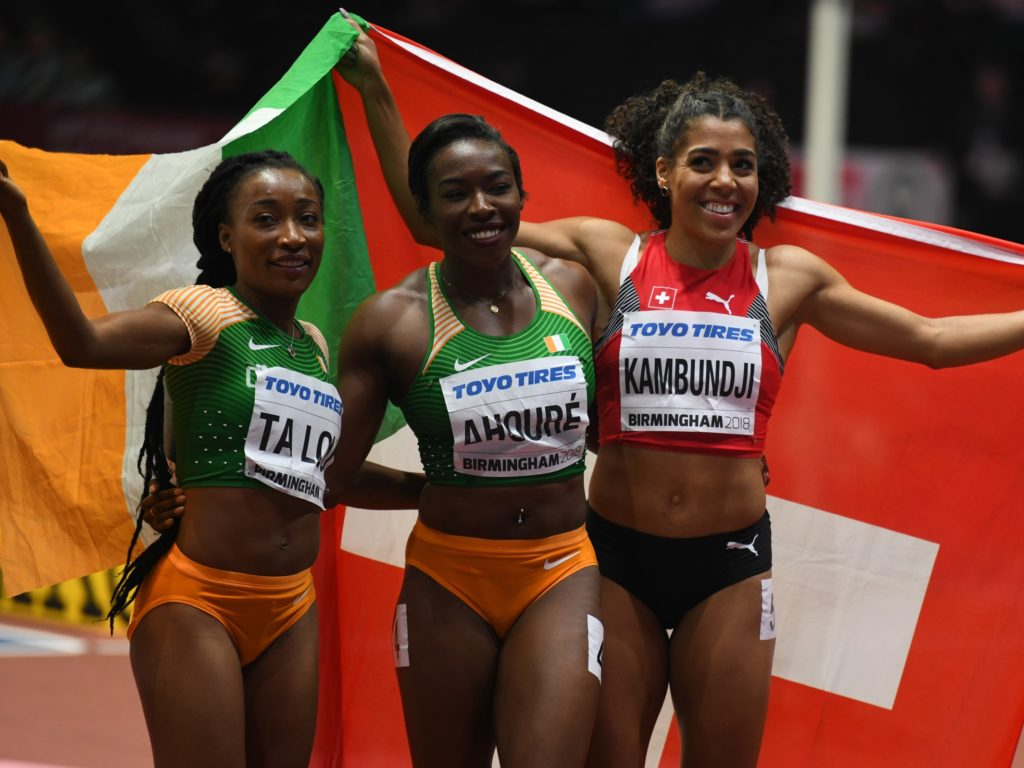
The medallists; Murielle Ahouré borrowed an Irish flag from a spectator and reversed due to the two flag's similarity

The final was started at 21:42.

Rank	Lane	Name	Nationality	Time	Notes
1st place, gold medalist(s)	4	Murielle Ahouré	Ivory Coast	6.97	WL
2nd place, silver medalist(s)	6	Marie-Josée Ta Lou	Ivory Coast	7.05	PB
3rd place, bronze medalist(s)	5	Mujinga Kambundji	Switzerland	7.05	
4	3	Elaine Thompson	Jamaica	7.08	
5	2	Dafne Schippers	Netherlands	7.10	
6	7	Michelle-Lee Ahye	Trinidad and Tobago	7.13	SB
7	1	Carolle Zahi	France	7.19	
8	8	Remona Burchell	Jamaica	7.50	

==== Irish Flag ====
When Murielle Ahouré celebrated winning the final, she borrowed an Irish flag from a spectator and reversed it due to the two flag's similarity.
