= Remona Burchell =

Jamaican sprinter (born 1991)

Personal information
- Nationality: Jamaican
- Born: 15 September 1991 (age 34) Savanna-la-Mar

Sport
- Country: Jamaica
- Sport: Athletics
- Event: 100 metres
- College team: Alabama Crimson Tide
Medal record
Women's athletics
Representing Jamaica
Olympic Games
Gold medal – first place	2020 Tokyo	4 × 100 m relay
World Championships
Silver medal – second place	2022 Eugene	4 × 100 m relay
Commonwealth Games
Silver medal – second place	2022 Birmingham	4 × 100 m relay

Remona Burchell (born 15 September 1991) is a Jamaican sprinter. While running for the University of Alabama, she became a three time NCAA Champion, winning the 60 meters at the NCAA Indoor Championships in 2014 and 2015. She set her 100 meter personal record of 11.03 seconds in a qualifying meet to get to the 2014 NCAA Outdoor Championships, where she won the championship (running 11.17 seconds into a severe headwind).

Prior to running in the United States, she ran for Cambridge high school and later Herbert Morrison technical High School, both in Jamaica.

She represented Jamaica at the 2018 World Indoor Championships.
