= Claudia Payton =

Swedish sprinter

Personal information
- Born: 13 April 1998 (age 28)

Sport
- Sport: Athletics
- Event: 100 metres

Claudia Payton (born 13 April 1998) is a Swedish sprinter. She represented her country at the 2021 European Indoor Championships finishing eighth in the final.

== International competitions ==
Year	Competition	Venue	Position	Event	Notes
Representing Sweden
2017	European U20 Championships	Grosseto, Italy	22nd (sf)	100 m	12.13
2018	European Championships	Berlin, Germany	15th (h)	4 × 100 m relay	44.51
2019	European U23 Championships	Gävle, Sweden	12th (sf)	100 m	11.87
2019	European U23 Championships	Gävle, Sweden	11th (h)	4 × 100 m relay	45.17
2021	European Indoor Championships	Toruń, Poland	8th	60 m	7.32
2022	World Indoor Championships	Belgrade, Serbia	13th (h)	60 m	7.21^{1}

^{1} Disqualified in the semifinals

== Personal bests ==
Outdoor

- 100 metres – 11.48 (+2.0 m/s, Skara 2020)
- 200 metres – 24.65 (+1.6 m/s, Mölndal 2018)

Indoor

- 60 metres – 7.26 (Toruń 2021)
