= Marybeth Sant-Price =

American track and field athlete (born 1995)

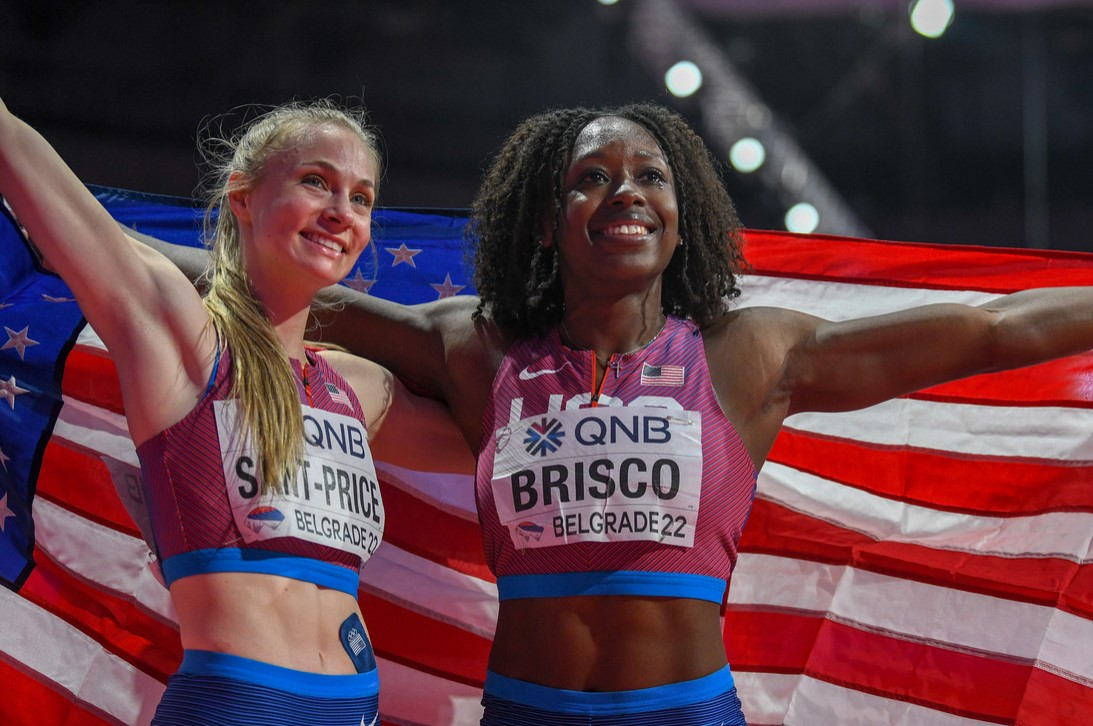
- Sant-Price in 2022

Personal information
- Nationality: American
- Born: April 6, 1995 (age 31)
- Height: 1.57 m (5 ft 2 in)

Sport
- Country: United States
- Sport: Track and field
- Event(s): 60 metres 100 metres 200 metres
- College team: Colorado State University '19; University of Oregon '17
- Turned pro: 2019

Achievements and titles
- Personal best(s): 100 m: 10.95(2022) 60 m: 7.04 200 m: 23.46 (2019)
Medal record
Women's athletics
Representing the United States
World Indoor Championships
Bronze medal – third place	2022 Belgrade	60 m

Marybeth Sant-Price (born April 6, 1995) is an American track and field sprinter. She holds personal records of 10.95 over 100m and 7.04 over 60 metres.

Sant-Price won a bronze medal at the 2022 World Athletics Indoor Championships – Women's 60 metres in Belgrade, Serbia.

== Professional ==
Year	Competition	Venue	Position	Event	Notes
Representing the United States
2022	World Indoor Championships	Belgrade, Serbia	3rd	60 meters	7.04

Year	Competition	Venue	Position	Event	Result
Unattached
2023	USATF Outdoor Track and Field Championships	Eugene, Oregon	26th	100 meters	11.29
2023	USATF Indoor Track and Field Championships	Albuquerque, New Mexico	2nd	60 meters	7.09
2022	USATF Outdoor Track and Field Championships	Eugene, Oregon	11th	100 meters	11.01
2022	USATF Indoor Track and Field Championships	Spokane, Washington	2nd	60 meters	7.08
2021
2020	USA Indoor Track and Field Championships	Albuquerque, New Mexico	6th	60 meters	7.25

== Personal bests ==
Outdoor

- 100 m: 10.95 (2021)
- 200 m: 23.46 (2019)

Indoor

- 60 m: 7.04 (2022)
- 200 m: 23.47 (2019)

== NCAA ==
Marybeth Sant-Price is a 3-time NCAA Division I All-American, Mountain West Conference champion, 5-time All-Mountain West Conference, & 2-time Pac-12 Conference.

Year	Competition	Venue	Position	Event	Result
Representing Colorado State Rams track and field
2019	NCAA Division I Outdoor Track and Field Championships	University of Texas	44th	100 meters	11.56
2019	NCAA Division I Outdoor Track and Field Championships	University of Texas	16th	4 × 100 metres relay	43.92
2019	NCAA Division I Outdoor Track and Field Championships	University of Texas	67th	200 meters	23.89
2019	Mountain West Conference; Outdoor Track and Field Championship	California State University, Fresno	2nd	100 meters	11.41
2019	Mountain West Conference; Outdoor Track and Field Championship	California State University, Fresno	3rd	200 meters	23.46
2019	Mountain West Conference; Outdoor Track and Field Championship	California State University, Fresno	1st	4 × 100 metres relay	44.12
2019	NCAA Division I Indoor Track and Field Championships	Birmingham CrossPlex	10th	60 meters	7.34
2019	Mountain West Conference; Indoor Track and Field Championship	Albuquerque, New Mexico	2nd	60 meters	7.28
2019	Mountain West Conference; Indoor Track and Field Championship	Albuquerque, New Mexico	8th	200 meters	DQ in Final
2018	NCAA Division I Outdoor Track and Field Championships	California State University, Sacramento	42nd	4 × 100 metres relay	45.71
2018	Mountain West Conference; Outdoor Track and Field Championship	California State University, Fresno	10th	100 meters	11.71
2018	Mountain West Conference; Outdoor Track and Field Championship	California State University, Fresno	17th	200 meters	24.75
2018	Mountain West Conference; Outdoor Track and Field Championship	California State University, Fresno	3rd	4 × 100 metres relay	45.01
2018	Mountain West Conference; Indoor Track and Field Championship	Albuquerque, New Mexico	6th	60 meters	7.50
2018	Mountain West Conference; Indoor Track and Field Championship	Albuquerque, New Mexico	10th	200 meters	24.59
Representing Oregon Ducks track and field
2015	NCAA Division I Outdoor Track and Field Championships	University of Oregon	47th	100 meters	11.57
2015	NCAA Division I Outdoor Track and Field Championships	University of Oregon	8th	4 × 100 metres relay	DQ in Final
2015	Pac-12 Conference; Outdoor Track and Field Championship	University of California, Los Angeles	11th	100 meters	11.73
2015	Pac-12 Conference; Outdoor Track and Field Championship	University of California, Los Angeles	26th	200 meters	24.81
2015	Pac-12 Conference; Outdoor Track and Field Championship	University of California, Los Angeles	2nd	4 × 100 metres relay	43.65
2015	Mountain Pacific Sports Federation; Indoor Track and Field Championship	University of Washington	10th	60 meters	7.44
2014	NCAA Division I Outdoor Track and Field Championships	University of Arkansas	48th	100 meters	FS in QF
2014	Pac-12 Conference; Outdoor Track and Field Championship	Washington State University	5th	100 meters	11.71
2014	Pac-12 Conference; Outdoor Track and Field Championship	Washington State University	5th	200 meters	24.32
2014	Pac-12 Conference; Outdoor Track and Field Championship	Washington State University	2nd	4 × 100 metres relay	43.77
2014	Mountain Pacific Sports Federation; Indoor Track and Field Championship	University of Washington	11th	60 meters	7.50

== High school ==
Year	Competition	Venue	Position	Event	Result
Representing Valor Christian High School
2013	Colorado High School Activities Association; 4A Track and Field Championship	Lakewood, Colorado	1st	100 meters	11.57
2013	Colorado High School Activities Association; 4A Track and Field Championship	Lakewood, Colorado	1st	200 meters	23.61
2012	Colorado High School Activities Association; 4A Track and Field Championship	Lakewood, Colorado	1st	100 meters	11.69
2012	Colorado High School Activities Association; 4A Track and Field Championship	Lakewood, Colorado	1st	200 meters	24.65
2011	Colorado High School Activities Association; 4A Track and Field Championship	Lakewood, Colorado	2nd	100 meters	12.07
2011	Colorado High School Activities Association; 4A Track and Field Championship	Lakewood, Colorado	3rd	200 meters	24.82
