= Mikiah Brisco =

American track and field athlete (b. 1996)

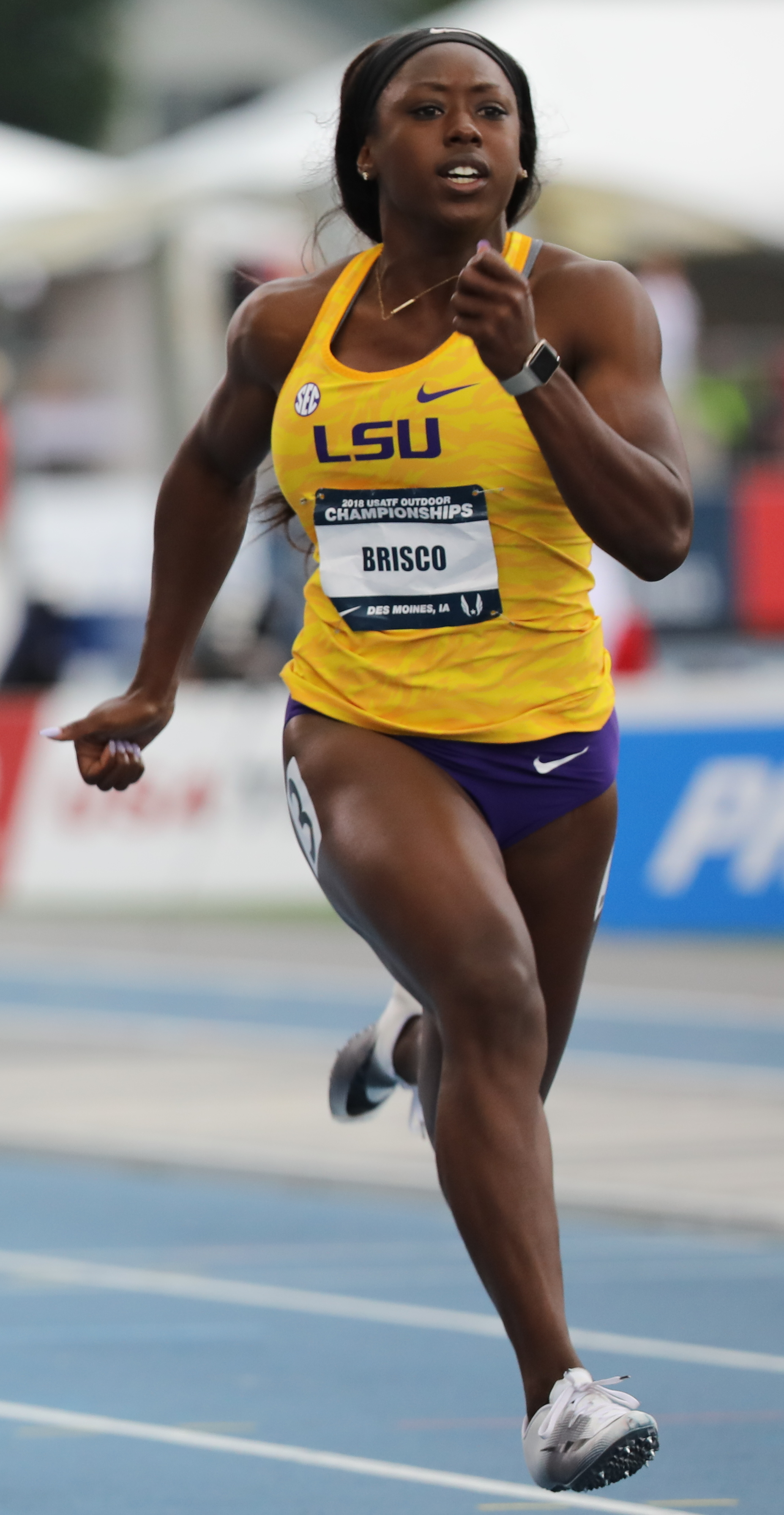
- Brisco at the 2018 national championships

Personal information
- Nationality: American
- Born: July 14, 1996 (age 30) Baton Rouge, Louisiana
- Height: 1.68 m (5 ft 6 in)

Sport
- Country: United States
- Sport: Track and field
- Events: 60 metres 100 metres 60 metres hurdles 100 metres hurdles 200 metres
- College team: Louisiana State University
- Turned pro: 2018

Achievements and titles
- Personal bests: 100 m: 10.96 (2017); 200 m: 22.59 (2018); 100 m hurdles: 12.85 (2017)
Medal record
Women's athletics
Representing the United States
World Indoor Championships
Silver medal – second place	2022 Belgrade	60 m
World Relays
Gold medal – first place	2019 Yokohama	4×100 m relay
World Youth Championships
Bronze medal – third place	2013 Donetsk	100 m hurdles
Pan American U20 Championships
Gold medal – first place	2015 Edmonton	4×100 m relay

Mikiah Janee Brisco (born July 14, 1996) is an American female track and field sprinter. She holds personal records of 10.96 seconds for the 100-meter dash and 22.59 seconds for the 200-meter dash. She also previously competed in the 100-meter hurdles, having a best of 12.85 seconds. She was a gold medallist at the 2019 IAAF World Relays and was the 60-meter dash national champion in 2020.

She is a multiple American collegiate national champion, taking the individual 100 m title in 2017 and the 4 × 100-meter relay title with the LSU Tigers track and field team in 2016 and 2018. In her youth she was the 100 m hurdles bronze medallist at the 2013 World Youth Championships in Athletics and won hurdles and relay gold medals at the 2015 Pan American Junior Athletics Championships.

Brisco won a silver medal at the 2022 World Athletics Indoor Championships – Women's 60 metres in Belgrade, Serbia.

== National titles ==
- USA Indoor Track and Field Championships
  - 60 m: 2020, 2022
- NCAA Division I Women's Outdoor Track and Field Championships
  - 100 m: 2017
  - 4 × 100 m relay: 2016, 2018

== Personal bests ==
Outdoor

- 100 m: 10.96 (2017)
- 200 m: 22.59 (2018)
- 100 m hurdles: 12.85 (2017)

Indoor

- 60 m: 6.99 (2022)
- 200 m: 22.81 (2018)
- 60 m hurdles: 7.98 (2017)
- Long jump: 5.41 m (2014)
