= Katarzyna Sokólska =

Polish sprinter

Personal information
- Born: 23 August 1993 (age 32) Białystok, Poland
- Height: 172 cm (5 ft 8 in) (2016)
- Weight: 57 kg (126 lb) (2016)

Sport
- Sport: Athletics
- Event(s): 60 metres, 100 metres, 200 metres, 4 × 100 metres relay
- Club: CWZS Zawisza Bydgoszcz SL
- Coached by: Jacek Lewandowski
Medal record
Women's athletics
Representing Poland
European Team Championships
Silver medal – second place	2021 Chorzów	4×100 m relay
World Athletics Relays
Silver medal – second place	2021 Chorzów	4×100 m relay

Katarzyna Sokólska (born 23 August 1993) is a Polish athlete. She competed at the 2021 World Athletics Relays, winning the silver medal in the women's 4 × 100 metres relay event.

She was selected to represent Poland at the 2016 Summer Olympics in the women's 4 × 100 metres relay event.
