= Javianne Oliver =

American sprinter

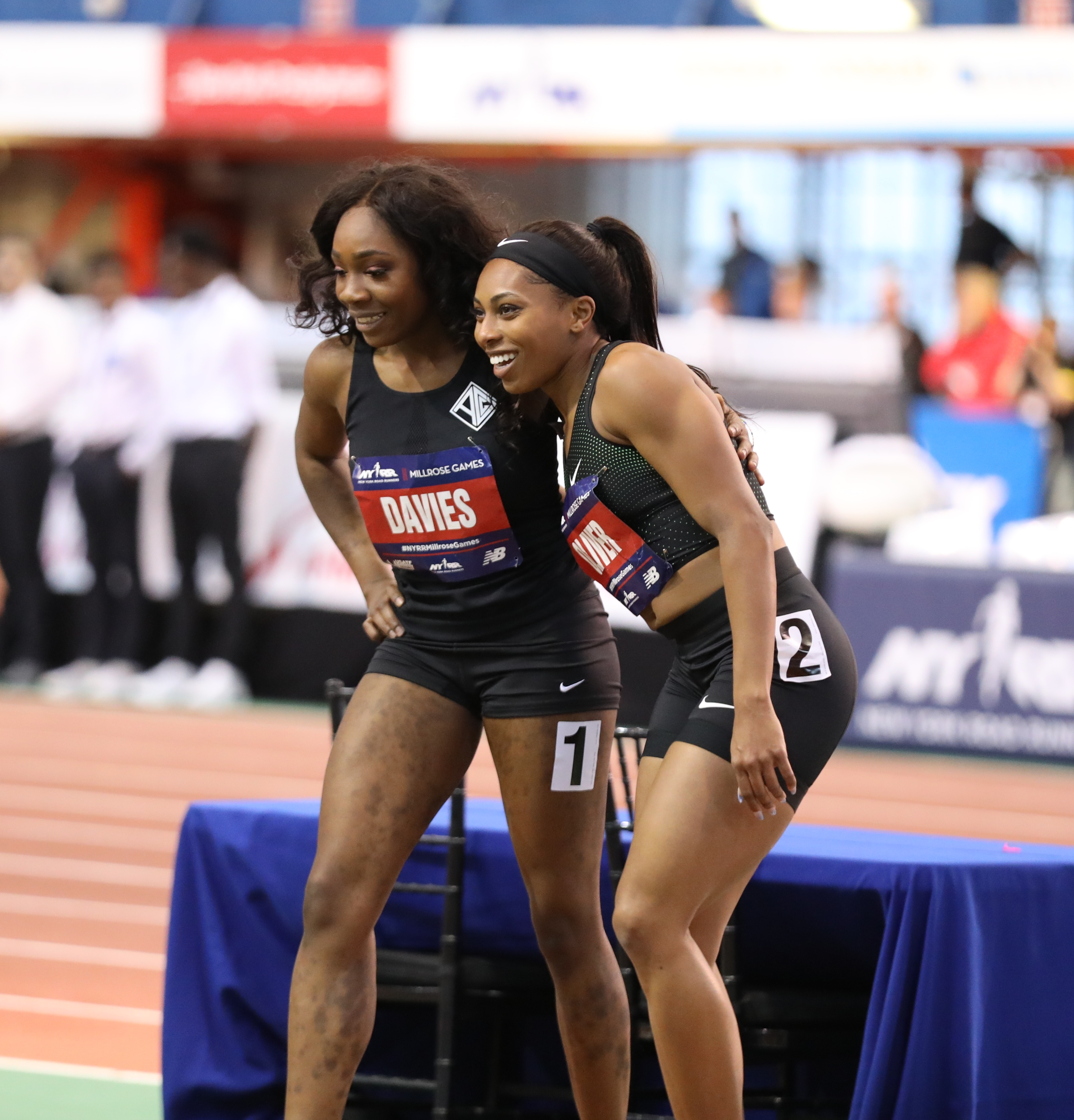
- Oliver with Thelma Davies at the 2019 Millrose Games

Personal information
- Born: December 26, 1994 (age 31) Monroe, Georgia, U.S.

Sport
- Sport: Track and field
- Event: Sprints
- College team: Kentucky Wildcats (2014–2017)
Medal record
Women's track and field
Representing the United States
Olympic Games
Silver medal – second place	2020 Tokyo	4×100 m relay
NACAC Championships
Gold medal – first place	2022 Freeport	4×100 m relay
Representing Kentucky Wildcats/ Southeastern Conference
NCAA Indoor Track and Field Championships
Silver medal – second place	2017 College Station	60 m
NCAA Outdoor Track and Field Championships
Silver medal – second place	2015 Eugene	Team 2nd place

Javianne Oliver (born December 26, 1994) is an American female track and field sprinter.

Oliver finished second in the 60 meters at the 2017 NCAA Division I Indoor Track and Field Championships for the University of Kentucky.

Oliver won the 60 meters at the 2018 USA Indoor Track and Field Championships to qualify for the 2018 IAAF World Indoor Championships. Her time of 7.02 was the top time that season in the world. She returned to the 2020 USA Track & Field Indoor Championships to finish second to Mikiah Brisco, qualifying to her second World Championships in the process. Oliver also won the 2020 US Olympic Trials with a time of 10.99.

== Professional ==
Oliver signed with Nike, Inc in 2018 after winning US 60 meters title.

Year	Competition	Venue	Position	Event	Notes
USA National Championships
2022	USA Outdoor Track and Field Championships	Eugene, Oregon	7th	100 metres	10.94
2021	USA Track and Field Olympic Trials	Eugene, Oregon	1st	100 metres	10.99
2020	USA Track and Field Indoor Championships	Albuquerque, New Mexico	2nd	60 metres	7.08
2018	2018 USA Outdoor Track and Field Championships	Des Moines, Iowa	25th	100 metres	DNS
2018	USA Track and Field Indoor Championships	Albuquerque, New Mexico	1st	60 metres	7.02

=== Major competitions ===
Representing the United States
Year	Competition	Venue	Position	Event	Time	Wind (m/s)	Notes
2022	2022 NACAC Championships	Freeport, Bahamas	1st	4×100 meters relay	42.35		
2021	Olympic Games	Tokyo, Japan	13th	100 m	11.08	–0.2	
2021	Olympic Games	Tokyo, Japan	2nd	4 × 100 m relay	41.45		
2021	Prefontaine Classic	Eugene, Oregon	2nd	100 m	10.96	+0.9	PB
2018	2018 IAAF World Indoor Championships	Birmingham, United Kingdom	9th	60 metres	7.10		
