= Hanae Aoyama =

Japanese sprinter (born 2002)

Personal information
- Born: 26 August 2002 (age 23) Osaka, Japan
- Height: 167 cm (5 ft 6 in)

Sport
- Country: Japan
- Sport: Athletics
- Event: 100 metres

Hanae Aoyama (青山華依, born 26 August 2002) is a Japanese athlete. She competed in the women's 4 × 100 metres relay event at the 2020 Summer Olympics.
