= Ami Saito =

Japanese sprinter (born 1999)

Personal information
- Nationality: Japanese
- Born: 26 August 1999 (age 26) Takahashi, Japan

Sport
- Sport: Athletics
- Event: 100 metres

Achievements and titles
- Olympic finals: 2020 Summer Olympics

Ami Saito (齋藤 愛美, Saitō Ami, born 26 August 1999) is a Japanese athlete. She competed in the women's 4 × 100 metres relay event at the 2020 Summer Olympics.
