= Tristan Evelyn =

Barbadian athlete (born 1998)

Personal information
- Nationality: Barbadian
- Born: 25 January 1998 (age 28)

Sport
- Sport: Track and Field
- Event(s): 100m, 200m

Achievements and titles
- Personal best(s): 60 meters: 7.10 (2024, NR); 100 meters: 11.14 (2021, NR); 200 meters: 23.18 (2022)

Tristan Cadija Evelyn (born 25 January 1998) is a Barbadian Olympic sprinter.

A former silver medalist at the CARIFTA Games and a student of the University of Houston, Evelyn won both the Women's 60m and the 200m at the American Athletic Conference Indoor Track and Field Championships in 2020.

Evelyn clocked a new national record time of 11.14 seconds (wind 2.0 m/s) to win gold in the women's 100 metres final at the American Athletic Conference Championship. This time also secured her place at the rescheduled 2020 Tokyo Olympics where she competed in the heats. The previous record was 11.26 seconds set by Shakera Reece in 2011. She also holds the Barbadian indoor 200m national record with a time of 23.16.

She reached the semi-finals of the women's 60 metres at the 2024 World Athletics Indoor Championships in Glasgow. She competed in the 100 metres at the 2024 Paris Olympics.

Evelyn competed in the 2026 Enhanced Games as a non-enhanced (drug-free) athlete. She won the 100m competition with a time of 11.25 seconds and $250,000 in prize money. Evelyn said her clean victory without performance-enhancing drugs proved than "more than just chemistry" contributed to competitive athleticism.
