= Mathilde Kramer =

Danish sprinter

Personal information
- Full name: Mathilde Uldall Kramer
- Nationality: Danish
- Born: 15 March 1993 (age 33)

Sport
- Sport: Athletics
- Event: Sprinting

Mathilde Uldall Kramer (born 15 March 1993) is a Danish athlete. She competed in the women's 60 metres at the 2018 IAAF World Indoor Championships and in the 4 x 100 metres relay at the 2020 Olympic Games, where her relay team set a Danish national record.

== Career ==
Competing in Malmö in January 2017, she ran 7.54 seconds for the 60 metres, the fastest by a Danish woman over that distance for over 15 years. In January 2019, she lowered the Danish national record to 7.36 seconds for the distance. She competed at the 2018 IAAF World Indoor Championships over 60 metres, in Birmingham, England.

She ran for Denmark in the 4 × 100 metres relay at the delayed 2020 Summer Olympics, in Tokyo, Japan, where they finished seventh in their heat and running Astrid Glenner-Frandsen, Ida Karstoft and Emma Beiter Bomme, broke the Danish national record with a time of 43.51 seconds.

She won the 2022 Danish Athletics Championships 100 metres race in 11.64 seconds, in Aalborg, in June 2022. She ran 11.58 seconds for the 100 metres at the 2022 European Athletics Championships in Munich, Germany, but it was not enough to qualify for the semi-finals.

She competed as a member of the Daniah team at the 2023 European Athletics Team Championships in Silesia, Poland in June 2023. She finished in eighth place in her 100 metres race and ran as path of the Danish 4 x 100 metres relay team which finished in second place in their division, qualifying for the following year's World Relay Championships.

She ran as part of the Danish 4 × 100 m relay team at the 2024 World Relays Championships in Nassau, Bahamas. She was also selected to run in the sprint relays at the 2024 European Athletics Championships in Rome in June 2024.
