= Ida Karstoft =

Danish sprinter (born 1995)

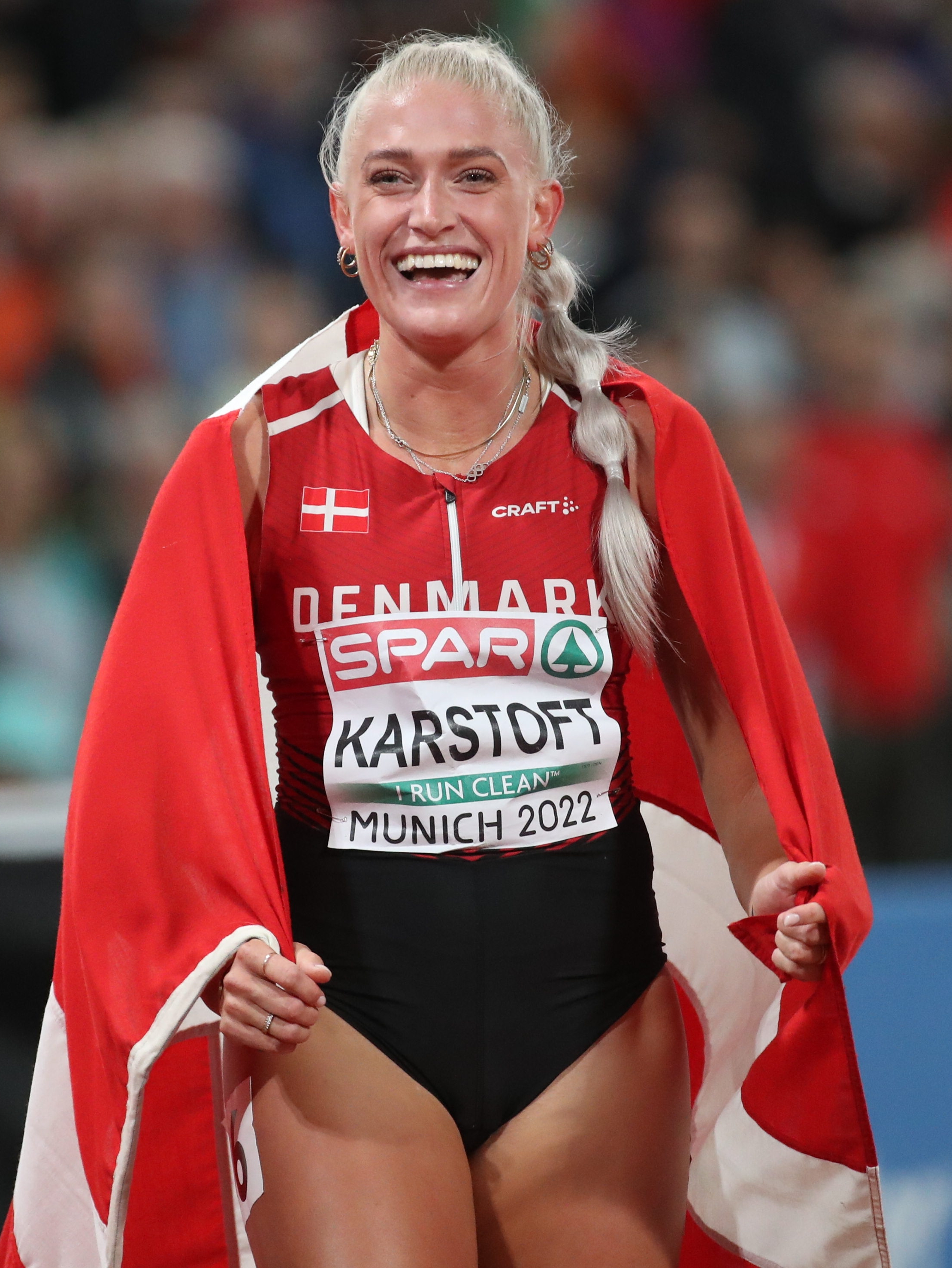
- Ida Karstoft at 2022 European Athletics Championships

Personal information
- Nationality: Danish
- Born: 29 October 1995 (age 30)

Sport
- Sport: Athletics
- Event: Sprinting
Medal record
Women's athletics
Representing Denmark
European Championships
Bronze medal – third place	2022 Munich	200 m

Ida Kathrine Karstoft (born 29 October 1995) is a Danish athlete who competes as a sprinter. She won the bronze medal in the 200 metres at the 2022 European Championships. Formerly a footballer, she played for Brøndby IF and the Denmark national women's football team.

== Football career ==
She started her sporting career as a football player in the Danish league for Brøndby IF, where she played for eighteen months, and for whom she featured in the Champions league. She was also capped by the Denmark national women's football team prior to being contacted by an athletics coach in 2016, whereafter she transitioned to sprinting, and in 2017 she began focusing on athletics fully instead.

== Athletics career ==
Karstoft had only participated in athletics competitions for a few months before she was selected to represent the Danish national athletics team in the 200 metres race and the sprint relay team. She competed in the women's 4 × 100 metres relay event at the 2019 World Athletics Championships.

She was a member of the Danish team at the delayed 2020 Olympic Games in Tokyo, Japan in 2021, where she represented Denmark in the women's 4 x 100 metres relay. Alongside Astrid Glenner-Frandsen, Emma Beiter Bomme and Mathilde Kramer, the Danish team broke the Danish national record with a time of 43.51 seconds.

In 2022, she became the Danish national record holder in both 100 metres and 200 metres, improving her 200 metres record to 22.76 seconds and running the 100 metres in 11.32 seconds at the Copenhagen Open. Karstoft then won the 200 metres at the 2022 Bislett Games in Oslo, part of the 2022 Diamond League, in 22.73 seconds. She then won the bronze medal in the 200 metres at the 2022 European Championships.

In April 2024, she lowered her own Danish national record to 22.60 seconds whilst competing in the United States. She competed at the 2024 Summer Olympics in Paris in the 200 metres.

== Personal life ==
She is from Lemvig, and studied sports management at Copenhagen Business Academy.
