= Emma Beiter Bomme =

Danish sprinter (born 1998)

Personal information
- Nationality: Danish
- Born: 28 June 1998 (age 28)
- Height: 1.70 m (5 ft 7 in)

Sport
- Sport: Track and Field
- Event(s): 60m, 100m, 200m

Achievements and titles
- Personal bests: Outdoor; 100 m: 11.75 (Oordegem 2021); 200 m: 23.76 (Oordegem 2021); Indoor; 60 m: 7.47 (Randers 2021); 200 m: 23.99 (Randers 2021)

Emma Beiter Bomme (born 28 June 1998) is a Danish sprinter and hurdler. She competed in the women's 4 x 100 metres relay for Denmark at the 2020 Olympic Games.

== Career ==
She is a member of Sparta athletic club in Copenhagen. Beiter Bomme competed for Denmark at the 2019 European Athletics Team Championships in June 2019. That month, she lowered her personal best for the 200 metres to 24.32 seconds whilst competing in Gothenburg, Sweden.

She ran for Denmark in the 4 × 100 metres relay at the delayed 2020 Summer Olympics, in Tokyo, Japan, where they finished seventh in their heat and running Astrid Glenner-Frandsen, Ida Karstoft and Mathilde Kramer, broke the Danish national record with a time of 43.51 seconds.

She competed for Denmark in the sprint relay at the 2023 European Athletics Team Championships in Silesia, Poland. She started training in hurdles in the summer of 2023. She competed for Denmark at the Nordic Athletics Championships in 2024, in the 60 metres hurdles. She ran as part of the Danish 4 × 100 m relay team at the 2024 World Relays Championships in Nassau, Bahamas. She finished sixth in the 100 metres hurdles at the 2024 Doha Diamond League event in May 2024.

== Personal life ==
She is the daughter of athletes. Her mother Charlotte Beiter won the Danish national heptathlon title and later served as athletics director at the Sparta Atletik club in Copenhagen, Denmark. Her father Carsten Bomme is the former Danish national decathlon champion and later worked as an athletics coach. Her sister Ida Beiter Bomme is also an international athlete.
