= Canillas =

Canillas may refer to:

- Canillas (Madrid), a ward (barrio) of Madrid, Spain
  - Canillas (Madrid Metro), a station of the Madrid Metro in Canillas ward
  - CD Canillas, a football club from Canillas ward
- Canillas de Abajo, a municipality in Salamanca, Spain
- Canillas de Aceituno, a municipality in Málaga, Spain
- Canillas de Albaida, a municipality in Málaga, Spain
- Canillas de Esgueva, a municipality in Valladolid, Spain
- Canillas de Río Tuerto, a municipality in La Rioja, Spain
- Canillas (footballer), a Spanish football player
- Mariana Canillas (born 1984), a Paraguayan athlete

== See also ==
- Caniles, a municipality in Spain
- Canillá, a municipality in Guatemala
