= Chíllar River =

River in Spain

Chíllar River Cahorros
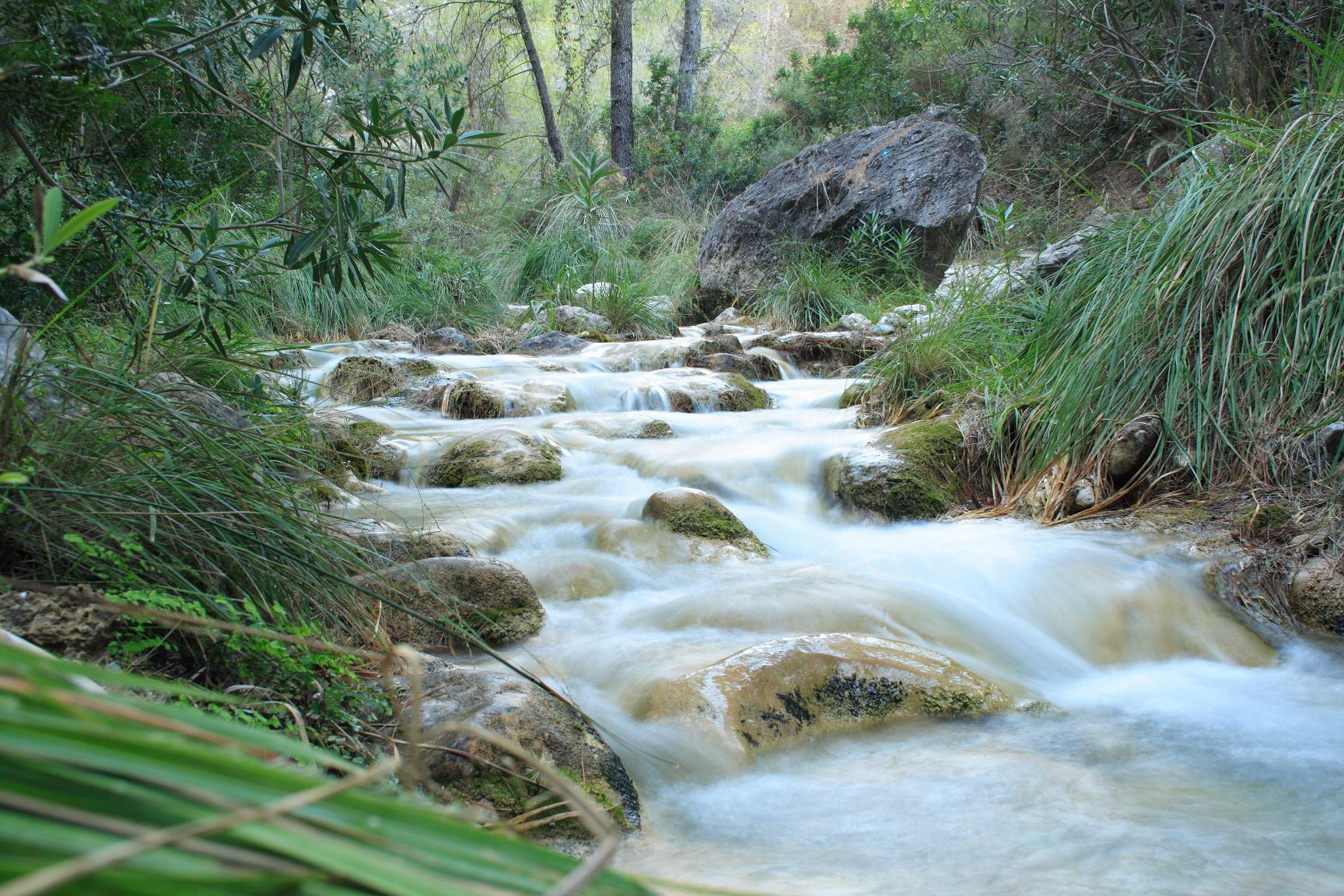

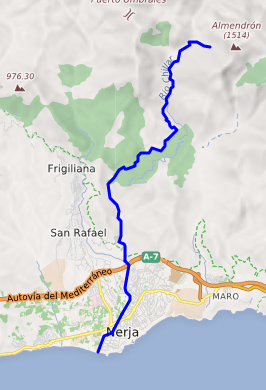
- Cours of the Chillar
- Native name: Río Chíllar (Spanish)

Location
- Country: Spain
- Autonomous community: Andalusia
- Province: Málaga
- Municipality: Cómpeta, Frigiliana and Nerja

Physical characteristics
- Source
  - location: Sierra de Almijara
  - elevation: 1,761 metres (5,778 ft)
- Mouth
  - location: Mediterranean Sea
  - coordinates: 36.741948°N 3.887488°W
  - elevation: 0 metres (0 ft)
- Length: 17 kilometres (11 mi)
- Basin size: 54 square kilometres (21 sq mi)
- Discharge
  - average: 0.2 cubic metres per second (7.1 cu ft/s)

Basin features
- Tributaries
  - right: Higuerón River

The Chíllar River is a river in the east of the Province of Málaga, Spain. It originates in the Sierra de Almijara and enters Mediterranean Sea just west of the town of Nerja.

== Location ==
Most of the river runs through the Sierras of Tejeda, Almijara and Alhama Natural Park, which is always open to the public. The catchment area is 54 square kilometres (21 sq mi). Discharge is 0.2 cubic metres per second (7.1 cu ft/s). The river descends from an altitude of 1,761 metres (5,778 ft) to the sea. The rocks are 98.1% carbonate, 1.9% siliceous. The river has eaten out the limestone of the Sierra de Almijara] to create a deep canyon.

In 1997 the municipality of Nerja launched a plan to stop the dumping of building rubble and garbage into the lower section of the river, and to make this section suitable for recreational use.

== Walk ==
A walk up the river to the "Vado de Los Patos" (Ducks' Ford) pool starts at the "los Almachares" asphalt road, which runs under the A-7 motorway to a concrete factory, turns to gravel and leads to the entrance to the park. Further up the route leads along the bed of the river, which is normally just ankle deep, but may be up to a foot deep at times. At 4 kilometres (2.5 mi) into the park the river runs through three narrow crevasses in the mountain just 1 metre (3 ft 3 in) wide but more than 20 metres (66 ft) deep.

At 8 kilometres (5.0 mi) the "Vado de Los Patos" pool is fed by a small waterfall, and provides a place for swimming. Above El Vado de los Patos the going is harder. About 2 kilometres (1.2 mi) higher the river crosses La Presa (The Dam), which holds a reservoir that feeds irrigation channels that run along one side of the river valley.

== Sources ==
- Bramwell, Bill (5 February 2004), Coastal Mass Tourism: Diversification and Sustainable Development in Southern Europe, Channel View Publications, ISBN 978-1-84541-373-6
- Javier Delgado Berzal, "The Nerja river (Chillar) walk", Nerja Tourism
- Puntí, Tura; Rieradevall, Maria; Prat, Narcís (March 2009), "Environmental factors, spatial variation, and specific requirements of Chironomidae in Mediterranean reference streams", Journal of the North American Benthological Society, 28 (1), The University of Chicago Press on behalf of the Society for Freshwater Science: 247–265, doi:10.1899/07-172.1, hdl:2445/32617, JSTOR 10.1899/07-172.1
- "Rio Chillar Walk", Absolute Axarquia
- Sierras de Tejeda, Almijara y Alhama, Empresa Pública para la Gestión del Turismo y del Deporte de Andalucía, S. A., 2011
