= Sierras of Tejeda, Almijara and Alhama Natural Park =

Protected area in the Spanish provinces of Málaga and Granada

- Parque natural de las Sierras de Tejeda, Almijara y Alhama
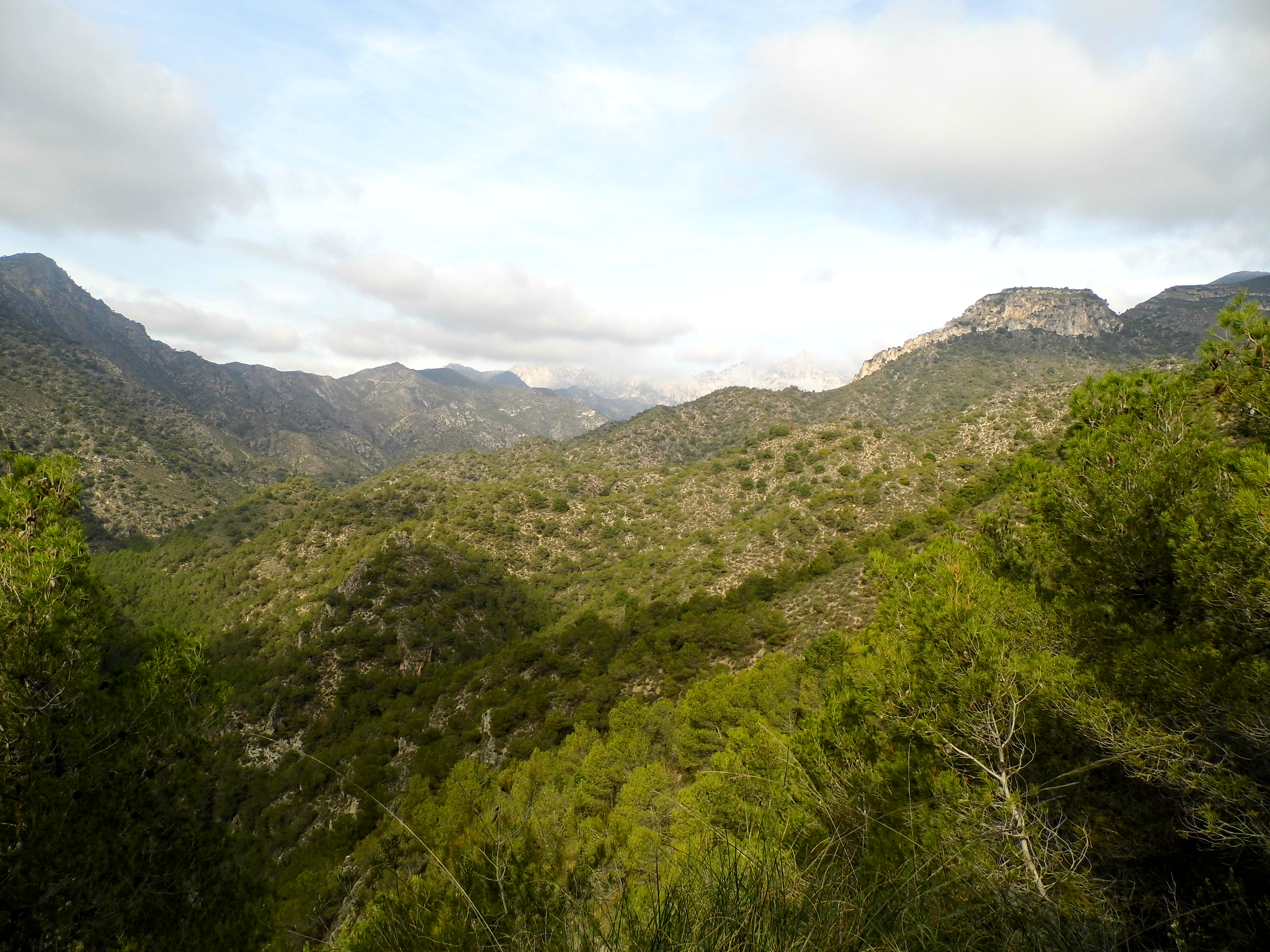
- Road between Frigiliana and Nerja

- Location within Spain
- Coordinates: 36.864454°N 3.867047°W
- Area: 40,657 ha (156.98 sq mi)
- Designation: Nature park
- Created: 12 November 1999

The Sierras of Tejeda, Almijara and Alhama Natural Park (Note: Some sources give the name as "Sierras of Tejeda, Almijara and Almara Natural Park".) (Spanish: Parque natural de las Sierras de Tejeda, Almijara y Alhama) is a protected area in the Spanish provinces of Málaga and Granada. It contains the Sierra de Tejeda and Sierra de Almijara mountains. (Note: The park does not include the Sierra de Alhama, which lies to the west, but the portion in Granada is in the Comarca de Alhama.) The park is mountainous and is partly covered by pine forests at the lower levels, while typical Mediterranean vegetation is found higher up. There is a large number of endemic species.

== Establishment ==
The park was declared on 21 September 1999. The park is designated "Lugares de Importancia Comunitaria" (LIC; Places of Community Importance) in Andalusia, "Zonas de Especial Protección para las Aves" (ZEPA; Special Protection Areas for Birds) in Andalusia and, "Parque adherido a la Carta Europea de Turismo Sostenible" (CETS; Park adhering to the European Charter for Sustainable Tourism). The park was designated a Site of Community Importance (SCI) of the Mediterranean Biogeographic Region by the European Commission on 19 July 2006. The Tejeda y Almijara National Hunting Reserve is part of the park.

== Location ==
The Sierras of Tejeda, Almijara and Alhama Natural Park covers parts of the municipalities of Alcaucín, Alhama de Granada, Arenas del Rey, Canillas de Aceituno, Canillas de Albaida, Cómpeta, Frigiliana, Jayena, Nerja, Otívar, Salares and Sedella in the provinces of Málaga and Granada. The park covers 40,657 hectares (100,470 acres). The park contains the Sierra de Tejeda and Sierra de Almijara mountains in the Axarquía comarca of the eastern province of Málaga and the Alhama comarca on the southwest of the province of Granada. It does not include the Sierra de Alhama, which is further west.

=== Climate ===
The mountains have relatively high levels of rainfall, with highest rainfall in December, January and March, and lowest in July. According to the Resource Management Plan (Decree 145/199 of the Junta de Andalucía) annual rainfall ranges from 400 millimetres (16 in) in Cacín, Almuñécar and Nerja to 1,000 millimetres (39 in) in Arenas del Rey, Alcaucín and Alfarnate. Temperatures in the areas with marine influence, including Nerja, Almuñecar, Frigiliana, Cómpeta, Canillas and Otívar, range from 4 to 30 °C (39 to 86 °F). Higher in the mountains the temperatures range from 0 to 22 °C (32 to 72 °F). Further inland in the Alhama region they range from −3.1 to 40 °C (26.4 to 104.0 °F) in summer.

=== Topography ===
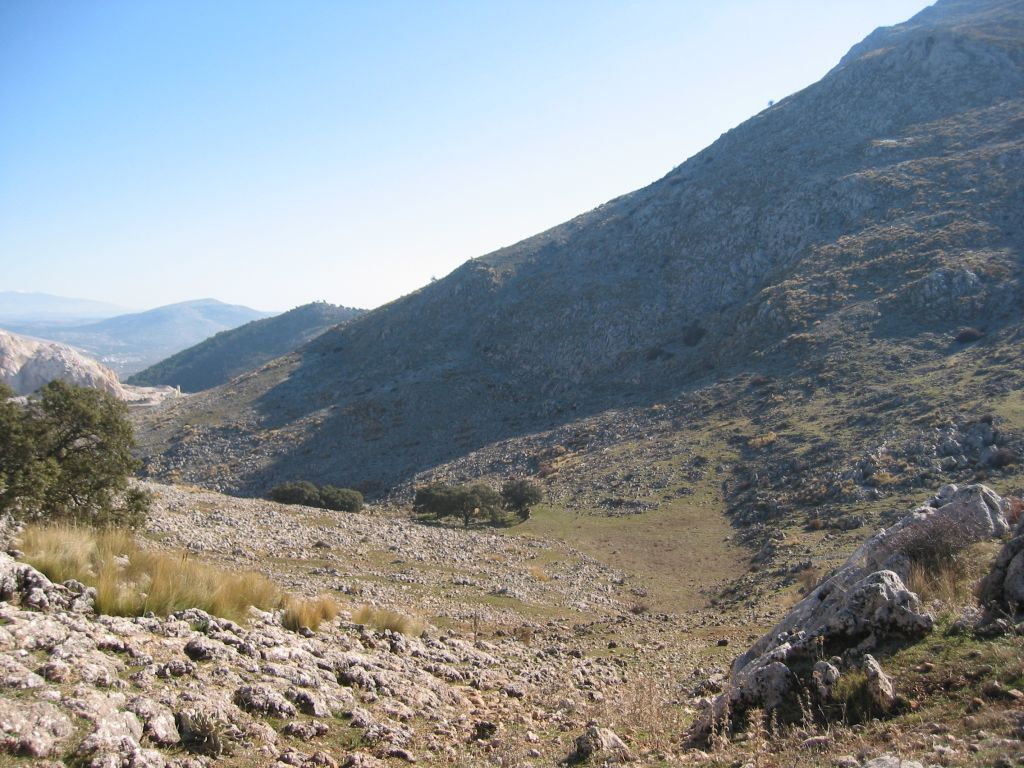
Sierra de Alhama

The Sierras de Tejeda, Almijara and Alhama Mountains extend north from the Mediterranean coast, with peaks over 1,500 metres (4,900 ft). The mountains contain deep ravines, steep slopes, sharp ridges and rugged crags. The mountains form a natural barrier between the two provinces. The peak of Tejeda (La Maroma) is 2,065 metres (6,775 ft) high, and commands dramatic views of the surrounding mountains and the Mediterranean coast. Other peaks are Cerro del Lucero at 1,779 metres (5,837 ft) and Navachica at 1,832 metres (6,010 ft).

All of the park has the calcareous formations of the Subbética region, with marbles, shales, phyllites, etc. The area is rich in quartzite and gneiss over 300 million years old. The most common rock in the Sierra Tejeda is limestone. The Sierra Almijara holds one of the Spain's main sources of dolomitic marble. The marble gives white and gray tones to the ridges and ravines. The limestone has been eaten out by water to create a maze of fissures, depressions and caves, including the deep canyon of the Chíllar River, the Polje of Zafarraya, the Caves of Nerja and La Fájara cave. The Caves of Nerja (Cueva de Nerja), with an entrance just south of the park, is a National Monument, as is the Sima de la Maroma (Maroma Gap).

The rivers and streams that drain the sierras to the south feed the Río Guaro, Río Vélez, Río Algarrobo, Río Torrox, Río Chíllar, and the Río Verde in Almuñécar to the east. To the west, some of the streams feed the Arroyo de la Madre, which is lost in the Polje de Zafarraya. To the north, the rivers ultimately feed the Guadalquivir, whose main basins are those of the Río Alhama, Río Cacín, Río Añales and Río Cebollón. The Río Grande and Río Granada feed the Los Bermejales Reservoir. The rivers and streams descend rapidly down the mountain slopes, with spectacular waterfalls such as Los Árboles Petrificados (The Petrified Trees), where limestone (calcium carbonate) in the water fossilized ancient logs. Elsewhere the waters have carved dramatic gorges, called Cahorros in the region.

The principal peaks are:

Peak	Altitude	Coordinates	Range
La Maroma	2,069 metres (6,788 ft)	36.902706°N 4.045587°W	Tejeda
Tajos del Sol	2,000 metres (6,600 ft)	36.835874°N 3.830683°W ?	Almijara
Cerro del Mojón	1,909 metres (6,263 ft)	36.914509°N 4.053398°W ?	Tejeda
Navachica	1,831 metres (6,007 ft)	36.841953°N 3.815238°W	Almijara
Malas Camas	1,792 metres (5,879 ft)	36.899177°N 3.973004°W	Tejeda
Cerro del Lucero or Raspón de los Moriscos	1,774 metres (5,820 ft)	36.867269°N 3.890734°W	Almijara
La Cadena	1,645 metres (5,397 ft)	36.854038°N 3.856203°W	Almijara
Pico del Cielo	1,508 metres (4,948 ft)	36.808307°N 3.809271°W	Almijara

- "Sierras de Tejeda, Almijara y Alhama", Hiking Iberia

== Flora ==
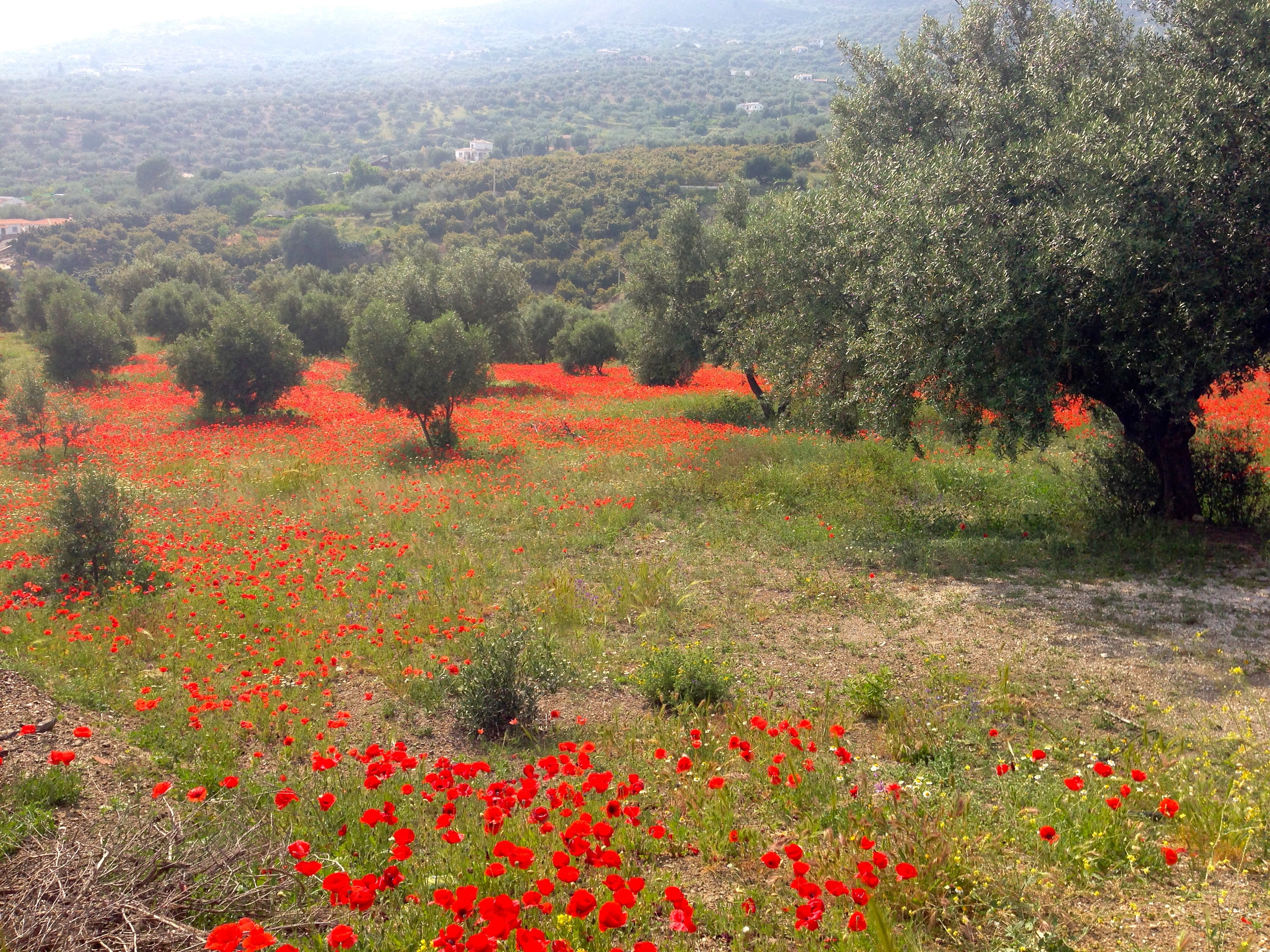
Sierras de Tejeda, Almijara y Alhama Natural Park

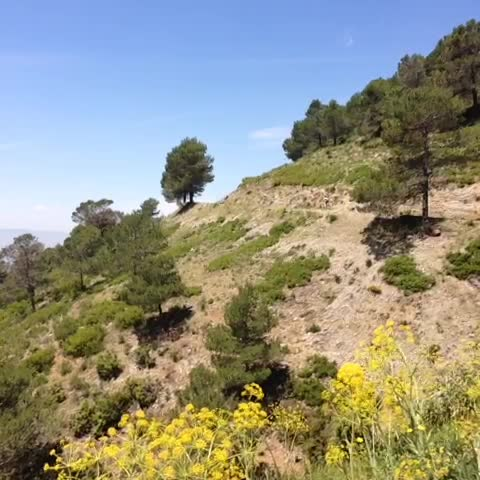
Sierras de Tejeda, Almijara y Alhama Natural Park

The name Tejeda refers to the abundance of Taxus baccata (yew) trees in the past. The southernmost tejeda in the Iberian peninsula can be seen on the route up to Salto del Caballo. The yew was once valued for its medicinal qualities and its wood, and was used in furniture. However, it was mostly eradicated because it is toxic to sheep and cattle. The Sierra de Cazulas had the unique Pino de las Cinco Ramas (Five-Branch Pine Tree). The headwaters of the Cárdenas River in Zafarraya have Salix fragilis (brittle willow). In the dry landscape along the borders of the park there are olive trees and vineyards, and also Opuntia (prickly pear) bushes, agaves and Trachycarpus fortunei (windmill palm) trees.

Due to its isolation there are many endemic species of flora. Notable flora include Buxus balearica (Balearic boxwood), Juniperus phoenicea (Phoenician juniper) and Ephedra distachya (joint pine). Where the marble has been eroded into a fine gravel the trees are mainly pine species such as Pinus nigra (Corsican pine), Pinus halepensis (Aleppo pine) and Pinus pinea (stone pine). Other shrubs and woodland plants include Chamaerops (dwarf fan palm), Sorbus (rowan), Genisteae (broom), Acer granatense (Spanish maple), Rhamnus cathartica (buckthorn), Maytenus senegalensis (spike thorn), Cneorum tricoccon (spurge olive], Sorbus aria (white beam tree), Viburnum tinus (laurestinus), Cotoneaster granatensis (cotoneaster) and Adenocarpus decorticans (goosefoot).

Higher up there are remnants of the original vegetation. The typical Mediterranean forests, woodlands, and scrub on the upper slopes have trees such as juniper, Quercus suber (cork oak), Quercus ilex (holm oak), Quercus lusitanica (gall oak) and Quercus pyrenaica (Pyrenean oak). On La Maroma the Quercus ilex (holm oak), Viburnum opulus (guelder-rose) and Rhamnus (buckthorn) give way higher up to Quercus lusitanica (gall oak) and traditional oaks and then to shrubands.

Common plants in the scrubland are Prunus prostrata (mountain cherry), Erinacea anthyllis (hedgehog broom), Astragalus granatensis (milk vetch), Echinospartum boissieri and hormathophylla spinosa (spiny madwort). The dolomitic gravel and sand areas have been colonized by endemic plants such as the knapweeds Centaurea bombycina and Centaurea prolongi, Saxifraga erioblasta, linaria amoi (toadflax), Erysimum myriophyllum (wallflower) Anthyllis tejedensis (Kidney vetch), Hippocrepis eriocarpa, Erinus alpinus (fairy foxglove), Silene boryi, Pinguicula submediterranea (a butterwort), Hieracium texedense, Aquilegia vulgaris (purple columbine), andryala agardhii, Odontites longiflora, Polygala boissieri (a milkwort) and Iberis grossi. There are many aromatic herbs such as oregano, rosemary, lemon thyme, lavender, savory and sage.

== Fauna ==
Birds include the resident golden eagle (Aquila chrysaetos) and Bonelli's eagle (Aquila fasciata). Other birds include griffon vulture (Gyps fulvus), Egyptian vulture (Neophron percnopterus) and horned owl. The peregrine falcon (Falco peregrinus), goshawk and common kestrel (Falco tinnunculus) may be seen, and the short-toed snake eagle (Circaetus gallicus) and booted eagle (Hieraaetus pennatus) during migration periods. Woodpeckers can be heard in the forests. The rocky areas are home of the crag martin (Hirundinidae), rock bunting (Emberiza cia), rock thrush, blue rock thrush (Monticola solitarius) and alpine accentor (Prunella collaris). Grey wagtails (Motacilla cinerea) and dippers use the streams and rivers, and in the summer golden orioles (Oriolus oriolus) and nightingales (Luscinia megarhynchos) are found in the poplar woods beside the rivers.

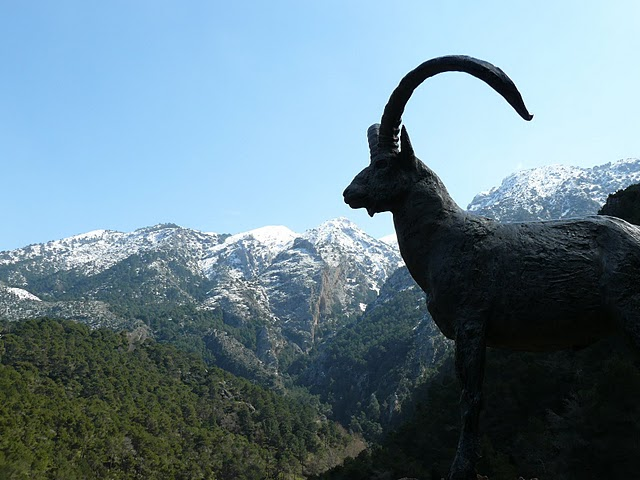
Iberian ibex on Maroma

The park is home to Iberian ibex (Capra pyrenaica), which have their greatest population in the park. This species was almost extinct 100 years ago, but has since rebounded to a population of about 2,000 goats, one of the largest in Spain. Common genets (Genetta genetta) are also present. The rivers hold trout, crayfish and otters. Betic midwife toads (Alytes dickhilleni) are endemic to the park and the massifs between Almería and Murcia. The caves are home to horseshoe bats and Malaga Glandular Cricket (Malacitana Petaloptila).

The amphibians include Iberian ribbed newt (Pleurodeles waltl) in ponds and streams, Betic midwife toad (Alytes dickhilleni), common toad (Bufo spinosus), Spanish painted frog (Discoglossus jeanneae), Natterjack toad (Epidalea calamita), Mediterranean tree frog (*Hyla meridionalis]), Iberian spadefoot toad (Pelobates cultripes), Perez's frog (Rana perezi) and marbled newt (Triturus marmoratus).

Among the reptiles there are specimens of spiny-footed lizard (Acanthodactylus erythrurus), Iberian worm lizard (Blanus cinereus), Bedriaga's skink (Chalcides bedriagai), Common chameleon (Chamaeleo chamaeleon), Southern smooth snake (Coronella girondica), Horseshoe whip snake (Hemorrhois hippocrepis), Montpellier snake (Malpolon monspessulanus), False smooth snake (Macroprotodon cucullatus), Spanish pond turtle (Mauremys leprosa), Viperine water snake (Natrix maura), Algerian sand racer (Psammodromus algirus), Cinderella Lizard (Psammodromus hispanicus), Iberian wall lizard (Podarcis hispanicus), Ladder snake (Zamenis scalaris), Common Salamanquesa (Tarentola mauritanica), Ocellated lizard (Timon lepidus), Snout viper (Vipera latastei).

== Human presence ==
=== Historical ===
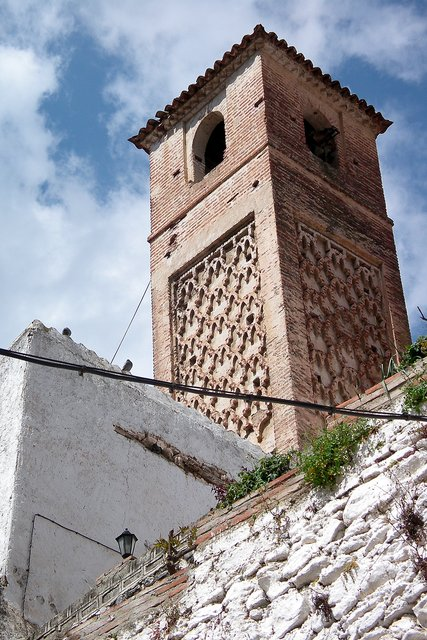
Alminar mudejar of the parish of Santa Ana de Salares

The steep mountain slopes and poor soils are unsuitable for agriculture, but the local people have hunted in the forests, and used the trees for pine resin, charcoal and firewood. The region has been home to diverse cultures, including a strong Muslim heritage, with white villages scattered through the remote valleys and mountain ranges. The west of Granada held the last Nasrid strongholds in Spain. Alhama has an interesting complex of buildings of Roman, Andalusian and Moorish origin, with limestone facades and twisted arches, stairways and towers. The Axarquía, of marked Moorish character, has one of the most representative architectural samples in the Alminar Tower of the town of Salares.

The inhabitants of the inaccessible mountains joined the Morisco rebellion after the Granada War. The mountains have been used as a refuge by bandits, and during the Spanish Civil War (1936-1939) by anti-Franco guerrillas. In the past, trails were made through the mountains to carry fish north to the markets of Granada. In the 19th century the mountains were exploited intensively for mining, sheep herding and wine production. Later they were reforested with pine species to provide timber.

=== Tourism ===
The cuisine reflects the fertile lands, rich in the production of tropical fruits such as Otívar. Traditional foods include the potajes de la sierra (thick soups), game meat, choto (young goat) and artisanal goat cheeses. The Malaga region is known for muscat wines.

Recreational activities include canyoning, caving, mountaineering and free flight, mountain biking, hiking, birdwatching, mushroom picking and trout fishing in the Cacín River. Designated camping areas in the park include La Alcaéca camping area, El Robledal camping area, and La Rahige with picnic areas and barbecue pits. The Cortijo de Alcázar and Fábrica de la Luz campsite have showers and toilets, and the El Pinarillo campsite has toilets. Most of the villages around the park have hotels and hostels.

=== Festivals ===
The communities surrounding the park hold festivals at different times:

Province	Community	Festival	Dates
Málaga	Alcaucín	Chestnut Festival	Last Sunday of October
Granada	Alhama de Granada	Music Festival	Early August
Granada	Arenas del Rey	Saint Sebastian Festival	20 January
Málaga	Canillas de Aceituno	Black pudding day	Last Sunday of April
Málaga	Canillas de Albaida	Candlemas Day	7–8 September
Málaga	Cómpeta	Wine Night	15 August
Málaga	Frigiliana	Pilgrimage of Saint Sebastian	20 January
Granada	Jayena	Celebrations of the patron Our Lady of the Rosary	Around August 22
Málaga	Nerja	Cave Festival	End of July and/or start of August
Granada	Otívar	Celebrations of the patron Immaculate Conception	6–9 December
Málaga	Salares	As-Shark thematic fair	Third weekend of September
Málaga	Sedella	Pilgrimage of Saint Anthony the Great	Saturday closest to January 17

== Sources ==
- Arenas, Antonio, "Sierras de Alhama, Tejeda and Almijara Natural Park", Waste Magazine (in Spanish)
- Decreto 2/2016, de 12 de enero, por el que se declara la Zona Especial de Conservación Sierras de Tejeda, Almijara y Alhama (Es6170007) y se aprueban el plan de ordenación de los recursos naturales y el plan rector de uso y gestión del Parque Natural Sierras de Tejeda, Almijara y Alhama (PDF) (in Spanish), Consejería de Medio Ambiente y Ordenación del Territorio
- Parque natural Sierras de Tejeda, Almijara y Alhama (in Spanish), Junta de Andalucía
- Sierras de Tejeda, Almijara y Alhama, Empresa Pública para la Gestión del Turismo y del Deporte de Andalucía, S. A., 2011
- Williams, Jo, "Sierras of Tejeda, Almijara and Almara Natural Park", Andalucia.com
