= Canillas de Albaida =

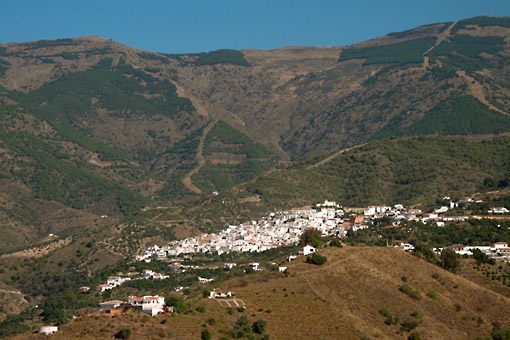

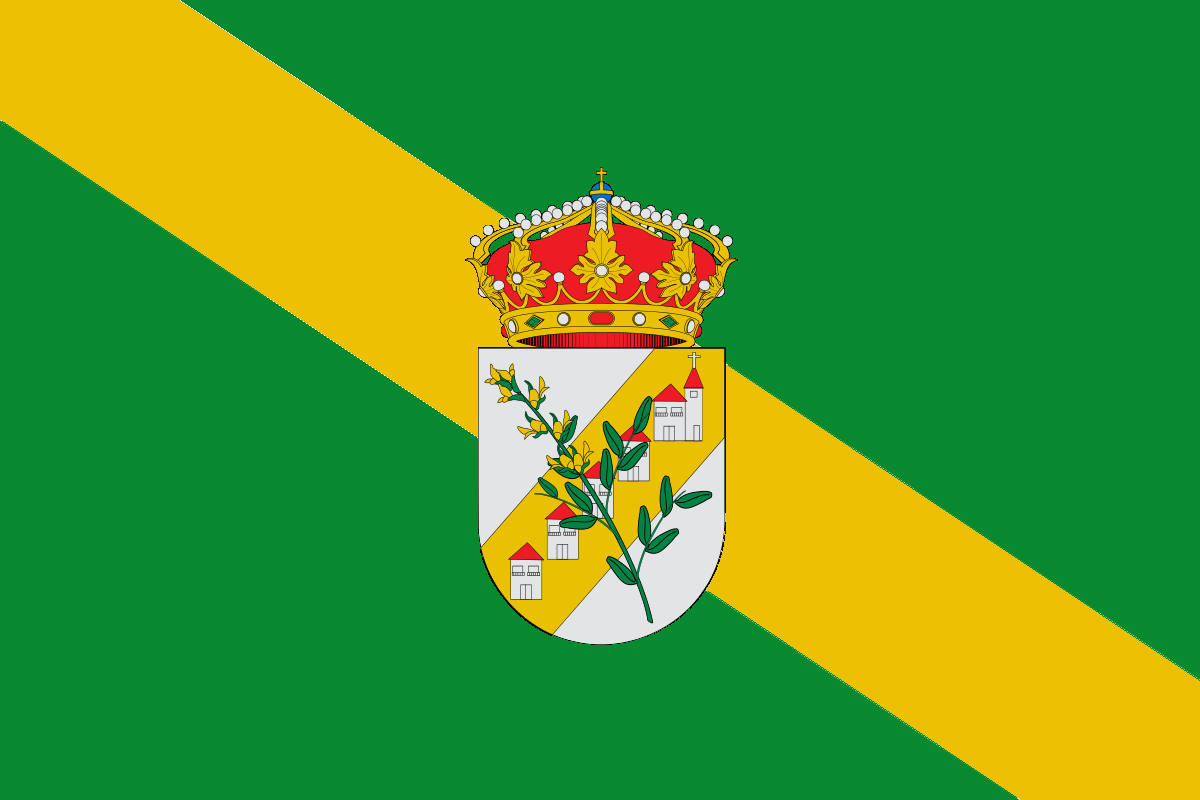
- Flag Coat of arms

- Location in Andalusia
- Coordinates: 36°51′00″N 3°58′59″W
- Sovereign state: Spain
- Autonomous community: Andalusia
- Province: Málaga
- Comarca: Axarquía

Government

Area
  - Total: 33 km^{2} (13 sq mi)
- Elevation: 630 m (2,070 ft)

Population (2025-01-01)
  - Total: 807
  - Density: 24/km^{2} (63/sq mi)
- Demonym: Canillero
- Time zone: UTC+1 (CET)
  - Summer (DST): UTC+2 (CEST)
- Website: http://www.canillasdealbaida.es

View of Canillas de Albaida

Canillas de Albaida is a town and municipality in the province of Málaga, part of the autonomous community of Andalusia in southern Spain. It has a population of approximately 800 residents. The natives are called Canilleros. The village is one of several typical Andalucian Pueblos Blancos which ring the edge of the national parks.

The village has seen considerable growth and renovation after the 2000 millennium, as a result of an increase in tourism and the number of expatriate residents from northern Europe. There are restaurants and shops. Three hotels have been established after 2000 and the road leading to the coast has been paved and widened.

The staple industry here is agriculture, the principal crops being avocados, raisins, wine from moscatel grapes and olives. Kitchen vegetables are also grown extensively on ancient irrigated terraces, for local sale and consumption. Farming is mostly done by hand, the only significant "machinery" being mules which are used as beasts of burden and for ploughing. The arrival of a more modern community has not obliterated the traditional lifestyle of the village and its surroundings.

== Geography ==
The village sits on the edge of the Sierras of Tejeda, Almijara and Alhama Natural Park, a haven for wildlife and walking. The highest point is La Maroma in the Sierra de Tejeda which has an altitude of 2,068 metres above sea level. The urban center in the Sierras with an altitude of 576 metres. The municipality is situated approximately 50 kilometres from Málaga and 2.5 kilometres from Cómpeta.

Canillas de Albaida is within the Route of Sun and Wine, as well as the "white villages of the Costa del Sol." The locality is characterized by its tight village of narrow streets, winding and steep, and whitewashed houses. It has an area of 33 km^{2} and a census of 813 residents in 2006. All its area is included in the Natural Park of Sierras de Tejada, Almijara and Alhama.

== History ==
Some scholars have dated the 13th century as the first time when news of this population center appeared. In the files of Al-hawz or word of Velez, it was listed as belonging to the same farm, under the name of Albaida (white) for the abundance of white flowers that existed in its environment. In 1487, after the conquest of Vélez-Málaga by the Catholic Monarchs, Canillas de Albaida was added to the compliance requirements imposed by King Ferdinand. In 1569 its neighbors, mostly Moors, joined the Competa and other regions that rebelled against the oppression of Philip II, until defeated at the Battle of the Rock of Frigiliana. After repopulation, which was dominated by Christians from points near the province and the rest of Andalusia, Canillas de Albaida developed neighbors dedicated to agriculture, emphasizing the cultivation of grapevine, cereals and olives.

== See also ==
- List of municipalities in Málaga
