= Antonio de Sedella =

Spanish Capuchin friar

The Reverend Antonio de Sedella OFM
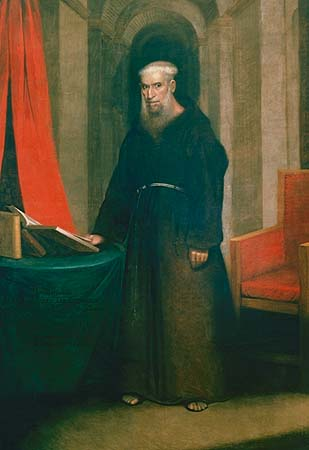
- Père Antoine (Padre Antonio de Sedella) at Age Seventy-Four, by Edmund Brewster, New Orleans, 1822

Personal life
- Born: Francisco Ildefonso Mareno; 1748 Sedella, Spain
- Died: 19 January 1829 (aged 80-81) New Orleans, Louisiana

Religious life
- Religion: Catholicism

Antonio de Sedella, OFM Cap. (born Francisco Ildefonso Mareno; 1748 – 19 January 1829) was a Spanish Capuchin friar who served as the leading religious authority of the Catholic Church in New Orleans, Louisiana, during the late 18th and early 19th centuries. Commonly called "Père Antoine", he is a noted figure in the culture of the city. A street and a restaurant in the city's historic French Quarter are named for him.

== Life ==
He was born Francisco Ildefonso Mareno in the town of Sedella located in the Province of Málaga and, as a teenager, entered the Order of Friars Minor Capuchin by which he was given the religious name Antonio. Presumably a short time after his ordination as a priest, he arrived in New Orleans in 1774 as an official of the Spanish Inquisition after the transfer of the colony of Louisiana to Spain by France a decade earlier. Named pastor of the Church of St. Louis in the city, after gaining a reputation for rigidity in his early dealings with the people of New Orleans, he later became known to them for his dedication to the prisoners of the city, as well as to its large slave population. He baptized the famous Marie Laveau (1801–1881), who later gained a large following as a voodoo priestess, and presided over her wedding in 1819.

In his depiction of Friar Antonio in the novel Père Antoine (New York: Doubleday & Co., 1956), the writer Edward F. Murphy portrayed him as a rigid ideologue, who was responsible for the destruction of the city due to his refusal to allow the church bells to ring in warning, out of the religious prohibition of this on Good Friday, which was observed that year on the day the fire occurred. With the establishment of a diocese by the Holy See for the colony in 1793, the new church was designated as its cathedral, and Friar Antonio was appointed as its rector by the Spanish Crown.

After the sale of the colony to the United States in 1803, the Holy See appointed the Rev. Louis Dobourg, SS, as the Apostolic Administrator of the diocese. Sedella did not fully accept his authority until Dubourg traveled to Rome and word was sent in support of his decisions to Archbishop John Carroll, the leading authority of the Catholic Church in the country.

Friar Antonio continued as Rector of the cathedral until his death on 19 January 1829. He was buried in the church three days later.
