= Sierra de Tejeda =

Mountain range in Spain

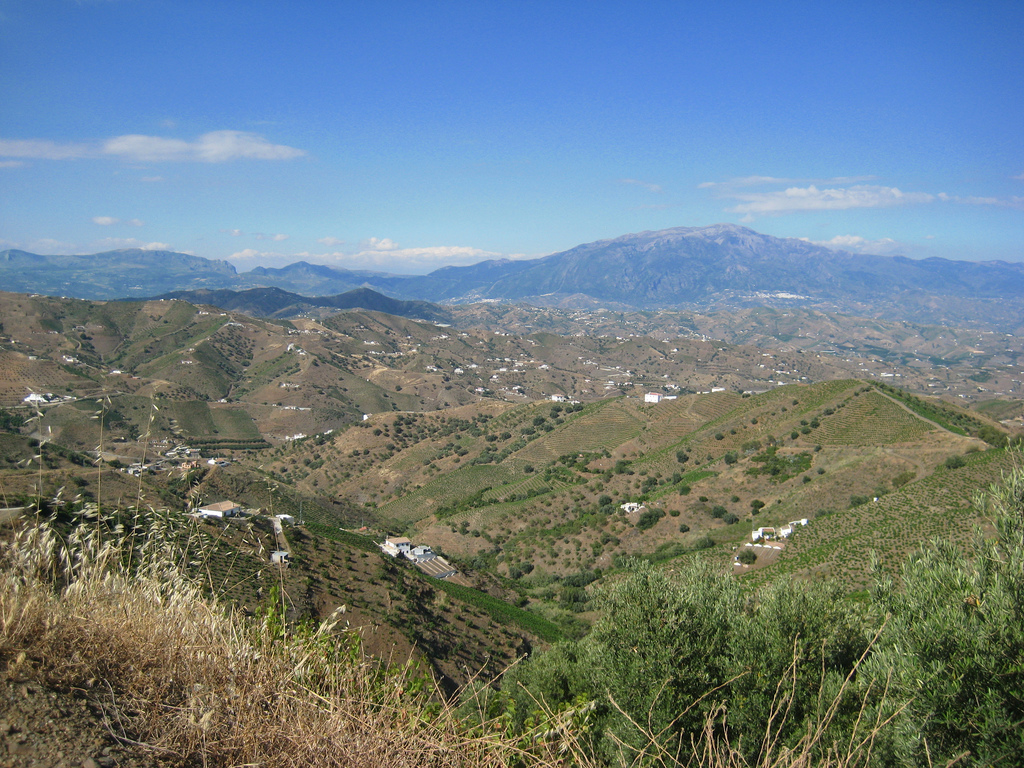

Highest point
- Peak: La Maroma
- Elevation: 2,073 m (6,801 ft)
- Prominence: 1,241 m (4,072 ft)
- Listing: Ribu
- Coordinates: 36.904910°N 4.036516°W

Naming
- Etymology: The name "Tejeda'" refers to the abundance of Taxus baccata (yew) trees in the past.

Geography
- Location within Spain
- Country: Spain
- Autonomous community: Andalusia
- Provinces: Málaga and Granada

Geology
- Rock age: 300 million years
- Mountain type: Mountain range
- Rock type: Calcareous formations

The Sierra de Tejeda is a mountain range in the Penibaetic System of mountains between the provinces of Málaga and Granada in Spain. Together with the Sierra de Almijara to the east and the Sierra de Alhama to the west it constitutes a limestone massif that acts as a physical border between the two provinces, separating the Axarquía from the depression of Granada. The mountains contain the Sierras of Tejeda, Almijara and Alhama Natural Park.

== Location ==
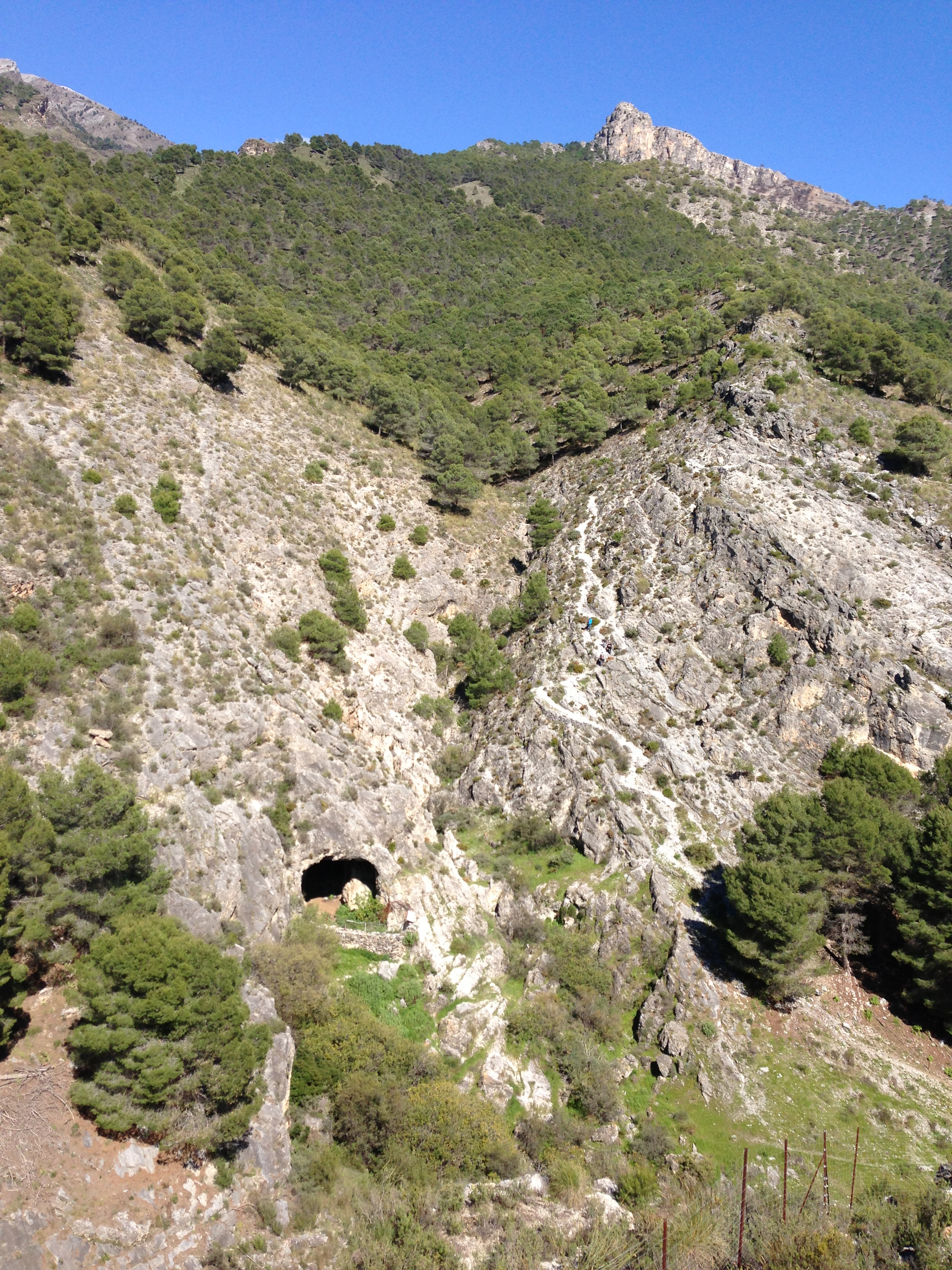
Alcaucín - Canillas de Aceituno, April 2013

The Sierra de Tejeda is a small mountain range running in a northwest to southeast direction. It lies in the east of the Málaga and the southwest of the Granada. It covers an area of 6,755 square kilometres (2,608 sq mi). The Sierre de Tejeda lies to the southeast of the Sierra de Alhama and to the northwest of the Sierra de Almijara. The Sierras of Tejida and Almijara form a single range about 40 kilometres (25 mi) west of the Sierra Nevada. The mountains form part of a barrier between the coast and the interior.

The name "Tejeda'" refers to the abundance of Taxus baccata, or tejos (yew) trees in the past.. There are a few remnants of these pines on La Maroma, including one at the Salto del Caballo near the peak. A small group is found in the upper part of the Barranco del Cañuelo in the municipality of Alcaucín.

== Geology ==
The Sierra de Tejeda is in the central section of the Betic Range of Southern Spain. This part of the Betic cordilla has folds verging southwards from the Burdigalian age. The folds are cut by WSW-directed faults caused by extensional detachments in the Sierra de Tejeda anticline, and the fault surfaces are in turn cut by later NNW-directed faults from the Tortonian age.

The most common rock in the Sierra Tejeda is limestone. The rocks belong to the Alpujarride complex. They include Middle and Late Miocene deposits up to 30 metres (98 ft) thick of conglomerates, sands and bioclastic calcarenites. The bioclastic calcarenites contain marble cobbles and boulders up to 1 metre (3 ft 3 in) in diameter. The Sierra Almijara and Sierra Tejeda form the southern margin of the western part of the depression of Granada, and contain tributaries of the Cacín River. Pliocene sediments exposed in the northwest of the Granada basin were washed down by the Cacín from the Alpujarride reliefs of the Almijara/Tejeda.

The 1884 Andalusian earthquake had an estimated magnitude of 6.5. There were 745 deaths, and the villages of Arenas del Rey, Ventas de Zafarraya and Alhama de Granada were almost completely destroyed. The epicenter was on the northern side of the Sierra Tejeda near Ventas de Zefarraya, with a focus 12,300 metres (40,400 ft) deep. The pioneering geologist José Macpherson y Hemas (1839–1902) explained the earthquake as having been caused by movement along the faults that bound the Tejeda / Almijara massif to the north and south. Others thought the cause might have been the collapse of underground cavities.

== Pico Tejeda ==
The peak of Tejeda (La Maroma) is 2,065 metres (6,775 ft) high, and commands dramatic views of the surrounding mountains and the Mediterranean coast. The Pico Tejeda, commonly called La Maroma, is also known as the "roof of Málaga". The name is derived from a large and deep cavity near the top. Ropes (maromas) were used to climb down into it to collect snow. The mountain can be climbed by several routes, of which the most traditional starts from the center of Canillas de Aceituno. Other routes start from the Alcázar recreational area and from the Llanadas de Sedella in the municipality of Alcaucín. One of the simplest routes is on its north face in the territory of Alhama de Granada, starting from the El Robledal recreational area.

== Climate ==
The mountains have relatively high levels of rainfall, with highest rainfall in December, January and March, and lowest in July. Annual rainfall is 1,000 millimetres (39 in) in Alcaucín. At an altitude of 1,700 metres (5,600 ft) the annual average precipitation is slightly more than 900 millimetres (35 in). The Sierre de Tejeda receives a total of 8.6 cubic hectometres (300,000,000 cu ft) of rainfall in an average year.

Annual average temperature at the Pantano de los Bermejales station at the foot of the Sierra is about 8 °C (46 °F). Higher in the mountains the temperatures range from 0 to 22 °C (32 to 72 °F). The flora are mostly xeric. There are many plant species common to the western Sierra Nevada and the Tejeda/Almijara range, which may have migrated between these regions via the intermediate Sierra de las Guájaras.

== Human presence ==
The early hominids in the region would have moved from caves on the coast to caves in the Sierra de Tejeda on a seasonal basis. The 40,000 year old bones of a Neanderthal man have been found in the Boquete de Zafarraya cave in Alcaucín, in a spur of the Sierra de Alhama just west of the Sierra de Tejeda. Canillas de Aceituno is at the foot of the Sierra, at an altitude of 649 metres (2,129 ft), in the region between the marbles of the Sierra de Tejeda and the schist land lower down in the slopes of the Almanchares river basin. The Fajara cave was used in the Neolithic era, and the Rábita cave shows evidence of iron ore extraction in Roman times. Three bridges on the slopes of the sierra in the towns of Sedella, Salares and Canillas de Albaida are said to have a Roman origin, although their appearance today is medieval.

== Sources ==
- 10 Años de Estudio Sobre Taxus Baccata (Tejo) y la Sierra de Tejeda (PDF), Ceder Axarquía, 2 June 2009
- Almellones, Javier (23 February 2019), "Los enclaves más espectaculares en las sierras de Tejeda, Almijara y Alhama", Diario Sur (in Spanish), Málaga
- Anexo II Plan de Ordenación de los Recursos Naturales del Parque Natural Sierras de Tejada, Almijara y Alhama (PDF) (in Spanish), Junta de Andalucia, 2016
- Arenas, Antonio, "Sierras de Alhama, Tejeda and Almijara Natural Park", Waste Magazine (in Spanish)
- "Etapa 8, Canillas de Aceituno - Periana", Caminando por la Historia de la provincia • Gran Senda de Málaga (in Spanish), Diputación de Málaga
- García Alix, Antonio; Minwer Barakat, Raef; Martín, José M.; Martín Suárez, Elvira; Freudenthal, Matthijs (July–August 2009), "Dating The Change From Endorheic To Exorheic Conditions In The Drainage System Of The Granada Basin (Southern Spain)", PALAIOS, 24 (7/8), SEPM Society for Sedimentary Geology: 544–549, Bibcode:2009Palai..24..544G, doi:10.2110/palo.2009.p09-015r, JSTOR 40606444
- Gibbons, Wes; Moreno, Teresa (2002), The Geology of Spain, Geological Society of London, ISBN 978-1-86239-110-9
- Gutiérrez Larena, Belén; Fuertes Aguilar, Javier; Nieto Feliner, Gonzalo (September 2006), "Dispersal across Southern Iberian Refugia? Integrating RAPDs, Sequence Data and Morphometrics in Armeria (Plumbaginaceae)", Folia Geobotanica, 41 (3), Springer: 305–322, doi:10.1007/BF02904944, hdl:10261/29779, JSTOR 25134150
- Parque natural Sierras de Tejeda, Almijara y Alhama (in Spanish), Junta de Andalucía
- "Sierra De Tejeda: Subida Norte a La Maroma (2.066m) desde El Robledal en Alhama de Granada", AristaSur
- Udías, Agustín (2013), "Development Of Seismology In Spain In The Context Of The Three Large Earthquakes Of 1755, 1884 And 1954", Earth Sciences History, 32 (2), History of Earth Sciences Society: 186–203, doi:10.17704/eshi.32.2.f1168212m214l532, JSTOR 24140011
- Williams, Jo, "Sierras of Tejeda, Almijara and Almara Natural Park", Andalucia.com
- Wisshak, Max; Tapanila, Leif (20 September 2008), Current Developments in Bioerosion, Springer Science & Business Media, ISBN 978-3-540-77598-0
