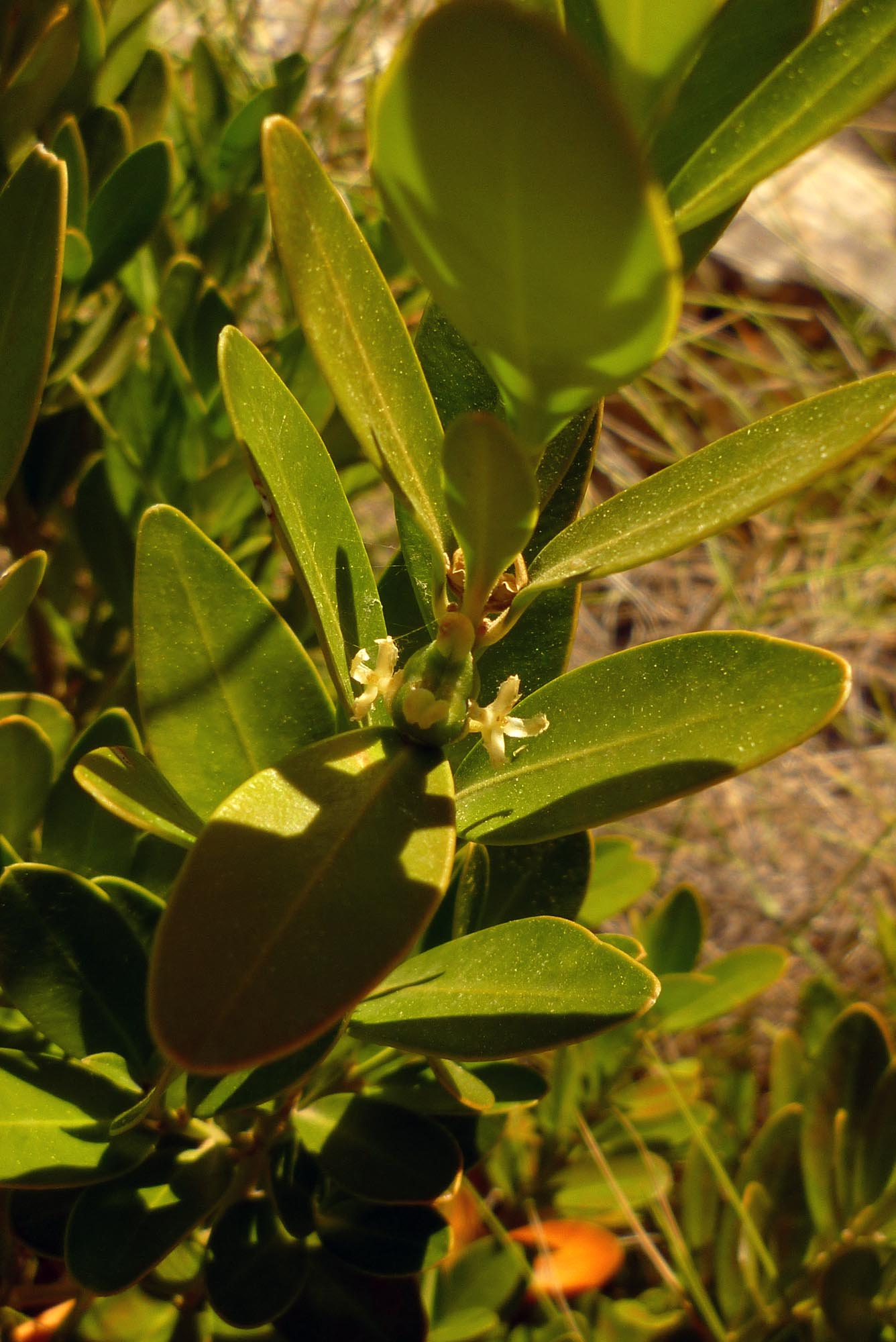

Scientific classification
- Kingdom: Plantae
- Clade: Tracheophytes
- Clade: Angiosperms
- Clade: Eudicots
- Order: Buxales
- Family: Buxaceae
- Genus: Buxus
- Species: B. balearica

Binomial name
- Buxus balearica Lam.
- Distribution range of Buxus balearica

= Buxus balearica =

Species of flowering plant

Buxus balearica, the Balearic boxwood, is a shrub or small evergreen tree typical of the Mediterranean forest. It grows wild in Algeria, Morocco, the Island of Sardinia and Spain.

== Description ==
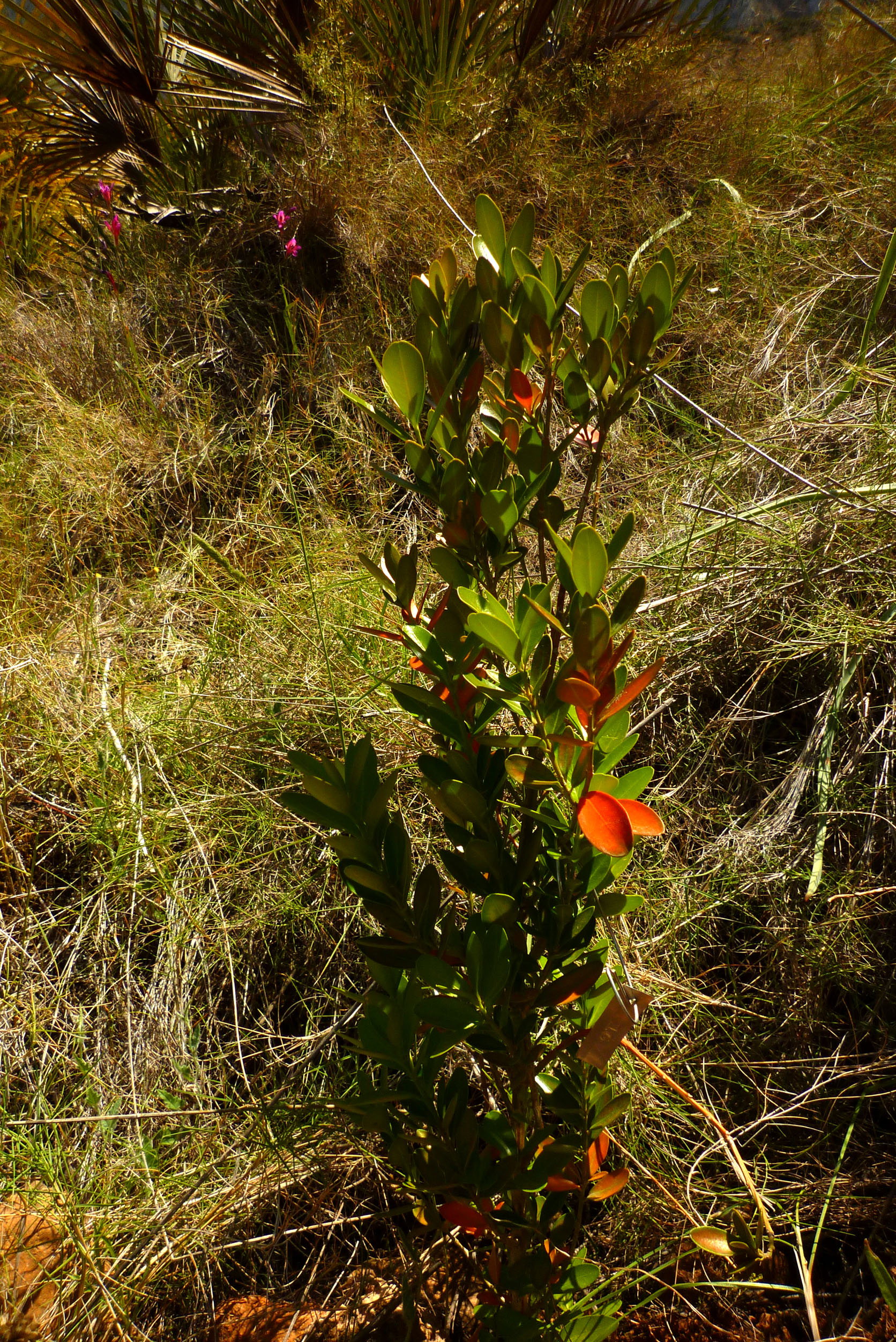
Young Balearic Boxwood

The Balearic boxwood is a monoecious tree or shrub up to three meters high. Its leaves, somewhat larger than those of the common boxwood, are oval and bright, sometimes showing a reddish or yellowish color. It blooms in spring and can be reproduced from seeds or from cuttings. Like other Mediterranean species, it is able to regenerate well after a fire.

== Distribution in Spain ==
In Spain the Balearic boxwood can be found in very fragmented populations in Eastern Andalusia and the Balearic Islands.

In Eastern Andalusia, it is found in the provinces of Málaga and Granada in the Sierras of Tejeda, Almijara and Alhama Natural Park. It is also found in the Province of Almería in the Sierra de Gádor.

In the Balearic Islands it can be found in the Serra de Tramuntana of Mallorca, as well as in the Island of Cabrera, but has become extinct from the island of Menorca.

In the Region of Murcia the species was cited in 1943 in the Sierra de la Muela, Cabo Tiñoso y Roldán, but is currently considered extinct.

In general, in Spain, it is included in the IUCN Red List of threatened vascular flora as "near threatened", in the Red List of vascular flora in Eastern Andalusia, as "vulnerable".

== Distribution in Africa ==
In Morocco it can be found in the Rif, in the Talassemtane National Park.

== Taxonomy ==
Buxus balearica was described by Jean-Baptiste Lamarck and published in Encyclopedie Méthodique, Botanique 1 (2): 511. 1785.

Cytology

Number of chromosomes of Buxus balearica and infraspecific taxa: 2n = 28

Etymology

Buxus: generic name that derives from the ancient Greek bus, Latinized buxus, buxum which is the name given to boxwood.

Balearica: geographical epithet that alludes to its location in the Balearic Islands.

Synonymy
Buxus haleppica K. Koch
Buxus longifolia Boiss.
