= Cómpeta =

- Municipality
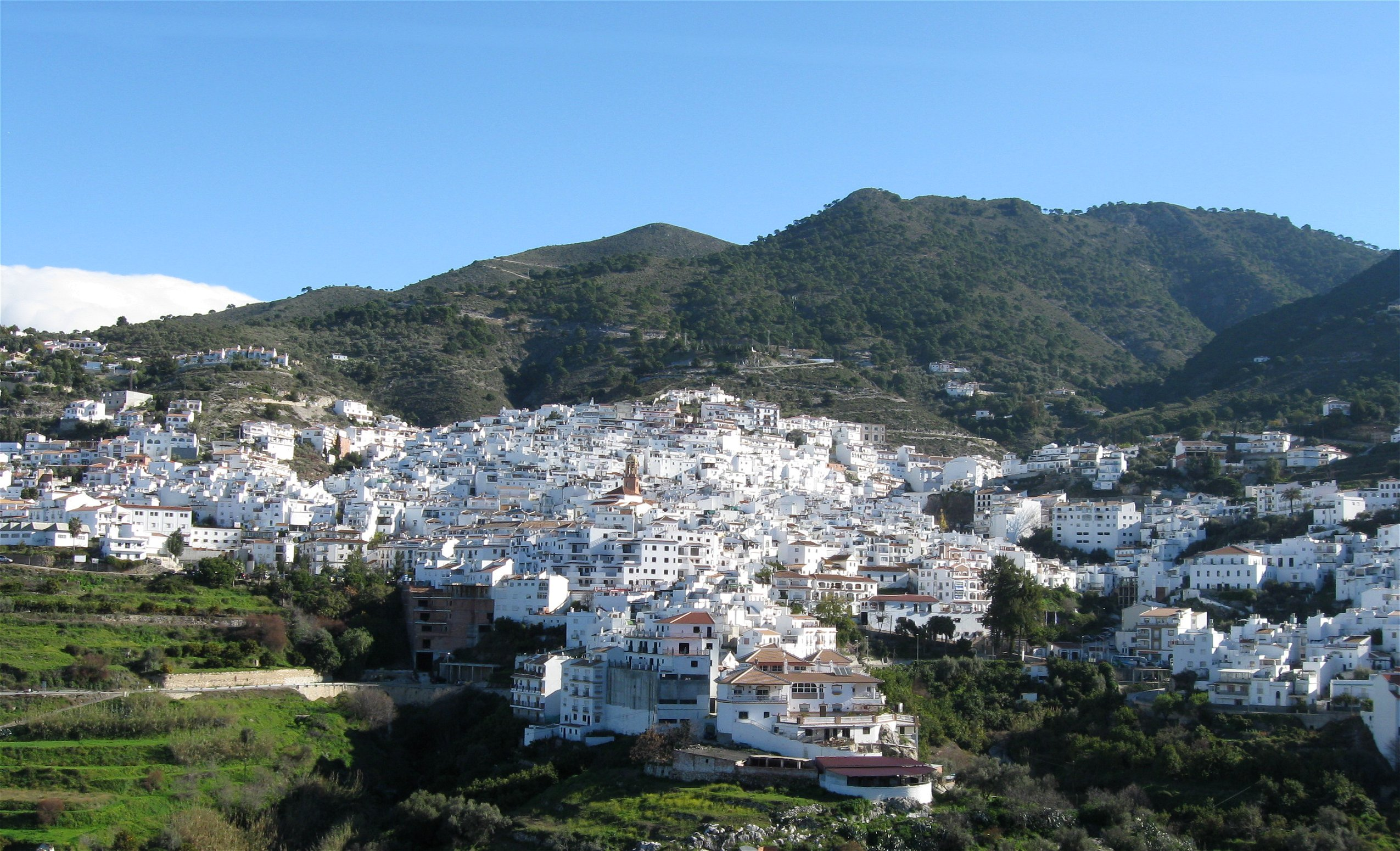
- View of Cómpeta

- Flag Coat of arms

- Location in Spain
- Coordinates: 36°50′N 3°59′W
- Country: Spain
- Autonomous community: (Andalusia) Andalucía
- Province: Málaga Province
- Comarca: Axarquía-Costa del Sol

Government

Area
  - Total: 54.7 km^{2} (21.1 sq mi)
- Elevation: 636 m (2,087 ft)

Population (2025-01-01)
  - Total: 3,824
  - Density: 69.9/km^{2} (181/sq mi)
- Time zone: UTC+1 (CET)
  - Summer (DST): UTC+2 (CEST)
- Postal code: 29754
- Area code: (+34) 952
- Website: http://www.competa.es/

Cómpeta is a town and municipality in the comarca of Axarquía, and province of Málaga, part of the autonomous community of Andalusia in southern Spain. The municipality is situated approximately 18 kilometres from the coast (Costa del Sol), and 52 kilometres from Málaga, the provincial capital. It is situated at 638 metres above sea level in the foothills of La Maroma (the highest peak of the Sierra de Tejeda). The population is spread over the southern slopes of the Sierra de Almijara.

Cómpeta has a population of approximately 4,000 residents and the natives are called competeños. Cómpeta residents are diverse in both culture and nationality, with many residents originating from other countries across Europe such as the UK and other Northern European countries including Germany, Denmark, The Netherlands and Norway.

Cómpeta's patron saint is San Sebastian. During the last weekend in July, Cómpeta celebrates its patron saint by holding a fiesta (fair).

On 15 August of every year (Assumption Day), Cómpeta celebrates the 'Noche del Vino' ('night of the wine'), which is a festival declared of tourist interest by official government decree ('Declaración de Interés Turístico National de Andalucia').

It takes approximately one hour to reach the village from Málaga Airport, along the coastal motorway and then inland via the well maintained mountain road.

== Geography ==
=== Mountains ===
The town is southwest of the Sierras of Tejeda, Almijara and Alhama Natural Park. The Tejeda and Almijara mountains, declared a National Reserve of Major Hunting and included in the Catalogue of Areas and Protected Goods of the Junta of Andalusia, extend over an area of approximately 20,543 hectares. They include the municipalities of Alcaucín, Canillas de Aceituno, Sedella, Salares, Canillas de Albaida, Cómpeta, Frigiliana and Nerja.

The highest point visible from the town is the Maroma (2,065 m). The topography of the terminus is quite hilly, especially in the northwest, which borders the province of Granada. Other important elevations are Cerro Lucero (1,779 m), Cisne (1,600 m), Verde (1,554 m) and Tajo de las Grajas, which has a length of 200 metres.

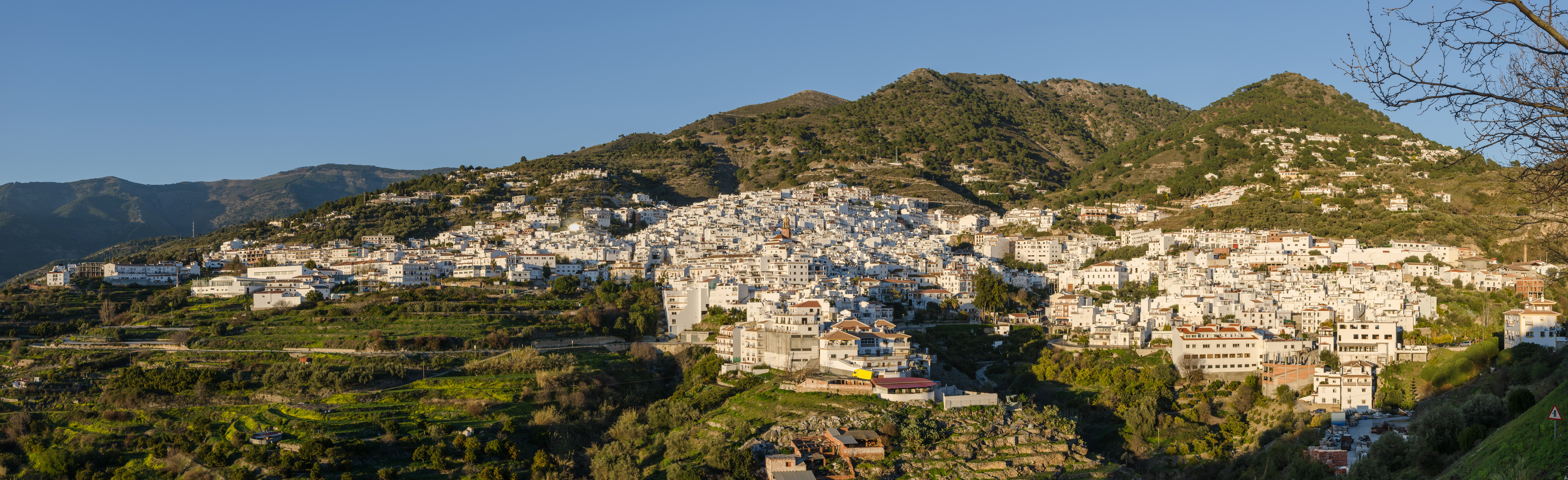
Panoramic overview of Cómpeta

=== Neighbourhoods ===
Cómpeta has a neighbourhood on the mountain called El Acebuchal which recently has built a chapel for its few inhabitants. Their houses are spread over a hillside to the other side across several kilometres to Frigiliana.

== History ==
Cómpeta has Roman origins. Its name derives from the Latin phrase Compita-Orum, which means "crossing of roads." It was a place where the Romans held their feasts and offerings. It was also a place to shop and sell products. This is believed to be the town's origin as there are no written documents to support it.

== See also ==
- List of municipalities in Málaga
