= Los Bermejales Reservoir =

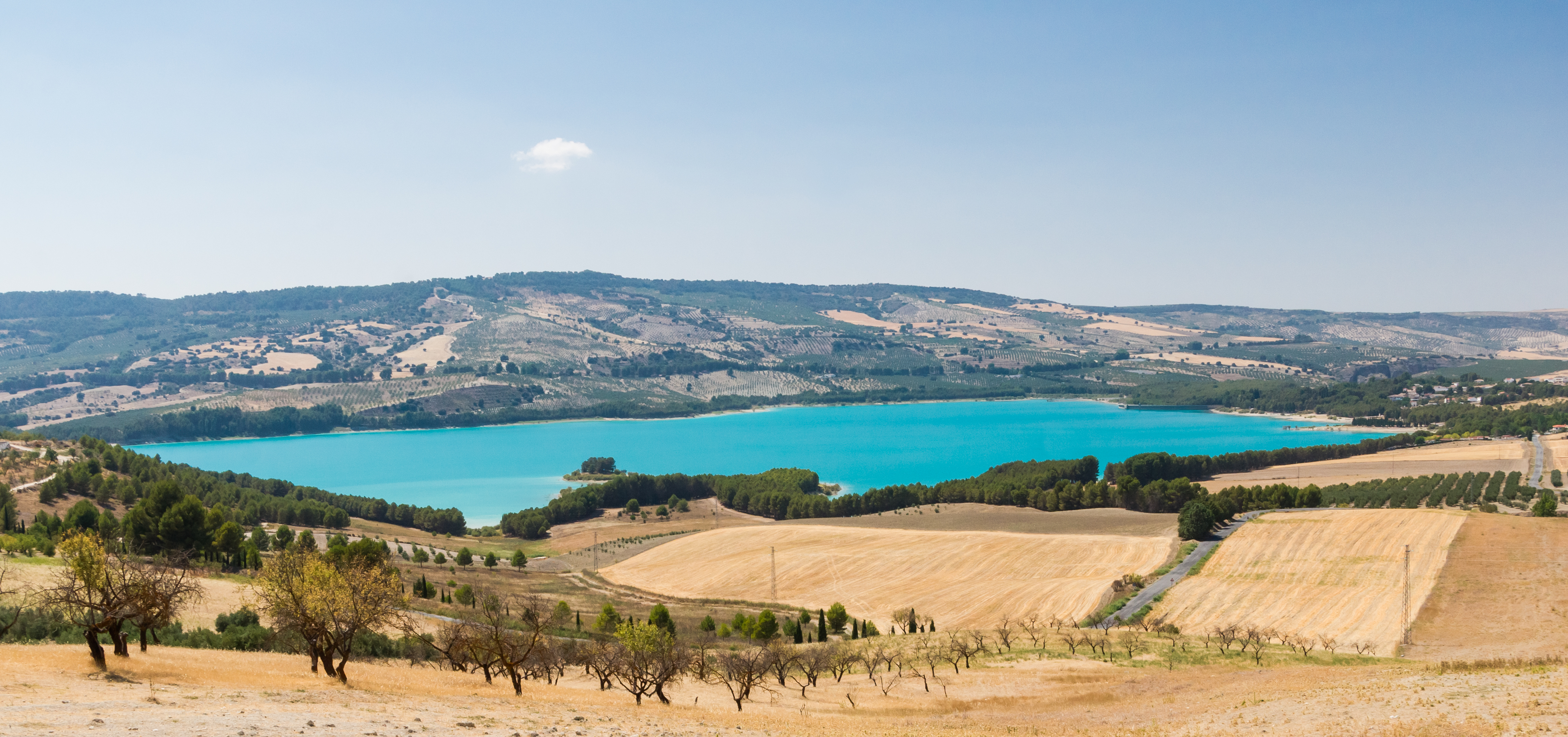

- Location within Andalusia
- Location: Arenas del Rey
- Coordinates: 36°59′2″N 3°53′14″W
- Type: Reservoir
- Primary outflows: Cacín River
- Basin countries: Spain
- Built: 1958

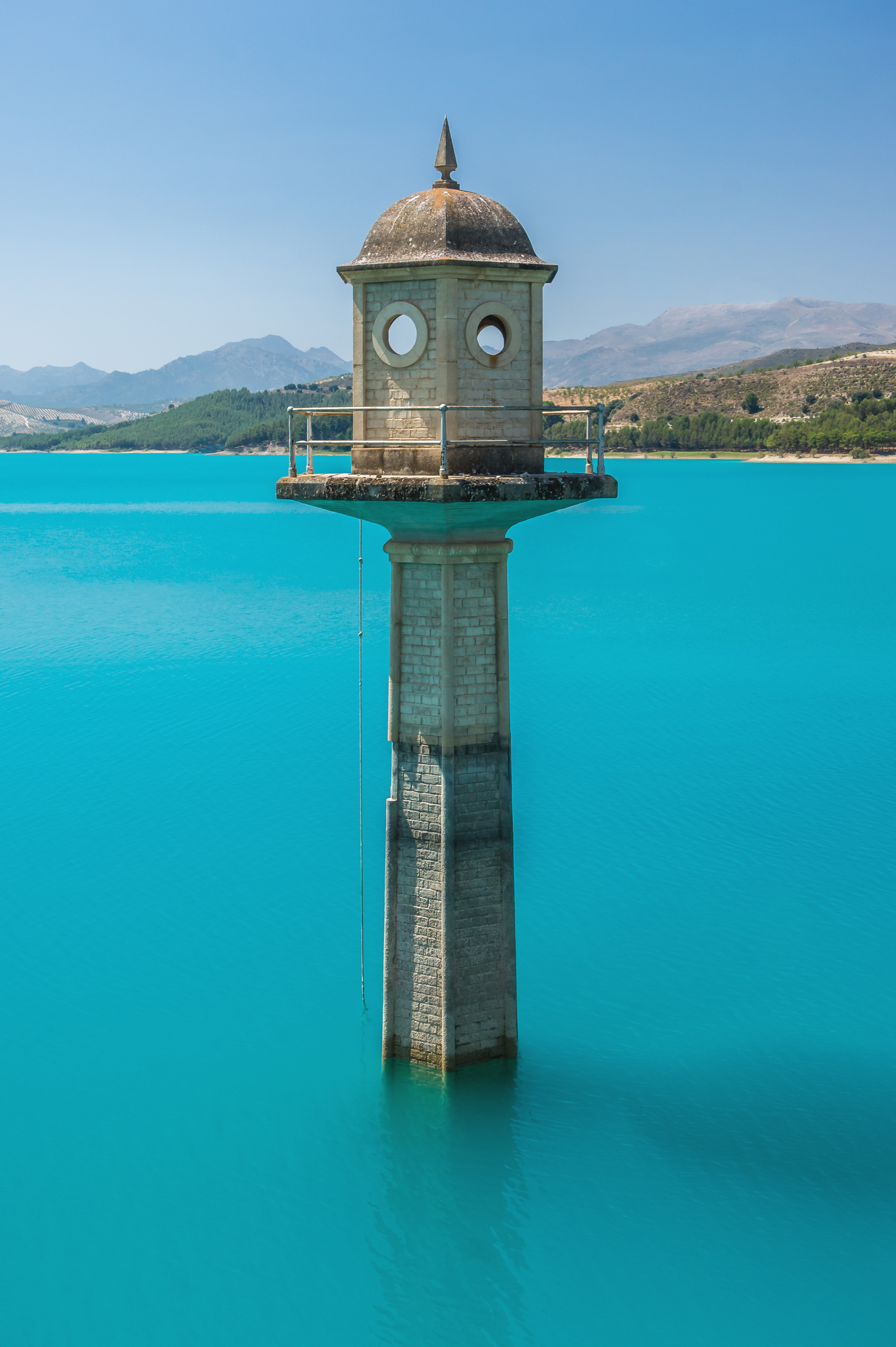
Watch tower near the dam.

Los Bermejales Reservoir (Spanish: Embalse de los Bermejales) is a reservoir in Arenas del Rey, province of Granada, Andalusia, Spain. It is fed by streams from the Sierra de Almijara mountains in the Sierras of Tejeda, Almijara and Alhama Natural Park and is the source of the Cacín River.

== See also ==
- List of reservoirs and dams in Andalusia
