= Alcaucín =

- Municipality and town
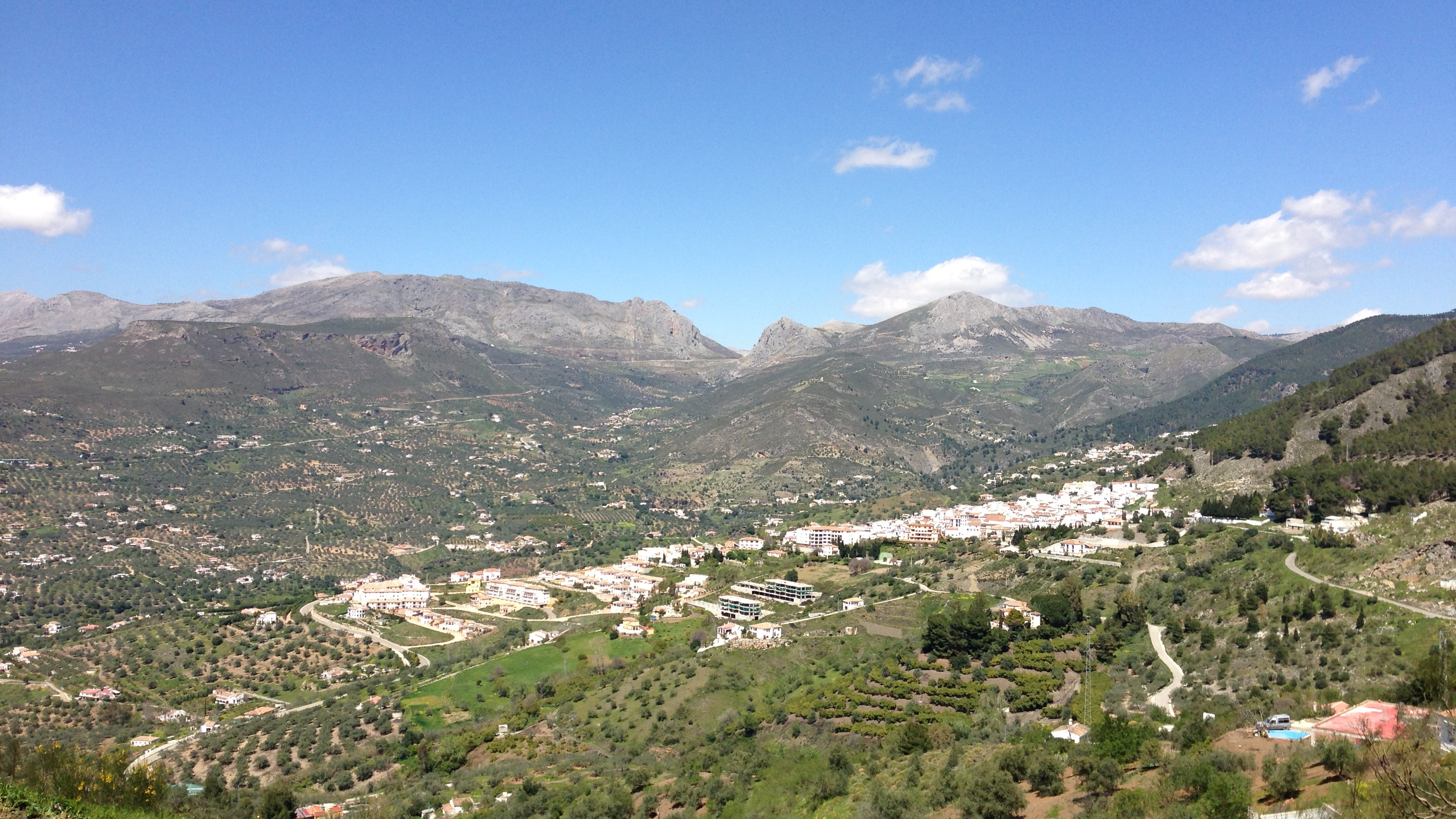

- Flag Coat of arms

- Municipal location in Málaga Province

- Location in Spain
- Coordinates: 36°54′N 4°07′W
- Country: Spain
- Autonomous community: Andalucía
- Province: Málaga Province
- Comarca: Axarquía - Costa del Sol

Area
  - Total: 18 sq mi (46 km^{2})
- Elevation: 1,699 ft (518 m)

Population (2025-01-01)
  - Total: 2,671
  - Density: 117.5/sq mi (45.37/km^{2})
- Time zone: UTC+1 (CET)
  - Summer (DST): UTC+2 (CEST)
- Website: http://www.alcaucin.es

Alcaucin (Spanish pronunciation: [alkawˈθin]) is a town and municipality in the province of Málaga, part of the autonomous community of Andalusia in southern Spain. It borders with the province of Granada. The municipality is situated approximately 54 kilometers to the city of Málaga. It is 507 km from the capital of Madrid. The name was derived from al-kautín, the Arabic of "the arches." It has a population of approximately 1,600 residents, partly living in the hamlet of Puente Don Manuel. Natives of the town are called Alcaucineños and have the nickname of tiznaos.

== Geography ==
The village of Alcaucín extends its lands to the north of the Axarquía, between the mountains of the Sierra de Alhama and Sierra de Tejeda with the corridor of Periana. It includes the "Boquete de Zafarraya" an important mountain pass in the mountainous region of Axarquía. It adjoins the Sierras of Tejeda, Almijara and Alhama Natural Park to the east.

Being in the Sierra de Tejeda, the end is rather abrupt as it passes from the Maroma 2,066 meters to 200 meters in Puente Don Manuel. The surrounding terrain is predominantly dense forest.

=== Flora and fauna ===
In this environment lies one of the richest areas of flora and fauna of the Axarquía. Within the vegetation, the most characteristic feature is the pine forest, which in this case is of Aleppo and is repopulating.

The most common tree species are poplars, cedars, oaks, and cypress. There are terebinth shrub species such as, gorse, jaguarzos, ivy thickets, and vines. Herbs such as thyme, rosemary, palmitos and torviscos can be found here as well.

Closer to the "Senos de la Tejada", the pines are disappearing to make way for size shrub species such as juniper, savin, hawthorn, and yew, which is currently on the decline, although is teem on some cliffs on the north side of Sierra Tejada.

The mountain goat is the most visible animal. The weasel, bobcat, badger, and genet live in these in the areas with the highest density of trees.

Among the birds there are the linnet, blackbird, warbler, redstart, skylark and nightingale.

== History ==
Alcaucín is a name of Arabic origin, derived from al-qawsayn (القوسين) meaning "The Arcs." Some authors hypothesize that the name was due to the existence of an aqueduct and others to the abundance of yew trees, whose wood is used for making hunting bows, which have the form of an arc.

The term city of the municipality is from the areas of Málaga that can testify as the first to be inhabited by man, as documented in the "Boquete de Zafarraya" excavations that state that in 1983 human remains appeared including a jaw, which belonged to a Neanderthal man. During the period of Phoenician colonization, they laid the foundations of the fortress of Zalía, but it was the Arabs who built the present castle in 1485 until it was conquered by the Catholic Monarchs.

During the Andalusian earthquake of 25 December 1884, 134 houses in the municipality collapsed, 22 in the nucleus (6 dead and 5 seriously injured) and 112 in the surrounding area. The rest suffered serious or moderate damage, and there were 3 dead.

== See also ==
- List of municipalities in Málaga
