= Cacín River =

River in Andalusia, Spain

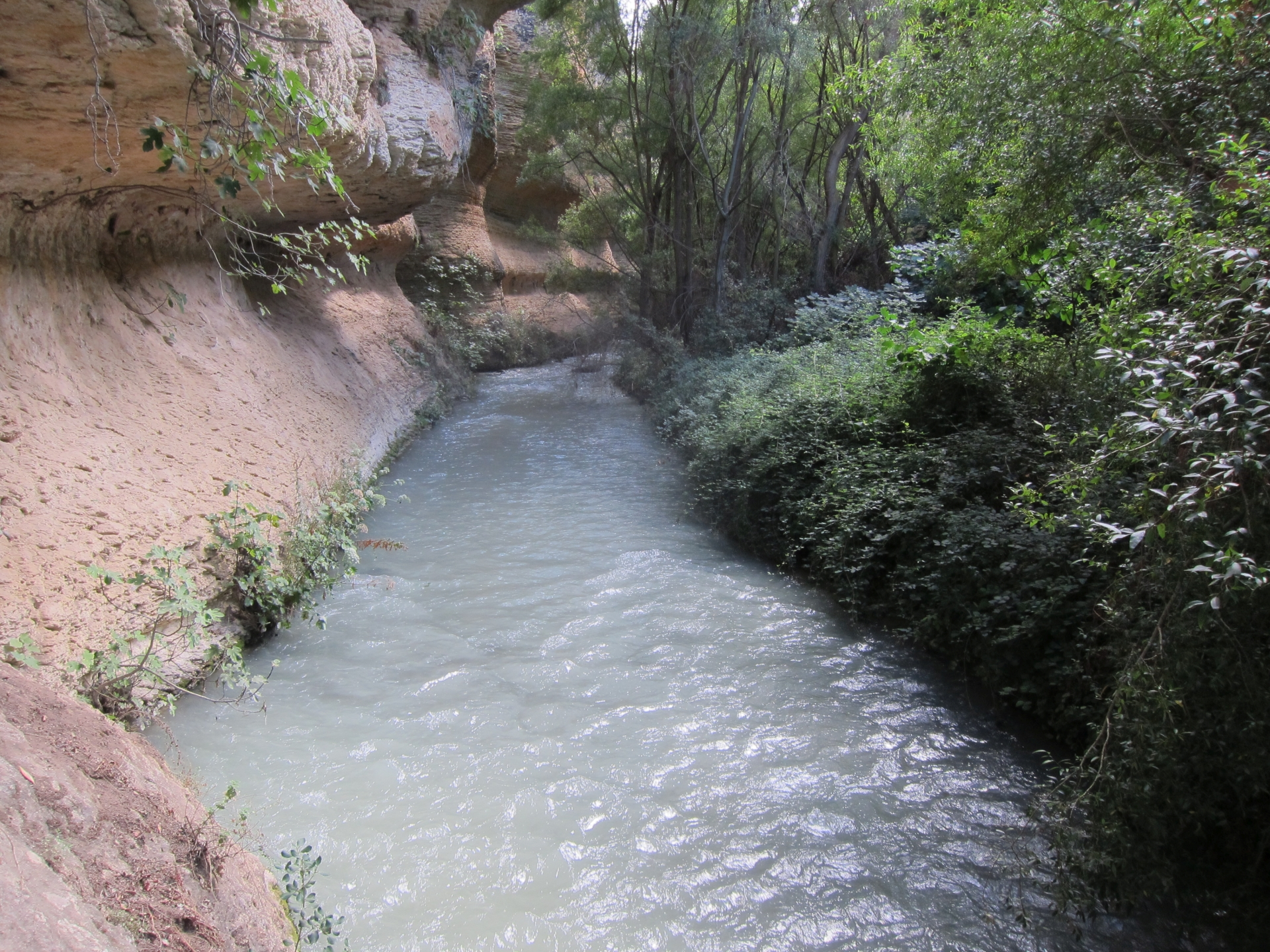
- Cacín River canyon (Tajo de los Bermejales)

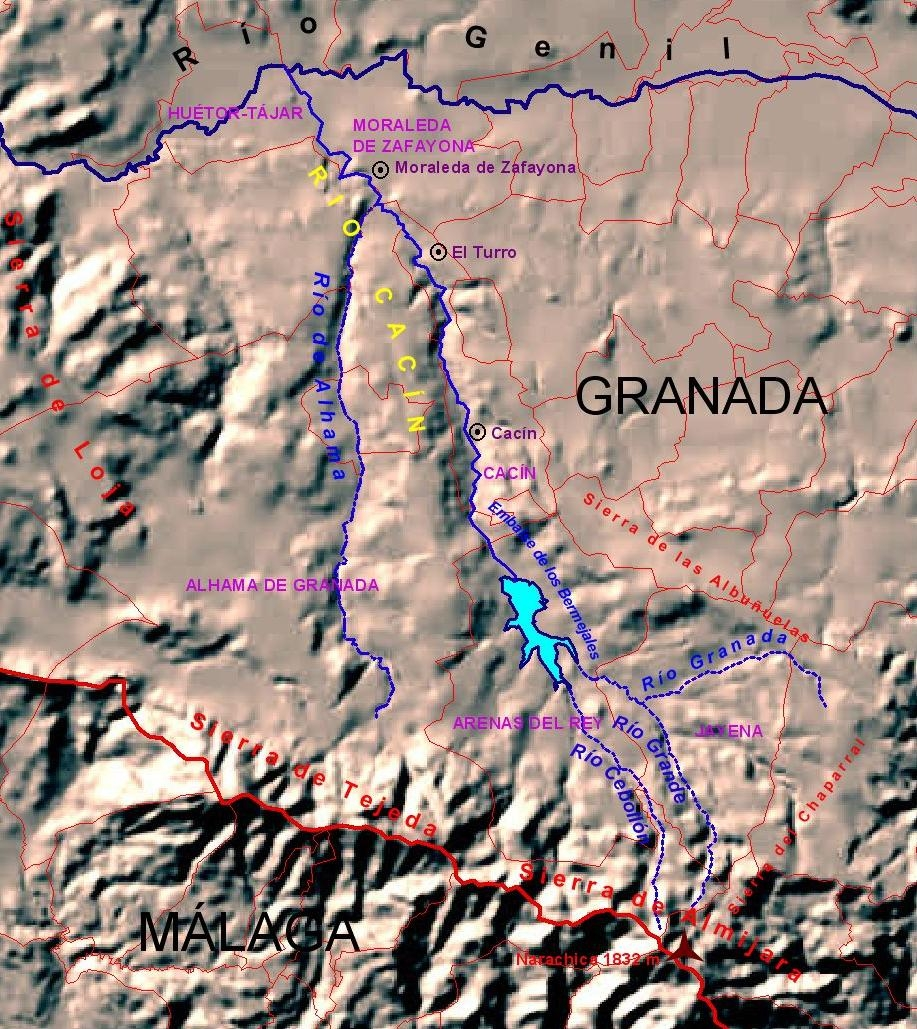
- Cacin flows north from the Bermejales reservoir (light blue) to the Rio Genil (top)

- Location within Spain
- Native name: Río Cacín (Spanish)

Location
- Country: Spain
- Autonomous community: Andalusia
- Province: Granada

Physical characteristics
- Source
  - location: Embalse de los Bermejales
  - coordinates: 36.996925°N 3.893436°W
- Mouth
  - coordinates: 37.212090°N 4.017370°W

Basin features
- River system: Genil

The Cacín River (Spanish: Río Cacín) is a river in Andalusia, Spain. It is supplied by streams flowing north from the Sierra de Almijara and Sierra de Tejeda into the Granada Basin. The river originates in the Los Bermejales Reservoir, and flows north to join the Genil river. In its upper reaches it runs through a deep gorge that holds traces of Paleolithic human occupation.

== Geological history ==
In the latest Tortonian and the middle and late Turolian (9.0–5.3 Ma) the Granada basin was an endorheic basin. Rivers flowed from the east and southwest into a central lake with no exit. During the Pliocene, the western part of the basin was drained by the paleo-Cacín river system, which flowed to the north and then left the basin to the west. Pliocene sediments exposed in the northwest of the Granada basin were washed down by the Cacín from the Alpujarride reliefs of the Almijara/Tejeda massif. The Paleo-Genil or Alhambra system, which was fed by the mountains to the east and a small endorheic lake to the north, confined the eastern portion of the basin.

In the latest Pliocene or earliest Pleistocene, the Genil river changed course to flow west, where it joined the paleo-Cacin system, and the basin became completely exorheic. Before this period the basin had been collecting sediments. Afterwards the main pattern has been erosion.

== Sources ==
The Sierra Almijara and Sierra Tejeda form the southern margin of the western part of the Granada basin, and contain the tributaries of the Cacín river. The Cacín River originates in the Sierra de la Almijara, from an aquifer of Alpujárride Complex limestone in the higher level, with shale and quartzite lower down. There are numerous springs in this area, mostly higher than 1,000 metres (3,300 ft) above sea level. They include Monticana, Cortijo Cabañeros, Las Golondrinas, Agujerillo Caliente, María Santísima and others. Other streams include the Anales, Játar and Jayena. All these small rivers run through wilderness areas of great beauty. Much of the runoff from the north face of the Sierra de la Almijara is collected in the Bermejales reservoir.

== Route ==
The Cacín River forms in what is now the Los Bermejales Reservoir, where several streams from the Sierras of Tejeda, Almijara and Alhama Natural Park converge. It flows north through a narrow canyon known as the Tajos de los Bermejales, where it has drops of 100 metres (330 ft). The Cacín river irrigates the lands of the west of the Vega de Granada comarca. It joins the Genil to the southwest of Villanueva Mesía.

== Tajos de los Bermejales ==
The Tajos de los Bermejales gorge is in the comarca de Alhama, in the municipality of Arenas del Rey. It extends from the Bermejales dam to what is called the Roman bridge, although it was built in the 1940s. It is accessible through a difficult walking trail that includes sections of hanging bridges, ladders and support ropes. The river dug the gorge through sandstones, clays and soft conglomerates in the Quaternary era.

The canyon walls are home to many species of bird, including raptors such as common kestrel (Falco tinnunculus), accipiter and Eurasian eagle-owl (Bubo bubo), colonies of western jackdaw (Coloeus monedula), rock dove (Columba livia), rock thrush (Monticola), wheatear (Oenanthe), bee-eater (Meropidaes), barn swallow (Hirundo rustica) and Eurasian crag martin (Ptyonoprogne rupestris). The Southeastern Spanish ibex (Capra pyrenaica hispanica) may also be seen in the gorge.

== Neolithic inhabitants ==
Neolithic people lived in the canyon 5,000 years ago, sheltering under its overhanging walls and using the river as source of food. There are traces of these early settlers on the canyon walls about 10 metres (33 ft) above the present river level. Some of the walls they built to enclose the cavities in the canyon wall are still visible. At that time the canyon was not so deep, and stairways and ladders were used to reach the dwellings, which were built high for defensive reasons. A clay vessel known as the Olla de Cacín (Cacín Pot) was found in the river bed and is preserved in the National Archaeological Museum, Madrid. It is the most southern example of Cardium pottery in Europe.

== Sources ==
- Castillo, A., Nacimientos del Río Cacín (in Spanish), Instituto del Agua de la Universidad de Granada
- Enrique Gómez, Juan; Calle, Merche S. (18 September 2012), "Los Cañones del río Cacín", Ideal (in Spanish) – via Waste
- García Alix, Antonio; Minwer Barakat, Raef; Martín, José M.; Martín Suárez, Elvira; Freudenthal, Matthijs (July–August 2009), "Dating The Change From Endorheic To Exorheic Conditions In The Drainage System Of The Granada Basin (Southern Spain)", PALAIOS, 24 (7/8), SEPM Society for Sedimentary Geology: 544–549, Bibcode:2009Palai..24..544G, doi:10.2110/palo.2009.p09-015r, JSTOR 40606444
