= Otívar =

Coordinates: 36°49′N 3°41′W

Otívar, Spain
- village
- Flag Coat of arms

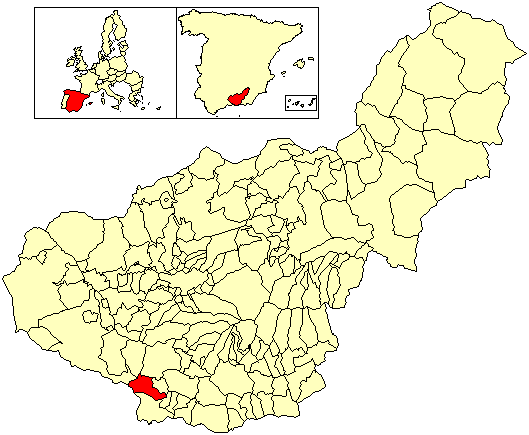
- Location of Otívar
- Country: Spain
- Province: Granada
- Municipality: Otívar

Area
  - Total: 57 km^{2} (22 sq mi)

Population (2025-01-01)
  - Total: 1,011
  - Density: 18/km^{2} (46/sq mi)
- Time zone: UTC+1 (CET)
  - Summer (DST): UTC+2 (CEST)

Otívar is a municipality located at 267.80 metres above sea level in the Province of Granada, Spain. According to the 2004 census (INE), the village has a population of 1,113 inhabitants.

Agriculture is Otívar's predominant economic activity (mainly tropical fruit) however, due to the dramatic scenery of the surrounding mountains, a number of northern Europeans have discovered its charms and either take rural holidays here, or in a few cases have settled here and integrated with the local population. The Sierras of Tejeda, Almijara and Alhama Natural Park are just west of the town.

Otívar contains a cross between a subtropical micro climate and a coastal mediterranean climate, creating a perfect environment for the famous "Níspero" known in English as the "loquat". The average yearly temperature is 14.80 °C (degrees Celsius). In the warmer months the average temperature is 28,80 °C (degrees Celsius) and in the colder months the average temperature is 4,50 °C (degrees Celsius).

The current mayor is Francisco Robles Carrascosa, from the political party of PP. This is the second consecutive term the mayor has won, after the PSOE´s defeat four years ago.

== See also ==
- List of municipalities in Granada
