= Puente Don Manuel =

Coordinates: 36.890°N 4.146°W

Puente Don Manuel is a hamlet in the municipality of Alcaucín in the province of Málaga in the autonomous community of Andalusia in southern Spain. The hamlet has English shops, because a lot of English immigrants live in this region.
