= Salares =

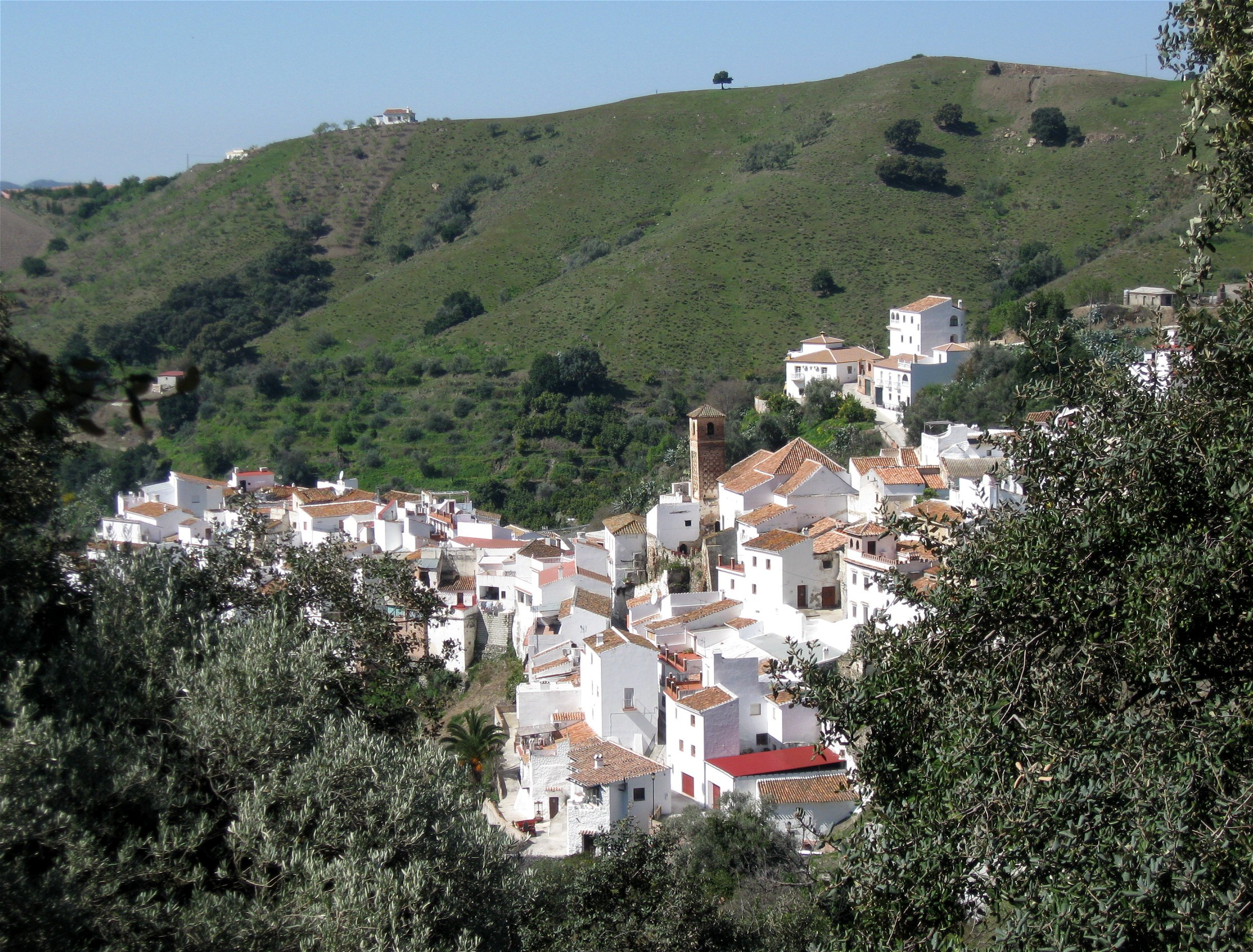

- Coat of arms

- Location in Spain.
- Coordinates: 36°51′N 4°01′W
- Sovereign state: Spain
- Autonomous community: Andalusia
- Province: Málaga

Area
  - Total: 10 km^{2} (3.9 sq mi)
- Elevation: 571 m (1,873 ft)

Population (2025-01-01)
  - Total: 194
  - Density: 19/km^{2} (50/sq mi)
- Time zone: UTC+1 (CET)
  - Summer (DST): UTC+2 (CEST)
- Website: www.salares.es

Salares is a town and municipality in the province of Málaga, part of the autonomous community of Andalusia in southern Spain. It belongs to the comarca of La Axarquía. The Sierras of Tejeda, Almijara and Alhama Natural Park is just east of the village. The municipality is situated approximately 58 kilometres from the city of Málaga and 28 from Vélez-Málaga. It has a population of approximately 200 residents. The natives are called Salareños.

== See also ==
- List of municipalities in Málaga
