= Sedella =

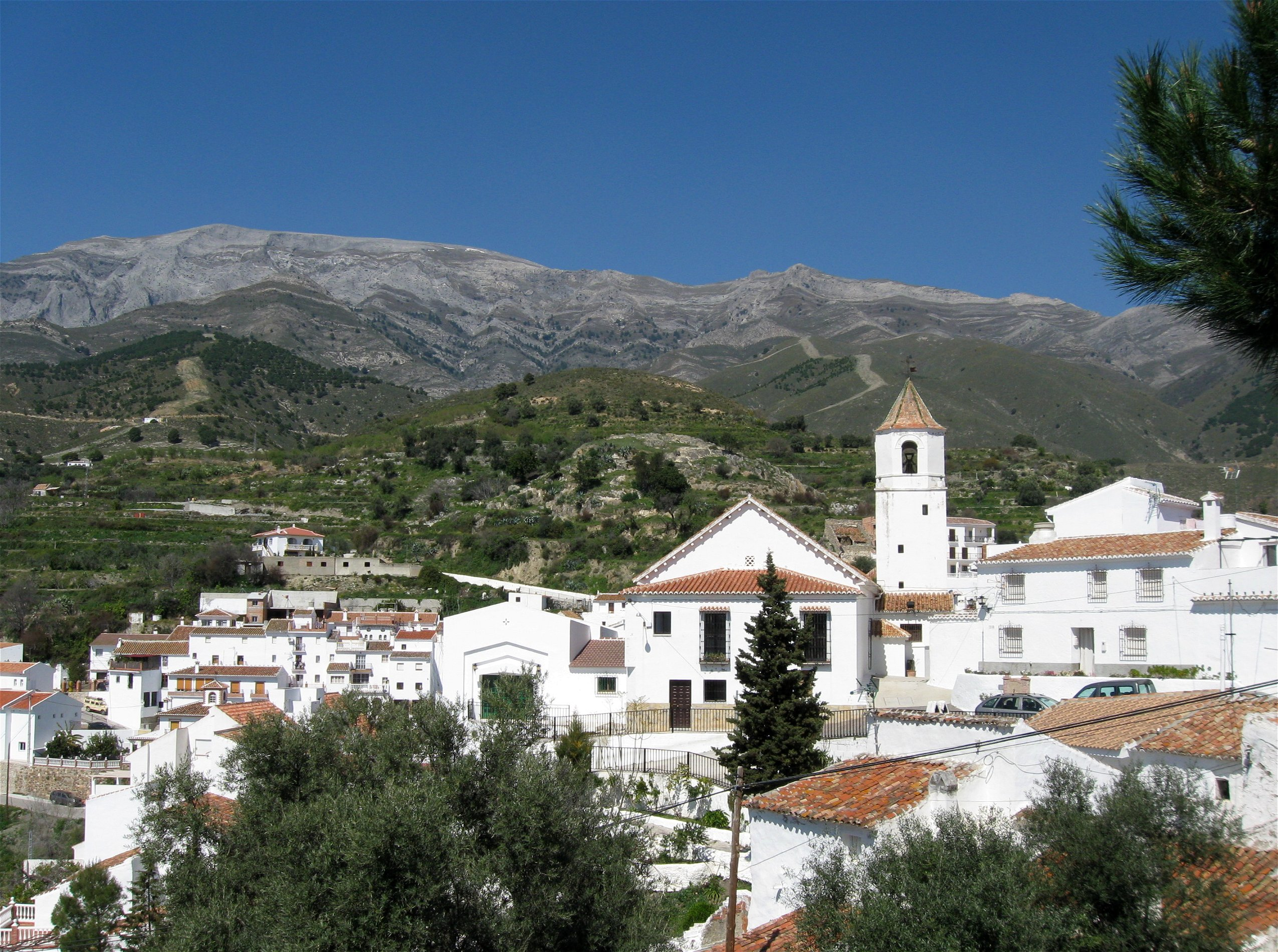
- View of Sedella

- Flag Coat of arms

- Location in Spain.
- Coordinates: 36.850°N 4.033°W
- Sovereign state: Spain
- Autonomous community: Andalusia
- Province: Málaga

Area
  - Total: 31.62 km^{2} (12.21 sq mi)
- Elevation: 646 m (2,119 ft)

Population (2025-01-01)
  - Total: 607
  - Density: 19.2/km^{2} (49.7/sq mi)
- Time zone: UTC+1 (CET)
  - Summer (DST): UTC+2 (CEST)
- Website: www.sedella.es

Sedella is a town and municipality in the province of Málaga, part of the autonomous community of Andalusia in southern Spain. The municipality is situated approximately 54 kilometres from the provincial capital of Málaga, 23 from Vélez-Málaga and 8 from Canillas de Aceituno. The Sierras of Tejeda, Almijara and Alhama Natural Park is just north of the village.

Sedella has a population of approximately 500 residents. The natives are called Sedellanos. The Patron Saint is St Andrew the Apostle. The village church has a bell tower dating back to Moorish time. Other signs of Moorish origin can also be found in one of the last bastions of the Moors. Sedella is also the Center for the Nature Park of Sierra Tejeda and Almijara with a Visitor Centre. The annual summer fiesta is in honour of the Virgin Mary of Esperanza (Hope).

== See also ==
- List of municipalities in Málaga
