= Canillas de Aceituno =

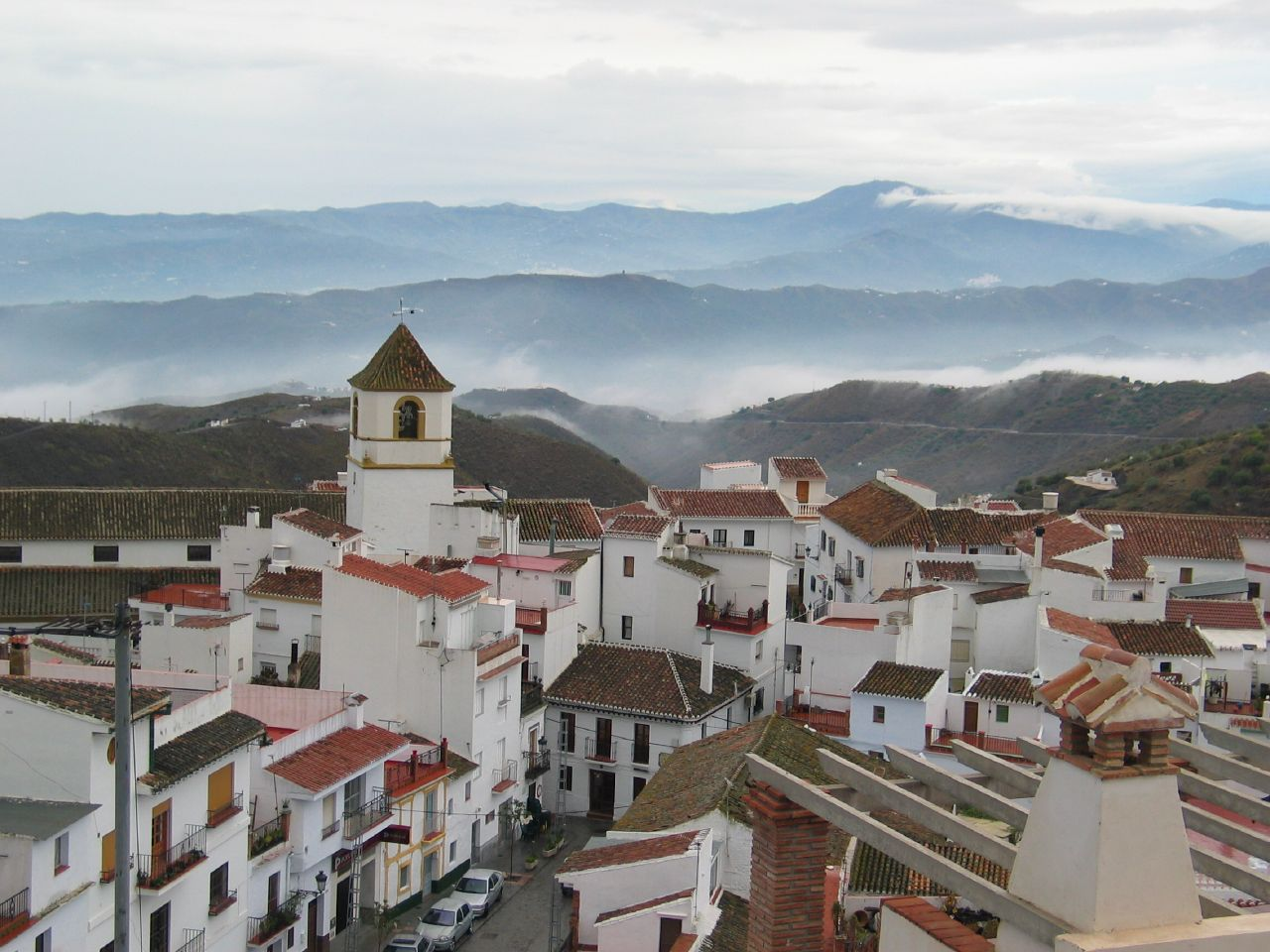

- Flag Coat of arms

- Location in Andalusia Canillas de Aceituno (Andalusia) Canillas de Aceituno (Spain)
- Coordinates: 36°52′N 4°04′W
- Sovereign state: Spain
- Autonomous community: Andalusia
- Province: Málaga
- Comarca: Axarquía

Government
  - PP: Vicente Campos

Area
  - Total: 42 km^{2} (16 sq mi)
- Elevation: 649 m (2,129 ft)

Population (2024)
  - Total: 1,761
  - Density: 42/km^{2} (110/sq mi)
- Demonym: Canillero
- Time zone: UTC+1 (CET)
  - Summer (DST): UTC+2 (CEST)

Canillas de Aceituno is a municipality in the province of Málaga in the autonomous community of Andalusia in southern Spain. It is located in the east of the province and is one of the municipalities comprising the comarca of Axarquia and the judicial district of Vélez-Málaga. It is a small village, located at the foot of the "La Maroma" mountains in Spain.

Canillas de Aceituno has an altitude of around 524 meters at the foot of the Sierra de Tejeda and is crowned by the peak of La Maroma at 2,068 meters, the highest in the province. It is a town of narrow streets that are immaculately whitewashed, Moorish arches and corners of flowers.

The people of Canillas de Aceituno called canilleros. Most have their profession within the town, although there are some people who work outside. They typically work in construction and agriculture. Canillas de Aceituno has shops where one can purchase basic products.

Canillas de Aceituno is 61 kilometers from Málaga. It is accessible through the highway C-335 and the local M-125 from Vélez-Málaga.

== Geography ==
The geographic location of Canillas de Aceituno makes it a natural balcony of Axarquia. It adjoins the Sierras of Tejeda, Almijara and Alhama Natural Park to the north. The road to the village offers views of the Velez and Rubite valleys, through a landscape of olive plantations, vineyards, almond and fig trees. On the hills or mountains one can see the awnings ready to dry the grapes for raisins. This tree abundance is made possible by the Almanchares, Bermuza and Rubite rivers, which also facilitate the existence of natural springs such as the Gazuela and the Ivy. In the environment of Canillas is abundant with natural caves highlighted by the Fajara, four kilometers from the villa, in whose interior are the tunnels up until a kilometer and a half.

Inside the village there are two natural springs that feed on an Arab cistern located under the city council. One of the streets of archaeological interest is the Castillo street, which there are still remains of what was once an ancient fortress and leading to a lower neighborhood, through Estación street. The Cemetery street lies above an old Arab cemetery.

During the Andalusian earthquake of 25 December 1884 15% of houses collapsed and 65% were badly damaged. There were 6 dead, 4 seriously injured and more than 30 minor injuries. The upper neighborhood suffered major damage, although there were no fatalities in it.

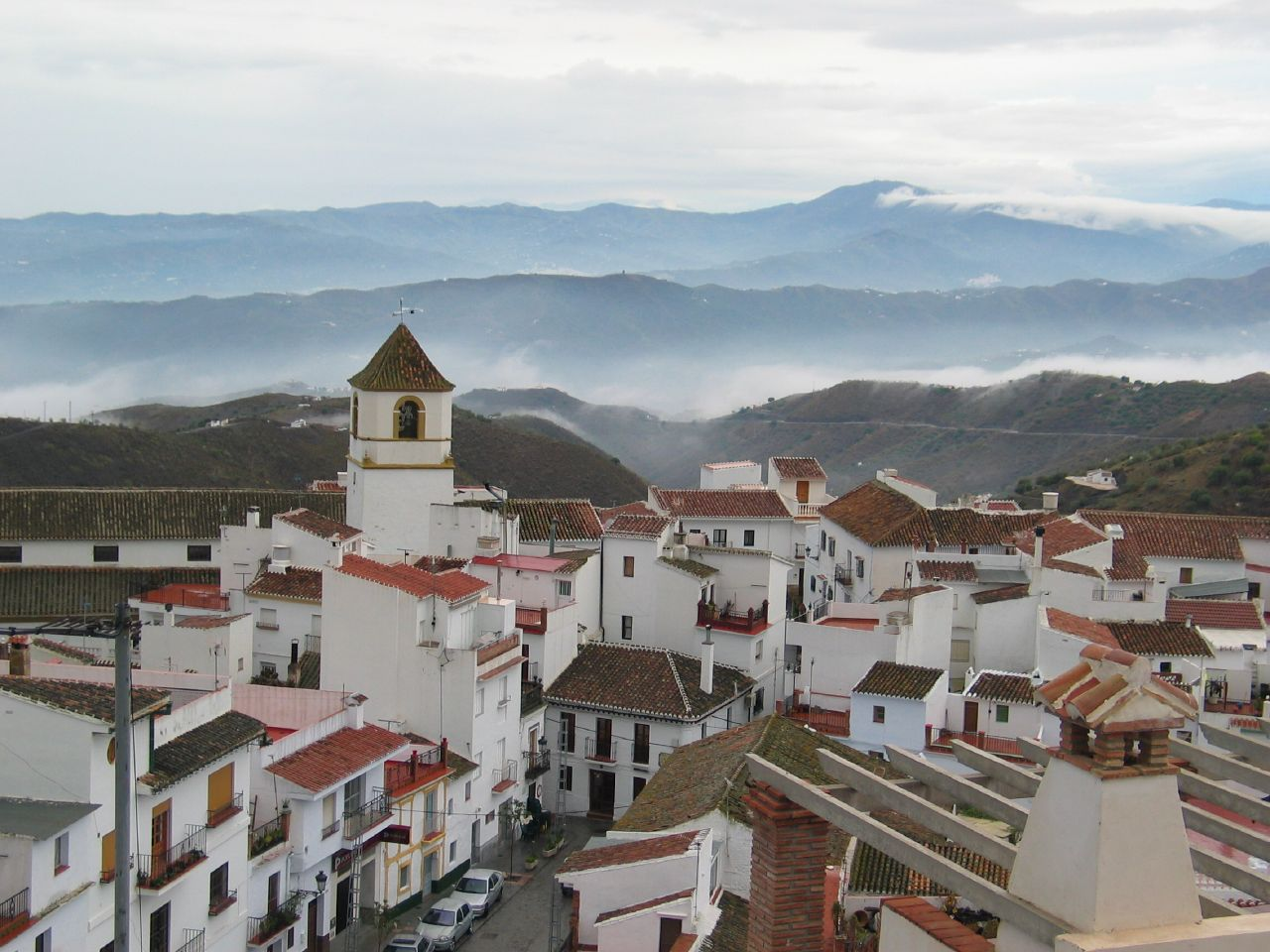
View of Canillas de Aceituno

== Name ==
The village's name comes from the Latin "Cannillae" (the zone of cane plantations) and the Arab word "Azeytuni" (woven and dyed silks).

== Living conditions ==
The municipality of Canillas de Aceituno has an area of 42km^{2}. The population center is located at an altitude of 645 meters, and the annual average temperature is 17 °C (63 °F). It has a population of 1,761 inhabitants.

== See also ==
- List of municipalities in Málaga
