= Canillas de Río Tuerto =

- Municipality
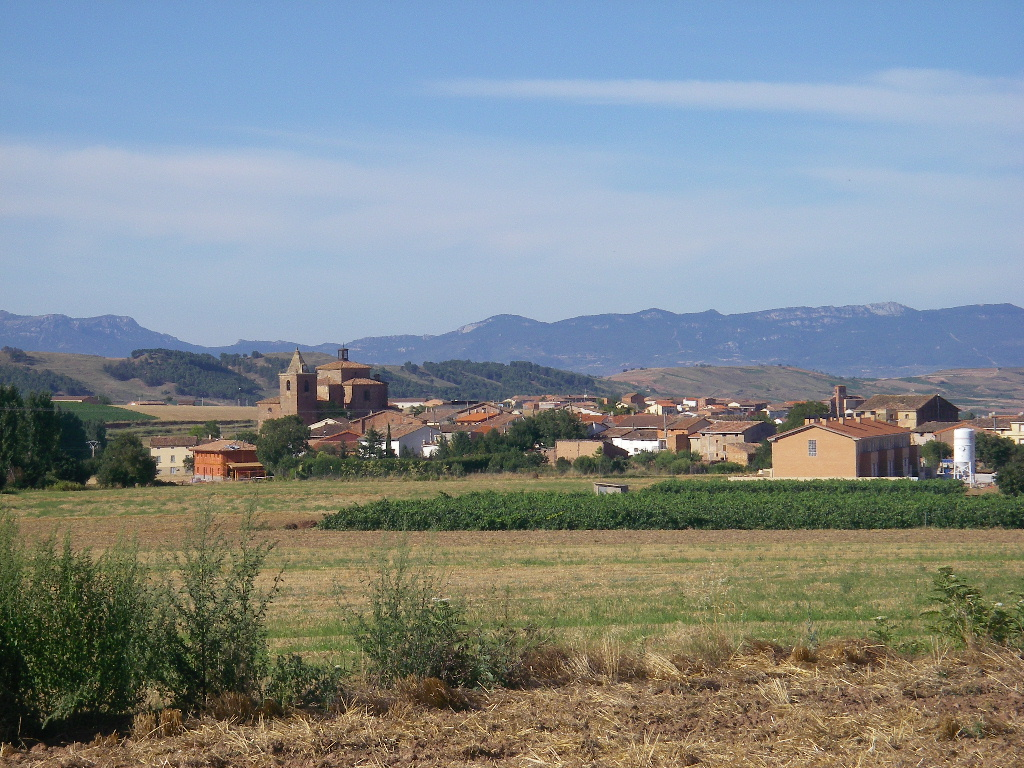

- Location within La Rioja, Spain Location within Spain
- Coordinates: 42°23′54″N 2°50′25″W
- Country: Spain
- Autonomous community: La Rioja
- Comarca: Nájera

Government
  - Alcalde: Francisco Guillermo Martínez Ortega (PSOE)

Area
  - Total: 3.6 km^{2} (1.4 sq mi)
- Elevation: 624 m (2,047 ft)

Population (2025-01-01)
  - Total: 43
  - Density: 12/km^{2} (31/sq mi)
- Postal code: 26325
- Website: Official website

Canillas de Río Tuerto is a village in the province and autonomous community of La Rioja, Spain. The municipality covers an area of 3.6 square kilometres (1.4 sq mi) and as of 2011 had a population of 42 people.
