= Frigiliana =

- Municipality
- View of Frigiliana

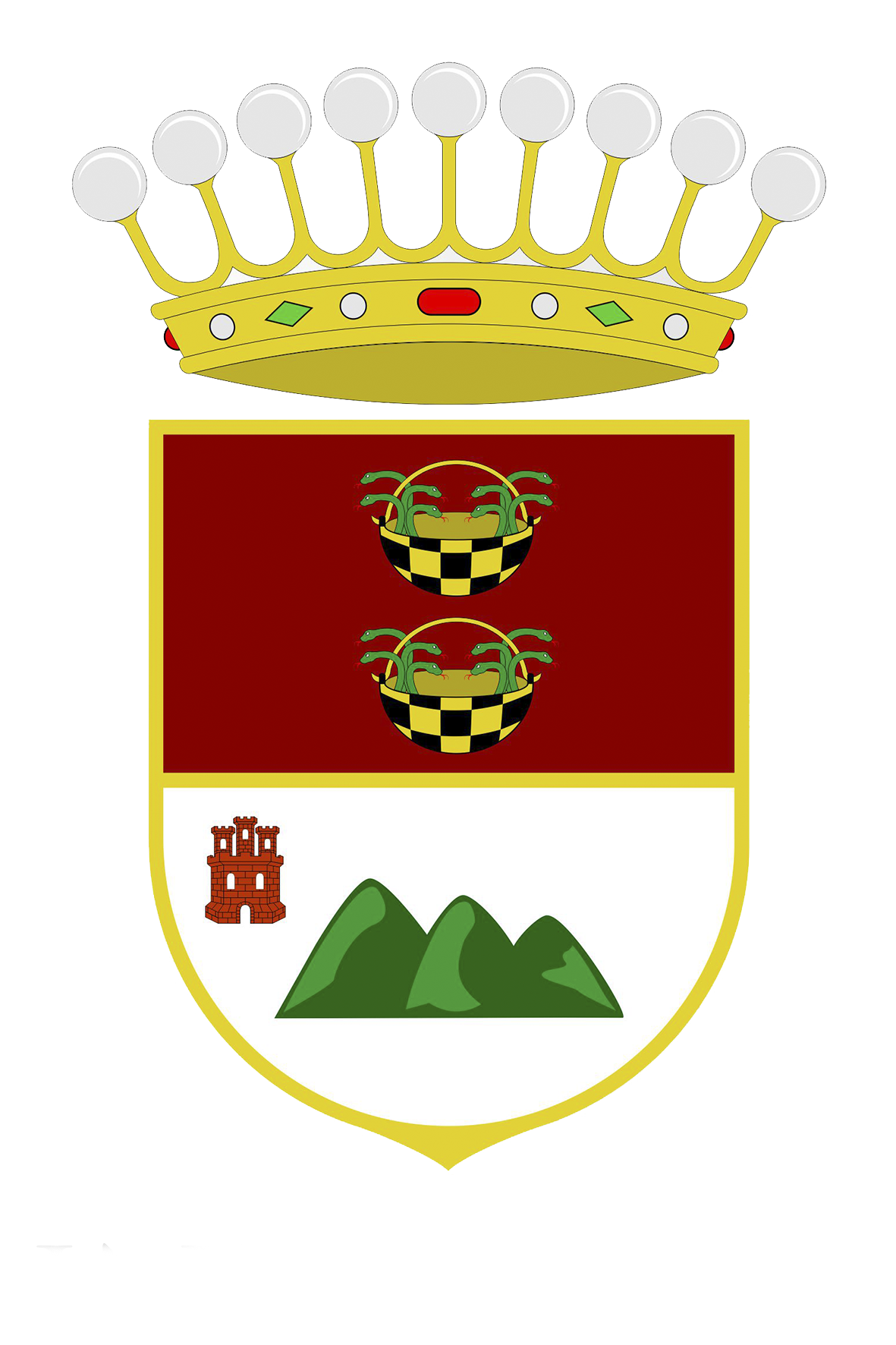
- Coat of arms

- Location in Spain Frigiliana (Andalusia) Frigiliana (Spain)
- Coordinates: 36°47′N 3°54′W
- Country: Spain
- Autonomous community: Andalucía
- Province: Málaga
- Comarca: Axarquía - Costa del Sol

Government
  - Mayor: Alejandro Herrero Platero

Area
  - Total: 41 km^{2} (16 sq mi)
- Elevation: 320 m (1,050 ft)

Population (2025-01-01)
  - Total: 3,383
  - Density: 83/km^{2} (210/sq mi)
- Demonym(s): Frigilianenses, Aguanosos
- Time zone: UTC+1 (CET)
  - Summer (DST): UTC+2 (CEST)

Frigiliana (Spanish pronunciation: [fɾixiˈljana]) is a town and municipality in the province of Málaga, part of the autonomous community of Andalusia in southern Spain. The municipality is situated approximately 71 kilometers east of Málaga, the provincial capital, and approximately 6 kilometers north of Nerja. It is located in the comarca of La Axarquía, the easternmost region of the province, and integrated into the judicial district of Torrox.

== History ==
Prehistory

Around 3000 BC, towards the end of the Neolithic period, primitive humans lived in caves and rocky shelters in these areas, later becoming sedentary. In Frigiliana, northwest of the urban center, there is an important menhir that, due to its characteristics, can be attributed to the El Argar culture.

Ancient Age

Phoenician colonizers left a Paleo-Punic necropolis of burial mounds from the 7th century BC on the primitive Cerrillo del Tejar, now known as Cerrillo de las Sombras, of which the necropolis remains. Outside these sites, coins from Phoenician and Roman times have also been found, such as those discovered on Cerrillo del Tejar in 1965.

The town's name likely originates from the Roman era. It is assumed that "Frigiliana" derives from the union of Frexinius (a Roman figure about whom nothing is known) and the suffix -ana, which, combined with the patronymic, could mean "villa," "farm," or "place of Frexinius." Another plausible toponymy links it to the Greek region of Phrygia in Anatolia (modern-day Turkey), conquered around 1200 BC by Indo-European peoples. The cult of Cybele, introduced by Celts in eastern Phrygia, spread widely. Despite the economic dominance of coastal Gaditan industries (e.g., Conil, Zahara de los Atunes) under the monopoly of the Medina Sidonia family (evident in Frigiliana’s coat of arms with cauldrons and snakes, symbols of the Duchy of Medinaceli), traditional tuna fishing (almadrabas) originated from Greek culture on the Iberian coast. Thus, "Frigiliana" etymologically translates to "belonging to Phrygia." This inland town processed and distributed tuna from the nearby coastal enclave of Nerja (6 km away).

In the early 5th century, the Roman fort in Frigiliana was partially destroyed by the Vandals. According to Pliny the Elder, extensive vineyards likely dominated agriculture here, later replaced by tropical fruit cultivation.

Middle Ages

In 711, with the Berber commander Tariq ibn Ziyad landing at Gibraltar, the Muslim conquest began, bringing the region under Islamic rule. Arabs introduced agricultural innovations, including hydraulic systems of irrigation channels and reservoirs still in use today, as well as new crops like sugarcane.

By the late 9th century, an Arab castle spanning 4,000 m² was built, supplied with water via an aqueduct. It was destroyed by Christian forces in 1569 after the surrender of Morisco rebels (Muslims forced to convert) who had fled from Alpujarra and Vélez. Moriscos were expelled to Extremadura and Zamora, and Frigiliana was repopulated with Old Christians from Granada and Valencia. Only foundation remnants and part of the access ramp remain of the castle. A small Jewish and converso presence is also documented. The town's "Three Cultures" heritage (Christian, Muslim, Jewish) is symbolized by a fountain in Calle del Inquisidor featuring a cross, crescent moon, and Star of David.

In 1982, twelve ceramic panels were installed in the Moorish quarter depicting the Morisco rebellion and the Battle of Peñón de Frigiliana.

Modern Age

In the late 16th century, the Manrique de Lara family, Málagan nobles and lords of Frigiliana since 1508, built the Renaissance-style Ingenio (or Palace of the Counts), partially using materials from the Arab castle. Today, it houses Europe’s only active sugarcane honey factory. They also constructed the Palacio del Apero, now the Town Hall, Tourism Office, and Municipal Library.

On May 24, 1640, Philip IV granted Frigiliana the title of Villa, making it independent from Vélez-Málaga. The municipal term was established, along with a council and census recording 160 inhabitants. The lords built the Fuente Vieja (Old Fountain), adorned with their coat of arms.

In 1676, the parish church, funded by Manrique de Lara and designed by architect Bernardo de Godoy, was completed. It features a Latin cross layout and Renaissance style. The 18th century saw parish priest Bernardo de Rojas y Sandoval regulating local brotherhoods and founding pious works. The Catastro de la Ensenada (1752) documented Frigiliana’s sugar mill, paper factory, and sugarcane plantations.

19th Century

During the Napoleonic Wars, guerrilla priest Antonio Muñoz became notable. French troops hanged villagers at La Horca ("The Gallows") in retaliation for disappeared soldiers. By 1812, French forces had left. In 1833, Frigiliana officially became part of Málaga province. The sugar industry thrived along the Río Mármol, though vineyards were devastated by phylloxera in the late 1800s, ruining many families.

20th Century

Early 20th-century progress included electrification (1900s), but economic crises led to protests for "bread and work." The 1920s brought earthquakes and a devastating hurricane (1928). The Ingenio San Raimundo was acquired in 1928 to produce sugarcane honey. Political turmoil preceded the Spanish Civil War; post-war, Frigiliana won multiple beautification awards (1961–1988).

21st Century

El Acebuchal, depopulated during the Civil War, was revitalized.

== Moorish-Mudéjar district ==
This is the old district inhabited by the Moors before and after the Reconquista. Its name Mudéjar is used to describe the architectural style used by Muslim craftsmen working in Christian territory. The quarter is made up of steep cobbled alleyways winding past white houses resplendent with flowers.

== Culture ==
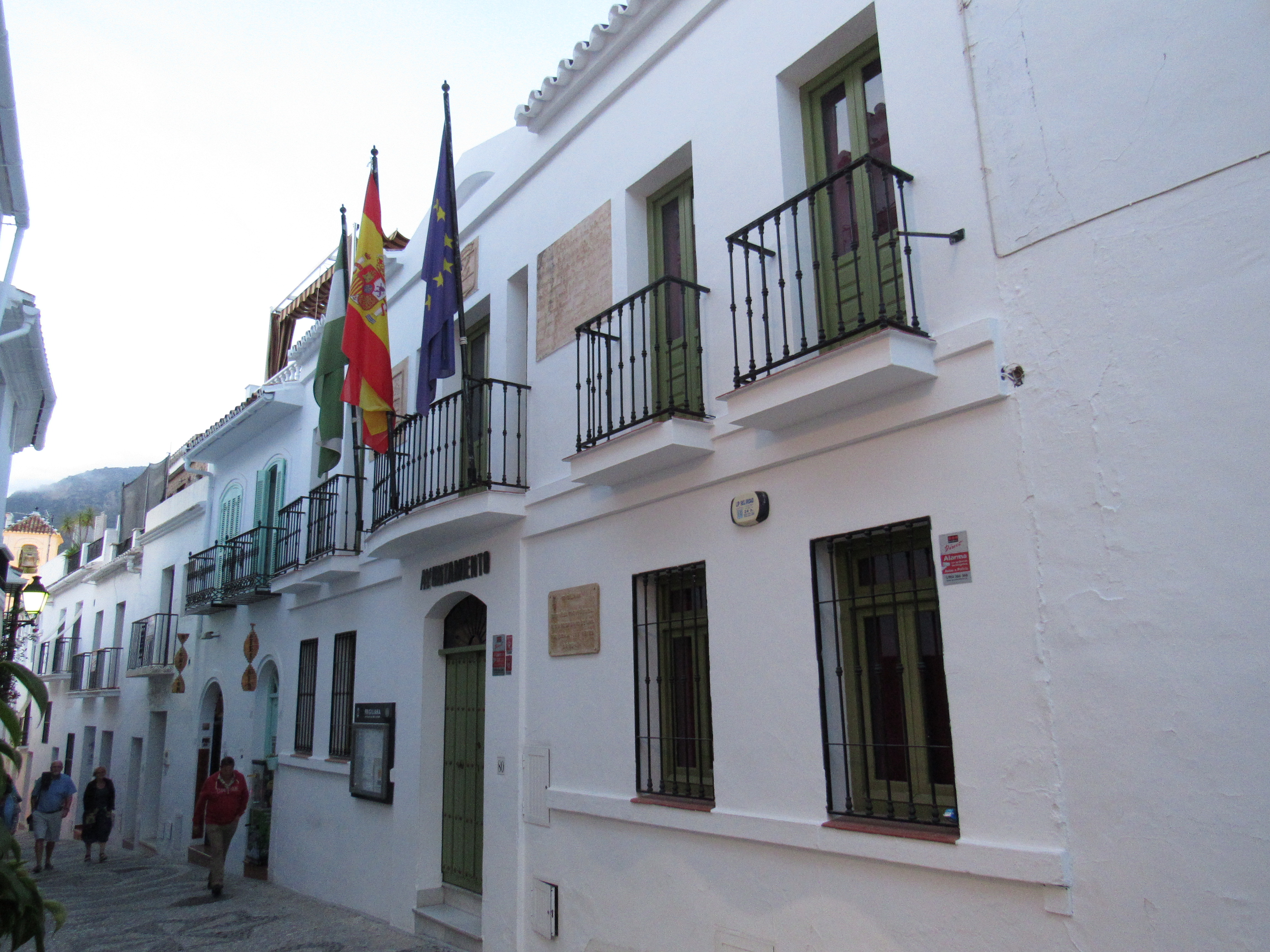
Town hall

For four days at the end of August each year, Frigiliana hosts the Festival of the Three Cultures (Festival de las Tres Culturas), celebrating the region's historic confluence and co-existence of Christian, Muslim and Jewish traditions.

Frigiliana has been recognised as "Spain's most beautiful and well-preserved village" on several occasions, and is known as a "white village".

Frigiliana is referenced in the Irish song, 'Lisdoonvarna' by Christy Moore:

"Summer comes around each year,
We go there and they come here.
Some jet off to … Frigiliana,
But I always go to Lisdoonvarna."

Another important event in Frigiliana is the Sugar Cane Honey Festival, celebrated on the first week of May. On this day, you can visit the Palacio de los Condes de Frigiliana, a building that became Europe's first sugar cane honey factory.

The town hall also organises live concerts and performances and offers free food. Many of these dishes contain the star ingredient of Frigiliana: sugar cane honey.

== Tourism ==
Frigiliana is just west of the vast Sierras of Tejeda, Almijara and Alhama Natural Park, which is home to several hiking trails. The village also holds a vast array of events, the most popular of which being the "Festival de las tres culturas", or the three cultures festival, which takes place on the last weekend of each August. The festival includes countless live performances on the main stage along with street performers all around the streets of the village. Also a popular part of the festival is "la ruta de la tapa" or tapas route, the completion of which earns the entrant a free t-shirt.

== See also ==
- List of municipalities in Málaga
