= La Maroma =

Mountain in Spain

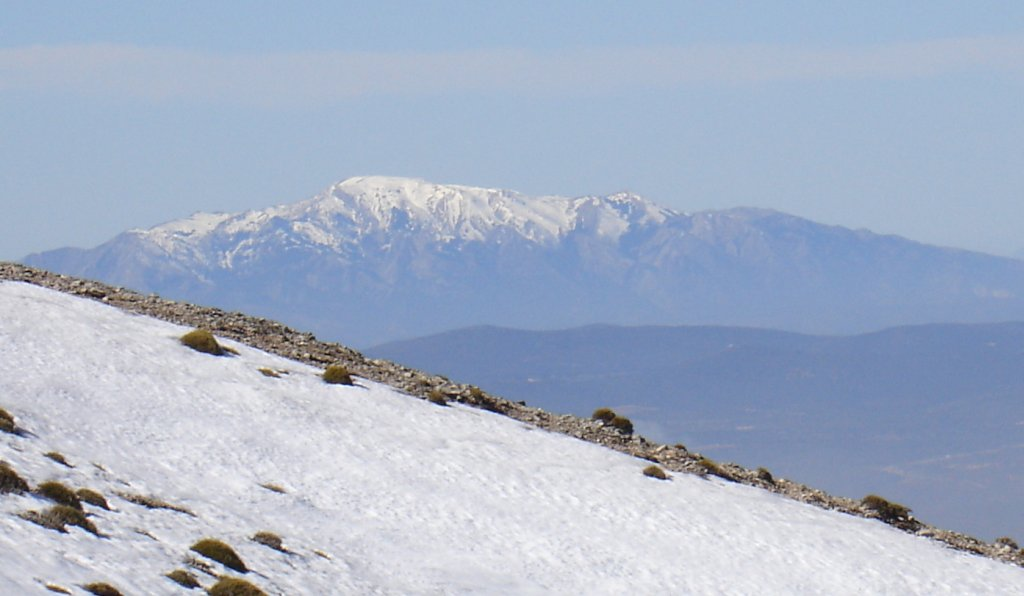
- View of La Maroma in the winter

Highest point
- Elevation: 2,069 m (6,788 ft)
- Prominence: 1238
- Listing: Ribu
- Coordinates: 36°54′07″N 04°02′40″W

Geography
- Location within Spain
- Location: Axarquía, Andalusia
- Parent range: Sierra de Tejeda

Climbing
- Easiest route: From the Área Recreativa de El Alcázar, Alcaucín

La Maroma, also known as Tejeda, at an altitude of 2069 m, is the highest peak of the Sierra de Tejeda, Penibaetic System, Spain. The summit is located in the region of Axarquía on the border between the provinces of Granada and Málaga.

The name La Maroma ("The Rope") comes from a rope used to descend to an ancient ice house located close to the summit. This mountain is in the Sierras of Tejeda, Almijara and Alhama Natural Park.
