= Sierra de Alhama =

Mountain range in Málaga and Granada provinces, Andalusia, Spain

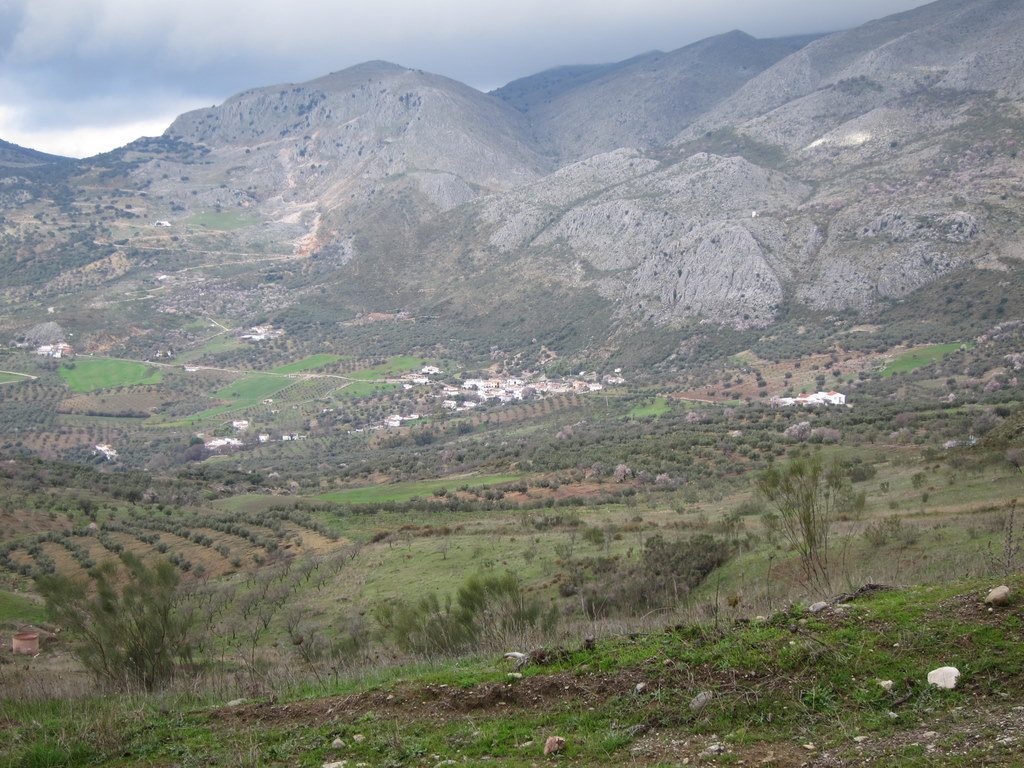
- View of the Sierra de Alhama

Highest point
- Peak: Pico de la Torca
- Elevation: 1,500 m (4,900 ft)
- Coordinates: 36°57′0″N 04°07′0″W

Geography
- Location within Spain
- Location: Málaga and Granada provinces, Andalusia
- Country: Spain
- Parent range: Penibaetic System

Geology
- Orogeny: Alpine orogeny
- Rock type: Karstic

Sierra de Alhama is a mountain range of the Penibaetic System in Málaga and Granada provinces, Andalusia, Spain. Its highest point is the 1,500 m high Pico de la Torca. Other notable summits are Hoyo del Toro, 1,353 m, Cerro de Marchamonas, 1,272 m and Morrón de la Cuna 1,222 m.

== Geography ==
This karstic mountain range is part of the ranges in the interior area of Axarquia. It stretches between the Sierra del Jobo and the 1,040 m high Puerto de los Alazores mountain pass in the west and the Sierra de Tejeda in the east with the corridor of Periana between them. The Guadalhorce river has its sources in this range. The Sierra de Alhama also includes the Boquete de Zafarraya an important pass at 992 m in the mountainous region of Axarquía.

== See also ==
- Baetic System
- Geology of the Iberian Peninsula
