= 2015 World Youth Championships in Athletics – Girls' 1500 metres =

Girls' 1500 metres at the 2015 World Youth Championships in Athletics
- Venue: Estadio Olímpico Pascual Guerrero
- Dates: 16 and 18 July
- Competitors: 22 from 17 nations
- Winning time: 4:12.92

Medalists
gold medal	Bedatu Hirpa	Ethiopia
silver medal	Dalila Abdulkadir	Bahrain
bronze medal	Joyline Cherotich	Kenya

The girls' 1500 metres at the 2015 World Youth Championships in Athletics was held at the Estadio Olímpico Pascual Guerrero in Cali, Colombia on 16 and 18 July 2015.

== Records ==
Prior to the competition, the following records were as follows.

World Youth Best	Zhang Ling (CHN)	3:54.52	Shanghai, China	18 October 1997
Championship Record	Faith Kipyegon (KEN)	4:09.48	Lille, France	9 July 2011
World Youth Leading	Janeth Chepngetich (KEN)	4:13.8	Nairobi, Kenya	1 April 2015

== Results ==
=== Round 1 ===
First 4 in each heat (Q) and the next 4 fastest (q) advance to the final.

Rank	Heat	Name	Nationality	Time	Note
1	2	Dalila Abdulkadir	Bahrain	4:18.61	Q, SB
2	2	Bedatu Hirpa	Ethiopia	4:19.34	Q, PB
3	2	Joyline Cherotich	Kenya	4:19.96	Q, PB
4	2	Chika Mukai	Japan	4:20.59	Q, PB
5	2	Olivia Burdon	New Zealand	4:21.36	q, PB
6	2	Julia Heymach	United States	4:21.91	q, PB
7	2	Beatha Nishimwe	Rwanda	4:21.91	q
8	2	Harriet Knowles-Jones	Great Britain	4:25.19	q
9	1	Adanech Anbesa	Ethiopia	4:28.70	Q
10	1	Janeth Chepngetich	Kenya	4:32.03	Q
11	1	Wakana Kabasawa	Japan	4:32.13	Q
12	1	Sabrina Sinha	Great Britain	4:32.14	Q
13	1	Semra Karaslan	Turkey	4:32.15	
14	1	Kateryna Siryak	Ukraine	4:34.53	
15	2	Madeleine Sumner	Canada	4:35.91	
16	1	Emily Cohen	Canada	4:36.42	
17	1	Gabriela Doroftei	Romania	4:38.42	
18	2	Hala Hamdi	Tunisia	4:43.87	
19	1	Marisofía Pinilla	Colombia	4:58.23	
20	2	Esperança Elavoco	Angola	5:13.90	PB
–	1	Nadia Power	Ireland	DNF	
–	1	Lucía Rodríguez	Spain	DNS	

=== Final ===
Rank	Name	Nationality	Time	Note
1st place, gold medalist(s)	Bedatu Hirpa	Ethiopia	4:12.92	WYL
2nd place, silver medalist(s)	Dalila Abdulkadir	Bahrain	4:13.35	PB
3rd place, bronze medalist(s)	Joyline Cherotich	Kenya	4:15.20	PB
4	Harriet Knowles-Jones	Great Britain	4:18.61	PB
5	Janeth Chepngetich	Kenya	4:19.43	
6	Chika Mukai	Japan	4:21.59	
7	Adanech Anbesa	Ethiopia	4:21.63	
8	Julia Heymach	United States	4:21.78	PB
9	Olivia Burdon	New Zealand	4:23.04	
10	Beatha Nishimwe	Rwanda	4:23.16	
11	Sabrina Sinha	Great Britain	4:29.85	
12	Wakana Kabasawa	Japan	4:32.50	
