= Marta García (runner) =

Spanish middle- and long-distance runner (born 1998)

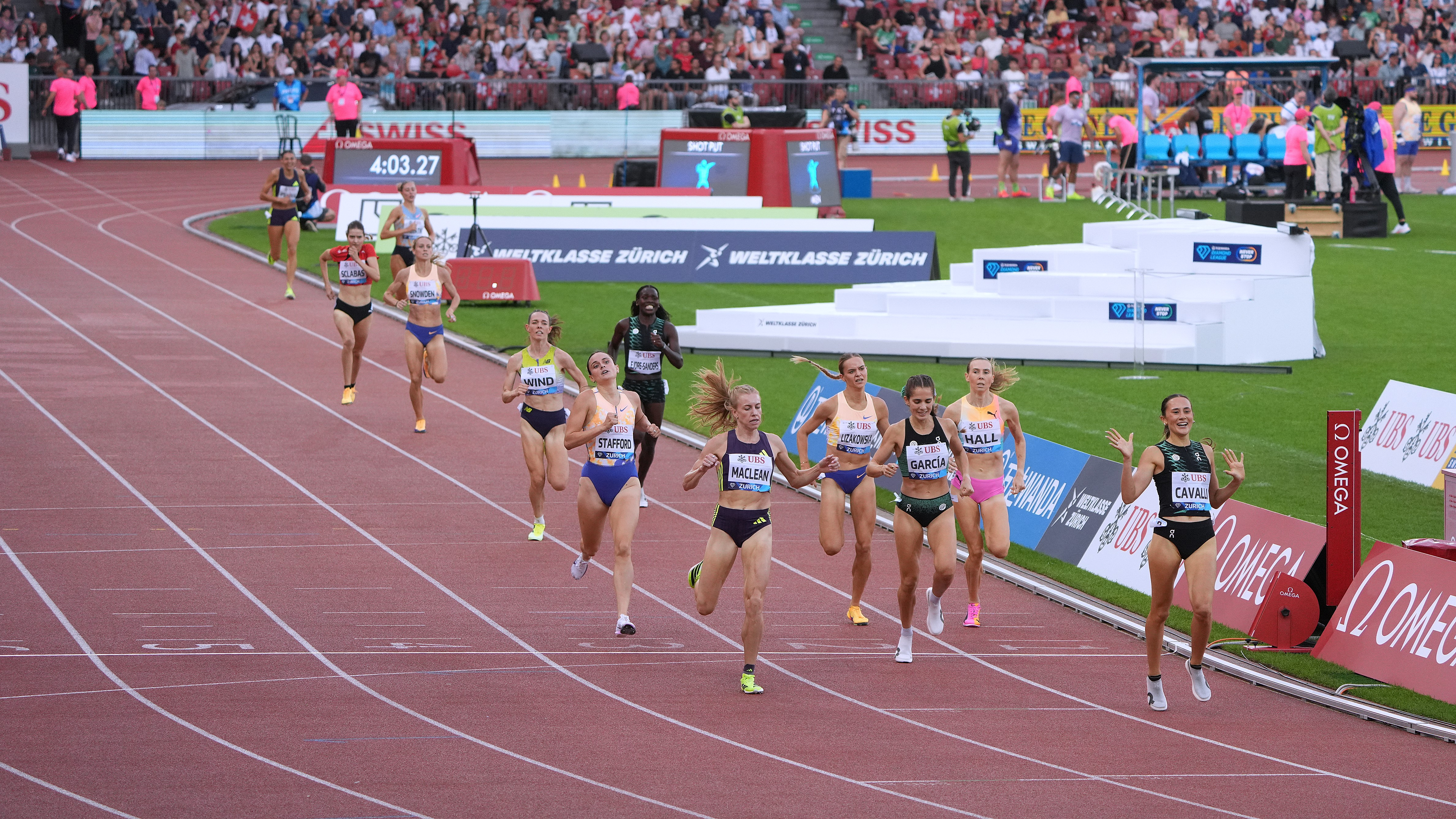
- At the 2026 Weltklasse Zürich

Personal information
- Full name: Marta García Alonso
- Nationality: Spain
- Born: 1 January 1998 (age 28) León, Spain
- Home town: Province of León
- Height: 1.65 m (5 ft 5 in)

Sport
- Sport: Athletics
- Events: 3000 metres 5000 metres
- Club: Barcelona FC; On Athletics Club Europe
- Coached by: Uriel Reguero

Achievements and titles
- Personal bests: 1500 m: 3:59.40 (2025); 3000 m: 8:29.32 (2024); 5000 m: 14:33.40 NR (2025); Indoor; 3000 m: 8:34.28 NR (2026)
Medal record
Women's athletics
Representing Spain
European Championships
Silver medal – second place	2026 Birmingham	5000 m
Bronze medal – third place	2024 Rome	5000 m

Marta García Alonso (Note: In this Spanish name, the first or paternal surname is García and the second or maternal family name is Alonso.) (born 1 January 1998) is a Spanish middle- and long-distance runner competing for the On Athletics Club Europe. She won the bronze medal in the 1500 m at the 2019 Mediterranean Athletics U23 Indoor Championships, and she was the 2021 Spanish Indoor Athletics Championships and 2023 Spanish outdoor championships winner in the 3000 metres and 5000 metres respectively.

== Career ==
García is from the Province of León, where she started running from the age of three. She initially competed for the athletics division of the FC Barcelona club. By 2019, she had moved to Palencia to be coached by Uriel Reguero in Valladolid.

García's first international race was at the 2017 IAAF World Cross Country Championships – Junior women's race, where she was the 3rd scorer for Spain in 54th place, contributing to a 14th-place team finish. Following that at the 2017 European Cross Country Championships, García finished 13th overall in the U20 race and the first Spaniard ahead of teammates Lucía Rodríguez and Carla Gallardo, earning her team a bronze medal.

That bronze medal result was improved upon at the 2018 European Cross Country Championships, this time in the U23 race, when García was the 3rd scorer and 12th overall on the Spanish team earning a silver medal. It was the first ever medal by Spain in the U23 category at the European Cross Country Championships.

At the 2019 Mediterranean Athletics U23 Indoor Championships, García won a bronze medal in the women's 1500 m. She nearly won the silver, but was out-kicked by Alexa Lemitre of France. The medal contributed to Spain's second-place showing overall at the event, behind only the host France. García also competed at the 2019 European U23 Championships in the women's 1500 m, but she did not qualify for the finals.

At the 2021 Spanish Indoor Athletics Championships, García won the 3000 m, her first senior national title. This earned her qualification to the 2021 European Athletics Indoor Championships, where García competed in the 3000 m and barely missed out on the finals. After what she thought was a good start tactically, García said she brushed with another runner with 400 m to go which hampered her final push. That race gave her confidence to try for the Olympic standards in the 1500 m and 5000 m, which she had previously said were out of reach. García ultimately was not selected for the Spanish Olympic team.

In 2021, García signed with the On Athletics Club, joining Carmela Cardama Báez as the other Spanish women's athlete on the team.

García was entered in the 1500 m and 3000 m at the 2022 Mediterranean Games, but she did not start either event. At the 2022 European Championships 5000 m, García finished 12th in a 15:23.36 personal best. At the 2022 European Cross Country Championships, competing for the first time in the senior division, García finished 41st overall and did not score for the Spanish team, which placed 4th in the team standings.

During the 2023 indoor season, García competed at the European Indoor Championships 3000 m, qualifying for the final and finishing 10th. Outdoors, García set her goal on achieving the Budapest World Athletics Championships standards in the 1500 m and 5000 m. Though she was not ultimately able to achieve them, she came closest at the 2023 Golden Gala, where she was a part of Faith Kipyegon's world record-breaking 1500 m race and finished 14th in a personal best of 4:07.22. At the 2023 European Cross Country Championships, García was a member of the Spanish silver medal-winning team, but she was only the 5th Spaniard to finish and did not score for the team.

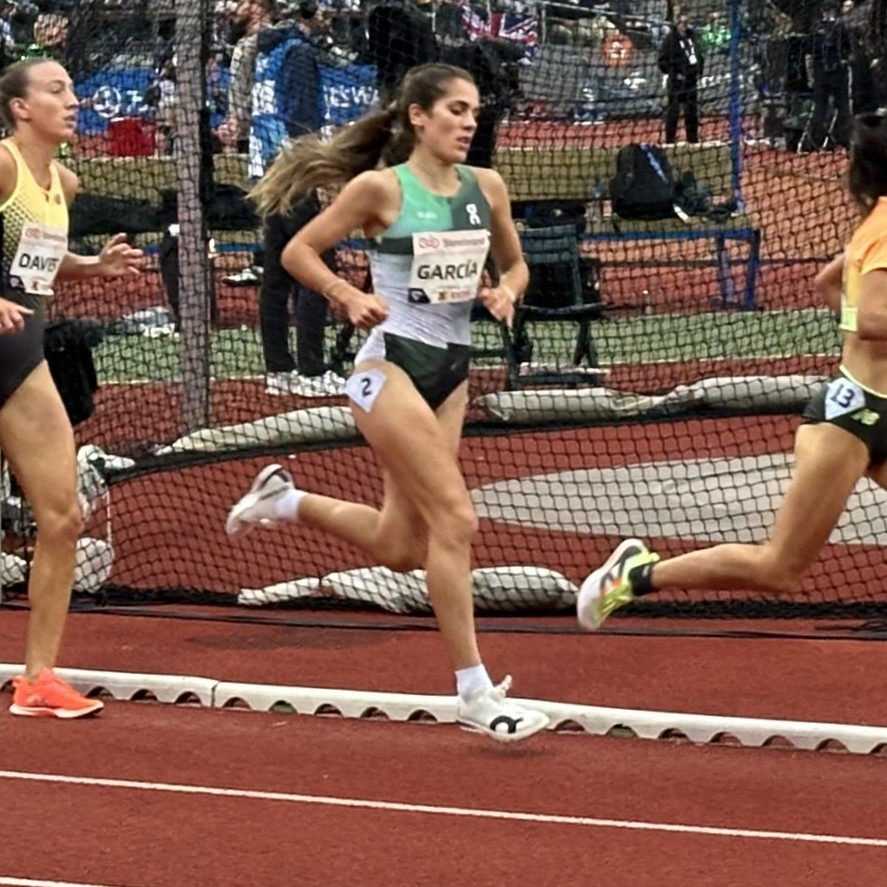
Marta García competing in the 3000 metres event at the 2024 Bislett Games

She obtained a bronze medal in the 5000 m at the 2024 European Athletics Championships with a new personal best of 14:44.04, besting the 29-year old national record of Julia Vaquero in the process.

== Statistics ==
=== International competitions ===
Representing Spain
Year	Competition	Venue	Position	Event	Time
2017	European U20 Championships	Grosseto, Italy	7th	3000 m	9:37.83
2017	European U20 Championships	Grosseto, Italy	5th	5000 m	17:13.43
2018	Mediterranean U23 Championships	Jesolo, Italy	2nd	5000 m	6:31.39
2019	Mediterranean U23 Indoor Championships	Miramas, France	3rd	1500 m i	4:23.81
2019	European U23 Championships	Gävle, Sweden	17th (h)	1500 m	4:33.43
2021	European Indoor Championships	Toruń, Poland	14th (h)	3000 m i	9:02.00
2021	European Cross Country Championships	Dublin, Ireland	5th	Mixed 4 × 1.5 km XC	18:13
2022	European Championships	Munich, Germany	12th	5000 m	15:23.36
2022	European Cross Country Championships	Venaria Reale, Italy	41st	7662 m XC	29:05
2023	European Indoor Championships	Istanbul, Turkey	10th	3000 m i	8:54.92
2023	European Cross Country Championships	Brussels, Belgium	36th	8000 m XC	37:08
2024	World Indoor Championships	Glasgow, United Kingdom	10th	3000 m i	8:40.34
2024	European Championships	Rome, Italy	3rd	5000 m	14:44.04
2024	Olympic Games	Paris, France	21st (h)	5000 m	15:08.87
2025	European Indoor Championships	Apeldoorn, Netherlands	4th	3000 m i	8:53.67
2025	World Indoor Championships	Nanjing, China	7th	3000 m i	8:40.80
2025	World Championships	Tokyo, Japan	7th	5000 m	15:01.02
2026	World Indoor Championships	Toruń, Poland	–	3000 m i	DQ
2026	European Championships	Birmingham, United Kingdom	2nd	5000 m	15:39.98
2026	Mediterranean Games	Taranto, Italy	4th	1500 m	4:10.87
2026	World Ultimate Championship	Budapest, Hungary	10th	5000 m	14:43.94

=== Personal bests ===
Event	Mark	Place	Competition	Venue	Date	Ref
1500 metres	4:05.61	7th	Hanžeković Memorial	Zagreb, Croatia	10 September 2023	
3000 metres	8:29.32	6th	Bislett Games	Oslo, Norway	30 May 2024	
3000 meters (short track)	8:38.34 sh	8th	The TRACK at New Balance	Boston, USA	4 Feb 2024	
5000 metres	14:44.04	3rd	European Championships	Rome, Italy	7 June 2024	
5000 meters (short track)	14:46.37 sh	4th	Boston University	Boston, USA	27 Jan 2024	

=== National titles ===
- Spanish Athletics Championships
  - 5000 metres: 2022, 2023
