= 2021 Spanish Indoor Athletics Championships =

- Dates: 19–21 February
- Host city: Madrid
- Venue: Polideportivo Gallur
- Events: 26

The 2021 Spanish Indoor Athletics Championships was the 57th edition of the annual indoor track and field competition organised by the Royal Spanish Athletics Federation (RFEA), which serves as the Spanish national indoor championship for the sport. A total of 26 events (divided evenly between the sexes) were contested over three days on 19 and 21 February at the Polideportivo Gallur in Madrid.

== Results ==
=== Men ===
Event	Gold		Silver		Bronze	
60 metres	Daniel Rodríguez; Playas de Castellón	6.67 PB	Arian Olmos Téllez; Playas de Castellón	6.73	Mario López; At. Numantino; Sergio López; Nutriban At. Alcantarilla	6.74
200 metres	Daniel Rodríguez; Playas de Castellón	20.83 PB	Manuel Guijarro; F.C. Barcelona)	21.08 PB	Oriol Madí; S.G. Pontevedra	21.23
400 metres	Óscar Husillos; C.A. Adidas	46.55	Samuel García; Tenerife Caja Canarias	46.97	Lucas Búa; F.C. Barcelona	47.13
800 metres	Álvaro de Arriba; C.D. Nike Running	1:47.91	Pablo Sánchez-Valladares; F.C. Barcelona	1:48.36	Mariano García; Playas de Castellón	1:48.51
1500 metres	Jesús Gómez; C.D. Nike Running	3:49.32	Abderrahman El Khayami; Playas de Castellón	3:50.21	Llorenç Sales; U.A. Montsià	3:50.43
3000 metres	Adel Mechaal; New Balance Team	8:20.17	Mohamed Katir; Playas de Castellón	8:22.14	Gonzalo García; Cueva de Nerja	8:22.96
60 m hurdles	Asier Martínez; Grupompleo Pamplona	7.63 PB	Enrique Llopis; C.A. Gandía	7.71 PB	Daniel Cisneros; At. Numantino	7.88 PB
High jump	David Bolado; At. Numantino	2.15 m	Angel Torrero; A.A. Catalunya	2.12 m	Juan Ignacio López; Fent Camí Mislata	2.12 m
Pole vault	Isidro Leyva; Nerja Atletismo	5.55 m PB	Alex Gracia; F.C. Barcelona	5.42 m PB	Adrián Vallés; Grupompleo Pamplona	5.37 m
Long jump	Eusebio Cáceres; Independent	7.91 m	Francisco Javier Cobián; Universidad Oviedo	7.70 m	Jean Marie Okutu; F.C. Barcelona	7.68 m
Triple jump	Sergio Solanas; A.D. Marathon	16.19 m	Eneko Carrascal; Real Sociedad	16.14 m PB	José Emilio Bellido; Playas de Castellón	16.12 m
Shot put	Carlos Tobalina; F.C. Barcelona	19.67 m	Borja Vivas; At. Málaga	18.81 m	José Ángel Pinedo; Fent Camí Mislata	18.71 m PB
Heptathlon	Mario Arancón; At. Numantino	5508 pts	Pablo Martínez de Guereñu; Durango Kirol Taldea	5462 pts	Jesús Castillo; Cornellá At.	5432 pts

=== Women ===
Event	Gold		Silver		Bronze	
60 metres	Paula Sevilla; Playas de Castellón	7.29 CR PB	María Isabel Pérez; Valencia C.A.	7.33	María Cisneros; Universidad León	7.41 PB
200 metres	Nerea Bermejo; Grupompleo Pamplona	23.54 PB	Estela García; Independent	23.87	Anna Obradors; L'Hospitalet At.	23.93 PB
400 metres	Aauri Lorena Bokesa; F.C. Barcelona	52.74 PB	Andrea Jiménez; Playas de Castellón	53.66	Salma Paralluelo; Playas de Castellón	53.92
800 metres	Lorea Ibarzábal; At. San Sebastián	2:05.81 PB	Daniela García; Playas de Castellón	2:06.00	Natalia Romero; Unicaja Jaén	2:06.52
1500 metres	Esther Guerrero; New Balance Team	4:07.48 CR	Marta Pérez; C.A. Adidas	4:09.44	Águeda Muñoz; F.C. Barcelona	4:14.18 PB
3000 metres	Marta García; F.C. Barcelona	9:14.76	Blanca Fernández; F.C. Barcelona	9:15.31	Lucía Rodríguez; C.D. Nike Running	9:16.10
60 m hurdles	Xenia Benach; Alcampo Scorpio 71	8.20	Caridad Jerez; F.C. Barcelona	8.20	Carmen Sánchez; At. Arroyomolinos	8.25 PB
High jump	Izaskun Turrillas; Grupompleo Pamplona	1.81 m	Una Stancev; Cueva de Nerja	1.74 m	Raquel Álvarez; Las Celtíberas	1.74 m
Pole vault	Malen Ruiz de Azúa; Valencia C.A.	4.43 m	Miren Bartolomé; Grupompleo Pamplona	4.38 m	Andrea San José; F.C. Barcelona	4.28 m
Long jump	Fátima Diame; Valencia C.A.	6.51 m	Tessy Ebosele; Real Sociedad	6.31 m PB	María Vicente; C.D. Nike Running	6.24 m
Triple jump	Ana Peleteiro; C.A. Adidas	14.21 m	Patricia Sarrapio; Playas de Castellón	13.77 m	Tessy Ebosele; Real Sociedad	13.54 m PB
Shot put	María Belén Toimil; Playas de Castellón	17.81 m	Úrsula Ruiz; Valencia C.A.	16.24 m	Mónica Borraz; F.C. Barcelona	14.92 m
Pentathlon	María Vicente; C.D. Nike Running	4501 pts NR CR	Claudia Conte; Playas de Castellón	4361 pts PB	Carmen Ramos; Playas de Castellón	4060 pts
