= Bruney =

Bruney is a surname. Notable people with this surname include:

- Brian Bruney (born 1982), American baseball pitcher
- Fred Bruney (1931–2016), American football player and coach
- Maya Bruney (born 1998), British and Italian sprinter
- Zac Bruney (born c. 1983), American football coach
