= 2016 IAAF World U20 Championships – Women's 1500 metres =

The women's 1500 metres event at the 2016 IAAF World U20 Championships was held at Zdzisław Krzyszkowiak Stadium on 22 and 24 July.

== Medalists ==
Gold	Adanech Anbesa; Ethiopia
Silver	Fantu Worku; Ethiopia
Bronze	Anthony Kiptoo; Kenya

== Records ==
Standing records prior to the 2016 IAAF World U20 Championships in Athletics
World Junior Record	Lang Yinglai (CHN)	3:51.34	Shanghai, China	18 October 1997
Championship Record	Faith Chepngetich Kipyegon (KEN)	4:04.96	Barcelona, Spain	15 July 2012
World Junior Leading	Gudaf Tsegay (ETH)	4:00.18	Eugene, United States	28 May 2016

== Results ==
=== Heats ===
Qualification: First 4 of each heat (Q) and the 4 fastest times (q) qualified for the final.

Rank	Heat	Name	Nationality	Time	Note
1	2	Winfred Nzisa Mbithe	Kenya	4:12.39	Q
2	2	Alexa Efraimson	United States	4:13.12	Q
3	2	Fantu Worku	Ethiopia	4:13.84	Q
4	1	Adanech Anbesa	Ethiopia	4:15.53	Q
5	2	Bobby Clay	Great Britain	4:15.79	Q
6	1	Joyline Cherotich	Kenya	4:16.41	Q, SB
7	1	Beatha Nishimwe	Rwanda	4:17.85	Q
8	1	Christina Aragon	United States	4:18.93	Q
9	2	Lili Das	India	4:19.48	q, PB
10	2	Olivia Burdon	New Zealand	4:21.49	q
11	1	Fatma Arık	Turkey	4:21.81	q, PB
12	1	Harriet Knowles-Jones	Great Britain	4:21.91	q
13	1	Lucia Stafford	Canada	4:22.38	
14	1	Salomé Afonso	Portugal	4:22.68	PB
15	2	Nicole Hutchinson	Canada	4:22.88	PB
16	2	Chiara Ferdani	Italy	4:23.07	PB
17	2	Lucía Rodríguez	Spain	4:24.04	
18	1	Saija Seppä	Finland	4:24.36	
19	2	Dilyana Minkina	Bulgaria	4:25.12	
20	2	Amy Harding-Delooze	Australia	4:25.38	
21	2	Alondra Negrón	Puerto Rico	4:26.02	
22	1	Lauren Ryan	Australia	4:26.60	
23	1	Hala Hamdi	Tunisia	4:28.04	SB
24	1	Harmilan Kaur Bains	India	4:28.19	
25	1	Aliaksandra Sakalouskaya	Belarus	4:28.52	
26	2	Damla Çelik	Turkey	4:28.64	
27	1	Lara Alemanni	Switzerland	4:31.42	
28	2	Dawajila	China	4:43.38	SB
	1	Konstanze Klosterhalfen	Germany	DNS	

=== Final ===
Rank	Name	Nationality	Time	Note
1st place, gold medalist(s)	Adanech Anbesa	Ethiopia	4:08.07	
2nd place, silver medalist(s)	Fantu Worku	Ethiopia	4:08.43	
3rd place, bronze medalist(s)	Christina Aragon	United States	4:08.71	PB
4	Winfred Nzisa Mbithe	Kenya	4:09.25	PB
5	Alexa Efraimson	United States	4:10.23	
6	Beatha Nishimwe	Rwanda	4:12.33	
7	Bobby Clay	Great Britain	4:13.09	
8	Harriet Knowles-Jones	Great Britain	4:15.49	PB
9	Joyline Cherotich	Kenya	4:15.72	SB
10	Lili Das	India	4:17.29	PB
11	Fatma Arık	Turkey	4:20.90	PB
12	Olivia Burdon	New Zealand	4:25.94	
