= Elise Vanderelst =

Belgian middle-distance runner

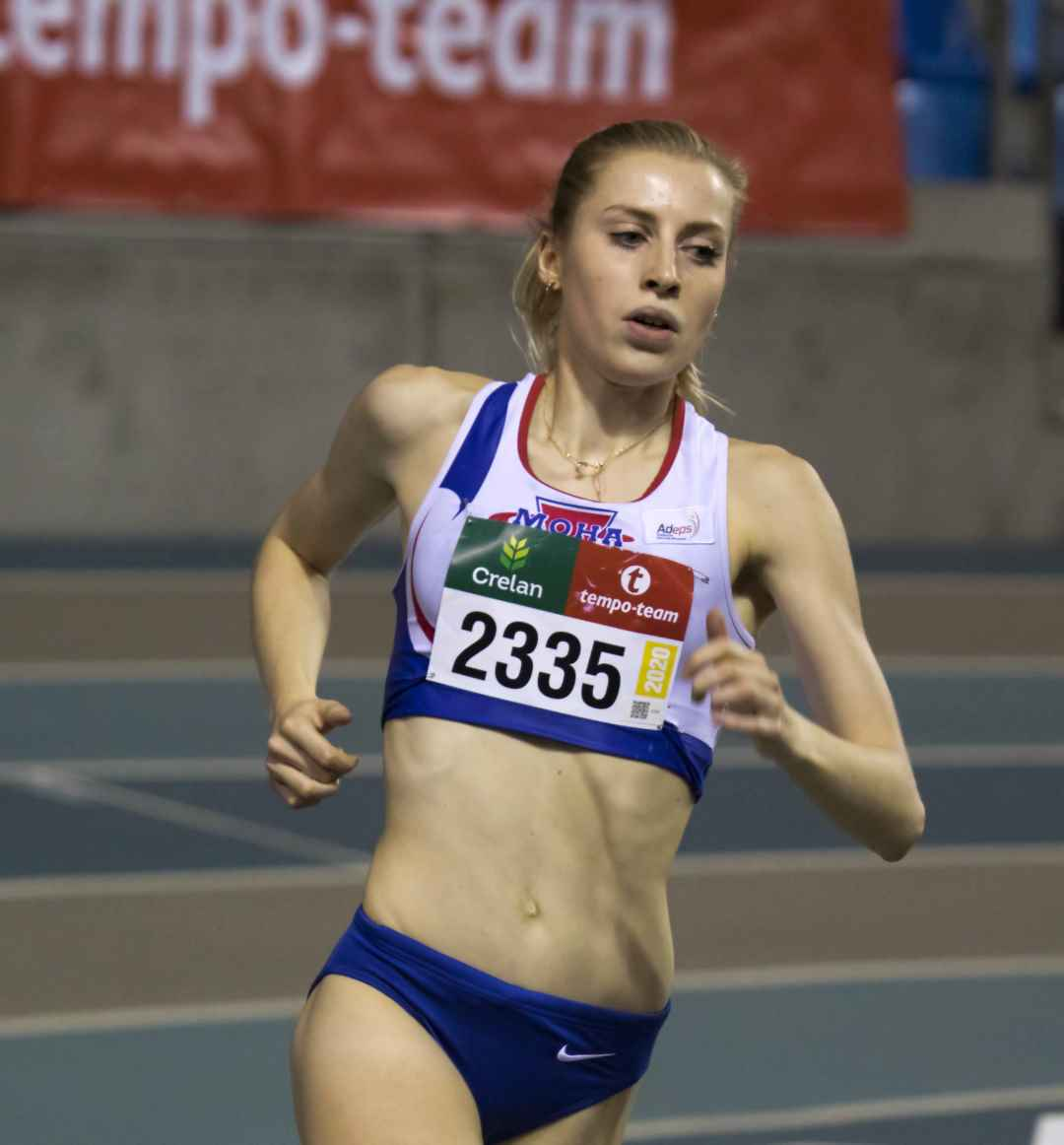
- Vanderelst in 2020

Personal information
- Born: 27 January 1998 (age 28) Mons, Belgium

Sport
- Sport: Women's athletics
- Event: 1500 metres
- Coached by: Raymond Castiaux

Achievements and titles
- Personal bests: 1500 m: 4:01.26 NR (Brussels, 2024); 5000 m: 14:40.70 (Brussels, 2025)
Medal record
Women's athletics
Representing Belgium
European Indoor Championships
Gold medal – first place	2021 Toruń	1500 m
European Cross Country Championships
Bronze medal – third place	2021 Dublin	Mixed relay
European U23 Championships
Silver medal – second place	2019 Gävle	1500 m

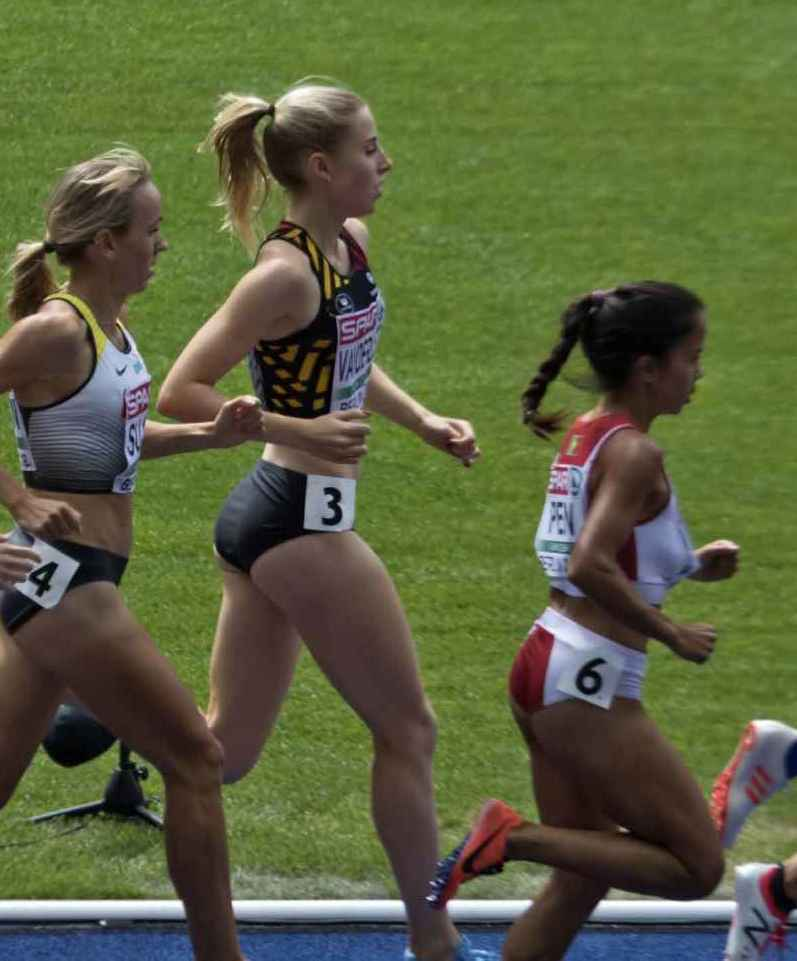
Vanderelst (center) at the 2018 European Championships

Elise Vanderelst (born 27 January 1998) is a Belgian middle-distance runner. She won the gold medal for the 1500 metres at the 2021 European Indoor Championships and a bronze medal at the 2021 European Cross Country Championships in the Mixed relay with her teammates Vanessa Scaunet, Ruben Verheyden and Stijn Baeten.

Vanderelst has represented Belgium at the 2020 and 2024 Olympics in the 1500 m event.

She holds 5 Belgian national records in the 1000 metres, indoor & outdoor 1500m and indoor and outdoor Mile.

Vanderelst won 9 national titles indoor & outdoor 1500m indoor 800m and cross country.

== Achievements ==
=== International competitions ===
Representing Belgium
Year	Competition	Venue	Position	Event	Time	Notes
2015	World Youth Championships	Cali, Colombia	(sf)	800 m	2:17.03	(Note: Vanderelst clocked 2:10.20 sec in the heats)
2016	World U20 Championships	Bydgoszcz, Poland	4th	800 m	2:05.82	(Note: Vanderelst timed 2:05.32 in the semi-finals)
2017	European U20 Championships	Grosseto, Italy	7th	800 m	2:10.50	
2018	European Championships	Berlin, Germany	13th (h)	1500 m	4:10.30	(Note: Vanderelst was short of just 0.16 sec to qualify to the final)
2019	European U23 Championships	Gävle, Sweden	2nd	1500 m	4:23.50	
2021	European Indoor Championships	Toruń, Poland	1st	1500 m	4:18.44 i	
2021	Olympic Games	Tokyo, Japan	20th (sf)	1500 m	4:04.86	
2021	European Cross Country Championships	Dublin, Ireland	3rd	Mixed relay	18:06	
2022	World Championships	Eugene, United States	35th (h)	1500 m	4:10.45	
2022	European Championships	Munich, Germany	17th (h)	1500 m	4:07.62	
2023	World Championships	Budapest, Hungary	50th (h)	1500 m	4:11.55	
2024	World Indoor Championships	Glasgow, United Kingdom	8th (h)	1500 m	4:10.15	
2024	European Championships	Rome, Italy	9th (h)	1500 m	4:11.03	
2024	Olympic Games	Paris, France	16th (rep)	1500 m	4:08.86	
2025	European Indoor Championships	Apeldoorn, Netherlands	15th (h)	1500 m	4:16.68	
2025	World Championships	Tokyo, Japan	19th (h)	5000 m	15:00.52	
2026	European Championships	Birmingham, United Kingdom	21st	5000 m	16:08.62	

=== Personal bests ===
Event	Time (sec)	Venue	Date	Notes
800 metres	2:01.68	Heusden-Zolder, Belgium	2 July 2022	
800 metres indoor	2:02.50	Ottignies-Louvain-la-Neuve, Belgium	20 February 2021	
1000 metres	2:35.98	Heusden-Zolder, Belgium	3 July 2021	NR
1000 metres indoor	2:46.21 i	Ghent, Belgium	25 February 2017	NU20R
1500 metres	4:01.26	Brussels, Belgium	14 September 2024	NR
1500 metres indoor	4:05.71 i	Liévin, France	9 February 2021	NR
Mile Outdoor	4:26:09 i	Heusden-Zolder, Belgium	2022	NR
Mile Indoor	4:29.31 i	Ostrava	2024	NR
