= Amy-Eloise Neale =

English long-distance runner (b. 1995)

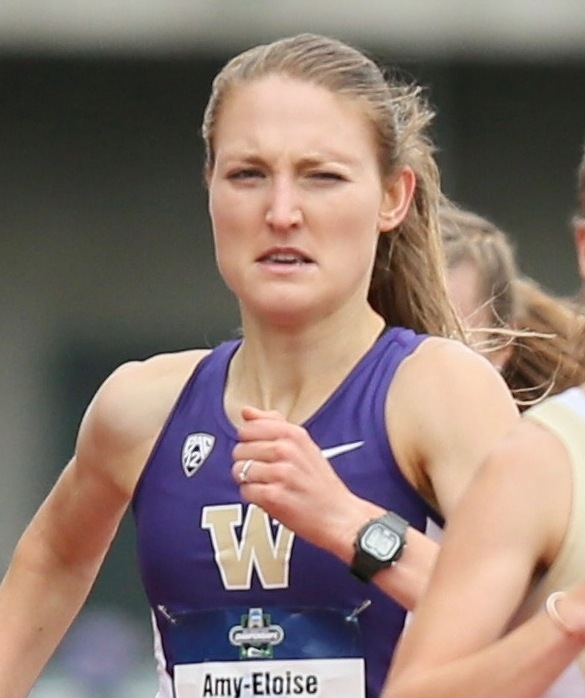
- Amy-Eloise Neale at the 2017 NCAA Division I Outdoor Track and Field Championships

Personal information
- Born: Amy-Eloise Neale; 5 August 1995 (age 30) Stockport, England
- Home town: Loughborough, England
- Height: 1.78 m (5 ft 10 in)

Sport
- Country: Great Britain & N.I. England
- Sport: Athletics
- Event(s): Middle-, Long-distance running
- College team: University of Washington Huskies
- Turned pro: 2018
- Coached by: Rob Denmark

Achievements and titles
- Personal bests: 3000 m: 8:40.32 (Rabat 2022); Two miles: 9:21.98 NB (Eugene 2021); 5000 m: 14:56.60 (Birmingham 2022); 10,000 m: 31:17.81 (London 2023); Indoors; 3000 m: 8:44.15 (New York 2022); Two miles: 9:30.69 NB (New York 2021); 5000 m: 15:32.72 (Boston 2020); Road; 5 km: 15:29 (Zürich 2022); 10 km: 32:35 (Manchester 2021); Half marathon: 1:11:12 (Newcastle 2022)
Medal record
Women's athletics
Representing Great Britain
European Indoor Championships
Gold medal – first place	2021 Toruń	3000 m
World Cross Country Championships
Bronze medal – third place	2013 Bydgoszcz	U20 Team
European Cross Country Championships
Gold medal – first place	2017 Šamorín	U23 Team

Amy-Eloise Neale OLY (formerly Markovc; born 5 August 1995) is a British middle- and long-distance runner. She won the gold medal in the 3000 metres at the 2021 European Indoor Championships.

Neale is a two-time British national champion.

In 2024, Neale chose to go by her birth name of Amy-Eloise Neale instead of Amy-Eloise Markovc.

== Career ==
Born in Stockport, England, she later moved to the United States and took up track and field. At the age of 14 she won the 2000 metres steeplechase at the 2010 USATF National Junior Olympic Track & Field Championships. While studying at Glacier Peak High School, Neale was the Washington state Gatorade Girls Track & Field Athlete of the Year for three years running (2011, 2012, 2013). Neale had top eight finishes each year at the Nike Cross Nationals from 2010 to 2012, with her highest finish being 3rd in 2010.

Her international debut for Great Britain followed at the 2011 World Youth Championships in Athletics, where she placed eleventh in the steeplechase final. Neale competed in her first major cross country running event at the 2013 World Cross Country Championships, placing 21st in the junior race. She was also a steeplechase finalist at the 2013 European Junior Championships and 2014 World Junior Championships. After the latter event she did not compete for 18 months.

In 2016, she began to compete again for the Washington Huskies track team for her alma mater, the University of Washington. She took eighth place at the NCAA Division I Cross Country Championships.

The following year, Neale made the final in the mile at the NCAA Division I Indoor Championships. In the outdoor track season, she made the 1500 metres final at the NCAA Division I Championships. It was in cross country that she began to make an impact in 2017, becoming the runner-up at the NCAA Division I Cross Country Championships. Neale then placed fourth in the under-23 race at the European Cross Country Championships, earning U23 women's team title.

Her focus returned to the track in 2018, with highlights including twelfth in the 3000 metres at the NCAA Division I Indoor Championships and fifth in the 5000 metres at the NCAA Division I Championships. Later that year, she signed with the Reebok Boston Track Club under coach Chris Fox.

In 2019, Neale secured her first national podium at the British Indoor Athletics Championships with third in the 3000 m.

In February 2021, she broke the British two mile record at New Balance Indoor Grand Prix in New York, completing the distance in 9:30.69. In March that year, Neale won the gold medal in the 3000 m at the European Indoor Championships in Toruń, Poland in a personal best time of 8:46.43.

In 2022, she claimed her first national title with a 3000 m victory at the British Indoor Championships and outdoors added second title for the 5000 m. Neale set new personal bests in the 3000 m, 5000 m, 10,000 m, 5 km road race and half marathon that year.

== Statistics ==
=== International competitions ===
Representing Great Britain / England
Year	Competition	Venue	Position	Event	Result
2011	World Youth Championships	Lille, France	11th	2000 m s'chase	6:37.27
2013	World Cross Country Championships	Bydgoszcz, Poland	21st	Junior race	19:34
2013	World Cross Country Championships	Bydgoszcz, Poland	3rd	Junior team	81 pts
2013	European Junior Championships	Rieti, Italy	5th	3000 m s'chase	10:19.32
2014	World Junior Championships	Eugene, OR, United States	11th	3000 m s'chase	10:25.14
2017	European Cross Country Championships	Šamorín, Slovakia	4th	U23 race	20:59
2017	European Cross Country Championships	Šamorín, Slovakia	1st	U23 team	12 pts
2021	European Indoor Championships	Toruń, Poland	1st	3000 m	8:46.43
2021	Olympic Games	Tokyo, Japan	20th (h)	5000 m	15:03.22
2022	World Indoor Championships	Belgrade, Serbia	15th	3000 m	8:53.57
2022	World Championships	Eugene, OR, United States	25th (h)	5000 m	15:31.62
2022	Commonwealth Games	Birmingham, United Kingdom	4th	5000 m	14:56.60
2022	European Championships	Munich, Germany	5th	5000 m	15:08.75
2023	World Championships	Budapest, Hungary	23rd (h)	5000 m	15:13.66
2024	European Championships	Rome, Italy	19th	5000 m	15:33:45

=== National titles ===
- British Athletics Championships
  - 5000 metres: 2022
- British Indoor Athletics Championships
  - 3000 metres: 2022
