= 2016 African Championships in Athletics – Women's 1500 metres =

The women's 1500 metres event at the 2016 African Championships in Athletics was held on 24 June in Kings Park Stadium.

== Results ==
Rank	Athlete	Nationality	Time	Notes
1st place, gold medalist(s)	Caster Semenya	South Africa	4:01.99	CR
2nd place, silver medalist(s)	Rabab Arafi	Morocco	4:03.95	
3rd place, bronze medalist(s)	Adanech Anbesa	Ethiopia	4:05.22	
4	Fantu Worku	Ethiopia	4:05.84	
5	Siham Hilali	Morocco	4:07.39	
6	Janet Achola	Uganda	4:08.11	
7	Beatha Nishimwe	Rwanda	4:08.75	NR
8	Sela Jepleting	Kenya	4:09.14	
9	Judy Kiyeng	Kenya	4:11.60	
10	Alawia Andal	Sudan	4:29.51	
11	Lavinia Haitope	Namibia	4:31.11	
12	Merhawit Ghide	Eritrea	4:48.10	
13	Divine Makaya-Asani	Democratic Republic of the Congo	5:18.59	
	Malika Akkaoui	Morocco	DNS	
