= Angelika Sarna =

Polish middle-distance runner

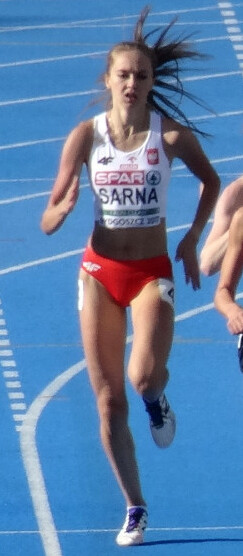
- Angelika Sarna in 2017

Personal information
- Nationality: Polish
- Born: 1 October 1997 (age 28)

Sport
- Sport: Athletics
- Event: 800 metres

Achievements and titles
- Personal best: 800 m: 1:59.08 (Chorzów 2025)

Angelika Sarna (born 1 October 1997) is a Polish athlete. She competed in the women's 800 metres event at the 2020 Summer Olympics.

== International competitions ==
Representing Poland
Year	Competition	Venue	Position	Event	Notes
2015	European Junior Championships	Eskilstuna, Sweden	12th (h)	800 m	2:08.97
2017	European U23 Championships	Bydgoszcz, Poland	17th (h)	800 m	2:08.06
2019	European U23 Championships	Gävle, Sweden	5th	800 m	2:07.46
2021	Olympic Games	Tokyo, Japan	29th (h)	800 m	2:02.18
2022	European Championships	Munich, Germany	14th (sf)	800 m	2:02.15
2023	European Indoor Championships	Istanbul, Turkey	18th (h)	800 m	2:05.50
2023	World Championships	Budapest, Hungary	46th (h)	800 m	2:01.78
2024	World Indoor Championships	Glasgow, United Kingdom	20th (h)	800 m	2:03.36
2024	European Championships	Rome, Italy	8th	800 m	2:01.21
2025	European Indoor Championships	Apeldoorn, Netherlands	5th (sf)	800 m	2:02.54
2025	World Championships	Tokyo, Japan	48th (h)	800 m	2:02.81
