= Jemma Reekie =

British middle-distance runner (born 1998)

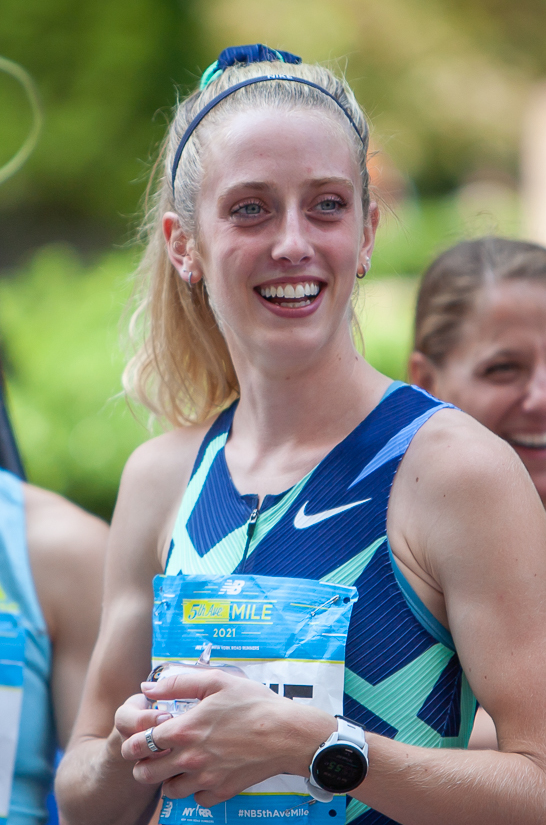
- Reekie at the 2021 Fifth Avenue Mile

Personal information
- Born: 6 March 1998 (age 28) Beith, Ayrshire, Scotland

Sport
- Sport: Athletics
- Event: Middle-distance running
- Club: Kilbarchan AAC
- Coached by: Andy Young (2015–2023); Arthur Smith (–2015)

Achievements and titles
- Olympic finals: 2020 Tokyo; 800 m, 4th
- Personal bests: Outdoors; 800 m: 1:55.61 (London 2024); Mile: 4:19.40 (New York 2023); Indoors; 800 m: 1:57.91i (Glasgow 2020)
Medal record
Women's athletics
Representing Great Britain
World Indoor Championships
Silver medal – second place	2024 Glasgow	800 m
European U23 Championships
Gold medal – first place	2019 Gävle	800 m
Gold medal – first place	2019 Gävle	1500 m
European U20 Championships
Gold medal – first place	2017 Grosseto	1500 m

Jemma Reekie (born 6 March 1998) is a Scottish middle-distance runner who competed at the 2020 and 2024 Summer Olympics.

== Career ==
Reekie was born in Beith in Scotland in March 1998.

Reekie competed at the 2017 European U20 Championships in July, winning the gold medal in the 1500 metres and finishing fourth in the 3000 metres.

At the 2018 European Championships in August, Reekie competed in the 1500 metres, failing to make the final.

Reekie competed at the 2019 European Indoor Championships in March, failing to make the final of the 1500 metres. In July, she achieved a rare double at the 2019 European U23 Championships, winning gold medals in the 800 metres and 1500 metres. In October, she competed at the 2019 World Championships. She failed to make the final of the 1500 metres.

In February 2020, Reekie broke three British indoor records within eight days, setting a new mark for the 800 metres, and then for the mile and 1500 metres. The 1500 metres record was broken by her training partner, Laura Muir, in 2021, and the 800 metres record was broken by Keely Hodgkinson in 2022.

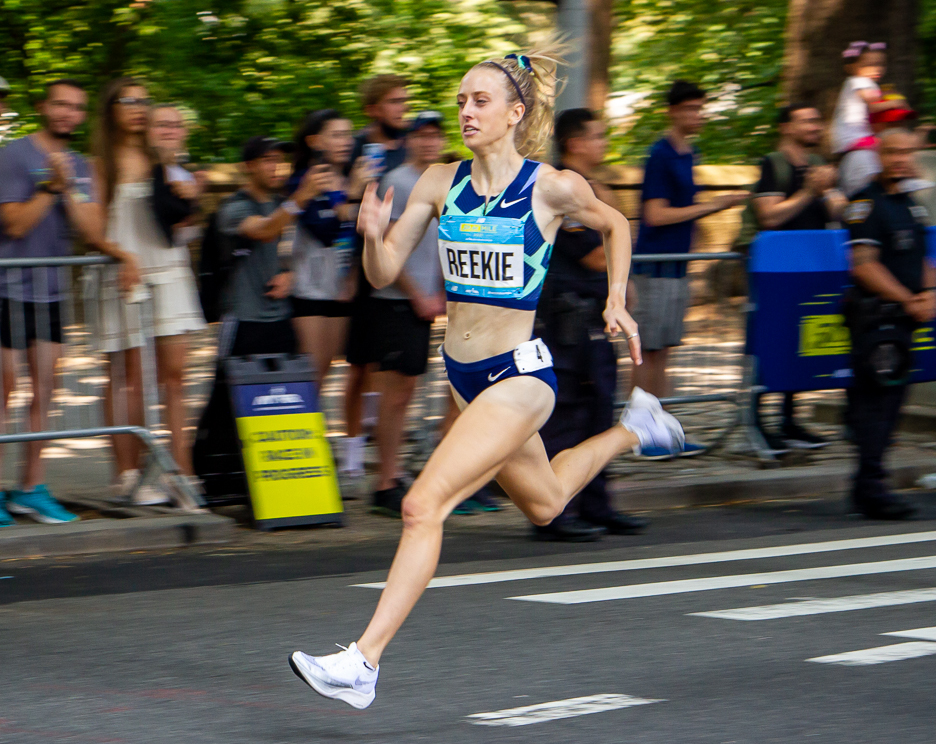
Reekie running in the 2021 Fifth Avenue Mile

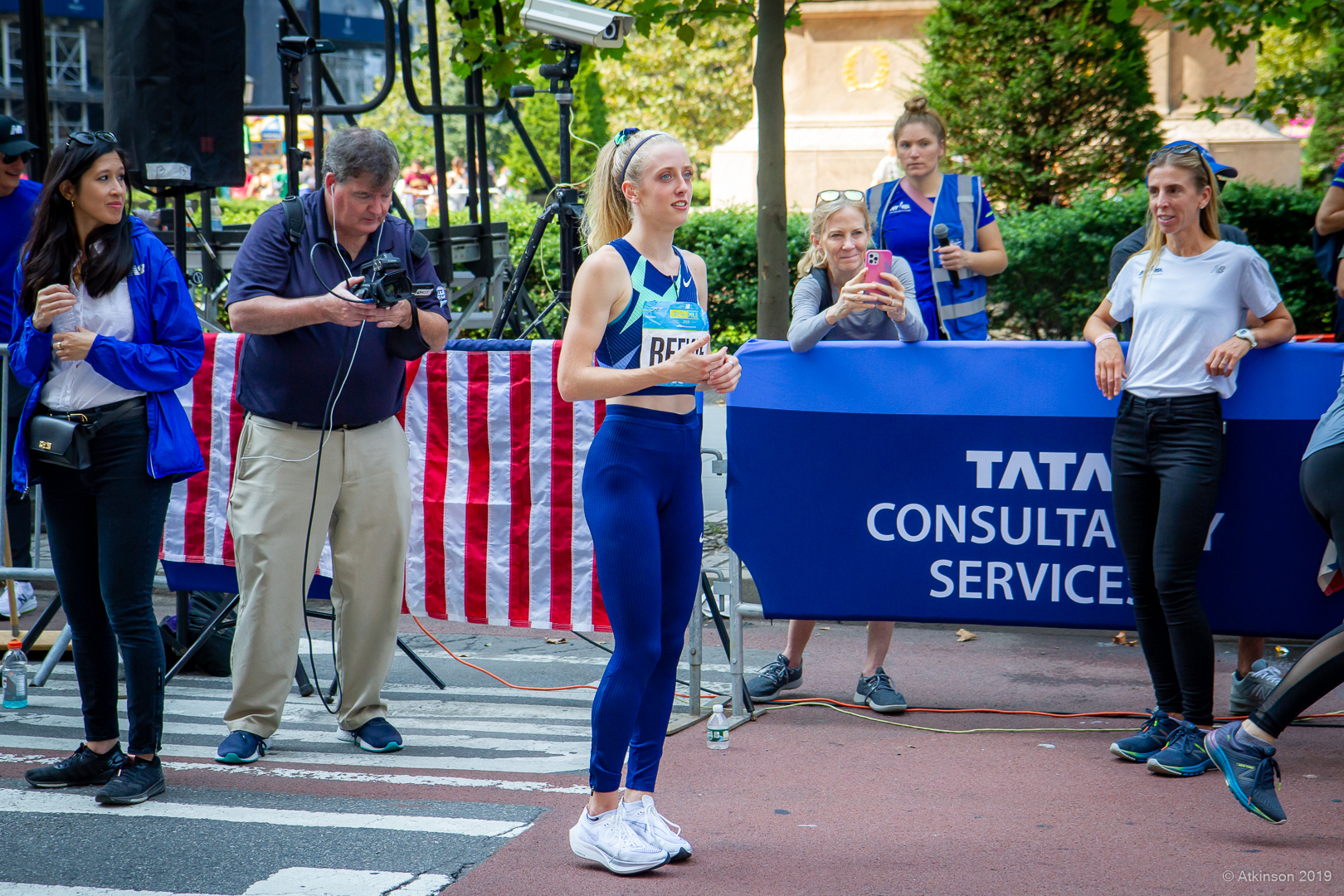
Reekie at the 2021 Fifth Avenue Mile awards ceremony

In July and August 2021, Reekie competed at the 2020 Summer Olympics. She finished fourth in the 800 metres with a personal best time of 1:56.90. In September, she won the 2021 Fifth Avenue Mile.

Reekie became the British 800 metres champion after winning the title at the 2022 British Athletics Championships and then competed at the 2022 World Championships in July, failing to make the final of the 800 metres. In August, she competed at the 2022 Commonwealth Games. In the 800 metres, she failed to make the final. In the 1500 metres, she finished fifth. Later that month, she competed at the 2022 European Championships, where she finished fifth in the 800 metres.

In March 2023, Reekie split from trainer Andy Young, who had coached her since 2015, after quitting a training camp in South Africa. In August, she competed at the 2023 World Championships, finishing fifth in the 800 metres. In September, she won the 2023 Fifth Avenue Mile.

Reekie made a successful start to the 2024 indoor season, winning the UK Indoor Athletics Championships 800m in a championship record time of 1:58.24. After winning the 800 metres silver medal at the 2024 British Athletics Championships, Reekie was subsequently named in the Great Britain team for the 2024 Summer Olympics where she went out in the semi-finals.

== Achievements ==
=== International competitions ===
Representing Great Britain / Scotland
Year	Competition	Venue	Position	Event	Time
2017	European U20 Championships	Grosseto, Italy	1st	1500 m	4:13.25
2017	European U20 Championships	Grosseto, Italy	4th	3000 m	9:24.81 PB
2018	European Championships	Berlin, Germany	15th (h)	1500 m	4:10.35
2019	European Indoor Championships	Birmingham, England	11th (h)	1500 m	4:13.44 PB
2019	European U23 Championships	Gävle, Sweden	1st	800 m	2:05.19
2019	European U23 Championships	Gävle, Sweden	1st	1500 m	4:22.81
2019	World Championships	Doha, Qatar	32nd (h)	1500 m	4:12.51
2021	Olympic Games	Tokyo, Japan	4th	800m	1:56:90 PB
2022	World Championships	Eugene, OR, United States	15th (sf)	800 m	2:00.43
2022	Commonwealth Games	Birmingham, England	11th (h)	800 m	2:00.68
2022	Commonwealth Games	Birmingham, England	5th	1500 m	4:05.33
2022	European Championships	Munich, Germany	5th	800 m	2:00.31
2023	World Championships	Budapest, Hungary	5th	800 m	1:57.72
2024	World Indoor Championships	Glasgow, Scotland	2nd	800 m	2:02.72
2024	European Championships	Rome, Italy	5th	1500 m	4:06.17
2024	Olympic Games	Paris, France	8th (sf)	800 m	1:58.01
2025	World Championships	Tokyo, Japan	15th (h)	800 m	1:59.35
2026	World Indoor Championships	Toruń, Poland	4th (h)	1500 m	4:11.61
2026	Commonwealth Games	Glasgow, United Kingdom	15th (sf)	800 m	2:03.46
2026	Commonwealth Games	Glasgow, United Kingdom	10th	Mile	4:42.93
2026	European Championships	Birmingham, United Kingdom	5th	800 m	1:59.15

=== Personal bests ===
- 800 metres – 1:55.61 (London 2024)
  - 800 metres indoor – 1:57.91 (Glasgow 2020)
- 1500 metres – 3:58.65 (Chorzów 2023)
  - 1500 metres indoor – 4:00.52+ (New York 2020)
- One mile – 4:19.40 (New York 2023)
  - One mile indoor – 4:17.88 (New York 2020) NR

=== Circuit wins and national titles ===
- Diamond League
  - 2020 (2): Stockholm Bauhaus-galan (800 m), Rome Golden Gala (800 m)
  - 2023: London Anniversary Games (800 m)
- World Athletics Indoor Tour
  - 2020 (2): Glasgow Indoor Grand Prix (1500 m), Liévin Meeting International (800 m)
- British Athletics Championships
  - 800 metres: 2022
- British Indoor Athletics Championships
  - 1500 metres: 2019

== Awards ==
- Scottish Athletics
  - Performer of the Year: 2020 (with Laura Muir and Jake Wightman)
- British Athletics Writers' Association
  - Cliff Temple Award for British Female Athlete of the Year: 2020
