= 2019 European Athletics U23 Championships – Women's 800 metres =

The women's 800 metres event at the 2019 European Athletics U23 Championships was held in Gävle, Sweden, at Gavlehov Stadium Park on 11 and 13 July.

== Medalists ==
Gold	Silver	Bronze
Jemma Reekie; Great Britain	Ellie Baker; Great Britain	Nadia Power; Ireland

== Results ==
=== Heats ===
Qualification: First 2 in each heat (Q) and next 2 fastest (q) qualified for the final.

Rank	Heat	Name	Nationality	Time	Notes
1	3	Jemma Reekie	Great Britain	2:04.74	Q
2	3	Nadia Power	Ireland	2:05.36	Q
3	3	Elena Bellò	Italy	2:05.98	q
4	3	Selina Fehler	Switzerland	2:06.73	q, PB
5	1	Gabriela Gajanová	Slovakia	2:06.80	Q
6	1	Angelika Sarna	Poland	2:06.93	Q
7	2	Ellie Baker	Great Britain	2:07.14	Q
8	1	Camille Muls	Belgium	2:07.18	
9	3	Lena Kandissounon	France	2:07.24	
10	2	Vendula Hluchá	Czech Republic	2:07.78	Q
11	2	Charlotte Pizzo	France	2:07.93	
12	2	Louise Shanahan	Ireland	2:08.31	
13	1	Jenna Bromell	Ireland	2:08.44	
14	2	Astrid Rosvall	Sweden	2:09.27	
15	1	Carolina Hernandez-Pita	Switzerland	2:09.28	
16	1	Jelena Gajić	Bosnia and Herzegovina	2:09.52	
17	3	Oksana Dolynchuk	Ukraine	2:10.03	
18	3	Rahime Tekin	Turkey	2:10.05	
19	2	Daria Vdovychenko	Ukraine	2:12.08	
20	2	Sonja Andenmatten	Switzerland	2:13.93	
	1	Cristina Daniela Balan	Romania	DQ	R163.5(a)
	1	Emilie Berge	Norway	DNS	

=== Final ===
Rank	Name	Nationality	Time	Notes
1st place, gold medalist(s)	Jemma Reekie	Great Britain	2:05.19	
2nd place, silver medalist(s)	Ellie Baker	Great Britain	2:06.33	
3rd place, bronze medalist(s)	Nadia Power	Ireland	2:06.68	
4	Gabriela Gajanová	Slovakia	2:06.78	
5	Angelika Sarna	Poland	2:07.46	
6	Elena Bellò	Italy	2:07.59	
7	Selina Fehler	Switzerland	2:07.79	
8	Vendula Hluchá	Czech Republic	2:09.34	
