= 2019 European Athletics U23 Championships – Women's 1500 metres =

The women's 1500 metres event at the 2019 European Athletics U23 Championships was held in Gävle, Sweden, at Gavlehov Stadium Park on 12 and 14 July.

== Medalists ==
Gold	Silver	Bronze
Jemma Reekie; Great Britain	Elise Vanderelst; Belgium	Marta Zenoni; Italy

== Results ==
=== Heats ===
Qualification: First 4 in each heat (Q) and next 4 fastest (q) qualified for the final.

Rank	Heat	Name	Nationality	Time	Notes
1	2	Salomé Afonso	Portugal	4:21.16	Q
2	2	Jemma Reekie	Great Britain	4:21.35	Q
3	2	Patricia Silva	Portugal	4:22.26	Q
4	2	Elisa Cherubini	Italy	4:22.47	Q
5	2	Burcu Subatan	Turkey	4:22.62	q
6	2	Anna Juul	Denmark	4:23.12	q
7	2	Lucía Rodríguez	Spain	4:23.17	q
8	2	Stephanie Cotter	Ireland	4:25.74	q
9	2	Elin Brink	Sweden	4:28.06	
10	1	Elise Vanderelst	Belgium	4:28.54	Q
11	1	Marta Zenoni	Italy	4:30.47	Q
12	1	Eliza Megger	Poland	4:30.54	Q
13	1	Agueda Muñoz	Spain	4:31.50	Q
14	1	Isabella Andersson	Sweden	4:32.44	
15	2	Elēna Miezava	Latvia	4:32.45	
16	2	Kristine Lande Dommersnes	Norway	4:32.77	
17	1	Marta García	Spain	4:33.43	SB
18	1	Mina Marie Anglero	Norway	4:34.94	
19	1	Roisin Flanagan	Ireland	4:36.36	
20	2	Viktoriya Kovba	Ukraine	4:36.56	
21	1	Malin Edland	Norway	4:37.99	
22	1	Andreia Pingueiro	Portugal	4:38.53	
23	1	Gabrielė Paužaitė	Lithuania	4:38.65	
24	1	Damla Çelik	Turkey	4:48.81	

=== Final ===
Rank	Name	Nationality	Time	Notes
1st place, gold medalist(s)	Jemma Reekie	Great Britain	4:22.81	
2nd place, silver medalist(s)	Elise Vanderelst	Belgium	4:23.50	
3rd place, bronze medalist(s)	Marta Zenoni	Italy	4:23.96	
4	Eliza Megger	Poland	4:25.12	
5	Salomé Afonso	Portugal	4:25.78	
6	Patricia Silva	Portugal	4:26.06	
7	Agueda Muñoz	Spain	4:26.26	
8	Lucía Rodríguez	Spain	4:26.26	
9	Anna Juul	Denmark	4:28.30	
10	Burcu Subatan	Turkey	4:30.01	
11	Elisa Cherubini	Italy	4:32.77	
12	Stephanie Cotter	Ireland	4:35.82	
