= 2017 British Indoor Athletics Championships =

- Dates: 11-12 February
- Host city: Sheffield, United Kingdom
- Venue: EIS Sheffield
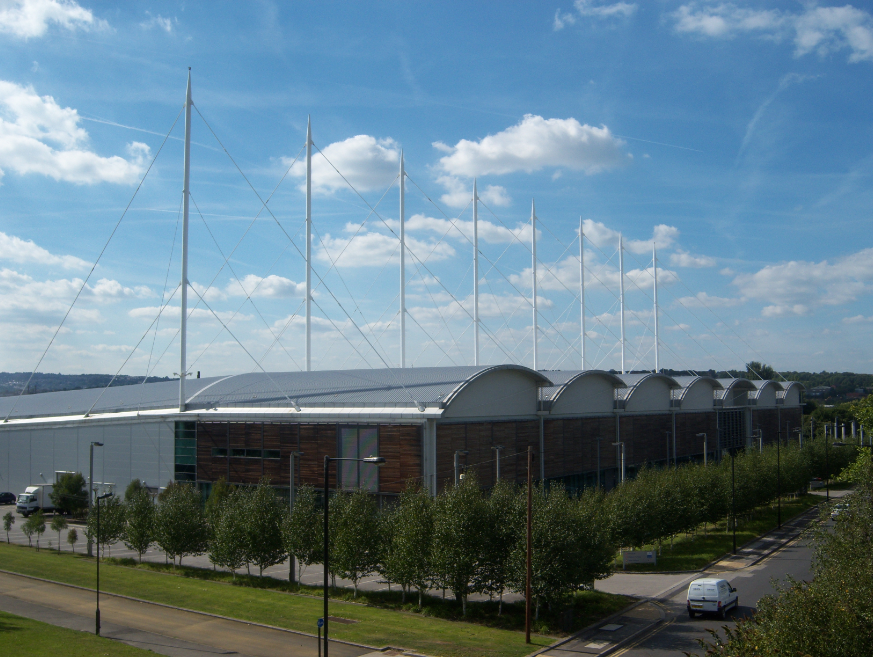
- Level: Senior
- Type: Indoor

The 2017 British Indoor Athletics Championships was a national track and field competition for British athletes, held on 11 and 12 February 2017 at the English Institute of Sport in Sheffield, England. The event served as the team trials for the 2017 European Athletics Indoor Championships. Racewalker Tom Bosworth gave the highlight performance of the meeting, breaking the British record for the 5000 metres walk at 18:39.47 minutes

== Medal summary ==
=== Men ===
| Event | Gold | | Silver | | Bronze | |
|---|---|---|---|---|---|---|
| 60 metres | Andrew Robertson | 6.57 | Theo Etienne | 6.59 | Dwain Chambers | 6.62 |
| 200 m | Antonio Infantino | 21.05 | Connor Wood | 21.19 | Chris Stone | 21.47 |
| 400 m | Jarryd Dunn | 46.97 | Cameron Chalmers | 47.31 | Lee Thompson | 47.87 |
| 800 m | Guy Learmonth | 1:48.19 | Markhim Lonsdale | 1:49.05 PB | Spencer Thomas | 1:49.12 |
| 1500 m | Elliot Giles | 3:45.59 PB | Thomas Lancashire | 3:46.45 | James West | 3:47.36 |
| 3000 m | Lee Emanuel | 7:55.91 | Andrew Heyes | 7:57.00 PB | Nick Goolab | 7:58.13 PB |
| 5000 metres walk^{[nb1]} | Tom Bosworth | 18:39.47 NR | Callum Wilkinson | 19:49.23 | Cameron Corbishley | 21:02.14 |
| 60 metres hurdles | Andrew Pozzi | 7.51 | David King | 7.76 | Jake Porter | 7.86 PB |
| High jump | Allan Smith | 2.25 m | Robbie Grabarz | 2.25 m | Chris Kandu | 2.25 m |
| Pole vault | Luke Cutts | 5.43 m | Max Eaves | 5.43 m | Harry Coppell | 5.32 m |
| Long jump | Dan Bramble | 7.80 m | Ashley Bryant | 7.71 m | Daniel Gardiner | 7.70 m |
| Triple jump | Nathan Fox | 16.53 m | Tosin Oke | 16.40 m | Julian Reid | 16.30 m |
| Shot put | Scott Lincoln | 18.76 m | Youcef Zatat | 18.22 m PB | Joey Watson | 17.16 m |

- ^{nb1} Norwegian athlete Fredrik Vaeng Røtnes competed as a guest in the 5000 m walk and placed third in 20:51.15 minutes.

=== Women ===
| Event | Gold | | Silver | | Bronze | |
|---|---|---|---|---|---|---|
| 60 m | Asha Philip | 7.19 | Shannon Hylton | 7.38 PB | Rachel Miller | 7.47 |
| 200 m | Finette Agyapong | 23.78 | Amy Allcock | 23.89 | Maya Bruney | 24.00 PB |
| 400 m | Eilidh Doyle | 52.63 | Laviai Nielsen | 52.86 | Lina Nielsen | 52.89 PB |
| 800 m | Shelayna Oskan-Clarke | 2:03.54 | Adelle Tracey | 2:04.04 | Mhairi Hendry | 2:05.22 |
| 1500 m | Sarah McDonald | 4:19.41 | Eilish McColgan | 4:19.99 | Revee Walcott-Nolan | 4:21.73 |
| 3000 m^{[nb2]} | Eilish McColgan | 9:05.07 | Stephanie Twell | 9:05.30 | Charlotte Arter | 9:11.79 PB |
| 3000 metres walk | Gemma Bridge | 13:23.59 | Emma Achurch | 13:48.83 | Tatyana Gabellone | 13:49.49 |
| 60 metres hurdles | Mollie Courtney | 8.32 PB | Emma Nwofor | 8.43 PB | Sophie Yorke | 8.46 PB |
| High jump | Morgan Lake Bethan Partridge | 1.89 m | Not awarded | | Philippa Rogan | 1.82 m |
| Pole vault | Jade Ive | 4.35 m PB | Sally Peake | 4.16 m | Courtney MacGuire | 3.94 m |
| Long jump | Lorraine Ugen | 6.72 m | Katarina Johnson-Thompson | 6.69 m | Jazmin Sawyers | 6.54 m |
| Triple jump | Alexandra Russell | 13.27 m | Sara Buggy | 13.08 m | Emily Gargan | 12.47 m PB |
| Shot put | Rachel Wallader | 17.43 m | Sophie McKinna | 16.74 m | Adele Nicoll | 15.93 m |

- ^{nb2} Italian Giulia Viola competed as a guest in the 3000 m race and placed third.
