= Verity Ockenden =

British middle-distance runner

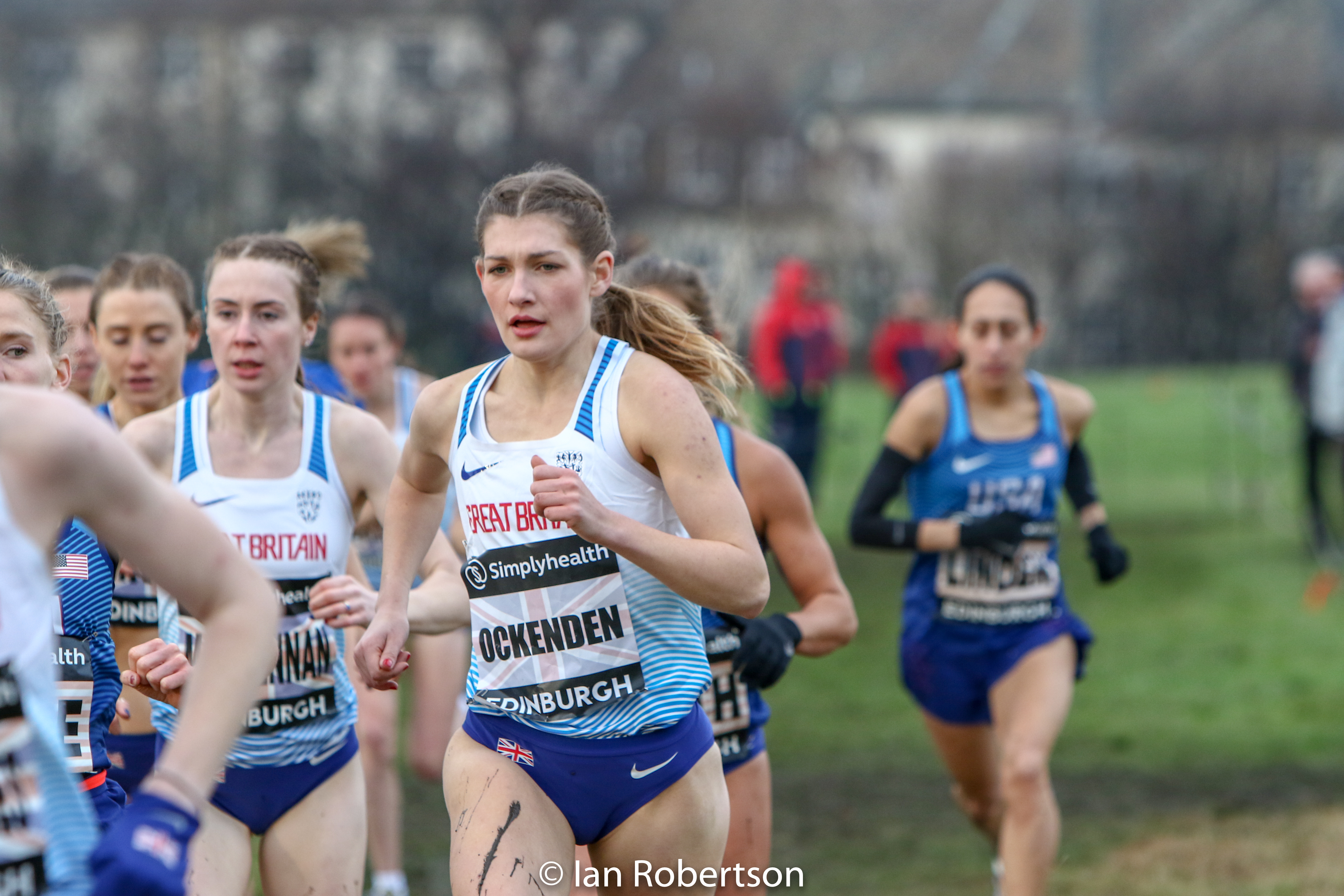
- Ockenden in 2018

Personal information
- Nationality: British
- Born: 31 August 1991 (age 34)

Sport
- Sport: Athletics
- Event: 3000 metres
Medal record
Women's athletics
Representing Great Britain
European Indoor Championships
Bronze medal – third place	2021 Toruń	3000 m

Verity Ockenden (born 31 August 1991) is a British athlete. She competed in the women's 3000 metres event at the 2021 European Athletics Indoor Championships, where she won the bronze medal.
