= 2024 European Athletics Championships – Women's 5000 metres =

Women's 5000 metres at the 2024 European Athletics Championships
- Venue: Stadio Olimpico
- Location: Rome
- Dates: 7 June (final)
- Competitors: 22 from 13 nations
- Winning time: 14:35.29 CR

Medalists
gold medal	Nadia Battocletti	Italy
silver medal	Karoline Bjerkeli Grøvdal	Norway
bronze medal	Marta García	Spain

The women's 5000 metres at the 2024 European Athletics Championships took place at the Stadio Olimpico on 7 June.

== Records ==
Standing records prior to the 2024 European Athletics Championships
World record	Gudaf Tsegay (ETH)	14:00.21	Eugene, United States	17 September 2023
European record	Sifan Hassan (NED)	14:13.42	London, Great Britain	23 July 2023
Championship record	Sifan Hassan (NED)	14:46.12	Berlin, Germany	12 August 2018
World Leading	Tsigie Gebreselama (ETH)	14:18.76	Eugene, United States	25 May 2024
European Leading	Sifan Hassan (NED)	14:34.38	Eugene, United States	25 May 2024

== Schedule ==
Date	Time	Round
7 June 2024	22:40	Final

All times are local times (UTC+2)

== Results ==
Rank	Name	Nationality	Time	Note
1st place, gold medalist(s)	Nadia Battocletti	Italy	14:35.29	CR, NR
2nd place, silver medalist(s)	Karoline Bjerkeli Grøvdal	Norway	14:38:62	SB
3rd place, bronze medalist(s)	Marta García	Spain	14:44:04	NR
4	Maureen Koster	Netherlands	14:44:46	PB
5	Nathalie Blomqvist	Finland	14:44.72	NR
6	Hanna Klein	Germany	14:58.28	SB
7	Federica del Buono	Italy	15:00:05	PB
8	Sarah Madeleine	France	15:02.56	PB
9	Izzy Fry	Great Britain	15:05.66	PB
10	Hannah Nuttall	Great Britain	15:10.65	
11	Amalie Sæten	Norway	15:17:41	PB
12	Viktória Wagner-Gyürkés	Hungary	15:17.45	SB
13	María Forero	Spain	15:19.69	NU23R
14	Kristine Eikrem Engeset	Norway	15:20.02	PB
15	Micol Majori	Italy	15:20.89	PB
16	Agate Caune	Latvia	15:28.04	
17	Jodie McCann	Ireland	15:29.25	PB
18	Emine Hatun Mechaal	Turkey	15:31.30	
19	Amy-Eloise Neale	Great Britain	15:33:45	
20	Burcu Subatan	Turkey	16:16:89	
	Lili Anna Vindics-Tóth	Hungary	DNF	
	Mariana Machado	Portugal	DNF	
