= Christina Aragon =

American runner (born 1997)

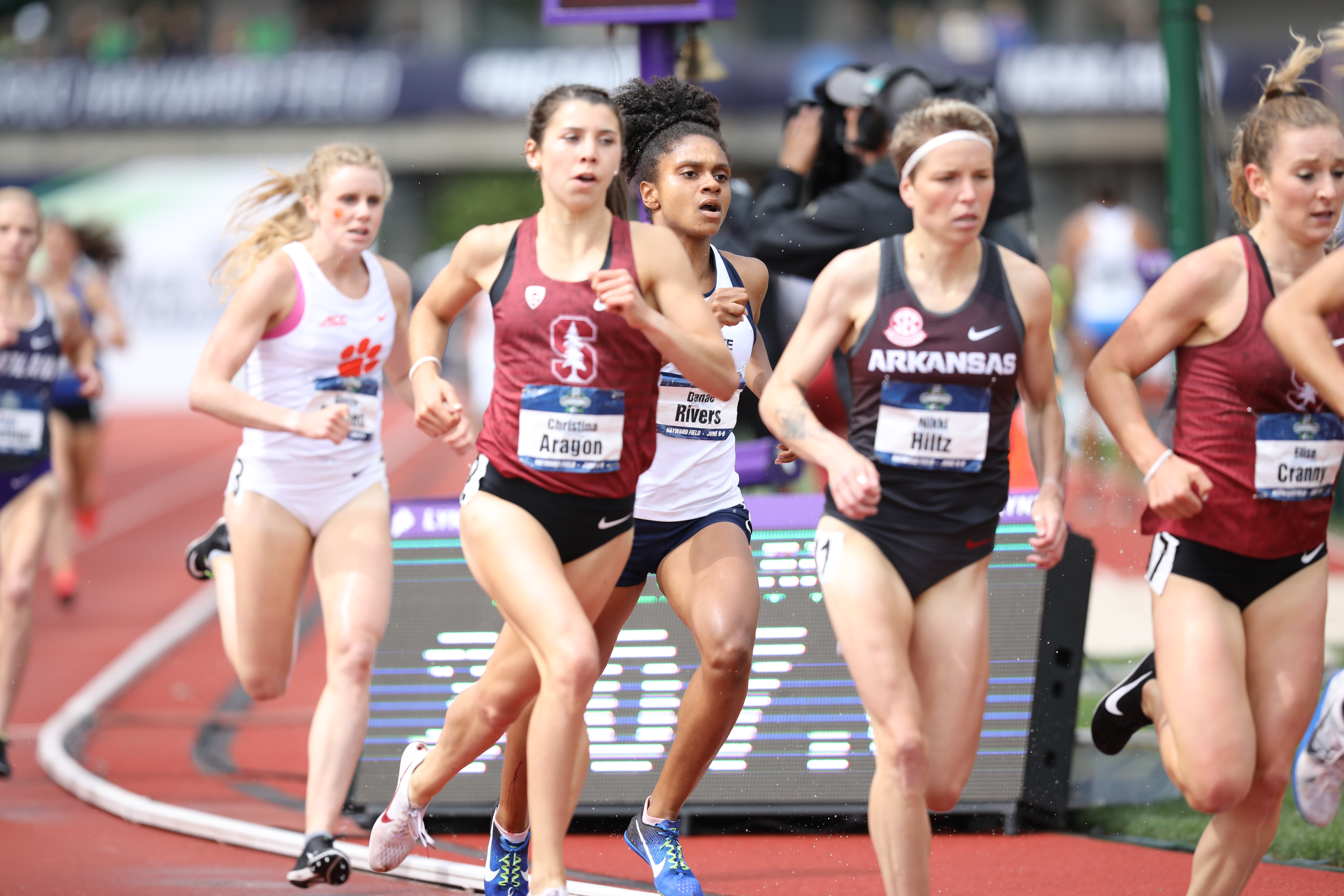
- Aragon at the 2018 NCAA Outdoor Track and Field Championships

Personal information
- Born: June 17, 1997 (age 29) Billings, Montana, U.S.
- Education: Stanford University
- Employer: Nike

Sport
- Sport: Track and field
- Event: 1500 m
- University team: Stanford Cardinal
- Club: Bowerman Track Club

Achievements and titles
- Personal bests: 1500 m: 4:05.36 (Eugene 2024); Mile: 4:30.91 (Boston 2024)
Medal record
Women's track and field
Representing United States
World U20 Championships
Bronze medal – third place	2016 Bydogoszcz	1500 m

Christina Aragon (born 17 June 1997) is an American middle-distance runner who specializes in the 1500 metres. She competed collegiately for Stanford University (2016–2022) and since 2022, has been a part of the Bowerman Track Club. She won a bronze medal in the 1500 m at the 2016 World U20 Championships.

== High school ==
Aragon rose to prominence as a high school athlete, where she won 12 Montana Class AA state titles representing Billings Senior High School and won Gatorade Montana Track and Field Athlete of the Year in 2015 and 2016.

In 2015, her junior year, she won the 800 m at the Brooks PR Invitational in 2:04.00 and the Dream Mile at the Adidas Grand Prix in New York City.

The following year, she ran a 1500 m personal best of 4:09.27 at the Portland Track Festival, placing her fourth on the all-time high school list and finished second at the USA Junior Championships, earning her a spot on the US team for the 2016 IAAF World U20 Championships in Bydogoszcz, Poland.

In July, Aragon competed at the 2016 US Olympic Trials, advancing to the semi-finals where she was eliminated. Later that month, at the World U20 Championships, she earned a bronze medal in a personal best of 4:08.71.

== Stanford University ==
Joining the Stanford Cardinal track and field and cross country teams for the 2016–17 season, Aragon took second at the Pac-12 Championships in the 800 m and qualified for the NCAA final in the 1500 m, placing seventh.

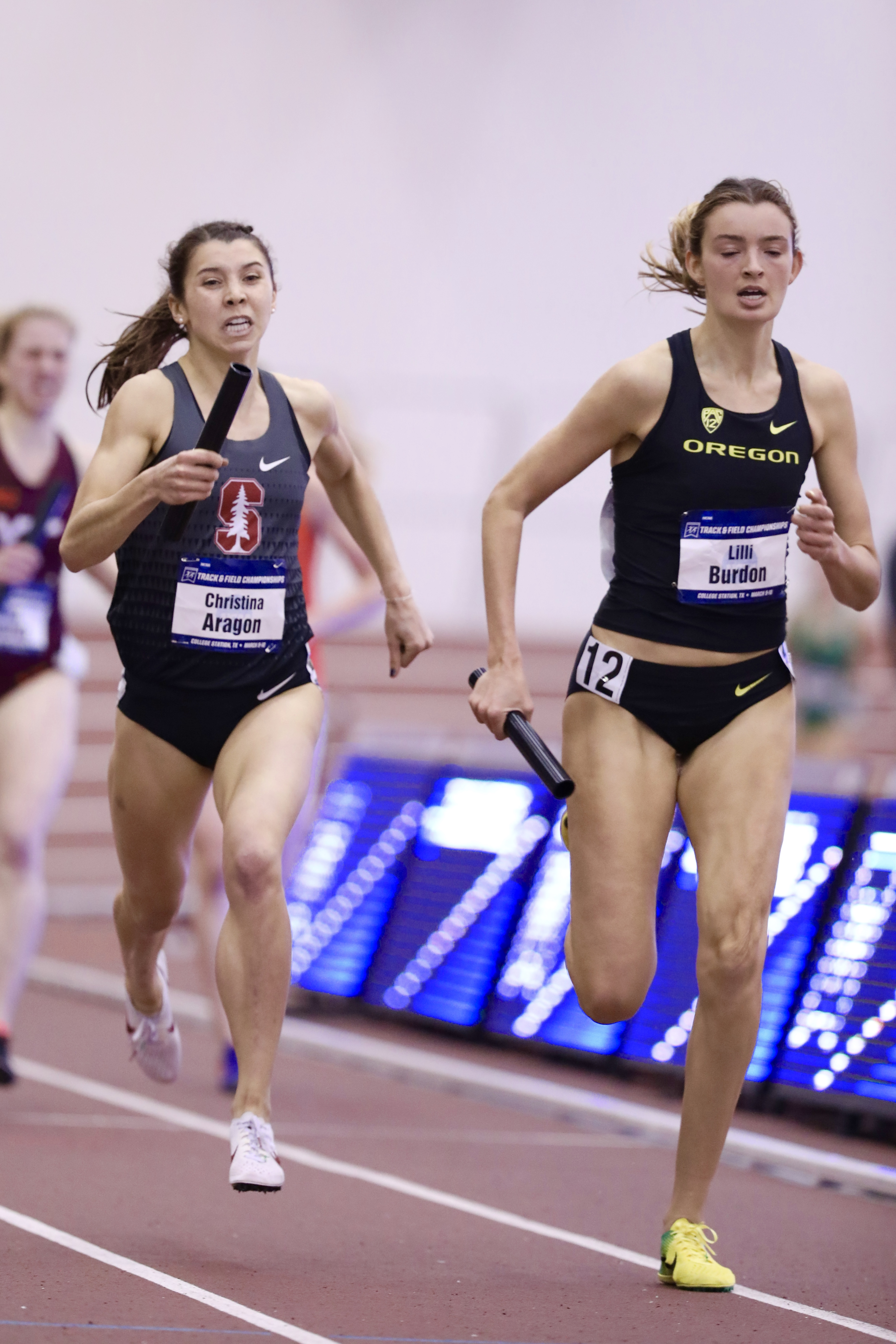
Aragon (left) in the DMR the 2018 NCAA Indoor Track and Field Championships

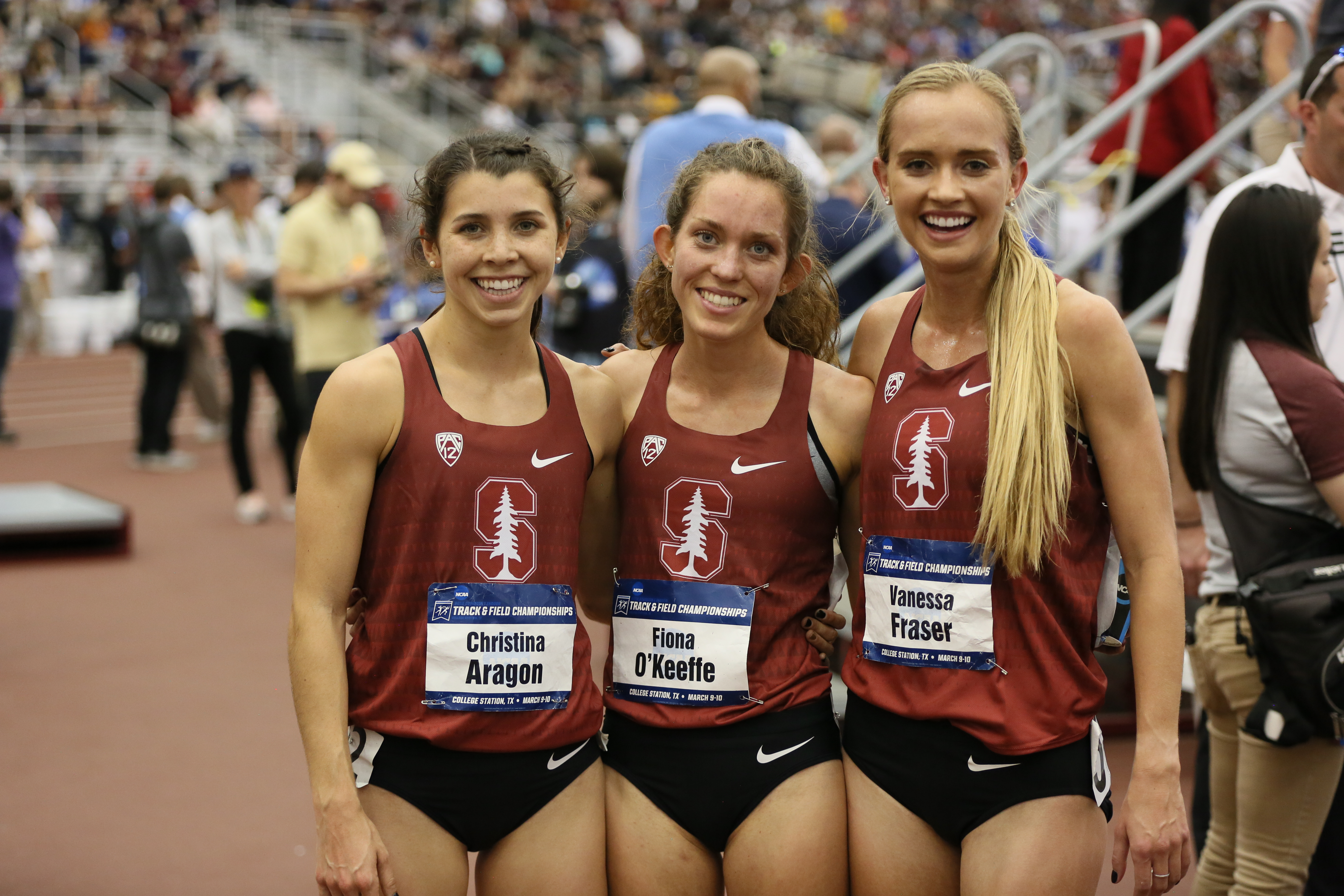
Aragon (left) with Fiona O'Keeffe (centre) and Vanessa Fraser (right) at the 2018 NCAA Indoor Track and Field Championships

Competing at her first NCAA Indoor Track and Field Championships in 2018, Aragon, anchoring the Stanford DMR, placed second. The day after the DMR, she competed in the 3000 m, placing seventh. Outdoors, she improved upon her NCAA 1500 m performance from the previous year, placing fourth.

After redshirting the 2018–19 cross country and track and field seasons, Aragon qualified for the 2020 NCAA Indoor Championships, which was later cancelled.

In 2021, Aragon won a bronze medal at the Pac-12 Championships and placed eighth at the NCAA Outdoor Track and Field Championships in the 1500 m.

In 2022, Aragon and the Stanford quartet replicated their performance from the 2018 NCAA Indoor Championships, placing second in the NCAA at the NCAA Indoor Track and Field Championships in Birmingham, Alabama. In her final, collegiate race, Aragon finished third in 1500 m at the NCAA Outdoor Championships, her highest individual finish at an NCAA Championship.

== Bowerman Track Club ==
On September 19, 2022, Aragon announced she had signed professionally with Nike and joined the Bowerman Track Club, under coaches Jerry Schumacher and Shalane Flanagan.

In 2023, her first professional season, she failed to qualify for the final in the 1500 m at the USA Track and Field Championships, placing sixth in her heat in July. Later that summer, she ran a seasons best of 4:09.19 at the Harry Jerome Track Classic in British Columbia, her fastest 1500 m since 2016.

In February 2024, Aragon set a personal best of 4:30.91 in the mile at Boston University.

== Personal life ==
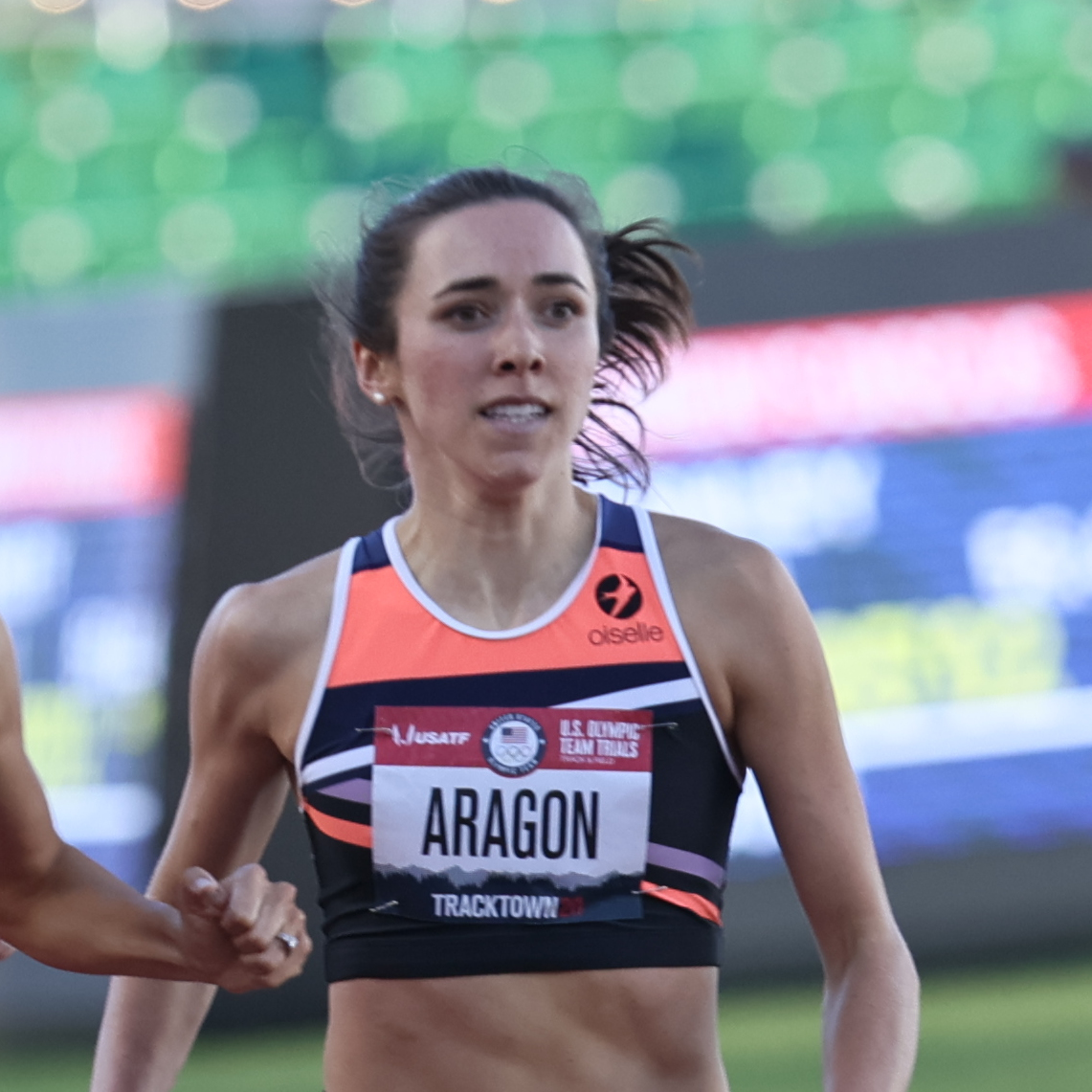
Christina's sister, Dani, competing at the 2020 US Olympic Trials.

Both of Aragon's parents: Chuck and Kathy Aragon, were elite runners. Her father Chuck Aragon, finished fourth at the 1984 Olympic Trials in the 1500 m. Her mother Kathy Aragon (née Pfiefer), ran collegiately for New Mexico and qualified for three Olympic Trials.

She also has two sisters: Alexa and Danielle, both of whom ran collegiately for the Notre Dame Fighting Irish.
