= Ellie Baker =

British middle-distance runner

Personal information
- Full name: Ellie Natasha Baker
- Born: 3 June 1998 (age 28) Borehamwood, England

Sport
- Country: Great Britain; England
- Sport: Athletics
- Events: 800 metres, 1500 m
- Club: Shaftesbury Barnet Harriers
- Coached by: John Bigg
Medal record
Women's athletics
Representing Great Britain
European U23 Championships
| Silver medal – second place | 2019 Gävle | 800 m |
European U20 Championships
| Silver medal – second place | 2017 Grosseto | 800 m |

Ellie Baker (born 3 June 1998) is a British athlete specialising in the 800 metres and 1500 metres. She won silver medals in the 800 m at the 2019 European Under-23 Championships and 2017 European U20 Championships.

Baker competed for Great Britain in the 800 m at the 2021 European Indoor Championships in Toruń, Poland, and the 2022 World Championships held in Eugene, Oregon.

In February 2023, the 24-year-old claimed a maiden national title, winning the 1500 m at the British Indoor Championships with a time of 4:06.73 and breaking Zola Budd's 1986 championship record in the process.

== Personal life ==
Ellie Baker was raised in Borehamwood, Hertfordshire in the United Kingdom. She has two siblings and attended Townsend Church of England School in St Albans. Baker first started running competitively for Herts Phoenix Athletic Club before joining Shaftesbury Barnet Harriers. Baker has been in a relationship with fellow Great Britain athlete Kyle Langford for a number of years. On 21 January 2025 the two of them announced their engagement in a post on their social media.
