= Sarah Healy =

Irish middle-distance runner (born 2001)

Personal information
- Born: 13 February 2001 (age 25) Monkstown, Dublin

Sport
- Country: Ireland

Achievements and titles
- Personal bests: Outdoor; 1500 m: 3:57.15 (2025); Mile: 4:16.26 (2025); 3000 m: 8:25.63 (2026); Indoor; 1500 m: 4:01.62 (2025) NR; 3000 m: 8:30.79 (2025) NR
Medal record
Women's athletics
Representing Ireland
European Indoor Championships
Gold medal – first place	2025 Apeldoorn	3000 m
European Athletics U18 Championships
Gold medal – first place	2018 Győr	1500 m
Gold medal – first place	2018 Győr	3000 m

Sarah Healy (born 13 February 2001 in Monkstown, Dublin) is an Irish middle-distance runner. She is the 2025 European Indoor 3000 m champion.

Healy won gold medals in the 1500 m and 3000 m at the 2018 European U18 Championships. She won silvers in the 1500 m at both the 2019 European U20 and 2023 European U23 Championships. She is the Irish record holder for both the indoor 1500 m and 3000 m. She is a seven-time Irish national champion.

== Career ==
She won gold for the 1500m and 3000m at the 2018 European Athletics U18 Championships in Győr, Hungary. Healy won silver in the 1500 m the following year at the European U20s. She won the Irish National Cross Country Championships in November 2022.

In 2023 she joined the M11 Track club, run by Trevor Painter and Jenny Meadows. In June 2023, she won the 1500 m race at the Paavo Nurmi Games, running 4:03.85 to narrowly beat Gaia Sabbatini who ran 4:03.88. At the European U23 Championships held in Espoo, she won silver in the 1500 m, finishing behind her Irish teammate Sophie O'Sullivan. In August, Healy qualified for the semi-finals of the 1500 metres at the World Championships, where she clocked a time of 3:59.68 to finish eighth, marking her first time under the 4-minute barrier.

In February 2024, Healy broke the Irish indoor 3000 m record in Metz, running a time of 8:36.06. Later that month, she also broke the Irish indoor 1500 m record in Lievin, running 4:03.83. In July 2024, she ran a major personal best of 3:57.46 to finish seventh at the Paris Diamond League. At the 2024 Summer Olympics, Healy finished seventh in the heats of the 1500 metres, just outside of the automatic qualifiers. In the repechage round she again finished just outside of the qualifiers for the semi-finals, in fourth place.

On 9 March 2025, Healy won gold for the 3000 m at the European Indoor Championships in Apeldoorn. In May 2025, she ran a personal best of 8:27.02 to finish third in the 3000 metres at the Rabat Diamond League. At the Golden Gala on 6 June, she picked up her first career Diamond League win, winning the 1500 m in 3:59.17. Later that month, Healy improved her 1500 m personal best to 3:57.15 by finishing second behind Nelly Chepchirchir at the Paris Diamond League. She improved her mile personal best to 4:16.26 by finishing third at the London Athletics Meet on 19 July. In September 2025, Healy finished tenth in the 1500 m final at the World Championship in Tokyo.

On 11 August 2026, Healy finished fourth in the 5000 m at the European Championships in Birmingham, England. Five days later she placed fifth in the 1500 m.
