= Fantu Worku =

Ethiopian middle-distance runner

Personal information
- Born: 29 March 1999 (age 26)

Sport
- Sport: Athletics
- Event: 1500 metres

Fantu Worku Taye (born 29 March 1999) is an Ethiopian middle-distance runner specialising in the 1500 metres. She won the silver medal at the 2016 World U20 Championships. She represented her country at the 2017 World Championships narrowly missing the semifinals.

At the 2018 Anniversary Games in London, she stopped racing half a lap early after sprinting to first place, mistaking the quarter mile line as the finish line and then proceeding to stop running once crossing it.

== International competitions ==
Year	Competition	Venue	Position	Event	Notes
Representing Ethiopia
2016	African Championships	Durban, South Africa	4th	1500 m	4:05.84
2016	World U20 Championships	Bydgoszcz, Poland	2nd	1500 m	4:08.43
2017	African Junior Championships	Tlemcen, Algeria	2nd	1500 m	4:30.76
2017	World Championships	London, United Kingdom	19th (h)	1500 m	4:05.81
2018	World Indoor Championships	Birmingham, United Kingdom	6th	3000 m	8:50.54
2019	World Championships	Doha, Qatar	6th	5000 m	14:40.47

== Personal bests ==
Outdoor

- 1500 metres – 4:05.81 (London 2017)

Indoor

- 1500 metres – 4:08.56 (Ostrava 2017)
- 3000 metres – 8:50.36 (Eaubonne 2017)
