= Águeda Marqués =

Spanish athlete

Personal information
- Full name: Águeda Marqués Muñoz
- Nationality: Spanish
- Born: Águeda Muñoz Marqués; 19 March 1999 (age 27) Segovia, Spain

Sport
- Sport: Athletics
- Events: 800m, 1500m, 3000m

Águeda Marqués Muñoz (Note: In this Spanish name, the first or paternal surname is Marqués and the second or maternal family name is Muñoz.) (born Águeda Muñoz Marqués; 19 March 1999) is a Spanish track and field athlete who competes primarily over 1500m on the track, but also competes as a cross-country runner.

== Early life ==
From Segovia, Castile and León, Marqués was a promising youngster, winning the silver medal in the 1000 metres for her age group at the Spanish championships in 2014. In February 2020 she was bronze medalist in the Spanish under-23 indoors championships over 3000m. She became the under-23 champion of Spain over 800 metres on 30 September 2020.

== Career ==
=== Track ===
Marqués ran in the 1500m at the 2021 European Athletics Indoor Championships in Torun, Poland, and qualified for the final after running a personal best time of 4:09:94 in the heats. However, after finishing seventh in the final she was disqualified after the event for jostling.

Marqués was selected for the 1500m at the 2022 European Athletics Championships. This came after she was runner-up to Marta Perez for the Spanish national 1500 metres title in June 2022.

Marqués was runner-up to Esther Guerrero in the Spanish indoors national championships 1500m in February 2023. She qualified for the final of the 2023 European Athletics Indoor Championships in the 1500 metres. In the final she ran a personal best time of 4.08.72, to finish seventh.

In June 2023, she finished third in the 5000m at the 2023 European Athletics Team Championships in Silesia, Poland. She was selected for the 1500m at the 2023 World Athletics Championships in Budapest.

She was selected for the 2024 World Athletics Indoor Championships in Glasgow where she competed in the women's 3000 metres race.

She finished second at the Spanish Championships 1500 metres in June 2024. She competed in the 1500 metres at the 2024 Summer Olympics in Paris in August 2024, running a personal best on her way to the final and a 4:00.31 new personal best in the final.

She had a sixth-place finish in the 1500 metres at the Diamond League event at the 2025 Golden Gala in Rome on 6 June 2025. The following week, she ran a personal best 8:34.27 for the 3000 metres in Stockholm at the 2025 BAUHAUS-galan, both events part of the 2025 Diamond League. In September 2025, she competed over 1500 metres at the 2025 World Championships in Tokyo, Japan, without advancing to the semi-finals.

On 19 June 2026, she had a too-five finish in 4:04.61 for the 1500 metres at the 2026 Doha Diamond League.

=== Cross-country ===
Marqués also competes in cross country running, and with her club won the title of Spanish cross-country champions, in November 2022. She selected to represent Spain in the 2022 European Cross Country Championships in Turin on 11 December 2022. She finished seventeenth in the individual event as the Spanish women finished fourth overall.

== International competitions ==
Year	Competition	Venue	Position	Event	Notes
Representing Spain
2016	European Youth Championships	Tbilisi, Georgia	8th	1500 m	4:36.00
2017	European U20 Championships	Grosseto, Italy	11th (h)	1500 m	4:30.00
2018	World U20 Championships	Tampere, Finland	14th (h)	1500 m	4:30.63
2019	European U23 Championships	Gävle, Sweden	7th	100 m	4:26.26
2021	European Indoor Championships	Toruń, Poland	—	1500 m i	DQ
2021	European U23 Championships	Tallinn, Estonia	4th	1500 m	4:14.87
2022	Ibero-American Championships	La Nucía, Spain	2nd	1500 m	4:16.42
2022	European Championships	Munich, Germany	11th (h)	1500 m	4:07.78
2022	European Cross Country Championships	Venaria Reale, Italy	17th	7662 m XC	27:56
2023	European Indoor Championships	Istanbul, Turkey	7th	1500 m i	4:08.72
2023	European Games	Kraków, Poland	4th	5000 m	15:31.04
2023	World Championships	Budapest, Hungary	34th (h)	1500 m	4:06.41
2024	World Indoor Championships	Glasgow, United Kingdom	14th	3000 m i	8:48.57
2024	Olympic Games	Paris, France	11th	1500 m	4:00.31
2025	European Indoor Championships	Apeldoorn, Netherlands	16th (h)	3000 m i	9:09.36
2025	World Championships	Tokyo, Japan	14th (h)	1500 m	4:04.13
