= 2025 European Athletics Indoor Championships – Women's 3000 metres =

Women's 3000 metres at the 2025 European Athletics Indoor Championships
- Venue: Omnisport Apeldoorn
- Location: Apeldoorn, Netherlands
- Dates: 8 March 2025 (round 1); 9 March 2025 (final)
- Competitors: 23 from 13 nations
- Winning time: 8:52.86

Medalists
gold medal	Sarah Healy	Ireland
silver medal	Melissa Courtney-Bryant	Great Britain
bronze medal	Salomé Afonso	Portugal

The women's 3000 metres at the 2025 European Athletics Indoor Championships was held on the short track of Omnisport in Apeldoorn, Netherlands, on 8 and 9 March 2025. This was the 25th time the event was contested at the European Athletics Indoor Championships. Athletes can qualify by achieving the entry standard or by their World Athletics Ranking in the event.

Round 1 is scheduled for 8 March during the morning session. The final is scheduled for 9 March during the evening session.

== Background ==
The women's 3000 metres was contested 24 times before 2025, held every time since the 1982 edition of the European Athletics Indoor Championships. The 2025 European Athletics Indoor Championships will be held in Omnisport Apeldoorn in Apeldoorn, Netherlands. The removable indoor athletics track was retopped for these championships in September 2024.

Genzebe Dibaba is the world record holder in the event, with a time of 8:16.60 set in 2021. Laura Muir is the European record holder with a time of 8:26.41, set in 2017. Muir also holds the championships record, set at the 2019 championships.

Records before the 2025 European Athletics Indoor Championships
Record	Athlete (nation)	Time (s)	Location	Date
World record	Genzebe Dibaba (ETH)	8:16.60	Stockholm, Sweden	6 February 2014
European record	Laura Muir (GBR)	8:26.41	Karlsruhe, Germany	4 February 2017
Championship record	Laura Muir (GBR)	8:30.61	Glasgow, Great Britain	1 March 2019
World leading	Freweyni Hailu (ETH)	8:19.98	Liévin, France	13 February 2025
European leading	Melissa Courtney-Bryant (GBR)	8:28.69	Boston, United States	2 February 2025

== Qualification ==
For the women's 3000 metres, the qualification period runs from 25 February 2024 until 23 February 2025. Athletes can qualify by achieving the entry standards of 8:48.00 s indoors or 8:39.00 s outdoors, or by virtue of their World Athletics Ranking for the event. There is a target number of 24 athletes.

== Rounds ==
=== Round 1 ===
Round 1 was held on 8 March, starting at 10:20 (UTC+1) in the morning. First 6 in each heat (Q) qualify for the final.

==== Heat 1 ====
Rank	Athlete	Nation	Time	Notes
1	Sarah Healy	Ireland	8:55.35	Q
2	Maureen Koster	Netherlands	8:55.40	Q
3	Ludovica Cavalli	Italy	8:55.47	Q
4	Lea Meyer	Germany	8:56.36	Q
5	Innes FitzGerald	Great Britain	8:58.44	Q
6	Lisa Rooms	Belgium	9:01.88	Q
7	Idaira Prieto	Spain	9:04.15	
8	Olimpia Breza	Poland	9:08.83	
9	Veerle Bakker	Netherlands	9:09.21	
10	Linn Söderholm	Sweden	9:15.92	
11	Lili Anna Vindics-Tóth	Hungary	9:28.22	
—	Gresa Bakraçi	Kosovo	DNS	

==== Heat 2 ====
Rank	Athlete	Nation	Time	Notes
1	Melissa Courtney-Bryant	Great Britain	9:08.19	Q
2	Marta García	Spain	9:08.23	Q
3	Weronika Lizakowska	Poland	9:08.40	Q
4	Salomé Afonso	Portugal	9:08.46	Q
5	Sarah Madeleine	France	9:08.56	Q
6	Hannah Nuttall	Great Britain	9:08.97	Q
7	Águeda Marqués	Spain	9:09.36	
8	Federica Del Buono	Italy	9:11.39	
9	Micol Majori	Italy	9:13.01	
10	Jodie McCann	Ireland	9:18.73	
11	Jennifer Gulikers	Netherlands	9:19.22	
12	Agate Caune	Latvia	9:22.00	

=== Final ===
The final was held on 9 March, starting at 17:36 (UTC+1) in the evening.

Rank	Athlete	Nation	Time	Notes
1st place, gold medalist(s)	Sarah Healy	Ireland	8:52.86	
2nd place, silver medalist(s)	Melissa Courtney-Bryant	Great Britain	8:52.92	
3rd place, bronze medalist(s)	Salomé Afonso	Portugal	8:53.42	
4	Marta García	Spain	8:53.67	
5	Sarah Madeleine	France	8:53.96	
6	Hannah Nuttall	Great Britain	8:54.60	
7	Lea Meyer	Germany	8:55.62	
8	Innes FitzGerald	Great Britain	8:57.00	
9	Lisa Rooms	Belgium	9:04.90	
10	Weronika Lizakowska	Poland	9:06.84	
11	Ludovica Cavalli	Italy	9:07.20	
—	Maureen Koster	Netherlands	DNF	
