= 2021 European Athletics Indoor Championships – Women's 3000 metres =

The Women's 3000 metres event at the 2021 European Athletics Indoor Championships was held on 4th of March, 2021 at 19:30 (heats), and on 5th of March, 2019 at 21:00 (final) local time.

== Medalists ==
Gold	Silver	Bronze
Amy-Eloise Markovc; Great Britain	Alice Finot; France	Verity Ockenden; Great Britain

== Records ==
Standing records prior to the 2021 European Athletics Indoor Championships
World record	Genzebe Dibaba (ETH)	8:16.60	Stockholm, Sweden	6 February 2014
European record	Laura Muir (GBR)	8:26.41	Karlsruhe, Germany	4 February 2017
Championship record	Laura Muir (GBR)	8:30.61	Glasgow, United Kingdom	1 March 2019
World Leading	Gudaf Tsegay (ETH)	8:22.65	Madrid, Spain	24 February 2021
European Leading	Sifan Hassan (NED)	8:33.62	Liévin, France	9 February 2021

== Results ==
=== Heats ===
Qualification: First 4 in each heat (Q) and the next 4 fastest (q) advance to the Final.

Rank	Heat	Athlete	Nationality	Time	Note
1	2	Verity Ockenden	Great Britain	8:52.60	Q
2	2	Amelia Quirk	Great Britain	8:53.21	PB, Q
3	2	Viktória Wagner-Gyürkés	Hungary	8:55.72	Q
4	1	Amy-Eloise Markovc	Great Britain	8:56.26	Q
5	1	Elena Burkard	Germany	8:56.56	PB, Q
6	2	Lucía Rodríguez	Spain	8:56.71	PB, Q
7	1	Meraf Bahta	Sweden	8:56.85	SB, Q
8	1	Maureen Koster	Netherlands	8:56.91	Q
9	1	Selamawit Bayoulgn	Israel	8:57.26	q
10	1	Alice Finot	France	8:57.28	q
11	2	Nataliya Strebkova	Ukraine	8:59.15	q, PB
12	2	Mariana Machado	Portugal	8:59.39	q, PB
13	1	Alberte Kjær Pedersen	Denmark	9:00.80	NR
14	1	Marta García	Spain	9:02.00	PB
15	2	Lea Meyer	Germany	9:05.13	
16	1	Michelle Finn	Ireland	9:05.44	
17	2	Linn Nilsson	Sweden	9:06.55	SB
18	1	Klara Lukan	Slovenia	9:06.82	
19	2	Blanca Fernández	Spain	9:11.06	
20	1	Ludovica Cavalli	Italy	9:14.85	
21	1	Samrawit Mengsteab	Sweden	9:15.10	
22	2	Giulia Aprile	Italy	9:17.66	
	2	Roxana Rotaru	Romania	DNF	
	2	Maruša Mišmaš-Zrimsek	Slovenia	DQ	
	2	Jip Vastenburg	Netherlands	DQ	

=== Final ===
Rank	Athlete	Nationality	Time	Note
1st place, gold medalist(s)	Amy-Eloise Markovc	Great Britain	8:46.43	PB
2nd place, silver medalist(s)	Alice Finot	France	8:46.54	PB
3rd place, bronze medalist(s)	Verity Ockenden	Great Britain	8:46.60	PB
4	Meraf Bahta	Sweden	8:48.78	SB
5	Amelia Quirk	Great Britain	8:48.82	PB
6	Selamawit Bayoulgn	Israel	8:49.13	
7	Elena Burkard	Germany	8:51.09	PB
8	Lucía Rodríguez	Spain	8:53.90	PB
9	Nataliya Strebkova	Ukraine	8:54.18	PB
10	Viktória Wagner-Gyürkés	Hungary	9:02.81	
11	Mariana Machado	Portugal	9:19.61	
	Maureen Koster	Netherlands	DNF	
