= Maya Bruney =

British sprinter (born 1998)

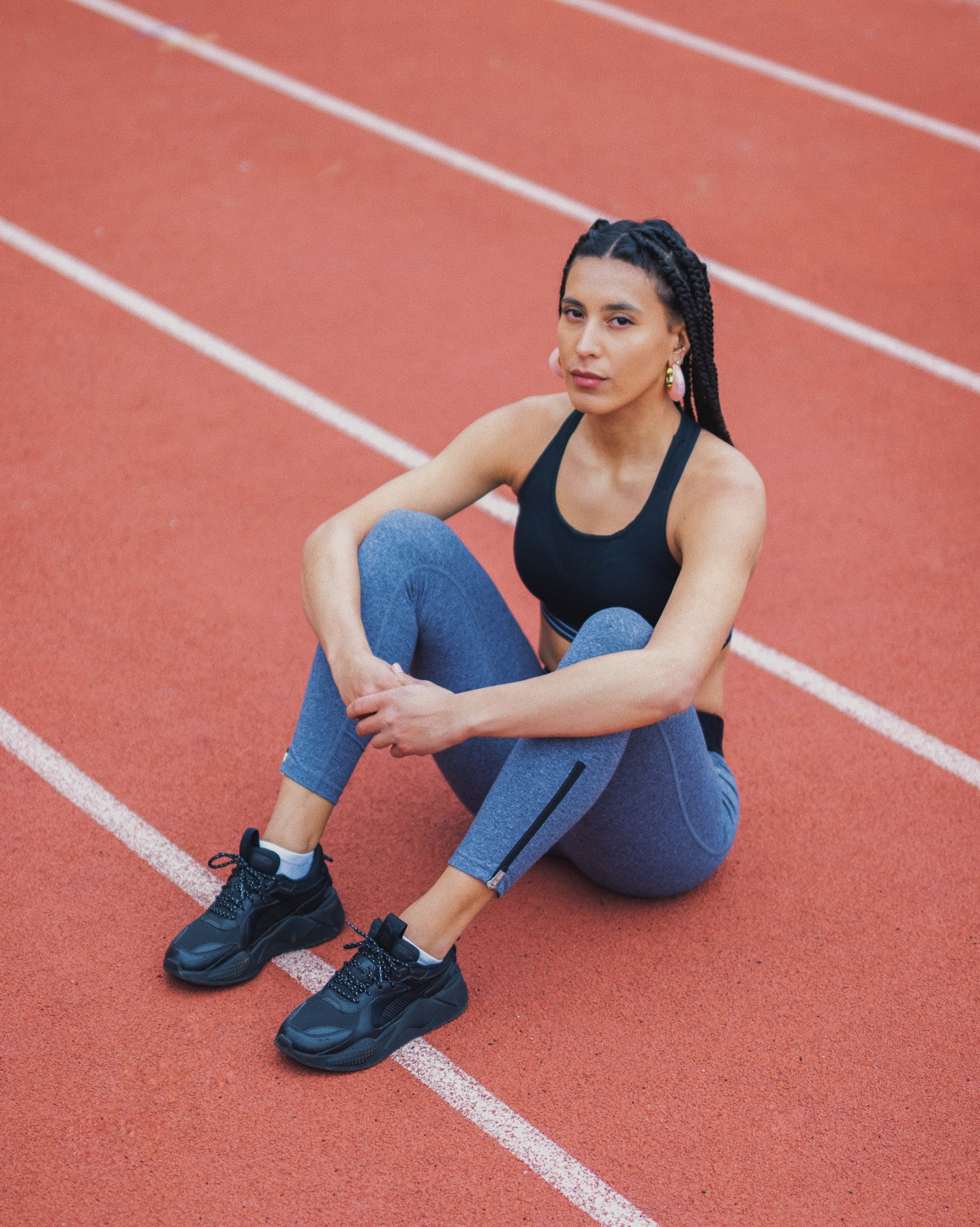

Personal information
- Nationality: Italian; British
- Born: 24 February 1998 (age 28) London, United Kingdom
- Education: University of East London; BRIT School

Sport
- Country: Italy (2021–); Great Britain (–2020)
- Sport: Athletics
- Event: Sprints
Medal record
Women's athletics
Representing Great Britain
European U20 Championships
Gold medal – first place	2017 Grosseto	200 m
Bronze medal – third place	2017 Grosseto	4x100 m relay
Bronze medal – third place	2017 Grosseto	4x400 m relay

Maya Bruney (born 24 February 1998) is a British-Italian sprinter who has been competing for Italy since 2021. Running for Great Britain, she won the gold medal in the 200 metres and bronze medals for the 4 × 100 and 4 × 400 metres relays at the 2017 European Under-20 Championships.

== Biography ==
Maya Bruney was born in London, UK. She has dual nationality as her mother is Italian. From 2012 to 2016, Bruney attended the BRIT School in Croydon. In July 2014, she was awarded the BRIT School excellence in design award for a sneaker design, and in July 2016, was awarded for the second time for her end of year design portfolio. Her portfolio gave her different offers and she chose University of East London. Bruney started athletics at age seven and began competing in the long jump and sprints events three years later. At age 12, she transferred from South London Harriers to Blackheath and Bromley Harriers where she was coached by her father.

In 2011, Bruney became the 200 metres English Schools' Athletics Championships winner. At the 2012 edition of this championships, she became the 100 metres champion and was part of the U15 record-breaking Surrey 4 x 100 m relay team, coached by her father. To this day, the team holds the British U15 Record in a time of 47.37.

In February 2017, Bruney won the bronze medal in the 200 m at the British Indoor Athletics Championships. Outdoors in April, she became the BUCS 200 m champion. In July, the 19-year-old became the only athlete to achieve a hat-trick of medals at the 2017 European Under-20 Championships in Grosseto, Italy. She won the 200 m with a time of 23.04 seconds and earned bronze medals for the 4 x 100 m and 4 x 400 m relays. After her successful 2017 season, Bruney was nominated for the European Athlete of the Year award.

In February 2021, World Athletics confirmed her transfer of allegiance from Britain to Italy. She now competes for female athletic club in Italy, Bracco Atletica. In February 2022, Bruney placed third in the 400 m at the Italian Indoor Championships.

== Achievements ==
=== International competitions ===
Year	Competition	Venue	Position	Event	Time
Representing Great Britain
2017	European U20 Championships	Grosseto, Italy	1st	200 m	23.04 EU20L
2017	European U20 Championships	Grosseto, Italy	3rd	4 × 100 m relay	44.17
2017	European U20 Championships	Grosseto, Italy	3rd	4 × 400 m relay	3:33.68
Representing Italy
2022	Mediterranean Games	Oran, Algeria	8th	200 m	23.81

=== Personal bests ===
- 60 metres indoor – 7.45 (Newham 2018)

- 100 metres – 11.82 (+1.4 m/s, Newham 2017)
- 200 metres – 23.04 (−1.0 m/s, Grosseto 2017)
  - 200 metres indoor – 24.00 (Sheffield 2017)
- 400 metres – 53.10 (Bedford 2018)
- 4 × 400 m split – 51.70 (Grosseto 2017)
  - 400 metres indoor – 53.19 (Columbia, SC 2022)

=== National championships ===
Year	Competition	Venue	Position	Event	Time
2011	English Schools' Championships	Gateshead, United Kingdom	1st	200 m	24.74
2012	English Schools' Championships	Gateshead, United Kingdom	1st	100 m	12.10
2012	English Schools' Championships	Gateshead, United Kingdom	1st	4 × 100 m relay	47.37
2017	British Indoor Championships	Sheffield, United Kingdom	3rd	200 m i	24.00
2017	BUCS Championships	Bedford, United Kingdom	1st	200 m	23.95 (−2.9)
2017	BUCS Championships	Bedford, United Kingdom	1st	4 × 100 m relay	45.76
2018	BUCS Championships	Bedford, United Kingdom	1st	400 m	53.1
2022	Italian Championships	Ancona, Italy	3rd	400 m	53.80
2022	Italian Championships	Ancona, Italy	1st	4 × 400 m relay	3:39.14
