= Beatha Nishimwe =

Rwadan middle-distance runner

Personal information
- Born: 1 December 1998 (age 27) Uwinkingi, Nyamagabe District, Rwanda
- Height: 1.60 m (5 ft 3 in)
- Weight: 48 kg (106 lb)

Sport
- Sport: Track and field
- Event: 1500 metres

Beatha Nishimwe (born 1 December 1998) is a Rwandan middle-distance runner. She competed in the 1500 metres at the 2016 IAAF World Indoor Championships without qualifying for the final.

== Competition record ==
Year	Competition	Venue	Position	Event	Notes
Representing Rwanda
2015	African Junior Championships	Addis Ababa, Ethiopia	5th	1500 m	4:40.49
2015	African Youth Championships	Réduit, Mauritius	1st	1500 m	4:17.37
2015	World Youth Championships	Cali, Colombia	10th	1500 m	4:23.16
2016	World Indoor Championships	Portland, United States	19th (h)	1500 m	4:19.39
2016	African Championships	Durban, South Africa	7th	1500 m	4:08.75
2016	World U20 Championships	Bydgoszcz, Poland	6th	1500 m	4:12.33
2018	Commonwealth Games	Gold Coast, Australia	17th (h)	1500 m	4:14.96
2018	African Championships	Asaba, Nigeria	8th	1500 m	4:19.55

== Personal bests ==
Outdoor

- 1500 metres – 4:08.75 (Durban 2016)
- 5 kilometers - 16 : 06 (Trier 2018)

Indoor

- 1500 metres – 4:19.39 (Portland 2016)
