= Adanech Anbesa =

Ethiopian sprinter

Personal information
- Nationality: Ethiopian
- Born: 23 January 1998 (age 28)

Sport
- Sport: Track and field
- Event: 1500 metres
Medal record
Women's athletics
Representing Ethiopia
African Championships
Bronze medal – third place	2016 Durban	1500 m

Adanech Anbesa Feyisa (born January 23, 1998) is an Ethiopian middle-distance runner who specializes in the 1500 meters.

== Biography and sprinting career ==
She won the bronze medal in the 1500 meters at the 2016 African Championships in Durban, breaking her personal best 4 min 5 s 22.

=== Personal bests ===
Event	Time (sec)	Venue	Date
1500 metres	4:05.22	Kings Park Stadium	24 JUN 2016
