= Lucía Rodríguez (athlete) =

Spanish middle-distance runner

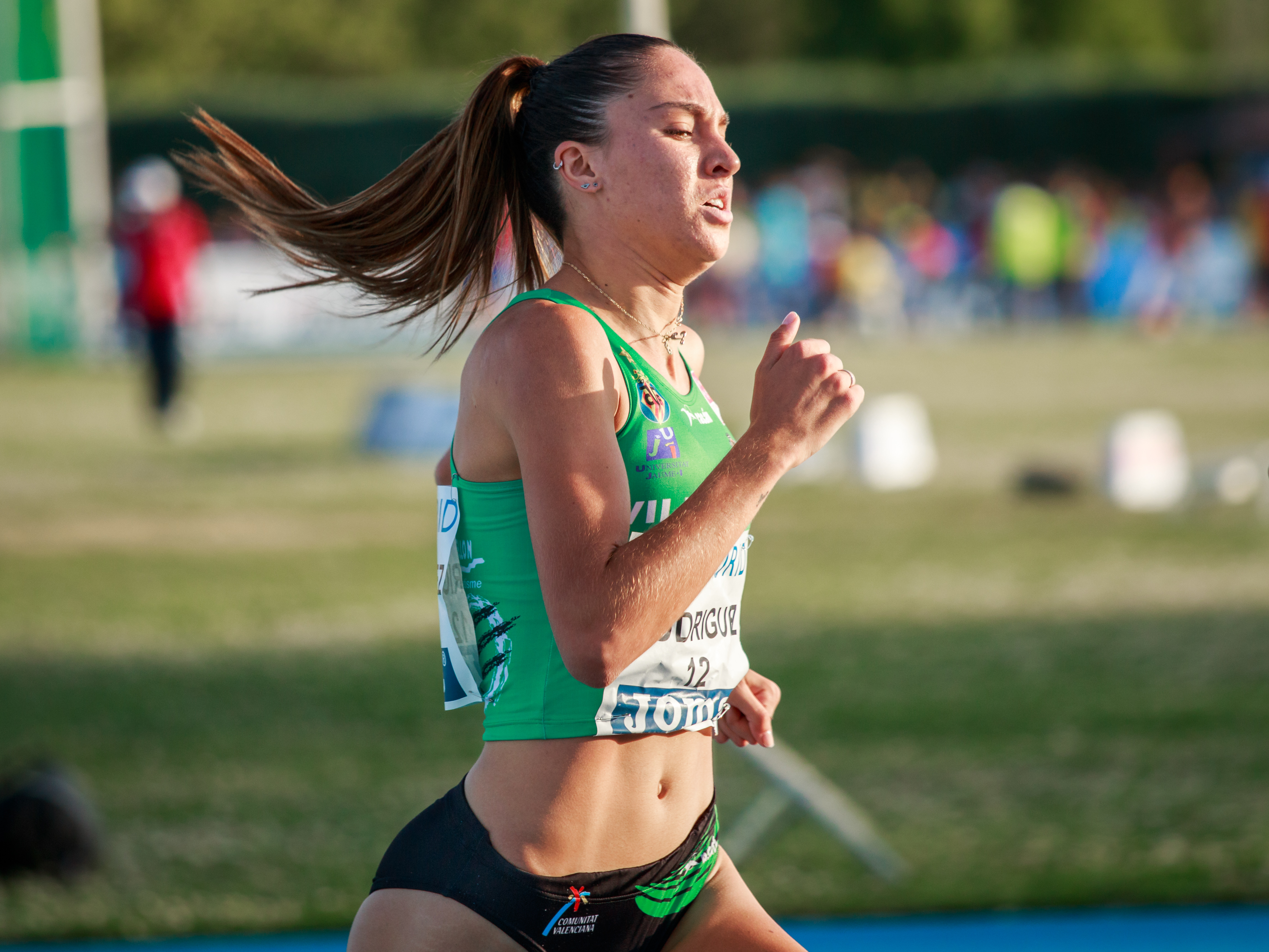
- Rodríguez in 2017

Personal information
- Full name: Lucía Rodríguez Montero
- Nationality: Spanish
- Born: 26 July 1998 (age 27) San Lorenzo de El Escorial
- Height: 175 cm (5 ft 9 in)
- Weight: 57 kg (126 lb)

Sport
- Sport: Athletics
- Event: 3000 metres

Lucía Rodríguez Montero (born 26 July 1998) is a Spanish athlete who competed in the women's 3000 metres event at the 2021 European Athletics Indoor Championships.

== Competition record ==
Year	Competition	Venue	Position	Event	Notes
Representing Spain
2015	World Youth Championships	Cali, Colombia	17th	3000 m	10:28.85
2016	World U20 Championships	Bydgoszcz, Poland	9th (h)	1500 m	4:24.04
2017	European U20 Championships	Grosseto, Italy	10th (h)	1500 m	4:34.12
2018	Mediterranean U23 Championships	Jesolo, Italy	2nd	1500 m	4:24.63
2019	European U23 Championships	Gävle, Sweden	8th	1500 m	4:26.26
2021	European Indoor Championships	Toruń, Poland	8th	3000 m	8:53.90
2021	Olympic Games	Tokyo, Japan	16th (h)	5000 m	15:26.19
2022	Ibero-American Championships	La Nucía, Spain	3rd	5000 m	16:10.08
