= 2017 European Athletics U20 Championships =

- Dates: 20–23 July
- Host city: Grosseto, Italy
- Venue: Stadio Olimpico Carlo Zecchini
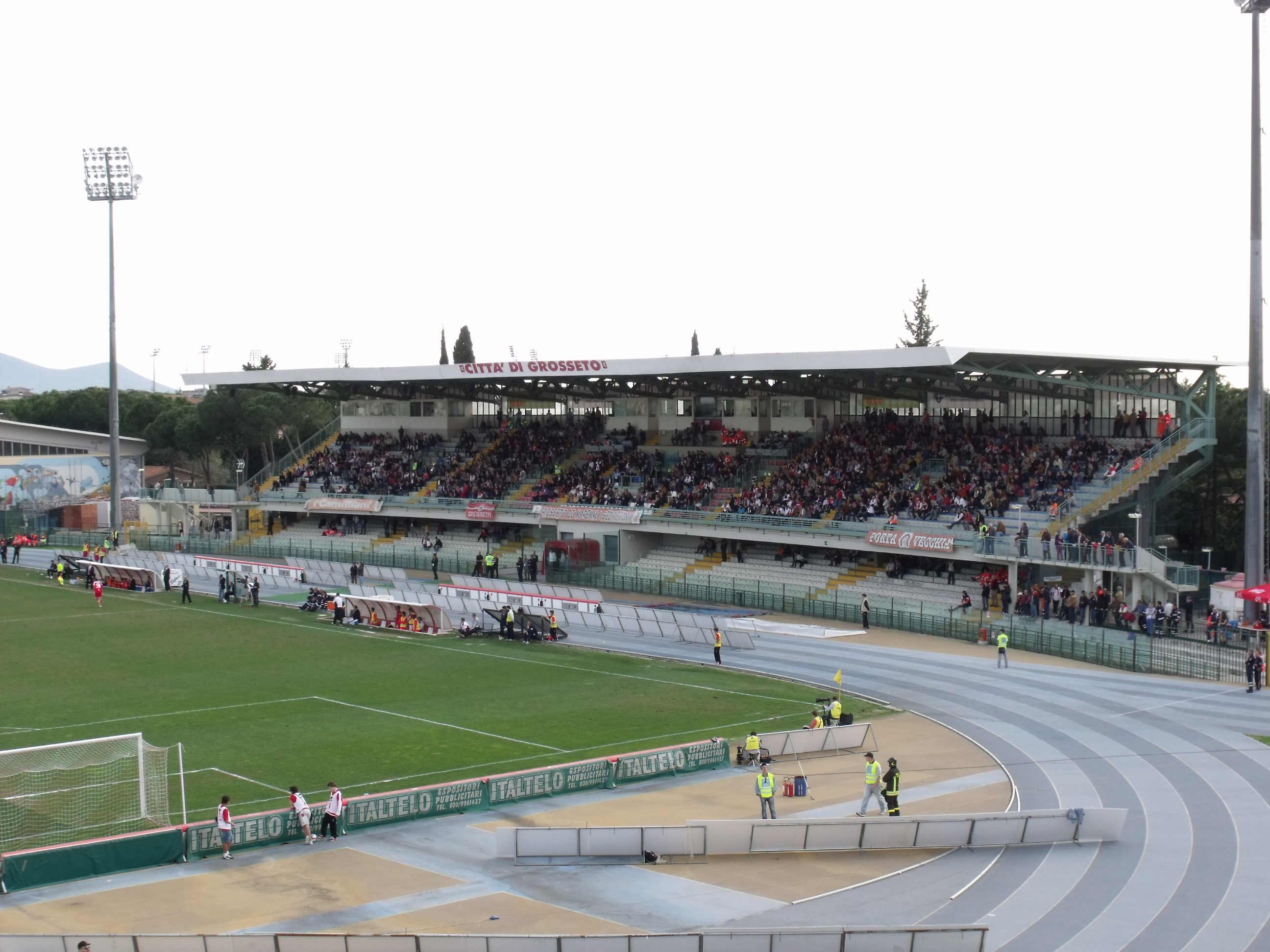
- Level: Under 20
- Events: 44

The 2017 European Athletics U20 Championships were the 24th edition of the biennial European U20 athletics championships. They were held in Grosseto, Italy from 20 July to 23 July.

== Medal summary ==
=== Men ===
==== Track ====
| Event | Gold | | Silver | | Bronze | |
|---|---|---|---|---|---|---|
| 100 metres | Filippo Tortu; Italy | 10.73 | Samuel Purola; Finland | 10.79 | Oliver Bromby; Great Britain | 10.88 |
| 200 metres | Toby Harries; Great Britain | 20.81; PB | Jona Efoloko; Great Britain | 20.92; PB | Samuel Purola; Finland | 21.00 |
| 400 metres | Vladimir Aceti; Italy | 45.92; EU20L | Tymoteusz Zimny; Poland | 46.04; PB | Jonathan Sacoor; Belgium | 46.23 |
| 800 metres | Marino Bloudek; Croatia | 1:48.70 | Markhim Lonsdale; Great Britain | 1:48.82 | John Fitzsimons; Ireland | 1:49.15 |
| 1500 metres | Jake Heyward; Great Britain | 3:56.73 | Dries De Smet; Belgium | 3:56.98 | Adrián Ben; Spain | 3:57.32 |
| 5000 metres | Jakob Ingebrigtsen; Norway | 14:41.67 | Tariku Novales; Spain | 14:44.66 | Dorin Andrei Rusu; Romania | 14:46.07 |
| 10000 metres | Dorin Andrei Rusu; Romania | 31:08.86 | Sergiy Polikarpenko; Italy | 31:10.85; PB | Sezgin Ataç; Turkey | 31:12.18 |
| 110 metres hurdles (99 cm) | Jason Joseph; Switzerland | 13.41 | Robert Sakala; Great Britain | 13.48; PB | Luis Salort; Spain | 13.48; NU20R |
| 400 metres hurdles | Wilfried Happio; France | 49.93; EU20L | Alessandro Sibilio; Italy | 50.34; PB | David José Pineda; Spain | 50.41; NU20R |
| 3000 metres steeplechase | Jakob Ingebrigtsen; Norway | 8:50.00 | Alexis Phelut; France | 8:53.73 | Louis Gilavert; France | 8:57.12 |
| 4 × 100 metres relay | Germany; Milo Skupin-Alfa; Thomas Barthel; Jonathan Petzke; Emanuel Stubican | 39.48; EU20L | Italy; Andrei Alexandru Zlatan; Nicholas Artuso; Mario Marchei; Filippo Tortu | 39.50; NU20R | Spain; Javier Troyano; Pol Retamal; Daniel Ambros; Sergio López | 39.59; NU20R |
| 4 × 400 metres relay | Italy; Vladimir Aceti; Edoardo Scotti; Klaudio Gjetja; Alessandro Sibilio | 3:08.68; WU20L | France; Fabrisio Saïdy; Téo Andant; Lidji Mbaye; Wilfried Happio | 3:09.04 | Poland; Mateusz Rzeźniczak; Antoni Walicki; Maciej Hołub; Tymoteusz Zimny | 3:09.32 |
| 10,000 m walk | Sergey Shirobokov; Individual Athletes | 43:21.29 | José Manuel Pérez; Spain | 44:17.23 | Eduard Zabuzhenko; Ukraine | 44:22.16 |

==== Field ====
| Event | Gold | | Silver | | Bronze | |
|---|---|---|---|---|---|---|
| High jump | Maksim Nedasekau; Belarus | 2.33; CR | Dmytro Nikitin; Ukraine | 2.28; PB | Tom Gale; Great Britain | 2.28; PB |
| Pole vault | Armand Duplantis; Sweden | 5.65; CR | Bo Kanda Lita Bähre; Germany | 5.45 | Romain Gavillon; France | 5.35; PB |
| Long jump | Miltiadis Tentoglou; Greece | 8.07 | Jakub Andrzejczak; Poland | 8.02; PB | Héctor Santos; Spain | 7.96; PB |
| Triple jump | Martin Lamou; France | 16.97; EU20L | Andrea Dallavalle; Italy | 16.87; NU20R | Melvin Raffin; France | 16.82 |
| Shot put (6 kg) | Marcus Thomsen; Norway | 21.36; WU20L | Szymon Mazur; Poland | 20.70 | Odisseas Mouzenidis; Greece | 20.67; NU20R |
| Discus throw (1.75 kg) | Oskar Stachnik; Poland | 62.01; SB | Hleb Zhuk; Belarus | 60.16 | George Evans; Great Britain | 59.05 |
| Hammer throw (6 kg) | Hlib Piskunov; Ukraine | 81.75; CR | Aliaksandr Shymanovich; Belarus | 77.74 | Dániel Rába; Hungary | 75.95 |
| Javelin throw | Cyprian Mrzygłód; Poland | 80.52; NU20R | Aliaksei Katkavets; Belarus | 76.91; PB | Lukas Moutarde; France | 74.22; PB |

==== Combined ====
| Event | Gold | | Silver | | Bronze | |
|---|---|---|---|---|---|---|
| Decathlon | Niklas Kaul; Germany | 8435; CR, WJR | Johannes Erm; Estonia | 8141; PB | Karel Tilga; Estonia | 8002; PB |

=== Women ===
==== Track ====
| Event | Gold | | Silver | | Bronze | |
|---|---|---|---|---|---|---|
| 100 metres | Gina Akpe-Moses; Ireland | 11.71 | Keshia Kwadwo; Germany | 11.75 | Ingvild Meinseth; Norway | 11.77 |
| 200 metres | Maya Bruney; Great Britain | 23.04; EU20L | Sophia Junk; Germany | 23.45 | Katrin Fehm; Germany | 23.49; PB |
| 400 metres | Anastasiya Bryzhina; Ukraine | 52.01 | Andrea Miklós; Romania | 52.31; PB | Hannah Williams; Great Britain | 52.55; PB |
| 800 metres | Khahisa Mhlanga; Great Britain | 2:06.96 | Ellie Baker; Great Britain | 2:07.01 | Gabriela Gajanová; Slovakia | 2:07.15 |
| 1500 metres | Jemma Reekie; Great Britain | 4:13.25 | Liliana Georgieva; Bulgaria | 4:16.73; PB | Harriet Knowles-Jones; Great Britain | 4:17.53 |
| 3000 metres | Delia Sclabas; Switzerland | 9:10.13 | Mathilde Sénéchal; France | 9:20.05; PB | Nadia Battocletti; Italy | 9:24.01; PB |
| 5000 metres | Jasmijn Lau; Netherlands | 16:38.85 | Miriam Dattke; Germany | 16:39.81 | Floor Doornwaard; Netherlands | 16:41.71 |
| 100 metres hurdles | Solène Ndama; France | 13.15; PB | Alicia Barrett; Great Britain | 13.28 | Klaudia Siciarz; Poland | 13.33 |
| 400 metres hurdles | Yasmin Giger; Switzerland | 55.90; EU20L | Agata Zupin; Slovenia | 55.96; NR | Viivi Lehikoinen; Finland | 56.49; NU20R |
| 3000 metres steeplechase | Lisa Oed; Germany | 10:00.79; PB | Tatsiana Shabanava; Belarus | 10:03.32; PB | Gülnaz Uskun; Turkey | 10:19.44 |
| 4 × 100 metres relay | Germany; Katrin Fehm; Keshia Kwadwo; Sophia Junk; Jennifer Montag | 43.44 | France; Éloïse de la Talle; Sarah Mingas; Estelle Raffai; Marine Mignon | 44.03 | Great Britain; Ebony Carr; Alisha Rees; Maya Bruney; Olivia Okoli | 44.17 |
| 4 × 400 metres relay | Ukraine; Ivanna Avramchuk; Dzhoys Koba; Iryna Marchak; Anastasiya Bryzhina | 3:32.82; WU20L | Germany; Vanessa Aniteye; Meike Gerlach; Alica Schmidt; Corinna Schwab | 3:33.08 | Great Britain; Mair Edwards; Maya Bruney; Ella Barrett; Hannah Williams | 3:33.68 |
| 10,000 m walk | Yana Smerdova; Individual Athletes | 47:19.69 | Teresa Zurek; Germany | 47:33.20 | Meryem Bekmez; Turkey | 48:33.88; NJR |

==== Field ====
| Event | Gold | | Silver | | Bronze | |
|---|---|---|---|---|---|---|
| High jump | Michaela Hrubá; Czech Republic | 1.93 | Karina Taranda; Belarus | 1.87 | Maja Nilsson; Sweden | 1.85 |
| Pole vault | Lisa Gunnarsson; Sweden | 4.40 | Molly Caudery; Great Britain | 4.35; PB | Wilma Murto; Finland | 4.15 |
| Long jump | Milica Gardašević; Serbia | 6.46 | Tabea Christ; Germany | 6.41; PB | Kaiza Karlén; Sweden | 6.32 |
| Triple jump | Violetta Skvartsova; Belarus | 14.21; WU20L | Ilionis Guillaume; France | 13.97 | Naomi Ogbeta; Great Britain | 13.68 |
| Shot put | Julia Ritter; Germany | 17.24; WU20L | Jorinde van Klinken; Netherlands | 16.89; PB | Anna Niedbała; Poland | 16.32; PB |
| Discus throw | Alexandra Emilianov; Moldova | 56.38 | Karolina Urban; Poland | 53.88; PB | Kristina Rakočević; Montenegro | 53.56 |
| Hammer throw | Katerina Skypalová; Czech Republic | 64.78 | Eva Mustafić; Croatia | 63.09; PB | Michaela Walsh; Ireland | 61.27 |
| Javelin throw | Nikol Tabačková; Czech Republic | 55.10 | Carolina Visca; Italy | 53.65 | Elina Kinnunen; Finland | 52.94 |

==== Combined ====
| Event | Gold | | Silver | | Bronze | |
|---|---|---|---|---|---|---|
| Heptathlon | Alina Shukh; Ukraine | 6381; WU20L | Géraldine Ruckstuhl; Switzerland | 6357; NR | Sarah Lagger; Austria | 6083; NU20R |

== Medal table ==
* Host nation (Italy)

| Rank | Nation | Gold | Silver | Bronze | Total |
|---|---|---|---|---|---|
| 1 | Germany (GER) | 5 | 7 | 1 | 13 |
| 2 | Great Britain (GBR) | 5 | 6 | 8 | 19 |
| 3 | Ukraine (UKR) | 4 | 1 | 1 | 6 |
| 4 | France (FRA) | 3 | 5 | 4 | 12 |
| 5 | Italy (ITA)* | 3 | 5 | 1 | 9 |
| 6 | Switzerland (SUI) | 3 | 1 | 0 | 4 |
| 7 | Norway (NOR) | 3 | 0 | 1 | 4 |
| 8 | Czech Republic (CZE) | 3 | 0 | 0 | 3 |
| 9 | Belarus (BLR) | 2 | 5 | 0 | 7 |
| 10 | Poland (POL) | 2 | 4 | 3 | 9 |
| 11 | Sweden (SWE) | 2 | 0 | 2 | 4 |
| – | Individual Athletes (EAA) | 2 | 0 | 0 | 2 |
| 12 | Netherlands (NED) | 1 | 1 | 1 | 3 |
| 12 | Romania (ROU) | 1 | 1 | 1 | 3 |
| 14 | Croatia (CRO) | 1 | 1 | 0 | 2 |
| 15 | Ireland (IRL) | 1 | 0 | 2 | 3 |
| 16 | Greece (GRE) | 1 | 0 | 1 | 2 |
| 17 | Moldova (MDA) | 1 | 0 | 0 | 1 |
| 17 | Serbia (SRB) | 1 | 0 | 0 | 1 |
| 19 | Spain (ESP) | 0 | 2 | 5 | 7 |
| 20 | Finland (FIN) | 0 | 1 | 4 | 5 |
| 21 | Belgium (BEL) | 0 | 1 | 1 | 2 |
| 21 | Estonia (EST) | 0 | 1 | 1 | 2 |
| 23 | Bulgaria (BUL) | 0 | 1 | 0 | 1 |
| 23 | Slovenia (SLO) | 0 | 1 | 0 | 1 |
| 25 | Turkey (TUR) | 0 | 0 | 3 | 3 |
| 26 | Austria (AUT) | 0 | 0 | 1 | 1 |
| 26 | Hungary (HUN) | 0 | 0 | 1 | 1 |
| 26 | Montenegro (MNE) | 0 | 0 | 1 | 1 |
| 26 | Slovakia (SVK) | 0 | 0 | 1 | 1 |
| Totals (29 entries) | | 44 | 44 | 44 | 132 |

== Participation ==
According to an unofficial count, 1,227 athletes from 47 countries participated in the event.

- Andorra (1)
- Armenia (1)
- Austria (18)
- Azerbaijan (1)
- Belarus (26)
- Belgium (33)
- Bosnia and Herzegovina (3)
- Bulgaria (14)
- Croatia (22)
- Cyprus (6)
- Czech Republic (47)
- Denmark (9)
- Estonia (20)
- Finland (46)
- France (68)
- Georgia (3)
- Germany (86)
- Gibraltar (2)
- Great Britain (59)
- Greece (35)
- Hungary (42)
- Iceland (2)
- Individual Athletes (4)
- Ireland (42)
- Israel (12)
- Italy (104) (host)
- Latvia (21)
- Lithuania (16)
- Luxembourg (4)
- Macedonia (2)
- Malta (1)
- Moldova (6)
- Monaco (1)
- Montenegro (1)
- Netherlands (29)
- Norway (40)
- Poland (65)
- Portugal (33)
- Romania (33)
- San Marino (2)
- Serbia (13)
- Slovakia (15)
- Slovenia (16)
- Spain (54)
- Sweden (39)
- Switzerland (38)
- Turkey (62)
- Ukraine (30)

== Belarusian National Anthem Error ==
During the medal ceremony for the women’s triple jump, the wrong national anthem was mistakenly played instead of Belarus’s to celebrate Viyaleta Skvartsova’s victory. In response, the Belarusian athlete left the podium before the end of the ceremony. The scene was filmed and published on the [NEXTA] YouTube channel, confirming the incident. The organizers later apologized and offered to hold a new ceremony.
