= Kosovo at the World Athletics Championships =

- WA code: KOS
- National federation: Kosovo Athletic Federation
- Website: www.fakosova.org
- Medals: Gold 0 Silver 0 Bronze 0 Total 0

World Athletics Championships appearances (overview)
- 2015; 2017; 2019; 2022; 2023; 2025

Other related appearances
- Yugoslavia (1983–1991); Serbia and Montenegro (1998–2005); Serbia (2007–2013)

Kosovo has competed in the World Athletics Championships four times with their first appearance being in 2015 at Beijing, China with Musa Hajdari competing in the men's 800 m. As of 2019, the country has not recorded any medals. Kosovo best performance was in 2015 when Musa Hajdari finished 21st overall in the rankings of the men's 800 metres.

== Medal count ==
Games	Athletes	Gold	Silver	Bronze	Total
(China) 2015 Beijing (details)	1	0	0	0	0
(United Kingdom) 2017 London (details)	1	0	0	0	0
(Qatar) 2019 Doha (details)	1	0	0	0	0
(United States) 2022 Eugene (details)	1	0	0	0	0
(Hungary) 2023 Budapest (details	1	0	0	0	0
(Japan) 2025 Tokyo (details)	1	0	0		0
(China) 2027 Beijing	To be determined				
(Kenya) 2029 Nairobi	To be determined				
(Germany) 2031 Munich	To be determined				
Total		0	0	0	0

== Entrants ==
Athlete	Event	Championships	Best Performance
Gresa Bakraçi	Woman's 1500 metres	2022	41st (2022)
Musa Hajdari	Men's 800 metres	2015, 2019	21st (2015)
Astrit Kryeziu	Men's 800 metres	2017	39th (2017)

== See also ==
- Kosovo at the European Athletics Championships
