= Kosovo at the 2016 European Athletics Championships =

- WA code: KOS
- National federation: FAK
- Website: fakosova.org

in Amsterdam
- Competitors: 2 (1 man and 1 woman) in 2 events
- Medals: Gold 0 Silver 0 Bronze 0 Total 0

European Athletics Championships appearances (overview)
- 2016; 2018; 2022; 2024

Kosovo competed at the 2016 European Athletics Championships in Amsterdam, Netherlands, between 6 and 10 July 2016.

== Results ==
Men

Track & road events

Athlete	Event	Heat		Semifinal		Final	
Athlete	Event	Result	Rank	Result	Rank	Result	Rank
Musa Hajdari	800 m	1:48.97	11	did not advance			

Women

Track & road events

Athlete	Event	Heat		Semifinal		Final	
Athlete	Event	Result	Rank	Result	Rank	Result	Rank
Vijona Kryeziu	400 m	56.04	19	did not advance			
