= La Cadena =

Mountain in Spain

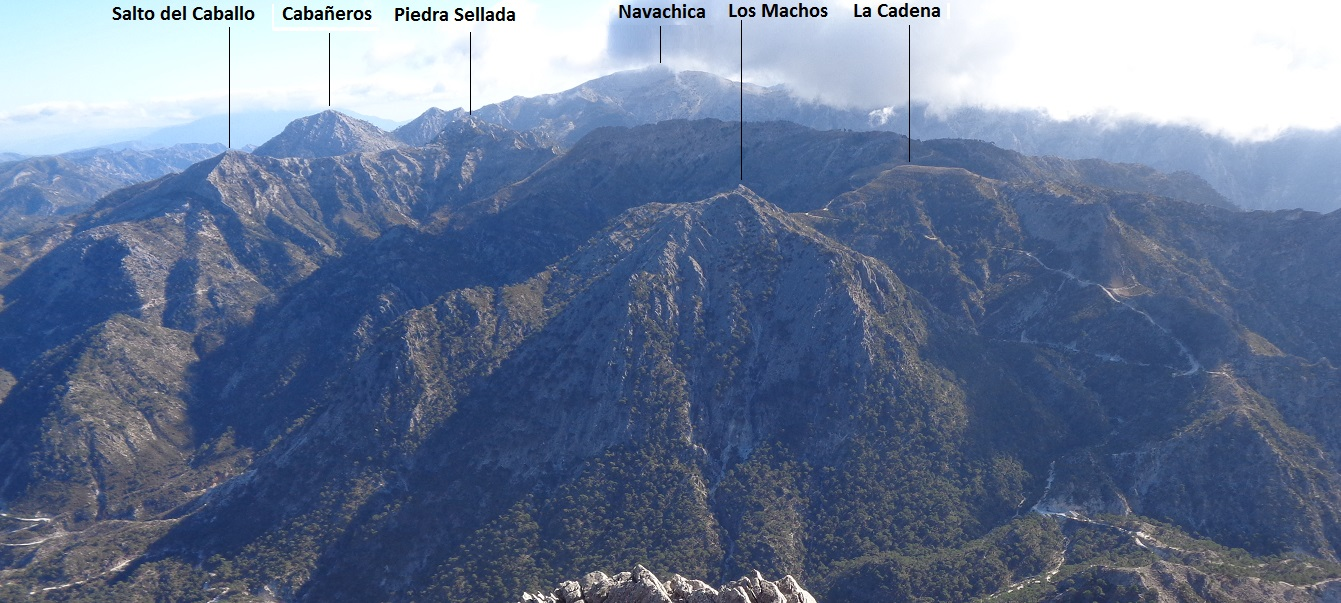
- Panorama of the Sierra de Almijara from the peak of Cerro del Lucero.

Highest point
- Elevation: 1,645 m (5,397 ft)
- Coordinates: 36.853917°N 3.856445°W

Geography
- Location within Spain
- Country: Spain
- Autonomous community: Andalusia
- Province: Málaga
- Parent range: Sierra Almijara

Geology
- Mountain type: Sedimentary
- Rock type: Calcareous formations

La Cadena is a mountain in the Frigiliana municipality of the Province of Málaga in southern Spain, in the Sierra de Almijara.

== Location ==
La Cadena is one of the main peaks of the Sierras of Tejeda, Almijara and Alhama Natural Park. The peak of La Cadena has an elevation of 1,645 metres (5,397 ft). To reach the peak a climber must walk along a very narrow ridge with sections no more than 30 centimetres (12 in) wide and sections that are very broken. The rocks are firm, but may be slippery and dangerous if they are wet or icy. At the summit there is a hunting reserve sign and a small iron cross, both well-embedded in the rock.

== Geology ==
The Sierra de Almijara is a rough mass of marble mountains with sharp ridges that stretches east from the Puerto de Cómpeta. The mountains contain narrow ridges separated by deep valleys cut by the streams and rivers, resulting in many small sub-basins. All of the park has the calcareous formations of the Subbética region, with marbles, shales, phyllites, etc. The area is rich in quartzite and gneiss over 300 million years old. The Sierra de Almijara holds one of the Spain's main sources of dolomitic marble. The marble gives white and gray tones to the ridges and ravines.

== Sources ==
- Arenas, Antonio, "Sierras de Alhama, Tejeda and Almijara Natural Park", Waste Magazine (in Spanish)
- Carreira, Jose A.; Lajtha, Kate; Niell, F. Xavier (October 1997), "Phosphorus Transformations along a Soil/Vegetation Series of Fire-Prone, Dolomitic, Semi-Arid Shrublands of Southern Spain", Biogeochemistry, 39 (1), Springer: 87–120, doi:10.1023/A:1005871404474, JSTOR 1469074
- Mariló V. Oyonarte (30 November 2001), "El sendero imaginario; una ruta diferente en el corazón de la Almijara", Alhama.com (in Spanish)
- Parque natural Sierras de Tejeda, Almijara y Alhama (in Spanish), Junta de Andalucía
- "Puerto Blanquillo - Raspón de Los Moriscos", Rural Sierra y Sol (in Spanish)
- "Sierras de Tejeda, Almijara y Alhama", Hiking Iberia
- Williams, Jo, "Sierras of Tejeda, Almijara and Almara Natural Park", Andalucia.com
