= Sierra de Almijara =

Mountain range in Spain

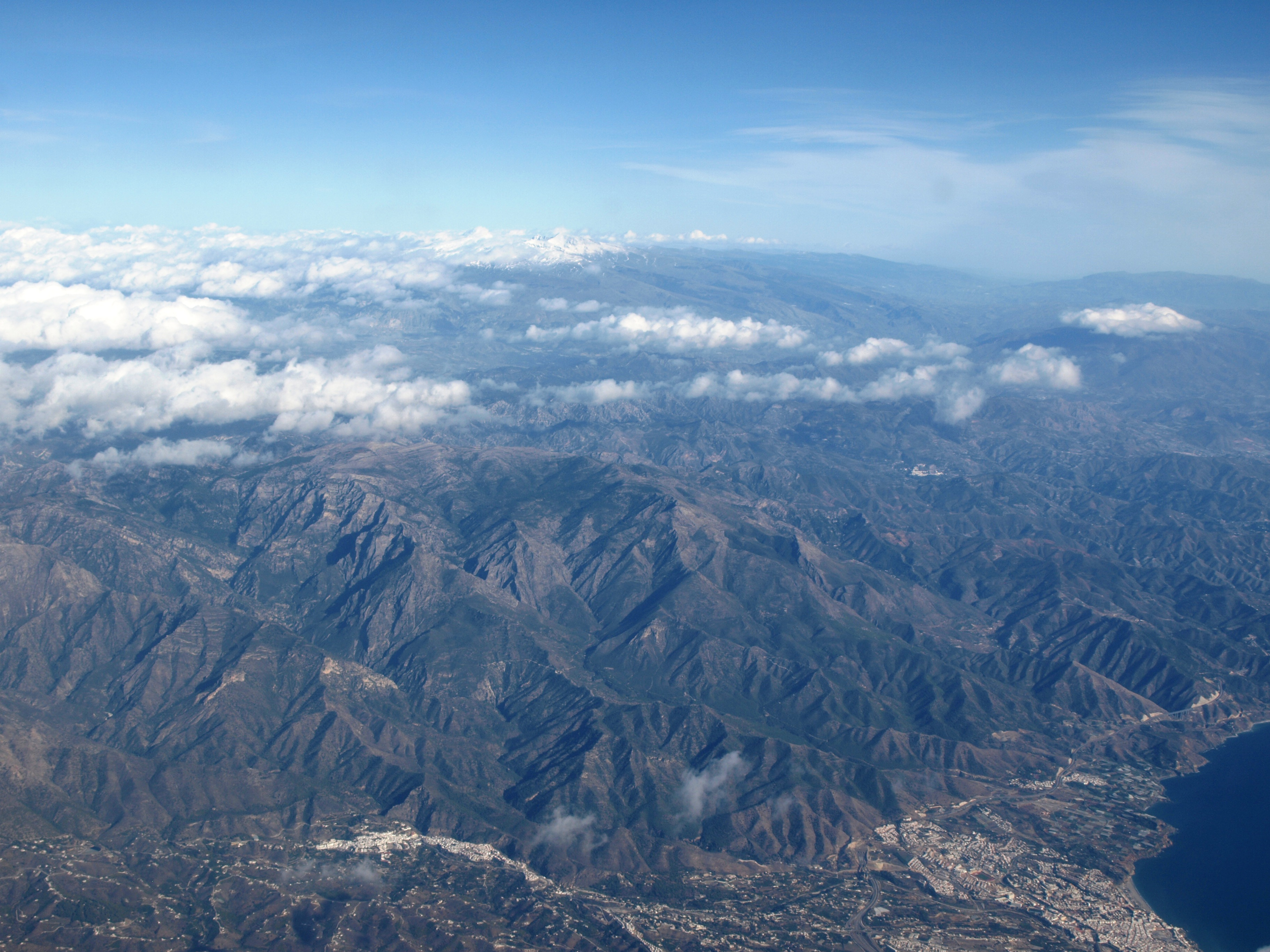
- Sierra de Almijara with Sierra Nevada in the background

Highest point
- Peak: Navachica
- Elevation: 1,831 m (6,007 ft)
- Coordinates: 36.841917°N 3.81530°W

Geography
- Location within Spain
- Country: Spain
- Autonomous community: Andalusia
- Province: Málaga and Granada
- Parent range: Penibaetic System

Geology
- Mountain type: Mountain range
- Rock type: Calcareous formations

The Sierra de Almijara is a mountain range in the provinces of Granada and Málaga in southern Spain. The rocks are mainly marble, giving a white or gray color to the narrow ridges and deep ravines. The range is mostly protected by the Sierras of Tejeda, Almijara and Alhama Natural Park.

== Location ==
The Sierras of Tejeda and Almijara form a single range about 40 kilometres (25 mi) west of the Sierra Nevada. The mountains form a barrier between the coast and the interior. They are part of the Penibaetic System. The Sierras of Tejeda, Almijara and Alhama Natural Park covers 40,657 hectares (100,470 acres). The park contains the Sierra de Tejeda and Sierra de Almijara mountains in the Axarquía comarca of the eastern province of Málaga and the Alhama comarca on the southwest of the province of Granada.

== Topography ==
The Sierra de Almijara is a rough mass of marble mountains with sharp ridges that stretches east from the Puerto de Cómpeta. The mountains contain narrow ridges separated by deep valleys cut by the streams and rivers, resulting in many small sub-basins. The most distinct peak is the Cerro del Lucero. Navachica is the highest peak in the Sierra Almijara. The peak has an elevation of 1,831 metres (6,007 ft) and topographic prominence of 597 metres (1,959 ft). The Sierra Almijara and Sierra Tejeda form the southern margin of the western part of the Granada basin, and contain tributaries of the Cacín River. Pliocene sediments exposed in the northwest of the Granada basin were washed down by the Cacín from the Alpujarride reliefs of the Almijara/Tejeda.

== Climate ==
The mountains have highest rainfall in December, January and March, and lowest in July. According to the Resource Management Plan (Decree 145/199 of the Junta de Andalucía) annual rainfall ranges from 400 millimetres (16 in) in Cacín, Almuñécar and Nerja to 1,000 millimetres (39 in) in Arenas del Rey. Temperatures in the areas with marine influence, including Nerja, Almuñecar and Frigiliana range from 4 to 30 °C (39 to 86 °F). Higher in the mountains the temperatures range from 0 to 22 °C (32 to 72 °F). Further inland in the Alhama region they range from −3.1 to 40 °C (26.4 to 104.0 °F) in summer.

At low and medium elevations to climate is thermic semi-arid mediterranean. The mean air temperature is 17–19 °C (63–66 °F) and mean annual precipitation is 350–600 millimetres (14–24 in). Most of the rain is torrential and falls between November and March.

== Geology ==
All of the park has the calcareous formations of the Subbética region, with marbles, shales, phyllites, etc. The area is rich in quartzite and gneiss over 300 million years old. The Sierra de Almijara holds one of Spain's main sources of dolomitic marble. The marble gives white and gray tones to the ridges and ravines. The limestone has been eaten out by water to create a maze of fissures, depressions and caves, including the deep canyon of the Chíllar River and the Caves of Nerja. The Caves of Nerja (Cueva de Nerja), with an entrance just south of the park, is a National Monument.

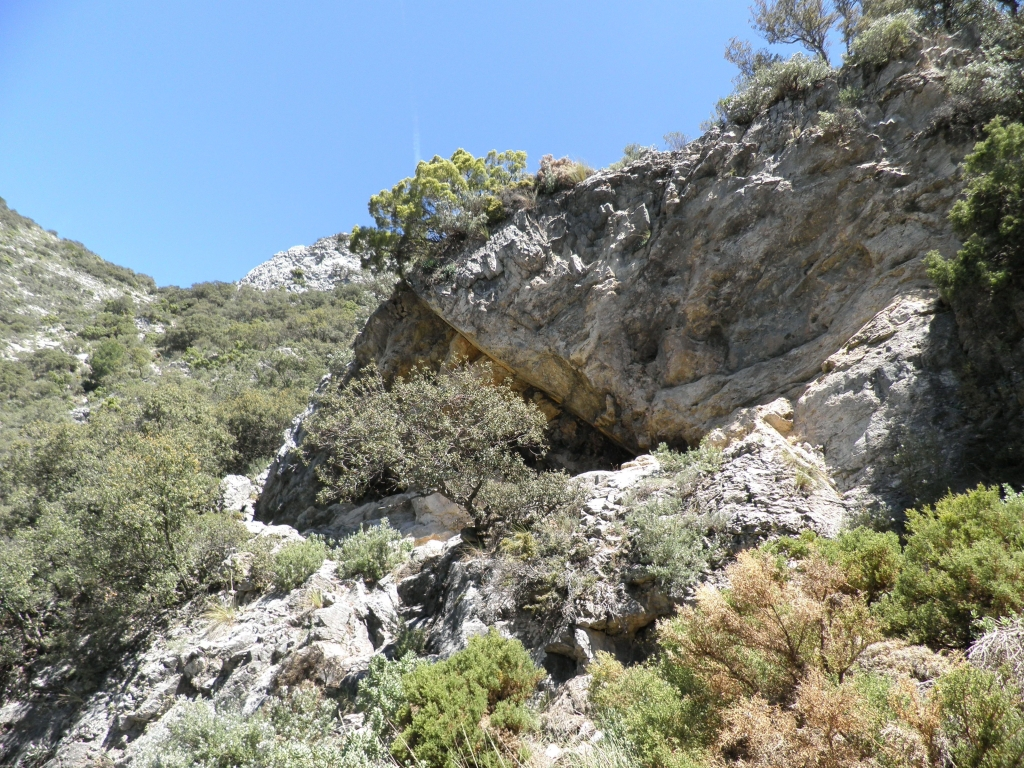
Mountainside

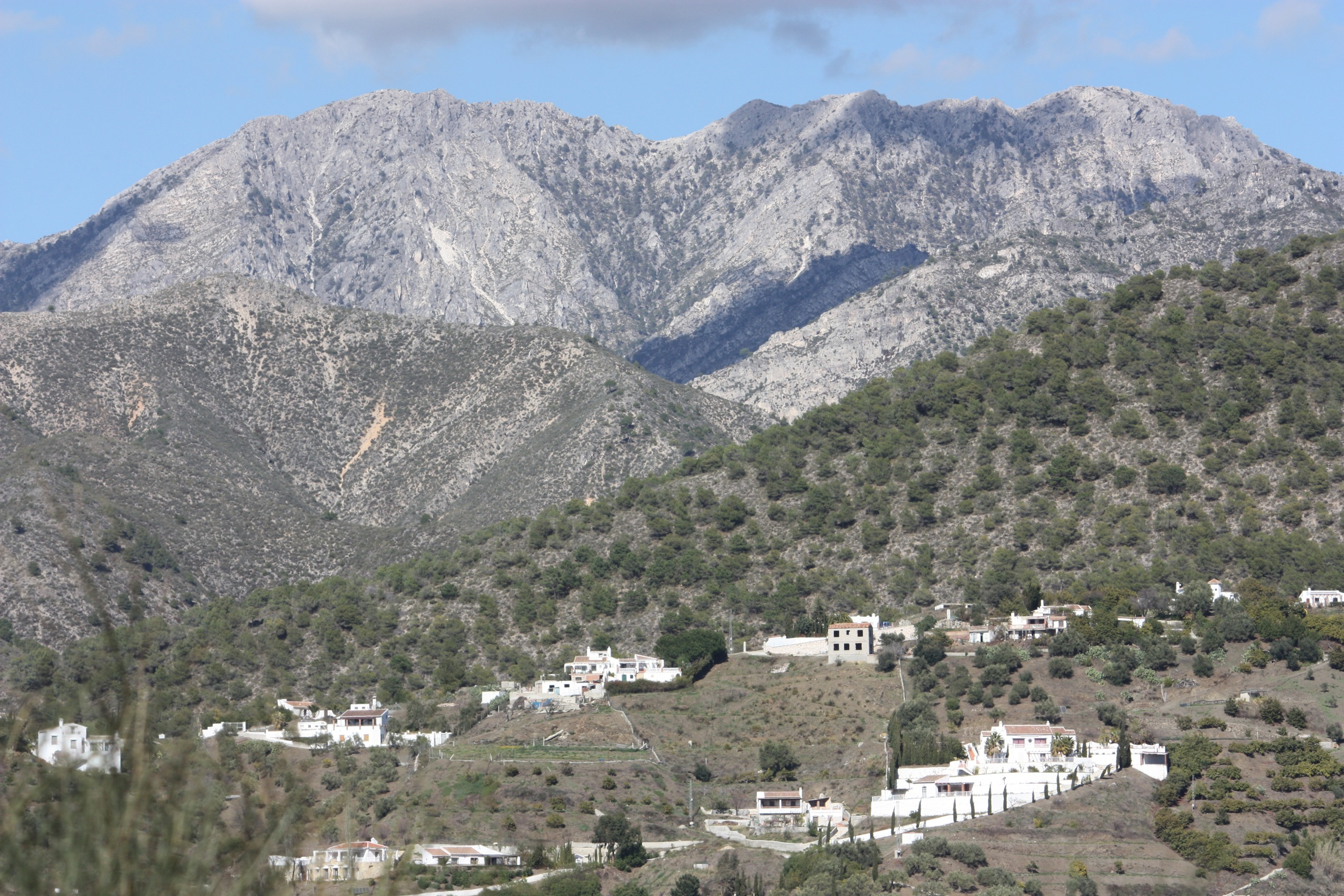
Torrox, Sierra Almijara in background

The parent rock consists of dolomite marble formed in the Triassic. It is intensively folded and cut by transversal faults. Weathering in some areas has resulted in sands of almost pure dolomite crystals with very little clay, and in stony ground of partially altered marbles. Sandy regosols develop with high levels of carbonates and magnesium and low levels of plant nutrients. Erosion due to the steep slopes, lack of vegetation and fires prevent the soil from developing.

== Peaks ==
From west to east, the named peaks are

Name	Altitude	Coords
Santiago	1,645 metres (5,397 ft)	
Malas Camas	1,791 metres (5,876 ft)	
Abucaz	1,726 metres (5,663 ft)	
Rajas Negras	1,641 metres (5,384 ft)	
Frailes	1,669 metres (5,476 ft)	
Arca Catete	1,664 metres (5,459 ft)	
Mota	1,649 metres (5,410 ft)	
Venta Panaderos	1,687 metres (5,535 ft)	
Lucero or Moriscos	1,774 metres (5,820 ft)	36.867537°N 3.890464°W
Los Machos	1,589 metres (5,213 ft)	36.860346°N 3.871972°W
La Cadena	1,645 metres (5,397 ft)	36.853917°N 3.856445°W
Salto del Caballo	1,642 metres (5,387 ft)	
Piedra Sellada	1,679 metres (5,509 ft)	
Cabañeros	1,712 metres (5,617 ft)	36.859138°N 3.814517°W
Navachica	1,831 metres (6,007 ft)	36.841917°N 3.815306°W

== Sources ==
- Arenas, Antonio, "Sierras de Alhama, Tejeda and Almijara Natural Park", Waste Magazine (in Spanish)
- Carreira, Jose A.; Lajtha, Kate; Niell, F. Xavier (October 1997), "Phosphorus Transformations along a Soil/Vegetation Series of Fire-Prone, Dolomitic, Semi-Arid Shrublands of Southern Spain", Biogeochemistry, 39 (1), Springer: 87–120, doi:10.1023/A:1005871404474, JSTOR 1469074, S2CID 55579939
- Decreto 2/2016, de 12 de enero, por el que se declara la Zona Especial de Conservación Sierras de Tejeda, Almijara y Alhama (Es6170007) y se aprueban el plan de ordenación de los recursos naturales y el plan rector de uso y gestión del Parque Natural Sierras de Tejeda, Almijara y Alhama (PDF) (in Spanish), Consejería de Medio Ambiente y Ordenación del Territorio
- "Etapa 8, Canillas de Aceituno - Periana", Caminando por la Historia de la provincia • Gran Senda de Málaga (in Spanish), Diputación de Málaga
- García Alix, Antonio; Minwer Barakat, Raef; Martín, José M.; Martín Suárez, Elvira; Freudenthal, Matthijs (July–August 2009), "Dating The Change From Endorheic To Exorheic Conditions In The Drainage System Of The Granada Basin (Southern Spain)", PALAIOS, 24 (7/8), SEPM Society for Sedimentary Geology: 544–549, Bibcode:2009Palai..24..544G, doi:10.2110/palo.2009.p09-015r, JSTOR 40606444, S2CID 128776614
- Gutiérrez Larena, Belén; Fuertes Aguilar, Javier; Nieto Feliner, Gonzalo (September 2006), "Dispersal across Southern Iberian Refugia? Integrating RAPDs, Sequence Data and Morphometrics in Armeria (Plumbaginaceae)", Folia Geobotanica, 41 (3), Springer: 305–322, doi:10.1007/BF02904944, hdl:10261/29779, JSTOR 25134150, S2CID 41250589
- Parque natural Sierras de Tejeda, Almijara y Alhama (in Spanish), Junta de Andalucía
- "Pico de Navachica, Spain", Peakbagger.com
- "Puerto Blanquillo - Raspón de Los Moriscos", Rural Sierra y Sol (in Spanish)
- Sierras de Tejeda, Almijara y Alhama, Empresa Pública para la Gestión del Turismo y del Deporte de Andalucía, S. A., 2011
- Williams, Jo (21 April 2014), "Sierras of Tejeda, Almijara and Almara Natural Park", Andalucia.com
- Yus Ramos, Rafael (2005), Axarquia, Medio Natural (PDF) (in Spanish), Centro de Desarrollo Rural de la Axarquía, ISBN 84-689-5147-1, archived from the original (PDF) on 2016-03-04
