= 2023 European Athletics Indoor Championships – Women's 3000 metres =

Women's 3000 metres at the 2023 European Athletics Indoor Championships
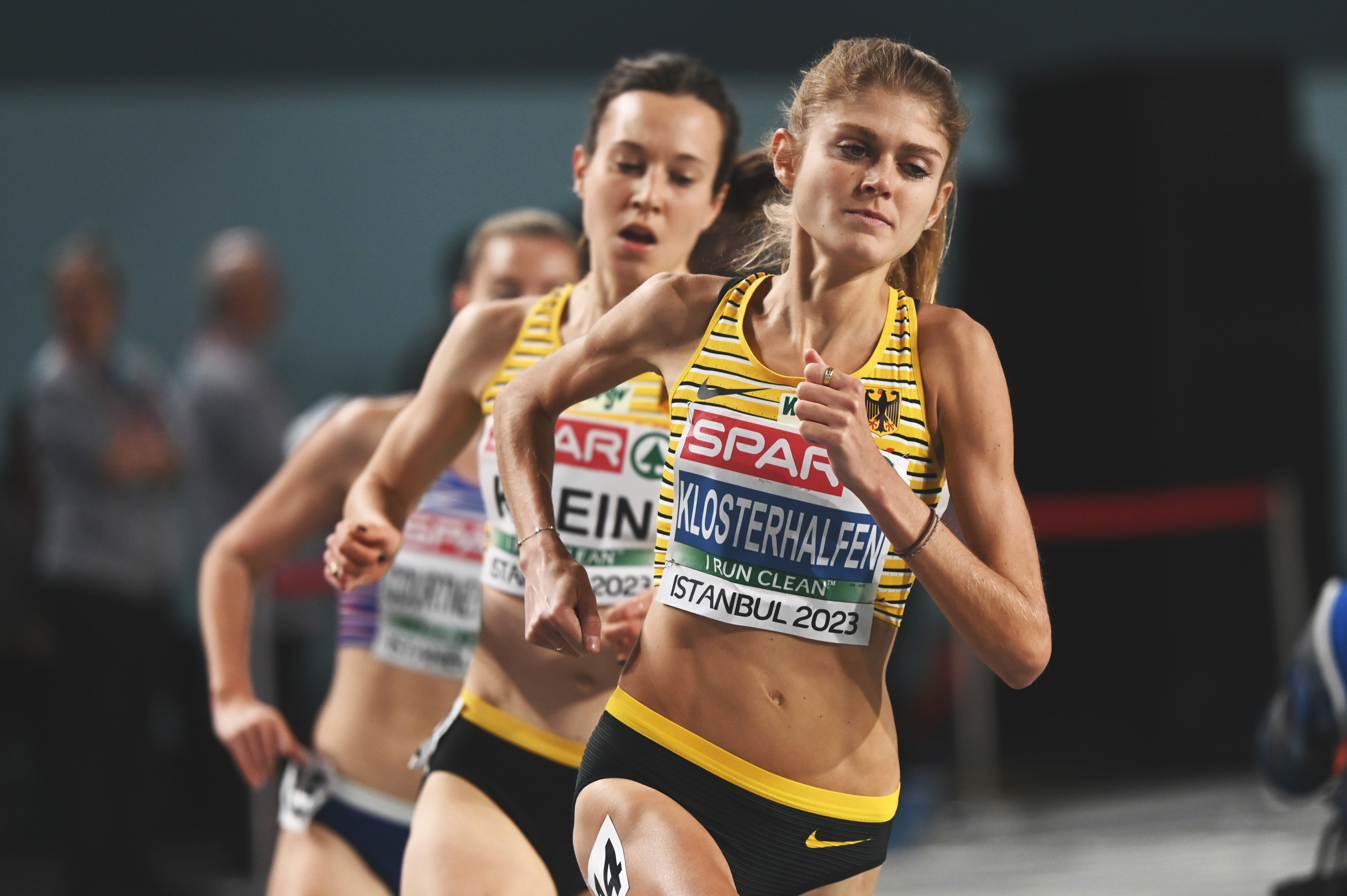
- The final underway.
- Venue: Ataköy Athletics Arena
- Location: Istanbul, Turkey
- Dates: 2 March 2023 (round 1); 3 March 2023 (final)
- Competitors: 23 from 17 nations
- Winning time: 8:35.87 PB

Medalists
gold medal	Hanna Klein	Germany
silver medal	Konstanze Klosterhalfen	Germany
bronze medal	Melissa Courtney-Bryant	Great Britain

The Women's 3000 metres event at the 2023 European Athletics Indoor Championships was held on 2 March at 20:30 (heats), and on 3 March at 20:18 (final) local time.

== Records ==
Standing records prior to the 2023 European Athletics Indoor Championships
World record	Genzebe Dibaba (ETH)	8:16.60	Stockholm, Sweden	6 February 2014
European record	Laura Muir (GBR)	8:26.41	Karlsruhe, Germany	4 February 2017
Championship record	Laura Muir (GBR)	8:30.61	Glasgow, United Kingdom	1 March 2019
World Leading	Gudaf Tsegay (ETH)	8:16.69	Birmingham, Great Britain	25 February 2023
European Leading	Konstanze Klosterhalfen (GER)	8:34.89	Dortmund, Germany	18 February 2023

== Results ==
=== Heats ===
Qualification: First 6 in each heat (Q) and the next 3 fastest (q) advance to the Final.

Rank	Heat	Athlete	Nationality	Time	Note
1	1	Konstanze Klosterhalfen	Germany	8:53.50	Q
2	1	Camilla Richardsson	Finland	8:53.60	Q, NR
3	1	Hannah Nuttall	Great Britain	8:53.72	Q
4	1	Ludovica Cavalli	Italy	8:54.40	Q
5	1	Maruša Mišmaš-Zrimšek	Slovenia	8:56.71	Q
6	1	Marta Pérez	Spain	8:56.82	Q
7	2	Hanna Klein	Germany	8:59.28	Q
8	2	Nadia Battocletti	Italy	8:59.65	Q
9	2	Maureen Koster	Netherlands	9:00.33	Q
10	2	Melissa Courtney-Bryant	Great Britain	9:00.40	Q
11	2	Agate Caune	Latvia	9:01.33	Q
12	2	Yasemin Can	Turkey	9:01.34	Q, SB
13	1	Emine Hatun Mechaal	Turkey	9:03.03	q, SB
14	2	Marta García	Spain	9:06.14	q
15	1	Mariana Machado	Portugal	9:07.78	q
16	2	Leila Hadji	France	9:12.53	
17	1	Nanna Bové	Denmark	9:13.65	
18	2	Micol Majori	Italy	9:16.40	SB
19	2	Lilla Böhm	Hungary	9:18.93	PB
20	2	Anastasia Marinakou	Greece	9:22.35	
21	1	Ine Bakken	Norway	9:25.12	PB
22	2	Gresa Bakraçi	Kosovo	9:36.96	NR
	1	Sara Christiansson	Sweden	DNF	

=== Final ===
Rank	Athlete	Nationality	Time	Note
1st place, gold medalist(s)	Hanna Klein	Germany	8:35.87	PB
2nd place, silver medalist(s)	Konstanze Klosterhalfen	Germany	8:36.50	
3rd place, bronze medalist(s)	Melissa Courtney-Bryant	Great Britain	8:41.19	
4	Nadia Battocletti	Italy	8:44.96	SB
5	Hannah Nuttall	Great Britain	8:46.30	PB
6	Maureen Koster	Netherlands	8:47.17	SB
7	Marta Pérez	Spain	8:49.19	
8	Maruša Mišmaš-Zrimšek	Slovenia	8:49.98	
9	Ludovica Cavalli	Italy	8:53.97	
10	Marta García	Spain	8:54.92	
11	Agate Caune	Latvia	8:56.88	EU20L
12	Camilla Richardsson	Finland	8:57.13	
13	Emine Hatun Mechaal	Turkey	9:22.12	
	Yasemin Can	Turkey	DNF	
	Mariana Machado	Portugal	DNF	
