= List of Kosovan records in athletics =

The following are the national records in athletics in Kosovo maintained by the Kosovo Athletic Federation.

== Outdoor ==
Key to tables: Awaiting ratification Record not kept by Kosovo Athletic Federation

# = not ratified by federation and/or IAAF

=== Men ===
Event	Record	Athlete	Date	Meet	Place	Ref.
100 m	10.78 (+0.7 m/s)	Edis Ahmeti	8 June 2017		Elbasan, Albania	
200 m	21.53 (+1.5 m/s)	Lirim Emerllahu	2 April 2022		San Antonio, United States	
300 m	34.51	Astrit Kryeziu	2 June 2012		Istanbul, Turkey	
400 m	48.12	Astrit Kryeziu	1 July 2017		Stara Zagora, Bulgaria	
400 m	47.83 #	Astrit Kryeziu	19 July 2014		Skopje, Macedonia	
600 m	1:18.50	Astrit Kryeziu	2 July 2011		Mitrovica, Kosovo	
800 m	1:47.70	Musa Hajdari	22 August 2015	World Championships	Beijing, China	
800 m	1:47.40 #	Musa Hajdari	31 August 2014		Mitrovica, Kosovo	
1000 m	2:23.08 #	Musa Hajdari	23 June 2014		Mitrovica, Kosovo	
1500 m	3:41.6 h #	Ismet Abazi	11 June 1975		Belgrade, Yugoslavia	
1500 m	3:46.77 #	Musa Hajdari	19 July 2014		Skopje, Macedonia	
Mile	4:16.68	Musa Hajdari	27 September 2014		Mitrovica, Kosovo	
3000 m	8:26.1 h (Note: indoor mark ratified as absolute record)	Albion Ymer	27 January 2022		Elbasan, Albania	
5000 m	14:18.0 h #	Ismet Rushiti	8 April 1982		Vukovar, Yugoslavia	
5000 m	15:19.80 #	Rrahim Mani	4 July 2006		Tirana, Albania	
10,000 m	30:47.0 h #	Nexhmidin Ibishi	29 May 1971		Belgrade, Yugoslavia	
10,000 m	32:41.30 #	Lulzim Kallaba	14 June 2003		Mitrovica, Serbia and Montenegro	
Half marathon	1:08:44	Albion Ymeri	17 October 2021		Tirana, Albania	
Marathon	2:29:36 #	Rexhep Ajvazaj	9 February 1997		Las Vegas, United States	
110 m hurdles	15.0 h #	Agron Mucaku	5 July 1986		Mitrovica, Yugoslavia	
400 m hurdles	58.0 h #	Agron Mucaku	6 July 1986		Mitrovica, Yugoslavia	
3000 m steeplechase	9:12.8 h #	Mustafe Shabani	1970			
3000 m steeplechase	9:52.00 #	Meriton Hasanaj	8 June 2012		Tirana, Albania	
High jump	1.99 m #	Abaz Emini	1989		Mitrovica, Yugoslavia	
High jump	2.00 m	Erydit Rysha	21 May 2021		Elbasan, Albania	
Pole vault	3.10 m	Erdonit Raçaj	23 September 2018		Bassano del Grappa, Italy	
Long jump	7.04 m #	Shefqet Hasani	1981		Belgrade, Yugoslavia	
Long jump	6.89 m #	Bujar Tërshani	11 June 2005		Mitrovica, Serbia and Montenegro	
Triple jump	14.04 m	Erudit Rysha	19 July 2020		Mitrovica, Kosovo	
Shot put	18.72 m	Muhamet Ramadani	1 May 2022		Bar, Montenegro	
Discus throw	50.33 m	Alaudin Suma	8 May 2022		Mitrovica, Kosovo	
Hammer throw						
Javelin throw	56.20	Edževit Mahmutović	10 July 2005		Mitrovica, Serbia and Montenegro	
Decathlon						
Decathlon	100m (wind) / Long jump (wind) / Shot put / High jump / 400m / 110m H (wind) / Discus / Pole vault / Javelin / 1500m					
20 km walk (road)						
50 km walk (road)						
4 × 100 m relay	43.27	Kosovo; Bardh Telaku; Enis Bytyqi; Altin Ukaj; Granit Ahmeti	24 June 2025	European Team Championships	Maribor, Slovenia	
4 × 400 m relay	3:16.87	Kosovo; Musa Hajdari; Valentin Sadiku; Granit Kryeziu; Astrit Kryeziu	26 June 2016	Balkan Championships	Pitești, Romania	

=== Women ===
Event	Record	Athlete	Date	Meet	Place	Ref.
100 m	12.61 #	Vijona Kryeziu	1 June 2013		Istanbul, Turkey	
100 m	12.36 #	Albulena Berisha	2 July 2004		Mitrovica, Serbia and Montenegro	
100 m	12.03 (+1.0 m/s)	Sara Susuri	20 June 2023	European Team Championships	Chorzów, Poland	
200 m	24.61 NWI	Vijona Kryeziu	10 June 2015		Tirana, Albania	
300 m	40.09	Vijona Kryeziu	7 July 2013		Mitrovica, Kosovo	
400 m	54.30	Vijona Kryeziu	13 August 2016	Olympic Games	Rio de Janeiro, Brazil	
600 m	1:36.24	Gresa Bakraçi	18 May 2019		Skopje, Macedonia	
800 m	2:07.67	Gresa Bakraçi	21 June 2023	European Team Championships	Chorzów, Poland	
1000 m	2:52.78	Gresa Bakraçi	21 July 2023		Mol, Belgium	
1500 m	4:14.74	Gresa Bakraçi	20 May 2026	Desafio Nerja	Nerja, Spain	
Mile	5:28.50	Luljeta Shala	27 September 2014		Mitrovica, Kosovo	
3000 m	10:19.92	Gresa Bakraçi	21 June 2020		Skopje, Macedonia	
3000 m	9:24.24	Gresa Bakraçi	17 June 2023		Ciney, Belgium	
5000 m	18:41.95	Luljeta Zhegrova-Shala	7 June 2016		Elbasan, Albania	
5000 m	17:54.5 h (Note: not ratified by Kosovo Athletic Federation but recognised by World Athletics)	Myrvete Përvetica	14/15 June 2003		Mitrovica, Serbia and Montenegro	
5000 m	18:05.90	Gresa Bakraci	22 June 2024		Gibraltar	
10,000 m	37:53.47 #	Luljeta Zhegrova-Shala	29 April 2017		Skopje, Macedonia	
10 km (road)	35:32	Gresa Bakraçi	20 November 2022		Podgorica, Montenegro	
Half marathon	1:17:24	Gresa Bakraçi	27 February		Split, Croatia	
Marathon	3:02:15	Diana Berisha-Klusóczki	23 September 2018		Krems, Austria	
100 m hurdles	18.0 h NWI #	Remzije Shala	25 May 1985		Mitrovica, Yugoslavia	
400 m hurdles	1:11.8 h #	Remzije Shala	26 May 1985		Mitrovica, Yugoslavia	
3000 m steeplechase	10:42.39	Gresa Bakraçi	22 June 2023	European Team Championships	Chorzów, Poland	
High jump	1.40 m #	Mimoza Sefedini	8 September 2013		Mitrovica, Kosovo	
High jump	1.40 m #	Merlinda Kryetziu	23 April 2017		Skopje, Macedonia	
Pole vault						
Long jump	5.30 m #	Burneta Rama	29 June 2008		Mitrovica, Kosovo	
Long jump	5.50 m #	Remzije Shala	July 1985		Mitrovica, Yugoslavia	
Triple jump	10.75 m	Rita Hajdini	30 September 2017		Mitrovica, Kosovo	
Shot put	13.33 m #	Lirije Veselaj	1 July 1979		Prizren, Yugoslavia	
Shot put	14.25 m # (Note: actually only 11.85 m)	Lirije Veselaj	19 September 1987		Mitrovica, Yugoslavia	
Shot put	12.04 m #	Alma Kojić	14 June 2008		Mitrovica, Kosovo	
Discus throw	40.80 m	Ardita Uka	11 July 2004		Mitrovica, Serbia and Montenegro	
Discus throw	40.96 m	Nartila Gega	6 April 2024		Bar, Montenegro	
Hammer throw	24.64 m	Nushe Shehu	3 July 2018		Olten, Switzerland	
Javelin throw	38.30 m #	Ardita Uka	2003		Mitrovica, Serbia and Montenegro	
Javelin throw	35.70 m #	Mirela Cikotić	29 September 2008		Mitrovica, Kosovo	
Heptathlon						
Heptathlon	100m H (wind) / High jump / Shot put / 200m (wind) / Long jump (wind) / Javelin / 800m					
20 km walk (road)						
50 km walk (road)						
4 × 100 m relay	49.99	Djellza Selaci; Lirije Peci; Rita Hajdini; Duarza Ivanja	10 August 2019		Skopje, North Macedonia	
4 × 400 m relay	4:00.03	Rita Hajdini; Lirije Peci; Albina Bojaxhiu; Albina Deliu	11 August 2019		Skopje, North Macedonia	

=== Mixed ===
Event	Record	Athlete	Date	Meet	Place	Ref.
4 × 400 m relay	3:37.59	Kosovo; Leon Thaqi; Emine Jenuzi; Granit Ahmeti; Gresa Bakraçi	22 June 2023	European Team Championships	Chorzów, Poland	

== Indoor ==
=== Men ===
Event	Record	Athlete	Date	Meet	Place	Ref.
60 m	7.09	Mentor Ajazaj	25 January 2012		Tirana, Albania	
60 m	7.09	Qëndrim Ajazaj	8 February 2013		Tirana, Albania	
200 m	21.95	Lirim Emerllahu	6 February 2021		College Station, United States	
400 m	49.59	Astrit Kryeziu	25 February 2016		Istanbul, Turkey	
800 m	1:49.31	Musa Hajdari	16 February 2019	Balkan Championships	Istanbul, Turkey	
1000 m	2:22.15	Musa Hajdari	18 February 2018	Istanbul Cup	Istanbul, Turkey	
1500 m	3:47.68	Musa Hajdari	3 March 2018	World Championships	Birmingham, United Kingdom	
3000 m	8:18.70	Albion Ymeri	5 March 2022	Balkan Championships	Istanbul, Turkey	
60 m hurdles						
High jump	1.85 m	Erudit Rysha	27 February 2016	Balkan Championships	Istanbul, Turkey	
Pole vault	2.00 m	Erudit Rysha	24 February 2018		Padova, Italy	
Long jump	6.79 m	Erudit Rysha	16 February 2019	Balkan Championships	Istanbul, Turkey	
Triple jump	10.25 m	Mergim Ukshini	5 February 2017		Magglingen, Switzerland	
Shot put	10.20 m	Alen Soltić	2 February 2015		Tirana, Albania	
Shot put	17.93 m	Muhamet Ramandani	2 March 2023	European Championships	Istanbul, Turkey	
Heptathlon						
Heptathlon	60m / Long jump / Shot put / High jump / 60m H / Pole vault / 1000m					
5000 m walk						
4 × 400 m relay						

=== Women ===
Event	Record	Athlete	Date	Meet	Place	Ref.
60 m	7.89	Rita Hajdini	2 February 2015		Tirana, Albania	
200 m						
400 m	57.85	Vijona Kryeziu	27 February 2016	Balkan Championships	Istanbul, Turkey	
600 m	1:41.76	Gresa Bakraçi	19 February 2020		Haugesund, Norway	
800 m	2:13.86	Albina Deliu	20 February 2021	Balkan Championships	Istanbul, Turkey	
800 m	2:09.53	Gresa Bakraçi	13 February 2022		Zagreb, Croatia	
1500 m	4:50.41	Gresa Bakraçi	2 February 2019		Haugesund, Norway	
1500 m	4:23.07	Gresa Bakraçi	28 January 2023		Zagreb, Croatia	
1500 m	4:23.01	Gresa Bakraçi	10 February 2024	Balkan Championships	Istanbul, Turkey	
3000 m	10:37.25	Luljeta Zhegrova-Shala	2 February 2015		Tirana, Albania	
3000 m	9:36.96	Gresa Bakraçi	2 March 2023	European Championships	Istanbul, Turkey	
60 m hurdles						
High jump						
Pole vault						
Long jump	4.35 m	Fitore Ramadani	9 February 2013		Ancona, Italy	
Triple jump	9.78 m	Rita Hajdini	2 February 2015		Tirana, Albania	
Shot put						
Pentathlon						
Pentathlon	60m H / High jump / Shot put / Long jump / 800m					
3000 m walk						
4 × 400 m relay						
