= Kosovo at the 2022 European Athletics Championships =

- WA code: KOS
- National federation: Kosovo Athletic Federation
- Website: www.fakosova.org

in Munich
- Competitors: 2 (1 man and 1 woman) in 2 events
- Medals: Gold 0 Silver 0 Bronze 0 Total 0

European Athletics Championships appearances (overview)
- 2016; 2018; 2022; 2024

Kosovo competed at the 2022 European Athletics Championships in Munich, Germany, from 15–21 August 2018. A delegation of 2 athletes represented the country.

== Results ==
The following athletes were selected to compete by the Kosovo Athletic Federation:

=== Men ===
Field events

Athlete	Event	Qualification		Final	
Athlete	Event	Distance	Rank	Distance	Rank
Muhamet Ramadani	Shot put	18.62	22	did not advance	

=== Women ===
Track and road

Athletes	Event	Heats		Semifinal		Final	
Athletes	Event	Result	Rank	Result	Rank	Result	Rank
Gresa Bakraći	1500 metres	4:38.10	27	did not advance			

== See also ==
- Kosovo at the 2022 European Championships
