= Kosovo at the 2018 European Championships =

- WA code: KOS

in (United Kingdom) Glasgow (Germany) Berlin 2 August 2018 – 12 August 2018
- Competitors: 6 in 2 sports
- Medals: Gold 0 Silver 0 Bronze 0 Total 0

European Championships appearances (overview)
- 2018; 2022

Kosovo competed at the inaugural 7 sports 2018 European Championships from 2 to 12 August 2018.

== Competitors ==
Six competitors competed in two sports; two competing in athletics and four in aquatics.

=== Athletics ===
Men
Track and road

Athletes	Event	Heats		Semifinal		Final	
Athletes	Event	Result	Rank	Result	Rank	Result	Rank
Musa Hajdari	800 metres	1:49.24	30	did not advance			

Women
Track and road

Athletes	Event	Heats		Semifinal		Final	
Athletes	Event	Result	Rank	Result	Rank	Result	Rank
Gresa Bakraći	800 metres	2:14.22	31	did not advance			

== See also ==
- Kosovo at the European Championships
