= Lajtha =

Lajtha is a surname. Notable people with the surname include:

- Kate Lajtha (born 1957), American ecologist
- László Lajtha (1892–1963), Hungarian composer and conductor

== See also ==
- Leitha (Hungarian: Lajta), a river in Austria and Hungary
