= Kosovo at the 2018 European Athletics Championships =

- WA code: KOS
- National federation: FAK
- Website: www.fakosova.org

in Berlin
- Competitors: 2

European Athletics Championships appearances (overview)
- 2016; 2018; 2022; 2024

Kosovo competed at the 2018 European Athletics Championships in Berlin, Germany, from 6–12 August 2018. A delegation of 2 athletes were sent to represent the country.

The following athletes were selected to compete by the Kosovo Athletic Federation.

Men
Track and road

Athletes	Event	Heats		Semifinal		Final	
Athletes	Event	Result	Rank	Result	Rank	Result	Rank
Musa Hajdari	800 metres	1:49.24	30	did not advance			

Women
Track and road

Athletes	Event	Heats		Semifinal		Final	
Athletes	Event	Result	Rank	Result	Rank	Result	Rank
Gresa Bakraći	800 metres	2:14.22	31	did not advance			
