= Torre de Maro =

- Torre de Maro
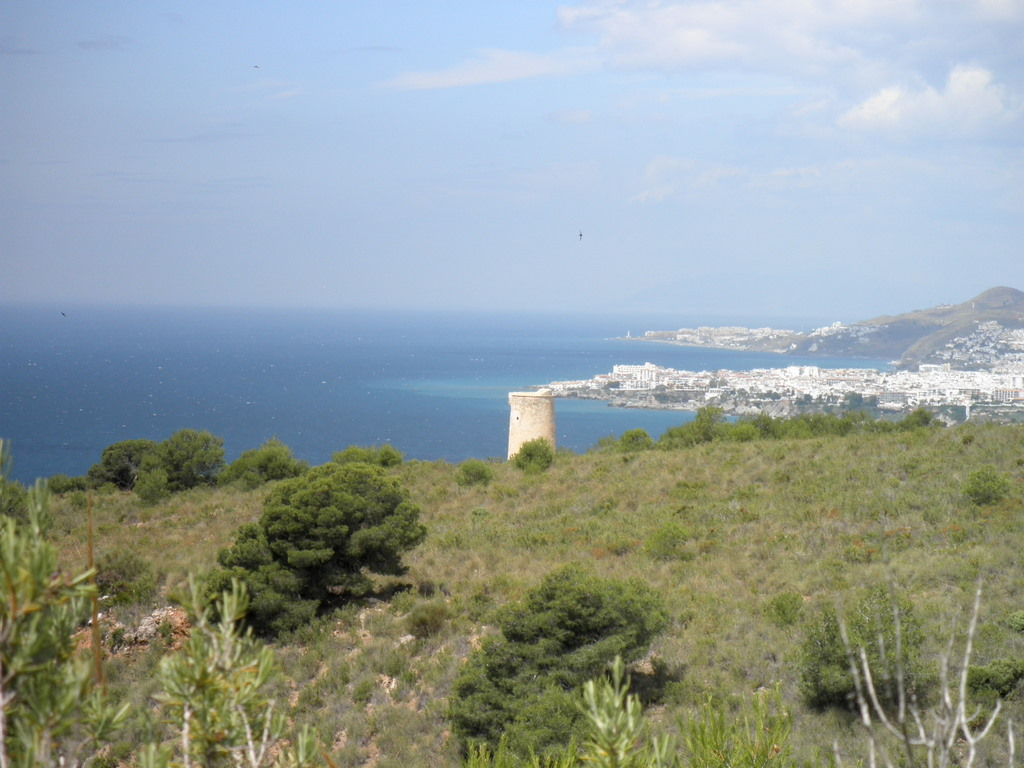
- Torre de Maro and its surroundings
- Interactive map of the Torre de Maro area

General information
- Type: Coastal watchtower
- Architectural style: Military
- Location: Nerja, Province of Málaga, Andalusia, Spain
- Coordinates: 36°45′13″N 3°49′48″W

The Torre de Maro, also known as the Torre de Calaturcos, is a 16th-century coastal watchtower located in the municipality of Nerja, Málaga, in the Andalusian region of southern Spain. It stands on a rocky platform near the edge of a cliff, east of Maro beach and within the Maro-Cerro Gordo Natural Park. On 29 June 1986 it was declared a Bien de Interés Cultural (Asset of Cultural Interest), the highest level of heritage protection in Spain, under registration code RI-51-0008068.

== Setting ==
The tower sits above the Maro coastline surrounded by scrubland and close to a cliff drop, with unobstructed views of the Mediterranean Sea in both directions. The Maro-Cerro Gordo Natural Park, within which the tower stands, stretches for roughly twelve kilometres along the boundary between the provinces of Málaga and Granada. Its landscape of steep cliffs, hidden coves and marine habitats has been designated a specially protected area of Mediterranean importance. Andalucia.com describes the park as home to five 16th-century watchtowers along this single stretch of coast, of which Torre de Maro is the westernmost.

== Architecture ==
The tower has a truncated-cone shape with a slight entasis. Its perimeter exceeds 20 metres and it stands roughly 11 metres tall. The lower section is solid masonry. Above it sits a chamber whose entrance opens on the south side, around 6 metres above ground level. Two further openings face east and west. Inside, the original layout included a fireplace with a smoke outlet on the roof terrace and a staircase leading up to the flat roof. A projecting machicolation survives above the entrance on the north side of the parapet. The walls are built in rubble masonry and were later rendered with plaster. Brick was used for the entrance opening and certain other elements.

== History ==
The tower was built as part of a defensive network that ran along the entire Andalusian coast, both Mediterranean and Atlantic, during the 15th and 16th centuries. After the Christian conquest of the Kingdom of Granada in 1492, the coast was left largely depopulated and vulnerable to raids from the sea. Barbary pirates operating out of ports along the North African coast, including Tangier, found the sheltered bays of this coastline well suited for landing parties: they came ashore for fresh water and provisions and took captive local farmers and fishermen to sell as slaves. Andalucia.com notes that the threat of these raids created a situation of continuous danger that destabilised an already fragile rural economy.

The towers of the Maro-Cerro Gordo stretch formed a chain of visual communication posts. Watchmen on duty signalled danger to neighbouring towers and settlements using smoke during daylight and fire at night, passing warnings along the coast faster than any messenger could travel overland. Almería 4 Value, which has published independent research on the coastal watchtower network, notes that the system had its roots in Moorish lookout posts dating back to the 8th century, though most of the towers visible today are Christian-era reconstructions from the early 16th century.

The nearest towers in the same network were the Torre Río de la Miel, the Torre del Pino, the Torre Caleta and the Torre de Cerro Gordo, all visible from one another along this coast.

Local conservation work was carried out on the tower as recently as 2009 to protect the structure from further deterioration.

== Access ==
The tower is reached by a signposted track from the N-340 highway, approximately 500 metres east of the village of Maro. A wide dirt path leads roughly 600 metres uphill from the roadside to the tower. The route offers views west towards Maro and Nerja and east towards Cerro Gordo and the Granada coast.

== Bibliography ==
- Falcón Márquez, Teodoro (1989). Torres de almenara del Reino de Granada en tiempos de Carlos III. Seville: Junta de Andalucía, Consejería de Obras Públicas y Transportes. ISBN 84-8700-117-3.
- Fernández Cacho, Silvia; Chiclana Rodríguez, Marta (2005). "Torres de vigilancia costera y Paisaje: integración de valores culturales y naturales en el Paraje de Maro-Cerro Gordo". Boletín del Instituto Andaluz de Patrimonio Histórico, 55: 93–101. Seville: Instituto Andaluz del Patrimonio Histórico.
