= Navachica =

Mountain in Spain

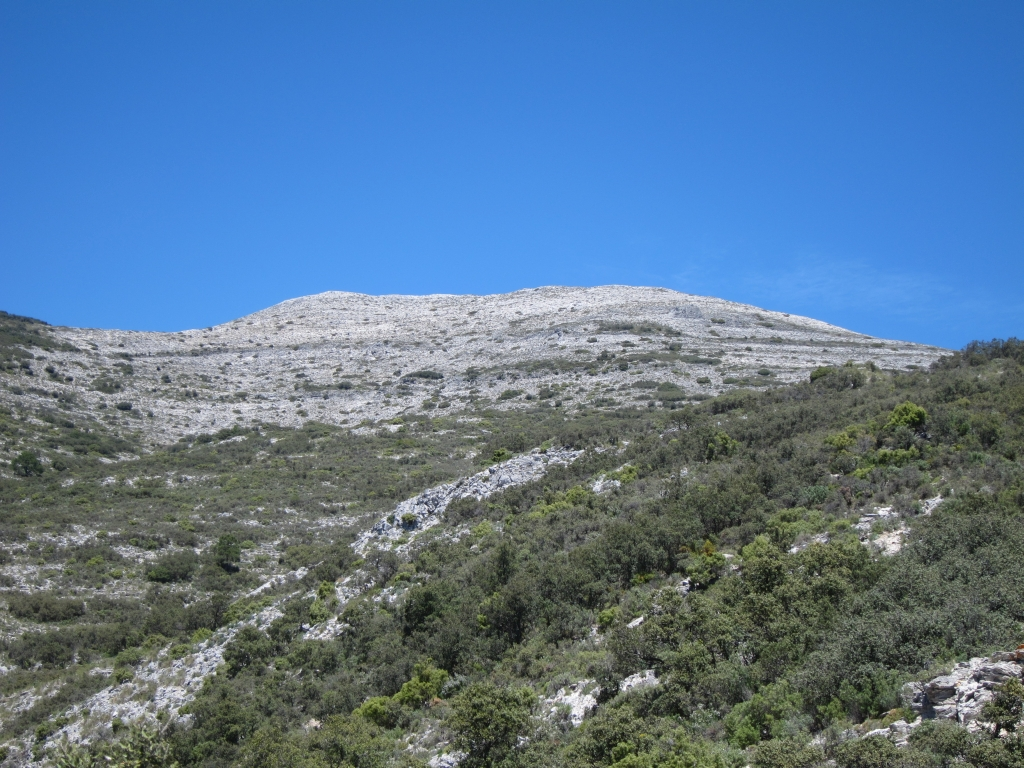

Highest point
- Elevation: 1,831 m (6,007 ft)
- Prominence: 597 m (1,959 ft)
- Parent peak: La Maroma
- Isolation: 19.75 km (12.27 mi)
- Coordinates: 36.841917°N 3.815306°W

Geography
- Location within Spain
- Country: Spain
- Autonomous community: Andalusia
- Province: Málaga
- Parent range: Sierra Almijara

Geology
- Mountain type: Sedimentary
- Rock type: Calcareous formations

Navachica is a mountain in the Province of Málaga in southern Spain, the highest peak in the Sierra Almijara.

== Location ==
The Pico Navachica is the highest peak in the Sierra Almijara. The peak has an elevation of 1,831 metres (6,007 ft), prominence of 597 metres (1,959 ft) and isolation of 19.57 kilometres (12.16 mi) from La Maroma to the WNW. The mountain is in the Nerja municipality of the Axarquía, which extends from the mountains down to the Mediterranean Sea. It is in the Sierras of Tejeda, Almijara and Alhama Natural Park.

== Access ==
The peak may be reached from the El Pinarillo recreational area near the coast to the south along the Barranco de los Cazadores route. From El Pinarillo Area to Waypoint STA-017 the route climbs 655 metres (2,149 ft) in a length of 5.7 kilometres (3.5 mi), much of the way through a dry riverbed. From there to the peak of Navachica it climbs a further 785 metres (2,575 ft) in a length of 10 kilometres (6.2 mi). From the peak there is a panoramic view of the Cerro del Lucero and Maroma peaks.

== Geology ==
The Sierra Almijara holds one of the Spain's main sources of dolomitic marble. The marble gives white and gray tones to the ridges and ravines. There are areas of dolomitic sands on Navachica.

== Sources ==
- Coxall, Malcolm (18 July 2013), Traditional Recipes of the Axarquia, Malcolm Coxall - Cornelio Books, ISBN 978-84-940853-7-6
- Decreto 2/2016, de 12 de enero, por el que se declara la Zona Especial de Conservación Sierras de Tejeda, Almijara y Alhama (Es6170007) y se aprueban el plan de ordenación de los recursos naturales y el plan rector de uso y gestión del Parque Natural Sierras de Tejeda, Almijara y Alhama (PDF) (in Spanish), Consejería de Medio Ambiente y Ordenación del Territorio
- Loidi, Javier (18 September 2017), The Vegetation of the Iberian Peninsula, Springer, ISBN 978-3-319-54867-8
- Muñoz, Rafael (November 2013), El Pinarillo - Navachica (1.831 mts) (Sierra de Tejeda y Almijara, Málaga)
- Parque natural Sierras de Tejeda, Almijara y Alhama (in Spanish), Junta de Andalucía
- "Pico de Navachica, Spain", Peakbagger.com
- Williams, Jo, "Sierras of Tejeda, Almijara and Almara Natural Park", Andalucia.com
