= Kosovo at the 2022 World Athletics Championships =

- Flag of Kosovo
- WA code: KOS

in Eugene, United States 15 July 2022 – 24 July 2022
- Competitors: 1 (1 woman)
- Medals: Gold 0 Silver 0 Bronze 0 Total 0

World Athletics Championships appearances (overview)
- 2015; 2017; 2019; 2022; 2023

Other related appearances
- Yugoslavia (1983–1991); Serbia and Montenegro (1998–2005); Serbia (2007–2013)

Kosovo competed at the 2022 World Athletics Championships in Eugene, United States, from 15 to 24 July 2022.

== Results ==
Kosovo has entered 1 athletes.

Key

- Q = Qualified for the next round
- q = Qualified for the next round as a fastest loser or, in field events, by position without achieving the qualifying target
- NR = National record
- PB = Personal best
- SB = Season best
- N/A = Round not applicable for the event

=== Women ===
Track and road events

Athlete	Event	Heat		Semi-final		Final	
Athlete	Event	Result	Rank	Result	Rank	Result	Rank
Gresa Bakraçi	1500 metres	4:22.77	41	Did not advance			
