= Kosovo at the 2024 European Athletics Championships =

- Flag of Kosovo
- WA code: KOS

in Rome, Italy 7 June 2024 – 12 June 2022
- Competitors: 2 (1 man and 1 woman)

European Athletics Championships appearances (overview)
- 2016; 2018; 2022; 2024

Kosovo competed at the 2024 European Athletics Championships in Rome, Italy from 7–12 June 2024.

== Results ==
Kosovo entered the following athletes.

Key

- Q = Qualified for the next round
- q = Qualified for the next round as a fastest loser or, in field events, by position without achieving the qualifying target
- NR = National record
- PB = Personal best
- SB = Season best
- N/A = Round not applicable for the event

=== Men ===
Field events

Athlete	Event	Qualification		Final	
Athlete	Event	Distance	Position	Distance	Position
Muhamet Ramadani	Shot put	19.10	20	Did not advance	

=== Women ===
Track and road events

Athlete	Event	Heat		Semifinal		Final	
Athlete	Event	Result	Rank	Result	Rank	Result	Rank
Gresa Bakraçi	800 metres	2:08.35	30	Did not advance			
