= 2026 European Athletics Championships – Women's 5000 metres =

Women's 5000 metres at the 2026 European Athletics Championships
- Venue: Alexander Stadium
- Location: Birmingham, United Kingdom
- Dates: 11 August 2026
- Competitors: 26 (entered)
- Winning time: 15:37.84

Medalists
gold medal	Nadia Battocletti	Italy
silver medal	Marta García	Spain
bronze medal	Micol Majori	Italy

The women's 5000 metres at the 2026 European Athletics Championships took place at the Alexander Stadium in Birmingham, United Kingdom, on 11 August 2026.

== Background ==
Records before the 2026 European Athletics Championships
Record	Athlete (nation)	Time	Location	Date
World record	Beatrice Chebet (KEN)	13:58.06	Eugene, United States	5 July 2025
European record	Sifan Hassan (NED)	14:13.42	London, United Kingdom	23 July 2023
Championship record	Nadia Battocletti (ITA)	14:35.29	Rome, Italy	7 June 2024
World leading	Likina Amebaw (ETH)	14:18.41	Rome, Italy	4 June 2026
European leading	Maureen Koster (NED)	14:33.56	Rome, Italy	4 June 2026

== Qualification ==
For the women's 5000 metres, the qualification period was from 27 July 2025 to 26 July 2026. Athletes qualified by running the entry standard of 15:05.00 min or faster, by wildcard for the 2024 European Athletics Champion, or by their position on the World Athletics Rankings for the event. The target number was 25 athletes.

Qualification standings per 31 July 2026
QP	CP	Country	Athlete	Status	Details
1	1	Italy	Nadia Battocletti	Qualified by Wild Card	Defending European Champion
2	1	Spain	Marta García	Qualified by Entry Standard	14:33.40 - Boudewijnstadion, Bruxelles (BEL) - 22 AUG 2025
3	1	Netherlands	Maureen Koster	Qualified by Entry Standard	14:33.56 - Stadio Olimpico, Roma (ITA) - 04 JUN 2026
4	1	Belgium	Elise Vanderelst	Qualified by Entry Standard	14:40.70 - Boudewijnstadion, Bruxelles (BEL) - 22 AUG 2025
5	1	Great Britain & N.I.	Hannah Nuttall	Qualified by Entry Standard	14:48.09 - National Stadium, Tokyo (JPN) - 18 SEP 2025
6	2	Great Britain & N.I.	Innes Fitzgerald	Qualified by Entry Standard	14:48.84 - Boudewijnstadion, Bruxelles (BEL) - 22 AUG 2025
7	1	Ireland	Sarah Healy	Qualified by Entry Standard	14:48.88 - Stadio Olimpico, Roma (ITA) - 04 JUN 2026
8	2	Spain	Idaira Prieto	Qualified by Entry Standard	14:55.15 - Putbosstadion, Oordegem (BEL) - 09 AUG 2025
9	2	Italy	Elisa Palmero	Qualified by Entry Standard	14:57.87 - Putbosstadion, Oordegem (BEL) - 09 AUG 2025
10	3	Great Britain & N.I.	India Weir	Qualified by Entry Standard	15:01.92 - Putbosstadion, Oordegem (BEL) - 09 AUG 2025
11	3	Italy	Micol Majori	Qualified by Entry Standard	15:04.32 - Giovanni Chiggiato Stadium, Caorle (ITA) - 02 AUG 2025
12	1	Kosovo	Gresa Bakraçi	Qualified by Universality Place	
13	1	Finland	Nathalie Blomqvist	Qualified by World Rankings	11th - 1183 points
14	4	Italy	Federica Del Buono	Qualified by World Rankings	12th - 1181 points
reserve	4	Great Britain & N.I.	Eloise Walker	Qualified by World Rankings	15th - 1174 points
15	2	Netherlands	Amina Maatoug	Qualified by World Rankings	17th - 1170 points
16	3	Spain	María Forero	Qualified by World Rankings	18th - 1165 points
17	1	Sweden	Vera Sjöberg	Qualified by World Rankings	19th - 1160 points
18	1	Norway	Amalie Sæten	Qualified by World Rankings	22nd - 1158 points
19	1	Austria	Lisa Redlinger	Qualified by World Rankings	23rd - 1157 points
20	3	Netherlands	Jennifer Gulikers	Qualified by World Rankings	26th - 1153 points
21	1	Germany	Vanessa Mikitenko	Qualified by World Rankings	30th - 1147 points
22	2	Norway	Anna Marie Nordengen Sirevåg	Qualified by World Rankings	33rd - 1145 points
23	2	Finland	Aino Suni	Qualified by World Rankings	37th - 1138 points
24	1	Luxembourg	Vera Bertemes-Hoffmann	Qualified by World Rankings	42nd - 1127 points
25	3	Norway	Madelène Wanvik Holum	Qualified by World Rankings	46th - 1119 points
reserve	5	Italy	Chiara Munaretto	Next best by World Rankings	78th - 1073 points
reserve	1	Turkey	Sümeyye Erol	Next best by World Rankings	84th - 1070 points

Bye to semi-finals	Reserve activated	Withdrawal / reserve unused

== Schedule ==
Date	Time	Round
11 August 2026	19:25	Final

All times are local times (UTC+1)

== Results ==
Place	Athlete	Nation	Time	Notes
1st place, gold medalist(s)	Nadia Battocletti	Italy	15:37.84	
2nd place, silver medalist(s)	Marta García	Spain	15:39.98	SB
3rd place, bronze medalist(s)	Micol Majori	Italy	15:40.65	
4	Sarah Healy	Ireland	15:40.95	
5	Hannah Nuttall	Great Britain & N.I.	15:41.27	
6	Maureen Koster	Netherlands	15:41.51	
7	Amina Maatoug	Netherlands	15:44.03	
8	María Forero	Spain	15:44.25	
9	Idaira Prieto	Spain	15:44.89	
10	Vera Sjöberg	Sweden	15:48.80	
11	Federica Del Buono	Italy	15:49.41	
12	Aino Suni	Finland	15:54.25	
13	Jennifer Gulikers	Netherlands	15:54.29	
14	Vanessa Mikitenko	Germany	15:54.49	
15	Anna Marie Nordengen Sirevåg	Norway	15:55.26	
16	India Weir	Great Britain & N.I.	15:55.42	
17	Lisa Redlinger	Austria	15:57.19	
18	Nathalie Blomqvist	Finland	15:58.36	
19	Innes Fitzgerald	Great Britain & N.I.	16:00.07	
20	Madelène Wanvik Holum	Norway	16:01.44	
21	Elise Vanderelst	Belgium	16:08.62	SB
22	Vera Bertemes-Hoffmann	Luxembourg	16:38.90	
—	Gresa Bakraçi	Kosovo	DNF	
