= Kosovo at the 2022 European Championships =

in (Germany) Munich 11 August 2022 – 21 August 2022
- Competitors: 6 in 3 sports
- Medals: Gold 0 Silver 0 Bronze 0 Total 0

European Championships appearances (overview)
- 2018; 2022

Kosovo is competed at the 2022 European Championships in Munich, Germany, from 11–21 August 2018. A delegation of 6 athletes represented the country in three sport; athletics, cycling and table tennis.

== Competitors ==
The following is the list of number of competitors in the Championships:

Sport	Men	Women	Total
Athletics	1	1	2
Cycling road	2	0	2
Table Tennis	1	1	2
Total	4	2	6

== Athletics ==
The following athletes were selected to compete by the Kosovo Athletic Federation:

=== Men ===
Field events

Athlete	Event	Qualification		Final	
Athlete	Event	Distance	Rank	Distance	Rank
Muhamet Ramadani	Shot put	18.62	22	did not advance	

=== Women ===
Track and road

Athletes	Event	Heats		Semifinal		Final	
Athletes	Event	Result	Rank	Result	Rank	Result	Rank
Gresa Bakraći	1500 metres	4:38.10	27	did not advance			

== Cycling ==
=== Road ===
Men

Athlete	Event	Time	Rank
Alban Delija	Road race	DNF	
Blerton Nuha	Road race	DNF	

Athlete	Event	Time	Rank
Alban Delija	Time trial	34:59.32	35
Blerton Nuha	Time trial	34:56.74	34

== Table Tennis ==
=== Men ===
Athlete	Event	Qualification stage				Preliminary Round 1	Preliminary Round 2	Round of 64	Round of 32	Round of 16	Quarterfinals	Semifinals	Final / BM	
Athlete	Event	Opposition Score	Opposition Score	Opposition Score	Rank	Opposition Score	Opposition Score	Opposition Score	Opposition Score	Opposition Score	Opposition Score	Opposition Score	Opposition Score	Rank
Fatih Karabaxhak	Singles	Martinko (CZE); L 3–0	Alexandrov (BUL); L 3–0	Serdaroglu (AUT); L 3–0		did not advance								
Fatih Karabaxhak; Filip Mladenovski (MKD)	Men's Doubles	—				Pitchford (ENG) & Gorth (DEN); L 3–0	did not advance							

=== Women ===
Athlete	Event	Qualification stage				Preliminary Round 1	Preliminary Round 2	Round of 64	Round of 32	Round of 16	Quarterfinals	Semifinals	Final / BM	
Athlete	Event	Opposition Score	Opposition Score	Opposition Score	Rank	Opposition Score	Opposition Score	Opposition Score	Opposition Score	Opposition Score	Opposition Score	Opposition Score	Opposition Score	Rank
Linda Zeqiri	Singles	Bergand (SWE); L 3–0	Mešetović (BIH); L 3–2	Tomanovska (CZE); L WO		did not advance								
Linda Zeqiri; Amelija Uce-Nikolov (MKD)	Woman's Doubles	—				Puchovanova (SVK) & Yilmaz (TUR); L 3–0	did not advance							

=== Doubles ===
Athlete	Event	Preliminary Round 1	Preliminary Round 2	Round of 32	Round of 16	Quarterfinals	Semifinals	Final / BM	
Athlete	Event	Opposition Score	Opposition Score	Opposition Score	Opposition Score	Opposition Score	Opposition Score	Opposition Score	Rank
Fatih Karabaxhak; Linda Zeqiri	Mixed Doubles	(Greenland) Nielsen (GRL) & Musajeva (LAT); L 3–1	did not advance						
