= Cerro del Lucero =

Mountain in Spain

- Raspón de los Moriscos
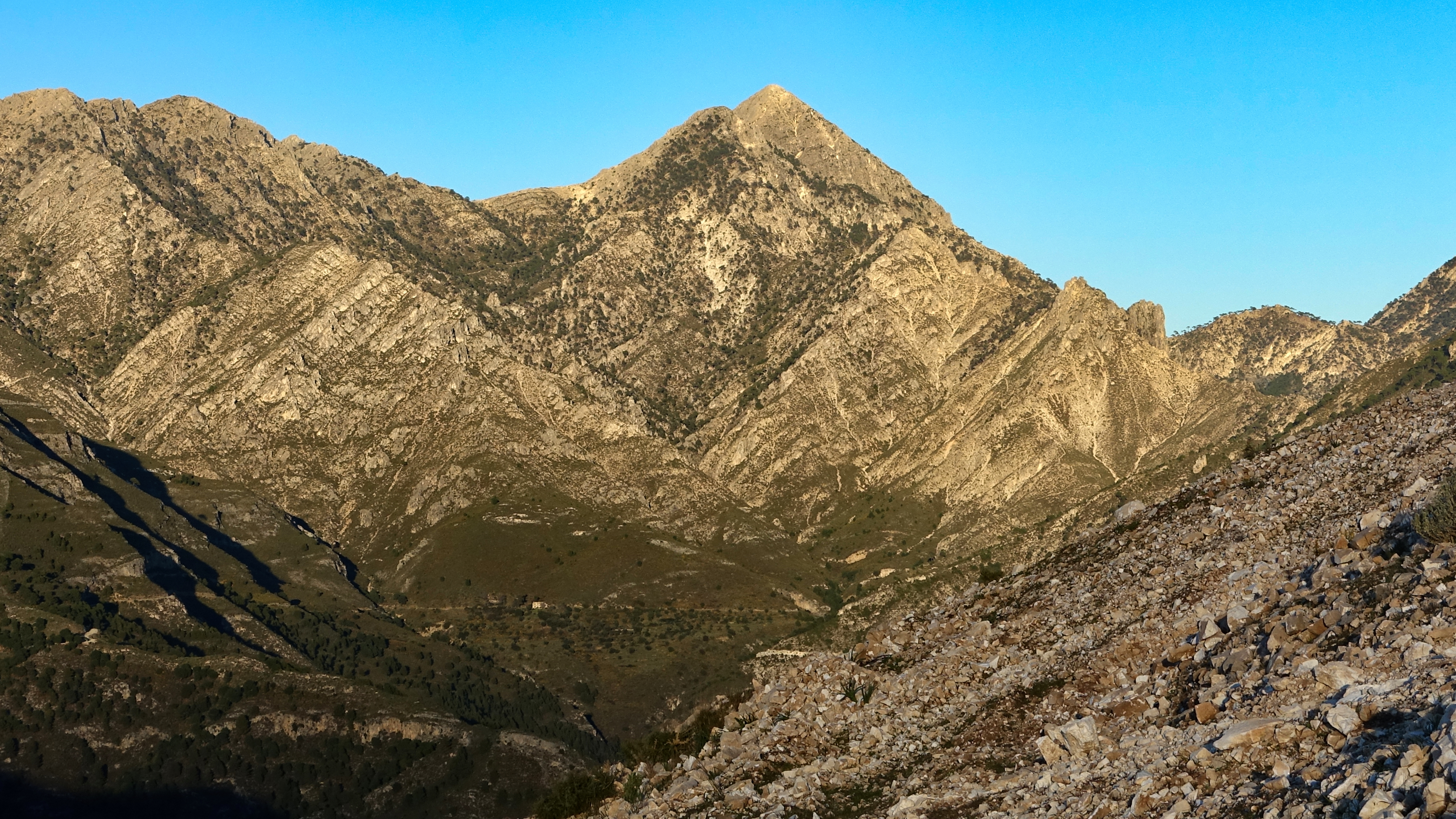

Highest point
- Elevation: 1,774 m (5,820 ft)
- Prominence: 370 m (1,210 ft)
- Parent peak: Navachica
- Coordinates: 36.867537°N 3.890464°W

Geography
- Location within Spain
- Country: Spain
- Autonomous community: Andalusia
- Province: Málaga and Granada
- Parent range: Sierra Almijara

Geology
- Mountain type: Sedimentary
- Rock type: Calcareous formations

The Cerro del Lucero, also known as El Lucero, Raspón de los Moriscos or Cerro de los Moriscos, is a mountain in the Alhama de Granada municipality of the Province of Granada in southern Spain, in the Sierra Almijara.

== Location ==
The Cerro del Lucero is in the Sierras of Tejeda, Almijara and Alhama Natural Park. The Sierra Almijara is a rough mass of marble mountains with sharp ridges that stretched east from the Puerto de Cómpeta. The most prominent peak is the Cerro Lucero. The mountain has an elevation of 1,774 metres (5,820 ft), and the peak has a prominence of 370 metres (1,210 ft). The peak is 7.28 kilometres (4.52 mi) from Navachica (1,831 metres (6,007 ft)) in an ESE direction and 14.38 kilometres (8.94 mi) from La Maroma (2,069 metres (6,788 ft) in a WNW direction.

== Access ==
The Cerro del Lucero is on the border between Malaga and Granada, and can be accessed from both provinces. The peak can be accessed from the La Resinera information point, heading south for about 12.6 kilometres (7.8 mi) along a path to the start of the trail. From here a 3 kilometres (1.9 mi) trail with high difficulty leads to the peak.

== Peak ==
The Cerro del Lucero is pyramidal or conical in shape. The local name is the Cerro de los Moriscos, and its prominent ridge, sharp in the south and somewhat less so in the north, is called the Raspón de los Moriscos. The Raspón de los Moriscos is visible from almost all of the eastern part of the province of Málaga.

From the Pico Lucero there are imposing views of the Depression of Granada, Los Bermejales Reservoir, Sierra Nevada, the Higuerón river basin, the Axarquía and the Rif mountain range in Morocco. There is a semi-ruined Civil Guard post at the summit that was built after the Spanish Civil War (1936–1939) when the mountains were the base for the Granada-Málaga Guerrilla Group, which fought against Francoist Spain until their final defeat in 1951.

== Geology ==
The Sierra Almijara holds one of Spain's main sources of dolomitic marble. The marble gives white and gray tones to the ridges and ravines.

== Sources ==
- Decreto 2/2016, de 12 de enero, por el que se declara la Zona Especial de Conservación Sierras de Tejeda, Almijara y Alhama (Es6170007) y se aprueban el plan de ordenación de los recursos naturales y el plan rector de uso y gestión del Parque Natural Sierras de Tejeda, Almijara y Alhama (PDF) (in Spanish), Consejería de Medio Ambiente y Ordenación del Territorio
- Muñoz, Rafael (November 2013), El Pinarillo - Navachica (1.831 mts) (Sierra de Tejeda y Almijara, Málaga)
- Parque natural Sierras de Tejeda, Almijara y Alhama (in Spanish), Junta de Andalucía
- "Puerto Blanquillo - Raspón de Los Moriscos", Rural Sierra y Sol (in Spanish)
- Sendero Señalizado del Lucero (in Spanish), Junta de Andalucia
- Steve Smith, "Cerro de los Moriscos, Spain", peakbagger
- Williams, Jo, "Sierras of Tejeda, Almijara and Almara Natural Park", Andalucia.com
