= Kosovo at the European Athletics Championships =

Kosovo at the 2018 European Athletics Championships
- WA code: KOS
- National federation: FAK
- Website: www.fakosova.org
- Medals: Gold 0 Silver 0 Bronze 0 Total 0

European Athletics Championships appearances (overview)
- 2016; 2018; 2022; 2024

Kosovo has competed in the European Athletics Championships since 2016.

== Medal count ==
Games	Athletes	Gold	Silver	Bronze	Total
(Netherlands) 2016 Amsterdam (details)	2	0	0	0	0
(Germany) 2018 Berlin (details)	2	0	0	0	0
(France) 2020 Paris	Cancelled				
(Germany) 2022 Munich (details)	2	0	0	0	0
Total		0	0	0	0

== See also ==
- Kosovo at the World Athletics Championships
- Kosovo at the European Championships
