= Micol Majori =

Italian long-distance runner (born 1998)

- Majori at the 2026 European Athletics Championships

Personal information
- Born: 4 June 1998 (age 28)

Sport
- Sport: Athletics
- Event: Long-distance running
Medal record
Women's athletics
Representing Italy
European Championships
Bronze medal – third place	2026 Birmingham	5000 m
Mediterranean Games
Silver medal – second place	2026 Taranto	5000 m

Micol Majori (born 4 June 1998) is an Italian long-distance runner. She won the bronze medal at the 2026 European Athletics Championships in the 5000 metres. She was the Italian champion in the 5000 metres in 2022, and has also won national titles in short course cross country running.

== Career ==
From Milan, Majori is a member of the athletics club Pro Sesto Atletica Cernusco.

Majori competed for Italy at the 2021 European Cross Country Championships in Dublin, Ireland as part of the mixed relay team which placed eighth overall. She won the 2022 Italian Athletics Championships in the 5000 metres in June 2022. Her time of 16:00.08 improved by almost eight seconds her own personal best.

Majori placed third in the short course race at the 2023 Italian Cross Country Championships. She also placed third over 3000 metres at the 2023 Italian Indoor Championships in 9:19.09. Competing at the 2023 European Athletics Indoor Championships in Istanbul, she finished the 3000 metres in a 9:16.40.

Majori ran a 1500 meters indoor personal best in Ancona, with a time of 4:14.43, on New Year's Day in January 2024. She won the Italian short course cross country championships in Lazio in March 2024. In June 2024, Majori raced for Italy at the home 2024 European Athletics Championships in Rome over 5000 meters.

In March 2025, she retained her title at the 2025 Italian Short Course Championships in Cassino. Majori represented Italy at the 2025 European Athletics Indoor Championships in Apeldoorn, Netherlands, running 9:13.01 for the 3000 metres. In August, she was runner-up to Nadia Battocletti over 5000 m at the Italian Championships. She subsequently competed in Tokyo, Japan, running 15:14.66 for the 5000 metres at the 2025 World Championships in September 2025.

Majori placed eleventh in the 3000 metres at the 2026 World Athletics Indoor Championships in Toruń, Poland, in March 2026. At the 2026 European Athletics Championships in Birmingham, she won the bronze medal over 5000 metres behind Battocletti and Spain's Marta Garcia, running 15:40.65.
