= Granada Basin =

Valley of Andalusia, Spain

Coordinates: 37°06′N 3°50′W

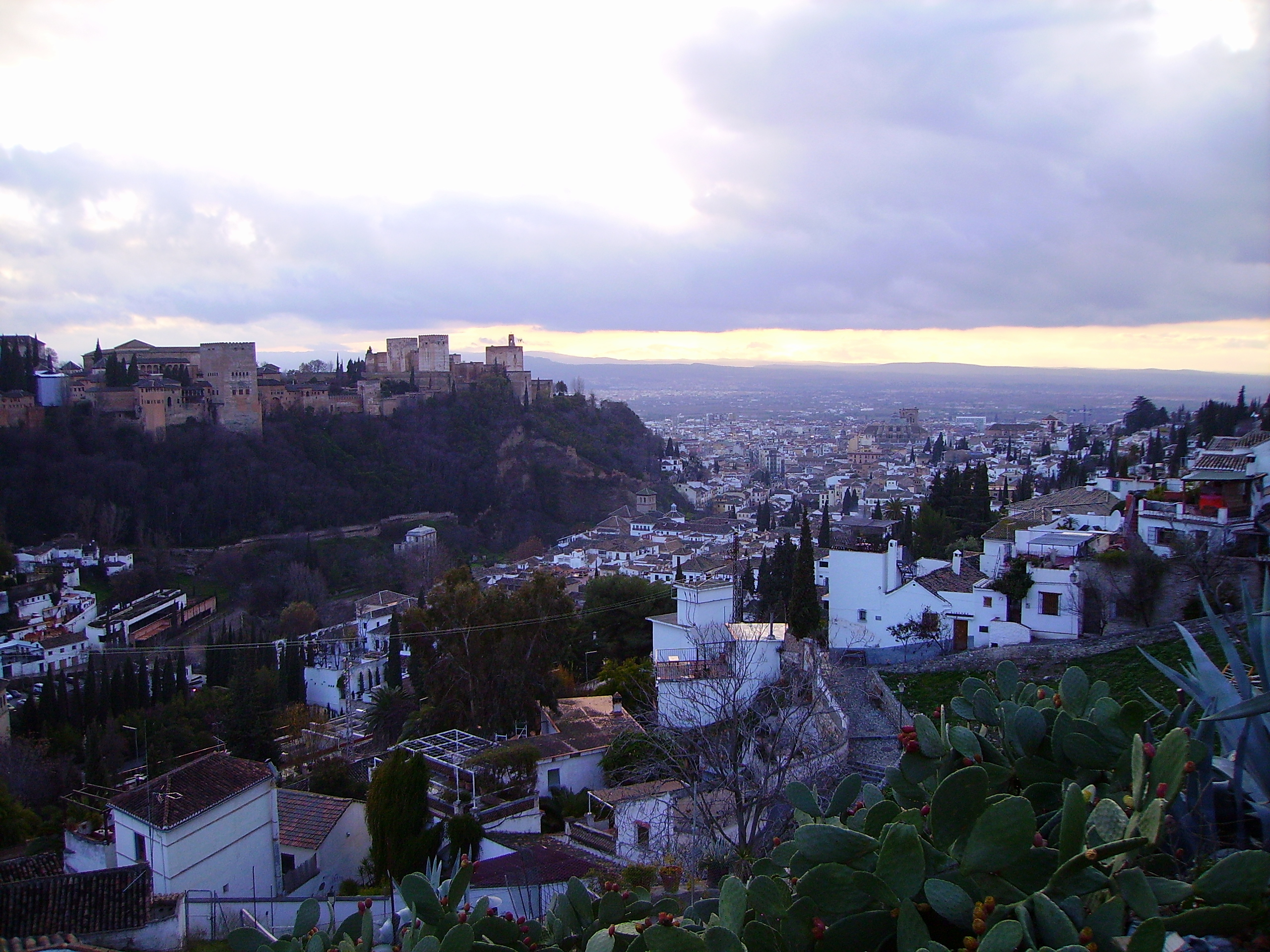
Looking from the Albaicín to the Alhambra, with the central city of Granada spread out below on the plain of the Depression.

The Granada Basin, Depression of Granada or Granada Depression (Spanish: Depresión de Granada) is a totally enclosed valley in Andalusia, Spain. The river Genil runs through the valley upon exiting from the Sierra Nevada until it passes through the Infiernos de Loja. On the north it borders the comarca of Los Montes on the southern border of the Cordillera Subbética; on the north west are the Sierra de Loja and El Hacho; on the southwest the Sierra Gorda; in the south the Sierra de la Almijara; and in the east the aforementioned Sierra Nevada. It is one of the series of valleys forming the Surco Intrabético.

The two easiest points of communication with the outside world are the threshold between the Sierra Nevada and the Sierra de la Almijara (the Lecrin Valley) and the gorge of the River Genil in the Infiernos de Loja, which separates El Hacho from the Sierra Gorda. It runs roughly east–west for about 65 kilometres (40 mi) and reaches its greatest width in the eastern part and its narrowest as it arrives at the Infiernos de Loja.

== Geology ==
The depression has been enclosed since the Miocene era, possibly as early as the Burdigalian. It took on its current shape by the end of the Miocene, acting as an enclosed drainage basin of continental character, receiving sedimentary material from all of the surrounding mountain ranges. The peak of this sedimentation activity was during the Villafranchian (the first phase of the Pleistocene); at that time there appears to have been a climate change that caused a period of rhexistasy (dryness leading to lack of ground cover) and intense erosion of all of the surrounding mountain ranges. Large pieces of detritus fell to the foot of the Sierra Nevada, such as the Cono de La Zubia, the conglomerate of the Alhambra or the block formation of the Cono del Río Dúrcal.

After this period of filling in, came a period of isostatic deepening. The weight of the recent deposits bore down on the sediments below, at the same time as erosion decreased and the mountains began to grow. At the same time, the drainage basin that had basically been an inland sea began to pour out its waters through the River Genil and the Infiernos de Loja. The river and its tributaries were carved out, and after the Quaternary climate crisis, river terraces formed. The River Genil has two well-defined terraces. The deepening of the Depression of Granada at the foot of the Sierra Nevada led to the formation of a flooded area between Santa Fe and Granada. The Quaternary also produced a diapiric uprising of a mass of gypsum clay to the height of the town of Láchar, which made area from Láchar to Granada more easily flooded, and broke the original depression into two units the Depression of Granada and the Pasillo or Depression of Loja.
