= Caves of Nerja =

Cave and archaeological site in Spain

- Cueva de Nerja (Spanish)
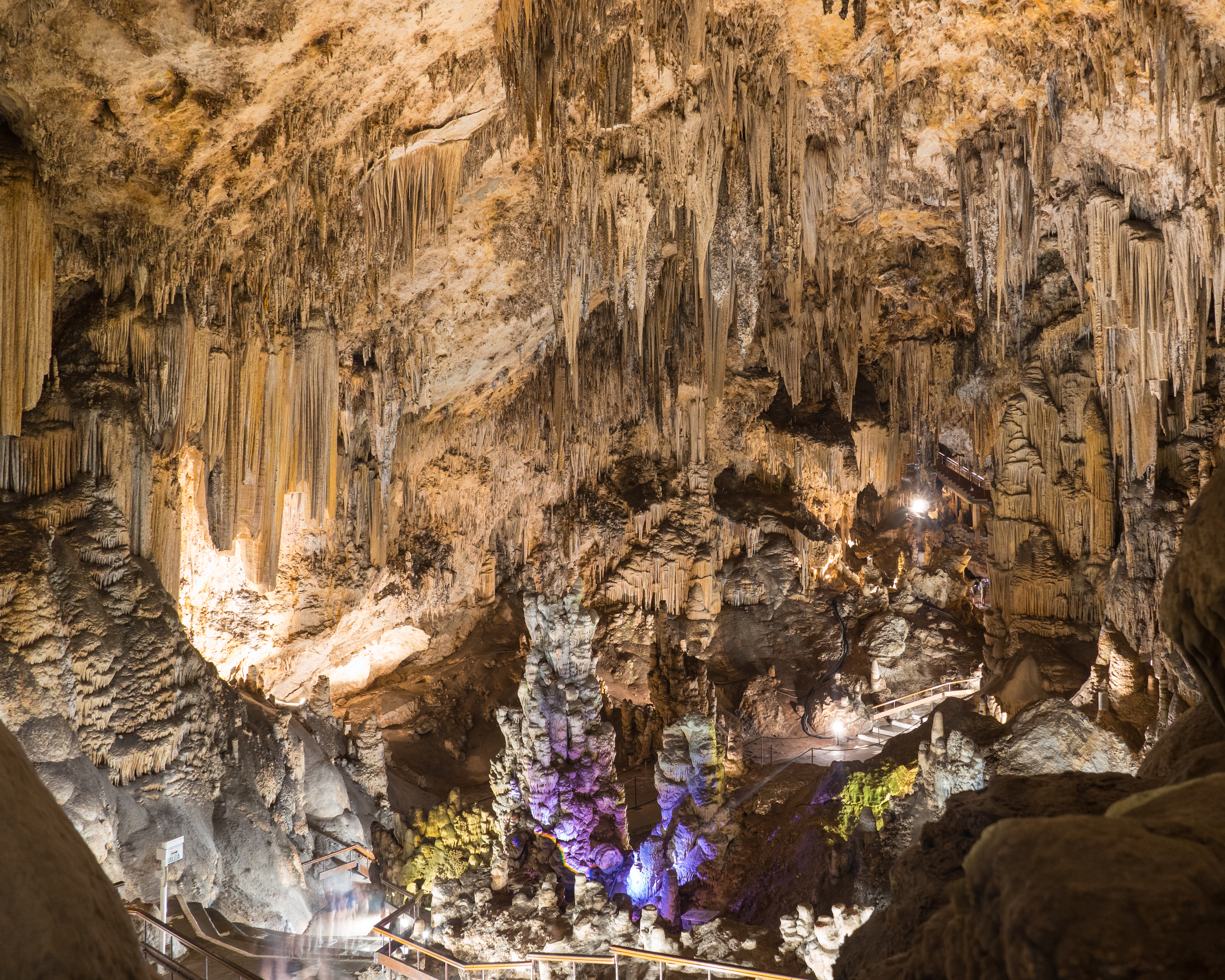
- cave interior

- location in Spain
- 36°45′42″N 3°50′45″W
- Location: Nerja, Province of Málaga

The Caves of Nerja (Spanish: Cueva de Nerja) are a series of caverns close to the town of Nerja in the Province of Málaga, Spain. Stretching for almost 5 kilometres (3.1 mi), the caverns are one of Spain's major tourist attractions. Concerts are regularly held in one of the chambers, which forms a natural amphitheatre.

The caves were re-discovered in modern times on 12 January 1959 by five friends, who entered through a narrow sinkhole known as "La Mina". This forms one of the two natural entrances to the cave system. A third entrance was created in 1960 to allow easy access for tourists, just south of the Sierras of Tejeda, Almijara and Alhama Natural Park. The cave is divided into two main parts known as Nerja I and Nerja II. Nerja I includes the Show Galleries which are open to the public, with relatively easy access via a flight of stairs and concreted pathways to allow tourists to move about in the cavern without difficulty. Nerja II, which is not open to the public, comprises the Upper Gallery discovered in 1960 and the New Gallery discovered in 1969.

In February 2012 it was announced that possibly Neanderthal cave paintings dated in 42,000 years had been discovered in the Caves of Nerja. However, a 2017 study concluded that they actually date to between 18,000 and 20,000 years ago, which would mean that they were actually painted by Homo sapiens, and associated with the Magdalenian culture of the Upper Paleolithic period/Late Pleistocene.

== History ==
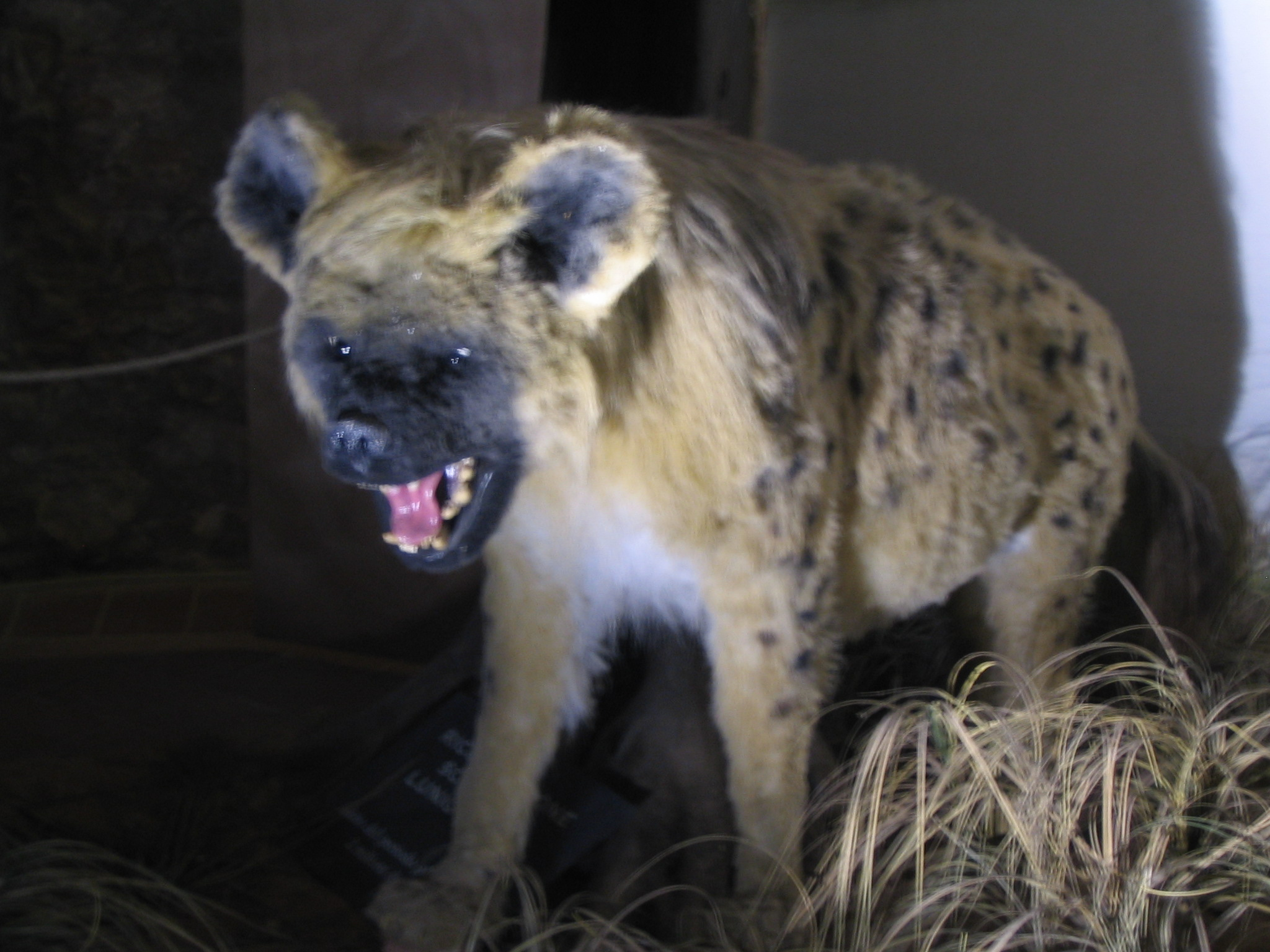
Cave hyena used the cave alongside the earliest human inhabitants.

Approximately 5 million years ago, during the Upper Miocene, water penetrated the fissures of the marble rock and dissolved it, forming a huge cavern. Seismic movement and landslides during the Holocene forced the water to find new pathways through the cave system and began the formation of the giant stalactites and stalagmites that can be seen in the cave.

Skeletal remains found in the caverns indicate that they were inhabited from about 25,000 BC up until the Bronze Age. Cave paintings from the Paleolithic and post-Paleolithic eras have been discovered on the walls of the cave. For about 4,000 years from 25,000 BC the caves were used seasonally by a small group of humans, and were occupied by cave hyena during the periods that the humans were absent. By 21,000 BC the human population had taken up year-round residence in the caves and had increased in number. A culture based on hunting in the local area had evolved, illustrated by first cave paintings found in the cave which date to around the time. Pine nuts and snails were also important elements of the diet. Up until around 10,800 BC the hunting culture continued to develop with more prey species being taken, including goats, rabbits, fish and marine mammals. A wide variety of animal bones, shells and fish bones from this time have been found in the cave, including the remains of a number of offshore species, along with stone and bone tools. By 4500 BC domesticated animals were being kept and the area around the cave was being used for farming and the production of pottery. By 3800 BC textiles and more advanced styles of pottery were being produced and parts of the cave were being used as a burial chamber.

== Galleries ==
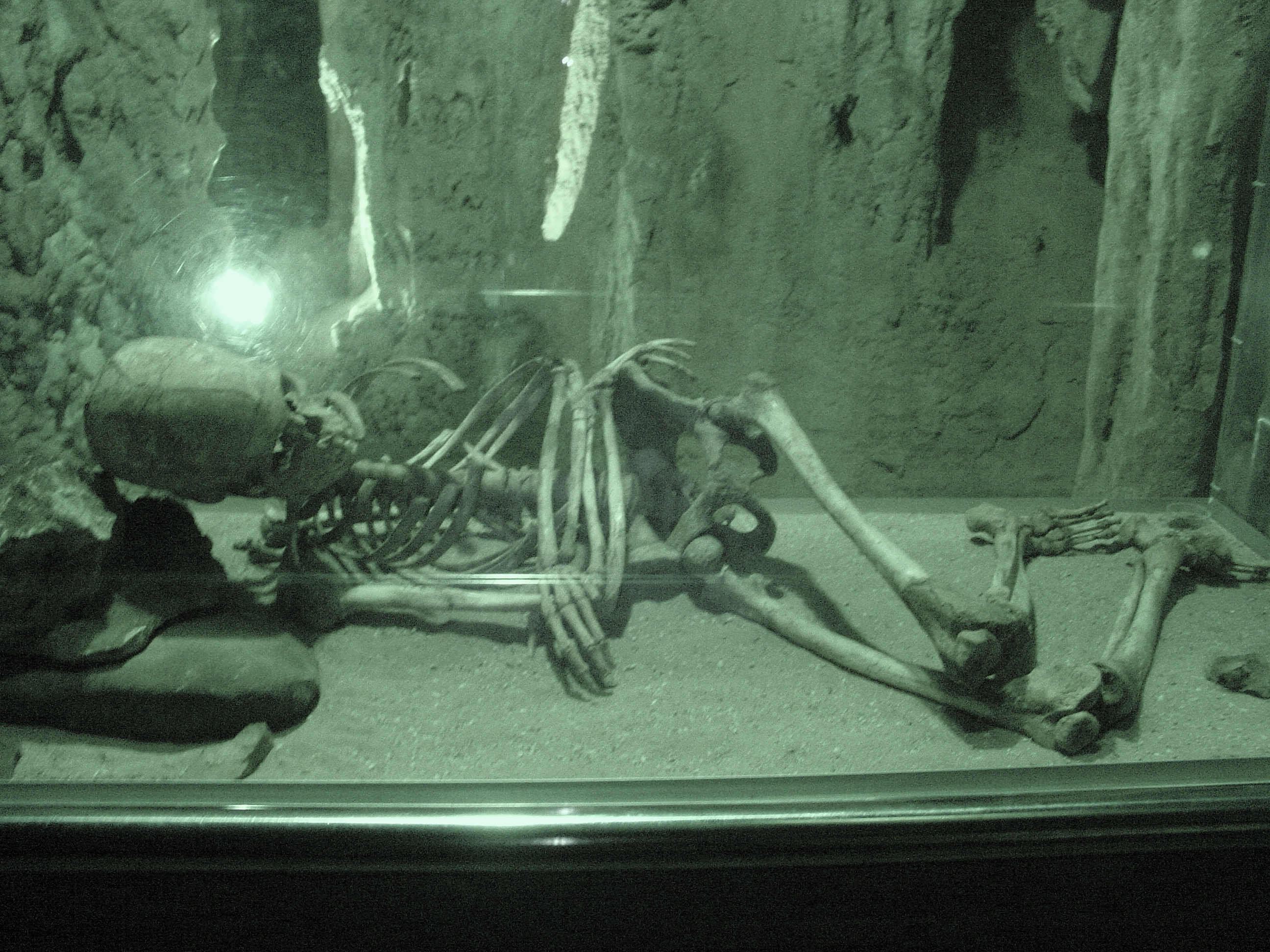
A skeleton found in the caves, now displayed near the entrance.

=== Show Gallery ===
Each of the galleries has a number of halls, areas where the walls, floors or ceilings close in to subdivide the main caverns. The Show Gallery is accessed by an 8 m (26 ft) flight of stairs leading to the Entrance Hall (Sala de Vestibulo) where archaeological excavations took place and where some of the finds are now displayed. Off to one side a passage leads the Mine Hall (Sala de la Mina), and Hall of the Sink (Sala de la Torca) where further archaeological excavations take place. This area is not normally open to the public. Back through the Entrance Hall is the Hall of the Nativity (Sala de Belén) which is filled with columns of calcite. A skeleton recovered from the cave is on display in a glass case in this subsection. From the Entrance Hall a passage called the Hall of the Tusk (Sala del Colmillo) leads down to the Hall of the Waterfall or Ballet (Sala de la Cascada o del Ballet). It is here that concerts and festivals of dance are staged and there are about 100 seats set permanently in the cave. This large cavern has little to separate it from the Hall of the Phantoms (Sala de los Fantasmas) apart from some columns. The Hall of the Phantoms is named after an unusual speleothem. At the end of this cavern is a large rockfall which separates it from the Hall of the Cataclysm (Sala del Cataclismo) which is over 100 m (330 ft) long and dominated by the huge central column which is the biggest in the world, measuring 13 by 7 m (43 by 23 ft) at the base and standing 32 m (105 ft) high. Further down into the hall is the Organ Corner (Rincón del Órgano) where fluted columns can be struck to produce different notes. Some of the columns seem to have been intentionally altered to produce different notes by the prehistoric inhabitants of the cave. High up in the far corner of this cave is the opening which allows access to the Upper and New Galleries.

=== Upper and New Galleries ===
The Upper and New Galleries are each divided into two halls. In the Upper Hall are the Columns of Hercules (Columnas de Hércules) and the Hall of Immensity (Sala de la Inmensidad), while in the New Gallery there are the Hall of the Lance (Sala de la Lanza) and the Hall of the Mountain (Sala de la Montaña). These two areas contain many of the cave paintings, but tourist access is restricted to specialised caving "speleothem tourism".

== Investigations ==
Several expeditions have been made to further explore the caves and its different galleries. In 1969 a narrow passage was discovered in the Hall del Cataclismo, which led to a magnificent find, the so-called high galleries and the new galleries, with spectacular formations and prehistoric remains. It is closed to the public.

The "Fundación Cueva de Nerja" promotes the study and research of the caves, and has formed a scientific committee whose members include geologists, biologists, archaeologists, paleontologists, etc. The Fundación also arranges congresses, photographic studies, improvements in equipment and cultural activities.

In 2012 some organic remains associated with paintings of seals were dated to 42 000 years which could be the first known work of art in the history of humanity.

== Bien de interés cultural ==
The enormous wealth of the Cave of Nerja made it, one year after its opening to tourism, declared Historical Artistic Monument , according to Decree nº 988, of May 25, 1961 and, subsequently, Bien de Interés Cultural, by virtue of the Law 16/1985 of the Spanish Historical Heritage of June 25, 1985.

In 2006, the Cave of Nerja was declared Property of Cultural Interest with the category of Archaeological Zone, according to Decree nº 194, of October 31, 2006.

== See also ==
- Rock art of the Iberian Southern Tip
