= Nerja =

- Municipality and town
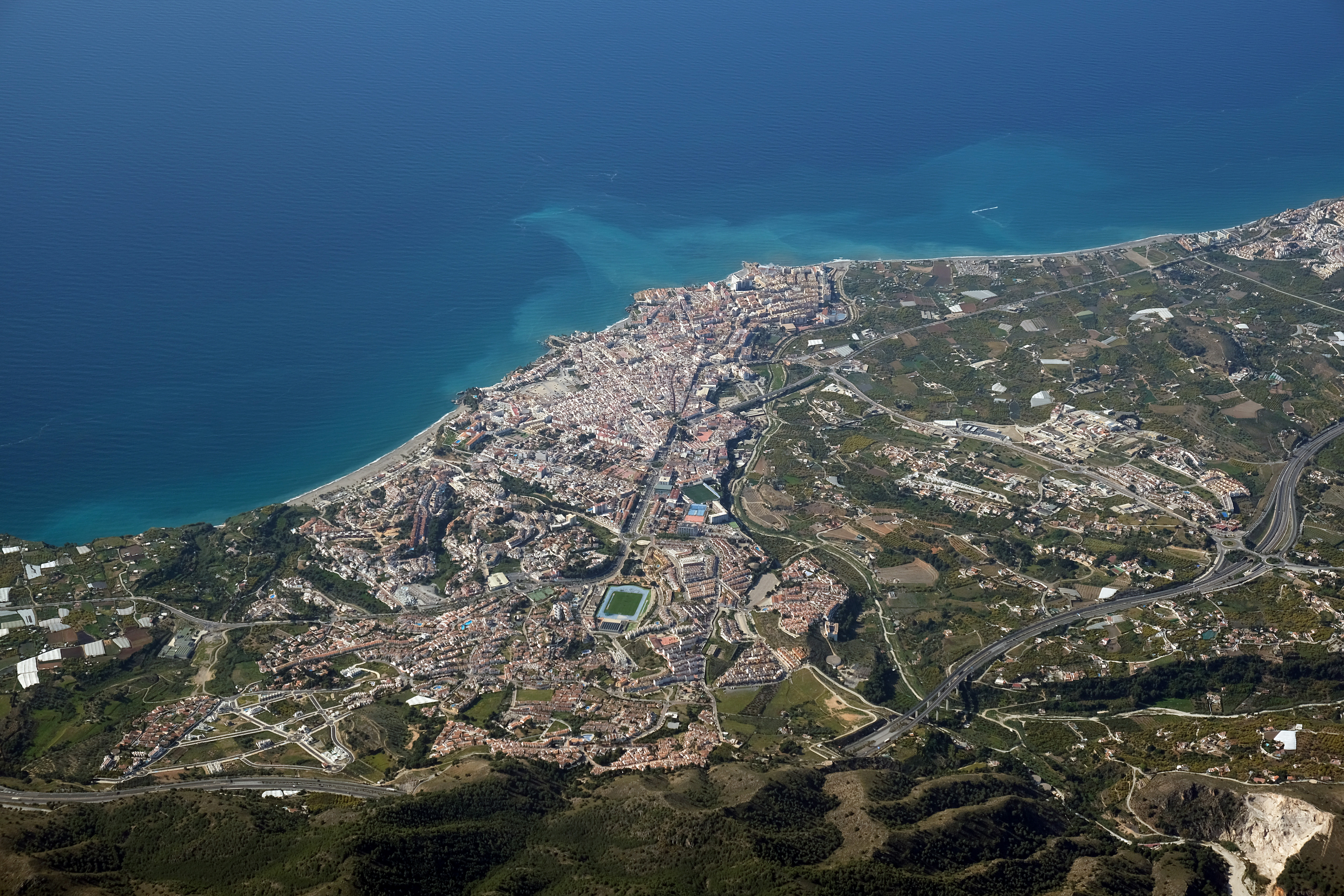

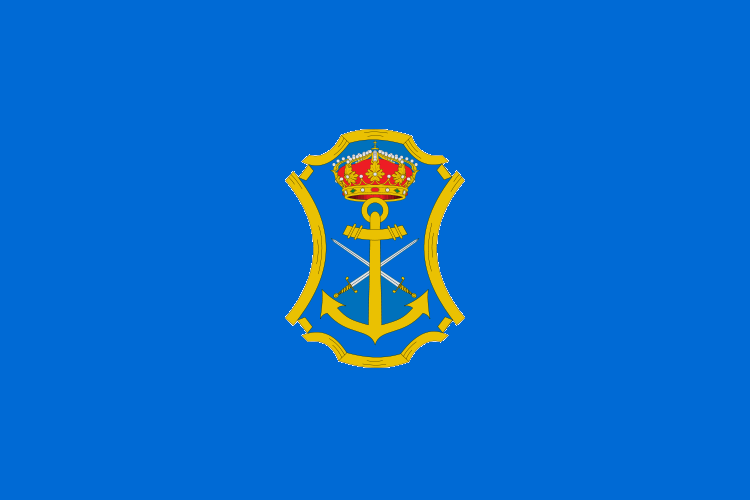
- Flag Coat of arms

- Municipal location in the province of Málaga

- Location of Nerja in Andalusia and Spain Nerja (Andalusia) Nerja (Spain)
- Coordinates: 36°44′49″N 3°52′44″W
- Sovereign state: Spain
- Autonomous community: Andalusia
- Province: Málaga
- Comarca: Axarquía

Government
  - Mayor: José Alberto Armijo

Area
  - Total: 85 km^{2} (33 sq mi)
- Elevation: 26 m (85 ft)

Population (2025-01-01)
  - Total: 22,132
  - Density: 260/km^{2} (670/sq mi)
- Demonym: Nerjeños
- Time zone: UTC+1 (CET)
  - Summer (DST): UTC+2 (CEST)
- Postal code: 29780
- Website: Official website

Nerja (pronounced [ˈneɾxa]) is a municipality on the Costa del Sol in the province of Málaga in the autonomous community of Andalusia in southern Spain. It is part of the comarca of La Axarquía. It is on the country's southern Mediterranean coast, about 50 kilometres (31 mi) east of Málaga.

A popular and widely repeated folk etymology claims the name comes from Arabic for "abundant source", but the Arabic form Nāriŷa itself stems from an unknown pre-Islamic name.

== History ==
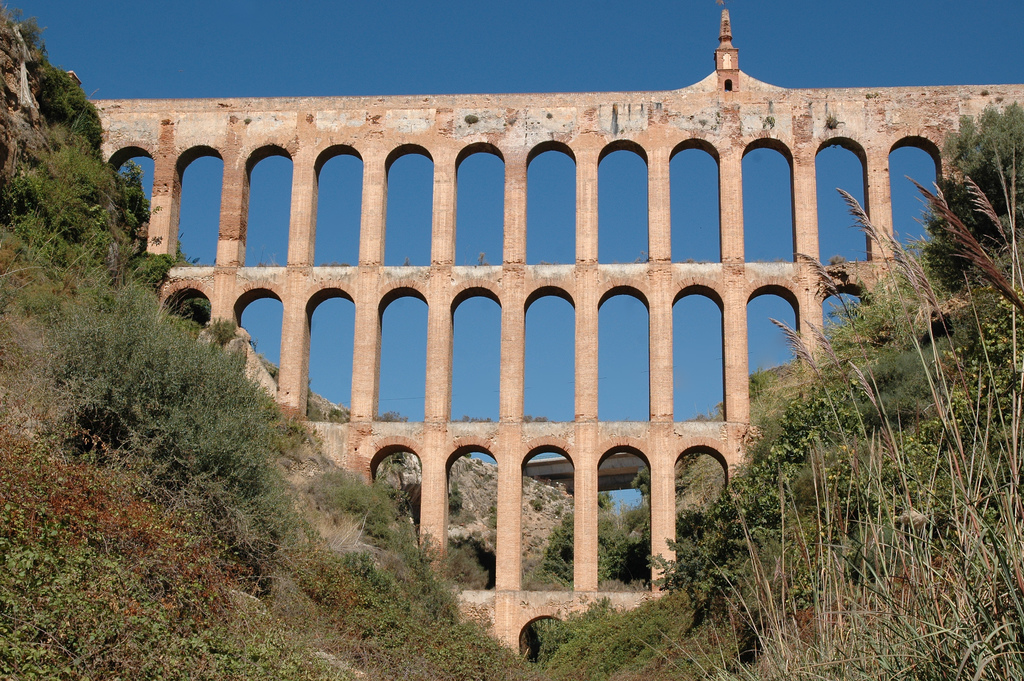
Aqueduct of Nerja

Nerja has been a site of human activity since prehistory, evidenced by the primitive paintings found in its famous Nerja caves, discovered in 1959. These caves are now believed to be just one entrance to a linked series of sinkholes stretching many miles into the mountains between Nerja and Granada, and which may yet prove to be one of the most extensive unexplored systems in Europe.

The Romans built three settlements here, including Detunda, of which now large remains can be seen. The area was later taken over by the Arabs in the early 8th century. Under the Moors, the town was known as Narixa, which means "abundant spring", from which the present name derives.

The Balcón de Europa, a mirador or viewpoint which gives views across the sea, is in the centre of the old town. It was visited in King Alfonso XIIin 1885 following a disastrous earthquake. Local folklore says that he stood upon the site where the Balcón now stands, and said "This is the balcony of Europe". Local archive documents are said to show that its name predated this visit, but this has not prevented the authorities from placing a life-sized (and much photographed) statue of the king implying an origin of the name.

The Balcón area was originally known as La Batería, a reference to the gun battery which existed there in a fortified tower. This emplacement and a similar tower nearby were destroyed during the Peninsular War. In May 1812, the British vessels Hyacinth, Termagant and Basilisk supported Spanish guerrillas on the coast of Granada, against the French. On 20 May, Termagant or Hyacinth opened fire and the forts were destroyed. Two rusty guns positioned at the end of the Balcón are reminders of these violent times. The huge lumps of rock, the remains of La Batería, visible in the sea at the end of the Balcón, are further evidence of this action.

== Main sights ==
- Caves of Nerja
- Sierras of Tejeda, Almijara and Alhama Natural Park
- Navachica, highest peak in the Sierra de Almijara
- Chillar River
- Frigiliana, a village on the nearby mountain that is famous for its sugar cane honey factory
- Torre de Maro, a 16th-century coastal watchtower declared Bien de Interés Cultural, located within the Acantilados de Maro-Cerro Gordo Natural Park.

== Beaches ==
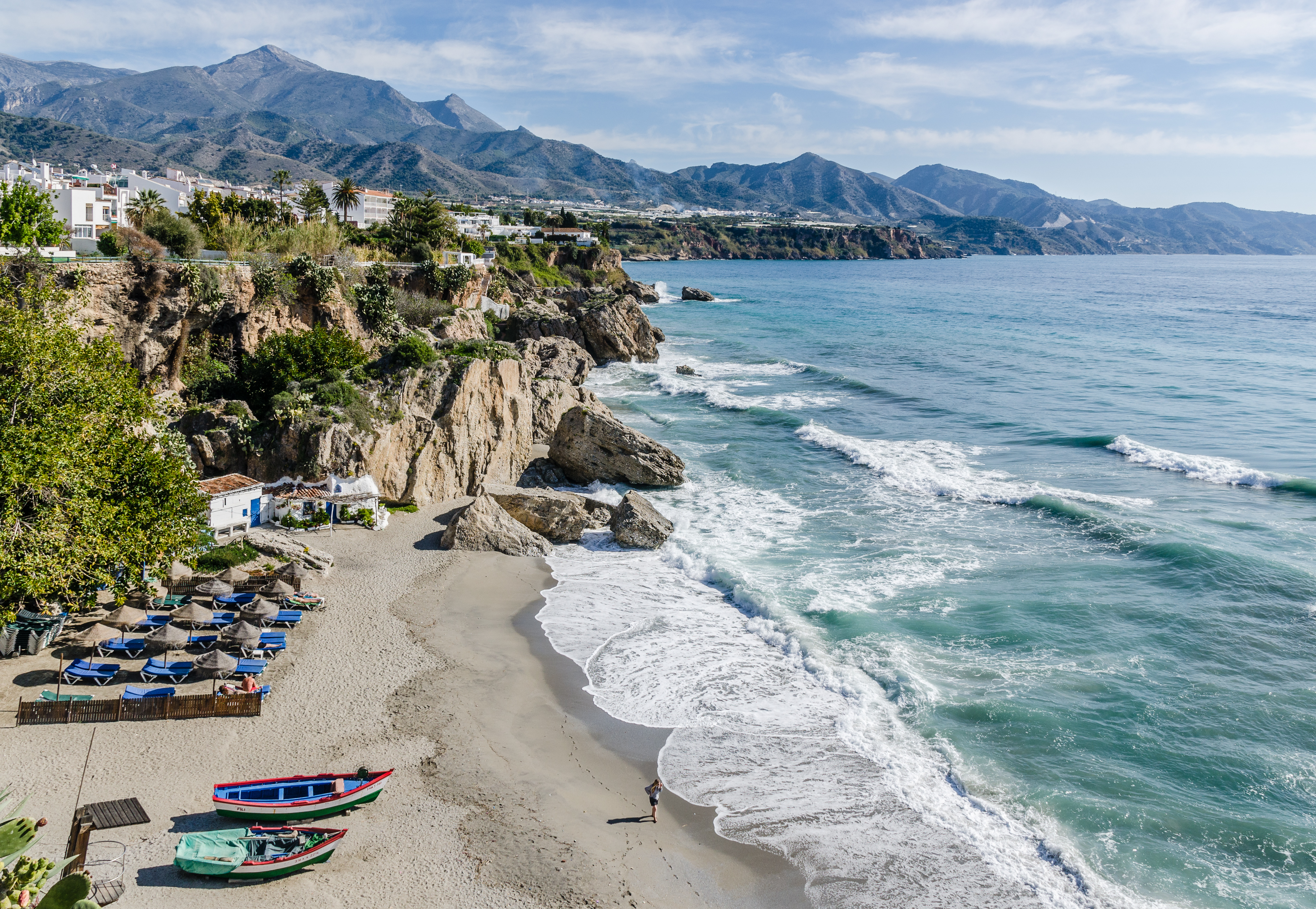
View to the West from Balcon de Europa in Nerja of the beach Playa de la Calahonda

Nerja has some of the best beaches in Costa del Sol. Many have been awarded Blue Flags several times. An example of this is Burriana Beach. The beaches are:

- Burriana
- Carabeillo
- Carabeo
- Chucho
- Torrecilla
- El Salón
- Playazo
- Calahonda
- Caletilla

== Sports ==
Enrique López Cuenca Sports Stadium is a combined Rugby and Athletics stadium, home to the local rugby (union) side Club Nerja Rugby. Local semi-professional soccer team C.D Nerja (Club Deportivo Nerja) used to play at the stadium, but now have a purpose built ground behind the Medico.

== Public transport ==
The closest airport to Nerja is Malaga-Costa del Sol Airport (AGP), which is 45 minute drive via A-7.

Nerja is not integrated in the Málaga Metropolitan Transport Consortium.

As well as two local bus routes, around town (from the Riú Mónica Hotel), there are buses from the top of the High Street by the Alsa ticket office to Málaga, Caves of Nerja, Frigiliana, Maro, Almuñécar, Vélez-Málaga, Torre del Mar, Granada, Córdoba, Seville, Almería and Motril.

== Media ==
The town has a commercial Spanish-language pop radio station, Radio Nerja.

== Climate ==
Nerja has a Mediterranean climate with mild winters (8 °C–17 °C) and hot, dry summers (20 °C–30 °C). Winters are wetter, while summers are sunny with little rain. Average sunshine is 5–11 hours per day, depending on the season.

== Twin towns ==
- Pescia, Italy
- San Juan, Argentina
- Torremolinos, Spain

== Popular impact ==
Nerja has been a source of inspiration for expatriate writers and artists, such as Scottish novelist Joan Lingard and French-born author André Launay; Jorge Guillén and Federico García Lorca were long-time visitors and residents of the town. The town was also the main setting for the filming of Verano azul (translated as Blue Summer), a popular Spanish television series later exported to several countries. A replica of the boat featured in the series can be found in a park of the same name as the series, near the centre of town.

In October 2005, two episodes of the British television soap opera Emmerdale were set in Spain, featuring the characters of Eric Pollard, Carl King, and the Dingle family. Filming took place in Nerja. Broadcast in November that year, the second episode was an hour-long special, and acknowledged the town on the end credits.

== Notable people ==
- Nuria Fergó, Spanish actress (born 1979)
- Miguel de Miguel, Spanish actor (born 1975)
- Ruth Núñez, Spanish actress (born 1979)
- Ouassim Oumaiz, Spanish long-distance runner (born 1999)

== See also ==
- Verano azul – Spanish TV series
- List of municipalities in Málaga
