= Kosovo at the European Championships =

- WA code: KOS
- NOC: Olympic Committee of Kosovo
- Website: http://www.noc-kosovo.org/
- Medals: Gold 0 Silver 0 Bronze 0 Total 0

European Championships appearances (overview)
- 2018; 2022

Kosovo has competed in the European Championships since the inaugural event in 2018.

== Medal count ==
Games	Athletes	Gold	Silver	Bronze	Total
(United Kingdom) / (Germany) 2018 Glasgow and Berlin (details)	6	0	0	0	0
(Germany) 2022 Munich (details)	6	0	0	0	0
Total		0	0	0	0

== See also ==
- Kosovo at the Olympics
- Kosovo at the Youth Olympics
- Kosovo at the European Games
- Kosovo at the Mediterranean Games
- Kosovo at the Universiade
- Sport in Kosovo
