= Kosovo at the 2017 World Championships in Athletics =

- WA code: KOS

in London
- Competitors: 1 (1 man) in 1 event
- Medals: Gold 0 Silver 0 Bronze 0 Total 0

World Championships in Athletics appearances
- 2015; 2017; 2019; 2022; 2023

Other related appearances
- Yugoslavia (1983–1991); Serbia and Montenegro (1998–2005); Serbia (2007–2013)

Kosovo competed at the 2017 World Championships in Athletics in London, United Kingdom, from 4–13 August 2017.

== Results ==
(q – qualified, NM – no mark, SB – season best)

=== Men ===
Track and road events

Athlete	Event	Heat		Semifinal		Final	
Athlete	Event	Result	Rank	Result	Rank	Result	Rank
Astrit Kryeziu	800 metres	1:49.94	39	Did not advance			
