= Vijona Kryeziu =

Kosovan sprinter

Personal information
- Born: 8 October 1997 (age 28)
- Height: 1.67 m (5 ft 6 in)
- Weight: 51 kg (112 lb)

Sport
- Country: Kosovo
- Sport: Athletics

Vijona Kryeziu (born 8 October 1997) is a Kosovan sprinter. She competed at the 2016 Summer Olympics in Rio de Janeiro, in the women's 400 metres. She was the flag bearer for Kosovo in the closing ceremony.
