= Kate Lajtha =

Ecologist

- Born: 1957 (age 68–69)
- Education: Duke University
- Scientific career
- Thesis: The biogeochemistry of phosphorus cycling and phosphorus availability in a desert ecosystem (1986)

Kate Lajtha is an ecologist known for her use of stable isotopes to examine biogeochemical cycling in soils.

== Education and career ==
Lajtha has a B.A. in biology from Harvard University (1979) and earned her Ph.D. from Duke University in botany in 1986. Following her Ph.D., she was a postdoctoral fellow at Ohio State University before joining Boston University in 1987. In 1996 she moved to Oregon State University where she was promoted to Professor in 2010. Lajtha has been Editor-in-Chief of the journal Biogeochemistry since 2002.

Lajtha was elected a fellow of the American Geophysical Union in 2020, and recognized "for sustained impact on long-term soil carbon research and fundamental biogeochemical processes of soil carbon and nitrogen cycling."

== Research ==
While at Boston University, Lajtha investigated the physiology saguaro cactus and the potential impact of trace elements on saguaros. While she concluded that natural, abiotic factors were causing the death of these cacti, the general public was interested in the research because of the emblematic nature of saguaro cacti in the southwestern United States.

More recently, Lajtha's research centers on nutrient cycling, especially nitrogen, in natural environments and those impacted by humans. In this venue she has examined the input of nitrogen and its attenuation in the environment and examined the availability of nitrogen to different types of plants. She has also worked on the ecology of soil carbon with a particular focus on the impact of detritus on soil organic matter. Lajtha works at the H.J. Andrews Experimental Forest in Oregon where she leads a study entitled "Detrital Input and Removal Treatment (DIRT), through which undergraduate researchers can participate in research on the role of soils in capturing carbon from the atmosphere.

=== Selected publications ===
- Howarth, R. W.; Billen, G.; Swaney, D.; Townsend, A.; Jaworski, N.; Lajtha, K.; Downing, J. A.; Elmgren, R.; Caraco, N.; Jordan, T.; Berendse, F.; Freney, J.; Kudeyarov, V.; Murdoch, P.; Zhao-Liang, Zhu (1996). "Regional nitrogen budgets and riverine N & P fluxes for the drainages to the North Atlantic Ocean: Natural and human influences". Nitrogen Cycling in the North Atlantic Ocean and its Watersheds. pp. 75–139. doi:10.1007/978-94-009-1776-7_3. ISBN 978-94-010-7293-9. S2CID 54538868.
- Lajtha, Kate; Michener, Robert H. (1994). Stable isotopes in ecology and environmental science. Blackwell Scientific Publications. ISBN 0632031549.
- Lajtha, Kate; Schlesinger, William H. (1988). "The Biogeochemistry of Phosphorus Cycling and Phosphorus Availability Along a Desert Soil Chronosequence". Ecology. 69 (1): 24–39. Bibcode:1988Ecol...69...24L. doi:10.2307/1943157. ISSN 1939-9170. JSTOR 1943157.
- Valiela, Ivan; Foreman, Kenneth; LaMontagne, Michael; Hersh, Douglas; Costa, Joseph; Peckol, Paulette; DeMeo-Andreson, Barbara; D'Avanzo, Charlene; Babione, Michele; Sham, Chi-Ho; Brawley, John; Lajtha, Kate (December 1992). "Couplings of Watersheds and Coastal Waters: Sources and Consequences of Nutrient Enrichment in Waquoit Bay, Massachusetts". Estuaries. 15 (4): 443. doi:10.2307/1352389. JSTOR 1352389. S2CID 83501004.
- Lajtha, K.; Crow, S. E.; Yano, Y.; Kaushal, S. S.; Sulzman, E.; Sollins, P.; Spears, J. D. H. (November 2005). "Detrital Controls on Soil Solution N and Dissolved Organic Matter in Soils: A Field Experiment". Biogeochemistry. 76 (2): 261–281. Bibcode:2005Biogc..76..261L. doi:10.1007/s10533-005-5071-9. S2CID 67833715.

== Awards and honors ==
- Murray F. Buell Award for Excellence in Ecology (1996)
- Co-recipient of the John Martin Award, Association for the Sciences of Limnology and Oceanography (2018) for Howarth et al. paper
- Fellow, American Geophysical Union (2020)
