= Musa Hajdari =

Kosovan middle-distance runner

Personal information
- Nationality: Kosovan
- Born: 11 October 1987 (age 38) Kosovska Kamenica, SR Serbia, SFR Yugoslavia (now Kamenica, Kosovo)
- Height: 1.85 m (6 ft 1 in)
- Weight: 77 kg (170 lb)

Sport
- Sport: Track
- Events: 800 meters, 1500 meters, mile

Achievements and titles
- Personal bests: 800 meters: 1:47.70; 1500 meters: 3:48.73
- Updated on August 25, 2015

Musa Hajdari (born 11 October 1987) is a Kosovan middle-distance track athlete who specializes in the 800 meters. He represented Kosovo at the 2015 World Championships in Athletics. He holds multiple Kosovan records.

== Running career ==
On June 1, 2013, Hajdari made his first major international debut at the Yilmaz Sazak Memorial track meet in Istanbul, where he won the men's mile in 4:17.73. On May 1, 2015, Hajdari placed second overall behind Dušan Babić in the men's 1500 meters at the International Meeting in Bar, Montenegro.

== Competition record ==
| Year | Competition | Venue | Position | Event | Notes |
Representing Kosovo
| 2015 | World Championships | Beijing, China | 21st (h) | 800 m | 1:47.70 |
| 2016 | Championships of the Small States of Europe | Marsa, Malta | 1st | 800 m | 1:48.43 |
| 2016 | European Championships | Amsterdam, Netherlands | 11th (h) | 800 m | 1:48.97 |
| 2016 | Olympic Games | Rio de Janeiro, Brazil | 34th (h) | 800 m | 1:48.41 |
| 2017 | Jeux de la Francophonie | Abidjan, Ivory Coast | 6th | 1500 m | 3:52.93 |
| 2018 | World Indoor Championships | Birmingham, United Kingdom | 15th (h) | 1500 m | 3:47.68 |
| 2018 | Championships of the Small States of Europe | Schaan, Liechtenstein | 1st | 800 m | 1:49.26 |
| 2018 | Mediterranean Games | Tarragona, Spain | 13th (h) | 800 m | 1:51.26 |
| 2018 | European Championships | Berlin, Germany | 30th (h) | 800 m | 1:49.47 |
| 2019 | World Championships | Doha, Qatar | 35th (h) | 800 m | 1:47.98 |
| 2021 | Championships of the Small States of Europe | Serravalle, San Marino | 2nd | 800 m | 1:51.47 |
| 2021 | Olympic Games | Tokyo, Japan | 43rd (h) | 800 m | 1:48.96 |
