= Kosovo Athletic Federation =

Governing body for athletics in Kosovo

- Sport: Athletics
- Abbreviation: FAK
- Affiliation: World Athletics
- Regional affiliation: EAA
- Headquarters: Pristina
- President: Halil Sylejmani
- Secretary: Andurrahman Shkodra

Official website
- fakosova.org
- (Kosovo)

The Kosovo Athletic Federation (Albanian: Federata e Atletikës së Kosovës; Serbian: Атлетски савез Косова / Atletski savez Kosova) is the governing body for the sport of athletics in Kosovo.

The Kosovo Athletic Federation admitted to IAAF as a provisional member "with full rights and obligations" on 15 April 2015 and granted full membership on 19 August 2015 with 187 members voting in favour and 13 against.

== Affiliations ==
- World Athletics
- European Athletic Association (EAA)
- Olympic Committee of Kosovo

== National records ==
FAK maintains the Kosovan records in athletics.

== See also ==
- Kosovo at the World Athletics Championships
- Kosovo at the European Athletics Championships
