= Gresa Bakraçi =

Kosovar middle-distance runner

Personal information
- Born: 11 September 1995 (age 30)

Sport
- Sport: Athletics
- Event: Middle-distance running

Achievements and titles
- Personal bests: 800m: 2:07.67 (2023) NR; 1500m: 4:17.57 (2025) NR; 3000m: 9:17.80 (2025) NR; 5000m: 16:50.24 (2025) NR; 3000m S'chase: 10:42.39 (2023) NR; Indoor; 800m: 2:09.53 (2022) NR; 1500m: 4:23.01 (2024) NR; 3000m: 9:31.15 (2026) NR; Road; 10k 35:32 (2022); Half marathon 1:17:24 (2022) NR
Medal record
Women's athletics
Representing Kosovo
Balkan Championships
Silver medal – second place	2025 Volos	3000 m
Bronze medal – third place	2025 Volos	5000 m
Bronze medal – third place	2024 İzmir	3000 m

Gresa Bakraçi (born 11 September 1995) is a Kosovar middle-distance runner. She has represented Kosovo at multiple major championships, including the 2024 Olympic Games. She is a multiple-time national record holder.

== Biography ==
From Peja, Bakraçi set new Kosovo national records competing indoors over 800 metres and 1500 metres in February 2022 in Zagreb, Croatia. That month, she ran 1:17:24 for the half marathon in Split, Croatia. The following month, she competed over 1500 metres at the 2022 World Athletics Indoor Championships in Belgrade, Serbia.

That year, Bakraçi ran a new personal best for the 1500 metres of 4:20.56. She represented Kosovo at the 2022 World Athletics Championships in Eugene running 4:22.77 for the 1500 metres, and the 2022 European Athletics Championships in Munich, Germany, where she ran 4:38.16.

Competing over 3000 metres, she represented Kosovo at the 2023 European Athletics Indoor Championships in Istanbul, Turkey, completing the race in 9:36.96. In August, she ran in the 1500 metres at the 2023 World Athletics Championships in Budapest, Hungary, without completing the race.

Bakraçi won the bronze medal over 3000 metres at the 2024 Balkan Athletics Championships in İzmir, Turkey in May 2024. In August, she competed over 800 metres at the 2024 Olympic Games in Paris, France, and was eliminated following the repechage round.

Bakraçi won the silver medal over 3000 metres, and the bronze medal over 5000 metres, setting a new 5000m national record, at the 2025 Balkan Athletics Championships in Volos, Greece. Bakraçi was the sole Kosovar participant at the 2025 World Athletics Championships in Tokyo, Japan, where she ran 4:22.06 in the 1500 metres, without advancing to the semi-finals.

In March 2026, she competed over 1500 metres at the 2026 World Athletics Indoor Championships in Toruń, Poland. In August, she competed at the 2026 European Athletics Championships in Birmingham, England, in the 5000 metres.
