= 1562 =

1562 in various calendars
- Gregorian calendar: 1562; MDLXII
- Ab urbe condita: 2315
- Armenian calendar: 1011; ԹՎ ՌԺԱ
- Assyrian calendar: 6312
- Balinese saka calendar: 1483–1484
- Bengali calendar: 968–969
- Berber calendar: 2512
- English Regnal year: 4 Eliz. 1 – 5 Eliz. 1
- Buddhist calendar: 2106
- Burmese calendar: 924
- Byzantine calendar: 7070–7071
- Chinese calendar: 辛酉年 (Metal Rooster); 4259 or 4052 — to — 壬戌年 (Water Dog); 4260 or 4053
- Coptic calendar: 1278–1279
- Discordian calendar: 2728
- Ethiopian calendar: 1554–1555
- Hebrew calendar: 5322–5323
- Hindu calendars
- Vikram Samvat: 1618–1619
- Shaka Samvat: 1483–1484
- Kali Yuga: 4662–4663
- Holocene calendar: 11562
- Igbo calendar: 562–563
- Iranian calendar: 940–941
- Islamic calendar: 969–970
- Japanese calendar: Eiroku 5 (永禄５年)
- Javanese calendar: 1481–1482
- Julian calendar: 1562; MDLXII
- Korean calendar: 3895
- Minguo calendar: 350 before ROC 民前350年
- Nanakshahi calendar: 94
- Thai solar calendar: 2104–2105
- Tibetan calendar: ལྕགས་མོ་བྱ་ལོ་ (female Iron-Bird); 1688 or 1307 or 535 — to — ཆུ་ཕོ་ཁྱི་ལོ་ (male Water-Dog); 1689 or 1308 or 536

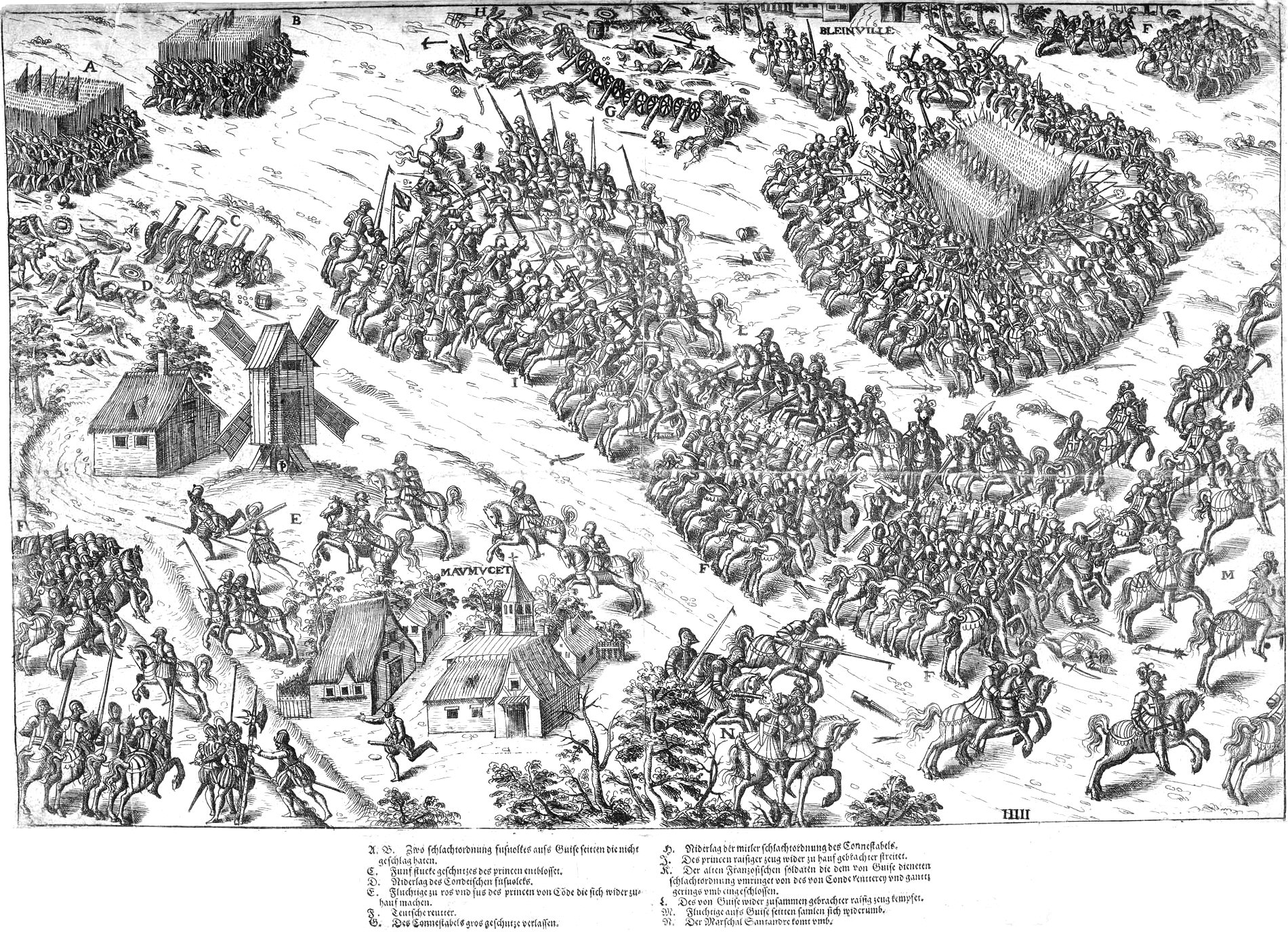
December 19: Battle of Dreux

Year 1562 (MDLXII) was a common year starting on Thursday of the Julian calendar.

== Events ==
=== January–March ===
- January 6 – Shane O'Neill of Tír Eoghain pleads his cause at the Palace of Whitehall in London, before Queen Elizabeth I of England, who recognises his status. He returns to Ireland on May 26, and resumes his rebellious activities by November.
- January 17 – Huguenots are recognized under the Edict of Saint-Germain.
- January 18
  - The Council of Trent reconvenes, after a gap of 10 years.
  - Thomas Norton and Thomas Sackville's play Gorboduc is performed for the first time, before Queen Elizabeth I of England. It is the first known English tragedy, and the first English language play to employ blank verse.
- February 6 – In the Mughal Empire in India, the Emperor Akbar marries Mariam-uz-Zamani, daughter of Raja Bharmal, the ruler of the Kingdom of Amber. The marriage takes place in Sambhar in what is now the state of Rajasthan, where Akbar has stopped on his way back to the Mughal capital of Agra.
- February 12 – After Catherine of Austria, the former Queen Consort of Portugal decides to step down as regent for her grandson, the 8-year-old King Sebastian at the age of 55, she turns the responsibility over to her late husband King João III's younger brother, Cardinal Henrique de Aviz.
- February 18 – The siege of the Portuguese fort of Mazagan begins in Morocco as the Sultanate tries to take back control of the area from the Portuguese occupiers.
- March 1 – Over 80 Huguenots are massacred by the ultra-Catholic François, Duke of Guise in Wassy-sur-Blaise, triggering the First War of Religion in France.
- March 4 – Prince Abu Abdallah Mohammed II Saadi, heir to the throne of the Sultanate of Morocco, arrives at Mazagan with 100,000 troops.
- March 15 – English merchant Anthony Jenkinson has an audience with Ivan the Terrible in Moscow, before departing the city on April 27 and continuing his second expedition through the Grand Duchy of Moscow to Qazvin, capital of the Safavid dynasty in Persia.
- March 24 – Portuguese Navy Captain Álvaro de Carvalho reaches Mazagan in Morocco with a relief force that includes 600 well-equipped troops. Another force of 1,565 volunteers arrives on March 26 from Lisbon.

=== April–June ===
- April 2 – Civil war breaks out in the Kingdom of France as Louis I, Prince of Condé, leader of the Protestant Huguenots, declares war against the French Catholic rulers, in retaliation for the March 1 massacre of Vassy. Condé and Gaspard de Coligny seize control of Orléans, and other uprisings follow throughout France.
- May 1 – Jean Ribault, French navigator, lands in Florida, and later establishes a Huguenot colony at Charlesfort on Parris Island, South Carolina.
- May 5 – Prince Abdullah of Morocco withdraws his troops after seeing no way to overcome Portuguese defenses at Mazagan.
- May 28 – The Siege of Rouen as Claude, Duke of Aumale, leads 3,000 French government troops against the Huguenot fortress at Rouen. The siege lasts for five months. He orders a retreat in June but returns on 29 July with a larger force and heavier artillery.
- June 10 – English Catholic printer Thomas Somerset is jailed at Fleet Prison "for translating an oratyon out of Frenche, made by the Cardinall of Lorraine, and putting the same without authority in prynte." On June 27, he is summoned before the Lords of the Council for a parole hearing, but is turned down because "he seamed to go about to justifye his cause" and returned to Fleet, "there to remaine until he shall have better considered of himself." He remains imprisoned for more than 19 years before finally being released on February 28, 1582.
- June 14 – At dinner at Dunfermline Castle, Mary, Queen of Scots, displays a gold ring set with a heart shaped diamond from her collection and declares that she will send it to Queen Elizabeth of England as a gift and a possible summit conference in the future.
- June 17 Full moon of Waso 924 ME– King King Bayinnaung of Burma establishes an army garrison at Dawei in preparation for an attack against the Siamese Kingdom of Ayutthaya.

=== July–September ===
- July 12 – Fray Diego de Landa, acting Bishop of Yucatan, burns the sacred books of the Maya.
- August 3 – A severe hailstorm causes serious damage in the German town of Wiesensteig, and leads a few days later to the demand of Mayor Ulrich von Helfenstein for the arrest of several women on charges of practicing witchcraft. Six of the women are executed, the first of 63 women and men put to death after being convicted of practicing sorcery.
- August 7 – The Treaty of Mozhaysk is signed between Denmark and Russia to avoid going to war against each other over the Kingdom of Livonia, now divided into Estonia and Latvia.
- August 24 – In the French city of Bar-sur-Seine, at least 300 Huguenots are massacred by Catholic soldiers after their success in reconquering the citadel there. The killing occurs nine days after the burning alive of 94 Huguenots at Lauzerte.
- September 20 – The Treaty of Hampton Court, between Queen Elizabeth I of England and Huguenot leader Louis I, Prince of Condé, is signed.
- September 22 – Maximilian, son of the Emperor Ferdinand I, succeeds Ferdinand as ruler of the Kingdom of Bohemia (now the Czech Republic).

=== October–December ===
- October 4 – English forces under Ambrose Dudley, 3rd Earl of Warwick, land at Le Havre to aid the Huguenots against the French Crown.
- October 19 – La Herradura naval disaster: Twenty-five ships sink in a storm off of the coast of Spain in the bay of La Herradura, where 28 ships had been anchored to weather the elements. At least 3,000 people are killed, and perhaps as many as 5,000, while another 2,000 survivors, mostly slaves on the galleys, are able to escape to shore.
- October 26 – Rouen is captured by Royalist forces under King Antoine of Navarre, who is mortally wounded.
- October – Privateer John Hawkins undertakes the first of several slave trading voyages, attacking Portuguese slave ships off the West African coast and forcibly transporting the enslaved Africans onboard to Spanish colonies in the Americas to sell. Hawkins arrives at the island of Hispaniola in the Spanish West Indies, where he illicitly sells the enslaved Africans to local colonists, as his presence is technically in violation of Spanish law.
- November 5 – Battle of Corrichie in Scotland: The rebellion of George Gordon, Earl of Huntly is crushed by James Stewart, 1st Earl of Moray.
- November 20 – Maximilian of Bohemia is elected King of the Romans.
- December 19 – Battle of Dreux: Huguenot and Catholic forces fight a bloody battle, narrowly won by the Catholic side. The official leaders of both armies are captured in the battle.

=== Date unknown ===
- Mughal Emperor Akbar conquers Malwa, and its last Sultan, Baz Bahadur, flees.
- Dudley Grammar School is established, and Gresham's School is granted a royal charter, in England.
- Fausto Sozzini publishes Brevis explicatio in primum Johannis caput, originating Socinianism.
- Giacomo Barozzi da Vignola publishes Regola delli cinque ordini d'architettura (Rules of the Five Orders of Architecture); in succeeding centuries it will become the most published book in architectural history.
- The Pünte at Wiltshausen, a small, hand-operated ferry, which becomes a historic monument in the late 20th century, is first recorded.
- The Portuguese army is defeated at the Battle of Mulleriyawa, Sri Lanka, at the hand of the Sitawaka army commanded by Prince Tikiri Bandara (King Rajasinghe), leaving 1600 dead. This is considered the worst defeat the Portuguese have suffered up to this time.
- An arsenal in Paris explodes. As recorded by Ambroise Paré in The Workes of Ambrose Parey: "In the yeare of our Lord 1562, a quantity of this pouder [gunpowder] which was not very great, taking fire by accident in the Arcenall of Paris, caused such a tempest that the whole city shook, but it quite overturned many of the neighboring houses, and shook off the tiles and broke the windows of those which were further away; and to conclude, like a storm of lightning, it laid many here and there for dead, some lost their sight, others their hearing, and others their limbs were torn apart as if they had been rent with wild horses" (p.415).

== Births ==
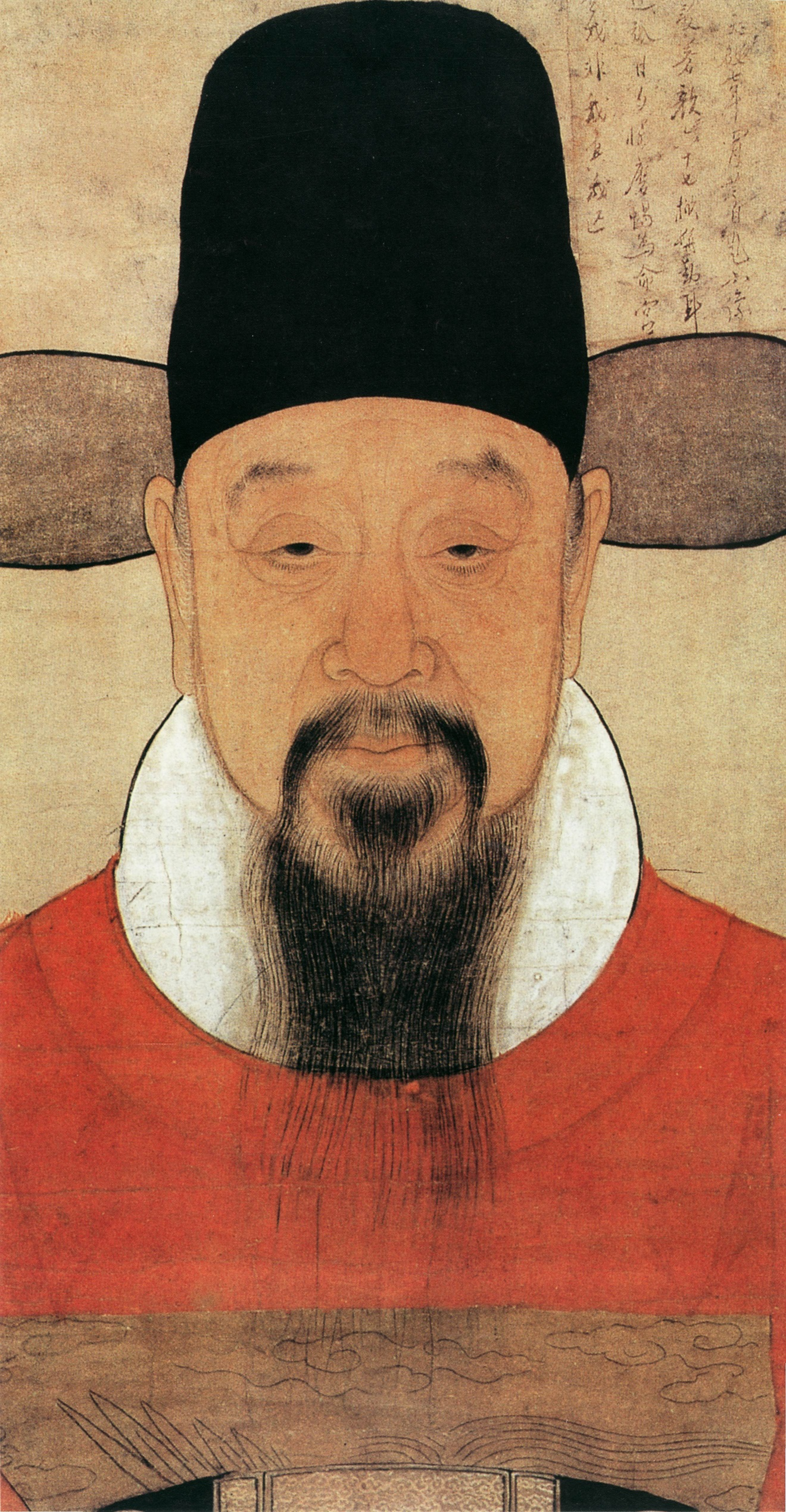
Xu Guangqi

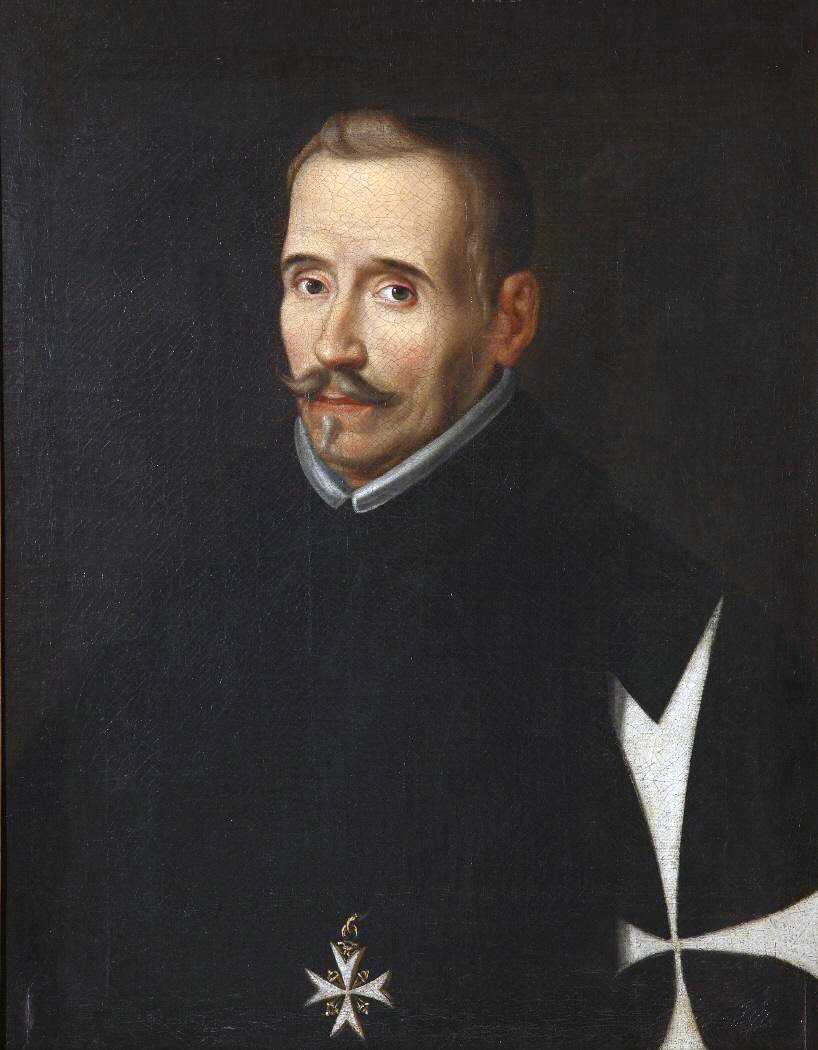
Lope de Vega

- January – Edward Blount, English publisher (d. 1632)
- January 12 – Charles Emmanuel I, Duke of Savoy (d. 1630)
- January 20
  - Maria of Hanau-Münzenberg, German noblewoman (d. 1605)
- February 15
  - Maeda Toshinaga, Japanese daimyō (noble) (d. 1614)
- April or May – Jan Pieterszoon Sweelinck, Dutch composer (d. 1621)
- April 21 – Valerius Herberger, German theologian (d. 1627)
- April 24 – Xu Guangqi, Ming Dynasty Chinese politician, agronomist, astronomer, mathematician and lay Catholic leader (d. 1633)
- April 25 – Friedrich Wilhelm I, Duke of Saxe-Weimar, German noble (d. 1602)
- May 6 – Pietro Bernini, Italian sculptor (d. 1629)
- May 26 – James III, Margrave of Baden-Hachberg (d. 1590)
- May 28 – John William, Duke of Jülich-Cleves-Berg (d. 1609)
- June 24 – Duke François de Joyeuse, French churchman and politician (d. 1615)
- June 26 – Anne of Ostfriesland, German noble, Electress Palatine (d. 1621)
- July 25 – Katō Kiyomasa, Japanese samurai (d. 1611)
- August 17 (bapt.) – Hans Leo Hassler, German composer (d. 1612)
- August 19 – Charles II de Bourbon-Vendôme, French cardinal (d. 1594)
- September 1 – George, Count of Nassau-Dillenburg (1607–1620) and (1620–1623) (d. 1623)
- September 21 – Vincenzo Gonzaga, Duke of Mantua and Montferrat (1587–1612) (d. 1612)
- September 24 – Ercole, Lord of Monaco, Monegasque noble (d. 1604)
- October 4 – Christian Sørensen Longomontanus, Danish astronomer (d. 1647)
- October 19 – George Abbot, Archbishop of Canterbury (d. 1633)
- November 25 – Lope de Vega, Spanish poet and dramatist (d. 1635)
- December 10 – Roger de Saint-Lary de Termes, French noble (d. 1646)
- December 14 – Sir Lionel Tollemache, 1st Baronet, English baronet (d. 1621)
- December 18 – Philipp Dulichius, German composer (d. 1631)
- date unknown
  - Isabella Andreini, Italian actress (d. 1604)
  - John Bull, English composer (d. 1628)
  - Samuel Daniel, English poet and historian (d. 1619)
  - Francis Godwin, English writer and bishop (d. 1633)
  - George Gordon, 1st Marquess of Huntly, Scottish noble (d. 1636)
  - Natsuka Masaie, Japanese daimyō (noble) (d. 1600)
  - Paulo Miki, Japanese Catholic saint and martyr (d. 1597)
  - Richard Neile, English bishop (d. 1640)
  - Henry Spelman, English antiquary (d. 1641)
  - Cornelis van Haarlem, Dutch painter (d. 1638)

== Deaths ==
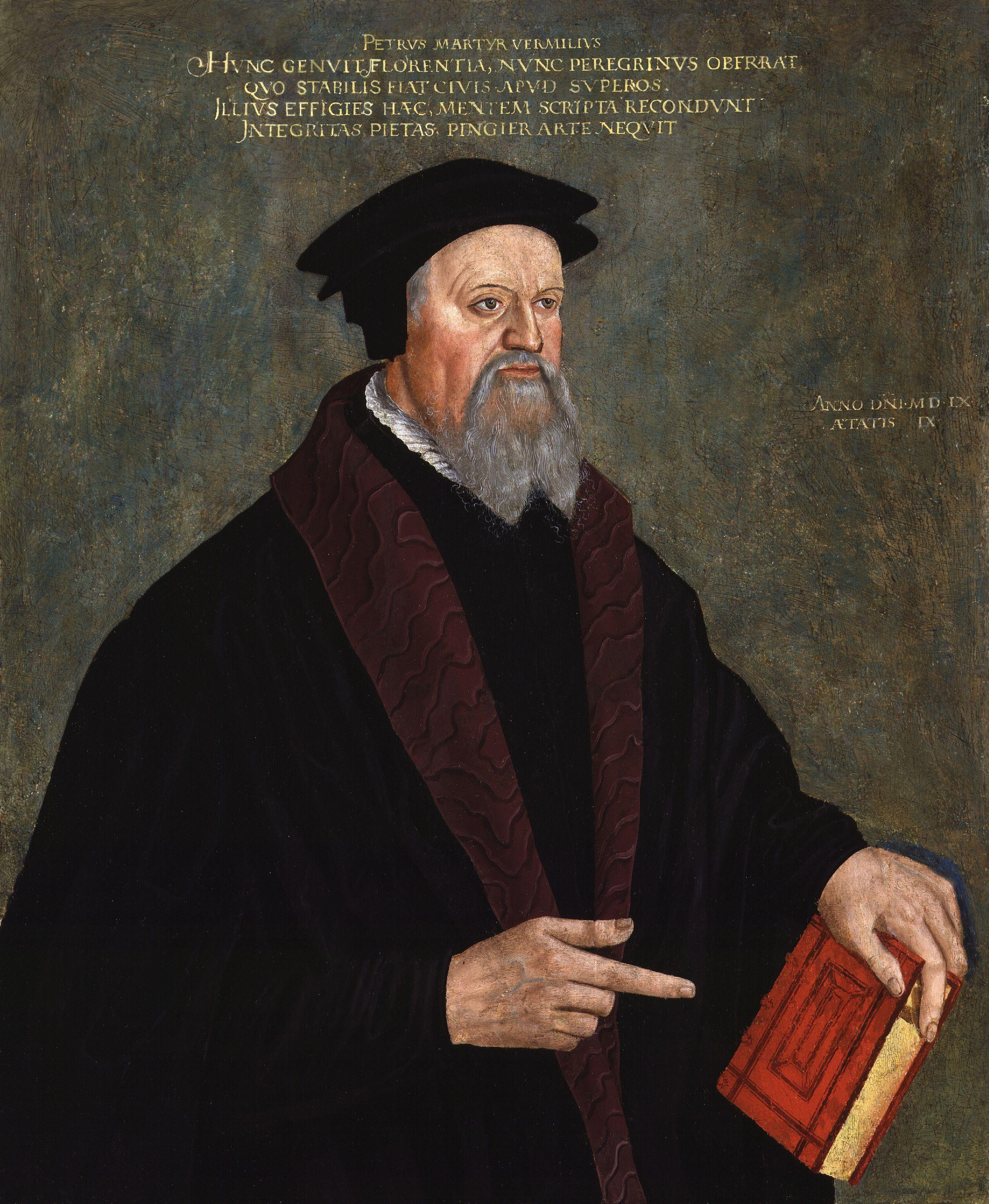
Peter Martyr Vermigli

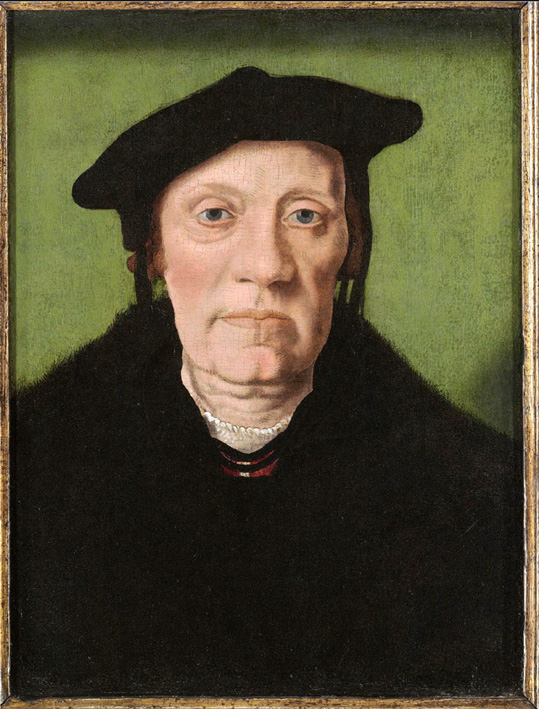
Cornelis Aerentsz van der Dussen by Jan van Scorel Panel, Weiss Gallery, London

- January – Prince Ilie II Rareş of Moldavia (b. 1531)
- January 9 – Amago Haruhisa, Japanese samurai and warlord (b. 1514)
- January 25 – Charles Wriothesley, English officer of arms (b. 1508)
- February 3 – Georg Giese, German merchant (b. 1497)
- May 4 – Lelio Sozzini, Italian Protestant theologian (b. 1525)
- July 1 – Wilhelm IV of Eberstein, German President of the Reichskammergericht (b. 1497)
- July 4 – Johann Hommel, German astronomer and mathematician (b. 1518)
- July 23 – Götz von Berlichingen, German knight and mercenary (b. 1480)
- September 5 – Katharina Zell, German Protestant reformer (b. 1497)
- October – George Gordon, 4th Earl of Huntly (b. 1514)
- October 9 – Gabriele Falloppio, Italian anatomist (b. 1523)
- October 13 – Claudin de Sermisy, French composer (b. 1495)
- October 18 – Anne d'Alençon, French noblewoman (b. 1492)
- November 7 – Maldeo Rathore, Rao of Marwar (b. 1511)
- November 12 – Peter Martyr Vermigli, Italian theologian (b. 1500)
- November 17 – King Antoine of Navarre, father of Henry IV of France (b. 1518)
- November 20 – Giovanni de' Medici, Italian Catholic cardinal (b. 1544)
- December 6
  - Jan van Scorel, Dutch painter (b. 1495)
  - Garzia de' Medici, Italian noble (b. 1547)
- December 7 – Adrian Willaert, Flemish composer (b. c. 1490)
- December 13 – Francesco Marinoni, Italian Catholic priest (b. 1490)
- December 17 – Eleonora di Toledo, Grand Duchess of Tuscany (b. 1522)
- December 27 – Joachim of Münsterberg-Oels, Duke of Münsterberg, Duke of Oels, Count of Kladsko, Bishop of Brandenburg (b. 1503)
- date unknown
  - Cristóbal de Guzmán Cecetzin, Tlatoani of Tenochtitlan and Governor of San Juan Tenochtitlan
  - Matteo Bandello, Italian novelist (b. 1480)
