= Sexi =

Sexi may refer to:

- Sexi (Phoenician colony)
- SNOBOL was originally called SEXI
