= Maro–Cerro Gordo Cliffs Natural Park =

Land and sea between Cerro Gordo

Coordinates: 36°44′51″N 03°48′09″W

The Maro–Cerro Gordo Cliffs Natural Park is an area of land and sea between Cerro Gordo, the headland at the western end of La Herradura, a seaside resort on Spain's Costa Tropical. It is on the south-west coast of the province of Grenada, 70 kilometres east of Málaga, and part of the borough of Almuñécar, in Andalusia.

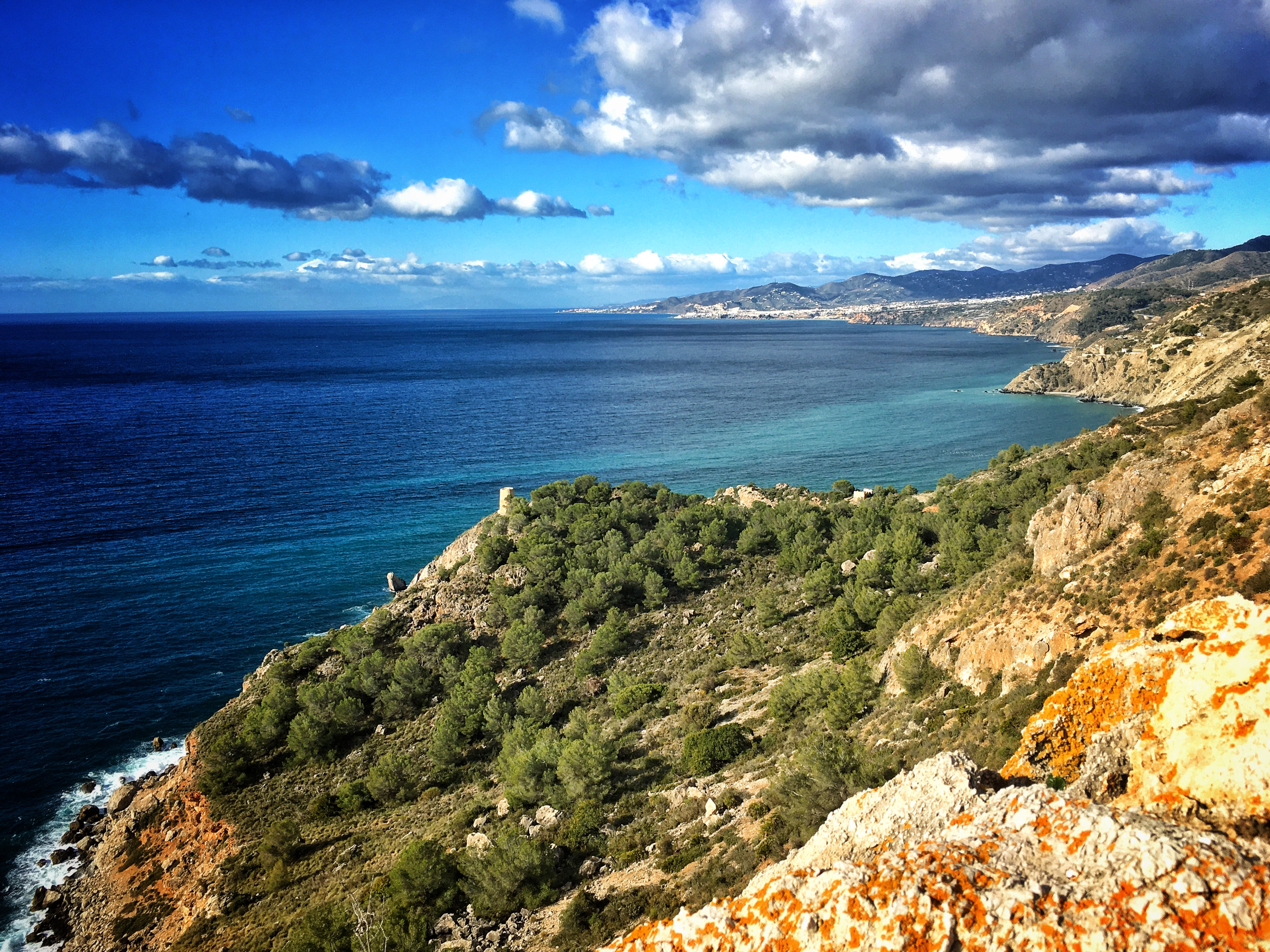
Maro-Cerro Gordo Natural Park, Andalusia

Both the land and the seabed, which preserves rare corals and endangered species, were declared a Natural Landscape in the 1980s by the Autonomous Government of Andalusia. The flora along the cliffs includes Mediterranean pines, carob, juniper, boxwood, olive and palm trees, while the fauna is most notable for numbers of wild mountain goats, Iberian Ibex.

There are various coastal hiking trails of varying lengths and difficulty. The reserve is a major attraction for La Herradura's many scuba diving centres and also draws large numbers of nature photographers and birdwatchers.

Motor-powered vessels are prohibited from the beaches, cliffs or coves of the park. Personal water craft ("jet-skis") are also banned from all parts of the Protected Natural Area.
