= Pünte =

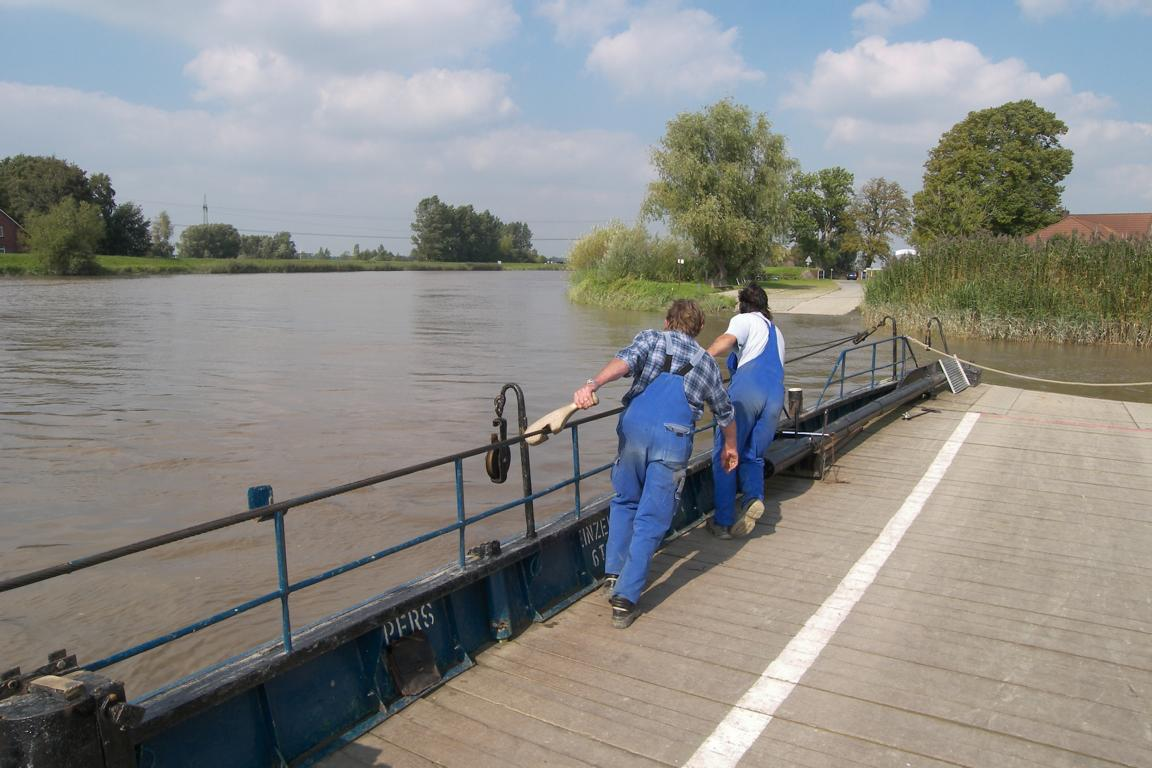
The pünte at Wiltshausen near Leer in East Frisia

A pünte (plural: pünten) is the German term for a type of non-motorised river boat and thus a special type of flat-bottomed boat. It is propelled manually using a crank or hauled by horses on the shore. Today pünten are used almost exclusively as ferries.

== History ==
Pünten were built from wood. They had a flat bottom and the sides sloped only slight outwards. Pünten were often fitted with a sail, although this was usually insufficient for propulsion, so that the boat was mostly hauled as well. A horse was transported on board for this purpose, which had to be put ashore when the boat came to stretches of river that required the boat to be hauled.

== Pünten today ==
After centuries of decline, several pünten are again in operation in Germany in East Frisia and the Emsland. For example the Leher Pünte, the only sail-driven ferry over the navigable Ems, crosses the river near Lehe and, near the Großes Meer in the East Frisian municipality of Südbrookmerland pünten are used at two points along a cycleway.

The oldest operational hand-operated ferry in Central Europe is the pünte in Wiltshausen, which crosses the Jümme at its confluence with the Leda.
