= Castle of San Miguel, Almuñécar =

Castle in Granada, Spain

Coordinates: 36.730833°N 3.6925°W

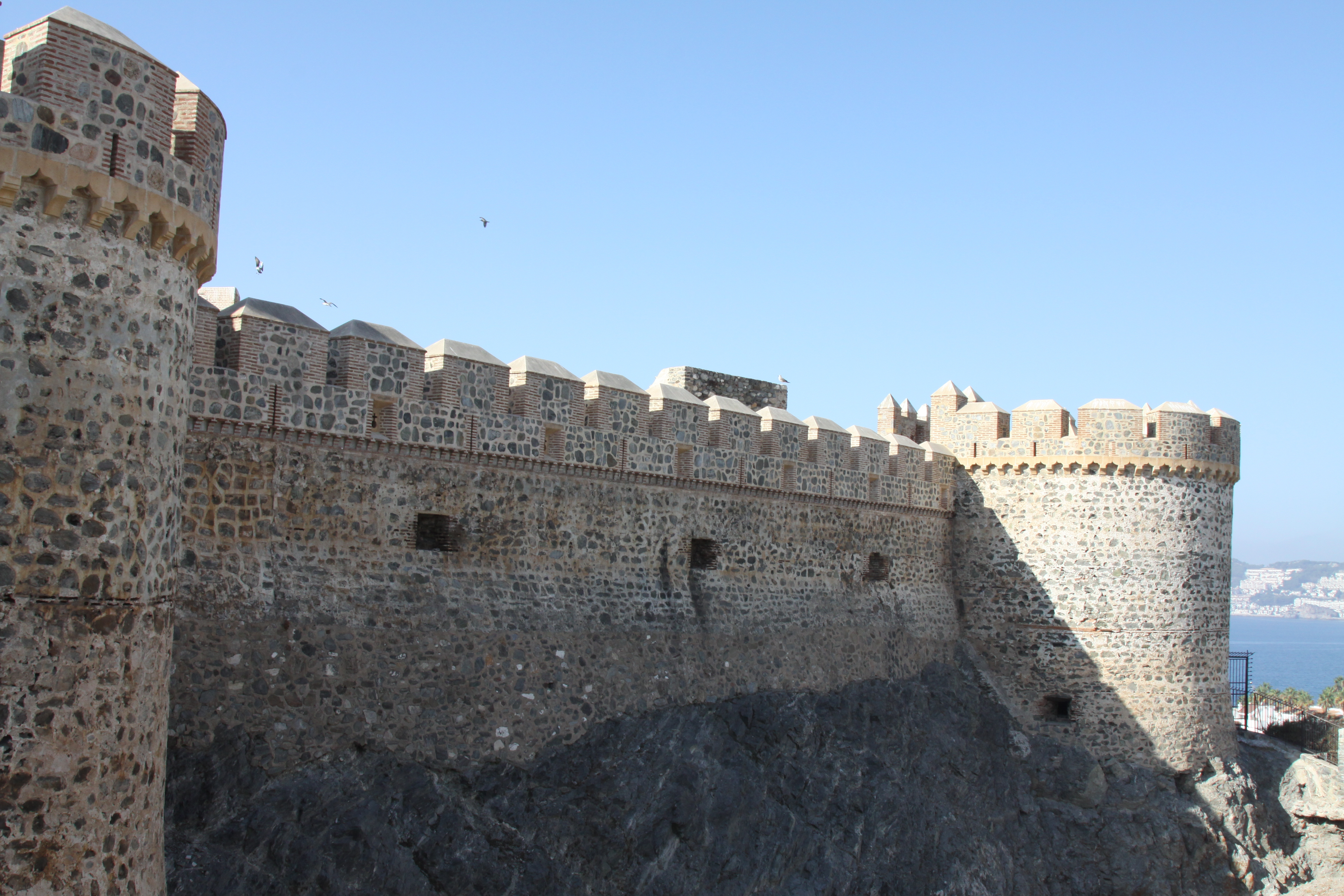
Castillo de San Miguel

Castillo de San Miguel is a castle located in Almuñécar, in the province of Granada, Spain. It is bounded by the remains of the original city walls. The castle sits on a small hill, which is difficult to access. The original fortifications date of 1st century BC. During the Moorish occupation, the castle was enlarged to include 40 towers and three gates. It has a wide moat and a drawbridge. Parts of the building are topped with battlement of pyramid shape. The keep, which was on the inside, is demolished. It was declared a Bien de Interés Cultural monument in 1993. There is a small museum within the castle grounds.
