= Sexi (Phoenician colony) =

Phoenician colony

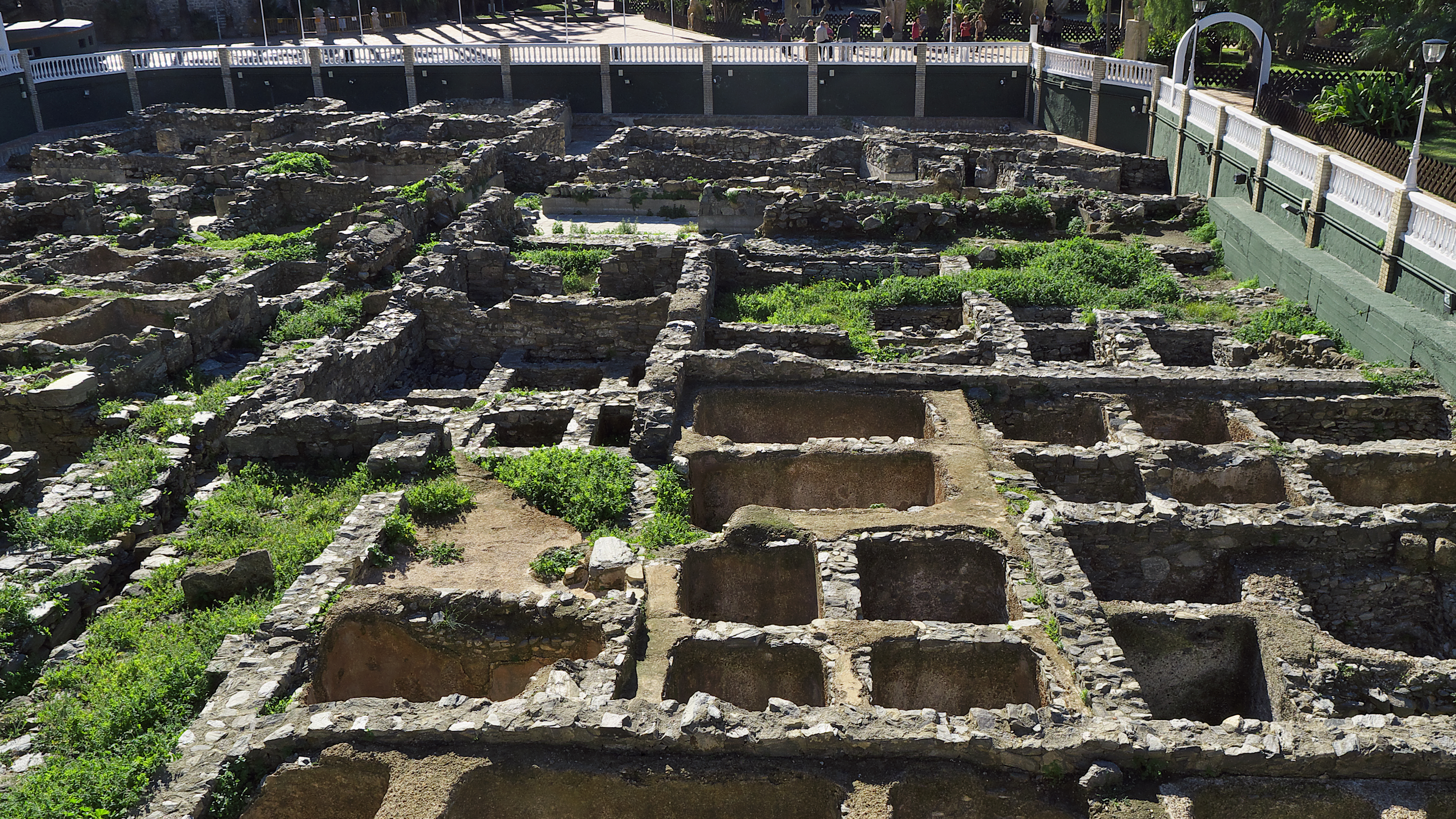
- Basins of a garum factory (Firmun Lulium Sexi).

- Location in the Province of Granada Location in Andalusia Location in Spain
- 36°44′N 3°41′W
- Location: Almuñécar, Spain
- Region: Andalusia
- Part of: Phoenician colonies

History
- Built: 3rd century BC
- Abandoned: 2nd century BC

Sexi (Punic: 𐤑𐤊𐤑, ṣkṣ), also known as Ex, was a Phoenician colony at the present-day site of Almuñécar on southeastern Spain's Mediterranean coast.

The Roman name for the place was Sexi Firmum Iulium. Alternative transcriptions of the Phoenician name of the city in Latin include Secks, Seks, Sex, Eks, Seksi and Sexsi.

== History ==
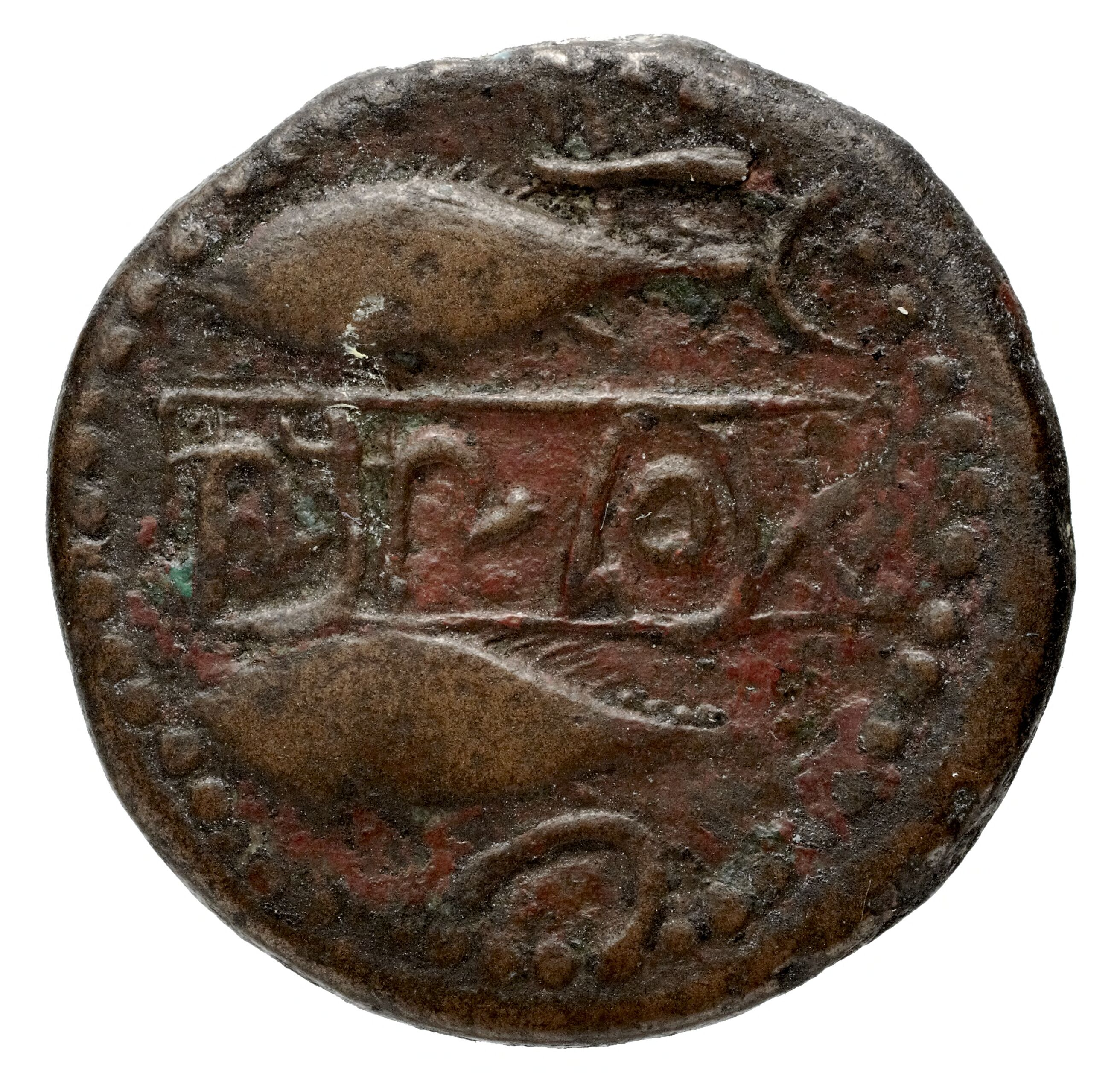
A Punic coin of Sexi

The ancient Phoenician settlement, whose earliest phases are unclear, was located southwest of the Solorius Mons (the modern Sierra Nevada mountain range). From the 3rd-2nd centuries BC it issued a sizable corpus of coinage, with many coins depicting the Phoenico-Punic god Melqart on the obverse and one or two fish on the reverse, possibly alluding to the abundance of the sea and also a principal product of the area. The Barrington Atlas of the Greek and Roman World equates ancient Sexi with modern Almuñécar.
