= La Herradura naval disaster =

The La Herradura Naval Disaster took place on October 19, 1562 in the bay of La Herradura, Almuñécar, Spain. A major storm sank 25 ships out of a fleet of 28 sheltering in the bay, and some 5,000 people were drowned.

King Philip II of Spain had gathered a fleet in Málaga to relieve Spanish-held Oran, which was under siege by the Ottoman Empire.

On October 18, 28 galleys, loaded with supplies, soldiers and their families, set sail under the command of Juan de Mendoza y Carrillo, Captain General of the Galleys of Spain.

A strong easterly storm blew up, so Mendoza took shelter in La Herradura Bay. This is a horseshoe-shaped bay, opening towards the south-west, and he had safely anchored there several times before in similar conditions. However, on the morning of October 19 the wind direction unexpectedly changed to blow from the south and the storm turned into a cyclone. Despite efforts to beach the ships, high winds and waves threw them onto each other and the rocks of the Punta de la Mona headland.

Of the 28 galleys, 25 sank and between 3,000 and 5,000 people died. The surviving ships were La Soberana, Mendoza and San Juan on the seaward side of the fleet that were blown eastward around Punta de la Mona into more sheltered waters.

Some 2,000 people rescued themselves by swimming ashore. Many of them were naked galley slaves who were unburdened by the boots, clothing and armour of the sailors and soldiers but who then survived harsh months of winter weather and starvation before being recaptured.

This was a further blow for the Spanish Navy, which had just suffered a defeat in the Battle of Djerba. Nevertheless, Oran and Mers El Kébir were successfully defended against the Ottomans.

In 1604, author Miguel de Cervantes – who himself fought aboard galleys in the Battle of Lepanto – referred to the event in his book Don Quixote:

[...] who was the daughter of Don Alonso de Marañón, knight of the habit of Santiago who was drowned in La Herradura [...]

— Don Quixote, chapter 31, part 2

A plaque with this quote can be found near the town's Saint Joseph’s church.

A monument on La Herradura’s seafront commemorates the tragedy. Erected in 1990, it is by Granada-based sculptor Miguel Moreno.

== Sources ==
- Naufrágio en La Herradura
- La Herradura Monument
- El naufrágio del Capitano
