= La Herradura =

Seaside resort in Granada Province, Spain

Coordinates: 36°44′05″N 3°44′16″W

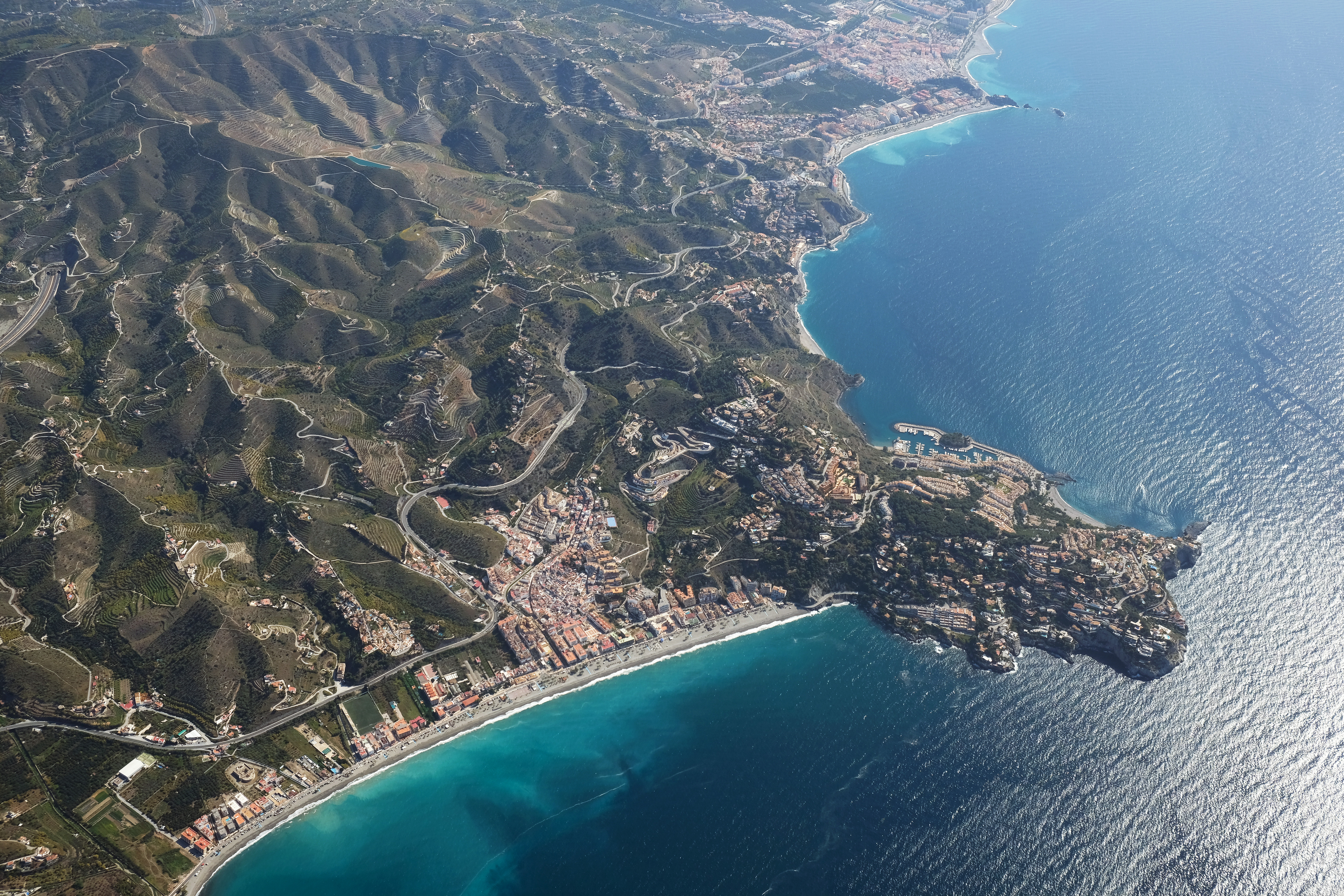
Aerial view of La Herradura

La Herradura is a coastal town on Spain's Costa Tropical, part of the borough of Almuñécar, in the province of Granada, Andalucía. It is on Granada's south-western coast, 70 kilometres east of Málaga.

== History ==
La Herradura's first settlers have been dated to prehistoric times. Several tombs with remains of bronze weapons were found in El Pago de la Mezquita in the 19th century. In 1950 another similar, but better documented, discovery in El Sapo was dated to the 15th century BCE.

There are vestiges of habitation from Roman times, in places such as in the country house de la Argentina, in the ravine of Las Tejas, and in the construction of the old road from Málaga to Almería. There are also the remains of a hermitage or rural mausoleum of Byzantine design from the sixth century AD in the upper course of the river Jate.

More information is available post-dating the Umayyad conquest of Hispania, such as the existence of a farmhouse called "Sät" or "Xat". Abd al-Rahman I arrived in La Herradura in 755 from Damascus, prior to the foundation of the Califato de Córdoba. The area was the scene of a battle in the Muwallad revolt in the 9th century. The raisins exported from this [Al-Andalus] region were considered the best in the Islamic world at this time.

The watchtower of Punta de la Mona, restored in the 18th century and now serving as the base for a lighthouse, dates from the Nasrid period. It was part of a chain of watchtowers running along the coast that were rebuilt in the late 16th century to guard against corsairs. Cerro Gordo has a similar 10.5-meter-high tower that was part of this warning system, using smoke signals during the day and fire at night.

In 1764, Charles III of Spain ordered the construction of nine fortresses along this coast and La Herradura castle was finished in 1768. This defensive system of forts and towers was reinforced before the Peninsular War. French forces later took La Herradura castle before guerilla soldiers under the Mayor of Otivar recaptured it. It served as the barracks of the Carabineros and then the Civil Guard before becoming a cultural centre, used for concerts and similar events. Originally on the seafront, the castle now stands well back from the shore because of sea-level changes.

On 19 October 1562, 25 Spanish galley warships from a fleet of 28 sank in La Herradura Bay in the La Herradura naval disaster, with the loss of up to 5,000 of those aboard. A monument on La Herradura's seafront commemorates the tragedy. Erected in 1990, it is by Granada-based sculptor Miguel Moreno.

In the 19th century, several families of Italian fishermen settled in La Herradura.

During the 20th century the rapid growth in tourism experienced throughout Spain caused major changes in La Herradura. In modern times, there has been a call by a small group for separation from the municipality of Almuñécar, without any success to date.

== Geography ==
La Herradura is on the Spanish shore of the Mediterranean, standing on the horseshoe-shaped bay from which it takes its name ("La herradura" is Spanish for horseshoe). Its two-kilometre-long sand and pebble beach is divided into several parts by rocky promontories and a river outlet. An unusual feature of Playa La Herradura are its stands of palm trees. Behind the beach is the main street, Paseo Andrés Segovia, lined with cafés, restaurants, bars, shops and apartments.

The older town of La Herradura was built with typical whitewashed Andalucian houses on the steep sides of a wadi of the same name running down to the eastern side of the beach. As the settlement has grown from a fishing village into a tourist resort, more modern developments have spread along both sides of the bay and into the surrounding hills.

It is the most western coastal urban area of the province of Granada and borders the town of Maro, in the district of Nerja. Inland is the Sierra de la Almijara, popular for hiking.

La Herradura is the only coastal town in Granada with an indigenous nature reserve. The Maro–Cerro Gordo Cliffs Natural Park is a small area of natural flora and fauna between Cerro Gordo, the headland at the western end of La Herradura Bay, and the town of Maro. Both the land and the seabed, which preserves corals and endangered species, were declared a Natural Site in the 1980s by the Autonomous Government. The flora includes Mediterranean pines, carob, juniper, boxwood, olive and palm trees, while the fauna is most notable for numbers of wild mountain goats (Iberian Ibex). There are various coastal hiking trails of varying lengths and difficulty. The reserve is a major attraction for La Herradura's many diving centres, as well as nature photographers and birdwatchers.

The eastern headland of Punta de la Mona separates the town from the marina of Punta de la Mona, formerly called Marina del Este, the beach of Los Berengueles and the naturist beach of El Muerto which borders Cotobro ravine. To the west of Cerro Gordo is the naturist beach of Cantarriján, which borders the province of Málaga.

=== Limits ===
La Herradura is bordered to the north by the municipality of Otívar, to the east by the ravine of Cotobro and the town of Almuñecar, to the south by the Mediterranean Sea and to the west by the ravine of Cantarriján and the municipality of Nerja.

== Demography ==
According to the Spanish National Statistical Institute, in 2012 La Herradura had 4,248 inhabitants.

== Culture ==
=== Celebrations ===
Saint Joseph (San José [saŋ xoˈse] in Spanish), the town's patron saint, is honoured every year with a fair and other events around 19 March.

Fiesta de las Cruces (Day of the Cross), or Cruz de Mayo (May Cross), is celebrated from 1 to 3 May.

The night of San Juan from 23 to 24 June sees bonfires lit on the beach. At midnight, people wash their eyes in the sea, for good luck throughout the year. Traditionally, the sea was not considered safe enough to swim in for the summer season until it has been blessed on this date.

Holy Week celebrations are led by the Brotherhood of La Herradura, who parade a series of holy images through the town. These include the images seen during San José and the Virgen del Carmen celebrations.

La Virgen del Carmen, patron saint of fishermen and sailors, is celebrated on 16 July. A flower-covered effigy of the Virgin Mary – Stella Maris, "Queen of the Sea" – is paraded through the streets and taken out to sea in a flotilla of fishing boats, with a firework display at night.

Dawn Rosary takes place in the early hours of 21 to 24 December, a tradition that dates back to the end of the 19th century. An image of the Virgin Mary on a banner, flanked by two lanterns, is carried through the streets of the town. The parade is accompanied by musicians with string instruments, bells and triangles, and singers praising the Virgin. The parade ends with a mass, and typical Andalucian carols.

== Eminent personalities ==
Jesús Espigares Mira, president of Interpol between 2000 and 2004, was born in La Herradura in 1946. He was the first Spaniard and first native Spanish speaker to run the institution.

== How to get to La Herradura ==
By road: La Herradura can be reached via the coastal highway A7, with connections from Almería to the East and from Malaga to the West. Access from the North is available via the A-44 highway, also known as Autovía de Sierra Nevada-Costa Tropical.

By train: There are no nearby train connections to reach La Herradura.

By sea: La Herradura boasts its own marina, Marina del Este, which offers docking for private boats. However, it is a smaller marina and does not accommodate large ships or cruises. Alternatively, you can access La Herradura via the Port of Motril, located less than 20 kilometers away, which offers ferry services and commercial cruises.

By air: La Herradura does not have its own airport. The closest airports are Federico Garcia Lorca Airport in Granada-Jaen (GRX) and Malaga - Costa del Sol Airport (AGP). Malaga Airport is the most common airport to reach La Herradura due to its better air connections. From either airport, you can take a direct bus to La Herradura from the respective bus stations. Taxis are available at the arrivals terminal in both airports. The approximate cost for a taxi from Malaga Airport to La Herradura ranges from 115 to 140 euros, depending on various factors. Car rental companies and pre-booked private transfer services are also available at both airports, but there is no shared shuttle service.
