= Almuñécar =

- Municipality
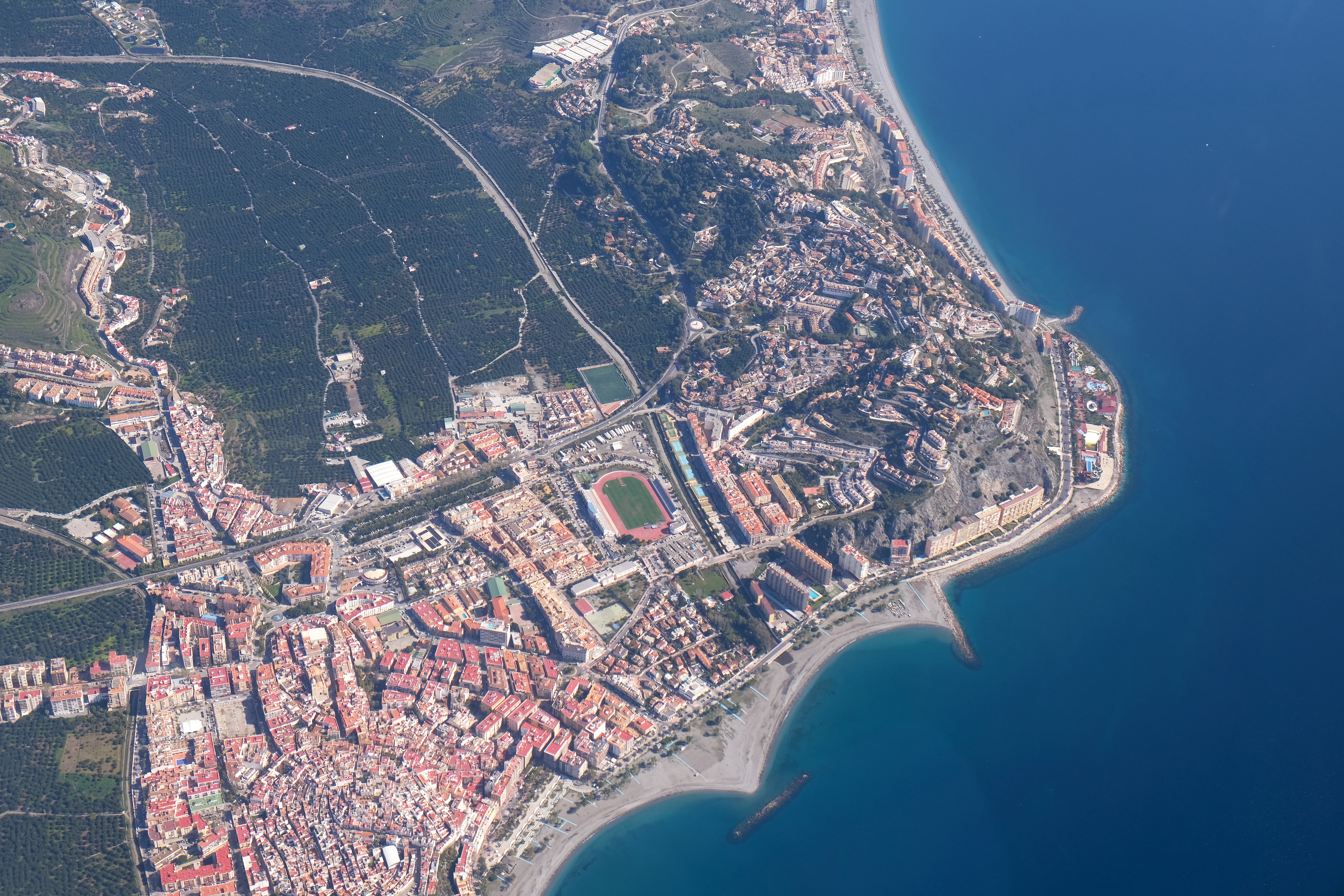
- Almuñécar

- Flag Coat of arms

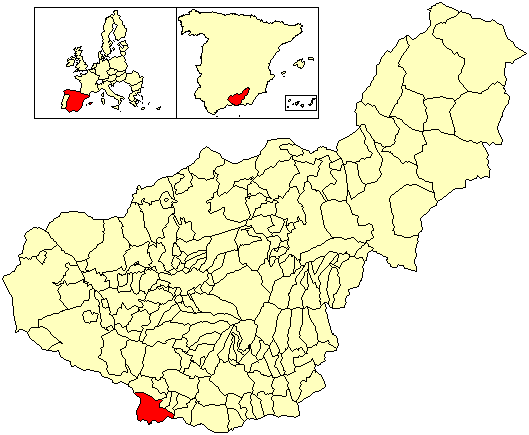

- Location in Spain
- Coordinates: 36°44′N 3°41′W
- Country: Spain
- Autonomous community: Andalusia
- Province: Granada
- Comarca: Costa Granadina
- Judicial district: Almuñécar
- Founded: ~800BC

Government
  - Alcalde: Juan José Ruiz Joya (2022) (PP)

Area
  - Total: 83.36 km^{2} (32.19 sq mi)
- Elevation: 24 m (79 ft)
- Highest elevation: 87 m (285 ft)
- Lowest elevation: 0 m (0 ft)

Population (2025-01-01)
  - Total: 27,544
  - Density: 330.4/km^{2} (855.8/sq mi)
- Demonyms: Sexitano, -na o almuñequero, -ra
- Time zone: UTC+1 (CET)
  - Summer (DST): UTC+2 (CEST)
- Postal code: 18690 (Almuñécar y Velilla-Taramay); 18697 (La Herradura)
- Website: Official website

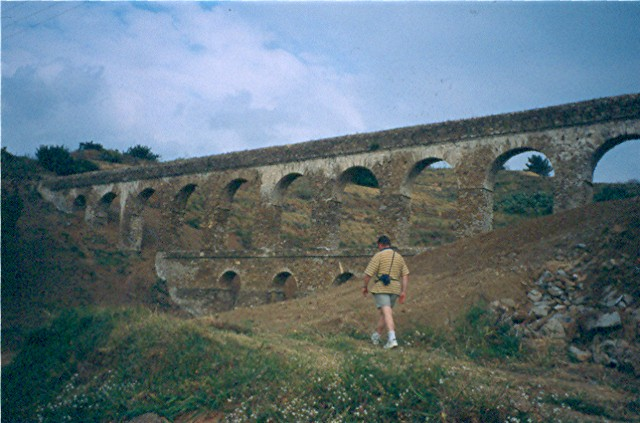
The Roman aqueduct in the Seco River valley about 2 km (1 mi) north of Almuñécar

Almuñécar (Spanish pronunciation: [almuˈɲekaɾ]) is a Spanish city and municipality located in the southwestern part of the comarca of the Costa Granadina, in the province of Granada. It is located on the shores of the Mediterranean sea and borders the Granadin municipalities of Otívar, Jete, Ítrabo and Salobreña, and with the Malagueño municipality of Nerja. The Verde river runs through its territory. The municipality of Sexitano includes the population centers of Almuñécar —municipal capital—, La Herradura, Velilla-Taramay, Torrecuevas, Río Seco, El Rescate and El Cerval.

Since 1975, the town has become one of the most important tourist towns in Granada province and on the Costa Granadina; it has good transport connections and a football (soccer) stadium.

Almuñécar's coat of arms, which shows the turbaned heads of three Barbary pirates floating in the sea, was granted to the town by King Carlos I in 1526 for its having destroyed a Berber raiding force.

== Politics ==
Juan José Ruiz Joya is the current mayor of Almuñecar. The city council elected Ruiz Joya, local leader of the People's Party (Partido Popular), on 2022.

== History ==
Almuñécar began as a Phoenician colony named Sexi, and even today, some of its inhabitants still call themselves Sexitanos. Under the Moors, Almuñécar blossomed as the fishing town of al-Munakkab (Arabic: المُنَكَّب) or Ḥiṣn-al-Munakkab (حصن المنكب). Although the Phoenician and Roman history of the district was known from Greek and Roman sources it was not until the 1950s that significant archaeological evidence was discovered.

=== Antiquity ===
==== Phoenician ====
The Phoenicians first established a colony in Almuñécar in about 800 BC and this developed for six hundred years into an important port and town with the name of Ex or Sexi and with a large fish salting and curing industry that was a major supplier of Greece and Rome. They also supplied a prized fish paste called garum made from the intestines of small fishes by a process of fermentation. Archaeological evidence comes chiefly from Phoenician cemeteries, the earlier Laurita necropolis on the hillside at Cerro San Cristobal and the later necropolis at Punte de Noy. An extensive collection of Phoenician grave goods and other artifacts is on display in the town museum located at the Castle of San Miguel and in the 'Cueva de Siete Palacios'.

==== Roman ====
The Romans came to southern Spain at the time of the Second Punic War between Rome and Carthage in 218 BC as part of their campaign to subdue the Phoenician settlements along the coast. During 700 years of Roman rule the town and its industry prospered, and in 49 BC the municipality (one of 20 cities in Spain honoured at that time) was given the title Firmium Julium Sexi in recognition of the town's loyalty to Rome.

Major evidence of the fish salting and curing industry was uncovered during excavations in the 1970s and 1980s in the extensive Majuelo Botanical Gardens. These revealed the great extent of the rebuilding and modernising of the industry under Roman influence. A segment of the site has been carefully conserved, giving some idea of the size of the industry. This industry required not only large quantities of fish and sea salt, produced in many places along the coast, but also a constant supply of fresh running water.

To meet this demand the Romans built in the 1st century AD four miles of water conduit in the valleys of the Rio Seco and the Rio Verde, including five significant aqueducts. All, remarkably, are still standing and four of them are still in use after 2,000 years – adapted by the Moors over the centuries to serve the needs of crop irrigation. The Roman water supply also served the town and recent excavations in the town centre have uncovered the fifth aqueduct and the Roman baths.

The Romans were probably the first to fortify the Castle of Saint Miguel, although frequent rebuilding has obliterated most of the very extensive Roman fortifications. These included a bridge from the castle to the 'Peñon del Santo' with a massive 100 foot (30 m) high arch that survived until at least 1800.

Just below the castle on the landward side is the 'Cueva de Siete Palacios', which translates as 'Cave of the Seven Palaces'. However, it is not actually a cave, rather it is the largest remnant of a Roman palace yet found in Almuñécar, having survived for hundreds of years as 'social housing' until the 'cave dwellers' were re-housed in the 1970s. Only then did its true origins become apparent. It now houses the town museum.

Other important Roman remains in the district include a Roman bridge at Cotobro and Roman tombs in several locations.

=== Middle Ages ===
==== Visigoths ====
With the decline of the Western Roman Empire in the 5th century, Germanic peoples, including the Visigoths, crossed the Pyrenees mountain range into the Iberian peninsula. By 456 the Visigoths emerged as the dominant power, and expanded their territory onto the southwestern Mediterranean coast. However, Hispania remained relatively Romanized under their rule. The Visigoths adopted Roman culture and language, and maintained many of the old Roman institutions, although much of the economic structure collapsed, and at Almuñécar the fish curing industry declined rapidly. The Catholic bishops were the rivals of Visigothic power and culture until the end of the 6th and beginning of the 7th century—the period of transition from Arianism to Catholicism in the Visigothic kingdom.

==== Muslims ====
Coat of arms of the town of Almuñécar, granted by Emperor Charles V in 1526, showing the heads of three Barbary pirates floating in the sea.

In 755 Umayyad Abd ar-Rahman I of Damascus, the founder of the Emirate of Cordoba, arrived from North Africa to establish his kingdom. The castle remained the stronghold of the city and the seat of government and its walls were strengthened. Extensive dungeons were built for those out of favour with local rulers, but also baths for the use of the social elite during the al-Andalus centuries.

The cross on Peñon del Santo, the rock at the old harbour entrance, marks the defeat of the Arabs, their surrender at Almuñécar, and the annexation to the Kingdom of Castille in 1489. The Arabic name المُنَكَّب (al-Munakkab, surrounded by mountains) gave origin to present-day Almuñécar.

=== Modern Era and Present ===
Following the restoration of Christian rule, new architectural statements were made – for example the construction of a new church was started in 1557 and completed to the latest design in 1600, the first Baroque-style church in the province of Granada. The old town was also Christianised (or perhaps paganised – by the Goddess of fertility herself), as in the building of the water fountain on the Calle Real (Royal Street), dated to 1559 and with the royal cypher above, but at that time using the existing Roman water supply from Las Angosturas first installed 1500 years earlier.

In 1562, a Spanish fleet sank in a storm in La Herradura Bay.

In 1563, Ottoman corsair Turgut Reis landed at the shores of the province of Granada and captured the coastal settlements in the area, including Almuñécar, along with 4,000 prisoners.

The castle was again extensively rebuilt and placed under the patronage of San Miguel. It was rebuilt and heavily fortified by the Christian King Charles III and last defended (by the French) in the Napoleonic Wars. Just one tower was partly destroyed but also most of the internal buildings. This was the work of the crew of the British vessel, HMS Hyacinth, acting in collaboration with Spanish partisans from Nerja on 27 May 1812. They caused the French garrison to flee and then attempted to render the castle unusable but with little success – owing to the gunpowder being damp. However, the Castle was finished as a military stronghold and following a cholera outbreak in 1830 the castle became the town cemetery, from which use it was cleared in 1986, to permit the restoration which is still in progress.

At the beginning of the Spanish Civil War Almuñécar was where English poet and author Laurie Lee was rescued by the Royal Navy in the summer of 1936. The story is featured in his book, As I Walked Out One Midsummer Morning. In earlier editions the town is referred to as "Castillo" to disguise people's identities.

The town's economy benefited from the raise of national and international tourism since the 1970s as well as neighbour Motril.

== Gastronomy ==
Almuñécar's gastronomy focuses mainly on fresh fish and subtropical fruit. Monkfish (rape), red sea bream (besugo), squids (calamares), grouper (mero), croaker (corvina), and shellfish paella are typical examples of local seafood. There are several restaurants next to the beach where meals featuring these can be eaten al fresco (at tables outside) in the sea breezes. Pub crawls with stops at several bars to try different tapas are also popular.

The soil in the area is very fertile, and due to the semi-tropical climate, tropical fruits can be grown here. The most notable are mangos, avocados, loquats, and cherimoyas, but it is also easy to find papayas, guavas, lychees, kiwis, figs and even prickly pears, the fruit of the Opuntia ficus-indica cactus, which are used to make ice cream and jams sold in several local coffee shops.

Until the 1960s, Almuñécar had an important role as a sugar cane producer.

Some typical dessert cakes still made locally include:

- Cazuela Mohína: an almond-based cake made with brown sugar, sesame and aniseed.
- Torta de Alhajú: an almond cake wrapped in wafers and honey.
- Merengazo: a sponge cake topped with egg white meringue.

== Transport ==
=== Road traffic ===
Almuñécar is connected to the coastal highway A7, with Almería to the East and Malaga to the West. The A-44 highway, also known as Autovía de Sierra Nevada-Costa Tropical, runs north of the city.

=== Railways ===
Almuñécar does not have a railway connection.

=== Ferry connections ===
Almuñécar has a small marina, accessible by private boats. The Port of Motril is located less than 20 kilometers from Almuñécar and offers ferry services and even commercial cruises.

=== Air traffic ===
Almuñécar does not have its own airport, but there are two airports within a 90-kilometer radius: Federico García Lorca Granada Airport (GRX) and Malaga - Costa del Sol Airport (AGP).

== Gallery ==
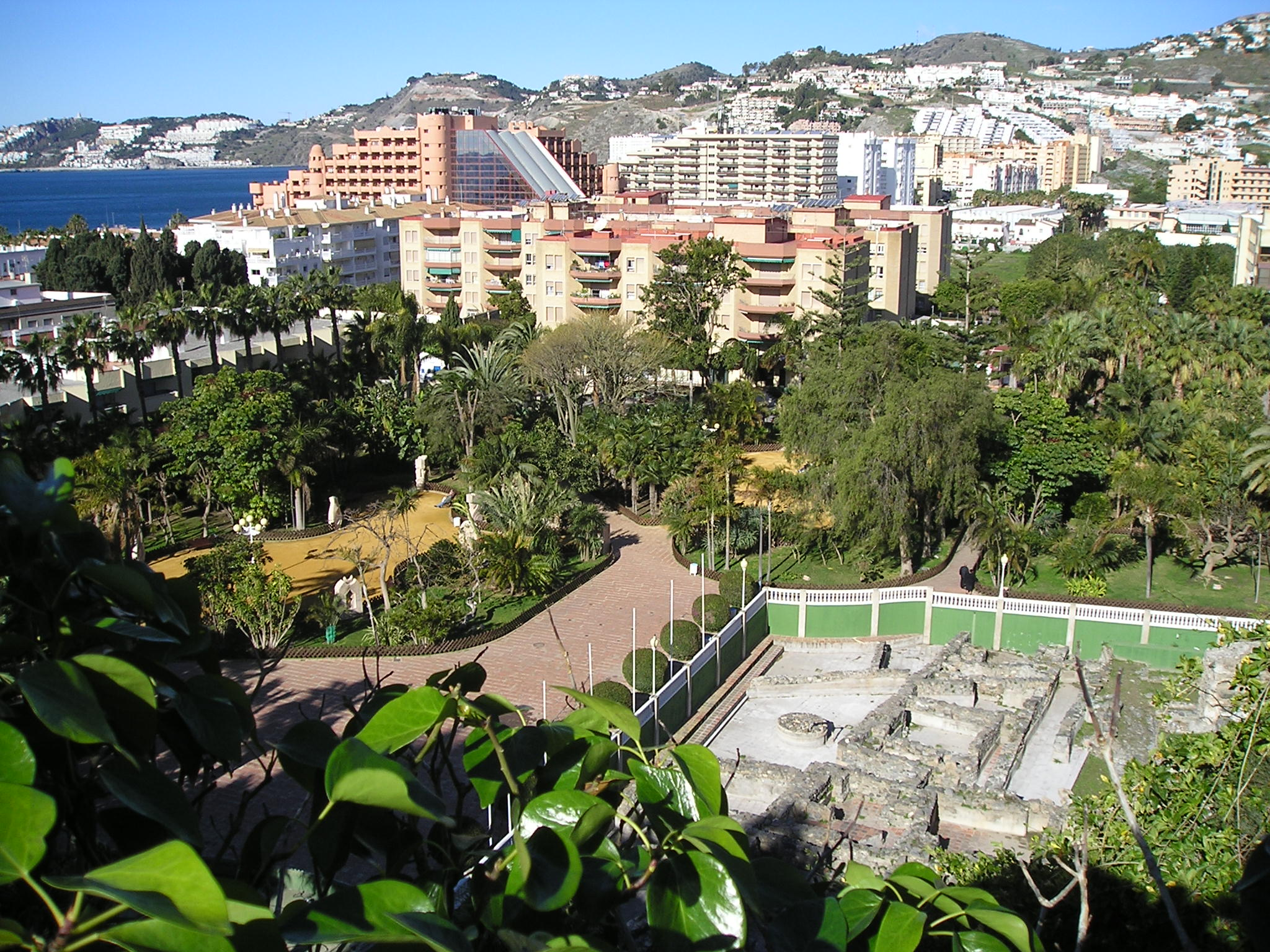
Excavated ruins of the Phoenician fish salting factory within the Majuelo Park

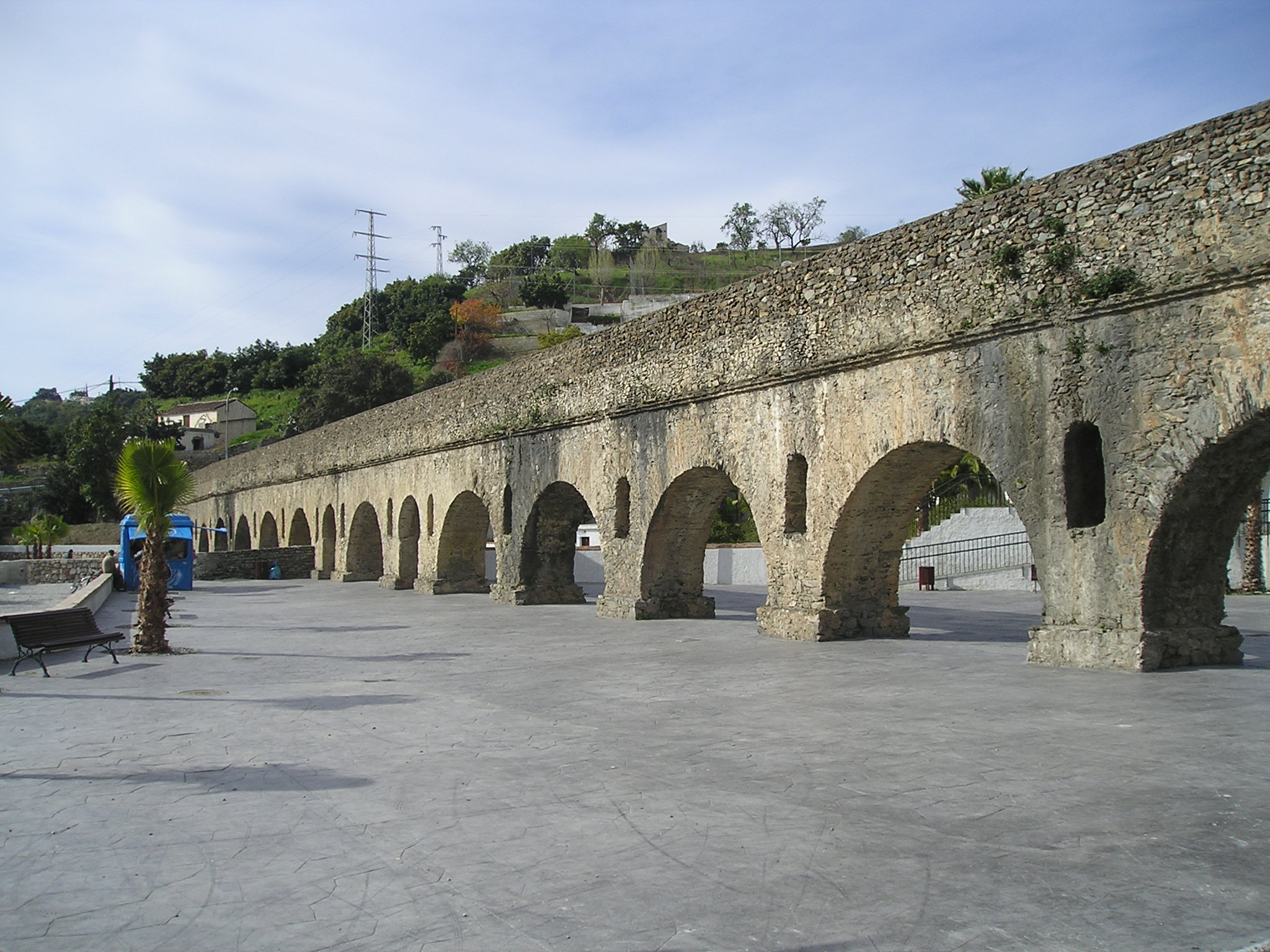
The Roman aqueduct at Torrecuevas near the source of the Rio Verde about 4 km (2 mi) north of Almuñécar

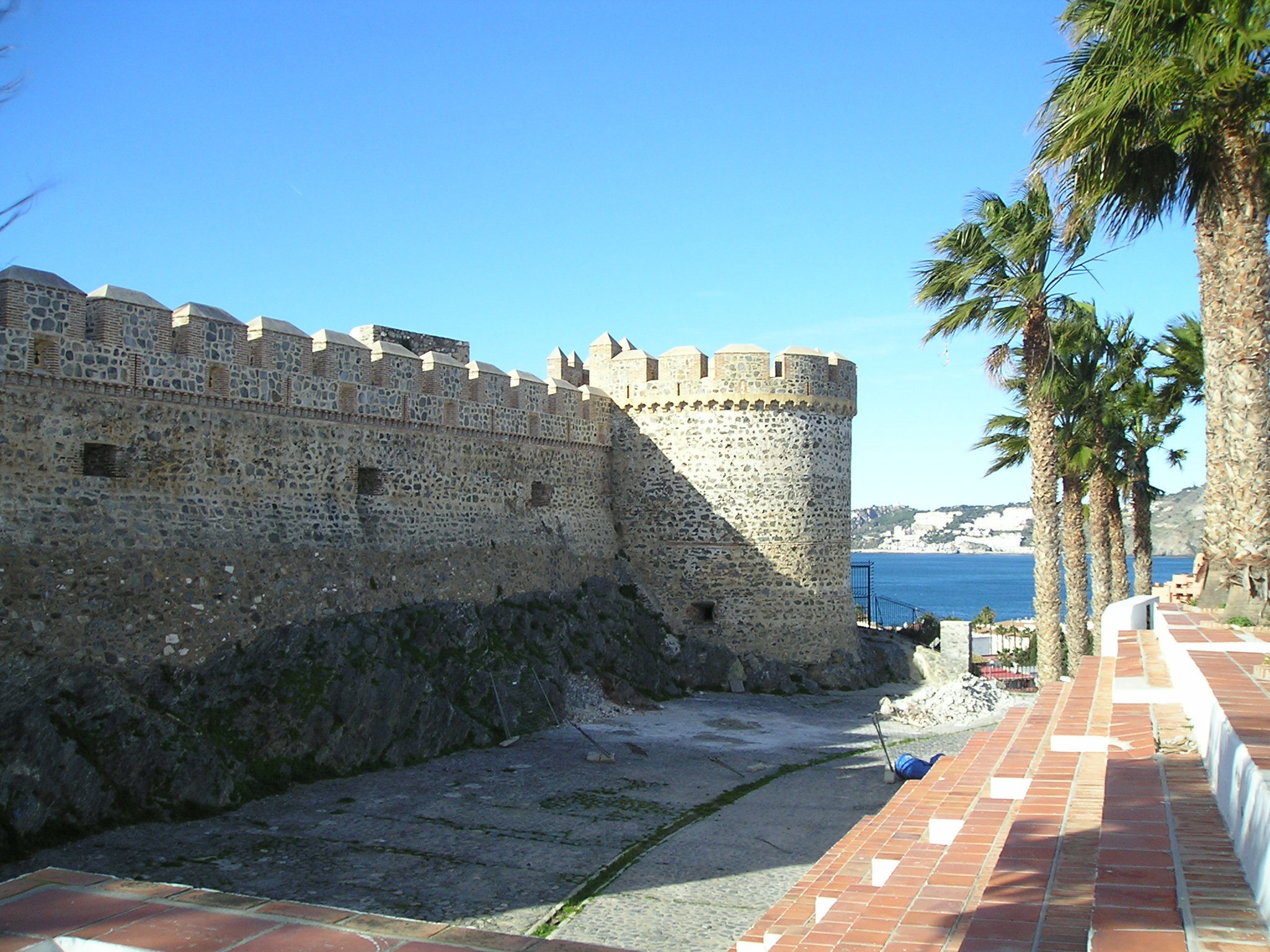
The castle of San Miguel

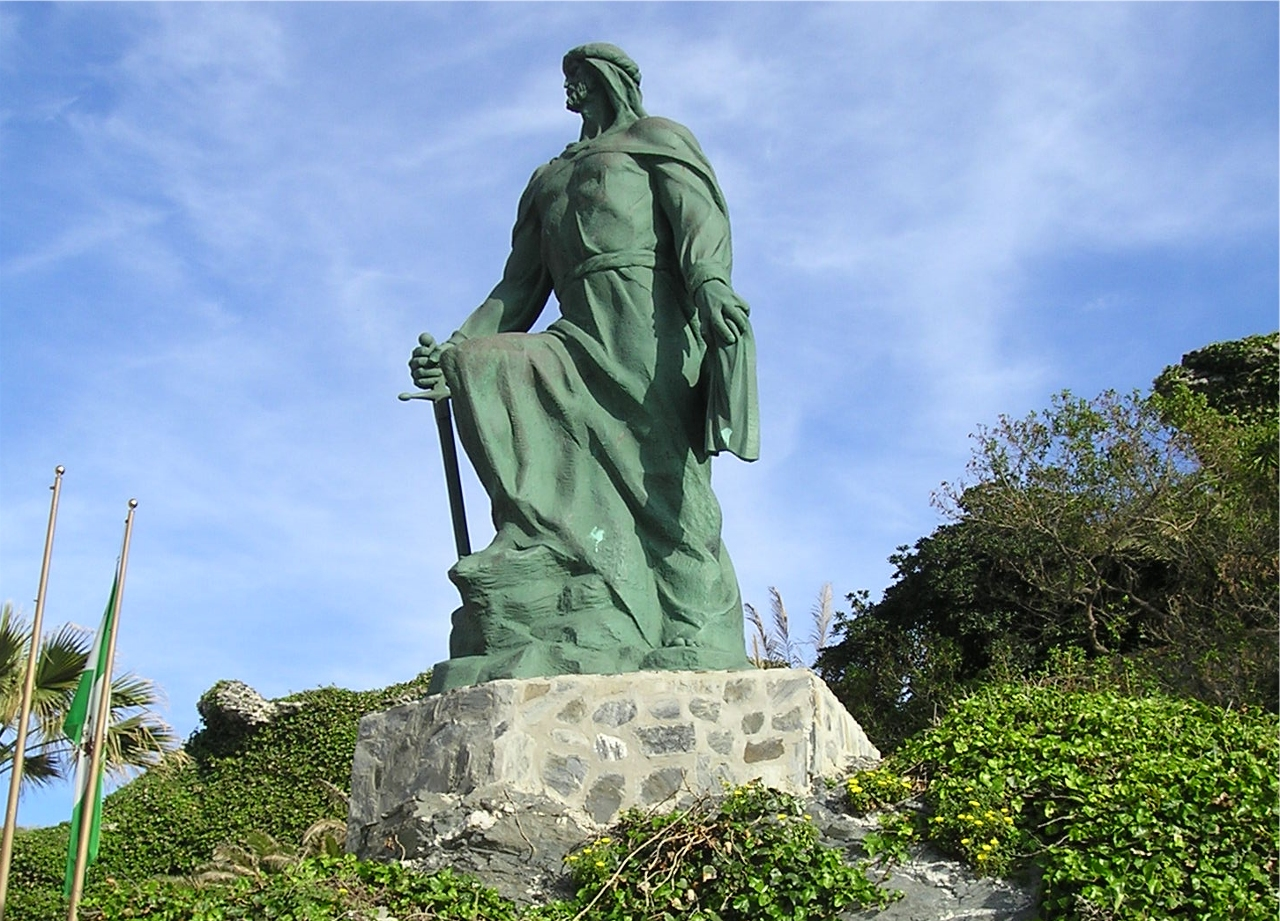
The statue of Abd-ar-Rahman I (the first Emir of Córdoba)

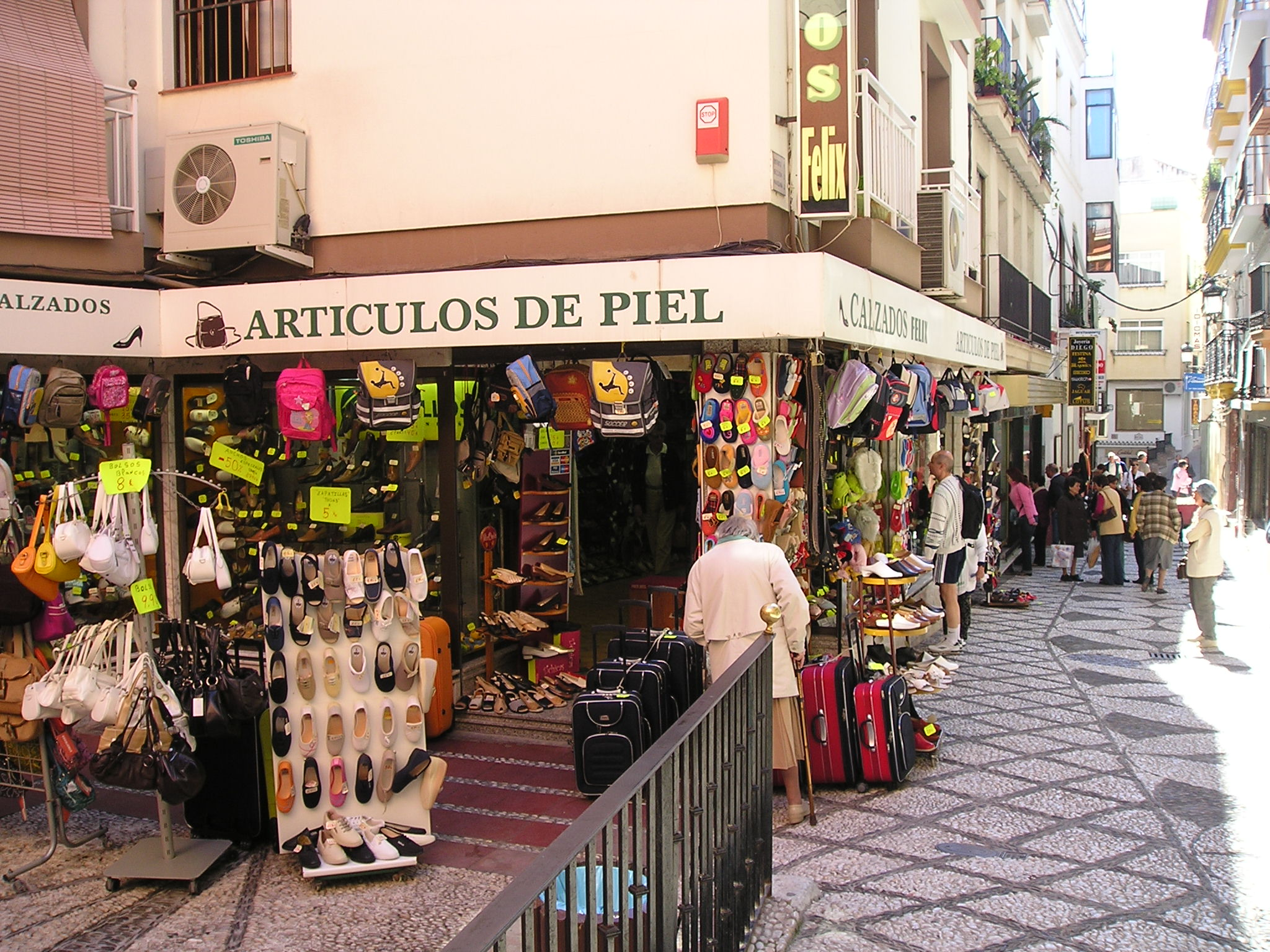
In the old town of Almuñécar

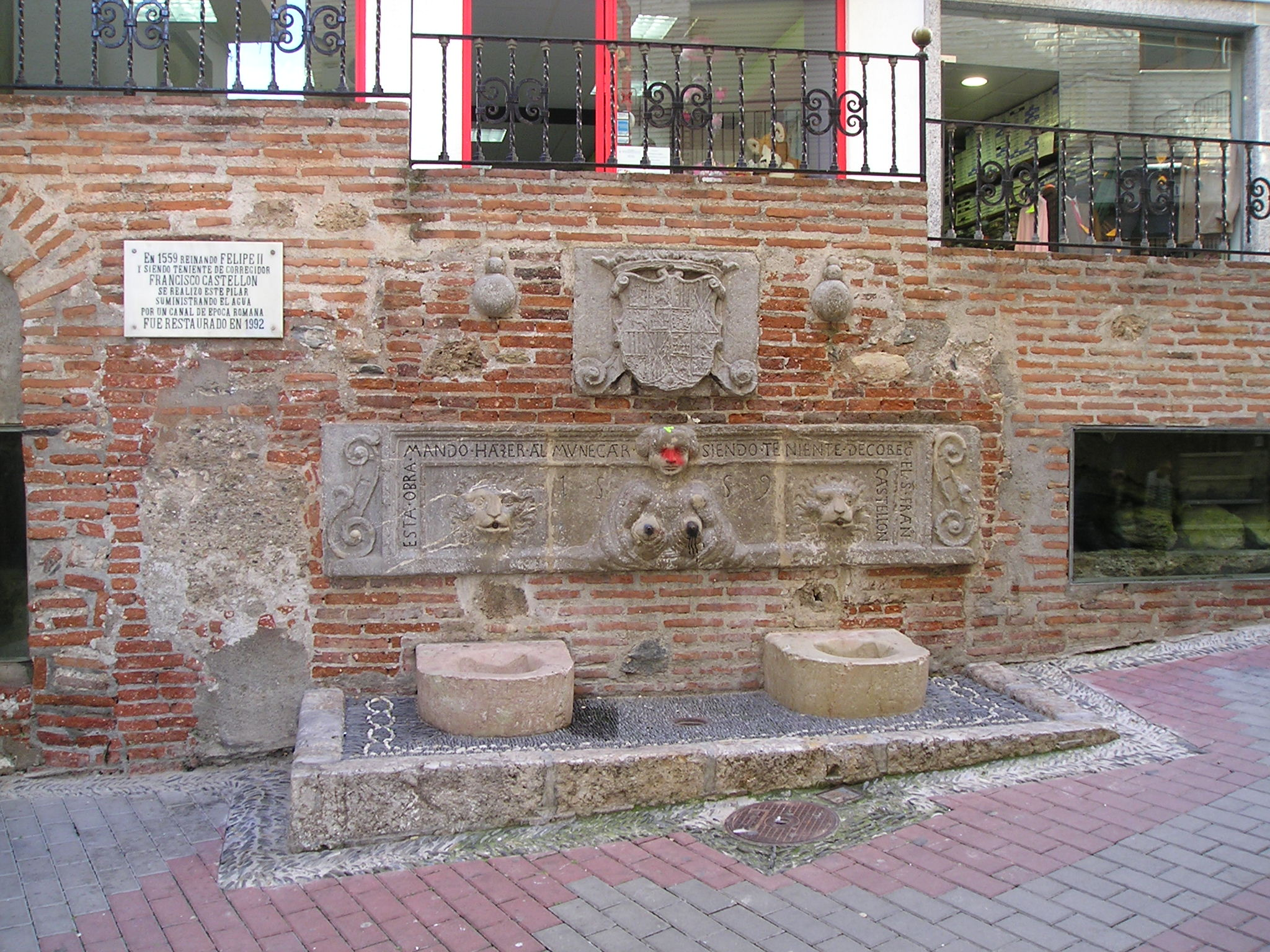
The Royal fountain in Calle Real built in 1559 but using the existing Roman water supply

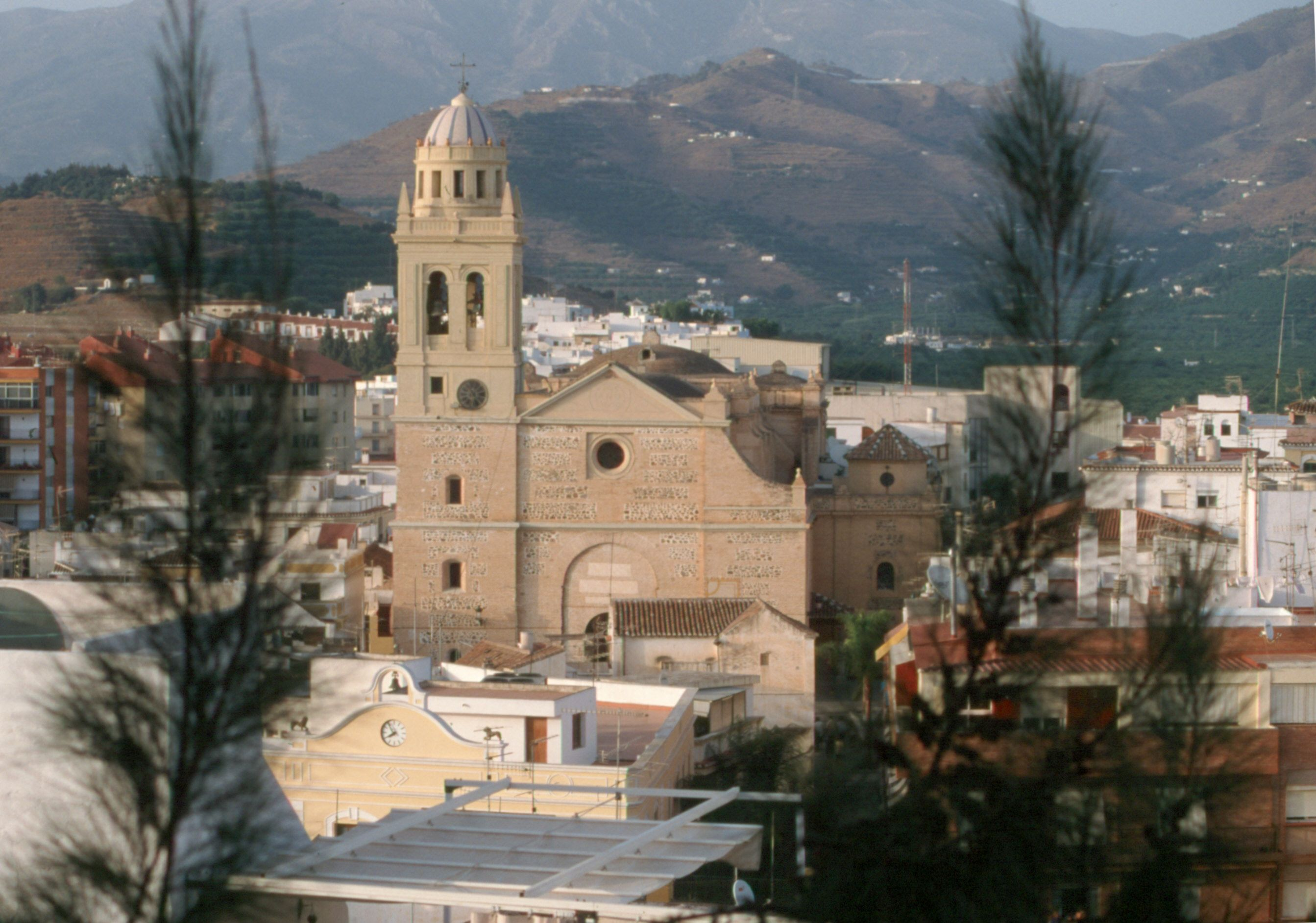
The church of the Incarnation in Almuñécar

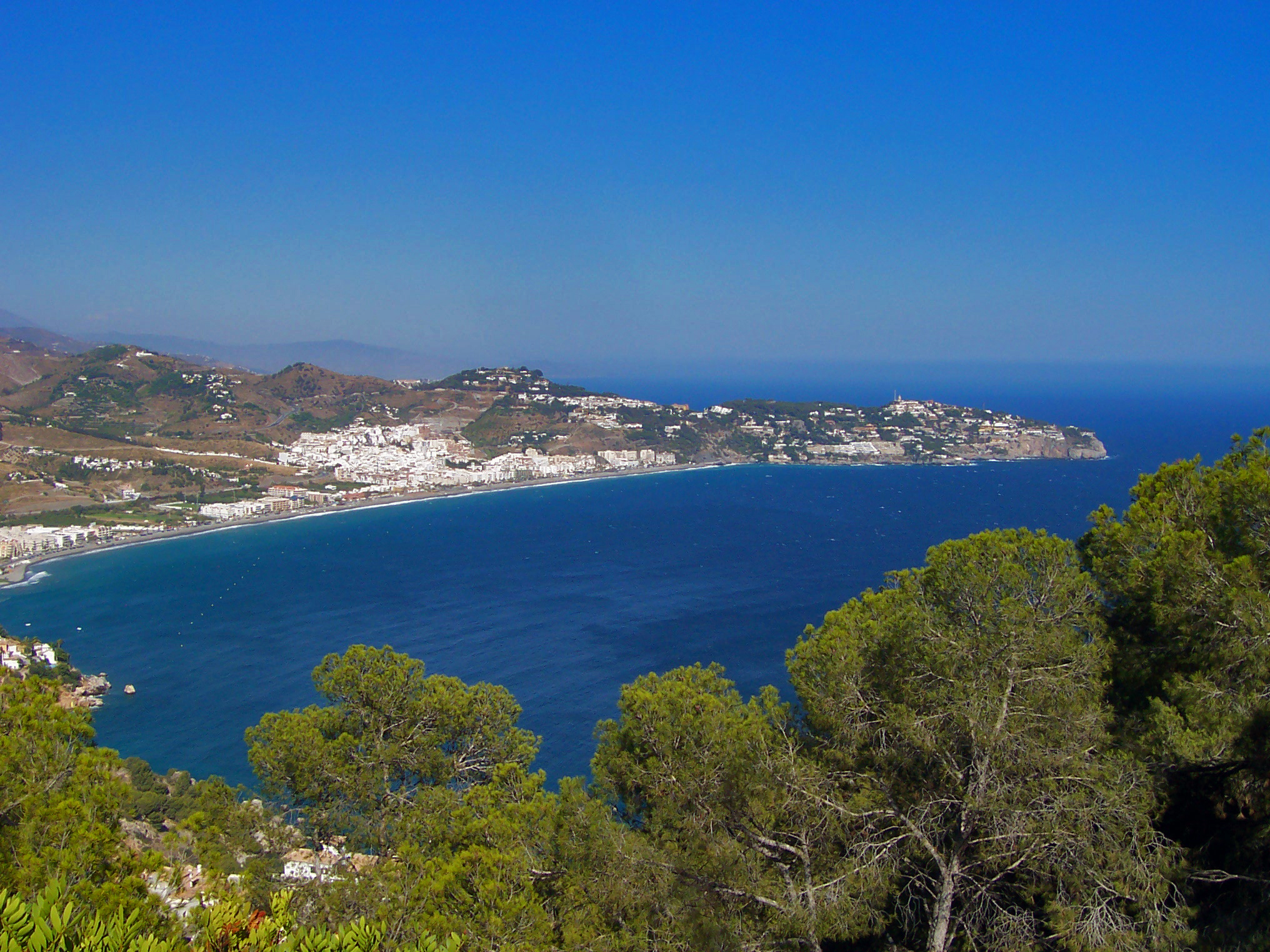
La Herradura Bay as seen from Cerro Gordo, at sunset

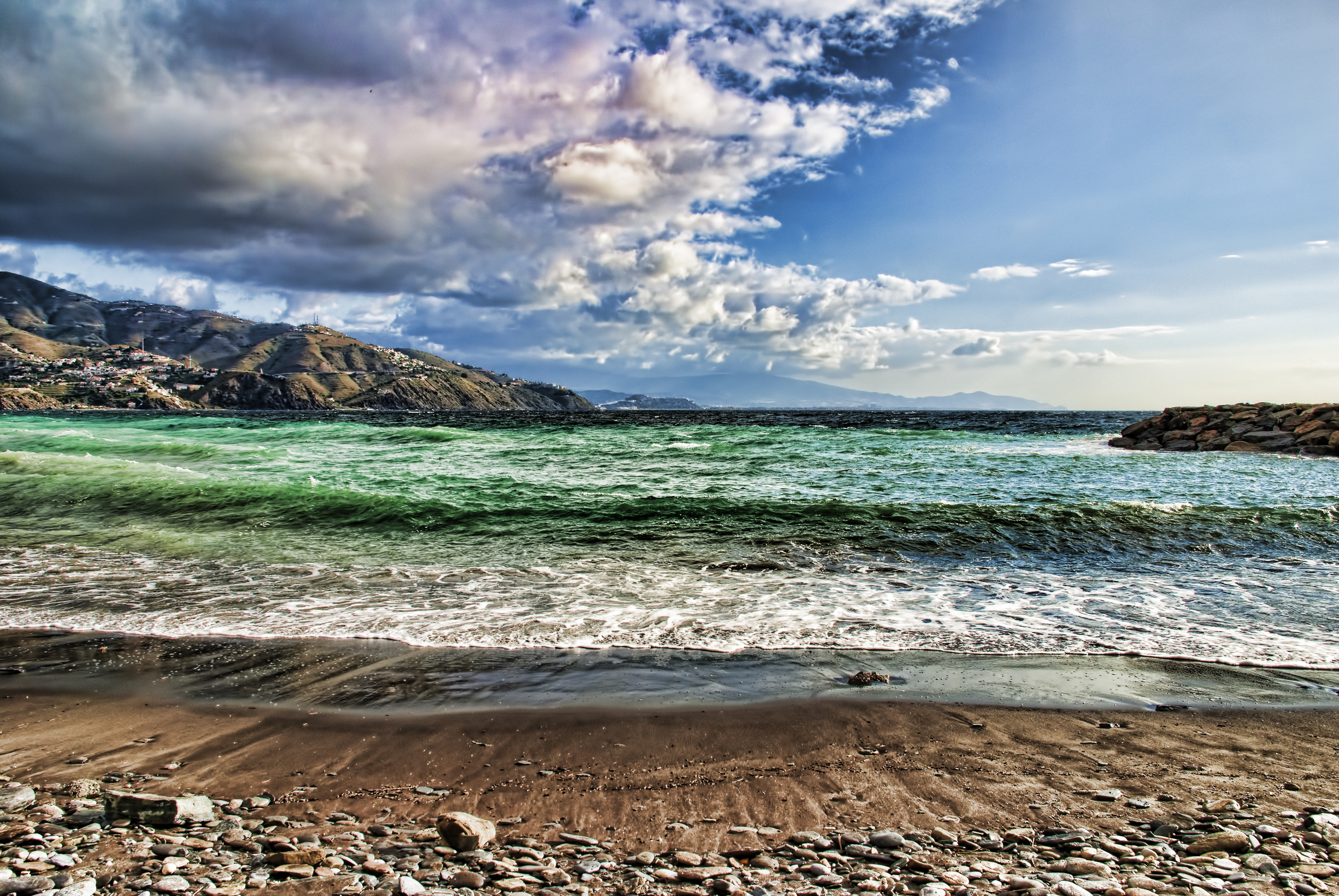
Almuñécar beach in winter—La Playa en Invierno

== International relations ==
=== Twin towns — Sister cities ===
Almuñécar is twinned with:

| Larache, Morocco; Fürstenfeldbruck, Bavaria, Germany; Livry-Gargan, Île-de-France, France; Cerveteri, Lazio, Italy | Puerto de la Cruz, Spain; (United States) Hendersonville, North Carolina, USA; Khan Yunis, Gaza Strip, Palestine |

== See also ==
- List of municipalities in Granada
