= Pünte (Wiltshausen) =

Cable ferry

Coordinates: 53°13′24″N 7°31′31″E

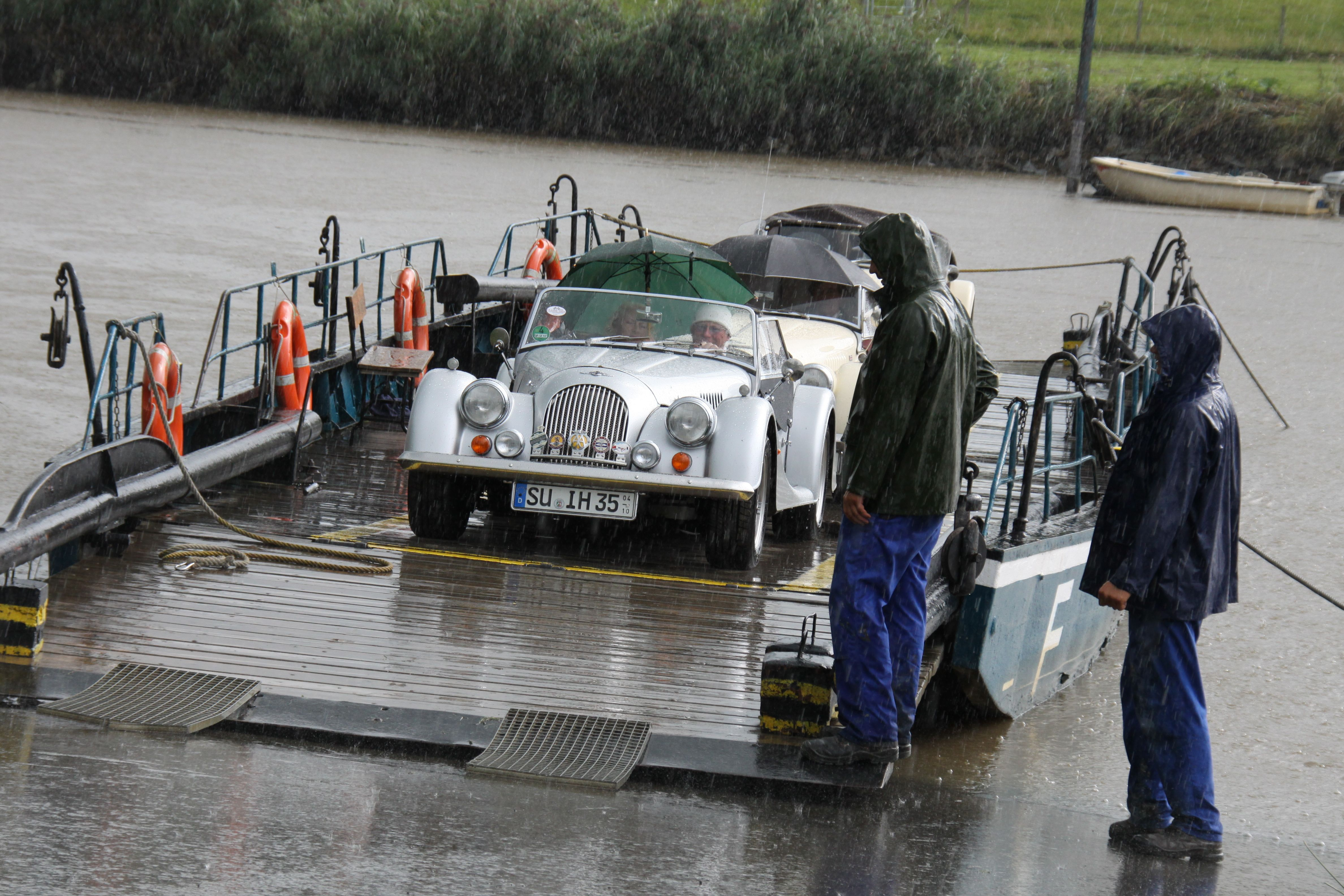
The pünte at the Wiltshausen landing stage.

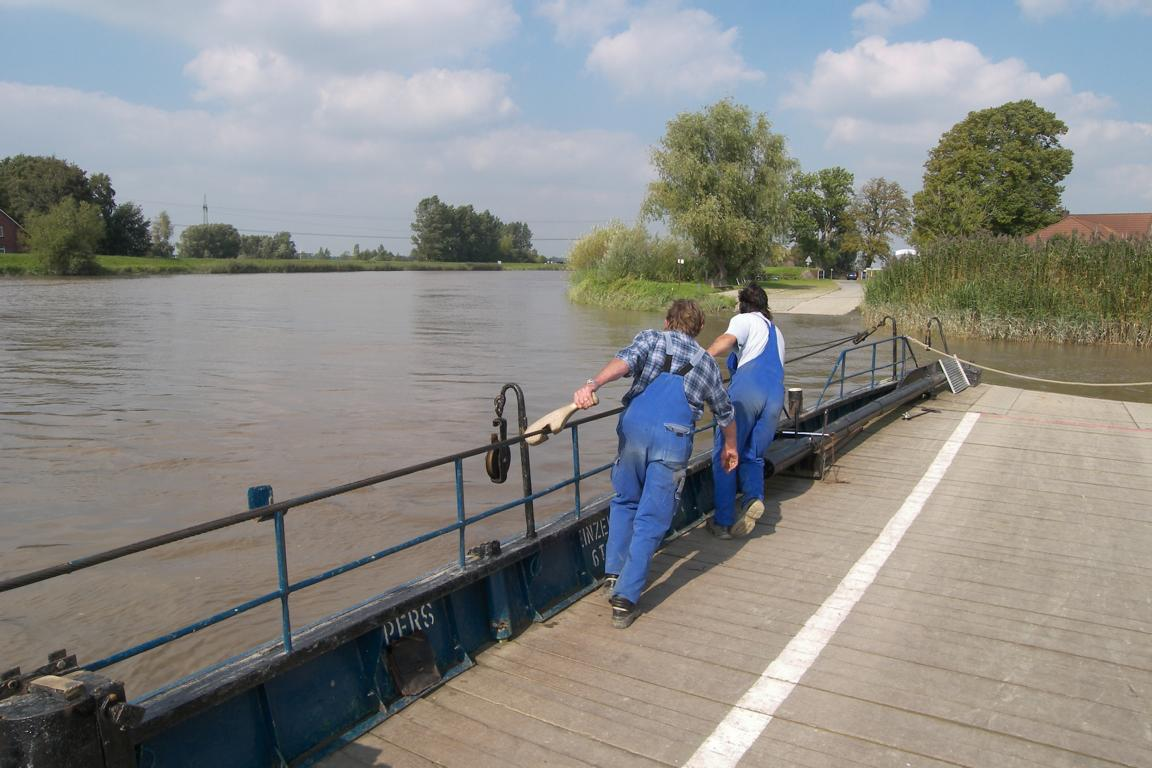
The ferryboat men at their work.

The Pünte in Wiltshausen, part of the borough of Leer in East Frisia, Germany, is a small, hand-operated cable ferry over the River Jümme, close to its confluence with the Leda. It links the villages of Amdorf and Wiltshausen and is believed to be the oldest hand-hauled ferry in Northern Europe.

The crossing at Wiltshausen is recorded as being in operation as early as 1562. In former times it ferried horses and carts, cattle, people with bicycles and handcarts.

It was used until 1975, its last operator, the county of Leer, then closed it for financial reasons. When its closure was announced in 1974 a citizens' movement formed the "Society for the Preservation of the Historic Pünte As A Monument on the Water" (Verein zur Förderung und Erhaltung der historischen Pünte als Denkmal auf dem Wasser), which restarted the operation of the ferry in 1988. In 2002 the pünte was placed under conservation.

From the outset, the society had several hundred local members; later people joined from all over the world, even those who had never seen the pünte themselves. Although the society is voluntary, it has not received any public subsidies since the 1980s.

The hand-operated, rope-guided punt-type ferry can transport up to three cars and about 30 foot passengers. Its operating season is from May to early October and Wednesday to Sunday. Today, the pünte is relatively strongly aimed at the tourist trade. The pünte season traditionally begins on 1 May and is celebrated a bit like a folk festival.

Other pünten in the county of Leer, in Halte, Hilkenborg, Esklum and Loga, had been closed before the pünte at Wiltshausen.
