= Adolf Egeberg =

Norwegian journalist and national socialist

Adolf Egeberg Jr. (30 September 1909 – 22 June 1972) was a Norwegian journalist and national socialist. Egeberg worked as a correspondent for Nationen in Germany circa 1930, and he took courses in the SA in Munich, and SS in Berlin. He was involved in the short-lived Norwegian fascist party National Legion in 1927–28, before he founded the National Socialist Workers' Party of Norway (NNSAP) in 1930, modelled on the German Nazi Party (NSDAP). He gained financial support for his party from Eugen Nielsen, publisher of Fronten, in 1932. Egeberg left the party to join the founding of Nasjonal Samling (NS) in 1933, and got a position as editor of Vestlandets Avis (1934–36), the NS-paper published in Stavanger. He was part of a circle, some of whom founded the periodical Ragnarok, that sought to push NS in a national socialist direction.

He died in 1972 and is buried at Vestre gravlund.
