= Polish Athletics Championships =

National athletics competition

- Current season, competition or edition: 2026 Polish Athletics Championships
- Sport: Athletics
- Founded: 1920
- Country: Poland

The Polish Athletics Championships (Polish: Mistrzostwa Polski seniorów w lekkoatletyce) is an annual outdoor track and field competition organised by the Polish Athletic Association (PZLA), which serves as the Polish national championship for the sport. It is typically held as a three-day event in the Polish summer, ranging from late June to early August. The venue of the championships changes annually.

Following the establishment of the PZLA in 1919, the national championships was first held in 1920 as a men-only event. The first two championships were held in Lviv (now in Ukraine) as this city was the headquarters of the national sports body and home to the only modern athletics stadium in the country. Women's events were included shortly after in 1922. The women's championships were contested separately from the men's from 1925 to 1949 (1945–46 excepted). The championships has been contested every year since its inception, bar a brief period from 1940 to 1944 when World War II led to abandonment of the competition.

== Events ==
The current track and field programme features a total of 40 individual Polish Championship athletics events, divided evenly between the sexes.

Track running

- 100 metres, 200 metres, 400 metres, 800 metres, 1500 metres, 5000 metres, 10,000 metres

Obstacle events

- 100 metres hurdles (women only), 110 metres hurdles (men only), 400 metres hurdles, 3000 metres steeplechase

Jumping events

- Pole vault, high jump, long jump, triple jump

Throwing events

- Shot put, discus throw, javelin throw, hammer throw

Combined events

- Decathlon (men only), heptathlon (women only)

The competition has featured more unusual events, such as the grenade throw for men in 1951 and both men and women in 1952. Men competed in the standing long jump at the 1920 and 1921 editions. This event had a longer history in the women's programme, lasting from 1927 to 1947. A men's 200 metres hurdles was first contested in1 1953 but stopped after 1963. Women contested that event in 1970 and 1971. A few events were unique to women, including the 60 metres (held from 1922 to 1950), a 250 m (1924 to 1926), a 1000 m in 1926 and 1927, and a 500 m from 1949 to 1951.

The women's programme expanded inline with international acceptance of women's athletics. The women's 1500 metres was added in 1969 and the 400 m hurdles followed the year after. The women's 3000 metres was introduced in 1973 and contested up to 1994. The women's equivalents of the men's standard 5000 m and 10,000 m were added in 1984. The 80 metres hurdles was combined with the 100 metres hurdles at the 1968 championships, before the longer distance replaced it the following year. Later additions to the women's programme were triple jump (1991), pole vault and hammer throw (1995) and the steeplechase (1999).

Championship events are held at different locations for combined track and field events, road running and walks, and cross country running.

== Editions ==
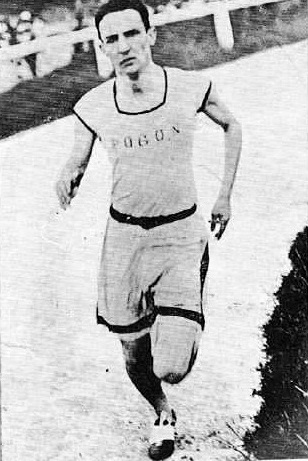
Zdzisław Latawiec was a medallist at the first championships

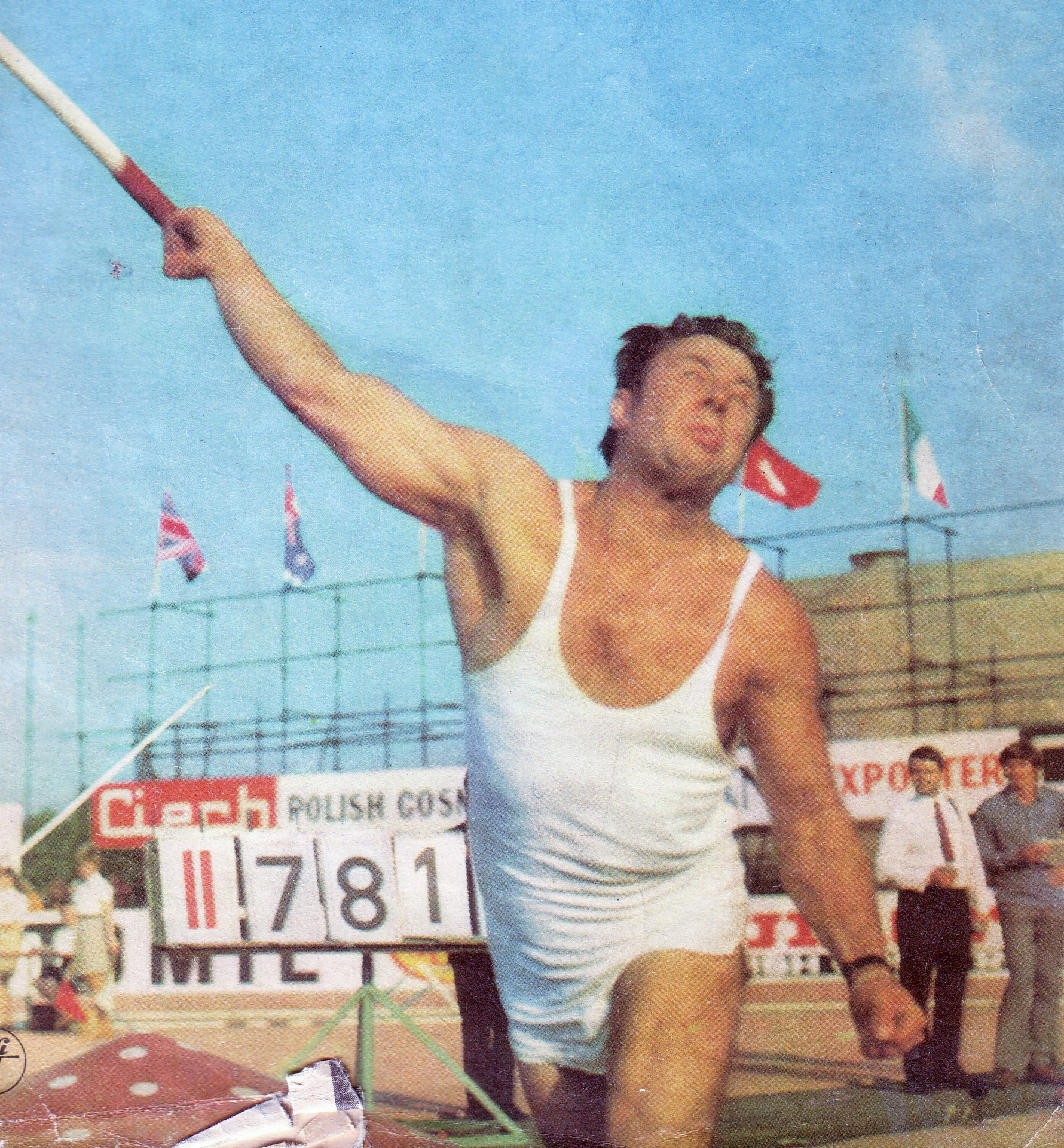
Janusz Sidło won multiple Polish javelin titles

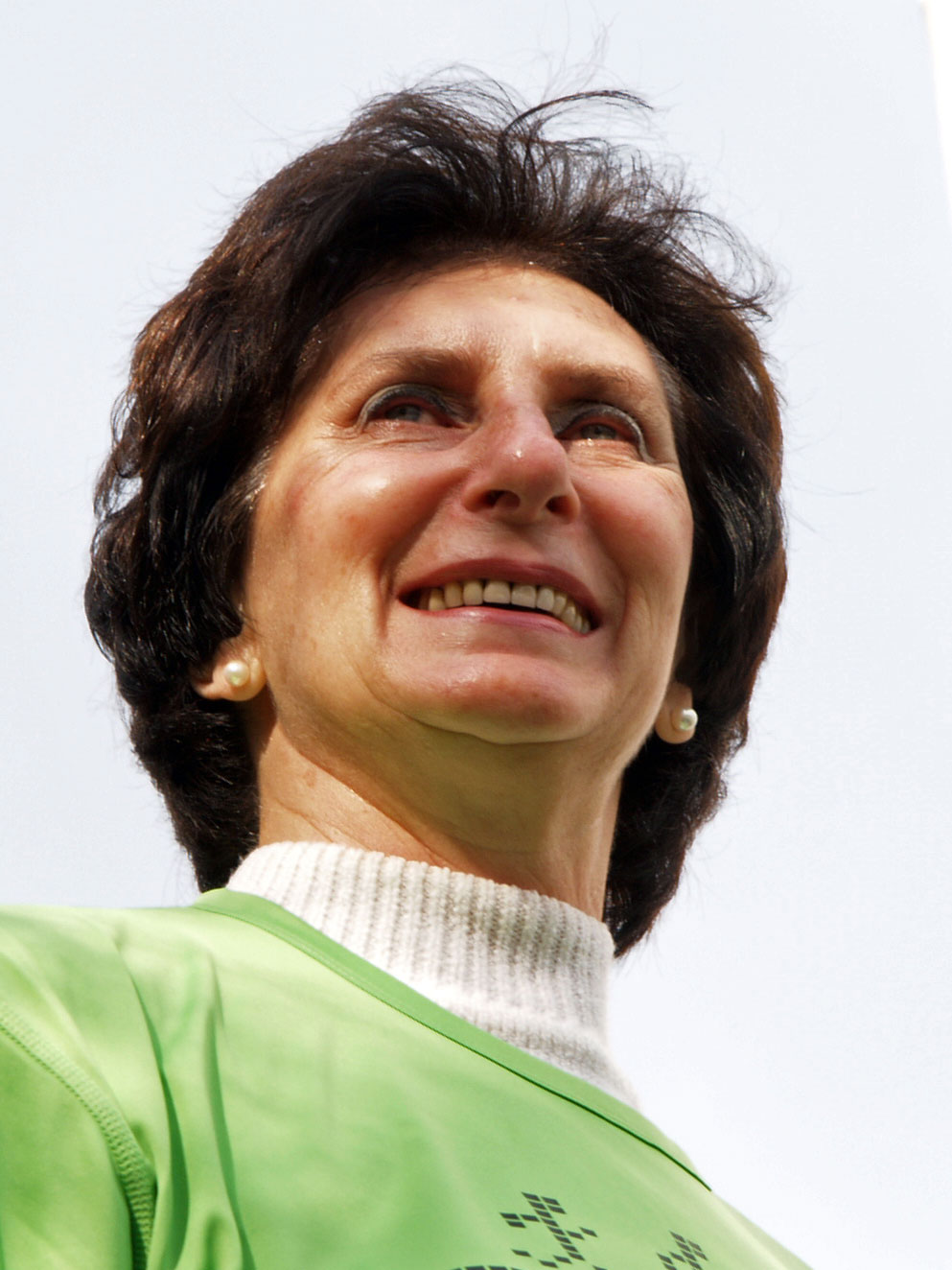
Irena Szewińska has won the most medals at the Polish Championships

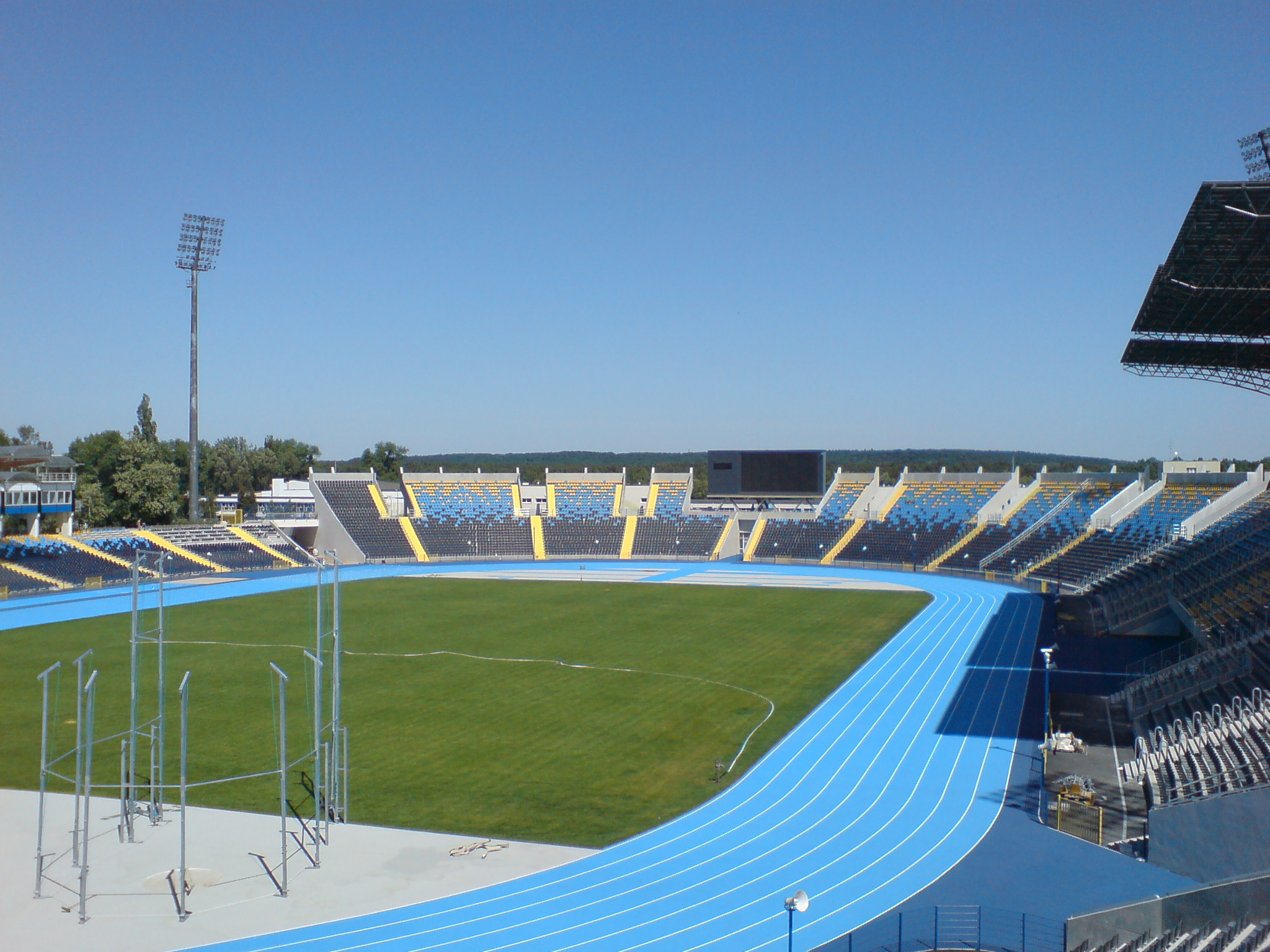
Bydgoszcz stadium (shown after modernization in 2008) is a regular venue for the Polish championships

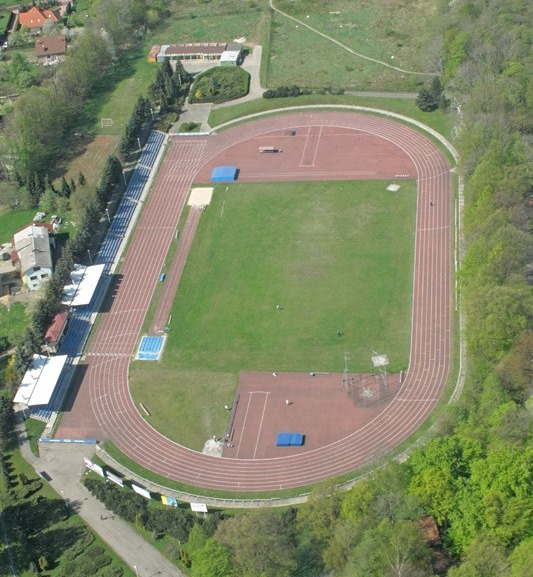
Bielsku-Białej Stadion played host in 2003, 2010 and 2012

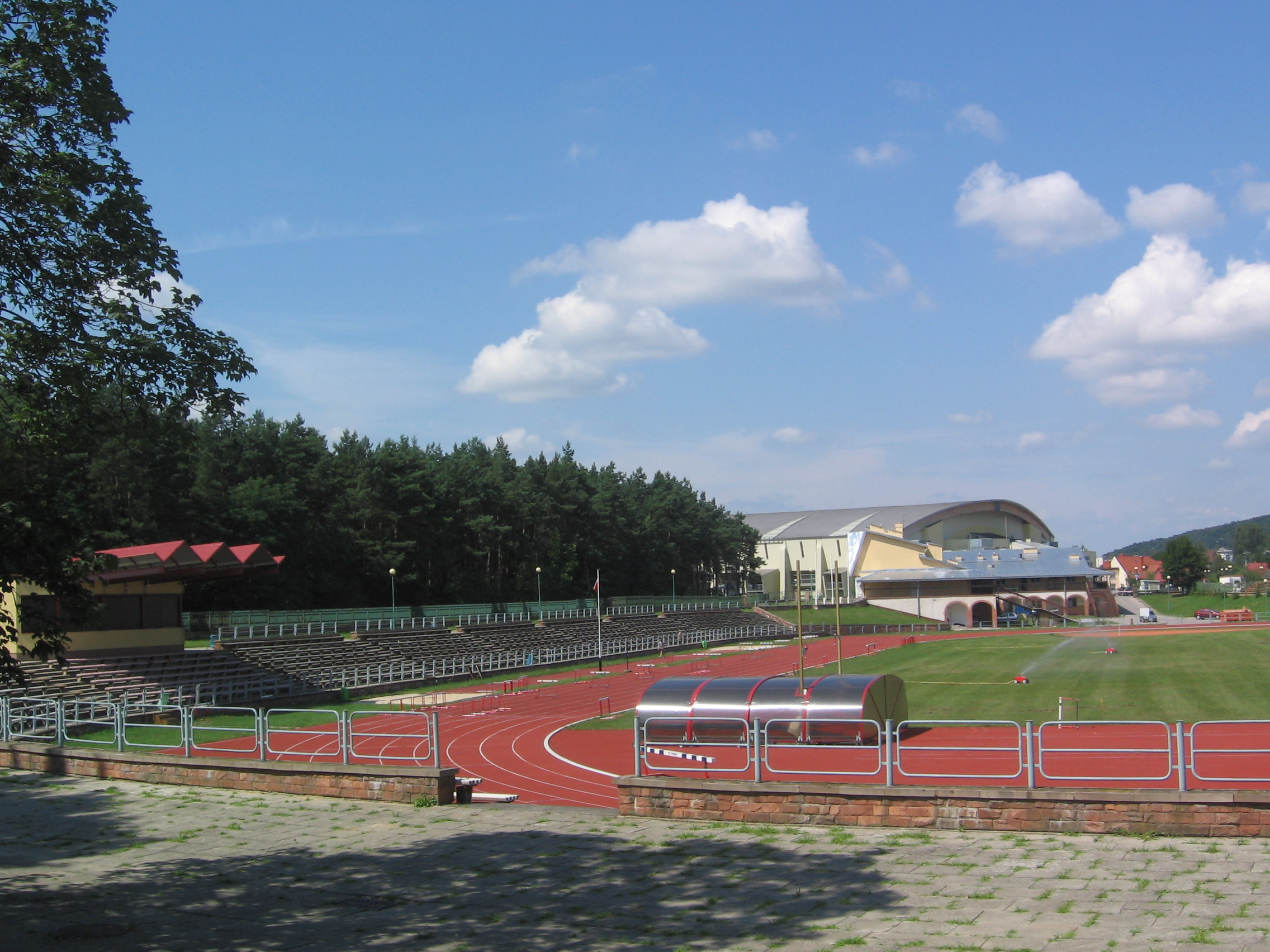
In 1991 and 1993, the Polish championship was held at the stadium in Kielce

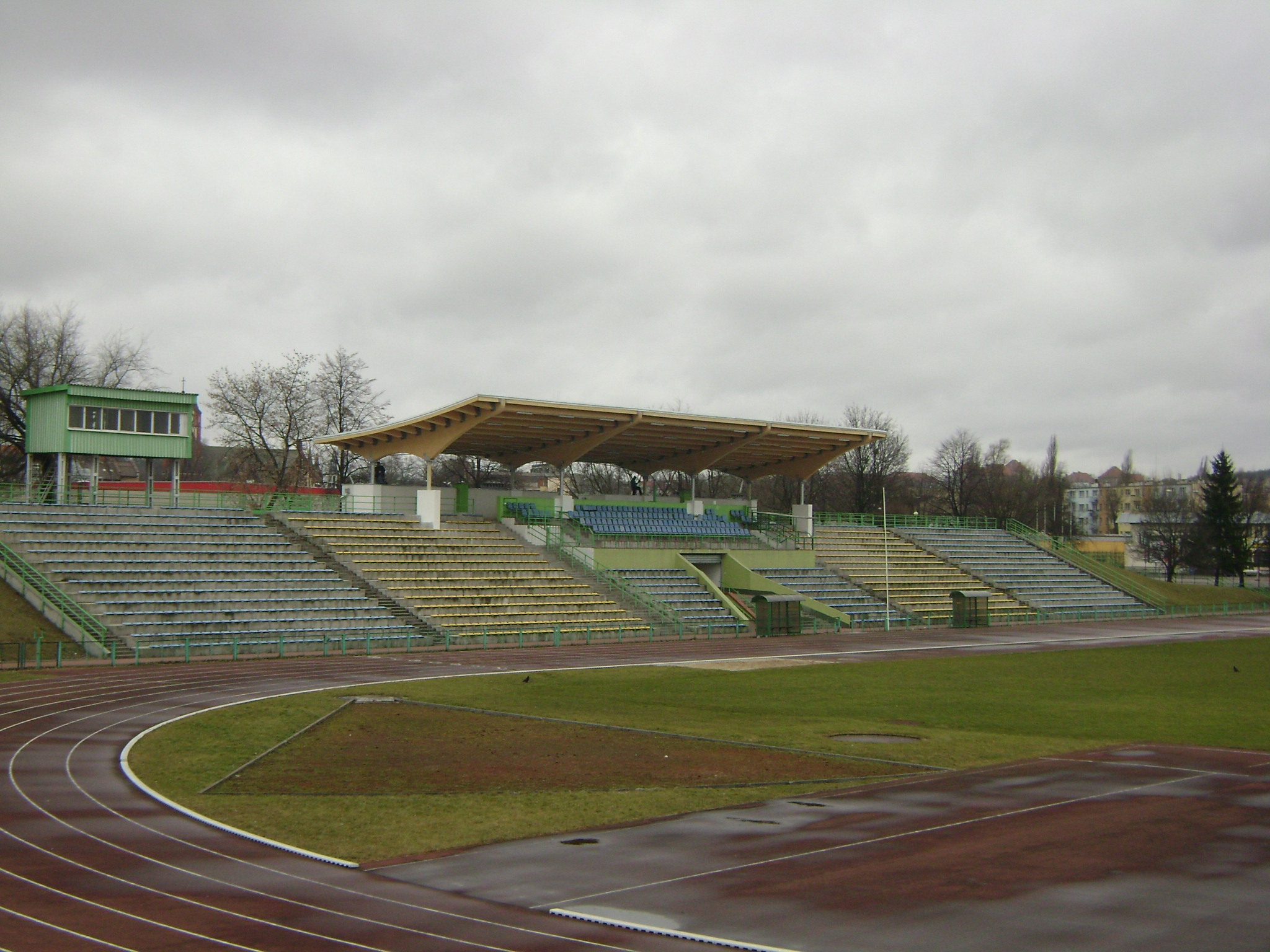
The stadium in Grudziądz hosted the Polish championship in 1986 and 1988

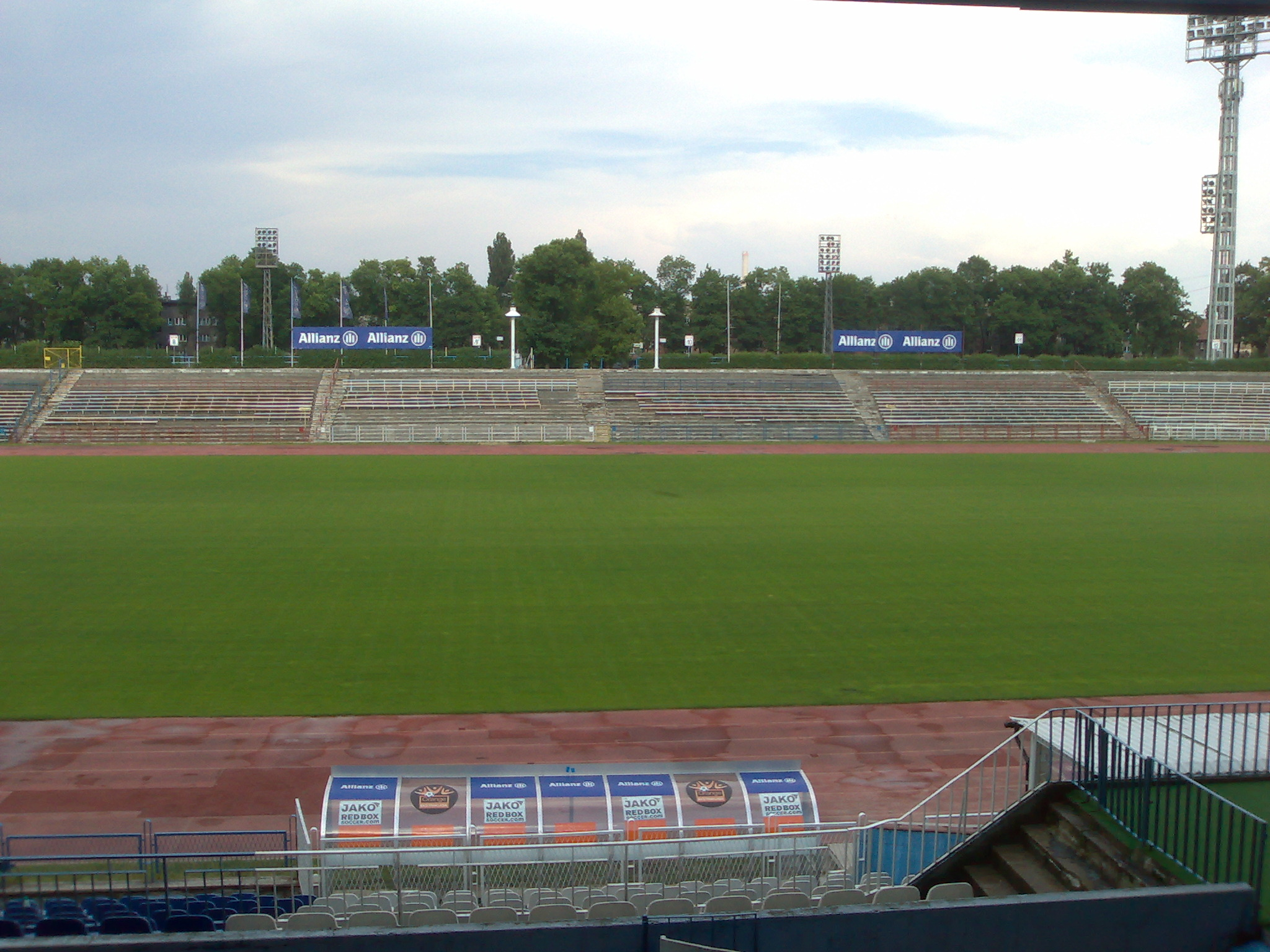
The stadium in Zabrze twice hosted the championships

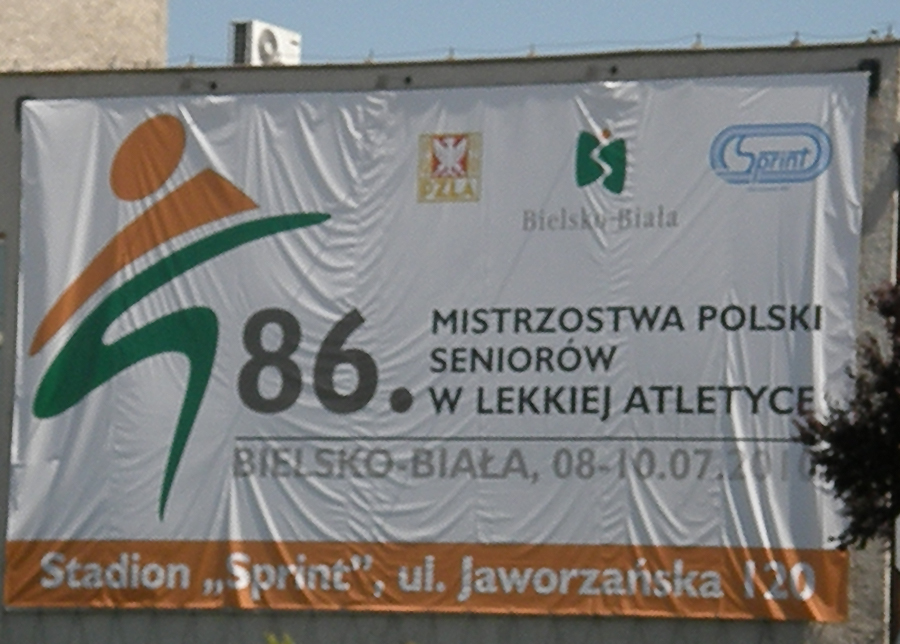
Poster promoting the 2010 championships in Bielsko-Biała

Edition	Location	Dates	Venue
1920	Lviv	16–18 July	Stadion Pogoni Lwów
1921	Lviv	13–15 August	Stadion Pogoni Lwów
1922	Warsaw	30 September–1 October	Park Sobieskiego (Note: Park Sobieskiego is now known as Agrykola Stadium in Ujazdów district.)
1923	Warsaw	25–26 August	Park Sobieskiego
1924	Warsaw	6–8 September	Park Sobieskiego
1925	Kraków; Warsaw	14–16 August (men); 17–18 July (women)	Stadion Wisły Kraków; Park Sobieskiego
1926	Warsaw	13–15 August (men); 7–8 August (women)	Park Sobieskiego
1927	Warsaw; Poznań	10–12 July (men); 16–17 July (women)	Park Sobieskiego; Stadion Warty Poznań
1928	Warsaw; Kraków	31 August–2 September (men); 1–2 September (women)	Park Sobieskiego; Stadion Wisły Kraków
1929	Poznań; Warsaw	5–7 July (men); 12–14 July (women)	Stadion Miejski; Park Sobieskiego
1930	Warsaw; Bydgoszcz	12–13 July (men); 26–27 July (women)	Park Sobieskiego; Stadion Szkoły Oficerskiej
1931	Królewska Huta; Warsaw	11–12 July (men); 18–19 July (women)	Stadion Miejski; Park Sobieskiego
1932	Warsaw; Łódź	25–26 June (men); 18–19 June (women)	Stadion Wojska Polskiego; Stadion ŁKS-u
1933	Bydgoszcz; Królewska Huta	1–2 July (men); 15–16 July (women)	Stadion Miejski; Stadion Miejski
1934	Poznań; Warsaw	5–7 July (men); 7–8 July (women)	Stadion Miejski; Park Sobieskiego
1935	Białystok; Kraków	6–7 July (men); 13–14 July (women)	Stadion „Zwierzyniec” Stadion Wisły Kraków
1936	Wilno; Łódź	26–27 September (men); 4–5 July (women)	Stadion na Pióromoncie; Stadion KS WIMA
1937	Chorzów; Bydgoszcz	3–4 July (men); 10–11 July (women)	Stadion Miejski; Stadion Miejski
1938	Warsaw; Grudziądz	23–24 July (men); 30–31 July (women)	Stadion Wojska Polskiego; Stadion Centralny im. Bronisława Malinowskiego
1939	Poznań; Chorzów	8–9 July (men); 15–16 July (women)	Stadion Miejski; Stadion Miejski
Not held 1940–1944 due to World War II
1945	Łódź	29–30 September	Stadion ŁKS-u
1946	Kraków	7–8 September	Stadion Wisły Kraków
1947	Warsaw; Katowice	12–13 July (men); 5–6 July (women)	Stadion Wojska Polskiego; Stadion Pogoni Katowice
1948	Poznań; Bydgoszcz	10–11 July (men); 10–11 July (women)	Stadion WOS; Stadion Miejski
1949	Gdańsk – Wrzeszcz; Łódź	23–24 July (men); 30–31 July (women)	Stadion Lechii; Stadion ŁKS-u
1950	Kraków	13–15 August	Stadion Wisły Kraków
1951	Warsaw	9–16 September	Stadion Wojska Polskiego
1952	Wrocław	14–17 August	Stadion Gwardii Wrocław
1953	Warsaw	4–6 September	Stadion Wojska Polskiego
1954	Warsaw	18–23 July	Stadion Wojska Polskiego
1955	Łódź	23–25 October	Stadion ŁKS-u
1956	Zabrze	30 September–1 October	Stadion Górnika Zabrze
1957	Poznań	14–16 September	Stadion im. 22 July
1958	Bydgoszcz	18–20 July	Stadion Zawiszy
1959	Gdańsk	21–23 August	Stadion Lechii
1960	Olsztyn	5–7 August	Stadion Leśny
1961	Nowa Huta	24–26 August	Stadion Suche Stawy
1962	Warsaw	20–22 July	Stadion Wojska Polskiego
1963	Bydgoszcz	23–25 August	Stadion Zawiszy
1964	Warsaw	16–19 July	Stadion Wojska Polskiego
1965	Szczecin	13–15 August	Stadion Pogoni Szczecin
1966	Poznań	4–7 August	Stadion im. 22 July
1967	Chorzów	17–20 August	Stadion Śląski
1968	Zielona Góra	12–15 September	Stadion MOSiRu
1969	Kraków	14–17 August	Stadion Wisły Kraków
1970	Warsaw	6–9 August	Stadion Skry
1971	Warsaw	26–28 June	Stadion Skry
1972	Warsaw	17–19 August	Stadion Skry
1973	Warsaw	10–12 August	Stadion Skry
1974	Warsaw	19–21 July	Stadion Skry
1975	Bydgoszcz	27–29 June	Stadion Zawiszy
1976	Bydgoszcz	25–27 June	Stadion Zawiszy
1977	Bydgoszcz	29–31 July	Stadion Zawiszy
1978	Warsaw	9–11 July	Stadion Skry
1979	Poznań	10–12 August	Stadion Olimpii Poznań
1980	Łódź	29–31 August	Stadion AZS Łódź
1981	Zabrze	6–8 August	Stadion im. Ernesta Pohla
1982	Lublin	2–4 July	Stadion Startu Lublin
1983	Bydgoszcz	25–27 June	Stadion Zawiszy
1984	Lublin	22–24 June	Stadion Startu Lublin
1985	Bydgoszcz	2–4 August	Stadion Zawiszy
1986	Grudziądz	27–29 June	Stadion Grudziądz
1987	Poznań	14–16 August	Stadion Olimpii Poznań
1988	Grudziądz	12–14 August	Stadion Grudziądz
1989	Kraków	1–3 September	Stadion AWF Kraków
1990	Piła	13–15 July	Stadion MOSiR Piła
1991	Kielce	12–14 July	Stadion Budowlanych
1992	Warsaw	19–21 June	Stadion Skry
1993	Kielce	23–25 July	Stadion Budowlanych
1994	Piła	24–26 June	Stadion MOSiR Piła
1995	Warsaw	18–20 August	Stadion Skry
1996	Piła	21–23 June	Stadion MOSiR Piła
1997	Bydgoszcz	20–22 June	Stadion Zawiszy
1998	Wrocław	26–28 June	Stadion AWF Wrocław
1999	Kraków	2–4 July	Stadion AWF Kraków
2000	Kraków	6–8 August	Stadion AWF Kraków
2001	Bydgoszcz	29 June–1 July	Stadion Zawiszy
2002	Szczecin	19–21 July	Miejski Stadion Lekkoatletyczny w Szczecinie
2003	Bielsko-Biała	4–6 July	Stadion KS Sprint
2004	Bydgoszcz	2–4 July	Stadion im. Krzyszkowiaka
2005	Biała Podlaska	24–26 June	Stadion AWF Biała Podlaska
2006	Bydgoszcz	21–23 July	Stadion im. Krzyszkowiaka
2007	Poznań	30 June–1 July	Stadion Olimpii Poznań
2008	Szczecin	4–6 July	Miejski Stadion Lekkoatletyczny w Szczecinie
2009	Bydgoszcz	31 July–2 August	Stadion im. Krzyszkowiaka
2010	Bielsko-Biała	8–10 July	Stadion KS Sprint
2011	Bydgoszcz	11–13 August	Stadion im. Krzyszkowiaka
2012	Bielsko-Biała	15–17 June	Stadion KS Sprint
2013	Toruń	19–21 July	Stadion Miejski im. G. Duneckiego
2014	Szczecin	29–31 July	Miejski Stadion Lekkoatletyczny w Szczecinie
2015	Kraków	19–21 July	Stadion AWF Kraków
2016	Bydgoszcz	24–26 June	Stadion im. Krzyszkowiaka
2017	Białystok	21–23 July	Stadion "Zwierzyniec"
2018	Lublin	20–22 July	Stadion Start Lublin
2019	Radom	23–25 August	Marshal Józef Piłsudski Athletic and Football Stadium
2020	Włocławek	28–30 August	OSiR Stadium in Włocławek
2021	Poznań	24–26 June	Stadion Olimpii Poznań
2022	Suwałki	9–11 June	Stadion lekkoatletyczny w Suwałkach
2023	Gorzów Wielkopolski	27–29 July	Athletics Stadium named after Lubuskie Olympians in Gorzow Wielkopolski
2024	Bydgoszcz	27–29 June	Zdzisław Krzyszkowiak Stadium

== Championship records ==
=== Men ===
Event	Mark	Athlete	Club	Date	Location	Championships	Ref.
100 metres	10.15	Piotr Balcerzak	Skra Warsaw	2 July 1999	Kraków	1999	
200 metres	20.43	Marcin Jędrusiński	Olimpia Poznań	21 July 2002	Szczecin	2002	
400 metres	45.11	Jakub Krzewina	WKS Śląsk Wrocław	30 July 2014	Szczecin	2014	
800 metres	1:45.70	Michał Rozmys	UKS Barnim Goleniów	22 July 2017	Białystok	2017	
1500 metres	3:37.4	Henryk Wasilewski	Orkan Poznań	31 July 1977	Bydgoszcz	1977	
5000 metres	13:36.5	Jerzy Kowol	Górnik Zabrze	31 July 1977	Bydgoszcz	1977	
10,000 metres	28:27.2	Edward Mleczko	Cracovia	27 June 1975	Bydgoszcz	1975	
5K run	13:59	Henryk Szost	WKS Grunwald Poznań	2 June 2012	Warsaw	2012	
10K run	28:55	Marcin Chabowski	WKS Flota Gdynia	6 August 2011	Gdańsk	2011	
Half marathon	1:02:45	Jan Białk	Wejher Wejherowo	29 August 1998	Brzeszcze	1998	
Marathon	2:10:34	Antoni Niemczak	WKS Śląsk Wrocław	6 kwietnia 1986	Dębno	1986	
110 m hurdles	13.25 (+1.1 m/s) =NR	Jakub Szymanski		28 June 2024	Bydgoszcz	2024	
400 metres hurdles	48.89	Paweł Januszewski	Skra Warsaw	5 August 2000	Kraków	2000	
3000 metres steeplechase	8:19.2	Bronisław Malinowski	Olimpia Grudziądz	20 July 1974	Warsaw	1974	
High jump	2.34	Michał Bieniek	AZS-AWF Wrocław	26 June 2005	Biała Podlaska	2005	
Pole vault	5.85	Piotr Lisek	OSOT Szczecin	23 July 2017	Białystok	2017	
Long jump	8.16	Krzysztof Łuczak	Piast Głogów	20 June 1997	Bydgoszcz	1997	
Triple jump	17.19	Zdzisław Hoffmann	WKS Śląsk Wrocław	27 June 1983	Bydgoszcz	1983	
Shot put	21.53	Michał Haratyk	KS AZS AWF Kraków	23 July 2017	Białystok	2017	
Discus throw	67.48	Piotr Małachowski	WKS Śląsk Wrocław	8 July 2010	Bielsko-Biała	2010	
Hammer throw	81.87	Paweł Fajdek	Agros Zamość	25 June 2016	Bydgoszcz	2016	
Javelin throw (new model)	88.09	Marcin Krukowski	Warszawianka	21 July 2017	Białystok	2017	
Javelin throw (old model)	87.54	Dariusz Adamus	WKS Śląsk Wrocław	27 June 1983	Bydgoszcz	1983	
Decathlon	8208 pts	Ryszard Skowronek	AZS Katowice	21 June 1973	Warsaw	1973	
20 km walk	1:19:14	Robert Korzeniowski	AZS-AWF Katowice	20 June 1992	Warsaw	1992	
50 km walk	3:43:55	Rafał Augustyn	Sokół Mielec	21 marca 2015	Dudince	2015	
4 × 100 m relay	39.16	Krzysztof Jabłoński; Mateusz Pluta; Marcin Nowak; Dariusz Kuć	AZS-AWF Kraków	5 July 2008	Szczecin	2008	
4 × 400 m relay	3:03.16	Marcin Jędrusiński; Jacek Bocian; Robert Maćkowiak; Piotr Rysiukiewicz	WKS Śląsk Wrocław	4 July 1999	Kraków	1999	

=== Women ===
Event	Mark	Athlete	Club	Date	Location	Championships
100 metres	10.93	Ewa Kasprzyk	Olimpia Poznań	27 June 1986	Grudziądz	1986
200 metres	22.43	Irena Szewińska	Polonia Warsaw	20 July 1974	Warsaw	1974
400 m	50.77	Natalia Kaczmarek		28 June 2024	Bydgoszcz	2024
800 m	1:58.97	Klaudia Kazimierska	25 July 2026	Białystok		
1500 metres	4:06.96	Renata Pliś	Maraton Świnoujście	17 June 2012	Bielsko-Biała	2012
3000 metres	8:58.26	Celina Sokołowska	Wisła Kraków	12 August 1979	Poznań	1979
5000 metres	15:34.87	Wioletta Janowska	AZS-AWF Kraków	2 July 2004	Bydgoszcz	2004
10,000 metres	31:52.11	Dorota Gruca	Agros Zamość	8 May 2004	Police	2004
5 km (road)	15:52	Dominika Nowakowska	LKB im. Braci Petk Lębork	2 June 2012	Warsaw	2012
10 km (road)	33:34	Iwona Lewandowska	LKS Vectra-DGS Włocławek	27 May 2012	Bielsko-Biała	2012
100 metres hurdles	12.64	Grażyna Rabsztyn	Gwardia Warsaw	11 August 1979	Poznań	1979
400 metres hurdles	54.53	Anna Jesień	AZS AWF Warsaw	25 June 2005	Biała Podlaska	2005
3000 metres steeplechase	9:35.44	Wioletta Janowska	AZS-AWF Kraków	23 July 2006	Bydgoszcz	2006
20 km walk	1:30:56	Agnieszka Dygacz	AZS-AWF Katowice	17 September 2011	Warsaw	2011
High jump	1.98	Kamila Lićwinko	Podlasie Białystok	20 July 2015	Kraków	2015
Pole vault	4.80	Anna Rogowska	SKLA Sopot	1 August 2009	Bydgoszcz	2009
Long jump	6.96	Anna Włodarczyk	AZS Warsaw	22 June 1984	Lublin	1984
Triple jump	14.27	Małgorzata Trybańska	Warszawianka	10 July 2010	Bielsko-Biała	2010
Shot put	19.58	Ludwika Chewińska	Gwardia Warsaw	26 June 1976	Bydgoszcz	1976
Discus throw	63.78	Renata Katewicz	WLKS Siedlce	26 June 1994	Piła	1994
Hammer throw	80.79	Anita Włodarczyk	RKS Skra Warsaw	23 July 2017	Białystok	2017
Javelin throw (new model)	61.05	Barbara Madejczyk	Jantar Ustka	25 June 2006	Bydgoszcz	2006
Javelin throw (old model)	62.76	Bernadetta Blechacz	Lechia Gdańsk	11 August 1979	Poznań	1979
Heptathlon	6494 pts	Kamila Chudzik	AZS-AWFiS Gdańsk	7 June 2008	Zielona Góra	2008
4 × 100 m relay	44.59	Elżbieta Brzykca; Małgorzata Dunecka; Jolanta Janota; Ewa Pisiewicz	Start Lublin	14 August 1988	Grudziądz	1988
4 × 400 m relay	3:31.33	Dominika Muraszewska; Weronika Wyka; Emilia Ankiewicz; Joanna Jóźwik	AZS AWF Warsaw	23 July 2017	Białystok	2017

== See also ==
- List of Polish records in athletics
