= Sośnicki =

Sośnicki (feminine: Sośnicka; plural: Sośniccy) is a Polish surname. Notable people with the surname include:

Language	Masculine	Feminine
Polish	Sośnicki	Sośnicka
Belarusian (Romanization)	Сасницкі (Sasnitski, Sasnicki)	Сасницкая (Sasnitskaya, Sasnitskaia, Sasnickaja)
Russian (Romanization)	Сосницкий (Sosnitskiy, Sosnitsky)	Сосницкая (Sosnitskaya, Sosnitskaia)
Ukrainian (Romanization)	Сосницький (Sosnitskyi, Sosnitskyy)	Сосницька (Sosnitska)

== People ==
- Stanisław Sośnicki (1896–1962), Polish military officer and athlete
- Zdzisława Sośnicka (born 1945), Polish singer
