= Yngvar Fyhn =

Norwegian national socialist

Yngvar Fyhn (29 October 1910 – 8 May 1945) was a Norwegian national socialist. He was leader of the National Socialist Workers' Party of Norway (NNSAP) from 1935 until 1940 when that party became defunct and he joined Nasjonal Samling (NS). Fyhn became editor of the NS-paper Hirdmannen in 1941, turning the paper more pan-Germanist, militantly national socialist with an emphasis on "socialist", with fronts against Freemasonry, Jews and capitalists. Fyhn was considered for a cabinet position in the failed pro-German coup attempt by Leif Schøren and Egil Holst Torkildsen, leaders of Germanske SS Norge, against Vidkun Quisling and NS in January 1945. Fyhn committed suicide on 8 May 1945.
