= 1920 Polish Athletics Championships =

1920 national athletics championships

- Edition: 1st
- Dates: 16–18 July 1920
- Host city: Lwów, Poland
- Venue: Edward Śmigły-Rydz Sports Park in Lviv
- Level: Senior

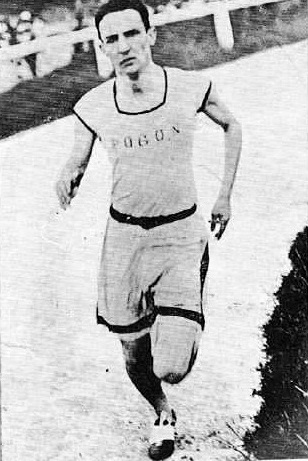
Zdzisław Latawiec, winner of three gold medals and one silver medal

The 1920 Polish Athletics Championships, known as the Main Polish Championships, were the inaugural national track and field championships held from 16 to 18 July 1920 in Lwów, Poland. The event took place at the Edward Śmigły-Rydz Sports Park in Lviv stadium. Only male athletes competed, and national titles were awarded exclusively to those who surpassed pre-established qualifying standards for the 1920 Summer Olympics in Antwerp, Belgium. Only four athletes achieved this: Stanisław Sośnicki (100 m), Wacław Kuchar (800 m), Kazimierz Cybulski (pole vault), and Sławosz Szydłowski (discus throw and javelin throw). Due to the advancing Red Army offensive during the Polish–Soviet War, Poland did not participate in the Antwerp Olympics. The championships saw eight new Polish national records set.

== Background ==
On 11 October 1919, the Polish Athletic Association was established in Kraków, becoming the first sports organization in newly independent Poland. Headquartered in Lwów, then a hub for Polish athletics, the Polish Athletic Association aimed to promote the sport and assess athletes' abilities through a national competition. Consequently, the first Polish Championships were scheduled for July 1920 in Lwów. At the time, Poland had only a few athletics clubs, located in Warsaw, Kraków, and Lwów, with just 265 registered athletes nationwide.

== Competition overview ==
The championships spanned three days, from Friday, 16 July, to Sunday, 18 July 1920. Athletes competed in 19 events, with an additional 4 × 400 m relay held, where the Polish national team set a new national record with a time of 3:41.6. The 100 m race was the most popular, with 15 athletes competing across four heats. Stanisław Sośnicki, representing Polonia Warsaw, won the most individual medals, triumphing in the 100 m, standing high jump, triple jump, long jump, and standing long jump. However, local clubs Pogoń Lwów and Czarni Lwów dominated the medal table, collectively securing 12 of the 19 gold medals. Despite setting several national records and achieving Poland's best results for the 1920 season, the performances lagged behind contemporary international standards.

== Results ==
PB – personal best | SB – season best for 1920 | NL – national leader for 1920

Event	1st place	Result	2nd place	Result	3rd place	Result
100 m	Stanisław Sośnicki; Polonia Warsaw	11.4 SB	Edward Jakubowicz; Czarni Lwów	11.8	Elgin Scott; Czarni Lwów	
200 m	Janusz Habich; Polonia Warsaw	24.2 PB SB	Edward Jakubowicz; Czarni Lwów	24.4 PB	Felicjan Sterba; Pogoń Lwów	
400 m	Felicjan Sterba; Pogoń Lwów	55.0	Janusz Habich; Polonia Warsaw	55.1 SB		
800 m	Wacław Kuchar; Pogoń Lwów	2:04.6 NR SB PB	Zdzisław Latawiec; Pogoń Lwów		Jan Baran; Pogoń Lwów	
1500 m	Zdzisław Latawiec; Pogoń Lwów	4:26.7 SB NL	Juliusz Miller; Czarni Lwów		Tadeusz Dręgiewicz; Pogoń Lwów	
3000 m	Zdzisław Latawiec; Pogoń Lwów	9:47.2 SB NL	Jan Baran; Pogoń Lwów	10:02.0 SB PB	Witold Wondrausch; Czarni Lwów	
3000 m team	Pogoń Lwów; Zdzisław Latawiec; Jan Baran-Bilewski; Tadeusz Dręgiewicz	7 pts.				
5000 m	Witold Wondrausch; Czarni Lwów	18:12.8 PB	Adam Welichowski; Pogoń Lwów			
110 m hurdles	Wacław Kuchar; Pogoń Lwów	18.0 SB PB	Edward Jakubowicz; Czarni Lwów			
4 × 100 m relay	Polonia Warsaw; Stanisław Sośnicki; Wacław Gebethner; Jan Loth; Janusz Habich	48.2 NR				
4 × 400 m relay	POL; Felicjan Sterba; Wacław Kuchar; Edward Jakubowicz; Janusz Habich	3:41.6 NR				
High jump	Tadeusz Kirchner; Czarni Lwów	1.555	Stanisław Sośnicki; Polonia Warsaw	1.50		
Standing high jump	Stanisław Sośnicki; Polonia Warsaw	1.26	Wacław Kuchar; Pogoń Lwów			
Pole vault	Kazimierz Cybulski; Pogoń Lwów	3.21 = NR SB = PB NL	Leszek Pawłowski; Czarni Lwów	3.10 SB PB	Wacław Kuchar; Pogoń Lwów	
Long jump	Stanisław Sośnicki; Polonia Warsaw	6.19	Wacław Kuchar; Pogoń Lwów	6.13		
Standing long jump	Stanisław Sośnicki; Polonia Warsaw	2.87	Kazimierz Cybulski; Pogoń Lwów	2.82	Sławosz Szydłowski; Pogoń Lwów	
Triple jump	Stanisław Sośnicki; Polonia Warsaw	12.68 NR SB PB NL	Wacław Kuchar; Pogoń Lwów	12.18		
Shot put	Kazimierz Cybulski; Pogoń Lwów	11.25 NR SB = PB NL	Sławosz Szydłowski; Pogoń Lwów		Tadeusz Kirchner; Czarni Lwów	
Discus throw	Sławosz Szydłowski; Pogoń Lwów	37.75 NR SB PB NL	Kazimierz Cybulski; Pogoń Lwów		Tadeusz Kirchner; Czarni Lwów	
Javelin throw	Sławosz Szydłowski; Pogoń Lwów	48.40 NR SB PB NL	Tadeusz Kirchner; Czarni Lwów			

== Medal table ==
Medals were awarded to athletes from only three clubs, with Pogoń Lwów leading the tally by securing 24 medals.

Rank	Club	(gold) Gold	(silver) Silver	(bronze) Bronze	Total
1	Pogoń Lwów	10	9	5	24
2	Polonia Warsaw	7	2	0	9
3	Czarni Lwów	2	6	4	12
