= Christina Hardyment =

British writer

- Born: 1946 (age 79–80)
- Education: Newnham College, Cambridge
- Occupations: author, journalist
- Spouse: Tom Griffith (1969-1991 div.)
- Children: 4 daughters
- Parents: Eiliv Odde Hauge (father); Dinah Hardyment née McNabb (mother)
- Website: www.christinahardyment.co.uk

Christina Hardyment (born 1946) is a British writer who has written on a wide range of subjects including parenting, food, gardens, children's books, domestic life, and British history.

== Personal life ==
Hardyment has lived mainly in England, save for a few years in South Africa, from 1951 to 1953. After completing university, she learned that her father was Norwegian writer and soldier Eiliv Odde Hauge, which led her to contact her Norwegian relatives and establish connections. She married Tom Griffith in 1969. They had four daughters, and ten grandchildren. Though on good terms, they divorced in 1991.

From 1989 to 2000 she was the founder Editor of the University of Oxford's alumni magazine Oxford Today (now edited online as Quod by Richard Lofthouse).

Her two books about Arthur Ransome inspired The Arthur Ransome Society, and she is now the Senior Executor of the Arthur Ransome Literary Estate.

Hardyment is the author of numerous books on social history and literary geography. In 2005, her biography of Sir Thomas Malory, the author of the Morte Darthur was published by HarperCollins.

Between 2015 and 2018 she edited three literary anthologies on "The Pleasures of Gardening", "The Pleasures of Nature" and The Pleasures of the Table.

Her most recent books are Writing the Thames, published in 2016, which is about the River Thames in literature and history, and Novel Houses: Twenty legendary Literary dwellings', published in 2018.

She lives in Oxford, reveling in gardening and enjoying sailing and punting on the River Thames.

== Works ==
- 1983: Dream Babies: Child Care from Locke to Spock, London: Jonathan Cape ISBN 978-0224019101
  - reprint 1984 Dream Babies: Three Centuries of Good Advice on Child Care, HarperCollins ISBN 978-0060911614
  - reprint 1995 Perfect Parents: Baby-care Advice from Past to Present, Oxford Paperbacks 2nd Ed. ISBN 978-0192861726
  - reprint 2007 and 2012 Dream Babies: Childcare Advise from John Locke to Gina Ford, London: Frances Lincoln ISBN 978-0711227996
- 1984: Arthur Ransome and Captain Flint's Trunk, London: Jonathan Cape ISBN 0224029894
- 1987: The Canary-coloured Cat: One Family's Search for Storybook Europe, William Heinemann ISBN 978-0434313532
- 1988: From Mangle to Microwave: The Mechanization of Household Work, Cambridge: Polity Press ISBN 978-0745602066
- 1992: Home Comfort: A History of Domestic Arrangements, London: Viking and the National Trust ISBN 0670823651
- 1995: Slice of Life: The British way of Eating Since 1945, London: BBC Books ISBN 0563370874
- 1997: (with Peter Jeffrey e.a.) The Christmas Collection, Naxos Audio Books, audio CD ISBN 978-9626341490
- 1998: The Future of the Family, Orion ISBN 978-0297840787
- 1999: On the Writer's Trail: 20 Great Literary Journeys, Natopnal Trust ISBN 978-0707803814
- 2000: Behind the Scenes: Domestic Arrangements in Historic Houses, Abrams ISBN 978-0810963436
- 2000: Literary Trails: British Writers in Their Landscapes, Abrams ISBN 978-0810967052
- 2005: Malory: The Knight Who Became King Arthur's Chronicler, London: HarperCollins ISBN 978-0060935290
- 2006: Poetry for the Winter Season (selected and completed by Christina Hardyment), Naxos Audio Books, abridged audio CD ISBN 978-9626344262 ; idem 2019: unabridged audio CD
- 2010: University of Oxford: The Official Guide, University of Oxford ISBN 978-0956624406
- 2012: Writing Britain: Wastelands to Wonderlands, London: British Library ISBN 978-0712358743
- 2012: The World of Arthur Ransome, Frances Lincoln ISBN 978-0711232976
- 2014: Pleasures of the Garden: A Literary Anthology, London: British Library ISBN 978-0712357203
- 2015: Pleasures of the Table: A Literary Anthology, London: British Library ISBN 978-0712357807
- 2016: Pleasures of Nature: A Literary Anthology, London: British Library ISBN 978-0712357685
- 2016: Writing the Thames, Bodleian Library ISBN 978-1851244508
- 2018: Novel Houses: Twenty Famous Fictional Dwellings, Bodleian Library ISBN 978-1851244805
- 2018: Arthur Ransome; Christina Hardyment (introduction): The Elixir of Life, Arthur Ransome Trust ISBN 978-0995568129
- 2022: Alyce Chaucer 1. The Serpent of Division, Oxford: Haugetun ISBN 978-1739198015
- 2023: Alyce Chaucer 2. The Book of the Duchess, Oxford: Haugetun ISBN 978-1739198046
- 2024: Alyce Chaucer 3. Murder Will Out, Oxford: Haugetun ISBN 978-1739198077
- 2024: (with Clare Wille) The Serpent of Division Whole Story Audio Books, unabridged Audio CD ISBN 978-1004146697
