= Andrzej Nowicki =

Andrzej Nowicki may refer to:

- Andrzej Nowicki (philosopher) (1919-2011), Grand Orient of Poland
- Andrzej Nowicki (writer) (1909-1986)
