= Halvard Storm =

Norwegian artist

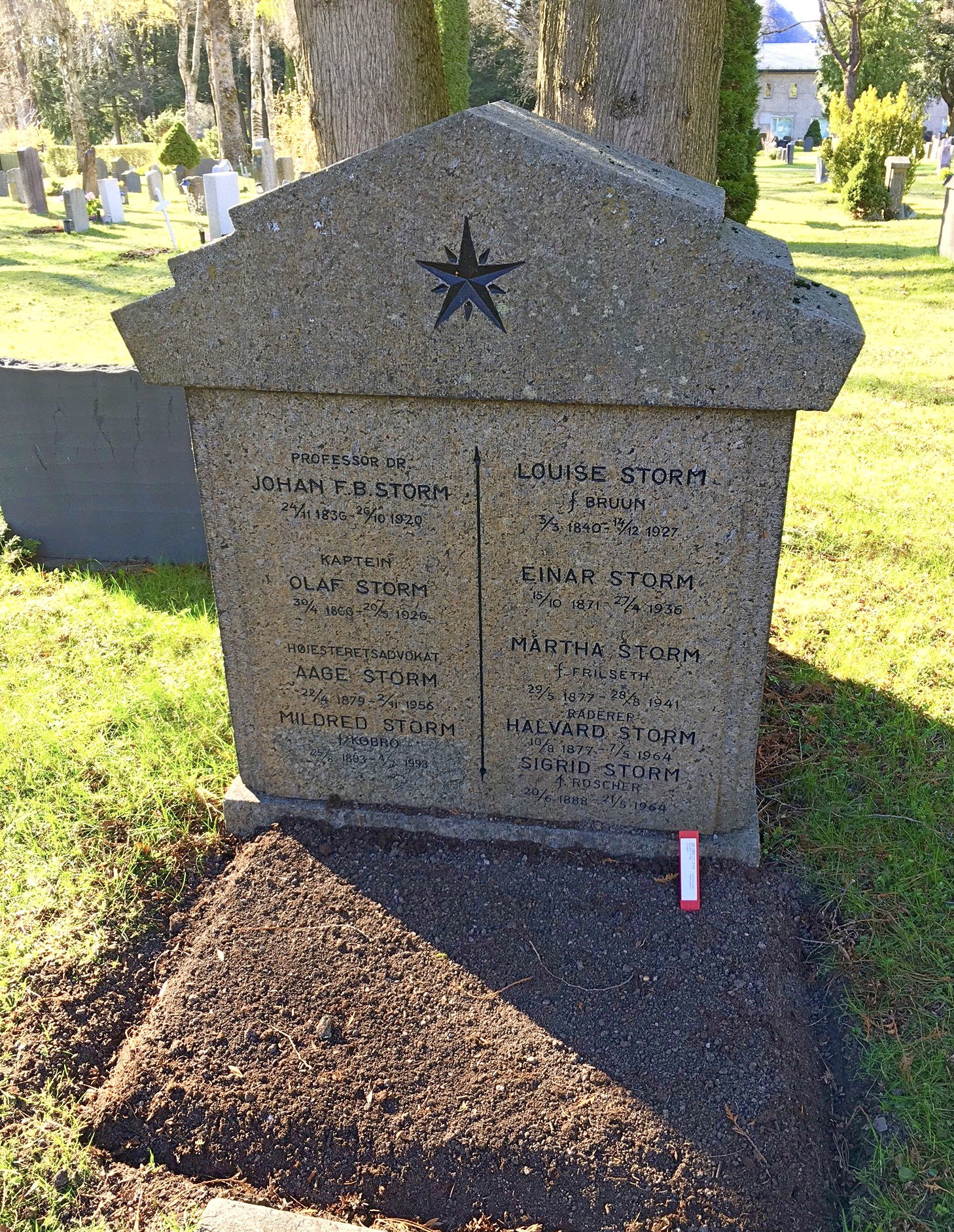
Halvard Storm Headstone, Photo by Tara Dolgner

Halvard Storm (August 10, 1877 - May 7, 1964) was a 20th-century Norwegian artist.

== Biography ==
Storm was born in Kristiania (Oslo), the eighth of nine children born to linguistics professor Johan Storm and Louise Bruun, and was christened on September 2, 1877. He attended the Norwegian National Academy of Craft and Art during 1898-1899, where he took courses in decorative painting, freehand, and ornament art. He immigrated to the United States in 1901 and settled in the vibrant Norwegian-American enclve of Bay Ridge, Brooklyn, New York. He married Martha Louise Trilseth (born May 29, 1877, Eidsvoll, Norway) on February 10, 1906, at Our Savior's Lutheran Church in Brooklyn. He registered for the US World War I draft in September 1918 as all eligible men were requird to register regardless of citizenship. In the 1920s, he returned to Norway to live, but he traveled to the United States many times during subsequent decades. Storm's wife died on August 28, 1941, and he later married Sigrid Roscher (1888-1964). Storm died on May 7, 1964, and is buried alongside his parents, three brothers, and both wives in Oslo's Vestre Gravlund. A black-and- white photo of Storm was published in the Norwegian magazine "Aktuell" (Oslo),1952 Vol. 8 Nr. 16, page 27.

== Artist ==
Storm is most well known for his etchings of Norwegian landscapes, towns, and architecture. He also etched portraits and illustrated books, and owned an art and framing store in Oslo. Two of his pieces, "Sam’s Point, Cragsmoor" and "Cragsmoor," were exhibited at the 1920 Society of Independent Artists in New York. In the 1940s, Storm's art was shown in New York, Chicago, and Minneapolis, as well in Australia. He is listed in Who was Who in American Art, 1540–1975. He signed his name, along with the year, on the bottom right corner of his pieces. Today, Storm's work is sought after for its authentic depiction of traditional Norwegian scenes from the last century.
