= Oflag X-C =

World War II German prisoner-of-war camp

- Lübeck, Schleswig-Holstein
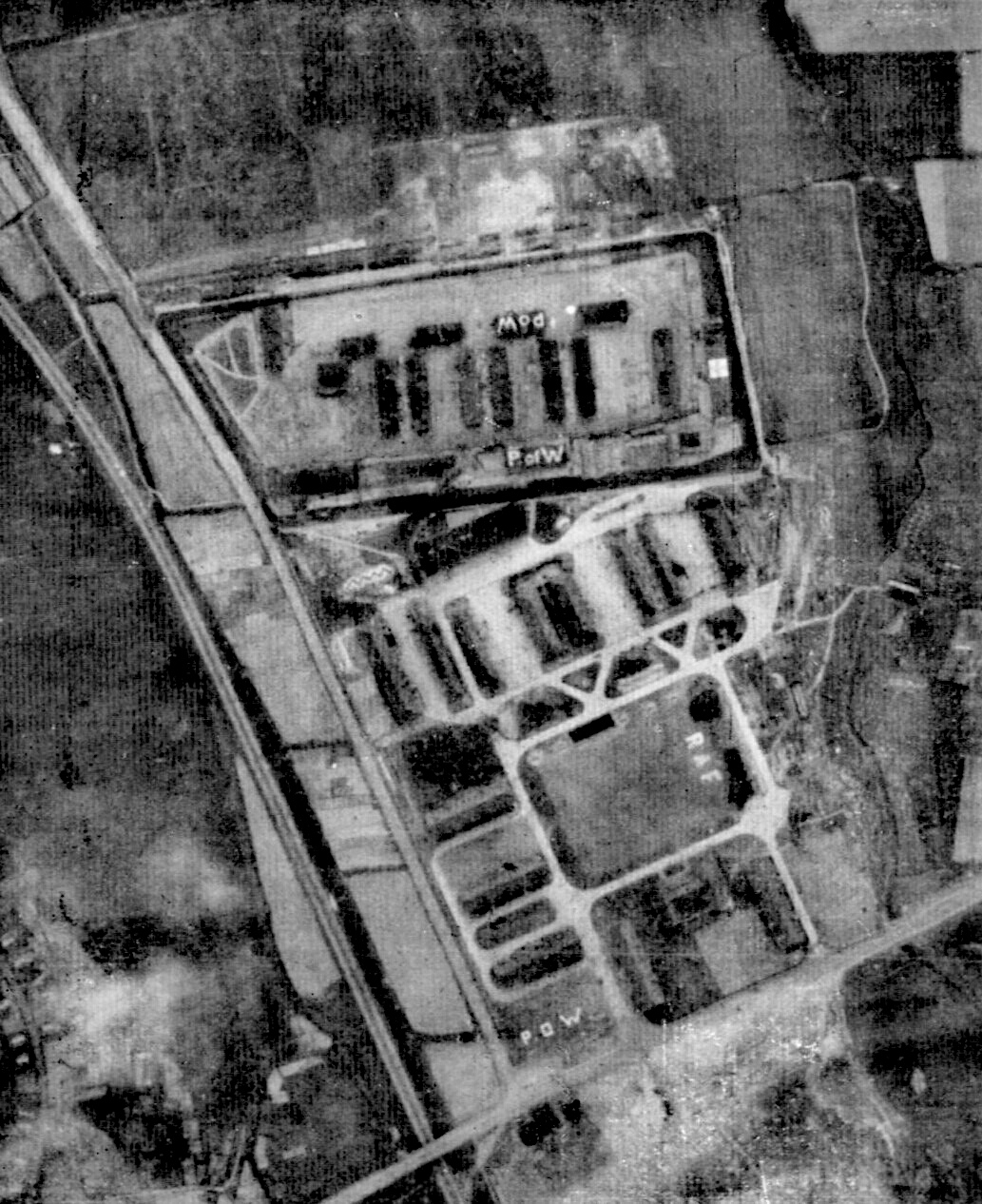
- Aerial image of Oflag X-C, taken by a US airplane on April 26, 1945

Site information
- Type: Prisoner-of-war camp
- Controlled by: Nazi Germany

Location
- Lübeck, Germany (pre-war borders, 1937)
- Coordinates: 53.89962°N 10.67665°E

Site history
- In use: 1940–1945
- Battles/wars: World War II

Garrison information
- Occupants: French, British, Polish and other Allied officers

Oflag X-C was a German World War II prisoner-of-war camp for officers (Offizierlager) in Lübeck in northern Germany. The camp was located on the corner of Friedhofsallee and Vorwerkstrasse, close to Lübeck's border with the town of Schwartau (now Bad Schwartau), and is often cited as being located in Schwartau rather than Lübeck. It housed French, British, Polish and other Allied officers.

== Camp history ==
The camp was opened in June 1940 for French officers captured during the Battle of France. In June 1941 British and Commonwealth officers from the Battle of Crete and the North African Campaign arrived. During 1941 and 1942 many Allied air crews that had been shot down were taken to Lübeck, then later transferred to Oflag VI-B, Warburg In mid-1942 many Polish officers were relocated to the Oflag II-D camp. In early 1945 Polish Officers, inmates of Oflag II-D and Oflag II-C, were marched westwards and finally reached Oflag X-C. The camp was liberated on 2 May 1945 by troops of the British 2nd Army. Prisoners of war were repatriated during May 1945 (Operation Exodus).

== Prominent prisoners ==
- Robert Blum (businessman), the son of Léon Blum
- Fernand Braudel, French historian, relocated in June 1942 from Oflag XII-B under the suspicion of Gaullist involvement
- Yves Congar, French theologian, placed as a POW at the Lübeck fortress because of his numerous escape attempts from other camps after being captured while serving as an officer in the French army.
- Władysław Dobrowolski, Polish Olympic medalist in fencing
- Yakov Dzhugashvili, the son of Joseph Stalin, captured in July 1941 at the Battle of Smolensk, died in the Sachsenhausen concentration camp in April 1943
- Stanisław Sośnicki, Polish Olympic athlete

== See also ==
- List of prisoner-of-war camps in Germany
- Oflag
- Operation Exodus (WWII operation)
