= Oflag II-C =

World War II German prisoner-of-war camp

- Woldenberg, Brandenburg (now Dobiegniew, Poland)
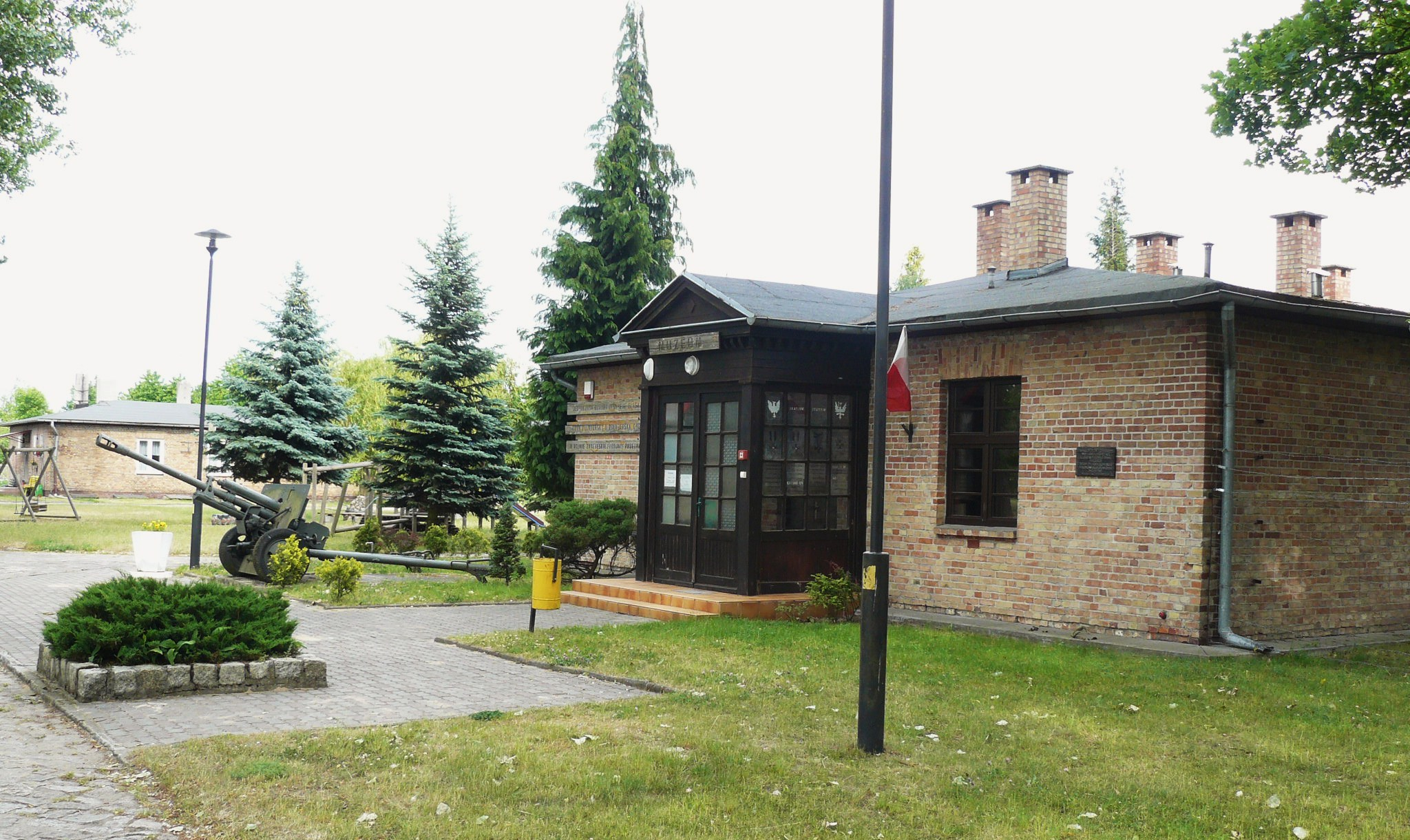
- Former Oflag II-C, now a museum

Site information
- Type: Prisoner-of-war camp
- Controlled by: Nazi Germany

Location
- Woldenberg, Germany, (pre-war borders, 1937) Oflag II-C (Germany)
- Coordinates: 52°57′26″N 15°44′14″E

Site history
- In use: 1939–1945
- Battles/wars: World War II

Garrison information
- Occupants: Polish officers

Oflag II-C Woldenburg was a German World War II prisoner-of-war camp located about 1 kilometre (0.62 mi) from the town of Woldenberg, Brandenburg (now Dobiegniew, western Poland). The camp housed Polish officers and orderlies and had an area of 25 hectares (62 acres) with 25 brick huts for prisoners and another six for kitchens, class-rooms, theater, and administration. Now it houses a museum.

== Camp history ==
Work on the camp began in October 1939 when 500 Polish prisoners from the September campaign arrived to build the camp, and who lived initially in tents. In May 1940 as the building work progressed small groups of Polish officers were transferred in from other POW camps. In July 1941 a group of officer-cadets (podchorąży) were brought from Stalag II-A. They were divided among the 25 huts to work as orderlies, in addition to the lower ranks that were already doing this work. In April 1942 the last group of Polish officers arrived from Oflag X-C near Lübeck. The number of inmates reached its peak of 5,944 officers and 796 orderlies. In October 1944 some 100 higher-ranking officers of the underground Polish Home Army arrived after the German suppression of the Warsaw Uprising.

On 28 January 1945 the POWs were assembled and marched westward, but after two days they were liberated by the Soviet Red Army. The exception was a group of sick officers evacuated to Oflag II-A, which they reached on 17 March 1945. They were liberated there along with fellow sick Belgian officers on 27 April 1945.

=== Escapes ===
There were several escape attempts, but only two were successful. In early 1942 three officers managed to hide inside empty boxes in a truck that was unloading food supplies. They were successful. On Christmas Eve 1942 a number of officers arranged a fight outside one of the huts. While the guards were engaged in breaking up the fight, toward which the searchlights were all directed, three officers managed to cut through the barbed wire and escape from the camp. A larger scale attempt was unsuccessful. In 1943 a tunnel was being dug from a hut closest to the wires. About 150 officers were preparing to get out through it. Unfortunately, as the tunnel was within a few metres of its end it was discovered.

In 1945, Wojciech Trojanowski escaped during the evacuation of the camp.

=== Cultural life ===
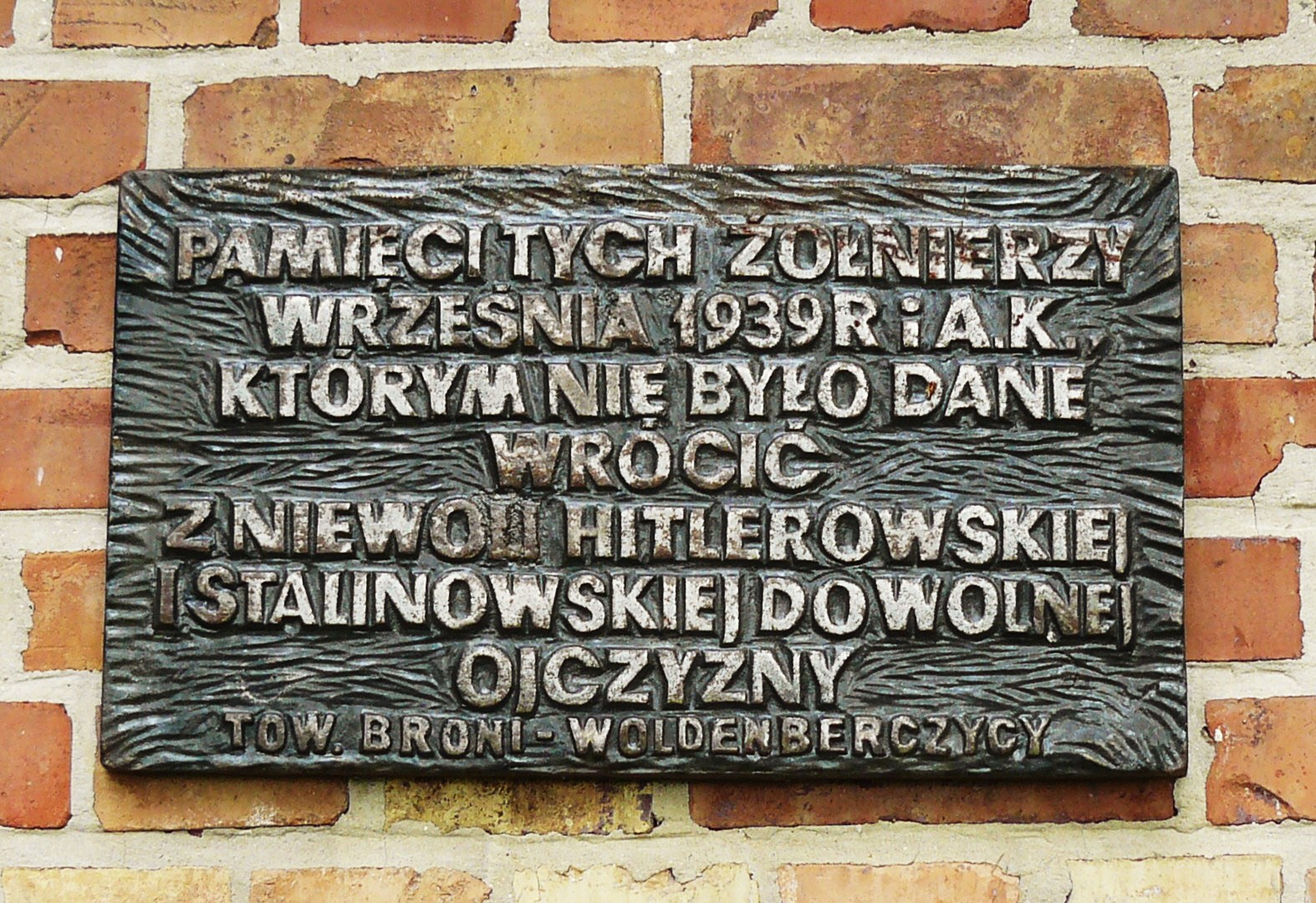
Memorial plaque at the former POW camp

Cultural life in the camp was very extensive. A large number of classes were conducted by the 80 officers who were professors or teachers in civilian life. These classes included philosophy and law, as well as French and English. Mathematics was taught by the architect Professor Jerzy Hryniewiecki. A number of the prisoners were able to complete full university courses which were recognized after the war.

In the theater a number of plays were presented by two professional directors - Kazimierz Rudzki and Jan Kocher. Some new plays were written, including a three-act drama called Mały ("The Little One") written by Andrzej Nowicki. There was also a symphony orchestra under the direction of Józef Klonowski.

In 1942 a secret radio receiver was built and the news distributed throughout the camp in newsletters. Units of the Polish Home Army from Piła and Krzyż secretly maintained contact with the POWs and the former smuggled Polish underground press into the camp.

=== 1944 POW Olympics ===
Thirteen pre-war Polish Olympics competitors were held in the camp. In the summer of 1944 the prisoners were granted permission to stage an unofficial POW Olympics from July 23 to August 13. An Olympic Flag was made with a bed sheet, and pieces of colored scarves was raised.

== Notable inmates ==
- Tadeusz Adamowski, born in Switzerland, raised in the United States, ice hockey player for Poland in 1928 Olympics.
- Stefan Flukowski, writer, poet and translator
- Stanisław Horno-Popławski, Polish painter, sculptor and pedagogue.
- Franciszek Kawa, Olympic cross-country skier
- Ryszard Koncewicz, football player
- Adam Kowalski, Olympic hockey player
- Kazimierz Laskowski, Olympic medalist in fencing
- Witalis Ludwiczak, Olympic ice hockey player, lawyer
- Kazimierz Michałowski, archaeologist, art historian
- Ignacy Misiąg, infantry colonel
- Franciszek Niepokólczycki, colonel, co-organizer of Kedyw
- Andrzej Nowicki, poet and satirical writer.
- Kazimierz Rudzki, actor
- Jan Rzepecki, military historian, colonel
- Stanisław Sośnicki, Olympic athlete
- Kazimierz Szempliński, Olympic fencer
- Janusz Ślązak, Olympic medalist in rowing
- Kazimierz Świtalski, politician, Prime Minister of Poland
- Wojciech Trojanowski, Olympic athlete
- Józef Unrug, admiral

== See also ==
- List of prisoner-of-war camps in Germany
- Oflag
