= Kazimierz Szempliński =

Polish fencer (1899–1971)

Personal information
- Born: Kazimierz Włodzimierz Szempliński; 7 January 1899 Warsaw, Congress Poland
- Died: 12 February 1971 (aged 72) Warsaw, Polish People's Republic
- Resting place: Wolski Cemetery
- Military career
- Branch: Polish Armed Forces
- Rank: Major
- Unit: Łódź Army
- Conflicts: Polish-Soviet War; World War II; September Campaign

Sport
- Country: Second Polish Republic
- Sport: Fencing

Kazimierz Włodzimierz Szempliński (7 January 1899 – 12 February 1971) was a Polish fencer, Army Major, resistance fighter and former prisoner of war. Szempliński competed in the team épée event at the 1936 Summer Olympics.

From November 1919 he was a member of Polish Armed Forces. Szempliński fought in the Polish-Soviet War and then in the September Campaign of World War II. During the latter, he served in the Łódź Army and fought at Sieradz and Warsaw. Afterwards, he was held by the Germans in the Oflag II-C prisoner-of-war camp.

== Family ==
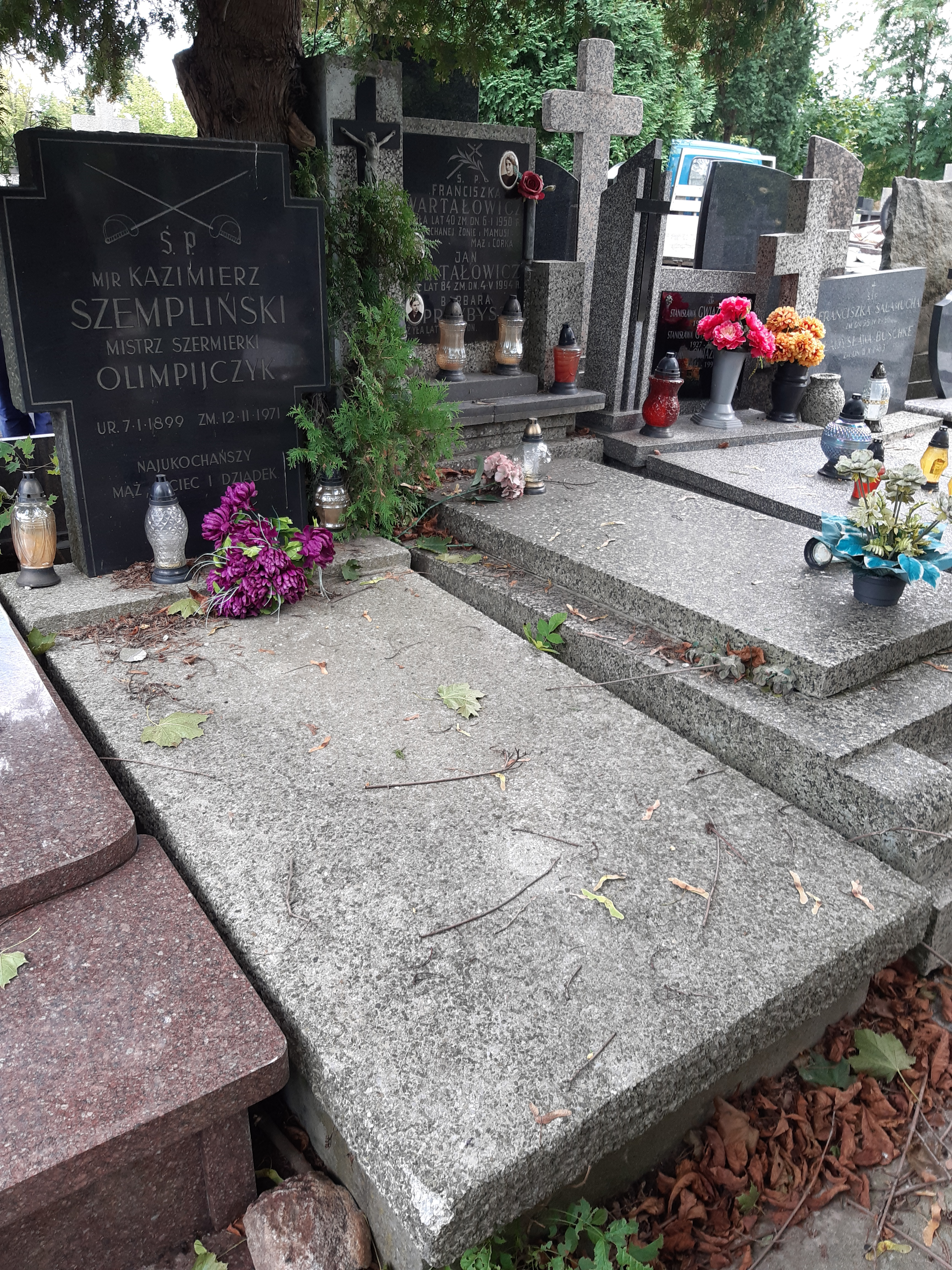
Szempliński's grave at Wolski Cemetery, Warsaw

Szempliński was the cousin of Elżbieta Szemplińska-Sobolewska, a poet, prose writer and painter, and Stefan Szempliński (1913–1997), a journalist and Polish Underground State platoon commander.
