= National Socialist Workers' Party of Norway =

National Socialist Workers' Party of Norway Norges Nasjonalsocialistiske Arbeiderparti
- Leader: Adolf Egeberg (1930–33); Yngvar Fyhn (1935–40)
- Founded: 1930
- Dissolved: 1940
- Merged into: Nasjonal Samling
- Newspaper: Fronten (1932–34); Nasjonalsocialisten (1934–35)
- Ideology: Nazism
- Political position: Far-right

The National Socialist Workers' Party of Norway (Norwegian: Norges Nasjonalsocialistiske Arbeiderparti, NNSAP) was a minor extraparliamentary political party in Norway. The party was founded in 1930, and dissolved in May 1940.

== History ==
Ideologically modelled on the German Nazi Party (NSDAP), and espousing a pan-Germanic current, many members of the party, and notably the founder and first leader Adolf Egeberg had organisational and personal ties to the NSDAP and the SS. Founded as a Nazi "cell" in 1930, the party gained financing from Eugen Nielsen, publisher of Fronten, from 1932 until a schism in 1934 due to conflict over Nielsen's primarily anti-Masonic focus, with the party seeking to develop its national socialist ideology.

In early 1933, the NNSAP saw a surge of Oslo gymnasium students joining the party, and according to the rival communist Mot Dag movement the NNSAP briefly became the leading student organisation in the city. The party had around a thousand members at its height, but was quickly overshadowed by Nasjonal Samling (NS), which was founded by Vidkun Quisling in May 1933. Several of the party's original and early members, including Egeberg, as well as Egil Holst Torkildsen, Stein Barth-Heyerdahl and Eiliv Odde Hauge at some point left the party to join NS. The surge in the NNSAP had reportedly played a key role in pushing forward the formation of Nasjonal Samling itself, because Egeberg had allowed Walter Fürst to use the NNSAP's development and threats of contesting the 1933 parliamentary election as pressure against Quisling (then a member of the Farmers' Party), who initially hesitated to form a new party. The NNSAP was led by Yngvar Fyhn from 1935 until 1940, when he followed suit and joined NS.

Despite being modelled on the NSDAP, the National Socialist Workers' Party of Norway has been described as a relatively loosely organised association. During the German occupation of Norway, former members of the NNSAP were considered to be the most able Norwegian agents for the German secret services. Many former members who later joined NS continued to be more pro-German, and less loyal to Quisling.

== See also ==
- National Socialist Movement of Norway
