= Stein Barth-Heyerdahl =

Norwegian art painter and Nazi

Stein Barth-Heyerdahl (12 July 1909 – 28 August 1984) was a Norwegian art painter and Nazi. A reluctant member of Nasjonal Samling (NS) briefly after its founding in 1933–34 and from 1941, he was mostly active in the National Socialist Workers' Party of Norway (NNSAP) during the 1930s. He was editor of the short-lived NNSAP-paper Nasjonalsocialisten in 1934–35. Barth-Heyerdahl lived in Berlin for extended periods during World War II, and became part of the circle around the NS-critical periodical Ragnarok, which espoused pan-German and neopagan ideologies. Along with Per Imerslund, he was one of Norway's strongest proponents of racialist pagan ideas.
