= Wojciech Trojanowski =

Polish hurdler (1904–1988)

Personal information
- Nationality: Polish
- Born: 25 September 1904 Kraków, Austria-Hungary
- Died: 16 June 1988 (aged 83) London, Great Britain

Sport
- Sport: Track and field
- Event: 110 metres hurdles

Wojciech Trojanowski (25 September 1904 – 16 June 1988) was a Polish hurdler. He competed in the men's 110 metres hurdles at the 1928 Summer Olympics.

His club was AZS Warsaw.

Trojanowski fought in the defence of Warsaw against the German invasion of Poland at the start of World War II. Afterwards, he was held by the Germans in the Oflag XI-B and Oflag II-C prisoner-of-war camps. He escaped German captivity in January 1945, during an evacuation of the Oflag II-C camp.
