= Vestre gravlund =

Cemetery in Oslo, Norway

Vestre Gravlund
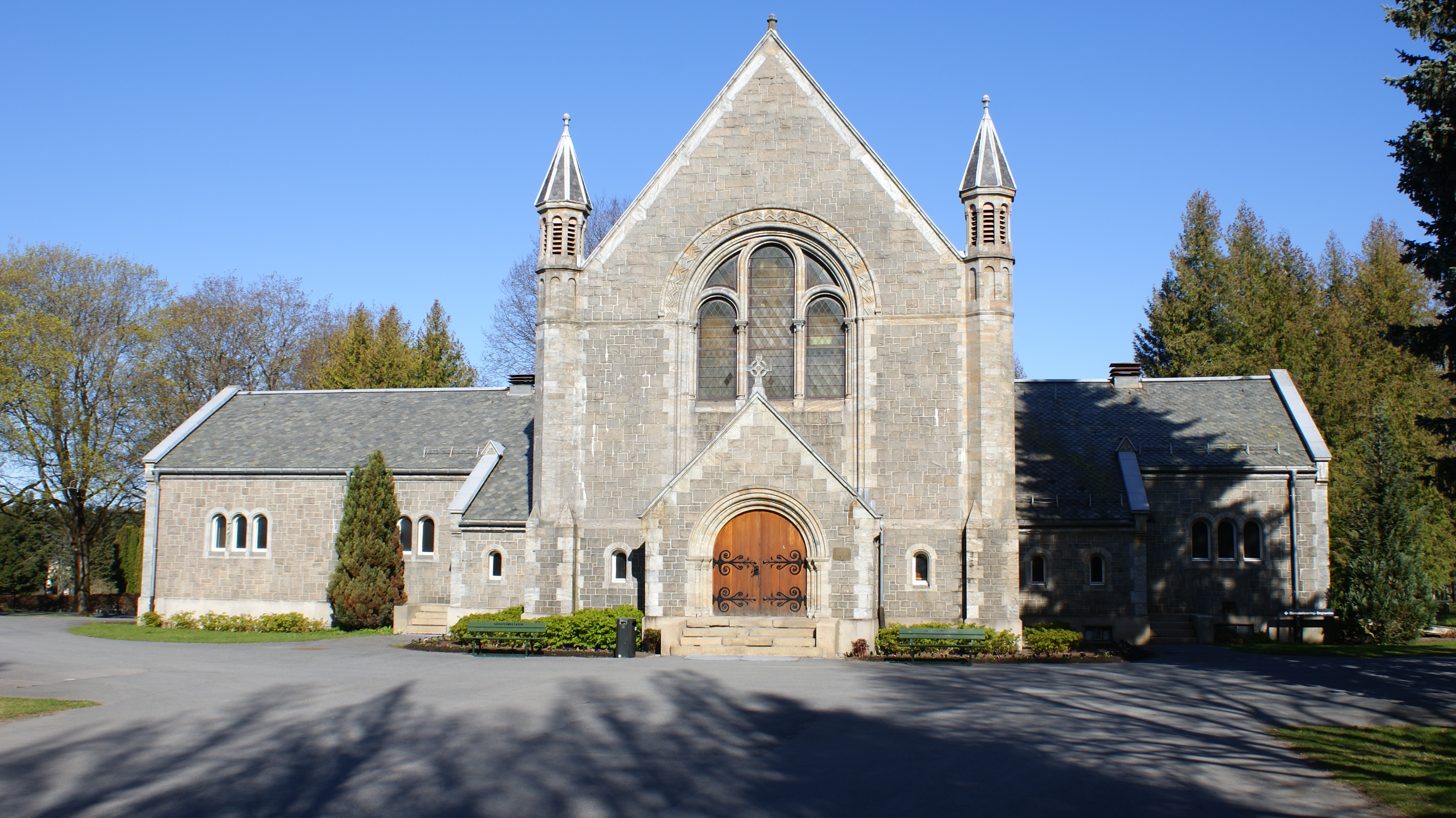
- Vestre Gravlund chapel
- Interactive map of Vestre Gravlund

Details
- Established: 1902
- Location: Frogner borough, Oslo
- Country: Norway
- Coordinates: 59°55′54″N 10°41′50″E
- Size: 60 acres (24 ha)
- Find a Grave: Vestre Gravlund

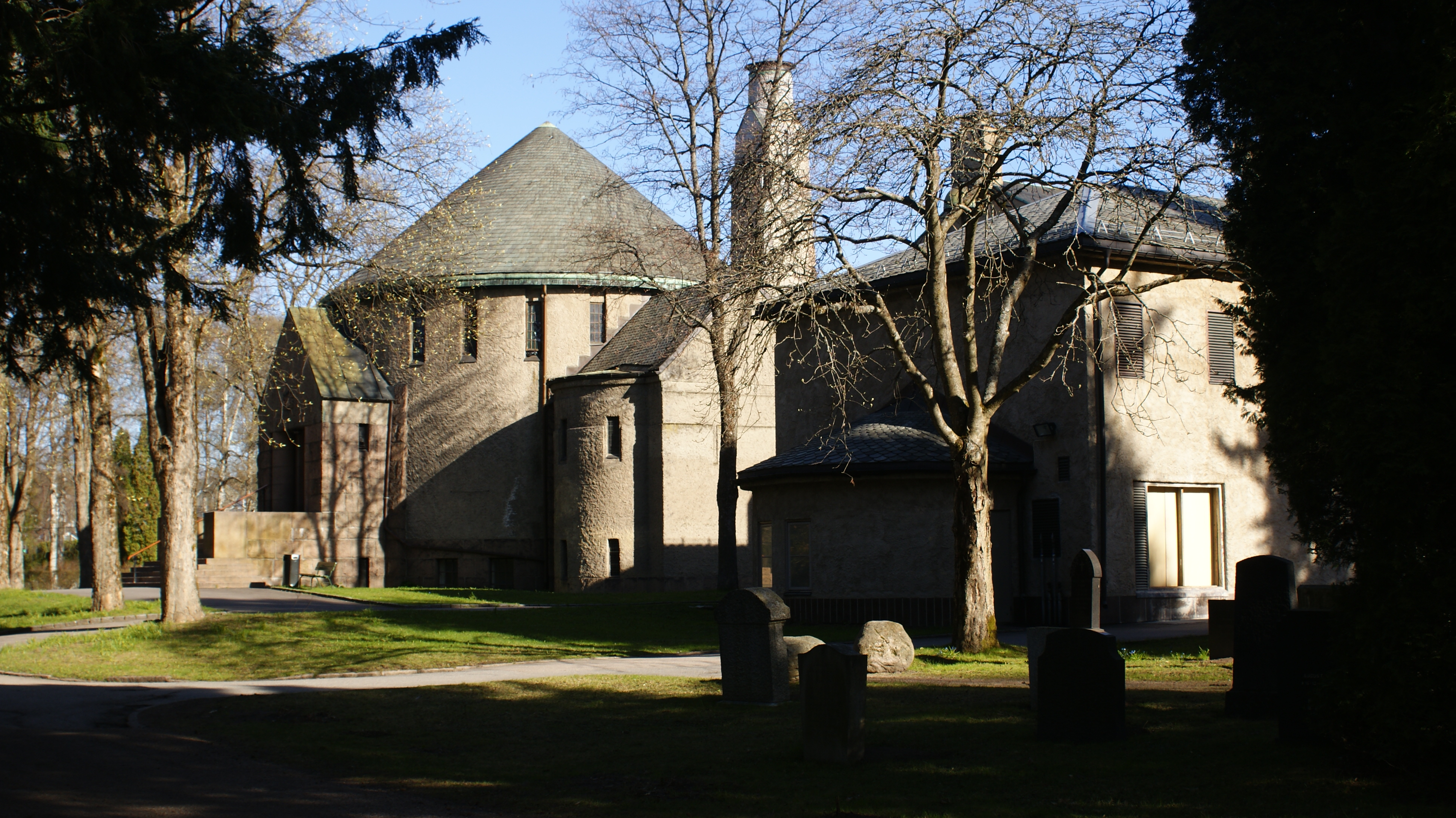
Vestre gravlund crematorium

Vestre Gravlund is a cemetery in the Frogner borough of Oslo, Norway. It is located next to the Borgen metro station. At 60 acres (0.24 km^{2}), it is the largest cemetery in Norway. It was inaugurated in September 1902 and also contains a crematorium (Vestre krematorium) and chapel (Gravkapellet).

The grave chapel was constructed in granite and clay stone and was designed by architect Alfred Christian Dahl (1857–1940). It was built in 1900 and consecrated in 1902. In the foundation wall, it has stained glass that was designed by artist Oddmund Kristiansen (1920–1997) in 1970.

== Notable interments ==
- Sven Arntzen (1897–1976), barrister
- Per Aabel (1902–1999), actor
- Eyvind Alnæs (1872–1932), composer
- Finn Alnaes (1932–1991), novelist
- Lasse Aasland (1926–2001), politician
- Gunnar Andersen (1890–1968), footballer and ski jumper
- Karsten Andersen (1920–1997), composer
- Johan Anker (1871–1940), sailor
- Kristian Birkeland (1867–1917), physicist and inventor
- André Bjerke (1918–1985), writer and poet
- Trygve Bratteli (1910–1984), prime minister
- Edith Carlmar (1911–2003), actress and director
- Lalla Carlsen (1889–1967), actress and singer
- Johan Castberg (1862–1926), politician and jurist
- Halfdan Christensen (1873–1950), actor and director
- Sven Elvestad (1884–1934), journalist and author
- Alfred Eriksen (1918–1991), Olympic fencer
- Erling Falk (1887–1940), author and politician
- Kirsten Flagstad (1895–1962), opera singer (unmarked headstone)
- Ragnar Frisch (1895–1973), economist
- Erland Frisvold (1877–1971), politician and colonel
- Einar Gerhardsen (1897–1987), prime minister
- Gregers Gram (1917–1944), resistance fighter and saboteur
- Kjell Hallbing (1934–2004), writer
- Gunvor Hofmo (1921–1995), poet and writer
- Leif Juster (1910–1995), comedian
- Franciszek Kawa (1901–1985), Polish cross-country skier
- Janina Zagrodzka-Kawa (1918–2020), Polish poet
- Casey Kasem (1932–2014), actor, voice actor and radio celebrity
- Otto Richard Kierulf (1825–1897), military officer, politician and sports administrator
- Ada Kramm (1899–1981), actress
- Martin Linge (1894–1941), actor and army captain
- Gerda Ring (1891–1999), stage actress and producer
- Inger Sitter (1929–2015), painter and art instructor
- Adolf Bredo Stabell (1908–1996), diplomat
- Halvard Storm (1877–1964), 20th century artist/etcher of Norwegian landscapes
- Carl Stoermer (1874–1957), mathematician and geophysicist
- Olav Sundal (1899–1978), Olympic gymnast
- Gunnar Tolnæs (1879–1940), actor
- Egil Holst Torkildsen (1916–1979), Nazi editor and activist

== British Commonwealth Graves ==
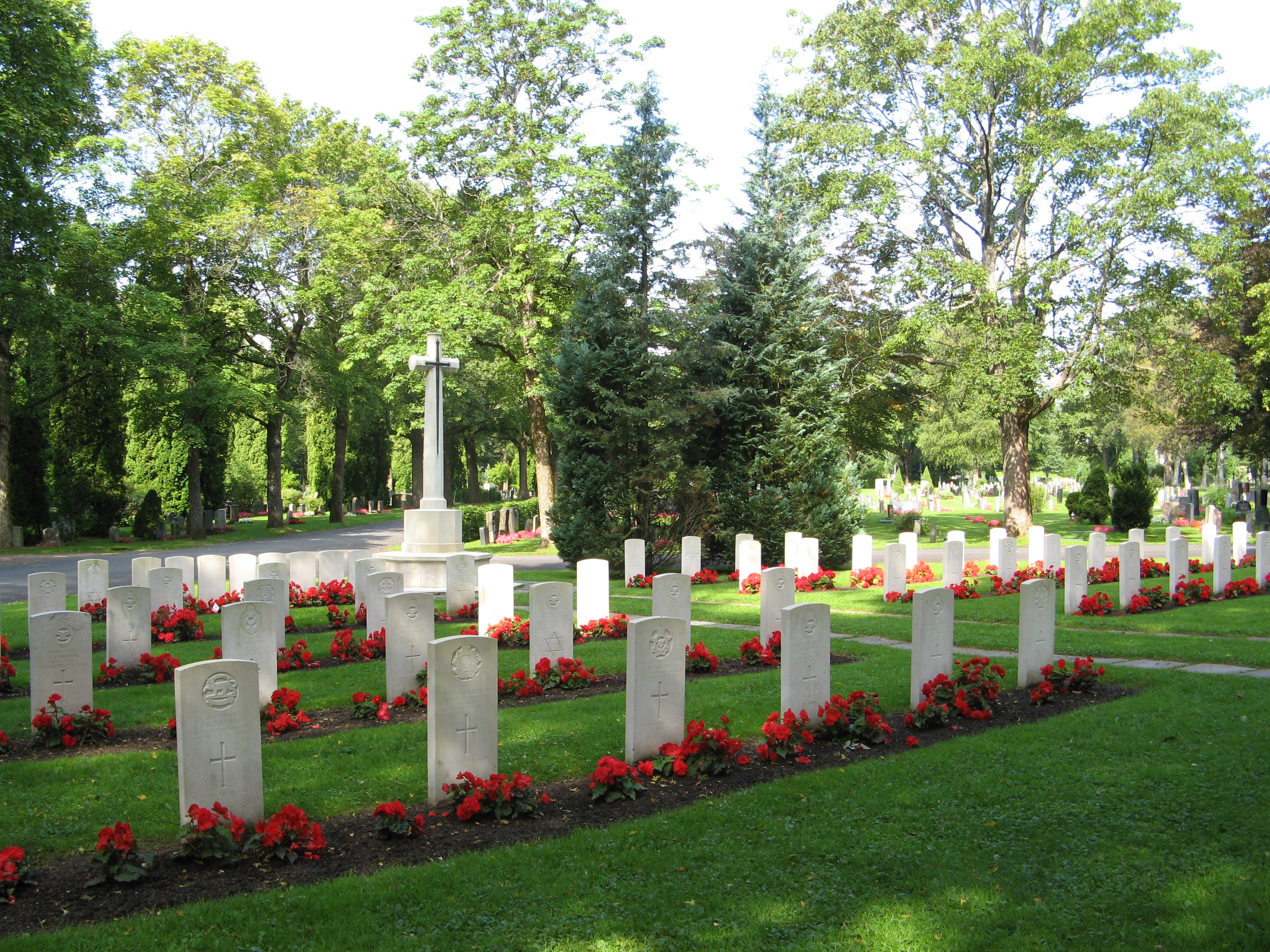

This cemetery is registered by the Commonwealth War Graves Commission as "Oslo Western Civil Cemetery". Plot 60 contains war graves of 101 British Commonwealth service personnel of World War II. Most were airmen shot down raiding the occupied Oslo Airport at Fornebu. Most of the others were killed in air crashes during Allied landings, 43 lives being lost on Liberation Day alone (10 May 1945).

The Cross of Sacrifice monument was unveiled during November 1949. The presiding officer was by General Otto Ruge, who had commanded the Norwegian Army at the time of the German invasion in April 1940. Opposite to the cross the citizens of Oslo erected a memorial to Commonwealth servicemen who died on Norwegian soil during the liberation of Norway. The memorial is in form of a kneeling figure of a mourning naked woman and was unveiled during June 1960 by King Olav V of Norway.
