= Elżbieta Szemplińska-Sobolewska =

Polish prose writer, poet and painter

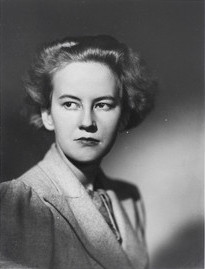
- Elżbieta Szemplińska-Sobolewska c. 1935
- Born: Elżbieta Szemplińska; 29 April 1910; Warsaw. Warsaw Governorate, Congress Poland
- Died: 27 April 1991 (aged 80); Warsaw, Poland
- Resting place: Bródno Cemetery
- Education: University of Warsaw (didn't graduate)
- Occupations: Poet; prose writer; painter
- Spouse: Zygmunt Sobolewski (m. 1932; died 1951)
- Children: 2
- Relatives: Stefan Szempliński (brother); Tadeusz Szempliński (paternal uncle); Kazimierz Szempliński (paternal cousin)
- Writing career
- Pen name: Szem; Ealt Ibże; Ryszard Bogumił
- Language: Polish
- Notable works: Narodziny człowieka (1932); Zrosty (1938–1939)

Elżbieta Szemplińska-Sobolewska (née Szemplińska, pronounced [ɛlʐˈbjeta ʂɛmˈplij̃ska sɔbɔˈlɛfska]; 1910–1991) was a Polish poet, prose writer and painter. An early member of the Communist Party of Poland, Szemplińska-Sobolewska initially supported the Soviet Occupation of Lwów (present-day, Lviv, Ukraine). Following her experiences living in the Soviet Union and the Polish People's Republic, Szemplińska-Sobolewska defected to the West.

== Early life and education ==
Elżbieta Szemplińska was born 29 April 1910, in Warsaw to Stanisława Szemplińska (née Malewska). and Zygmunt Szempliński, an economist, banker, journalist and possible university lecturer. Szemplińska-Sobolewska had one younger brother Stefan Szempliński (1913–1997), a journalist and Polish Underground State platoon commander.

Szemplińska-Sobolewska's paternal uncle was Tadeusz Szempliński, a banker and signatory of the "Declaration of the Hundred of February 22, 1916" (Polish: Deklarację Stu z 22 lutego 1916 r.). Through her uncle, Szemplińska-Sobolewska was the paternal cousin of Kazimierz Szempliński, an Olympic Fencer and resistance fighter.

Growing up in Warsaw, Szemplińska-Sobolewska was educated at Gimnazjum im. M. Konopnickiej where she was a high school classmate of Janina Dłuska, the future wife of Czesław Miłosz. In 1928, Szemplińska-Sobolewska enrolled at the University of Warsaw. However, due to ill health and financial difficulties Szemplińska-Sobolewska didn't complete her studies.

== Career ==
=== Early career ===
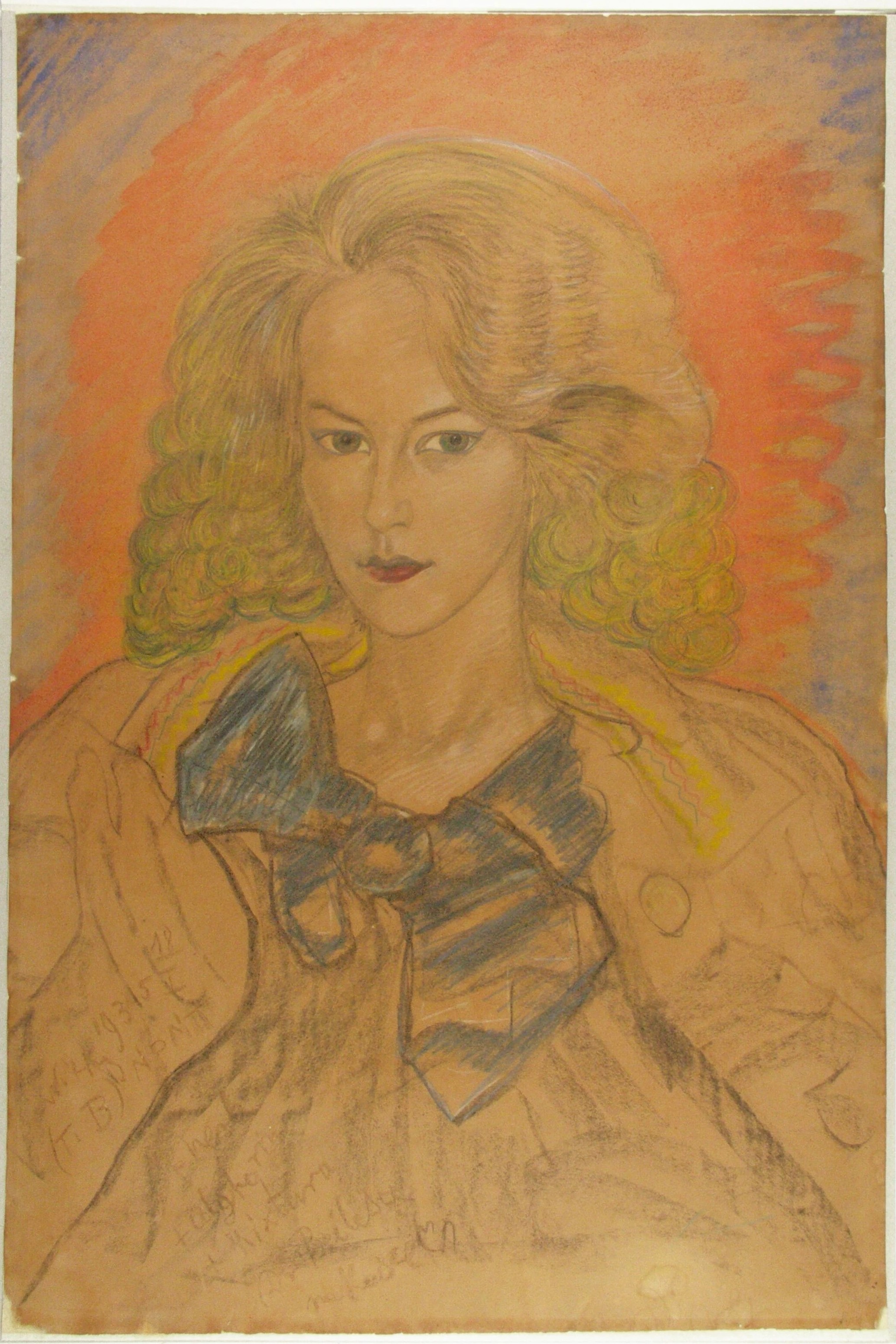
Stanisław Ignacy Witkiewicz (1935) "Portrait of Elżbieta Szemplińska-Sobolewska"

In 1926, Szemplińska-Sobolewska's first prose "Ojciec" (English: Father) was published in Robotnik under the pen name "Ealt Ibże".

In 1932, Szemplińska-Sobolewska published her first novel "The Birth of Man: A Novel. Part 1, Joyful Affirmation" (Polish: Narodziny człowieka: powieść. [Cz. 1], Radosna afirmacja), which received praise from Maria Czapska and Irena Krzywicka. Around 1932, Szemplińska-Sobolewska married Zygmunt Sobolewski, a sports journalist. The following year Szemplińska-Sobolewska published "Wiersze" (English: Poems), her only volume of interwar period poetry Szemplińska-Sobolewska was the favourite poet of actress Maria Wiercińska.

An early member of the interwar Communist Party of Poland, Szemplińska-Sobolewska was known within Warsaw's literary circles as a supporter of the radical left and Marxism. Part of the interwar generation of Polish poets known as the Pokolenie 1910 (English: The 1910 Generation), Szemplińska-Sobolewska's work was reflective of the larger shifts within Polish culture and life.

In 1935, Szemplińska-Sobolewska joined the Trade Union of Polish Writers (Polish: Związek Zawodowy Literatów Polskich).

=== Lviv ===
In 1938, Szemplińska-Sobolewska was part of the Lviv Anti-Fascist Congress of Cultural Workers.

In September 1939, following the Invasion of Poland, Szemplińska-Sobolewska fled with her husband to Lwów, Second Polish Republic (present-day Lviv, Ukraine). Szemplińska-Sobolewska was one of the fourteen signatories of the declaration of "Polish writers welcome the unification of Ukraine" (Polish: Pisarze polscy witaja zjednoczenie Ukrainy). From 1940–1941, Szemplińska-Sobolewska was one of two Polish writers on the editorial board of Literatura i mystetstvo (Ukrainian: Література і мистецтво), the journal of the Lviv Organisation of the Union of Soviet Writers of Ukraine. However, Szemplińska-Sobolewska had little influence over the content of the magazine due to her lack of fluency in Ukrainian.

In Spring 1941, Szemplińska-Sobolewska became the editor-in-chief of Almanach Literacki (English: Literary Quarterly), the Polish language quarterly of the Lviv Organisation. Sometime between 1939 and 1940 Szemplińska-Sobolewska gave birth to the couple's first son.

=== Soviet Union ===
Following the outbreak of the German–Soviet War in June 1941, Szemplińska-Sobolewska fled to Kharkov, UkrSSR (present-day, Ukraine) with Zygmunt Sobolewski and their son. In 1942, Szemplińska-Sobolewska's son died aged around 2 years. Szemplińska-Sobolewska and Sobolewski subsequently lived in the UzSSR (present-day, Uzbekistan) in the cities of Tashkent and Samarkand. Later the couple lived in Kuybyshev (present-day, Samara, Russia), Kivertsi (present-day, Ukraine). In 1944, the couple moved to Moscow where Szemplińska-Sobolewska gave birth to their second son.

According to Czesław Miłosz, Szemplińska-Sobolewska's experience of life under Soviet Communism made her determined to defect to the West.

== Post-war ==
From 1946 to 1948, Sobolewski served as the consul of the Republic of Poland in Luxembourg. During this time Szemplińska-Sobolewska published several poems in London under the pseudonym "Ryszard Bogumił", which were critical of the establishment of communist-rule in Poland.

=== Exile ===
In 1948, the family fled first to France and then onto Rome. The couple were given new passports and identities by Kazimierz Papée, the Ambassador of the Polish Government in Exile to the Vatican. The couple then moved to Morocco and settled in Casablanca.

On the 31 January 1951, Sobolewski boarded a boat to Rome which subsequently disappeared. Sobolewski's body was later found on a beach in Andalusia, and was subsequently identified during an autopsy on the 25 November 1955.

In 1958, Szemplińska-Sobolewska emigrated to Paris.

=== Return to Poland ===
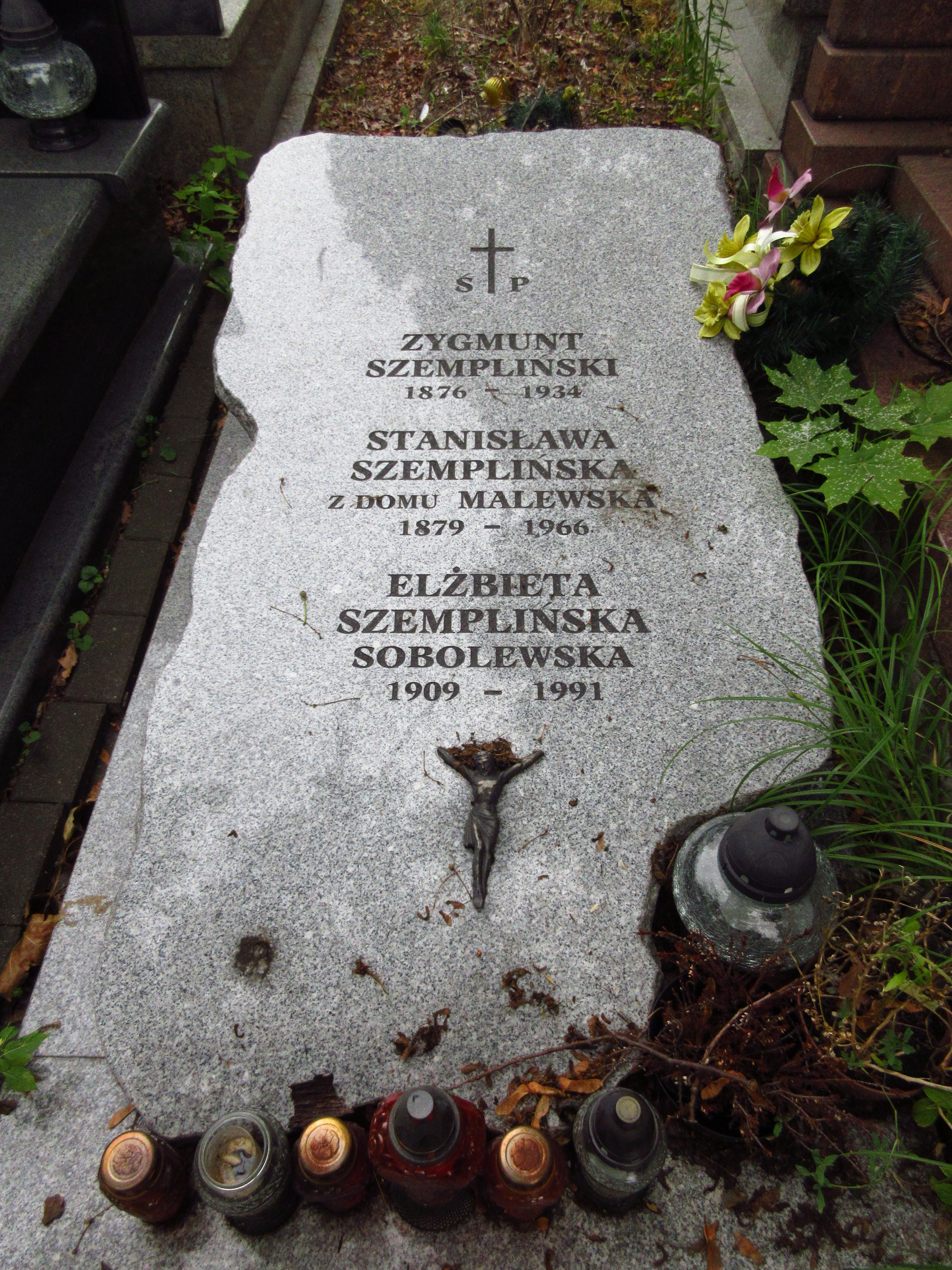
The grave of Elżbieta Szemplińska-Sobolewska at Bródno Cemetery

Szemplińska-Sobolewska returned to Warsaw in 1962.

On 27 April 1991, Szemplińska-Sobolewska died aged 80 in Warsaw, and is buried at Bródno Cemetery alongside her parents.

== Publications ==
=== Poetry ===
- Szemplińska, Elżbieta (1933). Wiersze [Poems]. Warsaw: Towarzystwo Wydawnicze.
- Szemplińska, Elżbieta (1941). Łańcuch [The Chain]. Kyiv; Lviv: Państwowe Wydawnictwo Mniejszości Narodowych.
- Szemplińska, Elżbieta (1943). Pożegnanie [Farewell]. Moscow: Wydawnictwo Literatury w Językach Obcych.
- Szemplińska, Elżbieta (1946). Krzyż Warszawy: wiersze zebrane [The Cross of Warsaw: collected poems]. Warsaw: Nowa Epoka.
- Szemplińska-Sobolewska, Elżbieta (1968). Notatki z podróży: wybór wierszy [Travel Notes: Selected Poems]. Warsaw: Czytelnik.

=== Novels ===
- Szemplińska, Elżbieta (1932). Narodziny człowieka: powieść. [Cz. 1], Radosna afirmacja [The Birth of Man: A Novel. Part 1, Joyful Affirmation]. Warsaw: Bibljoteka Groszowa.^{α}
- Szemplińska-Sobolewska, Elżbieta (1938). Potrójny ślad [The Triple Trace] (1 ed.). Warsaw: Rój.
- Szemplińska-Sobolewska, Elżbieta (1938–1939). Zrosty [Adhesion]..
- Szemplińska-Sobolewska, Elżbieta (1939). Kochankowie z Warszawy [Lovers from Warsaw]. Warsaw: Rój.
- Szemplińska, Elżbieta (1946). Warszawa w ogniu [Warsaw on Fire]. Warsaw: Nowa Epoka.
- Szemplińska-Sobolewska, Elżbieta (1968). Narodziny [Birth]. Warsaw: Czytelnik.
- Szemplińska-Sobolewska, Elżbieta (1984). Potrójny ślad: powieść [The Triple Trace: a novel]. Kraków; Wrocław: Wydawnictwo Literackie.
- Szemplińska-Sobolewska, Elżbieta (1986). Kochankowie z Warszawy; Śmierć Bazylego [Lovers from Warsaw; The Death of Bazyli]. Kraków; Wrocław: Wydawnictwo Literackie.

=== Short stories ===
- Szemplińska, Elżbieta (1935). 18 spotkań [18 meetings]. Lviv; Warsaw: Książnica Atlas.
- Szemplińska-Sobolewska, Elżbieta (1963). Powrót z daleka [Return from afar]. Warsaw: Czytelnik.

=== Children's literature ===
- Sobolewska, Elżbieta (1965). Kolczasty gość [The Prickly Guest]. Warsaw: Nasza Księgarnia.

=== Lyrics ===
- Piotr Perkowski (music) Elżbieta Szemplińska (lyrics). Niebo w ogniu: na głos z fortepianem [Sky on fire: for voice and piano] (in Polish and English), Warsaw: Wydawnictwo Muzyczne Agencji Autorskiej, 1976
- Mieczysław Weinberg (music) Elżbieta Szemplińska (lyrics). Pamiątka op. 132: Rezitativ nach Worten von Elżbieta Szemplińska: für Bass und Klavier [Souvenir op. 132: Recitation to the Words of Elżbieta Szemplińska: for Bass and Clavier] (in Polish), New York; Hamburg: Peermusic Classical, 1981

== Awards and nominations ==
Award	Year	Nominated work	Result	Ref(s)
Polish Academy of Literature Youth Award (Polish: Nagrody Młodych Polskiej Akademii Literatury)	1935	The Birth of Man: A Novel. Part 1, Joyful Affirmation (Polish: Narodziny człowieka: powieść. [Cz. 1], Radosna afirmacja)	Nominated	

== Notes ==
^α Parts 2 and 3 were lost during World War II.
