= Jan Loth =

Polish footballer (1900–1933)

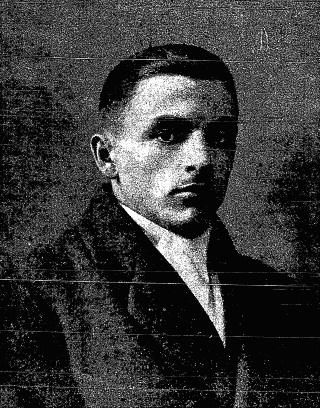

Personal information
- Date of birth: 31 August 1900
- Place of birth: Warsaw, Russian Empire
- Date of death: 7 June 1933 (aged 32)
- Place of death: Otwock, Poland
- Height: 1.76 m (5 ft 9 in)
- Positions: Goalkeeper; forward

Senior career*
Years	Team	Apps	(Gls)
1918–1919	Korona Warsaw		
1919–1920	Polonia Warsaw		
1920–1921	Pogoń Katowice		
1921–1927	Polonia Warsaw		

International career
1921–1924	Poland	5	(0)
- * Club domestic league appearances and goals

Jan Loth (31 August 1900 – 7 June 1933) was a Polish footballer.

He played in five matches for the Poland national football team between 1921 and 1924.
