= Eiliv Odde Hauge =

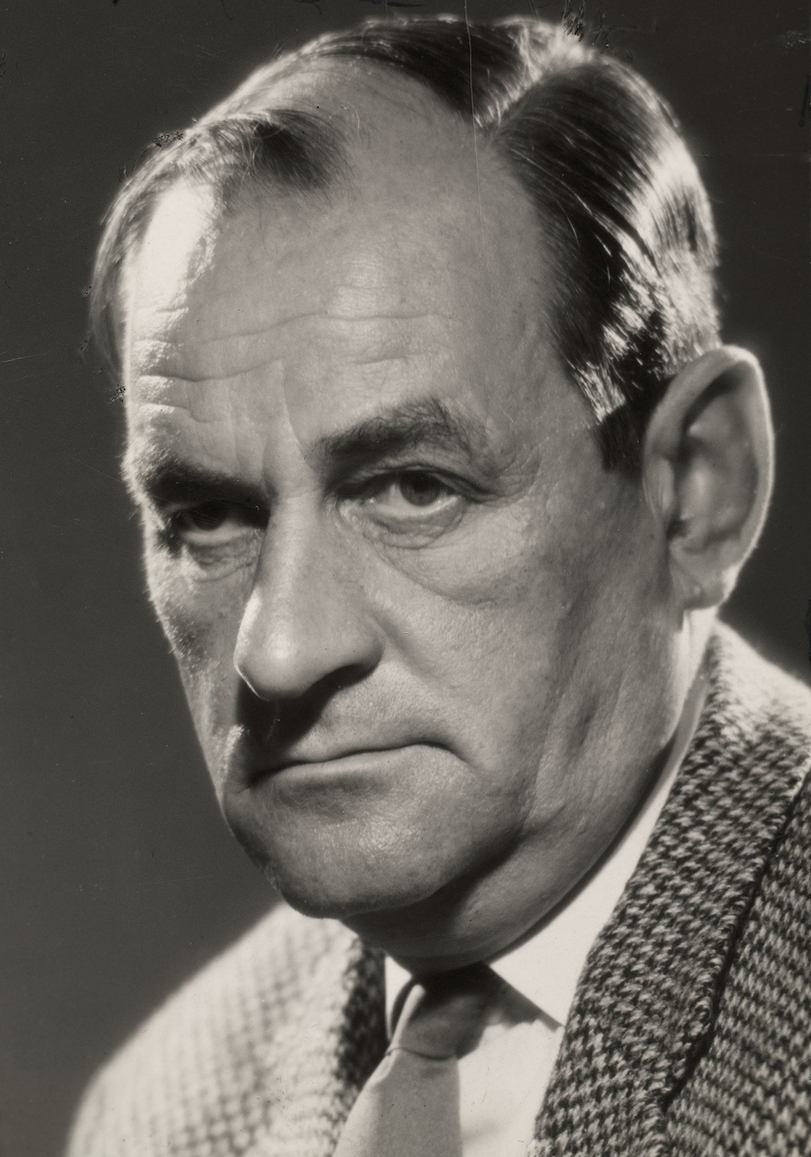
Eiliv Odde Hauge

Eiliv Odde Hauge (10 November 1913 – 3 July 1971) was a Norwegian military officer, screenwriter, author and museum director. During World War II, he was a member of the Norwegian resistance movement.

== Biography ==
Hauge was born in Stranda Municipality in Møre og Romsdal, Norway.

An early member of the National Socialist Workers' Party of Norway (NNSAP) and later Nasjonal Samling (NS) during his youth in the 1930s, Hauge had turned to join the Norwegian resistance movement by the time of the German invasion of Norway. On 30 May 1940 he helped organise and took part in the expedition from Ålesund of the motorboat Nyo that reached Baltasound, Shetland.

As a lieutenant in the exiled Norwegian Army, he headed the Norwegian Government Film Unit during the war, and after the war the Supreme Headquarters' Psychological Warfare Division, which distributed wartime films.

Hauge wrote several books about the Norwegian war effort, most notably Flukten fra Dakar (J. W. Eides Forlag; 1951). He also wrote the script for the film developed from the book and which was directed by Titus Vibe-Müller (1912–1986).

Hauge was director of the Valdres Folkemuseum from 1959 to 1964.

He died in 1971 and was buried in Øystre Slidre Municipality in Oppland county.
