= Egil Holst Torkildsen =

Norwegian national socialist editor and activist

Egil Kristian Holst Torkildsen (21 July 1916 – 17 July 1979) was a Norwegian national socialist editor and activist.

A strong proponent of pan-German national socialism, he was a member of the National Socialist Workers' Party of Norway (NNSAP) during the 1930s, until reluctantly joining Nasjonal Samling (NS) in 1940, some months after the NNSAP was dissolved. He was editor of Norsk Folkeblad in 1939–40, and a staff member of Hirden until he was hired as editor of Germaneren, the paper of Germanske SS Norge (GSSN) in 1942. Along with the leader of GSSN, Leif Schøren, Torkildsen was set aside by NS in January 1945 and sent to Germany after attempts of a pro-German coup against Vidkun Quisling and NS. He was enrolled in the Waffen-SS during the final stage of the war. Arriving in Berlin on 2 April, he fled on 16 April, and reached Denmark fourteen days later.

Torkildsen was sentenced to five years imprisonment for treason after the war. As a wanted traitor, Torkildsen fled from Norway in 1947 along with four other Norwegian Nazis on the sailboat Mi Casa, and arrived in A Coruña, Spain. From Spain he travelled to Buenos Aires, Argentina, where he became chairman of a local association of Norwegian Nazis. In 1956 Torkildsen contacted Norwegian authorities asking to return to Norway. He died in 1979 and is buried at Vestre gravlund in Oslo.
