= RKS Skra Stadium =

Football and athletics stadium in Warsaw, Poland

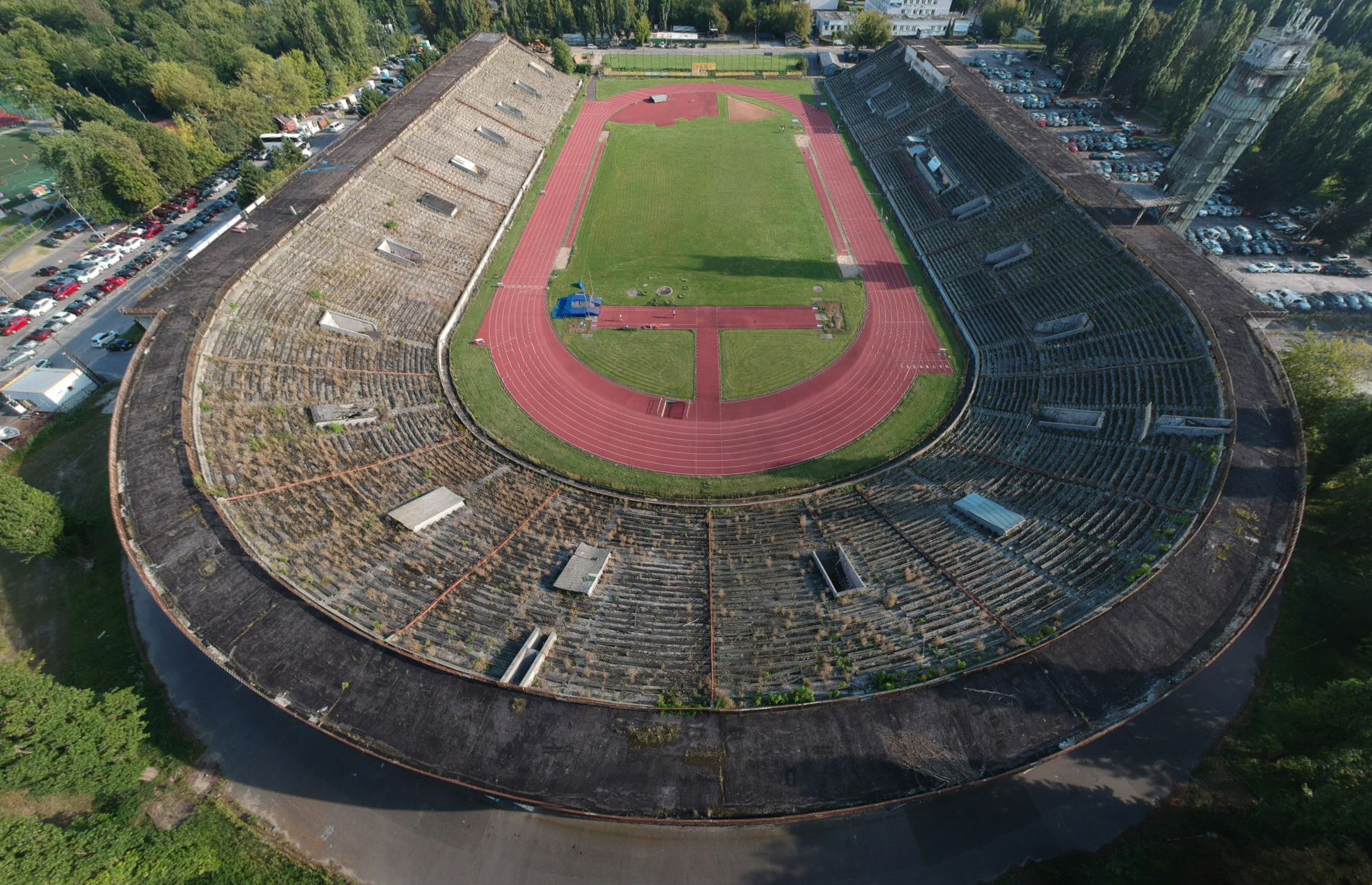
- Stadium from the north
- Interactive map of RKS Skra Stadium
- Location: Warsaw, Poland
- Coordinates: 52°12′54″N 20°59′35″E
- Capacity: 35,000
- Surface: Grass

Construction
- Groundbreaking: 1948
- Opened: 1953
- Renovated: 2024–2026 (to rebuild)
- Architects: M. Kokozow and J. Wasilewski

Tenant
- Skra Warsaw

The RKS Skra Stadium (Polish: Stadion RKS Skra) is a historic football and athletics stadium in Mokotów Field, Warsaw, Poland. It is currently used mostly for rugby union matches as the home stadium of Skra Warsaw. The stadium has a capacity of 35,000 people, but has been closed since October 2019.

== History ==
In 1930, the Warszawianka Sports Club were given a plot of land and in 1932 they built a temporary football pitch. Two years later in 1934, construction began on a football and athletics stadium with a capacity of 50,000. The construction was slow and was interrupted due to the outbreak of World War II. During the German occupation, artillery was stationed at the stadium, which left the area in ruins.

In 1946, the area was taken over by the Skra Warszawa sports club. Initially, a motorcycle speedway track was built in place of the unfinished Warszawianka athletics stadium. The first league season of speedway in Poland was held in 1948 and OM TUR Okęcie Warszawa (the speedway section of the Workers' Sports Club Okęcie Warszawa) competed during the 1948 Polish speedway season. The following year in 1949, the Okęcie speedway merged with the Skra-Związkowiec Warszawa speedway section and went on to win the silver medal in the 1949 Polish speedway season. After the 1950 season the speedway leagues were re-organised, which resulted in Skra-Związkowiec becoming Budowlani Warszawa.

The athletics stadium itself was rebuilt between 1948 and 1953, to the design of M. Kokozow and J. Wasilewski, the stadium, opened in 1953, was built in the shape of a horseshoe with a speedway track surrounded by stands with seats for 35,000 spectators. In addition there was as volleyball and basketball courts, tennis courts, and a training football pitch.

In 1957, Budowlani speedway reverted back to the name Skra Warszawa but Skra speedway was disbanded at the end of the 1959 season.

In 1966, the Museum of Physical Culture and Tourism also operated in Skra.

In 1969, the first tartan surface in Poland was laid at the stadium. It was a symbol of the highest achievements in sports construction technique and technology, enabling the organisation of large athletics events. In addition to the main stadium, which included a hotel with a canteen, a doctor's office, a sauna, a gymnasium and a wellness center, the athletes had at their disposal a training stadium located adjacent to entire facility and a swimming pool complex.

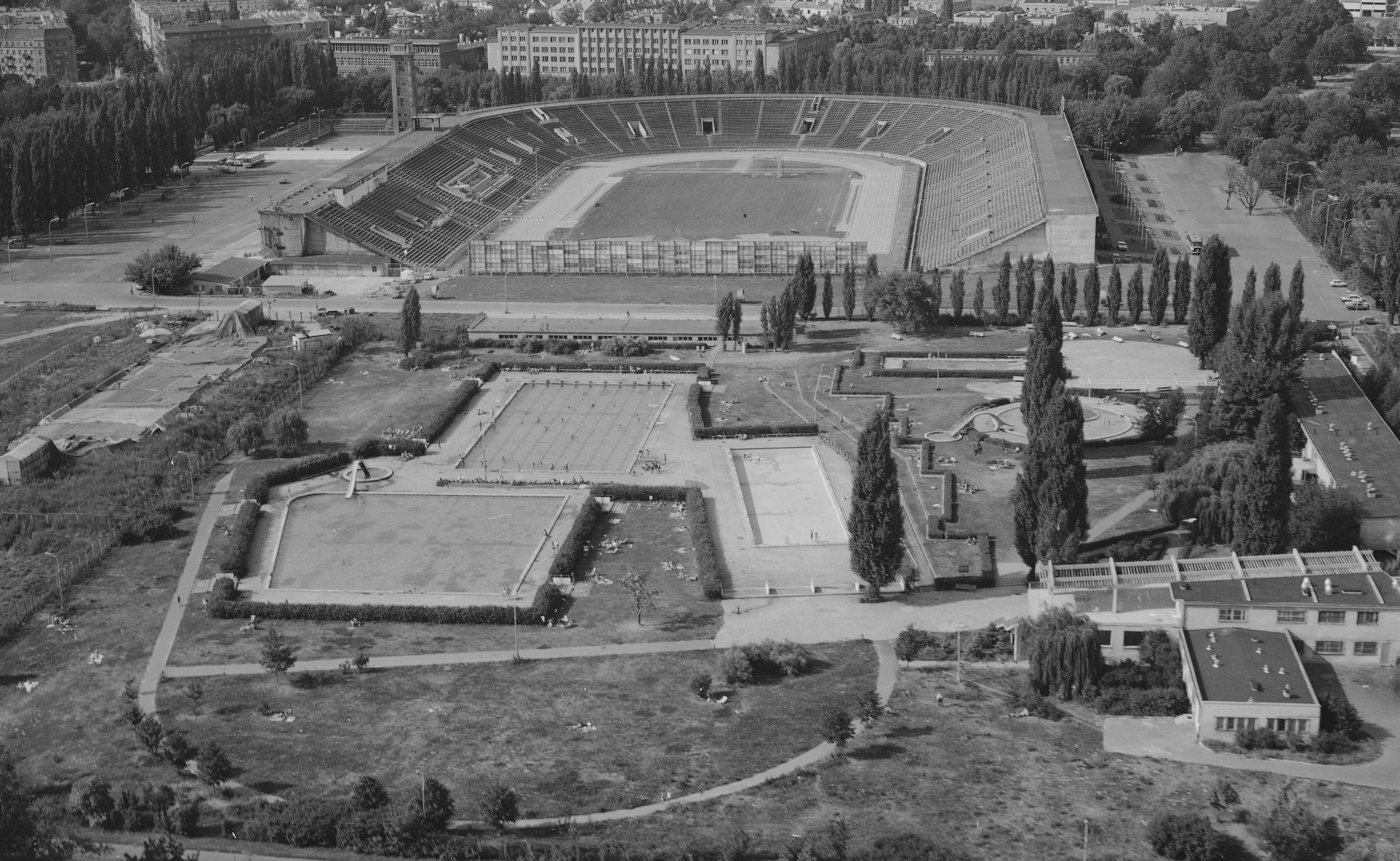
circa.1984

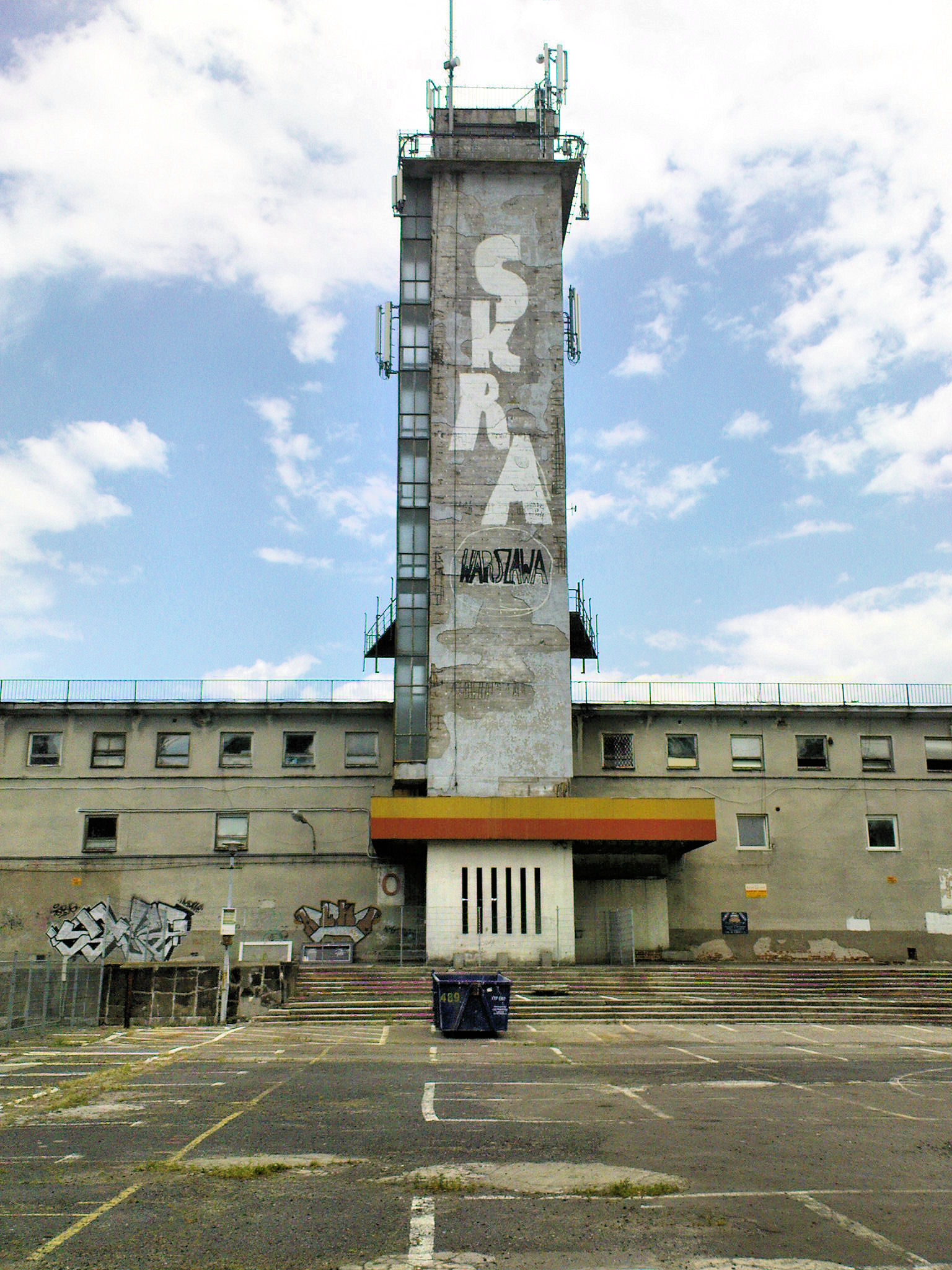
Skra stadium tower

== Closure ==
After the regime change Skra, who owned the facility, was unable to maintain it. Several attempts to invite private investors in exchange for commercial space were stopped by the city of Warsaw, arguing the site could only serve sports. As a result Skra lost the freehold of its stadium in 2015.

Falling further into disrepair, the stadium was forced to close due to safety concerns in October 2019, and the seating area began to sprout weeds. The athletics track is still in use, as are the other facilities.
