= Fronten =

Nazi newspaper in Norway (1932–1940)

Fronten (Norwegian: The Front) was a biweekly Norwegian newspaper.

== History and profile ==
It was published by Nazi Eugen Nielsen from 1932 to 1940. In the beginning, it was published biweekly, but gradually this became more sporadic. Nielsen's primary interest, which was reflected in the publications, was attacking freemasonry.

Nielsen cooperated with the short-lived National Socialist Workers' Party of Norway (Norges Nasjonalsosialistiske Arbeiderparti), and was, therefore, critical to the rivalling national socialist party Nasjonal Samling. With Nasjonal Samling seizing power in Norway in the autumn of 1940, during the German occupation of Norway, Fronten eventually ceased to exist. Nielsen continued as an Anti-Masonry consultant for the Sicherheitsdienst.
