= Eugen Nielsen =

Norwegian architect, publisher and activist

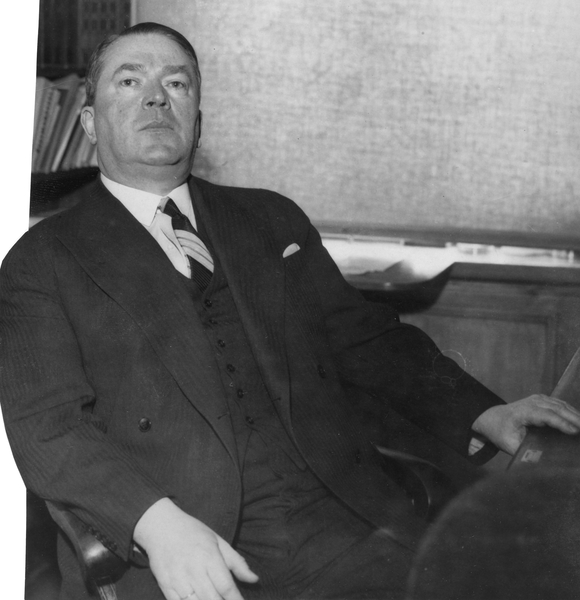
Eugen Nielsen

Georg Eugen Nielsen (1884 – 11 July 1963) was a Norwegian architect, publisher and activist.

He was an architect by profession, but was wealthy and had time to pursue an interest in writing and publishing. He published the biweekly newspaper Fronten from 1932. Fronten was an organ for the short-lived National Socialist Workers' Party of Norway, and Nielsen was skeptical to Nasjonal Samling. His main interest was exposing what he perceived as the evils of Freemasonry.

During the occupation of Norway by Nazi Germany, Nasjonal Samling people assumed political office. Nielsen never joined the party, but backed up part of it, specifically pan-Germanist fractions. He was set to administer the ownings of the Norwegian Order of Freemasons after it was closed down, and worked as an Anti-Freemasonry consultant for the Sicherheitsdienst. He attempted to stigmatize people in the Nasjonal Samling leadership with Freemasonry allegations.

During the legal purge in Norway after World War II he managed to get his case delayed until 1950, after first having been arrested between 13 May 1945 and 1946. He died in 1963, and left behind a sizeable collection of weapons. Parts of the collection was sold in 1993 at Christie's. Money was channeled to a foundation Arkitekt Eugen Nielsens Stiftelse, which among others supported Arnfinn Moland with 50,000 kr to write the strongly Nazi-critical book Over grensen? Hjemmefrontens likvidasjoner under okkupasjonen av Norge 1940–1945.
