= Franciszek Kawa =

Polish cross-country skier

Personal information
- Nationality: Polish
- Born: 3 October 1901 Lemberg, Austria-Hungary
- Died: 10 February 1985 (aged 83) Oslo, Norway

Sport
- Sport: Cross-country skiing

Franciszek Kawa (3 October 1901 – 10 February 1985) was a Polish cross-country skier. He competed in the men's 50 kilometre event at the 1928 Winter Olympics.

Kawa fought in Poland's defense during the German invasion of Poland at the start of World War II in September 1939. Afterwards, he was held by the Germans in the Oflag IX-B, Oflag IX-A, Oflag II-D and Oflag II-C prisoner-of-war camps.
