= Andrzej Nowicki (writer) =

Polish poet (1909–1986)

Andrzej Nowicki (1909–1986) was a Polish poet, satirical writer, and translator. He fought in the Polish September Campaign of 1939. He was imprisoned in the German officers' camp Oflag II-C in Woldenberg, and organized cultural activities there. From 1945 to 1948 he worked for the Polish Press Agency in London. He returned to Poland in 1956.

Nowicki co-wrote Księga nonsensu (Book of Nonsense) with Antoniego Marianowicza, translating from English into Polish poems and short stories by (to name just a few) Edward Lear, Lewis Carroll, W. S. Gilbert and T. S. Eliot.
