= Stanisław Sośnicki =

Polish sprinter

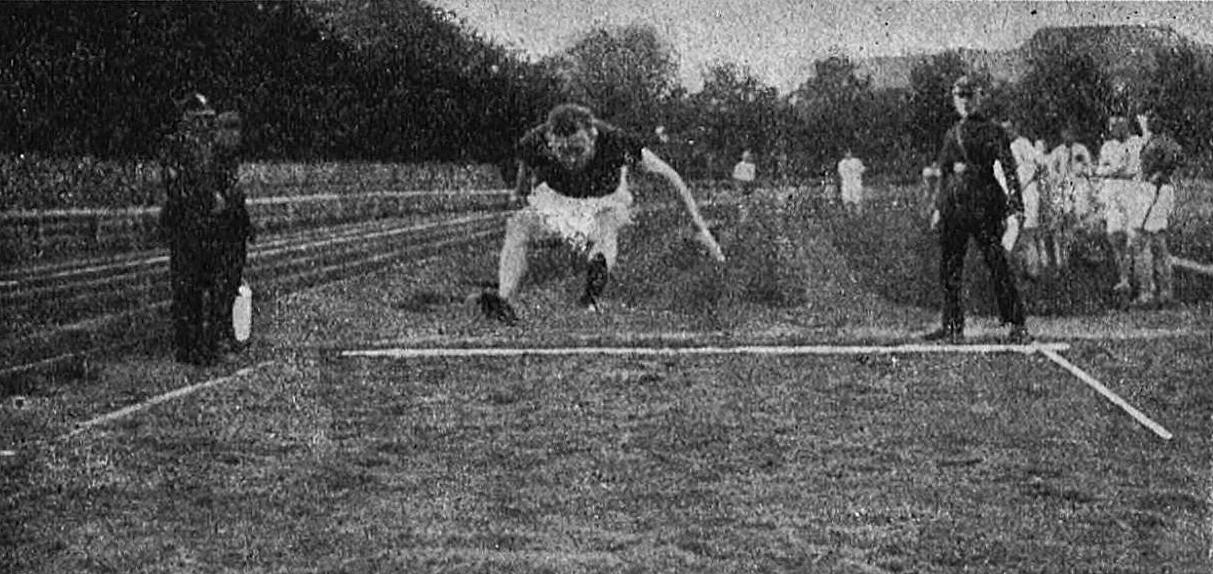
- Stanisław Sośnicki in 1923

Personal information
- Nationality: Polish
- Born: 12 September 1896 Warsaw, Russian Empire
- Died: 2 July 1962 (aged 65) Warsaw, Poland

Sport
- Sport: Track and field
- Events: 100m, long jump

Stanisław Adam Sośnicki (12 September 1896 – 2 July 1962) was a Polish military officer, diplomat, sprinter and long jumper. He competed in the men's 100 metres and the long jump events at the 1924 Summer Olympics.

His clubs were Czarni Lwów, Korona Warsaw, Polonia Warsaw and AZS Warsaw.

Sośnicki fought in the battles of Bydgoszcz, Bzura and Warsaw against the German invasion of Poland at the start of World War II. Afterwards, he was held by the Germans in the Oflag X-C and Oflag II-C prisoner-of-war camps.
