= Olga Chojecka =

Polish race walker (born 1997)

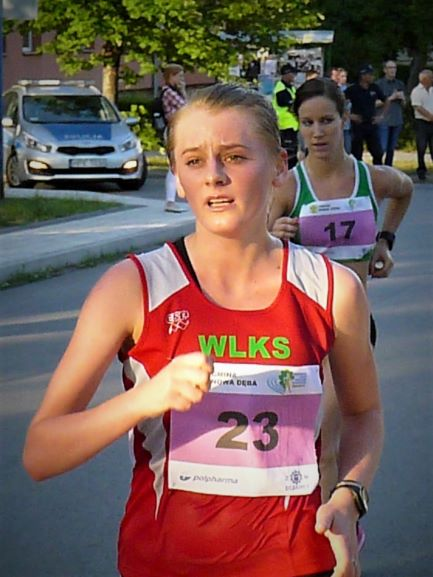
- Olga Niedziałek (2017)

Personal information
- Born: 30 June 1997 (age 28)

Sport
- Country: Poland
- Sport: Track and field
- Event: Racewalking
- Club: WLKS Nowe Iganie

Olga Chojecka (née Niedziałek; born 30 June 1997) is a Polish racewalker. She has won multiple medals at the Polish Championships and competed internationally.

== Career ==
=== Early career ===
Chojecka began her career in racewalking at a young age and quickly progressed through the ranks in national competitions.

=== National Competitions ===
Chojecka has secured various medals in the Polish Championships, including:

- Silver medalist in the 5000 m walk at the 2020 Polish Athletics Championships in Włocławek and the 2022 Polish Athletics Championships in Suwałki.
- Gold medalist in the 5000 m walk at the 2023 Polish Athletics Championships in Gorzów Wielkopolski.
- Silver medalist in the 20 km walk at the 2022 Polish Athletics Championships in Sulejówek.
- Bronze medalist in the 20 km walk at the 2018 Polish Athletics Championships in Warsaw, the 2019 Polish Athletics Championships in Mielec, and the 2020 Polish Athletics Championships in Warsaw.
- Silver medalist in the 35 km walk at the 2023 Polish Athletics Championships in Dudince.

=== International Competitions ===
Chojecka won a silver medal in the 20 km race walk at the 2019 European Athletics U23 Championships in Gävle.

She also competed at the 2023 World Athletics Championships in Budapest, where she finished eighth in the 35 km race walk.

== Personal life ==
Olga Chojecka is married and previously competed under her maiden name, Niedziałek. Her brother, Łukasz Niedziałek, is also a racewalker.
