= 2020 Polish Indoor Athletics Championships =

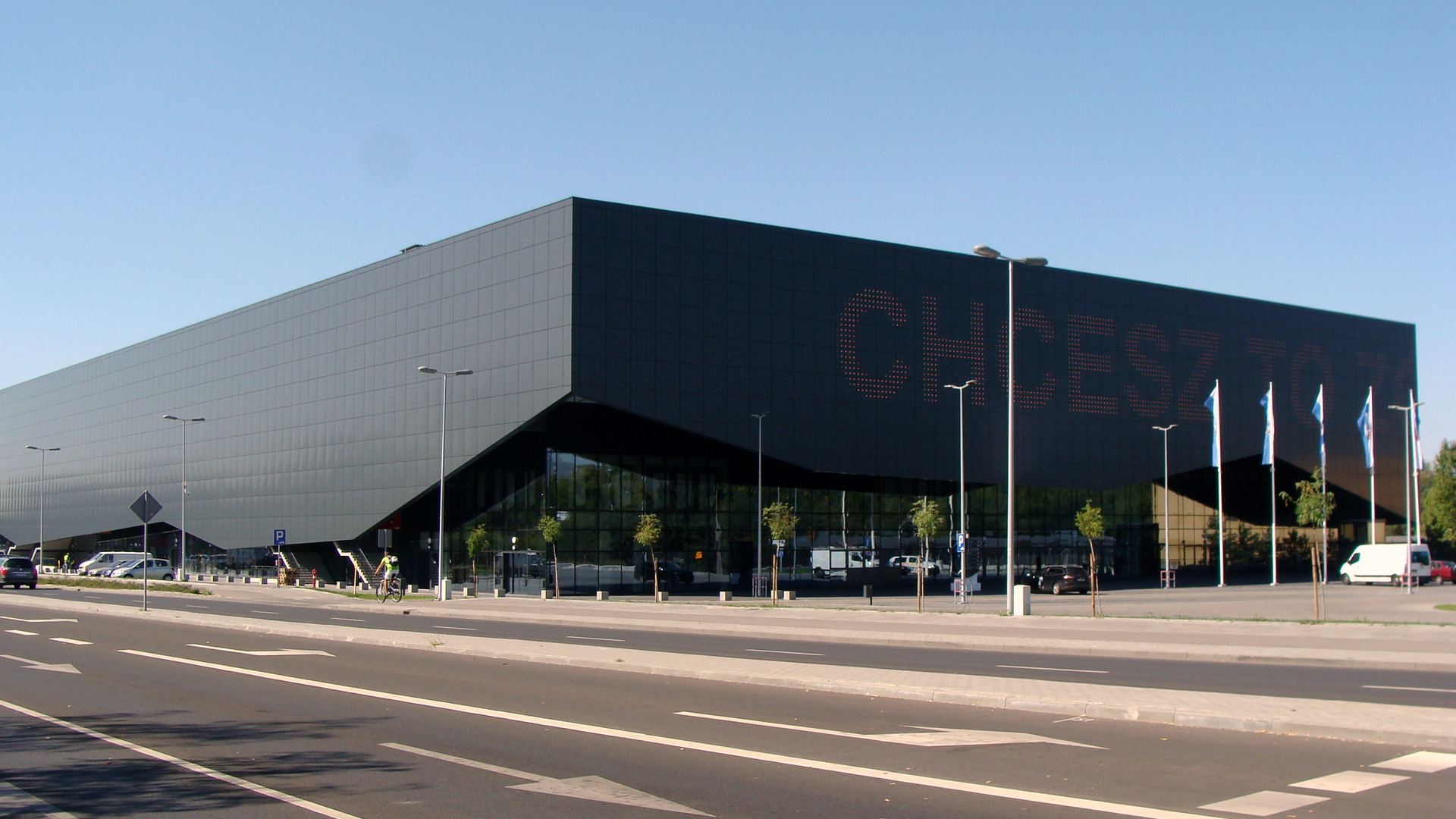
- The host stadium
- Dates: 29 February – 1 March
- Host city: Toruń
- Venue: Arena Toruń
- Events: 31

The 2020 Polish Indoor Athletics Championships (Polish: Halowe Mistrzostwa Polski Seniorów w Lekkoatletyce 2020) was the 64th edition of the national championship in indoor track and field for Poland, organised by the Polish Athletic Association. It was held on 29 February – 1 March at Arena Toruń in Toruń. A total of 31 events (divided evenly between the sexes, with one mixed-sex event) were contested over the two-day competition. It was to serve as preparation for the 2020 World Athletics Indoor Championships, which was postponed due to the COVID-19 outbreak in China before the German championships.

== Results ==
=== Men ===
Event	Gold		Silver		Bronze	
60 metres	Remigiusz Olszewski; CWZS Zawisza Bydgoszcz	6.71	Karol Kwiatkowski; AZS-AWF Katowice	6.75	Dominik Kopeć; KS Agros Zamość	6.76
200 metres	Oliwer Wdowik; CWKS Resovia Rzeszów	21.09 NU20R	Rafał Omelko; KS AZS AWF Wrocław	21.33	Patryk Wykrota; OŚ AZS Poznań	21.68
400 metres	Kajetan Duszyński; AZS Łódź	47.95	Cezary Mirosław; AZS UMCS Lublin	48.02	Tymoteusz Zimny; WKS Śląsk Wrocław	48.11
800 metres	Mateusz Borkowski; RKS Łódź	1:51.27	Patryk Sieradzki; CWZS Zawisza Bydgoszcz SL	1:52.73	Patryk Tanaś; AZS-AWFiS Gdańsk	1:53.11
1500 metres	Adam Czerwiński; UKS Lider Siercza	3:48.98	Artur Ostrowski; KB Sporting Międzyzdroje	3:51.32	Andrzej Kowalczyk; ULKS Fajfer 2001 Łapanów	3:51.74
3000 metres	Adam Czerwiński; UKS Lider Siercza	8:17.76	Bartosz Jarczuk; AZS-AWF Katowice	8:20.71	Szymon Topolnicki; AZS-AWF Katowice	8:21.36
60 m hurdles	Damian Czykier; KS Podlasie Białystok	7.64	Artur Noga; AZS-AWF Warszawa	7.68	Krzysztof Kiljan; AZS-AWF Warszawa	7.83 PB
4 × 200 m relay	OŚ AZS Poznań; Patryk Wykrota; Eryk Hampel; Adrian Wesela; Adam Balcerek	1:27.53	KS Sprinterzy.com Kraków; Łukasz Malanowski; Jakub Szkopański; Jan Socha; Norbert Waśkiewicz	1:34.34	Only two finishing teams	
5000 m walk	Dawid Tomala; AZS KU Politechniki Opolskiej	19:42.96	Rafał Augustyn; LKS Stal Mielec	19:50.18	Łukasz Niedziałek; WLKS Nowe Iganie	19:54.35 PB
High jump	Norbert Kobielski; MKS Inowrocław	2.29 m PB	Sylwester Bednarek; RKS Łódź	2.26 m	Bartłomiej Bedeniczuk; KS AZS-AWF Biała Podlaska	2.09 m
Pole vault	Paweł Wojciechowski; CWZS Zawisza Bydgoszcz SL	5.70 m	Robert Sobera; KS AZS AWF Wrocław	5.60 m	Mateusz Jerzy; CWZS Zawisza Bydgoszcz SL	5.40 m
Long jump	Mateusz Różański; KU AZS PWSZ w Tarnowie	7.80 m PB	Piotr Tarkowski; KS AZS-AWF Biała Podlaska	7.77 m PB	Patryk Tański; AZS-AWFiS Gdańsk	7.70 m PB
Triple jump	Karol Hoffmann; AZS UMCS Lublin	16.18 m	Krzysztof Uwijała; MKS Sambor Tczew	15.41 m	Jakub Daroszewski; BKS Bydgoszcz	15.28 m PB
Shot put	Michał Haratyk; KS Sprint Bielsko-Biała	21.24 m	Konrad Bukowiecki; KS AZS UWM Olsztyn	21.16 m	Jakub Szyszkowski; AZS-AWF Katowice	20.07 m
Heptathlon	Paweł Wiesiołek; KS Warszawianka Warszawa	6050 pts PB	Rafał Horbowicz; KS Warszawianka Warszawa	5679 pts NU23R=	Jacek Chochorowski; AZS KU Politechniki Opolskiej Opole	5391 pts PB

=== Women ===
Event	Gold		Silver		Bronze	
60 metres	Marika Popowicz-Drapała; CWZS Zawisza Bydgoszcz	7.29	Katarzyna Sokólska; CWZS Zawisza Bydgoszcz	7.30 PB	Kamila Ciba; OŚ AZS Poznań	7.40
200 metres	Justyna Święty-Ersetic; AZS-AWF Katowice Marlena Gola; KS Podlasie Białystok	23.64 PB	Not awarded		Natalia Wosztyl; RLTL ZTE Radom	24.10
400 metres	Justyna Święty-Ersetic; AZS-AWF Katowice	53.09	Małgorzata Hołub-Kowalik; AZS UMCS Lublin	53.53	Natalia Kaczmarek; KS AZS AWF Wrocław	53.65
800 metres	Anna Pólkowska; AZS-AWFiS Gdańsk	2:05.75	Emilia Ankiewicz; AZS-AWF Warszawa	2:06.78 PB	Natalia Gulczyńska; MKL Szczecin	2:06.92
1500 metres	Beata Topka; ULKS Talex Borzytuchom	4:24.14	Katarzyna Chryczyk; KS AZS AWF Kraków	4:25.05	Aleksandra Płocińska; SRS Kondycja Piaseczno	4:35.76 PB
3000 metres	Renata Pliś; MKL Maraton Świnoujście	9:14.42	Anna Bańkowska; KS Podlasie Białystok	9:32.18	Beata Topka; ULKS Talex Borzytuchom	9:40.34
60 m hurdles	Klaudia Siciarz; KS AZS AWF Kraków	8.02	Karolina Kołeczek; AZS UMCS Lublin	8.08	Klaudia Wojtunik; AZS Łódź	8.31
4 × 200 m relay	AZS-AWF Katowice; Justyna Święty-Ersetic; Magdalena Stefanowicz; Paulina Guzowska; Adrianna Janowicz	1:36.08	AZS-AWF Warszawa; Paulina Paluch; Urszula Bhebhe; Justyna Paluch; Natalia Duchnowska	1:37.96	KS AZS AWF Wrocław; Natalia Kaczmarek; Agata Forkasiewicz; Jagoda Mierzyńska; Alicja Rajewska	1:38.14
3000 m walk	Agnieszka Ellward; WKS Flota Gdynia	12:52.61 PB	Katarzyna Zdziebło; LKS Stal Mielec	12:56.51	Paulina Buziak-Śmiatacz; LKS Stal Mielec	13:15.76
High jump	Wiktoria Miąso; CWKS Resovia Rzeszów Paulina Borys; SKLA Sopot	1.75 m	Not awarded		Paulina Wal; AZS KU Politechniki Opolskiej Opole	1.70 m
Pole vault	Agnieszka Kaszuba; KL Gdynia	4.30 m PB	Kamila Przybyła; CWZS Zawisza Bydgoszcz	4.20 m	Naama Bernstein; AZS KU Politechniki Opolskiej	4.10 m
Long jump	Karolina Młodawska; KKL Kielce	6.45 m PB	Adrianna Szóstak; OŚ AZS Poznań	6.19 m PB	Joanna Kuryło; KS AZS AWF Wrocław	6.18 m
Triple jump	Adrianna Szóstak; OŚ AZS Poznań	13.46 m PB	Agnieszka Bednarek; AZS Łódź	12.51 m	Natalia Mach; AZS-AWF Katowice	12.41 m PB
Shot put	Maja Ślepowrońska; AZS-AWF Warszawa	16.64 m PB	Agnieszka Maluśkiewicz; OŚ AZS Poznań	15.54 m	Karolina Urban; AZS-AWFiS Gdańs	15.18 m
Pentathlon	Paulina Ligarska; SKLA Sopot	4353 pts PB	Patrycja Skórzewska; KS AZS AWF Kraków	4061 pts	Izabela Mikołajczyk; KS Warszawianka	4042 pts

=== Mixed ===
Event	Gold		Silver		Bronze	
4 × 400 metres relay	OŚ AZS Poznań; Joanna Bekus; Mikołaj Buzała; Martyna Galant; Amadeusz Zdrojewski	3:29.84	AZS UMCS Lublin; Cezary Mirosław; Małgorzata Kołdej; Małgorzata Hołub-Kowalik; Szymon Żywko	3:31.95	KS AZS AWF Kraków; Mariusz Jurczyk; Mariola Karaś; Karolina Cuber; Szymon Zięba	3:34.29
