= 2019 Polish Indoor Athletics Championships =

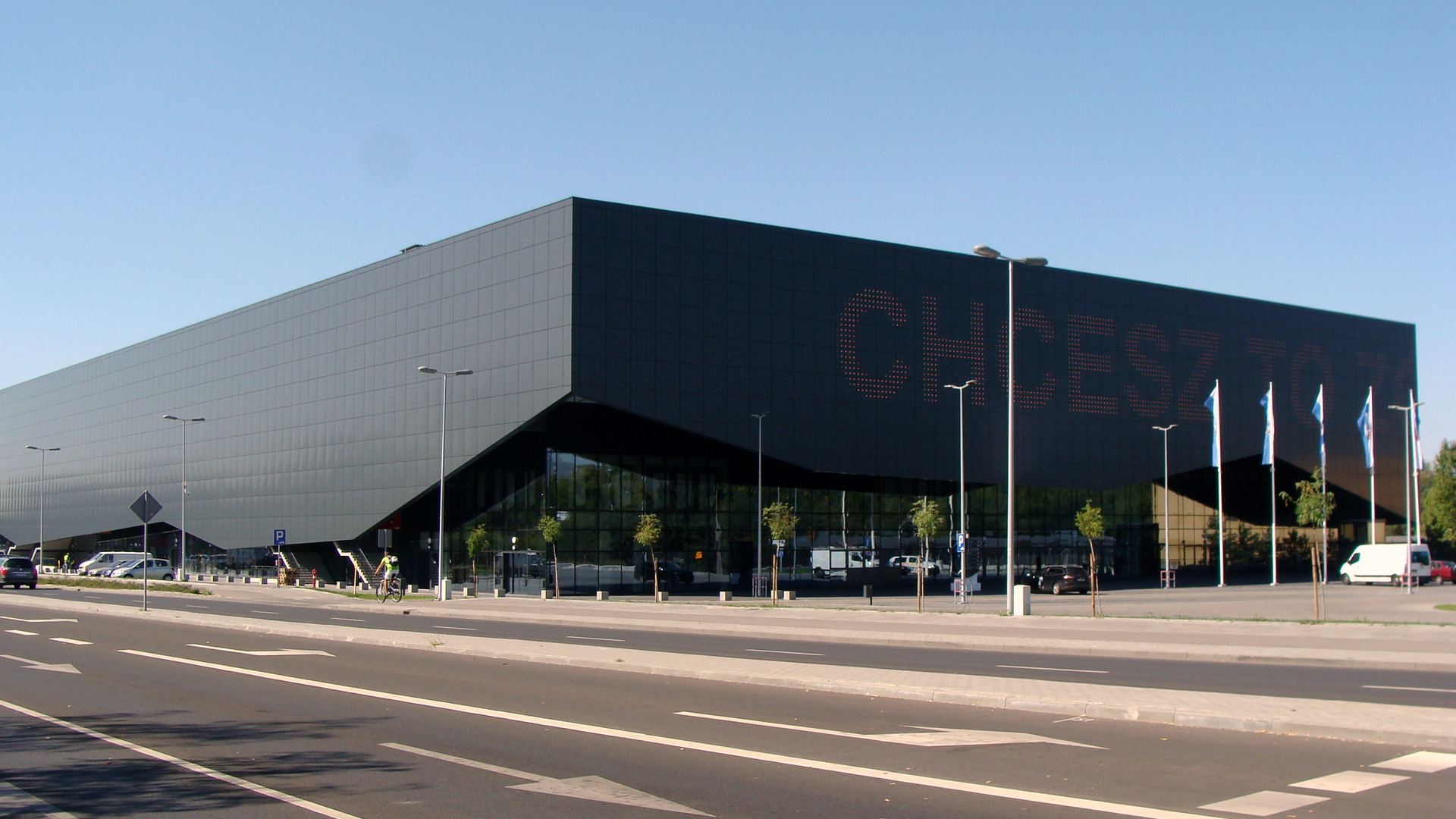
- The host stadium
- Dates: 16–17 February
- Host city: Toruń
- Venue: Arena Toruń
- Events: 31

The 2019 Polish Indoor Athletics Championships (Polish: Halowe Mistrzostwa Polski Seniorów w Lekkoatletyce 2019) was the 63rd edition of the national championship in indoor track and field for Poland. It was held on 16–17 February at Arena Toruń in Toruń. A total of 31 events (divided evenly between the sexes, with one mixed-sex event) were contested over the two-day competition. It served as the selection meeting for Poland at the 2019 European Athletics Indoor Championships.

== Results ==
=== Men ===
Event	Gold		Silver		Bronze	
60 metres	Remigiusz Olszewski; CWZS Zawisza Bydgoszcz	6.67	Dominik Kopeć; KS Agros Zamość	6.75	Piotr Tarkowski; KS AZS-AWF Biała Podlaska	6.84 =PB
200 metres	Dominik Smosarski; KS AZS UWM Olsztyn	21.28	Adrian Brzeziński; MKL Toruń	21.33	Dariusz Kowaluk; AZS-AWF Warszawa	21.39 =PB
400 metres	Karol Zalewski; AZS-AWF Katowice	46.85	Rafał Omelko; KS AZS AWF Wrocław	47.12	Jakub Krzewina; WKS Śląsk Wrocław	47.14
800 metres	Mateusz Borkowski; RKS Łódź	1:49.64	Jakub Augustyniak; GKS Olimpia Grudziądz	1:50.94 PB	Patryk Kozłowski; RLTL ZTE Radom	1:51.19
1500 metres	Michał Rozmys; UKS Barnim Goleniów	3:43.41	Adam Czerwiński; UKS Lider Siercza	3:44.95	Szymon Żywko; AZS UMCS Lublin	3:48.00 PB
3000 metres	Marcin Lewandowski; CWZS Zawisza Bydgoszcz	8:16.00 PB	Andrzej Kowalczyk; ULKS Fajfer 2001 Łapanów	8:20.78 PB	Paweł Pankratow; MKS Hermes Gryfino	8:22.46 PB
60 m hurdles	Damian Czykier; KS Podlasie Białystok	7.71	Dominik Bochenek; CWZS Zawisza Bydgoszcz	7.75	Dominik Staśkiewicz; AZS-AWF Warszawa	7.85
4 × 200 metres relay	AZS-AWF Katowice; Karol Zalewski; Przemysław Słowikowski; Paweł Dzida; Karol Kwiatkowski	1:26.11	OŚ AZS Poznań; Eryk Hampel; Artur Zaczek; Adam Balcerek; Adrian Wesela	1:27.56	WKS Śląsk Wrocław; Łukasz Krawczuk; Tymoteusz Zimny; Radosław Maciąg; Antoni Walicki	1:27.66
5000 m walk	Dawid Tomala; AZS KU Politechniki Opolskiej	19:26.32	Rafał Augustyn; LKS Stal Mielec	19:35.29	Artur Brzozowski; AZS-AWF Katowice	19:44.57
High jump	Norbert Kobielski; MKS Inowrocław	2.22	Sylwester Bednarek; RKS Łódź	2.19	Maciej Grynienko; UKS Orlica Domaniów	2.16
Pole vault	Piotr Lisek; OSOT Szczecin	5.83	Paweł Wojciechowski; CWZS Zawisza Bydgoszcz	5.60	Robert Sobera; KS AZS AWF Wrocław	5.50
Long jump	Tomasz Jaszczuk; AZS-AWF Katowice	7.93	Mateusz Różański; KU AZS PWSZ w Tarnowie	7.77	Piotr Tarkowski; KS AZS-AWF Biała Podlaska	7.73 PB
Triple jump	Adrian Świderski; WKS Śląsk Wrocław	16.45	Jan Kulmaczewski; UKS Kapry-armexim Pruszków	15.49	Rafał Sulwirski; AZS-AWF Warszawa	15.36 PB
Shot put	Michał Haratyk; KS Sprint Bielsko-Biała	20.92	Konrad Bukowiecki; KS AZS UWM Olsztyn	20.78	Jakub Szyszkowski; AZS-AWF Katowice	20.23
Heptathlon	Paweł Wiesiołek; KS Warszawianka	5699 pts	Mikołaj Jakóbczak; KS AZS AWF Wrocław	5244 pts PB	Michał Krawczyk; AZS-AWF Warszawa	5123 pts

=== Women ===
Event	Gold		Silver		Bronze	
60 metres	Ewa Swoboda; AZS-AWF Katowice	7.15	Martyna Kotwiła; RLTL ZTE Radom	7.30 PB	Kamila Ciba; OŚ AZS Poznań	7.39
200 metres	Martyna Kotwiła; RLTL ZTE Radom	23.71 PB	Agata Forkasiewicz; KS AZS AWF Wrocław	24.00	Monika Stefanowicz; AZS-AWF Katowice	24.26
400 metres	Iga Baumgart-Witan; BKS Bydgoszcz	52.05	Justyna Święty-Ersetic; AZS-AWF Katowice	52.16	Anna Kiełbasińska; SKLA Sopot	52.32 PB
800 metres	Weronika Wyka; AZS-AWF Warszawa	2:05.48	Anna Sabat; CWKS Resovia Rzeszów	2:06.09	Natalia Gulczyńska; MKL Szczecin	2:06.56 PB
1500 metres	Sofia Ennaoui; AZS UMCS Lublin	4:15.62	Beata Topka; ULKS Talex Borzytuchom	4:21.80 PB	Katarzyna Broniatowska; KS AZS AWF Kraków	4:21.98
3000 metres	Renata Pliś; MKL Maraton Świnoujście	9:05.98	Anna Gosk; KS Podlasie Białystok	9:19.05 PB	Aleksandra Brzezińska; MKL Toruń	9:20.80 PB
60 m hurdles	Klaudia Siciarz; KS AZS AWF Kraków	7.95 PB	Karolina Kołeczek; AZS UMCS Lublin	8.03 PB	Urszula Bhebhe; AZS-AWF Warszawa	8.33
4 × 200 metres relay	AZS-AWF Katowice; Justyna Święty-Ersetic; Monika Stefanowicz; Natalia Węglarz; Karolina Łozowska	1:36.65	AZS-AWF Warszawa; Paulina Paluch; Urszula Bhebhe; Natalia Duchnowska; Justyna Paluch	1:37.71	KS AZS AWF Wrocław; Anna Pałys; Agata Forkasiewicz; Jagoda Mierzyńska; Joanna Linkiewicz	1:38.20
3000 m walk	Agnieszka Szwarnóg; KS AZS AWF Kraków	13:00.05	Agnieszka Ellward; WKS Flota Gdynia	13:10.68	Katarzyna Zdziebło; LKS Stal Mielec	13:19.81
High jump	Aneta Rydz; RLTL ZTE Radom	1.81	Michalina Kwaśniewska; ZLKL Zielona Góra	1.78	Aleksandra Nowakowska; RKS Łódź	1.78
Pole vault	Agnieszka Kaszuba; KL Gdynia	4.20	Anna Łyko; MKS MOS Wrocław	4.10 =SB	Milena Lipińska; OSOT Gdańsk	3.70 =PB
Long jump	Joanna Kuryło; KS AZS AWF Wrocław	6.14	Karolina Młodawska; KKL Kielce	6.13 PB	Weronika Grzelak; LKS Górnik Wałbrzych	6.11
Triple jump	Adrianna Szóstak; OŚ AZS Poznań	13.28 PB	Gaja Wota; WKS Wawel Kraków	13.28 PB	Aleksandra Kwiecień; MKS Hermes Gryfino	12.65 =PB
Shot put	Klaudia Kardasz; KS Podlasie Białystok	18.21	Agnieszka Maluśkiewicz; OŚ AZS Poznań	16.07	Anna Niedbała; MKS Hermes Gryfino	15.59
Pentathlon	Adrianna Sułek; CWZS Zawisza Bydgoszcz	4365 pts	Paulina Ligarska; SKLA Sopot	4285 pts PB	Patrycja Skórzewska; KS AZS AWF Kraków	4138 pts PB

=== Mixed ===
Event	Gold		Silver		Bronze	
4 × 400 metres relay	AZS-AWF Warszawa; Wiktor Suwara; Weronika Wyka; Agata Kołecka; Dariusz Kowaluk	3:27.37	RLTL ZTE Radom; Jakub Smoliński; Izabela Smolińska; Bartłomiej Czajkowski; Natalia Wosztyl	3:29.90	KS AZS AWF Kraków; Nikodem Wylęga; Mariola Karaś; Karolina Cuber; Jakub Mordyl	3:30.53
