= Karol Zalewski =

Polish sprinter (born 1993)

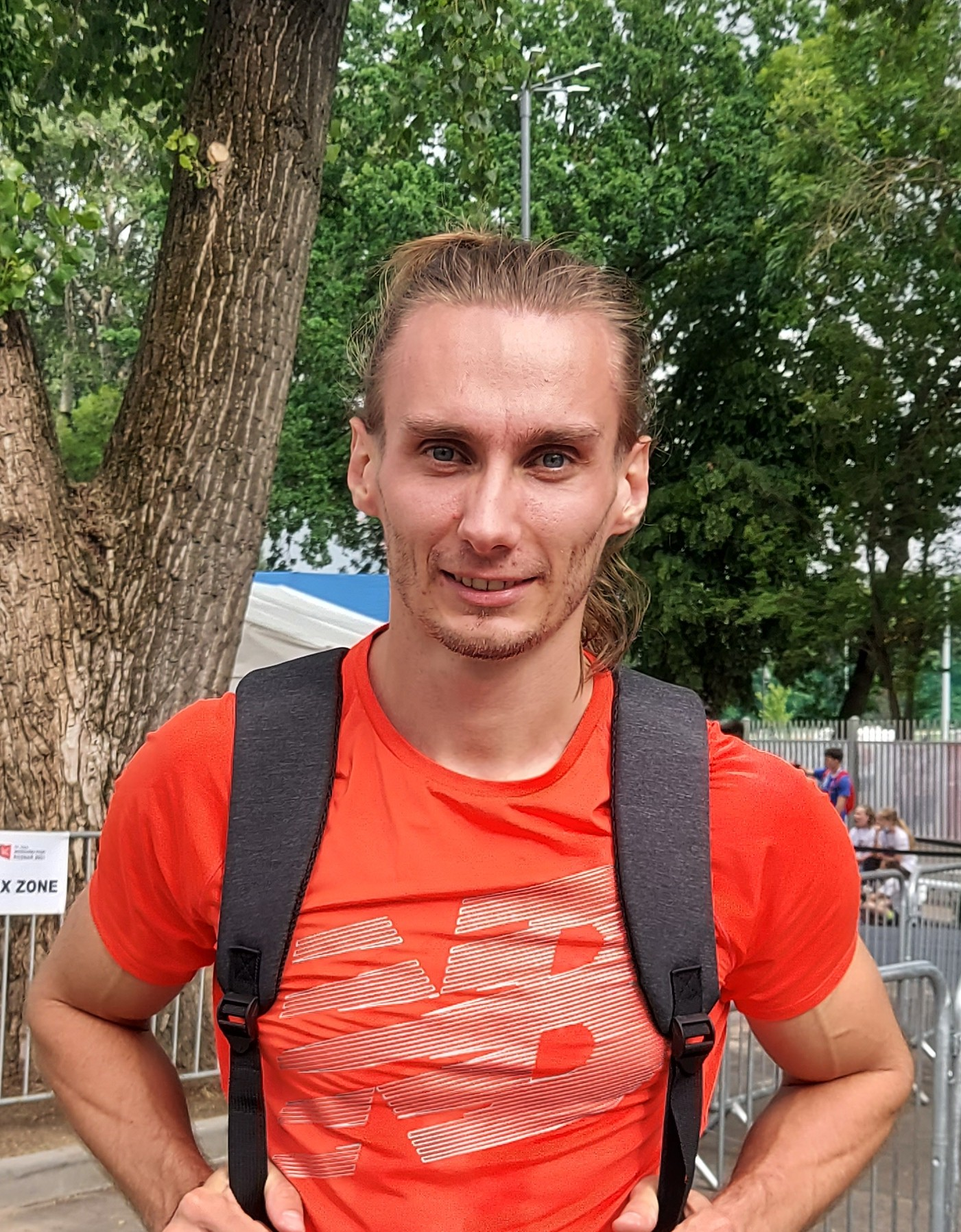
- Zalewski in 2021

Personal information
- Nationality: Polish
- Born: 7 August 1993 (age 32) Reszel, Poland
- Height: 1.89 m (6 ft 2 in)
- Weight: 86 kg (190 lb)

Sport
- Sport: Running
- Event: Sprints
Medal record
Men's athletics
Representing Poland
Olympic Games
Gold medal – first place	2020 Tokyo	4 × 400 m mixed
World Indoor Championships
Gold medal – first place	2018 Birmingham	4 × 400 m relay
European Indoor Championships
Silver medal – second place	2015 Prague	4 × 400 m relay
European Team Championships
Bronze medal – third place	2021 Chorzów	4 × 400 m relay
European U23 Championships
Gold medal – first place	2013 Tampere	200 m
Gold medal – first place	2015 Tallinn	200 m
Silver medal – second place	2013 Tampere	4 × 100 m relay
Silver medal – second place	2015 Tallinn	4 × 400 m relay
Polish Athletics Championships
Gold medal – first place	2013 Toruń	100 m
Gold medal – first place	2013 Toruń	200 m
Gold medal – first place	2014 Szczecin	100 m
Gold medal – first place	2014 Szczecin	200 m
Gold medal – first place	2015 Kraków	200 m
Gold medal – first place	2016 Bydgoszcz	100 m
Gold medal – first place	2016 Bydgoszcz	200 m
Gold medal – first place	2017 Białystok	100 m
Gold medal – first place	2017 Białystok	200 m
Gold medal – first place	2018 Lublin	400 m
Gold medal – first place	2019 Radom	4 × 100 m
Gold medal – first place	2020 Włocławek	400 m
Gold medal – first place	2022 Suwałki	400 m
Silver medal – second place	2015 Kraków	100 m
Silver medal – second place	2018 Lublin	200 m
Silver medal – second place	2019 Radom	400 m
Bronze medal – third place	2021 Poznań	400 m
Polish Indoor Athletics Championships
Gold medal – first place	2014 Sopot	200 m
Gold medal – first place	2015 Toruń	200 m
Gold medal – first place	2015 Toruń	400 m
Gold medal – first place	2016 Toruń	200 m
Gold medal – first place	2018 Toruń	200 m
Gold medal – first place	2019 Toruń	400 m
Gold medal – first place	2019 Toruń	4 × 200 m
Gold medal – first place	2021 Toruń	400 m
Silver medal – second place	2013 Spała	200 m
Bronze medal – third place	2018 Toruń	400 m

Karol Zalewski (Polish pronunciation: [ˈkarɔl zaˈlɛfski]; born 7 August 1993) is a Polish athlete who specialises in the sprinting events. He reached the semifinals of the 2013 World Championships in the 200 metres. He is also the 2013 European U23 champion over that distance.

== Career ==
The Polish quartet of Karol Zalewski, Rafał Omelko, Łukasz Krawczuk, Jakub Krzewina broke the world indoor record in the men's 4 × 400 m with a stunning finish to the final track event of the 2018 World Indoor Championships in Birmingham. Krzewina overtook the leaders from the beginning - Americans on the last straight and achieved the greatest success in their career.

Zalewski also competed for Poland at the 2016, 2020, and 2024 Summer Olympics.

== Competition record ==
Year	Competition	Venue	Position	Event	Notes
Representing Poland
2011	European Junior Championships	Tallinn, Estonia	–	200 m	DQ
2012	World Junior Championships	Barcelona, Spain	4th	200 m	20.54
2012	World Junior Championships	Barcelona, Spain	4th	4 × 100 m relay	39.47
2012	World Junior Championships	Barcelona, Spain	2nd	4 × 400 m relay	3:05.05
2013	European U23 Championships	Tampere, Finland	1st	200 m	20.41
2013	European U23 Championships	Tampere, Finland	2nd	4 × 100 m relay	38.81
2013	World Championships	Moscow, Russia	20th (sf)	200 m	20.66
2013	World Championships	Moscow, Russia	11th (h)	4 × 100 m relay	38.51
2014	World Relays	Nassau, Bahamas	13th	4 × 100 m relay	39.31
2014	European Championships	Zürich, Switzerland	8th	200 m	20.58
2014	European Championships	Zürich, Switzerland	6th	4 × 100 m relay	38.85
2015	European Indoor Championships	Prague, Czech Republic	6th (sf)	400 m	46.84
2015	European Indoor Championships	Prague, Czech Republic	2nd	4 × 400 m relay	3:02.97
2015	World Relays	Nassau, Bahamas	4th	4 × 200 m relay	1:22.85
2015	World Relays	Nassau, Bahamas	11th (h)	4 × 400 m relay	3:05.13
2015	European U23 Championships	Tallinn, Estonia	1st	200 m	20.49
2015	European U23 Championships	Tallinn, Estonia	–	4 × 100 m relay	DQ
2015	European U23 Championships	Tallinn, Estonia	2nd	4 × 400 m relay	3:05.35
2015	World Championships	Beijing, China	40th (h)	200 m	20.77
2016	European Championships	Amsterdam, Netherlands	8th (sf)	200 m	20.69
2016	European Championships	Amsterdam, Netherlands	6th	4 × 100 m relay	38.69
2016	Olympic Games	Rio de Janeiro, Brazil	37th (h)	200 m	20.54
2018	World Indoor Championships	Birmingham, United Kingdom	1st	4 × 400 m relay	3:01.77 WIR
2018	European Championships	Berlin, Germany	4th	400 m	45.34
2018	European Championships	Berlin, Germany	5th	4 × 400 m relay	3:02.27
2019	European Indoor Championships	Glasgow, United Kingdom	11th (h)	400 m	47.45^{1}
2019	World Relays	Yokohama, Japan	7th (B)	4 × 400 m relay	3:05.91
2021	World Relays	Chorzów, Poland	4th	4 × 200 m relay	DNF
2021	World Relays	Chorzów, Poland	9th (h)	4 × 400 m relay	3:05.04
2021	Olympic Games	Tokyo, Japan	47th (h)	400 m	2:15.38
2021	Olympic Games	Tokyo, Japan	5th	4 × 400 m relay	2:58.46
2021	Olympic Games	Tokyo, Japan	1st	4 × 400 m mixed relay	3:09.87 OR
2022	World Championships	Eugene, United States	9th	4 × 400 m relay	3:02.51
2022	European Championships	Munich, Germany	6th	400 m	45.62
2022	European Championships	Munich, Germany	9th (h)	4 × 400 m relay	3:02.95
2023	World Championships	Budapest, Hungary	39th (h)	400 m	46.53
2024	European Championships	Rome, Italy	10th (h)	400 m	45.80^{1}
2024	European Championships	Rome, Italy	–	4 × 400 m relay	DQ
2024	Olympic Games	Paris, France	12th (h)	4 × 400 m relay	3:01.21

^{1}Did not start in the semifinals

== Personal bests ==
Outdoor

- 100 metres – 10.25 (+0.9 m/s, Bydgoszcz 2013)
- 200 metres – 20.26 (-0.3 m/s, Sopot 2016)
- 400 metres – 45.11 (Berlin 2018)

Indoor

- 60 metres – 6.75 (Spała 2016)
- 200 metres – 20.64 (Toruń 2018)
- 400 metres – 46.20 (Toruń 2018)
