= Tymoteusz Zimny =

Polish sprinter

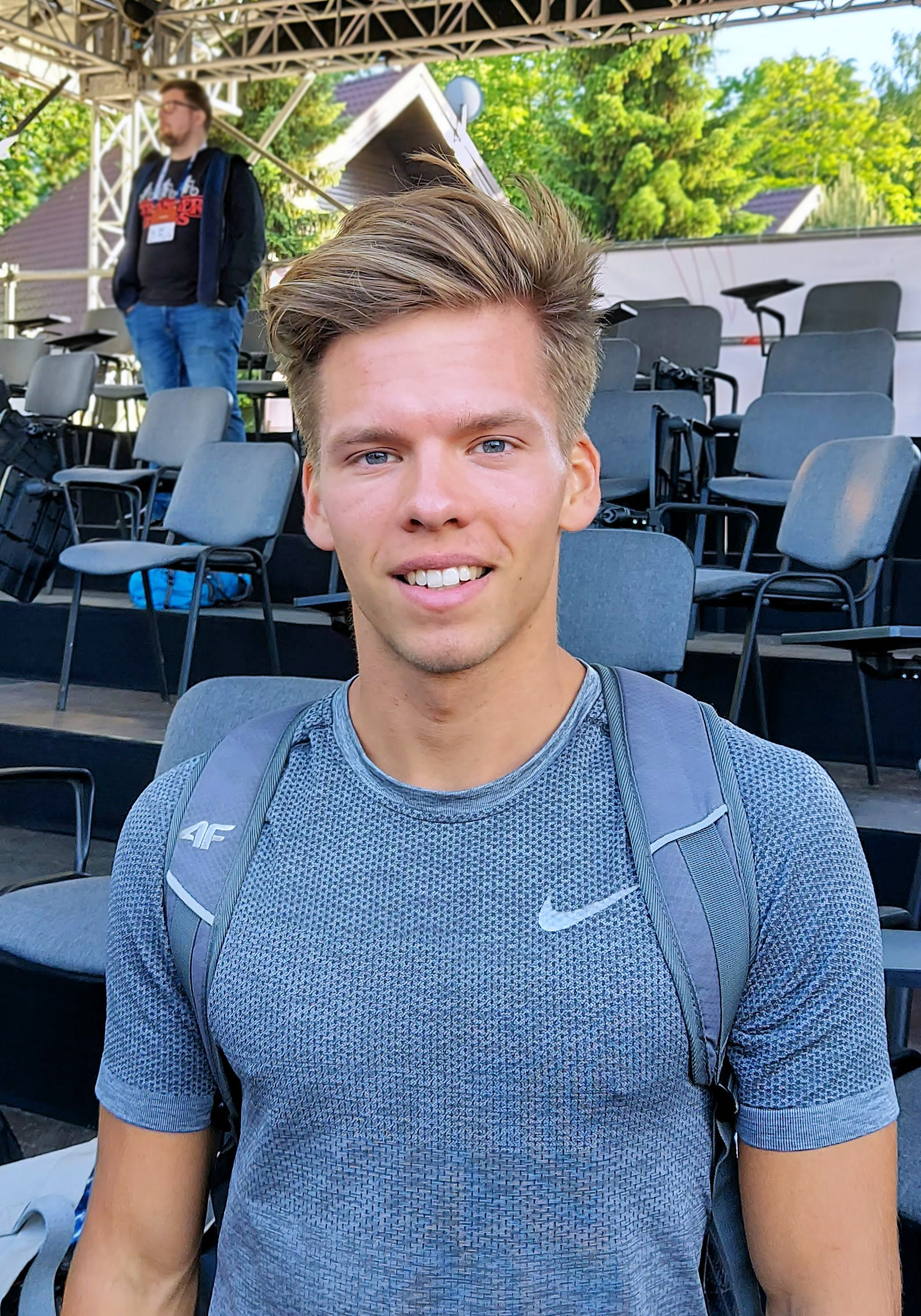

Personal information
- Born: 14 March 1998 (age 28) Biezdrowo, Poland

Sport
- Sport: Athletics
- Event: 400 metres
- Club: MKS Baszta Szamotuły
- Coached by: Roman Wiśniewski (before 2015); Krzysztof Węglarski (2015–present)
Medal record
European Athletics U20 Championships
Silver medal – second place	2017 Grosseto	400 m
Bronze medal – third place	2017 Grosseto	4 × 400 m
Polish Athletics Championships
Gold medal – first place	2018 Suwałki	4 × 400 m
Gold medal – first place	2019 Radom	4 × 400 m
Gold medal – first place	2021 Poznań	4 × 400 m
Gold medal – first place	2022 Suwałki	4 × 400 m
Polish Indoor Athletics Championships
Gold medal – first place	2021 Toruń	Mixed 4 × 400 m
Silver medal – second place	2022 Toruń	400 m
Bronze medal – third place	2019 Toruń	4 × 200 m
Bronze medal – third place	2020 Toruń	400 m

Tymoteusz Zimny (born 14 March 1998) is a Polish sprinter specialising in the 400 metres. He represented his country in the 4 × 400 metres relay at the 2017 World Championships reaching the final. Zimny also won two medals at the 2017 European U20 Championships.

== International competitions ==
Year	Competition	Venue	Position	Event	Notes
Representing Poland
2015	World Youth Championships	Cali, Colombia	12th (sf)	4 x 400 m relay	47.53
2016	World U20 Championships	Bydgoszcz, Poland	15th (sf)	400 m	47.14
2016	World U20 Championships	Bydgoszcz, Poland	9th (h)	4 x 400 m relay	3:09.42
2017	European U20 Championships	Grosseto, Italy	2nd	400 m	46.04
2017	European U20 Championships	Grosseto, Italy	3rd	4 x 400 m relay	3:09.32
2017	World Championships	London, United Kingdom	7th	4 × 400 m relay	3:01.59
2019	European Indoor Championships	Glasgow, United Kingdom	4th	4 × 400 m relay	3:08.40
2019	World Relays	Yokohama, Japan	7th (B)	4 × 400 m relay	3:05.91
2019	European U23 Championships	Gävle, Sweden	4th	400 m	46.52
2019	European U23 Championships	Gävle, Sweden	4th	4 × 400 m relay	3:07.37
2022	World Indoor Championships	Belgrade, Serbia	4th	4 × 400 m relay	3:07.81
2022	European Championships	Munich, Germany	9th (h)	4 × 400 m relay	3:02.95

== Personal bests ==
Outdoor

- 400 metres – 46.04 (Grosseto 2017)

Indoor

- 200 metres – 22.47 (Toruń 2016)
- 400 metres – 47.26 (Toruń 2017)
