= Piotr Tarkowski =

Polish long jumper (born 1999)

Personal information
- Nationality: Poland
- Born: 10 August 1999 (26 years, 357 days old)
- Home town: Biała Podlaska

Sport
- Sport: Athletics
- Events: Long jump 60 metres
- Club: KS AZS-AWF Biała Podlaska
- Coached by: Tadeusz Makaruk

Achievements and titles
- National finals: 2016 Polish U18s; • Long jump, 3rd (bronze); 2017 Polish Indoor U20s; • Long jump, 4th; 2017 Polish Indoors; • Long jump, 6th; 2018 Polish Indoor U20s; • Long jump, 1st (gold); 2018 Polish Indoors; • Long jump, 4th; 2018 Polish U20s; • Long jump, 1st (gold); 2018 Polish Champs; • Long jump, 2nd (silver); 2019 Polish Indoors; • 60m, 3rd (bronze); • Long jump, 3rd (bronze); 2019 Polish Champs; • Long jump, 4th; 2020 Polish Indoors; • Long jump, 2nd (silver); 2020 Polish Champs; • Long jump, 3rd (bronze); 2021 Polish Indoors; • Long jump, 4th; 2021 Polish Champs; • Long jump, 4th; 2021 Polish U23s; • High jump, 6th; • Long jump, 1st (gold); 2022 Polish Indoors; • Long jump, 1st (gold); 2022 Polish Champs; • Long jump, 1st (gold); 2023 Polish Champs; • Long jump, 3rd (bronze)
- Personal bests
- Updated on 15 January 2024

Piotr Tarkowski (born 10 August 1999) is a Polish long jumper. He is a national champion both at the Polish Indoor Athletics Championships and Polish Athletics Championships in the long jump.

== Biography ==
Tarkowski is from Biała Podlaska where he competes representing the KS AZS-AWF club, coached by Tadeusz Makaruk.

Tarkowski's first senior national medal came at the 2018 Polish Athletics Championships in Lublin, where he won the silver on his last attempt. Rather than clapping as is custom for long jumpers, he asked the crowd to remain silent for his 6th and final jump, which he performed in a personal best of 7.80 metres.

He was also the winner of the 2018 Polish U20 Championships held in Włocławek, and the 2018 Indoor Polish U20 Championships held in Toruń. He qualified for and participated in the 2018 World Athletics U20 Championships, and twice at the European U23 Championships in 2019 and 2021. At the 66th Polish Indoor Athletics Championships, he set a championship record with a result of 8.01 m to win the competition.

== Statistics ==
=== Best performances ===
Event	Mark	Place	Competition	Venue	Date	Ref
Long jump	8.03 m (+1.5 m/s)	1st place, gold medalist(s)	Polish Athletics Championships	Suwałki, Poland	10 June 2022	
60 metres	6.78	1st place, gold medalist(s)	Polish: Halowe Zawody Kontrolne WMOZLA	Warsaw, Poland	2 February 2020	
