= 2020 Polish Athletics Championships =

- Edition: 96th
- Dates: 28–30 August
- Host city: Włocławek, Poland
- Venue: Stadion OSiR-u
- Level: Senior
- Type: Outdoor

The 2020 Polish Athletics Championships was the 96th edition of the national championship in outdoor track and field for athletes in Poland. It was held between 28 and 30 August at the Stadion OSiR-u in Włocławek.

The event was originally scheduled for 25–27 June but was postponed due to the COVID-19 pandemic. This was originally meant to serve as qualification for the national team at the 2020 European Athletics Championships, but that event was also cancelled.

== Championships ==
Events	Edition	Dates	Location	Notes
Track and field	96th	28–30 August	Włocławek	
24-hour run	13th	28–30 August	Pabianice	Originally scheduled for 24 April
100 kilometres run	12th	28–30 August	Pabianice	Originally scheduled for 16 April
Half marathon	29th	4 September	Bydgoszcz	Held within the PKO Bydgoszcz Running Festival, originally scheduled for Piła on 6 September
10,000 metres	—	19 September	Karpacz	Originally scheduled for 25 April
20 kilometres race walk	—	26 September	Warsaw	Originally scheduled for June 14 in Mielec
Relay races Combined events	3rd	3–4 October	Łódź	Originally scheduled for 30–31 May. First time 2 × 2 × 400 m event was held.
50 kilometres race walk	—	24 October	Dudince, Slovakia	Originally scheduled for 21 March, women's event was cancelled entirely.
10K run	11th	11 November	Poznań	Originally men's race was scheduled for 1 August in Gdańsk but postponed and held at same time as women's race.
Cross country running	92nd	28 November	Kwidzyn	Originally scheduled for 21 March
Marathon	90th (men); 40th (women)	6 December	Oleśno	Originally scheduled for 5 April and 15 November
5K run	9th	Cancelled	Cancelled	Originally scheduled for 20 June (men) and 26 April (women) in Warsaw, but cancelled entirely due to COVID-19 pandemic.

== Results ==
=== Men ===
Event	Gold		Silver		Bronze	
100 metres	Remigiusz Olszewski; CWZS Zawisza Bydgoszcz SL	10.51	Dominik Kopeć; KS Agros Zamość Przemysław Słowikowski; AZS-AWF Katowice	10.56	Not awarded	
200 metres	Łukasz Krawczuk; WKS Śląsk Wrocław	21.18	Adrian Brzeziński; MKL Toruń	21.25	Oliwer Wdowik; CWKS Resovia Rzeszów	21.27
400 metres	Karol Zalewski; AZS-AWF Katowice	46.35	Mateusz Rzeźniczak; RKS Łódź	46.62 =SB	Dariusz Kowaluk; AZS-AWF Warszawa	46.80
800 metres	Krzysztof Różnicki; GKS Cartusia Kartuzy	1:47.73	Michał Rozmys; UKS Barnim Goleniów	1:47.80	Mateusz Borkowski; RKS Łódź	1:48.30
1500 metres	Michał Rozmys; UKS Barnim Goleniów	3:53.09 SB	Marcin Lewandowski; CWZS Zawisza Bydgoszcz SL	3:54.13	Mateusz Borkowski; RKS Łódź	3:55.64 SB
5000 metres	Szymon Kulka; WKS Grunwald Poznań	14:03.02	Kamil Jastrzębski; SKB Kraśnik	14:04.62 PB	Patryk Kozłowski; RLTL ZTE Radom	14:06.01 PB
10,000 metres	Krystian Zalewski; UKS Barnim Goleniów	28:59.88	Szymon Kulka; WKS Grunwald Poznań	29:13.14	Adam Nowicki; MKL Szczecin	29:23.35
10K run	Kamil Karbowiak; LZS KL Kotwica	29:14	Kamil Jastrzębski; SKB Kraśnik	29:32	Arkadiusz Gardzielewski; WKS Śląsk Wrocław	29:55
Half marathon	Adam Nowicki; MKL Szczecin	1:04:58	Adam Głogowski; UKS Ekonomik-Maratończyk Lębork	1:05:29 PB	Damian Kabat; WMLKS Pomorze Stargard	1:05:33 PB
Marathon	Kamil Jastrzębski; SKB Kraśnik	2:12:58	Adam Nowicki; MKL Szczecin	2:13:45	Kamil Karbowiak; LZS Kl Kotwica Brzeg	2:15:06
100 kilometres	Dariusz Nożyński; RK Athletics	06:54:17	Kamil Leśniak; Salco Garmin Team	06:55:35	Andrzej Piotrowski; WKS Wawel	07:01:00
24-hour run	Leszek Małyszek; AZS AWF Katowice	260,027 m	Rafał Kot; Muay Running Team	255,772 m	Andrzej Mazur; LKS Zantyr Sztum	252,036 m
Cross country 4 km	Marcin Lewandowski; CWZS Zawisza Bydgoszcz SL	11:21	Patryk Kozłowski; RLTL ZTE Radom	11:23	Oliwier Mutwil; CKS Budowlani Częstochowa	11:27
Cross country 8 km	Tomasz Grycko; UKS Bliza Władysławowo	23:34	Kamil Jastrzębski; SKB Kraśnik	23:45	Błażej Brzeziński; CWZS Zawisza Bydgoszcz SL	24:16
3000 m s'chase	Mateusz Kaczmarek; BKS Szczecin	8:57.88 SB	Szymon Topolnicki; AZS-AWF Katowice	9:00.61	Mateusz Kaczor; RLTL ZTE Radom	9:01.65 SB
110 m hurdles	Damian Czykier; KS Podlasie Białystok	13.92	Dawid Żebrowski; RLTL ZTE Radom	13.97	Krzysztof Kiljan; AZS-AWF Warszawa	14.09
400 m hurdles	Patryk Dobek; MKL Szczecin	50.07 SB	Gabriel Mikołajewski; RLTL ZTE Radom	50.20 PB	Jakub Olejniczak; OŚ AZS Poznań	51.08
4 × 100 m relay	KS Podlasie Białystok; Radosław Sacharczuk; Damian Czykier; Artur Łęczycki; Rafał Łupiński	40.40	OS AZS Poznań; Krzysztof Grześkowiak; Mateusz Siuda; Jakub Gałandziej; Patryk Wykrota	40.53	AZS-AWF Warszawa; Krzysztof Kiljan; Szymon Dziuba; Wiktor Suwara; Dominik Staskiewicz	40.68
4 × 200 m relay	MKS Juvenia Białystok; Mateusz Kwiatkowski; Jakub Jabłoński; Bartosz Dudek; Ernest Jaroszewicz	1:28.46	ULKS MOSiR Sieradz; Jarosław Gołąb; Szymon Grzegorzewski; Jakub Pędziwiatr; Patryk Pawłowski	1:29.48	BKL Bełchatów; Mateusz Górny; Mateusz Szaniec; Adam Patrzyk; Filip Chrosta	1:29.85
4 × 400 m relay	RKS Łódź; Jakub Szkudlarek; Adam Kszczot; Mateusz Borkowski; Mateusz Rzeźniczak	3:11.40	AZS UMCS Lublin; Mikołaj Kotyra; Cezary Mirosław; Karol Kania; Andrzej Jaros	3:11.48	OŚ AZS Poznań; Jakub Olejniczak; Mikołaj Buzała; Robert Bryliński; Amadeusz Zdrojewski	3:12.90
10,000 m walk	Dawid Tomala; AZS KU Politechniki Opolskiej Opole	41:39.70	Łukasz Niedziałek; WLKS Nowe Iganie	41:46.46	Jakub Jelonek; CKS Budowlani Częstochowa	41:50.31
20 km walk	Dawid Tomala; AZS KU Politechniki Opolskiej	1:24:44	Rafał Augustyn; LKS Stal Mielec	1:24:52	Łukasz Niedziałek; WLKS Nowe Iganie	1:26:25
50 km walk	Rafał Augustyn; LKS Stal Mielec	3:47:42	Rafał Fedaczyński; AZS UMCS Lublin	3:56:31	Jakub Jelonek; CKS Budowlani Częstochowa	4:08:33
High jump	Norbert Kobielski; MKS Inowrocław	2.26	Jakub Hołub; AZS UMCS Lublin	2.12 PB	Bartłomiej Bedeniczuk; KS AZS-AWF Biała Podlaska	2.07
Pole vault	Paweł Wojciechowski; CWZS Zawisza Bydgoszcz SL	5.61 SB	Robert Sobera; KS AZS AWF Wrocław	5.21	Sebastian Chmara; CWZS Zawisza Bydgoszcz SL	4.80
Long jump	Mateusz Jopek; KS AZS AWF Wrocław	7.82	Andrzej Kuch; UMLKS START Wieruszów	7.75	Piotr Tarkowski; KS AZS-AWF Biała Podlaska	7.68 SB
Triple jump	Adrian Świderski; WKS Śląsk Wrocław	16.38 SB	Karol Hoffmann; AZS UMCS Lublin	16.29 SB	Jan Kulmaczewski; UKS Kapry-armexim Pruszków	15.64 =SB
Shot put	Michał Haratyk; KS Sprint Bielsko-Biała	20.64	Jakub Szyszkowski; AZS-AWF Katowice	20.49	Konrad Bukowiecki; KS AZS UWM Olsztyn	19.97
Discus throw	Bartłomiej Stój; AZS KU Politechniki Opolskiej Opole	63.05	Robert Urbanek; MKS Aleksandrów Łódzki	62.48	Piotr Małachowski; WKS Śląsk Wrocław	60.15
Hammer throw	Wojciech Nowicki; KS Podlasie Białystok	80.28 SB	Paweł Fajdek; AZS-AWF Katowice	78.61 SB	Marcin Wrotyński; OŚ AZS Poznań	70.33
Javelin throw	Marcin Krukowski; KS Warszawianka W-wa	83.51	Cyprian Mrzygłód; AZS-AWFiS Gdańsk	76.86	Hubert Chmielak; LUKS Hańcza Suwałki	76.52
Decathlon	Rafał Horbowicz; Warszawianka	7478 pts SB	Jacek Chochorowski; AZS KU Politechniki Opolskiej	7315 pts PB	Aleksy Boroń; UKS LA Basket Warszawa	6875 pts PB

=== Women ===
Event	Gold		Silver		Bronze	
100 metres	Ewa Swoboda; AZS-AWF Katowice	11.52	Pia Skrzyszowska; AZS-AWF Warszawa	11.76	Klaudia Adamek; KS Gwardia Piła	11.81
200 metres	Marlena Gola; KS Podlasie Białystok	23.64	Martyna Kotwiła; RLTL ZTE Radom	23.84	Olga Pietrzak; AZS-AWFiS Gdańsk	24.08
400 metres	Justyna Święty-Ersetic; AZS-AWF Katowice	51.44 SB	Iga Baumgart-Witan; BKS Bydgoszcz	52.14 SB	Małgorzata Hołub-Kowalik; AZS UMCS Lublin	52.23
800 metres	Joanna Jóźwik; AZS-AWF Katowice	2:04.52	Angelika Cichocka; SKLA Sopot	2:04.64	Anna Sabat; CWKS Resovia Rzeszów	2:05.12
1500 metres	Sofia Ennaoui; AZS UMCS Lublin	4:15.89 SB	Klaudia Kazimierska; LKS Vectra Włocławek	4:18.25	Renata Pliś; MKL Maraton Świnoujście	4:19.41
5000 metres	Katarzyna Jankowska; KS Podlasie Białystok	16:06.02	Sylwia Indeka; LKS Pszczyna	16:08.07	Renata Pliś; MKL Maraton Świnoujście	16:09.68
10,000 metres	Katarzyna Jankowska; KS Podlasie Białystok	33:10.52	Izabela Paszkiewicz; AZS UMCS Lublin	33:14.34 PB	Aleksandra Lisowska; KS AZS UWM Olsztyn	33:42.21 PB
10K run	Aleksandra Lisowska; KS AZS UWM Olsztyn	33:05	Monika Jackiewicz; MKL Szczecin	33:11	Aleksandra Brzezińska; MKL Toruń	33:13
Half marathon	Angelika Mach; AZS UMCS Lublin	1:13:57 PB	Monika Jackiewicz; MKL Szczecin	1:16:09 PB	Joanna Dorociak; Air Zone Warszawa	1:17:28 PB
Marathon	Aleksandra Lisowska; AZS UWM Olsztyn	2:30:47 PB	Aleksandra Brzezińska; MKL Toruń	2:35:20	Anna Bańkowska; KS Podlasie Białystok	2:37:56
100 kilometres	Dominika Stelmach; RK Athletics	07:04:36	Magdalena Ziółek; Olej Running Team	08:23:30	Milena Grabska-Grzegorczyk; UKS Azymut Pabianice	08:31:07
24-hour run	Małgorzata Pazda-Pozorska; Poltarex	260,679 m AR	Patrycja Bereznowska; Wieliszew Heron Team	241,218 m	Aneta Rajda; TL Pogoń Ruda Śląska	233,611 m
Cross country 4 km	Paulina Kaczyńska; WMLKS Pomorze Stargard	12:42	Beata Topka; ULKS Talex Borzytuchom	12:45	Sylwia Indeka; LKS Pszczyna	12:52
Cross country 6 km	Aleksandra Brzezińska; MKL Toruń	20:03	Anna Bańkowska; KS Podlasie Białystok	20:22	Weronika Lizakowska; KUKS Remus Kościerzyna	20:27
3000 m s'chase	Matylda Kowal; CWKS Resovia Rzeszów	9:57.16 SB	Mariola Ślusarczyk; UKS Barnim Goleniów	10:06.56 SB	Patrycja Kapała; AZS-AWF Katowice	10:11.51 SB
100 m hurdles	Karolina Kołeczek; AZS UMCS Lublin	13.04	Klaudia Wojtunik; AZS Łódź	13.27	Zuzanna Hulisz; MKL Toruń	13.52
400 m hurdles	Joanna Linkiewicz; KS AZS AWF Wrocław	56.23	Natalia Wosztyl; RLTL ZTE Radom	57.40 SB	Julia Korzuch; AZS-AWF Katowice	58.12
4 × 100 m relay	AZS-AWF Katowice; Paulina Guzowska; Magdalena Stefanowicz; Natalia Węglarz; Ewa Swoboda	44.79	RLTL ZTE Radom; Martyna Osińska; Natalia Wosztyl; Izabela Smolińska; Martyna Kotwiła	45.51	AZS-AWF Warszawa; Natalia Duchnowska; Justyna Paluch; Paulina Paluch; Anna Wojcieszek	45.52
4 × 200 m relay	AZS-AWF Warszawa; Anna Wojcieszek; Justyna Paluch; Natalia Duchnowska; Paulina Paluch	1:37.92	MKS Agros Chełm; Paulina Zielińska; Izabela Jastrząb; Sylwia Ciupek; Agata Wasiluk	1:39.72	SKLA Sopot; Weronika Zmarzła; Aleksandra Formella; Blanka Zapora; Monika Pietroń	1:42.84
4 × 400 m relay	KS AZS AWF Wrocław; Anna Pałys; Natalia Widawska; Joanna Linkiewicz; Natalia Kaczmarek	3:36.83	AZS-AWF Katowice; Adrianna Janowicz; Joanna Jóźwik; Julia Korzuch; Justyna Święty-Ersetic	3:36.85	AZS UMCS Lublin; Alicja Wrona; Wiktoria Drozd; Natalia Pietruczuk; Małgorzata Hołub-Kowalik	3:38.31
5000 m walk	Katarzyna Zdziebło; LKS Stal Mielec	21:13.69 PB	Olga Niedziałek; WLKS Nowe Iganie	22:35.03	Agnieszka Ellward; WKS Flota Gdynia	23:11.98
20 km walk	Katarzyna Zdziebło; LKS Stal Mielec	1:30:41 PB	Agnieszka Ellward; WKS Flota Gdynia	1:41:30	Olga Niedziałek; WLKS Nowe Iganie	1:42:11
High jump	Kamila Lićwinko; KS Podlasie Białystok	1.86 SB	Aneta Rydz; RLTL ZTE Radom	1.80 SB	Paulina Ligarska; SKLA Sopot	1.77
Pole vault	Wiktoria Wojewódzka; OSOT Szczecin	4.20 =PB	Kamila Przybyła; CWZS Zawisza Bydgoszcz SL	4.20 =SB	Anna Łyko; MKS MOS Wrocław	4.00
Long jump	Joanna Kuryło; KS AZS AWF Wrocław	6.35	Magdalena Żebrowska; KS Podlasie Białystok	6.23	Karolina Młodawska; KKL Kielce	6.16
Triple jump	Karolina Młodawska; KKL Kielce	13.55 PB	Adrianna Szóstak; OŚ AZS Poznań	13.52 SB	Agnieszka Bednarek; AZS Łódź	13.45 SB
Shot put	Paulina Guba; AZS UMCS Lublin	18.09 SB	Klaudia Kardasz; KS Podlasie Białystok	17.34	Maja Ślepowrońska; AZS-AWF Warszawa	16.80 PB
Discus throw	Daria Zabawska; AZS UMCS Lublin	55.28	Karolina Urban; AZS-AWFiS Gdańsk	54.50	Nina Staruch; AZS-AWF Warszawa	49.59
Hammer throw	Katarzyna Furmanek; KKL Kielce	72.85	Malwina Kopron; AZS UMCS Lublin	70.94	Joanna Fiodorow; OŚ AZS Poznań	67.19
Javelin throw	Maria Andrejczyk; LUKS Hańcza Suwałki	62.66 SB	Aleksandra Ostrowska; AZS-AWFiS Gdańsk	52.84	Joanna Hajdrowska; RLTL ZTE Radom	51.46 SB
Heptathlon	Paulina Ligarska; SKLA Sopot	5634 pts	Adrianna Sułek; CWZS Zawisza Bydgoszcz SL	5537 pts	Barbara Kostrzewska; UKS LA Basket Warszawa	5044 pts PB

=== Mixed ===
Event	Gold		Silver		Bronze	
4 × 400 m relay	MKS Agros Chełm; Agata Wasiluk; Łukasz Bańka; Paulina Zielińska; Remigiusz Zazula	3:38.80	AKL Ursynów Warszawa; Julia Sokołowska; Mikołaj Garstecki; Zofia Lesiuk; Stanisław Zieliński	3:43.99	UKS Czwórka Żory; Magda Czajkowska; Cyprian Brilla; Patrycja Stępka; Damian Kania	3:52.19
2 × 2 × 400 m relay	KS Podlasie Białystok; Justyna Jelska; Maksymilian Klepacki	4:01.29	SRS Kondycja Piaseczno; Aleksandra Płocińska; Bartosz Kucharski	4:04.40	MKS Juvenia Białystok; Justyna Kaczmarczyk; Bartosz Dudek	4:09.59
4 × 800 m relay	MKS-MOSM Bytom; Maciej Wyderka; Michalina Typer; Alicja Wójcik; Mateusz Kuchman	8:21.06	KS Podlasie Białystok; Marcin Hołowienko; Paulina Mikiewicz-Łapińska; Justyna Jelska; Andrzej Jankowski	8:39.99	Only two team started	
