= European Veterans Championships =

European Veterans Championships may refer to:

- European Veterans Table Tennis Championships, associated with the European Table Tennis Championships
- European Veterans Judo Championships, associated with the European Judo Championships
- European Masters Athletics Championships, formerly known as the European Veterans Championships
  - European Masters Indoor Athletics Championships, the indoor edition also formerly known as the Veterans Championships
