= 2019 European Athletics U23 Championships – Men's 400 metres =

The men's 400 metres event at the 2019 European Athletics U23 Championships was held in Gävle, Sweden, at Gavlehof Stadium Park on 11, 12, and 13 July.

== Medalists ==
Gold	Silver	Bronze
Fabrisio Saïdy; France	Cameron Chalmers; Great Britain	Brayan Lopez; Italy

== Records ==
Prior to the competition, the records were as follows:

European U23 record	Thomas Schönlebe (GDR)	44.33	Rome, Italy	3 September 1987
Championship U23 record	Leslie Djhone (FRA)	45.04	Bydgoszcz, Poland	19 July 2003

== Results ==
=== Heats ===
Qualification rule: First 3 (Q) and the next 4 fastest (q) qualified for the semifinals.

Rank	Heat	Name	Nationality	Time	Notes
1	2	Franko Burraj	Albania	47.14	Q
2	4	Tymoteusz Zimny	Poland	47.16	Q
3	2	Vladimir Aceti	Italy	47.30	Q
4	2	Fabrisio Saïdy	France	47.31	Q
5	4	Lovro Mesec Košir	Slovenia	47.32	Q
6	1	Cameron Chalmers	Great Britain	47.33	Q
7	3	Alexander Doom	Belgium	47.39	Q
8	4	Fredrik Øvereng	Norway	47.48	Q, PB
9	3	Charles Devantay	Switzerland	47.50	Q
10	4	Akın Özyürek	Turkey	47.55	q
11	1	Maciej Hołub	Poland	47.63	Q
12	4	Dominik Hufnagl	Austria	47.67	q
13	1	Brayan Lopez	Italy	47.67	Q
14	3	Jovan Stojoski	North Macedonia	47.68	Q, PB
15	4	João Ricardo Coelho	Portugal	47.70	q
16	4	Benjamin Lobo Vedel	Denmark	47.78	q
17	2	Robert Parge	Romania	47.80	
18	2	Rok Ferlan	Slovenia	47.84	
19	1	Cathal Crosbie	Ireland	47.98	
20	1	Vincent Notz	Switzerland	47.93	
21	3	Eran Siboni	Israel	47.99	
22	2	Christopher O'Donnell	Ireland	48.04	
23	3	Austris Karpinskis	Latvia	48.05	
24	2	Mauro Pereira	Portugal	48.07	
25	3	Thomas Pitkin	Ireland	48.23	
26	3	Mihail Pappas	Greece	48.49	
27	1	Zeno Moraru	Romania	48.53	
28	4	Filippo Moggi	Switzerland	48.65	
29	1	Nico Garea	Austria	48.68	
30	1	Valērijs Valiņščikovs	Latvia	49.24	
31	3	Mihai Cristian Pislaru	Romania	49.29	
32	2	Alessandro Gasperoni	San Marino	49.85	

=== Semifinals ===
Qualification: First 3 in each heat (Q) and next 2 fastest (q) qualified for the final.

Rank	Heat	Name	Nationality	Time	Notes
1	1	Fabrisio Saïdy	France	46.34	Q
2	2	Brayan Lopez	Italy	46.34	Q, PB
3	2	Cameron Chalmers	Great Britain	46.39	Q
4	2	Tymoteusz Zimny	Poland	46.41	Q, SB
5	1	Franko Burraj	Albania	46.66	Q
6	2	Lovro Mesec Košir	Slovenia	46.91	q
7	1	Jovan Stojoski	North Macedonia	47.02	Q, PB
8	1	Vladimir Aceti	Italy	47.03	q
9	1	Benjamin Lobo Vedel	Denmark	47.17	
10	2	Charles Devantay	Switzerland	47.18	
11	1	Maciej Hołub	Poland	47.34	
12	1	Akın Özyürek	Turkey	47.48	
13	2	Dominik Hufnagl	Austria	47.48	SB
14	2	João Coelho	Portugal	47.49	SB
15	2	Fredrik Øvereng	Norway	48.18	
	1	Alexander Doom	Belgium	DQ	R163.3(a)

=== Final ===
Rank	Lane	Name	Nationality	Time	Notes
1st place, gold medalist(s)	6	Fabrisio Saïdy	France	45.79	EU23L, PB
2nd place, silver medalist(s)	5	Cameron Chalmers	Great Britain	45.92	SB
3rd place, bronze medalist(s)	3	Brayan Lopez	Italy	46.16	PB
4	7	Tymoteusz Zimny	Poland	46.52	
5	4	Franko Burraj	Albania	46.79	
6	8	Jovan Stojoski	North Macedonia	47.01	PB
7	1	Vladimir Aceti	Italy	47.16	
8	2	Lovro Mesec Košir	Slovenia	47.32	
