= 2024 European Masters Indoor Athletics Championships =

European Masters Indoor Athletics Championships 2024
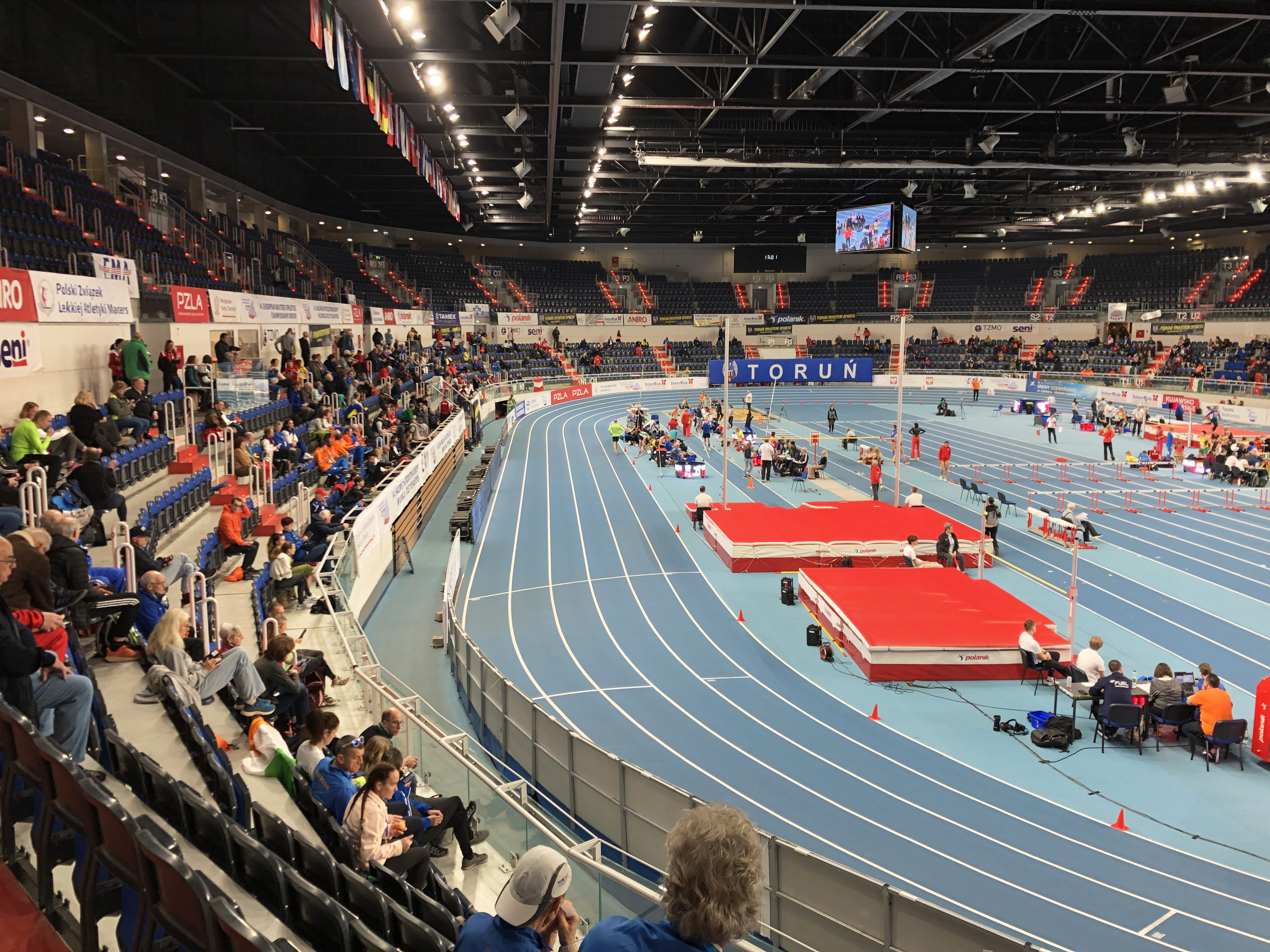
- Arena Toruń during the championships
- Organisers: European Masters Athletics
- Edition: 14th
- Dates: 17–23 March
- Host city: Toruń
- Level: Masters
- Type: Indoor
- Events: 47
- Participation: 3445 athletes from 39 nations
- Official website: https://emaci2024.com/

The European Masters Indoor Athletics Championships 2024 (European Masters Athletics Championships – Indoor) were the 14th edition of the European Masters Indoor Athletics Championships and were held in Arena Toruń, in Toruń, Poland, from 17 to 23 March 2024.

There was a total of 3445 participants from 39 countries competing. 47 events were held, 23 for woman, 23 for men and 1 mixed. Poland headed the medal table on 102 gold medals.

== Medals table ==
* Host nation (Poland)

Rank	Nation	Gold	Silver	Bronze	Total
1	Poland (POL)*	102	78	70	250
2	Germany (GER)	94	90	77	261
3	Spain (ESP)	56	33	39	128
4	Great Britain (GBR)	50	62	53	165
5	France (FRA)	32	37	27	96
6	Italy (ITA)	25	31	26	82
7	Ireland (IRL)	23	18	21	62
8	Sweden (SWE)	22	26	16	64
9	Finland (FIN)	22	24	18	64
10	Norway (NOR)	16	8	13	37
11	Netherlands (NED)	13	3	3	19
12	Greece (GRE)	11	7	8	26
13	Austria (AUT)	10	7	5	22
14	Denmark (DEN)	9	7	13	29
15	Czech Republic (CZE)	8	15	16	39
16	Ukraine (UKR)	8	8	6	22
17	Latvia (LAT)	7	12	15	34
18	Slovenia (SLO)	7	0	4	11
19	Estonia (EST)	5	7	5	17
20	Romania (ROU)	4	6	3	13
21	Lithuania (LTU)	4	5	11	20
22	Switzerland (SUI)	4	3	1	8
23	Belgium (BEL)	3	4	7	14
24	Portugal (POR)	3	4	4	11
25	Slovakia (SVK)	2	7	5	14
26	Hungary (HUN)	2	3	7	12
27	Luxembourg (LUX)	2	2	1	5
28	Bulgaria (BUL)	2	1	1	4
29	Israel (ISR)	2	1	0	3
30	Turkey (TUR)	1	2	1	4
31	Serbia (SRB)	1	0	1	2
32	Albania (ALB)	0	1	0	1
32	Croatia (CRO)	0	1	0	1
34	Iceland (ISL)	0	0	1	1
34	Malta (MLT)	0	0	1	1
34	San Marino (SMR)	0	0	1	1
Totals (36 entries)		550	513	480	1,543
