= 2018 Polish Athletics Championships =

- Dates: 20-22 July
- Host city: Lublin, Poland
- Venue: Stadion START Lublin
- Level: Senior
- Type: Outdoor

The 2018 Polish Athletics Championships was the 94th edition of the national championship in outdoor track and field for athletes in Poland. It was held between 20 and 22 July 2018 in Lublin.

== Medal summary ==
=== Men ===
Event	Gold			Silver			Bronze		
100 metres	Dominik Kopeć	KS Agros Zamość	10.26 PB	Remigiusz Olszewski	CWZS Zawisza Bydgoszcz SL	10.31	Przemysław Słowikowski	WKS Flota Gdynia	10.34
200 metres	Dominik Kopeć	KS Agros Zamość	20.70	Karol Zalewski	AZS-AWF Katowice	20.73	Przemysław Słowikowski	WKS Flota Gdynia	21.06
400 metres	Karol Zalewski	AZS-AWF Katowice	45.53	Łukasz Krawczuk	WKS Śląsk Wrocław	46.04	Dariusz Kowaluk	AZS-AWF Warszawa	46.06 PB
800 metres	Marcin Lewandowski	CWZS Zawisza Bydgoszcz SL	1:50.27	Mateusz Borkowski	RKS Łódź	1:50.37	Michał Rozmys	UKS Barnim Goleniów	1:51.02
1500 metres	Adam Kszczot	RKS Łódź	3:46.24	Adam Czerwiński	UKS Lider Siercza	3:46.77	Michał Rozmys	UKS Barnim Goleniów	3:46.78
5000 metres	Krystian Zalewski	UKS Barnim Goleniów	14:15.59	Robert Głowala	GKS Wilga Garwolin	14:18.74	Dawid Malina	TL ROW Rybnik	14:20.44
3000 m s'chase	Krystian Zalewski	UKS Barnim Goleniów	8:40.45	Łukasz Oślizło	AZS-AWF Katowice	8:51.33	Szymon Topolnicki	AZS-AWF Katowice	9:02.03
110 m hurdles	Damian Czykier	KS Podlasie Białystok	13.37	Artur Noga	SKLA Sopot	13.56	Dominik Bochenek	CWZS Zawisza Bydgoszcz SL	13.79
400 m hurdles	Patryk Dobek	MKL Szczecin	49.16	Jakub Mordyl	KS AZS AWF Kraków	50.31	Robert Bryliński	OŚ AZS Poznań	50.67
10,000 m walk	Dawid Tomala	AZS KU Politechniki Opolskiej Opole	40:17.62	Artur Brzozowski	AZS-AWF Katowice	40:20.59	Rafał Sikora	AZS-AWF Katowice	41:57.84
High jump	Maciej Grynienko	UKS Orlica Domaniów	2.21	Sylwester Bednarek	RKS Łódź	2.21	Norbert Kobielski Maciej Lepiato	MKS Inowrocław GZSN START Gorzów Wlkp.	2.09
Pole vault	Paweł Wojciechowski	CWZS Zawisza Bydgoszcz SL	5.70	Piotr Lisek	OSOT Szczecin	5.70	Robert Sobera	KS AZS AWF Wrocław	5.30
Long jump	Tomasz Jaszczuk	WLKS Nowe Iganie	8.10	Piotr Tarkowski	KS AZS-AWF Biała Podlaska	7.80 PB	Mateusz Różański	KU AZS PWSZ w Tarnowie	7.73
Triple jump	Adrian Świderski	WKS Śląsk Wrocław	15.89	Bartosz Bonecki	AZS Łódź	15.72	Jan Kulmaczewski	UKS Karpaty-armexim Pruszków	15.50w
Shot put	Michał Haratyk	KS Sprint Bielsko-Biała	21.85 CR	Konrad Bukowiecki	KS AZS UWM Olsztyn	21.04	Jakub Szyszkowski	WKS Śląsk Wrocław	20.18
Discus throw	Piotr Małachowski	WKS Śląsk Wrocław	65.78	Robert Urbanek	MKS Aleksandrów Łódzki	62.91	Bartłomiej Stój	AZS KU Politechniki Opolskiej Opole	61.07
Hammer throw	Wojciech Nowicki	KS Podlasie Białystok	80.26	Paweł Fajdek	KS Agros Zamość	80.14	Arkadiusz Rogowski	KS Agros Zamość	70.19
Javelin throw	Marcin Krukowski	KS Warszawianka	82.87	Cyprian Mrzygłód	AZS-AWFiS Gdańsk	80.76	Dawid Kościów	(LKS Jantar Ustka	80.64 PB

=== Women ===
Event	Gold			Silver			Bronze		
100 metres	Ewa Swoboda	AZS-AWF Katowice	11.12w	Anna Kiełbasińska	SKLA Sopot	11.23w	Kamila Ciba	OŚ AZS Poznań	11.45w
200 metres	Martyna Kotwiła	RLTL ZTE Radom	22.99 PB, NL	Anna Kiełbasińska	SKLA Sopot	23.10	Agata Forkasiewicz	KS AZS AWF Wrocław	23.77
400 metres	Małgorzata Hołub-Kowalik	KL Bałtyk Koszalin	51.18 CR PB	Justyna Święty-Ersetic	AZS-AWF Katowice	51.26	Iga Baumgart	BKS Bydgoszcz	51.73
800 metres	Anna Sabat	CWKS Resovia Rzeszów	2:06.14	Angelika Cichocka	SKLA Sopot	2:06.37	Paulina Mikiewicz-Łapińska	KS Podlasie Białystok	2:07.29
1500 metres	Sofia Ennaoui	MKL Szczecin	4:13.32	Katarzyna Broniatowska	KS AZS AWF Kraków	4:16.37	Paulina Kaczyńska	WMLKS Pomorze Stargard	4:17.13
5000 metres	Paulina Kaczyńska	WMLKS Pomorze Stargard	16:25.46	Katarzyna Rutkowska	KS Podlasie Białystok	16:26.09	Matylda Kowal	CWKS Resovia Rzeszów	16:29.86
3000 m s'chase	Matylda Kowal	CWKS Resovia Rzeszów	9:53.18	Alicja Konieczek	WMLKS Nadodrze Powodowo	9:53.27	Katarzyna Kowalska	LKS Vectra Włocławek	10:12.10
100 m hurdles	Klaudia Siciarz	KS AZS AWF Kraków	12.74w	Karolina Kołeczek	AZS UMCS Lublin	12.94w	Katarzyna Flis	AZS Łódź	13.57w
400 m hurdles	Joanna Linkiewicz	KS AZS AWF Wrocław	56.21	Justyna Saganiak	UKS 55 Łódź	56.62 PB	Natalia Wosztyl	RLTL ZTE Radom	57.10 PB
5000 m walk	Paulina Buziak	LKS Stal Mielec	22:50.68	Katarzyna Zdziebło	LKS Stal Mielec	23:19.65	Joanna Bemowska	AZS UMCS Lublin	24:41.12
High jump	Michalina Kwaśniewska	AZS-AWF Warszawa	1.84	Paulina Borys	SKLA Sopot	1.84	Martyna Lewandowska	MLKL Płock	1.81
Pole vault	Justyna Śmietanka	AZS-AWF Warszawa	4.50 PB, NL	Paulina Hnida	KS AZS AWF Wrocław	4.00 =PB	Emilia Kusy	SKLA Sopot	4.00
Long jump	Anna Jagaciak-Michalska	OŚ AZS Poznań	6.47	Magdalena Żebrowska	KS Podlasie Białystok	6.33 PB	Angelika Faka	WKS Wawel Kraków	6.28
Triple jump	Anna Jagaciak-Michalska	OŚ AZS Poznań	14.24	Agnieszka Bednarek-Kasza	AZS Łódź	13.14	Adrianna Szóstak	OŚ AZS Poznań	12.99
Shot put	Paulina Guba	AZS UMCS Lublin	18.82	Klaudia Kardasz	KS Podlasie Białystok	17.03	Anna Niedbała	WKS Wawel Kraków	16.42
Discus throw	Lidia Augustyniak	MKL Toruń	55.84	Daria Zabawska	KS Podlasie Białystok	54.89	Monika Nowak	KS AZS AWF Kraków	51.91
Hammer throw	Anita Włodarczyk	RKS Skra Warszawa	79.59	Joanna Fiodorow	OŚ AZS Poznań	74.25	Malwina Kopron	AZS UMCS Lublin	70.88
Javelin throw	Marcelina Witek	AML Słupsk	55.97	Klaudia Maruszewska	LKS Jantar Ustka	52.71	Karolina Bołdysz	AZS-AWFiS Gdańsk	52.58

== Cross country ==
The 90th Polish Cross Country Championships took place on 17 March in Żagań.

=== Men ===
Event	Gold			Silver			Bronze		
Cross country (4 km)	Mateusz Demczyszak	LŁKS Prefbet Śniadowo Łomża	11:31	Patryk Błaszczyk	LKS Jantar Ustka	11:34	Dariusz Boratyński	KS AZS AWF Wrocław	11:35
Cross country (10 km)	Tomasz Grycko	UKS Bliza Władysławowo	29:12	Krystian Zalewski	UKS Barnim Goleniów	29:19	Robert Głowala	GKS Wilga Garwolin	30:14

=== Women ===
Event	Gold			Silver			Bronze		
Cross country (5 km)	Katarzyna Rutkowska	KS Podlasie Białystok	16:25	Katarzyna Broniatowska	KS AZS AWF Kraków	16:44	Aleksandra Brzezińska	MKL Toruń	16:52

== 50 km walk ==
The 1st Polish Championships in women's 50 kilometres race walk took place on 24 March in Dudince, hosted within the annual Dudinská Päťdesiatka race. The men's race wook place on 6 October in Vienna.

Event	Gold			Silver			Bronze
Men	Jakub Jelonek	CKS Budowlani Częstochowa	4:08:28	Grzegorz Grinholc	RKS Rumia	4:54:45	Only two Polish finishers
Women	Agnieszka Ellward	WKS Flota Gdynia	4:32:47 NR	Joanna Bemowska	AZS UMCS Lublin	4:43:48 PB	Only two Polish finishers

== Marathon ==
The 88th Polish Marathon Championships took place on 22 April in Warsaw, hosted within the annual Orlen Warsaw Marathon. The 38th Polish Women's Marathon Championships took place on 8 April as part of the 45th Dębno Marathon.

Event	Gold			Silver			Bronze		
Men	Yared Shegumo	AZS AWF Warszawa	2:13:53	Mariusz Giżyński	WKS Grunwald Poznań	2:15:17	Arkadiusz Gardzielewski	WKS Śląsk Wrocław	2:15:57
Women	Karolina Pilarska	WKB Meta Lubliniec	2:49:06	Karolina Waśniewska	UKS Technik Radom	2:49:34	Arleta Meloch	GKS Olimpia Grudziądz	2:49:51

== 10,000 metres ==
The Polish Championships in the 10,000 metres took place on 28 April in Łomża.

Event	Gold			Silver			Bronze		
Men	Tomasz Grycko	UKS Bliza Władysławowo	28:56.81 PB	Szymon Kulka	LŁKS Prefbet Śniadowo Łomża	29:31.63	Dawid Malina	TL ROW Rybnik	29:41.38
Women	Katarzyna Rutkowska	KS Podlasie Białystok	33:24.08	Paulina Kaczyńska	WMLKS Pomorze Stargard	33:29.05	Olga Kalendarowa-Ochal	LŁKS Prefbet Śniadowo Łomża	34:14.19

== Relay and combined events championships ==
The Polish Relay and Combined Events Championships took place on 1 and 2 June in Suwałki. It was the first time that the Mixed 4 × 400 and 4 × 800 metres relays were held.

=== Men ===
Event	Gold			Silver			Bronze		
4 × 100 m	Artur Zaczek; Krzysztof Grześkowiak; Adrian Wesela; Eryk Hampel	OŚ AZS Poznań	40.03	Jakub Rychlewski; Remigiusz Olszewski; Dariusz Kuć; Dominik Bochenek	SL CWZS Zawisza Bydgoszcz	40.38	Marcin Talacha; Hubert Kalandyk; Michał Jakóbczyk; Dominik Kopeć	KS Agros Zamość	40.98
4 × 400 m	Łukasz Krawczuk; Bartłomiej Chojnowski; Tymoteusz Zimny; Jakub Krzewina	WKS Śląsk Wrocław	3:07.39	Cezary Mirosław; Maciej Hołub; Michał Jabrzyński; Andrzej Jaros	AZS UMCS Lublin	3:09.56	Jakub Smoliński; Piotr Szewczyk; Bartłomiej Czajkowski; Patryk Adamczyk	RLTL ZTE Radom	3:10.48
Decathlon	Paweł Wiesiołek	KS Warszawianka	7921 pts	Rafał Abramowski	AZS-AWF Warszawa	7388 pts PB	Jacek Chochorowski	KS AZS Politechniki Opolskiej	7125 pts PB

=== Women ===
Event	Gold			Silver			Bronze		
4 × 100 m	Julia Rządzińska; Katarzyna Flis; Marta Nawrocka; Karolina Zagajewska	AZS Łódź	45.58	Magdalena Wronka; Nikoletta Misterka; Natalia Węglarz; Adrianna Janowicz	AS-AWF Katowice	45.60	Jagoda Mierzyńska; Karolina Wrzesińska; Marcelina Winkowska; Agata Forkasiewicz	KS AZS-AWF Wrocław	45.76
4 × 400 m	Milena Korbut; Adrianna Janowicz; Natalia Węglarz; Nikoletta Misterka	AS-AWF Katowice	3:37.49	Weronika Bartnowska; Anna Gryc; Marlena Gola; Karolina Łozowska	KS Podlasie Białystok	3:38.00	Emilia Ankiewicz; Angelika Sarna; Agata Kołecka; Dominika Muraszewska	AZS-AWF Warszawa	3:38.91
Heptathlon	Paulina Ligarska	SKLA Sopot	5845 pts	Izabela Mikołajczyk	KS Warszawianka	5556 pts	Wiktoria Zezula	SL CWZS Zawisza Bydgoszcz	5069 pts

=== Mixed relay ===
Event	Gold			Silver			Bronze		
4 × 400 m	Magdalena Broniewicz; Łukasz Ozdarski; Dominika Muraszewska; Dariusz Kowaluk	AZS-AWF Warszawa	3:29.93	Joanna Walas; Patryk Sieradzki; Mateusz Sieradzki; Agata Syrocka	SL CWZS Zawisza Bydgoszcz	3:33.62	Paulina Paluch; Emil Czarnocki; Karolina Grzegorczyk; Jakub Bałdyka	AZS-AWF Warszawa II	3:49.23
4 × 800 m	Daniel Gadomski; Agata Kołecka; Angelika Sarna; Jakub Bałdyka	AZS-AWF Warszawa	8:06.05	Katarzyna Chryczyk; Grzegorz Kunc; Katarzyna Broniatowska; Patryk Marmon	KS AZS AWF Kraków	8:06.56	Andrzej Jankowski; Sylwia Ciołko; Krzysztof Wasilewski; Barbara Skrzypko	KS Podlasie Białystok	8:27.41

== 5K run ==
The 7th Polish 5K Championships took place on 16 June in Warsaw.

Event	Gold			Silver			Bronze		
Men	Yared Shegumo	AZS AWF Warszawa	14:27	Mateusz Demczyszak	LŁKS Prefbet Śniadowo Łomża	14:28	Damian Kabat	WMLKS Pomorze Stargard	14:29
Women	Renata Pliś	MKL Maraton Świnoujście	16:33	Ewa Jagielska	LKS Ostrowianka	16:35	Monika Kaczmarek	ASICS Frontrunner Poland	16:37

== 20 km walk ==
The Polish Championships in the 20 kilometres race walk took place on 23 June in Warsaw.

Event	Gold			Silver			Bronze		
Men	Artur Brzozowski	AZS-AWF Katowice	1:22:19	Dawid Tomala	AZS KU Politechniki Opolskiej Opole	1:22:44	Rafał Sikora	AZS-AWF Katowice	1:22:58
Women	Paulina Buziak	LKS Stal Mielec	1:35:36	Katarzyna Zdziebło	LKS Stal Mielec	1:37:06	Olga Niedziałek	WLKS Nowe Iganie	1:37:08

- Richard Vargas of Venezuela won the race as a guest athlete with a time of 1:22:10

== 10K run ==
The 9th Polish 10K Championships were held on 4 August in Gdańsk as part of the 25th edition of the Saint Dominic Road Race. The 7th Polish Women's 10K Championships took place on 7 October in Warsaw.

Event	Gold			Silver			Bronze		
Men	Marcin Chabowski	STS Pomerania Szczecinek	29:45	Adam Nowicki	MKL Szczecin	29:53	Tomasz Grycko	UKS Bliza Władysławowo	30:12
Women	Renata Pliś	MKL Maraton Świnoujście	33:55	Monika Andrzejczak	MKL Szczecin	34:00	Ewa Jagielska	LKS Ostrowianka	34:11

- Silas Mwetich of Kenya won the race as a guest athlete in a time of 29:28

== Half marathon ==
The 27th Polish Half Marathon Championships took place on 2 September in Piła.

Event	Gold			Silver			Bronze		
Men	Szymon Kulka	LŁKS Prefbet Śniadowo Łomża	1:05:13	Adam Nowicki	MKL Szczecin	1:05:47	Kamil Karbowiak	LZS KL Kotwica Brzeg	1:07:21
Women	Paulina Kaczyńska	WMLKS Pomorze Stargard	1:14:28	Izabela Trzaskalska	AZS UMCS Lublin	1:14:42	Monika Andrzejczak	MKL Szczecin	1:14:48

== 24-hour run ==
The 2019 Polish Championships in 24-hour run were held from 8–9 September near Łyse, Masovian Voivodeship.

Event	Gold			Silver			Bronze		
Men	Leszek Małyszek	AZS-AWF Katowice	237,514 m	Andrzej Mazur	LKS Zantyr Sztum	236,216 m	Przemysław Basa	TL Pogoń Ruda Śląska	227,746 m
Women	Patrycja Bereznowska	AZS-AWF Katowice	232,390 m	Aneta Rajda	TL Pogoń Ruda Śląska	228,399 m	Kamila Wróbel	CWKS Resovia Rzeszów	205,013 m
