= European Masters Indoor Athletics Championships =

The European Masters Indoor Athletics Championships is a biennial international athletics competition for masters athletes aged 35 and over, organised by European Masters Athletics (EMA). Formerly known as the European Veterans Indoor Championships, it was first held in 1997.

== Editions ==
Edition	Year	City	Country	Dates
1	1997	Birmingham	United Kingdom	28 February–2 March
2	1999	Malmö	Sweden	5–7 March
3	2001	Bordeaux	France	8–11 March
4	2003	San Sebastián	Spain	6–9 March
5	2005	Eskilstuna	Sweden	10–13 March
6	2007	Helsinki	Finland	22–25 March
7	2009	Ancona	Italy	25–29 March
8	2011	Ghent	Belgium	16–20 March
9	2013	San Sebastián	Spain	19–24 March
10	2015	Toruń	Poland	23–28 March
11	2016	Ancona	Italy	29 March–3 April
12	2018	Madrid	Spain	19–24 March
13	2022	Braga	Portugal	20–27 February
14	2024	Toruń	Poland	17–23 March
15	2026	Toruń	Poland	27 March–2 April

- 2015 Medal Table : http://www.fidalservizi.it/risultati/Torun2015/MEDALTABLE1.htm
- 2016 Medal Table : http://www.fidalservizi.it/risultati/2016/Ancona_2016/MEDALTABLE1.htm
