= 2022 Polish Athletics Championships =

- Organisers: Ośrodek Sportu i Rekreacji w Suwałkach
- Edition: 98th
- Dates: 9–11 June
- Host city: Suwałki, Poland
- Venue: Athletics stadium
- Level: Senior
- Type: Outdoor
- Official website: https://suwalki2022.pl

The 2022 Polish Athletics Championships was the 98th edition of the national championship in outdoor track and field for athletes in Poland. It was held between 9 and 11 June at the Athletics stadium in Suwałki.

== Schedule ==
On the first day of the competition, around 5 pm, heavy rain began. Immediately after the opening ceremony, a storm and a thunderstorm caused the competition to be paused and then canceled. The competitions have been moved to next days.

Men
Event	9 June	10 June	11 June
100 metres	●	●	
200 metres			●
400 metres		●	
800 metres			●
1500 metres		●	
5000 metres			●
110 metres hurdles			●
400 metres hurdles	●	●	
3000 metres steeplechase		●	
4 × 100 metres relay		●	
4 × 400 metres relay			●
10,000 metres walk		●	
High jump			●
Pole vault		●	
Long jump		●	
Triple jump	●		
Shot put			●
Discus throw		●	
Hammer throw		●	
Javelin throw			●

Women
Event	9 June	10 June	11 June
100 metres	●	●	
200 metres			●
400 metres		●	
800 metres			●
1500 metres		●	
5000 metres			●
100 metres hurdles			●
400 metres hurdles	●	●	
3000 metres steeplechase		●	
4 × 100 metres relay		●	
4 × 400 metres relay			●
5,000 metres walk		●	
High jump		●	
Pole vault		●	
Long jump			●
Triple jump		●	
Shot put	●		
Discus throw		●	
Hammer throw		●	
Javelin throw			●

== Results ==
=== Men ===
Event	Gold		Silver		Bronze	
100 metres	Dominik Kopeć; KS Agros Zamość	10.20 PB	Przemysław Słowikowski; MKL Szczecin	10.34	Patryk Wykrota; KS Stal LA Ostrów Wlkp.	10.34 PB
200 metres	Łukasz Żok; ALKS AJP Gorzów Wlkp.	20.66	Patryk Wykrota; KS Stal LA Ostrów Wlkp.	20.90	Przemysław Kozłowski; KS AZS AWF Katowice	21.24
400 metres	Karol Zalewski; KS AZS UWM Olsztyn	46.44	Kajetan Duszyński; AZS Łódź	46.57	Mateusz Rzeźniczak; RKS Łódź	46.77
800 metres	Patryk Dobek; MKL Szczecin	1:53.50	Mateusz Borkowski; RKS Łódź	1:53.52	Kacper Lewalski; KS AZS UWM Olsztyn	1:54.16
1500 metres	Michał Rozmys; UKS Barnim Goleniów	3:57.97	Andrzej Kowalczyk; Kraków Athletics Team	3:59.06	Patryk Kozłowski; RLTL Optima Radom	3:59.09
5000 metres	Patryk Kozłowski; RLTL Optima Radom	14:20.31	Mateusz Gos; RLTL Optima Radom	14:21.04	Aleksander Wiącek; OKS Start Otwock	14:21.58
110 metres hurdles	Damian Czykier; KS Podlasie Białystok	13.25 NR	Jakub Szymański; SKLA Sopot	13.50	Jakub Bujak; AZS KU Politechniki Opolskiej Opole	13.96
400 metres hurdles	Krzysztof Hołub; AZS UMCS Lublin	50.43 =PB	Sebastian Urbaniak; LKS Vectra Włocławek	50.54	Jakub Olejniczak; TS Wieliczanka Wieliczka	50.86
3000 metres steeplechase	Mikołaj Czeronek; WKS Śląsk Wrocław	8:47.71 PB	Mateusz Kaczmarek; BKS Bydgoszcz	8:48.07 PB	Adam Kołodziej; MUKS Wisła Junior Sandomierz	8:53.20
4 × 100 metres relay	KS Stal LA Ostrów Wlkp. Tomasz Jankowski; Marcin Karolewski; Patryk Wykrota; Kacper Cegła	40.56	AZS UMCS Lublin; Jakub Lempach; Łukasz Żak; Jakub Chmiel; Eryk Hampel	40.60	KS AZS AWF Katowice; Adam Burda; Paweł Dzida; Przemysław Kozłowski; Karol Kwiatkowski	40.68
4 × 400 metres relay	OŚ AZS Poznań; Jan Wawrzkowicz; Mikołaj Buzała; Ryszard Piasecki; Tymoteusz Zimny	3:09.24	KS AZS AWF Katowice; Michał Wróbel; Jacek Majewski; Jakub Pająk; Adam Paździerz	3:10.14	AZS UMCS Lublin; Krzysztof Hołub; Cezary Mirosław; Oskar Gołębiowski; Maciej Hołub	3:10.49
10,000 metres walk	Artur Brzozowski; KKL Stal Stalowa Wola	43:08.10	Jakub Jelonek; CKS Budowlani Częstochowa	43:44.89	Rafał Sikora; KS AZS AWF Kraków	46:13.69
High jump	Mateusz Kołodziejski; CWZS Zawisza Bydgoszcz SL	2.21	Mikołaj Szczęsny; MKLA Łęczyca	2.12	Sebastian Moszczyński; KS Podlasie Białystok	2.12
Pole vault	Piotr Lisek; OSOT Szczecin	5.65	Robert Sobera; KS AZS AWF Wrocław	5.60	Karol Pawlik; CWZS Zawisza Bydgoszcz SL	5.40
Long jump	Piotr Tarkowski; KS AZS-AWF Biała Podlaska	8.03 PB	Mateusz Jopek; KS AZS AWF Wrocław	7.77	Andrzej Kuch; AZS UMCS Lublin	7.52
Triple jump	Adrian Świderski; WKS Śląsk Wrocław	16.35	Rafał Sulwirski; KS AZS AWF Warszawa	15.57 PB	Jan Kulmaczewski; KS AZS AWF Warszawa	15.56
Shot put	Michał Haratyk; KS Sprint Bielsko-Biała	21.17	Konrad Bukowiecki; KS AZS UWM Olsztyn	20.30	Jakub Szyszkowski; KS AZS AWF Katowice	19.89
Discus throw	Oskar Stachnik; AZS UMCS Lublin	64.06 PB	Robert Urbanek; MKS Aleksandrów Łódzki	61.13	Jakub Lewoszewski; KS Agros Zamość	59.63 PB
Hammer throw	Wojciech Nowicki; KS Podlasie Białystok	80.90	Paweł Fajdek; KS AZS AWF Katowice	77.13	Marcin Wrotyński; OŚ AZS Poznań	73.77
Javelin throw	Marcin Krukowski; KS Warszawianka W-wa	80.44	Eryk Kołodziejczak; LUKS Start Nakło	78.22 PB	Piotr Lebioda; LUKS Hańcza Suwałki	78.01

=== Women ===
Event	Gold		Silver		Bronze	
100 metres	Ewa Swoboda; KS AZS AWF Katowice	10.99	Magdalena Stefanowicz; KS AZS AWF Katowice	11.21	Martyna Kotwiła; RLTL Optima Radom	11.28
200 metres	Martyna Kotwiła; RLTL Optima Radom	22.94	Nikola Horowska; ALKS AJP Gorzów Wlkp.	22.99	Marika Popowicz-Drapała; CWZS Zawisza Bydgoszcz SL	22.99
400 metres	Natalia Kaczmarek; KS AZS AWF Wrocław	51.25	Anna Kiełbasińska; SKLA Sopot	51.58	Justyna Święty-Ersetic; KS AZS AWF Katowice	51.70
800 metres	Anna Wielgosz; CWKS Resovia Rzeszów	2:03.08	Margarita Koczanowa; KS AZS AWF Kraków	2:04.03	Adrianna Czapla; AZS UMCS Lublin	2:04.10
1500 metres	Sofia Ennaoui; AZS UMCS Lublin	4:30.22	Eliza Megger; LKS Pszczyna	4:30.98	Aleksandra Płocińska; SRS Kondycja Piaseczno	4:31.25
5000 metres	Angelika Mach; AZS UMCS Lublin	15:57.99 PB	Beata Topka; ULKS Talex Borzytuchom	15:59.58	Renata Pliś; MKL Maraton Świnoujście	16:05.21
100 metres hurdles	Pia Skrzyszowska; KS AZS AWF Warszawa	12.62 PB	Klaudia Siciarz; KS AZS AWF Kraków	12.90	Klaudia Wojtunik; AZS Łódź	13.05
400 metres hurdles	Izabela Smolińska; RLTL Optima Radom	57.16 PB	Julia Korzuch; KS AZS AWF Katowice	58.23	Aleksandra Wołczak; AZS-AWF Gorzów	58.70
3000 metres steeplechase	Kinga Królik; UKS Azymut Pabianice	9:47.84	Patrycja Kapała; KS AZS AWF Katowice	9:48.49 PB	Alicja Konieczek; OŚ AZS Poznań	9:49.10
4 × 100 metres relay	CWZS Zawisza Bydgoszcz SL; Katarzyna Ferenz; Klaudia Adamek; Katarzyna Sokólska; Marika Popowicz-Drapała	45.10	RLTL Optima Radom; Martyna Osińska; Natalia Wosztyl; Izabela Smolińska; Martyna Kotwiła	45.85	KS AZS AWF Kraków; Anna Kulpińska; Weronika Nagięć; Monika Kiepura; Alicja Struzik	45.87
4 × 400 metres relay	AZS UMCS Lublin; Alicja Wrona; Wiktoria Drozd; Adrianna Janowicz-Półtorak; Małgorzata Hołub-Kowalik	3:34.73	KS AZS AWF Warszawa; Weronika Bartnowska; Karolina Łozowska; Anna Maria Gryc; Dominika Baćmaga	3:35.64	KS AZS AWF Kraków; Katarzyna Martyna; Aleksandra Wsołek; Margarita Koczanowa; Aleksandra Gaworska	3:40.21
5,000 metres walk	Katarzyna Zdziebło; LKS Stal Mielec	21:29.23	Olga Niedziałek; WLKS Nowe Iganie	22:21.92 PB	Anna Zdziebło; LKS Stal Mielec	25:16.02
High jump	Wiktoria Miąso; CWKS Resovia Rzeszów	1.86	Aneta Rydz; RLTL Optima Radom	1.79	Paulina Wal; AZS KU Politechniki Opolskiej Opole	1.76
Pole vault	Agnieszka Kaszuba; KL Gdynia	4.10	Maja Chamot; KS Sprint Bielsko-Biała	4.00	Emilia Kusy; SKLA Sopot	4.00
Long jump	Roksana Jędraszak; OŚ AZS Poznań	6.42 PB	Anna Matuszewicz; MKL Toruń	6.40	Anna Rugowska; WLKS Wrocław	6.25 PB
Triple jump	Adrianna Szóstak; OŚ AZS Poznań	13.84	Agnieszka Bednarek; AZS Łódź	13.64 PB	Karolina Młodawska; KKL Kielce	13.61
Shot put	Klaudia Kardasz; KS Podlasie Białystok	17.65	Paulina Guba; AZS UMCS Lublin	17.40	Zuzanna Maślana; MLKL Płock	14.85
Discus throw	Daria Zabawska; AZS UMCS Lublin	58.74	Karolina Urban; AZS-AWFiS Gdańsk	56.38	Karolina Sygutowska; ZLKL Zielona Góra	51.73
Hammer throw	Malwina Kopron; KS Wisła Puławy	69.60	Ewa Różańska; KS AZS AWF Warszawa	69.24	Katarzyna Furmanek; KKL Kielce	68.69
Javelin throw	Maria Andrejczyk; LUKS Hańcza Suwałki	57.53	Karolina Bołdysz; AZS-AWFiS Gdańsk	55.23	Klaudia Regin; LKS Jantar Ustka	53.78
