= Adam Nowicki =

Polish long-distance runner

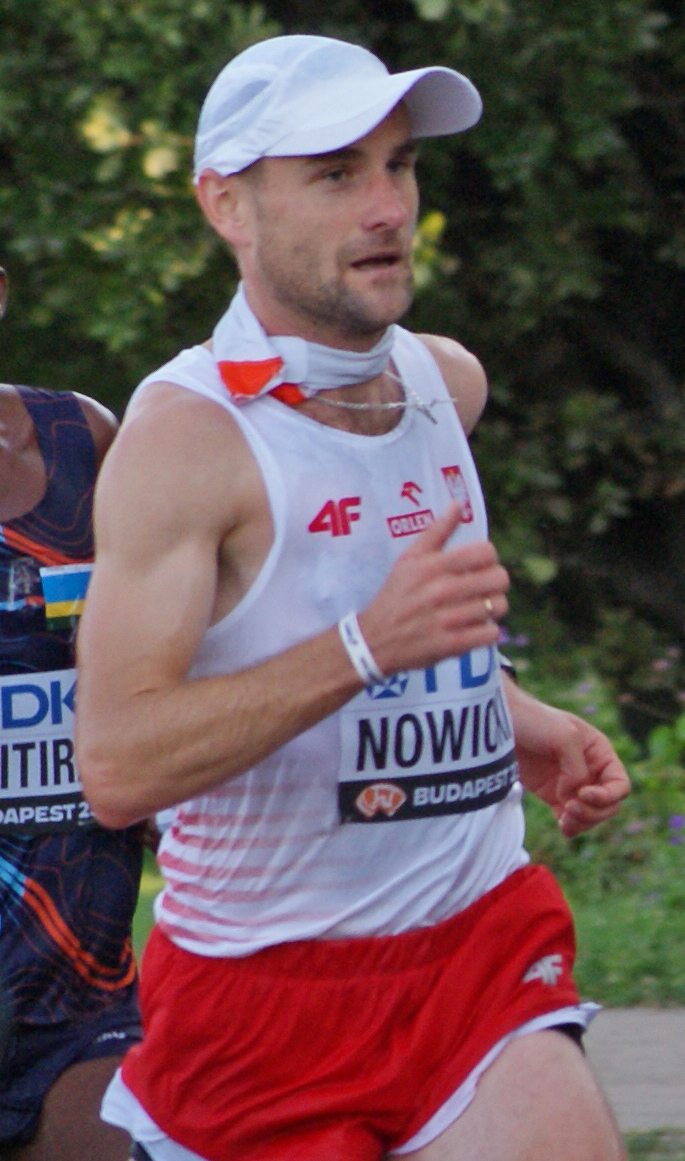

Personal information
- Born: 24 August 1990 (age 35)

Sport
- Country: Poland
- Sport: Athletics
- Event: Long-distance running

Adam Nowicki (born 24 August 1990) is a Polish long-distance runner. In 2020, he competed in the men's race at the 2020 World Athletics Half Marathon Championships held in Gdynia, Poland.
