= Polish Indoor Athletics Championships =

Annual track and field competition

- Sport: Indoor track and field
- Founded: 1933 (1973)
- Country: Poland

The Polish Indoor Athletics Championships (Polish: Halowe mistrzostwa Polski seniorów w lekkoatletyce) is an annual indoor track and field competition organised by the Polish Athletic Association, which serves as the national championship for the sport in Poland. Typically held over two to three days in February during the Dutch winter, it was first added to the national calendar in 1933, supplementing the main outdoor Polish Athletics Championships held in the summer since 1920. The national indoor competition was held from 1933 to 1956 (with a break during World War II from 1939 to 1945). After a near twenty-year gap, the championships was restored to its annual fixture in 1973.

== Events ==
The following athletics events feature as standard on the Polish Indoor Championships programme:

- Sprint: 60 m, 200 m, 400 m
- Distance track events: 800 m, 1500 m, 3000 m
- Hurdles: 60 m hurdles
- Jumps: long jump, triple jump, high jump, pole vault
- Throws: shot put
- Combined events: heptathlon (men), pentathlon (women)
- Racewalking: 5000 m walk (men), 3000 m walk (women)

The 200 metres was introduced in 1982. Combined events were added in 1974 – for men this was first held as a sextathlon, then as a heptathlon thereafter. The heptathlon was replaced by an octathlon between 1987 and 1989. A men's walk race over 10,000 m was held from 1981 to 1986, before being reduced to the standard 5000 m distance. Similarly, women competed in the 5000 m walk from 1983 to 1986 until being replaced by the standard 3000 m distance. The women's 3000 metres run became an annual fixture in 2000. The addition of women's triple jump (1991) and pole vault (1998) brought parity in the number of events for the sexes.

== Editions ==
Year	Dates	City	Venue	Notes
1933	5 February	Przemyśl	Okręgowy Ośrodek WF	
1934	2 February	Przemyśl	Okręgowy Ośrodek WF	
1935	2–3 February	Przemyśl	Okręgowy Ośrodek WF	
1936	22–23 February	Przemyśl	Okręgowy Ośrodek WF	
1937	1–2 February	Przemyśl	Okręgowy Ośrodek WF	
1938	5–6 February	Poznań	Towarzystwo Gimnastyczne „Sokół”	
1939	11–12 February	Przemyśl	Okręgowy Ośrodek WF	
Not held due to World War II
1946	2–3 March	Olsztyn	Wojewódzki Urząd WF i PW	
1947	8–9 February	Olsztyn	Wojewódzki Urząd WF i PW	
1948	28–29 February	Olsztyn	Wojewódzki Urząd WF i PW	
1949	19–20 February	Poznań	Wojewódzki Ośrodek Szkolenia Sportowego	
1950	18–19 February	Przemyśl	WKKF	
1951	17–18 February	Poznań	Wojewódzki Ośrodek Szkolenia Sportowego	
Not held in 1952 or 1953
1954	6–7 February	Poznań	Wojewódzki Ośrodek Szkolenia Sportowego	Men's competition
1954	6–7 February	Przemyśl	WKKF	Women's competition
1955	26–27 February	Warsaw	hala AWF	
1956	21–22 January	Warsaw	hala AWF	
1973	24–25 February	Warsaw	hala AWF	
1973	24–25 February	Zabrze	hala Górnik Zabrze	60 metres and 60 metres hurdles
1974	23–24 February	Katowice	Spodek	
1975	22–23 February	Katowice	hala Spodek	
1975	1–2 March	Warsaw	hala AWF	Combined events
1976	7–8 February	Warsaw	hala AWF	
1976	21–22 February	Warsaw	hala AWF	Combined events
1977	26–27 February	Zabrze	hala Górnika Zabrze	
1978	25–26 February	Zabrze	hala Górnika Zabrze	
1979	7–8 February	Zabrze	hala Górnika Zabrze	
1980	16–17 February	Zabrze	hala Górnika Zabrze	
1980	23–24 February	Zabrze	hala Górnika Zabrze	Combined events
1981	7–8 February	Zabrze	hala Górnika Zabrze	
1982	20–21 February	Zabrze	hala Górnika Zabrze	
1982	18 February	Warsaw	hala AWF	Pole vault
1982	27–28 February	Warsaw	hala AWF	Combined events
1983	19–20 February	Zabrze	hala Górnika Zabrze	
1983	19–20 February	Warsaw	hala AWF	Pole vault, Combined events
1984	18–19 February	Zabrze	hala Górnika Zabrze	
1984	25–26 February	Warsaw	hala AWF	Combined events
1985	16–17 February	Zabrze	hala Górnika Zabrze	
1985	10–11 February	Zabrze	hala Górnika Zabrze	Combined events
1986	8–9 February	Zabrze	hala Górnika Zabrze	
1986	8–9 February 1986	Warsaw	hala AWF	Combined events
1987	7–8 February	Zabrze	hala Górnika Zabrze	
1987	31 January – 1 February	Warsaw	hala AWF	Combined events
1988	20–21 February 1988	Zabrze	hala Górnika Zabrze	
1989	4–5 February	Zabrze	hala Górnika Zabrze	
1990	17–18 February	Spała	Hala OPO w Spale	
1991	23–24 February	Spała	Hala OPO w Spale	
1992	15–16 February	Spała	Hala OPO w Spale	
1993	20–21 February	Spała	Hala OPO w Spale	
1994	26–27 February	Spała	Hala OPO w Spale	
1995	25–26 February	Spała	Hala OPO w Spale	
1995	19–20 February	Spała	Hala OPO w Spale	Combined events
1996	24–25 February	Spała	Hala OPO w Spale	
1997	22–23 February	Spała	Hala OPO w Spale	
1998	14–15 February	Spała	Hala OPO w Spale	
1998	7–8 February	Spała	Hala OPO w Spale	Combined events
1999	21–22 February	Spała	Hala OPO w Spale	
1999	6–7 February	Spała	Hala OPO w Spale	Combined events
2000	12–13 February	Spała	Hala OPO w Spale	
2000	5–6 February	Spała	Hala OPO w Spale	Combined events
2001	24–25 February	Spała	Hala OPO w Spale	
2002	16–17 February	Spała	Hala OPO w Spale	
2003	1–2 March	Spała	Hala OPO w Spale	
2004	21–22 February	Spała	Hala OPO w Spale	
2005	19–20 February	Spała	Hala OPO w Spale	
2006	25–26 February	Spała	Hala OPO w Spale	
2007	17–18 February	Spała	Hala OPO w Spale	
2007	3–4 February	Spała	Hala OPO w Spale	Combined events
2008	23–24 February	Spała	Hala OPO w Spale	
2008	16–17 February	Spała	Hala OPO w Spale	Combined events
2009	21–22 February	Spała	Hala OPO w Spale	
2009	7–8 February	Spała	Hala OPO w Spale	Combined events
2010	27–28 February	Spała	Hala OPO w Spale	
2011	19–20 February	Spała	Hala OPO w Spale	
2012	25–26 February	Spała	Hala OPO w Spale	
2013	16–17 February	Spała	Hala OPO w Spale	
2014	22–23 February	Sopot	Ergo Arena	
2015	21–22 February	Toruń	Arena Toruń	
2015	31 January – 1 February	Spała	Hala OPO w Spale	Combined events
2016	5–6 March	Toruń	Arena Toruń	
2017	18–19 February	Toruń	Arena Toruń	
2018	17–18 February	Toruń	Arena Toruń	
2019	16–17 February	Toruń	Arena Toruń	
2020
2021	20–21 February	Toruń	Arena Toruń	
2022	5–6 March	Toruń	Arena Toruń	

== Championships records ==
=== Men ===
Event	Record	Athlete/Team	Date	Championships	Place	Ref.
400 m						
Pole vault						

=== Women ===
Event	Record	Athlete/Team	Date	Championships	Place	Ref.
60 m	6.99 NR	Ewa Swoboda	5 March 2022	2022 Championships	Toruń	
400 m	50.83 NR	Natalia Kaczmarek	19 February 2023	2023 Championships	Toruń	
Pentathlon	4860 pts NR	Adrianna Sułek	18 March 2023	2023 Championships	Toruń	
Pentathlon	60m H / High jump / Shot put / Long jump / 800m; 8.33 / 1.89 m / 13.06 m / 6.56 m / 2:10.70					
