= Urszula Bhebhe =

Polish hurdler (born 1992)

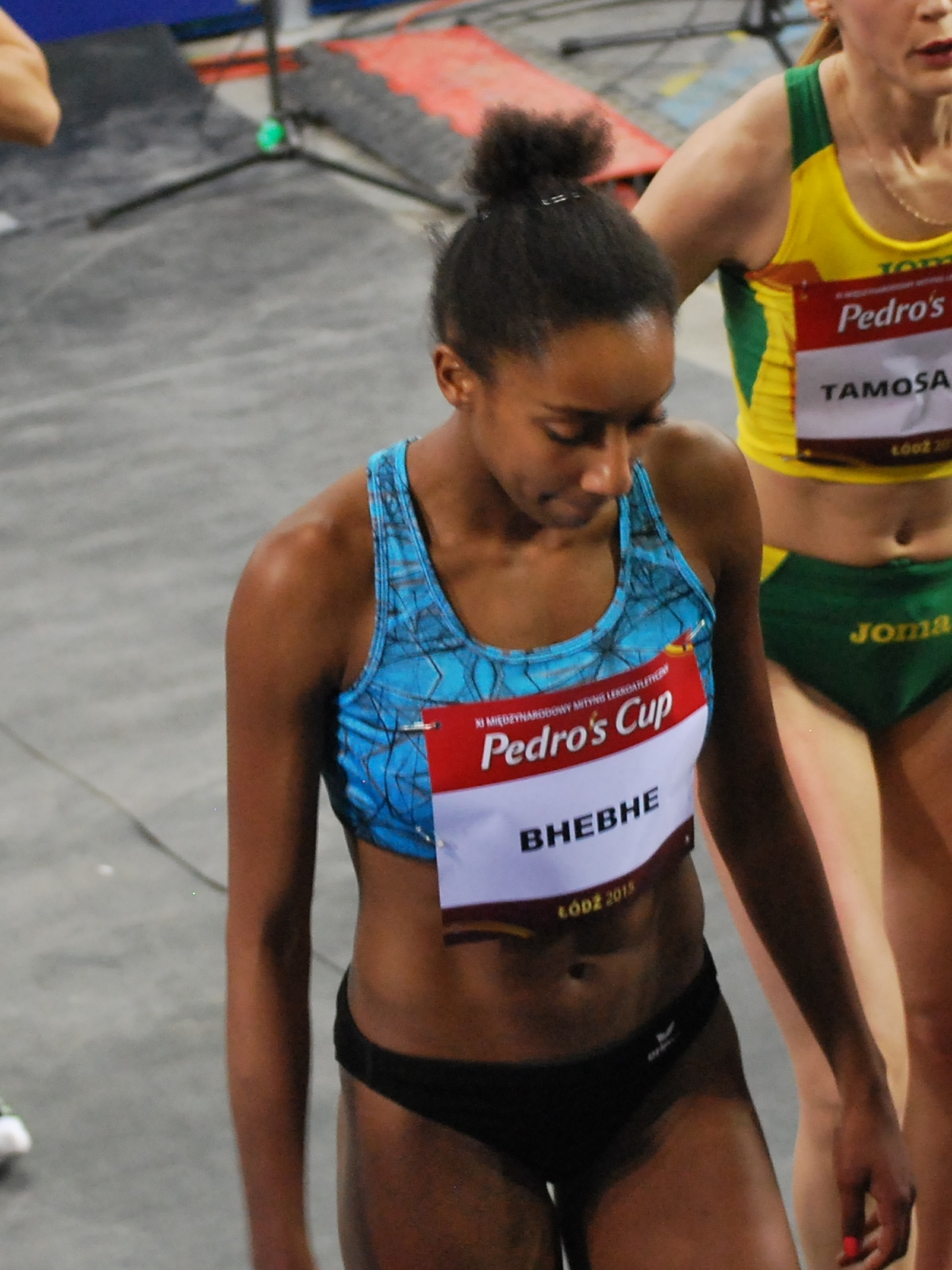
- Urszula Bhebhe in 2015

Personal information
- Born: 1 January 1992 (age 33)

Sport
- Country: Poland
- Sport: Track and field
- Event: Hurdles

Urszula Bhebhe (born 1 January 1992) is a Polish hurdler. She competed in the 60 metres hurdles event at the 2014 IAAF World Indoor Championships.

Her athletic career began with sprinting, but she later specialized in racing. After winning multiple medals in national championships in junior categories, in 2011, she unexpectedly became national champion setting a personal record result of 8.43 in the course of the 60 meter hurdles. In 2012, she won the gold in the Polish national championship establishing a personal record in the 100 meter hurdles - 13.34.
