= Kujawsko-Pomorska Arena Toruń =

Indoor arena in Toruń, Poland

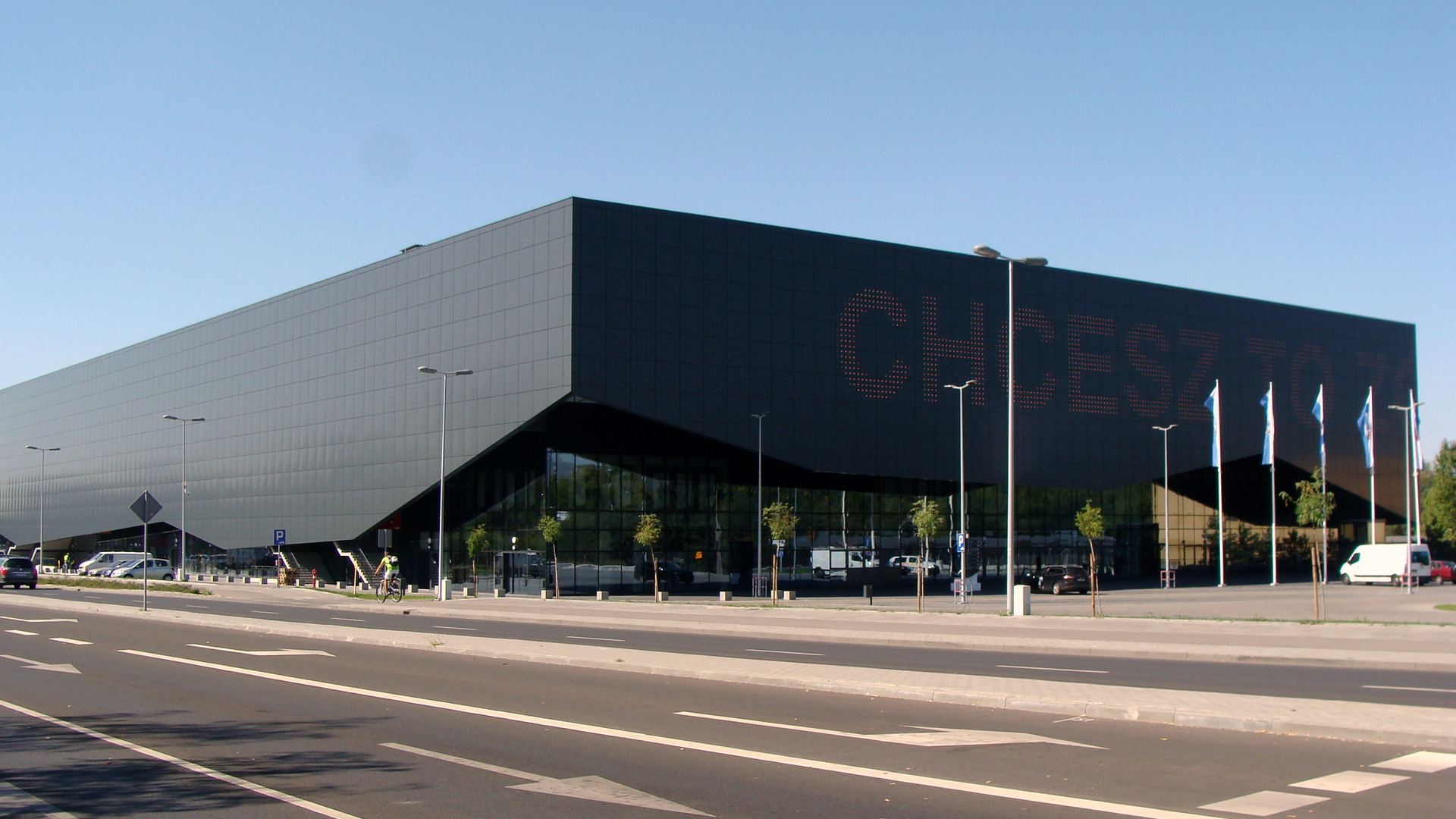
- Arena Toruń in 2014
- Interactive map of Kujawsko-Pomorska Arena Toruń
- Former names: Arena Toruń (2014–2025)
- Address: ul. gen. Józefa Bema 73-89
- Location: Toruń, Poland
- Coordinates: 53.0177°N 18.5883°E
- Owner: Municipality of Toruń
- Capacity: 6,248 (all-seated); 9,250 (with standing)

Construction
- Built: 2011–2014
- Opened: 10 August 2014
- Cost: 158 million zł (€40 million)
- Architects: Dedeco; MD Polska

Tenants
- Twarde Pierniki Toruń (men's basketball); Katarzynki Toruń (women's basketball); Budowlani Toruń (women's volleyball)

Website
- https://arenatorun.pl/

Kujawsko-Pomorska Arena Toruń is a multi-purpose indoor arena in Toruń, Poland. Opened in 2014, the main arena has 6,248 permanent seats and a capacity of up to 9,250 for concerts with standing places. It is the home venue of Twarde Pierniki Toruń of the Polish Basketball League.

In addition to the main arena, the complex contains a smaller side venue and other sports facilities, including a training hall, climbing wall, martial arts room, gym and table tennis room, as well as changing rooms and medical facilities.

== History ==
The arena was designed by a consortium of Dedeco and MD Polska, with the project presented in 2010 and construction beginning in 2011. Located in Chełmińskie Przedmieście in the western part of Toruń, it cost 158 million zł (approximately €40 million) and measures 162.25 metres in length, 97.10 metres in width and 20 metres in height. The venue was officially opened on 10 August 2014.

Since 1 July 2025, it has been officially known as Kujawsko-Pomorska Arena Toruń following an agreement between the Kuyavian–Pomeranian Voivodeship and the municipality of Toruń.

=== Events ===
Among the events held at the arena were the 2021 European Athletics Indoor Championships, the 2023 World Masters Athletics Indoor Championships, the 2024 European Masters Indoor Athletics Championships and the 2026 World Athletics Indoor Championships. Since 2015, it has been the permanent host of the Copernicus Cup.

== Gallery ==
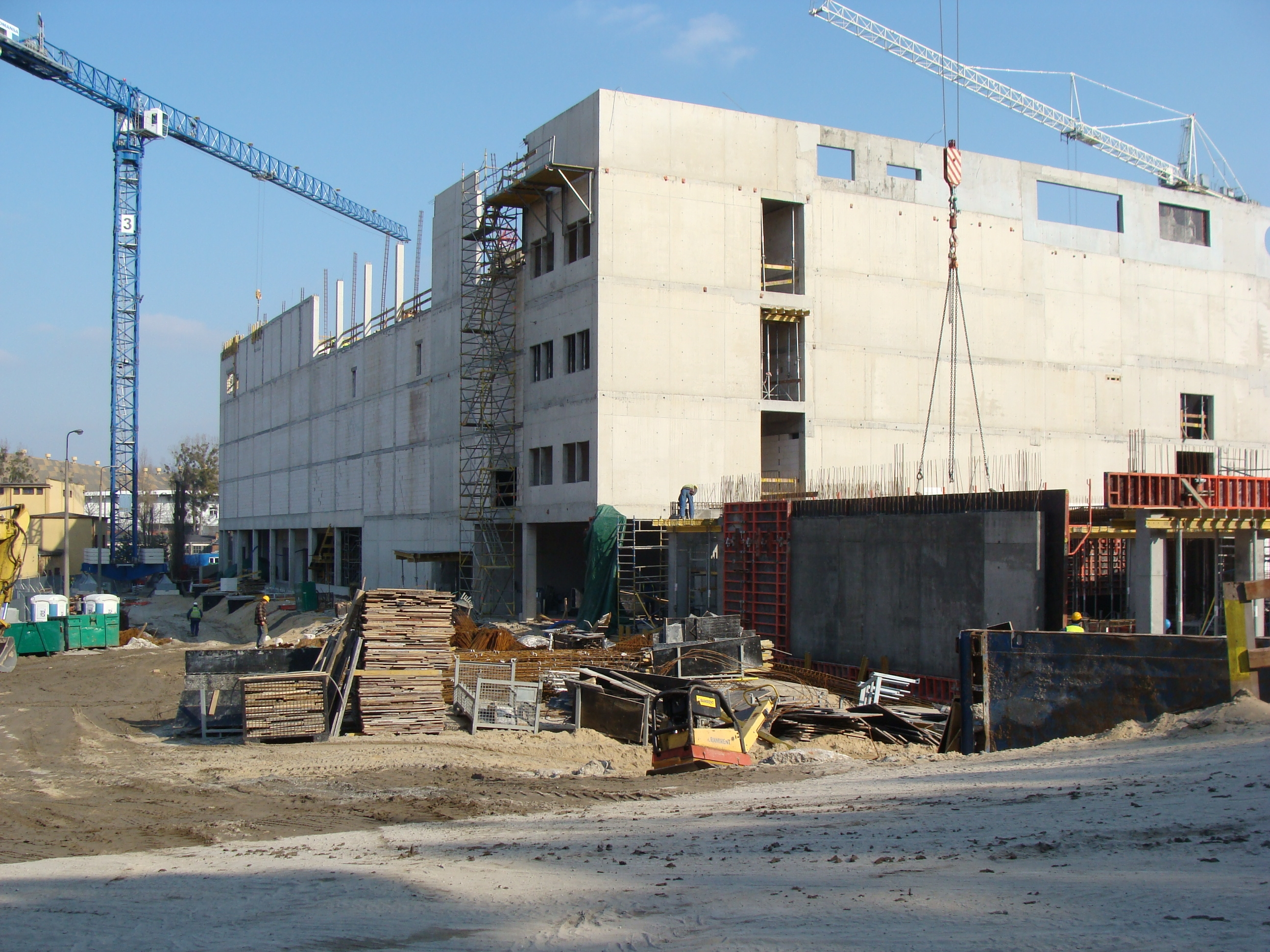
The arena under construction

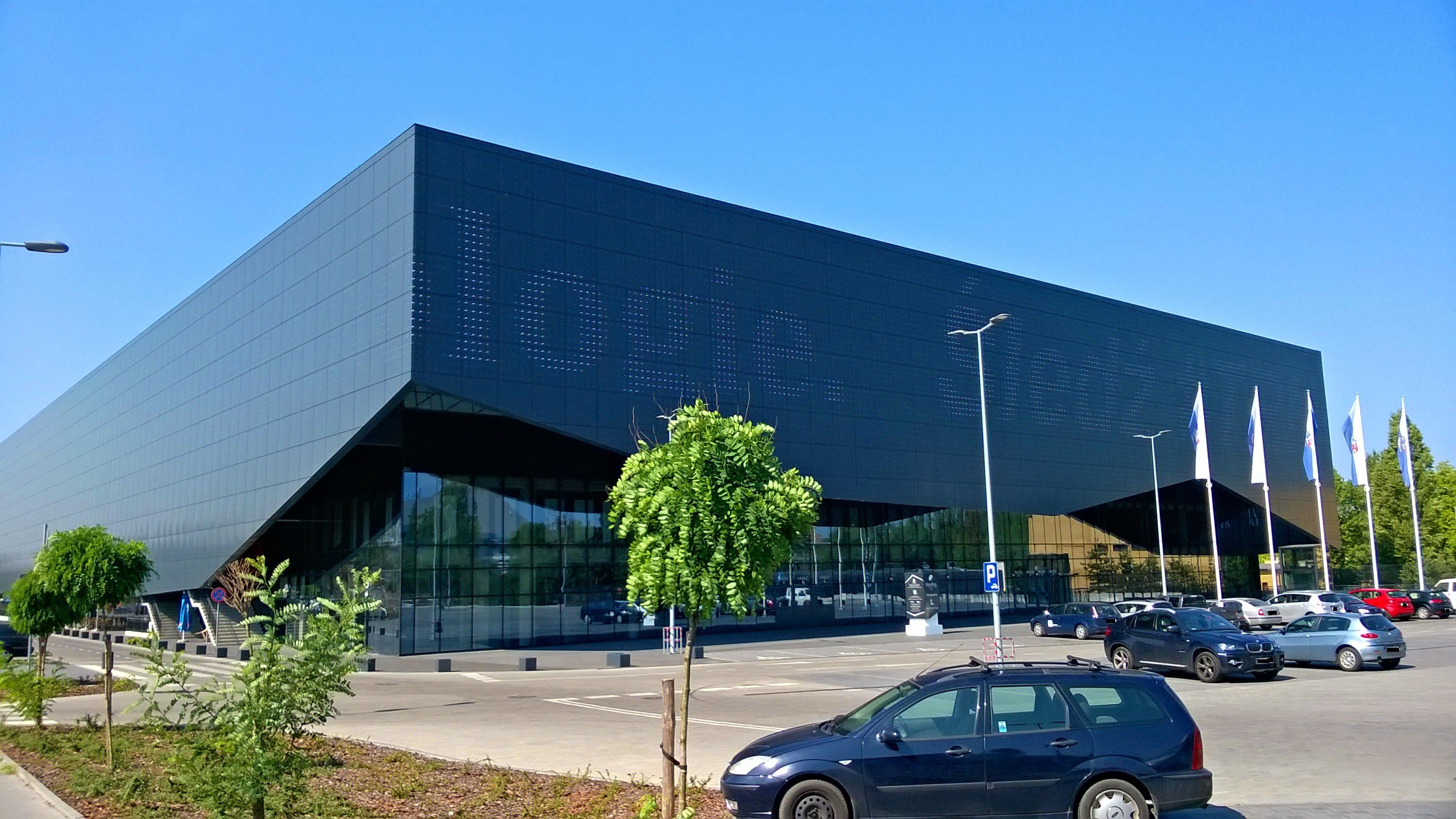
North view

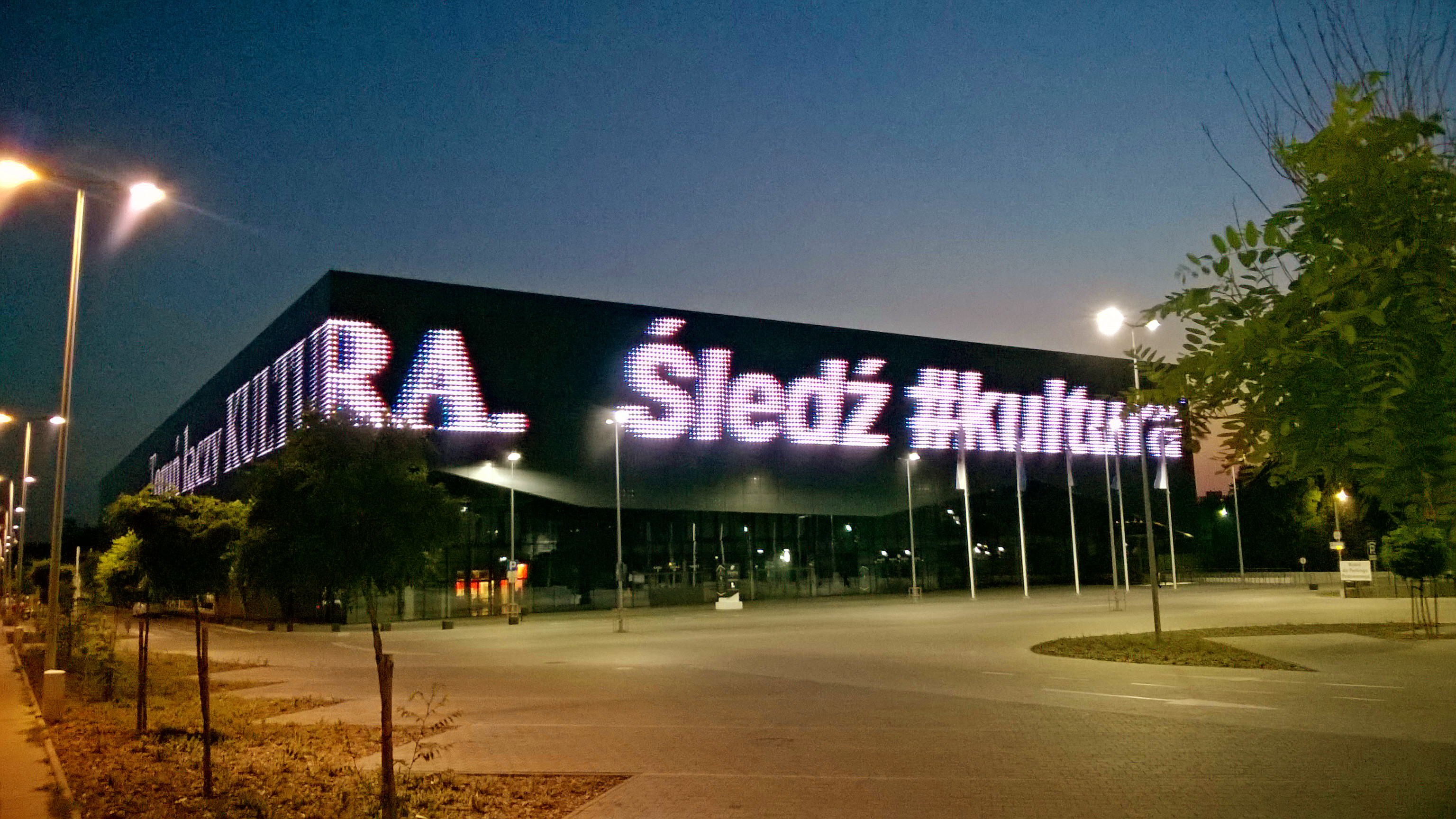
Night view

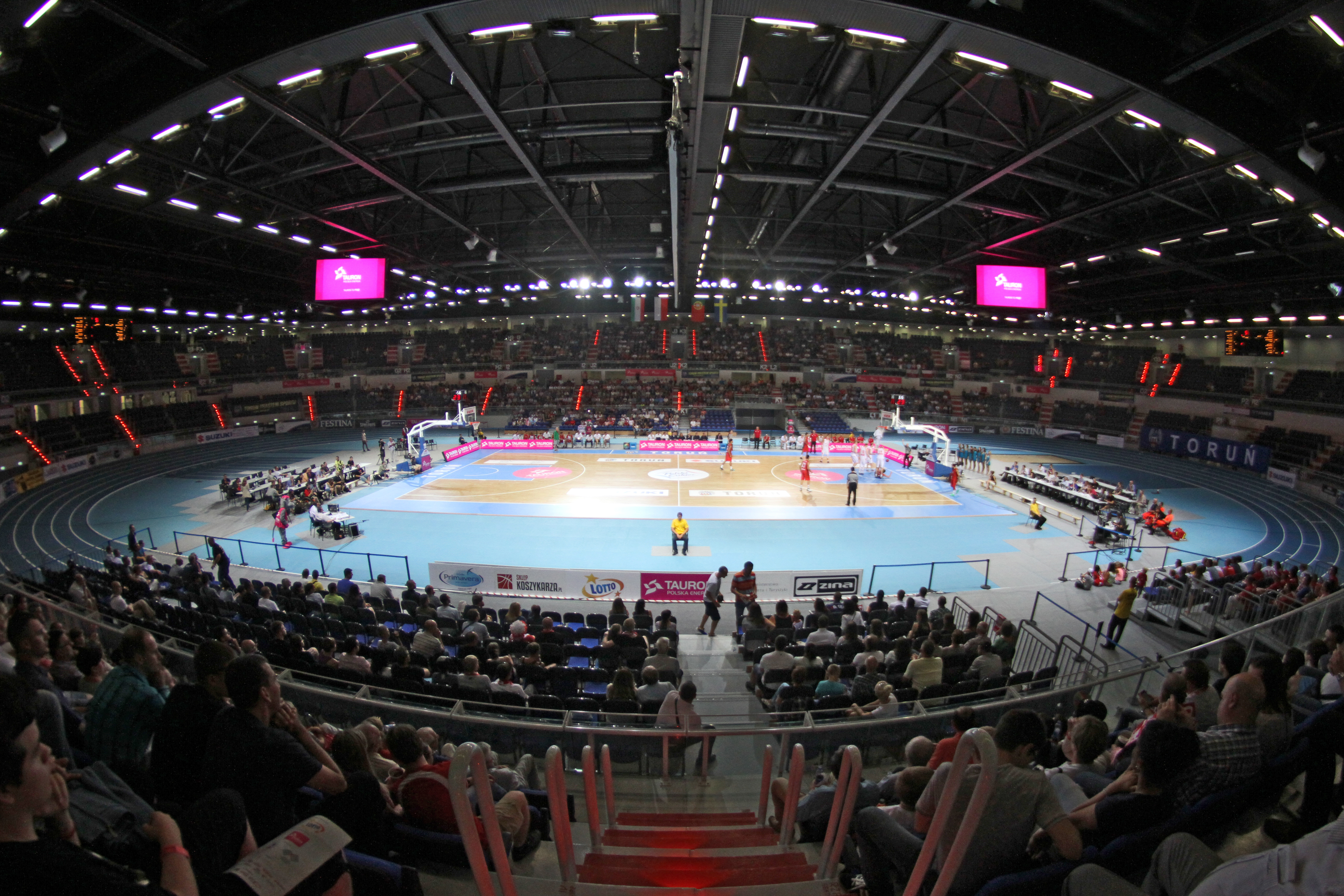
Interior

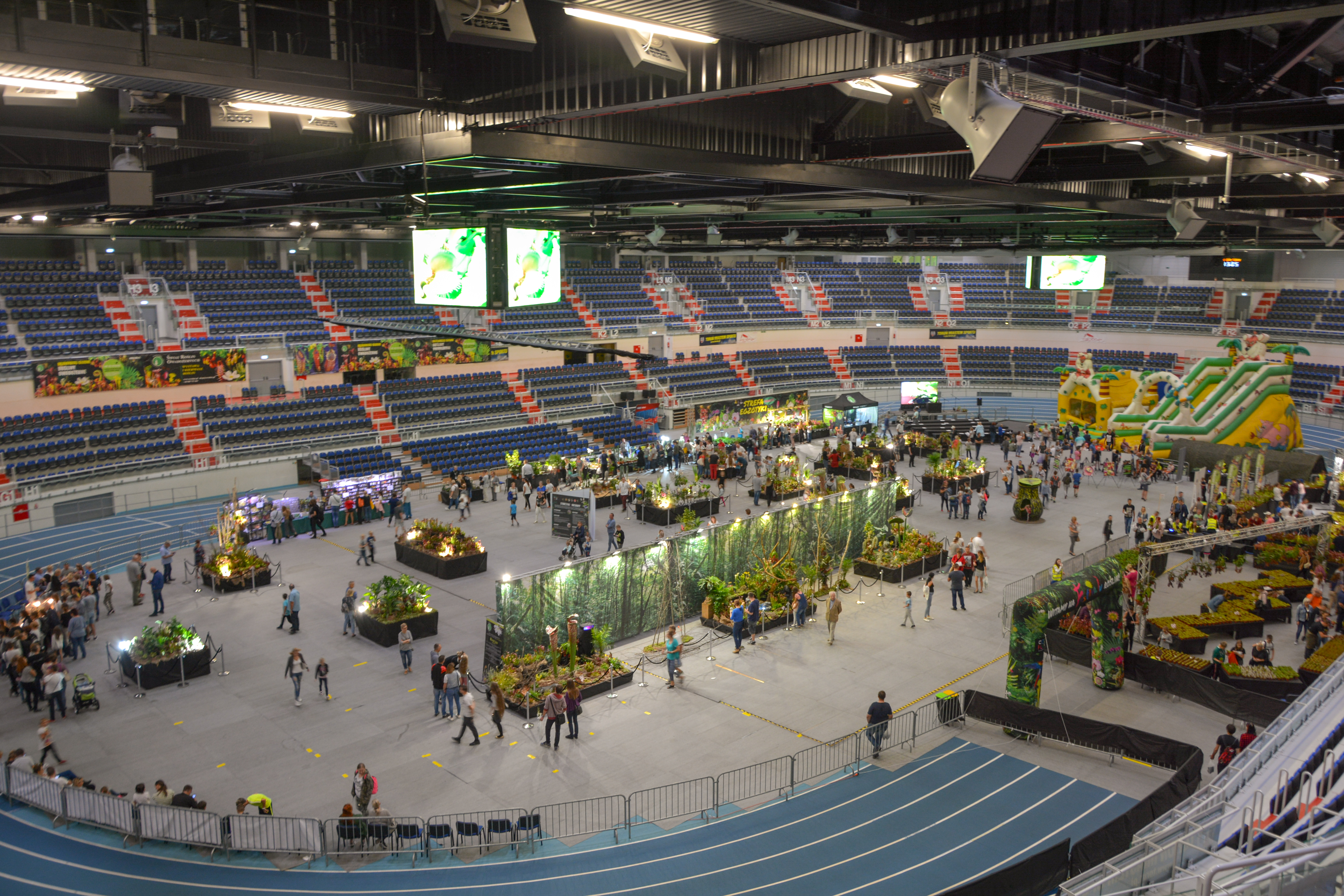
A horticultural exhibition in 2018

== See also ==
- List of indoor arenas in Poland
- Sport in Poland

Preceded by Commonwealth Arena; Glasgow	European Athletics Indoor Championships; Venue; 2021	Succeeded by Ataköy Athletics Arena; Istanbul
Preceded by Nanjing's Cube; Nanjing	World Athletics Indoor Championships; Venue; 2026	Succeeded by TBA
