= Łukasz Niedziałek =

Polish racewalker

Personal information
- Nationality: Polish
- Born: 15 March 2000 (age 26)

Sport
- Sport: Athletics
- Event: Racewalking

Łukasz Niedziałek (born 15 March 2000) is a Polish racewalking athlete. He qualified to represent Poland at the 2020 Summer Olympics in Tokyo 2021, competing in men's 20 kilometres walk.
