= 2021 Polish Athletics Championships =

- Organisers: Poznańskie Ośrodki Sportu i Rekreacji
- Edition: 97th
- Dates: 24–26 June
- Host city: Poznań, Poland
- Venue: Stadion Olimpii
- Level: Senior
- Type: Outdoor
- Official website: https://poznan2021.pl/

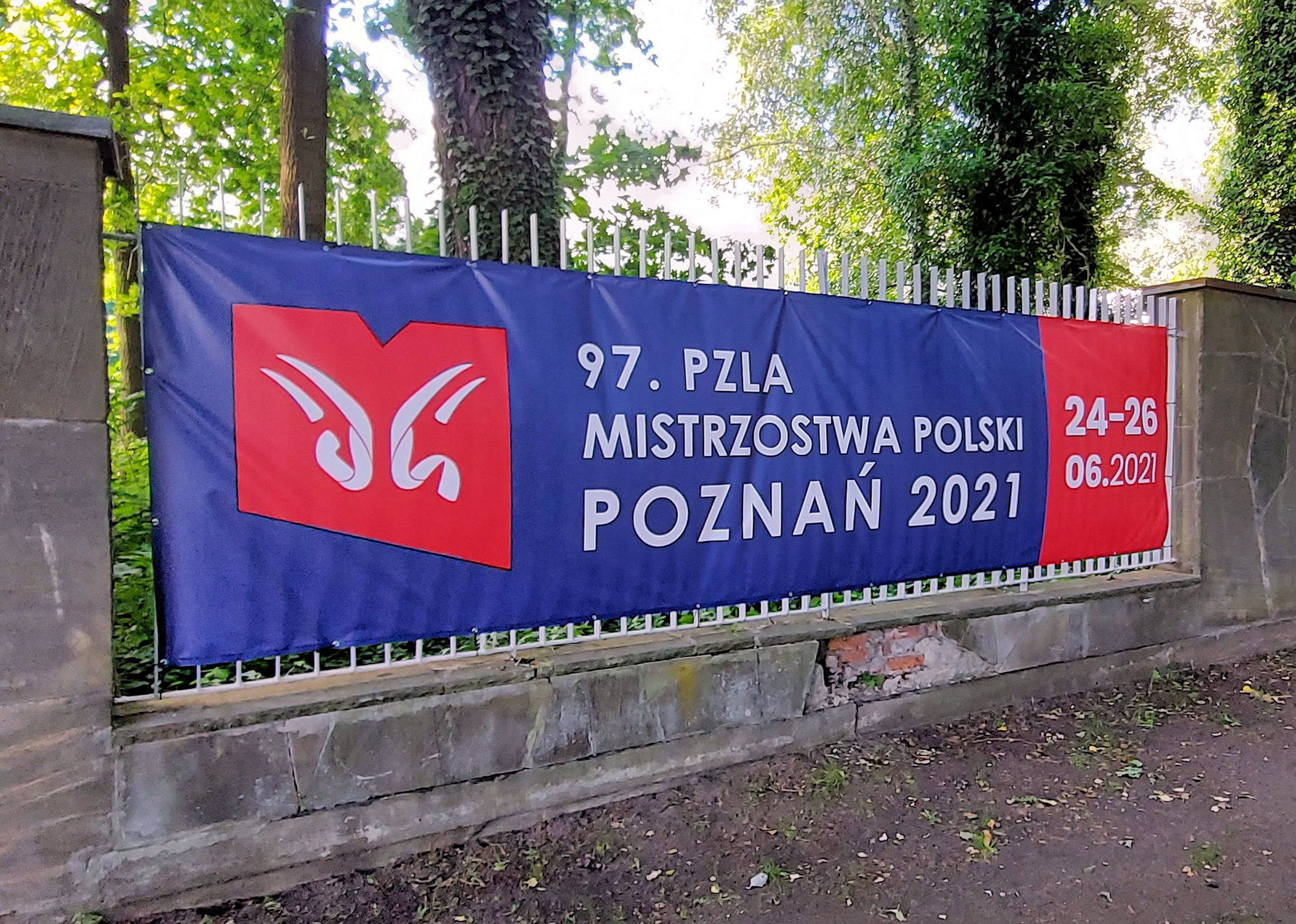

The 2021 Polish Athletics Championships was the 97th edition of the national championship in outdoor track and field for athletes in Poland. It was held between 24 and 26 June at the Stadion Olimpii in Poznań.

== Schedule ==
Men
Event	24 June	25 June	26 June
100 metres	●		
200 metres		●	●
400 metres		●	
800 metres		●	●
1500 metres	●		
5000 metres			●
110 metres hurdles			●
400 metres hurdles	●	●	
3000 metres steeplechase	●		
4 × 100 metres relay		●	
4 × 400 metres relay			●
10,000 metres walk		●	
High jump		●	
Pole vault		●	
Long jump			●
Triple jump	●		
Shot put	●		
Discus throw		●	
Hammer throw		●	
Javelin throw	●		

Women
Event	24 June	25 June	26 June
100 metres	●		
200 metres		●	●
400 metres	●	●	
800 metres		●	●
1500 metres	●		
5000 metres			●
100 metres hurdles			●
400 metres hurdles	●	●	
3000 metres steeplechase	●		
4 × 100 metres relay		●	
4 × 400 metres relay			●
5,000 metres walk		●	
High jump		●	
Pole vault			●
Long jump			●
Triple jump	●		
Shot put	●		
Discus throw		●	
Hammer throw			●
Javelin throw	●		

== Results ==
=== Men ===
Event	Gold		Silver		Bronze	
100 metres	Dominik Kopeć; KS Agros Zamość	10.31	Przemysław Słowikowski; AZS-AWF Katowice	10.32	Mateusz Siuda; OŚ AZS Poznań	10.39
200 metres	Adrian Brzeziński; MKL Toruń	20.99	Oliwer Wdowik; CWKS Resovia Rzeszów	21.05	Łukasz Żok; ALKS AJP Gorzów Wlkp.	21.07
400 metres	Kajetan Duszyński; AZS Łódź	45.96	Mateusz Rzeźniczak; RKS Łódź	46.10 PB	Karol Zalewski; AZS-AWF Katowice	46.12
800 metres	Patryk Dobek; MKL Szczecin	1:48.21	Mateusz Borkowski; RKS Łódź	1:49.10	Patryk Sieradzki; CWZS Zawisza Bydgoszcz SL	1:49.43
1500 metres	Marcin Lewandowski; AZS UMCS Lublin	3:49.49	Michał Rozmys; UKS Barnim Goleniów	3:49.60	Andrzej Kowalczyk; ULKS Fajfer 2001 Łapanów	3:50.96
5000 metres	Aleksander Wiącek; OKS Start Otwock	14:05.20 PB	Patryk Kozłowski; RLTL Optima Radom	14:12.16	Artur Olejarz; MKL Szczecin	14:16.50 PB
110 metres hurdles	Damian Czykier; KS Podlasie Białystok	13.37	Olgierd Michniewski; RLTL Optima Radom	14.02	Dominik Staśkiewicz; AZS-AWF Warszawa	14.53
400 metres hurdles	Robert Bryliński; OŚ AZS Poznań	50.66	Krzysztof Hołub; AZS UMCS Lublin	50.94 PB	Sebastian Urbaniak; LKS Vectra Włocławek	51.20
3000 metres steeplechase	Mikołaj Czeronek; WKS Śląsk Wrocław	8:53.49 PB	Michał Zieleń; ULKS Technik Trzcinica	8:56.36 PB	Mateusz Kaczor; RLTL Optima Radom	8:58.50
4 × 100 metres relay	AZS-AWF Katowice; Jacek Majewski; Karol Kwiatkowski; Przemysław Kozłowski; Przemysław Słowikowski	39.93	OŚ AZS Poznań; Krzysztof Grześkowiak; Patryk Wykrota; Adrian Wesela; Mateusz Siuda	40.37	KS Agros Zamość; Przemysław Adamski; Patryk Krupa; Michał Jakóbczyk; Dominik Kopeć	40.79
4 × 400 metres relay	OŚ AZS Poznań; Jakub Olejniczak; Jakub Krzewina; Tymoteusz Zimny; Robert Bryliński	3:08.30	AZS UMCS Lublin; Mikołaj Kotyra; Cezary Mirosław; Maciej Hołub; Andrzej Jaros	3:08.41	AZS-AWF Katowice; Adam Paździerz; Jakub Pająk; Przemysław Kozłowski; Jacek Majewski	3:11.17
10,000 metres walk	Łukasz Niedziałek; WLKS Nowe Iganie	39:32.52	Rafał Fedaczyński; AZS UMCS Lublin	44:11.98	Mateusz Nowak; UKS Skoczek Skoki	44:38.08
High jump	Norbert Kobielski; MKS Inowrocław	2.26	Mateusz Kołodziejski; CWZS Zawisza Bydgoszcz SL	2.23 PB	Sylwester Bednarek; RKS Łódź	2.16
Pole vault	Piotr Lisek; OSOT Szczecin	5.80	Robert Sobera; KS AZS AWF Wrocław	5.70	Paweł Wojciechowski; CWZS Zawisza Bydgoszcz	5.70
Long jump	Andrzej Kuch; Non-associated	8.05 PB	Tomasz Jaszczuk; AZS-AWF Katowice	7.71	Mateusz Jopek; KS AZS AWF Wrocław	7.67
Triple jump	Adrian Świderski; WKS Śląsk Wrocław	16.38	Filip Sacha; KS AZS AWF Kraków	15.72	Dawid Krzemiński; RLTL Optima Radom	15.43
Shot put	Michał Haratyk; KS Sprint Bielsko-Biała	20.81	Jakub Szyszkowski; AZS-AWF Katowice	20.00	Jan Parol; WLKS Nowe Iganie	19.37 PB
Discus throw	Piotr Małachowski; WKS Śląsk Wrocław	64.67	Bartłomiej Stój; AZS KU Politechniki Opolskiej Opole	63.56	Robert Urbanek; MKS Aleksandrów Łódzki	62.33
Hammer throw	Paweł Fajdek; AZS-AWF Katowice	82.82	Wojciech Nowicki; KS Podlasie Białystok	80.86	Marcin Wrotyński; OŚ AZS Poznań	71.29
Javelin throw	Marcin Krukowski; KS Warszawianka Warszawa	83.86	Cyprian Mrzygłód; AZS-AWFiS Gdańsk	78.20	Mateusz Kwaśniewski; AZS UMCS Lublin	76.86

=== Women ===
Event	Gold		Silver		Bronze	
100 metres	Pia Skrzyszowska; AZS-AWF Warszawa	11.22 PB	Klaudia Adamek; KS Gwardia Piła	11.31 PB	Paulina Guzowska; AZS-AWF Katowice	11.36 PB
200 metres	Marlena Gola; KS Podlasie Białystok	23.39	Paulina Guzowska; AZS-AWF Katowice	23.41 PB	Wiktoria Grzyb; MKL Szczecin	23.53 PB
400 metres	Natalia Kaczmarek; KS AZS AWF Wrocław	50.72 PB	Justyna Święty-Ersetic; AZS-AWF Katowice	51.52	Małgorzata Hołub-Kowalik; AZS UMCS Lublin	51.77
800 metres	Angelika Sarna; AZS-AWF Warszawa	2:00.28	Anna Wielgosz; CWKS Resovia Rzeszów	2:00.57	Joanna Jóźwik; AZS-AWF Katowice	2:00.73
1500 metres	Eliza Megger; LKS Pszczyna	4:11.48	Martyna Galant; OŚ AZS Poznań	4:11.73	Beata Topka; ULKS Talex Borzytuchom	4:12.00 PB
5000 metres	Beata Topka; ULKS Talex Borzytuchom	16:03.91 PB	Izabela Paszkiewicz; AZS UMCS Lublin	16:05.50	Monika Jackiewicz; MKL Szczecin	16:05.95
100 metres hurdles	Pia Skrzyszowska; AZS-AWF Warszawa	12.85	Klaudia Siciarz; KS AZS AWF Kraków	12.92	Klaudia Wojtunik; AZS Łódź	13.19
400 metres hurdles	Joanna Linkiewicz; KS AZS AWF Wrocław	56.32	Julia Korzuch; AZS-AWF Katowice	57.12 PB	Emilia Ankiewicz; AZS-AWF Warszawa	57.82
3000 metres steeplechase	Aneta Konieczek; WMLKS Nadodrze Powodowo	9:25.98 PB	Alicja Konieczek; OŚ AZS Poznań	9:27.79 PB	Kinga Królik; UKS Azymut Pabianice	9:41.80 PB
4 × 100 metres relay	AZS-AWF Warszawa; Ada Kołodziej; Anna Maria Gryc; Justyna Paluch; Paulina Paluch	45.04	CWZS Zawisza Bydgoszcz SL; Dominika Małkowska; Katarzyna Sokólska; Zuzanna Kogut; Marika Popowicz-Drapała	45.15	RLTL Optima Radom; Martyna Osińska; Natalia Wosztyl; Alicja Potasznik; Martyna Kotwiła	45.24
4 × 400 metres relay	AZS UMCS Lublin; Alicja Wrona; Wiktoria Drozd; Agata Wasiluk; Małgorzata Hołub-Kowalik	3:36.70	RLTL Optima Radom; Izabela Smolińska; Martyna Kotwiła; Alicja Potasznik; Natalia Wosztyl	3:39.78	KS AZS AWF Kraków; Katarzyna Martyna; Aleksandra Wsołek; Margarita Koczanowa; Mariola Karaś	3:40.58
5,000 metres walk	Agnieszka Ellward; WKS Flota Gdynia	24:01.24	Anna Ździebło; LKS Stal Mielec	24:20.26 PB	Magdalena Żelazna; AZS-AWF Gorzów	24:25.82
High jump	Kamila Lićwinko; KS Podlasie Białystok	1.92	Wiktoria Miąso; CWKS Resovia Rzeszów	1.85 PB	Aneta Rydz; RLTL Optima Radom	1.82
Pole vault	Kamila Przybyła; CWZS Zawisza Bydgoszcz SL	4.10	Emilia Kusy; SKLA Sopot	4.00	Anna Łyko; KS AZS AWF Wrocław	4.00
Long jump	Adrianna Szóstak; OŚ AZS Poznań	6.39 PB	Anna Matuszewicz; MKL Toruń	6.33	Karolina Kucharczyk; MUKS Kadet Rawicz	6.24 PB
Triple jump	Adrianna Szóstak; OŚ AZS Poznań	13.92	Karolina Młodawska; KKL Kielce	13.60 PB	Agnieszka Bednarek; AZS Łódź	13.44
Shot put	Paulina Guba; AZS UMCS Lublin	18.29	Klaudia Kardasz; KS Podlasie Białystok	17.33	Maja Ślepowrońska; AZS-AWF Warszawa	17.16 PB
Discus throw	Daria Zabawska; AZS UMCS Lublin	57.90	Karolina Urban; AZS-AWFiS Gdańsk	57.86 PB	Karolina Sygutowska; ZLKL Zielona Góra	52.04
Hammer throw	Malwina Kopron; AZS UMCS Lublin	75.42	Anita Włodarczyk; AZS-AWF Katowice	74.06	Joanna Fiodorow; OŚ AZS Poznań	72.31
Javelin throw	Maria Andrejczyk; LUKS Hańcza Suwałki	59.69	Klaudia Regin; LKS Jantar Ustka	54.87	Karolina Bołdysz; AZS-AWFiS Gdańsk	51.73

== Finals ==
=== Men ===
==== 100 metres ====
Rank	Lane	Athlete	Club	Reaction	Time	Notes
1st place, gold medalist(s)	4	Dominik Kopeć	KS Agros Zamość	0.148	10.31	
2nd place, silver medalist(s)	3	Przemysław Słowikowski	AZS-AWF Katowice	0.133	10.32	
3rd place, bronze medalist(s)	5	Mateusz Siuda	OŚ AZS Poznań	0.154	10.39	
4	2	Karol Kwiatkowski	AZS-AWF Katowice	0.162	10.48	SB
5	7	Przemysław Kozłowski	AZS-AWF Katowice	0.154	10.55	
6	6	Adrian Brzeziński	MKL Toruń	0.200	10.59	
7	8	Patryk Krupa	KS Agros Zamość	0.146	10.73	
8	1	Jakub Gałandziej	OŚ AZS Poznań	0.157	18.83	

==== 200 metres ====
Rank	Lane	Athlete	Club	Reaction	Time	Notes
1st place, gold medalist(s)	2	Adrian Brzeziński	MKL Toruń	0.161	20.99	
2nd place, silver medalist(s)	6	Oliwer Wdowik	CWKS Resovia Rzeszów	0.111	21.05	
3rd place, bronze medalist(s)	3	Łukasz Żok	ALKS AJP Gorzów Wlkp.	0.180	21.07	
4	5	Damian Trzaska	MKS Bank BS Płońsk	0.164	21.19	
5	4	Patryk Wykrotka	OŚ AZS Poznań	0.193	21.33	
6	7	Przemysław Kozłowski	AZS-AWF Katowice	0.176	21.50	
7	8	Igor Bogaczyński	MKL Jarocin	0.229	21.51	
8	1	Mateusz Siuda	OŚ AZS Poznań	0.203	26.02	

==== 400 metres ====
Rank	Lane	Athlete	Club	Time	Notes
1st place, gold medalist(s)	4	Kajetan Duszyński	AZS Łódź	45.96	
2nd place, silver medalist(s)	8	Mateusz Rzeźniczak	RKS Łódź	46.10	PB
3rd place, bronze medalist(s)	3	Karol Zalewski	AZS-AWF Katowice	46.12	
4	6	Wiktor Suwara	AZS-AWF Warszawa	46.35	SB
5	5	Dariusz Kowaluk	AZS-AWF Warszawa	46.43	
6	2	Jakub Krzewina	OŚ AZS Poznań	47.39	
7	1	Cezary Mirosław	AZS UMCS Lublin	47.44	
8	7	Tymoteusz Zimny	OŚ AZS Poznań	47.49	

==== 800 metres ====
Rank	Lane	Athlete	Club	Time	Notes
1st place, gold medalist(s)	5	Patryk Dobek	MKL Szczecin	1:48.21	
2nd place, silver medalist(s)	4	Mateusz Borkowski	RKS Łódź	1:49.10	
3rd place, bronze medalist(s)	1	Patryk Sieradzki	CWZS Zawisza Bydgoszcz SL	1:49.43	SB
4	6	Filip Ostrowski	RKS Łódź	1:50.96	
5	8	Jakub Szkudlarek	RKS Łódź	1:51.15	
6	3	Jakub Augustyniak	RKS Łódź	1:51.20	
7	7	Adam Masaczyński	KKL Kielce	1:51.53	
8	2	Krzysztof Turski	RLTL Optima Radom	1:51.91	

==== 1500 metres ====
Rank	Lane	Athlete	Club	Time	Notes
1st place, gold medalist(s)	15	Marcin Lewandowski	AZS UMCS Lublin	3:49.49	
2nd place, silver medalist(s)	16	Michał Rozmys	UKS Barnim Goleniów	3:49.60	
3rd place, bronze medalist(s)	13	Andrzej Kowalczyk	ULKS Fajfer 2001 Łapanów	3:50.96	
4	12	Oliwier Mutwil	CKS Budowlani Częstochowa	3:51.38	
5	1	Adam Czerwiński	UKS Lider Siercza	3:51.60	
6	14	Szymon Żywko	AZS UMCS Lublin	3:54.22	
7	4	Grzegorz Petrusiewicz	AZS Łódź	3:55.12	SB
8	10	Krzysztof Wasiewicz	SRS Kondycja Piaseczno	3:55.38	
9	11	Krzysztof Turski	RLTL Optima Radom	3:55.79	
10	3	Szymon Dobaj	Kraków Athletics Team	3:55.85	SB
11	9	Dawid Borowski	KS Stal LA Ostrów Wlkp.	3:56.28	
12	6	Łukasz Wietecki	OŚ AZS Poznań	3:56.45	
13	5	Tomasz Przybylak	OŚ AZS Poznań	3:56.54	
14	7	Jan Michalski	MKS Polonia Warszawa	3:59.08	
15	2	Paweł Rapta	Kraków Athletics Team	4:00.04	
	8	Wojciech Sowik	RKS Łódź	DNS	

==== 5000 metres ====
Rank	Lane	Athlete	Club	Time	Notes
1st place, gold medalist(s)	21	Aleksander Wiącek	OKS Start Otwock	14:05.20	PB
2nd place, silver medalist(s)	6	Patryk Kozłowski	RLTL Optima Radom	14:12.16	SB
3rd place, bronze medalist(s)	23	Artur Olejarz	MKL Szczecin	14:16.50	PB
4	24	Adam Głogowski	UKS Ekonomik-Maratończyk Lębork	14:18.20	
5	19	Bartosz Jarczok	AZS-AWF Katowice	14:18.29	PB
6	17	Damian Kabat	WMLKS Pomorze Stargard	14:20.14	SB
7	18	Dariusz Boratyński	KS AZS AWF Wrocław	14:21.06	SB
8	4	Sebastian Nowicki	OKL Oborniki	14:26.47	SB
9	10	Patryk Stypułkowski	MKS Tomaszów Mazowiecki	14:27.46	PB
10	1	Kamil Karbowiak	LZS KL Kotwica Brzeg	14:27.65	
11	2	Mateusz Kaczor	RLTL Optima Radom	14:29.59	
12	11	Kamil Młynarz	SKB Kraśnik	14:34.20	PB
13	22	Oliwier Mutwil	CKS Budowlani Częstochowa	14:34.76	
14	20	Wiktor Szynaka	MKL Toruń	14:36.87	
15	3	Mikołaj Czeronek	WKS Śląsk Wrocław	14:38.78	PB
16	14	Piotr Mielewczyk	Stowarzyszenie Piekielni Warszawa	14:41.29	PB
17	15	Krzysztof Wasiewicz	SRS Kondycja Piaseczno	14:53.43	
18	13	Krzysztof Szymanowski	UKS Czwórka Kościan	14:53.98	
19	16	Mateusz Gos	RLTL Optima Radom	14:57.71	
20	7	Krzysztof Żygenda	GKS Żukowo	14:58.76	
21	12	Michał Wójcik	KS AZS AWF Wrocław	15:04.90	
22	5	Szymon Dorożyński	AZS KU Politechniki Opolskiej Opole	15:20.03	
23	9	Mateusz Lipiński	AML Słupsk	15:32.59	
	8	Tomasz Szymański	MKS Siechnice	DNF	

==== 110 metres hurdles ====
Rank	Lane	Athlete	Club	Reaction	Time	Notes
1st place, gold medalist(s)	5	Damian Czykier	KS Podlasie Białystok	0.174	13.37	SB
2nd place, silver medalist(s)	3	Olgierd Michniewski	RLTL Optima Radom	0.142	14.02	
3rd place, bronze medalist(s)	7	Dominik Staśkiewicz	AZS-AWF Warszawa	0.198	14.53	
4	2	Jakub Kalinowski	AZS-AWF Warszawa	0.123	14.91	
5	1	Krystian Siniło	KS Podlasie Białystok	0.209	15.48	
	4	Artur Noga	AZS-AWF Warszawa	—	DNS	
	6	Krzysztof Kilian	AZS-AWF Warszawa	0.147	DNF	
	8	Jakub Bujak	AZS KU Politechniki Opolskiej Opole	0.235	DNF	

==== 400 metres hurdles ====
Rank	Lane	Athlete	Club	Reaction	Time	Notes
1st place, gold medalist(s)	5	Robert Bryliński	OŚ AZS Poznań	0.210	50.66	SB
2nd place, silver medalist(s)	6	Krzysztof Hołub	AZS UMCS Lublin	0.208	50.94	PB
3rd place, bronze medalist(s)	3	Sebastian Urbaniak	LKS Vectra Włocławek	0.200	51.20	
4	8	Patryk Adamczyk	RLTL Optima Radom	0.196	51.61	
5	7	Jakub Sobura-Durma	KKL Kielce	0.275	51.81	
6	4	Jakub Olejniczak	OŚ AZS Poznań	0.172	51.84	
7	2	Dawid Buck	AZS KU Politechniki Opolskiej Opole	0.240	52.58	PB
8	1	Piotr Kidoń	KS AZS AWF Kraków	0.218	53.42	

==== 3000 metres steeplechase ====
Rank	Lane	Athlete	Club	Time	Notes
1st place, gold medalist(s)	16	Mikołaj Czeronek	WKS Śląsk Wrocław	8:53.49	PB
2nd place, silver medalist(s)	14	Michał Zieleń	ULKS Technik Trzcinica	8:56.36	PB
3rd place, bronze medalist(s)	13	Mateusz Kaczor	RLTL Optima Radom	8:58.50	SB
4	12	Mateusz Kaczmarek	BKS Bydgoszcz	9:02.07	SB
5	9	Jarosław Kucharski	RLTL Optima Radom	9:06.66	PB
6	4	Marcin Ciepłak	TL ROW Rybnik	9:06.90	
7	6	Jakub Strzelczyk	UKS Olimp Kozienice	9:07.24	PB
8	11	Rafał Pogorzelski	KS Prefbet-Sonarol	9:13.59	
9	8	Adam Kubicki	MKS Polonia Warszawa	9:13.72	PB
10	15	Nikodem Dworczak	WMLKS Nadodrze Powodowo	9:16.44	
11	1	Adam Kołodziej	MUKS Wisła Junior Sandomierz	9:16.74	PB
12	7	Daniel Kryzel	ULKS Talex Borzytuchom	9:28.87	
13	3	Dominik Tabor	Kraków Athletics Team	9:30.63	
14	10	Stanisław Lebioda	RLTL Optima Radom	9:37.31	
15	5	Kamil Szymaniak	MKS Agros Chełm	9:37.79	
16	2	Mateusz Chyliński	Kraków Athletics Team	9:51.64	
	17	Krystian Zalewski	UKS Barnim Goleniów	DNF	

==== 4 × 100 metres relay ====
Rank	Heat	Lane	Club	Competitors	Reaction	Time	Notes
1st place, gold medalist(s)	2	6	AZS-AWF Katowice	Jacek Majewki; Karol Kwiatkowski; Przemysław Kozłowski; Przemysław Słowikowski	0.145	39.93	
2nd place, silver medalist(s)	2	5	OŚ AZS Poznań	Krzysztof Grześkowiak; Patryk Wykrota; Adrian Wesela; Mateusz Siuda	0.214	40.37	
3rd place, bronze medalist(s)	2	4	KS Podlasie Białystok	Radosław Sacharczuk; Damian Czykier; Artur Łęczycki; Maksymilian Klepacki	0.213	41.17	
4	2	3	AML Słupsk	Piotr Michalak; Szymon Depta; Oliwier Kołodziejski; Marek Zakrzewski	0.155	41.98	
5	1	3	CWZS Zawisza Bydgoszcz SL	Dominik Boiński; Filip Malendowicz; Dawid Kaszyński; Jakub Grzegrzółka	0.211	42.23	
6	2	7	KS Stal LA Ostrów Wlkp.	Michał Jopek; Dawid Grząka; Kacper Zimniak; Karol Błaszczak	0.148	42.56	
7	1	7	KS Sprinterzy.com Kraków	Łukasz Malanowski; Jakub Szkopański; Piotr Tymiński; Norbert Waśkiewicz	0.197	43.93	
8	1	5	KS Sprinterzy.com Kraków II	Jakub Sobiech; Damian Płaskowicki; Jan Socha; Eryk Burkiewicz	0.182	45.06	
8	1	6	UKS Błyskawica Domaniewice	Jakub Sejdak; Antoni Knera; Szymon Taraska; Tomasz Wieteska	0.212	45.33	
	1	4	KS Agros Zamość	Przemysław Adamski; Patryk Krupa; Michał Jakóbczyk; Dominik Kopeć	0.159	DQ	TR 17.3.1

==== 4 × 400 metres relay ====
Rank	Lane	Club	Competitors	Reaction	Time	Notes
1st place, gold medalist(s)	4	OŚ AZS Poznań	Jakub Olejniczak; Jakub Krzewina; Tymoteusz Zimny; Robert Bryliński	0.226	3:08.30	
2nd place, silver medalist(s)	5	AZS UMCS Lublin	Mikołaj Kotyra; Cezary Mirosław; Maciej Hołub; Andrzej Jaros	0.210	3:08.41	
3rd place, bronze medalist(s)	7	AZS-AWF Katowice	Adam Paździerz; Jakub Pająk; Przemysław Kozłowski; Jacek Majewski	0.215	3:11.17	
4	8	OŚ AZS Poznań II	Mikołaj Buzała; Amadeusz Zdrojewski; Mikołaj Nawrot; Jan Wawrzkowicz	0.158	3:13.31	
5	6	AZS KU Politechniki Opolskiej Opole	Bartosz Habrych; Rafał Jurczyński; Robin Biliński; Dawid Buck	0.131	3:13.57	
6	3	RKS Łódź	Maciej Jończyk; Filip Ostrowski; Jakub Szkudlarek; Jakub Augustyniak	0.228	3:45.79	

==== 10,000 metres walk ====
Rank	Lane	Athlete	Club	Time	Notes
1st place, gold medalist(s)	6	Łukasz Niedziałek	WLKS Nowe Iganie	39:32.52	
2nd place, silver medalist(s)	3	Rafał Fedaczyński	AZS UMCS Lublin	44:11.98	
3rd place, bronze medalist(s)	5	Mateusz Nowak	UKS Skoczek Skoki	44:38.08	
4	4	Arkadiusz Schiedel	MLKS Nadwiślanin Chełmno	45:32.12	PB
5	2	Rafał Sikora	AZS-AWF Katowice	45:54.02	
6	1	Miłosz Oczkoś	MLKS Nadwiślanin Chełmno	47:14.83	PB

==== High jump ====
Rank	Athlete	Club	1.88	1.93	1.98	2.03	2.08	2.12	2.16	2.20	2.23	2.26	2.30	Height	Notes
1st place, gold medalist(s)	Norbert Kobielski	MKS Inowrocław	—	—	—	—	o	o	o	o	xo	xo	xxx	2.26	SB
2nd place, silver medalist(s)	Mateusz Kołodziejski	CWZS Zawisza Bydgoszcz SL	—	—	—	xxo	xo	o	xxo	o	xo	xxx		2.23	PB
3rd place, bronze medalist(s)	Sylwester Bednarek	RKS Łódź	—	—	—	o	xo	xxo	xo	xxx				2.16	
4	Damian Donakowski	GKS Olimpia Grudziądz	—	o	xo	o	xo	xxx						2.08	=PB
5	Marcin Jachym	CWKS Resovia Rzeszów	—	o	xo	xxo	xo	xxx						2.08	
6	Jakub Moskal	KS Podlasie Białystok	—	—	xxo	o	xxx							2.03	
7	Sebastian Moszczyński	KS Podlasie Białystok	—	—	o	xo	xxx							2.03	
7	Jakub Hołub	AZS UMCS Lublin	—	o	o	xo	xxx							2.03	
9	Igor Fiała	LUKS Namysłów	o	o	o	xxo	xxx							2.03	PB
10	Piotr Jaroszkiewicz	KS AZS-AWF Biała Podlaska	—	o	o	xxx								1.98	
10	Cezar Sidya	GKS Olimpia Grudziądz	—	o	o	xxx								1.98	
12	Filip Kostkiewicz	KS AZS AWF Kraków	o	xo	o	xxx								1.98	
13	Kewin Małek	AML Słupsk	o	xo	xo	xxx								1.98	
14	Jakub Nielub	AML Słupsk	o	o	xxx									1.93	
15	Adrian Kordoński	LKS Fenix Słupsk	—	xo	xxx									1.93	
	Przemysław Rutowicz	AZS-AWF Katowice	xxx											NM	

==== Pole vault ====
Rank	Athlete	Club	4.20	4.40	4.60	4.80	5.00	5.20	5.40	5.60	5.70	5.80	5.92	Height	Notes
1st place, gold medalist(s)	Piotr Lisek	OSOT Szczecin	—	—	—	—	—	—	o	o	x—	o	xxx	5.80	SB
2nd place, silver medalist(s)	Robert Sobera	KS AZS AWF Wrocław	—	—	—	—	—	—	xo	x—	o	xxx		5.70	=SB
3rd place, bronze medalist(s)	Paweł Wojciechowski	CWZS Zawisza Bydgoszcz SL	—	—	—	—	—	—	xxo	—	xo	r		5.70	SB
4	Sebastian Chmara	CWZS Zawisza Bydgoszcz SL	—	—	xo	o	xxo	xxr						5.00	=PB
5	Karol Pawlik	CWKS Resovia Rzeszów	—	—	—	o	xxx							4.80	
6	Michał Gawenda	OKS Skra Warszawa	—	xxo	xo	o	xxx							4.80	
7	Adrian Kupczak	UKS Olimp Mazańcowice	—	—	xo	xo	xxx							4.80	=SB
8	Paweł Nawocki	KS AZS AWF Wrocław	—	o	o	xxx								4.60	
8	Przemysław Czerniak	SL Olimpia Poznań	—	o	o	xxx								4.60	SB
10	Filip Kempski	UKS Olimp Mazańcowice	—	o	xxo	xxx								4.60	=SB
11	Stanisław Szewczyk	AZS-AWF Warszawa	—	xxo	xxx									4.40	
12	Dariusz Nowak	Ośrodek Skoku o Tyczce Gdańsk	xo	xxx										4.20	
	Jakub Piwowarski	AZS-AWF Warszawa	—	xxx										NM	

==== Long jump ====
Rank	Athlete	Club	1	2	3	4	5	6	Distance	Notes
1st place, gold medalist(s)	Andrzej Kuch	Non-associated	7.40	7.82	7.86	7.96	7.85	8.05	8.05	PB
2nd place, silver medalist(s)	Tomasz Jaszczuk	AZS-AWF Katowice	7.65	7.61	7.71	7.44	—	7.54	7.71	SB
3rd place, bronze medalist(s)	Mateusz Jopek	KS AZS AWF Wrocław	7.56	7.56	7.54	7.67	7.63	7.55	7.67	=SB
4	Piotr Tarkowski	KS AZS-AWF Biała Podlaska	7.46	7.51	7.56	7.51	x	7.55	7.56	
5	Mateusz Różański	CWKS Resovia Rzeszów	x	x	7.55	7.27	7.52	x	7.55	SB
6	Krzysztof Tomasiak	UKS Junior Kamesznica	7.39	7.40	x	7.16	x	x	7.40	
7	Kacper Lemieszek	KS Agros Zamość	7.30	7.35	7.05	x	6.78	6.87	7.35	PB
8	Norbert Kański	AZS-AWFiS Gdańsk	x	7.14	7.06	7.10	x	4.33	7.14	SB
9	Bartosz Chojnowski	KS Podlasie Białystok	7.14	x	7.00				7.14	
10	Dawid Krzemiński	RLTL Optima Radom	6.97	7.08	6.90				7.08	
11	Damian Czarnocki	KS AZS-AWF Biała Podlaska	7.07	6.80	6.98				7.07	
12	Bartosz Gąbka	AZS-AWF Warszawa	x	x	7.07				7.07	
	Paweł Basałygo	AZS KU Politechniki Opolskiej Opole	x	x	x				NM	
	Adrian Brzeziński	MKL Toruń							DNS	
	Adrian Strzałkowski	STS Pomerania Szczecin							DNS	

==== Triple jump ====
Rank	Athlete	Club	1	2	3	4	5	6	Distance	Notes
1st place, gold medalist(s)	Adrian Świderski	WKS Śląsk Wrocław	x	16.38	16.23	16.17	x	x	16.38	SB
2nd place, silver medalist(s)	Filip Sacha	KS AZS AWF Kraków	15.72	15.60	15.06	15.57	15.29	15.37	15.72	
3rd place, bronze medalist(s)	Dawid Krzemiński	RLTL Optima Radom	15.05	x	15.43	13.83	14.85	14.77	15.43	
4	Jan Kulmaczewski	UKS Kapry-armexim Pruszków	15.14	x	14.54	14.96	14.75	15.17	15.17	
5	Kamil Wąż	LKS Stal Mielec	x	15.15	x	x	14.79	x	15.15	
6	Bartosz Świerczyna	AZS-AWF Katowice	x	15.00	14.57	x	x	x	15.00	SB
7	Kacper Rudnik	NKS Nowe Miasto Lubawskie	14.07	14.77	x	x	14.50	14.61	14.77	
8	Patryk Komar	AZS KU Politechniki Opolskiej Opole	14.06	14.52	x	14.59	14.55	x	14.59	
9	Łukasz Sobora	KS Lemiesz Team Warszawa	14.41	14.08	13.90				14.41	PB
10	Jakub Bracki	BKL Bełchatów	14.24	14.09	x				14.24	
11	Wiktor Wałęcki	MKS Aleksandrów Łódzki	13.68	14.05	x				14.05	
12	Michał Szumiec	KS AZS AWF Kraków	13.98	x	14.01				14.01	
13	Adrian Olszewski	MKS Piast Głogów	13.25	x	x				13.25	
	Jakub Daroszewski	CWZS Zawisza Bydgoszcz SL	x	x	x				NM	
	Jakub Stybor	SKLA Sopot							DNS	

==== Shot put ====
Rank	Athlete	Club	1	2	3	4	5	6	Distance	Notes
1st place, gold medalist(s)	Michał Haratyk	KS Sprint Bielsko-Biała	20.43	x	20.81	x	20.22	20.80	20.81	
2nd place, silver medalist(s)	Jakub Szyszkowski	AZS-AWF Katowice	19.53	19.68	20.00	x	19.73	x	20.00	
3rd place, bronze medalist(s)	Jan Parol	WLKS Nowe Iganie	17.71	x	18.66	19.22	19.01	19.37	19.37	PB
4	Sebastian Łukszo	AZS UMCS Lublin	17.35	x	17.47	18.18	18.44	18.73	18.73	
5	Andrzej Gudro	WLKS Nowe Iganie	17.33	18.28	18.42	x	x	x	18.42	SB
6	Szymon Mazur	MKS-MOS Płomień Sosnowiec	17.38	17.73	17.68	18.02	17.81	18.17	18.17	SB
7	Piotr Goździewicz	AZS-AWF Warszawa	17.76	x	18.07	17.70	x	x	18.07	
8	Wojciech Marok	MKL Jurand Szczytno	16.63	17.81	17.14	x	x	x	17.81	
9	Rafał Kownatke	LKS Ziemi Puckiej Puck	x	17.06	x				17.06	
10	Bartłomiej Uchman	AZS-AWF Katowice	15.81	16.79	x				16.79	PB
11	Jakub Dzik	MKS-MOS Płomień Sosnowiec	15.59	16.03	15.91				16.03	
12	Jakub Borkowski	MKL Jurand Szczytno	15.02	x	x				15.02	
	Kornel Warszawski	KS Agros Zamość							DNS	

==== Discus throw ====
Rank	Athlete	Club	1	2	3	4	5	6	Distance	Notes
1st place, gold medalist(s)	Piotr Małachowski	WKS Śląsk Wrocław	62.81	63.89	63.73	63.64	x	64.67	64.67	SB
2nd place, silver medalist(s)	Bartłomiej Stój	AZS KU Politechniki Opolskiej Opole	63.56	x	x	x	x	x	63.56	
3rd place, bronze medalist(s)	Robert Urbanek	MKS Aleksandrów Łódzki	61.08	60.59	59.49	x	61.34	62.33	62.33	
4	Oskar Stachnik	AZS UMCS Lublin	59.07	x	x	58.24	x	60.07	60.07	
5	Jakub Lewoszewski	KS Agros Zamość	53.48	x	x	50.70	x	53.61	53.61	
6	Marcin Darga	LKS Ziemi Puckiej Puck	47.79	49.64	49.60	x	49.31	49.41	49.64	SB
7	Patryk Zygmunt	KS AZS AWF Wrocław	48.69	x	x	x	46.61	44.37	48.69	
8	Jakub Borkowski	MKL Jurand Szczytno	46.55	45.98	45.20	45.52	44.13	44.79	46.55	PB
9	Mateusz Gładkowski	MKL Szczecin	x	x	45.48				45.48	
10	Michał Jarmołowicz	WKS Śląsk Wrocław	43.35	44.85	44.91				44.91	
11	Szymon Pudłowski	AZS-AWF Katowice	44.77	x	x				44.77	SB
	Wojciech Marok	MKL Jurand Szczytno	x	x	x				NM	

==== Hammer throw ====
Rank	Athlete	Club	1	2	3	4	5	6	Distance	Notes
1st place, gold medalist(s)	Paweł Fajdek	AZS-AWF Katowice	74.99	x	77.62	80.07	78.55	82.82	82.82	
2nd place, silver medalist(s)	Wojciech Nowicki	KS Podlasie Białystok	77.71	80.86	79.06	79.41	80.81	79.41	80.86	SB
3rd place, bronze medalist(s)	Marcin Wrotyński	OŚ AZS Poznań	69.33	71.06	x	68.91	71.29	69.46	71.29	
4	Dawid Piłat	LKS Stal Mielec	67.98	70.63	x	70.91	71.19	70.68	71.19	
5	Tomasz Ratajczyk	AZS-AWF Warszawa	64.04	x	67.51	x	x	66.72	67.51	PB
6	Michał Mazur	KS Agros Zamość	67.07	62.03	63.28	64.85	x	65.98	67.07	PB
7	Arkadiusz Rogowski	KS Agros Zamość	63.43	x	62.19	x	r		63.43	
8	Bartosz Kowalski	WKS Śląsk Wrocław	57.48	59.27	59.45	59.87	x	x	59.87	
9	Adam Ziółkowski	MKS Juvenia Puszczykowo	58.34	59.14	x				59.14	
10	Kamil Swancar	OŚ AZS Poznań	58.96	57.89	58.51				58.96	
11	Gracjan Sabajtis	AZS-AWF Gorzów	x	57.06	58.69				58.69	SB
12	Patryk Warchoł	OKS Skra Warszawa	56.10	x	56.74				56.74	
13	Mateusz Modrzejewski	LLKS Pomorze Stargard	54.47	54.30	55.92				55.92	
14	Adam Ptak	WKS Śląsk Wrocław	53.92	55.78	x				55.78	
15	Jan Usarek	AZS UMCS Lublin	54.36	49.03	54.61				54.61	
16	Adam Zielonka	KS Wisła Puławy	x	x	54.35				54.35	
	Mariusz Walczak	AZS-AWF Warszawa							DNS	

==== Javelin throw ====
Rank	Athlete	Club	1	2	3	4	5	6	Distance	Notes
1st place, gold medalist(s)	Marcin Krukowski	KS Warszawianka W-wa	83.86	x	x	x	x	x	83.86	
2nd place, silver medalist(s)	Cyprian Mrzygłód	AZS-AWFiS Gdańsk	74.24	x	74.09	75.96	76.22	78.20	78.20	
3rd place, bronze medalist(s)	Mateusz Kwaśniewski	AZS UMCS Lublin	73.41	76.86	x	x	x	x	76.86	
4	Dawid Wegner	LUKS Start Nakło	70.55	75.72	75.08	73.04	75.95	75.62	75.95	
5	Piotr Lebioda	LUKS Hańcza Suwałki	71.05	66.51	69.74	73.75	70.48	x	73.75	SB
6	Hubert Chmielak	LUKS Hańcza Suwałki	69.96	x	x	71.77	72.37	69.19	72.37	
7	Eryk Kołodziejczak	LUKS Start Nakło	67.35	x	70.71	x	63.61	64.37	70.71	
8	Wiktor Mertka	UKS Cyprianka	59.14	65.57	64.56	x	63.21	x	65.57	
9	Dawid Kościów	LKS Jantar Ustka	64.49	63.62	63.97				64.49	
10	Wojciech Sumiński	AZS-AWF Warszawa	61.42	61.96	61.59				61.96	
11	Sebastian Chudzik	ULKS Uczniak Szprotawa	60.24	56.66	55.30				60.24	SB
12	Łukasz Wisełka	ULKS Uczniak Szprotawa	x	x	58.08				58.08	
13	Hubert Trzeciakowski	UKS Cyprianka	56.12	x	x				56.12	
	Rafał Gierek	AZS-AWF Warszawa	x	x	x				NM	
	Maciej Topolewski	AZS-AWF Warszawa	x	x	x				NM	
	Oskar Trejgo	KS Podlasie Białystok							DNS	

=== Women ===
==== 100 metres ====
Rank	Lane	Athlete	Club	Reaction	Time	Notes
1st place, gold medalist(s)	5	Pia Skrzyszowska	AZS-AWF Warszawa	0.200	11.22	PB
2nd place, silver medalist(s)	6	Klaudia Adamek	KS Gwardia Piła	0.157	11.31	PB
3rd place, bronze medalist(s)	8	Paulina Guzowska	AZS-AWF Katowice	0.151	11.36	PB
4	1	Paulina Paluch	AZS-AWF Warszawa	0.170	11.45	PB
5	2	Marlena Gola	KS Podlasie Białystok	0.123	11.48	=PB
6	7	Ada Kołodziej	AZS-AWF Warszawa	0.103	11.57	SB
7	4	Julia Polak	TL ROW Rybnik	0.233	11.60	PB
	3	Marika Popowicz-Drapała	CWZS Zawisza Bydgoszcz SL	0.082	DQ	TR 16.8

==== 200 metres ====
Rank	Lane	Athlete	Club	Reaction	Time	Notes
1st place, gold medalist(s)	3	Marlena Gola	KS Podlasie Białystok	0.236	23.39	
2nd place, silver medalist(s)	4	Paulina Guzowska	AZS-AWF Katowice	0.231	23.41	PB
3rd place, bronze medalist(s)	5	Wiktoria Grzyb	MKL Szczecin	0.162	23.53	PB
4	7	Alicja Wrona	AZS UMCS Lublin	0.377	23.73	
5	6	Julia Polak	TL ROW Rybnik	0.258	23.91	
6	8	Nikola Horowska	WMLKS Nadodrze Powodowo	0.284	24.00	
7	1	Martyna Kotwiła	RLTL Optima Radom	0.221	24.12	
	2	Monika Romaszko	KS Agros Zamość		DNS	

==== 400 metres ====
Rank	Lane	Athlete	Club	Reaction	Time	Notes
1st place, gold medalist(s)	5	Natalia Kaczmarek	KS AZS AWF Wrocław	0.236	50.72	PB
2nd place, silver medalist(s)	4	Justyna Święty-Ersetic	AZS-AWF Katowice	0.194	51.52	
3rd place, bronze medalist(s)	6	Małgorzata Hołub-Kowalik	AZS UMCS Lublin	0.271	51.77	
4	4	Iga Baumgart-Witan	BKS Bydgoszcz	0.307	52.17	
5	1	Anna Kiełbasińska	SKLA Sopot	0.159	52.20	SB
6	2	Dominika Baćmaga	AZS-AWF Warszawa	0.199	52.71	PB
7	7	Kinga Gacka	BKS Bydgoszcz	0.166	52.77	
8	8	Aleksandra Formella	SKLA Sopot	0.242	53.68	

==== 800 metres ====
Rank	Lane	Athlete	Club	Time	Notes
1st place, gold medalist(s)	4	Angelika Sarna	AZS-AWF Warszawa	2:00.28	
2nd place, silver medalist(s)	3	Anna Wielgosz	CWKS Resovia Rzeszów	2:00.57	SB
3rd place, bronze medalist(s)	5	Joanna Jóźwik	AZS-AWF Katowice	2:00.73	SB
4	6	Angelika Cichocka	SKLA Sopot	2:02.24	
5	2	Margarita Koczanowa	KS AZS AWF Kraków	2:03.12	PB
6	7	Eliza Megger	LKS Pszczyna	2:05.05	
	1	Aneta Lemiesz	KS Lemiesz Team Warszawa	DNF	
	8	Adrianna Czapla	AZS-AWF Katowice	DNF	

==== 1500 metres ====
Rank	Lane	Athlete	Club	Time	Notes
1st place, gold medalist(s)	15	Eliza Megger	LKS Pszczyna	4:11.48	
2nd place, silver medalist(s)	17	Martyna Galant	OŚ AZS Poznań	4:11.73	
3rd place, bronze medalist(s)	2	Beata Topka	ULKS Talex Borzytuchom	4:12.00	PB
4	14	Weronika Lizakowska	KUKS Remus Kościerzyna	4:12.31	
5	12	Klaudia Kazimierska	LKS Vectra Włocławek	4:15.23	SB
6	16	Renata Pliś	MKL Maraton Świnoujście	4:17.08	
7	13	Aleksandra Płocińska	SRS Kondycja Piaseczno	4:18.93	
8	11	Mariola Baranowska	MKS Żak Biała Podlaska	4:20.72	PB
9	10	Zuzanna Bronowska	Mazovia ProActiv Ciechanów	4:24.93	
10	6	Sandra Michalak	KS Prefbet-Sonarol	4:26.17	SB
11	8	Alicja Wójcik	MKS-MOSM Bytom	4:26.60	PB
12	7	Maria Hofman	OŚ AZS Poznań	4:29.54	
13	4	Monika Dubiella	LLKS Ziemi Kociewskiej Skórcz	4:33.65	SB
14	1	Wiktoria Wojtkowiak	KS Energetyk Poznań	4:34.49	
15	18	Weronika Lewna	LKS Fenix Słupsk	4:58.52	
	9	Milena Korbut	AZS-AWF Katowice	DNS	
	5	Katarzyna Chryczyk	KS AZS AWF Kraków	DNF	
	3	Aneta Lemiesz	KS Lemiesz Team Warszawa	DNF	

==== 5000 metres ====
Rank	Lane	Athlete	Club	Time	Notes
1st place, gold medalist(s)	14	Beata Topka	ULKS Talex Borzytuchom	16:03.91	PB
2nd place, silver medalist(s)	16	Izabela Paszkiewicz	AZS UMCS Lublin	16:05.50	
3rd place, bronze medalist(s)	15	Monika Jackiewicz	MKL Szczecin	16:05.95	
4	13	Oliwia Wawrzyniak	OŚ AZS Poznań	16:12.26	PB
5	8	Matylda Kowal	CWKS Resovia Rzeszów	16:25.32	SB
6	11	Oliwia Sarnecka	MKL Szczecin	16:26.76	PB
7	12	Julia Afelt	CWZS Zawisza Bydgoszcz SL	16:47.69	
8	7	Milena Sadowska	WMLKS Pomorze Stargard	16:57.32	SB
9	3	Anna Wiktorczyk	WMLKS Pomorze Stargard	17:00.35	PB
10	2	Martyna Budziłek	UKS Siódemka Ostrołęka	17:06.10	PB
11	5	Sandra Michalak	KS Prefbet-Sonarol	17:06.36	SB
12	4	Beata Klimek	KS AZS-AWF Biała Podlaska	17:27.98	
13	6	Patrycja Suchowiecka	TL Pogoń Ruda Śląska	17:29.96	
14	1	Anna Śleszycka	RKS Łódź	18:45.81	
	10	Renata Pliś	MKL Maraton Świnoujście	DNS	
	9	Kinga Królik	UKS Azymut Pabianice	DNF	

==== 100 metres hurdles ====
Rank	Lane	Athlete	Club	Reaction	Time	Notes
1st place, gold medalist(s)	5	Pia Skrzyszowska	AZS-AWF Warszawa	0.193	12.85	
2nd place, silver medalist(s)	4	Klaudia Siciarz	KS AZS AWF Kraków	0.218	12.92	
3rd place, bronze medalist(s)	5	Klaudia Wojtunik	AZS Łódź	0.223	13.19	
4	8	Zuzanna Hulisz	MKL Toruń	0.159	13.40	SB
5	6	Monika Kiepura	KS AZS AWF Kraków	0.151	13.40	
6	7	Weronika Nagięć	KS AZS AWF Kraków	0.187	13.61	
7	1	Marika Majewska	LUKS Orkan Września	0.131	13.65	
8	2	Julia Ziembicka	KS AZS AWF Kraków	0.146	13.79	

==== 400 metres hurdles ====
Rank	Lane	Athlete	Club	Reaction	Time	Notes
1st place, gold medalist(s)	5	Joanna Linkiewicz	KS AZS AWF Wrocław	0.248	56.32	SB
2nd place, silver medalist(s)	4	Julia Korzuch	AZS-AWF Katowice	0.196	57.12	PB
3rd place, bronze medalist(s)	6	Emilia Ankiewicz	AZS-AWF Warszawa	0.299	57.82	
4	3	Anna Maria Gryc	AZS-AWF Warszawa	0.412	57.82	PB
5	7	Agata Kołakowska	AZS-AWFiS Gdańsk	0.251	58.65	SB
6	1	Izabela Smolińska	RLTL Optima Radom	0.309	58.66	SB
7	8	Julia Sokołowska	AKL Ursynów Warszawa	0.191	60.74	
8	2	Alicja Kaczmarek	ALKS AJP Gorzów Wlkp.	0.255	61.60	

==== 3000 metres steeplechase ====
Rank	Lane	Athlete	Club	Time	Notes
1st place, gold medalist(s)	13	Aneta Konieczek	WMLKS Nadodrze Powodowo	9:25.98	PB
2nd place, silver medalist(s)	14	Alicja Konieczek	OŚ AZS Poznań	9:27.79	PB
3rd place, bronze medalist(s)	12	Kinga Królik	UKS Azymut Pabianice	9:41.80	PB
4	11	Matylda Kowal	CWKS Resovia Rzeszów	9:58.02	SB
5	2	Patrycja Kapała	AZS-AWF Katowice	10:17.88	
6	8	Emilia Mikszuta	SKLA Sopot	10:20.05	PB
7	3	Mariola Ślusarczyk	UKS Barnim Goleniów	10:23.72	
8	4	Julia Koralewska	CWZS Zawisza Bydgoszcz SL	10:26.04	PB
9	10	Klaudia Pawlus	WKS Śląsk Wrocław	10:35.86	
10	6	Patrycja Surowiec	CWKS Resovia Rzeszów	10:37.06	PB
11	7	Agnieszka Chorzępa	AZS-AWF Warszawa	10:41.05	PB
12	5	Katarzyna Główczewska	ULKS Talex Borzytuchom	10:46.40	PB
13	9	Milena Pyka	MKS-MOS Płomień Sosnowiec	10:56.20	
	1	Danuta Woszczek	UKS Olimp Kozienice	DNF	

==== 4 × 100 metres relay ====
Rank	Heat	Lane	Club	Competitors	Reaction	Time	Notes
1st place, gold medalist(s)	2	4	AZS-AWF Warszawa	Anna Maria Gryc; Ada Kołodziej; Justyna Paluch; Paulina Paluch	0.290	45.04	
2nd place, silver medalist(s)	2	8	CWZS Zawisza Bydgoszcz SL	Dominika Małkowska; Katarzyna Sokólska; Zuzanna Kogut; Marika Popowicz-Drapała	0.177	45.15	
3rd place, bronze medalist(s)	2	5	RLTL Optima Radom	Martyna Osińska; Natalia Wosztyl; Alicja Potasznik; Martyna Kotwiła	0.158	45.24	
4	2	6	KS AZS AWF Wrocław	Jagoda Mierzyńska; Adriana Gąsior; Weronika Chojka; Anna Pałys	0.177	45.93	
5	2	7	AZS-AWFiS Gdańsk	Lucyna Łoś; Monika Farasiewicz; Olga Pietrzak; Oliwia Strugińska	0.217	46.32	
6	1	4	LUKS Orkan Września	Wiktoria Dams; Martyna Guzowska; Marika Majewska; Marta Zimna	0.211	46.37	
7	1	5	KS AZS AWF Kraków	Magdalena Miękińska; Mariola Karaś; Martyna Konderak; Alicja Struzik	0.198	46.50	
8	1	6	KS Stal LA Ostrów Wlkp.	Ewa Piaszczyńska; Oliwia Klar; Dagmara Adamcio; Inga Kanicka	0.241	47.69	
9	1	3	MKS Agros Chełm	Wiktoria Wrońska; Paulina Zielińska; Sylwia Ciupek; Amelia Oleszczyńska	0.170	47.90	
	2	3	AZS-AWF Katowice	Magdalena Stefanowicz; Magdalena Brendel; Paulina Guzowska; Karolina Łozowska	0.183	DNF	

==== 4 × 400 metres relay ====
Rank	Lane	Club	Competitors	Reaction	Time	Notes
1st place, gold medalist(s)	5	AZS UMCS Lublin	Alicja Wrona; Wiktoria Drozd; Agata Wasiluk; Małgorzata Hołub-Kowalik	0.271	3:36.70	
2nd place, silver medalist(s)	7	RLTL Optima Radom	Izabela Smolińska; Martyna Kotwiła; Alicja Potasznik; Natalia Wosztyl	0.338	3:39.78	
3rd place, bronze medalist(s)	3	KS AZS AWF Kraków	Katarzyna Martyna; Aleksandra Wsołek; Margarita Koczanowa; Mariola Karaś	0.169	3:40.58	
4	4	SKLA Sopot	Blanka Zapora; Monika Kasica; Monika Pietroń; Aleksandra Formella	0.315	3:41.46	
	6	AZS-AWF Warszawa	Weronika Bartnowska; Weronika Wyka-Majecka; Emilia Ankiewicz; Anna Maria Gryc		DNS	

==== 5,000 metres walk ====
Rank	Lane	Athlete	Club	Time	Notes
1st place, gold medalist(s)	3	Agnieszka Ellward	WKS Flota Gdynia	24:01.24	
2nd place, silver medalist(s)	1	Anna Zdziebło	LKS Stal Mielec	24:20.26	PB
3rd place, bronze medalist(s)	7	Magdalena Żelazna	AZS-AWF Gorzów	24:25.82	
4	2	Antonina Lorek	KS AZS AWF Kraków	24:29.07	PB
5	4	Małgorzata Cetnarska	KKS Victoria Stalowa Wola	26:25.96	SB
6	5	Patrycja Oller	MLKS Nadwiślanin Chełmno	26:59.61	
7	6	Marcelina Drozdek	AZS-AWF Warszawa	27:52.73	

==== High jump ====
Rank	Athlete	Club	1.56	1.61	1.66	1.70	1.73	1.76	1.79	1.82	1.85	1.88	1.90	1.92	1.94	1.96	Height	Notes
1st place, gold medalist(s)	Kamila Lićwinko	KS Podlasie Białystok	—	—	—	o	—	xo	—	o	o	o	—	o	—	xxx	1.92	
2nd place, silver medalist(s)	Wiktoria Miąso	CWKS Resovia Rzeszów	—	—	—	o	—	o	xxo	o	xo	xxx					1.85	PB
3rd place, bronze medalist(s)	Aneta Rydz	RLTL Optima Radom	—	—	—	o	o	o	xo	xxo	xxx						1.82	
4	Paulina Borys	SKLA Sopot	—	—	—	o	o	xo	xo	xxo	xxx						1.82	SB
5	Maja Słodzińska	MKS Kusy Szczecin	xo	o	o	xxo	o	xo	xxx								1.76	PB
6	Katarzyna Kokot	AZS KU Politechniki Opolskiej Opole	—	o	o	xo	xxo	xxo	xxx								1.76	
7	Paulina Wal	AZS KU Politechniki Opolskiej Opole	—	o	xo	o	o	xxx									1.73	SB
8	Patrycja Skoczylas	RKS Łódź	—	o	o	o	xxo	xxx									1.73	SB
9	Hanna Grabowska	AML Słupsk	—	o	o	xxo	xxx										1.70	
9	Weronika Kaźmierczak	RKS Łódź	—	o	o	xxo	xxx										1.70	=SB
11	Alicja Wysocka	KS Orzeł Warszawa	—	o	o	xxx											1.66	
12	Milena Patejuk	AML Słupsk	o	xxo	o	xxx											1.66	
13	Urszula Szczuko	STS Pomerania Szczecin	o	o	xxo	xxx											1.66	
14	Adrianna Litwin	AML Słupsk	o	xxo	xxx												1.61	

==== Pole vault ====
Rank	Athlete	Club	3.20	3.40	3.60	3.80	3.90	4.00	4.10	4.21	Height	Notes
1st place, gold medalist(s)	Kamila Przybyła	CWZS Zawisza Bydgoszcz SL	—	—	—	—	—	xxo	o	xxx	4.10	SB
2nd place, silver medalist(s)	Emilia Kusy	SKLA Sopot	—	—	o	o	o	o	xxx		4.00	SB
3rd place, bronze medalist(s)	Anna Łyko	KS AZS AWF Wrocław	—	—	—	o	o	xo	xxx		4.00	
4	Agnieszka Kaszuba	KL Gdynia	—	—	o	o	o	xxo	xxx		4.00	SB
5	Victoria Kalitta	CWZS Zawisza Bydgoszcz SL	—	—	—	—	o	xxx			3.90	
6	Maja Chamot	MKS Ustroń	—	—	xo	o	xxx				3.80	
7	Milena Lipińska	Ośrodek Skoku o Tyczce Gdańsk	—	o	o	xo	xxx				3.80	SB
8	Zofia Jóźwiak	RKS Łódź	—	o	o	xxx					3.60	
8	Kinga Górny	MKS Ustroń	—	—	o	xxx					3.60	
8	Valentyna Iakovenko	AZS-AWFiS Gdańsk	—	—	o	xxx					3.60	
11	Dominika Brykała	UKS OSoT Szczecin	o	o	xxx						3.40	
12	Malwina Plak	RKS Łódź	xo	o	xxx						3.40	
13	Ada Szczygieł	UKS OSoT Szczecin	o	xo	xxx						3.40	
	Agata Boraczyńska	KS Warszawianka W-wa									DNS	

==== Long jump ====
Rank	Athlete	Club	1	2	3	4	5	6	Distance	Notes
1st place, gold medalist(s)	Adrianna Szóstak	OŚ AZS Poznań	x	6.21	x	6.08	6.29	6.39	6.39	PB
2nd place, silver medalist(s)	Anna Matuszewicz	MKL Toruń	6.23	5.04	6.33	6.01	6.17	x	6.33	
3rd place, bronze medalist(s)	Karolina Kucharczyk	MUKS Kadet Rawicz	6.04	6.11	6.11	5.80	6.22	6.24	6.24	PB
4	Karolina Młodawska	KKL Kielce	6.22	6.23	6.23	x	x	6.17	6.23	SB
5	Roksana Jędraszak	MKL Jarocin	6.17	4.77	x	x	6.03	6.16	6.17	
6	Natalia Benedykcińska	KS Stal LA Ostrów Wlkp.	5.90	5.92	6.04	5.80	x	5.95	6.04	SB
7	Angelika Faka	WKS Wawel Kraków	6.03	x	5.96	5.82	5.93	x	6.03	
8	Sandra Sikorska	AZS-AWF Warszawa	5.92	5.67	5.80	5.83	5.83	5.70	5.92	
9	Weronika Strączek	KS AZS AWF Wrocław	5.81	5.64	x				5.81	PB
10	Julia Adamczyk	RLTL Optima Radom	5.64	5.80	x				5.80	
11	Julia Frąckowiak	MCKiS Jaworzno	5.78	x	x				5.78	
12	Małgorzata Jóźwicka	AZS-AWF Warszawa	5.75	5.76	x				5.76	
13	Katarzyna Bargielska	KS AZS-AWF Biała Podlaska	5.71	x	x				5.71	
14	Agata Stypułkowska	KS AZS-AWF Biała Podlaska	5.26	5.32	5.65				5.65	
15	Weronika Klimacka	OŚ AZS Poznań	5.37	5.49	5.61				5.61	
	Ada Kołodziej	AZS-AWF Warszawa							DNS	

==== Triple jump ====
Rank	Athlete	Club	1	2	3	4	5	6	Distance	Notes
1st place, gold medalist(s)	Adrianna Szóstak	OŚ AZS Poznań	13.46	13.52	13.57	12.04	13.92	x	13.92	
2nd place, silver medalist(s)	Karolina Młodawska	KKL Kielce	12.94	13.18	13.37	13.39	13.60	13.43	13.60	PB
3rd place, bronze medalist(s)	Agnieszka Bednarek	AZS Łódź	x	13.12	13.04	13.44	13.37	13.33	13.44	
4	Paulina Szablewska	RKS Łódź	12.89	12.75	x	12.63	x	12.42	12.89	SB
5	Aleksandra Nowakowska	RKS Łódź	12.60	12.74	12.51	x	12.85	x	12.85	PB
6	Joanna Mosiek	MUKS Kadet Rawicz	12.81	12.60	12.63	11.08	12.77	12.69	12.81	
7	Natalia Mach	AZS-AWF Katowice	x	x	12.78	x	12.35	12.69	12.78	
8	Zuzanna Sztachańska	AZS Łódź	12.72	x	12.14	x	x	12.43	12.72	=SB
9	Karolina Kucharczyk	MUKS Kadet Rawicz	12.10	12.57	12.16				12.57	PB
10	Anna Dworak	KS AZS AWF Wrocław	x	x	12.33				12.33	
11	Nicole Kraska	CWZS Zawisza Bydgoszcz SL	12.23	x	12.27				12.27	
12	Patrycja Twardowska	MUKS Kadet Rawicz	x	12.00	x				12.00	
13	Katarzyna Bargielska	KS AZS-AWF Biała Podlaska	11.62	11.77	11.50				11.77	SB
14	Zuzanna Różańska	AZS-AWF Warszawa	x	11.14	11.55				11.55	
	Anna Stasiak	WKS Wawel Kraków	x	x	x				NM	

==== Shot put ====
Rank	Athlete	Club	1	2	3	4	5	6	Distance	Notes
1st place, gold medalist(s)	Paulina Guba	AZS UMCS Lublin	17.74	x	x	17.91	18.29	18.09	18.29	SB
2nd place, silver medalist(s)	Klaudia Kardasz	KS Podlasie Białystok	17.20	17.33	x	16.85	x	x	17.33	
3rd place, bronze medalist(s)	Maja Ślepowrońska	AZS-AWF Warszawa	16.39	x	x	16.51	17.16	x	17.16	PB
4	Agnieszka Maluśkiewicz	OŚ AZS Poznań	15.96	15.81	x	x	16.45	15.87	16.45	
5	Ewa Różańska	AZS-AWF Warszawa	x	14.43	14.92	x	x	14.81	14.92	
6	Beata Trzonkowska	KS Prefbet-Sonarol	12.60	x	13.36	12.75	x	13.28	13.36	
7	Patrycja Banach	CWZS Zawisza Bydgoszcz SL	12.86	12.25	12.75	12.47	12.87	13.15	13.15	SB
8	Michalina Wróblewska	AZS-AWFiS Gdańsk	12.39	12.82	12.42	x	12.51	12.81	12.82	PB
	Katarzyna Sękowska	KS Lider Grodzisk Mazowiecki							DNS	

==== Discus throw ====
Rank	Athlete	Club	1	2	3	4	5	6	Distance	Notes
1st place, gold medalist(s)	Daria Zabawska	AZS UMCS Lublin	57.90	57.52	56.32	x	55.64	x	57.90	
2nd place, silver medalist(s)	Karolina Urban	AZS-AWFiS Gdańsk	55.05	57.06	55.67	57.86	56.55	x	57.86	PB
3rd place, bronze medalist(s)	Karolina Sygutowska	ZLKL Zielona Góra	49.26	49.56	x	x	52.04	47.84	52.04	
4	Nina Staruch	AZS-AWF Warszawa	x	x	46.37	x	50.73	x	50.73	
5	Weronika Muszyńska	AZS UMCS Lublin	47.62	47.90	x	49.77	x	47.82	49.77	
6	Ewa Różańska	AZS-AWF Warszawa	48.33	x	x	x	x	x	48.33	
7	Beata Trzonkowska	KS Prefbet-Sonarol	47.21	x	46.56	44.68	x	47.92	47.92	
8	Julia Chycińska	UKS 55 Łódź	42.83	45.31	x	x	x	42.51	45.31	
9	Martyna Dobrowolska	AZS-AWFiS Gdańsk	x	44.38	41.16				44.38	
10	Martyna Tymińska	AZS-AWF Katowice	x	39.70	40.77				40.77	
11	Katarzyna Zaraś	UKS 12 Kalisz	37.72	38.58	35.81				38.58	
	Alicja Gajewska	AZS-AWFiS Gdańsk	x	x	x				NM	

==== Hammer throw ====
Rank	Athlete	Club	1	2	3	4	5	6	Distance	Notes
1st place, gold medalist(s)	Malwina Kopron	AZS UMCS Lublin	74.78	73.47	75.42	x	71.22	x	75.42	SB
2nd place, silver medalist(s)	Anita Włodarczyk	AZS-AWF Katowice	67.97	71.14	x	69.64	72.14	74.06	74.06	SB
3rd place, bronze medalist(s)	Joanna Fiodorow	OŚ AZS Poznań	x	71.58	72.31	x	x	70.71	72.31	
4	Katarzyna Furmanek	KKL Kielce	69.73	69.37	x	67.91	68.27	69.73	69.73	
5	Aleksandra Śmiech	KS Agros Zamość	65.68	62.29	64.05	x	x	66.13	66.13	
6	Marika Kaczmarek	KKL Kielce	63.85	64.34	64.15	62.89	65.51	64.47	65.51	
7	Ewa Różańska	AZS-AWF Warszawa	58.04	x	61.34	58.92	58.43	62.60	62.60	
8	Aleksandra Kokowska	OŚ AZS Poznań	59.23	54.70	58.37	x	61.11	60.59	61.11	SB
9	Kinga Łepkowska	AZS-AWF Warszawa	58.23	58.60	x				58.60	
10	Aleksandra Nowaczewska	LUKS Start Nakło	57.58	58.05	x				58.05	
11	Zuzanna Kniat	LUKS Orkan Września	45.42	47.35	x				47.35	
	Gabriela Jagiełka	LLKS Pomorze Stargard	x	x	x				NM	

==== Javelin throw ====
Rank	Athlete	Club	1	2	3	4	5	6	Distance	Notes
1st place, gold medalist(s)	Maria Andrejczyk	LUKS Hańcza Suwałki	x	55.53	59.69	57.67	57.99	x	59.69	
2nd place, silver medalist(s)	Klaudia Regin	LKS Jantar Ustka	46.70	x	50.20	49.02	54.87	x	54.87	
3rd place, bronze medalist(s)	Karolina Bołdysz	AZS-AWFiS Gdańsk	x	50.53	50.50	51.73	50.28	x	51.73	SB
4	Małgorzata Maślak	ULKS Tychowo	47.44	x	46.71	47.21	47.51	50.80	50.80	
5	Gabriela Andrukonis	UKS Czwórka Białystok	x	45.57	46.52	48.79	46.17	50.62	50.62	
6	Joanna Hajdrowska	RLTL Optima Radom	44.76	x	47.03	49.46	x	45.29	49.46	
7	Julia Szałas	AZS-AWF Gorzów	46.51	43.27	46.00	43.79	43.68	x	46.51	
8	Julia Chuda	KS AZS AWF Wrocław	43.21	45.27	43.90	44.28	44.09	x	45.27	SB
9	Beata Skraba	KS AZS AWF Kraków	42.27	43.77	43.81				43.81	
10	Aleksandra Bednarek	AZS-AWF Katowice	37.51	43.26	42.63				43.26	SB
11	Natalia Mądrzejewska	AZS-AWFiS Gdańsk	36.74	x	36.87				36.87	
