= 2021 European Athletics Team Championships Super League =

Athletics team competitions

- Host city: (Poland) Chorzów, Silesia
- Events: 40 (20 men, 20 women)
- Dates: 29–30 May
- Main venue: Silesian Stadium

The 2021 European Athletics Team Championships Super League have been held in Chorzów, Poland from 29 to 30 May 2021.

== Results ==
There were 40 events (20 men and 20 women). 36 individual and 4 relay races.

== Men's ==
=== 100 metres ===
29 May; Wind: -0.5 m/s

Rank	Lane	Name	Nationality	Time	Notes	Points
1	4	Mouhamadou Fall	France	10.28		7
2	5	Lorenzo Patta	Italy	10.29		6
3	7	Lucas Ansah-Peprah	Germany	10.35		5
4	6	Przemysław Słowikowski	Poland	10.42		4
5	2	Ojie Edoburun	Great Britain	10.46		3
6	3	Diogo Antunes	Portugal	10.48		2
7	8	Sergio López	Spain	10.50		1

=== 200 metres ===
30 May; Wind: -1.0 m/s

Rank	Lane	Name	Nationality	Time	Notes	Points
1	3	Fausto Desalu	Italy	20.48		7
2	8	Jesús Gómez	Spain	20.87	=PB	6
3	4	Owen Ansah	Germany	20.96		5
4	7	Andrew Morgan-Harrison	Great Britain	21.05		4
5	5	Ryan Zeze	France	21.06		3
6	6	Karol Zalewski	Poland	21.19		2
7	2	Delvis Santos	Portugal	21.69		1

=== 400 metres ===
29 May

Rank	Lane	Name	Nationality	Time	Notes	Points
1	7	Thomas Jordier	France	45.65	SB	7
2	4	Cameron Chalmers	Great Britain	45.89	SB	6
3	3	Davide Re	Italy	45.90		5
4	5	Samuel García	Spain	46.31		4
5	8	Marvin Schlegel	Germany	46.73	SB	3
6	6	Mauro Pereira	Portugal	47.16		2
7	2	Dariusz Kowaluk	Poland	47.28		1

=== 800 metres ===
30 May

Rank	Name	Nationality	Time	Notes	Points
1	Jake Wightman	Great Britain	1:45.71		7
2	Mariano García	Spain	1:46.45		6
3	Mateusz Borkowski	Poland	1:46.66		5
4	Simone Barontini	Italy	1:47.12	SB	4
5	Nasredine Khatir	France	1:47.74		2.5
5	Marc Reuther	Germany	1:47.74		2.5
7	Nuno Pereira	Portugal	1:48.13	PB	1

=== 1500 metres ===
29 May

Rank	Name	Nationality	Time	Notes	Points
1	Robert Farken	Germany	3:56.64		7
2	Jesús Gómez	Spain	3:56.79		6
3	Michał Rozmys	Poland	3:57.13		5
4	Archie Davis	Great Britain	3:57.89		4
5	Isaac Nader	Portugal	3:58.50		3
6	Matteo Guelfo	Italy	3:59.24		2
7	Jimmy Gressier	France	3:59.37		1

=== 3000 metres ===
30 May

Rank	Name	Nationality	Time	Notes	Points
1	Isaac Nader	Portugal	8:31.26		7
2	Yann Schrub	France	8:31.82		6
3	Adel Mechaal	Spain	8:32.08		5
4	Yassin Bouih	Italy	8:32.68		4
5	Thomas Anderson	Great Britain	8:34.84		3
6	Patryk Kozłowski	Poland	8:38.95		2
7	Martin Grau	Germany	8:41.96		1

=== 5000 metres ===
29 May

Rank	Name	Nationality	Time	Notes	Points
1	Yemaneberhan Crippa	Italy	13:17.23	CR	7
2	Hugo Hay	France	13:17.95	PB	6
3	Carlos Mayo	Spain	13:18.15	PB	5
4	Thomas Mortimer	Great Britain	13:28.12	EU23L	4
5	Maximilian Thorwith	Germany	13:46.27		3
6	Samuel Barata	Portugal	13:51.94		2
7	Aleksander Wiącek	Poland	14:20.37	SB	1

=== 110 metres hurdles ===
30 May; Wind: -0.3 m/s

Rank	Lane	Name	Nationality	Time	Notes	Points
1	4	Asier Martínez	Spain	13.43		7
2	6	David King	Great Britain	13.63		6
3	3	Damian Czykier	Poland	13.65		5
4	8	Lorenzo Perini	Italy	13.71		4
5	5	Just Kwaou-Mathey	France	13.75		3
6	2	Abdel Kader Larrinaga	Portugal	13.81		2
7	7	Erik Balnuweit	Germany	13.83		1

=== 400 metres hurdles ===
29 May

Rank	Lane	Name	Nationality	Time	Notes	Points
1	5	Alessandro Sibilio	Italy	49.70		7
2	7	Alastair Chalmers	Great Britain	49.95	SB	6
3	3	Ludvy Vaillant	France	50.76		5
4	4	Emil Agyekum	Germany	51.07		4
5	2	Jesús David Delgado	Spain	51.11		3
6	6	Patryk Dobek	Poland	51.12		2
7	8	Diogo Mestre	Portugal	54.30		1

=== 3000 metres steeplechase ===
30 May

Rank	Name	Nationality	Time	Notes	Points
1	Fernando Carro	Spain	8:39.67		7
2	Mehdi Belhadj	France	8:40.03		6
3	Osama Zoghlami	Italy	8:40.41		5
4	Krystian Zalewski	Poland	8:40.57		4
5	Karl Bebendorf	Germany	8:40.93		3
6	Phil Norman	Great Britain	8:42.78		2
7	Etson Barros	Portugal	8:53.72		1

=== 4 × 100 metres relay ===
29 May

Rank	Lane	Nation	Athletes	Time	Notes	Points
1	6	Germany	Lucas Ansah-Peprah, Owen Ansah, Niels Torben Giese, Marvin Schulte	38.73		7
2	7	Spain	Arnau Monné, Pol Retamal, Jesús Gómez, Sergio López	39.07	SB	6
3	8	France	Marvin René, Ryan Zeze, Méba-Mickaël Zeze, Amaury Golitin	39.12		5
4	5	Poland	Mateusz Siuda, Dominik Kopeć, Adrian Brzeziński, Przemysław Słowikowski	39.16	SB	4
5	4	Italy	Federico Cattaneo, Fausto Desalu, Davide Manenti, Lorenzo Patta	39.28		3
6	3	Great Britain	Jona Efoloko, Ojie Edoburun, Samuel Gordon, Joel Fearon	39.39		2
7	2	Portugal	Delvis Santos, Diogo Antunes, Rafael Jorge, Carlos Nascimento	39.88	SB	1

=== 4 × 400 metres relay ===
30 May

Rank	Lane	Nation	Athletes	Time	Notes	Points
1	6	Italy	Davide Re, Alessandro Sibilio, Edoardo Scotti, Vladimir Aceti	3:02.64	EL	7
2	7	Spain	Samuel García, Lucas Búa, Manuel Guijarro, Bernat Erta	3:03.10	SB	6
3	5	Poland	Wiktor Suwara, Kajetan Duszyński, Patryk Grzegorzewicz, Karol Zalewski	3:03.43	SB	5
4	8	France	Ludvy Vaillant, Muhammad Abdallah Kounta, Gilles Biron, Thomas Jordier	3:03.59	SB	4
5	3	Germany	Marvin Schlegel, Tobias Lange, Jean Paul Bredau, Manuel Sanders	3:03.63	SB	3
6	2	Portugal	João Coelho, Ericsson Tavares, Mauro Pereira, Raidel Acea	3:09.82	SB	2
	4	Great Britain	Cameron Chalmers, Alex Haydock-Wilson, Michael Ohioze, Rabah Yousif	DNF		0

=== High jump ===
29 May

Rank	Name	Nationality	2.00	2.10	2.16	2.20	2.24	2.28	Result	Notes	Points
1	Norbert Kobielski	Poland	–	o	o	o	o	xxx	2.24	=SB	7
2	William Grimsey	Great Britain	o	o	xo	o	o	xxx	2.24		6
3	Falk Wendrich	Germany	o	o	xo	xo	xxx		2.20	=SB	5
4	Sébastien Micheau	France	–	o	xo	xxx			2.16	=SB	4
5	Victor Korst	Portugal	o	o	xxx				2.10		2.5
5	Ángel Torrero	Spain	o	o	xxx				2.10		2.5
	Gianmarco Tamberi	Italy	Did not start								0

=== Pole vault ===
30 May

Rank	Name	Nationality	5.00	5.20	5.40	5.55	5.65	5.70	Result	Notes	Points
1	Robert Sobera	Poland	–	o	o	xo	xxo	xxx	5.65	SB	7
2	Harry Coppell	Great Britain	–	–	xo	o	xxx		5.55	SB	6
3	Oleg Zernikel	Germany	–	–	o	xxo	xx		5.55		5
4	Matteo Capello	Italy	o	o	o	xxx			5.40		4
5	Isidro Leyva	Spain	o	o	xo	xxx			5.40		3
6	Diogo Ferreira	Portugal	xxo	o	xx				5.20		2
7	Valentin Lavillenie	France	o	xo	xxx				5.20		1

=== Long jump ===
29 May

Rank	Name	Nationality	#1	#2	#3	#4	Result	Notes	Points
1	Filippo Randazzo	Italy	7.88	x	7.82	x	7.88		7
2	Fabian Heinle	Germany	7.69	x	7.82	x	7.82	SB	6
3	Augustin Bey	France	7.75	x	x	x	7.75		4.5
3	Eusebio Cáceres	Spain	x	7.75	x	x	7.75		4.5
5	Reynold Banigo	Great Britain	x	7.37	7.56		7.56		3
6	Mateusz Różański	Poland	x	7.46	7.46		7.46		2
7	Ivo Tavares	Portugal	7.14	7.25	7.27		7.27		1

=== Triple jump ===
30 May

Rank	Name	Nationality	#1	#2	#3	#4	Result	Notes	Points
1	Max Heß	Germany	16.75	x	x	17.13	17.13	EL	7
2	Pedro Pichardo	Portugal	17.01	x	x	x	17.01		6
3	Pablo Torrijos	Spain	16.90	16.68	16.74	16.93	16.93	SB	5
4	Tobia Bocchi	Italy	16.42	16.62	x	x	16.62		4
5	Melvin Raffin	France	16.48	16.38	16.30		16.48		3
6	Nathan Douglas	Great Britain	x	15.68	15.88		15.88		2
7	Adrian Świderski	Poland	15.54	x	x		15.54		1

=== Shot put ===
29 May

Rank	Name	Nationality	#1	#2	#3	#4	Result	Notes	Points
1	Michał Haratyk	Poland	20.94	21.18	21.34	x	21.34		7
2	Leonardo Fabbri	Italy	19.34	20.16	20.77	19.95	20.77	SB	6
3	Scott Lincoln	Great Britain	20.00	19.81	x	19.59	20.00		5
4	Simon Bayer	Germany	x	19.73	19.89	x	19.89		4
5	Carlos Tobalina	Spain	18.91	19.27	18.84		19.27		3
6	Francisco Belo	Portugal	x	18.88	18.75		18.88		2
7	Frédéric Dagée	France	18.56	x	x		18.56		1

=== Discus throw ===
30 May

Rank	Name	Nationality	#1	#2	#3	#4	Result	Notes	Points
1	Lawrence Okoye	Great Britain	62.98	x	x	64.22	64.22		7
2	Robert Urbanek	Poland	60.13	61.17	62.57	62.37	62.57		6
3	David Wrobel	Germany	61.52	x	x	60.44	61.52		5
4	Giovanni Faloci	Italy	57.53	58.51	59.65	58.17	59.65		4
5	Lois Maikel Martínez	Spain	x	57.73	x		57.73		3
6	Edujose Sousa Lima	Portugal	51.59	51.68	51.73		51.73		2
	Lolassonn Djouhan	France	x	x	x		NM		0

=== Hammer throw ===
30 May

Rank	Name	Nationality	#1	#2	#3	#4	Result	Notes	Points
1	Paweł Fajdek	Poland	76.90	79.64	82.98	r	82.98	CR	7
2	Javier Cienfuegos	Spain	74.48	76.98	x	77.11	77.11	SB	6
3	Quentin Bigot	France	73.26	74.04	76.75	76.41	76.75		5
4	Chris Bennett	Great Britain	68.75	72.62	72.73	74.09	74.09		4
5	Simone Falloni	Italy	70.06	72.04	72.25		72.25		3
6	Tristan Schwandke	Germany	71.93	72.17	x		72.17		2
7	Rúben Antunes	Portugal	x	68.15	x		68.15		1

=== Javelin throw ===
29 May

Rank	Name	Nationality	#1	#2	#3	#4	Result	Notes	Points
1	Johannes Vetter	Germany	94.24	96.29	r		96.29	CR	7
2	Marcin Krukowski	Poland	85.12	80.32	–	x	85.12	SB	6
3	Odei Jainaga	Spain	78.05	81.92	84.80	82.85	84.80	NR	5
4	Roberto Orlando	Italy	x	71.01	76.51	72.04	76.51		4
5	Leandro Ramos	Portugal	72.12	x	76.18		76.18		3
6	Rémi Conroy	France	65.91	68.78	73.29		73.29	SB	2
7	Daniel Bainbridge	Great Britain	72.12	68.43	x		72.12		1

== Women's ==
=== 100 metres ===
29 May; Wind: +1.3 m/s

Rank	Lane	Name	Nationality	Time	Notes	Points
1	2	Pia Skrzyszowska	Poland	11.25	EU23L	7
2	3	Lisa Mayer	Germany	11.27		6
3	4	Imani-Lara Lansiquot	Great Britain	11.27		5
4	7	Orlann Ombissa-Dzangue	France	11.33		4
5	8	Maria Isabel Pérez	Spain	11.36		3
6	6	Gloria Hooper	Italy	11.44		2
7	5	Lorène Bazolo	Portugal	11.45		1

=== 200 metres ===
30 May; Wind: +0.6 m/s

Rank	Lane	Name	Nationality	Time	Notes	Points
1	3	Beth Dobbin	Great Britain	22.78	SB	7
2	6	Dalia Kaddari	Italy	22.89	EU23L	6
3	5	Rebekka Haase	Germany	23.00		5
4	7	Marlena Gola	Poland	23.33	PB	4
5	8	Wided Atatou	France	23.37	SB	3
6	4	Lorène Bazolo	Portugal	23.45		2
7	2	Paula Sevilla	Spain	24.03		1

=== 400 metres ===
29 May

Rank	Lane	Name	Nationality	Time	Notes	Points
1	6	Natalia Kaczmarek	Poland	51.36		7
2	8	Aauri Bokesa	Spain	52.22		6
3	5	Corinna Schwab	Germany	52.72		5
4	3	Cátia Azevedo	Portugal	52.99		4
5	4	Yasmin Liverpool	Great Britain	53.02		3
6	2	Alice Mangione	Italy	53.08		2
7	7	Floria Gueï	France	53.17		1

=== 800 metres ===
29 May

Rank	Name	Nationality	Time	Notes	Points
1	Ellie Baker	Great Britain	2:00.95		7
2	Elena Bellò	Italy	2:02.06	SB	6
3	Angelika Sarna	Poland	2:02.54	SB	5
4	Léna Kandissounon	France	2:02.75	PB	4
5	Esther Guerrero	Spain	2:03.14		3
6	Salomé Afonso	Portugal	2:04.04	PB	2
	Christina Hering	Germany	DQ	TR17.2.2	0

=== 1500 metres ===
30 May

Rank	Name	Nationality	Time	Notes	Points
1	Gaia Sabbatini	Italy	4:14.87		7
2	Salomé Afonso	Portugal	4:15.08	SB	6
3	Marta Pérez	Spain	4:15.24		5
4	Erin Wallace	Great Britain	4:15.65		4
5	Bérénice Cleyet-Merle	France	4:15.96		3
6	Renata Pliś	Poland	4:19.10	SB	2
7	Majtie Kolberg	Germany	4:24.76		1

=== 3000 metres ===
29 May

Rank	Name	Nationality	Time	Notes	Points
1	Revee Walcott-Nolan	Great Britain	9:13.36	PB	7
2	Lucía Rodríguez	Spain	9:14.45	PB	6
3	Vera Coutellier	Germany	9:15.27		5
4	Renata Pliś	Poland	9:16.10		4
5	Micol Majori	Italy	9:17.53	PB	3
6	Manon Trapp	France	9:22.85		2
7	Lia Lemos	Portugal	9:33.31		1

=== 5000 metres ===
30 May

Rank	Name	Nationality	Time	Notes	Points
1	Nadia Battocletti	Italy	15:46.95		7
2	Blanca Fernández	Spain	15:51.44		6
3	Denise Krebs	Germany	15:53.09	SB	5
4	Aude Korotchansky	France	15:56.55		4
5	Beth Kidger	Great Britain	15:59.93		3
6	Susana Francisco	Portugal	16:27.66	SB	2
7	Sylwia Indeka	Poland	16:58.07		1

=== 100 metres hurdles ===
30 May; Wind: -0.1 m/s

Rank	Lane	Name	Nationality	Time	Notes	Points
1	5	Pia Skrzyszowska	Poland	12.99		7
2	4	Luminosa Bogliolo	Italy	13.05		6
3	6	Teresa Errandonea	Spain	13.24		5
4	3	Anne Weigold	Germany	13.32		4
5	2	Laeticia Bapte	France	13.39		3
6	8	Alicia Barrett	Great Britain	13.42	SB	2
7	7	Olimpia Barbosa	Portugal	13.75		1

=== 400 metres hurdles ===
29 May

Rank	Lane	Name	Nationality	Time	Notes	Points
1	4	Lina Nielsen	Great Britain	55.59		7
2	6	Carolina Krafzik	Germany	55.71	SB	6
3	5	Linda Olivieri	Italy	56.17	SB	5
4	7	Sara Gallego	Spain	56.83	PB	4
5	8	Joanna Linkiewicz	Poland	57.54	SB	3
6	2	Vera Barbosa	Portugal	57.78		2
7	8	Aurélie Chaboudez	France	58.18		1

=== 3000 metres steeplechase ===
29 May

Rank	Name	Nationality	Time	Notes	Points
1	Alicja Konieczek	Poland	9:35.63		7
2	Elena Burkard	Germany	9:36.04		6
3	Irene Sánchez-Escribano	Spain	9:41.44		5
4	Martina Merlo	Italy	9:43.42		4
5	Claire Palou	France	9:55.40	PB	3
6	Joana Soares	Portugal	9:58.63		2
7	Maisie Grice	Great Britain	10:18.49		1

=== 4 × 100 metres relay ===
29 May

Rank	Lane	Nation	Athletes	Time	Notes	Points
1	5	Great Britain	Beth Dobbin, Imani-Lara Lansiquot, Bianca Williams, Desirèe Henry	43.36		7
2	6	Poland	Marika Popowicz-Drapała, Klaudia Adamek, Katarzyna Sokólska, Marlena Gola	43.83		6
3	7	France	Wided Atatou, Orlann Ombissa-Dzangue, Maroussia Paré, Eva Berger	43.91		5
4	2	Portugal	Patrícia Rodrigues, Rosalina Santos, Catarina Lourenço, Lorène Bazolo	44.92		4
5	4	Italy	Irene Siragusa, Gloria Hooper, Anna Bongiorni, Vittoria Fontana	46.51		3
	3	Germany	Jennifer Montag, Lisa Mayer, Rebekka Haase, Lisa Nippgen	DNF		0
	8	Spain	Carmen Marco, Jaël Bestué, Paula Sevilla, Aitana Rodrigo	DQ	TR24.7	0

=== 4 × 400 metres relay ===
30 May

Rank	Lane	Nation	Athletes	Time	Notes	Points
1	5	Poland	Małgorzata Hołub-Kowalik, Kornelia Lesiewicz, Justyna Święty-Ersetic, Natalia Kaczmarek	3:26.37	EL	7
2	4	Great Britain	Ama Pipi, Hannah Williams, Yasmin Liverpool, Lina Nielsen	3:27.16		6
3	3	Italy	Alice Mangione, Eleonora Marchiando, Petra Nardelli, Raphaela Lukudo	3:29.05		5
4	7	Germany	Laura Müller, Corinna Schwab, Nadine Gonska, Ruth Sophia Spelmeyer-Preuß	3:29.55		4
5	6	Spain	Andrea Jiménez, Laura Bueno, Bárbara Camblor, Aauri Bokesa	3:31.54		3
6	2	Portugal	Rivinilda Mentai, Juliana Guerreiro, Cátia Azevedo, Dorothé Évora	3:35.37		2
	8	France	Sokhna Lacoste, Amandine Brossier, Shana Grebo, Floria Gueï	DQ	TR16.8	0

=== High jump ===
30 May

Rank	Name	Nationality	1.68	1.75	1.81	1.85	1.88	1.91	1.94	1.96	Result	Notes	Points
1	Kamila Lićwinko	Poland	–	–	o	o	o	o	xo	xxx	1.94	=SB	7
2	Alessia Trost	Italy	–	o	o	o	o	o	xx–	x	1.91	SB	6
3	Emily Borthwick	Great Britain	–	o	o	o	o	xxx			1.88		5
4	Imke Onnen	Germany	–	xo	o	xo	o	xx			1.88	=SB	4
5	Solène Gicquel	France	–	o	o	o	xxx				1.85	SB	3
6	Claudia Conte	Spain	xo	o	o	o	xxx				1.85	SB	2
7	Anabela Neto	Portugal	o	o	xo	xxx					1.81	SB	1

=== Pole vault ===
29 May

Rank	Name	Nationality	3.90	4.10	4.25	4.35	4.45	4.55	Result	Notes	Points
1	Roberta Bruni	Italy	–	o	o	o	o	r	4.45		7
2	Malen Ruiz de Azua	Spain	xo	o	xo	xo	x		4.35		6
3	Molly Caudery	Great Britain	–	o	xo	xxo	x		4.35	SB	5
4	Margot Chevrier	France	–	o	o	xx–	x		4.25	SB	4
5	Marta Onofre	Portugal	o	xxx					3.90		3
6	Stefanie Berndörfer	Germany	xo	xxx					3.90		1.5
6	Victoria Kalitta	Poland	xo	xxx					3.90		1.5

=== Long jump ===
30 May

Rank	Name	Nationality	#1	#2	#3	#4	Result	Notes	Points
1	Maryse Luzolo	Germany	6.35	6.61	6.49	6.60	6.61	=PB	7
2	Magdalena Żebrowska	Poland	6.16	6.55	6.12	x	6.55	PB	6
3	María Vicente	Spain	6.42	6.39	6.16	6.29	6.42		5
4	Laura Strati	Italy	6.23	6.26	6.38	6.22	6.38		4
5	Evelise Veiga	Portugal	6.10	6.13	6.17		6.17		3
6	Lucy Hadaway	Great Britain	6.16	x	x		6.16		2
	Hilary Kpatcha	France	Did not start						0

=== Triple jump ===
29 May

Rank	Name	Nationality	#1	#2	#3	#4	Result	Notes	Points
1	Rouguy Diallo	France	14.12	13.90	x	13.99	14.12		7
2	Naomi Ogbeta	Great Britain	14.01	13.85	13.58	13.74	14.01		6
3	Adrianna Szóstak	Poland	13.96	13.86	13.65	13.84	13.96	PB	5
4	Neele Eckhardt	Germany	13.89	13.95	x	13.63	13.95		4
5	Ana Peleteiro	Spain	13.88	13.87	13.91		13.91		3
6	Patrícia Mamona	Portugal	13.89	13.83	13.68		13.89		2
7	Dariya Derkach	Italy	13.31	13.47	13.88		13.88		1

=== Shot put ===
30 May

Rank	Name	Nationality	#1	#2	#3	#4	Result	Notes	Points
1	Sara Gambetta	Germany	18.67	18.34	18.75	17.86	18.75		7
2	Auriol Dongmo	Portugal	18.54	18.50	18.74	18.33	18.74		6
3	Klaudia Kardasz	Poland	16.17	x	18.17	18.07	18.17	SB	5
4	Sophie McKinna	Great Britain	17.33	17.59	17.81	17.87	17.87		4
5	María Belén Toimil	Spain	x	16.02	17.07		17.07	SB	3
6	Chiara Rosa	Italy	16.15	16.36	x		16.36		2
7	Amanda Ngandu-Ntumba	France	15.20	16.19	x		16.19	PB	1

=== Discus throw ===
29 May

Rank	Name	Nationality	#1	#2	#3	#4	Result	Notes	Points
1	Liliana Cá	Portugal	59.30	x	58.48	61.36	61.36		7
2	Marike Steinacker	Germany	59.29	x	x	55.97	59.29		6
3	Kirsty Law	Great Britain	58.13	x	55.49	55.71	58.13		5
4	Daria Zabawska	Poland	56.61	x	56.53	56.86	56.86		4
5	Amanda Ngandu-Ntumba	France	49.65	55.79	53.42		55.79		3
6	Stefania Strumillo	Italy	54.87	54.27	55.67		55.67	SB	2
7	Paula Ferrándiz	Spain	x	51.57	x		51.57		1

=== Hammer throw ===
29 May

Rank	Name	Nationality	#1	#2	#3	#4	Result	Notes	Points
1	Alexandra Tavernier	France	75.06	74.75	x	x	75.06		7
2	Malwina Kopron	Poland	69.17	x	73.18	70.62	73.18		6
3	Sara Fantini	Italy	66.37	70.31	x	66.33	70.31	SB	5
4	Laura Redondo	Spain	69.53	67.73	x	68.82	69.53		4
5	Samantha Borutta	Germany	66.49	69.35	68.24		69.35	PB	3
6	Jessica Mayho	Great Britain	x	x	63.91		63.91		2
7	Vânia Silva	Portugal	54.62	59.40	59.58		59.58		1

=== Javelin throw ===
30 May

Rank	Name	Nationality	#1	#2	#3	#4	Result	Notes	Points
1	Christin Hussong	Germany	65.37	69.19	64.73	x	69.19	CR	7
2	Jona Aigouy	France	55.87	56.59	54.83	54.78	56.59		6
3	Freya Jones	Great Britain	54.68	49.44	50.28	x	54.68		5
4	Klaudia Regin	Poland	54.01	54.66	x	50.74	54.66		4
5	Zahra Bani	Italy	52.56	54.27	52.91		54.27		3
6	Arantza Moreno	Spain	47.92	52.64	53.40		53.40		2
7	Claudia Ferreira	Portugal	50.55	52.68	52.21		52.68	SB	1

== Final standings ==
After 40 out of 40 events.

Relegation to the 2023 First League

#	Country	Pts
1	Poland	181.50
2	Italy	179
3	Great Britain	174
4	Germany	171
5	Spain	167
6	France	140
7	Portugal	97.5
–	Ukraine	Withdrew

== Medal table ==
At the European Athletics Team Championships medals are not awarded, but with gold, silver and bronze conventionally refers to the top three finishes.

Rank	Nation	Gold	Silver	Bronze	Total
1	Poland (POL)	10	5	7	22
2	Italy (ITA)	8	6	5	19
3	Great Britain (GBR)	7	7	6	20
4	Germany (GER)	7	5	9	21
5	France (FRA)	4	4	5	13
6	Spain (ESP)	2	10	9	21
7	Portugal (POR)	2	3	0	5
Totals (7 entries)		40	40	41	121
