= 2019 European Athletics U23 Championships – Women's 100 metres hurdles =

The women's 100 metres hurdles event at the 2019 European Athletics U23 Championships was held in Gävle, Sweden, at Gavlehof Stadium Park on 11 and 12 July.

== Medalists ==
Gold	Silver	Bronze
Elvira Herman; Belarus	Klaudia Siciarz; Poland	Laura Valette; France

== Results ==
=== Heats ===
11 July
Qualification: First 4 in each heat (Q) and next 4 fastest (q) qualified for the semifinals.

Wind:
Heat 1: -1.2 m/s, Heat 2: -1.1 m/s, Heat 3: -2.5 m/s, Heat 4: -4.1 m/s, Heat 5: -0.1 m/s

Rank	Heat	Name	Nationality	Time	Notes
1	3	Elvira Herman	Belarus	13.25	Q
2	5	Sviatlana Parakhonka	Belarus	13.51	Q
3	2	Klaudia Siciarz	Poland	13.58	Q
4	3	Pauline Salies	France	13.67	Q
5	1	Laura Valette	France	13.72	Q
6	3	Karin Strametz	Austria	13.72	Q
7	1	Sarah Quinn	Ireland	13.73	Q, PB
8	3	Anni Siirtola	Finland	13.75	Q
9	2	Julia Enarvi	Finland	13.79	Q
10	1	Tereza Vokálová	Czech Republic	13.80	Q
11	2	Klaudia Sorok	Hungary	13.81	Q
12	4	Ruslana Rashkovan	Belarus	13.86	Q
13	1	Zuzanna Hulisz	Poland	13.87	Q
14	5	Klaudia Wojtunik	Poland	13.88	Q
15	2	Linda Guizzetti	Italy	13.89	Q
16	5	Kim Flattich	Switzerland	13.96	Q
17	1	Elena Marini	Italy	13.96	q
18	2	Kate Doherty	Ireland	14.05	q
19	5	Anja Lukić	Serbia	14.14	Q
20	4	Sacha Alessandrini	France	14.16	Q
21	4	Anastasiya Osokina	Ukraine	14.29	Q
22	4	Molly Scott	Ireland	14.29	Q
23	3	Milica Emini	Serbia	14.30	q
24	2	Simona Takácsová	Slovakia	14.31	q
25	4	Amanda Hansson	Sweden	14.34	
26	2	Magdeli Støten	Norway	14.38	
27	1	Sandra Röthlin	Switzerland	14.45	
28	3	Dafni Georgiou	Cyprus	14.46	
29	4	Desola Oki	Italy	14.47	
30	4	Selina von Jackowski	Switzerland	14.50	
31	1	Fanni Edőcs	Hungary	14.58	
32	5	Emma Hyvärinen	Finland	14.58	
33	3	Mariana António	Portugal	14.59	
	5	Kreete Verlin	Estonia	DNF	

=== Semifinals ===
12 July
Qualification: First 2 in each heat (Q) and next 2 fastest (q) qualified for the final.

Wind:
Heat 1: +1.8 m/s, Heat 2: +1.3 m/s, Heat 3: +0.5 m/s

Rank	Heat	Name	Nationality	Time	Notes
1	1	Klaudia Siciarz	Poland	13.00	Q
2	3	Elvira Herman	Belarus	13.03	Q
3	2	Laura Valette	France	13.14	Q
4	1	Ruslana Rashkovan	Belarus	13.21	Q
4	1	Sacha Alessandrini	France	13.21	Q, PB
6	2	Sviatlana Parakhonka	Belarus	13.29	Q
7	1	Klaudia Wojtunik	Poland	13.46	q
8	3	Pauline Salies	France	13.47	Q
9	3	Tereza Vokálová	Czech Republic	13.52	
10	2	Julia Enarvi	Finland	13.56	
11	2	Zuzanna Hulisz	Poland	13.57	
12	3	Sarah Quinn	Ireland	13.57	PB
13	2	Molly Scott	Ireland	13.59	
14	1	Anni Siirtola	Finland	13.60	PB
15	3	Klaudia Sorok	Hungary	13.66	
16	1	Elena Marini	Italy	13.67	
17	2	Kim Flattich	Switzerland	13.77	
18	2	Karin Strametz	Austria	13.80	
19	3	Simona Takácsová	Slovakia	14.02	
20	2	Milica Emini	Serbia	14.07	
21	1	Anastasiya Osokina	Ukraine	14.09	
22	3	Linda Guizzetti	Italy	14.12	
	1	Kate Doherty	Ireland	DNF	
	3	Anja Lukić	Serbia	DQ	R168.7 (b)

=== Final ===
12 July

Wind: +1.8 m/s

Rank	Lane	Name	Nationality	Time	Notes
1st place, gold medalist(s)	5	Elvira Herman	Belarus	12.70	SB
2nd place, silver medalist(s)	6	Klaudia Siciarz	Poland	12.82	PB
3rd place, bronze medalist(s)	3	Laura Valette	France	12.97	
4	4	Sacha Alessandrini	France	13.12	PB
5	8	Ruslana Rashkovan	Belarus	13.22	
6	7	Sviatlana Parakhonka	Belarus	13.31	
7	1	Klaudia Wojtunik	Poland	13.49	
8	2	Pauline Salies	France	13.53	
