= Sebastian Urbaniak =

Polish hurdler (born 2001)

Personal information
- Nationality: Poland
- Born: 9 June 2001 (25 years, 54 days old)
- Home town: Kruszwica, Poland

Sport
- Sport: Athletics
- Events: 400 metres hurdles 400 metres
- Club: LKS Vectra Włocławek

Achievements and titles
- National finals: 2019 Polish U20s; • 400m hurdles, 3rd (bronze); 2020 Polish Champs; • 400m hurdles, 6th; 2020 Polish U20s; • 400m hurdles, 1st (gold); 2021 Polish Champs; • 400m hurdles, 3rd (bronze); 2021 Polish U23s; • 400m hurdles, 1st (gold); 2022 Polish Champs; • 400m hurdles, 2nd (silver); 2022 Polish U23s; • 400m hurdles, 1st (gold); 2023 Polish U23s; • 400m hurdles, 1st (gold); 2023 Polish Champs; • 400m hurdles, 3rd (bronze)
- Personal bests
- Updated on 15 January 2024

Sebastian Urbaniak (born 9 June 2001) is a Polish hurdler specializing in the 400 metres hurdles. He is a three-time top-3 finisher at the Polish Athletics Championships, and he has represented Poland at the European Athletics Championships.

== Biography ==
Urbaniak is from Kruszwica, Poland where he competes representing the LKS Vectra Włocławek club.

Urbaniak's first international experience was at the 2021 European U23 Championships in Tallinn. He advanced from the 400 m hurdles first round with a 50.82 heat win, equalling his personal best and qualifying mark from May of that year. In the semifinals, Urbaniak ran 51.03 seconds and did not advance to the finals.

The following year, Urbaniak competed at the senior European Championships in the same event. Despite starting in a good position to advance, Urbaniak tripped and fell on the final hurdle. He ran 50.69 seconds to finish 4th in his heat, one place away from qualifying for the semifinals.

== Statistics ==
=== Best performances ===
Event	Mark	Place	Competition	Venue	Date	Ref
400 metres hurdles	49.68	3rd place, bronze medalist(s)	Résisprint International	La Chaux-de-Fonds, Switzerland	3 July 2022	
400 metres	47.19	(gold) (Race C)	Polish U23 Championships	Poznań, Poland	30 July 2022	
