= Athletics at the 2021 Summer World University Games – Women's 4 × 100 metres relay =

The women's 4 × 100 metres relay event at the 2021 Summer World University Games was held on 5 and 6 August 2023 at the Shuangliu Sports Centre Stadium in Chengdu, China.

== Medalists ==
Gold	Silver	Bronze
China; Liang Xiaojing; Ge Manqi; Cai Yanting; Li Yuting; Li He	Poland; Marlena Granaszewska; Monika Romaszko; Paulina Paluch; Nikola Horowska; Weronika Bartnowska	South Africa; Antoinette van der Merwe; Banele Shabangu; Joviale Mbisha; Tamzin Thomas

== Results ==
=== Round 1 ===
Qualification: First 3 in each heat (Q) and the next 2 fastest (q) advance to final.

Rank	Heat	Nation	Athletes	Time	Notes
1	2	China	Liang Xiaojing, Li He, Cai Yanting, Li Yuting	43.84	Q
2	1	Poland	Weronika Bartnowska, Monika Romaszko, Paulina Paluch, Marlena Granaszewska	44.07	Q
3	1	South Africa	Antoinette van der Merwe, Banele Shabangu, Joviale Mbisha, Tamzin Thomas	44.40	Q
4	1	India	Pratyusha Chelimi, Bhavani Bhagavathi, Sudeshna Shivankar, Avantika Narale	44.88	Q
5	2	Chinese Taipei	Zheng Xin-ying, Chang Li-ling, Liu Li-lin, Zhang Bo-ya	44.91	Q
6	1	Japan	Manaka Miura, Yuna Miura, Abigeirufuka Ido, Yu Ishikawa	44.92	q
7	1	Switzerland	Selina von Jackowski, Coralie Ambrosini, Céline Bürgi, Meret Baumgartner	44.96	q
8	2	Brazil	Anny de Bassi, Gabriela Mourão, Letícia Lima, Vitória Sena	44.97	Q
9	1	Turkey	Mizgin Ay, Şevval Ayaz, Simay Özçiftçi, Elif Polat	45.20	
10	2	Malaysia	Chelsea Cassiopea Evali, Nor Sarah Adi, Nur Afrina Batrisyia, Nur Aishah Rofina Aling	45.66	
–	2	Botswana	Lone Madzimule, Motlatsi Rante, Golekanye Chikani, Boitshepo Moloi	DQ	TR24.7
–	2	Uganda		DNS	
–	2	Australia		DNS	

=== Final ===
Rank	Nation	Athletes	Time	Notes
1st place, gold medalist(s)	China	Liang Xiaojing, Ge Manqi, Cai Yanting, Li Yuting	43.70	
2nd place, silver medalist(s)	Poland	Marlena Granaszewska, Monika Romaszko, Paulina Paluch, Nikola Horowska	44.20	
3rd place, bronze medalist(s)	South Africa	Antoinette van der Merwe, Banele Shabangu, Joviale Mbisha, Tamzin Thomas	44.36	
4	Japan	Manaka Miura, Yuna Miura, Abigeirufuka Ido, Yu Ishikawa	44.66	
5	Brazil	Anny de Bassi, Gabriela Mourão, Letícia Lima, Vitória Sena	44.81	
6	Switzerland	Selina von Jackowski, Coralie Ambrosini, Céline Bürgi, Meret Baumgartner	44.81	
7	Chinese Taipei	Zheng Xin-ying, Chang Li-ling, Liu Li-lin, Zhang Bo-ya	45.14	
–	India	Pratyusha Chelimi, Bhavani Bhagavathi, Sudeshna Shivankar, Avantika Narale	DNF	
