= Laura Valette =

French hurdler

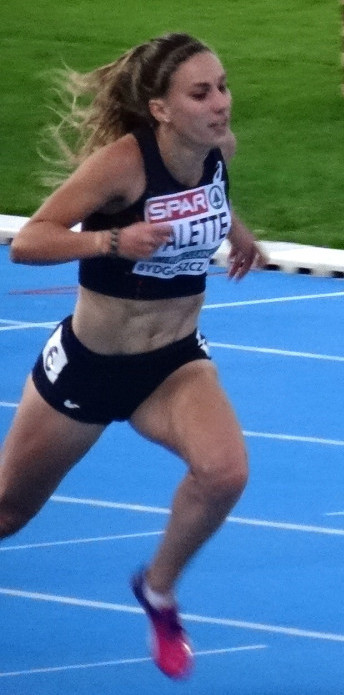
- Laura Valette in 2017

Personal information
- Full name: Laura Lise Valette
- Born: 16 February 1997 (age 29) Saint-Herblain, Nantes, France
- Education: INSA Rennes
- Height: 1.75 m (5 ft 9 in)
- Weight: 61 kg (134 lb)

Sport
- Sport: Athletics
- Events: 100 m hurdles, 60 m hurdles
- Club: Nantes Métropole Athlétisme
- Coached by: Richard Cursaz (2015–)

Laura Lise Valette (born 16 February 1997) is a French athlete specialising in the sprint hurdles. She won a gold medal at the 2014 Summer Youth Olympics and a bronze at the 2015 European Junior Championships.

Her personal bests are 13.04 seconds in the 100 metres hurdles (-0.4 m/s, Lille 2017) and 8.13 seconds in the 60 metres hurdles (Nantes 2017).

== International competitions ==
Year	Competition	Venue	Position	Event	Notes
Representing France
2013	European Youth Olympic Festival	Utrecht, Netherlands	1st	100 m hurdles (76.2 cm)	13.70 m (w)
2013	European Youth Olympic Festival	Utrecht, Netherlands	4th	4 × 100 m relay	47.22
2014	Youth Olympic Games	Nanjing, China	1st	100 m hurdles (76.2 cm)	13.34
2015	European Junior Championships	Eskilstuna, Sweden	3rd	100 m hurdles	13.21 (w)
2016	World U20 Championships	Bydgoszcz, Poland	8th	100 m hurdles	13.42
2017	European U23 Championships	Bydgoszcz, Poland	8th	100 m hurdles	13.85 (w)
2017	Universiade	Taipei, Taiwan	10th (sf)	100 m hurdles	13.64
2018	Mediterranean U23 Championships	Jesolo, Italy	1st	100 m hurdles	13.11 (w)
2018	Mediterranean Games	Tarragona, Spain	8th	100 m hurdles	13.94
2018	European Championships	Berlin, Germany	19th (sf)	100 m hurdles	13.22
2019	European U23 Championships	Gävle, Sweden	3rd	100 m hurdles	12.97
2019	World Championships	Doha, Qatar	32nd (h)	100 m hurdles	13.47
2021	Olympic Games	Tokyo, Japan	39th (h)	100 m hurdles	14.52
2022	European Championships	Munich, Germany	18th (sf)	100 m hurdles	13.20
