= 2021 European Athletics U23 Championships – Women's 100 metres hurdles =

Women's 100 metres hurdles at the 2021 European Athletics U23 Championships
- Venue: Kadriorg Stadium, Tallinn
- Dates: 9–10 July
- Competitors: 35 from 18 nations
- Winning time: 12.77

Medalists
gold medal	Pia Skrzyszowska	Poland
silver medal	Cyréna Samba-Mayela	France
bronze medal	Klaudia Wojtunik	Poland

The women's 100 metres hurdles event at the 2021 European Athletics U23 Championships was held in Tallinn, Estonia, at Kadriorg Stadium on 9 and 10 July.

== Records ==
Prior to the competition, the records were as follows:

European U23 record	Annelie Ehrhardt (GDR)	12.59	Munich, West Germany	8 September 1972
Championship U23 record	Elvira Herman (BLR)	12.70	Gävle, Sweden	12 July 2019

== Results ==
=== Round 1 ===
Qualification rule: First 4 in each heat (Q) and the next 4 fastest (q) advance to the Semi-Finals.

Wind:
Heat 1: -0.3 m/s, Heat 2: -0.2 m/s, Heat 3: +0.5 m/s, Heat 4: -1.1 m/s, Heat 5: -0.4 m/s

Rank	Heat	Name	Nationality	Time	Notes
1	1	Cyréna Samba-Mayela	France	12.98	Q
2	2	Zoë Sedney	Netherlands	13.08	Q
3	4	Pia Skrzyszowska	Poland	13.13	Q
4	3	Laëticia Bapté	France	13.19	Q
5	3	Klaudia Wojtunik	Poland	13.29	Q
6	5	Sacha Alessandrini	France	13.41	Q
7	5	Jenna Blundell	Great Britain	13.43	Q
8	3	Elena Carraro	Italy	13.44	Q
9	3	Anastasia Davies	Great Britain	13.45	Q
10	1	Markéta Štolová	Czech Republic	13.47	Q
11	2	Xenia Benach	Spain	13.50	Q
12	5	Ida Eikeng	Norway	13.52	Q
13	4	Şevval Ayaz	Turkey	13.59	Q
14	2	Tereza Elena Šínová	Czech Republic	13.59	Q, =SB
15	4	Anja Lukić	Serbia	13.62	Q
16	2	Giulia Guarriello	Italy	13.63	Q
17	2	Milica Emini	Serbia	13.65	q
18	1	Dafni Georgiou	Cyprus	13.67	Q
19	1	Elba Parmo	Spain	13.68	Q
20	3	Nikol Andonova	Bulgaria	13.72	q, PB
21	4	Andrea Zabloudilová	Czech Republic	13.76	Q
21	5	Zuzanna Hulisz	Poland	13.76	Q
23	4	Saara Keskitalo	Finland	13.77	q
24	1	Julia Wennersten	Sweden	13.78	q
25	4	Ingrid Pernille Rismark	Norway	13.83	PB
26	5	Larissa Bertényi	Switzerland	13.92	
27	1	Kristina Stensvoll Reppe	Norway	13.93	
28	5	Anastasiya Osokina	Ukraine	13.93	
29	3	Noora Juslin	Finland	13.94	
30	3	Fatumata Baldé	Portugal	14.07	
31	2	Amanda Hansson	Sweden	14.07	
32	2	Catarina Karas	Portugal	14.17	
33	3	Lovisa Karlsson	Sweden	14.23	SB
34	1	Beyzanur Yavuz	Turkey	14.25	
35	5	Paula Sprudzāne	Latvia	14.27	
	4	Tara Keber	Slovenia	DNS	

=== Semifinals ===
Qualification rule: First 2 in each heat (Q) and the next 2 fastest (q) advance to the Final.

Wind:
Heat 1: -2.2 m/s, Heat 2: -2.1 m/s, Heat 3: +0.8 m/s

Rank	Heat	Name	Nationality	Time	Notes
1	3	Pia Skrzyszowska	Poland	13.10	Q
2	2	Zoë Sedney	Netherlands	13.12	Q
3	1	Cyréna Samba-Mayela	France	13.15	Q
4	3	Laëticia Bapté	France	13.31	Q
5	1	Klaudia Wojtunik	Poland	13.31	Q
6	2	Markéta Štolová	Czech Republic	13.42	Q
7	2	Sacha Alessandrini	France	13.46	q
8	3	Anastasia Davies	Great Britain	13.52	q
9	3	Şevval Ayaz	Turkey	13.52	
10	1	Ida Eikeng	Norway	13.53	
11	3	Xenia Benach	Spain	13.56	
12	2	Anja Lukić	Serbia	13.57	
13	2	Elena Carraro	Italy	13.61	
14	2	Zuzanna Hulisz	Poland	13.64	
15	1	Jenna Blundell	Great Britain	13.67	
16	3	Tereza Elena Šínová	Czech Republic	13.69	
17	3	Nikol Andonova	Bulgaria	13.73	
18	1	Julia Wennersten	Sweden	13.75	
19	1	Giulia Guarriello	Italy	13.78	
20	2	Saara Keskitalo	Finland	13.78	
21	2	Dafni Georgiou	Cyprus	13.79	
22	3	Milica Emini	Serbia	13.82	
23	1	Elba Parmo	Spain	14.01	
24	1	Andrea Zabloudilová	Czech Republic	14.05	

=== Final ===
Wind: –0.9 m/s

Rank	Lane	Name	Nationality	Time	Notes
1st place, gold medalist(s)	6	Pia Skrzyszowska	Poland	12.77	PB
2nd place, silver medalist(s)	3	Cyréna Samba-Mayela	France	12.80	
3rd place, bronze medalist(s)	8	Klaudia Wojtunik	Poland	12.97	PB
4	5	Zoë Sedney	Netherlands	13.14	
5	1	Sacha Alessandrini	France	13.15	
6	4	Laëticia Bapté	France	13.27	
7	7	Markéta Štolová	Czech Republic	13.28	SB
8	2	Anastasia Davies	Great Britain	13.53	
