= 2021 World Athletics Relays – Women's 4 × 200 metres relay =

Women's 4 × 200 metres relay at the 2021 World Athletics Relays
- Venue: Silesian Stadium
- Dates: 2 May 2021
- Nations: 5

Medalists
gold medal	Paulina Guzowska; Kamila Ciba; Klaudia Adamek; Marlena Gola	Poland
silver medal	Aoife Lynch; Kate Doherty; Sarah Quinn; Sophie Becker	Ireland
bronze medal	Ángela Tenorio; Virginia Villalba; Marizol Landázuri; Anahí Suárez	Ecuador

The Women's 4 × 200 metres relay at the 2021 World Athletics Relays was held at Silesian Stadium on 2 May.

== Records ==
Prior to the competition, the records were as follows:

World record	United States Blue (Marion Jones; Nanceen Perry; Latasha Colander; Latasha Jenkins)	1:27.46	Philadelphia, United States	29 April 2000
Championship record	Jamaica (Jura Levy; Shericka Jackson; Sashalee Forbes; Elaine Thompson)	1:29.04	(The Bahamas) Nassau, Bahamas	22 April 2017
World lead	All-Star Athletics (Javianne Oliver; Kortnei Johnson; Dezerea Bryant; Sha'carri Richardson)	1:31.69	Prairie View, Texas, United States	27 March 2021

== Results ==
KEY:	WL	World leading	CR	Championship record	NR	National record	SB	Seasonal best

=== Final ===
Rank	Lane	Nation	Athletes	Time	Notes
1st place, gold medalist(s)	6	Poland	Paulina Guzowska, Kamila Ciba, Klaudia Adamek, Marlena Gola	1:34.98	NR
2nd place, silver medalist(s)	4	Ireland	Aoife Lynch, Kate Doherty, Sarah Quinn, Sophie Becker	1:35.93	NR
3rd place, bronze medalist(s)	2	Ecuador	Ángela Tenorio, Virginia Villalba, Marizol Landázuri, Anahí Suárez	1:36.86	SB
4	5	Denmark	Louise Østergaard, Emma Beiter Bomme, Mathilde Kramer, Mette Graversgaard	1:37.80	NR
5	3	Kenya	Joan Cherono, Doreen Waka, Monica Safania, Maximila Imali	1:38.26	NR
