= Lorenzo Patta =

Italian sprinter

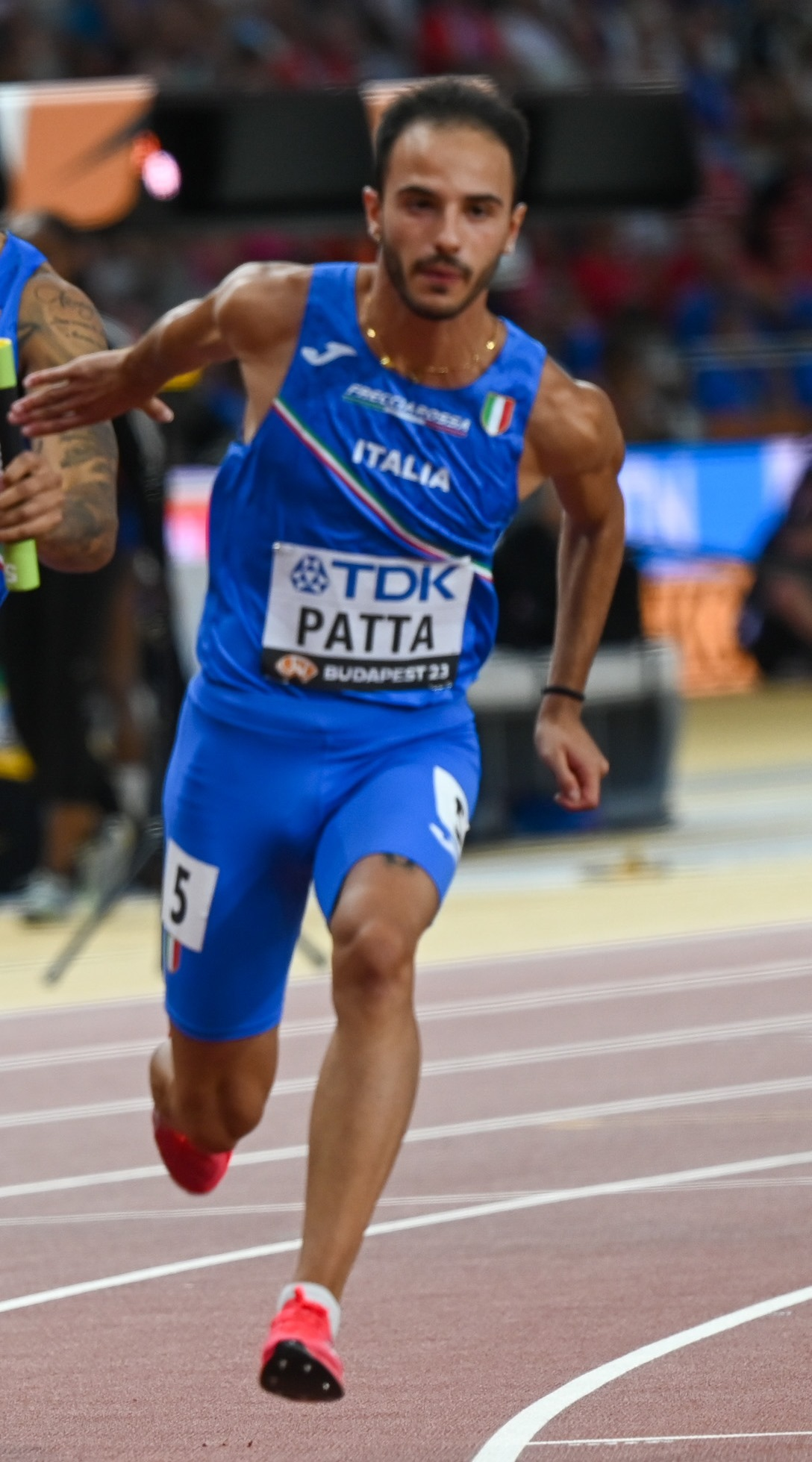
- Patta at Budapest 2023

Personal information
- National team: Italy (2021-)
- Born: 23 May 2000 (age 26) Oristano, Italy
- Height: 1.73 m (5 ft 8 in)
- Weight: 60 kg (132 lb)

Sport
- Sport: Athletics
- Event: Sprinting
- Club: G.S. Fiamme Gialle; Ss Atl. Oristano
- Coached by: Francesco Garau

Achievements and titles
- Personal bests: 100 m: 10.13 (2021); 200 m: 20.91 (2022)
Medal record
Men's athletics
Representing Italy
Olympic Games
Gold medal – first place	2020 Tokyo	4 × 100 m relay
World Championships
Silver medal – second place	2023 Budapest	4 × 100 m relay
European Championships
Gold medal – first place	2024 Rome	4 × 100 m relay
European Games
Silver medal – second place	2023 Kraków-Małopolska	4 × 100 m relay
European U20 Championships
Silver medal – second place	2019 Borås	4 × 100 m relay

Lorenzo Patta (born 23 May 2000) is an Italian sprinter who won a gold medal in 4 × 100 m relay at the 2020 Summer Olympics in Tokyo, Japan.

On 13 May 2021, running in Savona in 10.13, he established the 7th Italian all-time performance on 100 m and at the same time he reached 41st place in the seasonal world ranking.

== Career ==
He started athletics only during spring 2016, running at school games. Previously he was a football player at La Palma Monteurpinu. In 2017, as a U18, he was second at the national indoors championships on 60 metres, with Valentina Piras as his coach, but continuing playing football. Then the same year, he won the 200 m outdoors. From 2018, he only competes in athletics with a new coach, Francesco Garau, as U20 (junior). He won the Italian titles outdoors (100 and 200 m) with a remarkable 10.37 (+2.3 m/s) for his first competition as a junior. He represented Italy at the 2018 World U20 Championships, at 200 m and at 4 × 100 m relay, where he did not finish the relay after qualifying Italian team for the final. The following year, he was also the last relay, winning the silver medal at the 2019 European U20 Championships in Borås. In 2020, he ran 10.31 in Grosseto, personal best, for winning U23 national title. In 2021, after a new personal best of 10.13 set in Savona, he replaced Marcell Jacobs on 100 m in Chorzów and finished second of the European Team Championships at his first selection in the senior Italian team.

== National records ==
- 4 × 100 m relay: 37.50 ( (Japan) Tokyo, 6 August 2021), he ran first leg in the team with Marcell Jacobs, Fausto Desalu, Filippo Tortu.

== Achievements ==
Year	Competition	Venue	Rank	Event	Time	Notes
2019	European U20 Championships	(Sweden) Borås	2nd	4 × 100 m relay	39.89	
2021	European Team Championships	(Poland) Chorzów	2nd	100 m	10.29	
2021	European Team Championships	(Poland) Chorzów	5th	4 × 100 m relay	39.28	
2021	Olympic Games	(Japan) Tokyo	1st	4 × 100 m relay	37.50	WL, NR
2023	European Team Championships	(Poland) Chorzów	2nd	4 × 100 m relay	38.47	SB
2023	World Championships	(Hungary) Budapest	2nd	4 × 100 m relay	37.62	SB
2025	World Relays	(China) Guangzhou	5th	4 × 100 m relay	38.20	

== See also ==
- List of Italian records in athletics
- Italian all-time lists - 100 m
- Italian all-time lists - 4 × 100 m relay
- Italian national track relay team
