= Paulina Paluch =

Polish sprinter

Personal information
- Nationality: Polish
- Born: 3 December 1998 (age 27)

Sport
- Sport: Athletics
- Event: 100 metres
Medal record
Summer World University Games
Silver medal – second place	2021 Chengdu	4×100 m

Paulina Paluch (born 3 December 1998) is a Polish athlete. She competed in the women's 4 × 100 metres relay event at the 2020 Summer Olympics.
