= Eliza Megger =

Polish middle-distance runner (born 1999)

Personal information
- Born: 29 August 1999 (age 27)

Sport
- Country: Poland
- Sport: Track and field
- Events: 1500 metres , 3000 metres

Eliza Megger (born August 29, 1999) is a Polish middle-distance runner who competes in the 1500 metres and 3000 metres. She won the Polish national championship in the 1500 metres in 2021, and was the Polish indoor champion in the 3000 metres in 2022.

Internationally, Megger competed at the European Athletics U20 Championships in 2017, placing 11th in the 3000 metres. Megger was selected to compete at the 2023 World Athletics Championships in Budapest, where she ran a 4:09.22 in the 1500 metres event and did not advance past her heat.

Her personal best in the 1500 metres is 4:03.04, set in 2022.
