= Klaudia Wojtunik =

Polish athletics competitor

Personal information
- Born: 15 May 1999 (age 27)
- Height: 1.68 m (5 ft 6 in)
- Weight: 57 kg (126 lb)

Sport
- Sport: Athletics
- Events: 100 m hurdles, 60 m hurdles
- Club: CWKS Resovia Rzeszów (2012–2019); AZS Łódź (2019–)
- Coached by: Janusz Mazur (–2017); Henryka Blausz (2019–)

Klaudia Wojtunik (born 15 May 1999) is a Polish athlete specialising in the sprint hurdles. She won a bronze medal at the 2021 European U23 Championships.

Her personal bests are 12.97 seconds in the 100 metres hurdles (-0.9 m/s, Tallinn 2021) and 8.07 seconds in the 60 metres hurdles (Toruń 2022).

== International competitions ==
Year	Competition	Venue	Position	Event	Notes
Representing Poland
2015	European Youth Olympic Festival	Tbilisi, Georgia	12th (h)	100 m hurdles (76.2 cm)	14.31
2017	European U20 Championships	Grosseto, Italy	10th (sf)	100 m hurdles	14.13
2018	World U20 Championships	Tampere, Finland	12th (sf)	100 m hurdles	13.54
2019	European U23 Championships	Gävle, Sweden	7th	100 m hurdles	13.49
2021	World Relays	Chorzów, Poland	2nd	Shuttle hurdles relay	56.68
2021	European U23 Championships	Tallinn, Estonia	3rd	100 m hurdles	12.97
2022	World Indoor Championships	Belgrade, Serbia	30th (h)	60 m hurdles	8.21
2022	European Championships	Munich, Germany	11th (sf)	100 m hurdles	13.03
2023	World University Games	Chengdu, China	9th (sf)	100 m hurdles	13.19
2024	European Championships	Rome, Italy	9th (sf)	100 m hurdles	12.84
2026	European Championships	Birmingham, United Kingdom	20th (h)	100 m hurdles	13.20
