= Klaudia Siciarz =

Polish athletics competitor

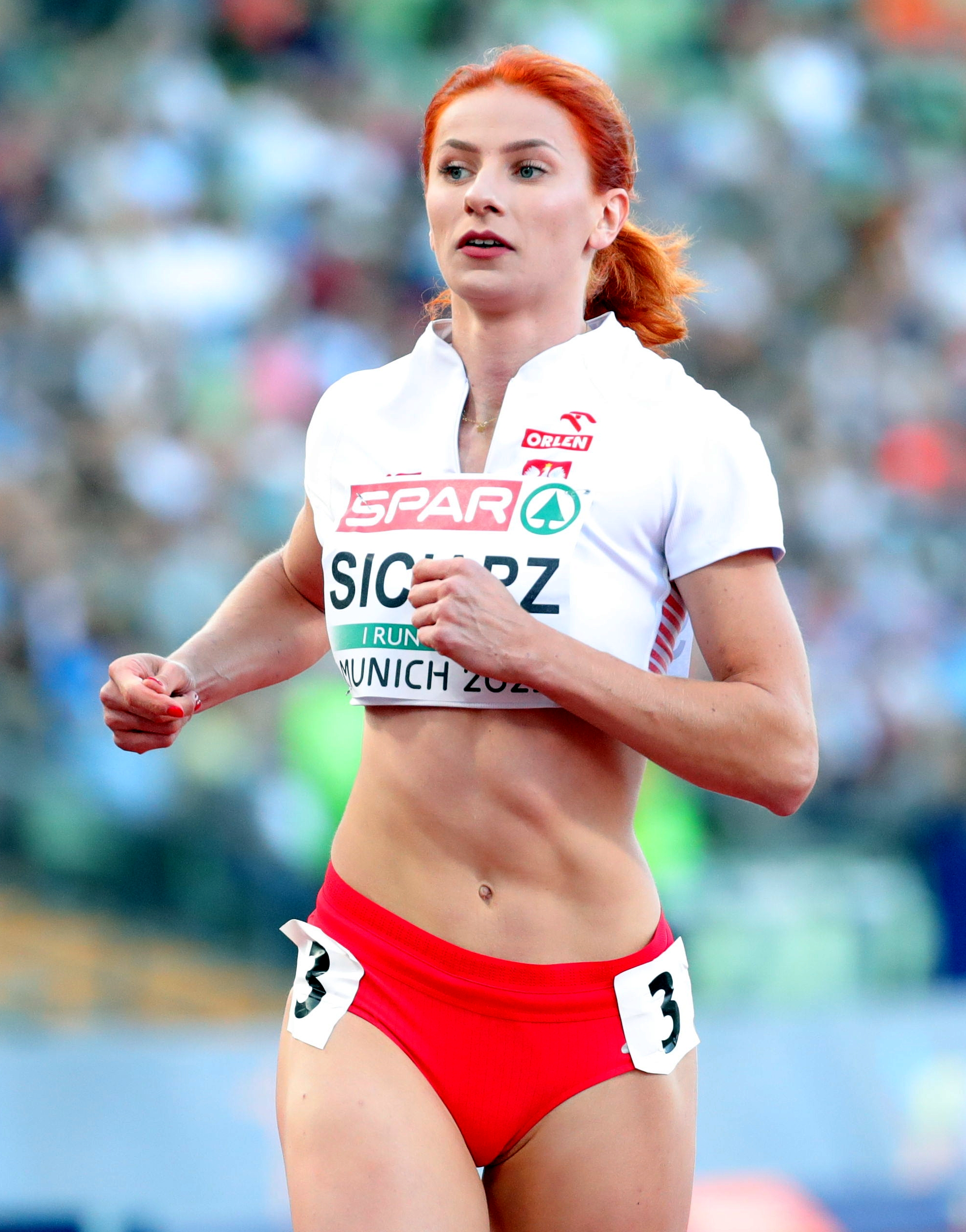

Personal information
- Born: 15 March 1998 (age 28)
- Height: 1.82 m (6 ft 0 in)
- Weight: 62 kg (137 lb)

Sport
- Sport: Athletics
- Events: 100 m hurdles, 60 m hurdles
- Club: AZS-AWF Kraków
- Coached by: Ewa Ślusarczyk
Medal record
Athletics
Representing Poland
European U23 Championships
Silver medal – second place	2019 Gävle	100 m hurdles
Bronze medal – third place	2019 Gävle	4 x 100 m

Klaudia Siciarz (pronounced [ˈklaw.dja ˈɕi.t͡ɕaʐ]; born 15 March 1998) is a retired Polish athlete who specialised in the sprint hurdles. In February 2017 she ran 8.00 seconds in the 60 metres hurdles which was the world U20 record until being broken by Tara Davis with 7.98 the following indoor season. In addition, she won a bronze medal in the 100 metres hurdles at the 2017 European U20 Championships and the silver at the 2019 European U23 Championships. She retired from athletics in April 2025 at the age of 27.

Her personal bests are 12.82 seconds in the 100 metres hurdles (+1.8 m/s, Gävle 2019) and 7.95 seconds in the 60 metres hurdles (Toruń 2019).

== Early life and education ==
Siciarz was born in Kraków, Poland. Alongside her athletic career, she studied sports at the University of Physical Education in Kraków (AWF Kraków).

== Career ==
=== Domestic Accomplishments ===
Through her career representing AZS-AWF Kraków, Siciarz established herself as one of Poland's top short hurdlers. At the 2017 Polish Indoor Championships in Toruń, she captured her first senior national title in the 60m hurdles where she set her (now old) World U20 Record of 8.00s. After 2017, two more national titles in the same discipline followed in 2019 (set personal best) and 2022. Outdoors, she won the senior Polish national title in the 100 metres hurdles in 2018 with a wind-assisted time of 12.74s and earned silver in 2023 behind Pia Skrzyszowska as well as in 2019, 2021 and 2022. Her personal bests of 7.95s (60m hurdles indoors) and 12.82s (100m hurdles outdoors) rank among the top ten fastest times in Polish athletics history in their respective disciplines.

=== International Accomplishments & Breakthroughs ===
On the international stage, Siciarz made a major early breyakthrough on February 18, 2017, when she set a World U20 Indoor Record in the 60m with a time of 8.00s at the age of only 18. That summer, she secured bronze at the 2017 European U20 Championships in Grosseto. Her major international breakthrough cam during a dominant 2019 season. After reaching the semifinals at the European Athletics Indoor Championships in Glasgow, she starred at the 2019 European U23 Championships in Gävle, claiming silver in the 100m hurdles with a career-best time of 12.82s and adding a bronze in the 4 × 100 m relay. This momentum carried her througnh the pandemic-disrupted period into her senior Olympic debut at the postponed 2020 Tokyo Olympic Games in 2021. In Tokyo, she reached the semifinals of the 100m hurdles at the 2020 Tokyo Olympics (finishing 17th overall with 12.84s). She went on to represent Poland at subsequent major championships, including the 2022 World Championships in Eugene, the 2023 World Championships in Budapest, and the European Championships in Munich (2022) and Rome (2024).

== International competitions ==
Year	Competition	Venue	Position	Event	Notes
Representing Poland
2013	European Youth Olympic Festival	Utrecht, Netherlands	19th (h)	100 m hurdles (76.2 cm)	15.03
2015	World Youth Championships	Cali, Colombia	8th	100 m hurdles (76.2 cm)	13.75
2017	European U20 Championships	Grosseto, Italy	3rd	100 m hurdles	13.33
2018	European Championships	Berlin, Germany	16th (sf)	100 m hurdles	13.12
2019	European Indoor Championships	Glasgow, United Kingdom	13th (sf)	60 m hurdles	8.14
2019	European U23 Championships	Gävle, Sweden	2nd	100 m hurdles	12.82
2019	European U23 Championships	Gävle, Sweden	3rd	4 × 100 m relay	44.08
2021	Olympic Games	Tokyo, Japan	17th (sf)	100 m hurdles	12.84
2022	World Championships	Eugene, United States	31st (h)	100 m hurdles	13.27
2022	European Championships	Munich, Germany	10th (sf)	100 m hurdles	13.00
2023	World Championships	Budapest, Hungary	38th (h)	100 m hurdles	13.25
2024	European Championships	Rome, Italy	12th (sf)	100 m hurdles	12.94
