= Marlena Granaszewska =

Polish sprinter (born 1998)

Marlena Granaszewska (Gola)
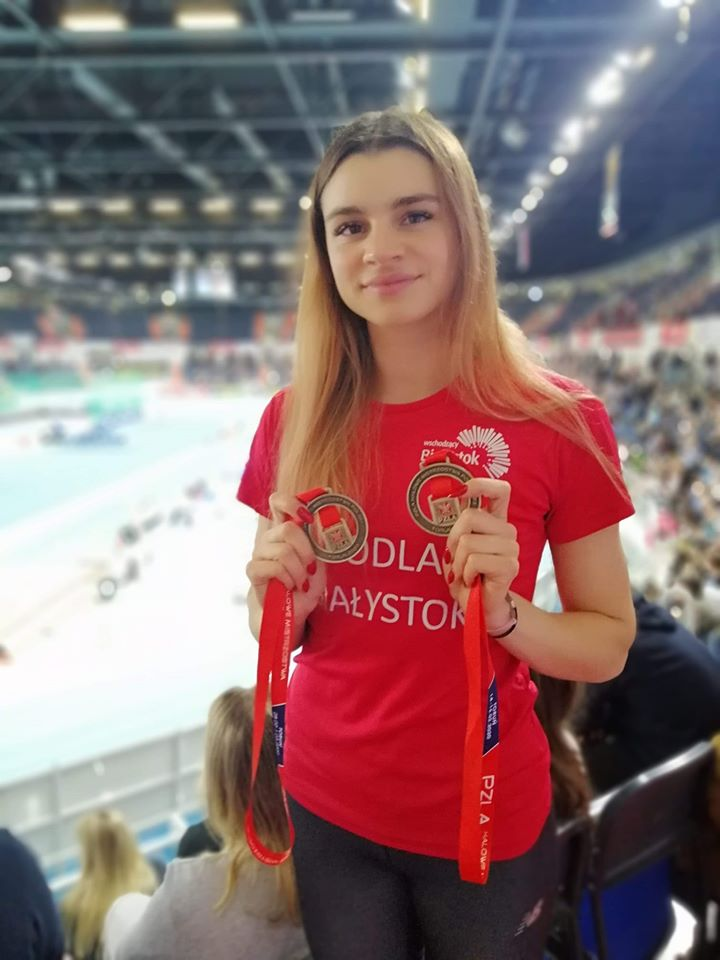
- Granaszewska in 2020

Personal information
- Nationality: Polish
- Born: June 8, 1998 (age 28) Białystok, Poland
- Height: 1.64 m (5 ft 5 in)
- Weight: 55 kg (121 lb)

Sport
- Country: Poland
- Sport: Track and field
- Event: Sprint 100m, 200m
Medal record
Athletics
Representing Poland
World Relays
Gold medal – first place	2021 Chorzów	4 × 200 m relay
European Team Championships
Gold medal – first place	2021 Chorzów	200 m
Gold medal – first place	2021 Chorzów	4 × 100 m
European U23 Championships
Bronze medal – third place	2019 Gävle	4 × 100 m
Summer World University Games
Silver medal – second place	2021 Chengdu	200 m
Silver medal – second place	2021 Chengdu	4×100 m
- Updated on 08 July 2021

Marlena Granaszewska (Gola) (born 8 June 1998) is a Polish athlete specialising track and field sprinter. She won the gold medal at the 2021 European Team Championships and 2021 IAAF World Relays. She also took the bronze medal at the 2019 European Athletics U23 Championships.

Marlena is a three-time winner of the Polish Athletics Championships in the 200 metres.

== Personal bests ==
Outdoor

- 100 metres – 11.48 (Bielsko-Biała 2021)
- 200 metres – 23.33 (Chorzów 2021)

Indoor

- 60 metres – 7.48 (Toruń 2020)
- 200 metres – 23.64 (Toruń 2020)

== International competitions ==
Representing Poland
Year	Competition	Venue	Position	Event	Result	Notes
2017	European Athletics U20 Championships	Grosseto, Italy	10th	4 × 100 m relay	45.27	
2019	European U23 Championships	Gävle, Sweden	11th (sf)	200 m	24.11	6th in semi-final 2
2019	European U23 Championships	Gävle, Sweden	3rd	4 × 100 m relay	44.08	
2021	World Relays	Chorzów, Poland	1st	4 × 200 m relay	1:34.98	NR
2021	European Team Championships	Chorzów, Poland	1st	200 m	23.33	
2021	European Team Championships	Chorzów, Poland	1st	4 × 100 m relay	43.83	
2023	World University Games	Chengdu, China	2nd	200 m	23.20	
2023	World University Games	Chengdu, China	2nd	4 × 100 m relay	44.20	
2023	World University Games	Chengdu, China	1st (h)	4 × 400 m relay	3:34.52	
2024	European Championships	Rome, Italy	17th (h)	200 m	23.53	
