= Klaudia Adamek =

Polish sprinter and bobsledder (born 1999)

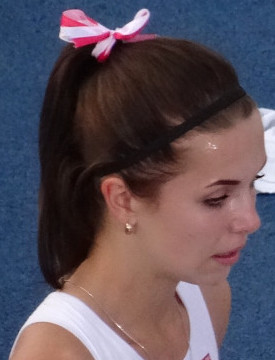
- Klaudia Adamek in 2016

Personal information
- Nationality: Polish
- Born: 22 March 1999 (age 27)

Sport
- Country: Poland
- Sport: Athletics
- Event: 100 metres
Medal record
Track and field
Representing Poland
World Relay Championships
Gold medal – first place	2021 Chorzów	4×200 m relay
Silver medal – second place	2021 Chorzów	4×100 m relay
European Team Championships
Silver medal – second place	2021 Chorzów	4×100 m relay

Klaudia Natalia Adamek (born 22 March 1999) is a Polish athlete. She competed at the 2021 World Athletics Relays, winning the silver medal in the women's 4 × 100 metres relay event.

Adamek represented Poland in bobsleigh at the 2026 Winter Olympics.
