= Poland at the 2026 European Athletics Championships =

- WA code: POL
- National federation: Polish Athletics Association
- Website: www.pzla.pl

in Birmingham, United Kingdom
- Competitors: 75 (34 men and 41 women)
- Medals: Gold 0 Silver 6 Bronze 2 Total 8

European Athletics Championships appearances
- 1934; 1938; 1946; 1950; 1954; 1958; 1962; 1966; 1969; 1971; 1974; 1978; 1982; 1986; 1990; 1994; 1998; 2002; 2006; 2010; 2012; 2014; 2016; 2018; 2022; 2024; 2026

Poland competed at the 2026 European Athletics Championships in Birmingham, United Kingdom, between 10 and 16 August 2026. A delegation of 75 athletes (57 individual athletes and 18 relay competitors) is sent to represent the country.

Poland finished 18th in the medal table with 6 silver a 2 bronze medals. For the first time since 2006, the Polish delegation failed to win a single gold medal at the European Athletics Championships.

== Medals ==
Medal	Name	Event	Date
Silver	Ewa Swoboda	Women's 100 metres	10 August
Silver	Pia Skrzyszowska	Women's 100 metres hurdles	11 August
Silver	Katarzyna Zdziebło	Women's marathon race walk	15 August
Silver	Natalia Bukowiecka	Women's 400 metres	15 August
Silver	Maria Żodzik	Women's high jump	15 August
Silver	Klaudia Kazimierska	Women's 1500 metres	16 August
Bronze	Jakub Szymański	Men's 100 metres hurdles	12 August
Bronze	Wiktoria Gajosz; Pia Skrzyszowska; Magdalena Stefanowicz; Ewa Swoboda; Krystsina Tsimanouskaya	Women's 4 × 100m relay	15 August

== Results ==
The following athletes are selected to compete by the Polish Athletics Association.

- including alternates

Key

- Note–Ranks given for track events are within the athlete's heat only
- Q = Qualified by place in Track Events or by standard in Field Events
- q = Qualified by time in Track Events or without standard in Field Events
- qR= Advanced to the next round by referee.
- NR = National record
- CHB = Championship best
- WL = World Leading
- PB = Personal best
- SB = Season's best
- — = Round not applicable for the event
- Bye = Athlete not required to compete in round
- DNF = Did Not Finish (Running or Race Walking Events)
- DNS = Did not start
- DQ = Disqualified
- NM = No Mark (No valid trial recorded in Field Events

Men
Track and road events

Athlete	Event	Heat		Semifinal		Final	
Athlete	Event	Result	Rank	Result	Rank	Result	Rank
Dominik Kopeć	100 metres	Bye		10.32	9 q	10.29	5
Maksymilian Szwed	400 metres	45.53	3 q	45.10	8 q	45.06	6
Bartosz Kitliński	800 metres	1:46.45	5	Did not advance			
Filip Ostrowski	800 metres	1:45.35	3 Q	1:44.08 PB	7	Did not advance	
Maciej Wyderka	800 metres	1:46.58	5	Did not advance			
Filip Ostrowski	1500 metres	3:38.70	10	—N/a		Did not advance	
Damian Czykier	110 metres hurdles	13.75	5 q	13.62	5	Did not advance	
Jakub Szymański	110 metres hurdles	Bye		13.26 SB	1 Q	13.26	3rd place, bronze medalist(s)
Adam Bajorski	3000 metres steeplechase	8:49.90	12	—N/a		Did not advance	
Maciej Megier	3000 metres steeplechase	8:53.30	13	—N/a		Did not advance	
Maher Ben Hlima	Half marathon walk	—N/a				1:26:14 NR PB	9
Dominik Kopeć; Patryk Krupa; Jakub Lempach; Sebastian Libura; Łukasz Żak	4 × 100 metres relay	39.17	4 q	—N/a		39.18	5
Kajetan Duszyński; Marcin Karolewski; Mateusz Rzeźniczak; Maksymilian Szwed; Wiktor Wróbel; Remigiusz Zazula	4 × 400 metres relay	3:01.33	3 q	—N/a		3:00.56 SB	6

Field events

Athlete	Event	Qualification		Final	
Athlete	Event	Distance	Position	Distance	Position
Mateusz Kołodziejski	High Jump	2.23	3 q	2.23	5
Mikołaj Szczęsny	High Jump	2.19	16	Did not advance	
Piotr Tarkowski	Long jump	7.84	16	Did not advance	
Konrad Bukowiecki	Shot put	19.82	8 q	20.38	7
Szymon Mazur	Shot put	19.76	11 q	19.14	11
Damian Rodziak	Discus throw	59.92	16	Did not advance	
Paweł Fajdek	Hammer throw	77.35	5 q	79.13	5
Wojciech Nowicki	Hammer throw	74.49	13	Did not advance	
Dawid Piłat	Hammer throw	70.63	24	Did not advance	
Marcin Wrotyński	Hammer throw	72.90	17	Did not advance	
Marcin Krukowski	Javelin throw	79.71	3 q	79.69	7
Dawid Wegner	Javelin throw	82.40	3 Q	82.96 SB	4

Women
Track and road events

Athlete	Event	Heat		Semifinal		Final	
Athlete	Event	Result	Rank	Result	Rank	Result	Rank
Ewa Swoboda	100 m	Bye		11.04	1 Q	11.02	2nd place, silver medalist(s)
Krystsina Tsimanouskaya	100 m	11.30	11 q	11.44	8	Did not advance	
Wiktoria Gajosz	200 m	23.44	5	Did not advance			
Natalia Bukowiecka	400 m	Bye		49.57 SB	1 Q	50.10	2nd place, silver medalist(s)
Aleksandra Formella	800 m	2:00.63	6	Did not advance			
Anna Wielgosz	800 m	2:00.96	4	Did not advance			
Klaudia Kazimierska	1500 m	4:09.61	2 Q	—N/a		4:08.80	2nd place, silver medalist(s)
Weronika Lizakowska	1500 m	4:08.43	4 Q	—N/a		4:11.81	9
Elżbieta Glinka	10,000 m	—N/a				32:16.65	12
Aleksandra Lisowska	Marathon	—N/a				2:30:21 SB	12
Pia Skrzyszowska	100 m hurdles	Bye		12.60	1 Q	12.67	2nd place, silver medalist(s)
Klaudia Wojtunik	100 m hurdles	13.20	20	Did not advance			
Anna Gryc	400 m hurdles	56.66	18	Did not advance			
Izabela Smolińska	400 m hurdles	55.91	5 q	55.52	7	Did not advance	
Agnieszka Chorzępa	3000 m steeplechase	9:33.06	4 Q	—N/a		9:36.20	9
Alicja Konieczek	3000 m steeplechase	9:33.22 SB	6 Q	—N/a		9:46.90	14
Kinga Królik	3000 m steeplechase	9:35.98	8 Q	—N/a		9:46.20	13
Magdalena Żelazna	Half marathon walk	—N/a				1:40:08 PB	20
Kinga Waleriańczyk	Marathon walk	—N/a				3:43:58 PB	14
Anna Zdziebło	Marathon walk	—N/a				3:42:08 PB	12
Katarzyna Zdziebło	Marathon walk	—N/a				3:19:50 NR	2nd place, silver medalist(s)
Wiktoria Gajosz; Pia Skrzyszowska; Magdalena Stefanowicz; Ewa Swoboda; Krystsina Tsimanouskaya	4 × 100m relay	42.63 SB	2 Q	—N/a		43.15	3rd place, bronze medalist(s)
Kinga Gacka; Anna Gryc; Natalia Korczuk; Anastazja Kuś; Izabela Smolińska; Alicja Wrona-Kutrzepa	4 × 400 m relay	3:26.92	5 q	—N/a		3:27.63	7

Field events

Athlete	Event	Qualification		Final	
Athlete	Event	Distance	Position	Distance	Position
Wiktoria Miąso	High jump	1.88	10	Did not advance	
Maja Słodzińska	High jump	1.80	15	Did not advance	
Maria Żodzik	High jump	1.91	1 Q	1.95	2nd place, silver medalist(s)
Zofia Gaborska	Pole vault	4.25	11	Did not advance	
Zuzanna Maślana	Shot put	16.72	16	Did not advance	
Weronika Muszyńska	Discus throw	53.80	24	Did not advance	
Daria Zabawska	Discus throw	59.37	11 q	58.54	10
Ewa Różańska	Hammer throw	65.24	20	Did not advance	
Aleksandra Śmiech	Hammer throw	68.93	9 q	69.12	8
Anita Włodarczyk	Hammer throw	68.70	11 q	72.37	4
Maria Andrejczyk	Javelin throw	55.21	9	Did not advance	
Małgorzata Maślak-Glugla	Javelin throw	58.14	5 q	58.51	8

Combined events – Heptathlon

Athlete	Event	100H	HJ	SP	200 m	LJ	JT	800 m	Final	Rank
Adrianna Sułek-Schubert	Result	13.30	1.86 SB	14.65	23.84 SB	6.23	36.19	2:15.05	6375	7
Adrianna Sułek-Schubert	Points	1081	1054	837	996	921	594	892	6375	7
