= Poland at the 2018 European Athletics Championships =

- WA code: POL
- National federation: Polish Athletic Association
- Website: www.pzla.pl

in Berlin
- Competitors: 86 in 23 events
- Medals Ranked 2nd: Gold 7 Silver 4 Bronze 1 Total 12

European Athletics Championships appearances
- 1934; 1938; 1946; 1950; 1954; 1958; 1962; 1966; 1969; 1971; 1974; 1978; 1982; 1986; 1990; 1994; 1998; 2002; 2006; 2010; 2012; 2014; 2016; 2018; 2022; 2024; 2026

Poland competed at the 2018 European Athletics Championships in Berlin, Germany, from 6–12 August 2018, and a delegation of 86 athletes was sent to represent the country.

== Medals ==
Medal	Name	Event	Date
Gold	Wojciech Nowicki	Men's hammer throw	7 August
Gold	Michał Haratyk	Men's shot put	7 August
Gold	Paulina Guba	Women's shot put	8 August
Gold	Justyna Święty-Ersetic	Women's 400 metres	11 August
Gold	Adam Kszczot	Men's 800 metres	11 August
Gold	Małgorzata Hołub-Kowalik; Iga Baumgart-Witan; Patrycja Wyciszkiewicz; Justyna Święty-Ersetic	Women's 4 × 400 metres relay	11 August
Gold	Anita Włodarczyk	Women's hammer throw	12 August
Silver	Paweł Fajdek	Men's hammer throw	7 August
Silver	Konrad Bukowiecki	Men's shot put	7 August
Silver	Marcin Lewandowski	Men's 1500 metres	10 August
Silver	Sofia Ennaoui	Women's 1500 metres	12 August
Bronze	Joanna Fiodorow	Women's hammer throw	12 August

== Results ==
Men
Track and road

Athletes	Event	Heats		Semifinal		Final	
Athletes	Event	Result	Rank	Result	Rank	Result	Rank
Dominik Kopeć	100 metres	10.37	10 q	10.29	12	Did not advance	
Remigiusz Olszewski	100 metres	10.44	19	Did not advance			
Przemysław Słowikowski	100 metres	10.54	28	Did not advance			
Dariusz Kowaluk	400 metres	46.18	15	Did not advance			
Łukasz Krawczuk	400 metres	46.17	14 q	45.78 SB	20	Did not advance	
Karol Zalewski	400 metres	Bye		45.11 PB	6 Q	45.34	4
Mateusz Borkowski	800 metres	1:46.41	2 Q	1:46.54	7 Q	1:45.42 PB	5
Adam Kszczot	800 metres	1:46.31	1 Q	1:46.11	1 Q	1:44.59 SB	1st place, gold medalist(s)
Michał Rozmys	800 metres	1:48.01	17 Q	1:46.17 SB	3 Q	1:45.32 PB	4
Marcin Lewandowski	1500 metres	3:40.74	2 Q	—N/a		3:38.14	2nd place, silver medalist(s)
Błażej Brzeziński	Marathon	—N/a				2:22:35	45
Arkadiusz Gardzielewski	Marathon	—N/a				2:18:21	21
Mariusz Giżyński	Marathon	—N/a				2:16:02	13
Artur Kozłowski	Marathon	—N/a				2:26:28	52
Yared Shegumo	Marathon	—N/a				DNF	
Henryk Szost	Marathon	—N/a				2:18:09	19
Damian Czykier	110 metres hurdles	Bye		13.45	8 q	13.38	4
Artur Noga	110 metres hurdles	13.71	11 q	13.66	19	Did not advance	
Patryk Dobek	400 metres hurdles	Bye		48.75	2 Q	48.59 SB	5
Jakub Mordyl	400 metres hurdles	51.15	18	Did not advance			
Krystian Zalewski	3000 metres steeplechase	8:29.11	8 Q	—N/a		8:38.59	7
Dominik Kopeć; Remigiusz Olszewski; Przemysław Słowikowski; Krzysztof Grześkowiak; Eryk Hampel; Karol Kwiatkowski	4 × 100 metres relay	DSQ		—N/a		Did not advance	
Dariusz Kowaluk; Łukasz Krawczuk; Karol Zalewski; Kajetan Duszyński; Rafał Omelko; Mateusz Rzeźniczak	4 × 400 metres relay	3:02.75	5 q	—N/a		3:02.27	5
Artur Brzozowski	20 km walk	—N/a				DSQ	
Dawid Tomala	20 km walk	—N/a				1:25.06	19
Rafał Augustyn	50 km walk	—N/a				3:51:37	6
Adrian Błocki	50 km walk	—N/a				3:57:11	12
Rafał Sikora	50 km walk	—N/a				3:52:56	7

Field events

Athletes	Event	Qualification		Final	
Athletes	Event	Distance	Position	Distance	Position
Sylwester Bednarek	High jump	2.25	9 q	2.24	7
Maciej Grynienko	High jump	2.21	16	Did not advance	
Piotr Lisek	Pole vault	5.61	1 q	5.90 PB	4
Robert Sobera	Pole vault	5.36	25	Did not advance	
Paweł Wojciechowski	Pole vault	5.61	1 q	5.80	5
Tomasz Jaszczuk	Long jump	7.88	6 q	8.08	4
Karol Hoffmann	Triple jump	No mark		Did not advance	
Konrad Bukowiecki	Shot put	19.89	10 q	21.66 NU23R	2nd place, silver medalist(s)
Michał Haratyk	Shot put	20.59	3 Q	21.72	1st place, gold medalist(s)
Jakub Szyszkowski	Shot put	19.67	13	Did not advance	
Piotr Małachowski	Discus throw	No mark		Did not advance	
Robert Urbanek	Discus throw	62.00	14	Did not advance	
Paweł Fajdek	Hammer throw	77.86	1 Q	78.69	2nd place, silver medalist(s)
Wojciech Nowicki	Hammer throw	76.03	4 Q	80.12	1st place, gold medalist(s)
Marcin Krukowski	Javelin throw	84.35	3 Q	84.55 SB	4
Cyprian Mrzygłód	Javelin throw	83.85	4 Q	80.20	9
Bartosz Osewski	Javelin throw	74.80	21	Did not advance	

Combined events – Decathlon

Athlete	Event	100 m	LJ	SP	HJ	400 m	110H	DT	PV	JT	1500 m	Final	Rank
Paweł Wiesiołek	Result	10.95 SB	6.93	12.79	1.93	49.75	15.10	45.68	4.70	55.57	4:37.03	7696	13
Paweł Wiesiołek	Points	872	797	654	740	826	837	781	819	671	699	7696	13

Women
Track and road

Athletes	Event	Heats		Semifinal		Final	
Athletes	Event	Result	Rank	Result	Rank	Result	Rank
Ewa Swoboda	100 metres	11.33	2 Q	11.30	11	Did not advance	
Anna Kiełbasińska	200 metres	23.20	3 Q	23.29	14	Did not advance	
Martyna Kotwiła	200 metres	23.62	12 Q	23.41	16	Did not advance	
Iga Baumgart-Witan	400 metres	52.23	10 q	51.35 PB	6 Q	51.24 PB	5
Małgorzata Hołub-Kowalik	400 metres	Bye		51.74	12	Did not advance	
Justyna Święty-Ersetic	400 metres	Bye		51.23	3 Q	50.41 EL	1st place, gold medalist(s)
Anna Sabat	800 metres	2:01.67	8 q	2:00.32	3 Q	2:01.26	5
Angelika Cichocka	800 metres	2:01.01 SB	4 q	2:03.14	12	Did not advance	
Angelika Cichocka	1500 metres	4:10.04 SB	11 Q	—N/a		4:10.93	12
Sofia Ennaoui	1500 metres	4:08.60	1 Q	—N/a		4:03.08	2nd place, silver medalist(s)
Paulina Kaczyńska	5000 metres	—N/a				15:49.21	13
Katarzyna Rutkowska	5000 metres	—N/a				15:41.52	12
Katarzyna Rutkowska	10,000 metres	—N/a				DNF	
Izabela Trzaskalska	Marathon	—N/a				2:33:43	10
Karolina Kołeczek	100 metres hurdles	12.96 SB	2 Q	12.94 SB	7 q	13.11	6
Klaudia Siciarz	100 metres hurdles	Bye		13.12	16	Did not advance	
Joanna Linkiewicz	400 metres hurdles	56.66	4 Q	56.06	14	Did not advance	
Justyna Saganiak	400 metres hurdles	57.24	11 q	57.71	23	Did not advance	
Alicja Konieczek	3000 metres steeplechase	9:41.16 PB	17	—N/a		Did not advance	
Matylda Kowal	3000 metres steeplechase	9:49.27	24	—N/a		Did not advance	
Katarzyna Kowalska	3000 metres steeplechase	9:54.83	29	—N/a		Did not advance	
Ewa Swoboda; Anna Kiełbasińska; Martyna Kotwiła; Kamila Ciba; Magdalena Stefanowicz; Karolina Zagajewska	4 × 100 metres relay	43.20 SB	6 q	—N/a		43.34	6
Iga Baumgart-Witan; Małgorzata Hołub-Kowalik; Justyna Święty-Ersetic; Martyna Dąbrowska; Natalia Kaczmarek; Patrycja Wyciszkiewicz	4 × 400 metres relay	3:28.52	3 Q	—N/a		3:26.59	1st place, gold medalist(s)
Katarzyna Zdziebło	20 km walk	—N/a				1:36:01	21
Joanna Bemowska	50 km walk	—N/a				DNF	
Agnieszka Ellward	50 km walk	—N/a				DNF	

Field events

Athletes	Event	Qualification		Final	
Athletes	Event	Distance	Position	Distance	Position
Justyna Śmietanka	Pole vault	4.20	20	Did not advance	
Anna Jagaciak-Michalska	Triple jump	14.01	14	Did not advance	
Paulina Guba	Shot put	18.66	3 Q	19.33	1st place, gold medalist(s)
Klaudia Kardasz	Shot put	18.00	4 Q	18.48 NU23R	4
Daria Zabawska	Discus throw	53.94	22	Did not advance	
Joanna Fiodorow	Hammer throw	71.46	5 Q	74.00	3rd place, bronze medalist(s)
Malwina Kopron	Hammer throw	71.14	6 Q	72.20	4
Anita Włodarczyk	Hammer throw	75.10	1 Q	78.94 CR	1st place, gold medalist(s)
