= Poland at the 2024 European Athletics Championships =

- WA code: POL
- National federation: Polish Athletic Association

in Rome
- Competitors: 97
- Medals Ranked 9th: Gold 2 Silver 2 Bronze 2 Total 6

European Athletics Championships appearances
- 1934; 1938; 1946; 1950; 1954; 1958; 1962; 1966; 1969; 1971; 1974; 1978; 1982; 1986; 1990; 1994; 1998; 2002; 2006; 2010; 2012; 2014; 2016; 2018; 2022; 2024

Poland competed at the 2024 European Athletics Championships in Rome, Italy, between 7 and 12 June 2024. A delegation of 97 athletes was sent to represent the country.

== Medals ==
| Medal | Name | Event | Date |
|---|---|---|---|
| Gold | Wojciech Nowicki | Men's hammer throw | 9 June |
| Gold | Natalia Kaczmarek | Women's 400 metres | 10 June |
| Silver | Ewa Swoboda | Women's 100 metres | 9 June |
| Silver | Anita Włodarczyk | Women's hammer throw | 10 June |
| Bronze | Pia Skrzyszowska | Women's 100 metres hurdles | 8 June |
| Bronze | Michał Haratyk | Men's shot put | 8 June |

== Results ==
Poland entered the following athletes.

Key

- Q = Qualified for the next round
- q = Qualified for the next round as a fastest loser or, in field events, by position without achieving the qualifying target
- NR = National record
- PB = Personal best
- SB = Season best
- N/A = Round not applicable for the event

=== Men ===
Track and road events

| Athlete | Event | Heat | | Semifinal | | Final | |
| Athlete | Event | Result | Rank | Result | Rank | Result | Rank |
|---|---|---|---|---|---|---|---|
| Dominik Kopeć | 100 m | Bye | | 10.28 | 3 | Did not advance | |
| Oliwer Wdowik | 100 m | 10.26 | 1 q | 10.25 | 4 | Did not advance | |
| Marek Zakrzewski | 100 m | 10.36 | 6 | Did not advance | | | |
| Albert Komański | 200 m | Bye | | 1:05.76 | 8 | Did not advance | |
| Łukasz Żok | 200 m | 20.97 | 4 | Did not advance | | | |
| Patryk Wykrota | 200 m | 20.97 | 5 | Did not advance | | | |
| Karol Zalewski | 400 m | 45.80 SB | 5 q | Did not start | | | |
| Mateusz Borkowski | 800 m | 1:46.12 | 4 | Did not advance | | | |
| Filip Ostrowski | 800 m | 1:46.37 | 3 Q | 1:47.15 | 7 | Did not advance | |
| Michał Rozmys | 800 m | 1:47.46 | 7 | Did not advance | | | |
| Filip Ostrowski | 1500 m | 3:46.18 | 13 | —N/a | | Did not advance | |
| Filip Rak | 1500 m | 3:45.21 | 10 | —N/a | | Did not advance | |
| Maciej Wyderka | 1500 m | 3:40.37 | 9 | —N/a | | Did not advance | |
| Krzysztof Kiljan | 110 m hurdles | 13.78 | 2 q | DNF | | Did not advance | |
| Damian Czykier | 110 m hurdles | Bye | | 13.44 | 3 q | DNF | |
| Jakub Szymański | 110 m hurdles | 13.53 | 1 q | DQ | | Did not advance | |
| Krzysztof Hołub | 400 m hurdles | 50.42 | 6 | Did not advance | | | |
| Mateusz Kaczor | Half marathon | —N/a | | | | DNF | |
| Artur Brzozowski | 20 km walk | —N/a | | | | 1:23:05 | 15 |
| Maher Ben Hlima | 20 km walk | —N/a | | | | 1:21:12 | 7 |
| Oliwer Wdowik^{[a]} Marek Zakrzewski; Dominik Kopeć; Łukasz Żak; Łukasz Żok | 4 × 100 m relay | 38.67 SB | 3 Q | —N/a | | DNF | |
| Igor Bogaczyński; Kajetan Duszyński; Patryk Grzegorzewicz; Karol Zalewski; Daniel Sołtysiak; Maksymilian Szwed; Mateusz Rzeźniczak | 4 × 400 m relay | DQ | | —N/a | | Did not advance | |

Field events

| Athlete | Event | Qualification | | Final | |
| Athlete | Event | Distance | Position | Distance | Position |
|---|---|---|---|---|---|
| Norbert Kobielski | High jump | 2.21 | 1 q | 2.22 | 6 |
| Mateusz Kołodziejski | High jump | 2.17 | 8 | Did not advance | |
| Adrian Świderski | Triple jump | Did not start | | | |
| Piotr Lisek | Pole vault | 5.60 | 4 q | 5.75 | 6 |
| Robert Sobera | Pole vault | NM | | Did not advance | |
| Paweł Wojciechowski | Pole vault | 5.25 | 11 | Did not advance | |
| Konrad Bukowiecki | Shot put | 19.20 | 9 | Did not advance | |
| Michał Haratyk | Shot put | 19.79 | 5 q | 20.94 SB | 3rd place, bronze medalist(s) |
| Szymon Mazur | Shot put | 18.76 | 14 | Did not advance | |
| Oskar Stachnik | Discus throw | 62.52 | 4 q | 62.35 | 10 |
| Robert Urbanek | Discus throw | 60.75 | 10 | Did not advance | |
| Paweł Fajdek | Hammer throw | 75.17 | 6 q | 77.50 SB | 6 |
| Wojciech Nowicki | Hammer throw | 79.00 | 1 Q | 80.95 SB | 1st place, gold medalist(s) |
| Marcin Wrotyński | Hammer throw | 73.58 | 7 | Did not advance | |
| Dawid Piłat | Hammer throw | 71.44 | 13 | Did not advance | |
| Marcik Krukowski | Javelin throw | 81.72 | 5 q | 81.24 | 9 |
| Cyprian Mrzygłód | Javelin throw | 77.93 | 8 | Did not advance | |
| Dawid Wegner | Javelin throw | 79.35 | 7 | Did not advance | |

Combined events – Decathlon

| Athlete | Event | 100 m | LJ | SP | HJ | 400 m | 110H | DT | PV | JT | 1500 m | Final | Rank |
|---|---|---|---|---|---|---|---|---|---|---|---|---|---|
| Paweł Wiesiołek | Result | 11.04 SB | 7.35 | 14.24 | 1.90 | 50.03 SB | 15.37 | 44.23 | 4.60 | 56.11 SB | 4:42.93 SB | 7707 SB | 17 |
| Paweł Wiesiołek | Points | 852 | 898 | 743 | 714 | 813 | 805 | 751 | 790 | 679 | 662 | 7707 SB | 17 |

=== Women ===
Track and road events

| Athlete | Event | Heat | | Semifinal | | Final | |
| Athlete | Event | Result | Rank | Result | Rank | Result | Rank |
|---|---|---|---|---|---|---|---|
| Magdalena Stefanowicz | 100 m | Did not start | | | | | |
| Ewa Swoboda | 100 m | Bye | | 11.02 SB | 1 Q | 11.03 | 2nd place, silver medalist(s) |
| Martyna Kotwiła | 200 m | 23.14 SB | 4 q | 23.44 | 8 | Did not advance | |
| Krystsina Tsimanouskaya | 200 m | Bye | | 23.34 | 7 | Did not advance | |
| Marlena Granaszewska | 200 m | 23.53 | 6 | Did not advance | | | |
| Iga Baumgart-Witan | 400 m | 52.18 SB | 2 q | Did not start | | | |
| Natalia Kaczmarek | 400 m | Bye | | 50.70 | 1 Q | 48.98 EL | 1st place, gold medalist(s) |
| Justyna Święty-Ersetic | 400 m | 52.01 | 4 q | 52.18 | 8 | Did not advance | |
| Angelika Sarna | 800 m | 2:01.09 | 4 q | 2:00.37 SB | 2 Q | 2:01.21 | 8 |
| Adrianna Topolnicka | 800 m | 2:02.58 | 5 | Did not advance | | | |
| Anna Wielgosz | 800 m | 2:00.50 SB | 2 Q | 1:59.07 PB | 4 q | 1:59.99 | 6 |
| Sofia Ennaoui | 1500 m | 4:13.71 | 12 | —N/a | | Did not advance | |
| Martyna Galant | 1500 m | 4:15.31 | 10 | —N/a | | Did not advance | |
| Aleksandra Płocińska | 1500 m | 4:12.53 | 5 Q | —N/a | | 4:09.07 | 12 |
| Aleksandra Lisowska | Half Marathon | —N/a | | | | 1:12.06 PB | 29 |
| Angelika Mach | Half Marathon | —N/a | | | | 1:15.55 SB | 55 |
| Monika Jackiewicz | Half Marathon | —N/a | | | | 1:13.42 | 46 |
| Izabela Paszkiewicz | Half Marathon | —N/a | | | | 1:12.15 PB | 31 |
| Aleksandra Brzezińska | Half Marathon | —N/a | | | | 1:14.21 | 49 |
| Sabina Jarząbek | Half Marathon | —N/a | | | | 1:16.48 | 62 |
| Klaudia Wojtunik | 100 m hurdles | 13.22 | 1 q | 12.84 PB | 3 | Did not advance | |
| Pia Skrzyszowska | 100 m hurdles | Bye | | 12.62 | 2 Q | 12.42 PB | 3rd place, bronze medalist(s) |
| Klaudia Siciarz | 100 m hurdles | 12.94 SB | 2 q | 12.94 | 4 | Did not advance | |
| Marika Majewska | 100 m hurdles | 13.11 | 3 q | 13.08 | 8 | Did not advance | |
| Anna Gryc | 400 m hurdles | 56.91 =PB | 5 | Did not advance | | | |
| Izabela Smolińska | 400 m hurdles | 56.24 PB | 5 q | —N/a | | 56.78 | 8 |
| Alicja Konieczek | 3000 m steeplechase | 9:29.76 | 2 Q | —N/a | | 9:23.28 | 7 |
| Aneta Konieczek | 3000 m steeplechase | 9:41.23 | 9 | —N/a | | Did not advance | |
| Kinga Królik | 3000 m steeplechase | 9:31.84 | 4 Q | —N/a | | 9:37.63 | 13 |
| Katarzyna Zdziebło | 20 km walk | —N/a | | | | DQ | |
| Olga Chojecka | 20 km walk | —N/a | | | | 1:32:34 | 12 |
| Monika Romaszko; Ewa Swoboda; Magdalena Stefanowicz; Krystsina Tsimanouskaya | 4 × 100 m relay | 43.15 | 5 q | —N/a | | DNF | |
| Iga Baumgart-Witan; Marika Popowicz-Drapała; Justyna Święty-Ersetic^{[a]} Natalia Kaczmarek; Kinga Gacka | 4 × 400 m relay | 3:25.59 | 1 Q | —N/a | | 3:23.91 SB | 6 |

Field events

| Athlete | Event | Qualification | | Final | |
| Athlete | Event | Distance | Position | Distance | Position |
|---|---|---|---|---|---|
| Paulina Borys | High jump | 1.76 | 15 | Did not advance | |
| Magdalena Bokun | Long jump | 6.65 SB | 6 q | 6.38 | 12 |
| Nikola Horowska | Long jump | 6.46 | 10 | Did not advance | |
| Adrianna Laskowska | Triple jump | 13.26 | 13 | Did not advance | |
| Klaudia Kardasz | Shot put | 17.76 | 5 q | 17.66 | 10 |
| Zuzanna Maślana | Shot put | 16.22 | 10 | Did not advance | |
| Daria Zabawska | Discus throw | 59.02 | 7 | Did not advance | |
| Weronika Muszyńska | Discus throw | 55.62 | 10 | Did not advance | |
| Karolina Urban | Discus throw | 55.47 | 13 | Did not advance | |
| Anita Włodarczyk | Hammer throw | 71.27 | 4 q | 72.92 SB | 2nd place, silver medalist(s) |
| Katarzyna Furmanek | Hammer throw | 68.66 | 6 q | 67.50 | 11 |
| Malwina Kopron | Hammer throw | 69.13 | 3 q | 69.72 | 7 |
| Maria Andrejczyk | Javelin throw | 60.61 | 1 Q | 58.29 | 10 |
| Marcelina Witek-Konofał | Javelin throw | 57.73 | 7 q | 55.42 | 12 |

Combined events – Heptathlon

| Athlete | Event | 100H | HJ | SP | 200 m | LJ | JT | 800 m | Final | Rank |
|---|---|---|---|---|---|---|---|---|---|---|
| Paulina Ligarska | Result | 13.96 | 1.71 | 14.51 | 24.96 | 6.07 SB | 40.64 | 2:13.52 SB | 6034 | 12 |
| Paulina Ligarska | Points | 984 | 867 | 828 | 890 | 871 | 680 | 914 | 6034 | 12 |

=== Mixed ===
Track and road events

| Athlete | Event | Semifinal | | Final | |
| Athlete | Event | Result | Rank | Result | Rank |
|---|---|---|---|---|---|
| Karol Zalewski; Marika Popowicz-Drapała; Maksymilian Szwed; Aleksandra Formella | 4 × 100 metres relay | —N/a | | 3:15.32 | 7 |

^{a} Athletes who participated in the heats only.
