= 2021 European Athletics U23 Championships – Women's hammer throw =

Women's hammer throw at the 2021 European Athletics U23 Championships
- Venue: Kadriorg Stadium, Tallinn
- Dates: 8, 10 July
- Competitors: 21 from 16 nations
- Winning distance: 68.80

Medalists
gold medal	Samantha Borutta	Germany
silver medal	Katrine Koch Jacobsen	Denmark
bronze medal	Kiira Väänänen	Finland

The women's hammer throw event at the 2021 European Athletics U23 Championships was held in Tallinn, Estonia, at Kadriorg Stadium on 8 and 10 July.

== Records ==
Prior to the competition, the records were as follows:

European U23 record	Tatyana Lysenko (RUS)	77.06	Moscow, Russia	15 July 2005
Championship U23 record	Alexandra Tavernier (FRA)	72.98	Tallinn, Estonia	10 July 2015

== Results ==
=== Qualification ===
Qualification rule: 65.00 (Q) or the 12 best results (q) qualified for the final.

Rank	Group	Name	Nationality	#1	#2	#3	Results	Notes
1	A	Samantha Borutta	Germany	65.12			65.12	Q
2	A	Valeriya Ivanenko	Ukraine	63.54	63.01	64.46	64.46	q, SB
3	A	Ewa Różańska	Poland	63.63	x	61.45	63.63	q
4	B	Cecilia Desideri	Italy	60.84	63.57	x	63.57	q
5	B	Tara Simpson-Sullivan	Great Britain	63.27	55.97	62.57	63.27	q
6	B	Kiira Väänänen	Finland	62.07	63.22	62.47	63.22	q
7	B	Sara Forssell	Sweden	59.70	61.58	62.42	62.42	q
8	B	Tatsiana Ramanovich	Belarus	62.13	58.96	61.21	62.13	q
9	B	Katrine Koch Jacobsen	Denmark	x	61.94	x	61.94	q
10	A	Anna Purchase	Great Britain	x	61.59	x	61.59	q
11	B	Judith Essemiah	Netherlands	x	59.63	61.11	61.11	q
12	A	Lise Lotte Jepsen	Denmark	x	x	60.73	60.73	q
13	A	Natalia Sánchez	Spain	59.42	60.59	60.34	60.59	
14	B	Ana Adela Stanciu	Romania	x	60.20	59.30	60.20	
15	A	Sara Killinen	Finland	x	x	59.63	59.63	
16	B	Zsanett Németh	Hungary	59.49	57.54	58.92	59.49	
17	B	Olena Khamaza	Ukraine	59.48	x	x	59.48	
18	A	Stavroula Kosmidou	Germany	57.33	58.96	x	58.96	
19	A	Nino Tsikvadze	Georgia	56.74	x	x	56.74	
20	A	Annika Emily Kelly	Estonia	x	53.29	54.15	54.15	
21	A	Lina Čater	Slovenia	51.74	x	53.95	53.95	

=== Final ===
Rank	Name	Nationality	#1	#2	#3	#4	#5	#6	Result	Notes
1st place, gold medalist(s)	Samantha Borutta	Germany	68.10	68.02	64.29	67.74	68.80	68.28	68.80	
2nd place, silver medalist(s)	Katrine Koch Jacobsen	Denmark	x	x	66.81	x	x	66.50	66.81	
3rd place, bronze medalist(s)	Kiira Väänänen	Finland	64.74	63.30	65.98	63.58	63.50	63.57	65.98	PB
4	Anna Purchase	Great Britain	62.27	65.11	x	x	62.33	x	65.11	
5	Tara Simpson-Sullivan	Great Britain	63.82	64.84	x	63.31	x	x	64.84	
6	Sara Forssell	Sweden	64.42	59.30	64.69	64.18	63.94	62.21	64.69	PB
7	Ewa Różańska	Poland	x	64.23	62.49	64.25	62.95	x	64.25	
8	Cecilia Desideri	Italy	64.12	61.03	x	x	x	60.72	64.12	
9	Valeriya Ivanenko	Ukraine	62.87	x	62.87				62.87	
10	Judith Essemiah	Netherlands	60.92	x	61.64				61.64	
11	Lise Lotte Jepsen	Denmark	60.84	x	57.13				60.84	
	Tatsiana Ramanovich	Belarus	x	x	x				NM	
