= Poland at the 2014 European Athletics Championships =

- WA code: POL
- National federation: Polish Athletic Association
- Website: www.pzla.pl

in Zürich
- Competitors: 61 (41 men and 20 women) in 34 events
- Medals Ranked 6th: Gold 2 Silver 5 Bronze 5 Total 12

European Athletics Championships appearances
- 1934; 1938; 1946; 1950; 1954; 1958; 1962; 1966; 1969; 1971; 1974; 1978; 1982; 1986; 1990; 1994; 1998; 2002; 2006; 2010; 2012; 2014; 2016; 2018; 2022; 2024

Poland competed at the 2014 European Athletics Championships in Zürich, Switzerland, from 12–17 August 2014. A delegation of 61 athletes were sent to represent the country.

== Medals ==
| Medal | Name | Event | Date |
|---|---|---|---|
| Gold | Adam Kszczot | Men's 800 metres | 15 August |
| Gold | Anita Włodarczyk | Women's hammer throw | 15 August |
| Silver | Yared Shegumo | Marathon | 17 August |
| Silver | Paweł Wojciechowski | Men's pole vault | 16 August |
| Silver | Paweł Fajdek | Men's hammer throw | 16 August |
| Silver | Artur Kuciapski | Men's 800 metres | 15 August |
| Silver | Krystian Zalewski | Men's 3000 metres steeplechase | 14 August |
| Bronze | Tomasz Majewski | Men's shot put | 13 August |
| Bronze | Robert Urbanek | Men's discus throw | 13 August |
| Bronze | Joanna Fiodorow | Women's hammer throw | 15 August |
| Bronze | Joanna Jóźwik | Women's 800 metres | 16 August |
| Bronze | Rafał Omelko; Kacper Kozłowski; Łukasz Krawczuk; Jakub Krzewina | Men's 4 × 400 metres relay | 17 August |
