= Aleksey Reunkov =

Russian long-distance runner

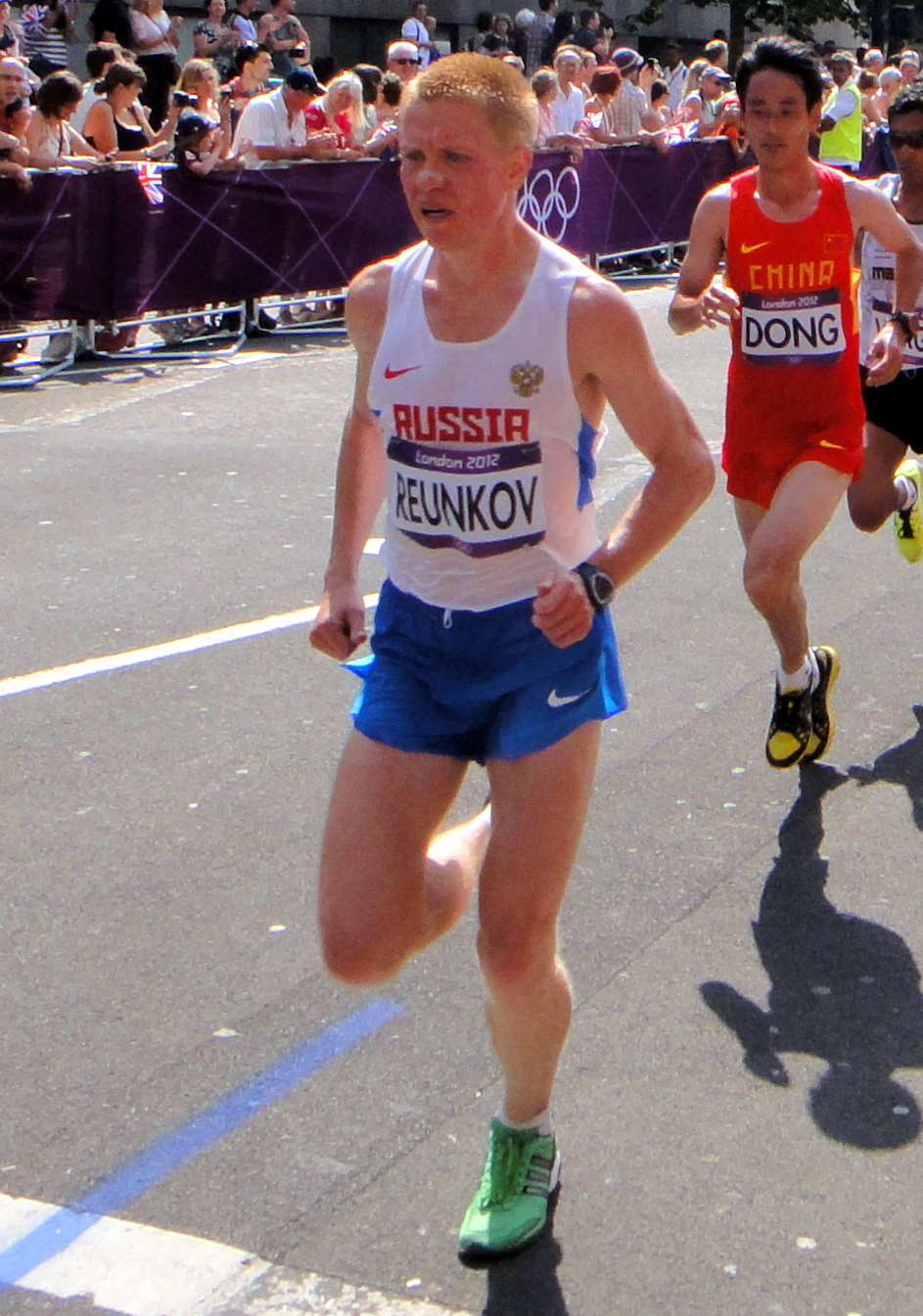
- Aleksey Reunkov in the marathon at the 2012 Olympics in London

Personal information
- Born: January 28, 1984 (age 42)
- Height: 1.76 m (5 ft 9 1/2 in)
- Weight: 63 kg (139 lb)

Sport
- Country: Russia
- Sport: Athletics
- Event: Marathon
Medal record
European Championships
Bronze medal – third place	2014 Zürich	Marathon

Aleksey Reunkov (Russian: Алексей Михайлович Реунко́в; born January 28, 1984) is a Russian long-distance runner. At the 2012 Summer Olympics, he competed in the Men's marathon, finishing in 14th place. He also took part in the 2015 London Marathon, finishing in 10th overall.
