= Poland at the 1982 European Athletics Championships =

- WA code: POL
- National federation: Polish Athletic Association

in Athens
- Competitors: 37
- Medals Ranked 8th: Gold 1 Silver 2 Bronze 1 Total 4

European Athletics Championships appearances
- 1934; 1938; 1946; 1950; 1954; 1958; 1962; 1966; 1969; 1971; 1974; 1978; 1982; 1986; 1990; 1994; 1998; 2002; 2006; 2010; 2012; 2014; 2016; 2018; 2022; 2024; 2026

Poland competed at the 1982 European Athletics Championships in Athens, Greece, from 6–12 September 1982. A delegation of 34 athletes were sent to represent the country.

== Medals ==
Medal	Name	Event
Gold	Lucyna Kałek	Women's 100 metres hurdles
Silver	Bogusław Mamiński	Men's 3000 metres steeplechase
Silver	Janusz Trzepizur	Men's high jump
Bronze	Marian Woronin	Men's 100 metres
