= Poland at the 2016 European Athletics Championships =

- WA code: POL
- National federation: PZLA
- Website: www.pzla.pl

in Amsterdam
- Competitors: 67 (36 men and 31 women) in 35 events
- Medals Ranked 1st: Gold 6 Silver 5 Bronze 1 Total 12

European Athletics Championships appearances
- 1934; 1938; 1946; 1950; 1954; 1958; 1962; 1966; 1969; 1971; 1974; 1978; 1982; 1986; 1990; 1994; 1998; 2002; 2006; 2010; 2012; 2014; 2016; 2018; 2022; 2024

Poland competed at the 2016 European Athletics Championships in Amsterdam, Netherlands, from 6–10 July 2016. A delegation of 67 athletes were sent to represent the country.

== Medals ==
Medal	Name	Event	Date
Gold	Anita Włodarczyk	Women's hammer throw	7 July
Gold	Robert Sobera	Men's pole vault	8 July
Gold	Piotr Małachowski	Men's discus throw	9 July
Gold	Angelika Cichocka	Women's 1500 m	10 July
Gold	Paweł Fajdek	Men's hammer throw	10 July
Gold	Adam Kszczot	Men's 800 m	10 July
Silver	Karol Hoffmann	Men's triple jump	9 July
Silver	Joanna Linkiewicz	Women's 400 m hurdles	10 July
Silver	Michał Haratyk	Men's shot put	10 July
Silver	Marcin Lewandowski	Men's 800 m	10 July
Silver	Łukasz Krawczuk; Kacper Kozłowski; Jakub Krzewina; Rafał Omelko	Men's 4 × 400 m relay	10 July
Bronze	Wojciech Nowicki	Men's hammer throw	10 July

== Results ==
=== Men ===
Track & road events

Athlete	Event	Heat		Semifinal		Final	
Athlete	Event	Result	Rank	Result	Rank	Result	Rank
Remigiusz Olszewski	100 m	10.46	16 q	10.56	23	did not advance	
Przemysław Słowikowski	100 m	10.35 PB	9 q	10.27 PB	15	did not advance	
Karol Zalewski	200 m	20.69	3 Q	20.69	10	did not advance	
Łukasz Krawczuk	400 m	46.94	8 Q	45.86	12	did not advance	
Jakub Krzewina	400 m	47.09	12 Q	46.50	21	did not advance	
Rafał Omelko	400 m	Bye		45.14 PB	3 Q	45.67	6
Adam Kszczot	800 m	1:49.38	14 Q	1:46.32	1 Q	1:45.18	1st place, gold medalist(s)
Marcin Lewandowski	800 m	1:50.32	22 Q	1:47.16	5 Q	1:45.54	2nd place, silver medalist(s)
Dominik Bochenek	110 m hurdles	13.87	14	did not advance			
Damian Czykier	110 m hurdles	Bye		13.32 PB	5 q	13.40	4
Patryk Adamczyk	400 m hurdles	51.00	10 Q	50.12	18	did not advance	
Robert Bryliński	400 m hurdles	50.74	7 q	50.42	19	did not advance	
Jakub Smoliński	400 m hurdles	53.27	25	did not advance			
Krystian Zalewski	3000 m steeplechase	8:31.50	2 Q	—		did not start	
Grzegorz Zimniewicz; Przemysław Słowikowski; Adam Pawłowski; Karol Zalewski	4 × 100 m relay	38.64	4 Q	—		38.69	6
Łukasz Krawczuk; Kacper Kozłowski; Jakub Krzewina; Rafał Omelko (only in final); Michał Pietrzak (only in heats)	4 × 400 m relay	3:02.09	2 Q	—		3:01.18	2nd place, silver medalist(s)
Marcin Chabowski	Half marathon	—				1:02:54 SB	4
Szymon Kulka	Half marathon	—				1:04:47	16

Field events

Athlete	Event	Qualification		Final	
Athlete	Event	Distance	Position	Distance	Position
Sylwester Bednarek	High jump	2.23	16	did not advance	
Konrad Bukowiecki	Shot put	20.65	2 Q	20.58	4
Michał Haratyk	Shot put	20.45	3 Q	21.19	2nd place, silver medalist(s)
Paweł Fajdek	Hammer throw	78.82	1 Q	80.93	1st place, gold medalist(s)
Wojciech Nowicki	Hammer throw	75.85	3 Q	77.53	3rd place, bronze medalist(s)
Łukasz Grzeszczuk	Javelin throw	81.05	10 q	76.41	11
Marcin Krukowski	Javelin throw	81.88	7 Q	79.49	6
Kacper Oleszczuk	Javelin throw	80.97	11 q	79.34	8
Karol Hoffmann	Triple jump	16.93	1 Q	17.16 PB	2nd place, silver medalist(s)
Piotr Lisek	Pole vault	5.35	12 q	5.50	4
Robert Sobera	Pole vault	5.50	2 q	5.60	1st place, gold medalist(s)
Paweł Wojciechowski	Pole vault	5.35	12 q	5.30	7
Piotr Małachowski	Discus throw	64.15	10 Q	67.06	1st place, gold medalist(s)
Bartłomiej Stój	Discus throw	61.30	21	did not advance	
Robert Urbanek	Discus throw	64.28	8 Q	62.18	9

Combined events – Decathlon

Athlete	Event	100	LJ	SP	HJ	400 m	110H	DT	PV	JT	1500 m	Final	Rank
Paweł Wiesiołek	Result	10.93	NM	NM	—	—	—	—	—	—	—	DNF	
Paweł Wiesiołek	Points	876	0	0	—	—	—	—	—	—	—	DNF	

=== Women ===
Track & road events

Athlete	Event	Heat		Semifinal		Final	
Athlete	Event	Result	Rank	Result	Rank	Result	Rank
Emilia Ankiewicz	400 m hurdles	56.43 PB	2 Q	56.05 PB	8 q	57.31	8
Angelika Cichocka	800 m	Did not start		Did not advance			
Angelika Cichocka	1500 m	4:13.47	10 Q	—		4:33.00	1st place, gold medalist(s)
Sofia Ennaoui	800 m	Did not start		Did not advance			
Sofia Ennaoui	1500 m	4:10.99	3 Q	—		4:34.84	7
Agata Forkasiewicz	200 m	23.53 PB	4 q	23.59	7	Did not advance	
Małgorzata Hołub	400 m	BYE		51.67 PB	4 Q	51.89	5
Joanna Jóźwik	800 m	2:04.62	3 Q	2:01.52	1 Q	2:00.57	6
Anna Kiełbasińska	200 m	23.21	2 Q	23.36	5	Did not advance	
Klaudia Konopko	200 m	23.73	5	Did not advance			
Matylda Kowal	3000 m steeplechase	9:46.25	5 Q	—		9:57.27	15
Karolina Kołeczek	100 m hurdles	13.06	2 Q	13.09	15	Did not advance	
Joanna Linkiewicz	400 m hurdles	BYE		55.74	3 Q	55.33	2nd place, silver medalist(s)
Tina Matusińska	400 m hurdles	59.22	22	Did not advance			
Agnieszka Mierzejewska	Half marathon	—				1:12:10	9
Dominika Napieraj	Half marathon	—				Did not finish	
Marika Popowicz-Drapała	100 m	11.61	4 Q	11.68	21	Did not advance	
Justyna Święty	400 m	BYE		52.34	8 q	51.96	6
Danuta Urbanik	1500 m	4:14.86	15	Did not advance			
Patrycja Wyciszkiewicz	400 m	52.79	2 Q	52.92	18	Did not advance	
Agata Forkasiewicz; Marika Popowicz-Drapała; Anna Kiełbasińska; Ewa Swoboda	4 × 100 m relay	43.59	8 q	—		43.24	7
Ewelina Ptak; Małgorzata Hołub; Patrycja Wyciszkiewicz; Justyna Święty; Martyna Dąbrowska * Iga Baumgart *	4 × 400 m relay	3:27.72	2 Q	—		3:27.60	4

Field events

Athlete	Event	Qualification		Final	
Athlete	Event	Distance	Position	Distance	Position
Maria Andrejczyk	Javelin throw	57.93	13	Did not advance	
Paulina Guba	Shot put	17.44	7 Q	16.95	11
Joanna Fiodorow	Hammer throw	69.35	8 q	69.48	10
Anna Jagaciak-Michalska	Triple jump	14.33	1 Q	14.40	4
Malwina Kopron	Hammer throw	69.23	9 q	70.91	6
Justyna Śmietanka	Pole vault	4.20	21	Did not advance	
Marcelina Witek	Javelin throw	55.03	22	Did not advance	
Anita Włodarczyk	Hammer throw	73.94	1 Q	78.14	1st place, gold medalist(s)

Combined events – Heptathlon

Athlete	Event	100H	HJ	SP	200 m	LJ	JT	800 m	Final	Rank
Karolina Tymińska	Result	DNF	DNS	—	—	—	—	—	DNF	
Karolina Tymińska	Points	0	0	—	—	—	—	—	DNF	
