= Poland at the 1978 European Athletics Championships =

- WA code: POL
- National federation: Polish Athletic Association

in Prague
- Competitors: 46
- Medals Ranked 5th: Gold 2 Silver 2 Bronze 3 Total 7

European Athletics Championships appearances
- 1934; 1938; 1946; 1950; 1954; 1958; 1962; 1966; 1969; 1971; 1974; 1978; 1982; 1986; 1990; 1994; 1998; 2002; 2006; 2010; 2012; 2014; 2016; 2018; 2022; 2024; 2026

Poland competed at the 1978 European Athletics Championships in Prague, Czechoslovakia, from 29 August – 3 September 1978. A delegation of 46 athletes were sent to represent the country. Poland won seven medals at the Championships.

== Medals ==
| Medal | Name | Event |
|---|---|---|
| Gold | Bronisław Malinowski | Men's 3,000m steeplechase |
| Gold | Zenon Nowosz; Zenon Licznerski; Leszek Dunecki; Marian Woronin | Men's 4 × 100 m relay |
| Silver | Jan Pusty | Men's 110m hurdles |
| Silver | Jerzy Włodarczyk; Zbigniew Jaremski; Cezary Łapiński; Ryszard Podlas | Men's 4 × 400 m relay |
| Bronze | Jan Ornoch | Men's 50km walk |
| Bronze | Irena Szewińska | Women's 400m |
| Bronze | Małgorzata Grajewska; Krystyna Kacperczyk; Genowefa Błaszak; Irena Szewińska | Women's 4 × 400 m relay |
