= Poland at the 1938 European Athletics Championships =

- WA code: POL
- National federation: Polish Athletic Association

in Paris
- Competitors: 15
- Medals Ranked 5th: Gold 2 Silver 3 Bronze 1 Total 6

European Athletics Championships appearances
- 1934; 1938; 1946; 1950; 1954; 1958; 1962; 1966; 1969; 1971; 1974; 1978; 1982; 1986; 1990; 1994; 1998; 2002; 2006; 2010; 2012; 2014; 2016; 2018; 2022; 2024; 2026

Poland competed at the 1938 European Athletics Championships in Paris, France, from 3–5 September 1938. A delegation of 15 athletes were sent to represent the country.

== Medals ==
Medal	Name	Event
Gold	Stanisława Walasiewicz	Women's 100 metres
Gold	Stanisława Walasiewicz	Women's 200 metres
Silver	Witold Gerutto	Men's decathlon
Silver	Stanisława Walasiewicz	Women's long jump
Silver	Barbara Książkiewicz; Otylia Kałuża; Jadwiga Gawrońska; Stanisława Walasiewicz	Women's 4 × 100 metres relay
Bronze	Wanda Flakowicz	Women's shot put
