= Poland at the 1969 European Athletics Championships =

- WA code: POL
- National federation: Polish Athletic Association

in Athens
- Competitors: 52
- Medals: Gold 2 Silver 0 Bronze 5 Total 7

European Athletics Championships appearances
- 1934; 1938; 1946; 1950; 1954; 1958; 1962; 1966; 1969; 1971; 1974; 1978; 1982; 1986; 1990; 1994; 1998; 2002; 2006; 2010; 2012; 2014; 2016; 2018; 2022; 2024; 2026

Poland competed at the 1969 European Athletics Championships in Athens, Greece, from 16 to 21 September 1969. A delegation of 52 athletes were sent to represent the country.

== Medals ==
Medal	Name	Event
Gold	Jan Werner	Men's 400 metres
Gold	Mirosława Sarna	Women's long jump
Bronze	Zenon Nowosz	Men's 200 metres
Bronze	Stanisław Grędziński	Men's 400 metres
Bronze	Henryk Szordykowski	Men's 1500 metres
Bronze	Janusz Sidło	Men's javelin throw
Bronze	Teresa Nowak	Women's 100 metres hurdles
