= 2014 European Athletics Championships – Men's marathon =

Men's marathon at the European Athletics Championships

The men's marathon at the 2014 European Athletics Championships took place at the Letzigrund on 17 August.

== Medalists ==
Gold	Daniele Meucci; Italy
Silver	Yared Shegumo; Poland
Bronze	Aleksey Reunkov; Russia

== Records ==
Standing records prior to the 2014 European Athletics Championships
World record	Wilson Kipsang Kiprotich (KEN)	2:03:23	Berlin, Germany	29 September 2013
European record	Benoît Zwierzchiewski (FRA)	2:06.36	Paris, France	6 April 2003
Championship record	Martín Fiz (ESP)	2:10:31	Helsinki, Finland	14 August 1994
World Leading	Wilson Kipsang Kiprotich (KEN)	2:04:29	London, Great Britain	13 April 2014
European Leading	Mo Farah (GBR)	2:08:21	London, Great Britain	13 April 2014

== Schedule ==
Date	Time	Round
17 August 2014	09:00	Final

All times are local times (UTC+2)

== Results ==
=== Final ===
Rank	Athlete	Nationality	Time	Notes
1st place, gold medalist(s)	Daniele Meucci	Italy	2:11:08	PB
2nd place, silver medalist(s)	Yared Shegumo	Poland	2:12:00	
3rd place, bronze medalist(s)	Aleksey Reunkov	Russia	2:12:15	
4	Javier Guerra	Spain	2:12:32	
5	Viktor Röthlin	Switzerland	2:13:07	
6	Abdellatif Meftah	France	2:13:16	
7	Ruggero Pertile	Italy	2:14:18	
8	André Pollmächer	Germany	2:14:51	
9	Tadesse Abraham	Switzerland	2:15:05	
10	Ricardo Ribas	Portugal	2:15:43	
11	Stepan Kiselev	Russia	2:15:45	
12	Valērijs Žolnerovičs	Latvia	2:15:56	SB
13	Jean-Damascene Habarurema	France	2:16:04	
14	Abdelhadi El Hachimi	Belgium	2:16:35	
15	Benjamin Malaty	France	2:17:09	
16	El Hassane Ben Lkhainouch	France	2:17:54	
17	Lars Budolfsen	Denmark	2:17:54	
18	Roman Fosti	Estonia	2:17:54	PB
19	Henrik Them Andersen	Denmark	2:17:55	
20	Sean Hehir	Ireland	2:17:59	
21	Sergey Rybin	Russia	2:18:04	
22	Jesper Faurschou	Denmark	2:18:12	
23	Christian Kreienbühl	Switzerland	2:18:36	
24	Ihor Russ	Ukraine	2:19:19	
25	Mustafa Mohamed	Sweden	2:19:29	
26	Fatih Bilgiç	Turkey	2:19:49	PB
27	Ivan Babaryka	Ukraine	2:20:19	
28	Kevin Seaward	Ireland	2:20:30	
29	Ihor Olefirenko	Ukraine	2:20:36	
30	Ruben Indongo	France	2:20:39	
31	Koen Raymaekers	Netherlands	2:20:49	
32	Michele Palamini	Italy	2:21:32	
33	Håkon Brox	Norway	2:21:47	PB
34	Kári Steinn Karlsson	Iceland	2:21:56	
35	Thomas Frazer	Ireland	2:22:33	
36	Olfert Molenhuis	Netherlands	2:22:45	
37	Michael Ott	Switzerland	2:22:51	
38	Fredrik Johansson	Sweden	2:23:10	
39	José Moreira	Portugal	2:24:23	
40	Yimharan Yosef	Israel	2:24:26	
41	Berihun Wuve	Israel	2:24:39	
42	Ronald Schröer	Netherlands	2:24:51	
43	Błażej Brzeziński	Poland	2:25:17	
44	Patrick Wieser	Switzerland	2:25:33	
45	Christian Pflügl	Austria	2:25:51	
46	Adrian Lehmann	Switzerland	2:26:37	
47	Emil Lerdahl	Sweden	2:27:17	
48	Peter Bech	Denmark	2:28:38	
49	Mehmet Çağlayan	Turkey	2:30:16	
50	Amir Ramon	Israel	2:30:45	
	Dmytro Baranovskyy	Ukraine	DNF	
	Muzaffer Bayram	Turkey	DNF	
	Urige Buta	Norway	DNF	
	Marcin Chabowski	Poland	DNF	
	Patrik Engström	Sweden	DNF	
	Hermano Ferreira	Portugal	DNF	
	Marius Ionescu	Romania	DNF	
	Andrea Lalli	Italy	DNF	
	Ercan Muslu	Turkey	DNF	
	Ilja Nikolajev	Estonia	DNF	
	Iolo Nikolov	Bulgaria	DNF	
	David Nilsson	Sweden	DNF	
	Hasan Pak	Turkey	DNF	
	Liberato Pellecchia	Italy	DNF	
	Domenico Ricatti	Italy	DNF	
	Rui Pedro Silva	Portugal	DNF	
	Aleksey Sokolov	Russia	DNF	
	Henryk Szost	Poland	DNF	
	Daniel Woldu	Sweden	DNF	
	Zohar Zimro	Israel	DNF	
	Paul Pollock	Ireland	DNS	
	Hugo van den Broek	Netherlands	DNS	
