= Poland at the 1934 European Athletics Championships =

- WA code: POL
- National federation: Polish Athletic Association

in Turin
- Competitors: 5
- Medals Ranked 11th: Gold 0 Silver 1 Bronze 1 Total 2

European Athletics Championships appearances
- 1934; 1938; 1946; 1950; 1954; 1958; 1962; 1966; 1969; 1971; 1974; 1978; 1982; 1986; 1990; 1994; 1998; 2002; 2006; 2010; 2012; 2014; 2016; 2018; 2022; 2024; 2026

Poland competed at the 1934 European Athletics Championships in Turin, Italy, from 7–9 September 1934. A delegation of 5 athletes were sent to represent the country.

== Medals ==
Medal	Name	Event
Silver	Janusz Kusociński	Men's 5000 metres
Bronze	Jerzy Pławczyk	Men's decathlon
