= Poland at the 2002 European Athletics Championships =

- WA code: POL
- National federation: Polish Athletic Association
- Website: www.pzla.pl

in Munich
- Competitors: 55
- Medals Ranked 10th: Gold 1 Silver 2 Bronze 4 Total 7

European Athletics Championships appearances
- 1934; 1938; 1946; 1950; 1954; 1958; 1962; 1966; 1969; 1971; 1974; 1978; 1982; 1986; 1990; 1994; 1998; 2002; 2006; 2010; 2012; 2014; 2016; 2018; 2022; 2024; 2026

Poland competed at the 2002 European Athletics Championships in Munich, Germany, from 6–11 August 2002. A delegation of 55 athletes were sent to represent the country.

== Medals ==
Medal	Name	Event
Gold	Robert Korzeniowski	Men's 50 kilometres walk
Silver	Kamila Skolimowska	Women's hammer throw
Silver	Ryszard Pilarczyk; Łukasz Chyła; Marcin Nowak; Marcin Urbaś; Piotr Balcerzak	Men's 4 × 100 metres relay
Bronze	Artur Kohutek	Men's 110 metres hurdles
Bronze	Paweł Januszewski	Men's 400 metres hurdles
Bronze	Anna Olichwierczuk	Women's 400 metres hurdles
Bronze	Zuzanna Radecka; Grażyna Prokopek; Małgorzata Pskit; Anna Olichwierczuk; Justyna Karolkiewicz	Women's 4 × 400 metres relay
