= Poland at the 1998 European Athletics Championships =

- WA code: POL
- National federation: Polish Athletic Association
- Website: www.pzla.pl

in Budapest
- Competitors: 59
- Medals Ranked 4th: Gold 3 Silver 4 Bronze 1 Total 8

European Athletics Championships appearances
- 1934; 1938; 1946; 1950; 1954; 1958; 1962; 1966; 1969; 1971; 1974; 1978; 1982; 1986; 1990; 1994; 1998; 2002; 2006; 2010; 2012; 2014; 2016; 2018; 2022; 2024

Poland competed at the 1998 European Athletics Championships in Budapest, Hungary, from 18 to 23 August 1998. A delegation of 59 athletes were sent to represent the country.

== Medals ==
Medal	Name	Event
Gold	Paweł Januszewski	Men's 400 metres hurdles
Gold	Robert Korzeniowski	Men's 50 kilometres walk
Gold	Artur Partyka	Men's high jump
Silver	Robert Maćkowiak	Men's 400 metres
Silver	Donata Jancewicz	Women's high jump
Silver	Urszula Włodarczyk	Women's heptathlon
Silver	Piotr Rysiukiewicz; Tomasz Czubak; Piotr Haczek; Robert Maćkowiak	Men's 4 × 400 metres relay
Bronze	Marcin Krzywański; Marcin Nowak; Piotr Balcerzak; Ryszard Pilarczyk	Men's 4 × 100 metres relay
