= Poland at the 2012 European Athletics Championships =

- WA code: POL
- National federation: Polish Athletic Association
- Website: www.pzla.pl

in Helsinki
- Competitors: 57 (33 men and 24 women)
- Medals Ranked 14th: Gold 1 Silver 0 Bronze 3 Total 4

European Athletics Championships appearances
- 1934; 1938; 1946; 1950; 1954; 1958; 1962; 1966; 1969; 1971; 1974; 1978; 1982; 1986; 1990; 1994; 1998; 2002; 2006; 2010; 2012; 2014; 2016; 2018; 2022; 2024

Poland competed at the 2012 European Athletics Championships in Helsinki, Finland, from 27 June to 1 July 2012. A delegation of 57 athletes (24 women and 33 men) represented the country at the championships.

== Medals ==
Medal	Name	Event	Date
Gold	Anita Włodarczyk	Women's hammer throw	1 July
Bronze	Szymon Ziółkowski	Men's hammer throw	30 June
Bronze	Artur Noga	Men's 110 metres hurdles	1 July
Bronze	Marika Popowicz; Daria Korczyńska; Marta Jeschke; Ewelina Ptak	Women's 4 × 100 metres relay	1 July
