= Poland at the 1966 European Athletics Championships =

- WA code: POL
- National federation: Polish Athletic Association

in Budapest
- Competitors: 56
- Medals Ranked 2nd: Gold 7 Silver 5 Bronze 3 Total 15

European Athletics Championships appearances
- 1934; 1938; 1946; 1950; 1954; 1958; 1962; 1966; 1969; 1971; 1974; 1978; 1982; 1986; 1990; 1994; 1998; 2002; 2006; 2010; 2012; 2014; 2016; 2018; 2022; 2024

Poland competed at the 1966 European Athletics Championships in Budapest, Hungary, from 30 August – 4 September 1966. A delegation of 56 athletes were sent to represent the country.

== Medals ==
Medal	Name	Event
Gold	Wiesław Maniak	Men's 100 metres
Gold	Stanisław Grędziński	Men's 400 metres
Gold	Ewa Kłobukowska	Women's 100 metres
Gold	Irena Kirszenstein	Women's 200 metres
Gold	Irena Kirszenstein	Women's long jump
Gold	Elżbieta Bednarek; Danuta Straszyńska; Irena Kirszenstein; Ewa Kłobukowska	Women's 4 × 100 metres relay
Gold	Jan Werner; Edmund Borowski; Stanisław Grędziński; Andrzej Badeński	Men's 4 × 400 metres relay
Silver	Marian Dudziak	Men's 200 metres
Silver	Andrzej Badeński	Men's 400 metres
Silver	Władysław Nikiciuk	Men's javelin throw
Silver	Irena Kirszenstein	Women's 100 metres
Silver	Ewa Kłobukowska	Women's 200 metres
Bronze	Władysław Komar	Men's shot put
Bronze	Elżbieta Bednarek	Women's 80 metres hurdles
Bronze	Jarosława Bieda	Men's high jump
