= Poland at the 1954 European Athletics Championships =

- WA code: POL
- National federation: Polish Athletic Association

in Bern
- Competitors: 35
- Medals Ranked 8th: Gold 1 Silver 1 Bronze 1 Total 3

European Athletics Championships appearances
- 1934; 1938; 1946; 1950; 1954; 1958; 1962; 1966; 1969; 1971; 1974; 1978; 1982; 1986; 1990; 1994; 1998; 2002; 2006; 2010; 2012; 2014; 2016; 2018; 2022; 2024

Poland competed at the 1954 European Athletics Championships in Bern, Switzerland, from 25–29 August 1954. A delegation of 35 athletes were sent to represent the country.

== Medals ==
Medal	Name	Event
Gold	Janusz Sidło	Men's javelin throw
Silver	Zbigniew Iwański	Men's long jump
Bronze	Elżbieta Duńska	Women's long jump
