= Poland at the 1950 European Athletics Championships =

- WA code: POL
- National federation: Polish Athletic Association

in Brussels
- Competitors: 3
- Medals: Gold 0 Silver 0 Bronze 0 Total 0

European Athletics Championships appearances
- 1934; 1938; 1946; 1950; 1954; 1958; 1962; 1966; 1969; 1971; 1974; 1978; 1982; 1986; 1990; 1994; 1998; 2002; 2006; 2010; 2012; 2014; 2016; 2018; 2022; 2024

Poland competed at the 1950 European Athletics Championships in Brussels, Belgium, from 23–27 August 1950. A delegation of 3 athletes were sent to represent the country. Polish athletes did not achieve any medal first time in history.
