= Poland at the 1994 European Athletics Championships =

- WA code: POL
- National federation: Polish Athletic Association

in Helsinki
- Competitors: 37
- Medals Ranked 17th: Gold 0 Silver 1 Bronze 1 Total 2

European Athletics Championships appearances
- 1934; 1938; 1946; 1950; 1954; 1958; 1962; 1966; 1969; 1971; 1974; 1978; 1982; 1986; 1990; 1994; 1998; 2002; 2006; 2010; 2012; 2014; 2016; 2018; 2022; 2024

Poland competed at the 1994 European Athletics Championships in Helsinki, Finland, from 9–14 August 1994. A delegation of 37 athletes were sent to represent the country.

== Medals ==
Medal	Name	Event
Silver	Artur Partyka	Men's high jump
Bronze	Urszula Włodarczyk	Women's heptathlon
