= Poland at the 1986 European Athletics Championships =

- WA code: POL
- National federation: Polish Athletic Association

in Stuttgart
- Competitors: 34
- Medals Ranked 17th: Gold 0 Silver 0 Bronze 1 Total 1

European Athletics Championships appearances
- 1934; 1938; 1946; 1950; 1954; 1958; 1962; 1966; 1969; 1971; 1974; 1978; 1982; 1986; 1990; 1994; 1998; 2002; 2006; 2010; 2012; 2014; 2016; 2018; 2022; 2024

Poland competed at the 1986 European Athletics Championships in Stuttgart, West Germany, from 26 to 31 August 1986. A delegation of 34 athletes were sent to represent the country.

== Medals ==
Medal	Name	Event
Bronze	Ewa Kasprzyk; Marzena Wojdecka; Elżbieta Kapusta; Genowefa Błaszak	Women's 4 × 400 metres relay
