= Poland at the 1971 European Athletics Championships =

- WA code: POL
- National federation: Polish Athletic Association

in Helsinki
- Competitors: 65
- Medals: Gold 1 Silver 3 Bronze 5 Total 9

European Athletics Championships appearances
- 1934; 1938; 1946; 1950; 1954; 1958; 1962; 1966; 1969; 1971; 1974; 1978; 1982; 1986; 1990; 1994; 1998; 2002; 2006; 2010; 2012; 2014; 2016; 2018; 2022; 2024

Poland competed at the 1971 European Athletics Championships in Helsinki, Finland, from 10–15 August 1971. A delegation of 65 athletes were sent to represent the country.

== Medals ==
Medal	Name	Event
Gold	Daniela Jaworska	Women's javelin throw
Silver	Henryk Szordykowski	Men's 1500 metres
Silver	Gerard Gramse; Tadeusz Cuch; Zenon Nowosz; Marian Dudziak	Men's 4 × 100 metres relay
Silver	Andrzej Badeński; Jan Balachowski; Waldemar Korycki; Jan Werner	Men's 4 × 400 metres relay
Bronze	Irena Szewińska	Women's 200 metres
Bronze	Teresa Sukniewicz	Women's 100 metres hurdles
Bronze	Jan Werner	Men's 400 metres
Bronze	Stanisław Szudrowicz	Men's long jump
Bronze	Władysław Komar	Men's shot put
