= Poland at the 2010 European Athletics Championships =

- WA code: POL
- National federation: Polish Athletic Association
- Website: www.pzla.pl

in Barcelona
- Competitors: 71 (42 men and 29 women)
- Medals Ranked 5th: Gold 3 Silver 1 Bronze 5 Total 9

European Athletics Championships appearances
- 1934; 1938; 1946; 1950; 1954; 1958; 1962; 1966; 1969; 1971; 1974; 1978; 1982; 1986; 1990; 1994; 1998; 2002; 2006; 2010; 2012; 2014; 2016; 2018; 2022; 2024

Poland competed at the 2010 European Athletics Championships in Barcelona, Spain, from 27 July – 1 August 2010. A delegation of 71 athletes were sent to represent the country.

== Medals ==
Medal	Name	Event	Date
Gold	Marcin Lewandowski	Men's 800 metres	31 July
Gold	Tomasz Majewski	Men's shot put	31 July
Gold	Piotr Małachowski	Men's discus throw	1 August
Silver	Grzegorz Sudoł	Men's 50 kilometres walk	30 July
Bronze	Joanna Wiśniewska	Women's discus throw	28 July
Bronze	Anita Włodarczyk	Women's hammer throw	30 July
Bronze	Adam Kszczot	Men's 800 metres	31 July
Bronze	Przemysław Czerwiński	Men's pole vault	31 July
Bronze	Marika Popowicz; Daria Korczyńska; Marta Jeschke; Weronika Wedler	Women's 4 × 100 metres relay	1 August
