= Poland at the 2006 European Athletics Championships =

- WA code: POL
- National federation: Polish Athletic Association
- Website: www.pzla.pl

in Gothenburg
- Competitors: 59
- Medals Ranked 20th: Gold 0 Silver 3 Bronze 4 Total 7

European Athletics Championships appearances
- 1934; 1938; 1946; 1950; 1954; 1958; 1962; 1966; 1969; 1971; 1974; 1978; 1982; 1986; 1990; 1994; 1998; 2002; 2006; 2010; 2012; 2014; 2016; 2018; 2022; 2024

Poland competed at the 2006 European Athletics Championships in Gothenburg, Sweden, from 7–13 August 2006. A delegation of 59 athletes were sent to represent the country.

== Medals ==
Medal	Name	Event
Silver	Marek Plawgo	Men's 400 metres hurdles
Silver	Monika Pyrek	Women's pole vault
Silver	Przemysław Rogowski; Łukasz Chyła; Marcin Jędrusiński; Dariusz Kuć	Men's 4 × 100 metres relay
Bronze	Kamila Skolimowska	Women's hammer throw
Bronze	Wioletta Janowska	Women's 3000 metres steeplechase
Bronze	Monika Bejnar; Grażyna Prokopek; Ewelina Sętowska; Anna Jesień; Marta Chrust-Rożej	Women's 4 × 400 metres relay
Bronze	Daniel Dąbrowski; Piotr Kędzia; Piotr Rysiukiewicz; Rafał Wieruszewski; Marcin Marciniszyn	Men's 4 × 400 metres relay
