= Adrian Lehmann =

Swiss athlete

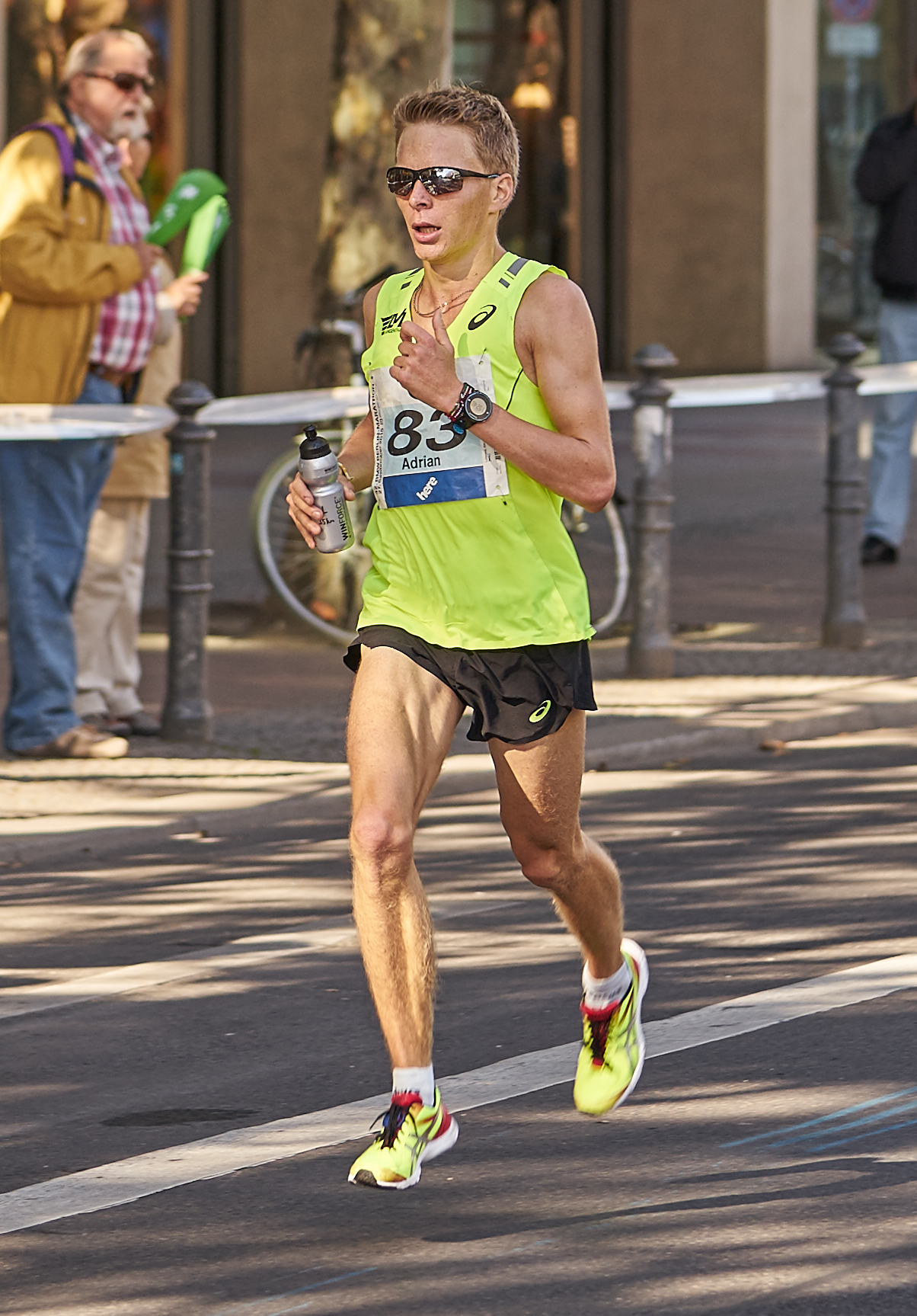
- Lehmann at the Berlin Marathon (2015)

Adrian Lehmann (born 6 December 1989; died 20 April 2024), was a Swiss marathon runner and member of the Langenthal Athletics Association.

== Life ==
His best marathon time was 2:11:44, making him the sixth-best Swiss marathon runner of all time. He was Swiss champion in three disciplines (10 km, half marathon and marathon).

While training for the Zurich Marathon on 21 April 2024, he suffered a heart attack on 18 April, although he was resuscitated immediately, he died two days later at the age of 34 in hospital despite prompt medical attention. He had intended to participate in the qualification for the 2024 Summer Olympics in Zurich.

== Achievements ==
- 10 kilometres
  - Swiss champion, 18 June 2016 in Thun, 29 min 37.86 s (personal best)
- Half marathon
  - Swiss champion, 5 September 2021 in Sarnen, 1 h 5 min 35 s
  - Personal best, 2 April 2023 in Berlin, 1 h 3 min 36 s
- Marathon
  - Swiss champion, 23 April 2023 in Zurich, 2 h 11 min 44 s (personal best)
