= Poland at the 1958 European Athletics Championships =

- WA code: POL
- National federation: Polish Athletic Association

in Stockholm
- Competitors: 49
- Medals Ranked 2nd: Gold 8 Silver 2 Bronze 2 Total 12

European Athletics Championships appearances
- 1934; 1938; 1946; 1950; 1954; 1958; 1962; 1966; 1969; 1971; 1974; 1978; 1982; 1986; 1990; 1994; 1998; 2002; 2006; 2010; 2012; 2014; 2016; 2018; 2022; 2024

Poland competed at the 1958 European Athletics Championships in Stockholm, Sweden, from 19–24 August 1958. A delegation of 49 athletes were sent to represent the country.

== Medals ==
Medal	Name	Event
Gold	Zdzisław Krzyszkowiak	Men's 5000 metres
Gold	Zdzisław Krzyszkowiak	Men's 10,000 metres
Gold	Jerzy Chromik	Men's 3000 metres steeplechase
Gold	Józef Szmidt	Men's triple jump
Gold	Edmund Piątkowski	Men's discus throw
Gold	Tadeusz Rut	Men's hammer throw
Gold	Janusz Sidło	Men's javelin throw
Gold	Barbara Janiszewska	Women's 200 metres
Silver	Kazimierz Zimny	Men's 5000 metres
Silver	Kazimierz Kropidłowski	Men's long jump
Bronze	Henryk Grabowski	Men's long jump
Bronze	Maria Chojnacka; Barbara Janiszewska; Celina Jesionowska; Maria Bibro	Women's 4 × 100 metres relay
