= Poland at the 1962 European Athletics Championships =

- WA code: POL
- National federation: Polish Athletic Association

in Belgrade
- Competitors: 50
- Medals: Gold 3 Silver 5 Bronze 5 Total 13

European Athletics Championships appearances
- 1934; 1938; 1946; 1950; 1954; 1958; 1962; 1966; 1969; 1971; 1974; 1978; 1982; 1986; 1990; 1994; 1998; 2002; 2006; 2010; 2012; 2014; 2016; 2018; 2022; 2024

Poland competed at the 1962 European Athletics Championships in Belgrade, Yugoslavia, from 12–16 September 1962. A delegation of 50 athletes were sent to represent the country.

== Medals ==
Medal	Name	Event
Gold	Józef Szmidt	Men's triple jump
Gold	Teresa Ciepły	Women's 80 metres hurdles
Gold	Teresa Ciepły; Maria Piątkowska; Barbara Sobotta; Elżbieta Szyroka	Women's 4 × 100 metres relay
Silver	Marian Foik	Men's 200 metres
Silver	Witold Baran	Men's 1500 metres
Silver	Kazimierz Zimny	Men's 5000 metres
Silver	Elżbieta Krzesińska	Women's long jump
Silver	Jerzy Juskowiak; Andrzej Zieliński; Zbigniew Syka; Marian Foik	Men's 4 × 100 metres relay
Bronze	Alfred Sosgórnik	Men's shot put
Bronze	Władysław Nikiciuk	Men's javelin throw
Bronze	Teresa Ciepły	Women's 100 metres
Bronze	Barbara Sobotta	Women's 200 metres
Bronze	Maria Piątkowska	Women's 80 metres hurdles
