= Poland at the 1974 European Athletics Championships =

- WA code: POL
- National federation: Polish Athletic Association

in Rome
- Competitors: 56
- Medals Ranked 4th: Gold 4 Silver 2 Bronze 4 Total 10

European Athletics Championships appearances
- 1934; 1938; 1946; 1950; 1954; 1958; 1962; 1966; 1969; 1971; 1974; 1978; 1982; 1986; 1990; 1994; 1998; 2002; 2006; 2010; 2012; 2014; 2016; 2018; 2022; 2024

Poland competed at the 1974 European Athletics Championships in Rome, Italy, from 1–8 September 1974. A delegation of 56 athletes were sent to represent the country.

== Medals ==
Medal	Name	Event
Gold	Bronisław Malinowski	Men's 3000 metres steeplechase
Gold	Ryszard Skowronek	Men's decathlon
Gold	Irena Szewińska	Women's 100 metres
Gold	Irena Szewińska	Women's 200 metres
Silver	Władysław Kozakiewicz	Men's pole vault
Silver	Mirosław Wodzyński	Men's 110 metres hurdles
Bronze	Leszek Wodzyński	Men's 110 metres hurdles
Bronze	Andrzej Sontag	Men's triple jump
Bronze	Teresa Nowak	Women's 100 metres hurdles
Bronze	Ewa Długołęcka; Danuta Jędrejek; Barbara Bakulin; Irena Szewińska	Women's 4 × 100 metres relay
