= Arkadiusz Gardzielewski =

Polish long-distance runner

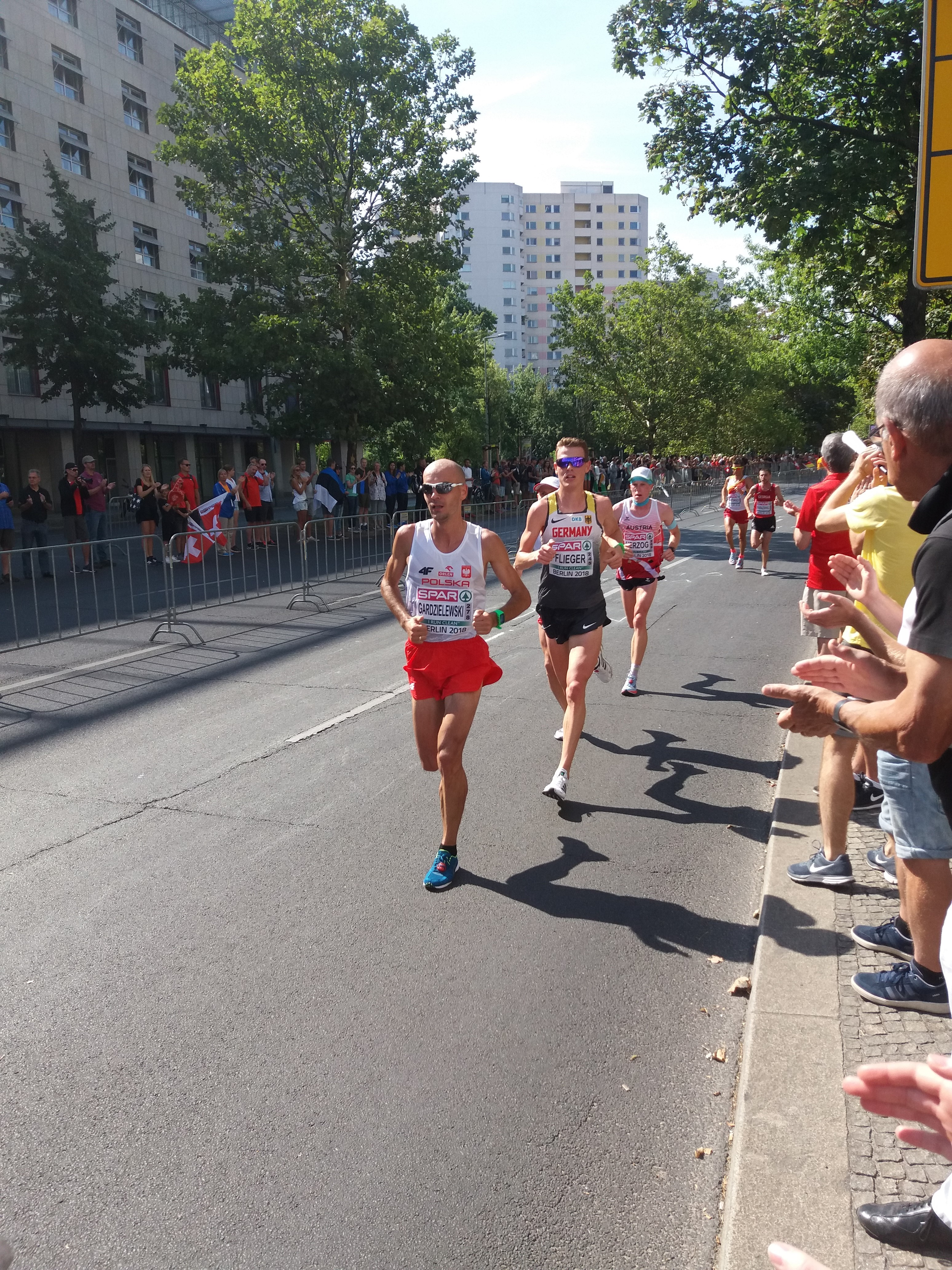
- Gardzielewski at the 2018 European Championships

Personal information
- Nationality: Polish
- Born: 12 June 1986 (age 39) Tczew, Poland

Sport
- Sport: Athletics
- Event: Long-distance running

Arkadiusz Gardzielewski (born 12 June 1986) is a Polish long-distance runner. He qualified to represent Poland at the 2020 Summer Olympics in Tokyo 2021, competing in men's marathon.
