= Katarzyna Jankowska =

Polish long-distance runner

Personal information
- Born: 14 January 1994 (age 31)

Sport
- Country: Poland
- Sport: Long-distance running

Katarzyna Jankowska (née Katarzyna Rutkowska, born 14 January 1994) is a Polish long-distance runner. In 2020, she competed in the women's half marathon at the 2020 World Athletics Half Marathon Championships held in Gdynia, Poland.

In 2019, she competed in the women's 5000 metres at the 2019 Summer Universiade held in Naples, Italy. She finished in 5th place in the final.
