= Patryk Wykrota =

Polish sprinter

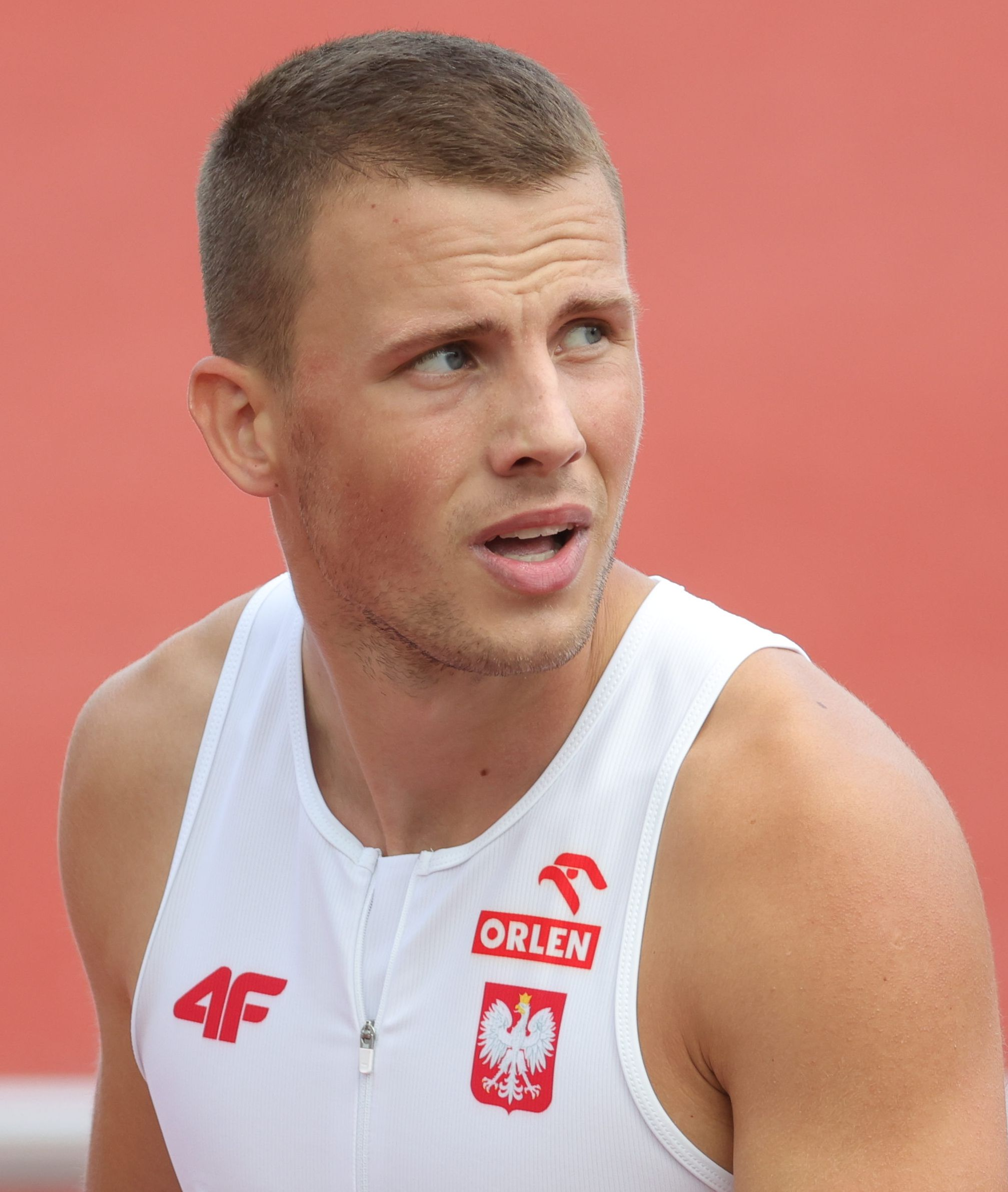
- Wykrota in 2022

Personal information
- Nationality: Polish
- Born: 13 November 2000 (age 25)

Sport
- Sport: Athletics
- Event(s): 100 metres, 200 metres
- Club: KS Stal LA Ostrów Wielkopolski

Achievements and titles
- Personal bests: Outdoor; 100 m: 10.34 (Suwalki 2022); 200 m: 20.67 (Sotteville-lès-Rouen 2022); Indoor; 60 m: 6.76 (Toruń 2023); 200 m: 20.94 (Toruń 2023); 300 m: 33.85 (Toruń 2020); 400 m: 49.13 (Toruń 2021)
Medal record
Men's athletics
Representing Poland
European Championships
Bronze medal – third place	2022 Munich	4×100 m relay

Patryk Wykrota (born 13 November 2000) is a Polish sprinter. He won a bronze medal in the 4×100 m relay at the 2022 European Athletics Championships, setting a Polish national record of 38.15 seconds in the process.
