= Yared Shegumo =

Polish long-distance runner

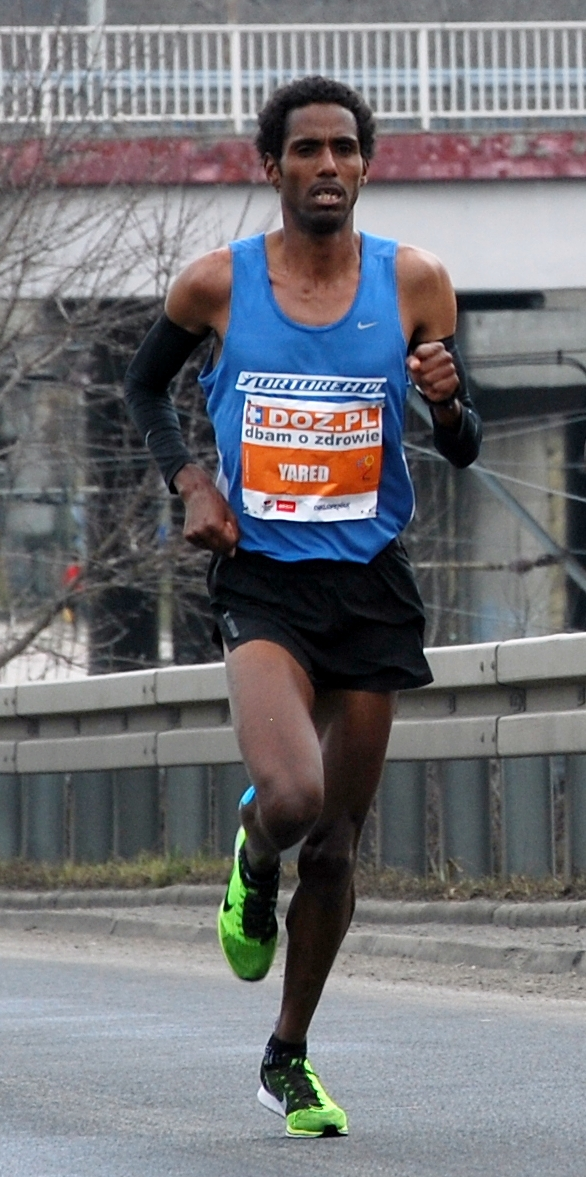
- Yared Shegumo in 2013.

Personal information
- Nationality: Polish
- Born: 10 January 1983 (age 43) Addis Abeba, Ethiopia

Sport
- Sport: Athletics
- Event: Marathon
- Club: AZS-AWF Warszawa
Medal record
Representing Poland
Men's athletics
European Championships
Silver medal – second place	2014 Zürich	Marathon

Yared Neda Shegumo (born January 10, 1983, in Addis Ababa, Ethiopia) is a Polish distance runner, who specializes in the Marathon. His biggest success to date is the silver medal at the 2014 European Championships in Zürich.

== Biography ==
Yared first came to Poland in 1999 to represent his native Ethiopia at the 1999 World Youth Championships which were held in Bydgoszcz. He competed in the 400 metres, going out in the semifinals. Since Ethiopia was at the time in the middle of the war with Eritrea, he decided to defect for fear of being conscripted. The first year and a half in the new country, he spent in a center for immigrants. In his trainings, he moved up from the sprints to the middle-distances. In 2004 he beat a long-standing Polish record in the indoor 3000 metres. In the same distance he came third at the 2005 European Cup. Soon, however, his results stagnated and he lost the support from the Polish Athletics Federation. Due to a difficult financial situation, he decided to migrate to England where he worked in a warehouse near Birmingham. At the time he stopped training almost completely.

In 2011, he came back to Poland and resumed his trainings, this time concentrating on road running. He won the 10 kilometres at the largest Polish mass running event "Run Warsaw" the same year. In 2013, he came first at the Warsaw Marathon, which was his debut at this distance. He won a silver medal at the 2014 European Athletics Championships in the Marathon. In 2018, he competed in the men's marathon at the 2018 European Athletics Championships held in Berlin, Germany. He did not finish his race.

== Personal life ==
In 2005 he married his Ethiopian girlfriend, Birtukan. They have one daughter and one son.

== Personal bests ==
Outdoor

- 800 metres – 1:47.83 (Poznań 2005)
- 1000 metres – 2:20.72 (Siedlce 2005)
- 1500 metres – 3:40.12 (Poznań 2003)
- 3000 metres – 8:04.24 (Zielona Góra 2005)
- 5000 metres – 13:58.34 (Gdansk 2004)
- 10000 metres - 30:18.77 (Postomino 2014)
- Half Marathon – 1:03:42 (Warsaw 2013)
- Marathon – 2:10:34 (Warsaw 2013)

Indoor

- 800 metres – 1:48.81 (Spała 2005)
- 1500 metres – 3:42.76 (Spała 2005)
- 2000 metres – 5:14.36 (Warsaw 2004)
- 3000 metres – 7:54.04 (Leipzig 2004) – former national record
