= Izabela Paszkiewicz =

Polish long-distance runner

Personal information
- Nationality: Polish
- Born: Izabela Trzaskalska; 9 January 1988 (age 38)

Sport
- Sport: Long-distance running
- Event: Marathon

Izabela Paszkiewicz (née Trzaskalska; born 9 January 1988) is a Polish long-distance runner. She competed in the women's marathon at the 2017 World Championships in Athletics.
