= Ewa Różańska =

Polish hammer thrower

Personal information
- Nationality: Polish
- Born: 22 December 2000 (age 24)

Sport
- Sport: Track and field
- Event: Hammer throw
- Club: KS AZS AWF Warszawa
Medal record
Women's athletics
Representing Poland
European Championships
Silver medal – second place	2022 Munich	Hammer throw

Ewa Różańska is a Polish hammer thrower. She is a 2022 European Championships Silver medallist in Munich.
