= Mateusz Rzeźniczak =

Polish sprinter

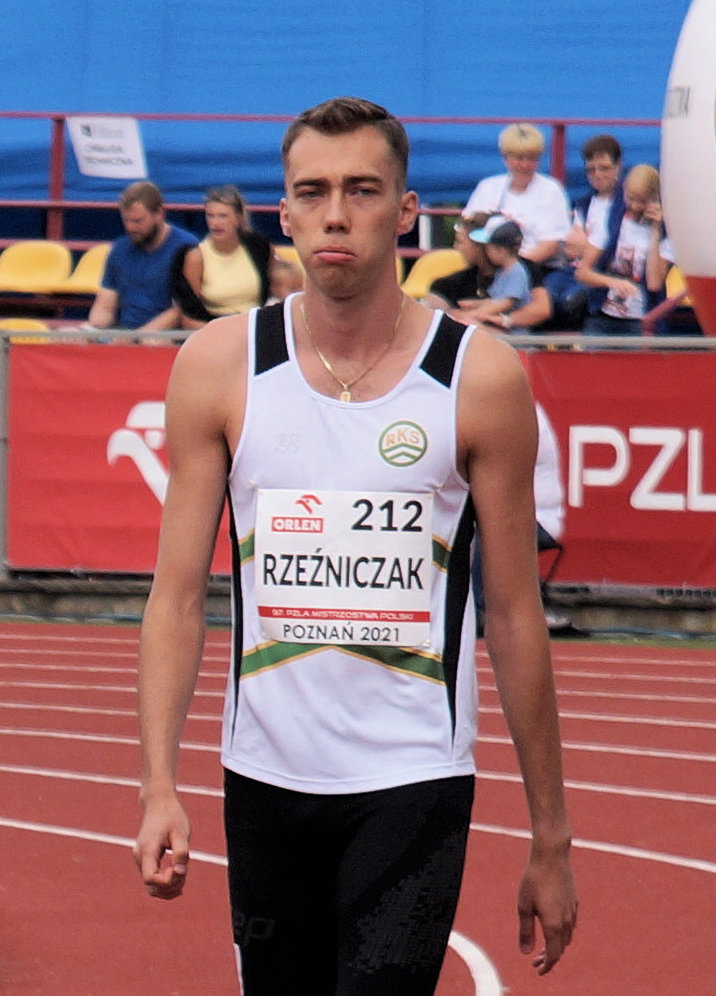
- Rzeźniczak in 2021

Personal information
- Nationality: Polish
- Born: 23 August 1998 (age 27)

Sport
- Sport: Athletics
- Event: 400 metres
- Club: RKS Łódź
- Coached by: Dominik Kopeć
Medal record
Summer World University Games
Silver medal – second place	2021 Chengdu	4 × 400 m relay
Polish Athletics Championships
Gold medal – first place	2020 Włocławek	4 × 400 m relay
Silver medal – second place	2020 Włocławek	400 m
Silver medal – second place	2021 Poznań	400 m
Bronze medal – third place	2022 Suwałki	400 m
Polish Indoor Athletics Championships
Bronze medal – third place	2022 Toruń	400 m

Mateusz Rzeźniczak (born 23 August 1998) is a Polish sprinter who specializes in the 400 metres. He represented Poland at the 2020 Summer Olympics in the men's 4 × 400 metres relay, where the Polish team finished fifth.

== Career ==
Rzeźniczak has competed nationally and internationally in the 400 metres and relay events. He won a silver medal in the 4 × 400 metres relay at the 2021 Summer World University Games.
