= Polish Athletics Association =

Sports governing body in Poland

Polski Związek Lekkiej Atletyki
- Sport: Athletics
- Jurisdiction: Association
- Abbreviation: PZLA
- Founded: 11 October 1919
- Affiliation: World Athletics
- Affiliation date: 1921
- Regional affiliation: EAA
- Headquarters: Warsaw
- President: Sebastian Chmara
- Secretary: Piotr Długosielski

Official website
- www.pzla.pl
- (Poland)

The Polish Athletics Association (Polish: Polski Związek Lekkiej Atletyki – PZLA) is the governing body for the sport of athletics in Poland. The current president is Sebastian Chmara.

== History ==
PZLA was founded in 1919 and was affiliated to the IAAF in 1921.

Former presidents:

- 1919–1921: Tadeusz Kuchar
- 1921–1926: Bronisław Kowalewski
- 1926–1930: Jerzy Misiński
- 1930–1939: Wacław Znajdowski
- 1945–1949: Walenty Foryś
- 1949–1965: Czesław Foryś
- 1965–1967: Michał Godlewski
- 1967: Henryk Krzemiński
- 1967–1969: Witold Gerutto
- 1969–1972: Andrzej Majkowski
- 1972–1973: Adam Zborowski
- 1973–1976: Piotr Nurowski
- 1976–1978: Stefan Milewski
- 1978–1980: Piotr Nurowski
- 1980–1984: Czesław Ząbecki
- 1984–1986: Leszek Wysłocki
- 1986–1988: Mieczysław Kolejwa (caretaker)
- 1988–1989: Jan Mulak (curator PZLA)
- 1989–1997: Czesław Ząbecki
- 1997–2009: Irena Szewińska
- 2009–2016: Jerzy Skucha
- 2016–2024: Henryk Olszewski
- 2024–: Sebastian Chmara

== Affiliations ==
PZLA is the national member federation for Poland in the following international organisations:

- World Athletics
- European Athletics (EA)

== National records ==
PZLA maintains the Polish records in athletics.

== Kit suppliers ==
Poland's kits are currently supplied by Polish sportswear company 4F.
